= Fahadh Faasil filmography =

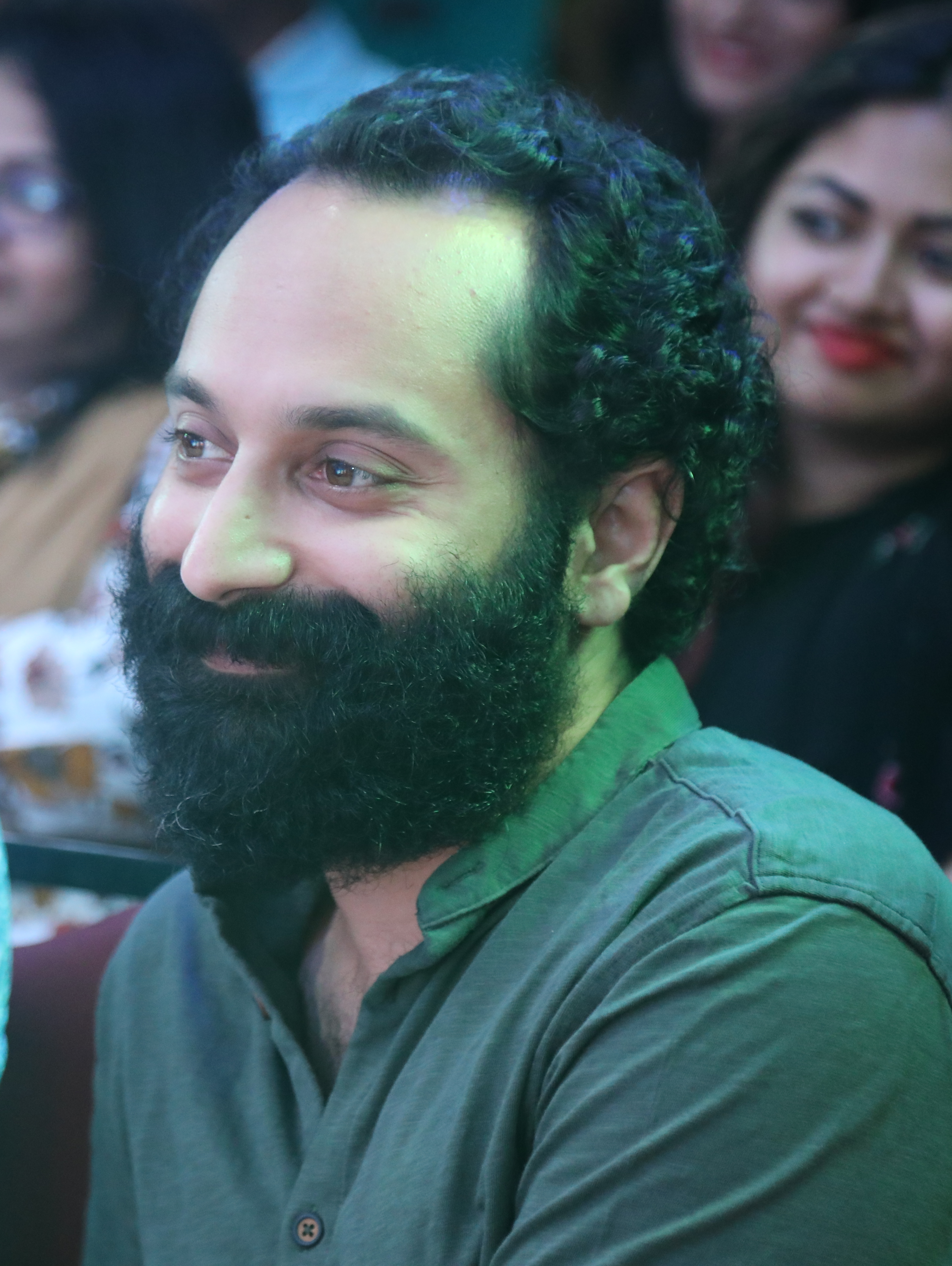
- Fahadh Faasil in 2018
- Film: 64
- Television series: 1
- Music videos: 2
- Others: 1

Abdul Hameed Mohammed Fahad Fazil, professionally known as Fahadh Faasil or FaFa, is an Indian actor and producer who predominantly works in Malayalam films, in addition to a few Tamil and Telugu films. Fahadh is a recipient of several accolades including a National Film Award, four Kerala State Film Awards and three Filmfare Awards South.

Fahadh began his film career at the age of 20 by starring in the leading role in his father Fazil's 2002 romantic film Kaiyethum Doorath, which was a critical and commercial failure. After a gap of 7 years, Fahadh made his comeback with the anthology film Kerala Cafe (2009), in the short film Mrityunjayam. He attained public attention for his role as Arjun in the thriller film Chaappa Kurishu (2011). Fahadh won his first Kerala State Film Award, the Best Supporting Actor Award for his performance in Chaappa Kurishu along with his performance in Akam. He achieved critical acclaim and recognition for his roles as Cyril in 22 Female Kottayam (2012) and Dr. Arun Kumar in Diamond Necklace (2012). He won his first Filmfare Award for Best Actor, for his role in 22 Female Kottayam.

Fahadh followed it up by starring as Shivadas in the coming-of-age drama film Bangalore Days (2014), which ranks among the highest-grossing Malayalam films. He produced and starred as Aloshy in the 2014 period film Iyobinte Pusthakam under his production company, Fahadh Faasil and Friends Pvt Ltd. Fahadh had roles as Mahesh Bhavana in Maheshinte Prathikaaram (2016), Indian diplomat Manoj Abraham in Take Off (2017), and Prasad in Thondimuthalum Driksakshiyum (2017), with Maheshinte Prathikaaram and Thondimuthalum Driksakshiyum winning the Best Feature Film in Malayalam Award at the 64th and 65th National Film Awards. He won the National Film Award for Best Supporting Actor for his performance in Thondimuthalum Driksakshiyum (2017) and his third Filmfare Award for Best Actor – Malayalam. In 2018, he acted as Prakashan in the film Njan Prakashan which ranks among highest-grossing Malayalam films and as Aby in the film Varathan. In 2021, Fahadh portrayed the titular anti-hero in the Joji which received critical acclaim. Fahadh later starred in the Malik (2021), which earned him nationwide recognition. Following this, Fahadh gained further fame for his role as Bhanwar Singh Shekhawat in Pushpa: The Rise (2021), a major commercial success that grossed over ₹350 crore worldwide. He reprised his role in the sequel Pushpa 2: The Rule (2024), which grossed between ₹1,642 crore and ₹1,800 crore worldwide, becoming one of the highest-grossing Indian films. Fahadh also starred in the Vikram (2022) and the Aavesham (2024), further cementing his diverse career.

== Malayalam films ==
Key
| † | Denotes films that have not yet been released |

| Year | Title | Role(s) | Notes | Ref. |
|---|---|---|---|---|
| 2002 | Kaiyethum Doorath | Sachin Madhavan | Credited as Shaanu | |
| 2009 | Kerala Cafe | The journalist / Spirit | Segment: "Mrityunjayam" | |
| 2010 | Pramani | Bobby Joseph Varghese | | |
| 2010 | Cocktail | Naveen Krishnamoorthy | | |
| 2010 | Tournament | Viswanathan | | |
| 2010 | Best of Luck | Himself | Cameo appearance | |
| 2011 | Chaappa Kurishu | Arjun Samuel | Won–Kerala State Film Award for Best Supporting Actor | |
| 2011 | Indian Rupee | Muneer | Cameo appearance | |
| 2012 | Padmasree Bharat Dr. Saroj Kumar | Alex Samuel | | |
| 2012 | 22 Female Kottayam | Cyril C. Mathew | | |
| 2012 | Diamond Necklace | Dr. Arun Kumar | | |
| 2012 | Friday | Balu | | |
| 2013 | Annayum Rasoolum | Rasool | | |
| 2013 | Natholi Oru Cheriya Meenalla | Preman / Narendran (Note: Fahadh played dual roles in the film.) | | |
| 2013 | Red Wine | Sakhavu C.V. Anoop | | |
| 2013 | Amen | Solomon | | |
| 2013 | Immanuel | Jeevan Raj | | |
| 2013 | Akam | Srini | | |
| 2013 | 5 Sundarikal | Ajmal | Segment: "Aami" | |
| 2013 | Olipporu | Ajayan | | |
| 2013 | Artist | Michael Angelo | Won–Kerala State Film Award for Best Actor | |
| 2013 | North 24 Kaatham | Harikrishnan | Won–Kerala State Film Award for Best Actor | |
| 2013 | D Company | Dr. Sunil Mathew | Segment: "Day of Judgement" | |
| 2013 | Oru Indian Pranayakadha | Aymanam Siddharthan | | |
| 2014 | 1 by Two | Yusuf Marikkar | | |
| 2014 | God's Own Country | Manu Krishna | | |
| 2014 | Bangalore Days | Shivadas "Das" | | |
| 2014 | Iyobinte Pusthakam | Aloshy Gomber | | |
| 2014 | Money Ratnam | Neil John Samuel | | |
| 2015 | Mariyam Mukku | Felix | | |
| 2015 | Haram | Balakrishnan "Balu" | | |
| 2015 | Ayal Njanalla | Prakashan / Himself | | |
| 2016 | Monsoon Mangoes | D. P. Pallikkal | | |
| 2016 | Maheshinte Prathikaaram | Mahesh Bhavana | | |
| 2017 | Take Off | Manoj Abraham IFS | | |
| 2017 | Role Models | Gautham S. Menon | | |
| 2017 | Thondimuthalum Driksakshiyum | Prasad | Won–National Film Award for Best Supporting Actor | |
| 2018 | Carbon | Sibi Sebastian | | |
| 2018 | Varathan | Abin "Aby" Mathew | | |
| 2018 | Njan Prakashan | Prakashan / P.R. Akash / Sylvester (Note: Fahadh played a single character with two or more names.) | | |
| 2019 | Kumbalangi Nights | Shammi Sreenivasan | Won–Kerala State Film Award for Best Character Actor | |
| 2019 | Athiran | Vinayan / Dr. M. K. Nair | | |
| 2020 | Trance | Viju Prasad / Pastor Joshua Carlton | | |
| 2020 | C U Soon | Kevin Thomas | | |
| 2021 | Irul | Unni | | |
| 2021 | Joji | Joji Panachel | | |
| 2021 | Malik | Ahammadali Sulaiman / Alikka | | |
| 2022 | Malayankunju | Anil Kumar / Anikuttan | | |
| 2023 | Pachuvum Athbutha Vilakkum | Prasanth "Pachu" Rajan | | |
| 2023 | Dhoomam | Avinash "Avi" | | |
| 2024 | Aavesham | Ranjith "Ranga" Gangadharan | | |
| 2024 | Bougainvillea | ACP David Koshy IPS | | |
| 2025 | Odum Kuthira Chaadum Kuthira | Aby Mathew | | |
| 2026 | Patriot | Shakthi Sundaram | | |
| 2027 | Karate Chandran † | TBA | Filming | |

== Other language films ==
Key
| † | Denotes films that have not yet been released |

| Year | Film | Role | Language | Notes | ref |
|---|---|---|---|---|---|
| 2017 | Velaikkaran | Adhiban "Aadhi" Madhav | Tamil | | |
| 2019 | Super Deluxe | Mugil | Tamil | | |
| 2021 | Pushpa: The Rise | SP Bhanwar Singh Shekhawat IPS | Telugu | | |
| 2022 | Vikram | Agent Amar | Tamil | | |
| 2023 | Maamannan | Rathnavelu | Tamil | | |
| 2024 | Vettaiyan | Cyber Patrick "Battery" | Tamil | | |
| 2024 | Pushpa 2: The Rule | SP Bhanwar Singh Shekhawat IPS | Telugu | | |
| 2025 | Maareesan | Dhayalan | Tamil | | |
| 2026 | Idhayam Murali | Surya | Tamil | Special appearance | |
| 2026 | Don't Trouble The Trouble | Suri | Telugu | | |

== Producer ==
Key
| † | Denotes films that have not yet been released |

| Year | Title | Notes | Ref. |
|---|---|---|---|
| 2014 | Iyobinte Pusthakam | Co-produced with Amal Neerad Productions | |
| 2018 | Varathan | Co-produced with Amal Neerad Productions | |
| 2019 | Kumbalangi Nights | Co-produced with Working Class Hero | |
| 2020 | C U Soon | | |
| 2021 | Joji | Produced by Bhavana Studios in association with Fahadh Faasil and Friends and Working Class Hero | |
| 2022 | Malayankunju | Co-produced with Fazil under Fahadh Faasil and Friends | |
| 2022 | Palthu Janwar | Produced by Bhavana Studios in association with Fahadh Faasil and Friends and Working Class Hero | |
| 2023 | Thankam | Produced by Bhavana Studios in association with Fahadh Faasil and Friends and Working Class Hero | |
| 2024 | Premalu | Produced by Bhavana Studios in association with Fahadh Faasil and Friends and Working Class Hero | |
| 2024 | Aavesham | Produced by Fahadh Faasil and Friends and Anwar Rasheed Entertainments | |
| 2025 | Painkili | Produced by Fahadh Faasil and Friends and Urban Animal | |
| 2026 | Bethlehem Kudumba Unit | Produced by Fahadh Faasil and Friends and Bhavana Studios | |
| 2026 | Bachelor Party D'eux | Co-produced with Amal Neerad Productions, Anwar Rasheed Entertainments | |

== Music videos ==
| Year | Title | Ref. |
|---|---|---|
| 2017 | Enthaavo | |
| 2018 | Viswasam | |

== Television ==
| Year | Title | Role(s) | Language | Notes | Ref. |
|---|---|---|---|---|---|
| 2024 | Manorathangal | Balu | Malayalam | Segment: "Sherlock" | |

== Discography ==
| Year | Song | Film | Composer | Ref. |
|---|---|---|---|---|
| 2016 | "Anganeyaanu" | Olipporu | John P. Varkey | |
