= List of awards and nominations received by Fahadh Faasil =

Fahadh Faasil awards and nominations
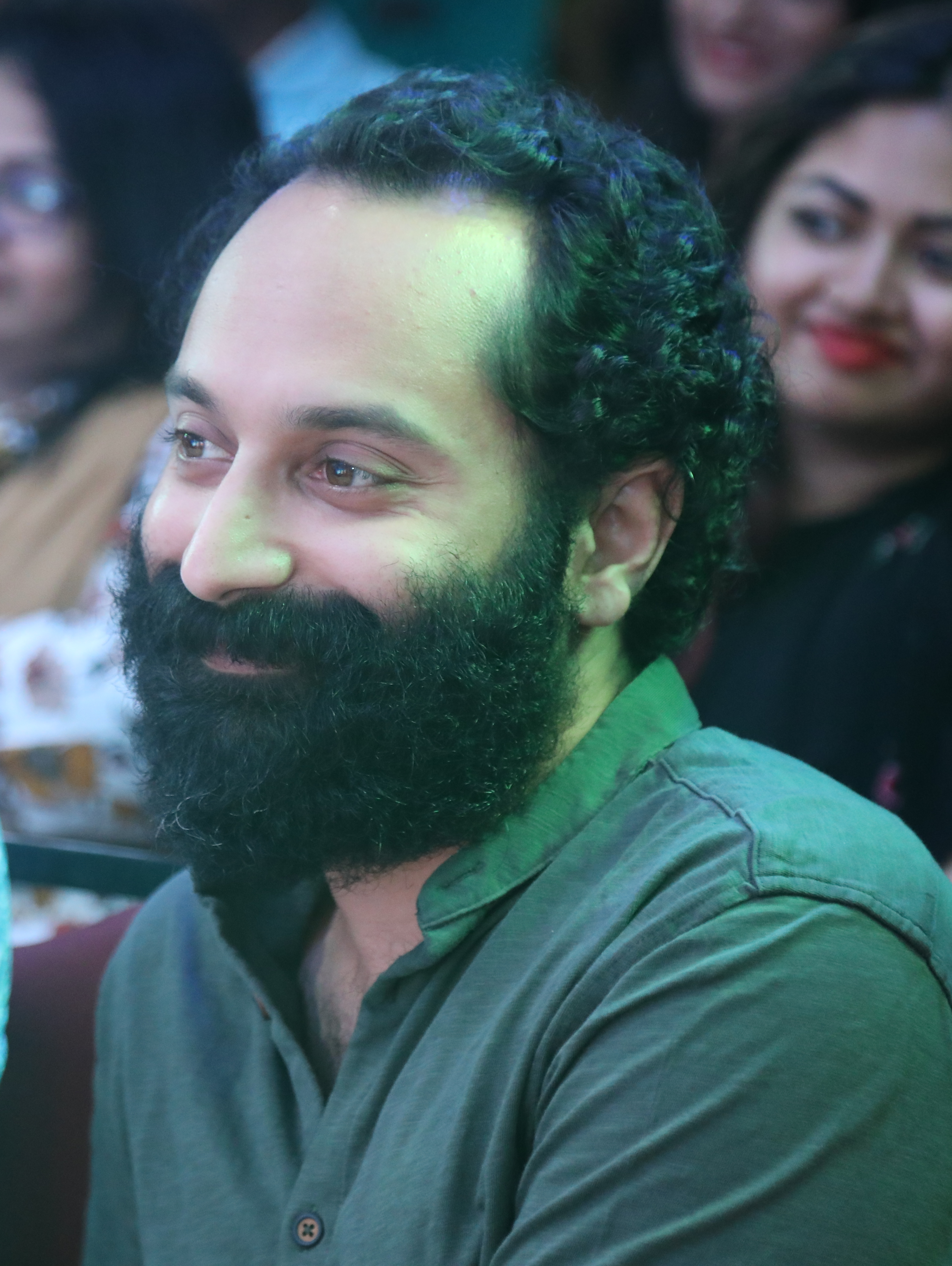
- Fahadh in 2018
Awards and nominations
Award	Wins	Nominations
Asianet Film Awards	4	6
Asiavision Awards	1	1
Filmfare Awards South	4	8
IIFA Utsavam	0	5
Kerala Film Critics Association Awards	1	1
Kerala State Film Awards	5	5
National Film Awards	1	1
South Indian International Movie Awards	2	18
Vanitha Film Awards	3	3

Totals (Note: Certain award groups do not simply award one winner. They acknowledge several different recipients, have runners-up, and have third place. Since this is a specific recognition and is different from losing an award, runner-up mentions are considered wins in this award tally. For simplification and to avoid errors, each award in this list has been presumed to have had a prior nomination.)
- Wins: 30
- Nominations: 65

Fahadh Faasil is an Indian actor and producer who primarily works in Malayalam films. Noted for his diverse portrayals, Fahadh is a recipient of several accolades including a National Film Award, four Kerala State Film Awards, four Filmfare Awards South, one Kerala Film Critics Association Awards and two SIIMA Awards.

Fahadh has won three Filmfare Award for Best Actor – Malayalam for his performance in 22 Female Kottayam (2012), North 24 Kaatham (2013) and Thondimuthalum Driksakshiyum (2017). Thondimuthalum Driksakshiyum also won him the National Film Award for Best Supporting Actor. Additionally, he has also earned four Kerala State Film Awards — Second Best Actor for Chaappa Kurishu and Akam (both 2011), Best Actor for Artist and North 24 Kaatham (both 2013), Best Character Actor and Kumbalangi Nights (2020). and Best Film with Popular Appeal and Aesthetic Value for Premalu in 2024 ?

== Amrita Film Awards ==
Fahadh has won one Amrita Film Awards.

Year	Category	Film	Result	Ref.
2013	Best Onscreen Pair (with Ann Augustine)	Artist	Won	

== Ananda Vikatan Cinema Awards ==
The Ananda Vikatan Cinema Awards are annual awards in recognition for cinematic merit in the Tamil film industry. Fahadh has received one nomination.

Year	Category	Film	Result	Ref.
2022	Best Character Actor	Vikram	Nominated	

== Asianet Film Awards ==
The Asianet Film Awards is an award ceremony for films presented annually by Asianet, a Malayalam-language television network from the south-Indian state of Kerala. Fahadh has won four awards from six nominations.

Year	Category	Film	Result	Ref.
2013	Youth Icon of the Year	—N/a	Won	
2015	Best Film	Iyobinte Pusthakam	Won	
2015	Performer of the Year	—N/a	Won	
2018	Best Actor	Thondimuthalum Driksakshiyum	Won	
2019	Best Actor	Varathan & Njan Prakashan	Nominated	
2019	Most Popular Actor	Varathan & Njan Prakashan	Nominated	

== Asiavision Awards ==
Asiavision Awards have been held annually since 2006 to honor the artistes and technicians of Indian cinema and television & is organized under the leadership of renowned journalist Nissar Syed. Fahadh has won one award.

Year	Category	Film	Result	Ref.
2012	Performer of the Year	22 Female Kottayam & Diamond Necklace	Won	

== CPC Cine Awards ==
CPC Cine Awards is an annual awards ceremony for films in the Malayalam film industry, which was crowd-sourced and hosted by a Facebook group named Cinema Paradiso Club. Fahadh has won two awards.

Year	Category	Film	Result	Ref.
2017	Best Actor	Thondimuthalum Driksakshiyum	Won	
2019	Best Film	Kumbalangi Nights	Won	

== Critics' Choice Film Awards ==
Fahadh has won one Critics' Choice Film Awards from three nominations.

Year	Category	Film	Result	Ref.
2020	Best Film	Kumbalangi Nights	Won	
2021	Best Actor – Male	Trance	Nominated	
2023	Best Supporting Actor – Male	Vikram	Nominated	

== Filmfare Awards South ==
The Filmfare Awards South are annual awards that honour artistic and technical excellence in the Telugu cinema, Tamil cinema, Malayalam cinema and Kannada cinema. They are presented by Filmfare magazine of The Times Group. Fahadh has won four awards from eight nominations.

Year	Category	Film	Result	Ref.
2012	Best Supporting Actor – Malayalam	Chaappa Kurishu	Nominated	
2013	Best Actor – Malayalam	22 Female Kottayam	Won	
2014	Best Actor – Malayalam	North 24 Kaatham	Won	
2015	Best Supporting Actor – Malayalam	Bangalore Days	Nominated	
2017	Best Actor – Malayalam	Maheshinte Prathikaaram	Nominated	
2018	Best Actor – Malayalam	Thondimuthalum Driksakshiyum	Won	
2022	Best Actor – Malayalam	Malik	Nominated	
2024	Best Supporting Actor – Tamil	Maamannan	Won	

== Film Critics Circle of India ==
Film Critics Circle of India (FCCI) is a society comprising notable film critics from all the major film producing states of India. Fahadh has received one nomination.

Year	Category	Film	Result	Ref.
2019	Best Film	Kumbalangi Nights	Nominated	

== IIFA Utsavam ==
The IIFA Utsavam rewards the artistic and technical achievements of the South Indian film industry. The ceremony is organised by Wizcraft International, and represents Tamil cinema, Telugu cinema, Malayalam cinema and Kannada cinema. Fahadh has received five nominations.

Year	Category	Film	Result	Ref.
2016	Best Film – Malayalam	Iyobinte Pusthakam	Nominated	
2016	Best Actor – Malayalam	Iyobinte Pusthakam	Nominated	
2017	Best Actor – Malayalam	Maheshinte Prathikaaram	Nominated	
2024	Best Actor – Malayalam	Pachuvum Athbutha Vilakkum	Nominated	
2024	Best Actor in a Negative Role – Tamil	Maamannan	Nominated	

== Indian Film Festival of Melbourne ==
The Indian Film Festival of Melbourne (IFFM) is an annual festival based in Melbourne, founded in 2010. Fahadh has received three nominations.

Year	Category	Film	Result	Ref.
2018	Best Actor	Thondimuthalum Driksakshiyum & Varathan	Nominated	
2024	Best Actor	Aavesham	Nominated	
2024	Best Film	Premalu	Nominated	

== International Film Festival of Kerala ==
The International Film Festival of Kerala (abbreviated as IFFK) is a film festival held annually in Thiruvananthapuram, India. Started in 1996, it is hosted by the Kerala State Chalachitra Academy. Fahadh has won two awards.

Year	Category	Film	Result	Ref.
2018	Best Actor	Thondimuthalum Driksakshiyum	Won	
2019	Best Malayalam Film (Special Mention)	Kumbalangi Nights	Won	

== Kerala Film Critics Association Awards ==
The Kerala Film Critics Association Awards are presented annually by the Kerala Film Critics Association to honour both artistic and technical excellence of professionals in the Malayalam language film industry of India. Fahadh has won one award.

Year	Category	Film	Result	Ref.
2019	Best Actor	Thondimuthalum Driksakshiyum	Won	

== Kerala State Film Awards ==
The Kerala State Film Awards are the film awards for a motion picture made in Kerala. The awards started in 1969 by the Department of Cultural Affairs, Government of Kerala and since 1998 the awards have been bestowed by Kerala State Chalachitra Academy on behalf of the Department of Cultural Affairs. Fahadh has won four awards.

Year	Category	Film	Result	Ref.
2012	Second Best Actor	Chaappa Kurishu & Akam	Won	
2014	Best Actor	Artist & North 24 Kaatham	Won	
2020	Best Character Actor	Kumbalangi Nights	Won	
2020	Best Film with Popular Appeal and Aesthetic Value	Kumbalangi Nights	Won	
2024	Best Film with Popular Appeal and Aesthetic Value	Premalu	Won	

== Mazhavil Entertainment Awards ==
The Mazhavil Entertainment Awards is an award ceremony for films presented by Mazhavil Manorama, a Malayalam-language television network from the state of Kerala.

Year	Category	Film	Result	Ref.
2024	Entertainer of the Year – Film	Aavesham	Won	

== National Film Awards ==
The National Film Awards are awards for artistic and technical merit given for "Excellence within the Indian film industry". Established in 1954, it has been administered, by the Indian government's Directorate of Film Festivals from 1973 until 2020, and by the NFDC since 2021. Fahadh has won one award.

Year	Category	Film	Result	Ref.
2017	Best Supporting Actor	Thondimuthalum Driksakshiyum	Won	

== South Indian International Movie Awards ==
South Indian International Movie Awards, also known as the SIIMA Awards, rewards the artistic and technical achievements of the South Indian film industry. It was launched in 2012 to appreciate and honour film makers from across the South Indian film industries: Telugu cinema, Tamil cinema, Kannada cinema, and Malayalam cinema. Fahadh has won two awards from eighteen nominations.

Year	Category	Film	Result	Ref.
2013	Best Actor – Malayalam	Diamond Necklace	Nominated	
2013	Best Actor Critics – Malayalam	Diamond Necklace	Won	
2014	Best Actor – Malayalam	North 24 Kaatham	Nominated	
2015	Best Actor – Malayalam	Iyobinte Pusthakam	Nominated	
2017	Best Actor – Malayalam	Maheshinte Prathikaaram	Nominated	
2018	Best Actor – Malayalam	Thondimuthalum Driksakshiyum	Nominated	
2018	Best Actor Critics – Malayalam	Thondimuthalum Driksakshiyum	Won	
2018	Best Actor in a Negative Role – Tamil	Velaikkaran	Nominated	
2019	Best Film – Malayalam	Varathan	Nominated	
2020	Best Actor in a Negative Role – Malayalam	Kumbalangi Nights	Nominated	
2020	Best Film – Malayalam	Kumbalangi Nights	Nominated	
2021	Best Film – Malayalam	C U Soon	Nominated	
2021	Best Actor – Malayalam	Trance & C U Soon	Nominated	
2022	Best Actor – Malayalam	Malik	Nominated	
2022	Best Film – Malayalam	Joji	Nominated	
2024	Best Actor in a Negative Role – Tamil	Maamannan	Nominated	
2025	Best Actor – Malayalam	Aavesham	Nominated	
2025	Best Actor in a Negative Role – Telugu	Pushpa 2: The Rule	Nominated	

== Vanitha Film Awards ==
The Vanitha Film Awards are presented annually by Vanitha, an Indian magazine from the Malayala Manorama group in the South Indian state of Kerala. Fahadh has won three awards.

Year	Category	Film	Result	Ref.
2013	Best Actor	22 Female Kottayam & Diamond Necklace	Won	
2018	Best Actor	Thondimuthalum Driksakshiyum	Won	
2020	Best Film	Kumbalangi Nights	Won	

== Other awards ==
=== Chittara Star Awards ===
The Chittara Star Awards are an annual event that honors achievements in Kannada cinema, television, and fashion. Fahadh has received one nomination.

Year	Category	Work	Result	Ref.
2025	South Icon – Male	—N/a	Nominated	

=== Kerala Film Producers Association Awards ===
Year	Category	Film	Result	Ref.
2014	Best Actor	North 24 Kaatham & Annayum Rasoolum	Won	

=== Mazhavil Manorama Awards ===
The Mazhavil Manorama Awards are an annual event that honors achievements in Malayalam cinema and television, by Mazhavil Manorama magazine. Fahadh has won one award.

Year	Category	Film	Result	Ref.
2019	Best Actor	Njan Prakashan	Won	

=== North American Film Awards ===
Year	Category	Film	Result	Ref.
2018	Best Actor – Critics	Thondimuthalum Driksakshiyum	Won	

== Other recognitions ==
=== Media honours ===
Year	Honour	Magazine	Result	Ref.
2012	Best Malayalam Actor	Rediff.com	#1	
2013	Best Malayalam Actor	Rediff.com	#1	
2019	100 Greatest Performances of the Decade	Film Companion	#55 (Maheshinte Prathikaram)	
2019	100 Greatest Performances of the Decade	Film Companion	#70 (Thondimuthalum Driksakshiyum)	
2022	30 Most Influential Young Indians	GQ India	#22	

=== Times of India ===
Year	Category	Result	Ref.
2017	Kochi Times Most Desirable Men	#5	
2018	Kochi Times Most Desirable Men	#2	
2019	Kochi Times Most Desirable Men	#7	
2020	Kochi Times Most Desirable Men	#8	
