= SIIMA Award for Best Film – Malayalam =

South Indian International Movie Awards

- Awarded for: Best Malayalam-language film of the year
- Country: India
- Presented by: Vibri Media Group
- First award: 22 June 2012 (for films released in 2011)
- Most recent winner: Lokah Chapter 1: Chandra (2025)

The SIIMA Award for Best Film – Malayalam is an award, begun in 2012, presented annually at the South Indian International Movie Awards to a film and production house via viewers and the winner is announced at the ceremony. The nominations for the category are given by the jury members.

== Winners and nominees ==
Table key
‡	Indicates the winner

=== 2010s ===
Year (Note: Refers to the film's release year)	Film	Production House / Studio	Ref.
2011 (1st)	Indian Rupee ‡	August Cinema	
2012 (2nd)	Ustad Hotel ‡	Magic Frames	
2012 (2nd)	Ayalum Njanum Thammil	Prakash Movie Tone	
2012 (2nd)	Spirit	Aashirvad Cinemas	
2012 (2nd)	Ozhimuri	P N V Associates	
2012 (2nd)	Diamond Necklace	Anitha Productions, LJ Films	
2013 (3rd)	Drishyam ‡	Aashirvad Cinemas	
2013 (3rd)	Amen	White Sands Media House	
2013 (3rd)	North 24 Kaatham	E4 Entertainment	
2013 (3rd)	Annayum Rasoolum	D Cutz Film Company	
2013 (3rd)	Shutter	Abra Films	
2014 (4th)	Bangalore Days ‡	Anwar Rasheed Entertainments, Weekend Blockbusters	
2014 (4th)	Iyobinte Pusthakam	Amal Neerad Productions, Fahadh Faasil and Friends Pvt Ltd	
2014 (4th)	Ohm Shanthi Oshaana	Ananya Films	
2014 (4th)	How Old Are You?	Magic Frames	
2014 (4th)	Munnariyippu	Gold Coin Motion Pictures	
2015 (5th)	Premam ‡	Anwar Rasheed Entertainments	
2015 (5th)	Chandrettan Evideya	Handmade Films	
2015 (5th)	Charlie	Finding Cinema	
2015 (5th)	Ennu Ninte Moideen	Newton Movies	
2015 (5th)	Pathemari	Allens Media	
2016 (6th)	Kammatipaadam ‡	Global United Media	
2016 (6th)	Action Hero Biju	Pauly Jr. Pictures, Full On Studios	
2016 (6th)	Maheshinte Prathikaaram	OPM Dream Mill Cinemas	
2016 (6th)	Oppam	Aashirvad Cinemas	
2016 (6th)	Pulimurugan	Mulakuppadam Films	
2017 (7th)	Thondimuthalum Driksakshiyum ‡	Urvashi Theatres	
2017 (7th)	Angamaly Diaries	Friday Film House	
2017 (7th)	Mayanadi	Dream Mill Cinemas and Entertainments	
2017 (7th)	Parava	Anwar Rasheed Entertainments, The Movie Club	
2017 (7th)	Take Off	Rajesh Pillai Films	
2018 (8th)	Sudani from Nigeria ‡	Happy Hours Entertainments	
2018 (8th)	Aravindante Athidhikal	Pathiyara Entertainments, Big Bang Entertainments	
2018 (8th)	Ee.Ma.Yau.	OPM Cinemas, RGK Cinemas	
2018 (8th)	Kayamkulam Kochunni	Sree Gokulam Movies	
2018 (8th)	Varathan	Fahadh Faasil and Friends Pvt Ltd, Amal Neerad Productions	
2019 (9th)	Lucifer ‡	Aashirvad Cinemas	
2019 (9th)	Jallikattu	Opus Pent	
2019 (9th)	Kumbalangi Nights	Fahadh Faasil & Friends, Working Class Hero	
2019 (9th)	Unda	Moviee Mill, Gemini Studios	
2019 (9th)	Uyare	S Cube Films, Grihalakshmi Productions	

=== 2020s ===
Year	Film	Production House / Studio	Ref.
2020 (9th)	Ayyappanum Koshiyum ‡	Gold Coin Motion Picture Company	
2020 (9th)	Anjaam Pathiraa	Ashiq Usman Productions, Manual Movie Makers	
2020 (9th)	C U Soon	Fahadh Faasil & Friends	
2020 (9th)	Kappela	Kadhaas Untold	
2020 (9th)	Trance	Anwar Rasheed Entertainments	
2021 (10th)	Minnal Murali ‡	Weekend Blockbusters	
2021 (10th)	Kurup	Wayfarer Films, M Star Entertainments	
2021 (10th)	The Great Indian Kitchen	Mankind Cinemas, Symmetry Cinemas	
2021 (10th)	Thinkalazhcha Nishchayam	Pushkar Films	
2021 (10th)	Joji	Bhavana Studios, Working Class Hero, Fahadh Faasil and Friends	
2022 (11th)	Nna Thaan Case Kodu ‡	Kunchacko Boban Productions, Udaya Picture	
2022 (11th)	Bheeshma Parvam	Amal Neerad Productions	
2022 (11th)	Hridayam	Merryland Cinemas, Big Bang Entertainments	
2022 (11th)	Jaya Jaya Jaya Jaya Hey	Cheers Entertainments	
2022 (11th)	Jana Gana Mana	Prithviraj Productions, Magic Frames	
2022 (11th)	Thallumaala	Ashiq Usman Productions	
2023 (12th)	Nanpakal Nerathu Mayakkam ‡	Mammootty Kampany	
2023 (12th)	2018	Kavya Film Company, PK Prime Production	
2023 (12th)	Iratta	Appu Pathu Pappu Production House, Martin Prakkat Films	
2023 (12th)	Kaathal – The Core	Wayfarer Films	
2023 (12th)	Neru	Aashirvad Cinemas	
2024 (13th)	Manjummel Boys ‡	Parava Films	
2024 (13th)	Aadujeevitham	Visual Romance	
2024 (13th)	Aattam	Joy Movie Productions	
2024 (13th)	Aavesham	Anwar Rasheed Entertainments, Fahadh Faasil and Friends	
2024 (13th)	Bramayugam	Night Shift Studios, YNOT Studios	
2024 (13th)	Kishkindha Kaandam	Goodwill Entertainments	
2025 (14th)	Lokah Chapter 1: Chandra ‡	Wayfarer Films	
2025 (14th)	Eko	Aaradyaa Studios	
2025 (14th)	L2: Empuraan	Aashirvad Cinemas, Lyca Productions and Sree Gokulam Movies	
2025 (14th)	Ponman	Ajith Vinayaka Films	
2025 (14th)	Sarvam Maya	Firefly Films and Akhil Sathyan Films	
2025 (14th)	Thudarum	Rejaputhra Visual Media	
