= Vishnu Govind =

Indian sound designer, sound editor & re-recording mixer

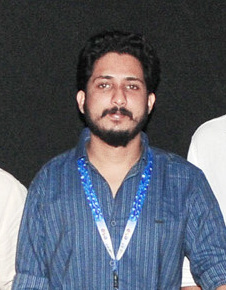
- Vishnu Govind in 2017
- Education: Film and Television Institute of Tamil Nadu
- Occupations: Sound designer; sound editor; re-recording mixer
- Years active: 2012 – present

Vishnu Govind (born 15 January 1986) is an Indian re-recording mixer, sound designer and sound editor. He has worked in over 150 films in Malayalam, Tamil, Hindi and Telugu languages. He won the National Film Award for Best Audiography (Re-recordist of the final mixed track) for the Malayalam film Malik (2020). Govind is also a recipient of the Kerala State Film Award for Best Sound Design along with Sree Sankar, for the films Unda (2018) and Ishq (2019).

== Early life ==
A native of Thiruvalla, Govind attended St. Berchmans College, Changanassery, graduating in Physics. While at St. Berchmans, he met future sound designer/editor Sree Sankar with whom he has collaborated on a number of projects. Since they both shared keen interest in music and movies, they became friends and eventually set off to pursue a career in Audio Engineering.

In 2006, Govind enrolled in the graduate program of Film and Television Institute of Tamil Nadu (FTIT), formerly known as Adayar Film Institute, for Sound Engineering & Sound Recording. During his time in college, he encountered and became friends with Alphonse Puthren, Karthik Subbaraj, Nalan Kumarasamy, Vijay Sethupathi, Bobby Simha, Rajesh Murgeshan and Shabareesh Varma; all of these men would go on to be successful filmmakers, actors and musicians.

== Career ==
Govind started his career as an ADR recordist in AVM Studios, Chennai. He first worked on Alphonse Puthren's short film Neram (2012) before quitting the job to focus entirely on films. His feature film debut came with Karthik Subbaraj's Tamil film, Pizza (2012). The film marked the start of his partnership with Sree Sankar and they went on to establish their studio, Sound Factor.

Govind and Sankar had created a sound script for Pizza(2012) and used the most advanced audio format for cinema available at the time and incidentally becoming the first South Indian film mixed in Dolby 7.1 surround sound. The film was received well by audiences and critics alike. M.Suganth of The Times of India noted "While Resul Pookutty's Oscar win in 2009 created an awareness of this community, in Tamil cinema, it was Pizza in 2012, that made people sit up and take notice of sound design." They were nominated for the Mirchi Music Awards for Best Sound Mixing that year for designing the soundscape of the film and went on to collaborate with Karthik Subbaraj in his two future films - Jigarthanda (2014) and Iraivi (2016). The former set a landmark by becoming the first South Indian film to be mixed in Dolby Atmos.

Govind along with Sankar made his Malayalam film debut with Neram(2013) and went on to work with its director, Alphonse Puthren in Premam (2015) and Gold (2022). Starting in 2017, with Soubin Shahir's debut film Parava, Govind has also served as the re-recording mixer for a number of films. The duo won two consecutive Behindwoods Gold Medal for Best Sound for Iruthi Suttru(2016) and Aval(2017). Both these Tamil films were remade in Hindi as Saala Khadoos (2016) and House Next Door (2017) respectively. He won the Kerala State Film Award for Best Sound Design for the films Unda (2018) and Ishq (2019), which he shared with Sankar.

In 2020, he teamed up with Mahesh Narayanan for his films C U Soon and Malik. Having previously collaborated with Narayanan in Take Off(2017) as its sound designer, Govind handled the design, editing and mixing of sound for Malik. The film's theatrical release was delayed due to the COVID-19 pandemic and eventually got released on Amazon Prime Video in 2021. It received mostly positive responses from the critics. Behindwoods wrote: "The sound design was fabulous. The presence of deep bass at the time of actions and the perfect balance of ambience sound with the dialogues that carried an intensity made the scenes much more effective". The film earned him his first National Film Award for Best Audiography (Re-recordist of the final mixed track). The jury appreciated him for "creating a life like ambience through a dextrous audio scope."

Govind worked with A.R Rahman for the film Malayankunju (2022), which marked Rahman's return to Malayalam cinema as a composer, after a hiatus of 28 years. In an interview with The Hindu, Sajimon Prabhakar, director of the film said, "It was not an easy project for the sound designers. We don't know what are the sounds that one can hear under the ground. They had no references as well." Govind used Dolby Atmos, an immersive sound format, to mix the sound in the film. Following its release, the reception was generally positive with the film receiving praises for its scope, ambition and technical aspects. Lalitha Suhasini, former editor of Rolling Stone India wrote "The movie's soundscape brings to mind Danny Boyle's 2010 film 127 Hours, both incidentally scored by A.R. Rahman. Govind makes us feel stuck with Anikuttan by creating a brilliantly lulling silence in the film." Nirmal Jovial of The Week wrote "Malayankunju is a film that deserves a theatrical watch. The kind of experience it offers on a small screen will not be comparable to that on the big screen."

Since 2020, he has worked on the sound and mixing of numerous films, notably Anjaam Pathiraa (2020), Soorarai Pottru (2020), Ayyappanum Koshiyum (2020), Operation Java (2021), Kaanekkaane (2021), Mahaveeryar (2022), and Thallumala (2022).

In 2023, Govind worked on the design and mixing of sound for the film 2018, The film received generally positive reviews and became the highest grossing Malayalam film of all time at the box office. Vijayalakshmi Narayanan of The Free Press Journal wrote "Akhil George's cinematography, coupled with Mohandas' production design and Vishnu Govind's sound, creates the sense of urgency and palpable tension, that will leave your heart pounding in instances, more than once."

In 2024, Govind handled the sound design and mixing for Aavesham, which emerged as one of the highest-grossing Malayalam films of all time, and Rifle Club.

In 2025, Govind worked on Pravinkoodu Shappu. Vignesh Madhu of The New Indian Express wrote "Vishnu Govind's atmospheric sound design also plays a significant part in holding our interest in this world." The review further observed how ambient details such as “faint sounds of doves cooing, glasses clinking, or a boiling curry in the background” enriched the film's toddy shop setting. Among other works that year, Govind's audiography in Alappuzha Gymkhana was described as "top-notch" by Anandu Suresh of The Indian Express. Later that year, he also praised his work for Thudarum "as equally brilliant" alongside Jakes Bejoy's songs and background score. Thudarum emerged as one of the highest-grossing Malayalam films of all tiime and was regarded by critics as a return to form for Mohanlal. Govind also worked on the mystery crime thriller Eko, which received positive responses from critics and audiences. Jijo Alex of The Times of India described his contribution to the film as “world class sound design”, while Aswin Bharadwaj of Lensmen Reviews observed that Govind's "immersive sound design plays a key role" in transporting viewers into the film's world, particularly through the enhancement of environmental sound elements and animal growls.

As of 2026, Govind has continued to work on projects that attracted attention from critics and audiences alike, including Sambhavam Adhyayam Onnu (2026) and the big-budget multi-starrer action thriller, Patriot (2026), which marked his fourth collaboration with filmmaker Mahesh Narayanan. Vivek Santosh of The New Indian Express noted that the film's “atmospheric audio” heightened its eerie mood and sense of unease. Aswin Bharadwaj of Lensmen Reviews observed that Sambhavam Adhyayam Onnu employed techniques like “exploring the sound design to achieve the desired dramatic impact on screen”, while in Patriot, he wrote that "the sound design elevates the overall rawness" of the film. When the Tamil Nadu State Film Awards for 2020 were announced in 2026, Govind won the Best Audiographer Award for Soorarai Pottru, which he shared with Sree Sankar.

== Selected filmography ==
Year	Title	Language	Notes
2012	Pizza	Tamil	Nominated for Mirchi Music Award: Best Sound Mixing
2013	Neram	Malayalam, Tamil & Telugu	
2013	Soodhu Kavvum	Tamil	
2014	Jigarthanda	Tamil	
2015	Premam	Malayalam	
2015	Charlie	Malayalam	
2016	Iruthi Suttru / Saala Khadoos	Tamil & Hindi	
2016	Action Hero Biju	Malayalam	
2016	Jil Jung Juk	Tamil	
2016	Kadhalum Kadandhu Pogum	Tamil	
2016	Iraivi	Tamil	
2016	Oppam	Malayalam	
2017	Parava	Malayalam	
2017	Take off	Malayalam	
2017	Solo	Malayalam & Tamil	
2017	Aval / House Next Door	Tamil & Hindi	
2018	Agnyaathavasi	Telugu	
2019	Valmiki	Telugu	
2019	Uyare	Malayalam	
2019	Porinju Mariyam Jose	Malayalam	
2019	Unda	Malayalam	Kerala State Film Award for Best Sound Design
2019	Ishq	Malayalam	Kerala State Film Award for Best Sound Design
2020	Soorarai Portru	Tamil	Tamil Nadu State Film Award for Best Sound Design
2020	Anjaam Pathiraa	Malayalam	
2020	Ayyappanum Koshiyum	Malayalam	
2020	C U Soon	Malayalam	
2021	Malik	Malayalam	National Film Award for Best Audiography
2021	Kaanekkane	Malayalam	
2022	Malayankunju	Malayalam	Kerala Film Critics Association Award for Best Sound Recording
2022	Paappan	Malayalam	
2022	Mahaveeryar	Malayalam	
2022	Thallumala	Malayalam	
2022	Gold	Malayalam	
2022	Saudi Vellakka	Malayalam	
2022	Ariyippu	Malayalam	
2023	Neelavelicham	Malayalam	
2023	2018	Malayalam	
2023	Neymar	Malayalam	
2023	Nalla Nilavulla Ratri	Malayalam	
2023	Antony	Malayalam	
2024	Aavesham	Malayalam	
2024	Golam	Malayalam	
2024	Adios Amigo	Malayalam	
2024	Sookshma Darshini	Malayalam	
2024	Rifle Club	Malayalam	
2025	Pravinkoodu Shappu	Malayalam	
2025	Alappuzha Gymkhana	Malayalam	
2025	Painkili	Malayalam	
2025	Maranamass	Malayalam	
2025	Thudarum	Malayalam	
2025	Balti	Malayalam	
2025	The Pet Detective	Malayalam	
2025	Eko	Malayalam	
2026	Sambhavam Adhyayam Onnu	Malayalam	
2026	Patriot	Malayalam	
2026	Mollywood Times	Malayalam	
2026	Thudakkam	Malayalam	
2026	Cosmic Samson †	Malayalam	
TBA	Athimanoharam †	Malayalam	
TBA	Mattanchery Mafia †	Malayalam	

Key
†	Denotes films that have not yet been released

== Awards ==
- 2019: Kerala State Film Awards for Best Sound Design along with Sree Sankar for Unda & Ishq
- 2020: National Film Awards for Best Audiography(Re-recordist of the final mixed track) for Malik
- 2020: Tamil Nadu State Film Awards for Best Audiography along with Sree Sankar for Soorarai Portru
- 2022: Kerala Film Critics Association Awards for the Best Sound Recording for Malayankunju
- 2024: Indian Recording Arts Academy (IRAA) Award for Best Sound Mixing (Film or Web Release) - Regional for Neelavelicham
