= Tamil Nadu State Film Award for Best Audiographer =

Indian film award

The Tamil Nadu State Film Award for Best Audiographer is given by the state government as part of its annual Tamil Nadu State Film Awards for Tamil-language (Kollywood) films.

== The list ==
Here is a list of the recipients and the films for which they won.

Year	Audiographer	Film
2020	Vishnu Govind, Sree Sankar	Soorarai Pottru
2015	AL Thukaram, J. Maheshwaran	Thakka Thakka
2014	Raj Krishnan	Cuckoo
2013	Thapas Nayak	Raja Rani
2012	M. Ravi	Neethane En Ponvasantham
2011	U.K.I. Ayyapan	Many films
2010	G. Tharanipathy	Yaathumaagi
2009	T. Udayakumar	Peraanmai
2008	Ravi	Vaaranam Aayiram
2007	UK Iyappan	Billa
2005	A. S. Laxmi Narayanan	Anniyan
2002	Ganesan	Ramana
2001	Sathya	Chocolate
2000	Shivakumar	Rhythm
1999	G. Ravi	Minsara Kanna
1998	A. R. Swaminathan	Kadhal Mannan
1997	Iyappan	Suryavamsam
1996	H. Sridhar	Karuppu Roja
1988	K. Sampath	Senthoora Poove

== See also ==
- Tamil cinema
- Cinema of India
