= Kaiyethum Doorath =

2002 Malayalam-language romance film

- Poster
- Directed by: Fazil
- Written by: Fazil
- Produced by: Fazil
- Starring: Fahadh Faasil; Nikita; Revathy
- Cinematography: Anandakuttan
- Edited by: T. R. Sekhar
- Music by: Ouseppachan
- Release date: 27 September 2002
- Country: India
- Language: Malayalam

Kaiyethum Doorath (transl. Within the hand's reach) is a 2002 Indian Malayalam-language romance film written, directed and produced by Fazil. The film was the acting debut of Fazil's son Fahadh Faasil (credited as Shaanu) who co-starred with Nikita Thukral. Mammootty appeared in a cameo role. It was an Onam release and was a box-office disaster.

== Cast ==
- Fahadh Faasil as Sachin Madhavan (credited as Shaanu)
- Nikitha as Sushma
- Mammootty as Adv. Gopinath (cameo appearance)
- Rajan P. Dev as Prof. Sadasivan
- Revathy as Dr. Omana Babunath
- Siddique as Babunath
- Sudheesh as Tony
- Harishree Ashokan as Appunni
- Cochin Haneefa as Kundara Sharangan
- Janardanan as Passenger in the boat
- Augustine as Passenger in the boat
- K. P. A. C. Lalitha as Bhanumathi
- Yadukrishnan as Vijayaraghavan
- Narayanankutty as Passenger in the boat
- Vishnu Prasad as Hari
- Jolly Easo as Ramani
- Abhinay as Kishore
- Soubin Shahir as Bus Passenger (uncredited role)

== Production ==
Asin and Prithviraj Sukumaran had auditioned for the lead roles. During the making of the film, Fazil had contemplated remaking the film in Tamil with Madhavan in the lead role, but later opted against the idea.

== Music ==
All lyrics are written by S. Ramesan Nair; all music is composed by Ouseppachan.

No.	Title	Artist(s)	Length
1.	"Aadyamaay"	Rajesh Vijay
2.	"Akkayyilikkayyille"	K. J. Yesudas
3.	"Aravindanayana"	Sujatha Mohan
4.	"Asalasalaay"	M. G. Sreekumar, Biju Narayanan, Franco Simon, Gopi Sundar
5.	"Gokulathil"	K. S. Chithra, Vidhu Prathap
6.	"Poove Oru Manimutham"	Sujatha Mohan, Dr. Fahadh
7.	"Priyasakhi"	K. J. Yesudas, K. S. Chitra
8.	"Vasantharaavin"	Sujatha Mohan, Vijay Yesudas

== Reception ==
A critic from Sify wrote that "If you are looking forward to see a clean and entertaining love story for Onam go ahead and see the film". A critic from Cinesouth wrote that "Flashbacks are nothing new for cinema, but this style always carries the distinct individuality of the director. Fazil, in his style, has made this a heady mixture of love, scenic locations great music and emotions". A critic from Deccan Herald wrote that "Contrived song and dance sequences hardly add to the already lack lustre storyline. Fazil is said to have worked hard for the success of this film which introduces his son Shaanu. But, all that effort seems to have gone in vain".
