= Malayankunju =

2022 film directed by Sajimon Prabhakar

- Theatrical release poster
- Directed by: Sajimon Prabhakar
- Written by: Mahesh Narayanan
- Produced by: Fazil
- Starring: Fahadh Faasil; Rajisha Vijayan; Indrans; Jaffar Idukki; Deepak Parambol
- Cinematography: Mahesh Narayanan
- Edited by: Arju Benn
- Music by: A. R. Rahman
- Production companies: Fahadh Faasil & Friends
- Distributed by: Century Release
- Release date: 22 July 2022
- Running time: 114 minutes
- Country: India
- Language: Malayalam

Malayankunju is a 2022 Indian Malayalam-language survival drama film directed by Sajimon Prabhakar (in his directorial debut) and written by Mahesh Narayanan, who also handles the cinematography of the film. It stars Fahadh Faasil, Rajisha Vijayan, Indrans, Jaffar Idukki and Deepak Parambol. Arju Benn handled the editing, while the soundtrack and background score were composed by A. R. Rahman. The film released on 22 July 2022 to critical acclaim.

== Plot ==
Anikkuttan is a service mechanic who repairs all electronic devices from home. He is not mentally stable after his father Radhakrishnan hung himself to death when Anikkuttan's sister Sandhya eloped with her lover Deepu on the night before her wedding. Anikkuttan hates his sister and refuses to talk or even let his mother go there. The reason for the hate is not just his father's death, but also that Deepu is from a lower caste. Anikkuttan hates his neighbor Suni for the same reason and has frequent fights with them when Suni's newborn daughter cries in the middle of the night and disturbs Anikkuttan's sleep.

The government releases public service announcements that everyone should move to shelter homes. Anikkuttan refuses to go, stating that it is just a publicity stunt from the government and that he has to share amenities with other castes. Anikkuttan gets an invite for Suni's baby's 28th day ceremony. There, he gets particularly upset because his mother gifts a gold bangle to Suni's baby without asking him; this makes his relationship with Suni's family worse. That night, the rain gets worse, and Suni and his family decide to move to a shelter home, but Anikkuttan refuses to go and says he will stay back with his mother. But soon after Anikkuttan goes to bed, a landslide happens in that area, and he gets trapped under the soil.

Anikkuttan becomes unconscious and is underwater when his father comes into his dream and rescues him and tells him that people are divided by caste only until death, after which all are forever sleeping equally in the soil. He asks him to save the baby, whose cries can be heard. Anikkuttan regains consciousness and fights back his way up. He calls the names of Suni, his mom, and others, but no one responds. Suddenly he hears the sound of Ponni, Suni's baby daughter, and frantically searches for her. He also finds the dead body of Divakaran on the way. He finally manages to find the baby and hold her close before the rescuers find them and take them to the hospital. All others' lives are lost.

At the hospital, Sandhya and Deepu come to help Anikkuttan. He slowly walks towards the children's ICU and finds Ponni there. He happily accepts Ponni as his daughter as she is the only one left for him.

== Cast ==
- Fahadh Faasil as Anil Kumar aka Anikuttan, an electronics technician
  - Alister Alex as Young Anikuttan
- Rajisha Vijayan as Sandhya, Anikuttan's sister
- Indrans as Surendran
- Jaffar Idukki as Radhakrishnan, Anikkuttan's father
- Arjun Ashokan as Deepu, Sandhya's husband
- Deepak Parambol as Sumesh, Anikuttan's friend
- Deepu Navaikulam as Suni
- Johny Antony as Francis
- Jaya S Kurup as Shanthamma, Anikkuttan's mother
- Nilja K Baby as Shiny, Poulose's daughter
- Jose M. V. as Chandradasan, station writer
- Binu Manambur as Divakaran
- Irshad as Poulose
- Chali Pala
- Meera Krishnan as Viji
- Remya Suresh as Nurse
- Kiran Peethambaram as SI
- Elizabeth Maria Joseph as Sandhya's friend attending wedding

== Production ==
Mahesh Narayanan, who had previously worked with Fahadh in Take Off, C U Soon and Mālik approached Fazil with the story. Fazil liked the story and agreed to bankroll the film. Also, Sajimon Prabhakar, who worked as associate director in the films Ente Ummante Peru and Android Kunjappan Version 5.25, was confirmed as the director. Rajisha Vijayan was opted in to play the female lead opposite Fahadh.

Principal photography began on 28 January 2021 at Aruvithura following COVID-19 protocols. Filming continued in different locations at Aruvithura and Ernakulam and finished the first schedule after 26 days shoot. During the second schedule, while filming a stunt scene on 2 March 2021, Fahadh fell from a height, suffered a nose injury and underwent a surgery next day. Sushin Shyam was selected as the music composer. However, he was replaced by A. R. Rahman.

== Music ==
The original songs and background score were composed by A. R. Rahman, returning to the Malayalam film industry after 29 years. The first single "Cholappenne" sung by Vijay Yesudas was released on 12 July 2022, the second title "Mannum Niranje" sung by Swetha Mohan was released on 19 July 2022 and the third song "Ponni Makale" sung by K. S. Chithra is a film version and while not included in the album initially, it was later included in the album four years later in July 2026.

Track listing
No.	Title	Lyrics	Singer(s)	Length
1.	"Cholappenne"	Vinayak Sasikumar	Vijay Yesudas	3:42
2.	"Mannum Niranje"	Vinayak Sasikumar	Swetha Mohan	3:17
3.	"Ponni Makale"	Vinayak Sasikumar	K. S. Chithra	1:39
Total length:				6:59

== Reception ==
On the review aggregator website Rotten Tomatoes, 100% of 6 critics' reviews are positive, with an average rating of 6.8/10.

Sajin Shriijth of Cinema Express gave 4/5 stars and wrote, "Every time there is a natural disaster, we hear inspiring stories about the union of different people who otherwise would've never met or even dared to due to various factors, some of which could be their internal prejudices. Malayankunju is a representation of such a story."

Manoj Kumar R of The Indian Express gave 3.5/5 stars and wrote, "Mahesh Narayanan’s camera takes the audience along in the journey of Anil’s rebirth. And Fahadh Faasil delivers a natural performance as a complex man, who is not likeable but also not fully worthy of our contempt. The sound design of the rumbling clouds provides an effective soundscape for rain-drenched frames. And AR Rahman’s background music adds to the drama." Anna M.M. Vetticad of Firstpost gave 3.25/5 stars and wrote, "Fahadh Faasil is beautifully restrained in Malayankunju, a technically exceptional film that is, however, equal parts remarkable and debatable in its portrayal of casteism."

Sowmya Rajendran of The News Minute wrote, "Despite its flaws though, Malayankunju makes for a fairly engaging watch and is among the better survival thrillers to come out in recent times. Fahadh and the technical crew make sure of that." Akilan Nagarajan of Film Companion wrote, "This is a well-designed survival film that underplays much of its drama, very much in line with how Mahesh Narayanan's directorial works have come to function. It may not be as emotionally effective and impactful as other popular entries in the genre, but that it approaches a familiar story with such rootedness, makes it a fairly commendable effort." Athira M of The Hindu wrote, "Malayankunju is a lesson on what it takes to survive in a mishap, depicted without melodrama."
