= Kerala State Film Award for Second Best Actor =

Annual Indian film award

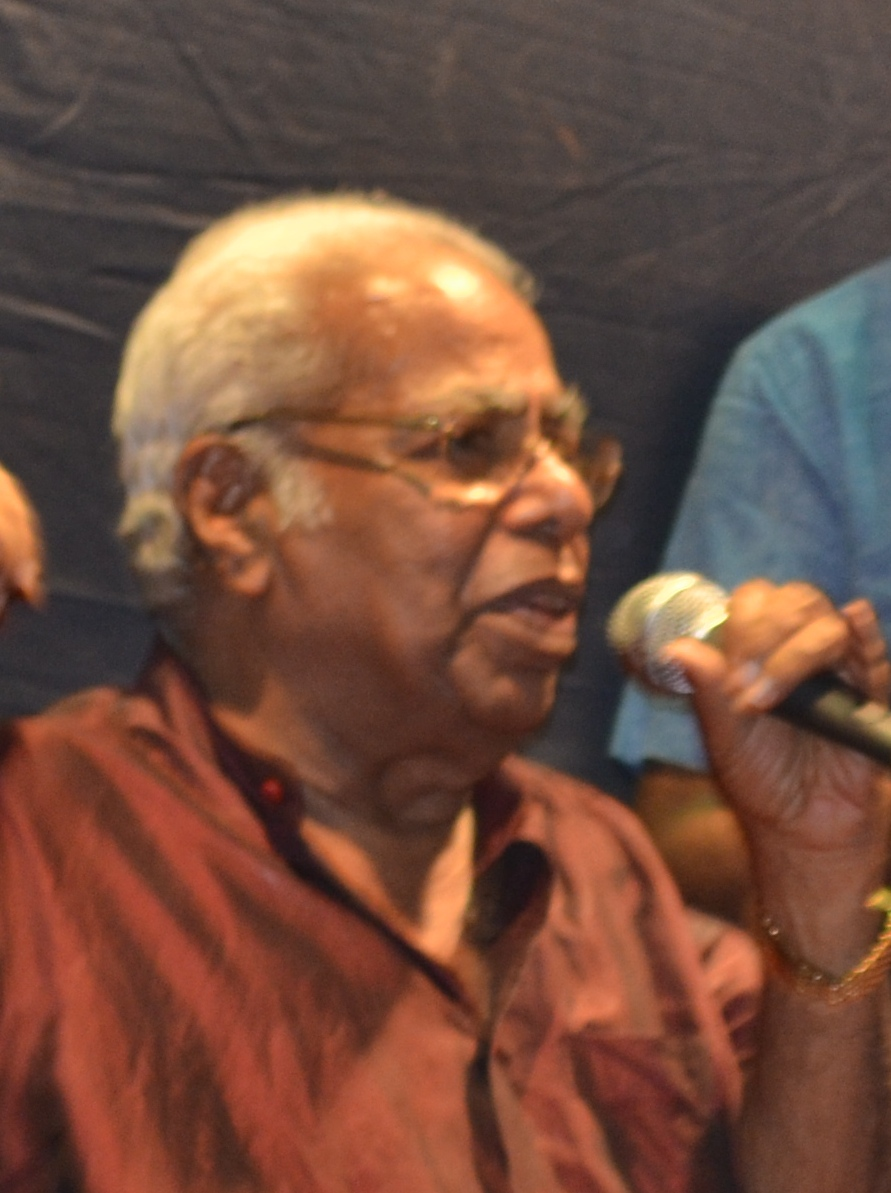
- Most frequent recipient: Thilakan
- Awarded for: Best performance by an actor in a Malayalam film
- Sponsored by: Kerala State Chalachitra Academy
- First award: 1969
- Final award: 2014
- Most winner: Thilakan (6)

Highlights
- Total awarded: 46
- First winner: Kottarakkara Sreedharan Nair
- Last winner: Anoop Menon

The Kerala State Film Award for Second Best Actor was an award presented annually from 1969 to 2014 at the Kerala State Film Awards of India. The Kerala State Film Awards is managed by the Kerala State Chalachitra Academy, an autonomous non-profit institution working under the Department of Cultural Affairs, Government of Kerala. Rahman is the youngest recipient at age 16 for Koodevide (1983). The award was discontinued in 2014 and was succeeded by the Kerala State Film Award for Best Character Actor from 2015 onwards.

== Superlatives ==
Number of times	Recipient
6	Thilakan
3	Nedumudi Venu, Manoj K. Jayan
2	Sankaradi, Bahadoor, Balan K. Nair, Nellikode Bhaskaran, Oduvil Unnikrishnan, Jagathy Sreekumar, Murali, Biju Menon, Anoop Menon

== Winners ==
Year	Actor	Film	Ref.
1969	Kottarakkara Sreedharan Nair	Koottukudumbam	
1970	Sankaradi	Vazhvemayam, Ezhuthatha Kadha	
1971	Sankaradi	Sindooracheppu	
1972	Nellikodu Bhaskaran	Maram	
1973	Bahadoor	Madhavikutty	
1974	Balan K. Nair	Athithi	
1975	M. G. Soman	Swapnadanam, Chuvanna Sandhyakal	
1976	Bahadoor	Aalinganam, Thulavarsham	
1977	S. P. Pillai	Taxi Driver	
1978	Balan K. Nair	Thacholi Ambu	
1979	Nellikodu Bhaskaran	Sarapancharam	
1980	Nedumudi Venu	Chamaram	
1981	Mammootty	Ahimsa	
1982	Thilakan	Yavanika	
1983	Rahman	Koodevide?	
1984	Adoor Bhasi	April 18	
1985	Thilakan	Yathra, Irakal	
1986	Thilakan & Nedumudi Venu	Panchagni, Thalavattam	
1987	Thilakan	Thaniyavarthanam	
1988	Thilakan	Mukthi, Dhwani	
1989	Innocent	Mazhavilkavadi, Jaathakam	
1990	Murali	Amaram	
1991	Jagathy Sreekumar	Apoorvam Chilar, Kilukkam	
1992	Manoj K. Jayan	Sargam	
1993	Narendra Prasad	Paithrukam	
1994	Nedumudi Venu	Thenmavin Kombath	
1995	Oduvil Unnikrishnan	Kathapurushan	
1996	Oduvil Unnikrishnan	Thooval Kottaram	
1997	Biju Menon	Krishnagudiyil Oru Pranayakalathu	
1998	Thilakan	Kaattathoru Pen Poovu	
1999	M. R. Gopakumar	Gopalan Nairude Thadi	
2000	Jayaram	Swayamvarapandal	
2001	Cochin Haneefa	Soothradharan	
2002	Jagathy Sreekumar	Nizhalkuthu, Meesa Madhavan	
2003	Siddique	Sasneham Sumithra, Choonda	
2004	Lalu Alex	Manjupoloru Penkutti	
2005	Salim Kumar	Achanurangatha Veedu	
2006	Sai Kumar	Anandabhairavi	
2007	Murali	Veeralipattu, Pranayakalam	
2008	Anoop Menon	Thirakkatha	
2009	Manoj K. Jayan	Pazhassi Raja	
2010	Biju Menon	T. D. Dasan Std. VI B	
2011	Fahadh Faasil	Akam, Chaappa Kurish	
2012	Manoj K. Jayan	Kaliyachan	
2013	Ashok Kumar	CR No: 89	
2014	Anoop Menon	1983, Vikramadithyan	

== See also ==
- Kerala State Film Award for Best Character Actor
