= Irul =

2021 film by Naseef Yusuf Izuddin

- Promotional poster
- Directed by: Naseef Yusuf Izuddin
- Written by: Sunil Yadav
- Produced by: Anto Joseph; Jomon T. John; Shameer Muhammed
- Starring: Fahadh Faasil; Soubin Shahir; Darshana Rajendran
- Cinematography: Jomon T. John
- Edited by: Shameer Muhammed
- Music by: Sreerag Saji
- Production companies: Anto Joseph Film Company; Plan J Studios
- Distributed by: Netflix
- Release date: 2 April 2021
- Running time: 91 minutes
- Country: India
- Language: Malayalam

Irul (transl. Darkness) is a 2021 Indian Malayalam-language mystery horror film directed by Naseef Yusuf Izuddin (in his directorial debut). The film is jointly produced by Anto Joseph Film Company and Plan J Studios, which stars Fahadh Faasil, Soubin Shahir and Darshana Rajendran. The film was released on streaming platform Netflix on 2 April 2021.

== Plot ==
Alex Parayil, a writer and businessman, and his girlfriend Archana Pillai plan to take a weekend off with no cell phones, where Alex plans Archana a surprise. En route, their car breaks down in the rain, and the couple attempt to take shelter at a nearby house. At the house, they are taken in by the owner of the house, who tells them the telephone line is not working on account of the storm and permits them to stay the night. The trio gets to talking during which the eccentric house owner criticizes Alex's book, ‘‘Irul’’, based on a real-life serial killer who killed five women brutally, as being inaccurate and heavily imaginative, rather than relying on actual facts and information. He comments that the motive of the killer for the killing was out of inquisitiveness, whilst Alex's told it was due to vengeance against women.

Mid-conversation, the power supply in the house gets cut, and Alex and the owner attempt to locate the main switch of the electricity in the basement. Suddenly, a gunshot is heard, and when Archana follows the sound, she sees Alex dragging the unconscious house owner back to the living room and tying him up, accusing the latter of being the serial killer upon whom Alex's book was based. The owner wakes up and denies this, saying he is a thief named Unni who broke in and disconnected the phone line, but Alex refuses to allow Archana to make any call to the police, revealing that the house is his. Alex then reveals how he planned to bring Archana there and propose to her, but was surprised to find a stranger in his house, but decided to play along with, out of curiosity. They both provide contradicting stories of what happened in the basement, saying there was the corpse of a girl in there who was killed in the same manner as the serial killings, as Alex and Unni blame the murders on each other. Archana begins to question Alex's innocence, as Unni reveals he found multiple rings in the house as opposed to the one ring that Alex showed, a gun that belonged to Alex, and the fact that Alex bought a cellphone when he prohibited Archana from doing so.

Eventually, the three land in the basement to check the corpse, where Alex begins to assault Unni, while Archana attempts to fire at Alex. Alex, on Unni's provocation, decides to kill and bury the latter, as Archana still thinks that Alex is the killer. When Alex tries to prove his innocence, Archana accidentally shoots him in the stomach. As Alex begins to succumb to the wound and asks Archana to leave the house, Unni creeps from behind her and gets her to pull the trigger, revealing himself as the killer. The following day, news of the discovery of the three corpses of Alex, Archana and the girl identified as Vani Balan, is telecast with the report that the killer is still at large.

== Cast ==
- Fahadh Faasil as Unni
- Soubin Shahir as Alex Parayil, a novelist and also a businessman who loves Archana Pillai
- Darshana Rajendran as Archana Pillai, an advocate who loves Alex Parayil
- Jipa John as Vani balan, sixth victim.
- Mashar Hamsa as bookstore staff

== Production ==
Naseef Yusuf Izuddin worked as an assistant director in Bollywood films such as Kai Po Che!, Happy New Year, Raees, Newton, and Tumbbad. In September 2020, Naseef announced his directorial debut with a Malayalam film with Fahadh Faasil, Soubin Shahir and Darshana Rajendran titled as Irul with Plan J Studios, which earlier produced Thanneer Mathan Dinangal had bankrolled the film jointly with Anto Joseph Film Company. It is said to be a "riveting thriller" film only featuring three pivotal characters. The shooting of the film took place at Kuttikkanam on 16 September 2020. It is said to be a 30-days straight shoot within a single schedule, with most of the film being set indoors and was shot adhering to the COVID-19 safety protocols. Fahadh's second film to be shot during the COVID-19 lockdown; the team had completed production on 20 October 2020.

== Marketing and release ==
The trailer for the film was released by Netflix India on 18 March 2021, highlighting the film's scheduled release through Netflix on 2 April 2021.

It is also available in Hindi & Marathi language dubbed versions currently streaming on Ultra Play & Ultra Jhakaas app respectively. Telugu version named as "Aparadhi" is currently streaming on "Aha" OTT platform.

== Reception ==
=== Critical response ===
The film received mixed reviews from critics. On the review aggregator website Rotten Tomatoes, 0% of 5 critics' reviews are positive, with an average rating of 4.8/10.

Shubhra Gupta from The Indian Express shared her review on the film stating "The set-up of this Fahadh Faasil and Soubin Shahir starrer has promise and the actors are up for it too. However, the story-telling lets them down." Anna MM Vetticad from Firstpost stated "Fahadh Faasil, Darshana Rajendran thriller is a damp squib." Janani K from India Today wrote in her review "Fahadh Faasil, Soubin Shahir and Darshana Rajendran will make you go wow with their performance. But, director Naseef Yusuf Izuddin and writer Sunil Yadav's work leaves you wanting closure."
