= Fahadh Faasil =

Indian actor and producer (born 1982)

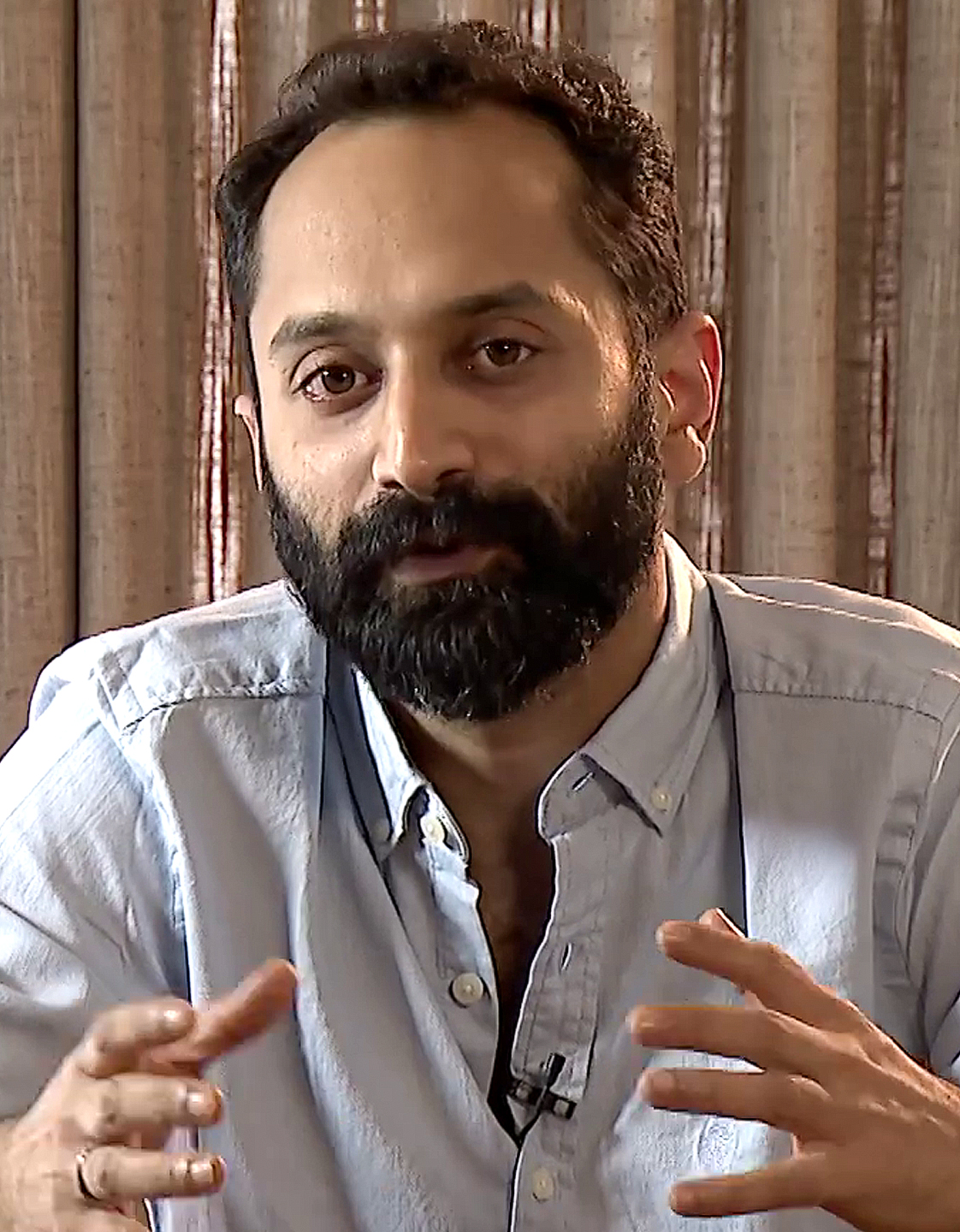
- Fahadh in 2019
- Born: 8 August 1982 (age 44); Alappuzha, Kerala, India
- Other names: FaFa; Shaanu
- Education: Sanatana Dharma College, Alappuzha; University of Miami
- Occupations: Actor; producer
- Years active: 2002–present
- Organizations: Fahadh Faasil and Friends; Bhavana Studios
- Works: Full list
- Spouse: Nazriya Nazim (m. 2014)
- Father: Fazil
- Family: Fazil family
- Awards: Full list

Abdul Hameed Mohammed Fahad Fazil (born 8 August 1982), professionally known as Fahadh Faasil, is an Indian actor and producer who primarily works in Malayalam and Tamil films. Noted for his diverse portrayals, Fahadh is considered among the finest actors of Indian cinema. One of the highest-paid and most popular Malayalam actors, Fahadh is a recipient of several accolades including a National Film Award, four Kerala State Film Awards and four Filmfare Awards South.

Born to filmmaker Fazil, Fahadh began his career at the age of 20 with his father's 2002 romantic film Kaiyethum Doorath, which was a critical and commercial failure. Post a hiatus of seven years, Fahadh returned to films with the anthology Kerala Cafe (2009) and attained public attention for his role in the thrillers Chaappa Kurishu (2011) and Akam (2011), winning the Kerala State Film Award for Second Best Actor for both these films.

Fahadh further achieved critical acclaim and commercial success with the thriller 22 Female Kottayam (2012), romantic-dramas Diamond Necklace (2012) and Annayum Rasoolum (2013), black-comedy Amen (2013), adventure drama North 24 Kaatham (2013), drama Artist (2013), and the romantic-comedy Oru Indian Pranayakadha (2013). While, 22 Female Kottayam and North 24 Kaatham won him the Filmfare Award for Best Actor – Malayalam, Artist and North 24 Kaatham won him the Kerala State Film Award for Best Actor. Following this, he starred in one of the highest-grossing Malayalam films, the coming-of-age drama Bangalore Days (2014).

Along with few box office failures, Fahadh continued to earn praises for his portrayals in the comedy-drama Maheshinte Prathikaaram (2016), survival thriller Take Off (2017), crime drama Thondimuthalum Driksakshiyum (2017), which won him the National Film Award for Best Supporting Actor and his third Filmfare Best Actor – Malayalam award, satirical comedy Njan Prakashan (2018), action thriller Varathan (2018) and crime drama Joji (2021). Fahadh has since earned national recognition with his performance in the drama Kumbalangi Nights (2019), political thriller Malik (2021), action thriller Vikram (2022) and action comedy Aavesham (2024).

Fahadh is a celebrity endorser for several brands and products and is a philanthropist. Fahadh is married to actress Nazriya Nazim. He co-owns the production company Fahadh Faasil and Friends with his wife and has a digital entertainment company named Bhavana Studios, co-partnered with Dileesh Pothan and Syam Pushkaran.

== Early life and background ==
Fahadh Faasil was born as Abdul Hameed Mohammed Fahad Fazil, on 8 August 1982, in Alappuzha, Kerala, to film director Fazil and his wife, Rozina. He has two sisters, Ahameda and Fatima, and a brother, Farhaan, who is also an actor.

Fahadh completed his schooling from SDV Central School Alappuzha, Lawrence School Ooty and Choice School Tripunithura. He went on to pursue his Bachelor's from SD College, Alappuzha and Masters in philosophy from University of Miami in the United States.

== Career ==
=== Debut, sabbatical and breakthrough (2002–2012) ===
Fahadh made his screen debut in 2002, with his father's Kaiyethum Doorath, opposite Nikita Thukral, under the stage name of Shaanu. The film was a failure at the box office. Regarding his performance, a critic of Sify wrote, "Shaanu oozes charm and suits the character of Sachin but he has to work hard on his dancing". Post the film's failure, Fahadh stated, "don't blame my father for my failure because it was my mistake and I came into acting without any preparation of my own." Following this Fahadh took a hiatus from acting and moved to United States for five years, where he pursued his studies. Fahadh returned to films in 2009 with Kerala Cafe, an anthology. At director Ranjith's behest, Uday Ananthan cast Fahadh in his Mrityunjayam, one of the 10 shorts in the film, where he played a journalist.

The following year in 2010, Fahadh first appeared in Pramani, which received mixed reviews. He then played a construction firm owner in Cocktail, which emerged a sleeper hit. In Tournament, Fahadh played an aspiring cricketer, in his first lead role post his debut. Critics found his performance to be "polished". Fahadh had only one film release in 2011. He played the head of a construction business, in Chaappa Kurishu opposite Remya Nambeesan. The film was a success and earned him the Kerala State Film Award for Second Best Actor along with a Filmfare Award for Best Supporting Actor – Malayalam nomination. Keerthy Ramachandran of Deccan Chronicle was appreciative of his performance.

The year 2012 marked a turning point in Fahadh's career. He first played an actor in Padmasree Bharat Dr. Saroj Kumar, which was an average grosser at the box office. In his next film, 22 Female Kottayam, Fahadh played a travel agency worker who cheats his lover opposite Rima Kallingal. The film earned him his first Filmfare Award for Best Actor – Malayalam and became a major box office success. A critic of News18 noted, "Fahadh shines as a lovable young entrepreneur in a woman oriented film, pulling off a difficult character with reasonable ease." Fahadh then played an oncologist working in Dubai in Diamond Necklace opposite Anusree. The film became another commercial success for him that year. A NDTV critic termed his performance "outstanding". In June 2012, a case was registered against Fahadh by the Kochi Town Central Police for violation of the rule against public display of images of smoking. A poster of Diamond Necklace that showed him smoking a cigarette had been on display before the Kavitha Theatre in Kochi since the film was released. His final film of the year, Friday had him play an auto rickshaw driver. The film became an average success and a critic of The Times of India found him to be "pleasing and stirring".

=== Established actor and critical acclaim (2013–2017) ===
Fahadh established himself among the leading Malayalam actors with his twelve film releases in 2013, earning commercial and critical success. Natholi Oru Cheriya Meenalla, Red Wine, 5 Sundarikal, Olipporu and D Company were average successes, while Annayum Rasoolum, Amen, Immanuel, Akam, Artist, North 24 Kaatham and Oru Indian Pranayakadha were commercial successes, ranking among the year's highest-grossing films. Fahadh first played a Muslim taxi driver in love with a Christian girl in Annayum Rasoolum, opposite Andrea Jeremiah. Anil R. Nair stated that Fahadh's super brilliant performance stands out. He next played dual characters in Natholi Oru Cheriya Meenalla opposite Kamalinee Mukherjee, which received mixed reviews. In Red Wine, he played a leftist party local secretary. Several critics praised his "excellent screen presence". Then, he played a saxophonist in love with a rich girl opposite Swathi Reddy in Amen. Critics found Fahadh "versatile" and "impactful". Fahadh played an insurance company owner in his next, Immanuel, which received positive reviews from critics. Later, in Akam, he played an architect who suspect his wife to be a yakshi, opposite Anumol. The film won him the Kerala State Film Award for Second Best Actor. A critic stated, "Fahadh has very little space to emote, yet he overpowers a much-needed deficiency to startling effect."

Following this, Fahadh played a businessman opposite Asmita Sood in the anthology film, 5 Sundarikal. A The New Indian Express critic noted that his "presence and the philosophical touch" gives the anthology an edge over others. His next film, Olipporu received mixed reviews from critics. Fahadh received the Kerala State Film Award for Best Actor for his performance in Artist and North 24 Kaatham. In Artist, he played a fine arts student opposite Ann Augustine. Paresh C Palicha noted, "Fahadh who has created a niche for himself by portraying characters with grey shades, has one more winner in this." Post this, Fahadh played an IT professional opposite Swathi Reddy in North 24 Kaatham. The film earned him another Filmfare Award for Best Actor – Malayalam and Meenakshi D Sivan of Film Companion noted: "Fahadh fits into this role brilliantly, his mouth sealed as though for eternity and his face drained of the last trace of tenderness. He redeems a flawed plot with a restraint so natural to him." After this success, he played a doctor in the segment The Day of Judgement, of the film D Company opposite Bhama. The film received mixed to positive reviews. In his last release of the year, Oru Indian Pranayakadha, Fahadh played a young politician opposite Amala Paul. A critic of Gulf News called him "versatile" and added that he was "at ease" while playing the character.

Fahadh had five film released in 2014. He first played a circle Inspector in 1 by Two, which earned mixed reviews. Fahadh next appeared as an expatriate opposite Isha Talwar in God's Own Country, which was an average grosser. Paresh C Palicha found him "stiff and unimpressive". Later in Bangalore Days, Fahadh portrayed a workaholic corporate executive opposite Nazriya Nazim. The film emerged as one of the highest grossing Malayalam films of all time and gained a cult status. Aswin J Kumar of The Times of India opined that Fahadh's performance was "strikingly intense", while Sify found him to be in "full form" in his best role of the year. It earned him another Filmfare Best Supporting Actor – Malayalam nomination. Following this, he played a former naval officer in his co-production Iyobinte Pusthakam, opposite Isha Sharvani, a box office success. Mythily Ramachandran of Gulf News termed him "brilliant" as the quiet yet determined Aloshy. Money Ratnam was his year's final release, where he played a sales manager opposite Nivetha Thomas. Pramod Thomas praised his character and noted that he carriers the film "single-handedly".

Fahadh's three releases of 2015, were average grosser at the box office – Mariyam Mukku, Haram and Ayal Njanalla. In Mariyam Mukku, he played a fisherman opposite Sana Althaf. Fahadh played a speech trainer whose wife wants a divorce, in Haram opposite Radhika Apte. Asha Prakash of The Times of India stated that he has put his heart and soul into the character. In his final film of the year Ayal Njanalla, Fahadh played a man struggling with mistaken identity opposite Mrudula Murali. Reviewer Deepa Soman stated, "The movie is watchable due to Fahad’s acting, some attempts to create refreshing comic situations, enjoyable dialogues and impressive one-liners."

In 2016, Fahadh's first release, Monsoon Mangoes failed at the box office. He played an ambitious filmmaker opposite Iswarya Menon, Cris from Deccan Chronicle found his performance "unconvincing". Fahadh then played a photographer in Maheshinte Prathikaaram, opposite Aparna Balamurali, which became a major commercial success. Deepa Gauri of Khaleej Times noted, "Fahadh's performance is top-notch. He outshines the other in his 'natural-ness' quotient." Mythily Ramachandran stated, "Fahadh, not new to playing the common man, effortlessly brings out the highs and lows of Mahesh’s life." His performance earned him his third Filmfare Best Actor – Malayalam nomination.

In 2017, Fahadh appeared in four films, Role Models, Take Off, Thondimuthalum Driksakshiyum and Velaikkaran, of which the latter three were major commercial successes. In Take Off, Fahadh played an IFS officer in Iraq. Sowmya Rajendran stated that his soulful eyes and understated performance complemented the storytelling. His next film, Role Models opposite Namitha Pramod garned mixed reviews. Fahadh then played a thief in Thondimuthalum Driksakshiyum, one of his career's most notable role, which won him the National Film Award for Best Supporting Actor and his third Filmfare Award for Best Actor – Malayalam. Sethumadhavan N of Bangalore Mirror wrote: "Fahadh plays second fiddle comfortably for the first half of the film. It takes a lot of guts and confidence for a popular star like him to take on such an unconventional role." Anna MM Vetticad opined that he is a picture in "understated hilarity". Fahadh ventured into Tamil films with Velaikkaran, where he played a businessman. In his review, Haricharan Pudipeddi opined that Fahadh gets to "steal the thunder" in the second half, in a confident debut.

=== Stardom and experimentation of genres (2018–2023) ===
Fahadh had three critical and commercial success in 2018 with Carbon, Varathan and Njan Prakashan. Carbon had him play a youngster in search of a goal in life opposite Mamta Mohandas. Baradwaj Rangan found his performance to be "extraordinary empathetic". He then played a married man in trouble opposite Aishwarya Lekshmi, in Varathan, which he co-produced with his wife. Sajin Shrijith stated, "Amal gives Fahadh a full-fledged mass avatar befitting his personality." Fahadh played a male nurse in one of the highest-grossing Malayalam films, Njan Prakashan, his final release of the year. A critic of Sify praised his "dedicated performance" but criticised the character.

Fahadh portrayed Shammi, a male chauvinist in Kumbalangi Nights, his first release of 2019 which he co-produced with Nazriya. The film grossed more than ₹ 39 crore at the box office. His character and the film has gained a cult following. Sarath Ramesh Kuniyl was appreciative of his ability to brilliantly slip into "such mind-blowing characters". Sreehari Nair of Rediff.com opined that Fahadh played Shammi's rigidity by "acting from his neck up". The film won him Kerala State Film Award for Best Character Actor. He then played a psychiatrist opposite Sai Pallavi in Athiran, which received mixed reviews but performed well at box office. Reviewer of Deccan Chronicle found him to be "effortless". Fahad next played a struggling actor, whose wife cheats on him in Super Deluxe opposite Samantha Ruth Prabhu. The film received critical acclaim with Karthik Kumar of Hindustan Times stating that he shine like never before.

Trance and C U Soon were the two releases Fahadh had in 2020. In Trance, he played an atheist motivational speaker opposite Nazriya Nazim. Goutham V. S. noted: "Fahadh steals the limelight by portraying a character that is hysteric and disturbing at the same time". His film, C U Soon became India's first computer screen film and saw him playing a cyber security specialist alongside Darshana Rajendran. Saibal Chatterjee stated, "Fahadh derives strength and thrives on his emphasis on exactitude of expression."

Fahadh played a serial killer in his first release of 2021, Irul. Despite the mixed reviews, Fahadh's performance was well received by Shubhra Gupta. Post this, Fahadh played the titular engineering dropout in Joji. Anupama Chopra termed Fahadh "stunning" and added that he delivers a performance within a performance. Nearly a week after the release of Joji, reports came out that the Film Exhibitors United Organisation of Kerala (FEUOK) has warned Fahadh against acting in movies made for streaming through OTT platforms, which later turned out to be a rumour. Fahadh then earned nationwide recognition with Malik, where he played a revolutionary leader opposite Nimisha Sajayan. Several critics termed it his career best performance, while Ramya Palisetty appreciated him for portraying a flawed character with "brilliance", Roktim Rajpal stated that he leaves an "impact with his intensity". It earned him his fifth Filmfare Best Actor – Malayalam nomination. Later, Fahadh expanded to Telugu films with Pushpa: The Rise, where he played a cruel police officer. Nishad Thaivalappil of News18 stated: "Fahadh Faasil’s entry towards the end only elevates the whole film. His entry, dialogues and punch lines are surely impactful." The film became one of the highest-grossing Telugu films of all time.

In his first release of 2022, Fahadh played the head of black-ops squad in Vikram opposite Gayathrie. The film eventually emerged as one of the highest-grossing Tamil and Indian film of all time. Soundarya Athimuthu of The Quint felt that Fahadh "steals the show" with an all round performance. Haricharan Pudipeddi stated, "Fahadh gets the second most meaty part among the ensemble cast; and he’s terrific." Fahadh's next release, Malayankunju alongside Rajisha Vijayan saw him play an electronics technician. Divya Nair of Rediff.com noted, "Malayankunju triumphs in the integrity and ease of FaFa's portrayal of Anikuttan, with layered expressions and emotions."

Fahadh had three film releases in 2023 – He first appeared as a pharmacist in Pachuvum Athbutha Vilakkum, which was a commercial success. G. Ragesh of Onmanorama opined that he has played similar characters before but added: "the virtues and vulnerabilities of Pachu are safe with the actor in Fahadh". In his next film, Dhoomam, he appeared opposite Aparna Balamurali as a tobacco company head. The film received mixed reviews with Anna M. M. Vetticad calling his character arc "weak". In his final film of the year, Fahadh played a district secretary in Maamannan. Bharathy Singaravel of The News Minute noted: "Fahadh as the primary antagonist, offers a blood curdling performance. His villainy is shrewd, calculated, and completely believable." The film emerged as a major commercial success and won him the Filmfare Award for Best Supporting Actor – Tamil.

=== Commercial success and fluctuations (2024–present) ===
In his first film of 2024, Fahadh played a kind-hearted Malayali-Kannadiga gangster in Aavesham, which he also co-produced. The film eventually became the sixth highest grossing Malayalam film of all time and earned him wider recognition. Janani K from India Today opined that he "wonderfully portrayed" the dynamic character, while Nirmal Jovial of The Week stated that he "brings out his complete form" only in those climax portions. Fahadh then appeared in the anthology series Manorathangal, playing a Malayali immigrant. Arjun Menon of Rediff.com found him to be "perfectly cast" as the passive yet cipher-like figure. Following this, Fahadh played Patrick, a former thief turned police informer in Vettaiyan. Bhuvanesh Chandar of The Hindu found him to be "impressive" and was appreciative of his comic timing. Despite being a box office failure, it became the third highest grossing Tamil film of the year. Some commentators bemoaned that Fahadh should take on less supporting parts, owing to his success as a lead actor. After this, he played an IPS officer in Bougainvillea. Anandu Suresh called his character "underdeveloped" but added, "Fahadh demonstrates his ability to rise above such limitations in scripts, shining through with his commanding presence." It was a moderate success at the box office. In his year's last release, Fahadh reprised his role of a police officer in the sequel Pushpa 2: The Rule. Taking note of his versatility, Devesh Sharma of Filmfare stated, "As a talented actor, he inject a comic touch into his character even in the midst of serious scenes, without diminishing their impact." The film broke several records emerging as one of the highest grossing Telugu and Indian film of all time.

Fahadh started 2025 with Maareesan, where he played a thief on a road trip with an alzheimer patient (played by Vadivelu). The Hollywood Reporter India's Prathyush Parasuraman noted, "Fahadh—who even gets his ‘FaFa’ theme song— is an actor whose presence on screen allows him to conjure whole worlds into words. He has comfortably slipped into the skin of his character." Despite positive reviews, it underperformed commercially. His next film Odum Kuthira Chaadum Kuthira, saw him play a man jilted at his wedding by his lover, opposite Kalyani Priyadarshan. Janani K opined that Fahadh leaves "little impact" due to a weak story. It initially became a box office failure, but later gained success following its release over Netflix.

In 2026, Fahadh portrayed an entrepreneur owning a surveillance app in the multi-starrer Patriot. Anandu Suresh of The Indian Express stated, "Fahadh's brilliant performance overcomes poor writing, keeping the antagonist menacing". Despite being the fifth highest grossing Malayalam film of the year, it was a box office bomb. Following a cameo appearance in Idhayam Murali, Fahadh portrayed an orphan con artist and magician in Don't Trouble the Trouble. The film marked his first Telugu film as a lead, and he also dubbed for his role. Despite negative review for the film, Yashaswini Sri called him film's "best thing" and stated, "Fahadh is sincere, committed and technically impressive, particularly given that he is performing entirely in Telugu, a language he does not think in." The film failed at the box office.

Fahadh will next appear in the Telugu film Oxygen, and the Malayalam films: Karate Chandran, and Torpedo.

== Personal life ==
Fahadh met actress Nazriya Nazim on the sets of their film Bangalore Days, in 2013 and they eventually began dating. Following a year courtship, the couple got engaged on 20 January 2014. Fahadh married Nazriya on 21 August 2014, in Thiruvananthapuram.

In 2024, Fahadh revealed that he has been diagnosed with ADHD.

== Other work and public image ==
Fahadh supports various causes and charitable organisations. During the COVID-19 pandemic, he donated a sum of ₹10 lakhs for FEFKA (Film Employees Federation of Kerala) workers. In 2024, Fahadh and his wife, Nazriya contributed ₹25 lakhs for the relief work of Wayanad landslides. Fahadh is a celebrity endorser for brands and products such as Titan, Milma, Jos Alukkas, Adithi Aatta, UAE Exchange, Estilocus, Camerry and Merricrem Icecreams.

In the Kochi Times Most Desirable Men list, Fahadh was placed in 5th in 2017, 2nd in 2018, 7th in 2019 and 8th in 2020. In 2019 and 2022, the Indian edition of GQ featured Fahadh among the nation's most influential young people and credited him for "choosing scripts with an edge, and pouring himself into his parts with conviction". Fahadh was named the Men of the Year by Man's World in 2020. In 2024, Mashable India and Hindustan Times placed him in their "Top Performances of the Year" list. Fahadh was placed 12th in Eastern Eye's Top 50 Asian Stars of 2024. He has also appeared on the cover of several magazines including Vanitha. A research study conducted in 2023 by Indian Institute of Human Brands (IIHB) stated that Fahadh was the highest-ranked celebrity in Malayalam cinema. The study was based on several attributes covering image, personality and other human factors. In 2024, Fahadh was placed 81st on IMDb's List of 100 Most Viewed Indian Stars.

== Acting style and reception ==
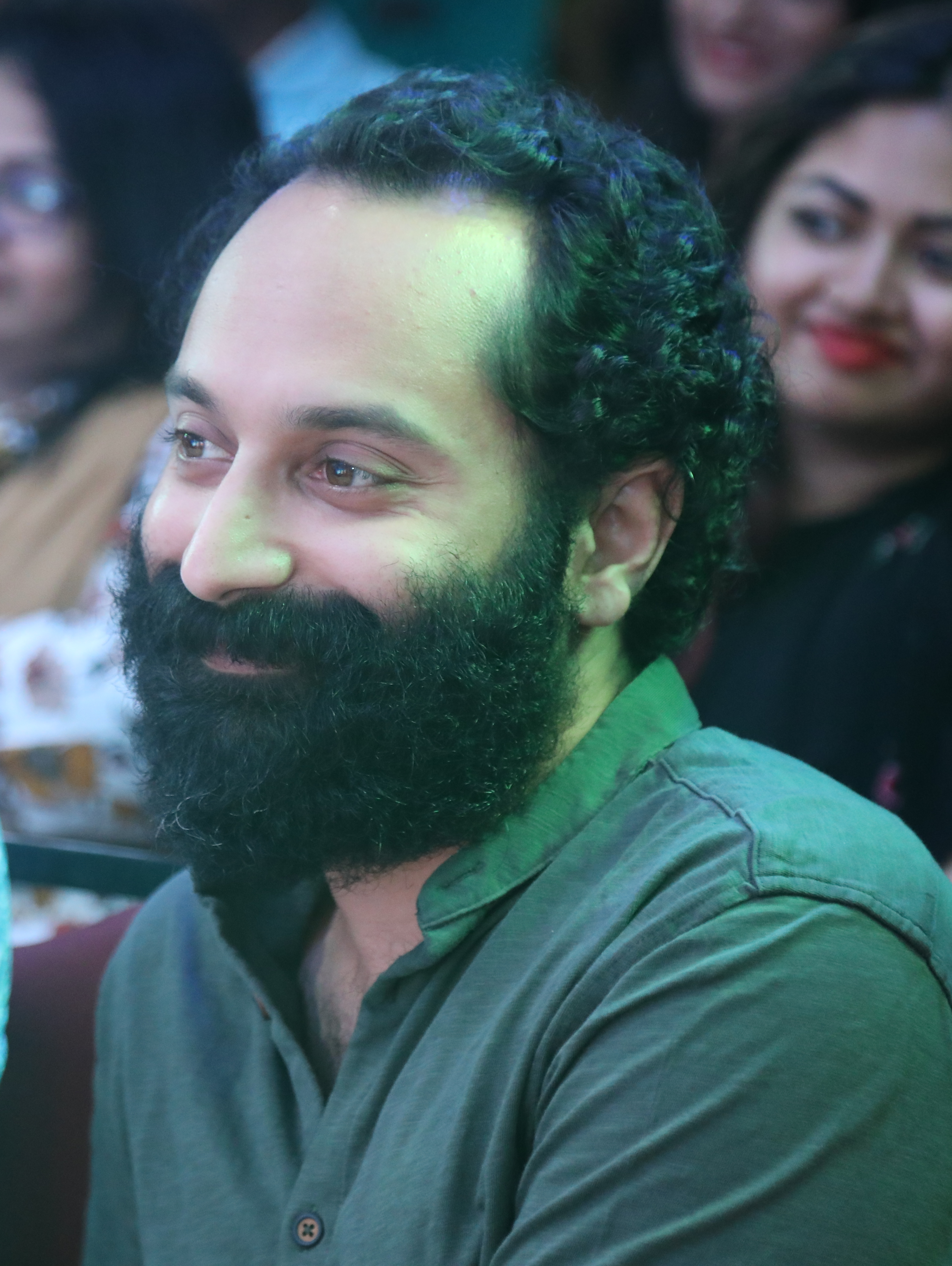
Fahadh at an event in 2018

Fahadh is considered among the most popular and highest-paid actors of Malayalam cinema, according to various media reports. Fahadh is noted for playing a variety of roles in a variety of genres. Princy Alexander of Onmanorama called him a "force to reckon with". Writing for The News Minute, Fahir Maithutty called him a front-runner of the New Generation Wave and said, "Fahadh possesses traits that set him apart as an actor — his command over dialects and his ability to transform to any character."

Anandu Suresh of The Indian Express talked about his career comeback and noted, "The new Fahadh displayed remarkable growth and maturity. His second innings made him one of contemporary Indian cinema’s finest actors." Neelima Menon of HuffPost stated, "Most of his notable films are character-driven and many of his characters have been flawed, vulnerable heroes. He is a product of new-age Malayalam cinema, where superstardom has begun to wane, and alpha male heroes have been exiled. Film critic Aparna Prashanthi opined: "He is an actor in the purest sense. He isn’t addicted to stardom nor is he particular about drawing all the attention to himself in a film. He just wants to be part of good cinema." Deepak Joy of The Week called him "an accomplished actor" and added, "Fahadh is a natural actor like no other. It is said that even his eyes acts before the camera. While stars make fans, Fahadh command a devoted audience." Nidhima Taneja of The Print took note of his versatility and added, "Fahadh Faasil won’t play your garden-variety hero. He’s bending the norms, creating his own multiverse and getting pan-Indian acclaim."

In a 2018 interview, Fahadh talked about the audience response to his films and said,

"I sincerely want people to watch my films. And that is enough for me. After that, they don't have to think about me. They don't have to be concerned about me. Let them watch it if it is a good film. If it is not, they don't have to."

Rediff.com named Fahad the "Best Malayalam Actor" of 2012 and 2013. His performance in Maheshinte Prathikaram and Thondimuthalum Driksakshiyum is regarded as one of the "100 Greatest Performances of the Decade" by Film Companion. Several members of the Indian film industry have appreciated Fahadh's acting style. Actor Rajkummar Rao expressed his desire to work with him, calling Fahadh "one of the finest actors in the country". Actress Vidya Balan, Alia Bhatt and actor Suriya have praised his films, and called him a "fantastic actor". Actor Ayushmann Khurrana said, "I am a big Fahadh Faasil fan and if given a chance, I would love to work with him because the kind of cinema he works in resonates with what I do in Hindi cinema." Director Pawan Kumar, who worked with him in Dhoomam said, "Fahadh Faasil does not have any baggage of a star. His filmography has been very diverse and he does not have to cater to any kind of genre, which is what he likes."

== Accolades ==
Fahadh has won four Filmfare Awards — Best Actor – Malayalam for his performance in 22 Female Kottayam (2012), North 24 Kaatham (2013) and Thondimuthalum Driksakshiyum (2017) and Best Supporting Actor – Tamil for Maamannan (2023). Thondimuthalum Driksakshiyum also won him the National Film Award for Best Supporting Actor. Additionally, he has also earned four Kerala State Film Awards — Second Best Actor for Chaappa Kurishu and Akam (both 2011), Best Actor for Artist and North 24 Kaatham (both 2013), Best Character Actor and Best Film with Popular Appeal and Aesthetic Value for Kumbalangi Nights (2020).

== See also ==
- New Generation Films
- List of Malayalam film actors
