= Kerala State Film Award for Best Character Actor =

Annual Indian film award

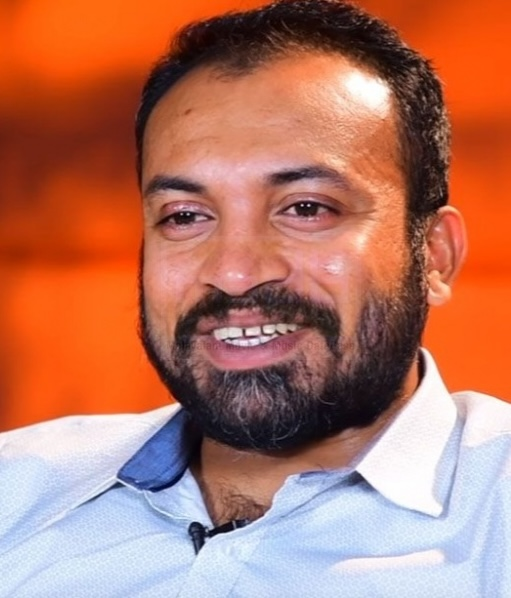
- Soubin Shahir, recent winner at the 55th Kerala State Film Awards
- Awarded for: Best performance by an actor in a Malayalam film
- Sponsored by: Kerala State Chalachitra Academy
- Reward: ₹50,000 (US$530)
- First award: 2015
- Final award: 2024
- Most recent winner: Soubin Shahir, Siddharth Bharathan

Highlights
- Total awarded: 9
- First winner: Prem Prakash

The Kerala State Film Award for Best Character Actor is an award, begun in 2015, presented annually at the Kerala State Film Awards of India to an actor for his performance in a Malayalam film. It replaced the Kerala State Film Award for Second Best Actor, which was discontinued in 2014. The winner receives a certificate, a statuette and a cash prize of ₹50,000.

== Winners ==
Year	Actor	Film	Ref.
2015	Prem Prakash	Nirnayakam	
2016	Manikandan R. Achari	Kammatipaadam	
2017	Alencier Ley Lopez	Thondimuthalum Driksakshiyum	
2018	Joju George	Joseph; Chola	
2019	Fahadh Faasil	Kumbalangi Nights	
2020	Sudheesh	Ennivar; Bhoomiyile Manohara Swakaryam	
2021	Moor	Kala	
2022	P.P. Kunhikrishnan	Nna Thaan Case Kodu	
2023	Vijayaraghavan	Pookkaalam	
2024	Soubin Shahir, Siddharth Bharathan	Manjummel Boys, Bramayugam	

== See also ==
- Kerala State Film Award for Best Character Actress
