= Chaappa Kurishu =

- Theatrical Poster
- Directed by: Sameer Thahir
- Screenplay by: Sameer Thahir; Unni R.
- Story by: Sameer Thahir
- Produced by: Listin Stephen
- Starring: Fahadh Faasil; Vineeth Sreenivasan
- Cinematography: Jomon T. John
- Edited by: Don Max
- Music by: Rex Vijayan
- Production company: Magic Frames
- Distributed by: Central Pictures
- Release date: 15 July 2011
- Running time: 130 minutes
- Country: India
- Language: Malayalam

Chaappa Kurishu (transl. Heads or Tails) is a 2011 Indian Malayalam-language thriller film co-written and directed by Sameer Thahir (in his directorial debut). The film stars Fahadh Faasil, Vineeth Sreenivasan, Roma Asrani, Remya Nambeesan, and Nivetha Thomas in the lead roles.

The production started in April 2011 at Kochi and the film was released on 14 July. It is the directorial debut of Sameer Thahir. The entire movie was shot on a Canon 7D Still Camera. The film was remade in Tamil as Pulivaal with Vimal and Prasanna.

The film is an unauthorized remake of the 2009 South Korean film Handphone, along with its reported structural similarity to the 2002 American film Changing Lanes.

== Plot ==
Arjun, a wealthy builder who owns a big construction business in Kochi, is having an illicit affair with his subordinate, Sonia, even though he is preparing to be engaged to his family friend's daughter, Ann. Ansari, a poor supermarket worker frequently mocked for his appearance, is crushing on his co-worker Nafiza.

Arjun is shown to be regretful of having taken advantage of Sonia's trust in him when she allowed him to record them.When Arjun and Sonia met in Arjun's flat, Arjun recorded them having sex on his mobile without Sonia knowing. Sonia too finds out about the leaked video, and after making a call to Arjun, is shown to be preparing for suicide.

A chase follows when Arjun tries to find Ansari. The confrontation between the two is vicious and bloody before finally settling down and resignedly going their separate ways. Sonia decides to leave town instead of killing herself. Arjun finds out and is seen seeking her out at the airport. He is all bruised from the fight, and the film leaves them at that point and ends with Ansari standing up to people who mock him.

== Cast ==
- Fahadh Faasil as Arjun Samuel
- Vineeth Sreenivasan as Ansari
- Roma Asrani as Ann
- Remya Nambeesan as Sonia
- Nivetha Thomas as Nafiza
- Jinu Joseph as John
- Sunil Sukhada as Store Manager Martin
- Dinesh Panicker as Samuel

== Production ==
=== Title ===
"Chappa Kurishu" means Head or Tail in Malayalam. Sameer Thahir chose the title based on the two male leads, saying "I knew that they were the two sides of the same coin." He chose the colloquial term used in Kochi, owing to his own locality.

=== Filming ===
Chappa Kurishu was launched by actor Kamal Haasan at the 100th day function of Traffic. The film was produced by Listin Stephen who also produced Traffic. It was director Anwar Rasheed who introduced Sameer Thahir to Listin. The film started production in April 2011 at Ernakulam. The film was shot entirely with a Canon 7D DSLR camera.

== Reception ==
Keerthy Ramachandran of Deccan Chronicle gave the film a rating of 2 out of 5 stars saying "The film is a dark riveting account of the lives of two men who lead extremely contrasting lives." Veeyen of nowrunning.com rated the film 2.5/5 and said "It's a brave and genuinely heartfelt directorial effort from a young director, who has clearly won the toss this time around." Rediff.com gave the film a score of 2.5 out of 5 saying "Chaappa Kurishu, Samir Thahir's debut as a director holds promise but leaves us with a feeling that it could have been better." Sify on its review said that "Chappa Kurishu shocks the viewers for sure, but sadly for all the wrong reasons." Indiaglitz rated the film 5/10 and wrote: "The generous dose of skin show sequence, violent action and the need for a more tighter scripts will tell on its business and restrict its appeal further to limited audiences."

== Soundtrack ==
Chaappa Kurishu

Soundtrack album by Rex Vijayan
- Released: 11 July 2011
- Genre: Feature film soundtrack
- Length: 9:02
- Label: Satyam Audios
- Producer: Rex Vijayan

Rex Vijayan chronology
Kerala Cafe (Segment:Bridge) (2009)	Chaappa Kurishu (2011)	22 Female Kottayam (2012)

The music of the film was composed by Rex Vijayan with lyrics penned by Engandiyur Chandrasekharan.

Chaappa Kurishu original motion picture soundtrack
No.	Title	Artist(s)	Length
1.	"Oru Naalum Kaanathe"	Resmi Sateesh, Rex Vijayan	4:09
2.	"Theeye Theeye"	Sayanora Philip, Saju Sreenivas	4:53

== Awards ==
Award	Category	Result	Recipient	Ref.
Kerala State Film Awards 2011	Second Best Actor	Won	Fahadh Faasil	
Ramu Kariat Memorial Cultural Forum Awards	Best Second Film	Won	Chaappa Kurish	
Film Guidance Society of Kerala Film Awards	Best Supporting Actress	Won	Remya Nambeesan	
Vayalar Ramavarma Chalachitra Television Award	Best Actress	Won	Remya Nambeesan	
Asianet Film Awards	Best Character Actress	Nominated	Remya Nambeesan	
Asiavision Movie Awards	Trendsetter Award	Won	Listin Stephen	
Vanitha Film Awards	Best Supporting Actress	Won	Remya Nambeesan	
Mathrubhumi Kalyan Silks Film Awards	Best Path Breaking Movie of the Year	Nominated	Chaappa Kurish	
Amrita Film Awards	Best Film	Won	Chaappa Kurish	
Kochi Times Film Awards	Best Youth Film	Won	Chaappa Kurish	
