= Iyobinte Pusthakam =

2014 film by Amal Neerad

- Theatrical release poster
- Directed by: Amal Neerad
- Written by: Gopan Chithambaram
- Dialogues by: Syam Pushkaran; Gopan Chithambaram
- Produced by: Amal Neerad; Fahadh Faasil
- Starring: Fahadh Faasil; Lal; Jayasurya; Isha Sharvani
- Narrated by: T. G. Ravi
- Cinematography: Amal Neerad
- Edited by: Praveen Prabhakar
- Music by: Yakzan-Neha
- Production companies: Amal Neerad Productions; Fahadh Faasil and Friends
- Distributed by: August Cinema; A & A Release
- Release date: 7 November 2014 (India)
- Running time: 160 minutes
- Country: India
- Language: Malayalam

Iyobinte Pusthakam (transl. Book of Job) is a 2014 Indian Malayalam-language period action thriller film directed by Amal Neerad and written by Gopan Chithambaran, with dialogues written by Syam Pushkaran. The film stars Fahadh Faasil, Lal, Jayasurya and Isha Sharvani with Jinu Joseph, Chemban Vinod Jose, Vinayakan and Padmapriya in supporting roles. Aashiq Abu makes a cameo appearance as P. J. Antony.

The film is a period drama set in the mid-20th century in Munnar, Western Ghats. It follows the life of a ruthless businessman named Iyob and the sibling rivalry among his sons Aloshy, Ivan and Dimitri, who are named after the characters from Fyodor Dostoyevsky's The Brothers Karamazov.

Principal photography commenced in March 2014 at Vagamon in Idukki Kerala, India. Iyobinte Pusthakam was released on 7 November 2014. The film was highly critically acclaimed and was a box-office success. It received five Kerala State Film Awards and three Kerala Film Critics Association Awards.

== Plot ==
The film starts with the message "The aged aren't always wise, nor do the elderly always understand justice" (Job 32:9). The story is narrated by a communist leader, and is set in 1900 in Munnar during the British Raj. Harrison is a British businessman who comes to Munnar to cultivate tea. He finds an able boy amidst his workers and names him 'Iyob'. Harrison holds Iyob close and helps him marry Annamma. Harrison's wife leaves him and returns to England; later he sees Kazhali and becomes interested in her. When Harrison finds out Kazhali's relation with Thacho, one of his servants, he orders Iyob to kill Thacho. Iyob corners Thacho and is about to kill him when Thacho jumps off the cliff and dies. Afterwards, Harrison takes Kazhali as his mistress and she becomes pregnant. During the First World War, Harrison's business is affected and he leaves for Britain but dies on the way to Cochin, not even setting sail. Knowing this, Iyob throws Kazhali out of the house, simultaneously beating her, and takes over all assets of Harrison by using the power of attorney given by Harrison.

Annamma, without her husband's knowledge, meets Kazhali, who now has a daughter, Martha, regularly talking with her, and she also takes her youngest son, Aloshy. Aloshy and Martha become good friends and fall in love right from their childhood. However, Annamma falls ill and dies. She is greatly mourned by all, including Kazhali and her daughter, Martha; both look on the funeral from afar.

Iyob has three sons Dimitri, Ivan and Aloshy. Dimitri and Ivan are ruthless like Iyob whereas Aloshy is kind and compassionate like his mother. His two closest friends are Chemban and Martha. Chemban's parents are killed in their house by a fire set by Aloshy's family because of their illness. Aloshy leaves the house as a child after seeing his brothers rape and kill a girl who was a servant there. He runs away to Cochin and stays there. After some years Aloshy joins the Royal Indian Navy as an officer where he took part in many battles. After the Royal Indian Navy mutiny of 1946 he returns to his father and brothers in Munnar, but is upset by the wrongdoings of his father and brothers. He reunites with both Martha and Chemban, rescuing the latter and his wife from a beating by his brothers' henchmen. Chemban and his family leave to be safe. Martha and Aloshy become close again after they escape from a rampaging elephant. They fall in love.

Iyob finds out Aloshy was dismissed from the navy because he defected and became a part of the Indian independence movement. In a fit of anger, he orders Aloshy to leave. Aloshy meets Martha and says he will come back for her. He leaves for Cochin, but on his way he is attacked by Dimitri and Ivan who try to kill him, but Aloshy survives and is found by his childhood friend Chemban. At this time Iyob's health deteriorates and his sons overpower him making pacts with Angoor Rowther, a rich Tamil merchant despite opposition by Iyob. Dimitri and Ivan find out Aloshy is alive with Martha. They try multiple attempts to kill him, but Aloshy defeats them and kills their henchmen, thereby making their attempts fail.

One night, Ivan went to Dimitri's room for blocking him from beating his wife Rahel. In a fit of anger, Dimitri asks Ivan why has he entered his room without his permission. Then he understood that Ivan had spent nights with Rahel in his absence. Rahel then hits Dimitri on his head with a metallic flower vase. Ivan kills Dimitri with the vase after taking it from Rahel. This is witnessed by Iyob, who realises everyone has been cheating him. It is revealed that Rahel is daughter of Thacho whom Iyob killed and she is taking revenge using Ivan. She also tries to kill him by poisoning his food.

Iyob escapes from home and ends up under Aloshy's shelter. Iyob reveals that all the assets of Harrison belongs to Kazhali and he was cheating them the whole time. Aloshy is arrested by the police but is liberated by the narrator who was against Ivan and Angoor. Aloshy then cuts off the policeman's finger. Ivan knowing that all the assets will be lost, decides to kill Aloshy, but he despises Rahel when he come to know about her real intention. Rahel makes a deal with Angoor to kill everyone in his way including Ivan and all the assets and Rahel will be his. Iyob and Martha try to escape through the forest, but Iyob is shot down by Angoor. Aloshy finds Martha sinking into a swamp and tries to help her. Ivan and Angoor come towards them, when Angoor tries to shoot Ivan he runs out of bullets and Aloshy stabs Angoor with a ramrod and Ivan shoots Angoor's associate, when Ivan tries to kill Aloshy he is killed by Chemban and Aloshy kills Angoor. Declaring her independence, Rahel commits suicide by shooting. Afterwards, Aloshy and Martha leaves Munnar.

At the end of the film the narrator is arrested by the police as it was the time when The Emergency was declared in India by Prime Minister Indira Gandhi and all the communist leaders were taken into preventive custody. He remarks that people like Aloshy would make the life of people much prosperous than it is now.

== Cast ==
- Fahadh Faasil as Aloshy Gomber, former Royal Indian Navy officer
  - Shebin Benson as teenager Aloshy
    - Nebish Benson as young Aloshy
- Lal as Iyob
  - Vishnu Unnikrishnan as young Iyob
- Jayasurya as Angoor Rawther
- Isha Sharvani as Martha
- Jinu Joseph as Ivan
  - David John as young Ivan
- Chemban Vinod Jose as Dimitri
  - Vishnu Govindan as young Dimitri
- Vinayakan as Chemban
  - Chethan Jayalal as young Chemban
- Padmapriya as Rahel
- John Vijay as Ganapathy Iyer
- Lena as Kazhali
- TG Ravi as The Communist Leader
  - Sreejith Ravi as The Communist Leader (Younger)
- Sal Yusuf as Harrison
- Rita Mathen as Harrison's first wife
- Soubin Shahir as Narayana, Ivan's henchman
- Amith Chakalakkal as Nizam Rawther, Angoor's brother
- Pauly Valsan as Thresya
- Dileesh Pothan as Paily, Tea Shop Owner
- Saritha Sunil as Cheeru
- Hima Shankar as Migrant
- Surjith Gopinath as Laser
- Professor Aliyar as office comrade
- Anil Murali as Mathuppilla Police
- Amala Paul as a Tribal Dancer (Cameo appearance)
- Reenu Mathews as Annamma, Aloshy, Ivan and Dimitri's mother and Iyob's wife (guest appearance)
- Aashiq Abu as P. J. Antony, former Royal Indian Navy officer and Aloshy's close friend (Cameo appearance)

== Critical reception ==
Iyobinte Pusthakam received positive reviews from the critics and audiences alike where direction, cinematography, colour grading, cast performances (especially Fahadh Faasil, Lal and Jayasurya), musical score and story received praise.

== Soundtrack ==
Iyobinte Pusthakam

Soundtrack album by Yakzan Gary Pereira & Neha Nair
- Released: 24 October 2014
- Recorded: 2014
- Genre: Feature film soundtrack
- Length: 23:15
- Label: Muzik 247
- Producer: Yakzan Gary Pereira

Iyobinte Pusthakam
No.	Title	Lyrics	Artist	Length
1.	"Maane"	Rafeeq Ahammed	Anil Ram, Neha S. Nair	5:24
2.	"Raave"	Rafeeq Ahammed	Haricharan, Neha S. Nair	4:33
3.	"Theeyattam"	Rafeeq Ahammed	Amala C, Walid Bensalim	4:34
4.	"Aloshy (Theme Music)"		Neha S. Nair	2:47
5.	"Angoor Ravuther (Theme Music)"		Neha S. Nair	1:13
6.	"Chemban (Theme Music)"		Neha S. Nair	1:15
7.	"Iyobinte Pusthakam (Theme Music)"	Vinayak Sasikumar	Neha S. Nair	1:07
8.	"Marthas (Theme Music)"		Neha S. Nair	1:00
9.	"Rahels (Theme Music)"		Usha Uthup	1:22
Total length:				23:15

== Accolades ==
2014 Kerala State Film Awards

- Best Cinematography: Amal Neerad
- Best Makeup Artist: Manoj Angamali
- Best Sound Design: Thapas Nayak
- Special Jury Mention: Yakzan Gary Pereira & Neha Nair (music direction)

2014 Kerala Film Critics Association Awards

- Best Film: Iyobinte Pusthakam
- Best Director: Amal Neerad
- Best Cinematographer: Amal Neerad
- Kerala State Film Award for Best Costume Designer: Sameera Saneesh

2016 Indian International Film Awards Utsavam

- Best Performance in a Negative Role: Jayasurya

Asianet Film Awards

- Best Film: Amal Neerad, Fahadh Faasil
