= Joji (film) =

2021 Indian film

- Official release poster
- Directed by: Dileesh Pothan
- Written by: Syam Pushkaran
- Based on: Macbeth by William Shakespeare
- Produced by: Fahadh Faasil; Dileesh Pothan; Syam Pushkaran
- Starring: Fahadh Faasil
- Cinematography: Shyju Khalid
- Edited by: Kiran Das
- Music by: Justin Varghese
- Production companies: Bhavana Studios; Working Class Hero; Fahadh Faasil and Friends
- Distributed by: Amazon Prime Video
- Release date: 7 April 2021
- Running time: 113 minutes
- Country: India
- Language: Malayalam

Joji, or stylized as JOJI, is a 2021 Indian Malayalam-language crime drama film directed by Dileesh Pothan and written by Syam Pushkaran. The story is inspired by William Shakespeare's play Macbeth. The film was produced by Bhavana Studios in association with Working Class Hero, and Fahadh Faasil and Friends. Fahadh Faasil plays the title character, while Baburaj, Shammi Thilakan, and Unnimaya Prasad play other pivotal roles. The plot revolves around a wealthy family of three sons and a father living in the countryside of Kerala.

Principal photography took place from November 2020 to January 2021, shot extensively in Kottayam. Joji released through the OTT service Amazon Prime Video on 7 April 2021 to widespread critical acclaim.

== Plot ==
Joji, an engineering dropout, along with his elder brothers Jomon and Jaison, leads a life of fear under their dominating father, Kuttappan. The family also includes Jaison's wife, Bincy, and Jomon's teenage son, Popy. They live in a vast house in the middle of a sizable plantation in the high ranges of COVID-ridden Kerala. While Joji looks meek compared to his father and brothers, he appears to share a bond with Bincy and Popy.

Despite being 74, Kuttappan is well-built and very much in charge of family affairs. Jomon, a divorcee, aids him in agriculture on their vast estate, while Jaison manages their businesses in town. Joji runs unsuccessful ventures, the remains of which are a horse tied in their estate. He is financially dependent on Kuttappan, who physically abuses Joji. Bincy manages the household chores and is always shown to be occupied in the kitchen. A pond is maintained in the family yard by workers, including Gireesh and Sudhi. Kuttappan manages to pull out a heavy valve stuck in the mud as nobody else could handle it, but suffers a stroke in the process and is hospitalized. A close relative of the family, Dr. Felix, discusses with his fellow doctors and concludes that Kuttappan is paralyzed and there is little hope of improvement in his condition. Things look brighter even for Joji as he manages to sell his horse after showing it off to buyers in the family's yard.

However, Kuttappan returns home, bedridden and unable to speak. Jomon is visibly upset over his father's condition, while the others, at various levels, hope for Kuttappan's speedy death. Joji even visits his father in bed and mocks his paralyzed hand, which was used to abuse him. When Kuttappan shows further physical suffering, Jomon decides to sanction a risky surgery, which is fortunately successful. This brings a recovering Kuttappan back home, albeit in a wheelchair, getting everyone in the house back to their old ways.

As prompted by Bincy, Jaison asks his father for money to buy a new house in town but is rejected and ridiculed by Kuttappan. Kuttappan also manages to use a pen to sign a cheque, indicating his improved condition. An upset Bincy shares her frustration with Joji. Joji decides to stand up to his father and demands that he step down. However, the old man manages to choke Joji with his able left hand and ridicules him as well. Joji decides to kill his father Kuttappan and begins to secretly replace Kuttappan's daily medication with similar-looking pills. Bincy witnesses this but conceals the truth as she and Jaison also secretly wish for Kuttappan's death. Joji's plan works, and Kuttappan dies soon.

Jomon, already an alcoholic, sets off firecrackers at the funeral procession, claiming his father would not have wanted a depressing funeral. This leads the family into a scuffle with the church priest, Father Kevin. Not long after the funeral, the family meets, presided over by Dr. Felix, to partition the dead man's estate. Jomon objects to the partition, saying it would be disrespectful to Kuttappan's spirit. Jomon and Jaison enter into a heated argument. Joji rises to the occasion and proposes a solution that both his brothers agree to, impressing everyone.

Meanwhile, rumors begin to spread about Kuttappan's death. Joji has nightmares of his father and tries to destroy the evidence by burning all the medicine strips that were used in the gruesome act. But this leads to a fire near the pond. Jomon notices the sign of the fire the next morning. Joji manages to escape and lies to Jomon that he doesn't visit the pond at all. Jomon is upset over rumors about Kuttappan's death and is suspicious that someone in the family is behind it. Jomon wants to confront Thotta Sudhi, who was loud about Joji's apathetic walking toward the house as Bincy was crying out when Kuttappan died. Joji joins Jomon in searching for Sudhi in the plantations. They find Sudhi working alone on the plantation, making thotta (a crude explosive used in breaking stones). When confronted, he runs away after a heated exchange with the brothers, but not before spilling some beans which makes Jomon suspect Joji. Realizing Joji is hiding something, Jomon attacks him, and Joji subdues him using Popy's air gun, after which he throws Sudhi's explosives at him, killing Jomon instantly. Joji provides a statement to the police, framing Sudhi for Jomon's death.

Over the next few days, Jaison notices weird changes in Joji's behavior, including him becoming overtly religious, as Bincy begins to question the possibility of Joji's involvement in Jomon's murder as well. During the autopsy, the police find the pellets from the gun in Jomon's body, and Popy realizes that Joji was the only other person who knew of the gun, which was purchased with money stolen from Kuttappan. The family confronts Joji, who continues to deny these claims. Realizing that he will not get away, Joji tries to blackmail Jaison, stating that unless he stands with Joji, he will be implicated as a co-conspirator in the murders. Realizing the true colors of Joji, Jaison categorically refuses this. Bincy confesses to Jaison that she knew about some of Joji's acts. Having no way out, Joji attempts suicide by shooting himself in the head with the air gun. He also sends a suicide note to the remaining family members blaming society for all his acts.

In the mid-credits scene, it is shown that Joji survives and awakens in the hospital, paralyzed. When the police officer asks a bedridden Joji to confess to his crimes by blinking his eyes, Joji forcefully does not blink.

== Cast ==
- Fahadh Faasil as Panachel Joji
- Baburaj as Panachel Jomon
- Basil Joseph as Fr. Kevin
- Shammi Thilakan as Dr. Felix
- Unnimaya Prasad as Bincy Jaison
- Joji Mundakkayam as Panachel Jaison
- Spadikam Sunny as Panachel Kuttappayi
- Alister Alex as Panachel Popy
- Dileesh Pothan as Dr. Roy
- Renjith Rajan as Girish
- Dhaneesh A Balan as Thotta Sudhi
- Renjith Gopali as Suresh
- Aby Thomas Iritty as Tomy, Priest Assistant
- Kunjumol Issac as Maid
- Joji Joseph as Shibu, Worker
- Issac K.G as Alex, Worker
- Tince Alex as Tony, Delivery Boy
- Roy as Doctor 2
- Divya Kiran as Nancy, Priest's wife
- Yuvan Kiran as Ryan, Priest's son
- Mohanan as Fireworks Master
- Cyriac Mathew as Popy's cousin brother
- Johny Antony as Joji's NRI Uncle (voice cameo)

=== Family Tree of Panachel family ===
Panachel Kuttappayi
Panachel Jomon	Sherly	Panachel Jaison	Bincy Jaison	Panachel Joji
Popy

== Production ==
On 3 October 2020, Fahadh Faasil announced his next collaboration with Dileesh Pothan after Maheshinte Prathikaaram and Thondimuthalum Driksakshiyum. Titled as Joji, the announcement featured a poster which informed that the film will be based on William Shakespeare's play Macbeth, also becoming the third Macbeth-based Indian film after Maqbool and Veeram. The poster also contained details about the crew, which include Shyju Khalid as cinematographer, Justin Varghese as music director and Kiran Das as editor.

Principal photography began on 13 November 2020 and was shot in Cheruvally estate and Erumely. Shooting of the film got wrapped up on 14 January 2021, within a duration of two months.

== Music ==
The film score is composed by Justin Varghese.

JOJI

Soundtrack album by Justin Varghese
- Released: April 22, 2021
- Genre: Feature film soundtrack
- Length: 23:44
- Label: Bhavana Studios
- Producer: Justin Varghese

Justin Varghese chronology
Thanneer Mathan Dinangal (2019)	JOJI (2021)	Ajagajantharam (2021)
External audio
- OST Jukebox on YouTube

Joji (Original Soundtrack)
No.	Title	Length
1.	"Main Theme"	02:35
2.	"Prophecy"	00:45
3.	"He Is Back"	01:59
4.	"The Lady Macbeth Element"	00:34
5.	"The Hook"	04:47
6.	"Fire"	01:29
7.	"Execution"	02:47
8.	"Desperation"	01:04
9.	"Fear"	02:03
10.	"Reality"	01:17
11.	"Marana Mozhi"	02:20
12.	"Trailer Music"	02:05

== Release ==
On 31 March 2021, Amazon Prime Video India released a teaser and trailer on 2 April 2021 announcing that the film will premiere through the streaming platform on 7 April 2021. Joji was selected as the winner for the Best International Feature Film at Swedish International Film Festival, 2021

== Reception ==
=== Critical response ===
The film received highly positive reviews from critics. Anupama Chopra of Film Companion wrote, "Joji is a reworking of Macbeth and while these words might suggest a period setting, Shakespeare's tragedy has been reimagined in contemporary times, on a sprawling rubber plantation in Kerala. But Joji, the youngest of three brothers, is very much a subject of his father's kingdom." Rating 4.5 out of 5 stars, Sajin Shrijith of The New Indian Express said "Joji is another brilliant, debate-worthy film about oppressed characters from the enviable imagination of Syam Pushkaran and director Dileesh Pothan. It's the duo's darkest film yet". Richard Brody of The New Yorker gave the film a positive review, noting, "The script, by Syam Pushkaran, is both practical and fiercely expressive," and concludes, writing, "Long before the plot is resolved, Joji offers a sardonic vision of patriarchal tyranny and the pathologies it spawns... [it] declares, with bitter irony, that there's no end in sight."

The Indian Express rated 3.5 and wrote, "Shakespeare's grand meshing of crime and punishment in Macbeth has spawned many film and stage versions in many languages around the world. Joji picks up the overarching theme beautifully (both writer and director have incorporated crime and punishment most innovatively in their previous work). The only time the film loses its grip, ever so slightly, is in the way it slides on the guilt which is part-and-parcel of a killing, and rolls towards an ending which feels pat. I wanted to see more of how the ‘damned spot’ would deepen, and how everyone, especially Joji, would experience it: the climactic coda feels a tad hurried." Firstpost rated 3.5 and wrote, "Joji paints an intriguing portrait of the antonym to mourning in this house of intrigue. Like some of the best of Malayalam cinema's New New Wave, it is a thoughtful, watchful film in which a chain of events unfolds at a natural pace, presenting a wealth of insights into Malayali culture and customs along the way. The succession-related concerns in the Panachel home, gossip by those claiming to support them, the local church's influence in their lives, the tense relationship between the parish priest (Basil Joseph) and this moneyed family all add up to a delightful black comedy that perhaps only Dileesh Pothan and writer Syam Pushkaran could have made."

The Times of India rated 3 and wrote, "And this is not a reflection on Dileesh Pothan's able direction, or the acting talent. Baburaj plays his part with neat restraint, whether he is drunk, comic, angry or confused, and Sunny PN conveys menace perfectly. The camera by Shyju Khalid captures the mood and is immersive, while Justin Varghese's bgm is quirky and sets the perfect tone. Ultimately, it's an exaggerated story about the darkness in a man's heart. But it will definitely be a movie that will be a part of popular culture for its characters." Sify rated 4 and wrote, "Joji is the kind of movie that shakes you up and refuses to leave you long after the end titles start rolling. It is affecting and makes you feel how easy it is for a human to give in to greed and then, face the consequences. This one is a MUST WATCH!" . The Hindu wrote, "Joji is as much a perceptive study of the slow unravelling of a criminal mind, as it is an indictment of the society and the family structure that is the origin point of that criminality. Dileesh Pothan has scored a hat-trick, with three films that are unlike each other"

Critics have also pointed out striking similarities with the 1985 Malayalam film Irakal.

== Accolades ==
Year	Award/Festival	Category	Recipient	Notes
2021	Swedish International Film Festival	Best International Feature Film	Joji	Won
2021	New York Movie Awards	Feature Film (Special Mention)	Joji	Won
2021	Vegas Movie Awards	Best Narrative Feature Award	Joji	Won
2021	Barcelona International Film Festival	Best Feature Film	Joji	Won
2021	Kerala State Film Awards	Best Director	Dileesh Pothan	Won
2021	Kerala State Film Awards	Best Character Actress	Unnimaya Prasad	Won
2021	Kerala State Film Awards	Best Adapted Screenplay	Syam Pushkaran	Won
2021	Kerala State Film Awards	Best Original Score	Justin Varghese	Won
2022	10th South Indian International Movie Awards	Best Film	Bhavana Studios, Working Class Hero, Fahadh Faasil and Friends	Nominated
2022	10th South Indian International Movie Awards	Best Director	Dileesh Pothan	Nominated
2022	10th South Indian International Movie Awards	Best Actor in a Supporting Role	Baburaj	Won
2022	10th South Indian International Movie Awards	Best Actress in a Supporting Role	Unnimaya Prasad	Won
2022	10th South Indian International Movie Awards	Best Debut Actor	Joji Mundakayam	Nominated
2022	10th South Indian International Movie Awards	Best Debut Actor	Alex Alister	Nominated
