= Aavesham (2024 film) =

2024 film by Jithu Madhavan

- Theatrical release poster
- Directed by: Jithu Madhavan
- Written by: Jithu Madhavan
- Produced by: Nazriya Nazim; Anwar Rasheed; Fahadh Faasil
- Starring: Fahadh Faasil Hipzster Mithun Jai Sankar Roshan Shanavas Sajin Gopu Mansoor Ali Khan Midhutty
- Cinematography: Sameer Thahir
- Edited by: Vivek Harshan
- Music by: Sushin Shyam
- Production companies: Anwar Rasheed Entertainments; Fahadh Faasil and Friends
- Distributed by: A & A Release
- Release date: 11 April 2024
- Running time: 159 minutes
- Country: India
- Language: Malayalam
- Budget: ₹30 crore
- Box office: ₹156 crore

Aavesham (transl. Excitement) is a 2024 Indian Malayalam-language action comedy film written and directed by Jithu Madhavan. It is produced by Fahadh Faasil, Nazriya Nazim, and Anwar Rasheed under their Fahadh Faasil and Friends and Anwar Rasheed Entertainments production banners. The film stars Fahadh Faasil, Hipzster, Mithun Jai Sankar, Roshan Shanavas, Sajin Gopu, Mansoor Ali Khan and Midhutty. In the film, three youngsters in Bengaluru befriend a local gangster to help them take revenge on their college bully.

The film was officially announced in March 2023 under the tentative title Production No.1, as it is the maiden venture of the Fahadh Faasil and Friends, and the official title was announced the following May. Principal photography commenced the same month in Bangalore, where it was predominantly shot in before wrapping by late-November. The film has music composed by Sushin Shyam, cinematography handled by Sameer Thahir and editing by Vivek Harshan.

Aavesham was released on 11 April 2024 to widespread critical acclaim from critics. The film was a commercial success grossing over ₹156 crore against a budget of ₹30 crore. It is currently one of the highest-grossing Malayalam films and the third highest-grossing Malayalam film of 2024.

== Plot ==
Aju, Bibi, and Shanthan arrive in Bengaluru from Kerala to pursue a degree in aeronautical engineering. The owner of a private hostel (BK Hostel) convinces their parents to let them stay there, warning them that the students of their college aren't friendly.

They soon find themselves to be bullied by Kutty, a psychotic senior student, and his gang, being humiliated and brutally beaten by them after being abducted and taken to a garage. Bibi and Aju try to forget the incident but are unable to. Aju seeks revenge and leads his friends to multiple bars in search of gangsters, eventually befriending Ranjith "Ranga" Gangadharan, a powerful and eccentric Malayali-Kannadiga gangster and his strong and humorous henchman Ambaan.

They become friends with Ranga, who is revealed to be good-hearted and protective of the boys and his followers. However, he doesn't take part in violence himself due to a promise made to his late mother. Ranga tells them to focus on their studies but the boys insist on going to fights with Ranga as they see it as an opportunity to strengthen their bond with him. Ambaan also tells the boys chronicles of Ranga's past where Ranga used to take part in violence and tells them about how he killed his brother and buried him in the kitchen of his house and painted his blood on the wall. When Bibi confesses to Ranga about the incident with Kutty, Ranga and his gang unleash their full fury during the college Holi celebration, beating up Kutty and his gang in front of everyone.

One night after a night out with Ranga (which usually consisted of bar visits or fight spots), Bibi leaves his phone in Ranga's car. The next morning, Bibi's mother happens to call him. Ranga answers the call and Bibi's mother tells him that Bibi had mentioned that he thinks of Ranga as his own brother which makes Ranga grow even more fond of the boys. He shows them his tools, guns and takes them to different fights because he believes he keeps them happy by doing so. The trio nearly face expulsion (or rustication) after being unable to pass exams and because of their association with Ranga, but are given a second chance on a condition that they pass all their future exams and ensure that their goon friends stay away from the college.

Their association with Ranga begins to affect their studies as Ranga keeps involving them in his lifestyle of fights and parties. One night, the trio realise that the house Ranga had given them has a corpse (that of Ranga's own brother who'd been killed by Ranga himself) buried in the kitchen just as Ambaan had told them in his pride filled stories. After this discovery, they get scared to live in that house and try everything they can to stay away from the house. Their worries escalate when they visit their old hostel and the warden requests them to accompany him to collect money from his loan takers in order to threaten them (indirectly implying that the boys have become goons due to their association with Ranga). After this, they get abducted by Reddy, Ranga's ex boss who accuses Ranga of stealing his identity and seeks their help to eliminate him. He gives them a visiting card and tells them to call him when Ranga is alone. They feel so fed up and decide on cutting ties with Ranga to avoid becoming goons like him. They try talking to Ranga about their plans of staying away from Ranga and studying in order to pass all exams, but get scared when they witness him threatening to kill two of his 'Hindi' gang members who wanted to quit the gang. Filled with fright and unable to handle staying in the house, the trio switch off their phones and leave for a different hostel in Tumkur, where they manage to study peacefully.

Meanwhile, Ranga fears that the boys have been kidnapped or hurt and frantically searches for them. After seeing his desperate attempts to find them, Bibi finally decides to confess to Ranga, telling him that they only befriended him to keep away Kutty and his gang and how negatively he had impacted their life after that chance encounter. A now-heartbroken Ranga calls his gang to the house. The anxious trio, now fearing for their life, call Reddy and his gang in order to get rid of Ranga's presence in their life.

Reddy and his goons arrive before Ranga's gang; and Ranga realises that the boys had double-crossed him. Distraught at their betrayal, he breaks his mother's vow of non-violence and goes on a rampage, killing all of Reddy goons and Reddy himself. He then chases the boys across the house, threatening to kill them. By that time, Ranga's goons also arrive at the house, ready to kill the boys, but Ranga locks the house from inside. He starts to cry, saying that he kept the boys with him as no one had gotten close to him in his life unless they needed something like money or free booze from him. After chasing them into a room, Ranga is about to kill them when Bibi's mother calls and Ranga has a friendly conversation with her. After the call, Ranga decides to spare the boys and makes them apologize to him. He tells them that he and his gang are cutting ties with them and warning them of consequences if the boys do not pass their exams.

Aju and Bibi fail one exam each out of five, while Shanthan passes all his exams. They encounter Ranga, now dressed all in black to showcase his new identity, and his gang outside the college. Due to Aju and Bibi's failures, Ranga and the gang chase the three boys collectively around the campus with sticks and knives.

== Cast ==
- Fahadh Faasil as Ranjith Gangadharan alias "Ranga", a Malayali-Kannadiga gangster in Bengaluru
- Sajin Gopu as Ambaan, Ranga's second in command
- Hipzster as Ajas "Aju" Bhasi
- Mithun Jai Sankar as Bibin "Bibi" Prakash
- Roshan Shanavas as Shanthakumaran "Shanthan"
- Midhutty as Kutty
- Neeraja Rajendran as Bibi's mother
- Thankam Mohan as Ranga's mother
- Pooja Mohanraj as Beauty
- Preeti Bhardwaj as Sweety
- Pramod Veliyanad as Ranga's cousin
- Ashish Vidyarthi as Executive Director of Engineering College
- Mansoor Ali Khan as Reddy, great Telugu gangster and Ranga's former boss
- Sreejith Babu as Bala Krishnan "BK"
- Krishna Kumar as Nanjappa, Ranga's aide
- Freestyle Krishna as Bruce Lee, Ranga's aide
- Himanshu as Jackie, Ranga's aide

== Production ==
=== Development ===
In March 2023, Jithu Madhavan announced his second film starring Fahadh Faasil, who also co-produced the film through his production company Fahadh Faasil and Friends with Anwar Rasheed Entertainments. The film's title Aavesham was announced in May 2023. Madhavan wrote the script during early-December 2022 and completed within February 2023 during the period when his debut film Romancham (2022) was delayed from October 2022 to February 2023. Though it was reported that the film is a spin-off of Romancham, Madhavan later clarified that Aavesham is a standalone film and has no connections with Romancham. The technical crew consisted of Sushin Shyam, Sameer Thahir, Vivek Harshan and Ashwini Kale as music composer, cinematographer, editor and production designer respectively.

=== Casting ===
Fahadh plays the role of Ranga, a Bangalore-based gangster; He was featured in a thick handlebar moustache and an all-white attire in a leaked picture from the film's production in May 2023. Fahadh attributed that he had not explored such characters before, which led to him agreeing to the story, adding that "Jithu [Madhavan] gave me a very clear understanding of who Ranga would be. However, we finalised the look and attire after we started filming for the movie." Compared to his previous films, Fahadh's character would be loud in the film and would speak in a mixture of Malayalam and Kannada, resembling how gangsters from the city would speak. Sajin Gopu, who previously acted in Romancham was assigned an important role in the film, with Mansoor Ali Khan and Ashish Vidyarthi in supporting roles. The film also featured newcomers including Pranav Raj – Hipzster, Mithun Jai Shankar, Roshan Shanavas and Midhutty.

=== Filming ===
Principal photography commenced in Bengaluru on the same date as the announcement. The film was shot extensively in Bengaluru and its outskirts and production completed in November 2023.

=== Costumes ===
Mashar Hamsa served as the film's costume designer. Throughout the film, Fahad's character Ranga appears in an all-white attire wearing gold chains, except for the climactic portions where Fahadh would appear in an all-black attire. Ranga's younger version sports a trimmed deep fade hairstyle and wears a windbreaker, which resembles Dali Benssalah's look from the music video of the French musical duo The Blaze's single "Territory" (2017) and also British boxer Naseem Hamed.

== Music ==
The film's soundtrack was composed by Sushin Shyam with lyrics written by Vinayak Sasikumar and featured nine songs performed by independent artists. The soundtrack was released by Think Music on 19 April 2024 after being preceded by four singles: "Jaada", "Galatta", "Illuminati" and "Mathapithakkale".

== Release ==
=== Theatrical ===
Aavesham was theatrically released on 11 April 2024, during the Eid al-Fitr and Vishu weekend. It was earlier scheduled for theatrical release during the Onam (25 August 2023) and Christmas weekends (22 December 2023), but Fahadh in July 2023 announced that the film will be released during the first quarter of 2024. Its current release date was announced in December. The film will be distributed by A&A Release across India, while Phars Film acquiring the overseas theatrical rights.

Aavesham was listed as one of the "most anticipated Malayalam films of 2024" by several publications and industry sources. (Note: Attributed to multiple references.) In comparison with Varshangalkku Shesham and Jai Ganesh which released on the same weekend, the film garnered ₹78 lakh (US$83,000) from the ticket pre-sales which opened three days prior to its release. More than 50,000 admissions from Kerala theatres were recorded from 567 tracked shows. The film, along with several other Malayalam films, were not released at PVR INOX multiplex chains across India in response to a dispute between the Film Employees Federation of Kerala and the authorities of PVR INOX management over Virtual Print Fee, as well as the federation's plans on distributing films through their newly established content providing service over Qube Cinema Technologies, the primary content provider for PVR INOX theatres. However, the ban was lifted on 13 April and the film was released in the multiplex chains the following day.

Prior to the film's release, the film garnered U/A certificate from the Central Board of Film Certification (CBFC) with the duration of the final edit being 157 minutes. A scene from the film's second half was removed prior to the theatrical showcasing in Kuwait, owing to the recommendation of the censor board.

=== Home media ===
The post-theatrical digital streaming rights were acquired by Amazon Prime Video and was premiered on 9 May 2024. The Hindi version of the film was released in Disney+ Hotstar on 20 June 2024.

=== Marketing ===
A promotional event was held at the Union Christian College, Aluva on 26 March 2024 with the presence of Fahadh, Madhavan and Shyam, along with the principal cast.

== Reception ==
Aavesham received widespread critical acclaim from critics.

=== Critical response ===
Goutham S of Pinkvilla gave 4/5 stars and wrote "Aavesham is ideally one of those movies that you could enjoy in theaters if you love a comedy film with a wild ride happening. The show is definitely run by Fahadh Faasil who is all set to entertain you with a great array of actors supporting him." Anandu Suresh of The Indian Express gave 3.5/5 stars and wrote "Jithu Madhavan's gangster comedy is arguably Fahadh Faasil's first all-encompassing masala film and the actor unabashedly uses it to silence all the criticisms against him that he can't handle mass characters."

Anna Mathews of The Times of India gave 3.5/5 stars and wrote "Apart from scripting superb side characters, Jithu Madhavan has crafted the comic timing of his dialogues well." Janani K of India Today gave 3.5/5 stars and wrote "Aavesham is truly an enjoyable affair with brilliantly choreographed action sequences and comedy sequences. If you're a fan of Fahadh Faasil, then Aavesham will prove why you became his fan in the first place." Nirmal Jovial of The Week gave 3.5/5 stars and wrote "The film maintains a celebratory mood from beginning to end, catering primarily to a youthful audience."

Arjun Menon of Rediff rated 3/5 stars and applauded "Aavesham is smooth in its storytelling and leaves a chilling aftertaste, thanks to its one-of-a-kind anti-hero." Swathi P Ajith of Onmanorama termed it as "the perfect choice if you're seeking laughter and entertainment in equal measure." S. R. Praveen of The Hindu wrote "Romancham director Jithu Madhavan returns with his sophomore effort, that is held afloat by Fahadh Faasil running riot in one of his most colourful characters."

=== Box office ===
On the opening day of its release, the film grossed ₹3.9 crore in Kerala, gaining the first spot between concurrent releases Varshangalku Shesham and Jai Ganesh. The film's ticket sales were further boosted by its positive word of mouth, which helped it to earn a total of ₹18.75 crore in India with a total worldwide collection of ₹40.50 crore gross in 4 days of its release. As of 19 April 2024, the film has grossed ₹65 crore worldwide.

As of 24 April 2024, the film grossed ₹59.50 crore at the Indian box office, ₹40.75 crore (US$4.89 million) from overseas, giving it a worldwide gross of ₹100.25 crore. By 13 May 2024, the film has grossed ₹54 crore (US$6.50 million) from overseas for a worldwide gross of around ₹154.60 crore and ₹100.60 crore from India and has become only the third Malayalam film ever to gross more than ₹100 crore in India. The two films preceding it were 2018 and Manjummel Boys. It concluded its run with worldwide gross estimated to be ₹156 crore.

== Accolades ==
Year	Award	Category	Recipient(s)	Result	Ref.
2024	Mazhavil Entertainment Awards	Entertainer of the Year – Film	Fahadh Faasil, Nazriya Nazim and Anwar Rasheed	Won	

== Sequel ==
A sequel titled Aavesham 2 was confirmed by Sajin Gopu and is currently under development.
