= C U Soon =

2020 Indian film

- Release poster
- Directed by: Mahesh Narayanan
- Written by: Mahesh Narayanan
- Produced by: Fahadh Faasil; Nazriya Nazim
- Starring: Fahadh Faasil; Roshan Mathew; Darshana Rajendran
- Cinematography: Sabin Uralikandy; Virtual cinematography: Mahesh Narayanan
- Edited by: Mahesh Narayanan
- Music by: Gopi Sundar
- Production companies: Fahadh Faasil and Friends
- Distributed by: Amazon Prime Video
- Release date: 1 September 2020
- Running time: 98 minutes
- Country: India
- Language: Malayalam

C U Soon (stylized as c u soon.) is a 2020 Malayalam-language Indian screenlife mystery thriller film written and directed by Mahesh Narayanan. The film is set in a computer screen and stars Fahadh Faasil, Roshan Mathew and Darshana Rajendran, with Saiju Kurup, Amalda Liz and Maala Parvathi in supporting roles. Produced by Fahadh Faasil and Nazriya Nazim, the film was released on 1 September 2020 on Amazon Prime Video.

The film was shot on an iPhone. Upon its OTT release, it received positive reviews from the critics. It is India's first screenlife film. The making of the film is similar to the American film Searching (2018).

== Plot ==
Jimmy is a Client Executive in Union National Bank in the UAE. He meets Anu on a dating app and falls in love with the timid girl. He chats with her on Hangouts and Duo, but she does not reveal the background of her room, mostly chatting from bed. Despite never meeting her in person, Jimmy introduces Anu to his mother and cousin and proposes to her via video call. Jimmy's mother is curious to know more about the girl and asks Jimmy's cousin, Kevin, who is a cyber security specialist, for help to get more details about her. Kevin, though reluctant, agrees and finds some basic information about Anu by hacking into her IP address. Unknown to Kevin, his girlfriend, Sanjana, places a bug on Anu's phone to understand Kevin's sudden interest in Anu. Sanjana becomes jealous and possessive and keeps messaging him, infuriating Kevin.

Things get complicated when Anu calls Jimmy one day to inform him that she was hurt as her father, Joseph, beat her leading to a few injuries. Jimmy who loves Anu brings her to his own home and provides her with medicine prescribed by his friend, Dr. Prashanth, who advises him to report the incident to the police and also that living in relationships is illegal in the UAE. Later, Jimmy confronts Anu's father for his behavior who apologizes to him and asks for Anu's phone number. Jimmy shares it with him and updates Anu about the confrontation. Anu leaves a suicide note video to Jimmy and goes missing. The police get involved and take Jimmy into custody.

To prove Jimmy's innocence and solve the mystery, Jimmy's family seeks the help of Kevin. Kevin hacks Anu's Facebook account and finds out that she came to the UAE via an agency as a housemaid. She is then sold as a prostitute and when she doesn't cooperate, gets beaten up. Joseph Tharakan, whom Anu calls father is not her father but a family man in Kerala and a pimp in Dubai, who hires girls from India for jobs as maids and when they come to Dubai, forces them into prostitution. Kevin informs Jimmy's mother about Anu's situation. Jimmy gets to know the truth about Anu and is angry with Kevin because he didn't tell him about this, especially since Jimmy thought Anu had cheated on him.

Kevin finds out that Anu's last known location was the Indian Consulate General in Dubai. Further checking reveals that she reported the prostitution racket to the officials and all those involved were caught. Anu was sent back to India. Jimmy goes to the U.S. to be with his mother. Kevin asks Jimmy if he still loves Anu. Kevin also speaks to Anu and he understands that both still love each other. The movie ends when Kevin shares Anu's phone number with Jimmy and asks him to call her.

== Cast ==
- Fahadh Faasil as Kevin Thomas
- Roshan Mathew as Jimmy Kurien
- Darshana Rajendran as Anumol Sebastian
- Saiju Kurup as Dr. Prasanth
- Maala Parvathi as Mariyamma Kurien
- Kottayam Ramesh as Jacob Sebastian
- Amalda Liz as Sanjana
- Vaishnavi Venugopal as Neethu Kurien

== Production ==
In June 2020, Mahesh Narayanan announced that his next venture would be an experimental one, starring Fahadh Faasil in a lead role. Mahesh described the film as a small exercise using an iPhone rather than a feature film. It was also revealed that the film would be about 60–65 minutes (the final release time amounted to 1 hour 38minutes) in length and shot in Fahadh's flat. Although the film got approval from the Film Employees Federation of Kerala (FEFKA), the Kerala Film Producers Association (KFPA) was opposed to the shoot with regards to the disruptions caused by the COVID-19 pandemic. Despite this, filming was successfully completed on 21 August.

== Release ==
C U Soon was released on Amazon Prime Video on 1 September 2020.

== Reception ==
BBC wrote that "India's 'lockdown film' is an edgy thriller". NDTV wrote that "C U Soon, frisky in pace but grounded in unwavering technique, is an affirmation of cinema's capacity to be creative and hopeful no matter how grave and protracted a crisis is". The Indian Express gave the film a rating of three-and-a-half out of five stars and wrote that " Producers Fahadh Faasil and Nazriya Nazim, and director Mahesh Narayanan pick up a story with disturbingly familiar outlines and impart it with fresh urgency and impact, making each frame of the 1 hour 38 minutes run time count". The New Indian Express wrote that "C U Soon is an immersive experience like no other. This is a neatly written and executed film elevated to a great degree by the right cast and the right music composer". Rediff gave the film a rating of three-and-a-half out of five stars and noted that "Mahesh Narayanan, by turning his passion into his subject matter, by turning machines into curtains behind which we hide and through which we reveal ourselves in surprising ways, has achieved the human scale". The Times of India gave the film a rating of four out of five stars, and stated: "What Take Off filmmaker Mahesh Narayanan has done is use that experimental concept of technology to tell a hard-hitting socially relevant story inspired by shocking real-life incidents such as trafficking and invasion of privacy, set in two countries and told mainly through three characters who keep you glued to the screens". Baradwaj Rangan of Film Companion South wrote: "The last half-hour is a cracker".

The Hindu wrote: "The performances of the three lead actors gives the Malayalam film its emotional core, without which it could have remained a mere showcase of technical mastery".
