= Dileesh Pothan =

Malayalam film director and actor

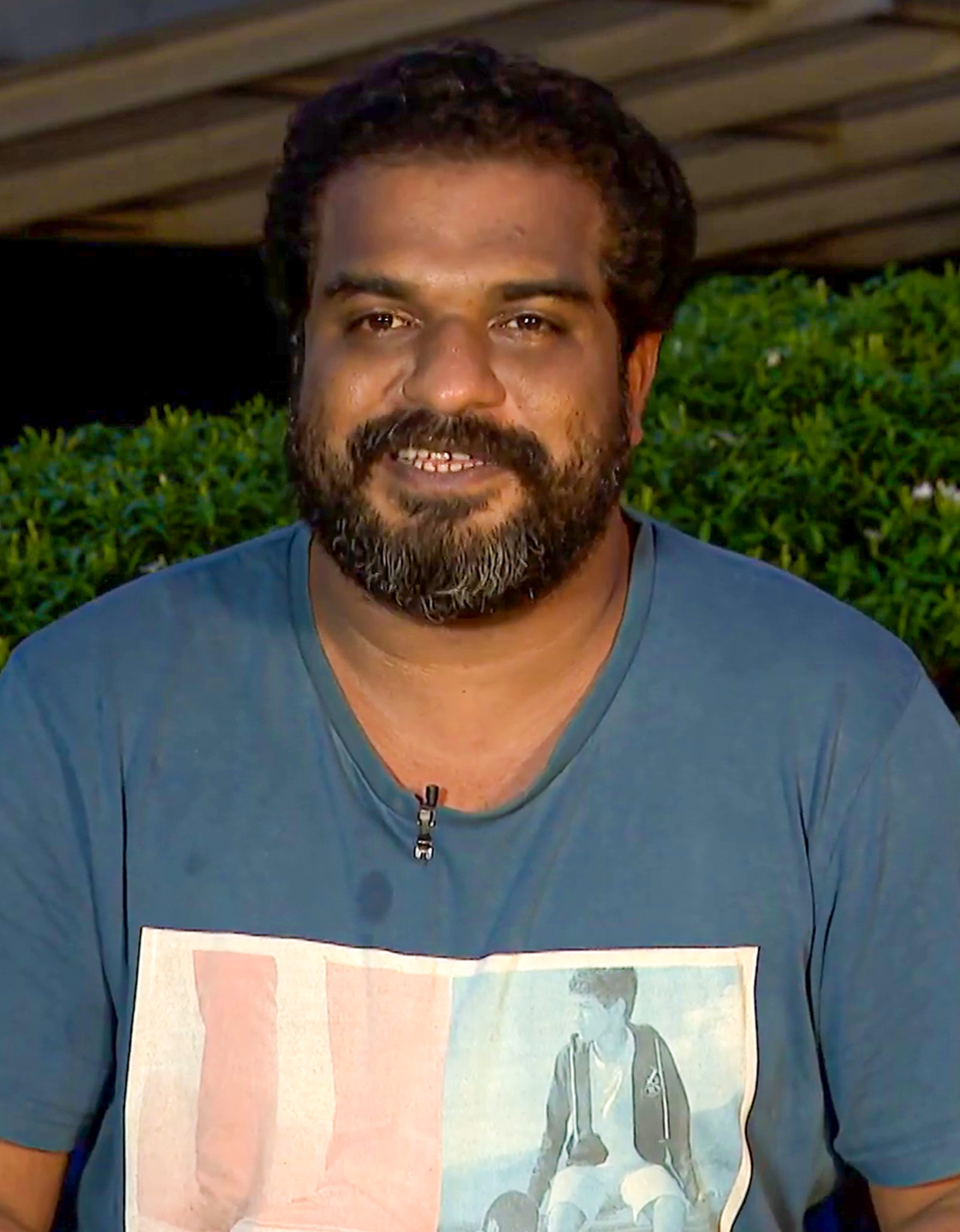
- Dileesh in 2019
- Born: 19 February 1980 (age 46); Kottayam, Kerala, India
- Education: Mahatma Gandhi University, Kottayam (MPhil); Sree Sankaracharya University of Sanskrit (M.A)
- Occupations: Actor; director; producer
- Years active: 2008–present
- Organisation(s): Working Class Hero; Bhavana Studios
- Known for: Maheshinte Prathikaaram; Thondimuthalum Driksakshiyum; Joji
- Spouse: Jimsy (m. 2013)
- Children: 2

Dileesh Philip (born 19 February 1980), also known as Dileesh Pothan, is an Indian film director, actor and producer, who works in Malayalam cinema. He made his directorial debut with the 2016 comedy drama film Maheshinte Prathikaaram, starring Fahadh Faasil. The film received the Best Feature Film in Malayalam Award at the 64th National Film Awards. Pothan also won the Best Director Award at the 64th Filmfare Awards South.

Pothan began his career as an assistant director for the 2010 film 9 KK Road. He also assisted director Aashiq Abu in five of Aashiq's films. He made his acting debut as a film director in one scene in Aashiq's 2011 film Salt N' Pepper. His second directional was Thondimuthalum Driksakshiyum (2017), which was also a critical and commercial hit. Thondimuthalum Driksakshiyum won the Best Feature Film in Malayalam Award as well at the 65th National Film Awards. His third and latest film Joji, also starring Fahadh Faasil, released to highly positive reviews on the OTT platform of Amazon Prime Video in April 2021. Joji won the best International Film Award at the Swedish International Film Festival (SIFF 2021).

== Personal life ==
Dileesh Pothan was born in Manjoor, Kottayam, Kerala. He did his schooling at Emmanuel's High School, Kothanalloor. After pre-degree from Kuriakose Elias College, Mannanam, he pursued a BSc degree at St. Philomena's College, Mysore. Due to his keen interest in drama and cinema, he followed up with an M.A. in Theatre Arts at Sree Sankaracharya University of Sanskrit, Kalady and an M.Phil. in Theatre Arts from Mahatma Gandhi University, Kottayam. Pothan married Jimsy in December 2012 at St. Thomas Church, Kuruppanthara. They have a daughter and a son.

== Film career ==
Pothan started his film career as an assistant director in the film 9 KK Road (2010). Later on he became an associate director to Aashiq Abu. He assisted Aashiq Abu in films like 22 Female Kottayam (2012), Da Thadiya (2012), and Gangster (2014). He was the chief associate director in Dileesh Nair's 2014 film Tamaar Padaar.

His first appearance in front of a movie camera was as a junior artist in the movie Chandranudikunna Dikkil (1999) directed by Lal Jose. Later his first proper role as an actor was in Salt N' Pepper. He has also acted in small roles mostly in Aashiq Abu's films, Salt N' Pepper (2011), 22 Female Kottayam (2012), Idukki Gold (2013), Gangster (2014), Iyobinte Pusthakam (2014), and Rani Padmini (2015). He has acted in several films since then.

Pothan ventured into film production by forming the film production company Working Class Hero in 2018, partnered by Syam Pushkaran. Their first movie was Kumbalangi Nights.

== Filmography ==
Key
†	Denotes films that have not yet been released

- All films are in Malayalam language unless otherwise noted.

=== As director ===
Year	Title	Notes
2016	Maheshinte Prathikaaram	
2017	Thondimuthalum Driksakshiyum	
2021	Joji	
2027	Nedumkandam Miracle †	

=== As producer ===
Year	Title	Notes
2019	Kumbalangi Nights	Co-produced with Fahadh Faasil and Friends
2021	Joji	Produced by Bhavana Studios in association with Fahadh Faasil and Friends & Working Class Hero
2022	Palthu Janwar	Produced by Bhavana Studios in association with Fahadh Faasil and Friends & Working Class Hero
2023	Thankam	Produced by Bhavana Studios in association with Fahadh Faasil and Friends & Working Class Hero
2024	Premalu	Produced by Bhavana Studios in association with Fahadh Faasil and Friends & Working Class Hero
2026	Bethlehem Kudumba Unit	Produced by Bhavana Studios in association with Fahadh Faasil and Friends & Working Class Hero

=== As actor ===
Year	Title	Role	Notes
2011	Salt N' Pepper	Movie director	
2012	22 Female Kottayam	Advocate	
2013	5 Sundarikal	Security (Segment: Kullante Bharya)	Also as Abhilash's father in Sethulakshmi
2013	Idukki Gold	Employee at 'Mathrubhumi'	
2014	Gangster	DySP Vithura Chengalath	
2014	Hangover	Krishna Kumar	
2014	Tamaar Padaar	Sibi Karimannur	
2014	Iyobinte Pusthakam	Tea shop owner	
2015	Chandrettan Evideya	Naadi Jyothishi	
2015	Ennum Eppozhum	Deepa's client's Son	
2015	Rani Padmini	Ullas Menon	
2016	Guppy	Krishnan	
2016	Maheshinte Prathikaaram	Eldho	Also director
2017	Aby	CI George	
2017	Rakshadhikari Baiju Oppu	George	Cameo appearance
2017	Comrade in America	Hari	
2017	Role Models	Gautam's boss	
2017	Njandukalude Nattil Oridavela	Varkichan	
2017	Pullikkaran Staraa	Kuriachan / "Stephen"	
2017	Tharangam	God	
2017	Pokkiri Simon	CI Alex	
2017	Honey Bee 2.5	Director Thomas George	
2018	Carbon	Thamban	
2018	Ee.Ma.Yau	Vikariyachan	
2018	Rosapoo	Kuttan	
2018	Kadha Paranja Kadha		
2018	Neerali	Rajan	
2018	Ente Mezhuthiri Athazhangal	Sony George	
2018	Padayottam	Senan	
2018	Varathan	Benny	
2018	Drama	Dixon Lopez	
2018	Oru Kuprasidha Payyan	Dr. P. Suresh Babu	
2018	Ladoo	Suresh	
2018	Joseph	Peter	
2018	Ente Ummante Peru	Shivankutty	
2018	Ennalum Sarath	Doctor	
2018	Samaksham		
2019	Neeyum Njnanum		
2019	Lonappante Mamodeesa	Kunjuoottan	
2019	Kumbalangi Nights	Circle Inspector Raju Unni	Cameo appearance
2019	Vaarikkuzhiyile Kolapathakam	Joy	
2019	Oru Yamandan Premakadha	Abhilash Karikkan	
2019	Thottappan	Jonappan	
2019	Virus	Prakashan	
2019	Unda	C.I. K. Mathukutty	
2019	Pranaya Meenukalude Kadal	Ansari	
2019	Moothon	Moosa	Bilingual film (Hindi, Malayalam)
2019	Sidharthan Enna Njan		
2019	Thakkol		
2019	Kolaambi	Sudharshan	
2020	Trance	Avarachan	
2021	Joji	Dr. Roy	
2021	Malik	P. A. Aboobacker	
2021	Djibouti	Thomachan	
2022	Bheeshmaparvam	TV James	
2022	Pada	Narayanankutty	
2022	Prakashan Parakkatte	Prakashan	
2022	Shalamon		
2022	Kallan D’Souza	Manoj	
2022	Palthu Janwar	Priest	
2022	Kaapa	Latheef	
2023	Christopher	ADGP Abhilash Balakrishnan IPS	
2023	O.Baby	Othayathu Baby	
2023	Garudan	IG Cyriac Joseph IPS	
2024	Abraham Ozler	Sudhakaran Payyarath / Dr. Alexander Joseph	
2024	Manasa Vacha	Dharavi Dinesh	
2024	Turbo	Andrew	
2024	Thalavan	DySP Udhayabanu	
2024	Golam	Issac John	
2024	Vishesham	Sajitha's Ex. husband	
2024	Gumasthan	Adv. Thomas Kuruvila	
2024	I Am Kathalan	Chacko Periyadan	
2024	Rifle Club	Kaduvachalil Avaran Skaria	
2025	Am Ah		
2025	Machante Maalakha		
2025	Ouseppinte Osyath	Michael	
2025	Ronth	Grade SI Yohannan	
2025	Cherukkanum Pennum		
2026	Oru Durooha Saahacharyathil	Madhu	
2026	Udumbanchola Vision	George	
2026	Bouma	Esho	
2026	Chevittorma	Varkey	

=== As associate director ===
- 3 char sau bees (2010)
- 22 Female Kottayam (2012)
- Da Thadiya (2012)
- 5 Sundarikal (2013)
- Idukki Gold (2013)
- Gangster (2013)
- Tamaar Padaar (2014)

== Awards ==
Year	Film	Award	Category	Notes
2016	Maheshinte Prathikaaram	64th National Film Awards	Best Feature Film in Malayalam	Shared with Aashiq Abu
2016	Maheshinte Prathikaaram	47th Kerala State Film Awards	Best Film with Popular Appeal and Aesthetic Value	Shared with Aashiq Abu
2016	Maheshinte Prathikaaram	64th Filmfare Awards South	Best Director	
2016	Maheshinte Prathikaaram	64th Filmfare Awards South	Best Film – Malayalam	
2016	Maheshinte Prathikaaram	Padmarajan Award		
2016	Maheshinte Prathikaaram	CPC Cine Awards	Best Director	
2016	Maheshinte Prathikaaram	North American Film Awards	Best Debut Director	
2016	Maheshinte Prathikaaram	North American Film Awards	Best Movie	
2016	Maheshinte Prathikaaram	Vanitha Film Awards	Best Movie	Shared with Aashiq Abu
2016	Maheshinte Prathikaaram	Asianet Film Awards	Critic's Awards for Best Film	
2017	Thondimuthalum Driksakshiyum	65th National Film Awards	Best Feature Film in Malayalam	Shared with Sandip Senan and Anish M. Thomas
2017	Thondimuthalum Driksakshiyum	International Film Festival of Kerala	NETPAC Award	
2017	Thondimuthalum Driksakshiyum	65th Filmfare Awards South	Best Director	
2017	Thondimuthalum Driksakshiyum	65th Filmfare Awards South	Best Film	
2017	Thondimuthalum Driksakshiyum	7th South Indian International Movie Awards	Best Film	
2017	Thondimuthalum Driksakshiyum	Movie Street Film Awards	Best Movie	
2017	Thondimuthalum Driksakshiyum	CPC Cine Awards	Best Movie	
2017	Thondimuthalum Driksakshiyum	Kerala Film Critics Association Awards	Best Director	
2017	Thondimuthalum Driksakshiyum	Vanitha Film Awards	Best Director	
2017	Thondimuthalum Driksakshiyum	Asianet Film Awards	Best Film	
2017	Thondimuthalum Driksakshiyum	Asiavision Awards	Best Film	
2017	Thondimuthalum Driksakshiyum	North American Film Awards	Best Film	
2019	Kumbalangi Nights	Kerala State Film Awards	Best Film with Popular Appeal and Aesthetic Value	Shared with Fahadh Faasil, Syam Pushkaran
2021	Joji	Kerala State Film Awards	Best Director	
2024	Premalu	Kerala State Film Awards	Best Film with Popular Appeal and Aesthetic Value	Shared with Fahadh Faasil, Syam Pushkaran

== Filmmaking style ==
Pothan's filmmaking style shows influences from the KG George school, with attention to detail and blend of traditional and contemporary Kerala elements. In Maheshinte Prathikaram, Pothan emphasizes detail and uses various cinematic elements—song, weather, setting, and drama—to support the narrative.
