= Sameera Saneesh =

Indian costume and fashion designer (born 1983)

- Born: Sameera; 27 June 1983 (age 43)
- Occupations: Costume designer (feature films and television ads); Fashion designer
- Spouse: Saneesh K. J. (2006 – present)
- Awards: State Film Awards (2014 and 2018)

Sameera Saneesh (born 27 June 1983) is an Indian costume-cum-fashion designer from Kerala, known for her extensive work in Malayalam-language films. She is a recipient of three Kerala State Film Awards for Best Costume Designer (2014,2018 and 2025). As of March, 2019, she has been part of around 150 feature films. She is often described by the media as "busiest costume designer in Malayalam film industry".

== Early and personal life ==
Sameera was born to Ibrahim and Jameela in June, 1983. She completed her undergraduate degree at Bharat Mata College, Cochin. It was her fondness for drawing and fabric painting that saw her join for a diploma in fashion designing. She is married to Saneesh K. J., a Kochi-based engineer. She has cited her late mother Jameela as major influence on her life and career. Sabyasachi Mukherjee, a famous fashion designer from Kolkata, is the "favorite designer" of Sameera Saneesh.

== Career ==
Sameera holds a diploma in fashion designing from National Institute for Fashion Designing, Cochin. She started her professional career as an in-house designer for Raymond. She had already started freelancing costumes for ad films while studying in Cochin. She started with television ads for Soundarya Silks and her ad for the Seemas brand, shot in Mysore Palace, was widely appreciated. She went on to design costumes for the television commercials for Bhima, Alukkas, Kalyan Silks, Dhatri, Nirapara and the VKC. Some of these television ads featured major film actors of south India, such as Nithya Menon and Prithviraj Sukumaran.

Sameera's first film as costume designer was The White Elephant, a 2008 low-profile Hindi film, directed by Aijaz Khan.

In 2009, her first major commercial film, Aashiq Abu's Daddy Cool, was released. Sameera currently holds to her credit an award by Limca Book of Records for "designing costumes for a large number of films in a very short span of time". She has a supporting team of around 25 people designing and creating clothes for the film characters.

== Filmography ==
- All films in Malayalam unless otherwise noted

Year	Film	Notes
2009	Kerala Cafe	
2009	Daddy Cool	
2010	Kadha Thudarunnu	
2010	Best Actor	
2010	Aagathan	
2010	Malarvaadi Arts Club	
2010	Pranchiyettan & the Saint	
2010	In Ghost House Inn	
2010	Kadha Thudarunnu	
2011	Kudumbasree Travels	
2011	Arjunan Saakshi	
2011	Payyans	
2011	Salt N' Pepper	
2011	Chaappa Kurishu	
2011	Pranayam	
2011	Doctor Love	
2011	Indian Rupee	
2013	Annayum Rasoolum	
2013	Shutter	
2013	Immanuel	
2013	Ladies and Gentleman	
2013	Up & Down: Mukalil Oralundu	
2013	ABCD: American-Born Confused Desi	
2013	5 Sundarikal	
2013	Buddy	
2013	Kadal Kadannu Oru Maathukutty	
2013	Kalimannu	
2013	North 24 Kaatham	
2013	Idukki Gold	
2013	Punyalan Agarbattis	
2013	Thira	
2013	Unnam	
2013	Ordinary	
2013	Mayamohini	
2013	Cobra	
2013	22 Female Kottayam	
2013	Spirit	
2013	Ustad Hotel	
2013	Thattathin Marayathu	
2013	Molly Aunty Rocks!	
2013	Ayalum Njanum Thammil	
2013	Theevram	
2013	Jawan of Vellimala	
2013	Chapters	
2013	Bavuttiyude Namathil	
2013	Da Thadiya	
2013	Cobra: Kottayam Brothers	
2013	Jawan of Vellimala	
2013	Ordinary	
2013	Thattathin Marayathu	
2013	Chapters	
2013	Shutter	
2013	Ezhu Sundara Rathrikal	
2013	Thira	
2014	How Old Are You?	
2014	Vegam	
2015	Mariyam Mukku	
2015	Jamna Pyari	
2015	Pathemari	
2015	Amar Akbar Anthony	
2016	Paavada	
2016	Maheshinte Prathikaaram	
2016	Jacobinte Swargarajyam	
2016	School Bus	
2016	Kasaba	
2016	Kochavva Paulo Ayyappa Coelho	
2016	Oru Muthassi Gadha	
2016	Thoppil Joppan	
2016	Ore Mukham	
2017	Ayal Jeevichiruppundu	
2017	Alamaara	
2017	C/O Saira Banu	
2017	Puthan Panam	
2017	Rakshadhikari Baiju Oppu	
2017	Godha	
2017	Oru Cinemakkaran	
2017	Role Models	
2017	Thondimuthalum Dhriksakshiyum	
2017	Utharam Parayaathe	
2017	Thrissivaperoor Kliptham	
2017	Velipadinte Pusthakam	
2017	Ramaleela	
2017	Vaalujada	Telugu
2017	Comrade in America	
2017	Lavakusha	
2017	Y	
2017	Vimaanam	
2017	Mayaanadhi	
2018	Mangalyam Thanthunanena	
2018	Ente Mezhuthiri Athazhangal	
2018	Thobama	
2018	Orayiram Kinakkalal	
2018	Street Lights	
2018	Ente Ummante Peru	
2018	Kammara Sambhavam	
2019	Sathyam Paranja Viswasikkuvo	
2019	Marconi Mathai	
2019	Virus	
2019	Children's Park	
2019	Athiran	
2019	Mera Naam Shaji	
2019	An International Local Story	
2019	Kumbalangi Nights	
2019	9: Nine	
2020	Dhamakha	
2020	Forensic	
2020	Sufiyum Sujatayum	
2020	Maniyarayile Ashokan	
2021	Yuvam	
2021	Aanum Pennum	
2021	Aarkkariyaam	
2021	Nayattu	
2021	Chathur Mukham	
2021	Saras	
2021	Meow	
2021	Madhuram	
2021	Kala	
2022	Beeshma Paravam	
2022	Karnan Napoleon Bhagath Singh	
2022	Archana 31 Not Out	
2022	Lalitham Sundharam	
2022	Makal	
2022	Puzhu	
2022	Meri Awas Suno	
2022	Kappa	
2022	Kaduva	
2022	Rorschach	
2022	Kotthu	
2022	Theerppu	
2022	John Luther	
2022	Ullasam	
2022	19(1)(a)	
2022	Oruthee	
2022	Oru Thekkan Thallu Case	
2022	Jack N Jill	
2022	Varayan	
2022	Priyan Ottathilanu	
2022	Ela Veezha Poonichira	
2023	Iratta	
2023	Christy	
2023	Thuramukham	
2023	Pranaya Vilasam	
2023	Vellari Pattanam	
2024	Amaran	
