= Suhas-Sharfu =

Indian screenwriter duo

- Born: Suhas Namboothiri; Sharafudheen; Kerala
- Years active: 2018-present
- Notable work: Varathan, Virus, Puzhu

Suhas and Sharfu are an Indian screenwriter duo working in Malayalam cinema. They wrote a total of six films, beginning with Varathan in 2018.

== Career ==
They were both engineers before their film careers and met through the short film network and social media. Suhas is from Thripunithura and Sharfu from Kozhikode. Suhas and Sharfu were assistant director and associate director respectively for the 2018 film Sudani From Nigeria. Through Sameer Thahir, one of the producers of the movie, they met Amal Neerad. Suhas said in an interview about their first movie, "We had approached Amal Neerad with another script, that didn’t work out instead Varathan came to be." The movie was well received. The Hindu wrote, "The screenplay by the Suhas–Sharfu duo is solid. They vividly etch different shades of misogyny, voyeurism and ensuing paranoia and drama, something every woman can relate to."

After the commercial success of Varathan, the director Aashiq Abu invited them to co-write the screenplay of Virus with Muhsin Parari. The movie was set against the backdrop of the 2018 Nipah virus outbreak in Kerala. The movie received critical acclaim and was a box office success.

In March 2020, Suhas and Sharfu joined as co-writers in Karthick Naren's Tamil film Maaran, starring Dhanush. The film was released on 11 March 2022 to mixed reviews. Their next release was Puzhu, starring Mammootty and Parvathy Thiruvothu. It was the first film directed by Ratheena P. T., from a story by Harshad, writer of the movie Unda. Suhas and Sharfu co-wrote the screenplay with Harshad. A direct-to-digital release, the movie gained critical acclaim.

Their third release in 2022 was Dear Friend, directed by Vineeth Kumar and starring Tovino Thomas. Sharfu and Suhas joined the actor Arjun Lal in his first screenwriting role. The movie was a box office failure, but critics praised its unusual theme and out-of-the-box narrative.

Sharfu is also a lyricist. He debuted into song writing by penning the song "'Thonnal'" for a music video directed by Ahaana Krishna in 2021. He has penned songs in movies like Madhuram, Jana Gana Mana, Adi, Kadina Kadoramee Andakadaham, Jackson Bazaar Youth etc.

== Filmography ==
Year	Movie	Director	Notes
2018	Varathan	Amal Neerad	Debut
2019	Virus	Aashiq Abu	Co-wrote the screenplay with Muhsin Parari
2022	Maaran	Karthick Naren	Tamil film; Co-wrote the screenplay with Karthick Naren and Vivek
2022	Puzhu	Ratheena P. T.	Co-wrote the screenplay with Harshad
2022	Dear Friend	Vineeth Kumar	Co-wrote the screenplay with Arjun Lal
2024	Rifle Club	Aashiq Abu	Co-wrote the screenplay with Syam Pushkaran and Dileesh Nair
TBA	Mattancherry Mafia	Khalid Rahman	Co-wrote the screenplay with Niyog Krishna and Thasreeq Abdul Salam
TBA	Untitled Vismaya Mohanlal movie	Arun Bose	Co-wrote the screenplay with Ratheena P. T.
