= Tadka (film) =

2022 film

- Official release poster
- Directed by: Prakash Raj
- Written by: Surya Menon; Sagar Haveli
- Story by: Syam Pushkaran; Dileesh Nair
- Based on: Salt N' Pepper by: Syam Pushkaran; Dileesh Nair
- Produced by: Sameer Dixit; Jatish Varma; Prakash Raj
- Starring: Nana Patekar; Shriya Saran; Ali Fazal; Taapsee Pannu
- Cinematography: Preetha Jayaraman
- Edited by: A. Sreekar Prasad
- Music by: Anup Rubens
- Production companies: Prakash Raj Productions; Fortune Pictures
- Distributed by: ZEE5
- Release date: 4 November 2022
- Country: India
- Language: Hindi

Tadka is a 2022 Indian Hindi-language romantic comedy-drama film directed by actor Prakash Raj, starring Nana Patekar, Ali Fazal, Shriya Saran and Taapsee Pannu. The story of the film is based in Goa and filming began in May 2016. It is a remake of the 2011 Malayalam film Salt N' Pepper. The film was released on ZEE5 on 4 November 2022.

== Cast ==
- Nana Patekar as Tukaram Dalvi/Tukka
- Shriya Saran as Madhura
- Ali Fazal as Siddharth
- Taapsee Pannu as Nicole Anne Mascarenhas
- Rajesh Sharma as Bavarchi, the cook
- Lillete Dubey as Samantha Mascarenhas
- Naveen Kaushik as Danny
- Murali Sharma as Tebli Singh
- Iravati Harshe as Urmi

== Production ==
Prakash Raj also starred in the Kannada, Tamil and Telugu versions of the film opposite Sneha which also features an original soundtrack by Ilaiyaraja. The film stars Nana Patekar, Ali Fazal, Shriya Saran and Taapsee Pannu. The film is based in Goa and it went on floor in May 2016.
