= Dileesh =

Dileesh or Dilesh is an Indic masculine given name. Notable people with this name include:

- Dilesh Gunaratne, Sri Lankan cricketer
- Dileesh Nair (born 1981), Indian film director and script writer
- Dileesh Pothan, Indian film director and actor
- Dileesh Thiruvangalath, Indian Sales executive
