= Maheshinte Prathikaaram (soundtrack) =

Soundtrack album by Bijibal
- Released: 1 January 2016
- Recorded: 2015
- Genre: Film soundtrack
- Length: 14:31
- Language: Malayalam
- Label: Muzik 247
- Producer: Bijibal

Bijibal chronology
Leela (2016)	Maheshinte Prathikaaram (2016)	Pinneyum (2016)

Maheshinte Prathikaaram is the soundtrack album for the 2016 Indian film of the same name. The album was composed by Bijibal, features four songs and was distributed by Muzik 247, which released on 1 January 2016. The album received positive feedback from music listeners.

== Production ==
About the development and concept of "Idukki", Pothan said that the song helped him introduce the audience to the story's locale: "It was the plot of the movie that came to my mind first. Then I decided to fix the milieu in Idukki. Not all viewers may have been to Idukki". According to the director, "A person from an urban setting may not go on to take revenge like what the central character does in Maheshinte Prathikaram. Hence, I had to convey the lifestyle of [the] Idukki people to the audience". Lyricist Rafeeq Ahammed said that he had never visited Idukki or felt deeply about the district. He asked friends in Idukki: "They told me that they wanted a song that captures the beauty of the place. It is one of the beautiful places in Kerala embellished with forests and rivers". The music was composed after the lyrics were written; Ahammed wrote the song as a poem in one day. According to Bijibal, it was easy to compose "Idukki" because it had such "motivating lyrics". He originally recorded the song with a small orchestra, singing it himself. The composer later recorded another version with a lush orchestra; however, Pothan thought it lacked the beauty of the original and used the first version in the film.

In addition to her role as Jimsy, Aparna Balamurali sang "Mounangal" with Vijay Yesudas. At her audition, she also sang. Aparna was recommended by Pushkaran's wife, who is her university instructor. According to the actress, "I was made to sing while at the set quite frequently. Later, it must have struck them that it is a good idea to give me a song".

A song titled "Ethetho" written by M. R. Jayageetha was initially recorded but never included in the film. Later the song was used with Telugu lyrics in Uma Maheswara Ugra Roopasya, Telugu remake of the film. The original version was released in August 2020 on Bijibal's official YouTube channel.

== Music video ==
The video of the first song, "Idukki" (featuring Fahadh Faasil) was released on 1 February 2016. It was sung by Bijibal and written by Rafeeq Ahamed. The song, which begins with the line "Malamele Thirivech", describes the beauty of Kerala's Western Ghats. The song video of "Theliveyil" sung by Sudeep Kumar and Sangeetha Sreekanth, which released on 4 February 2016; was set at a funeral ceremony as its backdrop and begins with a brief vocal by children. The video songs of other tracks "Mounangal" and "Cherupunjiri" was released on 5 and 7 February.

== Reception ==
Malayala Manorama placed "Mounangal" at number one on their Tunes Weekly for 12 February 2016. According to reviewer Nelson K. Paul, "Composer Bijibal perfects this one with the finer layers—of clarinet, of saxophone, of violins, of guitars, of sitar, to name it all—added in. These elements blend in the right proportions to produce a rather affecting song. Vijay Yesudas and Aparna Balamurali make no mistake behind the microphone. The loop before the charanam is musically rich with the enchanting association of the instruments mentioned above. Class act by the composer, once again". Although Paul called "Idukki" the film's best song, he also found "Mounangal" charming. He praised Bijibal for his work on "Idukki": "His brilliance, as a composer and singer, is in display in the 'Idukki' song. The composer-singer gives Rafeeq's simple, smile-evoking lyrics the right treatment, keeping to minimal instruments while executing a soulful rendition. He is ably backed by the wonderful female chorus. Even without the visuals, one would long to feel the beauty of Idukki". Elizabeth Thomas of The Hindu described the song: "We feel like standing right in the middle of the hilly terrain. As the song goes on describing Idukki, its people, and their lifestyle, we sway and swoon along, feel the mist and greenery and as the song ends, we become one with the place and its people".

== Track listing ==
All lyrics are written by Rafeeq Ahamed, except "Cherupunjiri", which was written by Santhosh Varma

No.	Title	Singer(s)	Length
1.	"Idukki"	Bijibal, Chorus	3:51
2.	"Theliveyil"	Sudeep Kumar, Sangeetha Sreekanth	2:37
3.	"Mounangal"	Vijay Yesudas, Aparna Balamurali	3:42
4.	"Cherupunjiri"	Nikhil Mathew, Bijibal	4:21
Total length:			14:31

== Background score ==
Maheshinte Prathikaaram

Film score by Bijibal
- Released: 29 February 2016
- Recorded: 2015
- Genre: Film score
- Length: 19:40
- Label: Muzik 247
- Producer: Bijibal

The original background score for Maheshinte Prathikaaram composed by Bijibal was released on 29 February 2016 for digital download by Muzik 247. It consists of a total of nine tracks.

No.	Title	Length
1.	"Maheshinte Chaachan"	1:47
2.	"Kumbilappam"	1:17
3.	"Pookaalam Kaiveeshi Vidaparanjupoyi"	2:00
4.	"Jimsone Thedi"	3:02
5.	"Jimsy Is Beautiful"	0:53
6.	"Kadayalla Studio"	2:21
7.	"Photography Padippikkan Pattilla"	4:13
8.	"Chettan Superaa"	2:25
9.	"Snap For Manjadi"	1:42
Total length:		19:40
