= Lovely (2025 film) =

Indian Malayalam-language fantasy comedy film

- Theatrical release poster
- Directed by: Dileesh Nair
- Written by: Dileesh Nair
- Produced by: Saranya; Dr. Amar Ramachandran
- Starring: Mathew Thomas; Sivaangi Krishnakumar; Manoj K. Jayan
- Cinematography: Aashiq Abu
- Edited by: Kiran Das
- Music by: Vishnu Vijay; Bijibal
- Production companies: Western Ghats Productions; Neni Entertainments
- Distributed by: OPM cinema Release
- Release date: 16 May 2025
- Running time: 116 minutes
- Country: India
- Language: Malayalam

Lovely is a 2025 Indian Malayalam-language fantasy comedy film written and directed by Dileesh Nair. The film stars Mathew Thomas, Sivaangi Krishnakumar, and Manoj K. Jayan.

This film was released on 16 May 2025 and opened with a mixed-to-negative reviews critics with praise towards the 3D making and direction but criticism for the weak script. The film was a box-office bomb.

== Plot ==
A young man develops an unexpected friendship with a talking housefly. Boney - a young happy man who takes up his late father’s government job until a turn of events take place in his life.

He ends up in remand in the sub-jail for 14 days after a false allegation against him, where he meets his new best friend- ‘eecha’ (housefly in Malayalam). He names it Lovely. He makes a little home for Lovely in his cell in the sub-jail.

He is soon taken out in bail, but he finds himself missing the housefly from sub-jail. He tries different things to go back to the sub-jail, including accepting the false allegation made against him in court. But to his dismay, he fails to go back to the sub-jail.

On the other hand, Lovely who had never been out of the sub-jail before, finds herself missing Boney too. The story ends with Boney and Lovely re-uniting. Boney is seen on the hill with Lovely, talking about his new superpower- ‘to be able to predict everyone’s next move’

== Cast ==
- Mathew Thomas as Boney
- Unnimaya Prasad (motion capture) & Sivaangi Krishnakumar (voice) as Housefly
- Manoj K. Jayan as Magistrate
- Aswathy Manoharan as Grace
- Radhika
- Prasanth Murali as Shinemon
- Baburaj as Simon
- Joemon Jyothir
- Arun Pradeep as Godmon Biju
- Sreejith Ravi as Bombay Shibu
- Jayashankar
- Ashlin
- Arun Ajikumar
- Ganga Meera as Boney's Mother

== Music ==
The music was composed by Vishnu Vijay and Bijibal with lyrics by Suhail Koya.

Track listing
No.	Title	Music	Singer(s)	Length
1.	"Bubble Poomottukal"	Vishnu Vijay	Kapil Kapilan, Vishnu Vijay	3:22
2.	"Craziness"	Vishnu Vijay	K. S. Harisankar, Vishnu Vijay	3:05
3.	"Lovely's Dream"	Vishnu Vijay	Shakthisree Gopalan	2:56
4.	"Intha Idayathile"	Bijibal	G. Sreeram, Soumya Ramakrishnan	0:59
Total length:				10:22

== Reception ==
Gopika I. S. of The Times of India rated the film 2.5/5 stars and wrote, "The screenplay is very shaky and half-baked at best. The dialogues are also all over the place, never quite achieving a natural tone. [...] Lovely might be worth a one-time watch, given that it's experimental at its core, and Aashiq Abu's cinematography makes it aesthetically pleasing." Anandu Suresh of The Indian Express gave it 1.5/5 stars and wrote, "Lovely is, simply put, one of those films where nearly every member of the technical crew has done an excellent job, but their efforts are ultimately wasted due to subpar writing." Vivek Santhosh of Cinema Express gave it 1.5/5 stars and wrote, "A charming premise sinks under the weight of confused storytelling, abrupt emotional shifts, and a script that mistakes randomness for depth".
