= Kadha Paranja Kadha =

- Directed by: Siju Jawahar
- Screenplay by: Siju Jawahar
- Produced by: Basil Abraham; Manoj Kuriakose; Rajesh Raju George; Shibu Kuriakose
- Starring: Siddharth Menon; Tarushi Jha; Shaheen Siddique; Yassar
- Cinematography: Sudheer Surendran
- Edited by: Ranjan Abraham
- Music by: Bijibal
- Production company: Pablo Cinemas
- Distributed by: Collective Frames; Carnival Motion Pictures
- Release date: 9 February 2018
- Running time: 134 minutes
- Country: India
- Language: Malayalam

Kadha Paranja Kadha is a 2018 Indian Malayalam-language film written and directed by Siju Jawahar, and starring Siddharth Menon, Tharushi, Shaheen Siddique, Renji Panicker, and Dileesh Pothan. The film features music composed by Sithara Krishnakumar and Jaison J. Nair. The film was released on 9 February 2018 in theatres and digital platform in 2021 by Baburaj Asariya through his film production & distribution house Collective Frames. It was released on Amazon Prime in the UK and the USA.

== Cast ==
- Santhosh Keezhattoor
- Siddharth Menon as Ebby
- Renji Panicker
- Dileesh Pothan
- Praveena
- Pradeep Kottayam
- Shaheen Siddique
- Tarushi Jha as Jennifer
- Pala Aravindan
- Yassar as Ashraf
- Dr Rajesh Raju George as Psychiatrist

== Reception ==
Vinod Nair of The Times of India gave the film 2.5 out of 5 stars, writing: "The storyline is reasonably good but the audience can't always relate with the lead characters. Perhaps the lead characters could have been entrusted to more experienced actors."

The film was nominated for the Golden Fox Award at the 22nd season of the Calcutta International Cult Film Festival.
