= Rifle Club =

2024 Indian film

- Theatrical release poster
- Directed by: Aashiq Abu
- Written by: Syam Pushkaran; Dileesh Karunakaran; Suhas; Sharfu(uncredited)
- Produced by: Aashiq Abu; Vincent Vadakkan; Vishal Vincent Tony
- Starring: Dileesh Pothan; Anurag Kashyap; Vijayaraghavan; Vani Viswanath; Unnimaya Prasad; Darshana Rajendran; Surabhi Lakshmi; Hanumankind; Vineeth Kumar; Suresh Krishna; Vishnu Agasthya; Ramzan Muhammad
- Cinematography: Aashiq Abu
- Edited by: V. Saajan
- Music by: Rex Vijayan
- Production companies: OPM Cinemas; TRU Stories
- Distributed by: Sree Gokulam Movies (Worldwide); Dream Big Films
- Release date: 19 December 2024
- Running time: 120 minutes
- Country: India
- Language: Malayalam
- Box office: ₹30 crore

Rifle Club is a 2024 Indian Malayalam-language action comedy film directed by Aashiq Abu and written by Syam Pushkaran, Dileesh Karunakaran, and Suhas. The film is produced by Aashiq Abu, Vincent Vadakkan, and Vishal Vincent Tony under the banners of OPM Cinemas and TRU Stories. The film features Dileesh Pothan, Vijayaraghavan, Vani Viswanath, Anurag Kashyap, Suresh Krishna, Vineeth Kumar, Hanumankind, Ramzan Muhammed, Unnimaya Prasad, Darshana Rajendran and Surabhi Lakshmi.

The project was officially announced on 16 March 2024. Principal photography began on 20 March 2024, with filming taking place in Mundakayam, the Rajamahendravaram forest, Thrissur, and Ernakulam. The production was completed on 19 July 2024. The film's music was composed by Rex Vijayan. It marks the acting debut of rapper Hanumankind and the Malayalam debut of Anurag Kashyap.

The film was released on 19 December 2024 and received mixed-to-positive reviews. It was a commercial success at the box office.

== Plot ==
In 1991, Mangalore-based gangster Dayanand Bhare hosts a birthday party for his son Bichu, along with his other son, Bheera. During the celebration, Bichu becomes infatuated with a dancer, Nadiya, and tries to kiss her. Nadiya's partner, Ali, intervenes and strikes Bichu, causing him to fall into a dumpster multiple levels below. Furious, Dayanand sends his men to capture Ali and Nadiya, forcing the couple to flee to Kannur, where they hope to seek refuge with Ali's cousin, Shajahan, an actor preparing for a hunter role in the film Vetamrugam.

Shajahan joins a rifle club in Sulthan Bathery to enhance his method acting. The club is led by Kuzhiveli Lonappan and secretary Avaran, whose father, Kaduvachalil Skariya, was a co-founder. The club functions as an extended family of skilled hunters. Ali and Nadiya eventually arrive at the club and are given shelter. Shajahan and Avaran engage in hunting practice in the forest with other members.

Bheera tracks the couple to the rifle club. Enraged by Bichu's death and his humiliation by club member Ittiyanam, Bheera launches an attack on the club with his gang. The club members defend themselves, killing all the attackers except Bheera and Dayanand's associate, Chittappa. Dr. Lazar, Ittiyanam's ex-husband, offers to treat Bheera's injuries, but he refuses. Dayanand arrives and takes Bheera away, but Bheera succumbs to his wounds. Vowing revenge, Dayanand organizes another assault on the club.

During the attack, Avaran's wife, Sisily, fires a flare to warn him but fails to get his attention. She then sends their dog with a message, which reaches Avaran and Shajahan in the forest just before the dog is killed by a tiger. Avaran and Shajahan return to the club and repel the attackers. Shajahan overcomes his fears and fights alongside the club members.

The confrontation ends with the rifle club confronting Dayanand directly. They ultimately kill him, ensuring the safety of the club and the couple, Ali and Nadiya.

== Cast ==
- Dileesh Pothan as Kaduvachalil Avaran Skaria
- Vani Viswanath as Ittiyanam
- Anurag Kashyap as Dayanand Bare
- Vijayaraghavan as Kuzhiveli Lonappan
- Vineeth Kumar as Shajahan
- Vishnu Agasthya as Godjo Lonappan
- Suresh Krishna as Dr. Lazar
- Hanumankind as Bheera Bare
- Unnimaya Prasad as Sisily Avaran
- Darshana Rajendran as Kaduvachalil Tresa "Kunjumol" Mary Skaria
- Surabhi Lakshmi as Susan
- Ramzan Muhammed as Ali
- Navani Devanand as Nadiya
- Prashant Murali as Fr. Joshi
- Kiran Peethambaran as Rappadi Krishnan
- Bibin Perumpilly as Perumpilly
- Ramu as Contractor Punnoose
- Ponnamma Babu as Shoshanna Punnoose
- Senna Hegde as Chittappa
- Natesh Hegde as Pedro
- Raffi as Adv. Koshi
- Vaishakh Shankar as Paul
- Niyaz Musaliyar as Shanawas
- Jithu Asharef
- Parimal Shais as Bichu Bare
- Sajeev Kumar as Joji
- K. P. A. C. Azeez as Kunnath Kochausep (photo appearance)
- K. P. A. C. Sunny as Kaduvachalil Skariya (photo appearance)

== Production ==
=== Development ===
The film marks the 14th directorial venture of Aashiq Abu. On 16 March 2024, he announced his collaboration with Dileesh Pothan, Anurag Kashyap, and Vijayaraghavan for the project, revealing that the script would be written by Syam Pushkaran, Dileesh Karunakaran and Suhas-Sharfu. The film is produced by Aashiq Abu himself, along with Vincent Vadakkan and Vishal Vincent Tony under the banners of OPM Cinemas and TRU Stories.

The cinematography for Rifle Club will be handled by Aashiq Abu himself. He announced on his social media that he would take on both the direction and cinematography for the film. The film's visuals and pacing are supervised by editor V Saajan.

The movie was originally announced with Dileesh Karunakaran and Suhas-Sharfu as the scriptwriters. Syam Pushkaran joined the writing team after filming had already begun.

=== Casting ===
Dileesh Pothan signed on for Rifle Club with director Aashiq Abu. The team announced that Dileesh Pothan, Anurag Kashyap, Vijayaraghavan, Vani Viswanath, and Hanumankind lead roles, with Vani Viswanath taking the female lead. The film will also feature Vineeth Kumar, Suresh Krishna, Vishnu Agasthya, Darshana Rajendran, Unnimaya Prasad, and Surabhi Lakshmi in key roles. Additionally, the director has revealed that the movie will introduce few new faces to the audience.

=== Filming ===
Filming began on 20 March 2024, with the primary shoot taking place in Mundakayam, Kottayam district, Kerala. Key scenes were filmed in rugged terrains, with additional shoots in Rajamahendravaram, Andhra Pradesh, and Thrissur, Kerala. Some portions of the film were also shot at Kochi Studio.The filming wrapped up by November 2024. Cinematography was handled by Aashiq Abu, and V Saajan was responsible for the editing. The shooting process was kept private, with only a few stills released towards the end of production.

== Music ==
=== Soundtrack ===
Rifle Club

Soundtrack album by Rex Vijayan
- Released: 27 December 2024
- Recorded: 2024
- Studios: 2 Bar Q Chennai, Deepak SR Studio, Legato Records
- Genre: Feature film soundtrack
- Length: 16:27
- Label: Think Music India
- Producer: Rex Vijayan

Rex Vijayan chronology
Neeelavelicham (2023)	Rifle Club (2024)
External audio
- Original Motion Picture Soundtrack, from Spotify

The film's soundtrack was composed, produced and arranged by Rex Vijayan.

Rifle Club (Original Motion Picture Soundtrack)
No.	Title	Lyrics	Singer(s)	Length
1.	"Gandharva Ganam"	Vinayak Sasikumar	Swetha Mohan, Sooraj Santhosh	3:56
2.	"Aalunnu Neeye"	Anwar Ali	Pradeep Kumar, Sithara Krishnakumar	3:42
3.	"Killer On The Loose"	Imbachi	Imbachi	3:02
4.	"Nayattu Prarthana"	Vinayak Sasikumar	Rex Vijayan, Neha Nair	3:47
Total length:				16:27

=== Background score ===
An original soundtrack album composed by Rex Vijayan, Yakzan Gary Pereira and Neha Nair, produced by Rex Vijayan was released on 15 January 2025.

Rifle Club (Original Score)

Film score by Rex Vijayan, Yakzan Gary Pereira, Neha Nair
- Released: 15 January 2025
- Recorded: 2024
- Studios: 2 Bar Q Chennai, Deepak SR Studio, Legato Records
- Genre: Film Score
- Length: 58:59
- Languages: Malayalam, English
- Label: Think Music India
- Producer: Rex Vijayan
External audio
- Original score from Spotify

Rifle Club (Original score)
No.	Title	Artist(s)	Length
1.	"Vintage Vignettes"	Rex Vijayan, 6091	01:59
2.	"Birthday Bash"	Rex Vijayan, 6091	02:34
3.	"Appa - The Big Fella"	Rex Vijayan, Yakzan Gary Pereira, Neha Nair	00:56
4.	"Ali & Nadiya Love Theme"	Rex Vijayan, Yakzan Gary Pereira, Neha Nair	00:21
5.	"Breathtaking Love"	Rex Vijayan, 6091	02:16
6.	"The Aftermath"	Rex Vijayan, 6091	00:50
7.	"Shajahan The Heartthrob"	Rex Vijayan, Yakzan Gary Pereira, Neha Nair	00:35
8.	"Wild Wild Western Ghats"	Rex Vijayan, Arun Suradhaa	02:06
9.	"Rifle Club Theme"	Rex Vijayan	00:42
10.	"The Lover Boy"	Rex Vijayan	00:36
11.	"Club Legacy"	Rex Vijayan	01:01
12.	"Of Guns N Roses"	Rex Vijayan	00:53
13.	"Treasured Guns"	Rex Vijayan	00:38
14.	"Underground Armoury"	Rex Vijayan	00:36
15.	"Double Trap"	Rex Vijayan	01:34
16.	"Ittiyanam - The Boss Lady"	Rex Vijayan	00:28
17.	"Sisisily - Lady Of The Manor"	Rex Vijayan	00:17
18.	"Bheera The Cub"	Rex Vijayan	00:41
19.	"Ladies Call The Shots"	Rex Vijayan	00:52
20.	"Vow To Avenge"	Rex Vijayan, 6091	01:29
21.	"Harsh Truth"	Rex Vijayan, 6091	00:32
22.	"Vengeance"	Rex Vijayan, 6091	00:21
23.	"Game Meat"	Rex Vijayan, 6091	00:37
24.	"Retreat"	Rex Vijayan, 6091	01:23
25.	"The Face Off"	Rex Vijayan, Sujith Valiyaveetil	00:42
26.	"Foreboarding"	Rex Vijayan,Yakzan Gary Pereira, Neha Nair, 6091	00:42
27.	"Lurking In The Shadows"	Rex Vijayan, Yakzan Gary Pereira, Neha Nair	03:48
28.	"A Shot In The Air"	Rex Vijayan, Yakzan Gary Pereira, Neha Nair	01:21
29.	"It's Nothing Just A Scratch"	Rex Vijayan, Yakzan Gary Pereira, Neha Nair	00:51
30.	"Ruby Red"	Rex Vijayan, Yakzan Gary Pereira, Neha Nair	00:24
31.	"Farewell My Son"	Rex Vijayan, Yakzan Gary Pereira, Neha Nair	01:30
32.	"Breakout"	Rex Vijayan, Yakzan Gary Pereira, Neha Nair, Sujith Valiyaveetil	00:28
33.	"Sprint To Safety"	Rex Vijayan, Yakzan Gary Pereira, Neha Nair, Sujith Valiyaveetil	01:51
34.	"A Truce"	Rex Vijayan, Yakzan Gary Pereira, Neha Nair	00:25
35.	"Rifles Against Snipers"	Rex Vijayan, Yakzan Gary Pereira, Neha Nair	02:05
36.	"Vault Blasted"	Rex Vijayan, Yakzan Gary Pereira, Neha Nair	01:04
37.	"Guns Gone Missing"	Rex Vijayan, Yakzan Gary Pereira, Neha Nair	00:59
38.	"Hunters Return"	Rex Vijayan, Yakzan Gary Pereira, Neha Nair	00:19
39.	"Open Fire"	Rex Vijayan, Yakzan Gary Pereira, Neha Nair	00:35
40.	"Epic Entrance"	Rex Vijayan, Yakzan Gary Pereira, Neha Nair	00:34
41.	"An Encounter"	Rex Vijayan, Yakzan Gary Pereira, Neha Nair	01:04
42.	"Back In The Game"	Rex Vijayan, Yakzan Gary Pereira, Neha Nair	01:34
43.	"Power Move"	Rex Vijayan, Yakzan Gary Pereira, Neha Nair, Sujith Valiyaveetil	00:28
44.	"Biker With A Sniper"	Rex Vijayan, Yakzan Gary Pereira, Neha Nair	01:03
45.	"Lynched"	Rex Vijayan, Yakzan Gary Pereira, Neha Nair	01:08
46.	"Ricochet Shot"	Rex Vijayan, Yakzan Gary Pereira, Neha Nair	01:03
47.	"Marching To Enemy Lines"	Rex Vijayan, Yakzan Gary Pereira, Neha Nair	01:29
48.	"Unhinged"	Rex Vijayan, Yakzan Gary Pereira, Neha Nair	01:38
49.	"Wicked Moves"	Rex Vijayan, Yakzan Gary Pereira, Neha Nair	00:42
50.	"Chief In Charge"	Rex Vijayan, Yakzan Gary Pereira, Neha Nair	01:00
51.	"Good Kill"	Rex Vijayan, Yakzan Gary Pereira, Neha Nair	01:53
52.	"The Hunter's Litany"	Rex Vijayan, Yakzan Gary Pereira, Neha Nair	00:53
53.	"Bullets To Spare"	Rex Vijayan, Yakzan Gary Pereira, Neha Nair	00:26
54.	"The Finale"	Rex Vijayan, Yakzan Gary Pereira, Neha Nair	02:25
Total length:			58:59

== Release ==
=== Theatrical ===
The film was released on 19 December 2024.

=== Home media ===
The post-theatrical streaming rights were acquired by Netflix. The film began streaming on the platform from 16 January 2025. The satellite rights of the film are bought by Asianet and premiered on 14 April 2025 on the occasion of Vishu.

== Controversy ==
Raja Azeez, son of the late actor KPAC Azeez, has lodged a complaint against the filmmakers, accusing them of using his father's image in the film without his family's permission. According to Raja, he was approached by someone requesting a photo of his father for a scene in the movie. He agreed and provided the necessary photographs, while also expressing interest in a minor role for himself. However, Raja alleges that the filmmakers went ahead with the movie's release without securing his consent or fulfilling the promise of offering him a role.
