= Aanum Pennum =

2021 anthology film

- Theatrical release poster
- Directed by: Venu; Aashiq Abu; Jay K.
- Written by: Venu; Unni R. Santhosh Echikkanam
- Produced by: C. K. Padma Kumar; M. Dileep Kumar
- Starring: Samyuktha; Joju George; Parvathy Thiruvothu; Asif Ali; Roshan Mathew; Darshana Rajendran
- Narrated by: Sathi Premji
- Cinematography: Venu; Shyju Khalid; Suresh Rajan
- Edited by: Beena Paul; Saiju Sreedharan; Bavan Sreekumar
- Music by: Bijibal; Dawn Vincent
- Production company: Prime Production
- Distributed by: OPM Cinemas
- Release date: 26 March 2021
- Country: India
- Language: Malayalam

Aanum Pennum (transl. Man and Woman) is a 2021 Indian Malayalam-language anthology film featuring three segments directed by Venu, Aashiq Abu and Jay K.

The film explores man-woman relationships against the backdrop of three different timelines with each segment telling a story on romance, betrayal and lust. The anthology features an ensemble cast of Samyukthq, Parvathy Thiruvothu, Asif Ali, Roshan Mathew, Darshana Rajendran, Joju George, Indrajith Sukumaran, Nedumudi Venu, Kaviyoor Ponnamma and Basil Joseph. Bijibal and Dawn Vincent composes the original songs and background score. The film is presented by Rajeev Ravi and produced by C. K. Padma Kumar and M. Dileep Kumar under Prime Production. It marks Nedumudi Venu's last film before his death on 11 October 2021.

== Short films ==
Ep.	Name	Director	Writer	Cast	Based on	Cinematography	Editor
1	Savithri	Jay K.	Santhosh Echikkanam	Joju George, Samyuktha, Indrajith Sukumaran (cameo), Vineeth Vishwam	Santhosh's story	Suresh Rajan	Bavan Sreekumar
2	Rachiyamma	Venu	Venu	Parvathy Thiruvothu, Asif Ali	Uroob's Rachiyamma	Venu	Beena Paul
3	Rani	Aashiq Abu	Unni R.	Roshan Mathew, Darshana Rajendran, Nedumudi Venu, Kaviyoor Ponnamma, Basil Joseph, Benny P. Nayarambalam	Unni R.'s Pennum Cherukkanum	Shyju Khalid	Saiju Sreedharan

== Production ==
Jay K.'s film has completed filming in 2019 while, other films are in different stages of production. Venu's segment which is set in the backdrop of 1950s was shot in Palakkad. Aashiq Abu's segment was filmed during November 2019.

== Music ==
The first song from the film was released on 26 March 2021 by Manorama Music on their YouTube.

Track	Song	Lyricist	Composer	Singer(s)
1	Kadha Padu	B. K. Harinarayanan	Bijibal	Bijibal, Remya Nambeesan

== Release ==
The film was released on 26 March 2021. The film is available for online streaming on Amazon Prime Video, Saina Play and Koode.

== Reception ==
Baradwaj Rangan of Film Companion South wrote "Rani, the third film is the real standout. If you take just the form, ignoring the content for a moment, the way the scenes are written with the dialogue and silence, the way the music kicks in on time and goes out, the unexpected twist with an elderly couple and a Biblical confusion that comes to haunt a man...it doesn't feel like a film about something specific. It feels like snapshots pulled out of people's lives, which is the toughest thing for a filmmaker to do. Rani, with a breathtaking ending, is the only film that worked in this anthology."
