= Tamaar Padaar =

- Theatrical release poster
- Directed by: Dileesh Nair
- Written by: Dileesh Nair
- Produced by: M. Renjith
- Starring: Baburaj; Chemban Vinod Jose
- Narrated by: A. Jayashankar
- Cinematography: Alby
- Edited by: V. Saajan
- Music by: Bijibal
- Production company: Rejaputhra Visual Media
- Distributed by: Rejaputhra Visual Media & Tricolor Entertainment
- Release date: 23 October 2014
- Country: India
- Language: Malayalam

Tamaar Padaar (transl. Bang) is a 2014 Indian Malayalam-language satirical comedy film written and directed by Dileesh Nair (in his directorial debut) and produced by M. Renjith through the company Rejaputhra Visual Media. It stars Baburaj, and Chemban Vinod Jose in lead roles. The soundtrack was composed by Bijibal. The film was released on 23 October 2014 on the occasion of Diwali.

== Plot ==
Jumper Thambi and Tubelight Mani are street performers. Jumper Thambi does stunts like bike Jumping while Tubelight Mani does stunts with Tubelight. Mani is in love with Valsamma, who initially doesn't reciprocate. Thambi and Mani meet each other at a Temple festival and instantly become good friends. They decide to do a stunt together for media visibility. They both tried to squeeze-in through a bicycle tube but ends up getting stuck.

ACP Pouran, an efficient yet overambitious officer, whose main intention is to stand out among his colleagues, sees Thambi and Mani by coincidence. The ACP finds a resemblance between Thambi and a notorious terrorist Khalid Qureshi. He arrests them both and puts them in trial. The ruling party takes undue advantage of the situation by taking all credit, while international anti-terrorist organizations also want them in custody.

ACP Pouran later understands the truth and now wants them released at all cost. He tries the legal way but gets no help from his superior officers. When his efforts become a nuisance, he is transferred on duty to Sabarimala. Eventually, he manages to catch a popular communist leader secretly going on a pilgrimage in Sabarimala, and blackmails him into arranging for the safety of Thambi and Mani. He also secretly bashes another politician, who turned the whole issue into a circus for his own benefit. Eventually, the government and the police fake Thambi and Mani's deaths, to ensure that the world never knows the truth. Pouran then helps them escape.

Sometime later, Mani marries Valsamma and starts a new life somewhere with a new identity. Thambi meanwhile has become a godman and lives happily with popularity and protection. Pouran continues to be ambitious and daring, often acting as a silent avenger of justice in the dark hallways of politics and justice.

== Cast ==
- Prithviraj Sukumaran as ACP Pouran
- Baburaj as Jumper Thambi/Khalid Qureshi
- Chemban Vinod Jose as Tubelight Mani
- Srinda Ashab as Valsamma
- Vijay Babu as Purushan
- Ashvin Mathew as Minister John Katuparamban
- Manju Sunichen as Kanakam
- Shammi Thilakan as Kumaran
- Jojet John
- Anjali Aneesh as Vanitha, Purushan's wife
- Dhaneeh as Iddaly Kallan
- Dileesh Pothan as Siby Karimannoor
- Parvathi T. as Sandya Sumesh
- Jino John

== Production ==
The film marks the directorial debut of screenwriter Dileesh Nair who also wrote the film's screenplay. The film was produced by M. Renjith. The role of Jumper Thampi was earlier offered to Biju Menon. Vijay Babu appears in the flashback scenes as Purushan, Pouran's father. Filming began in Sabarimala in April 2014. It was also filmed in Thiruvananthapuram. The title Tamaar Padaar is an onomatopoeia word in Malayalam that refers to the sound of a blast in comics.

== Reception ==
The film was released on 3 October 2014. It mostly received mixed response from critics.
