= Salt N' Pepper =

2011 Indian romantic comedy film

- Theatrical poster
- Directed by: Aashiq Abu
- Written by: Syam Pushkaran; Dileesh Nair
- Produced by: Sadanandan Rangorath
- Starring: Asif Ali; Lal; Shwetha Menon; Mythili; Baburaj
- Cinematography: Shyju Khalid
- Edited by: V. Saajan
- Music by: Bijibal; Avial
- Production company: Lucsam Creations
- Distributed by: Remya Movies
- Release date: 8 July 2011
- Running time: 118 minutes
- Country: India
- Language: Malayalam
- Budget: ₹2.5 crore (equivalent to ₹5.6 crore or US$600,000 in 2026)

Salt N' Pepper is a 2011 Indian Malayalam-language romantic comedy film directed by Aashiq Abu and produced for Lucsam Creations. The film stars Lal, Asif Ali, Shwetha Menon, and Mythili in the lead roles, while Baburaj and Vijayaraghavan play supporting roles.

The film follows the love stories of two couples. The main characters are: Kalidasan, an archaeologist; Maya, a dubbing artist; Meenakshi, an IELTS student; Manu, a happy-go-lucky management graduate; and Babu, Kalidasan's cook. Food plays an important role in the story, and the tagline of the film is oru dosa undaakkiya kadha ("a story made by dosa", or "a story about making a dosa").

The film has an original score by Bijibal, with three songs composed by Bijibal and the song "Aanakkallan" written and sung by Malayalam rock band Avial. The film was produced by Lucsam Cinema and released by Lal. Principal production started on 3 January 2011 and the film was released in theatres on 8 July 2011 to positive reviews and good initial viewing figures. It is widely regarded as one of the defining movies of the Malayalam New Wave.

Salt N' Pepper's Kannada, Tamil, Telugu, and Hindi remake rights were bought by actor–director Prakash Raj. It was remade in Tamil as Un Samayal Arayil and shot simultaneously in Telugu and Kannada as Ulavacharu Biriyani and Oggarane, respectively. Prakash Raj directed the remakes and appeared in the lead role, playing Lal's character, while Sneha played Shweta Menon's character. Prakash directed a Hindi remake, titled Tadka. In 2019, Baburaj announced the shooting of a sequel titled Black Coffee, written and directed by him, and the movie was released on 19 February 2021.

== Plot ==
Kalidasan works in the state archaeological department in Thiruvananthapuram and is a food lover. His only companion is his cook, Babu. Manu Raghav is Kalidasan's nephew, who comes to stay with him, while looking for a job. Kalidasan has a normal life until he gets a misdialled phone call from Maya, a dubbing artist living with her friend Meenakshi. Maya rings to order a special dosa (named "Thattil Kutty Dosa" in the film) from a restaurant, but gets Kalidasan instead. Their conversations do not go well at first, but a long-distance romance develops due to their common interests—cooking and food. Kalidasan is a born gourmet while Maya is indulging in culinary activities in memory of her deceased mother. Kalidasan starts to let Maya into the secrets of baking with a multilayered cake called "Joan's Rainbow".

Kalidasan and Maya both get the jitters before their first face-to-face meeting, as each becomes conscious of their own physical appearances, and both decide to send younger and better-looking substitutes instead, Manu and Meenakshi. When they meet, neither Manu nor Meenakshi realise that the other person is a substitute, since they introduce themselves as Kalidasan and Maya, respectively. Manu thinks that Kalidasan is actually in love with Meenakshi, while Meenakshi thinks that Maya is in love with Manu. They attempt to sabotage their older counterpart's relationship by telling Kalidasan and Maya that the person they met would be unsuitable for them. Kalidasan and Maya try to forget each other but fail, and they decide to call each other and meet anyway. Manu and Meenakshi, who by this time have started to develop feelings for each other, are dejected upon hearing this and decide to leave the city so that their older counterparts may have a good relationship. However, they discover the truth and each other's real identities during a chance encounter with a common acquaintance, Pooja, at the railway station. Thus, Manu and Meenakshi call Kalidasan and Maya, respectively, and narrate all the incidents unknown to them. Kalidasan and Maya meet, and their relationship begins. It is also shown that Manu and Meenakshi are in a relationship.

== Cast ==
- Lal as Kalathil Parambil Kalidasan, an archaeologist by profession and a food lover
- Asif Ali as Manu Raghav, a carefree youngster Asif Ali says, "It's the one character among all that I have essayed [sic] that's closest to my real-life persona."
- Shwetha Menon as Maya Krishnan, a single woman who works as a dubbing artist, also a "foodie"
- Mythili as Meenakshi, a bubbly young girl
- Baburaj as Babu, professional chef
- Vijayaraghavan as Balakrishnan, Kalidasan's friend and colleague
- Ahmed Sidhique as K. T. Mirash, Manu's friend and Meenakshi's teacher
- Kelu Mooppan as Mooppan, a tribal member whom Kalidasan brings to the city
- Kalpana as Mary, owner of the house where Maya and Meenakshi live
- Ambika Mohan as Itha, a regular customer at Mary's beauty parlour
- Archana Kavi as Pooja Nair, a girl whom Manu meets on a train
- Dileesh Pothan as a film director who tries to woo Maya
- Nandu as Bhaskaran Nair, Pooja's father.
- Shine Tom Chacko as dubbing director
- Munshi Venu as Driving instructor
- Deepa Jayan as Serial actress

== Themes ==
The film centres around food, and Aashiq Abu says: "For a society that is so fond of food, this genre of cinema has not been really explored much in Mollywood [Malayalam cinema], save for a few films. As a foodie, I was inspired to make a film centred on food when I came across this interesting script by Syam Pushkaran and Dileesh Nair."

The type of dosa specifically featured in the film, Thattil Kutty Dosa, is a local speciality. The relationship that develops between Kalidasan and Maya centres around the secrets of baking a multilayered cake known as Joan's Rainbow. According to Abu, "Salt N' Pepper is meant to be a light-hearted entertainer; it's nothing serious—no big plots, no big twists—but plain old common sense and dollops of good ol' fun".

== Production ==
The film was scripted by first-time writers Syam Pushkaran and Dileesh Nair.

Salt N' Pepper is Aashiq Abu's second directorial venture. He was assisted by Abhilash S. Kumar. Technicians such as music director Bijibal, costume designer Sameera Saneesh, and V. Saajan had already collaborated with Aashiq in his first film, Daddy Cool. Cinematographer Shyju Kahlid had previously worked with Sameer Thahir on Daddy Cool. The film was produced by Mumbai-based Sadanandan Rangorath under the banner Name Lucsam Creations. Salt N' Pepper is their first project in the Malayalam film industry. Casting was finalised by December 2010. The original cast included Lal, Asif Ali, and Mythili. Nedumudi Venu was also reported to be cast during the original announcement.

Filming began eight months after the script was submitted and was launched on 5 January 2011 with a blessing held at BTH Sarovaram, Kochi. The ceremony also included film producer Naushad making a dosa onstage. Principal production for the film started on 3 January 2011 and it was shot entirely in Thiruvananthapuram.

== Reception ==
=== Critical reception ===
The film received generally positive reviews, although some critics felt that certain scenes were far from convincing. In the Deccan Chronicle, Keerthy Ramachandran gave the film a three-star rating, writing, "This is a movie which weaves together taste, flavor and love to make an exquisite recipe for good cinema. A must watch for all gourmets, Salt N' Pepper is sweet humour interspersed in a light plot." She also described the film as "one of the most enjoyable films of recent times" and praised the cast performances, stating, "Shwetha Menon has acted brilliantly in the movie, proving that she has more to her than meets the eye. Lal has done complete justice to the role and appears likeable throughout the movie. But, the major share of credit should go to Baburaj – the stereotypical villain in Malayalam cinema. The role of Kalidasan's cook is a milestone in his career. Asif Ali and Mythili appear perfect in their roles. Actor Vijaya Raghavan in a cameo has made a commendable appearance."

Navamy Sudhish of The New Indian Express said, "A delightful addition to GenY fun flicks, Salt N' Pepper is an out-and-out entertainer. It gives two hoots to time-tested tricks and indulges you with a stimulating storyline and unfeigned artistry." He labelled the script "smart", Shyju Khalid's appearances "rich" and "peachy", and Bijibal's background score "superb". Sudhish also praised Abu, saying, "[his] narrative technique is unpretentious and devoid of any jaded gimmickry." Paresh C. Palicha of Rediff.com said, "Director Aashiq Abu has put together the right ingredients in his new film Salt N' Pepper and come up with quite an interesting dish" and that the film will meet the tastes of all who watch it. Veeyen of Nowrunning.com said, "Aashiq Abu and his team adhere to the golden rules of good cooking, and see to it that the griddle is all hot, before they gently spread out a light hearted Dosa story on it." The critic also praised the cast performances and Shyju Kahlid's cinematography. A reviewer from Sify.com said, "Salt N' Pepper may have its own share of shortcomings, but the sincerity with which it has been made is there to be seen in the film. It's a young film which oozes lots of freshness and it is enjoyable for people of all ages, especially if you love your food."

=== Box office ===
The film became a sleeper hit at the box office, completing a run of 100 days at many centres in Kerala. Its 100th-day celebration was held in Dubai on 27 October, with a concert by Avial. Bijibal also performed at the event.

The film collected ₹ 5.1 crore from fifty days of its release at the Kerala box office.

== Soundtrack ==
The soundtrack to the film features three songs composed by Bijibal, two romantic melodies and a folk tune, as well as a song written by Malayalee rock band Avial, "Aanakkallan". It is the band's first release since their self-titled debut album, released in 2008. Avial singer Tony John says that "this song is more or less like a teaser for our second album". A music video, which appears at the end of the film, was also produced. John said: "We had loads of fun shooting the video, which is very kind of like what you would see in a music video rather than a filmy number".

Salt N' Pepper

Soundtrack album by Bijibal
- Released: 5 May 2011
- Genre: Film soundtrack
- Length: 18:20
- Language: Malayalam
- Label: Manorama Music
- Producer: Bijibal

Bijibal chronology
| Arjunan Saakshi (2011) | Salt N' Pepper (2011) | Violin (2011) |

Salt N' Pepper
| No. | Title | Lyrics | Music | Artist(s) | Length |
|---|---|---|---|---|---|
| 1. | "Kaanamullal" | Santhosh Varma | Bijibal | Shreya Ghoshal, Ranjith | 3:43 |
| 2. | "Chembavu" | Rafeeq Ahamed | Bijibal | Pushpavathy | 3:39 |
| 3. | "Premikkumbol" | Rafeeq Ahammed | Bijibal | P. Jayachandran, Neha Nair | 3:14 |
| 4. | "Aanakkallan" | Avial | Avial | Avial | 4:00 |
| 5. | "Kaanamullal(Female)" | Santhosh Varma | Bijibal | Shreya Ghoshal | 3:44 |

== Awards ==
Kerala State Film Awards

- Best Popular Film with Aesthetic value – Sadanandan Rangorath
- Best Actress – Shwetha Menon

Asiavision Awards

- Best Family Movie
- Best Music Director – Bijibal
- Best Lyricist – Rafeeq Ahamed
- Best Second Actress – Shwetha Menon
- Best Comedy Artist – Baburaj
- Special Mention – Mythili

Asianet Film Awards 2011

- Best Star Pair – Asif Ali & Mythili

Vanita Film Awards 2011

- Best Music Director – Bijibal
- Best Comedy Artist – Baburaj
- Best Pair – Lal & Shwetha Menon

Mathrubhumi Film Awards 2011

- Best Path Breaking Movie of the Year

Amrita Film Awards

- Best Film

== Sequel ==
A loose sequel, Black Coffee, was released on 19 February 2021.
