= Maheshinte Prathikaaram =

2016 film by Dileesh Pothan

- Theatrical release poster
- Directed by: Dileesh Pothan
- Written by: Syam Pushkaran
- Produced by: Aashiq Abu
- Starring: Fahadh Faasil; Aparna Balamurali; Anusree; Alencier Ley Lopez; Soubin Shahir
- Cinematography: Shyju Khalid
- Edited by: Saiju Sreedharan
- Music by: Bijibal
- Production company: OPM Dream Mill Cinemas
- Distributed by: OPM Dream Mill Cinemas (India); Tricolor Entertainments (Overseas)
- Release dates: 5 February 2016 (Kerala); 12 February 2016 (rest of India)
- Running time: 120 minutes
- Country: India
- Language: Malayalam
- Budget: ₹3.5 crores
- Box office: ₹17.85 crores

Maheshinte Prathikaaram (transl. Mahesh's Revenge) is a 2016 Indian Malayalam-language comedy drama film directed by Dileesh Pothan (in his directorial debut) and produced by Aashiq Abu. The film stars Fahadh Faasil in the title role alongside a supporting cast including Aparna Balamurali, Anusree, Alencier Ley Lopez and Soubin Shahir. Written by Syam Pushkaran, the story is based on an incident in the life of Thampan Purushan from Thuravoor, Cherthala. Shyju Khalid was the film's cinematographer, and Bijibal composed the music.

Maheshinte Prathikaaram's development began in 2013 when Pothan was working as an associate director for Abu on Idukki Gold, co-written by Syam. Syam suggested a story idea to Pothan based on an incident in his native village. At Pothan's insistence, Syam wrote the screenplay that year and Abu later became interested in producing the film. Production was scheduled to commence from December 2014 after completing the casting process but, scheduling conflicts led to its postponement to August 2015. Principal photography began in early August in Idukki at nearby locations, where it was predominantly filmed. Shooting was completed in late October.

Maheshinte Prathikaaram was released in Kerala on 5 February 2016, in the rest of India on 12 February, and globally on 26 February. The film was a commercial success, grossing ₹17.35 crore (₹173.5 million) at the Kerala box office on a budget of ₹3.50 crore (₹35 million). It received critical acclaim with praise going to the performances of its cast especially that of Fahadh Faasil's as one of his career-best performances, humour, music, cinematography, editing and screenplay. At the 64th National Film Awards, it won the Best Original Screenplay and Best Feature Film in Malayalam, and at the 47th Kerala State Film Awards, it won the Best Original Screenplay and Best Film with Popular Appeal and Aesthetic Value. The film was remade into Tamil as Nimir (2018) and into Telugu as Uma Maheswara Ugra Roopasya (2020). Maheshinte Prathikaram is widely regarded as one of the defining movies of the Malayalam New Wave.

== Plot ==
Mahesh Bhavana is a small-time photographer who lives with his father, Vincent Bhavana. They run the digital photography Bhavana Studio in the Prakash region of Idukki district in Kerala. Next to the studio is a flex-board printing shop owned by Mahesh's good friend, Baby. His assistant Crispin is a Photoshop expert who designs the flex-boards. Mahesh is in a relationship with his high-school sweetheart, Soumya .

Baby becomes involved in a trivial argument with a man in the center of the village. The dispute escalates, but passersby calm them down. However, Crispin belatedly attacks the man who had argued with Baby. The fight restarts, with the man's friend Jimson, joining in as well. Mahesh arrives and tries to calm everyone down, but Jimson, furious at Mahesh's bossy tone, starts a fight with him and beats him up. Vincent eventually breaks up the fight. Humiliated, Mahesh vows to get revenge by beating up Jimson and pledges that he will wear slippers again only after he has done so.

Soumya ends her relationship with Mahesh and marries an NRI nurse leaving Mahesh heartbroken. He then learns about Jimson's whereabouts from Crispin and visits the garage where he works as a welder. There he learns that Jimson has quit and moved to Dubai for work. Despite Baby's advice that he should forget the incident, Mahesh resolves to wait for Jimson's return. In the meantime, he enrolls in a kung fu course.

Jimsy, a young college student, visits the studio to have a glamour photograph taken since she wants to participate in Vanitha's cover competition. Perplexed at the unusual request, Mahesh conducts the photo shoot. However, Jimsy's photograph turns out to be dull and unimpressive, and her disappointment with the result makes Mahesh question his skills as a photographer. Upset, he turns to his father for advice who explains photography as an art to his son. Mahesh goes through his father's photograph collection, understanding their angles and lighting, and gets an idea.

Instead of his familiar still photography, Mahesh secretly photographs Jimsy in motion and sends the best photo to the magazine. Shortly afterward, Jimsy goes to Mahesh's house with the magazine containing her photo. Although she rebukes him for photographing her without permission, she praises the photo. They become interested in each other, and realizing this, Jimsy calls Mahesh to talk about their future. She tells him that she is Jimson's younger sister, but his misgiving is overshadowed by love and he decides to continue their relationship.

Several weeks later, Jimson is fired from his job for slapping his supervisor and is deported back to India. The following day, Mahesh and Baby challenge him to a hand-to-hand combat. After a few minutes of fighting, Mahesh pins down Jimson and Baby declares him the winner. Mahesh visits Jimson in a hospital the next day and introduces himself to his mother in front of Jimsy. He admits his love for Jimsy and asks Jimson if he agrees to the relationship. During the end credits, it is shown that Mahesh and Jimsy are together now.

== Cast ==
- Fahadh Faasil as Mahesh Bhavana
- Soubin Shahir as Crispin
- Aparna Balamurali as Jimsy
- Anusree as Soumya
- Alencier Ley Lopez as Baby
- Lijomol Jose as Soniya
- K. L. Antony Kochi as Vincent Bhavana, Mahesh's father
- Sujith Shankar as Jimson Augustine, Jimsy's brother
- Jaffar Idukki as Kunjumon, Soumya's father
- Achunthanandan as Thahir, village councillor
- Arun Kumar Pavumba as auto driver, jimson's friend
- Vijilesh Karayad as Vijilesh
- Leena Antony as Jimsy's mother
- "Kung-fu" Sajith as Mahesh's karate instructor
- Dileesh Pothan as Eldho, an American Malayali (cameo appearance)
- Unnimaya Prasad as Eldho's wife (cameo appearance)

== Production ==
=== Development ===
Maheshinte Prathikaaram is based on an incident in screenwriter Syam Pushkaran's native village. During the filming of Aashiq Abu's Idukki Gold (2013), Syam discussed it with Abu's associate-director Dileesh Pothan, who decided to make his directorial debut with it. The idea for a film was developed; it was decided to set and shoot it in Idukki, since they believed it was a good location for a story about people living in the countryside. In August 2014, Fahadh Faasil was reported to star in the film, with Abu bankrolling it through his production house OPM Dream Mill Cinemas. It was Fahadh's second film for Abu after 22 Female Kottayam (2012). Bijibal was signed as the film's composer and Shyju Khalid as its cinematographer. Filming was planned to start in the first week of December 2014. Maheshinte Prathikaaram was Syam's first independent screenplay. In September 2014, Fahadh was reported to join the project after completing Anwar Rasheed's Maniyarayile Jinnu. Because of Fahadh's scheduling conflicts, production was postponed until early June 2015. It was postponed again when the actor was unavailable due to a conflict with Naale and Ayal Njanalla. Maheshinte Prathikaaram began production in early August 2015 for a planned Christmas release.

=== Writing ===
The character of Mahesh was based on Kuriyachira Purushan (popularly known as Thampan Purushan), Syam's neighbour in their native Thuravoor, Alappuzha. Purushan was publicly beaten and humiliated when he tried to break up a fight, and vowed to wear his slippers only after he avenged the man who embarrassed him. His "enemy" went to Dubai, and he had to wait three years for revenge. As a child, Syam heard about the incident from Purushan and discussed it with Pothan as an idea for a screenplay. Syam began writing, setting the story in Pothan's native Kottayam; it was later changed to Idukki. He studied Idukki's culture and characteristics in his two-month stay during the filming of Idukki Gold, and found it an ideal backdrop. Syam added a fictional romance to the story. The film paid tribute to Purushan (who died in December 2015 while the film was in post-production) in a title card.

Despite Maheshinte Prathikaaram's title, Pothan intended it to be a comedy: "I enjoy humour with a poignant touch. This was a narrative that had the potential to be a thriller but we wanted that element of realism to shine through". He and Syam worked on the screenplay for nearly three years. With a few assistant directors, they honed it for about three months in Prakash City, a mountain village near Kattappana in Idukki (where the film is set). The screenplay was based on their observations of the village near the kavala (junction), which generated a detailed backstory for each of the film's characters. Pothan took note of the mannerisms of the shopkeepers in the kavala whom he considered a "witness to many of the incidents that unfold in the village, real and reel".

According to Syam, he observed the strengths of both Pothan and Fahadh and incorporated into the screenplay. The screenplay was revised several times between pre-production and filming, with Syam preparing its first draft in mid-2013. In the meanwhile, he completed scripts for three other films. According to the writer, its creation was unhurried; the film was about village life, with which he was familiar (Thampan Purushan, on whom the story is based, was his father's friend). Syam added that the screenplay had "less research but more observation". A revised screenplay was prepared after completing the casting, and it underwent several more revisions as filming progressed. Syam, Pothan and Khalid discussed the screenplay every night after filming. Syam said that there were changes to every scene in the film, based on suggestions by the director and cast.

=== Cast and crew ===
According to Pothan, the film had the "perfect casting, despite the fact that several of them were newcomers". He first discussed the film with Fahadh Faasil during the filming of Iyobinte Pusthakam in 2014, in which the director played a minor role. Fahadh, enthusiastic about the project, agreed to appear in the film after fulfilling his other commitments. Pothan described Mahesh as a simpleton with a multi-layered character and wanted an actor who would provide much finesse and subtlety to the portrayal. He added that Fahadh was chosen for the "natural and spontaneous" actor in him. Pothan and Syam cast Soubin Shahir as Crispin early in the screenwriting process. The director summoned Sujith Shanker, who debuted in Njan Steve Lopez (2015), for a script-briefing section as a possible Jimson. Although Shanker liked the story, he was uncertain whether he would fit in the role; however, Pothan had confidence in him.

Syam's wife Unnimaya was the casting director and also acted and served as an assistant director in the film. She along with Pothan appeared in minor roles—Sarah and Eldho, a couple settled in the United States. In May 2015, Anusree was cast as Soumya, a nurse who is Mahesh's childhood sweetheart. Aparna Balamurali, who had appeared in Oru Second Class Yathra (2015), was encouraged by Syam's wife (who is her university instructor) to audition for the role of Jimsy. Balamurali was briefed about her character only two days before filming began. Fahadh suggested Alencier Ley Lopez, with whom he had worked in Annayum Rasoolum (2013), for Baby's role. Newcomer Lijimol Jose was chosen for the role of Soniyamol after she answered a casting call. Theatrical couple K. L. Antony Kochi and Leena Antony made their film debuts as Vincent Bhavana and Jimsy's mother, respectively. Pothan also hired local people to appear in the film in "whatever clothes they turned up in"; he believed that if he cast only actors, "the reality would have been compromised". The director wanted to "feel each frame of the film, be it the rustic ambiance, the clothes or the accent".

Ajayan Chalissery was Maheshinte Prathikaaram's art director. Chalissery designed the set for Mahesh's Bhavana Studio and nearby buildings, including a footwear shop which was built in a vacant area. "Each and every property used for the movie, from the steel plates used in kitchen to the photos and frames hung on the walls, the windows and doors, everything was intentionally used to reflect a house of Idukki natives", said Ajayan. Designer Sameera Saneesh was in charge of the film's costumes. All clothes worn by the cast were secondhands, bartered from local residents in exchange for new clothes, since Pothan believed that Maheshinte Prathikaaram's details should appear realistic. Martial artist and trainer "Kung-fu" Sajith was the film's stunt coordinator.

=== Filming ===
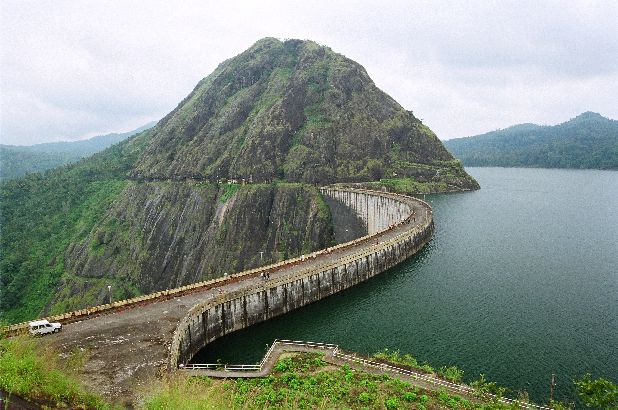
The climactic fight was filmed near the Idukki Dam.

Filming began in early August 2015, during the wet season, in the Idukki district of Kerala. Major portions of the film were shot in Thopramkudy, near Kattappana. In September, while filming in Cheruthoni, Fahadh sustained a leg injury while performing a stunt with co-star Sujith Shanker. Although a two-day rest was advised, he decided to press on because of the tight shooting schedule. The filming in Idukki, which took 45 days, was wrapped up in late October.

There were two fight scenes in the film. For realism, the actors fought without rehearsing. Although the first scene used music and other technical enhancements, Pothan wanted the climactic fight to look more natural: "I felt it would be better to film it without its cinematic nature. To be able to relate to the scene, it had to look natural. Fahadh and Sujith had a tough time while shooting". The scene was filmed in four days on muddy grounds near the Cheruthoni and Idukki Dams. The film's appooppan thadi (milkweeds) were artificial; about 1,000 were made from lightweight materials. In a scene where Crispin cuts them down, most blew upward like real milkweeds and the scene had to be re-shot several times. The film was made on a budget of ₹4.5 crores.

=== Post-production ===
Cellador Productions of Bangalore worked on the film's sound design; Nixon George and Rajeesh K. R. designed its soundscape. Since Maheshinte Prathikaram was set in Prakash City in Idukki, it required natural sounds which blended with the dialogue and music instead of dominating them. George and Rajeesh recorded in all the locations and found it of great help during the final editing process. Creating sound effects for the climactic fight was difficult: "We used a big piece of meat to produce the sound effects of punches and kicks. It took a long time and a lot of trial and error". Editor Saiju Sreedharan was the film's colourist, correcting the colour grading and developing its digital intermediate.

== Themes and analysis ==
Maheshinte Prathikaaram, which uses rain as a metaphor, was filmed during the monsoon. Pothan cited K. G. George's 1982 film, Yavanika, as influencing him to use rain as part of the director's storytelling. The first half of the film was shot in the rain or immediately afterward, when the clouds were gone. Mahesh weeps during a downpour after attending his ex-girlfriend's wedding; the rain becomes a metaphor to "wash away the dreams Mahesh had built, essentially, giving him a new lease of life". It was the film's only use of a rain unit.

According to Sreehari Nair of Rediff.com, Maheshinte Prathikaaram has the key qualities of a great short story; he found it closer to the creative non-fiction style specialised by the writers of Esquire magazine in 1960s in terms of rhythm and pacing. Nair noted strong left-wing ideology in the film due to Pothan's political philosophy, with the director indirectly using the idea of equality inherent in his characters' belief system: "A game one can play on every subsequent viewing of the movie is to note how a major character in one scene had appeared as a minor character in some scene before". Each of the film's characters was unique. Syam later clarified that the film did not reflect his personal or political views.

In an interview for The Hindu, Fahadh called Maheshinte Prathikaaram a "serious comedy". Despite its title, the film differed from earlier Malayalam revenge-centred films. It begins with Mahesh bathing in a pond, humming a popular song from 2000's Narasimham (a cult action film). It also alludes to the doomed character Sethumadhavan's vengeance in Kireedam (1989) and Chenkol (1993). In his review for The Times of India, Sanjith Sidhardhan called the film the "sweetest tale of revenge"; it "is not a regular revenge thriller; it has a heavy dose of rib-tickling comedy that stems from the actions of its rustic characters and their sensibilities".

== Music ==
The film's four-song soundtrack and score were composed by Bijibal, who also sang two songs. Lyrics were by Rafeeq Ahammed and Santhosh Varma; Varma wrote the final song, "Cherupunjiri". Bijibal, Vijay Yesudas, Sudeep Kumar, Sangeetha Sreekanth, Aparna Balamurali and Nikhil Mathew contributed vocals to the soundtrack. The film's songs were released by Muzik 247 on 1 January 2016.

The music was composed after the lyrics were written; Ahammed wrote the song "Idukki" as a poem in one day. According to Bijibal, it was easy to compose "Idukki" because it had such "motivati[ng] lyrics". He originally recorded the song with a small orchestra, singing it himself. The composer later recorded another version with a lush orchestra; however, Pothan thought it lacked the beauty of the original and used the first version in the film. In addition to her role as Jimsy, Balamurali sang "Mounangal" with Yesudas. Balamurali stated that she was made to sing on the sets frequently and opined that it influenced them at a later stage. A song titled "Ethetho" written by M. R. Jayageetha was initially recorded but never included in the film. Later the song was used with Telugu lyrics in Uma Maheswara Ugra Roopasya, Telugu remake of the film. The original version was released in August 2020 on Bijibal's official YouTube channel.

== Release ==
Maheshinte Prathikaaram's release plans were announced in January 2016. The film was released in 67 theatres in Kerala on 5 February. It was released in the rest of India on 12 February, and internationally two weeks later. The film was distributed in India by OPM Dream Mill Cinemas, opening outside Kerala in Bangalore, Mysore, Mangalore, Manipal, Chennai, Coimbatore, Hyderabad and Vizag. On 19 February 2016, it was released in Mumbai, Pune, Gujarat, Delhi and Madhya Pradesh.

The film was released on DVD and VCD by SAINA Video Vision on 10 May 2016. The film's television broadcasting right was purchased by Mazhavil Manorama, it premiered on TV on 14 September 2016, during the festival time of Onam in Kerala.

=== Marketing ===
By March, the film's producers released a number of "dialogue posters" on social networking sites with popular lines from its characters. After Maheshinte Prathikaaram's release, Pothan, Aashiq, Fahadh and Soubin visited theatres across Kerala to analyse audience reaction to the film; Fahadh made a surprise appearance at a Payyanur theatre's ticket counter. In March, the crew (including Aashiq, Fahadh, Jaffer Idukki and Bijibal) spoke with students at the Al Azhar College of Arts and Science in Thodupuzha in conjunction with the Mahatma Gandhi University Art Fest. For Vishu on 14 April, the producers released a three-minute behind-the-scenes video featuring auditions and the filming of several scenes.

== Reception ==
=== Box office ===
After witnessing a low opening in the morning shows at the Kerala box office, the film's earnings picked up from the evening shows due to positive response from the audience. Favourable word of mouth helped the film, with its screen count in Kerala increasing from 67 to 88 in one week. The film performed steadily in Kerala during its third week, earning a total of ₹1 crore (₹10 million) over the weekend. After three weeks, its total earnings exceeded ₹10 crore (₹100 million). By the end of its run, it had earned ₹17.35 crore (₹173.5 million) in Kerala and was the highest-grossing film at the January – June box office. It had a run of over 125 days in some Kerala theatres, and ran for more than 50 days in Chennai.

Maheshinte Prathikaram was the highest earning Malayalam film at the United States box office over its third weekend (11–13 March), grossing $16,819 on 17 screens and outperforming Action Hero Biju and Vettah. It earned a total of $70,238 in three weeks. Earnings dropped to $9,750 over the fourth weekend (18–20 March) from 13 screens. It maintained the top position over its sixth weekend (1–3 April) grossing $5,086 from seven screens for a six-week total of $92,596. It was the highest earning Malayalam film at the United Kingdom-Ireland box office during its second weekend (11–13 March), grossing £5,274 from 29 screens for a two-week total of £32,437. The film earned a total of £35,055 after its fourth weekend in the United Kingdom and Ireland.

=== Critical response ===
S. R. Praveen of The Hindu gave a positive review: "Syam Pushkaran, in writing the revenge story, takes away the usual ingredients of hate and anger, and replaces it with lots of humour, arriving as a torrent in one-liners, in situations and even in the minute gestures of the characters ... Maheshinte Prathikaram provides clean entertainment, treading new paths in that endeavour. If revenge comes like this, let's have more of it". He praised Pothan's direction and Fahadh's performance. Sify also had a positive review: "It's not often that you come across such an intelligent comedy that is extremely funny, thoroughly gripping and brilliantly packaged". The reviewer praised the performances: "One of the best things about this one is the performance of every artiste, both in main roles and also those who are there even in a scene or so". Also praising the screenplay, cinematography, and music, the review concluded: "Maheshinte Prathikaram is one of the finest comedies to have happened in Malayalam during recent years".

Mythily Ramachandran of Gulf News praised the film's humour and performances: "The anger and hatred one often associates with a revenge tale is missing"; humour takes over, and the film "busts the notion that revenge tales must be laden with gore and violence". According to Deepa Gauri of the Khaleej Times, Maheshinte Prathikaram is a boon for a Malayalam cinema with an "identity crisis". She praised the film's screenplay and direction: "Every frame shows the minute detailing, which gives [Maheshinte Prathikaaram] its real heart. Charming you with wit, underlining humour and with characters who behave without any cinematic hangover". Raj Vikram of Metromatinee.com also gave a positive review: "There is not a single scene in the film which appears cooked up ... He [Pothan] must be commended for being sure-footed about what he intended to portray". Vikram praised the performances by Fahadh and the supporting cast, the "magnificent camera" and the "songs which seamlessly and melodiously merge with the narrative", concluding that it "is a movie that is true to itself. It surprises with its all pervading simplicity and makes even revenge look like a stroll in the park".

Anu James of the International Business Times gave the film four out of five stars and called it "a simple movie with the right amount of romance, comedy, action and revenge". Appreciating its casting and performances, James also praised the film's technical aspects: its cinematography, "crisp editing", direction, music, screenplay, costume design and art direction. Litty Simon of Malayala Manorama rated Maheshinte Prathikaram 3.75 out of 5: "Dileesh [Pothan] has managed to give a realistic and emotional drama. Humour blends well with the storyline in a subtle and spontaneous manner [with a] well-crafted script". Simon praised the performances of Fahadh and others in the cast and the film's music and cinematography: "With its simplicity and realistic approach, the two-and-a-half-hour-long movie is refreshing and belongs to the 'neat' entertainer category".

Sanjith Sidhardhan of The Times of India rated the film 3.5 out of 5: "Maheshinte Prathikaaram is a movie that has many feel-good moments and something everybody can relate to. This tale of sweet revenge is a rare genial comedy". He appreciated its casting and screenplay, cinematography, editing and music, praising the performances of Fahadh and other cast members and calling the film "visually appealing". Paresh C. Palicha of Rediff.com gave the film three out of five stars, praising Fahadh's performance and its narrative style: "The plot is driven by characters and their reactions to a particular situation, and there is no solid form of story where we see a growth in characters or logical progression in the story".

== Awards and nominations ==
Award	Date of ceremony	Category	Recipient(s)/Nominee(s)	Result	Ref(s)
Asianet Film Awards	20 January 2017	Critics Award for Best Film	Aashiq Abu	Won	
Asianet Film Awards	20 January 2017	Best Character Actress	Anusree	Won	
Asianet Film Awards	20 January 2017	Best New Face	Aparna Balamurali	Won	
Asiavision Awards	18 November 2016	New Sensation in Acting	Aparna Balamurali	Won	
CPC Cine Awards	19 February 2017	Best Movie	Aashiq Abu	Won	
CPC Cine Awards	19 February 2017	Best Director	Dileesh Pothan	Won	
CPC Cine Awards	19 February 2017	Best Script Writer	Shyam Syam	Won	
CPC Cine Awards	19 February 2017	Best Music Director	Bijibal	Won	
CPC Cine Awards	19 February 2017	Best Cinematographer	Shyju Khalid	Won	
Filmfare Awards South	17 June 2017	Best Film – Malayalam	Maheshinte Prathikaaram	Won	
Filmfare Awards South	17 June 2017	Best Director – Malayalam	Dileesh Pothan	Won	
Filmfare Awards South	17 June 2017	Best Actor – Malayalam	Fahadh Faasil	Nominated	
Filmfare Awards South	17 June 2017	Best Supporting Actor – Malayalam	Alencier Ley Lopez	Nominated	
Filmfare Awards South	17 June 2017	Best Supporting Actress – Malayalam	Aparna Balamurali	Nominated	
Filmfare Awards South	17 June 2017	Best Music Album – Malayalam	Bijibal	Won	
Filmfare Awards South	17 June 2017	Best Lyricist – Malayalam	Rafeeq Ahamed (for "Idukki")	Nominated	
Filmfare Awards South	17 June 2017	Best Male Playback Singer – Malayalam	Bijibal (for "Idukki")	Nominated	
Kerala State Film Awards	10 September 2017	Best Original Screenplay	Syam Pushkaran	Won	
Kerala State Film Awards	10 September 2017	Best Film with Popular Appeal and Aesthetic Value	Aashiq Abu, Dileesh Pothan	Won	
National Film Awards	3 May 2017	Best Original Screenplay	Syam Pushkaran	Won	
National Film Awards	3 May 2017	Best Feature Film in Malayalam	Aashiq Abu, Dileesh Pothan	Won	
North American Film Awards	22 July 2017	Best Movie	Dileesh Pothan	Won	
North American Film Awards	22 July 2017	Best Screenplay	Syam Pushkaran	Won	
North American Film Awards	22 July 2017	New Sensational Heroine	Aparna Balamurali	Won	
North American Film Awards	22 July 2017	Best Comedian	Soubin Shahir	Won	
North American Film Awards	22 July 2017	Best Debut Director	Dileesh Pothan	Won	
North American Film Awards	22 July 2017	Best Music Director	Bijibal	Won	
North American Film Awards	22 July 2017	Best Cinematographer	Shyju Khalid	Won	
Padmarajan Award	8 May 2017	Best Film	Dileesh Pothan, Syam Pushkaran	Won	
South Indian International Movie Awards	30 June 2017	Best Film	Maheshinte Prathikaaram	Nominated	
South Indian International Movie Awards	30 June 2017	Best Actor	Fahadh Faasil	Nominated	
South Indian International Movie Awards	30 June 2017	Best Actor in a Supporting Role (Male)	Alencier Ley Lopez	Nominated	
South Indian International Movie Awards	30 June 2017	Best Actor in a Supporting Role (Female)	Anusree	Nominated	
South Indian International Movie Awards	30 June 2017	Best Actor in a Negative Role	Sujith Shankar	Nominated	
South Indian International Movie Awards	30 June 2017	Best Comedian	Soubin Shahir	Nominated	
South Indian International Movie Awards	30 June 2017	Best Debutant Female	Aparna Balamurali	Nominated	
South Indian International Movie Awards	30 June 2017	Best Debutant director	Dileesh Pothan	Nominated	
South Indian International Movie Awards	30 June 2017	Best Music Director	Bijibal	Won	
South Indian International Movie Awards	30 June 2017	Best Lyricist	Rafeeq Ahamed (for "Idukki")	Nominated	
South Indian International Movie Awards	30 June 2017	Best Playback Singer (Male)	Vijay Yesudas (for "Mounangal")	Nominated	
Vanitha Film Awards	12 February 2017	Best Movie	Aashiq Abu, Dileesh Pothan	Won	
Vanitha Film Awards	12 February 2017	Popular Actress	Anusree	Won	
Vanitha Film Awards	12 February 2017	Best Music Composer	Bijibal	Won	
Vanitha Film Awards	12 February 2017	Best Cinematographer	Shyju Khalid	Won	

== Remakes ==
The film was remade into Tamil as Nimir (2018), directed by Priyadarshan. He stated that he had improvised the screenplay to suit the Tamil speaking audience. The film was also remade into Telugu as Uma Maheswara Ugra Roopasya (2020).
