= Palthu Janwar =

2022 Indian Malayalam-language film

- Theatrical release poster
- Directed by: Sangeeth P. Rajan
- Written by: Vinoy Thomas; Aneesh Anjali
- Produced by: Fahadh Faasil; Dileesh Pothan; Syam Pushkaran
- Starring: Basil Joseph; Johny Antony; Indrans; Dileesh Pothan; Shammi Thilakan; Sruthy Suresh
- Cinematography: Renadive
- Edited by: Kiran Das
- Music by: Justin Varghese
- Production companies: Bhavana Studios; Working Class Hero; Fahadh Faasil and Friends
- Distributed by: Bhavana Release
- Release date: 2 September 2022 (India)
- Country: India
- Language: Malayalam

Palthu Janwar (transl. Domestic Animal) is a 2022 Indian Malayalam-language film directed by debutante Sangeeth P. Rajan starring Basil Joseph in lead role and Indrans, Johny Antony, Dileesh Pothan and Shammy Thilakan in supporting roles. The film is produced by Fahadh Faasil, Dileesh Pothan and Syam Pushkaran under the banner Bhavana Studios. The film was released on 2 September 2022.

== Plot ==
Prasoon, an animator by profession, is forced to take up the government job of a veterinary inspector as a compassionate appointment. It takes him through the fun filled happenings that await him in his work. This movie showcases the relationship between humans and domestic animals.

On the first day of work, Prasoon is accused of being irresponsible by a ward member during a Gramasabha, in order to escape the responsibility of finding money for making a cattle shed of Davis.

The veterinary doctor, Sunil, supports Prasoon in this issue, and they become close. Later, Doctor Sunil calls him about an event of his money chain business, and Prasoon refuses, telling him that it is fraud. The doctor got offended, and they started to have a rivalry.

However, the business flops, Doctor Sunil gets heart attack and leaves the job. The new doctor is managing many veterinary hospitals and visits their place only when he gets the chance. Prasoon now likes the job and takes up the job more seriously.

A police dog come to the village to chase a burglary in the church. Prasoon injects the wrong dosage of medicine by mistake and the dog dies. Now his job is in crisis. He plans to leave the job and the place.

Same time, Davis comes to the hospital quarters for help, as his pregnant cow "Molikkutty" had fallen down on a hill. Prasoon gets the help of his girlfriend Stephy and tries to treat the cow. Many people in the village come to the place and even does black magic rituals for the cow, in the leadership of the priest of the church.

Later, they realize that the cow has drunk lots of booze that was hidden in the hills. Prasoon asks people to get baking soda, and the cow gets better. But now, the cow's amniotic sac has broken, and she is going to deliver the calf. Prasoon remembers the technique from his LI courses, and uses it to help with a cow's pregnancy. This makes him and other people feel good about having him as the LI.

== Cast ==
- Basil Joseph as Prasoon Krishnakumar
- Indrans as Kochu George, Ward Member
- Johny Antony as Davis
- Dileesh Pothan as Kavalakkunnel Achan, Priest
- Shammy Thilakan as Doctor Sunil Isaac
- Sruthy Suresh as Stephy
- Unnimaya Prasad as Prasoon's sister
- Jaya Kurup as Davis's wife
- Athira Harikumar as Davis's daughter
- Thankam Mohan
- Stephy Sunny as Kochu George 's daughter
- Sheena Santhosh as Kochu George's wife
- Rajitha Madhu as Prasoon's mother
- Vijayakumar as Naveen
- Kiran Peethambaran
- Siby Thomas as Dr.Satheeshan
- Joji John
- Vaisakh Shibu as Sabu
- Vinoy Thomas as Panjayathu driver

== Production ==
=== Announcement ===
Basil Joseph announced the film on 8 July 2022 by sharing the first look of the film on social media and he wrote, 'Paalthu Janwar in which I got an opportunity to be the lead actor after Jan.E.Man'. Then on 13 August 2022 a promo song named 'A Little Fashion Show', featuring little Malayalam influencers, was released. The song is written by Suhail Koya and composed by Justin Varghese, and the video was directed by Basil Joseph.

=== Casting ===
The film features Basil Joseph in the lead role as a veterinary inspector who loves animals. Notable supporting roles are played by Indrans, Johny Antony, Dileesh Pothan, Shammy Thilakan, and Sruthy Suresh.

== Soundtrack ==
The music for Palthu Janwar is composed by Justin Varghese with lyrics written by Suhail Koya and Santhosh Varma

Track list
No.	Title	Music	Singer(s)	Length
1.	"Pinchu Paithal"	Justin Varghese	Renuka Arun, Justin Varghese	04:03
2.	"Ambili Ravum"	Justin Varghese	Arun Ashok, Justin Varghese	03:27
3.	"Palthu Fashion Show (Promo)"	Justin Varghese	Tanvi, Drishya, Anil	02:57

== Release ==
=== Theatrical ===
The film's teaser released on 27 August 2022 on YouTube. The film was censored with a clean U certificate from censor board. The film released on theatres on 2 September 2022. The film got slightly positive reviews and was a box office hit.

=== Home media ===
The film was digitally streamed on Disney+ Hotstar from 14 October 2022.
