= Idukki Gold (film) =

2013 Indian film

- First look poster of Idukki Gold
- Directed by: Aashiq Abu
- Written by: Syam Pushkaran; Dileesh Nair
- Based on: Idukki Gold by Santhosh Echikkanam
- Produced by: M. Renjith
- Starring: Maniyanpilla Raju; Prathap Pothen; Babu Antony; Vijayaraghavan; Raveendran
- Cinematography: Shyju Khalid
- Edited by: V. Sajan
- Music by: Bijibal
- Production company: Rejaputhra Visual Media
- Release date: 11 October 2013
- Country: India
- Language: Malayalam

Idukki Gold is a 2013 Indian Malayalam-language stoner drama film directed by Aashiq Abu and written by Syam Pushkaran and Dileesh Nair, based on a short story by Santhosh Echikkanam with the same name. The film stars Raveendran,Maniyanpilla Raju, Prathap Pothen, Babu Antony and Vijayaraghavan . The film was released on 11 October 2013.

== Plot ==
The movie starts with Michael, who resides in the Czech Republic, returns to India to meet up with his old schoolmates Madan, Antony, Ravi and Raman. He puts up an advertisement in the local newspaper. Ravi and Madan who are still in contact with each other, notice Michael's advertisement and decide to meet him. Upon meeting Michael, Ravi, and Madan reminisce about their school days. Eventually they decide to go on a road trip to locate the rest of their friends, Antony and Raman, and visit their school. The journey they embark bring them to a dark episode in their school life

The movie is divided into five parts: "Perilatha Gang", "Neechanum Mlechanum", "Plastic Nirodhikanam", "Cheruthoniyile Bhagath Singh" and "Idukki Gold". The narrative shift between their teenage days and their present lives. Ravi being an easygoing guy became a photographer after graduation with very few clients. Madan had a successful life becoming a planter but was forced to divorce his wife Shyamala as they had no children and was very unhappy. The crew finally finds Antony living a normal quiet life as a restaurant manager. Antony decides to join the trip. They continue their journey to pick up their final member Raman who used to be a core communist. After few hardships they find Raman but in a baffled situation. Raman being a widower with a single son falls in love with one of his co workers Manju but he learns that her marriage is already fixed. On the night of her marriage Raman and Manju elope together with the help of his son and old friends who happened to pass by to pick him up. His friends arrange the marriage and Raman joins the road trip. The flashbacks tells us how the boys used to get drunk, smoke up marijuana and "beedi" and had fun bunking classes and just chilling with their friends.

The title of the movie was obtained from the actual Marijuana known as "Idukki Gold", which these boys had smoked up as teens. They go in search for this so prominent "Idukki Gold " and the movie takes on to a serious note when they a saw a wild elephant and find themselves in a field of Marijuana. But they find out that they are held captive by Behnnan whom these boys had a fight with as kids. Behnnan was a helper boy at an estate near their school. The boys were caught by the Principal for smoking and they thought Behnnan was the one who sold them out. They beat up Behnnan and leave him there half dead. There they are scared that Behnnan will shoot them for blinding him in one of his eye but the plot twists when Behnnan just smiles at them and tells them all he ever wanted to was to be friends with them. The movie ends on a cheerful note as Behnnan sets them free and Madan reunites with Shyamala the crew realizing that it was the friendship who bound them together not the "Idukki Gold".

== Cast ==
- Babu Antony as Antony Gonsalves
  - Anil K Reji as Young Antony
- Prathap Pothen as Michael
  - Fabin Raveendran as Young Michael
- Vijayaraghavan as T.R. Raman
  - Anoop Vikraman as Young Raman
- Raveendran as K.C. Ravi
  - Indian Pallassery as Young Ravi
- Maniyanpilla Raju as Madhan Mohan
  - Shebin Benson as Young Madhan
- Lal as Behnnan
  - Pranoy as Young Behnnan
- Jayashree Sivadhas as Jalaja
- Joy Mathew as John
- Sajitha Madathil as Shyamala
- Praseetha Menon as Manju
- Ravi Vallathol as Sadanandan
- Sasi Kalinga as Dead body Antony
- Arthur Antony as Antony's stepson
- Dileesh Pothan as Mathrubhumi Officer
- Syam Pushkaran (cameo appearance)
- Dileesh Nair (cameo appearance)

== Soundtrack ==
Idukki Gold

Soundtrack album by Bijibal
- Released: 2013
- Recorded: 2013
- Genre: Feature Film Soundtrack
- Length: 11:22
- Language: Malayalam
- Label: Muzik 247
- Producer: Bijibal

Bijibal chronology
Daivathinte Swantham Cleetus (2013)	Idukki Gold (2013)	Punyalan Agarbattis (2013)

The soundtrack of the film features two songs and one theme music composed by Bijibal. All the lyrics are penned by Rafeeq Ahammed. Another version of Manikyachirakulla sung by Bijibal's son Devadutt was also released after the release of the movie.

No.	Title	Artist(s)	Length
1.	"Manikyachirakulla"	Job Kurian
2.	"Vattakulam"	Sreenath Bhasi
3.	"Manikyachirakulla (Bit)"	Master Devan
4.	"Theme Of Idukki Gold"	Bijibal

== Critical reception ==
Pramod Thomas of The New Indian Express stated in his review, "Do not go in with great expectations, and you might savour this film, but if the big names weigh on your mind, then you are most likely to come away a tad disappointed." Sharika C. of The Hindu commented, "Even for all its glitter - stunning visuals, soulful music and stellar performances - the film fails to strike gold." She also pointed out that "Aashiq Abu seems to have borrowed heavily from Quentin Tarantino for the titling, segmenting and visual effects, but hasn't quite managed to get right the punch that characterises the master filmmaker's movies." Veeyen of Nowrunning.com rated the film 2.5/5 and said, "'Idukki Gold' does disseminate a heavy scent that enthralls you, and yet which is never intoxicating enough to leave you blissfully smashed." Sify.com's reviewer gave the verdict as "average" and wrote, "We are ready to accept a movie without a conventional or a hard-hitting storyline, if it is entertaining. But the film never really succeeds beyond a point in that way and Aashiq Abu tries his best by packaging the whole film deliciously."
