= Aashiq Abu =

Indian film director, producer, cinematographer and actor

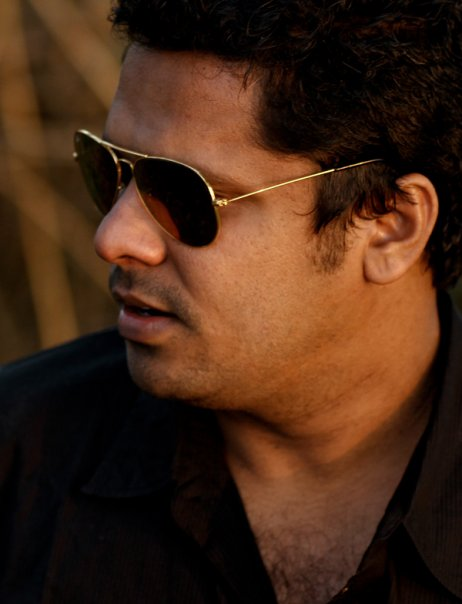
- Born: Aashiq Punnakkaparambil Abu; 12 April 1978 (age 48); Edappally, Kochi, Kerala, India
- Education: Maharaja's College, Ernakulam (BA)
- Occupations: Film director; film producer; cinematographer; actor
- Years active: 2009–present
- Known for: Salt N' Pepper (2011); 22 Female Kottayam (2012); Mayaanadhi (2017); Virus (2019)
- Spouse: Rima Kallingal (m. 2013)
- Parent(s): C. M. Abu (father); Jameela Abu (mother)
- Awards: National Film Award for Best Feature Film in Malayalam (2016, as producer); Kerala State Film Award for Best Director (2012); Padmarajan Award for Best Film (2017)
- Website: aashiqabu (Instagram)

Aashiq Abu (born 12 April 1978) is an Indian film director, producer, cinematographer, and actor working in Malayalam cinema. He is associated with the new generation movement that reshaped Malayalam filmmaking in the early 2010s. He is best known for directing Salt N' Pepper (2011), 22 Female Kottayam (2012), Mayaanadhi (2017), Virus (2019), and Rifle Club (2024). Abu is recognised for his longstanding creative partnerships with screenwriters Syam Pushkaran and Dileesh Nair.

Abu produces and distributes under the banners OPM (Original Pixels in Motion) Cinemas and OPM Dream Mill Cinemas, launched in 2012. As a producer, he is a recipient of the National Film Award for Best Feature Film in Malayalam for Maheshinte Prathikaaram (2016).

== Personal life ==
Aashiq Abu was born in Edappally, Kochi, Kerala to C. M. Abu and Jameela Abu. He completed his schooling at SRV High School, Kochi, and later studied at Maharaja's College, Ernakulam, graduating with a BA degree. During his time at the college, he was elected to the students' union and served as a union member for four consecutive years, an experience he has cited as being formative in shaping his interest in progressive and socially engaged storytelling.

He married actress Rima Kallingal on 1 November 2013, in a simple ceremony at the Kakkanad Registration Office, Kochi. Ahead of the ceremony, the couple donated ₹1 million towards cancer patient welfare at the General Hospital, Ernakulam, and ₹25,000 towards its dietary kitchen.

Aashiq Abu has been part of Anbodu Kochi, a Facebook-based community group that works with local administration to collect and distribute relief materials following natural disasters.

== Film career ==
=== Early career and advertising ===
Before entering the film industry, Abu worked as an advertising filmmaker, directing campaigns for clients including Joyalukkas, Mathrubhumi, Panasonic, Lulu Group, Dubai Gold and Jewellery Group, Media One TV, and Club 7. In 2015, he directed UAE Exchange's advertising campaign starring Jayasurya and Fahadh Faasil.

Abu then worked as an assistant director to Malayalam filmmaker Kamal for approximately five years, including a cameo appearance as a photographer in Kamal's Rappakal (2006). He made his directorial debut with Daddy Cool (2009), starring Mammootty.

=== Breakthrough: Salt N' Pepper and 22 Female Kottayam ===
His second directorial effort, Salt N' Pepper (2011), written by Syam Pushkaran and Dileesh Nair, was a commercial success, completing runs of 100 days at many Kerala centres. Abu credited social media, particularly Facebook, with helping the film reach audiences in districts where it initially had no theatrical presence — becoming one of the earliest Malayalam films to use digital platforms as a primary promotional tool. The film won the Kerala State Film Award for Best Popular Film. Its remake rights in Tamil, Telugu, and Hindi were acquired by actor-director Prakash Raj.

In 2012, Abu directed 22 Female Kottayam, a revenge drama written by Pushkaran and Nair and starring Rima Kallingal and Fahadh Faasil, which established him as a prominent new-generation filmmaker. The film won Rima Kallingal the Kerala State Film Award for Best Actress and the Filmfare Award for Best Actress – Malayalam, and earned Abu the Mohan Raghavan Award for Best Director and the Kerala State Film Award for Best Director.

Also in 2012, Abu directed Da Thadiya, and in 2013, contributed the segment Gauri to the anthology film Anchu Sundharikal and directed Idukki Gold. In 2014, he directed Gangster, starring Mammootty, which he also co-produced; he later acknowledged the film did not meet expectations, citing it as a lesson in the dangers of unfocused filmmaking. In 2015, he directed Rani Padmini, featuring Manju Warrier and Rima Kallingal.

=== OPM Cinemas and producing ===
Abu launched OPM (Original Pixels in Motion) Cinemas in 2012 as a production and distribution company, co-owned with Rima Kallingal. Through OPM, Abu produced Dileesh Pothan's directorial debut Maheshinte Prathikaaram (2016), which won the National Film Award for Best Feature Film in Malayalam at the 64th National Film Awards and the Kerala State Film Award for Best Film with Popular Appeal and Aesthetic Value. Other notable OPM productions include Ee.Ma.Yau (2018), Halal Love Story (2020), Aarkkariyam (2021), and Bheemante Vazhi (2021).

=== Mayaanadhi (2017) ===
Abu's 2017 release Mayaanadhi, written by Pushkaran and Nair and starring Tovino Thomas and Aishwarya Lekshmi, marked a departure from his earlier films into romantic thriller territory. It received widespread critical acclaim and was included in The Hindu's list of the top 25 Malayalam films of the decade. The film won Abu the Padmarajan Award for Best Film, shared with Pushkaran and Nair.

=== Virus (2019) ===
On 7 June 2019, Abu released Virus, a medical thriller he co-produced and directed, based on the 2018 Nipah virus outbreak in Kerala. Written by Muhsin Parari, Suhas, and Sharfu, and featuring an ensemble cast including Kunchacko Boban, Tovino Thomas, Parvathy Thiruvothu, Revathi, Rima Kallingal, Indrajith Sukumaran, and Asif Ali, the film was both a critical and commercial success. The Times of India rated the film 3.5 out of 5 stars, and it was included in The Hindu's top 25 Malayalam films of the decade.

=== Later work ===
In 2021, Abu directed the anthology segment Rani in Aanum Pennum and produced Aarkkariyam and Bheemante Vazhi. In 2022 he directed and produced Naaradan, and in 2023 Neelavelicham, an adaptation of Vaikom Muhammad Basheer's work, which he also produced.

His 14th directorial venture, Rifle Club (2024), an action comedy written by Pushkaran, Dileesh Karunakaran, and Suhas, marked his debut as cinematographer on a film he also directed. The film, produced under OPM Cinemas and TRU Stories, stars Dileesh Pothan, Vijayaraghavan, Vani Viswanath, Anurag Kashyap (in his Malayalam acting debut), and rapper Hanumankind (in his acting debut), set against the backdrop of the Western Ghats. It received mixed-to-positive reviews and grossed approximately ₹27 crore worldwide within its first three weeks of release before streaming on Netflix from January 2025.

In 2025, Abu served as cinematographer on Lovely, a 3D fantasy film directed by Dileesh Karunakaran and starring Mathew Thomas.

== Industry advocacy ==
Abu has been a vocal supporter of the Women in Cinema Collective (WCC) since its formation in 2017. When the Association of Malayalam Movie Artistes (AMMA) reinstated actor Dileep — accused in the 2017 actress assault case — Abu publicly expressed support for WCC members who opposed the decision, and described his wife Rima Kallingal's subsequent resignation from AMMA as "a progressive and historical move".

Following the release of the Justice Hema Committee report in August 2024, which documented widespread sexual harassment in the Malayalam film industry, Abu resigned from the Film Employees Federation of Kerala (FEFKA) Directors' Union on 30 August 2024, citing its leadership's delayed and inadequate response to the report. He also called for the removal of FEFKA General Secretary B. Unnikrishnan from a government-constituted film policy committee, citing a Competition Commission of India ruling that had penalised Unnikrishnan for anti-competitive practices.

In September 2024, Abu was among the signatories of a vision note proposing the formation of a new industry body, the Progressive Filmmakers' Association, alongside Anjali Menon, Rajeev Ravi, Rima Kallingal, and producer Bineesh Chandra. The proposed organisation aims to modernise the industry's legal frameworks, champion workers' rights, and promote gender equality and social justice. Director Lijo Jose Pellissery, who was initially named in reports as a co-founder, subsequently clarified that while he supported the concept, he was not formally part of the association at its inception.

== Filmography ==
Key
†	Denotes films that have not yet been released

=== As director/producer ===
Year	Film	Director	Producer	Notes
2009	Daddy Cool	Yes		Directorial debut
2011	Salt N' Pepper	Yes		
2012	22 Female Kottayam	Yes		
2012	Da Thadiya	Yes		
2013	Anchu Sundharikal	Yes		Anthology (Segment: Gauri)
2013	Idukki Gold	Yes		
2014	Gangster	Yes	Yes	
2015	Rani Padmini	Yes		
2016	Maheshinte Prathikaaram		Yes	
2017	Mayaanadhi	Yes	Yes	
2018	Ee.Ma.Yau		Yes	
2019	Virus	Yes	Yes	
2020	Halal Love Story		Yes	
2021	Aarkkariyam		Yes	
2021	Aanum Pennum	Yes		Anthology (Segment: Rani)
2021	Bheemante Vazhi		Yes	
2022	Naaradan	Yes	Yes	
2023	Neelavelicham	Yes	Yes	Adaptation of Vaikom Muhammad Basheer's story
2024	Rifle Club	Yes	Yes	Also cinematographer
TBA	Aja Sundari		Yes	Also cinematographer

=== As actor ===
Year	Film	Role	Notes
2006	Rappakal	Photographer	Cameo; then assistant director on the film
2012	Theevram	Himself	Cameo
2013	Annayum Rasoolum	Hyder	
2014	Iyobinte Pusthakam	P. J. Antony	
2017	Parava	Police Sub-Inspector	
2020	Trance		
2022	C/o 56APO	Mukhlis Azad	
2023	2018	Party member	

=== As cinematographer ===
Year	Title	Notes
2024	Rifle Club	Also director and producer; cinematography debut
2025	Lovely	3D film directed by Dileesh Karunakaran
TBA	Aja Sundari	Directed by Manu Antony

== Awards ==
Year	Film	Award	Category	Result	Notes
2011	Salt N' Pepper	Kerala State Film Awards	Best Popular Film	Won	
2012	22 Female Kottayam	Mohan Raghavan Award	Best Director	Won	
2012	22 Female Kottayam	Kerala State Film Awards	Best Director	Won	
2016	Maheshinte Prathikaaram	64th National Film Awards	Best Feature Film in Malayalam	Won	Shared with Dileesh Pothan
2016	Maheshinte Prathikaaram	Kerala State Film Awards	Best Film with Popular Appeal and Aesthetic Value	Won	Shared with Dileesh Pothan
2016	Maheshinte Prathikaaram	Filmfare Award for Best Film – Malayalam	Best Film	Won	
2016	Maheshinte Prathikaaram	CPC Cine Awards	Best Film	Won	
2016	Maheshinte Prathikaaram	Vanitha Film Awards	Best Film	Won	Shared with Dileesh Pothan
2016	Maheshinte Prathikaaram	Asianet Film Awards	Critics Award for Best Film	Won	
2017	Mayaanadhi	Padmarajan Award	Best Film	Won	Shared with Syam Pushkaran and Dileesh Nair
2019	Virus	Jagaran Film Festival	Best Indian Feature Film	Won	
2019	Virus	Critic's Choice Film Awards	Best Director	Won	
2019	Virus	CPC Cine Awards	Best Director	Won	
