= 9 KK Road =

2010 Malayalam mystery film

- Directed by: Simon Kuruvila
- Written by: Kaloor Dennis
- Story by: C. K. Sasi
- Produced by: Simon Kuruvila
- Starring: Babu Antony; Vijayaraghavan; Nishanth Sagar
- Cinematography: Venugopal
- Edited by: P. C. Mohanan
- Music by: S. P. Venkatesh
- Release date: 27 August 2010
- Country: India
- Language: Malayalam

9 KK Road is a 2010 Malayalam mystery film directed by Simon Kuruvila under the banner of Sun Pictures. The film featured Babu Antony, Vijayaraghavan and Nishanth Sagar in the lead roles. Several major political leaders from Kerala made special appearances in the film.

== Plot ==
The story begins with the discovery of four dead bodies in a deserted quarry. The Chief Minister gets involved and appoints a police officer named Devdas to investigate the case. Initially, Devdas is accompanied by an aide who walks out on some pretext. Then Devdas is joined by Noushad and the duo gets brisk in their investigation. Devdas is one man who is known to get into the cracks of any issue until justice is ensured. Whether succeeds in his mission or not forms the rest of the story.

== Cast ==
- Babu Antony as Devdas Adiyodi
- C. K. Padmanabhan as Chief Minister.C.K.Padmanabhan
- P. C. George as P.C.George Opposition Leader
- T. N. Prathapan as Prathapan
- M. K. Muneer
- V.N. Vasavan as V.N Vasavan
- Vijayaraghavan as Mathayi/Fa.James
- Shammi Thilakan as Noushad
- Suvarna Mathew as Mollykutty
- Mala Aravindan as S.I. Mathukkutty
- Nishanth Sagar as Unnikrishnan
- Sadiq as Mukundan Menon
- Abu Salim as Iykkara Warkki
- Shamna Kasim as Rose Mary
- Kulappulli Leela
- Ayyappa Baiju
- Prashant
