= Da Thadiya =

- Theatrical Poster
- Directed by: Aashiq Abu
- Written by: Syam Pushkaran; Abhilash S. Kumar; Dileesh Nair
- Produced by: Anto Joseph
- Starring: Sekhar Menon; Sreenath Bhasi; Nivin Pauly; Ann Augustine
- Cinematography: Shyju Khalid
- Edited by: V. Saajan; Bavan Sreekumar
- Music by: Bijibal
- Production company: Anto Joseph Film Company
- Release date: 21 December 2012
- Running time: 114 mins
- Country: India
- Language: Malayalam
- Box office: ₹4.96 crores

Da Thadiya (transl. Hey Fatso) is a 2012 Malayalam romantic comedy film directed by Aashiq Abu starring Sekhar Menon in the lead role along with Sreenath Bhasi, Nivin Pauly, and Ann Augustine in the supporting roles. It was produced by Anto Joseph in association with OPM cinema. DJ Sekhar Menon who had worked as the same in around 500 stages makes his film debut as an actor.

The film was released on 21 December 2012 with mixed to positive reviews from critics and audience.

== Plot ==
The film tells the love story of an obese youth named Luke John Prakash. His close pal is his cousin, Sunny, a video jockey. Luke comes from a wealthy family and his grandfather, Prakash, was once mayor of Kochi and formed his own political party. Since childhood, Luke was in love with another obese girl named Ann Mary Thadikkaran, whose parents are working in an insurance company. One day, Ann Mary's parents get a transfer to Ernakulam and she along with her parents shifts there, leaving Luke heartbroken.

Many years later, Ann Mary comes back to meet Luke at his house and surprisingly she has lost weight. One day, Ann Mary takes Luke to a restaurant. He falls and breaks the chair. Realizing she is not so fond of his obesity, Luke embarks on Vaidyar's Clinic, an Ayurvedic centre run by Rahul Vaidyar to lose weight. One day, Luke escapes from the Ashram to meet Ann Mary on Christmas Eve. There he is shocked to realize that Ann Mary is not in love with him at all. Luke finds out through Rahul, who came for the Christmas Dinner with Ann Mary, that she is the marketing head of Vaidyar's Clinic and that she is in love with him and insults him. Rahul does a big special punch on Luke, which brings him to the ground. Rahul insults his figure, and says that he is "just a mere machine that produces feces". Luke feels he is good for nothing. However, his grandmother, Knight Rider, motivates him by telling fat people are broad-minded and that Prakash who was also fat was the mayor of Kochi and had achieved much. In a dream, Luke sees Prakash saying that generations are necessary to accomplish the unfinished tasks of their forefathers. Inspired by this, Luke joins his father's political party Prakash Congress and finally becomes the mayor of Kochi. Ann Mary's father Joshua comes to meet Luke in the Mayor's office. He tells Luke that Ann Mary is very upset after the incident that happened in their house and she wants to meet him. Ann Mary says that Rahul is a corrupt person and he is making money by decreasing the self-esteem of many people through advertisements and posters and he is engaged to a girl named Sowmya. She says that god punished her for insulting Luke. Luke raides Rahul's business forcing Rahul to go into hiding. He then finds that Rahul is hiding at Vaidyar's Clinic. Luke dresses up as Santa Claus, overpowers Rahul, and does a big special punch on his stomach, thus taking his revenge for beating him. Luke leaves after warning him to stop his business.

The story comes back to the present as Luke is waiting for Ann Mary on the beach. Ann Mary proposes to Luke. But to everyone's surprise, Luke rejects her proposal telling her that he is not her Superman. He also thanks her for teaching him that it is better to live for many than to live for one.

== Cast ==
- Sekhar Menon as Mayor Luke John Prakash
  - Jonathan Abraham as young Luke
- Nivin Pauly as Rahul Vaidyar, The Main Antagonist
- Sreenath Bhasi as Sunny Jose Prakash
- Ann Augustine as Ann Mary Thadikkaran
- Arundathi Nag as Knight Rider, Grandmother of Luke & Sunny
- Maniyanpilla Raju as John Prakash
- Edavela Babu as Jose Prakash
- Vinay Forrt as Shanthanu,the secondary antagonist
- Minu Muneer as Minu
- N. L. Balakrishnan as Prakashan, Grandfather of Luke & Sunny
- Jins Varghese as Anish Naduvilethu (main TV Reporter)
- RJ Renu (voice-over)
- Jayaraj Warrier as Dasan, former mayor of Kochi
- Basil Kothamangalam as Luke's friend
- Kunchan as Joshua Thadikkaran
- Thesni Khan as Rani Thadikkaran
- Gayathri as Rosemol, Luke's mother
- V K Sreeraman as Hajiyar
- Anoop Sankar
- Soubin Shahir
- Shine Tom Chacko
- Sushin Shyam
- Gopu Kesav
- Kozhikode Narayanan Nair as Sudheer Babu/Padmanabhan Vaidyar

== Soundtrack ==
The film features a score and soundtrack composed by Bijibal.

Da Thadiya

Soundtrack album by Bijibal
- Released: 2 December 2012
- Genre: Feature film soundtrack
- Length: 13:09
- Language: Malayalam
- Label: Muzik 247
- Producer: Bijibal

Bijibal chronology
| Jawan of Vellimala (2012) | Da Thadiya (2012) | Isaac Newton S/O Philipose (2013) |

List of songs
| No. | Title | Lyrics | Singer(s) | Length |
|---|---|---|---|---|
| 1. | "Enthanu Bhai" | R Venugopal | Rex Vijayan, Bijibal, Jayaram Ranjith | 3:11 |
| 2. | "Mele Mohavanam" | R Venugopal | Najim Arshad, Shahabaz Aman | 4:34 |
| 3. | "My Love" | Sreenath Bhasi | Sreenath Bhasi | 2:41 |
| 4. | "Rajave Nee Venam" | Vayalar Sarath Chandra Varma | Jayaram Ranjith, Desmond | 2:43 |
| Total length: | | | | 13:09 |

The song "Enthanu Bhai" which was officially released in YouTube in November was a tremendous success and registered 4 lakh hits on the Internet within a month of its release. There has been allegations that the song was inspired by Sneha Khanwalkar's songs "Yere..." and "tung tung". Aashiq Abu is not perturbed by these allegations. "I prefer not to respond to such allegations. I want the listeners to decide for themselves. Our song has been electronically created for the film, while 'Yere...' has original sounds," he says.

== Critical reception ==
Rediff gave the movie 3/5 stars, stating the film shows "If your goal is the common good of the people then you can achieve unprecedented success" and that "The message that slimming clinics are mostly run by quacks who wish to cash in on the vulnerability of fat people does not get diluted in the fun and frolics."

Veeyen at nowrunning.com gave the movie 3/5 stars.
