= Syam Pushkaran =

Indian scriptwriter (born 1984)

Shyam Pushkaran
- Born: 6 September 1984 (age 42); Cherthala, Kerala, India
- Occupations: Screenwriter; film producer
- Years active: 2011–present
- Organisation(s): Working Class Hero; Bhavana Studios
- Spouse: Unnimaya Prasad (m. 2012)
- Awards: National Film Award for Best Screenplay; Kerala State Film Award for Best Screenplay

Syam Pushkaran (born 6 September 1984) is an Indian scriptwriter who works in Malayalam cinema. He is known for his collaborations with directors Aashiq Abu and Dileesh Pothan. He made his debut with Salt N' Pepper (2011), co-written with Dileesh Nair. He has written screenplays for popular films such as 22 Female Kottayam (2012), Da Thadiya (2012), Idukki Gold (2013), Iyobinte Pusthakam (2014), Rani Padmini (2015), Maheshinte Prathikaaram (2016), Mayaanadhi (2017), and Kumbalangi Nights (2019), and Joji (2021). He also served as co-director and wrote the dialogues for Thondimuthalum Driksakshiyum (2017). Syam won the National Film Award for Best Screenplay for Maheshinte Prathikaaram at the 64th National Film Awards (2016).

== Personal life ==
He is married to Unnimaya Prasad from 2012.

== Film career ==
Syam Pushkaran penned the script for Salt N' Pepper along with Dileesh Nair. In 2012, he wrote the script for Da Thadiya (2012); another film directed by Aashiq Abu, along with Dileesh Nair and Abhilash S Kumar. He wrote Sethulakshmi (Segment) in the anthology film 5 Sundarikal. He was also the writer for another Aashiq Abu film Idukki Gold (2013).

== Filmography ==
Key
†	Denotes films that have not yet been released

Year	Title	Role	Director	Notes
2011	Salt N' Pepper	Co-written with Dileesh Nair	Aashiq Abu	
2012	22 Female Kottayam	Co-written with Abilash S. Kumar	Aashiq Abu	
2012	Da Thadiya	Co-written with Dileesh Nair and Abhilash S Kumar	Aashiq Abu	
2013	5 Sundarikal	For segment Sethulakshmi, co-written with Muneer Ali	Shyju Khalid	
2013	Idukki Gold	Co-written with Dileesh Nair	Aashiq Abu	
2014	Iyobinte Pusthakam	Co-written with Gopan Chithambaran	Amal Neerad	
2015	Rani Padmini	Co-written with Ravisankar	Aashiq Abu	
2016	Maheshinte Prathikaaram	Screenwriter	Dileesh Pothan	
2017	Thondimuthalum Driksakshiyum	Creative Director, Dialogues	Dileesh Pothan	
2017	Mayanadhi	Co-written with Dileesh Nair	Aashiq Abu	
2019	Kumbalangi Nights	Writer and Co-producer	Madhu C Narayanan	
2021	Joji	Writer and Co-producer	Dileesh Pothan	
2022	Palthu Janwar	Co-producer	Sangeeth P. Rajan	
2023	Thankam	Writer and Co-producer	Saheedh Arafath	
2024	Premalu	Acted as Pambavasan, Co-producer	Girish A. D.	
2024	Rifle Club	Co-written with Dileesh Karunakaran, Sharfu & Suhas	Aashiq Abu	
2026	Bethlehem Kudumba Unit	Co-producer	Girish A. D.	
TBA	Nedumkandam Miracle †	Writer and Co-producer	Dileesh Pothan	
TBA	KH237 †	Co-written with Kamal Haasan	Anbariv	

== Awards ==
Year	Film	Award	Category	Notes
2016	Maheshinte Prathikaaram	National Film Awards	Best Original Screenplay	
2016	Maheshinte Prathikaaram	Kerala State Film Awards	Best Original Screenplay	
2016	Maheshinte Prathikaaram	North American Film Awards	Best Screenplay	
2016	Maheshinte Prathikaaram	Padmarajan Award	Best Film	Shared with Dileesh Pothan
2016	Maheshinte Prathikaaram	CPC Cine Awards	Best Screenplay	
2017	Mayanadi	Padmarajan Award	Best Film	Shared with Aashiq Abu and Dileesh Nair
2017	Mayanadi	Movie Street Film Awards	Best Screenplay	Shared with Dileesh Nair
2019	Kumbalangi Nights	Vanitha Film Awards	Best Screenplay	
2019	Kumbalangi Nights	Movie Street Film Awards	Best Screenplay	
2019	Kumbalangi Nights	Critic's Choice Film Awards (Malayalam)	Best Screenplay	
2019	Kumbalangi Nights	CPC Cine Awards	Best Screenplay	
2021	Joji	Kerala State Film Award	Best Adapted Screenplay	
