= Idukki Gold =

Strain of cannabis

Idukki Gold or Kerala Gold (also known as Mahadevan or Neela Chadayan) is the name given to a cannabis strain originating in Idukki in Kerala state of southern India. It is internationally renowned as one of the finest cannabis strains in Asia.

== History ==
The strain became popular during the '80s when various strains of cannabis landed in the area of Idukki in Kerala. The climate of the Western Ghats was ideal and the strain soon started spreading. Later, the strain received the name Idukki Gold. Known as Neelachadayan (blue locks) or Neelam in the native tongue. The strain was cultivated and first sold in various parts Kerala and Tamil Nadu. However, it soon found its way all the way to north India and many other countries.

== Extinction ==
Throughout the years, there has been a gradual decline in its production. This is because of the continuous depletion of forests in that region due to rise in population and constant interference by law enforcement of Kerala and Tamil Nadu as the region is near to the border of both the states. Currently, the plantation occurs along the Andhra-Odisha border, an area controlled by Naxalism. However, the quality of this strain is much inferior.
