= Dileesh Nair =

Indian film director and screenwriter (born 1981)

- Born: 23 July 1981 (age 45); Manakkad, Kerala, India
- Occupations: Scriptwriter; film actor; film director
- Years active: 2004–present
- Spouse: Saranya Nair
- Children: 2
- Parents: Karunakaran Nair; Malathy

Dileesh Nair (born 23 July 1981) is an Indian film director and screenwriter who works in Malayalam cinema. He started out as a 2D animator. He made his script writing debut with Salt N' Pepper (2011) along with Syam Pushkaran. He debuted as film director with Tamaar Padaar (2014).

== Personal life ==
Dileesh Nair was born in Thodupuzha, Kerala. He worked as a 2D animator for clients in Australia and the Middle East based out of Kochi.

== Film career ==
Dileesh Nair penned the script for Salt N' Pepper with his friend Syam Pushkaran. Salt N’Pepper’s Telugu, Tamil and Hindi remake rights have been bought by actor-film director Prakash Raj. In 2012, he wrote the script for Da Thadiya (2012); another film directed by Aashiq Abu; along with Syam Pushkaran and Abhilash S Kumar. He also wrote script for the movie Idukki Gold (film) (2013). He has also appeared in cameo roles in films such as 22 Female Kottayam, Da Thadiya, Idiots.

He made his directorial debut with Tamaar Padaar starring Prithviraj Sukumaran, Baburaj, Chemban Vinod Jose and Srinda Ashab in pivotal roles. The film received a mixed response from the audience and critics.

Originally credited as Dileesh Nair, he later adopted the name Dileesh Karunakaran.

== Filmography ==
=== As director ===
Year	Title	Notes
2014	Tamaar Padaar	Also writer
2025	Lovely	

=== As script writer ===
Year	Title	Notes
2011	Salt N' Pepper	Co-written with Syam Pushkaran
2012	Da Thadiya	Co-written with Syam Pushkaran & Abhilash S Kumar
2013	Idukki Gold	Co-written with Syam Pushkaran and Santhosh Echikkanam
2017	Mayaanadhi	Co-written with Syam Pushkaran
2024	Rifle Club	Co-written with Syam Pushkaran and Suhas-Sharfu

=== As actor ===
Year	Film	Role	Ref.
2012	22 Female Kottayam	Cameo appearance	
2012	Idiots	Cameo appearance	
2012	Da Thadiya	Gligesh	
2019	Virus	Shanthan Vaidyar	
2020	Anjaam Pathiraa	Cocaine Shameer	
2022	Naaradan	Kuttettan	
2023	Pulimada	CPO Chandrabos	

== Awards ==
Year	Film	Award	Category	Notes
2017	Mayaanadhi	Padmarajan Award	Best Film	Shared with Aashiq Abu and Syam Pushkaran
2017	Mayaanadhi	Movie Street Film Awards	Best Screenplay	Shared with Syam Pushkaran
2017	Mayaanadhi	Vanitha Film Awards	Best Screenplay	Shared with Syam Pushkaran
2017	Mayaanadhi	North American Film Awards	Best Screenplay	Shared with Syam Pushkaran
