= Bijibal =

Indian music composer and playback singer

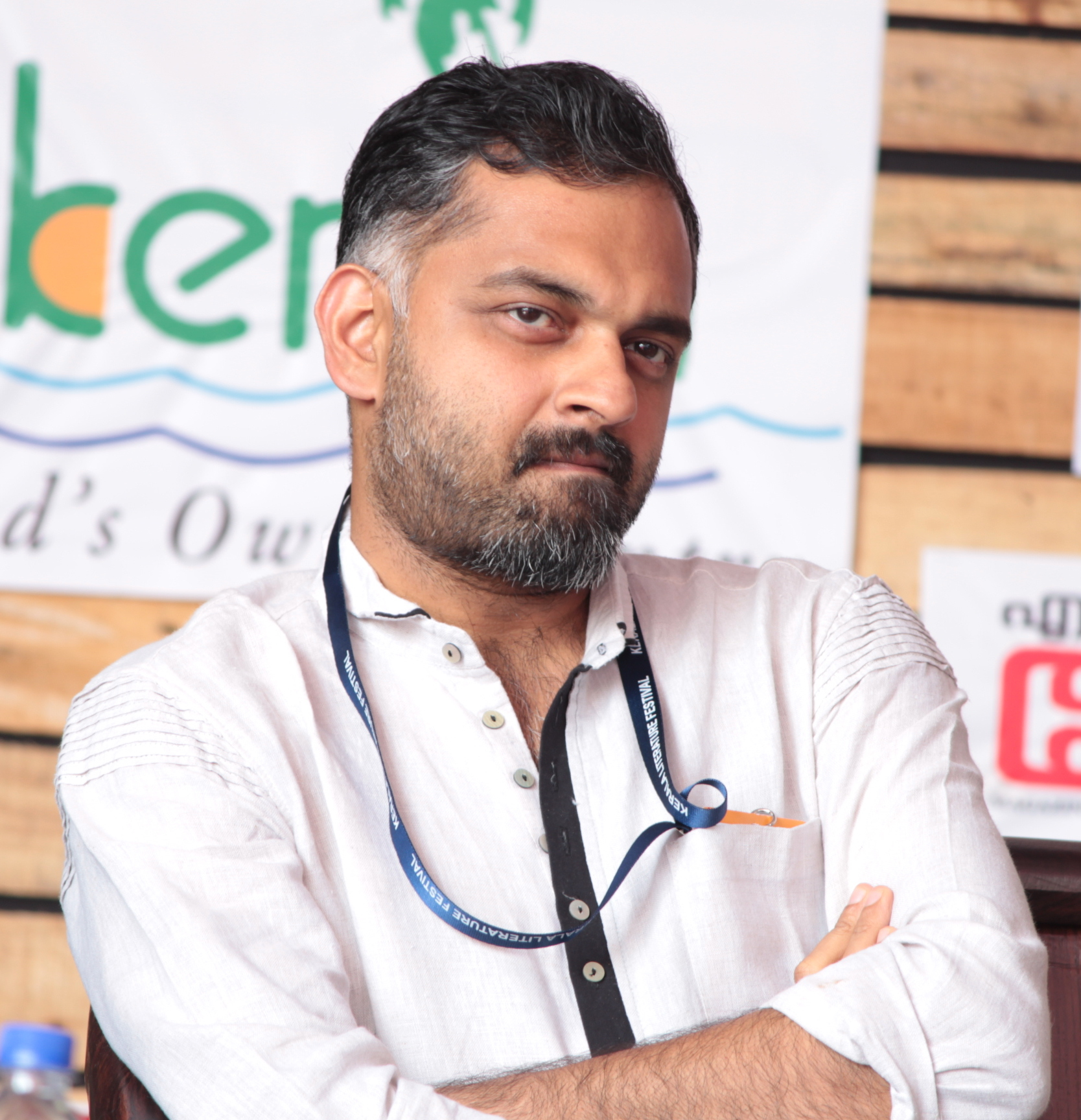
- Bijibal in 2017

Background information
- Born: Bijibal Maniyil; Thrikkakkara, Kerala, India
- Occupations: Music composer; Playback singer; Keyboardist; Violinist
- Musical career
- Genres: Film score; Filmi; World music; Dance music; Classical music
- Instruments: Keyboard, Violin, vocals
- Years active: 2007–present
- Member of: Bodhi Silent Scape; Kochi Music Foundation
- Website: bodhisilentscape.com

Bijibal Maniyil is an Indian music composer and playback singer who works predominantly in Malayalam films. In a career spanning more than twenty years, he has composed for more than 150 feature films, several television commercials and a few documentaries.His work on the movie Kaliyachan earned him the National film award in 2012.

== Career ==
Bijibal entered the film industry as a composer in 2007, with the satirical drama film Arabikatha directed by Lal Jose.

In 2013, he won the National Film Award for Best Background Score and Kerala State Film Award for the film Kaliyachan. He has also composed for several non-film Malayalam albums including Vasco Da Gama. He has also often composed for short films besides directing the short titled Sundari and also composing its score. He also composed the music for the door-opening and door-closing notification system in Kochi Metro trains which continues to be in use to this date.

The notable feature films for which Bijibal has composed include Arabikatha, Pathemari, Loudspeaker, Munnariyippu, 101 Chodyangal, Vellimoonga, Balyakalasakhi, Maheshinte Prathikaaram, Thondimuthalum Driksakshiyum, Rakshadhikari Baiju Oppu, Aby, Android Kunjappan Version 5.25, Carbon and Vellam: The Essential Drink and Thankam among others.

== Personal life ==
Bijibal started composing during his college days at St. Albert's College, Ernakulam. He was married to Santhi, who was a dancer by profession. Their marriage was held on 21 June 2002, after a brief relationship and long before Bijibal even entered the film industry. They have two children, Devadutt and Daya. Santhi, who was a post graduate in Bharatanatyam and was doing her research in Mohiniyattam died after a stroke on 29 August 2017, aged just 36. Their children Devadutt and Daya sang for films, and Daya is more popular for singing and appearing in the video of Onam Vannallo, a rhyme made as a part of the Onam festival in 2014.

== Discography ==
Key
†	Denotes films that have not yet been released

Year	Title	Songs	Score	Notes
2007	Nazrani	check	check	
2007	Rock & Roll	X mark	check	
2007	Arabikatha	check	check	Mullassery Raju Music Award for Best Music Director
2008	Minnaminnikoottam	check	check	
2009	Paleri Manikyam	check	check	Only Title Song - "Paalerum Naadaya"
2009	Kerala Cafe	check	X mark	Only Title Song - "Kadhayamama"
2009	Swa.Le.	check	check	
2009	Loudspeaker	check	check	
2009	Daddy Cool	check	check	
2009	Passenger	check	check	
2010	Marykkundoru Kunjaadu	X mark	check	
2010	Best Actor	check	check	
2010	Apoorvaragam	X mark	check	
2011	Venicile Vyaapari	check	check	
2011	Innanu Aa Kalyanam	check	X mark	
2011	Sevens	check	check	
2011	Violin	check	check	
2011	Salt N' Pepper	check	check	Asiavison Movie Award for Best Music Director
2011	Janapriyan	X mark	check	
2011	Bhakthajanangalude Sradhakku	X mark	check	
2011	Nadakame Ulakam	X mark	check	
2011	Arjunan Saakshi	check	check	
2011	Ithu Nammude Katha	X mark	check	
2011	Kudumbasree Travels	check	check	
2012	Kaliyachan	check	check	National Film Award' for Best Background Score; Kerala State Film Award for Best Background Score
2012	Da Thadiya	check	check	
2012	Bavuttiyude Namathil	X mark	check	
2012	Jawan of Vellimala	check	check	
2012	Trivandrum Lodge	X mark	check	
2012	Husbands in Goa	X mark	check	
2012	Ozhimuri	check	check	Kerala State Film Award for Best Background Score
2012	Mr. Marumakan	X mark	check	
2012	22 Female Kottayam	check	check	
2012	Mayamohini	X mark	check	
2012	Padmasree Bharat Dr. Saroj Kumar	X mark	check	
2012	Kunjaliyan	X mark	check	
2013	Vedivazhipadu	X mark	check	
2013	Punyalan Agarbattis	check	check	
2013	Idukki Gold	check	check	
2013	Daivathinte Swantham Cleetus	check	check	
2013	Blackberry	check	check	
2013	Artist	check	check	
2013	101 Chodyangal	X mark	check	
2013	5 Sundarikal	check	check	Segment - Gowri
2013	Thank You	check	check	
2013	Vallatha Pahayan	check	X mark	
2013	Red Wine	check	check	
2013	Natholi Oru Cheriya Meenalla	X mark	check	
2013	Romans	X mark	check	
2013	Isaac Newton S/O Philipose	check	check	
2014	Mylanchi Monchulla Veedu	X mark	check	
2014	Lal Bahadhur Shasthri	check	check	
2014	Varsham	check	check	
2014	Njangalude Veettile Athidhikal	X mark	check	
2014	Tamaar Padaar	check	check	
2014	Homely Meals	X mark	check	
2014	Vellimoonga	check	check	
2014	Njan	check	check	
2014	Munnariyippu	check	check	
2014	Vikramadithyan	check	check	
2014	Beware of Dogs	check	X mark	
2014	Angry Babies in Love	check	check	
2014	My Life Partner	X mark	check	
2014	Utsaha Committee	check	check	
2014	Law Point	X mark	check	
2014	Praise The Lord	X mark	check	
2014	Alice A True Story	check	check	
2014	Pakida	check	check	
2014	Balyakalasakhi	X mark	check	
2015	My God	check	check	
2015	Su Su Sudhi Vathmeekam	check	check	
2015	Salt Mango Tree	X mark	check	
2015	Rani Padmini	check	check	
2015	Amar Akbar Anthony	X mark	check	
2015	Pathemari	check	check	
2015	KL.10	check	check	
2015	Love 24x7	check	check	
2015	Acha Dhin	check	check	
2015	32aam Adhyayam 23aam Vaakyam	check	check	
2015	Nee-Na	X mark	check	
2015	She Taxi	check	check	
2015	Nellikka	check	check	
2015	100 Days of Love	X mark	check	
2015	White Boys	X mark	check	
2016	Pinneyum	check	check	
2016	Kuttikalundu Sookshikkuka	check	check	
2016	Ore Mugham	check	check	
2016	Kochavva Paulo Ayyappa Coelho	X mark	check	
2016	Shikhamani	X mark	check	
2016	Angane Thanne Nethave Anjettennam Pinnale	X mark	check	
2016	Dhanayathra	X mark	check	
2016	Maheshinte Prathikaaram	check	check	North American Film Awards 2017; remade in Telugu as Uma Maheswara Ugra Roopasya
2016	Leela	check	check	
2017	Oru Visheshapetta Biriyani Kissa	X mark	check	
2017	Pashu	check	check	
2017	Kadha Paranja Kadha	X mark	check	
2017	Chakkara Maavin Kombathu	check	check	
2017	Gandhinagaril Unniyarcha	X mark	check	
2017	Matchbox	check	check	
2017	Sherlock Toms	check	X mark	
2017	Paippin Chuvattile Pranayam	check	check	
2017	Sarvopari Palakkaran	check	check	
2017	Thondimuthalum Driksakshiyum	check	check	
2017	Oru Cinemakkaran	check	check	
2017	Rakshadhikari Baiju Oppu	check	check	
2017	Ramante Edanthottam	check	check	
2017	Thrissivaperoor Kliptham	check	check	
2017	Aby	check	X mark	
2017	Munthirivallikal Thalirkkumbol	check	check	2 songs and score only
2018	Paviyettante Madhurachooral	X mark	check	
2018	Aanakkallan	X mark	check	
2018	Thanaha	X mark	check	
2018	Shabdam	check	check	
2018	Udalaazham	X mark	check	
2018	Drama	X mark	check	
2018	Chalakkudikkaaran Changathi	check	check	
2018	Mangalyam Thanthunanena	X mark	check	
2018	Oru Kuttanadan Blog	X mark	check	
2018	Uncle	check	check	
2018	Orayiram Kinakkalal	X mark	check	
2018	Carbon	X mark	check	
2018	Kinar	X mark	check	Simultaneously shot in Tamil as Keni
2019	Android Kunjappan Version 5.25	check	check	
2019	Puzhikkadakan	check	check	
2019	Adhyarathri	check	check	
2019	Vikruthi	check	check	
2019	Aakasha Ganga 2	check	check	
2019	Kozhipporu	check	check	
2019	Sathyam Paranjaa Vishwasikkuvo	X mark	check	
2019	And the Oscar Goes to	check	check	
2019	March Randaam Vyaazham	X mark	check	
2019	Muhabbathin Kunjabdhulla	X mark	check	
2019	A for Apple	X mark	check	
2019	Subharathri	check	check	
2019	Veyilmarangal	check	check	
2019	Pengalila	X mark	check	
2019	Naan Petta Makan	check	check	
2019	Kalikkoottukkaar	X mark	check	
2019	Swarnna Malsyangal	check	check	
2021	Jwaalamukhi	check	check	
2021	Vellam: The Essential Drink	check	check	
2021	Halal Love Story	check	X mark	One song only
2021	Black Coffee	check	check	
2021	Pottakinar	X mark	check	
2021	Varthamanam	X mark	check	
2021	Uma Maheswara Ugra Roopasya	check	check	Remake of Maheshinte Prathikaaram. Telugu debut. First non-Malayalam film.
2021	Kozhipporu	check	check	
2021	Silencer	X mark	check	
2022	Upacharapoorvam Gunda Jayan	check	check	
2022	Bharatha Circus	check	check	
2022	Vanitha	X mark	check	
2022	Viddikalude Maashu	check	check	
2022	Village Cricket Boy	check	check	
2022	Lalitham Sundaram	check	check	
2022	Aakashathinu Thazhe	check	check	
2022	Aquarium	check	check	
2022	Four	check	check	
2022	Drama Single Shot	check	check	
2022	Hawk's Muffin	check	check	
2022	Thirimali	check	check	
2023	Thankam	check	check	
2023	Ntikkakkakkoru Premondarnn	X mark	check	
2023	Neelavelicham	check	check	
2023	Nila	check	check	
2023	Charlie's Angel †	check	check	
2023	Aaro †	check	check	
2024	Swargam	check	check	
2024	Manorathangal	check	check	
2024	Poyyamozhi	X mark	check	
2025	Ariku	check	check	
2025	Aabhyanthara Kuttavaali	check	X mark	
2026	Law and Order	X mark	check	

== Awards ==
Award	Year	Project	Category
South Indian International Movie Awards	2022	Vellam	Best Music Director
Kerala State Film Awards	2018	Aami	Best Background Music
Filmfare Awards South	2017	Maheshinte Prathikaaram	Best Music Director – Malayalam
Mirchi Music Awards South	2017	Maheshinte Prathikaaram	Best music director
Mirchi Music Awards South	2017	Maheshinte Prathikaaram	Best technical sound mixer
Mirchi Music Awards South	2017	Maheshinte Prathikaaram	Song of the year
Mirchi Music Awards South	2017	Maheshinte Prathikaaram	Best vocalist male Malayalam
South Indian International Movie Awards	2017	Maheshinte Prathikaaram	Best Music Director
North American Film Awards	2017	Maheshinte Prathikaaram	Best Music Director
Kerala State Film Award	2015	Pathemari, Nee-Na	Best Background Music
Asiavision Awards	2015	Pathemari/Kaliyachan	Best Music Director
Kerala State Film Award	2014	Njaan	Best Background Music
Kerala State Film Award	2013	Balyakalasakhi	Best Background Score
National Film Award	2012	Kaliyachan	Best Background Score
Kerala State Film Award	2012	Kaliyachan, Ozhimuri	Best Background Score
Asiavision Awards	2011	Salt N' Pepper	Best Music Director
Mullassery Raju Music Award	2007	Arabikkatha	Best Music Director
