= Paleri Manikyam: Oru Pathirakolapathakathinte Katha =

Paleri Manikyam: Oru Pathirakolapathakathinte Katha (transl. Manikyam of Paleri: A Midnight Murder Story) may refer to:

- Paleri Manikyam: Oru Pathirakolapathakathinte Katha (novel), a 2009 Malayalam-language novel by Indian novelist T. P. Rajeevan
  - Undying Echoes of Silence, the English version of the novel by Rajeevan
  - Paleri Manikyam: Oru Pathirakolapathakathinte Katha (film), a 2009 Indian film adaptation
