= Filmfare Award for Best Supporting Actress – Malayalam =

Indian annual film award

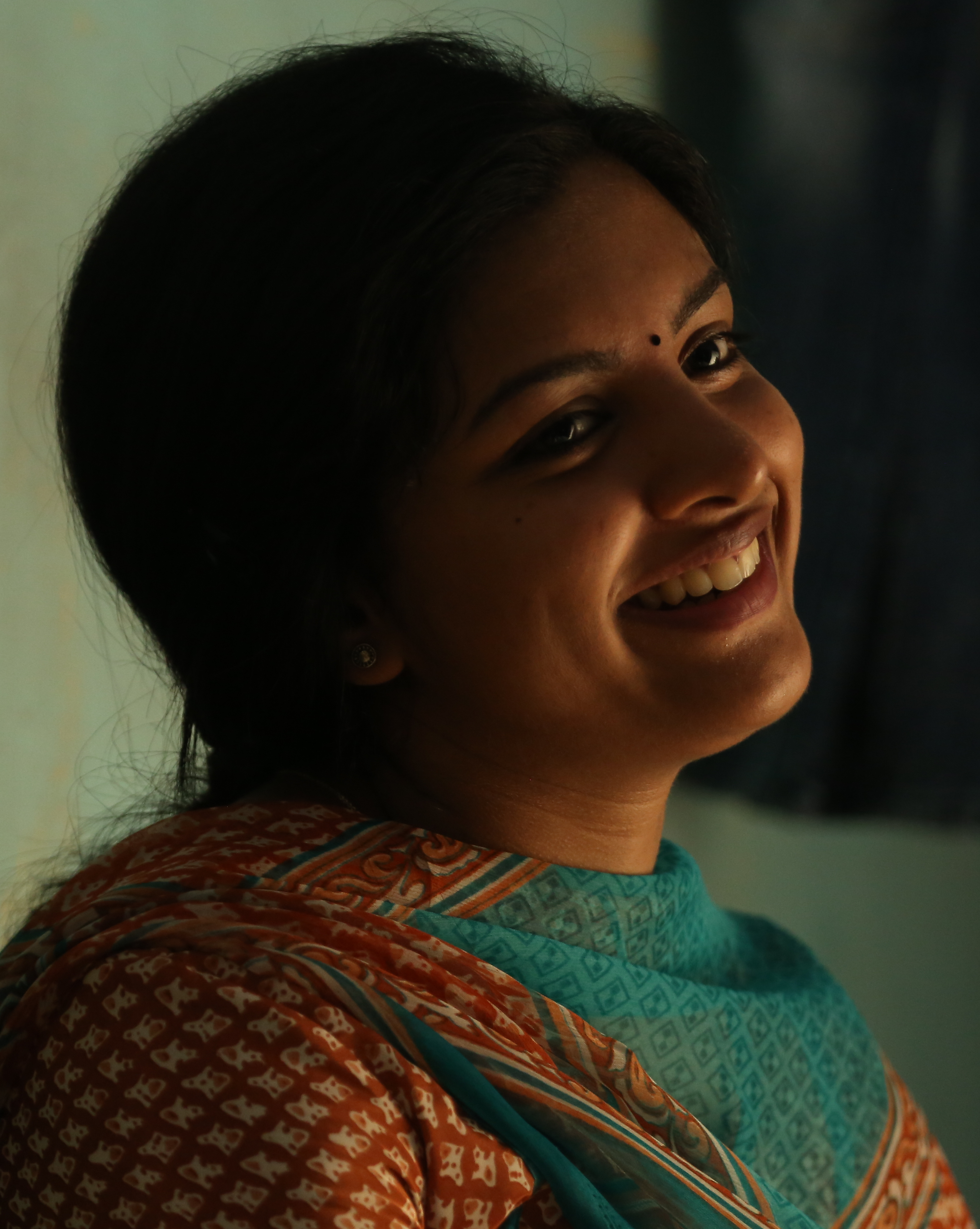
- The 2024 recipient: Lijomol Jose
- Awarded for: Best Performance by an Actress in a Supporting Role in Malayalam films
- Country: India
- Presented by: Filmfare
- Currently held by: Lijomol Jose for Her (2024)
- Website: http://filmfareawards.indiatimes.com/

The Filmfare Award for Best Supporting Actress – Malayalam is given by the Filmfare magazine as part of its annual Filmfare Awards South for Malayalam films.

== Superlatives ==
Superlative	Actor	Record
Actress with most awards	Lena, Asha Sarath, Parvathy Thiruvothu	2
Actress with most nominations	Samvrutha Sunil	7
Actress With Most Nominations in a single Year	Anaswara Rajan	2023 (2)
Oldest Nominee	Vani Viswanath	61
Oldest Winner	K.P.A.C Lalitha	56
Youngest Winner	Anaswara Rajan	21
Youngest Nominee	Anaswara Rajan	21

== Winners ==
Here is the list of the award winners and the roles and films they won for.

Year	Actress	Role	Film
2024	Lijomol Jose	Abhinaya	Her
2023	Anaswara Rajan	Sara Mohammed	Neru
2023	Poornima Indrajith	Umma (Pathu)	Thuramukham
2022	Parvathy Thiruvothu	Bharathi	Puzhu
2020–2021	Gowri Nandha	Kannamma	Ayyappanum Koshiyum
2018	Savithri Sreedharan	Jameela	Sudani From Nigeria
2017	Shanthi Krishna	Sheela Chacko	Njandukalude Nattil Oridavela
2019	AWARDS FUNCTION WAS SUSPENDED DUE TO COVID-19 PANDEMIC
2016	Asha Sarath	Suma Raghu	Anuraga Karikkin Vellam
2015	Lena	Pathumma	Ennu Ninte Moideen
2014	Parvathy Thiruvothu	RJ Sarah	Bangalore Days
2013	Asha Sarath	IG Geetha Prabhakar	Drishyam
2012	Gauthami Nair	Lakshmi	Diamond Necklace
2011	Lena	Shruthi	Traffic
2010	Urvashi	Clara	Mummy & Me
2009	Padmapriya Janakiraman	Neeli	Pazhassiraja
2008	Sukanya	Theresa	Innathe Chintha Vishayam
2007	Lakshmi Gopalaswamy	Moosa's lover	Paradesi
2006	Roma	Sarah Elizabeth	Notebook
2004	K. P. A. C. Lalitha	Kunju Maria	Manassinakkare

== Nominations ==
- 2008 Sukanya – Innathe Chintha Vishayam
  - Geetu Mohandas – Akasha Gopuram
  - Mohini – Innathe Chintha Vishayam
  - Roma – Minnaminnikoottam
  - Samvrutha Sunil – Thirakkatha
- 2009 Padmapriya – Pazhassi Raja
  - Lakshmi Gopalaswamy – Bhramaram
  - Lakshmi Rai – Evidam Swargamanu
  - Samvrutha Sunil – Neelathaamara
  - Sona Nair – Passenger
- 2010 Urvashi – Mummy & Me
  - KPAC Lalitha – Elsamma Enna Aankutty
  - Lakshmi Gopalaswamy – Shikkar
  - Lakshmi Priya – Kadha Thudarunnu
  - Vinaya Prasad – Marykkundoru Kunjaadu
- 2011 Lena – Traffic
  - Meghna Raj – Beautiful
  - Mythili – Salt N' Pepper
  - Nithya Menen – Urumi
  - Ramya Nambeeshan – Chappa Kurish
- 2012 Gauthami Nair – Diamond Necklace
  - Samvrutha Sunil – Diamond Necklace
  - KPAC Lalitha – Nidra
  - Mythili – Ee Adutha Kalathu
  - Rashmi Satheesh – 22 Female Kottayam
- 2013 Asha Sarath – Drishyam
  - Bindu Panicker – Pullipulikalum Aattinkuttiyum
  - Geetha – Zachariayude Garbhinikal
  - Lena – Left Right Left
  - Sanusha – Zachariayude Garbhinikal
- 2014 Parvathy Thiruvothu – Bangalore Days
  - Muthumani – Njaan
  - Lena – Vikramadithyan
  - Sajitha Madathil – Njaan
  - Sethu Lakshmi – How Old Are You?
- 2015 Lena – Ennu Ninte Moideen
  - Ann Augustine – Nee-Na
  - Aparna Gopinath – Charlie
  - Miya – Anarkali
  - Namitha Pramod – Chandrettan Evideya
- 2016 Asha Sarath – Anuraga Karikkin Vellam
  - Abhija Sivakala – Ozhivudivasathe Kali
  - Aparna Balamurali – Maheshinte Prathikaaram
  - Lakshmi Ramakrishnan – Jacobinte Swargarajyam
  - Rohini – Guppy
- 2017 Shanthi Krishna – Njandukalude Nattil Oridavela
  - Aishwarya Rajesh – Jomonte Suvisheshangal
  - Anna Rajan – Angamaly Diaries
  - Aparna Balamurali – Sarvopari Palakkaran
  - Srinda – Sherlock Toms
- 2018 Savithri Sreedharan – Sudani from Nigeria
  - Muthumani – Uncle
  - Nimisha Sajayan – Oru Kuprasidha Payyan
  - Pauly Valsan – Ee.Ma.Yau
  - Sarasa Balussery – Sudani from Nigeria
- 2020–21 Gowri Nandha – Ayyappanum Koshiyum
  - Asha Sharath – Drishyam 2
  - Leona Lishoy – Anveshanam
  - Nimisha Sajayan – One
  - Srinda – Kuruthi
  - Unnimaya Prasad – Joji
  - Urvashi – Varane Avashyamund
- 2022 Parvathy Thiruvothu – Puzhu
  - Darshana Rajendran – Hridayam
  - Grace Antony – Rorschach
  - Mamta Mohandas – Jana Gana Mana
  - Radhika Radhakrishnan – Appan
  - Sshivada – Meri Awas Suno
  - Surabhi Lakshmi – Kumari
- 2023 Poornima Indrajith – Thuramukham and Anaswara Rajan – Neru
  - Anaswara Rajan – Vilasam
  - Aswathy B – B 32 Muthal 44 Vare
  - Darshana Rajendran – Purusha Pretham
  - Manju Pillai – Falimy
- 2024 Lijomol Jose – Her
  - Abhinaya – Pani
  - Aparna Balamurali – Kishkindha Kaandam
  - Pooja Mohanraj – Aavesham
  - Surabhi – ARM
  - Vani Viswanath – Rifle Club
