= Pranchiyettan & the Saint =

- Theatrical release poster
- Directed by: Ranjith
- Written by: Ranjith
- Produced by: Ranjith
- Starring: Mammootty; Jesse Fox Allen; Jagathy Sreekumar; Sasi Kalinga; Tini Tom
- Cinematography: Venu
- Edited by: Vijay Shankar
- Music by: Ouseppachan
- Production company: Capitol Theater
- Distributed by: Play House Release
- Release date: 10 September 2010
- Running time: 140 minutes
- Country: India
- Language: Malayalam

Pranchiyettan & the Saint is a 2010 Indian Malayalam-language satirical comedy fantasy film written, directed, and produced by Ranjith. The film centres on the fictitious conversation between the Thrissur-based businessman C. E. Francis, a.k.a. Pranchiyettan (Mammootty), and St. Francis of Assisi (Jesse Fox Allen). Khushbu Sundar, Priyamani, Innocent, Siddique, Jagathy Sreekumar, Ganapathy, Sasi Kalinga, Tini Tom, and Biju Menon play the other important roles. The film is considered one of the best comedy films in Malayalam cinema and has attained cult status in the years following its release. Some critics consider the film as one of the defining movies of the Malayalam New Wave.

== Plot ==
Francis of the Chiramel house, nicknamed Pranchiyettan, visits a church one night and starts praying to Saint Francis. Suddenly, Saint Francis appears in front of Pranchi and starts speaking in Malayalam to Pranchi. From there, Pranchi narrates several events from his life that led him there to the Saint.

As a kid, Pranchi was mockingly called Ari Pranchi (transl. Rice Pranchi) due to Pranchi's family historically being in the rice business. One day, Jose, who desires Pranchi's girlfriend Omana, starts a fight with Pranchi by mocking him. Omana, who had warned Pranchi to never get into fights, gets angry with him and breaks up. Later, Omana marries Jose.

Many years later, Pranchi, though he has never passed high school, has become a wealthy and influential businessman. However, people still mock him behind his back, calling him Ari Pranchi. Pranchi, who is saddened by this, tries many ways to gain respect as a result. He tries to become a club's president but loses to Jose, who makes fun of him before Pranchi's campaign speech. He even attempts to get the Padmashree, the fourth highest civilian honor in India, in order to finally gain respect. He is supported in these endeavors by his assistant Menon. When the Padmashree plan fails, Pranchi locks himself inside his house for days.

One day, a woman who is also named Padmashree, knocks on Pranchi's door, and Pranchi gets angry when he hears her name (he assumes he is being mocked for losing the Padmashree award) so kicks her. After the misunderstanding is cleared, Padmashree invites Pranchi to inaugurate her art gallery, citing the reason that Pranchi has donated to many heart operations for poor people. Eventually Padmashree also helps redecorate Pranchi's outdated looking house and Pranchi falls in love with her. Just as he is about to propose, she says she has to leave to Mumbai, and Pranchi doesn't say anything.

Pranchi, saddened by his loss of Padmashree, decides to help a struggling student named Pauly pass his exams. Pauly, who studies in Pranchi's friend's school, has a difficult home life and he is the only kid that has a high chance to fail his 10th grade exams. However, Pranchi finds out that Pauly is a very intelligent child and wonders why Pauly is not studying for his exams. Pranchi hires a tutor for Pauly, but Pauly chases the tutor away by playing some intelligent tricks on him. Eventually, the exams come around and Pranchi finds out that Pauly is the only kid in the school that failed. Angered, Pranchi goes to hit Pauly, when Pauly reveals that the man looking after him has abandoned him and that his real father is in jail.

Pranchi goes to meet Pauly's father, who reveals that he was a drug addict and was suspicious that his wife was cheating on him. When he saw his wife talking to Pauly's teacher about Pauly's future, he hacked his wife and Pauly's teacher to death in front of Pauly in an inebriated state. While it was happening, the blood spilled into Pauly's book. Now, Pauly is terrified to open a book because it reminds of that horrific day. Pauly's father then meets Pauly and he apologizes for ruining Pauly's life. Meanwhile, Pranchi learns from a guard in the prison that Pauly's father will die soon due to a disease and Pranchi takes Pauly away.

Pranchi arrives at the Church while Pauly is sleeping in the car, and this leads to the beginning of the film. Pranchi asks the Saint what to do now and the Saint says that Pranchi is a good man and everything that has happened to him, good or bad, will only help him in the future. Saint Francis then shows Pranchi 3 events that are happening elsewhere: Padmashree saying to her friend that she is coming back to Kerala and intends to propose to Pranchi, Jose and Omana cheating on each other, and Nambiar, the man that cheated Pranchi with the promise of getting the Padma Shree award, getting arrested. Francis tells Pranchi to make his own decision and Pranchi says that he will adopt Pauly and look after him as a son. Pranchi wants Pauly to meet the Saint but by the time he brings Pauly the Saint disappears. Pauly tells Pranchi that he is like a saint to Pauly and Pranchi decides to rewrite the 10th exams with Pauly, hoping to pass.

== Cast ==
- Mammootty as C. E. Francis a.k.a. Pranchiyettan
  - Shihab as Young Pranchi
- Jesse Fox Allen as Saint Francis of Assisi
- Khushbu as Dr. Omana
  - Saro Jose Ollukaran as Young Omana
- Priyamani as Padmashree Menon a.k.a. Puppy
- Innocent as Vasu Menon
- Sasi Kalinga as Eeyyappan
- Siddique as Dr. Jose
- Balachandran Chullikkadu as Ajay Nambiar
- Ganapathi as Pauli K. J.
- Biju Menon as Joppan, Pauly's father
- Idavela Babu as Yousuf
- Jagathy Sreekumar as Pandit Deena Dayal
- Ramu as Bahuleyan
- Jayaraj Warrier as Suresh Babu
- Shivaji Guruvayoor as Antony Master
- T. G. Ravi as Uthuppu
- Tini Tom as Subran
- Sreejith Ravi as Varghese
- Vimal Kumar as Unni
- Jijoy Rajagopal as Ad Film director
- V. K. Sreeraman as Achutha Warrier
- Chali Pala as Jail superintendent
- Vikraman Nair as Puppy's Relative

== Production ==
The film was announced in June 2010. The film is produced by Renjith, under the banner of his Capitol Theatres. Shooting began on 1 July 2010.

The cast includes Mammootty, he plays the role of Cherammal Enashu Francis, a rice merchant in Thrissur. Hafis Firosh plays Mammootty's childhood counterpart. Innocent plays the role of Vasu Menon, friend of Pranchiyettan. Australian theatre artist Jesse Fox Allen played the role of the Saint. Apart from cine-artistes, this film also features many faces from the professional drama world, as in Renjith's Paleri Manikyam. Jagathy Sreekumar plays Deena Dayal. "My character is there only in a few scenes but he makes a definite impact, which is quite exciting for an actor. He is an idealistic teacher, who lives as per Gandhian principles and leads a simple life," says Jagathy Sreekumar. Master Ganapathy, who plays Pauli, says, "It is indeed great to be doing such a nice role with some of the big names in the industry. My character is a live wire."

== Music ==
The score and the only song of the film were composed by Ouseppachan; the lyrics were penned by Shibu Chakravarthy. The music by Ouseppachan was "among the highlights of the film", according to one reviewer.

== Reception ==
=== Box office ===
The film was commercial success. It ran for more than 200 days in a theatre in Kerala. The film grossed close to ₹3 crore (US$320,000) from 19 days. The film collected US$957 from UK box office. It was made on a budget of ₹1.50 crore The film ran for 63 days in Oman box office, which is the longest running Malayalam film till date in Oman box office.

=== Critical response ===
Rediff's reviewer rated the film 5 out of 5 and said, "Pranchiyettan and the Saint is impressive... the success of [the film] rests on the shoulders of writer director Ranjith who gives a meaty story to actors to dig their teeth into." The performance by Mammootty as well as the supporting cast also earned appreciation from critics. The review on Rediff said, "The film depends heavily on Mammootty's histrionic skills to be convincing and it works. It is this effortless and natural performance that gives Pranchiyettan [its] lifeblood." Nowrunning comments: "Very few films are complex and comic at the same time, but Pranchiyettan achieves this almost impossible feat by employing clever plot devices, a fresh narrative structure and a string of metaphoric scenarios." The review praises Ranjith's work, saying, "There shouldn't be any trouble enthroning Ranjith as the harbinger of change in Malayalam cinema". Sify called the film "Very Good" and rated it 4 out of 5. Their review focused mainly on the apt usage of Thrissur slang by Mammootty.

=== Accolades ===
Amrita-FEFKA Film Awards

- Best Actor – Mammootty

Asianet Film Awards

- Best Film – Pranchiyettan & the Saint
- Best Actor – Mammootty
- Best Cinematographer – Venu

Asiavision Awards

- Best Film – Pranchiyettan & the Saint
- Best Actor – Mammootty
- Best Supporting Actor – Siddique
- Outstanding Performance – Innocent

Filmfare Awards

- Best Film – Pranchiyettan & the Saint (Won)
- Best Director – Ranjith (Won)
- Best Actor – Mammootty (Won)
- Best Actress – Priyamani (Nominated)

Inspire Film Awards

- Best Film – Pranchiyettan & the Saint
- Best Actor – Mammootty
- Best Script – Ranjith

Kerala State Film Awards

- Kerala State Film Award for Best Film with Popular Appeal and Aesthetic Value- Ranjith

Kerala Film Critics Awards

- Best Film – Pranchiyettan & the Saint
- Best Actor – Mammootty
- Best Script – Ranjith
- Best Director – Ranjith

Vanitha Film Awards

- Best Film – Pranchiyettan & the Saint
- Best Actor – Mammootty
- Best Director – Ranjith
- Best Script – Ranjith
- Best Cinematography – Venu

Vellinakshatram Film Awards

- Best Film – Pranchiyettan & the Saint
- Best Actor – Mammootty
- Best Director – Ranjith
