= Loham =

- Theatrical release poster
- Directed by: Ranjith
- Written by: Ranjith
- Produced by: Antony Perumbavoor
- Starring: Mohanlal; Renji Panicker; Siddique; Andrea Jeremiah; Ajmal Ameer
- Cinematography: Kunjunni S. Kumar
- Edited by: Manoj Kannoth
- Music by: Songs: Sreevalsan J Menon; Score: C. Rajamani
- Production company: Aashirvad Cinemas
- Distributed by: Maxlab Entertainments
- Release date: 20 August 2015 (India)
- Running time: 130 minutes
- Country: India
- Language: Malayalam
- Box office: est. ₹14 crore (US$1.5 million)

Loham (transl. Metal) is a 2015 Indian Malayalam-language action thriller film written and directed by Ranjith, and produced by Antony Perumbavoor for the production company Aashirvad Cinemas. The film, starring Mohanlal, Renji Panicker, Siddique, Andrea Jeremiah and Ajmal Ameer, is about an elusive smuggling operation and the mysterious disappearance of 100 kilograms (220 lb) of gold. Sreevalsan J. Menon and C. Rajamani composed the soundtrack and film score, respectively.

Loham opened on 20 August 2015 in over 250 theatres across India. Its release in the United Arab Emirates and the United Kingdom followed on 28 August. The film was a commercial success at the box office, and set the record for the highest opening day gross for a Malayalam film at the time. Loham received mixed reactions from critics, some of whom praised the lead actors' performances and the film's technical aspects but criticised the screenplay. The film's gross in 2015 following its release was approximately ₹14 crore (US$1.5 million) worldwide.

== Plot ==
A casket containing the body of a deceased construction worker, Rafeeq, is flown from Dubai to the Calicut International Airport in Kozhikode, then transported by ambulance to its destination. While en route, the ambulance is ambushed by criminals hired by Muhammed Unni to retrieve the 100 kilograms (220 lb) of gold that he and his co-smugglers have hidden in the casket. When they open the casket, they discover the gold is missing.

Around the same time, Jayanthi arrives in Kochi from Mumbai in search of her missing husband, Ramesh, an IRS officer who frequently disappeared from home for various reasons, but is now a suspect in the gold smuggling. Jayanthi arranged for a taxi to drive her to various locations in her quest to find Ramesh. Raju, the cab driver appears to have an interest of his own in the circumstances surrounding Ramesh's disappearance. At Jayanthi's bidding, Raju drives her to the home of her mother-in-law, where he cooks for them and interacts in such a way to earn their trust.

Jayanthi then asks Raju to drive her to Kochi to the office of her friend, ACP Chandrasekharan, who promises Jayanthi he will investigate the disappearance of Ramesh. After leaving Chandrasekharan's office, Raju drives Jayanthi to see Chandrasekharan's wife, Adv. Rekha, who is also her friend. During their chat, Jayanthi receives a surprise phone call from Ramesh. He explains that he is in Kovalam for an official meeting but will return home the next day, and insists that Jayanthi return home as well.

Later, Chandrasekharan informs Jayanthi that the phone number Ramesh called from was actually in Kochi, not Kovalam. It is also revealed that Sudheer, Ramesh's brother, is involved in the smuggling operation. Meanwhile, Unni, Babu, Shaji, Shenoy, and MLA meet atop an apartment building to discuss the circumstances surrounding the gold they smuggled into Kozhikode and lost to an ambush while in transit from the airport. They suspect Ramesh is involved since he disappeared right after the incident. They devise a plan to kidnap Jayanthi in order to force Ramesh to return the gold.

An unsuspecting Raju and Jayanthi become the targets of their surprise attack in which Jayanthi is rendered unconscious. Raju draws his concealed handgun and foils the kidnapping by shooting at his assailants. He collects the unconscious Jayanthi and transports her to a safe place. When she awakens, she finds herself surrounded by strangers. She also discovers that Raju is not just a cab driver, but is part of an investigation to find Ramesh and the missing gold. Raju explains to her that Ramesh was involved in the smuggling, and has since become the target of the criminals.

Jayanthi returns to Rekha's home for safety, and Chandrasekharan begins investigating Raju, who, in a turn of events, has raised suspicion. Raju and his team, now disguised as Sabarimala pilgrims, rent a van hoping to catch Jayan. Raju's teammate, Ameer Amanulla, pretends to be an informer for Arif Bhai. He lures Jayan into a trap by telling him a gift from Arif is waiting for him in the van. Jayan is captured and interrogated by Raju, who questions the 30,000 Dirham Jayan received from Arif in Dubai, as well as the circumstances surrounding the death of Rafeeq.

Jayan reveals that Rafeeq was purposely pushed off a building to his death as part of Arif's master plan to transport the gold, thinking no one would suspect the gold was hidden in his casket. The trail leads Raju to the home of Ramesh's parents, where Ramesh has been hiding under the protection of his mother, who is also aware of the smuggling. Raju takes Ramesh into custody along with others involved in the crime, but he lets Ramesh go. It is eventually revealed that co-smuggler Shaji, a young politician, had deceived Unni and took the gold for himself.

After Raju and his team retrieve the gold, they are detained by local police. Raju identifies himself as a RAW agent and his team as intelligence officers from various agencies of India. He discloses his real name as Rajeev Sathyamoorthy. The police release them so that they can complete their investigation and allows them to go back to Mumbai. However, it is revealed that Raju and his team are the actual smugglers.

== Cast ==
Principal cast

- Mohanlal as Rajeev "Raju" Sathyamoorthy
- Renji Panicker as Albert Alex
- Siddique as Muhammed Unni
- Andrea Jeremiah as Jayanthi Ramesh
- Abu Salim as Ameer Amanullah
- Gowri Nandha as Jacqueline Fernandez
- Vijayaraghavan as ACP M. Chandrasekharan
- Niranjana Anoop as Mythri
- K. P. A. C. Lalitha as Ramesh and Sudheer's mother
- Ashvin Mathew as Ramesh Nambiar IRS, Custom's officer
- Ajmal Ameer as Azhagan Perumal
- Hareesh Peradi as MLA
- Suresh Krishna as Shaji Bhaskar
- Krishna as Jayaram Shenoy
- Joju George as Pallan Davis
- Mohan Jose as Kunjumon
- Muthumani as Advocate Rekha Chandrasekhar, Mythri's mother
- Santhosh Keezhattoor as Sudheer, Ramesh's brother
- Irshad as Jayan
- Musthafa as Rafeeq Muhammed
- Mythili as Rafeeq's wife
- Aju Varghese as auto driver
- Jayan Cherthala as Commissioner Varghese IPS

Cameos

- Joy Mathew as Arif Bhai
- Shyamaprasad as Rajeev Sathyamoorthy, RAW officer
- Pearle Maaney as the bride
- Manikuttan as a boy at the wedding
- Srinda Arhaan as a girl at the wedding
- Thesni Khan as a nurse
- Tini Tom as Jacob alias Thrissurkaran Thendi
- Soubin Shahir as a street rowdy
- Sasi Kalinga as the stranger near Jayan's home
- James Pottackal as Jolly Moothedan
- Pradeep Chandran as SI Biju

== Production ==
=== Development ===
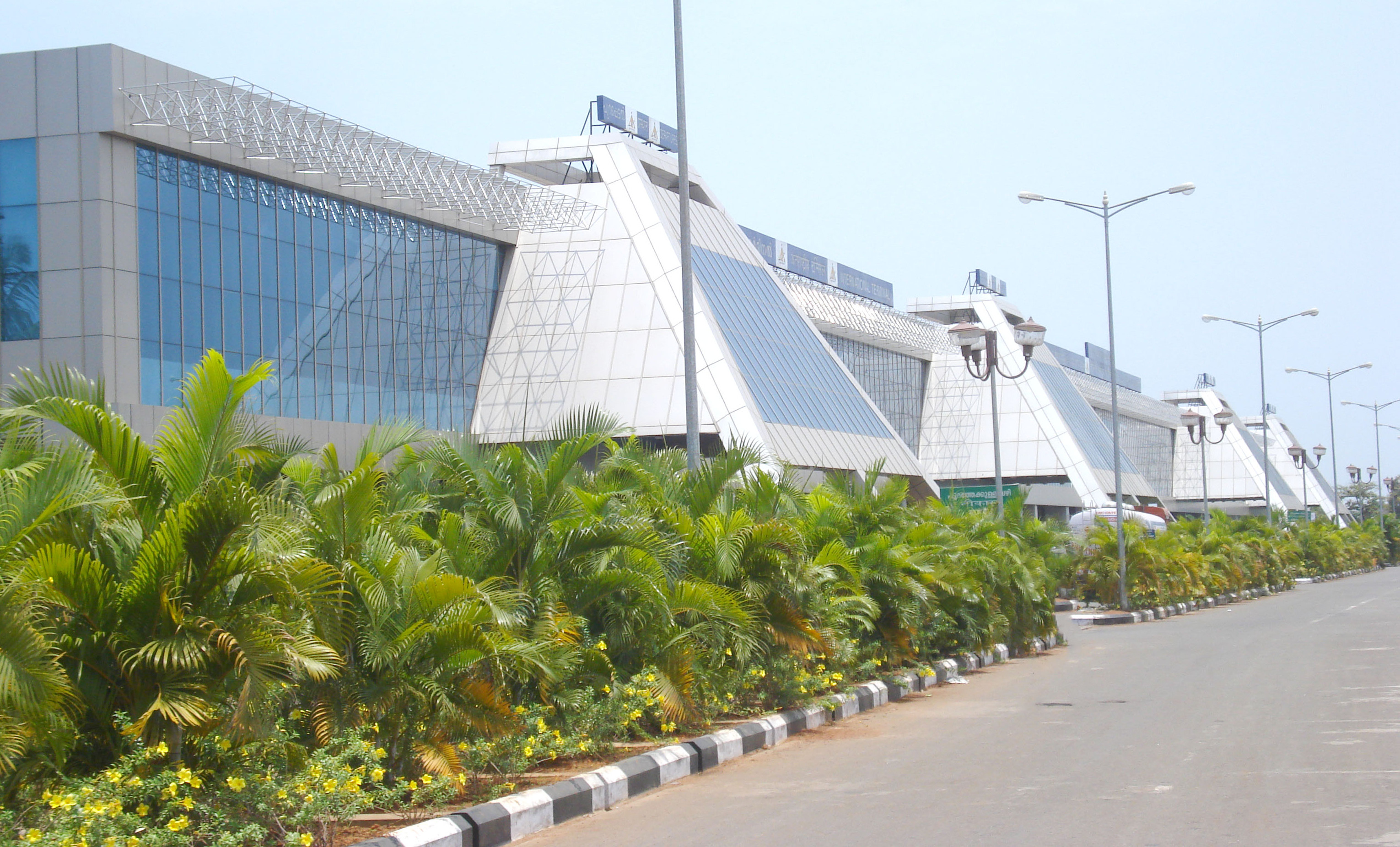
Calicut International Airport, where the casket with the hidden gold arrived for transport to its destination

In 2013, Ranjith announced plans to produce a film for Aashirvad Cinemas, starring Mohanlal and Manju Warrier, which was scheduled for a 2014 release coinciding with the annual Vishu festival held in Kerala, India. Production was slated to begin in December 2013. The announcement of Loham received considerable media attention as it was Manju Warrier's return to the screen after leaving the film industry to marry actor Dileep. The media coverage was further heightened when Prithviraj Sukumaran joined the cast. However, the film was shelved soon after its official announcement. Ranjith explained it was dropped because the film's story resembled that of another film in the same language released during its pre-production time.

Later that year, the director planned another film with the same production company starring Mohanlal, which was titled G for Gold. Filming was scheduled to begin on 10 January 2014 in Kozhikode and Kasargode, but production did not begin on schedule due to Ranjith's dissatisfaction with the screenplay. The film was speculated to be titled as Loham in February 2015.

=== Casting and crew ===
Loham is the fifth film directed by Ranjith in which Mohanlal was cast in the lead role. Mohanlal plays a cab driver in the film. Gowri Nandha received boxing lessons to help her prepare for her role. Niranjana Anoop, a daughter of one of Ranjith's family friends, made her acting debut in the film as Mythri, a badly behaved youngster. Loham is the second collaboration between Ameer and Mohanlal, following Madampi (2008). Ajmal's character's looks were modelled after popular young politicians in the country, who are often spotted in the white kurta-jacket outfit. In March 2015, it was confirmed that Aju Varghese would play a guest role. Also Deepak Parambol who came to see Mohanlal in the filming location ended up in a guest role. In April, Srinda Ashab, Manikuttan and Parvathi Menon were also signed for guest appearances in a musical performance. The Hindu wedding song was shot in Kozhikode. Several media outlets reported Pearle Maaney was to perform an item number in the film but the report was determined to be incorrect after a selfie of Maaney dressed in a wedding outfit was leaked online. She appeared in a cameo role. Maaney's scenes were filmed in three days. Salim grew a beard and shaved his head for his role. He said, "My getup in the movie is similar to that of Dwayne Johnson".

Kunjunni S. Kumar, son of cinematographer S. Kumar, was hired as Loham's cinematographer. Kunjunni had first worked with Ranjith as an associate director during the production of Indian Rupee (2011) while his father worked behind the camera. Earlier, he was supposed to debut as a cinematographer on Ranjith's Leela in 2012, but the project was shelved ten days before production. In an interview with the Deccan Chronicle, Kunjunni said that after the script narration, Ranjith told him to avoid gimmicks in framing and shots in order to make it more realistic. Mythili, who was cast by Ranjith in her debut film, acted in and served as an assistant director for the film which was her debut behind the camera. She also sang a duet song in the film's soundtrack. Sreevalsan J. Menon was selected by Ranjith to compose the film's original music score. Renji Panicker suggested Menon to Ranjith during the film's pre-production stage. C. Rajamani composed the film score.

=== Filming and promotions ===
Principal photography began on 9 March 2015. The film was shot at various locations such as Kozhikode, Kochi, Delhi and Dubai. The first-look poster featuring Mohanlal was released on 29 June 2015. More detailed posters were released during the first week of August. The first poster showed an ensemble cast with Mohanlal in the centre; their facial expressions indicative of the film's thriller genre. Other posters showed Mohanlal wearing army-style camouflage pants.

The first teaser of the film was 43 seconds long and was released on 12 August 2015. It received positive reviews in various media outlets with regard to Mohanlal's acting, and for the film's plot as a thriller. Upon release, the teaser started trending.

== Soundtrack ==
Loham: Original Motion Picture Soundtrack

Soundtrack album by Sreevalsan J. Menon
- Released: 17 August 2015
- Recorded: 2015
- Genre: Film soundtrack
- Length: 19:03
- Language: Malayalam
- Label: Satyam Audios
- Producer: Sreevalsan J. Menon

Sreevalsan J. Menon chronology
Swapaanam (2014)	Loham: Original Motion Picture Soundtrack (2015)

The film's music was composed by Sreevalsan J. Menon, and lyrics were written by Rafeeq Ahammed, Manoj Kuroor and Rajeev Nair. The first song, "Kanaka Mayilanchi", sung by Mythili, was released by Mathrubhumi on 13 August 2015. The Times of India called the duet Mythili sang with Shahabaz Aman "a melody that remind [sic] listeners of the golden era of Malayalam cinema". The audio CD comprising three songs was released on 17 August during a function held at Kochi.

Track list
No.	Title	Lyrics	Singer(s)	Length
1.	"Ethippoyi"	Manoj Kuroor	Dr. Bineetha Renjith, Siyad	3:41
2.	"Kanaka Mayilanchi" (duet version)	Rafeeq Ahammed	Mythili, Shahabaz Aman	4:16
3.	"Kanaka Mayilanchi" (female version)	Rafeeq Ahammed	Mythili	4:16
4.	"Kanaka Mayilanchi" (male version)	Rafeeq Ahammed	Shahabaz Aman	4:16
5.	"Manchadi Meghame"	Rajeev Nair	Gayatri Asokan, Amal Antony	3:14
Total length:				19:03

== Release ==
Loham was initially scheduled to be released in July 2015 during Ramadan, but it had to be postponed until 20 August because of delays in post-production. The film was then scheduled to open in India on 20 August 2015 as a festival release during the Onam season.

On 20 August 2015, the film was released on 141 screens in Kerala, and to other theatres in India on 21 August 2015. The film's debut in the Middle East took place on 27 August 2015. It also opened in theatres in the UAE and UK on 28 August 2015. Rights for television broadcast was sold as a joint venture to Asianet and Kairali TV for ₹6 crore and ₹1 crore respectively.

=== Box office ===
The film grossed ₹3.5 crore (US$360,000) on its opening day in India, with ₹2.20 crore (US$230,000) from Kerala box office receipts alone. Loham created a new opening day record in Malayalam that surpassed the previous record set by Casanovva in 2012. The film was released in Chennai and collected ₹0.03 crore (US$3,100).

=== Critical reception ===
Rejath R.G of Kerala Kaumudi said, "Renjith has beautifully conceived the film", and praised the technical aspects with special mention to Kunjunni's camera work and the three "beautiful" songs composed by Sreevalsan. He summarised it as "a watchable good film that could have been much better if the director paid a little more attention to the screenplay. The problem is that it loses steam here and there, particularly in the post-interval sequences". Deccan Chronicle rated the film 2.5 out of 5 and said, "Any of [Mohanlal's] fans, who are exposed to thrillers of Hollywood and Bollywood like Ocean's 11 and Special 26 will lose the thrill soon. There is nothing commendable about the script or cinematography or music", but he praised Mohanlal's action sequences and car chasing scenes, Siddique and his companion's performances, and Mythili and Musthafa's "heart touching" moments. He called the message of the film "socially relevant" and "effective".

Pramod Thomas of The New Indian Express commented, "Mollywood has been in an experimental mode of late. Unfortunately, movies like Loham are many laps behind. . . . When Megalomaniac directors decide to live in the shadow of their past glory, films like Loham happen". Parech C. Palicha of Rediff.com commented, "Loham lacks lustre, and is not original at all". Sify praised the performance of Mohanlal and the humour of Siddique and Soubin Saheer but criticised the script, saying, "Loham is about a topical subject, but it is far from engaging". Raj Vikram of Metromatinee said that technically the film is slick with well shot sequences. "Mohanlal is the lifeblood of the movie, and he pulls off an easy role by his standards with characteristic panache . . . Loham is not among the best works of director Renjith but is far better than some of his forgettable duds". Behindwoods rated the film two-and-a-half out of five stars and wrote that "if you go keeping your expectations under check, in spite of the big names involved in the movie, Loham is a one-time watch drama".
