= Jayan Cherthala =

Indian actor

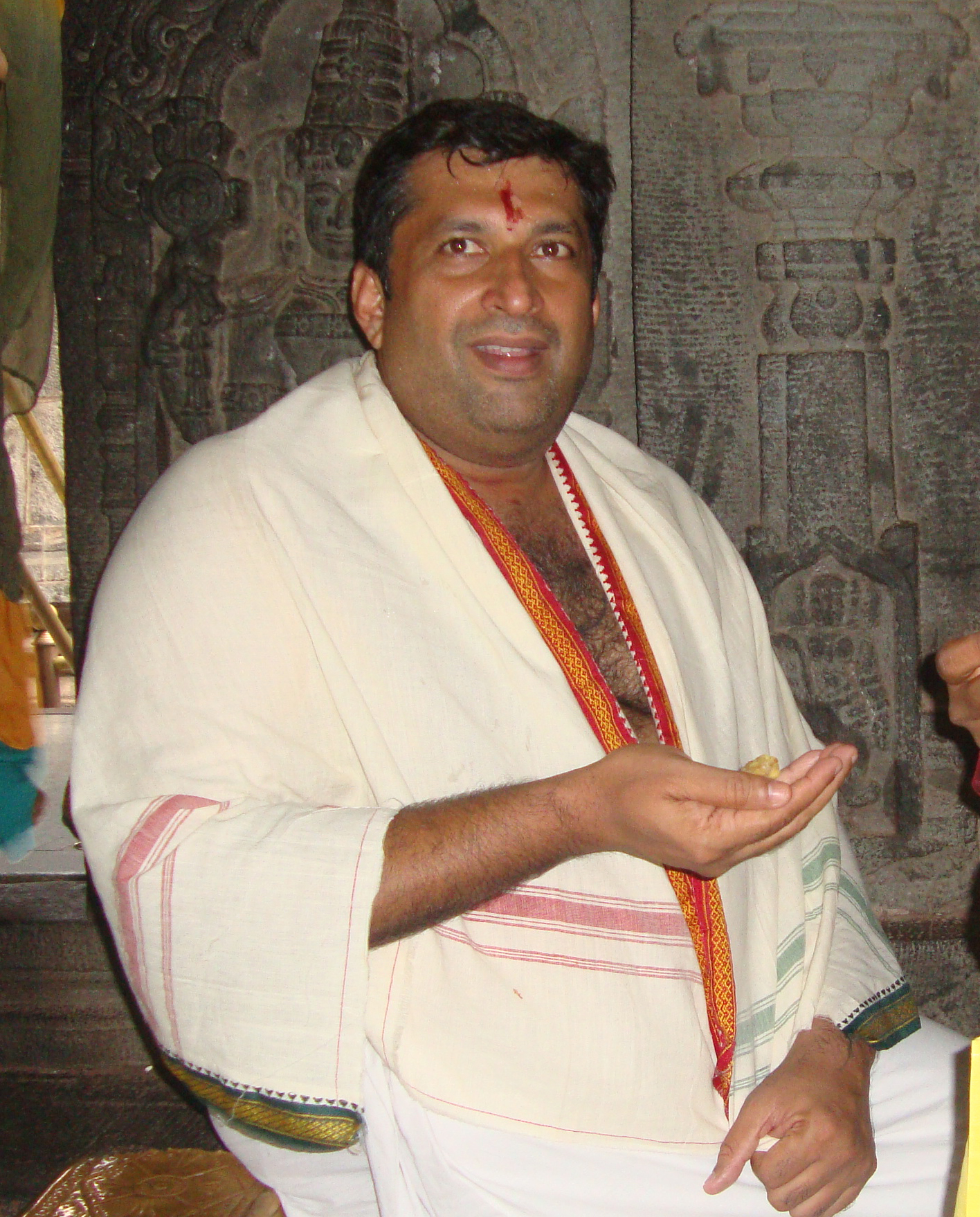
- Jayan Cherthala in 2015
- Born: 21 March 1971 (age 55); Cherthala, Alappuzha, Kerala, India

Jayan Cherthala is an Indian actor in Malayalam cinema. He is from Cherthala, near Alappuzha, Kerala in India. He has performed in more than two dozen movies in Malayalam, and TV serials. He is the state president of Kerala Sarva Kala Sangam (KSKS) affiliated to AITUC.

== Personal life ==
Jayan's father, Raveendranathan Nair, was a teacher. His mother, Sarala Bai and sister Sindhu are teachers. His stage name was adopted from the village he came from, Cherthala. He is married to Jayasree and the couple have a son, Karthik Shiva.

== Filmography ==
Key
†	Denotes films that have not yet been released

- All films are in Malayalam language unless otherwise noted.

Year	Title	Role	Notes
2005	Chandrolsavam	Chandrashekharan	
2006	Prajapathi	Jagathan	
2007	Vinodayathra	TV Channel Reporter	
2007	Black Cat	Muthaliyar	
2008	Innathe Chintha Vishayam	Jayarajan	
2008	Parunthu	Kallayi Azeez	
2008	Annan Thambi	Astrologer Madhava Panickar	
2008	Roudram	CI Jalapalan	
2009	Winter		
2009	Pazhassi Raja	Panikkassery Kumaran Nambiar	
2010	Nallavan	Raghavan	
2010	Drona	Maniyankottu Jayan	
2011	Beautiful	Driver Karunan	
2011	Aazhakadal	Monachan	
2011	Christian Brothers	Rajan Thampi	
2012	The King and the Commissioner	Raman Madhavan	
2013	Romans	Sub-Inspector Eanashu	
2014	Njan		
2014	John Paul Vaathil Thurakkunnu		
2014	Njaan		
2014	Apothecary		
2015	Loham	Commissioner Varghese IPS	
2015	Utopiayile Rajavu	Sudhakaran Pillai	
2015	Swargathekkal Sundaram		
2016	Ghostvilla		
2016	Dhanayathra		
2016	Maanasaandarapetta Yezdi		
2017	Chef	Customer	
2017	Sherlock Toms	P. Sundaram	
2017	Konjam Konjam	Jayakumar	
2017	Achayans	Georgekutty	
2018	Oru Kuttanadan Blog	Paulachan	
2018	Kaitholachathan		
2018	B.Tech	Subramaniam	
2018	Vikadakumaran	Adv. Harihara Iyer alias Swami	
2018	Ira	Fr. Alex	
2019	Mamangam	Bharathan	
2019	Adhyarathri	Kumaran	
2019	Subharathri	Jayapalan	
2019	Sei	Sudalaimani	
2019	Prakashante Metro	Sultan	
2019	Pattabhiraman	Solomon	
2019	Madhura Raja	Constable Chandran	
2019	Prashna Parihara Shala		
2020	Maniyarayile Ashokan	Chathu Nair	
2021	One	Vishwambharan, Minister for Culture	
2021	Saajan Bakery Since 1962	Philipose	
2022	Pathonpatham Noottandu		
2022	Mirchi Masala		
2023	Kallanum Bhagavathiyum		
2023	Jaladhara Pumpset Since 1962	Magistrate	
2023	Garudan	EX-Minister Mathew	
2023	Rani		
2024	Mayamma		
2025	L Jagadamma Ezham Class B		
2026	Bhishmar		

== Dubbing work ==
Year	Movie	Dubbed for	Character
2000	Kinnara Thumbikal	Vipin Roy	Gopu
2002	Valkannadi	Anil Murali	Thamban
2002	Puthooramputhri Unniyarcha	Devan	Chandu Chevakar
2017	Mersal (Malayalam dubbed Version)	Sathyaraj	DCP Ratnavel
2024	Amaran (Malayalam dubbed Version)	Rahul Bose	Colonel Amit Singh Dabas

== Television serials ==
- 2003-2004: Swapnam
- 2004: Avicharitham
- 2005: Kayamkulam Kochunni
- 2006: Summer in America
- 2007-2009: Ente Manasaputhri as Thobiyas
- 2009: vigraham
- 2010:Snehatheeram
- 2015-2016: Eshwaran Saakshyiyayi
- 2015: Junior Chanakyan
