= Aparna Gopinath =

Indian actress

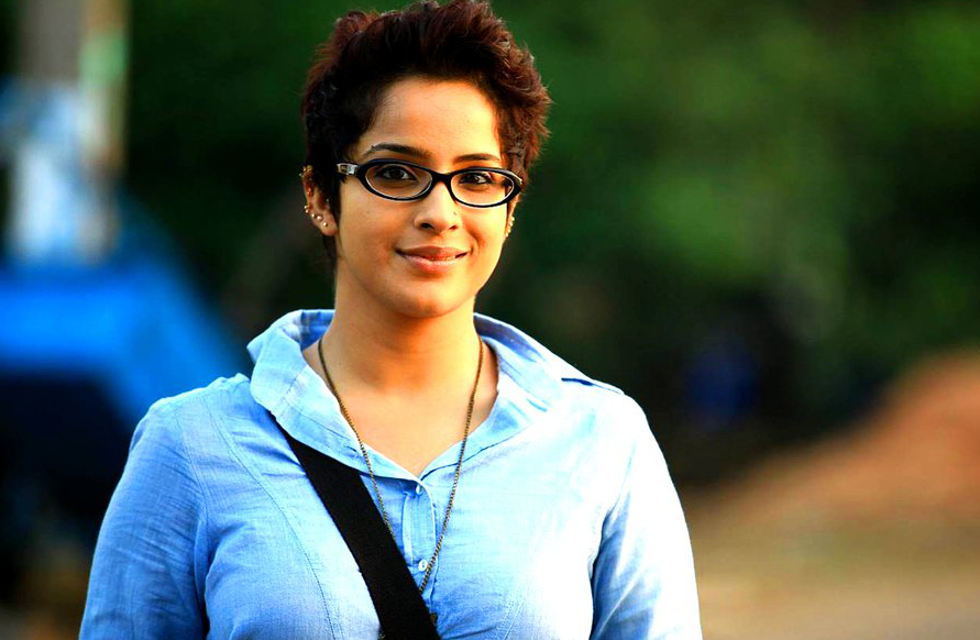
- Aparna in 2014
- Born: Kozhikode
- Occupations: Film Actress; Theatre Actress
- Years active: 2013–2019

Aparna Gopinath is a former Indian film actress and theatre artist. She debuted in 2013, with the Malayalam film ABCD: American-Born Confused Desi opposite Dulquer Salmaan.

== Early life ==
Aparna was born into a Malayali family in Chennai. She was a theatre artist and contemporary dancer before her acting debut. She has associated herself with Koothu-P-Pattarai, an avant-garde theatre movement of Chennai, and had also acted in renowned plays like Six Characters in Search of an Author, Woyzeck, Moonshine, Sky Toffee, Sangadi Arinjo based on seven short stories of Vaikom Muhammad Basheer and several Shakespearean plays.

== Career ==
=== Movie career ===
She debuted in movies with Martin Prakkat's ABCD: American-Born Confused Desi which became a super hit. She played the role of Madhumitha, a college student and the love interest of Dulquer Salmaan in the movie. Her second movie as heroine was Asif Ali starrer Bicycle Thieves.

She played the female lead in Mamas' Mannar Mathai Speaking 2 which is a sequel to 1995 cult comedy Mannar Mathai Speaking and Boban Samuel's Happy Journey (2014) starring Jayasurya. She played the role of a junior journalist in director Venu's film Munnariyippu starring Mammootty which fetched rave reviews for her acting skills. She had signed Mohanlal-Priyadarshan film Ammu to Ammu but it was later shelved due to production difficulties. In 2016, she completed Kranthi which saw no theatrical release.

=== Theatre career ===
In Chennai, she was active in English theatre and was a part of plays like Six Characters in Search of an Author and worked with various theatre groups including Masquerade, The Little Theatre, Magic Lantern, Madras Players, Koothu–p-Pattarai. Over the years, she has directed and acted in over 50 plays. Her favorite remains Moonshine And Skytoffeeby, by a Chennai-based group called Perch directed by Rajeev Krishnan.

In 2014, she was a part of Under The Mangosteen Tree, an adaption of a Vaikom Muhammad Basheer tale.

== Awards ==
- 2013 – TTK Prestige-Vanitha Film Awards – Best Debutante actress – ABCD: American-Born Confused Desi
- 2013 – Amrita Film Awards for Best New Face – ABCD: American-Born Confused Desi
- 2014 – Asiavision Movie Awards (special Jury Award) – Munnariyippu
- 2014 – Nominated – 3rd South Indian International Movie Awards for Best Female Debutant – ABCD: American-Born Confused Desi
- 2014 – Nominated -Asianet Film Awards for Best New Face of the Year (Female) – ABCD: American-Born Confused Desi
- 2015 – Nominated – Asianet Film Awards for Best Actress – Munnariyippu
- 2015 – Nominated – Campus Choice Cine Awards for Most Popular Actress – Munnariyippu
- 2015 – Nominated – Filmfare Award for Best Actress – Malayalam – Munnariyippu
- 2016 – Nominated – Filmfare Award for Best Supporting Actress – Malayalam – Charlie
- 2015 – Nominated – 4th South Indian International Movie Awards for Best Actress – Munnariyippu
- 2016 – 2nd IIFA Utsavam for Performance in a Supporting Role – Female -Malayalam – Charlie

== Filmography ==
Key
| † | Denotes films that have not yet been released |

| Year | Title | Role(s) | Notes | Ref. |
|---|---|---|---|---|
| 2013 | ABCD: American-Born Confused Desi | Madhumitha | Debut film | |
| 2013 | Bicycle Thieves | Meera | | |
| 2014 | Mannar Mathai Speaking 2 | Nithya | | |
| 2014 | Happy Journey | Ziya | | |
| 2014 | Gangster | Lilly | | |
| 2014 | Munnariyippu | Anjali | | |
| 2015 | Onnam Loka Mahayudham | ACP Tara Mathew | | |
| 2015 | Charlie | Dr. Kani | | |
| 2016 | School Bus | Aparna | | |
| 2017 | Sakhavu | Neethi | | |
| 2018 | Mazhayathu | Anitha | | |
| 2019 | Oru Nakshathramulla Aakasham | Uma | | |
| 2019 | Safe | Shreya Sreedharan | | |
