= Paleri Manikyam: Oru Pathirakolapathakathinte Katha (novel) =

Book by T. P. Rajeevan

Paleri Manikyam: Oru Pathirakolapathakathinte Katha (Undying Echoes of Silence)
- First edition
- Author: T. P. Rajeevan
- Language: Malayalam
- Genre: Mystery
- Publisher: Current Books (Original); Amaryllis (English)
- Publication date: 2009 (Original); 2013 (English)
- Publication place: India
- Media type: Print (Paperback)
- Pages: 304 (Original); 382 (English)

Paleri Manikyam: Oru Pathirakolapathakathinte Katha is a Malayalam-language mystery novel by T. P. Rajeevan (Thachom Poyil Rajeevan). It was originally serialised in Mathrubhumi Weekly and was published as a book by Current Books. Paleri Manikyam was first written in English when the author was residing in Iowa, United States. He wrote it in Malayalam after coming back to Kerala. However, the English version, titled Undying Echoes of Silence, was released in August 2013 only.

Paleri Manikyam: Oru Pathirakolapathakathinte Katha literally translates to Manikyam of Paleri: A Midnight Murder Story and is based on the true story of the first recorded murder case that was registered after the formation of the first democratically elected communist government in Kerala.

== Plot summary ==
The novel is set in Kerala in 1950s-an era of transition from feudal system to modern democracy. Manikyam, a young Thiyya girl, comes from the neighbouring village to Paleri as the wife of Pokkan, the assistant sorcerer of the village. She was found dead a few days after her marriage. Her close relatives suspected it to be a murder, and investigations were carried out. A few people were suspected, arrested and questioned, only to be released by the court which described the prosecution's case as flawed. With no further investigation, the case had, since then, gone cold over the years, eventually acquiring the status of an unsolved mystery. Around 50 years later, a detective living in New Delhi, sets out on a journey to Paleri, which is also his birthplace, hoping to solve this mystery. The story is narrated in first person by the investigator.

== Translation ==
- Thachom Poyil Rajeevan (2013). Undying Echoes of Silence. Amaryllis. ISBN 9789381506141.

== Film adaptation ==
The novel was adapted into a film with the same title in 2009. It was scripted and directed by Ranjith and starred Mammootty in three different roles alongside Mythili, Shwetha Menon, Sreenivasan and Gowri Munjal.
