= Ezhu Sundara Rathrikal =

- Promotional Poster
- Directed by: Lal Jose
- Written by: James Albert
- Produced by: Rathish Ambat; Jerry Jhon; Prakash Varma
- Starring: Dileep; Rima Kallingal; Murali Gopy
- Cinematography: Pradeesh M. Varma; K. U. Mohanan
- Edited by: Ranjan Abraham
- Music by: Prashant Pillai
- Production companies: Small Town Cinema; LJ Films
- Distributed by: LJ Films
- Release date: 18 December 2013
- Country: India
- Language: Malayalam

Ezhu Sundara Rathrikal (transl. Seven Beautiful Nights) is a 2013 Malayalam-language romantic comedy film directed by Lal Jose and starring Dileep, Rima Kallingal, Parvathy Nambiar and Murali Gopy. The film follows a sequence of events that unfolds during a course of seven days and nights of a bridegroom. It depicts how Aby Mathews' (Dileep) life is tossed over when he happens to meet his ex-girlfriend before his wedding day.

This movie did an average performance in box office.

== Plot ==
Aby Mathew is an ad filmmaker who is about to marry his model, Ann. Aby throws a bachelor party for his bunch of friends, including Abid, Franco, Daisy and a few others just seven days before the wedding. Through Abid, Aby learns of his ex-flame Sini's presence in the city with whom he had a fall-out just a few days before their wedding. An inebriated Aby decides to go to Sini to invite her to his wedding. Sini talks highly of her husband Alex, a boxer, with whom she has a son as well. Aby also boasts of his fiancée. During this meeting, Aby accidentally leaves his packet of cigarettes behind, which is then taken by Sini's son to school. On discovering the cigarette packet in school, the principal calls Sini and her husband for disciplinary action against their son. Sini, however, realizes that she cannot go to school with Alex since that would mean telling him about Aby's visit which she had kept as a secret. Sini pleads to Aby to accompany her to school posing as her husband. Things take an ugly turn when they are seen together by a stranger Baiju Raj.

== Cast ==
- Dileep as Aby Mathew
- Murali Gopy as Tyson Alex, a boxer and Sini's husband
- Rima Kallingal as Sini Alex (P.P. Ramani), Aby's ex-girlfriend & Tyson's wife
- Parvathy Nambiar as Ann, Aby's bride
- Tini Tom as Franco
- Harishree Ashokan as Abid
- Suraj Venjaramoodu as Prem Raj
- Sekhar Menon as Vivek
- Pavithra Menon as Anju (model), Franco's mistress
- Vijayaraghavan as City Police Commissioner Varghese IPS
- Sreejith Ravi as Christy Perera
- Sreenivasan as himself
- Liimal G Padath as Aby's Friend
- Arun as Roy
- Ramu as Mathew, Aby's father
- Anil 'Scene Stealer' Rajgopal as Baijuraj
- Shiju as Charlie, Alex's friend
- Majeed as Adv. George Isaac
- Praveena as Dr. Daisy, Franco's wide
- Suja Menon as Vivek's wife
- Ambika Mohan as Susanamma, Aby's mother
- Surabhi Lakshmi as Jayalakshmi
- Krishna Praba as Manjusha
- Deepika Mohan as Principal's wife

Director Anoop Sathyan appears in a cameo role as a man trying to hook up with Sini when she is waiting for Alex in the restaurant. Anoop appears in the scene as he was working as an associate of Lal Jose in the movie at the time.

== Production ==
Dileep was chosen to play the lead role of an ad filmmaker. It is the seventh film of Lal Jose with Dileep in lead role and the second with writer James Albert. The film was produced by Small Town Cinema.

== Reception ==
The film received mixed reviews from the critics. Sify said "Ezhu Sundara Rathrikal gives you the feeling that there is a basic storyline here, which could have been fine as a feel good entertainer, if it was made well. In the current form, all that this confusion drama succeeds in is to leave you more confused". The Times of India rated the film 3/5 and said "Lal Jose intently tries to hold the complexities with a sense of triviality. He does away with tears and piano at times of grave emotional crises and would instead squeeze in cartoonish sequences. The light-hearted treatment works to an extent, but not for long as the narrative is crippled by a sluggishness that results from a poorly conceived script". Filmibeat wrote "There are some scenes where you can see the typical Lal Jose touch in the movie. But whether the director have fully succeeded to satisfy the viewers, it's a no. Still, Ezhu Sundara Rathrikal is a feel good movie which has its moments here and there" and rated 3/5.

== Box office ==
The film was an average grosser at the box office. Ezhu Sundara Rathrikal received ₹5.6 crore as satellite rights from a Malayalam TV channel, the highest amount for a Malayalam film at that time.

== Soundtrack ==
Ezhu Sundara Rathrikal

Soundtrack album by Prashant Pillai
- Language: Malayalam
- Label: East Cost Audios

No.	Title	Singer(s)	Length
1.	"Koode Irikkaam"	Haricharan, Gayathri	5:03
2.	"Nakshathram Pol"	Preethi Pillai	4:03
3.	"Orkaathe Mayaathe"	Karthik, Charan Raj, Gowry Lekshmi	4:55
4.	"Pettidaam Aarum"	Aalaap Raju, Sankar Sharma	3:24
