= Parvathy Nambiar =

Indian actress and dancer

- Born: Payyanur, Kannur, Kerala, India
- Occupations: Actor; Dancer; Theatre artist
- Years active: 2013–present
- Notable work: Ezhu Sundara Rathrikal (2013)
- Spouse: Vineeth Menon (m. 2020)

Parvathy Nambiar is an Indian actress and dancer known for her work in Malayalam Cinema.

== Personal life ==
She got engaged to Vineeth Menon in 2019 and married him in 2020.

== Filmography ==
Year	Title	Role	Notes
2013	Ezhu Sundara Rathrikal	Ann	
2014	1 by Two	Uncredited role	
2015	Rajamma @ Yahoo	Najumma	
2016	Leela	Leela	
2016	Ghost Villa	Elsa	Also Singer for the song "Njanoru Bougainvillea "
2017	Sathya	Milan	
2017	Puthan Panam	Artist	
2017	Careful	Anna Mariyam	
2018	Kinar	Razeena	
2018	Keni	Razeena	Tamil film
2019	Madhura Raja	Daisy	Cameo Appearance
2019	Pattabhiraman	Kani	

== Television ==
Year	Title	Role	Notes
2022	Parayam Nedam	Participant	
2021	Comedy Masters	Host	Replaced Gopika
2021	Star Magic	Mentor	
2020	Ningalkkum Aakaam Kodeeshwaran	Contestant	
2018	Lalitha 50	Dancer	
2018	Asianet Film Awards	Dancer	
2017	Onnum Onnum Moonu	Herself	
2017	Yuva Film Awards	Dancer	
2017	Suvarnam Hariharam	Dancer	
2017	MACTA Pranma Sandhya	Dancer	
2017	Comedy Super Nite 2	Herself	
2016	Mohanam 2016	Dancer	
2016	Kerala State Film Awards	Dancer	
2016	Comedy Super Nite	Herself	
2011	Mammootty The Best Actor	Contestant	Reality show Finalist

== Play ==
Year	Title	Role	Notes
2014	Makaradwajan	Makari	
