= Swargathekkal Sundaram =

- Theatrical poster
- Directed by: Manoj Aravindakshan
- Screenplay by: Rajesh Raghavan
- Story by: Rajesh Raghavan
- Produced by: Shaji Thomas
- Starring: Sreenivasan; Lal; Joy Mathew; Mythili
- Cinematography: Sameer Haq
- Edited by: Ayoob Khan
- Music by: Rakesh Kesavan; Deepak Dev (Background Score)
- Production company: Ponnu Films
- Release date: 2015
- Country: India
- Language: Malayalam

Swargathekkal Sundaram is a 2015 Malayalam film directed by debutant Manoj Aravindakshan. The film was produced by Shaji Thomas. It stars Sreenivasan, Lal, Joy Mathew and Mythili in the main roles. Manoj Aravindakshan was a long time associate to Joshiy. The story and screenplay are written by Rajesh Raghavan. The songs are composed by Rakesh Kesavan and cinematography is handled by Sameer Haq.

== Cast ==
- Sreenivasan as Satheesh
- Lal as Maniyan
- Joy Mathew as Lopez, Panchami Bar MD
- Mythili as Touchings Jaya
- Sreejith Ravi as NRI
- Asha Aravind as Jalaja
- Muthumani as Dr. Renu
- Jayasankar as Picha Vasu
- Master Aaryan as Aadithyan
- Mahesh as Dr. Philip Samuel
- Jayan Cherthala as Mohanan
- Jaffer idukki as Tip Babu
- Niyas Bakker as Earth Biju
- Vishnu Unnikrishnan as Kavi
- Jayaraj Century as Member
- Unnikrishnan Palakkad as Cook Basheer
- Abraham Koshy as Koshy
- Mathew Joy as Stephen
- Askar Ali as Kumar
- Favour Francis as Sub Inspector
- Jolly Moothedan as Petty George
- Shinu Nedumbassery as Peter

== Production ==
The film was produced by Shaji Thomas under the banner of Ponnu Films. This is the directorial debut of Manoj Aravindakshan who was a long time associate to Joshiy. The official trailer for the movie was released on 27 April 2015.

The songs were composed by Rakesh Kesavan while the background was handled by Deepak Dev.

== Release ==
The movie was released in theatres on 22 May 2015.
