= Paleri Manikyam: Oru Pathirakolapathakathinte Katha (film) =

- Theatrical release poster
- Directed by: Ranjith
- Screenplay by: Ranjith
- Based on: Paleri Manikyam: Oru Pathirakolapathakathinte Katha by T. P. Rajeevan
- Produced by: A. V. Anoop; Maha Subair
- Starring: Mammootty; Shwetha Menon
- Cinematography: Manoj Pillai
- Edited by: Vijay Sankar
- Music by: Sharreth; Bijibal
- Production company: AVA Productions
- Distributed by: Varnachithra Big Screen
- Release date: 5 December 2009
- Running time: 155 minutes
- Country: India
- Language: Malayalam

Paleri Manikyam: Oru Pathirakolapathakathinte Katha (transl. Manikyam of Paleri: A Midnight Murder Story) is a 2009 Indian Malayalam-language mystery film written and directed by Ranjith, starring Mammootty, Shwetha Menon and Mythili. It is based on the novel of the same name by T. P. Rajeevan. Mammooty plays three characters, including the main antagonist in the film. This was Mythili's film debut. Ranjith also introduced about thirty Malayalam stage artists through this film. The film tells the story of a private detective, who returns to his birthplace, a village called Paleri, to solve a mysterious murder that occurred on the night he was born.

The film won four Kerala State Film Awards including the Best Film Award. Mammootty won his fifth Kerala State Film Award for Best Actor for playing three roles Ahmed Haji, Haridas, and Khalid Ahmed in this movie. Shwetha Menon also won her first Kerala State Film Award for Best Actress for her performance in this film.

== Plot ==
The story revolves around the unnatural death of a young woman named Manikyam in Paleri, a small village in northern Kerala, in the late 1950s. Although her in-laws claimed that she died after having a seizure, examination of the body revealed it to be a case of murder and rape. The police charged three locals with the murder, who were released by the court which described the prosecution's case as flawed. With no further investigation, the case had gone cold, eventually acquiring the status of an unsolved mystery.

Around 52 years later, Haridas, a detective living in New Delhi, sets out on a journey to Paleri hoping to solve this mystery. Apparently, he was born in the same village on the same night when Manikyam was killed. He is joined by Sarayu, a crime analyst.

Most of the clues and knowledge of Balan Nair and Keshavan lead him to zero in on Ahmed Haji, a cruel feudal landlord who lived in Paleri during that period. It was obvious why his name did not figure in police reports from that era; he was so powerful and influential in Paleri at that time. Slowly, as things become clear, Haridas deduces that the murderer is Ahmed Haji, who realised that Khalid Ahmed, Haji's first wife's eldest son had raped the girl and left her alive. Velayudhan is tasked with disposing the body and further kills an accidental witness at the river bank. Velayudhan and his help then hung the body near Manikyam's house and even changed the method again by attempting to make the death because of injuries during a seizure.

== Cast ==
- Mammootty in triple role as:
  - Murikkumkunnath Ahamed Haji, a wicked feudal landlord of ancient Paleri who is a womaniser (main antagonist)
  - Haridas, a private detective who is Haji's son and Khalid's half brother (main protagonist)
  - Khalid Ahamed, an elderly scholar who is Haji's eldest son
- Mythili as Manikyam
- Shweta Menon as Cheeru
- Gowri Munjal as Sarayu
- Sreenivasan as Keshavan
  - Musthafa as young Keshavan
- Siddique as Balan, a present-day native
- Vijayan V. Nair as Velayudhan
- T. Damodaran as K. P. Hamsa
- Suresh Krishna as DYSP Y. Madhavan
- Sasi Kalinga as DYSP Mohandas Manalath, the old day cop
- Sreejith as Pokkan
- Parvathi T. as Judge
- T. A. Razzaq as a Ghazal Singer (Guest appearance)

== Production ==
The novel, titled Paleri Manikyam: Oru Pathirakolapathakathinte Katha itself, was written by director Ranjith's friend T. P. Rajeevan and was published in the Mathrubhumi Weekly a year before onwards. The novel was based on the true story of Manikyam, who was raped and murdered in the early 1950s. According to Rajeevan as well as the film crew, this was the first recorded crime in Kerala.

=== Casting ===
The original cast included Mammootty to play all the three lead roles. Ranjith cast Shwetha Menon as Cheeru, an important character that required the potential of such an experienced actor. Ranjith introduced television anchor and model Mythili, who played the central character Manikyam in the film. Dhanya Mary Varghese was also approached for this role but she instantly rejected.

Ranjith, who is an alumnus of School of Drama, Thrissur, also incorporated thirty experienced stage actors of Malayalam drama in this film. They were selected from five hundred odd theatre actors who auditioned for the film in Kozhikode. Actor Murali Menon was the casting director. Among the thirty two selected, Sreejith, Vijayan V. Nair and Musthafa were three who played major roles in the film. Sreejith, an amateur actor at Kaiveli, Kozhikode, who became famous through a reality show, played Pokkan, the husband of Manikyam and a lunatic. Musthafa played younger Keshavan, a character enacted by veteran Sreenivasan in the later stages. He was one of the finalists of a reality show telecast on Amrita TV, of which Ranjith was a judge. Vijayan V. Nair, played Velayudhan, henchman of Ahmed Haji, another character played by Mammootty. Though he has acted in telefilms and tele serials, this was his debut as an actor. "I had cast Vijayan as Velayudhan long ago. Murali Menon, who had groomed the theatre actors at the workshop, had told me about him some time ago. I was confident that he would be ideal for the powerful character of Velayudhan," says Ranjith, who is delighted that he has been able to give Malayalam cinema some exciting new talents.

== Music ==
The original score and title track of the film was composed by Bijibal while the only song was composed by Sharreth, Ranjith's previous collaborator in Thirakkatha. The score as well as the songs received notably mixed responses. However, the main theme song enjoyed the status of a chartbuster, thanks for the well received plot of the movie. The lyrics were penned by Rafeeq Ahamed (Thum Jho) and T.P Rajeevan (title song).

== Release ==
The film was released on 5 December 2009. It opened in forty centres in Kerala, which is half the number of usual superstar releases. It was also screened at the International Film Festival of India that year. The film was re-released in theatres on 4 October 2024 in a 4K restoration with Dolby Atmos sound, after its originally scheduled re-release date of 20 September 2024 was postponed. The re-release brought the classic mystery drama back to cinemas worldwide.

== Reception ==
Nowrunning is all praise for the film and comments that "Ranjith's Manickyam is a rarity of a film that exceeds expectations and offers a psychedelic high for the viewer. There would be no surprise if it ignites some sort of a controversy for the boldness that it displays. For the discerning viewer though, this might perhaps be one of the best films to have come out this year." A review on Rediff.com commented that "Very rarely does a film satisfy our expectations. But director Ranjith's latest Malayalam film Paleri Manikyam: Oru Pathira Kolapathakathinte Katha does. The film is near perfect with minor ignorable blemishes." Sify called the movie "one of the finest films in Malayalam history" and commented that "Paleri Manikyam: Oru Pathira Kolapathakathinte Kadha is one film that will haunt you days after you've left the theatres. It's a gem that comes not too often and the least you can do to appreciate it is to watch it at the cinemas, at the earliest!"

== Awards ==
Year	Award	Category	Recipient	Result	Notes	Ref.
2009	Kerala State Film Awards	Best Film	Paleri Manikyam: Oru Pathirakolapathakathinte Katha	Won	received by A. V. Anoop, Maha Subair, Ranjith	
2009	Kerala State Film Awards	Best Actor	Mammootty	Won		
2009	Kerala State Film Awards	Best Actress	Shwetha Menon	Won		
2009	Kerala State Film Awards	Best Makeup Artist	Ranjith Ambady, S. George	Won		
2009	Asianet Film Awards	Best Director	Ranjith	Won		
2009	Asianet Film Awards	Millennium Actor	Mammootty	Won		
2009	Asianet Film Awards	Best Supporting Actress	Shwetha Menon	Won		
2009	Vanitha Film Awards	Best Director	Ranjith	Won		
2009	Vanitha Film Awards	Best Actor	Mammootty	Won		
2009	Vanitha Film Awards	Best Supporting Actress	Shwetha Menon	Won		
2009	Surya Film Awards	Best Actor	Mammootty	Won		
2009	Surya Film Awards	Best Actress	Shwetha Menon	Won		
2009	Surya Film Awards	Best Background Score	Bijibal	Won		
2009	Surya Film Awards	Best Makeup	S. George	Won		

== Controversies ==
In 2024, Actress Sreelekha Mitra had made allegations against director Ranjith that she was sexually exploited in the audition of this film.
