= Mythili =

Indian actress

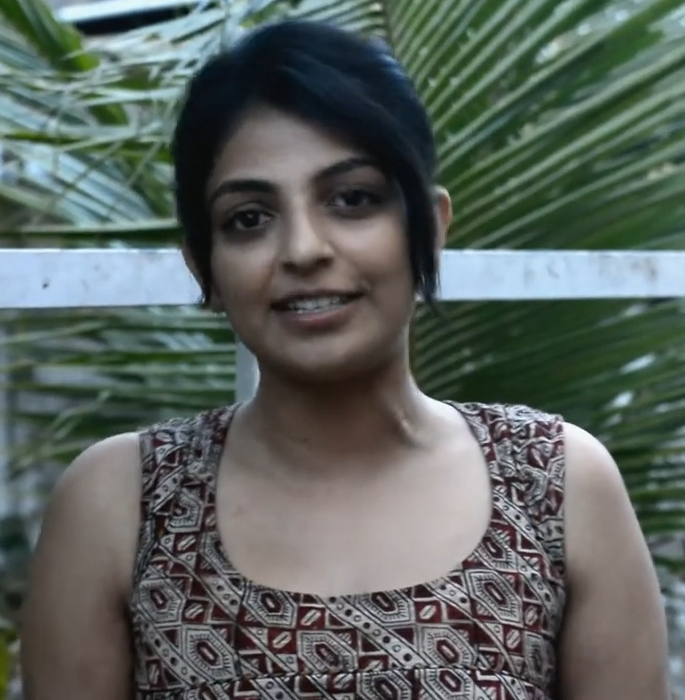
- Mythili in 2018
- Born: Brighty Balachandran; Konni, Kerala, India
- Years active: 2009–2022
- Spouse: Sampath (m. 2022)

Brighty Balachandran, better known by her stage name Mythili, is an Indian actress who appears in Malayalam films. She made her debut in the 2009 Malayalam film Paleri Manikyam: Oru Pathirakolapathakathinte Katha which stars Mammootty in lead role.

== Early life ==
Mythili (Brighty Balachandran) was born in Konni, Pathanamthitta in Kerala, India. Her father is Balachandran, an accountant and mother Beena, she has a brother named Bibin. Mythili married to Sampath on 28 April 2022 who works as an Architect.

She did her schooling till the seventh grade at St. Mary's High School, Eliyarackal, Konni and later in Amrita VHSS, Konni, and her higher secondary education was at Government HSS, Konni. She studied flight attendant course and has a degree in Bachelor of Commerce. She is also a trained classical dancer.

== Career ==
She debuted in Ranjith's crime drama film Paleri Manikyam: Oru Pathirakolapathakathinte Katha. She acted in Salt N' Pepper which subsequently earned her a nomination for Best Supporting Actress at 59th Filmfare Awards South. She made her playback singing debut with Malayalam thriller Loham (The Yellow Metal).

== Filmography ==
Year	Title	Role	Notes
2009	Kerala Cafe	Young lady in the cafe	Debut film Segment : Happy Journey
2009	Paleri Manikyam: Oru Pathirakolapathakathinte Katha	Manikkyam	
2009	Chattambinadu	Meenakshi	
2010	Nallavan	Malli	
2010	Shikkar	Gayathri	
2011	Kanakompathu	Geethu	
2011	Salt N' Pepper	Meenakshi	Nominated—Filmfare Award for Best Supporting Actress – Malayalam; Won-Asianet Film Awards 2012 :Best Star pair & Asiavision Awards 2011:Special mention
2012	Njanum Ente Familiyum	Sophy	
2012	Ee Adutha Kalathu	Remani	Nominated—Filmfare Award for Best Supporting Actress – Malayalam
2012	Mayamohini	Sangeetha	
2012	Naughty Professor	Herself	Special appearance in the song "Jiga Jinga"
2012	Bhoomiyude Avakashikal	Sunitha	
2012	Poppins	Gauri	
2012	Matinee	Savithri	Also playback singer ("Ayalathe Veettile")
2013	Breaking News Live	Sneha	
2013	Cowboy	Krishna	
2013	Honey Bee	Proposed lady	Cameo appearance
2013	Kadal Kadannu Oru Maathukutty	Herself	Cameo appearance
2013	Black Berry	Sreedevi	
2013	Nadodimannan	Rima	
2013	Vedivazhipadu	Vidya	
2014	God's Own Country	Abhirami	
2014	Villali Veeran	Aishwarya	
2014	Njaan	Devayaniyamma (Devu)	
2015	Swargathekkal Sundaram	Jaya	
2015	Loham	Rafeeq's wife	Also playback singer ("Kanaka Mayilanchi")
2016	Mohavalayam	Prameela	
2017	God Say	MagdalenaGomez	
2017	Crossroad	Photographer	In the segment:Pakshikalude Maanam
2017	Sinjar	Suhara	
2018	Pathirakalam	Jahanara	
2019	Oru Kaatil Oru Paykappal	Sara	
2019	Mera Naam Shaji	Laila Shaji	
2022	Chattambi	Raaji	
2022	C/O 56 APO	Nadia	Selected as one of the World Top 25 Straight 8 film of 2022. Theatrically Released all over UK and Exhibited US, Cannes, Portugal, Brazil, India and several countries.

== Television ==
Year	Show	Role	Channel	Notes
2006	Gaanasallapam	Anchor	NCV channel	Local channel Konni
