= Pradeshika Varthakal =

- Directed by: Kamal
- Written by: Ranjith
- Produced by: S. Shivaprasadh
- Starring: Jayaram; Parvathy Jayaram; Jagathy Sreekumar; Innocent
- Cinematography: Saloo George
- Edited by: G. Murali
- Music by: Johnson
- Production companies: Sree Sai Productions; Sharadha Films
- Distributed by: Central Pictures
- Release date: 25 October 1989
- Country: India
- Language: Malayalam

Pradeshika Varthakal (transl. Local news) is a 1989 Indian Malayalam-language comedy film directed by Kamal and produced by S. Sivaprasad. The film stars Jayaram, Parvathy, Jagathy Sreekumar, and Innocent, with a score composed by Johnson.

== Plot ==
The movie opens with Kallan Krishnan and Kallan Kochappy, two thieves being driven out of the village. Keshavunni, a villager opens a new film theatre in his village. After keeping Jabbar as his operator, Keshavunni begins work. The first film is attended by almost the entire village, including Keshavunni's father Kunjambu Nair, Fr. Antony Paramel, and Velichappadu. After a mix-up in films, they face criticism from the entire crowd. Keshavunni continues his business accompanied by his friend Thankachen, a bar owner. Keshavunni falls in love with Malika, a girl in his village, and convinces her to watch a film with him. They get discovered by the people in the village and this causes a huge ruckus. On the day of the marriage, Kallan Krishnan and Kallan Kochappi come back to the village after becoming rich. Krishnan doesn't agree to let his daughter Mallika marry Keshavanunni. Both Kallans move to a big house with their families. Mallika is very unhappy because of her canceled marriage. Thankachan's toddy shop gets shut down by anti-alcohol activists. Eventually, both Kallans fight over her marriage and split up, ending their friendship and moving to two different homes. Both of them stand for elections and spend money to win. The villagers start fighting with each other about the elections. Mallika finds that both Kallans planned all this deliberately to make the villagers fight and kill each other in communal riots. She informs Keshu and his friends. On the day of the election results, both Velichappadu and Father announce that the Devi statue from the temple and the golden cross from the church are stolen. Both the Kallans are chased out of the village for stealing. Keshu and Mallika get married and life returns to normal for the villagers.

== Cast ==
- Jayaram as Keshavanunni / Keshu
- Parvathy as Mallika, Keshu's Lover
- Jagathy Sreekumar as Thankachan / Thanku, Keshu's Friend
- Innocent as Rtd. Head Constable Kunjambu Nair, Keshu's Father
- Janardhanan as Kallan Krishnan, Mallika's Father
- Siddique as Damodaran / Damu, Mallika's Brother
- Vijayaraghavan as Achankunju
- Oduvil Unnikrishnan as Fr. Antony Paramel
- Sankaradi as Mangalam Ji
- Mamukkoya as Jabbar
- Kuthiravattam Pappu as Velichappadu
- C. I. Paul as Kallan Kochappi
- Mala Aravindan as Vishwambaran
- K. P. A. C. Lalitha as Karthiyayaniamma, Mallika's Mother
- Philomina as Naniamma
- Valsala Menon as Aleykutty
- Praseetha Menon as Molly, Kochappi's Daughter

== Soundtrack ==
The music was composed by Johnson.

No.	Song	Singers	Lyrics	Length (m:ss)
1	"Pandu Pandu"	M. G. Sreekumar, Dinesh	Shibu Chakravarthy	
2	"Thulasitharayil"	M. G. Sreekumar, Sunanda	Shibu Chakravarthy	
3	Title Song	Johnson	Lal Jose	
4	"Vellathaamara" (Resung from Thirichadi)	K. J. Yesudas, P. Susheela	Vayalar	
