= Kadal Kadannu Oru Maathukutty =

- Directed by: Ranjith
- Written by: Ranjith
- Produced by: Shaji Nadesan; Santhosh Sivan; Prithviraj Sukumaran
- Starring: Mammootty
- Cinematography: Madhu Neelakandan
- Edited by: Sandeep Nandakumar
- Music by: Shahabaz Aman
- Production company: August Cinema
- Distributed by: August Cinema, Tricolor Entertainment
- Release date: 8 August 2013
- Running time: 132 minutes
- Country: India
- Language: Malayalam

Kadal Kadannu Oru Maathukutty is a 2013 Indian Malayalam drama film written and directed by Ranjith. It stars Mammootty as an NRI Christian from Pathanamthitta living in Germany. The film features an ensemble supporting cast including Nedumudi Venu, Balachandra Menon, Siddique, Harisree Asokan, Suresh Krishna, P. Balachandran, Balachandran Chullikad, Prem Prakash, Meera Nandan, Muthumani, Krishna Prabha, and Kaviyoor Ponnamma. It also features Mohanlal, Jayaram and Dileep in cameo roles. It was produced by Prithviraj Sukumaran, Santhosh Sivan, and Shaji Nadesan under the banner of August Cinema. The film was released on 8 August 2013 on the occasion of Eid-ul Fitr.

== Cast ==
- Mammootty in a dual role as
  - Kurudanjil George Mathew (Mathukutty)
  - himself (cameo appearance)
- Alisha Mohammed as Rosy
- Muthumani as Jansamma Mathukutty's Wife
- Meera Nandan as Kunjumol
- Sekhar Menon as Solaman
- Nedumudi Venu as Thomas
- Balachandra Menon as Fr. Kurian Vattathara
- Harisree Asokan as Rahman
- P. Balachandran as Kochunni
- Tini Tom as Vidhyadharan
- Balachandran Chullikad as Shamsudheen
- Narayanankutty as Ashokan
- Thesni Khan as Mohini
- Adinadu Sasi as Sugunan
- Nandu in a dual role as
  - Aanandhan
  - himself
- Siddique in a dual role as
  - Abraham
  - himself
- Suresh Krishna in a dual role as
  - Soman
  - himself
- Prem Prakash as Zachariya
- Kottayam Nazir as Kunjumon
- Kaviyoor Ponnamma as Mariyamma
- Krishna Praba as Deepa
- Chemban Vinod Jose as Mattanchery Man, Rahman's Gang
- Soubin Shahir as Mattanchery Martin, Rahman's Gang
- Daya Ashwathy

Cameo Appearances

- Mohanlal as himself
- Jayaram as himself
- Dileep as himself
- Jagadish as himself
- Idavela Babu as himself
- Manoj K. Jayan as himself
- Lakshmi Gopalaswamy as herself
- Manju Pillai as herself
- Bindu Panicker as herself
- Mythili as herself
- Johny Antony as Himself, Dileep's movie Director

== Production ==
The film was shot at Ayroor, Ranni, Kozhikode and Kochi in India and Mettmann and Düsseldorf in Germany. Asianet Television is reported to have paid ₹5.75 crore, a record sum at the time, for the rights to air the film.

Indiaglitz says "Kadal Kadannu Oru Maathukutty is average" and rated it 5.75/10. It received mixed reviews.
