= Onnam Loka Mahayudham =

- Film poster
- Directed by: Sree Varun
- Screenplay by: Hariprasad and Rishi Surya
- Produced by: Sajils Majeed
- Starring: Aparna Gopinath; Tovino Thomas; Chemban Vinod Jose; Joju George
- Cinematography: Pappinu
- Edited by: V. T. Sreejith
- Music by: Govind Vasantha
- Production company: Mehfil Productions
- Release date: 6 March 2015
- Country: India
- Language: Malayalam

Onnam Loka Mahayudham (transl. First World War) is a 2015 Indian Malayalam-language thriller film directed by Sree Varun (in his directorial debut). The film stars Aparna Gopinath and Tovino Thomas with Chemban Vinod Jose and Joju George in pivotal roles. In the film, Gopinath plays a police officer while Thomas plays a doctor.

== Cast ==
- Aparna Gopinath as Thara Mathew
- Tovino Thomas as Jacob
- Chemban Vinod Jose as Altaf
- Joju George as Anirudhan
- Santhosh Keezhattoor
- Anjali Nair as Lissy
- Lishoy
- Vijayakumar
- Balachandran Chullikkadu
- Balu Varghese as Bijesh

== Soundtrack ==
The soundtrack consists of a single song composed by Govind Menon. The song is "Thirayumee Mizhikalo" and is sung by Aneesh Krishna.

== Release ==
The Times of India gave the film two-and-a-half out of five stars and wrote that "The road movie about an unethical doctor keeps you yearning for a bit of sensible and thrilling story to kick in. Though there are a handful of twists and turns, sadly, none are entertaining enough". The Hindu wrote that "Right from the first frame, a sense of foreboding, of something about to happen, is maintained, only to be deceived time and again when things fizzle out".
