= Innathe Chintha Vishayam =

Innathe Chinthavishayam
- Directed by: Sathyan Anthikkad
- Written by: Sathyan Anthikkad
- Produced by: Antony Perumbavoor
- Starring: Mohanlal; Meera Jasmine; Sukanya; Mohini; Muthumani; Mukesh; Innocent
- Cinematography: Alagappan N.
- Edited by: K. Rajagopal
- Music by: Ilaiyaraaja
- Production company: Aashirvad Cinemas
- Distributed by: Central Pictures
- Release date: 12 April 2008
- Language: Malayalam

Innathe Chinthavishayam (transl. Thought for the day) is a 2008 Indian Malayalam-language family drama film written and directed by Satyan Anthikad. The film, produced by Antony Perumbavoor through Aashirvad Cinemas, stars Mohanlal, Meera Jasmine, Sukanya, Mohini, Innocent and Muthumani. The film's score and songs were composed by Ilaiyaraaja. The film addresses the increasing divorce rate within modern-day middle-class society in Kerala. The film was released on 12 April 2008.

== Plot ==
Dr. Muralikrishnan, a successful city dentist, leads a double life as a womanizer and conceals his affairs from his wife, Treesa, by labeling female contacts under male names in his phone. When Treesa discovers the deception and confronts Murali, he leaves both her and their daughter, Lakshmi. Treesa then becomes a driving instructor to support herself. Meanwhile, Treesa punishes Ranjan Philip, a womanizer who continually harasses her, by forcing him to strip naked in the street, taking away his clothes, and locking them in his car. Peethambaran and his wife, Premila, lead a comfortable life with their children, Malavika and Madhavan. However, due to Premila's extreme possessiveness, Peethambaran quits his lucrative job in the Gulf and returns home to constantly escort her. He develops an inferiority complex, leading to frequent arguments and their eventual separation. Rehna, a lawyer, is forbidden from practicing her profession by her orthodox husband, Noushad, and his family. She leaves him and begins working independently.

Gopakumar, alias GK, a garment exporter, enters the lives of the three separated women. He has bought the house where Treesa lives. Unable to evict Treesa and her daughter to establish his office, GK attempts to reunite Treesa and Muralikrishnan. During this process, he meets Premila and Rehna, who happen to be Treesa's friends, and decides to help them as well. The film follows how GK, aided by his fashion designer Kamala and land broker Immanuel, successfully reconciles the estranged couples

== Cast ==
- Mohanlal as Gopakumar (G.K.)
- Meera Jasmine as Kamala
- Sukanya as Treesa, Muralikrishnan's wife
- Mohini as Premila, Peethambaran's wife
- Muthumani as Adv. Rahna, Naushad's wife
- Innocent as Immanuel
- Mukesh as Dr. Muralikrishnan
- Vijayaraghavan as Peethambaran
- Ashokan as Noushad
- Mamukkoya as Shajahan
- Master Dhananjay as Madhavan
- Baby Niveditha as Lakshmi, Muralikrishnan and Treesa's daughter
- Baby Malavika as Malavika
- Ganapathi as Appu, Kamala's younger brother
- Rajesh Hebbar as Ranjan Philip, a harasser
- Santhakumari as Amina, Noushad's housemaid
- Vanitha Krishnachandran as Lathika, Kamala's mother
- Thesni Khan as Nancy, Immanuel's wife
- Siddique as Santhosh, Kamala's father
- Jayan Cherthala as Jayarajan, Kamala's brother
- Sreelatha Namboothiri as Noushad's Mother
- Kalamandalam Radhika as Raziya, Noushad's Aunt
- Reshmi Boban as Soumini, Pramila's Sister
- Babu Namboothiri as Krishnankutty, Premila's father
- Anoop Chandran
- Manjusha Sajish as Jamila, Noushad's Sister
- James Pottackal as Neighbour (Cameo)
- Kripa as Bhanumathi, Treesa's maid
- Ansiba Hassan as college student
- Althara as Seetha, Kamala's sister
- Shivaji Guruvayoor as Moosa, Noushad's relative

== Soundtrack ==
Innathe Chinthavishayam

Soundtrack album by Dr. Ilaiyaraaja
- Released: 2008
- Genre: Film
- Label: Manorama Music
- Producer: Antony Perumbavoor

The film's soundtrack was composed by Ilaiyaraaja, with lyrics by Gireesh Puthenchery.

Track	Song title	Singer(s)	Other notes
1	"Kando Kando"	M. G. Sreekumar	
2	"Kasthooripottum"	Vijay Yesudas, Chorus	
3	"Manassiloru"	Madhu Balakrishnan, Swetha	Raga: Keeravani
4	"Manassiloru" (Karaoke)		

== Box office ==
The film was released in 42 theatres in Kerala and collected a distributor's share of ₹3.72 crore (US$390,000) in 19 days. It was a commercial success at the box office.

== Awards ==
- Filmfare Award for Best Supporting Actress – Malayalam - Sukanya
- Kerala State Film Award for Best Film with Popular Appeal and Aesthetic Value
- Kerala State Film Award and Jaihind TV Award for Best Comedy Artist – Mamukkoya
- Asianet and Vanitha Film Awards for Best Male Playback Singer – M. G. Sreekumar
