= Munnariyippu =

- Theatrical release poster
- Directed by: Venu
- Screenplay by: Unni R.
- Story by: Venu
- Produced by: Ranjith
- Starring: Mammootty; Aparna Gopinath
- Cinematography: Venu
- Edited by: Beena Paul
- Music by: Bijibal
- Production company: Gold Coin Motion Picture Company
- Distributed by: Gold Coin Motion Pictures
- Release date: 22 August 2014
- Running time: 115 minutes
- Country: India
- Language: Malayalam

Munnariyippu (transl. Warning) is a 2014 Indian Malayalam-language psychological experimental thriller film directed by Venu and produced by Ranjith, screenplay by Unni R. The film stars Mammootty and Aparna Gopinath, with Nedumudi Venu, Joy Mathew, Prathap Pothan, Sreeraman, Renji Panicker, Saiju Kurup, Joshy Mathew, and Sudheesh in supporting roles. Prithviraj Sukumaran appears in a cameo role.

The film follows Anjali Arakkal (Aparna Gopinath), a junior journalist, who has set out to write an autobiography on convict C. K. Raghavan (Mammootty), who professes that he never committed the crimes he is in prison for. It was released on 22 August 2014 to critical and commercial acclaim.

Aparna and Mammootty's performance in the film were critically acclaimed. Mammooty's performance in the film was ranked by Film Companion amongst the 100 Greatest Performances of the Decade.

== Plot ==
Anjali Arakkal, a freelance journalist, while interacting with a retiring jail superintendent named Rama Moorthy for ghostwriting his autobiography, meets C. K. Raghavan, a prisoner convicted for double homicide serving 20 years even after his official term in jail. Raghavan was arrested for killing his wife and the daughter of his employer, yet he occasionally proclaims his innocence.

With Moorthy's information, the young journalist discovers that Raghavan writes. She gets access to his writings in which Raghavan interprets the world around him in his own way. Raghavan writes sentences like "Does the reflected image in a mirror look back at him or does it accept him and come along with him?"; "A prison should be a place for people to understand their mistakes and correct them rather than a place for punishment"; and "Life is a struggle before death". All this attracts Anjali to the mystery that Raghavan has built. Further, Raghavan's outlook on freedom and responsibility with his own brand of philosophy impresses Anjali, and she decides to write a feature about him.

The featured article gains much attention, and proposals come for publishing Raghavan's biography with his philosophies. Anjali decides to use this opportunity to make a name for herself with Raghavan's cooperation. Raghavan is very happy about the newly gained attention he is receiving. Anjali decides to visit Raghavan in jail and process his release from jail. After release, she finds accommodation for him and compels him to write up events and their interpretation to make it a book, though Raghavan hesitates. Later, while Raghavan is lollygagging, he meets up with his aspirants, and they invite him for a drink. Under influence there, he reveals his ideology about freedom as "Removing elements that obstruct the person is known as freedom. If it happens at home, it is called domestic abuse. If it happens in society, it is a revolution. Irrespective of where it happens, where there is revolution, blood will spill". Anjali reaches the limit with Raghavan's lollygagging and reacts badly in the presence of her colleague Mohan. Mohan advises Anjali not to pressure a person who was reluctant to come out of jail. Anjali faces a problem when the deadline to submit the book material is approaching, and Raghavan has not even started writing. Above that, other journalists are trying to get the full picture of Raghavan's story. She decides that it is best to move Raghavan to an undisclosed place.

The publishers pressure Anjali. The new accommodation and lack of facilities irk Raghavan. Anjali's marriage seems almost fixed with Chackochan, and she decides to leave the book publishing project and settle the deal in court. Anjali meets with Raghavan, gives him his diary and money received from jail for his rehabilitation, and lashes out at him for his stubbornness and complaints that the various accommodations and surroundings did not suit him. Raghavan smirks at her and gives her the full script of the story. Skimming through it, she comes to grips with the reality of Raghavan's true nature. Fear creeps under her skin. Raghavan tells her that he wants a new accommodation, wanting to go back to jail. With that, he murders her with one blow to the head.

Finally, Raghavan is shown peacefully sleeping in jail. Photos of Anjali, along with those of his other victims, are seen pasted near the jail wall as trophies of his victory over his own psychotic idealization of freedom.

== Cast ==
- Mammootty as C. K. Raghavan
- Aparna Gopinath as Anjali Arakkal
- Nedumudi Venu as Superintendent Rama Moorthy
- Prithviraj Sukumaran as Chacko in an extended cameo
- Prathap Pothan as KK
- Renji Panicker as Mohan Das
- Joy Mathew as Chandraji
- Kochu Preman as Advocate Eeppan
- Kottayam Naseer as Police S.I. (Sub-Inspector).
- V. K. Sreeraman as Sasikumar
- Saiju Kurup as Rajeev Thomas
- Kris Iyer as Publisher
- Joshy Mathew as Bar-mate
- Sudheesh as Bar-mate
- Santhosh Keezhattoor as Bar-mate
- Minon as K. P. Anil Kumar
- Sasi Kalinga as Appu Ettan
- Muthumani as Priya Joseph
- Parvathi T as Mother of Anjali
- Kiran Aravindakshan as Anwar
- Saradha Kozhokode as Mother of Ramani
- Anjali Aneesh Upasana
- Pauly as Servant

== Production ==
Venu was directing a film after 16 years, after his directorial debut Daya (1998) written by M. T. Vasudevan Nair. Venu created an idea including the opening and the conclusion for the plot since 2010. During the intervals between his busy schedule as a cinematographer, his wife and editor Bina Paul advised Venu to develop the thread into a story. Initially, Venu wanted to direct the film in Hindi and developed the story with Mumbai as the background. It was Bina Paul who noted that Malayalam would be better.

Venu's plan to write the screenplay by himself did not work out. After some days, he employed author and scenarist Unni R. Since then, Unni completed the whole screenplay with dialogues in a short span of time.

Initial choice for protagonist role was either Mammootty or Sreenivasan. Sreenivasan listened the story, but he did not sign in the film due to his highly tight schedule. After a few months, director Ranjith came in to finance the film. Ranjith narrated the story to Mammootty via phone. Mammootty committed the film within a 10-minute-long phone talk.

In early February 2014, Venu announced that in his upcoming directorial Rima Kallingal would play a role of a journalist who writes the biography of a person released from prison, played by Mammootty. However, by the end of February, Kallingal backed out from the project, citing date issues. The makers then decided to replace the actress by Aparna Gopinath. In late March, actress Muthumani announced that she had signed up in the film. She acted with Mammootty second time and her role was reported to be of a Delhi-based journalist. Young actor Minon John played a prominent role in the film, about which he said that he was guided and eased by Mammootty in their collaboration scenes.

The filming, participated by Mammootty, Aparna Gopinath and Renji Panicker, took place in an old building at the Gujarathi Street in Kozhikkode as well as in and around Kozhikkode town. The film was made on low budget and was completed filming in just 28 days.

== Release ==
The film was released on 22 August 2014.

=== Critical reception ===
Nidheesh M K of The New Indian Express described Munnariyippu as "a film that demands from us more than few bucks at the pay counter." He also wrote, "For the classic that it is, Munnariyippu is bound to remain in the hearts of those who care for the art of visual storytelling for long time to come." Akhila Menon of Filmibeat.com gave the film 4 stars out of 5 and concluded her review, "A must watch movie recommended for the movie lovers." She also wrote, "Mammootty delivers his best performance in recent times and excels as C K Raghavan. Aparna Gopinath proves her mettle as an actress with the meaty role."

Raj Vikram of Metromatinee.com wrote, "Munnariyippu is a many layered movie; seeps deep into the inner layers of sensibility. Mammootty takes the film to a different level with his expressive acting and subdued mannerisms." Padmakumar K of Malayala Manorama gave the film 3.5/5 and wrote, "Offering an experience which Malayali audience has so far been alien to, Munnariyippu gives an artistic mix of what is captivating as well as outlandish in terms of narrative, thanks to the brilliant work by script writer Unni R." He also said that the film "can be viewed as a movie with a different approach. Or the story of a person with a strange aptitude. Mammootty's character that stands out, stunningly. He is every inch the Raghavan of the film, in looks and in conduct." Aswin J Kumar of The Times of India gave a rating of 3.5/5 and wrote, "It feels good to watch Mammootty in Munnariyippu. It's as though the waxy glow on his face has melted away revealing a face that looks so human and so earthy." He concluded that the film "might not go well with a section of viewers, but this is a smart way of making a film and reinventing an actor." S.R. Praveen of The Hindu wrote in his review, "Munnariyippu, with its skeletal approach, delivers a thumping jolt to the viewer and reclaims the actor who was lost in the jungle of superstardom. One ends up wishing for a little more detail in places but at the same time it looks like holding everything back worked in the end."

Indiaglitz.com gave the film 7/10 and concluded, "A movie with no masala events, but one that is sure to be applauded in desi and international level, Munnariyippu is a must see for connoisseurs of all good cinema." Veeyen of Nowrunning.com wrote, "There is a deconstruction of sorts that occurs in Venu's Munnariyippu, as conventionalities are discarded without a second thought." He gave the film 3 stars out of 5 and wrote about the film as, "a revelatory drama that throws together an emphatic, no-nonsense narrative with a couple of out-of-the-world performances." He also lauded the performance of Mammootty as he wrote that the film "marks the reinvention of an actor [Mammootty] whom we simply adore, and lays forth a hundred reasons as to why we have been in awe of him for so long." Sify.com gave the film a verdict of "Above Average" and wrote, "Munnariyippu is aimed at those sections of viewers, who would like to be part of the narration, creating a visual of their own while watching the movie on screen. But even then, the film leaves you wanting for more."

=== Box office ===
The film was both commercial and critical success.

== Awards ==
- 2014 Kerala State Film Awards - Best Dubbing Artist : Vimmy Mariam George
- Moscow International Film Festival - Official Category and Asian Category
- Indian Panorama of International Film Festival of India of 2014 - Selected
- Chicago International Film Festival - Selected
- Asianet Film Awards for Best Actor - Mammootty
