= Pathirakalam =

2018 Malayalam film directed by Priyanandanan

- Directed by: Priyanandanan
- Written by: N. Sasidharan
- Starring: Mythili; Indrans; KaleshKannattu
- Cinematography: Aswaghoshan T.P
- Release date: 23 February 2018
- Country: India
- Language: Malayalam

Pathirakalam (English: Nocturnal Times) is a 2018 Indian Malayalam-language film directed by Priyanandanan starring Mythili.

== Plot ==
The film is about the dark and violent activities that happen in society today. The plot begins with finding Hussain who is a renowned researcher at Berlin University of the Arts and the father of Jahanara, the main protagonist. Hussain has missing for the past three months and there has been no follow-up on the missing case by the local police or judiciaries. Jahanara decides to take things into her own hands and, with her friend Mahesh, Jahanara sets out to find her father. The story follows Jahanara's journey and the difficulties and problems she encounters.

== Cast ==
- Mythili
- Indrans
- Sreejith Ravi
- Kalesh Kannattu
- Romanch as Aneesh
