= Nallavan (2010 film) =

- Poster
- Directed by: Aji John
- Written by: Aji John; Ajith Nambiar
- Produced by: Anil Mathew; S. Murukan
- Starring: Jayasurya; Mythili
- Cinematography: Manoj Pillai; Pradip Nair
- Music by: Mohan Sithara; Saanand George Grace (SGG)(Background score)
- Distributed by: Anil Mathew; S Murugan for Bethestha Productions
- Release date: 9 July 2010
- Country: India
- Language: Malayalam

Nallavan (transl. The good man) is a 2010 Malayalam-language crime thriller film written and directed by Aji John (in his directorial debut). It stars Jayasurya and Mythili. The story of this film inspired by the bestseller Papillon, a novel written by Henri Charrière details Papillon's purported incarceration and subsequent escape from the French penal colony of French Guiana and covers a 14-year period between 1931 and 1945. Nallavan is produced by Anil Mathew S Murugan for Bethestha Productions

== Plot ==
The movie starts from the Kerala high court, when the police bring Kocherukkan (Jayasurya), a man who had committed two murders and escaped jail four times, but is again caught by the police. He escapes yet again with the help of his friend Murukan (Sudheesh), and recollects his colourful memory.

Kocherukkan was a happy youth who lived an ordinary life in a quiet village somewhere in the border of Tamil Nadu and Kerala. He is in love with Malli (Mythili), an agile, adventurous, cheerful girl of 17. Both of them are orphans, and Malli has a landlord. The tumultuous life of Kocherukkan and Malli takes a sudden change when Malli's landlord Chandrashekhara Vazhunnor (Sai Kumar) and his driver Devarajan (Vijayakumar) decide to get her married to his relative Chitharanjan (Suraj Venjarammood). Malli and Kocherukkan elope with the help of Shaji (Bijukuttan) and Shangu (Anoop Chandran), Kocherukkan's friends. They meet a guy named Kumareshan (Siddique) on the way, who tries to kidnap Malli, but Kocherukkan hits him with a stone and they flee. They reach Pollachi and start living with Murukan. Kocherukkan and Malli go to the registrar's office to get married but since Malli was only 17 and Kocherukkan was 20, the registrar (Kochu Preman) asks them to return after a year when they are legally entitled to get married.

A year later, Kocherukkan was spotted by Kumareshan, who was the sub-inspector of the area and he arrests Kocherukkan for his personal enmity and for blinding him in the right eye. He puts all the false charges on Kocherukkan including immoral trafficking and robbery. But he runs off from the court to meet Malli and they get married. But he reports back to police the same day since police arrests Murukan instead of Kocherukkan and tortures him.

Kocherukkan is sent to the jail again. This time Malli gets to know from newspaper that Kocherukkan is a wanted criminal now, through Devarajan and her stepfather Narayanan (Manianpilla Raju). She returns to the landlord and dismisses her relation. Kocherukkan escapes from jail again and finds Malli murdered in a desert. He is arrested again with one more crime of murder. Kumareshan also traps him in another murder, this time that of Vazhunnor with the help of Devarajan and Raghavan (Jayan Cherthala) who is an ex-prisoner in Kocherukkan's jail.

Back to the present, Kocherukkan escapes again for the fifth time, questions Narayanan and understands that Kumareshan is behind his Malli's murder. He goes to Kumareshan's house and kills both Raghavan and Devarajan. He calls Kumareshan and challenges him to meet him in the same place where he killed Malli. Kumareshan arrives at the place and tells him that he already killed Murukan and proceeds to show Murukan's corpse to Kocherukkan. Kocherukkan gets beaten up by Kumareshan at first, but when he recollects how Kumareshan killed Malli and Murukan, Kocherukkan eventually fights back and kills Kumareshan. But before he could die, Kocherukkan tells Kumareshan that he could have proved his innocence to Malli before he could kill her. The police then arrives to arrest him but he runs away, and few gunshots are heard, while the frame shows Kocherukkan joining hands and running away with Malli.

== Cast ==
- Jayasurya as Kocherukkan
- Mythili as Malli, Kocherukkan's love interest
  - Esther Anil as Young Malli
- Siddique as SI Kumaresan
- Sudheesh as Murukan
- Suraj Venjaramood as Chitharanjan
- Bijukuttan as Shaji
- Sai Kumar as Chandrashekhara Vazhunnor, Malli's landlord
- Maniyanpilla Raju as Narayanan
- Anoop Chandran as Shangu
- Jayan Cherthala as Raghavan
- Vijayakumar as Devarajan
- Kochu Preman as Santhosh, the registrar of the marriage office
- Bindu Panicker as Murukan's mother
- Sona Nair as Prosecutor Rajalakshmi Warrier
- Ambika Mohan as Vazhunnor's wife

== Soundtrack ==
Nallavan

Soundtrack album by Mohan Sithara
- Released: 8 July 2010
- Genre: World Music

The soundtrack of the film was composed by Mohan Sithara. "Pudichachu" is an "Adipoli dance" type Tamil/Malayalam song, "Thoomallike" is a romantic Malayalam song, and "Maayakkanavu" is an emotional Malayalam song.

No.	Title	Performer(s)	Length
1.	"Pudichachu"	Anwar Sadath, Jisha, Sangeetha	5:08
4.	"Maayakkanavu"	Arun Gopan	4:40
5.	"Thoomallike Allithen Mallike"	Latha Krishna, Santhosh Raj	4:15
6.	"Nallavan"	Prameela, Sanandh George (vocals)	2:46
7.	"Theme Music"		0:47
