= Njaan =

- Film poster
- Directed by: Ranjith
- Screenplay by: Ranjith
- Story by: T. P. Rajeevan
- Based on: KTN Kottoor: Ezhuthum Jeevithavum by T. P. Rajeevan
- Produced by: Gold Coin Motion Picture Company
- Starring: Dulquer Salmaan; Suresh Krishna; Saiju Kurup; Renji Panicker; Anumol; Muthumani; Harish Perady
- Cinematography: Manoj Pillai
- Edited by: Sandeep Nandakumar
- Music by: Bijibal
- Production company: Gold Coin Motion Pictures
- Distributed by: Singapore Coliseum
- Release date: 19 September 2014
- Country: India
- Language: Malayalam

Njaan (English: "I") is a 2014 Indian Malayalam-language period drama film directed by Ranjith with Dulquer Salmaan in a dual role as K.T.N Kotoor and Ravi Chandrashekhar, along with Jyothi Krishna, Anumol and Shruti Ramachandran as the female leads. The movie is based on the novel K T N Kottur Ezhuthum Jeevithavum by T. P. Rajeevan, which is set against the backdrop of India's freedom struggle and depicts the history of a Kerala village. The film was released on 19 September 2014.

== Plot ==
Ravi Chandrasekharan is a young blogger who has a keen interest in the life of KTN Kottoor - a writer, poet and revolutionary freedom fighter. Ravi, being involved actively in theatre and arts, expresses his wish to recreate the story of KTN Kottur on stage rather than make it a book. To explore the different shades and the mysteries surrounding the man, he arrives in Kottur to learn the intricacies of the person.

After reaching Kottoor, Ravi finds it strange to adapt to the surroundings, as he attends the village cultural fairs and learns about the local customs. Ravi, in one such incident, wakes up abruptly in the middle of the night covering his mouth because of nausea due to bad odour & he checks around but finds nothing. The next morning, he finds ashes of a dead creature & realises that this was the stench which made him uncomfortable & from then he encounters the twists in the life of KTN Kottoor and the mystery surrounding his disappearance on the day India won her Independence.

== Cast ==
- Dulquer Salmaan in a dual role as
  - K. T. N Kottoor.
  - Ravi Chandrasekhar.
- Saiju Kurup as V. P. Kunjikannan
- Suresh Krishna as Achan
- Hareesh Peradi as Nakulan
- Anumol as Janu
- Sajitha Madathil as Kurathi Kunjooli
- Renji Panicker as Kuttysankaran
- Muthumani as valliamma
- Jyothi Krishna as Lakshmikkutty
- Shruthi Ramachandran as Susheela
- Irshad
- Joy Mathew as himself
- Pearle Maaney as Valli
- Mythili as Devayaniyamma (Devu)
- Maala Parvathi as Veluthedath Meenakshi
- Chinnu Kuruvila
- Jayan Cherthala
- Bineesh Kodiyeri
- Koottickal Jayachandran
- Mohammed musthafa as raghavan

== Production ==
It was the first time Ranjith and Dulquar joined hands for a film. The first teaser of the film released on 12 June 2014 followed by the second on 17 June.

== Awards and nominations ==
2014 Kerala State Film Awards

- It received two Kerala State Awards.

Award	Category	Recipients and nominees	Outcome
2014 Kerala State Film Awards	Best Screenplay (Adapted)	Ranjith	Won
2014 Kerala State Film Awards	Best Background Music	Bijibal	Won

Asiavision Awards - 2014

- It received Asiavision Awards 2014 - award for best direction and screen play.

Award	Category	Recipients and nominees	Outcome
AsiaVision Award 2014	Best direction & Best Screenplay	Ranjith	Won
