= Muthumani =

Indian actress

Muthumani Somasundaran
- Born: Ernakulam, Kerala, India
- Education: National University of Advanced Legal Studies, Kochi; Cochin University of Science and Technology
- Occupations: Film Actress; Lawyer; Lecturer; Theatre Actress; Television host
- Years active: 2006–present
- Spouse: Arun P. R (m. 2006)
- Children: 1
- Parents: Somasundaran; Shirly Somasundaran

Muthumani Somasundaran is an Indian actress who mainly works in Malayalam films. She made her cinematic debut through the Malayalam film Rasathanthram directed by Sathyan Anthikkad's in 2006.

== Early life and education ==
Muthumani was born in Ernakulam, Kerala to Somasundaran and Shirly Somasundaran. They were active in the theatre field, which influenced her to work in theatre plays. She went to St. Mary's Convent Girls High School, Ernakulam. She has worked as a child artist for All India Radio. She learned dance but later moved onto mono-act. She topped the mono-act competitions in the Kerala School Kalolsavam. She obtained her graduate degree in law from the National University of Advanced Legal Studies, Kochi. She holds a Master's and a Doctoral degree in Law from Cochin University of Science and Technology.

== Career ==
=== Theatre ===
Muthumani joined and actively participated in the Amateur Theatre Wing. She played the central character, Vasundhara in Oru Dalit Yuvathiyude Kadana Katha, based on M. Mukundan's novelette. She was closely associated with the theatre groups in Kochi from her school days. It was while doing her Plus Two education that she travelled to Greece for the Ancient Greek Theatre Festival to represent India under the banner ‘Lokadharmi’ which were the only team from the Asia- Pacific region. The play was based on the Greek character Medea in which she played a 35-year-old mother of two. She won the best actress for the play Mukkanji at the Theatre Olympiad held in Orissa. She donned the role of Chethu, a masculine woman in the play. That honour eventually got her the role in Sathyan Anthikkad's Malayalam film, Rasathanthram. She also did a play called Lanka Lakshmi in which she played the Mandodari.

She acted in a Malayalam adaptation of The God of Small Things, where she acted as Rahel and as Arundhati Roy. She also played the role of Kannagi in Madurai Kandam, the last segment of Silappatikaram.

=== Film ===
Muthumani made her film debut in Sathyan Anthikkad's, Rasathanthram opposite Mohanlal, in which she played the character who has a crush on the character played by Mohanlal. After that she has acted several notable Malayalam films. Some of her notable roles were in Kadal Kadannu Oru Maathukutty, How Old Are You?, Oru Indian Pranayakadha, Njaan and Lukka Chuppi.

== Personal life ==
Muthumani completed her Bachelor's in Law from National University of Advanced Legal Studies. After completing law, she enrolled as an advocate in Kerala High Court, Ernakulam. She is now focusing on, Prerana, a life-skill training centre, which "gives need-based training for students, teachers and corporates." She earned a Master's and a Doctoral degree in Law from Cochin University of Science and Technology She is married to screenwriter/director Arun P. R., who directed the 2019 Malayalam Movie Finals.

== Filmography ==
Year	Title	Role	Notes
2006	Rasathanthram	Kumari	
2007	Vinodayathra	School teacher	Cameo appearance in a song
2008	Innathe Chintha Vishayam	Rehna	
2011	Manikyakkallu	Sundari teacher	
2013	5 Sundarikal	Sicily	In Kullante Bharya (Anthology film)
2013	Kadal Kadannu Oru Maathukutty	Jansamma	
2013	Annayum Rasoolum	Shalu	
2013	Oru Indian Pranayakadha	Vimala Ramanathan	
2013	Therapist	Dr. Nikhil's wife	Short film
2014	How Old Are You?	Sashikala	
2014	Munnariyippu	Priya Joseph	
2014	Njaan	Janu / Valiamma	
2015	Lukka Chuppi	Suhara Rafiq	
2015	Thinkal Muthal Velli Vare	Vanaja	
2015	Swargathekkal Sundaram	Dr. Renu	
2015	Jamna Pyari	Vinitha	
2015	Nirnnayakam	Dr.Hema	
2015	Loham	Advocate Rekha	
2015	Double Barrel	Quarreling wife at Hotel	Cameo appearance
2015	Saigal Padukayanu	Doctor	
2015	Rajamma @ Yahoo	Mary George	
2015	Su.. Su... Sudhi Vathmeekam	Sreedevi	
2016	Hello Namasthe	Shahida	
2016	Leela	Kunjamma / Angel	
2016	Valleem Thetti Pulleem Thetti	Vanaja Neer	
2016	Kammatti Paadam	Savithri	
2016	Pa Va	Kunjumol	
2016	Kochavva Paulo Ayyappa Coelho	Girija	
2017	Jomonte Suvisheshangal	Laly	
2017	Ramante Eden Thottam	Nazmi	
2017	Villain	Doctor	
2017	Chippy	Unknown	
2018	Parole	Haseena	
2018	Uncle	Lakshmi	
2018	Vallikkudilile Velakkaran	Mary	
2018	Pretham 2	A.C.P Meera Anwer	
2019	Naan Petta Makan	Jyothy teacher	
2019	Pathinettam Padi	Teacher, Ayyappan's mother	
2019	Finals	Varadha	
2019	Under World	Adv. M. Padmavathi	
2020	Wonder Woman Vanaja	Adv.Vanaja	Short film
2020	Kilometers and Kilometers	Flight Passenger	Cameo appearance
2021	Anugraheethan Antony	Shalet	
2021	The Sound of Age	Magistrate Lathika	
2021	Kaaval	Smitha Antony	
2022
2022	Bro Daddy	Dr. Archana Menon	
2022	Night Drive	Saranya Varma	
2022	Zam Zam	Smitha	
2022	Across the Ocean	Gayathri Ram	
2022	Veekam	Advocate	
2023	Christy	Malini	
2023	Kaathal – The Core	Adv. Ameera	
2024	Adios Amigo	Shymol	
2025	Am Ah	Sindhu V Menon	
2025	Officer on Duty	Adv.Rekha Chandrasekhar	
2025	E valayam	Anitha	
2025	Get-Set Baby	Nalini Narayanan	
2025	Pharma	Jasmine	JioHotstar series
2026	Chatha Pacha	Lotus	
2026	Lurk †	TBA	

=== Television career ===
- Njnannu Sthree (Amrita TV) as Anchor
- Kuttikalavara (Flowers TV) as anchor
- Chandralekha (Reporter TV) as anchor
- Ithalukal (Asianet News) as Anchor
- Chakkarapanthal (Mathrubhumi News) as Anchor

== Dubbing credit ==
- For Padmapriya - Iyobinte Pusthakam (2014)
