= Palery =

- village
- Location in Kerala, India Palery (India)
- Coordinates: 11°35′5″N 75°45′10″E
- Country: India
- State: Kerala
- District: Kozhikode

Government
  - Type: Panchayati raj (India)
  - Body: Gram panchayat

Population (2011)
  - Total: 14,680

Languages
  - Official: Malayalam, English
- Time zone: UTC+5:30 (IST)
- PIN: 673508
- Vehicle registration: KL-

Palery is a village in Kozhikode district in the state of Kerala, India.

== Demographics ==
As of 2011 India census, Palery had a population of 14680 with 6933 males and 7747 females.

== Transportation ==
Paleri village connects to other parts of India through Koyilandy town. The nearest airports are at Kannur and Kozhikode. The nearest railway station is at Koyiandy. The national highway no.66 passes through Koyilandy and the northern stretch connects to Goa and Mumbai. The southern stretch connects to Cochin and Trivandrum. The eastern National Highway No.54 going through Kuttiady connects to Mananthavady, Mysore and Bangalore.

== In popular culture ==
Paleri Manikyam: Oru Pathirakolapathakathinte Katha (Undying Echoes of Silence in English), the 2008 best-selling novel by T. P. Rajeevan, fictionalises the first recorded murder case that was registered after the formation of the first democratically elected communist government in Kerala. The story revolves around the murder of a young Thiyya girl who comes from a neighbouring village to Palery as the wife of the assistant sorcerer of the village. The novel was adapted into a film with the same title in 2009.
