= Leela (2016 film) =

- Official poster
- Directed by: Ranjith
- Written by: Unni R.
- Based on: Leela by Unni R.
- Produced by: Ranjith
- Starring: Biju Menon; Vijayaraghavan; Suresh Krishna; Indrans; Sudheer Karamana; Parvathy Nambiar; Jagadish Kumar; Priyanka Nair
- Cinematography: Prashanth Ravindran; DI by Liju Prabhakar
- Edited by: Manoj Kannoth
- Music by: Bijibal
- Production company: Capitol Theater
- Release date: 22 April 2016
- Country: India
- Language: Malayalam

Leela is a 2016 Indian Malayalam-language satirical film directed and produced by Ranjith. The film is an adaptation of a short story of the same name by Malayalam screenwriter Unni R. which was published in Mathrubhumi Weekly. Biju Menon plays the lead role, while Vijayaraghavan, Suresh Krishna, Indrans, Sudheer Karamana, Parvathy Nambiar, Jagadish Kumar, and Priyanka Nair play supporting roles.

The movie was released on 22 April 2016. It is the first Malayalam film in history to make its international premiere online on the same day of its theatrical release.

== Plot ==
Leela is a black comedy drama set in South Kerala. It follows the protagonist, Kuttiyappan, who is on a delirious mission and is assisted by his trusted aide. Kuttiyappan travels in search of a woman who can fulfill his desires. He is in search of a prime tusker to be a part of his sexual fantasy. The journey explores characters Kuttiyappan meets and the various events in these intersections. He finally finds his requirements. He feels pity for the woman he chooses and decides to marry her. However, unfortunately, the elephant he bought for the task kills that woman. The story cuts through open spaces of abuse and egos as a knife through butter in a divergent manner.

== Cast ==
- Biju Menon as Kuttiyappan
- Vijayaraghavan as Gopinathan Pillai Nair/Pillechan
- Indrans as Dasappappi
- Parvathy Nambiar as Leela
- Jagadish Kumar as Thankappan Nair
- Suresh Krishna as Devassi
- Sudheer Karamana as Thommichan
- Muthumani as Angel
- Parvathi T. as Padmini
- Kavitha Nair as Usha
- Priyanka Nair as C. K. Bindu
- Kochu Preman as Dr. Sukumaran
- Valsala Menon as Kumarakom Nalini
- Santhakumari as Chengalam Omana
- V. K. Sreeraman as Soman Muthalali
- Pauly Valsan as Eliyamma
- Kottayam Purushan as Rama Panikker
- Adinad Sasi as Jabbar
- Chithira Rose Mathew as Pillechan's daughter
- Sini Abraham as Vilasini (Rama Panikker's wife)

== Release ==
The film was released throughout India on 22 April 2016. It was also available to watch online through Reelax, an online streaming website, thus becoming the first film in the history of Malayalam cinema to be released online on the day of its theatrical release.

=== Online piracy issue ===
On 26 April 2016, four days after the film was released in theatres and online, it was shared publicly on peer-to-peer (torrent) file-sharing websites. According to Malayala Manorama, the film was also shared across various social media profiles and was consequently downloaded 'thousands of times since its upload.' Commenting on the issue, the scriptwriter of the film, Unni R., said, "We don't know who all are behind uploading the pirated version of the movie on internet. But they will be arrested soon."

Subsequently, the film's director, Ranjith, took to his social media account to request a call for action against the culprits. "We have come to the notice that the print of the movie Leela is being shared in couple of Facebook pages and sites. We strongly condemn this act. We have already reported this to the Police authorities and would like to inform that strong action will be taken against the culprits [sic]," he said in his Facebook post.

== Reception ==
Goutham VS critic of Indian Express Limited stated that "This Ranjith film provokes disturbing questions" and gave 3.5 out of 5. Deepa Soman, critic of Times of india gave 3.5 out of 5 and stated that "The wistful fate of Leela can trigger some tears as the final credits roll, but that wouldn't take away the fulfilment of watching an eloquent film.".Onmanorama critic gave 3 out of 5 and wrote that "Leaving these questions to the readers recommending it as a one-time watch"
