= T. P. Rajeevan =

Indian novelist and poet (1959–2022)

T. P. Rajeevan (Thachom Poyil Rajeevan)
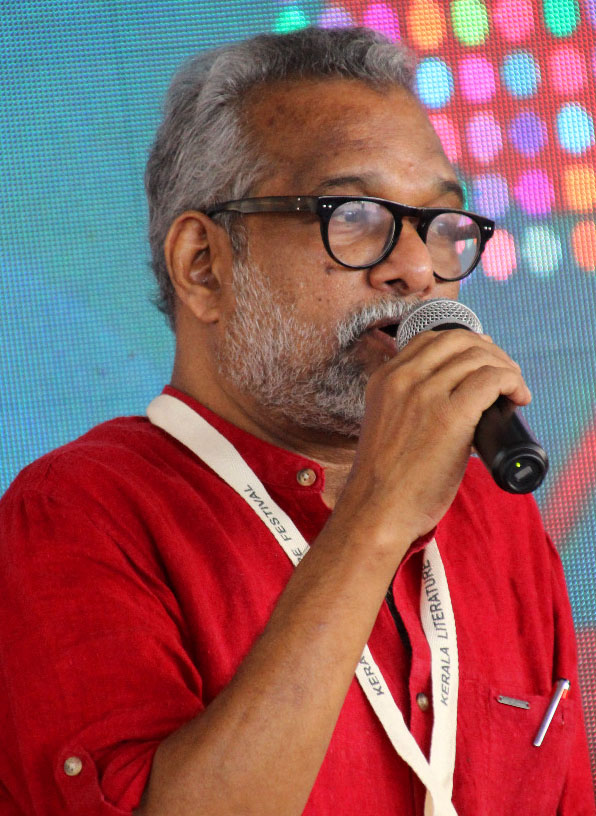
- Born: Thachom Poyil Rajeevan; 28 June 1959; Palery, Kozhikode, Kerala, India
- Died: 2 November 2022 (aged 63); Kozhikode, Kerala, India
- Occupations: Novelist, poet
- Writing career
- Language: Malayalam, English
- Notable works: Paleri Manikyam: Oru Pathirakolapathakathinte Katha; KTN Kottoor: Ezhuthum Jeevithavum
- Notable awards: 2014: Kerala Sahitya Akademi Award for Novel – KTN Kottoor: Ezhuthum Jeevithavum

Thachom Poyil Rajeevan (28 June 1959 – 2 November 2022) was an Indian novelist and poet originally from Palery who wrote in Malayalam and English languages.

== Works ==
In Malayalam, Rajeevan published two novels (Paleri Manikyam: Oru Pathirakolapathakathinte Katha, and KTN Kottoor: Ezhuthum Jeevithavum); six poetry collections (Vathil, Rashtratamtram, Korithachanal, Vayalkkarayil Ippolillatha, Pranayasatakam, and Dheergakalam); a travelogue (Purappettu Poya Vakku); and an essay collection (Athe Akasam Athe Bhoomi.

Both of his novels in Malayalam were made into films.

Rajeevan wrote Paleri Manikyam first in English when residing in Iowa, United States, in 2009. He translated it into Malayalam after coming back to Kerala. However, the English version, titled Undying Echoes of Silence, only appeared in August 2013.

In English, he published Undying Echoes of Silence and two poetry collections (Kannaki and He Who Was Gone Thus).

Rajeevan also edited an anthology of poems (Third Word: Post Socialist Poetry) with Croatian poet, Lana Derkac.

== Reviews ==
Rajeevan received praise from Sashi Tharoor who wrote in The Hindu: "That the University of Calicut harbours such talent in its midst is itself a priceless public relations asset of which I hope the University's administrators are proud."

Regarding He Who Was Gone Thus, Anita Nair stated in the Hindu that it would dazzle even a reader who skims through it.

== Awards and fellowships ==
Rajeevan received the V. T. Kumaran Award in 1988. In 2008, he received a Ledig House International Writers Residency. He was the second recipient from Kerala, and the eighth from India. Rajeevan was awarded the Kerala Sahitya Akademi Award for his novel KTN Kottor: Ezhuthum Jeevithavum, in 2014.
