= Ranjith (director) =

Indian film director, screenwriter, producer, actor

Ranjith Balakrishnan
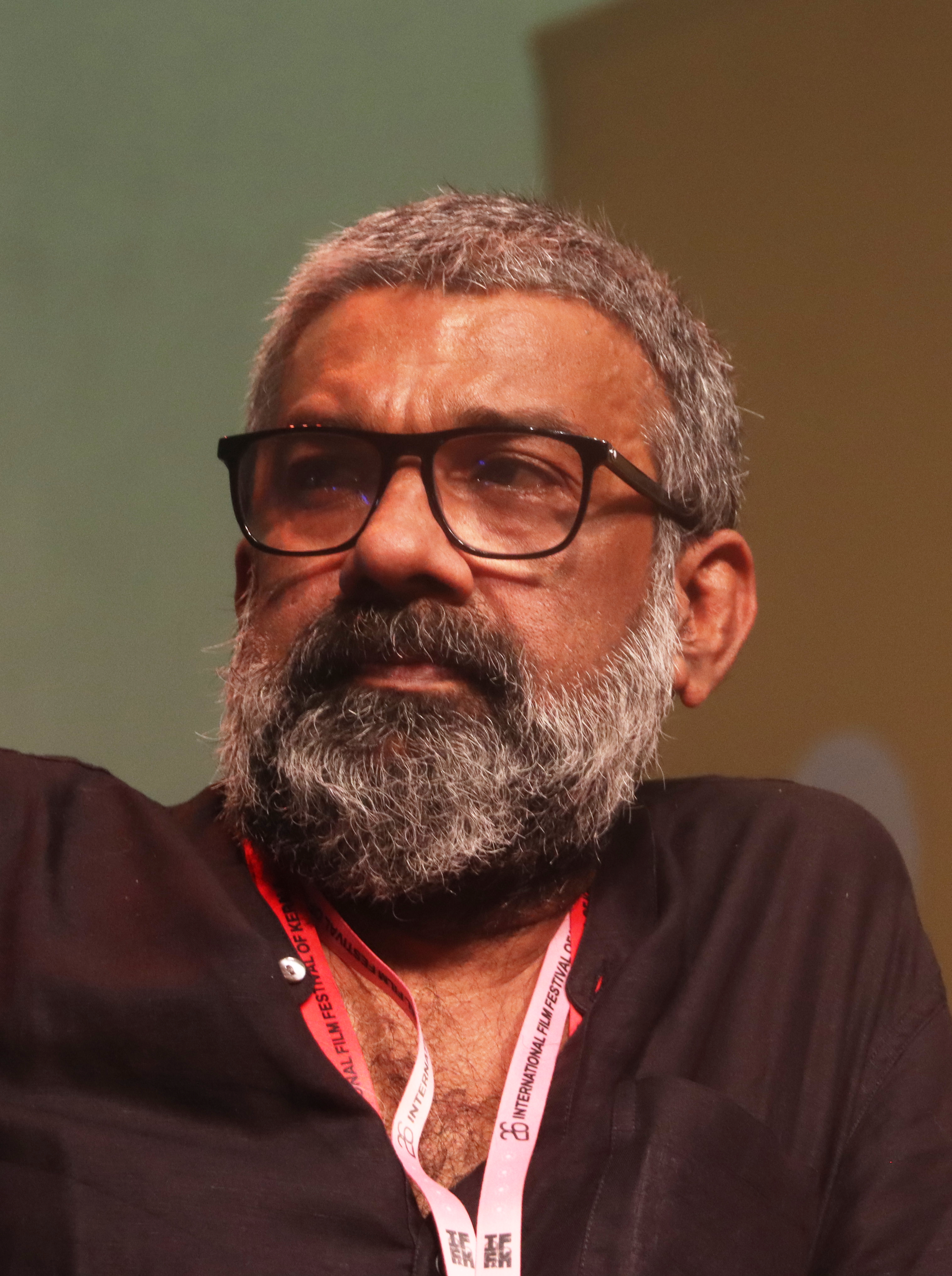
- Ranjith (director)
- Born: Balussery, Kozhikode, Kerala
- Education: School of Drama and Fine Arts, Thrissur
- Occupations: Film director; screenwriter; producer; actor
- Years active: 1987–present
- Parent: Karumala Balakrishnan
- Relatives: Agnivesh Ranjith (son), Aswaghosh Ranjith (son)

Ranjith Balakrishnan is an Indian film director, screenwriter, producer, and actor who works in Malayalam cinema. Ranjith made his directorial debut in 2001 with Ravanaprabhu, the sequel to Devaasuram. He has won three National Film Awards, including one for his film Spirit, which received the National Award for Best Film on Social Issues. His films Thirakkatha and Indian Rupee won the National Film Award for Best Feature Film in Malayalam in 2008 and 2011, respectively. Recipient of six Kerala State Film Awards, he was the former chairman of Kerala State Chalachitra Academy.

== Early life ==
Ranjith was born at Balussery in the Kozhikode district of Kerala. He then graduated from the School of Drama and Fine Arts, Thrissur.

== Career ==
=== 1987 to 1992: Early career ===
Ranjith's entry into Mollywood was accidental, he was inspired by his friend, the late film producer and director Alex I. Kadavil, in whose residence he had stayed for his debut in the film industry. In 1987, he made his debut as a writer in Oru Maymasa Pulariyil, produced by Alex I. Kadavil and directed by V. R. Gopinath. In 1988, Ranjith made his formal entry into the film world by writing the story for Orkkapurathu, an adventure film directed by Kamal, with Mohanlal in the lead role. The immediate success of Orkkapurathu brought Ranjith several opportunities to work in films. In the late 1980s and early 1990s, Ranjith wrote scripts for several small budget films, mainly for Kamal, including Peruvannapurathe Visheshangal (1989), Pradeshika Varthakal (1989) and Pookkalam Varavayi (1991).

Another director with whom Ranjith worked during this period was Viji Thampi. This team released Witness (1988), Nanma Niranjavan Sreenivasan (1990), Nagarangalil Chennu Raparkam (1989) and Kaalalpada (1990), all with Jayaram in the lead role. In 1992, he wrote Neelagiri for I. V. Sasi, which underperformed at the box office. This was followed by Johnnie Walker, directed by Jayaraj, which was noted for its different filmmaking style and was a commercial success at the box office.

=== 1993 to 2000: Breakthrough ===
1993 was significant in Ranjith's career: Devasuram, his film based on the life of his father-figure, Mullassery Rajagopal, turned out to be a huge box office hit. With Mohanlal in the lead and directed by I.V. Sasi, Devasuram was both critically and commercially acclaimed; Mohanlal's performance was lauded and it opened a new genre of feudal stories in Malayalam cinema. Within two months of the release of Devasuram, Ranjith's next movie, Maya Mayuram (directed by Sibi Malayil and again starring Mohanlal) was released, but was not as successful. According to Ranjith, Maya Mayuram is one of his best films and its failure affected him greatly. Ranjith mentioned in an interview that several directors passed on the opportunity to make Maya Mayuram, and it was Mohanlal who convinced Sibi Malayil to get involved.

After writing Yadavam (directed by Jomon and starring Suresh Gopi), Ranjith worked with Shaji Kailas for Rudraksham, again starring Suresh Gopi, who was at the peak of his career. This film generated significant hype in the market as Shaji Kailas-Suresh Gopi was a hot selling team at the time, but the loose script and clichéd humorless dialogues led to Rudraksham becoming a flop. His next piece of work, Rajaputhran, directed by Shajoon Kariyal, again with Suresh Gopi in the lead, became a superhit.

In 1997, Ranjith teamed up again with Shaji Kailas for Asuravamsham, starring Manoj K Jayan and Biju Menon; the film yielded an average commercial response. Towards the end of 1997, Ranjith penned Aaraam Thampuran, which went to become one of the biggest hits of his career. This film was also a turning point in the career of Mohanlal, and with it Ranjith gained a reputation as a commercially viable scriptwriter. Then came Kaikudanna Nilavu, in 1998, directed by Kamal, starring Jayaram, yet another average grosser. In 1998 Ranjith scripted Summer in Bethlehem, directed by Sibi Malayil, starring Suresh Gopi and Jayaram, a super hit. In 1999, Ranjith and Shaji Kailas produced the film Ustaad, directed by Sibi Malayil, starring Mohanlal.

The year 2000 began with the release of Narasimham, directed by Shaji Kailas. With Mohanlal playing the lead role, this film became one of the biggest hits ever in the history of Malayalam cinema at the time. Yet again in 2000, together with Director Shaji, Ranjith repeated history: his Onam release Valliettan starring Mammooty was a commercial success. This was his last script for Shaji Kailas and with this film Ranjith became the most successful scriptwriter of the time.

=== 2001 to 2009: Directorial debut and further success ===
In 2001, Ranjith made his directorial debut with Ravanaprabhu, the sequel to Devasuram. With Mohanlal appearing in dual roles as father and son, this film turned out to be another blockbuster. The success of his directorial debut led Rashtra Deepika to name Ranjith the Man of the year. In 2002 Ranjith came back with another successful film, Nandanam, starring Navya Nair and a new face, Prithviraj Sukumaran. Ranjith produced this film along with his friend, actor Siddique. Nandanam, revolving around an innocent girl, her love for Lord Sri Krishna and her beau, was an entirely different and unexpected theme from Ranjith at the time. Despite the film not having a big star cast, fights, or punchy dialogues – and being shelved after some pre-production activities – it became a hit.

In 2003 Ranjith directed Mizhi Randilum, starring Dileep and Kavya Madhavan, another family drama, which failed to impress the masses, but was critically acclaimed. In the same year Ranjith scripted Ammakilikood, directed by Padmakumar with Prithviraj in the lead role, which also got the cold shoulder from the public. In 2004 Ranjith teamed up with Mammooty for Black, which was a complete commercial entertainer targeting the fans of Mammootty. Chandrolsavam, starring Mohanlal, followed in 2005. Ranjith believes that it was not a bad film. He said, "Mohanlal fans expected too much. I don't think it was a bad film. Many who watched it on DVD called to say they were surprised it did not do well. Fans come in with pre-conceived notions on how the actor will be in the movie and the kind of story it will be, hence they could not grasp the poetic element in the film."

In 2006, he scripted and directed Prajapathi, starring Mammootty, was also blasted by critics, and was another disastrous movie. His next venture was an offbeat film Kaiyoppu. Though a flop at the box office, Kaiyoppu brought critical appreciation from far corners and that compelled Ranjith to work with plots and themes without any commercial ingredients. Notably, its lead actor Mammootty received no payment to act in the film as the script impressed him so much.

In 2007, Ranjith teamed up with Joshiy for the big budget film Nasrani starring Mammootty. His next directorial feature was the musical-comedy Rock & Roll, starring Mohanlal. In 2008 Ranjith directed Thirakkatha, based on actress Srividya's life, which won the National Award for the Best Malayalam Feature Film. Starring Anoop Menon and Priyamani, the movie featured Prithviraj and Samvrutha Sunil in important supporting roles. The movie was able to bring out the best in the actors. In 2009 Ranjith directed and wrote the script for Paleri Manikyam: Oru Pathira Kolapathakathinte Katha, which was critically acclaimed. Ranjith also introduced about thirty Malayalam stage artists through this film. In the same year he came up with another unique creation, Kerala Cafe — a fusion of ten different short films by ten directors. The different segments in the movie were conceived and connected based on the concept of Yatra, or journey.

=== 2010 onwards ===
In 2010 Ranjith wrote the story for the film Penpattanam, directed by V. M. Vinu. He then scripted and directed, Pranchiyettan and the Saint, starring Mammootty, which was also widely accepted by movie fans and the people of Kerala. It became the most popular film of the year and was also a commercial success. Pranchiyettan and the Saint is now considered one of the best comedy films in Malayalam cinema and has over the years attained a cult status. During this time, Ranjith also received a highly coveted appointment as the School Director for Cochin Media School. He also appeared as judge in "Mammootty the Best Actor Award – II", an acting talent-hunt reality show aired on the television channel Asianet. In 2011, Ranjith scripted and directed a critically acclaimed satirical film Indian Rupee starring Prithviraj, which was well received by the critics and also a commercial success. His next film, Spirit, primarily focused on the increasing habits of alcoholism in Kerala. Starring Mohanlal in the lead role, the film was critically acclaimed and a box office success. He then produced and scripted for G. S. Vijayan's Mammootty-starring Bavuttiyude Namathil in 2012. His next film with Mammootty, Kadal Kadannoru Mathukkutty, underperformed at the box office.

Njaan, based on the novel K T N Kottoor: Ezhuthum Jeevithavum by T P Rajeevan and featuring Dulquer Salmaan in the lead role, was released on 19 September 2014. He also produced Munnariyippu starring Mammootty in the lead role. The film became one of the highest grossers of the year. In 2015 he directed Loham, starring Mohanlal, which received mixed reactions from critics.

== Controversy ==
On 23 August 2024, in the wake of Hema Committee report, Indian actress Sreelekha Mitra levelled accusations against Ranjith. She alleged he touched her body with sexual intent at a flat in Ernakulam during the audition of his 2009 film Paleri Manikyam: Oru Pathirakolapathakathinte Katha. She further added that she did not have confidence to pursue the matter any further to prosecute Ranjith for the offence attracting sections 354, and 354 B of the IPC at the time of the commission of crime as she hailed from West Bengal. Even though Ranjith denied the charges, he resigned from the posts of chairman of Kerala State Chalachitra Academy. In January 2024, Kerala High Court sought explanation from government as that the case is still active and subject to further judicial review. This was based on a petition filed by Ranjith seeking dismissal of charges. In October 2025, the case was quashed by the Kerala High Court, citing "The Court found that the magistrate cannot take cognizance of the complaint 15 years after the alleged offences in this case".

October 2024, an FIR was filed against Ranjith in Bangalore, alleging sexual assault by a 31-year-old man. The complaint claimed that the two met during a film shoot at a hotel in December 2012, where the complainant was offered alcohol and later sexually assaulted. The case was registered under Section 377 of the Indian Penal Code and Section 66E of the Information Technology Act. The case was transferred from Kerala Police, and Ranjith was granted anticipatory bail for 30 days. The Karnataka High Court later stayed the investigation into the criminal case against Ranjith in December, after noting that the five-star hotel where the alleged crime was said to have occurred did not even exist at that time. In July 2025, the Karnataka High Court quashed the sexual assault case against Ranjith Balakrishnan, giving him a clean identity and bringing the legal proceedings to a close.

On March 31, 2026, he was arrested and was taken into custody by Thodupuzha Police, in connection with an attempted sexual assault case.

== Filmography ==
Key
†	Denotes films that have not yet been released

List of film credits
Year	Film	Credited as					
Year	Film	Director	Producer	Screenwriter	Story	Actor	Role/Notes
1987	Ezhuthappurangal	No	No	No	No	Yes	Ramanandan
1987	Oru Maymasa Pulariyil	No	No	No	Yes	No	—N/a
1988	Orkkappurathu	No	No	No	Yes	No	—N/a
1989	Kaalal Pada	No	No	No	No	Yes	Violinist
1989	Pradeshika Varthakal	No	No	Yes	No	No	—N/a
1989	Peruvannapurathe Visheshangal	No	No	Yes	No	No	—N/a
1990	Shubhayathra	No	No	Yes	No	No	—N/a
1990	Pavakkoothu	No	No	Yes	No	No	—N/a
1990	Nanma Niranjavan Srinivasan	No	No	Yes	No	No	—N/a
1990	Marupuram	No	No	Yes	No	No	—N/a
1990	Nagarangalil Chennu Raparkam	No	No	Yes	No	No	—N/a
1991	Georgootty C/O Georgootty	No	No	Yes	Yes	No	—N/a
1991	Pookkalam Varavayi	No	No	Yes	No	No	—N/a
1991	Neelagiri	No	No	Yes	No	No	—N/a
1992	Johnnie Walker	No	No	Yes	No	No	—N/a
1993	Devasuram	No	No	Yes	No	No	—N/a
1993	Maya Mayooram	No	No	Yes	No	No	—N/a
1993	Yaadhavam	No	No	Yes	No	No	—N/a
1994	Rudraksham	No	No	Yes	No	No	—N/a
1996	Rajaputhran	No	No	Yes	No	No	—N/a
1997	Krishnagudiyil Oru Pranayakalathu	No	No	No	Yes	No	—N/a
1997	Asuravamsam	No	No	Yes	No	No	—N/a
1997	Aaraam Thampuran	No	No	Yes	No	No	—N/a
1998	Kaikudunna Nilavu	No	No	Yes	No	No	—N/a
1998	Summer in Bethlehem	No	No	Yes	No	No	—N/a
1999	Ustaad	No	Co-producer	Yes	No	No	—N/a
2000	Valyettan	No	No	Yes	No	No	—N/a
2000	Narasimham	No	No	Yes	No	No	—N/a
2001	Ravanaprabhu	Yes	No	Yes	Yes	No	—N/a
2002	Nandanam	Yes	Co-producer	Yes	Yes	No	—N/a
2003	Mizhi Randilum	Yes	No	Yes	No	No	—N/a
2003	Ammakilikkoodu	No	No	Yes	No	No	—N/a
2004	Black	Yes	No	Yes	No	No	—N/a
2005	Chandrolsavam	Yes	No	Yes	No	No	—N/a
2006	Prajapathi	Yes	No	Yes	No	No	—N/a
2007	Kaiyoppu	Yes	Yes	No	No	No	—N/a
2007	Nasrani	No	No	Yes	Yes	No	—N/a
2007	Rock & Roll	Yes	No	Yes	No	No	—N/a
2008	Thirakkatha	Yes	Co-producer	Yes	Yes	Yes	Director Aby Kuruvilla
2008	Gulmohar	No	No	No	No	Yes	Induchoodan
2009	Kerala Cafe	Yes	Yes	Yes	No	No	Segment:Prologue
2009	Paleri Manikyam: Oru Pathirakolapathakathinte Katha	Yes	No	Yes	No	No	—N/a
2010	Penpattanam	No	No	No	Yes	No	—N/a
2010	Best Actor	No	No	No	No	Yes	Himself
2010	Pranchiyettan and The Saint	Yes	Yes	Yes	No	No	—N/a
2011	Bhakthajanangalude Sradhakku	No	No	No	Yes	No	—N/a
2011	Indian Rupee	Yes	No	Yes	Yes	No	—N/a
2012	Spirit	Yes	No	Yes	Yes	No	—N/a
2012	Jawan of Vellimala	No	No	No	No	Yes	Dr. Shivaprasad
2012	Bavuttiyude Namathil	No	Yes	Yes	Yes	No	—N/a
2013	Annayum Rasoolum	No	No	No	No	Yes	Usman
2013	Kadal Kadannoru Mathukkutty	Yes	No	Yes	Yes	No	—N/a
2014	Munnariyippu	No	Yes	No	No	No	—N/a
2014	Njan	Yes	Yes	Yes	No	No	—N/a
2015	Ayal Njanalla	No	No	No	Yes	No	—N/a
2015	Loham	Yes	No	Yes	Yes	No	—N/a
2016	Leela	Yes	Yes	No	No	No	—N/a
2017	Puthan Panam	Yes	Co-producer	Yes	Yes	No	—N/a
2018	Koode	No	No	No	No	Yes	Aloshy
2018	Drama	Yes	No	Yes	Yes	No	—N/a
2019	Unda	No	No	No	No	Yes	C. I. Mathews Anthony
2020	Ayyappanum Koshiyum	No	Co-producer	No	No	Yes	Kurien John
2020	King Fish	No	No	No	No	Yes	Dhasharadha Varma
2021	Nayattu	No	Co-producer	No	No	No	—N/a
2021	One	No	No	No	No	Yes	Vijaya Mohan
2022	Mukundan Unni Associates	No	No	No	No	Yes	Adv.Gangadharan
2022	Twenty One Gms	No	No	No	No	Yes	Dr.John Samuel
2022	Kotthu	No	Co-producer	No	No	Yes	Sadanandan
2024	Nadikar	No	No	No	No	Yes	Koshy
2024	Thalavan	No	No	No	No	Yes	Home Minister T.K.Raghavan
2024	Secret	No	No	No	No	Yes	
2024	Manorathangal	Yes	No	No	No	No	Segment:Kadugannawa, Oru Yathra Kurippu
2025	Aaro — Someone	Yes	Yes	No	No	No	Short film
2026	Law and Order	Yes	No	No	No	No	

== Awards ==
National Film Awards:

- 2012: Best Film on Social Issues – Spirit
- 2011: Best Feature Film in Malayalam – Indian Rupee
- 2008: Best Feature Film in Malayalam – Thirakkatha

Kerala State Film Awards:

- 2021: Kerala State Film Award for Best Film with Popular Appeal and Aesthetic Value – Ayyappanum Koshiyum
- 2014: Kerala State Film Award for Best Screenplay(Adapted) – Njaan
- 2011: Kerala State Film Award for Best Film – Indian Rupee
- 2010: Kerala State Film Award for Best Film with Popular Appeal and Aesthetic Value – Pranchiyettan and The Saint
- 2009: Kerala State Film Award for Best Film – Paleri Manikyam: Oru Pathirakolapathakathinte Katha
- 2001: Kerala State Film Award for Best Film with Popular Appeal and Aesthetic Value – Ravanaprabhu

Kerala Film Critics Awards

- 2010: Kerala Film Critics Award for Best Film – Pranchiyettan and the Saint
- 2010: Kerala Film Critics Award for Best Director – Pranchiyettan and the Saint
- 2010: Kerala Film Critics Award for Best Script – Pranchiyettan and the Saint
- 2009: Kerala Film Critics Award for Second Best Film – Paleri Manikyam: Oru Pathirakolapathakathinte Katha
- 2008: Kerala Film Critics Award for Best Film – Thirakkatha
- 2008: Kerala Film Critics Award for Second Best Actor – Gulmohar
- 2007: Kerala Film Critics Award for Second Best Film – Kaiyoppu
- 2003: Kerala Film Critics Award for Second Best Film – Mizhi Randilum
- 2002: Kerala Film Critics Award for Best Director – Nandanam
- 2002: Kerala Film Critics Award for Best Film – Nandanam

Asianet Film Awards

- 2012: Asianet Film Award for Best Director – Spirit
- 2011: Asianet Film Award for Best Director – Indian Rupee
- 2010: Asianet Film Award for Best Film – Pranchiyettan and the Saint
- 2009: Asianet Film Award for Best Director – Paleri Manikyam: Oru Pathirakolapathakathinte Katha
- 2003: Asianet Film Award for Best Script Writer – Mizhi Randilum
- 2002: Asianet Film Award for Best Film – Nandanam

Filmfare Awards South

- 2014: Best Film – Munnariyippu
- 2010: Best Director – Pranchiyettan & the Saint
- 2010: Best Film – Pranchiyettan & the Saint
- 2008: Best Director – Thirakkatha
- 2008: Best Film – Thirakkatha

Other Awards:

- 2011: Vayalar Ramavarma Chalachitra Television Award and The Kochi Times Film Award for Best Film – Indian Rupee
- 2010: Nana Film Awards for the Best Film – Pranchiyettan & the Saint
- 2010: Nana Film Awards for the Best Director – Pranchiyettan & the Saint
- 2010: Vanitha Film Awards for the Best Film – Pranchiyettan & the Saint
- 2010: Vanitha Film Awards for the Best Director – Pranchiyettan & the Saint
- 2010: Vanitha Film Awards for the Best Script – Pranchiyettan & the Saint
- 2010: Kairali film Awards for the Best Film – Pranchiyettan & the Saint
- 2010: Kairali film Awards for the Best Director – Pranchiyettan & the Saint
- 2010: Vanitha Film Awards for Best Director – Paleri Manikyam: Oru Pathirakolapathakathinte Katha
- 2010: Mathrubhumi – Amrita TV Film Awards for Best Director – Paleri Manikyam: Oru Pathirakolapathakathinte Katha
- 2008: Mathrubhumi – Amrita TV Film Awards for Best Film – Thirakkatha
- 2008: Mathrubhumi – Amrita TV Film Awards for Best Director – Thirakkatha
- 2008: Padmarajan Award – Thirakkatha
- 2005: Bharathan Memorial Award
- 2002: Ramu Kariat Award – Nandanam
