= Muzik 247 =

Muzik247
- Type: Private
- Industry: Music, Entertainment
- Genre: Various
- Headquarters: Chennai, Tamil Nadu, India
- Website: Official website

Muzik 247 based out of Chennai, acquires music rights for South Indian Cinema films, mainly Tamil, Malayalam and Tulu. The company was founded in 2012 by Naveen Bhandari, and has achieved a large market share of the Malayalam film music.

== About ==
The company distributes the acquired content on various web and Mobile platforms, including iTunes, Apple Music, Spotify, JioSaavn, Gaana, Wynk Music, YouTube, Book My show Jukebox, and Amazon Music. Muzik247, in an attempt to promote young music talent, launched 'Muzik247 Music Maker 2015' - a talent hunt to bring out the next Malayalam music sensation In December 2015, Starting in September 2016, Muzik247 also began acquiring short films to keep their audience engaged with another form of entertainment.

Muzik247 won the title of the Best Malayalam Music label at Indywood Music Excellence Awards 2017 - Kerala Chapter

== Notable releases ==
In the year 2015, Muzik247 acquired the music of Director Alphonse Puthren's movie Premam.

A Muzik247 acquired album, Charlie created a record of having more than one lakh views on the album uploaded on YouTube within a day of its release. The album was released on Muzik247's official YouTube page.

In Nov 2016, Poomaram song video from Poomaram, on Muzik247 started trending within the first ten positions on YouTube India. The video reached a milestone by crossing 10 million views on YouTube and being the most Liked Malayalam video on YouTube.

"Manikya Malaraya Poovi", the song from Oru Adaar Love has become the fastest video from South India to cross 50 million views on YouTube.

In September 2018, "Freak Penne" from Oru Adaar Love composed by Shaan Rahman, crossed 1 million views on Muzik247's channel in less than 10 hours.

== Film music released by Muzik247 ==
Following are the list of notable music albums Released by Muzik 247.

Year	Film	Language
2022	Thallumaala	Malayalam
2021	Thala	Malayalam
2021	Minnal Murali	Malayalam
2021	Kasada Tabara	Tamil
2019	Love Action Drama	Malayalam
2019	Action	Tamil
2019	Kadaram Kondan	Tamil
2019	Sindhubaadh	Tamil
2019	Devi 2	Tamil
2019	Pennaal	Malayalam
2019	Ottakkoru Kaamukan	Malayalam
2019	Cochin Shadhi At Chennai 03	Malayalam
2019	Janaadhipan	Malayalam
2019	Colombian Academy	Malayalam
2019	Allu Ramendran	Malayalam
2019	Argentina Fans Kaattoorkadavu	Malayalam
2018	Lakshmi	Tamil
2018	Sundaran Subhash	Malayalam
2018	Ennaalum Sarath..?	Malayalam
2012	Pranayakadha	Malayalam
2013	Immanuel	Malayalam
2018	Koode	Malayalam
2013	8:20	Malayalam
2014	Salalah Mobiles	Malayalam
2013	August Club	Malayalam
2012	Da Thadiya	Malayalam
2013	Hotel California	Malayalam
2018	Velakkariyayirunnalum Neeyen Mohavalli	Malayalam
2018	Poomaram	Malayalam
2018	Jallianwala Bagh	Malayalam
2018	Kuttanpillayude Sivarathri	Malayalam
2018	Old Is Gold	Malayalam
2018	Aravindante Athidhikal	Malayalam
2018	Sakalakalasala	Malayalam
2018	Ramante Edanthottam	Malayalam
2018	Thondimuthalum Driksakshiyum	Malayalam
2018	Orayiram Kinakkalal	Malayalam
2018	Thrissivaperoor Kliptham	Malayalam
2018	Kidu	Malayalam
2018	Udalaazham	Malayalam
2018	Party	Tamil
2018	RK Nagar	Tamil
2018	Oru Adaar Love	Malayalam
2018	Pullikkaran Staraa	Malayalam
2018	Keni	Tamil
2018	Kinar	Malayalam
2018	Adam Joan	Malayalam
2018	Njandukalude Nattil Oridavela	Malayalam
2018	Hey Jude	Malayalam
2018	Kallai FM	Malayalam
2018	Kala Viplavam Pranayam	Malayalam
2018	Kalyanam	Malayalam
2018	Shikkari Shambhu	Malayalam
2017	Punyalan Private Limited	Malayalam
2017	Aana Alaralodalaral	Malayalam
2017	Pullikkaran Staraa	Malayalam
2017	Kaattu	Malayalam
2017	History of Joy	Malayalam
2017	Chippy	Malayalam
2017	Chakkaramaavin Kombathu	Malayalam
2017	Pillers	Malayalam
2017	E	Malayalam
2017	Udaharanam Sujatha	Malayalam
2017	Theru Naaigal	Tamil
2017	Adam Joan	Malayalam
2017	Cappuccino	Malayalam
2017	Basheerinte Premalekhanam	Malayalam
2017	Thondimuthalum Driksakshiyum	Malayalam
2017	Thrissivaperoor Kliptham	Malayalam
2017	Vilakkumaram	Malayalam
2017	Oru Cinemakkaran	Malayalam
2017	Melle	Malayalam
2017	Theeram	Malayalam
2017	Manhole	Malayalam
2017	Ayaal Sassi	Malayalam
2017	Himalayathile Kashmalan	Malayalam
2017	Engeyum Naan Iruppen	Tamil
2017	Adventures of Omanakuttan	Malayalam
2017	Ramante Edanthottam	Malayalam
2017	Basheerinte Premalekhanam	Malayalam
2017	Avarude Raavukal	Malayalam
2017	Angamaly Diaries	Malayalam
2017	Oru Mexican Aparatha	Malayalam
2016	Poomaram	Malayalam
2016	10 Kalpanakal	Malayalam
2016	Ennodu Vilayadu	Tamil
2016	Team 5	Malayalam
2016	Kochavva Paulo Ayyappa Coelho	Malayalam
2016	Oru Muthassi Gadha	Malayalam
2016	Bongu	Tamil
2016	Kolanji	Tamil
2016	Popcorn	Malayalam
2016	Kismath	Malayalam
2016	Villain	Tulu
2016	Koppayile Kodumkaattu	Malayalam
2016	Oru Malayalam Color Padam	Malayalam
2016	Karinkunnam 6s	Malayalam
2016	Anyarku Praveshanamilla	Malayalam
2016	Kammatipaadam	Malayalam
2016	James & Alice	Malayalam
2016	Rambarooti	Tulu
2016	Namma Kudla	Tulu
2016	Valliyum Thetti Pulliyum Thetti	Malayalam
2016	Jacobinte Swargarajyam	Malayalam
2016	Vettah	Malayalam
2016	Maheshinte Prathikaaram	Malayalam
2016	Pavada	Malayalam
2016	Guddedha Bhootha	Tulu
2016	Maalgudi Days	Malayalam
2016	Monsoon Mangoes	Malayalam
2015	Charlie	Malayalam
2015	Jo and the Boy	Malayalam
2015	Chupke Chupke	Tulu
2015	Style	Malayalam
2015	Aana Mayil Ottakam	Malayalam
2015	Rajamma @ Yahoo	Malayalam
2015	Su Su Sudhi Vathmeekam	Malayalam
2015	Ain	Malayalam
2015	Rani Padmini	Malayalam
2015	Kanal	Malayalam
2015	My God	Malayalam
2015	Jamna Pyari	Malayalam
2015	Kunjiramayanam	Malayalam
2015	KL 10 Patthu	Malayalam
2015	Premam	Malayalam
2015	Ivide	Malayalam
2015	Right Bokka Left	Tulu
2015	Dosthi	Tulu
2015	Kumbasaram	Malayalam
2015	Nee-Na	Malayalam
2015	Yeregla Panoduchi	Tulu
2015	Lailaa O Lailaa	Malayalam
2015	Oru Vadakkan Selfie	Malayalam
2015	Mariyam Mukku	Malayalam
2015	Super Marmaye	Tulu
2014	Mylanchi Monchulla Veedu	Malayalam
2014	Ormayundo Ee Mukham	Malayalam
2014	Iyobinte Pusthakam	Malayalam
2014	Sapthamashree Thaskaraha	Malayalam
2014	Vikramadithyan	Malayalam
2014	Angry Babies in Love	Malayalam
2014	Chaali Polilu	Tulu
2014	Bangalore Days	Malayalam
2014	Mr. Fraud	Malayalam
2014	Nirel	Tulu
2014	Gangster	Malayalam
2014	7th Day	Malayalam
2013	Rickshaw Driver	Tulu
2012	Bangarda Kural	Tulu

== Music albums produced by Muzik247 ==
Following are the list of notable music albums by Muzik247.

Year	Album	Language
2021	Nee illai endraal anbae	Tamil
2019	Nee Yamini	Malayalam
2019	Dhavani	Malayalam
2019	Swaymvaram	Malayalam
2019	Sharonin Theerangal	Malayalam
2017	Meenakshi	Malayalam
2018	Ende Keralam	Malayalam
2018	There is No Goodbye	Malayalam
2018	Idanazhiyil	Malayalam
2018	Adhiyogi	Malayalam
2018	Mayathennum	Malayalam
2018	Innelekal	Malayalam
2018	Miss You - Do Re Mi Fa	Tamil
2018	Engengu Nee Sendra Pothum	Tamil
2018	Sparsham -The Last Touch	Malayalam
2018	Njan Malayali	Malayalam
2018	Oru Kai Tharaam	Malayalam
2018	Ennennum Koode	Malayalam
2018	Churul	Malayalam
2018	Pazheyoru Paatu	Malayalam
2018	Laksha	Malayalam, Tamil, Telugu, Kannada, Hindi
2018	Poovithal Pole	Malayalam
2018	Njan Communist	Malayalam
2018	Neeharam	Malayalam
2018	Mounangalin Mozhiyagiren	Tamil
2018	There is No Goodbye	Malayalam
2018	Idanazhiyil	Malayalam
2018	Adhoori Thi Baat	Hindi
2018	Mayathennum	Malayalam
2018	Kana Kana Vaazhgiren	Malayalam
2018	Meera	Malayalam
2018	L'amour	Malayalam
2018	Mizhiyithal	Malayalam
2018	Nirangal	Malayalam
2018	Pattom	Malayalam
2018	Ibn-e-Khuda	Malayalam
2018	Laak	Malayalam
2017	Christmas Candle	Malayalam
2017	Mizhi	Malayalam
2017	Harvard Tamil Chair Song-Ulaga Tamizharkor	Tamil
2017	Aval Saraswathy	Malayalam
2017	Ente Bharatham	Malayalam
2017	Mazhaye	Malayalam
2017	Kande Kande	Malayalam
2017	December	Malayalam / Tamil
2017	Pulchaadi	Malayalam
2017	Oru Naal	Tamil
2017	Kolam	Malayalam
2017	Eighties 80s	Malayalam
2017	Meenakshi	Malayalam
2017	For You	Malayalam
2017	Laak	Malayalam
2017	Manadinil	Tamil
2017	Manjil	Malayalam
2017	Nirangal	Malayalam
2017	Pattom	Malayalam
2017	Chaithra Sandhyathan	Malayalam
2017	Mizhi	Malayalam
2017	Unn Kankalin	Tamil
2017	Yaagam	Tamil
2017	Kanave Kalayathe	Tamil
2017	Kannoonjal	Tamil
2017	Mounam Sollum Varthaigal	Tamil
2015	Ponnavani Pattukal	Malayalam
2015	Snehavarsham	Malayalam
2015	Ee Kallum Mullum	Malayalam
2015	Megharagam	Malayalam
2015	Shivadahara	Malayalam
2015	Nilathattam	Malayalam
2015	Yelove	Malayalam
2014	Bhakthi Sangamam Vol 1	Malayalam
2013	Bhakthi Sangamam Vol 2	Malayalam
2020	SOFIA	Malayalam

== Short films ==
Following are the list of notable short films by Muzik247.

Year	Short Film	Language
2018	The Unsung Heroes	Malayalam
2018	Thonimukk	Malayalam
2018	Kuthirapavan	Malayalam
2018	Rare Birds	Malayalam
2018	It's Waiting	Malayalam
2018	Anjaathante Sammanam	Malayalam
2018	Midway	Malayalam
2018	Rosham	Malayalam
2018	Pagadai Vilayattu	Tamil
2018	Adikkwo Samee	Malayalam
2018	Ayyappanum Deepthiyum	Malayalam
2018	Life Is Calling	Malayalam
2018	Meldina	Malayalam
2018	Touch	Malayalam
2018	Today	Malayalam
2018	Kanavugal Ayiram	Tamil
2018	Farrago	Malayalam
2018	Dhrunam	Malayalam
2018	Antagonist	Malayalam
2018	Ira	Malayalam
2018	Mayika	Malayalam
2018	High Range	Malayalam
2018	Adam's Eve	Malayalam
2018	Aira	Malayalam
2018	Chillu	Malayalam
2018	Dwayam	Malayalam
2018	376	Malayalam
2018	Yellow - The Flower Of Friendship	Malayalam
2018	Devayani	Malayalam
2018	ILA	Malayalam
2018	Sangathi Gutha Hawa	Malayalam
2018	Sunnath Kalyanam	Malayalam
2018	Night Rider	Malayalam
2018	The Villain	Malayalam
2018	Thiranottam	Malayalam
2018	Premsama	Malayalam
2018	The Prank	Malayalam
2018	Ennum	Malayalam
2018	Yours Lovingly	Malayalam
2018	Vaarikkuzhiyile Kolapaathakam	Malayalam
2018	4 U	Malayalam
2018	Dhaanyam	Malayalam
2018	Veettile Visheshangal	Malayalam
2018	Chakshu Sravana Galasthamam Dhardhuram	Malayalam
2018	David	Malayalam
2018	Pottasum Thokkum	Malayalam
2018	Oru Marunadan Pranayakadha	Malayalam
2017	Anna	Malayalam
2017	Split	Malayalam
2017	Chungakkarum Fariseyarum	Malayalam
2017	#Throwback	Malayalam
2017	Anali	Malayalam
2017	The Other Half	Malayalam
2017	One For The Road	Malayalam
2017	Paka	Malayalam
2017	A	Malayalam
2017	Nirnayam	Malayalam
2017	Anuraaga Gaanam Pole	Malayalam
2017	Mullavallikalkidayile Jaathi Thykal	Malayalam
2017	Kayyankali	Malayalam
2017	Mileva	Malayalam
2017	Canvas	Malayalam
2017	Andharam	Malayalam
2017	Chekuthane Snehicha Malagha	Malayalam
2017	The Last Sunset	Malayalam
2017	Fugue	Malayalam
2017	Exodus	Malayalam
2017	Padippura	Malayalam
2021	OUT OF NIGHT	Malayalam
