= List of Malayalam songs recorded by Shreya Ghoshal =

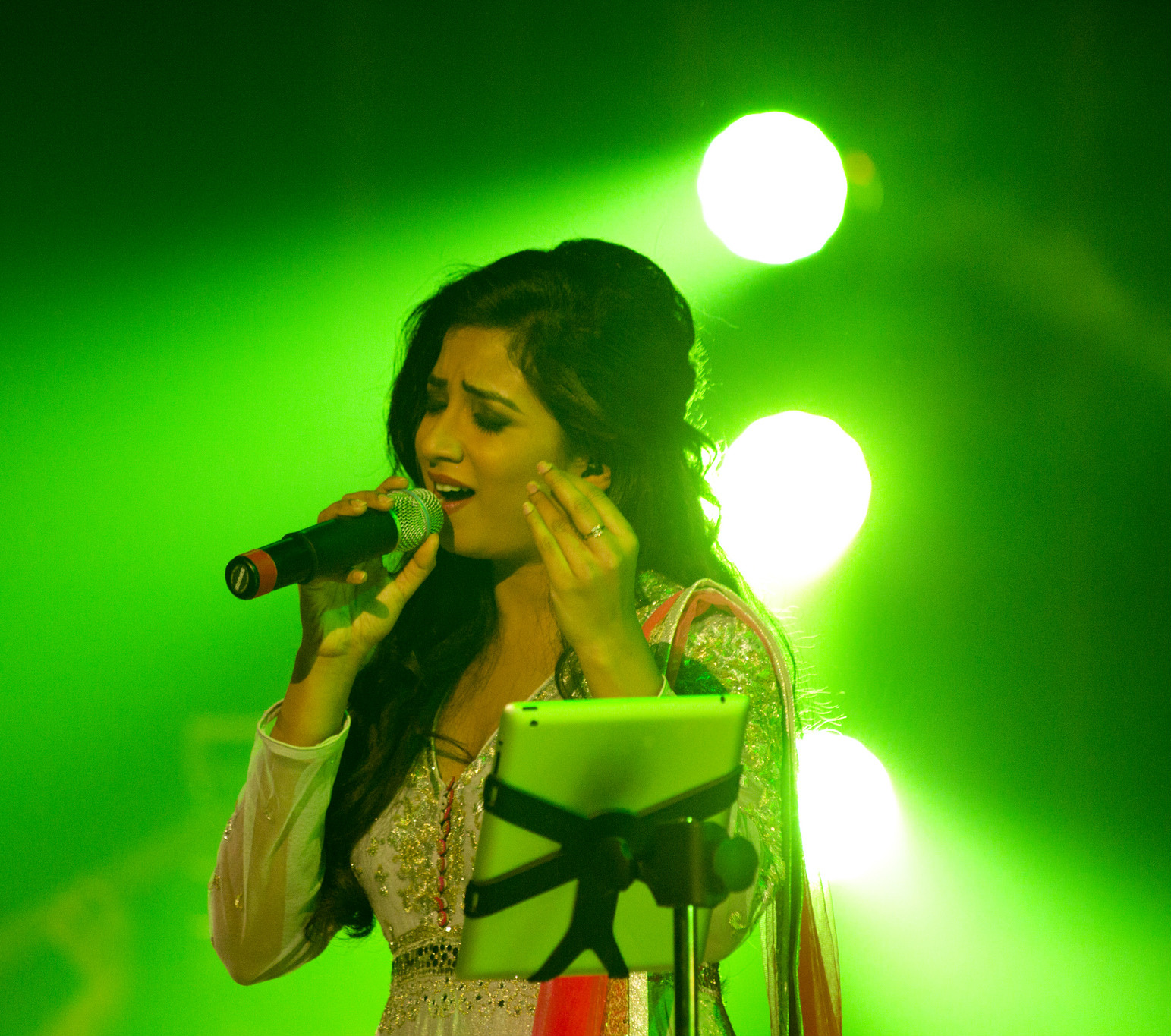
Shreya Ghoshal

Shreya Ghoshal (born 12 March 1984) is an Indian playback singer. She sings in Hindi, Malayalam, Tamil, Telugu, kannada, Marathi, Gujarati, Bengali, Assamese, Nepali, Oriya, Bhojpuri, Punjabi and Tulu languages. Ghoshal's career began when she won the Sa Re Ga Ma Pa contest as an adult. Her Bollywood playback singing career began with Sanjay Leela Bhansali's Devdas, for which she received her first National Film Award for Best Female Playback Singer along with Filmfare Award for Best Female Playback Singer and Filmfare RD Burman Award for New Music Talent. She sang more than 102 songs in Malayalam.

== Film songs ==
She sang more than 113 Film songs till october 2025 in Malayalam.

=== 2007 ===
Film	No	Song	Composer(s)	Lyricist(s)	Co-artist(s)
Big B	1	"Vidaparayukayano"	Alphons Joseph	Santhosh Varma	

=== 2009 ===
Film	No	Song	Composer(s)	Lyricist(s)	Co-artist(s)
Sagar Alias Jacky Reloaded	2	"Vennilave"	Gopi Sunder	Rhea Joy	M. G. Sreekumar
Banaras	3	"Chandu Thottille"	M. Jayachandran	Gireesh Puthenchery	
Banaras	4	"Maduram Gaayati"	M. Jayachandran	Gireesh Puthenchery	Sudeep Kumar
Njan Brahma	5	"Idho Enthan Deivam"	Ilayaraja	Vaali	
Neelathamara	6	"Anuraaga Vilochananayi"	Vidyasagar	Vayalar Sarath Chandra Varma	V. Sreekumar

=== 2010 ===
Film	No	Song	Composer(s)	Lyricist(s)	Co-artist(s)
Aagathan	6	"Manju Mazha" (Female Version)	Ouseppachan	Kaithapram Damodaran Namboothiri	
Anwar	7	"Kizhakku Pookkum"	Gopi Sunder	Rafeeq Ahamed	Naveen Iyer, Sabri Brothers, Raqueeb Alam
Anwar	8	"Kanninima Neele"	Gopi Sunder	Rafeeq Ahamed	Naresh Iyer

=== 2011 ===
Film	No	Song	Composer(s)	Lyricist(s)	Co-artist(s)
Khaddama	9	"Vidhuramee Yaathra" (Duet Version)	Bennet–Veetraag	Rafeeq Ahamed	Hariharan
Living Together	10	"Paattinte Palkadavil" (Female Version)	M. Jayachandran	Kaithapram Damodaran Namboothiri	
Manikyakkallu	11	"Chembarathi Kammalittu"	M. Jayachandran	Anil Panachooran	Ravisankar
Rathinirvedam	12	"Kannoram Chingaram"	M. Jayachandran	Murukan Kattakada	
Rathinirvedam	13	"Madhumasa Mounaragam"	M. Jayachandran	Murukan Kattakada	
Salt N' Pepper	14	"Kaana Mullal" (Duet Version)	Bijibal	Santhosh Varma	Ranjith
Salt N' Pepper	15	"Kaana Mullal" (Female Version)	Bijibal	Santhosh Varma	
Pranayam	16	"Paattil Ee Paattil" (Female Version)	M. Jayachandran	O. N. V. Kurup	
Pranayam	17	"Mazhathulli Palunkukal"	M. Jayachandran	O. N. V. Kurup	Vijay Yesudas
Snehaveedu	18	"Aavani Thumbi"	Ilaiyaraaja	Rafeeq Ahamed	
Veeraputhran	19	"Kannodu Kannoram"	Ramesh Narayan	Rafeeq Ahamed	
Veeraputhran	20	"Kannodu Kannoram" (Reprise Version)	Ramesh Narayan	Rafeeq Ahamed	
Swapna Sanchari	21	"Kilikal Paadum" (Female Version)	M. Jayachandran	Rafeeq Ahamed	
Swapna Sanchari	22	"Kilikal Paadum" (Duet Version)	M. Jayachandran	Rafeeq Ahamed	Vijay Yesudas
Happy Durbar	23	"Vazhikunnu Veruthe"	Suryanarayan	Subhash Cherthala	
Vellaripravinte Changathi	24	"Pathinezhinte Poonkaralil" (Female Version)	Mohan Sithara	Vayalar Sarath Chandra Varma	
Vellaripravinte Changathi	25	"Pathinezhinte Poonkaralil" (Duet Version)	Mohan Sithara	Vayalar Sarath Chandra Varma	Kabeer
Dam 999	26	Mujhe Chod Ke	Ousepachan	Sojan Roy	

=== 2012 ===
Film	No	Song	Composer(s)	Lyricist(s)	Co-artist(s)
Spanish Masala	27	"Aarezhuthi Aavo"	Vidyasagar	R. Venugopal	Karthik
Nidra	28	"Shalaba Mazha Peyyumi"	Jassie Gift	Rafeeq Ahamed	
Ordinary	29	"Enthinee Mizhi"	Vidyasagar	Rajeev Nair	Karthik
Mallu Singh	30	"Cham Cham"	M. Jayachandran	Murukan Kattakada	K. J. Yesudas
Mallu Singh	31	"Punjabi Prayer"	M. Jayachandran	Traditional	
Bachelor Party	32	"Karmukilin"	Rahul Raj	Rafeeq Ahamed	Nikhil Mathew
Kalikaalam	33	"Thoovelli Kasavulla"	Ouseppachan	O. N. V. Kurup	
Cinema Company	34	"Aaromal"	Alphons Joseph	Rafeeq Ahamed	
Chattakkari	35	"Nilave Nilave"	M. Jayachandran	Rajeev Alunkal	Sudeep Kumar
Chattakkari	36	"Kurumozhiyude"	M. Jayachandran	Rajeev Alunkal	
916	37	"Naattumaviloru Maina"	M. Jayachandran	Rafeeq Ahamed	

=== 2013 ===
Film	No	Song	Composer(s)	Lyricist(s)	Co-artist(s)
Ente	38	"Paava Njaan Kalippava Njaan"	Shantanu Moitra	Payyambra Jayakumar	
Ente	39	"Paava Njaan Kalippava Njaan" (Unplugged Version)	Shantanu Moitra	Payyambra Jayakumar	
Ente	40	"Paava Njaan Kalippava Njaan" (Humming Version)	Shantanu Moitra	Payyambra Jayakumar	
Ithu Pathiramanal	41	"Eriveyil"	Afzal Yusuf	Vayalar Sarath Chandra Varma	
Sound Thoma	42	"Oru Kaaryam"	Gopi Sunder	Murukan Kattakada	Udit Narayan
August Club	43	"Vaathil Chaarumo"	Bennet–Veetraag	Rafeeq Ahamed	Srinivas
Radio Jockey	46	"Paattu Konddoru"	Santhosh Varma		

=== 2014 ===
Film	No	Song	Composer(s)	Lyricist(s)	Co-artist(s)
Pranayakatha	47	"Manji Mungippongi" (Duet Version)	Alphons Joseph	Rafeeq Ahamed	Naresh Iyer
Pranayakatha	48	"Manji Mungippongi" (Female Version)	Alphons Joseph	Rafeeq Ahamed	
Salalah Mobiles	49	"Earan Kaatin Eenam Pole"	Gopi Sunder	B. K. Harinarayanan	
How Old Are You?	50	"Vijanathayil"	Gopi Sunder	Rafeeq Ahamed	
Mylanchi Monchulla Veedu	51	"Wahida" (Duet Version)	Afzal Yusuf	Rafeeq Ahamed	Ranjith
Mylanchi Monchulla Veedu	52	"Wahida" (Female Version)	Afzal Yusuf	Rafeeq Ahamed	
Cousins	53	"Kolussu Thenni Thenni"	M. Jayachandran	Murukan Kattakada	Yazin Nizar, Tippu

=== 2015 ===
Film	No	Song	Composer(s)	Lyricist(s)	Co-artist(s)
Ennu Ninte Moideen	54	"Kannondu Chollanu"	M. Jayachandran	Rafeeq Ahamed	Vijay Yesudas
Ennu Ninte Moideen	55	"Kaathirunnu"	M. Jayachandran	Rafeeq Ahamed	
Life of Josutty	56	"Mele Mele" (Solo Version)	Anil Johnson	Santhosh Varma	
Life of Josutty	57	"Mele Mele" (Duet Version)	Anil Johnson	Santhosh Varma	Najim Arshad
Saigal Paadukayanu	58	"Monjathy"	M. Jayachandran	Rafeeq Ahamed	Madhu Balakrishnan
Anarkali	59	"Mohabath Mein"	Vidyasagar	Manoj Muntashir	Shadab Faridi
Akkal Dhamayile Pennu	60	"Otta Kuyil"	Alphons Joseph	Anil Panachooran	
Charlie	61	"Puthumazhayai"	Gopi Sunder	Rafeeq Ahamed	

=== 2016 ===
Film	No	Song	Composer(s)	Lyricist(s)	Co-artist(s)
Monsoon Mangoes	62	"Rosie"	Jakes Bejoy	Manoj Kuroor	Jakes Bejoy
10 Kalpanakal	63	"Rithu Shalabhame" (Duet Version)	Mithun Eshwar	Roy Puramadam	Uday Ramachandran
10 Kalpanakal	64	"Rithu Shalabhame" (Female Version)	Mithun Eshwar	Roy Puramadam	

=== 2017 ===
Film	No	Song	Composer(s)	Lyricist(s)	Co-artist(s)	Note(s)
Munthirivallikal Thalirkkumbol	65	"Athimarakombile"	M. Jayachandran	Rafeeq Ahamed	Vijay Yesudas	
Ramante Edanthottam	66	"Akale Oru Kaandite"	Bijibal	Santosh Verma		
Theeram	67	"Njanum Neeyum"	Afzal Yusuf	B. K. Harinarayanan	Quincy Chettupally	
Clint	68	"Olathin Melathaal"	Ilaiyaraaja	Prabha Varma		
Clint	69	"Olathin Melathaal" (Sad Version)	Ilaiyaraaja	Prabha Varma		
Naval Enna Jewel	70	"Neelambal Nilavodu"	M. Jayachandran	Kavyamayi Renji Lal		
Naval Enna Jewel	71	"Rakkadalala"	M. Jayachandran	Rafeeq Ahamed	Haricharan	
Zacharia Pothen Jeevichirippundu	72	"Vadathi Katte"	Dhibu Ninan Thomas	K. K. Roy		
Mersal	73	"Neeyalle Neeyalle"	A. R. Rahman	Mankombu Gopalakrishnan	Vijay Yesudas	Dubbed Version
Vimaanam	74	"Vaaniluyare"	Gopi Sunder	Rafeeq Ahamed	Najim Arshad	

=== 2018 ===
Film	No	Song	Composer(s)	Lyricist(s)	Co-artist(s)
Aami	75	"Neer Maathalam"	M. Jayachandran	Rafeeq Ahamed	Arnab Dutta
Aami	76	"Pranayamayi Radha"	M. Jayachandran	Rafeeq Ahamed	Vijay Yesudas
Captain	77	"Paalthira Paadum"	Gopi Sundar	Rafeeq Ahamed	
Poomaram	78	"Neramayi"(Female)	Faisal Rasi	Ajeesh Dasan	
Uncle	79	"Eeran Marum"	Bijibal	Rafeeq Ahamed	
My Story	80	"Mizhi Mizhi"	Shaan Rahman	B. K. Harinarayanan	Haricharan
Neerali	81	"Azhake Azhake"(Duet)	Stephen Devassy	P. T. Binu	Mohanlal
Neerali	82	"Azhake Azhake"(Female)	Stephen Devassy	P. T. Binu	
Theevandi	83	"Jeevamshamayi"	Kailas Menon	B. K. Harinarayanan	K. S. Harisankar
Kayamkulam Kochunni	84	"Kalariyadavum"	Gopi Sundar	Shobin Kannangatt	Vijay Yesudas
Odiyan	85	"Kondoram"	M. Jayachandran	Rafeeq Ahamed	Sudeep Kumar
Odiyan	86	"Maanam Thudukkanu"	M. Jayachandran	Rafeeq Ahamed	

=== 2019 ===
Film	No	Song	Composer(s)	Lyricist(s)	Co-artist(s)
Neeyum Njanum	87	"Kungumanira Sooryan"	Vinu Thomas	B. K. Harinarayanan	
Mera Naam Shaji	88	"Manasukkulla" (Duet Version)	Emil Mohammad	Santhosh Varma	Ranjith
Mera Naam Shaji	89	"Manasukkulla" (Female Version)	Emil Mohammad	Santhosh Varma	
Vaarikkuzhiyile Kolapathakam	90	"Kanniveyil Kannukalil"	Mejo Joseph	Kaushik Menon	Shobin Kannangatt
Marconi Mathai	91	"Pathiravinum"	M. Jayachandran	B K Harinarayanan	Yazin Nizar
Chila New Gen Nattuvisheshangal	92	"Poovu Chodichu"(Female)	M. Jayachandran	East Coast Vijayan	
Sye Raa Narasimha Reddy (D)	93	"Sye Raa Title Track"	Amit Trivedi	Siju Thuravoor	Sunidhi Chauhan
Sye Raa Narasimha Reddy (D)	94	"Neram Aagatham"	Amit Trivedi	Siju Thuravoor	
Nalppathiyonnu	95	"Mele Meghakkombil"	Bijibal	Rafeeq Ahammed	
Mamangam	96	"Mukkuthi"	M. Jayachandran	Rafeeq Ahammed	

=== 2021 ===
Film	No	Song	Composer(s)	Lyricist(s)	Co-artist(s)
Marakkar: Arabikadalinte Simham	97	"Ilaveyil"	Ronnie Raphael	Praba Varma	M. G. Sreekumar

=== 2022 ===
Film	No	Song	Composer(s)	Lyricist(s)	Co-artist(s)
Cobra	98	"Thumbi Thullal"	A. R. Rahman	Vinayak Sasikumar	Sreekanth Hariharan
Ponniyin Selvan: I	99	"Rakshasa Maamane"	A. R. Rahman	Rafeeq Ahamed	Palakkad Sreeram, Mahesh Vinayakram

=== 2023 ===
Film	No	Song	Composer(s)	Writer(s)	Co-artist(s)
Ayisha	100	"Ayisha Ayisha"	M. Jayachandran	BK Harinarayanan	
Ayisha	101	"Masalama"	M. Jayachandran	BK Harinarayanan	
King of Kotha	102	"Kalapakkaara"	Jakes Bejoy	Joe Paul	Benny Dayal, Jakes Bejoy
Otta	103	"Peyneer Poley"	M. Jayachandran	Rafeeq Ahamed	Benny Dayal
Qurbani	104	"Kanmani Nee"	Afzal Yusuf	Ajeesh Dasan	
Adiyantharavasthakalathe Anuragam	105	"Swargathil Vaazhum"	Afzal Yusuf	Titus Attingal	
Zam Zam	106	"Bhoomikum Meethe"	Amit Trivedi	Rafeeq Ahamed	Haricharan

=== 2024 ===
Film	No	Song	Composer(s)	Lyricist(s)	Co-artist(s)	Note(s)
Pushpa 2 (Dubbed)	107	"Kandaalo" (The Couple Song)	Devi Sri Prasad	Siju Thuravoor		

=== 2026 ===
Film	No	Song	Composer(s)	Lyricist(s)	Co-artist(s)	Note(s)
Magic Mushrooms	108	"Thalodi Marayuvathevide nee" (Duet Version)	Nadirshah	B.K.Harinarayanan	Hanan Shaah	
Magic Mushrooms	109	"Thalodi Marayuvathevide nee" (Female Version)	Nadirshah	B.K.Harinarayanan		

== Non-Film Songs ==
=== 2009 ===
Album	No	Song	Composer(s)	Writer(s)	Co-artist(s)
Ennennum	1	Arikilumilla Nee	Vijay Karun		

=== 2013 ===
Film	No	Song	Composer(s)	Lyricist(s)	Co-artist(s)
Nandagopalam	2	"Kandunjan Kannane"	Ramesh Narayan	Vayalar Madhavan Kutty	

=== 2014 ===
Film	No	Song	Composer(s)	Lyricist(s)	Co-artist(s)
Yelove	3	"Moovanthi Chayum"	Ajith Mathew	Ajith Mathew	Siddharth Menon
God	4	"Mazhayilum Veyililum" (Female Version)	M. Jayachandran	M. R. Jayageetha	

=== 2015 ===
Film	No	Song	Composer(s)	Lyricist(s)	Co-artist(s)
Yelove Unplugged	5	"Moovanthi Chayum" (Unplugged Version)	Ajith Mathew	Ajith Mathew	

=== 2025 ===
Film	No	Song	Composer(s)	Lyricist(s)	Co-artist(s)
Porukatte	6	"Porukatte"	Afzal Yusuf	Quincy Chettupally	
