= Mariyam Mukku =

2015 Indian romantic fantasy drama film

- Theatrical poster
- Directed by: James Albert
- Written by: James Albert
- Produced by: A. K. Sabeer
- Starring: Fahadh Faasil; Manoj K. Jayan; Prathap Pothan; Joy Mathew; Sana Althaf
- Cinematography: Gireesh Gangadharan
- Edited by: Ranjan Abraham
- Music by: Vidyasagar
- Production company: Sam Big Movies
- Distributed by: LJ Films Pvt. Ltd
- Release date: 23 January 2015
- Running time: 137 minutes
- Country: India
- Language: Malayalam

Mariyam Mukku is a 2015 Indian Malayalam-language romantic fantasy drama written and directed by James Albert. It marks the directorial debut of screenwriter James. The film was distributed by LJ Films and stars Fahadh Faasil and Sana Althaf in the lead roles along with Manoj K. Jayan, Joy Mathew, Irshad, Sadiq, Nandu, Prathap Pothan, and Saju Navodaya in other important roles. The film score and songs were composed by Vidyasagar.

The film depicts a love story between Felix, (Fahadh Faasil) and Salomi (Sana Althaf) who live in Mariyam Mukku, a coastal area with a unique Latin Christian culture. The movie was shot at Tangasseri beach in Kollam. The film was released on 23 January 2015 in theatres and met with negative reviews from critics.

== Cast ==
- Fahadh Faasil as Felix
  - Nebish Benson as teen Felix
    - Eric Zachariah as younger Felix
- Sana Althaf as Salomi
- Manoj K. Jayan as Palamukkil Pawlos
- Pratap Pothan as Father Gabriel
- Spencer Cruz as Auctioneer (Lelakkaran) Christy
- Santhosh Keezhattoor as Bernard, Felix's father
- Joy Mathew as Karamoottil Varkey (Salomi's father)
- Aju Varghese as Lloyd Casper Anderson
- Irshad as Kaala George
- Neeraj Madhav as Dennis
- Nandu as Mullan Joseph
- Sadiq as Earnest
- Sreejith Ravi as Lorenze
- Kundara Johny as DYSP Paul
- Saju Navodaya as Nazareth
- Devi Ajith as Kathreena
- Suja Menon as Jancy
- Reena Basheer as Clara
- Seema G. Nair as Marykutty
- Veena Nair as Anna
- Meena Ganesh as Mariyamma
- Dinesh Prabhakar as Charlie
- Subeesh Sudhi as Chandy
- Omana Ouseph as Aleyamma
- Kalashala Babu as Wilfred

== Production & Casting ==
The filming started in October 2014 and was shot at Lighthouse, Vizhinjam and Kappil. The shooting was meant to be completed in two schedules, and the film was set to release by 23 January 2015. It was earlier reported that Hima Davis would play the female lead. However, it was later confirmed that Sana had replaced her. She was earlier seen in Vikramadithyan (2014).

A teaser was released by LJ Films on 21 December 2014, following by a second teaser released on 6 January 2015.

== Music ==
Mariyam Mukku

Soundtrack album by Vidyasagar
- Released: 2 January 2015
- Recorded: Varsha Vallaki Studios
- Genre: Feature film soundtrack
- Length: 19:17
- Language: Malayalam
- Label: Muzik 247
- Producer: Vidyasagar

Vidyasagar chronology
Bhaiyya Bhaiyya (2014)	Mariyam Mukku (2015)	Ennum Eppozhum (2015)

The film features four tracks composed by Vidyasagar. He has composed a different kind of music while retaining his trademark style of melody. All the songs garnered fine appreciation from critics. Ee Kadalinu Kolu brings the feel of rain, storm, sea, and love – all blending together, indicating the blossoming of love between the lovers in a monsoon. Kavil, with a Latin-American flavour, has been composed as a folk song recounting how the Portuguese had come and gone. Swargam Thurannu, with its divine feel, is a Christmas night carol song. With Mekkarayil, there is a change happening in the seashore. As the waves come and go, this song even though fast-paced, gives the feel of each line coming and going.

Track#	Title	Singer(s)	Lyrics	Length
1	"Ee Kadalinu Kolu"	K. J. Yesudas, Sujatha	Vayalar Sarath Chandra Varma	5:05
2	"Kavil"	Kavalam Sreekumar, Najim Arshad	Santhosh Varma	4:18
3	"Swargam Thurannu"	Chorus	Father. Ziyon	4:36
4	"Mekkarayil"	Ranjini Jose, Jithin	Rafeeq Ahammed	5:22

== Reception ==
The film received generally negative reviews from critics and ended as a below-average grosser at the Kerala box office. It was an anticipated movie which is the directorial debut of scriptwriter James Albert known for scripting popular Malayalam films. But here, the weak screenplay was the major drawback. The script failed to narrate the theme which was a blend of realism and fantasy. The plot which develops with the feel of a love story, suddenly takes a complete track change into a fantasy drama. The unbalanced plot left the audience totally clueless about the intention of the movie.
