= Super 4 (Indian TV series) =

- Poster
- Genre: Reality; Singing talent show
- Presented by: Vidya (Season 1); V Vidhya Vijayakumar, Vijay Ashok (Season 2); Mithun Ramesh (Season 3)
- Judges: Season 1: Sujatha Mohan; Deepak Dev; Sharreth; Shaan Rahman; Season 2 ,3: Rimi Tomy; Jyotsna Radhakrishnan; Vidhu Prathap; Sithara Krishnakumar
- Country of origin: India
- Original language: Malayalam
- No. of seasons: 3
- No. of episodes: 63 (Season 1); 100 (Season 2) 50 (season 3)

Production
- Production location: Kerala
- Camera setup: Multi-camera
- Running time: About 51 minutes per episode

Original release
- Network: Mazhavil Manorama
- Release: 2018 – 2022

Related
- Indian Voice, Paadam Namuk Paadam

Super 4 is a weekend Malayalam musical reality show which airs on Mazhavil Manorama and streams on ManoramaMAX.

== Format ==
The musical extravaganza consisted of 16 singers from all over India, screened and chosen after several rounds of auditions. The highlight of the show is that the contestants choose one of the judges to be their captain who would groom them during their journey in the show.

== Season 1 ==
The season consisted of 16 contestants who were selected from auditions across Kerala. The season was judged by a panel of four. The contestants were divided into four groups, each led a judge. Shweta, Vyshakhan, Sreehari and Dev Prakash were the finalists. The season lasted from 4 February 2018 and to 22 October 2018.

=== Hosts ===
- Vidhya
- Vijitha (co-host in grand finale)

=== Judges ===
- Sujatha Mohan
- Shaan Rahman
- Deepak Dev
- Sharreth

=== Mentor ===
- Alphons Joseph

=== Winners ===
Position	Artists	Results	
1	Sreehari Raveendran	Winner	Sujathamohan Team
2	Vaisakhan	First runner up	sharreth Team
3	Swetha	Second runner up	Shanrahman Team
4	Dev Prakash	Third runner up	Deepakdev Team

== Season 2 ==
The channel launched the Season 2 on September 05, 2020. The format of the show is there is total of 16 contestants and they equally divide 16 contestants into four groups named Vidhuannan jagajillies, Rimu jagajillies, Sithumani jagajillies and Jobaby jagajillies.. Show went off on October 10, 2021 by Grand Finale. The Season 2 of Super 4 was called Super 4 Juniors and Seniors.

=== Hosts ===
- Vijay Ashok
- Vidhya

=== Judges ===
- Rimi Tomy
- Jyotsna Radhakrishnan
- Vidhu Prathap
- Sithara Krishnakumar
- Anoop Shankar (groomer)

=== Grand finale judges ===
- Ouseppachan
- Alphons Joseph

=== Guests ===
- Manju Warrier
- Aparna Balamurali
- Asha Sharath
- Samyuktha Menon
- Shaan Rahman
- Gopi Sundar
- Anu Sithara
- Prayaga Martin
- Ramesh Pisharody
- Anna Ben
- Benny P. Nayarambalam
- Sunny Wayne
- Aishwarya Lekshmi
- Remya Nambeesan
- Namitha Pramod

=== Winners - seniors ===
Position	Artists	Results	
1	Abhijith Anilkumar	Winner	Vidhuannan Jagajillies
2	Sreelekshmi	First runner up	Jobaby Jagajillies
3	Amal. C. Ajith	Finalist	sithumani Jagajillies
4	Rajish	Finalist	Rimu's Jagajillies

== Season 3 ==
The channel launched Season 3 exclusively for kids as a sequel to Super 4 Junior vs. Seniors titles Super 4 Juniors from 16 October 2021 to 10 April 2022.

=== Hosts ===
Main host

- Mithun Ramesh

Replacement host

- Juliet

=== Judges ===
Primary judges

- Rimi Tomy / Vijay Yesudas
- Jyotsna Radhakrishnan
- Vidhu Prath
- Sithara Krishnakumar
- Anoop Shankar (Groomer)

Grand finale judges

- Madhu Balakrishnan
- Bijibal

=== Mentor ===
- Anju Joseph

=== Guests ===
- Jayaram
- Anu Sithara
- Unni Mukundan
- Miya George
- Vineeth Kumar
- Rajisha Vijayan
- Innocent
- Vijay Yesudas
- Vinay Forrt
- Shane Nigam
- Aditi Ravi
- Prayaga Martin
- Durga Krishna

=== Winners ===
Position	Artists	Results	Team
1	Ruth	Winner	Rimitomy jagajillies
2	Nandana	runner up	sithara Jagajillies
3	Mebin	runner up	vidhu Jagajillies
4	Bhadri	runner up	Jyotsna Jagajillies

== Rounds ==
- From the Heart Round
- Duet Round
- Ammaydoppam Round
- Favourite Music Director Round
- Favourite Emotion Round
- Duet Round
