= Sajna Najam =

Indian dance choreographer

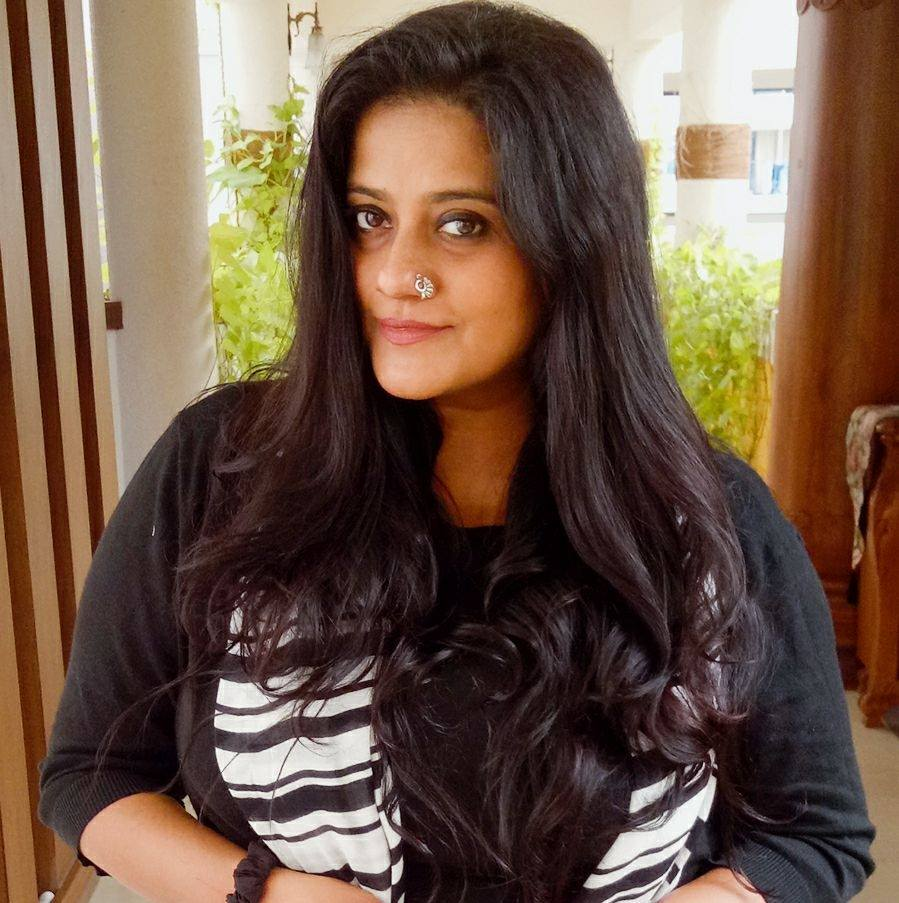
- Born: Chirayinkeezhu, Kerala, India
- Occupation: Dance choreographer
- Years active: 2000–present
- Spouse: Mohammed Najam
- Children: 2
- Relatives: Sana Althaf (niece)
- Awards: Best Choreography in 2014 for Vikramadithyan

Sajna Najam (born 22 February 1971) is an Indian dance choreographer who has worked in all the regional film industries. She started her career in 2000 in television and stage events, before working in films. She won the Kerala state award for best choreographer for 2014, film Vikramadithyan directed by Lal Jose. Veteran film actor Prem Nazir is a relative.

== Early life ==
Sajna Najam was born into a Muslim family in Chirayinkeezh, Trivandrum to M A Nazar & Aysha. Her grandfather M A Rasheed constructed his first theatre in 1957 named Kadheeja, which is still considered one of the biggest theatres in Kerala, before moving into film production. His first movie, Koodapirappu marked the debut of Prem Nawas (who is younger brother of perennial Malayalam cinema hero Prem Nazir). The film was also the film career debut of the great poet and lyricist of Malayalam language, Vayalar Ramavarma. She has a sister, Shameena Althaf who is the mother of actor Sana Althaf.

== Career ==
Sajna started her dancing career in 2000. Starting as a groomer and choreographer for many reality shows, she and her team “Zarinans” made their mark in the television industry. She eventually moved to the Malayalam film industry. Her career changed when was offered to choreograph for a film by director Lal Jose. She won Best Choreography in 2014 for Vikramadithyan. In 2020 she worked with Vijay Sethupathi for a Tamil film, Yaadhum Oore Yaavarum Kelir .

== Filmography ==
Year	Film
2020	Al Mallu
2019	Argentina Fans Kaattoorkadavu
2019	Allu Ramendran
2018	Oru Kuprasidha Payyan
2018	Parole (2018 film)
2017	Kaattu
2017	Ayaal Jeevichirippund
2017	Sakhavu (2017 film)
2017	Basheerinte Premalekhanam
2017	Solo (2017 film)
2016	Kuttikalundu Sookshikkuka
2015	Mili (2015 film)
2015	Kumbasaram
2015	Thinkal Muthal Velli Vare
2015	Chandrettan Evideya
2015	KL 10 Patthu
2014	Vikramadithyan
2014	Manglish (film)
2013	Ayaal
2006	Baalyam
2005	Kalyana Kurimanam

Anchinod injodu inchu ( Surya Tv - 2021) choreographer - title song for Suresh Gopi

== TV dance shows ==
- Dance kerala dance- Zee keralam
- Munch Dance Dance - Asianet
- Comedy Super Nite - Flowers TV
- Kuttikalavara - Flowers TV
- Let's Dance - Amrita TV
- Super Star - Amrita TV
- Vanitha Ratnam - Amrita TV
- Super dancer - Amrita TV
- D4Dance - Mazhavil Manorama
- Josco Indian Voice - Mazhavil Manorama
- VerutheAlla Bhaarya - Mazhavil Manorama
- Junior idol - Jaihind TV
- Golden talent - Jaihind TV
- Gandharvasangeetham - KairaliTV
