= Anju Joseph =

Indian playback singer

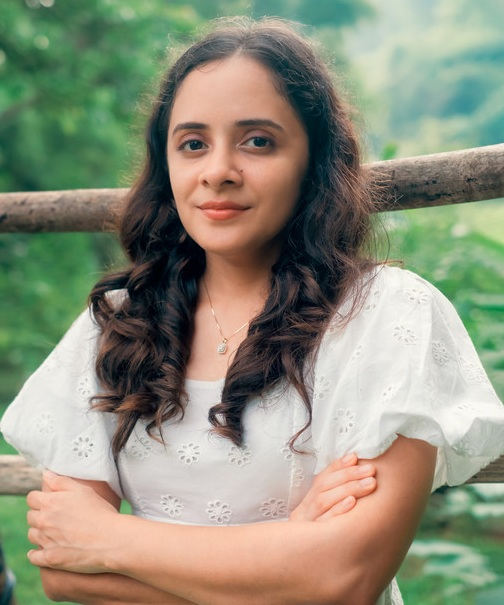

Background information
- Born: Anju Joseph; 8 November 1990 (age 35); Kanjirappally, Kerala, India
- Occupation: Playback singer
- Instrument: Piano
- Years active: 2007–present
- Spouse: Aditya Parameswaran (m. 2024)

Anju Joseph is an Indian playback singer in Malayalam cinema. She started her career as a playback singer in Malayalam movie Doctor Love in 2011.

== Early life and family ==
Anju was born at Kanjirappally in Kottayam district of Kerala. She studied at St. Joseph's Public School and St. Antony's Public School in Kanjirappally. She then completed her B.A. from St. Teresa's College, Kochi, and M.A. from Maharaja's College, Kochi.

Anju was one of the contestants of Asianet Idea Star Singer Season 4, and she became the third runner-up of the show Gandharva Sangeetham.

Anju was married to Anoop John, who was a reality show director. They later separated. She was then married to Aditya Parameswaran on November 30, 2024.

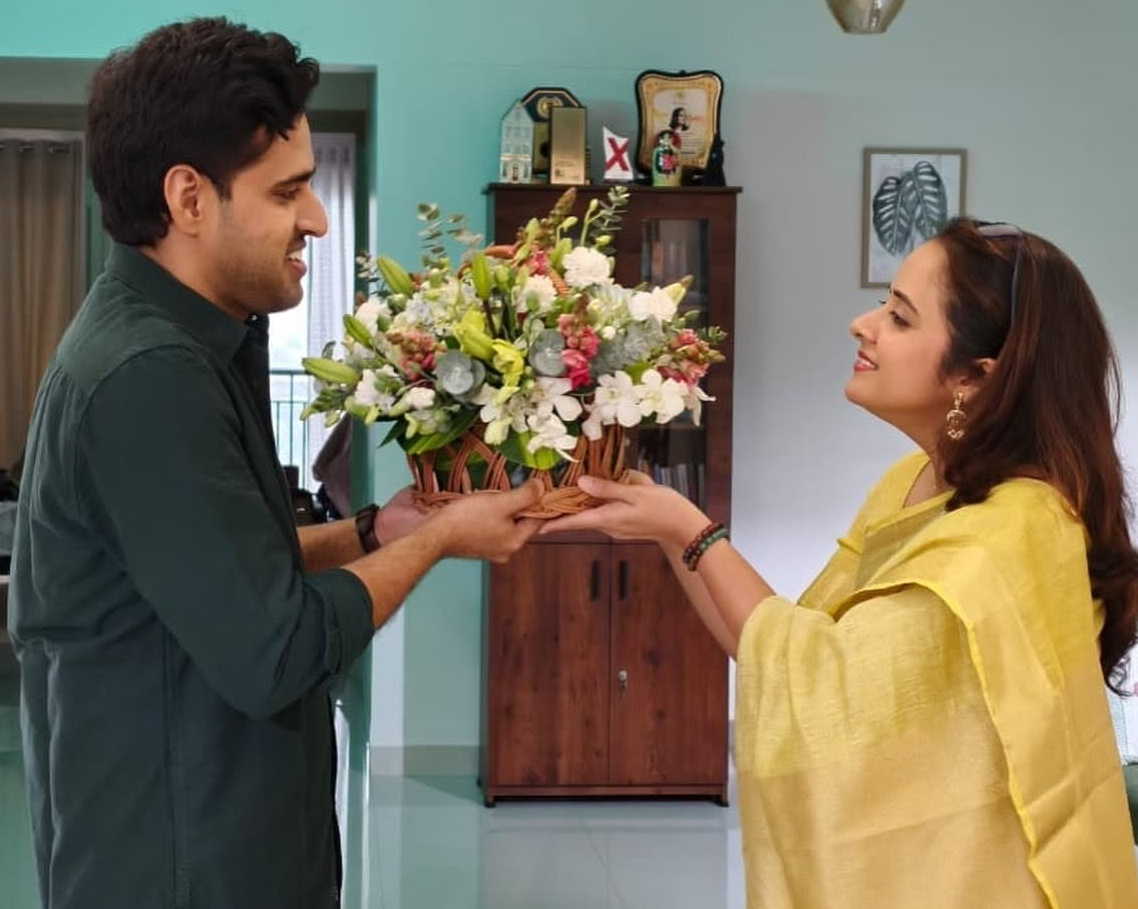
Anju Joseph with Aditya Parameswaran.

== Career ==
She started her career for films like Doctor Love, Alamara, Avarude Raavukal, Ormakalil Oru Manjukaalam, C/O Saira Banu. Another career break in her life was in 2016, when she released an a cappella version of the song Dheewara from the famous film Bahubali. She was personally called and congratulated and This created a major trend in Telugu industry and her team was invited to perform for the Cinemaa Awards in Hyderabad.

=== Films ===
List of Anju Joseph film credits
| Year | Film | Role | Language | Notes | Ref. |
|---|---|---|---|---|---|
| 2022 | Archana 31 Not Out | Saranya | Malayalam | | |
| 2022 | Roy | Soumya | Malayalam | | |

=== Television appearance ===
| Year | show | Role | Notes | Ref. |
|---|---|---|---|---|
| 2009-2010 | Idea Star Singer season 4 | Contestant | | |
| 2021-2022 | Super 4 season 2 | Co host | | |
| 2022-Present | Start Music Aaradhyam Paadum | Singer | | |

== Discography ==
=== As a Singer ===
List of Anju Joseph film credits as a singer
| Year | Film | Director | Music Director | Song |
|---|---|---|---|---|
| 2011 | Doctor Love | K. Biju | Vinu Thomas | 1.Nannaavoola |
| 2016 | Ormakalil Oru Manjukaalam | Antony Abraham | Antony Abraham | 1.Ariyathe Ente Jeevanil |
| 2017 | Alamara | Midhun Manuel Thomas | Sooraj S. Kurup | 1.Poovakum Neeyen |
| 2017 | Avarude Raavukal | Shanil Muhammed | Sankar Sharma | 1.Ethetho Swapnamo |
| 2017 | C/O Saira Banu | Antony Sony Sebastian | Mejo Joseph | |
