= 45th Kerala State Film Awards =

Indian awards ceremony held in 2015

- Awarded for: Best of Malayalam Cinema in 2014
- Date: 10 August 2015
- Location: Thiruvananthapuram
- Country: India
- Presented by: Kerala State Chalachitra Academy
- First award: 1969
- Website: http://www.keralafilm.com

The 45th Kerala State Film Awards were presented by the chief minister of Kerala Oommen Chandy on 26 December 2015. Mohanlal was the chief guest at the awards ceremony.

== Jury ==
The 10-member jury, headed by John Paul, was composed of people representing different areas of cinema: Directors : Bhadran (director), Suresh Unnithan and Balu Kiriyath, sound recordist Renjith, cameraman Sunny Joseph, Rajamani, G. Murali, S. Rajendran Nair, and producer M. M. Hamsa. The jury for writings on cinema was chaired by Satheesh Babu Payyannur. Raja Narayanan and A Padmanabhan were the other members of the panel.

== Winners ==
Most Awards

Number of Awards	Films
5	Iyobinte Pusthakam
3	Bangalore Days, Om Shanti Oshana, White Boys

Name of Award	Awardee(s)	Name of Film	Remarks
Best Film	Jayaraj (Director); K. Mohanan (Producer)	Ottaal	
Second Best Film	M. B. Padmakumar (Director); Rejimon K. A. (Producer)	My Life Partner	
Best Director	Sanal Kumar Sasidharan	Oraalppokkam	
Best Film with Popular Appeal and Aesthetic Value	Jude Anthany Joseph (Director); Alvin Antony (Producer)	Om Shanti Oshana	
Best Children's Film	T. Deepesh (Director); Pradeep Kandari (Producer)	Ankuram	
Best Actor	Sudev Nair	My Life Partner	
Best Actor	Nivin Pauly	• Bangalore Days • 1983	
Best Actress	Nazriya Nazim	• Bangalore Days • Om Shanti Oshana	
Second Best Actor	Anoop Menon	• 1983 • Vikramadithyan	
Second Best Actress	Sethulakshmi	How Old Are You?	
Best Child Artist	Master Adwaith	Ankuram	
Best Child Artist	Anna Fathima	Randu Penkuttikal	
Best Debut Director	Abrid Shine	1983	
Best Cinematography	Amal Neerad	Iyobinte Pusthakam	
Best Story	Sidhartha Siva	Ain	
Best Screenplay (Original)	Anjali Menon	Bangalore Days	
Best Screenplay (Adapted)	Ranjith	Njaan	
Best Lyrics	O. S. Unnikrishnan	La Sa Gu	"Ithra Pakalinodu"
Best Music Director	Ramesh Narayan	White Boys	"Aadithyakiranangal"
Best Background Music	Bijibal	Various films	
Best Male Singer	K. J. Yesudas	White Boys	"Aadithyakiranangal"
Best Female Singer	Shreya Ghoshal	How Old Are You?	"Vijanathayil Paathi Vazhi"
Best Dubbing Artist	Sharran Puthumana	White Boys	
Best Dubbing Artist	Vimmy Mariam George	Munnariyippu	
Best Choreography	Sajna Najam	Vikramadithyan	
Best Costume Designer	Sameera Saneesh	Various Films	
Best Makeup Artist	Manoj Angamali	Iyobinte Pusthakam	
Best Processing Lab/Colourist	Ranganathan (Prism & Pixels)	Iyobinte Pusthakam, Bangalore Days	
Best Film Editor	Lijo Paul	Om Shanti Oshana	
Best Sound Recordist	• Sandeep Kurissery • Jijimon Joseph	Oraalppokkam	Location Sound
Best Sound Recordist	Thapas Nayak	Iyobinte Pusthakam	Sound Design
Best Sound Recordist	N. Harikumar	Various films	Sound Mixing
Best Art Director	Indulal Kaveedu	Njan Ninnodukoodeyundu	
Special Jury Award	Pratap K. Pothen	Once upon a Time There was a Kallan	Acting
Special Mention	M. G. Swarasagar	Manalchitrangal	Singer (Kunjikkuruvikale, Doore Chaare Vachalamay)
Special Mention	Dr. George Mathew	Apothecary	Producer
Special Mention	A U P S Chembrassery	La Sa Gu	Producer
Special Mention	• Yakzan Gary Pereira • Neha Nair	Iyobinte Pusthakam	Music Direction
Special Mention	Indrans	Apothecary	Actor
Best Book on Cinema	V. K. Joseph	Athijeevanathinte Chalachithra Bhashyangal	
Best Article on Cinema	Ravi Menon	Shabdalokathe Ilaman Gaadha	
Best Article on Cinema	K. C. Jayachandran	Paayalu Pole Pranayam	
J. C. Daniel Award (Lifetime Achievement Award)	I. V. Sasi		

== See also ==
- 61st National Film Awards
