= Rinu Razak =

Indian playback singer and songwriter

- Born: Rinu Razak; 28 August 1996 (age 29); Alwaye (Aluva), Kerala, India
- Genres: Playback singer
- Occupations: Playback singer; Songwriter
- Years active: 2013–present
- Labels: Think Music India; T-Series; Aditya Music; Manorama Music; Muzik 247; Lahari Music

Rinu Razak is an Indian playback singer. She has performed songs for films such as Ohm Shanti Oshana, Praise The Lord, Ormayundo Ee Mugham, Vettah and Theeram.

== Career ==
Rinu Razak has associated with several music composers such as Shaan Rahman, Gopi Sundar, Armaan Malik, and Afzal Yusuf. In 2014, she debuted in playback singing with her songs "Mounam Chorum Neram" and "Sneham Cherum Neram" for the Malayalam movie Ohm Shanthi Oshaana. She had various soundtracks to her name such as "Sharon Vaniyil" (Praise the Lord), "Doore Doore" (Ormayundo Ee Mukham) and "Raavu Maayave" (Vettah).

In 2017, Rinu Razak debuted as a lyricist by writing the lyrics of 'Njan Varumee' for the movie Theeram.

She was the title-winner of the Reality Show 'Super Star Junior 2010' of Amrita TV and also the 'First Runner-up' of Media One TV's 'Pathinaaalam Ravu: Season One'.

== Personal life ==
Rinu Razak is originally from Manjeri. She is currently pursuing her Master's in English at The English and Foreign Languages University (EFLU).

== Discography ==
Year	Song	Film title	Composer	Co-Artist
2014	"Mounam Chorum Neram..."	Ohm Shanthi Oshaana	Shaan Rahman	Hesham Abdul Wahab
2014	"Sneham Cherum Neram..."	Ohm Shanthi Oshaana	Shaan Rahman	Hesham Abdul Wahab
2014	"Sharon Vaniyil..."	Praise the Lord	Shaan Rahman	Yazin Nizar
2015	"Doore Doore... (Reprise)"	Ormayundo Ee Mukham	Shaan Rahman	
2016	"Raavu Maayave..."	Vettah	Shaan Rahman	Shaan Rahman
2017	"Ee Nilavin..."	Pillers	Akhil P	Sidhesh
2017	"Aa Mizhikalil..."	Sonador	Roshad Rasheed	Hesham Abdul Wahab
2020	"Neeto Neno..."	World Famous Lover	Gopi Sundar	Siddharth Sawariya
