= Chembarathipoo =

2017 Indian film

- Directed by: Arun Vaiga
- Screenplay by: Arun Vaiga
- Produced by: Bhuvanendran; Sakaria
- Starring: Askar Ali; Aditi Ravi; Parvathy Arun
- Cinematography: Santhosh Anima
- Edited by: Arun Vaiga
- Music by: Rakesh A.R; Rhrithwik S. Chand
- Production company: MaxLab entertainment
- Distributed by: Dreams Screens
- Release date: 24 November 2017
- Running time: 148 minutes
- Country: India
- Language: Malayalam

Chembarathipoo (transl. Hibiscus flower) is a 2017 Indian Malayalam-language film directed by Arun Vaiga. The film features debutants Askar Ali and Aditi Ravi in lead roles.

== Plot ==
Vinod, a young guy who is nursing a broken heart after a failed first love is helped by his friends to recover from despair, only to fall head over heels in love with another girl.

== Cast ==
- Askar Ali as Vinod Sashi
- Aditi Ravi as Diya
- Parvathy Arun as Neena Jacob
- Vishak Nair
- Sunil Sukhada
- Aju Varghese as Mathai
- Dharmajan Bolgatty as Adipoli Ratheesh
- Sudheer Karamana
- Pradeep Kottayam
- Vijilesh
- Dinesh Nair
- Dain Davis as Vinod's friend (uncredited role)
