= RK Nagar (film) =

- Directed by: Saravana Rajan
- Produced by: Badri Kasthuri; V. Rajalakshmi
- Starring: Vaibhav; Sana Althaf; Anjena Kirti; Sampath Raj; Inigo Prabhakaran
- Cinematography: S. Venkatesh
- Edited by: Praveen K. L.
- Music by: Premgi Amaren
- Production companies: Black Ticket Company, Shraddha Entertainment
- Release date: 17 December 2019
- Running time: 132 minutes
- Country: India
- Language: Tamil

RK Nagar is a 2019 Indian Tamil-language political satire film written and directed by Saravana Rajan. The film stars Vaibhav, Sana Althaf, and Anjena Kirti, while Sampath Raj and Inigo Prabhakaran play supporting roles. The film's music is composed by Premgi Amaren with cinematography by S. Venkatesh and editing by Praveen K. L.. the film released on 17 December 2019 on Netflix even though it aimed to have a theatrical release.

Director Saravana Rajan has clarified that the film is not political, but according to the release of the film's teaser, it shows multitudes of political scenarios which took place in Tamil Nadu during the period of 2015–2017.

== Plot ==
Shankar (Vaibhav) is introduced in a dream song sequence, where he dreams of living a luxurious life with two wives at his service. When he wakes up, however, his ambition is entirely different: he claims that he has no interest in making wealth and no respect for people of fortune. Ranjini (Sana Althaf) comes from a rich background and is the daughter of Chairman Sundaramoorthy (Santhana Bharathi). She despises rowdy men, but when she sees Shankar chasing two goons with a machete in his hand, she falls for him. Meanwhile, there is a conflict between two rivals, Vishwanathan aka Lottai (Sampath Raj) and Manoj aka Mannu (Inigo Prabhakaran), Sundaramoorthy's nephew. However, Lottai is killed by Mannu, and Sundaramoorthy's son is also killed in Shankar's new tailor shop, causing him to get framed for murder. How Shankar uses his ways to prove that he is not involved in the murder forms the rest of the story. It is revealed that the schoolboys are the main culprits of sexual assaults on women, which caused them to commit suicide, including their teacher. They abducted Sundaramoorthy's son, but during the altercation between them, they killed him.

== Cast ==
- Vaibhav as Shankar
- Sana Althaf as Ranjini
- Anjena Kirti as Kamatchi
- Ambuli Gokulnath as Kanagavel aka Manga Madayan
- Sampath Raj as Vishwanathan aka Lottai
- Inigo Prabhakaran as Manoj aka Mannu
- Subbu Panchu as Inspector Nagendran
- Santhana Bharathi as Chairman Sundaramoorthy
- T. Siva as Chairman Damodaran
- Vaiyapuri as Pitchumani
- Shreekumar as Bharani
- Kutty Gopi as Shankar's friend
- Vichu as Manager Velu
- Sandhana Lakshmi as Sivagami, Shankar's mother
- Srilatha as Ranjini's mother
- Sree as Akash
- Akash Nath as Santhanu
- Uriyadi Chandru as Govindaraj
- Karthik Nag as Thandal
- Daffe Naveen as Senthil, tailor shop boy
- Stills Pandiyan as Politician
- Winner Ramachandran as Police Commissioner
- Amirthalingam as Head Constable
- Kumara Vadivel as School Principal
- Vicky as Export Company Dealer
- Pradeep R. Vijayan as Negative
- Karthik as Moneylender
- Akash Premkumar
- Karunakaran in a guest appearance
- Premgi Amaren in a guest appearance

== Production ==
In early May 2017, Venkat Prabhu announced that he would be producing a film titled RK Nagar, which would be directed by Saravana Rajan, who had previously made Vadacurry (2014). Vaibhav was cast in the lead role, with Sana Althaf signed to portray the lead actress and Sampath Raj chosen to portray the antagonist. Premgi Amaren, Praveen K. L., Vasuki Bhaskar, and S. Venkatesh were announced to be a part of the film's crew. Denying reports that the film was based on a political story, Saravana Rajan revealed the film would feature four narratives and compared the script to Maanagaram (2017). The film began production in June 2017 and was shot across Chennai and Pondicherry. Filming wrapped that December.

== Soundtrack ==
The music was composed by Premgi Amaren, and the audio rights were acquired by Muzik 247. Lyrics for the songs are written by Gangai Amaren, Kanchana Logan, Karpaga Rajan, and Parthi Bhaskar.

Track listing
No.	Title	Lyrics	Singer(s)	Length
1.	"Papara Mittai"	Kanchana Logan	Gana Guna	2:57
2.	"Adiye"	Gangai Amaran	Ranjith, Bhavatharini	4:04
3.	"Petthaapuram"	Karpaga Rajan	Malathi	4:19
4.	"Yei Oodu Oodu"	Parthi Bhasker	Vijay Yesudas	4:30
Total length:				15:50

== Release ==
After being delayed for over a year, the film was supposed to have its theatrical release in April 2019 but released directly on Netflix on 17 December 2019 before being taken down. The film got re-released on Netflix on 29 April 2020.

== Reception ==
Sudhir Suryawanshi of New Indian Express wrote, "Like a drunk man experiencing an occasional, fleeting moment of lucidity, RK Nagar, every now and then, seems to recognise its own astounding mediocrity." Vishal Menon of Film Companion wrote, "It's a film you'd think twice about watching even when theatres are safe, the wallet is full, popcorn nice and buttery and parking practically free." Srivatsan S of The Hindu wrote, "There is hardly anything exciting in this movie, let alone it being revolutionary."
