= Farhaan Faasil =

Indian actor

- Born: Ismail Fazil; 26 May 1990 (age 36); Alappuzha, Kerala, India
- Occupation: Actor
- Years active: 2014 – present
- Parents: Fazil; Rozina
- Relatives: Fahadh Faasil (brother); Nazriya Nazim (sister-in-law)

Ismail Fazil (born 26 May 1990), better known by his stage name Farhaan Faasil, is an Indian actor working in Malayalam cinema. He debuted in 2014 with Njan Steve Lopez directed by Rajeev Ravi. He is the younger son of filmmaker Fazil and brother of actor Fahadh Faasil.

== Early life ==
His elder brother Fahadh Faasil is also an actor in Malayalam cinema. Nazriya Nazim is his sister-in-law.

== Film career ==
Farhaan Faasil played the lead role in Rajeev Ravi's second directorial venture Njan Steve Lopez which was released in 2014. His next release was 2017 romantic-comedy film Basheerinte Premalekhanam directed by Aneesh Anwar.

== Filmography ==
Year	Film	Role	Notes	Ref.
2014	Njan Steve Lopez	Steve Lopez	SIIMA Award for Best Debut Actor	
2017	Basheerinte Premalekhanam	Basheer		
2019	Under World	Majeed		
2022	Bheeshma Parvam	Paul Anjoottikkaran		
2025	Thudarum	Sudheesh		
