= Ormayundo Ee Mukham =

- Film poster
- Directed by: Anvar Sadik
- Written by: Anvar Sadik
- Produced by: Jaison Elamgulam
- Starring: Vineeth Sreenivasan; Namitha Pramod; Aju Varghese
- Cinematography: Jithu Damodar
- Edited by: Johnkutty
- Music by: Shaan Rahman
- Production company: RJ Creations
- Distributed by: RJ Creations
- Release date: 14 November 2014
- Country: India
- Language: Malayalam
- Budget: ₹3.5crore
- Box office: ₹10crore net

Ormayundo Ee Mukham (transl. Do You Remember This Face?) is a 2014 Indian Malayalam-language romantic musical film written and directed by Anvar Sadik, starring Vineeth Sreenivasan and Namitha Pramod. The film's music was composed by Shaan Rahman. The film was released on 14 November 2014. It is inspired by the 2004 American film 50 First Dates.

== Plot ==
The story first shows Nithya, a sand artist doing her program. When she is on her way home, she gets into an accident, which leads to memory loss that can only allow her to remember anything for just 24 hours. She keeps a diary where she jots down all her memories.

Then we meet Gautham, a young businessman, who also suffers from temporary memory problems. His mother gets annoyed with him and asks him to marry a girl, Hema, whom he doesn't like. Angry with his mother, he and his grandmother make a plan. The plan is that he will say that he is in love with another girl, and the next day they are going to have a date.

The next morning he goes for a walk around the city looking for a date. He then meets Nithya and watches her sand art and memory show. They fall in love. Nithya does not write her memories of Gautham in her memory book, as she thinks if they are real soul mates then this magic will happen.

The next day they meet, but Nithya does not recognize Gautham. Then Gautham, his friend Apoorva, and Nithya's sister Neetu make up plans to meet Nithya again, and at last, he succeeds. He tells his mother that he loves Nithya and then brings her to his house. There they realize their love for each Other.

The next day Nithya forgets him but reminds herself about him after reading her memory book. She then says that they can never stay together and hence, tears his memories from her book. They go their separate ways. Later, Gautham is traveling to the US for a meeting, and he meets Neetu at the airport. She says that Nithya is doing well and shows him the video of Nithya's program.

He sees that the pictures drawn are related to him and abandons his trip to watch Nithya's show. When she sees him there, she draws his image. But when he asks her whether she remembers him, she says no. Gautham returns and then sees his mother in the auditorium. His mother asks him to turn back. When he looks at the screen he sees Nithya drawing his face. Gautham runs back to the stage and asks her "whether she really does not know him." She replies that "even without knowing who you are I used to draw your pictures." Then they understand that even though she forgets everything after 24 hours, she will never be able to forget him as she loves him.

They marry and begin their life together.

== Cast ==
- Vineeth Sreenivasan as Gautham, Young businessman
- Namitha Pramod as Nithya/Nithya Gautam, Sand animation artist
- Mukesh as Nithya's Doctor/ Uncle James Kuruvilla
- Aju Varghese as Apoorva, Gautham's best pal
- Soumya Sadanandan as Neethu, Nithya's Sister
- Rohini as Vasundhara Devi, Gautham's mother
- Lakshmi as Gautham's grandmother
- Muktha as Hema
- Idavela Babu as Ashokan, Hema's Father
- Anju Aravind as Latha, Hema's Mother
- Reena Basheer
- Raveendran as Hari, Gautham's Father
- Bhagath Manuel
- Shalini Thomas as Gouri, Gautham's sister

== Production ==
Filming commenced in August 2014 in Kochi and later took place at various locations including Pune, Angamaly and Alappuzha.

== Soundtrack ==
Ormayundo Ee Mukham

Soundtrack album by Shaan Rahman
- Released: 24 October 2014
- Recorded: 2014
- Genre: Feature film soundtrack
- Language: Malayalam
- Label: Muzik 247
- Producer: Shaan Rahman

Shaan Rahman chronology
Saheba Subramanyam (2014)	Ormayundo Ee Mukham (2014)	Aadu Oru Bheegara Jeevi Aanu (2015)

The film's soundtrack was composed by Shaan Rahman, Vineeth Sreenivasan's usual associate. The lyrics of these songs were penned by Manu Manjith (Chayunnuvo, Doore Doore, Payye Payye) and Vineeth Sreenivasan. The album, which was launched in late October 2014 in Kochi, features six tracks including one reprise.

The album was well received by critics and public alike.

No.	Title	Artist(s)	Length
1.	"Aaromale"	Shaan Rahman	3:54
2.	"Chayunnuvo"	Shaan Rahman	4:58
3.	"Doore Doore"	Vineeth Sreenivasan	3:02
4.	"Doore Doore" (Reprise)	Rinu Razak	2:59
5.	"Ee Mizhikalin"	Vineeth Sreenivasan, Mridula Warrier	3:41
6.	"Payye Payye"	K. S. Harisankar	3:47

== Reception ==
The film was released to mixed reviews.

== See also ==
- Mithya
