= Alamara =

- Theatrical release poster
- Directed by: Midhun Manuel Thomas
- Written by: John Manthrickal
- Story by: Mahesh Gopal
- Produced by: Full on Studios
- Starring: Sunny Wayne; Aditi Ravi; Aju Varghese; Saiju Kurup; Manikandan R. Achari
- Cinematography: Satheesh Kurup
- Edited by: Lijo Paul
- Music by: Sooraj S. Kurup
- Production company: Full on Studios
- Release date: 17 March 2017
- Running time: 140 minutes
- Country: India
- Language: Malayalam

Alamara (transl. Cupboard) is a 2017 Indian Malayalam-language comedy film directed by Midhun Manuel Thomas and written by John Manthrickal. The film stars Sunny Wayne, Aditi Ravi, Aju Varghese, Saiju Kurup, Ranji Panicker, and Sonu Anna Jacob in main roles. It has two songs composed by Sooraj S. Kurup, written by Manu Manjith, and sung by Vijay Yesudas and Anju Joseph.

== Plot ==
The story is narrated by the titular wardrobe and explains how it became a metaphor for the issues caused by parents' interference in the life of a newly married couple. Arun is unable to find a girl to marry due to issues in his horoscope. After his betrothed elopes with her lover, he decides to take a break from the arranged marriage scene and concentrates on his work in Bangalore. His sister requests him to find accommodation for her friend, Swati, as she is transferred to Bangalore. However, upon meeting her, he is smitten and asks her hand in marriage which she accepts. Meanwhile, a gang of goons loyal to Shetty demands that Arun sell his plot of land to them.

Though his parents are not happy with Swati's proposal, he convinces them to meet her parents to fix the wedding. However, they put forth a condition that Arun's sister's wedding should also happen along with his but she refuses to get married until she gets a bank job. As the fixed date approaches, tensions between the families rise as there is a lack of enthusiasm from Arun's family's side. During a heated argument, Arun's mother calls off the wedding. However, due to Arun and Swati's persistence, they marry while the families hide their displeasure.

Swati's family gifts the new couple a wooden wardrobe as per the tradition and Arun's mother starts to complain that it is taking up too much space. After moving to Bangalore, Swati nags Arun to bring the wardrobe to their new house and he reluctantly agrees. Both the families begin to interfere in their lives which leads to petty problems between them. Arun's lawyer requests him to submit the documents related to the disputed plot of land but he realises that it is in the wardrobe which is locked by Swati who is in Mumbai for training. Without any other option, he and his friends contact a thief to break the wardrobe's lock and retrieve it. After they are submitted at the police station, the police officer sides with Shetty and argues that the documents are fake. Shetty and his gang encroach the plot but are assaulted and scared off by Arun and friends with the help of some goons arranged by his uncle.

When Swati returns, she notices that the wardrobe lock is broken and her necklace is stolen. She confronts Arun which leads to a huge fight between them. In addition, Shetty threatens to kill them if he doesn't let go of the plot and leave Bangalore which scares Swati. Swati leaves him and moves back to Kerala. They attend a marriage counselling session which isn't successful as their parents don't co-operate. As a result, they get divorced.

Sometime later, they both see other potential partners. Afraid of committing to another woman and meeting the same fate as before, he decides to reconcile with Swati. They restart their married life with their parents' approval but by keeping them at a distance.

== Cast ==
- Sunny Wayne as Arun Pavithran
- Aditi Ravi as Swati
- Aju Varghese as Suvin
- Saiju Kurup as Prasad
- Sudhi Koppa as Justin
- Manikandan R. Achari as Sugunan aka Supran
- Indrans as Sriram Shetty
- Ranji Panicker as Pavithran
- Sadiq as Pankajakshan
- Manju Satheesh as Lalitha
- Seema G. Nair as Sukumari
- Vijilesh Karayad as Photographer
- Sonu Anna Jacob as Divya
- Bijukuttan as burglar
- Kunchan as Vasu
- Preetha Pradeep as Prasad's wife
- Saleem Kumar (voice only) as the soul of the wooden wardrobe (Alamara)
- Lishoy
