= M. B. Padmakumar =

Indian actor, television personality and filmmaker

M.B.Padmakumar
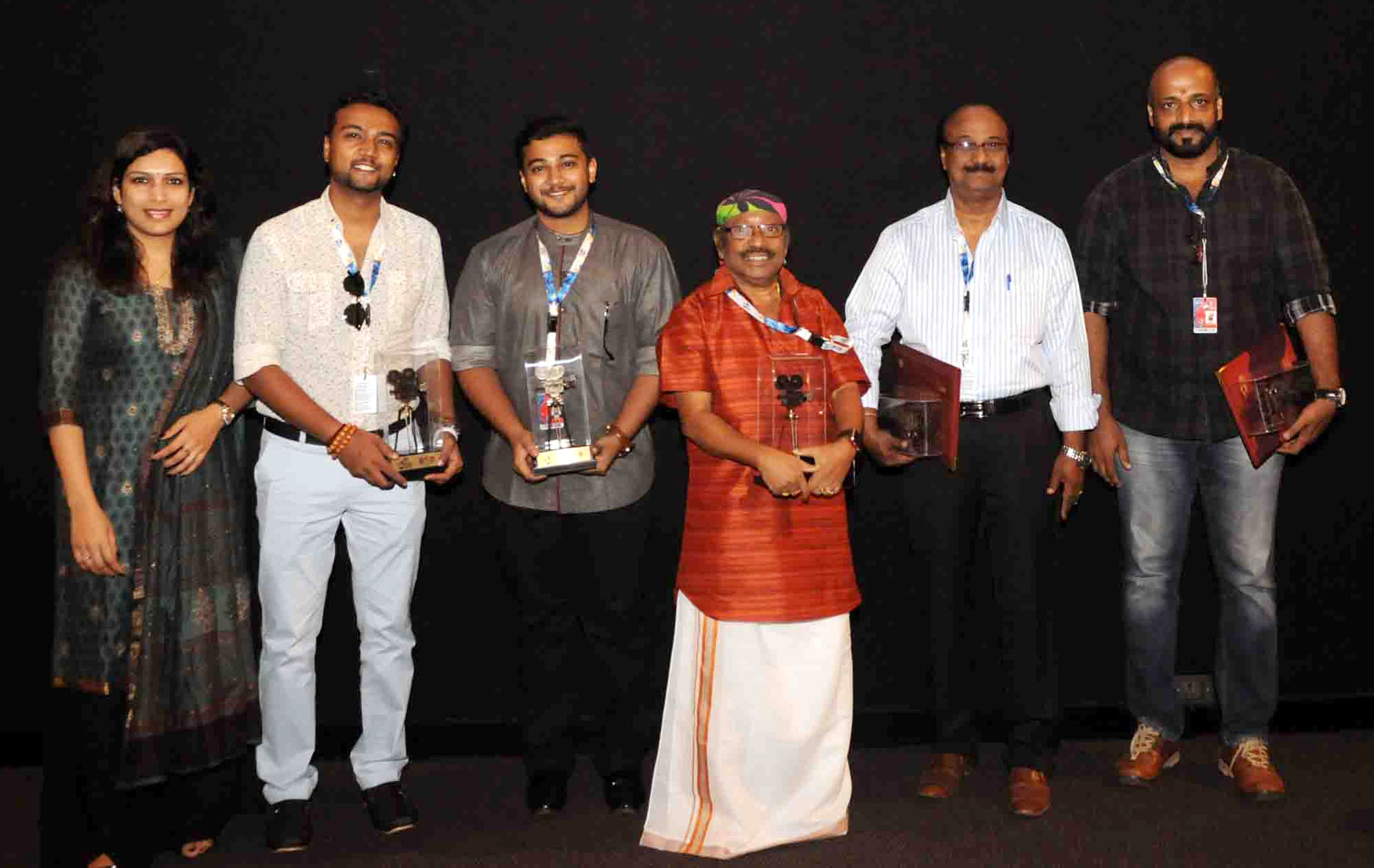
- M. B. Padmakumar, IFFI (2016)
- Born: Madavana Bhaskarannair Padmakumar; Thiruvalla, Kerala, India
- Occupations: Actor, writer, editor, director
- Years active: 2005 - present
- Awards: Kerala State Film Award; Mohan Raghavan Puraskaram; Indian Panorama Selection

Madavana Bhaskarannair Padmakumar is an Indian actor, television personality and filmmaker from Kerala.

== Career ==
As an actor, he performed in a number of movies starting with Ashwaroodan (2006) and more than 15 television serials in Malayalam. His directorial debut was the 2014 film My Life Partner, which investigated the close relationship between two men and caused some controversy, followed by 2015's Roopantharam, 2017's Telescope,

The release date of My Life Partner was delayed by a month because of its content, Kerala lacking "a socio-cultural space for LGBTs"; theater owners kept saying there were no screens available; in the end it was shown only in four small theaters and received a poor showing. To Padmakumar's surprise, it finished second best in the 45th Kerala State Film Awards, and also won for Best Lead Actor. Best Sound Mix, Best Background Score

== Filmography ==
=== Director, producer, actor, writer and editor ===
Year	Title	Role	Actor	Director	Writer	Editor	Producer	Awards
2025	Token Number			Yes	Yes	Yes	Yes	
2017	Telescope			Yes	Yes	Yes	Yes	
2015	Roopantharam			Yes	Yes	Yes		Selected for 47th IFFI 2016 Indian Panorama.; Best Feature Film, All Lights India International Film Festival.; Cannes Film festival
2014	My Life Partner			Yes	Yes			Won 45th Kerala State Film Awards for; Best Second Movie; Best Actor; Best Background Score; Best Sound Mix; Mohan Raghava Puraskaram for Best Screenplay.
2013	Thomson Villa	"Paul"	Yes					
2012	72 Model	"Vijayan"	Yes					
2010	Kutty Srank	"Neelan"	Yes					
2009	Ee Pattanathil Bhootham	"Teja"	Yes					
2009	Keralotsavam 2009	"Arshad Kamal"	Yes					
2009	Daveed	"Daveed"	Yes					
2007	Thaniye	"Dr.Rajan"	Yes					
2007	Nivedyam (2007 film)	"Surendran"	Yes					
2006	Rakshakan	"Vijayan"	Yes					
2005	Ashwaroodan	"Padmapriya's Brother"	Yes					

== Television ==
Year	Serial	Channel	Notes
2010	Kunjalimarakkar	Asianet	Debut
2010-2011	Maharani (TV series)	Vijay TV	Tamil serial
2011	Vrindavanam	Asianet	
2012	Agniputhri	Asianet	
2012	Sree Padmanabham	Amrita TV	
2013	Highway	Surya TV	
2013	Indira	Mazhavil Manorama	
2014	Amala (TV series)	Mazhavil Manorama	
2014-2015	Balamani	Mazhavil Manorama	
2015	Vishwaroopam	Flowers TV	
2015	7 Rathrikal	Asianet	
2015	Sreekrishna Vijayam	Janam TV	
2016	Sathyam Shivam Sundaram	Amrita TV	
2016	Ennu Swantham Jani	Surya TV	
2018	Thenum Vayambum	Surya TV	
2020	Koodathayi	Flowers TV	
2021–2022	Kana Kanmani	Surya TV	
2024–present	Chandrikayilaliyunna Chandrakantham	Asianet	
