= Aditi Ravi =

Indian actress

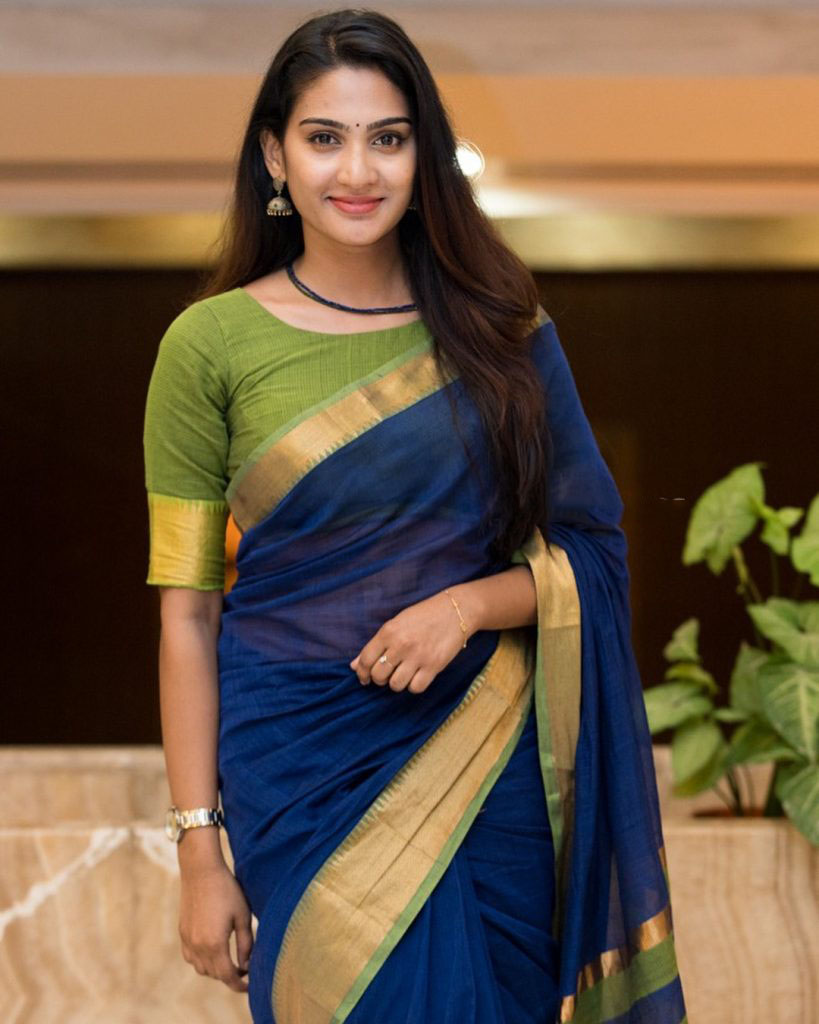
- Born: Thrissur, Kerala, India
- Education: University of Calicut
- Occupations: Actress; model
- Years active: 2014–present

Aditi Ravi is an Indian model and actress, who appears in Malayalam films. She pursued a career in modelling before becoming an actress, debuting with a commercial for The Times of India during her college education. She made her acting debut with the 2014 film Angry Babies in Love, in a supporting role. Her first female lead role was in the 2017 film Alamara.

== Early life ==
Aditi was born in Thrissur, Kerala, as the daughter of Ravi and Geetha. She has two siblings named Rakesh and Rakhi. She studied at the Little Flower Convent School in Irinjalakuda and then graduated with a degree from Christ College, Irinjalakuda. She currently resides in Kochi.

== Career ==
She began her modelling career during her college education, she was selected after applying for appearing in a commercial for The Times of India. Later she acted in a number of commercials for various brands. She debuted as an actress in 2014, in a supporting role in the Malayalam romantic-drama film Angry Babies in Love, directed by Saji Surendran. She played the role, Maria, a model coordinator in a modelling agency. Before the film released, she was cast in two more films, Third World Boys and Beware of Dogs in the same year. She played Teena in Beware of Dogs. In 2014, she also appeared in the music video, Yelove, alongside Siddharth Menon, she was voiced by Shreya Ghoshal. She appeared in her first female lead role in 2017 with the film Alamara, opposite Sunny Wayne. She was selected after auditioning for the role. The film directed by Midhun Manuel Thomas was a satirical comedy surrounding around the custom of gifting a cupboard as part of dowry in Kerala weddings. Some other films are Aadhi, directed by Jeethu Joseph, and Tick Tock.

== Filmography ==
=== Films ===
Key
†	Denotes films that have not yet been released

Year	Title	Role	Notes	Ref.
2014	Angry Babies in Love	Maria		
2014	Beware of Dogs	Teena		
2015	Kohinoor	Freddy's Lover		
2015	Idhu Enna Maayam	Nithya	Tamil film	
2017	Alamara	Swathi		
2017	Adventures of Omanakuttan	Honey		
2017	Udaharanam Sujatha	Athira Krishnan IAS	Cameo appearance	
2017	Lavakusha	Minnah		
2017	Chembarathipoo	Diya		
2018	Aadhi	Anjana		
2018	Kuttanadan Marpappa	Dr. Jessy		
2018	Naam	Neha John		
2021	The Last Two Days	Merlin		
2022	Pathaam Valavu	Seetha		
2022	12th Man	Aarathy		
2022	Kuri	Manjima		
2022	Peace	Renuka		
2023	Christopher	Ashwini Trimurthi		
2023	Neru	Nikhila Jayachandran		
2024	Big Ben	Lovely		
2024	Hunt	Dr. Sara Eppan		
2025	Khajuraho Dreams	Lola Mammen Mathew		
2026	Baby Girl	Sini		

=== Music albums ===
Year	Title	Cast	Director
2014	Yelove	Siddharth Menon	Ajit Mathew
2015	Yami	Siddharth Menon	Ajit Mathew

=== Short films ===
Year	Title	Role	Director	Notes	Ref.
2014	Ellam Theppu	Suhra	Hakkim		
2021	Ente Narayanikku	Ann / Narayani	Varsha		
2021	Insta Gramam		Mridul Nair	Web series	

== Awards and nominations ==
Year	Award	Category	Film	Result
2019	21st Asianet Film Awards	Best Character Actress	Kuttanadan Marpappa	Nominated
