= Ennaalum Sarath..? =

- Theatrical release poster
- Directed by: Balachandra Menon
- Screenplay by: Balachandra Menon
- Produced by: R. Harikumar
- Starring: Balachandra Menon; Charlie Joe; Nitya Naresh; Parvathy Arun
- Cinematography: Anish Lal
- Edited by: Ratheesh Raj
- Music by: Ouseppachan
- Production company: Krishna Kala Creations
- Distributed by: Safe Cinemaas
- Release date: 27 July 2018
- Country: India
- Language: Malayalam

Ennaalum Sarath..? is a 2018 Indian Malayalam-language suspense drama film written and directed by Balachandra Menon and starring himself along with debutants Charlie Joe, Nitya Naresh, and Parvathy Arun. The film was released on 27 July 2018.

== Cast ==
- Balachandra Menon as Dr. Sam
- Charlie Joe as Sarath
- Parvathy Arun as Elizabeth (Liz)
- Nitya Naresh as Micky
- Akhil Vinayak as Navas Sherif
- Mallika Sukumaran as Dr. Sams mother
- Viji Thampi as Principal
- Lal Jose as Peter
- Major Ravi as John (S.P)
- Jude Anthany Joseph as Sreekanth (I.P.S)
- A. K. Sajan as Fr.Joy
- Joy Mathew as Violin Teacher
- Dileesh Pothan as Doctor
- Sidharth Siva as Salam Parapanangady (Director)
- Joshy Mathew as Fr. Thottathil
- Mareena Michael Kurisingal as Malavika Sreekanth
- Surabhi Lakshmi as Abhishtta Lekshmi (DYSP)
- Ponnamma Babu as Sarath's Mother
- Kunchan (actor) as Sarath's father
- Kottayam Nazeer as Policeman
- Noby as Dharman
- Joby as Shop Assistant
- Poojapura Radhakrishnan as Politician
- Karyavatom Sasikumar as an MLA
- Mary as a Shop Helper
- Deepika Mohan as Hostel Matron
- Reena as Mother Superior
- Lakshmi Priya as Lady Police officer
- Devi Ajith as Navas Sherif's mother
- Meenakshi Mahesh as heroines young age
- Anoop Krishnan as Sub Inspector Ravi
- Leona Lishoy as Haseeba - in Photograph stills

== Production ==
The film features 40 newcomers in lead and supporting roles. Apart from actors, nine film directors portrays other characters—Lal Jose, Major Ravi, Sidhartha Siva, Viji Thampi, Jude Anthany Joseph, A. K. Sajan, Joy Mathew, Joshy Mathew, and Dileesh Pothan. Menon introduced his son Akhil Vinayak in a cameo role in the film.

== Soundtrack ==
The soundtrack consists two songs composed by Ouseppachan. The first music video of the song "Sasiyane" was released by Nivin Pauly on his Facebook page. The video was released on the YouTube channel of the label Muzik 247 on 22 June 2018.

Track listing
No.	Title	Writer(s)	Singer(s)	Length
1.	"Sasiyane"	Hari Narayanan	Neeraj Suresh, Rimi Tomy	4:41
2.	"Thullimazha Vellam"	Rafeeq Ahamed	Shweta Mohan, Chorus	4:12

== Release ==
Ennaalum Sarath..? released in Kerala on 27 July 2018.
