= Cheraathukal =

- Release poster
- Directed by: Shanoob Karuvath; Sreejith Chandran; Anu Kurisinkal; Jayesh Mohan; Shajan S Kallai; Fawaz Mohamed
- Written by: Shanoob Karuvath; Sreejith Chandran; Jebin James; Jayesh Mohan; C. V. Balakrishnan; Sarath Sasi
- Produced by: Dr. Mathew Mampra
- Starring: Mareena Michael Kurisinkal; Manohari Joy; Maala Parvathy; Adil Ibrahim; Parvathy Arun; Shivaji Guruvayoor; Dr. Mathew Mampra
- Cinematography: Josekutty Jose; Nijay Jayan; Adarsh Pramod; Clisun Cleetus; Ashok Vishnu; Samir Haider; Gowtham Babu
- Release date: 17 June 2021
- Running time: 143 minutes
- Country: India
- Language: Malayalam

Cheraathukal (transl. Clay Lamps) is a 2021 Indian Malayalam-language anthology film, which has six stories, each painting different shades of love. The film is released on 17 June 2021 on 7 OTT platforms: Nee Stream, Saina Play, First Shows, High Hopes (HH), Zinea, Cave, FilMe, Koode, Roots Video and Limelight. The film was shot during the pandemic with around 100 technicians while following all COVID-19 protocols. The film re-released on Manorama MAX OTT on 12-May 2026 with an alternate title 'Kanavu Kadhakal'.

== Plot ==
There are six short films in this movie, each painting different shades of love. Love is like an ocean and its vastness is what this movie tries to capture.

=== Veyil Veezhave ===
The story depicts the bond between a caring bubbly young home nurse and the senior citizen whom she came to take care.

=== Narthaki ===
This is the story of a dancer following her deep love towards her passion and finding that with the help of her love.

=== Diwa ===
The Story starts with the development of a relationship and progressing to the escape of the female character from the clutches of evil when she trusted her instincts

=== Clara ===
This is a tale of an everlasting love that prompts one to wait his entire life for his love.

=== Puzha ===
A nun's love for the underprivileged and the marginalized and the cost she pays when the decision of a kind act delays.

=== Saamoohya Paadam ===
This is a story of a youngster and his love for his own people and his urge to do something for them.

== List of short films ==
Title	Director	Writer	Cinematographer	Music
Veyil Veezhave	Shanoob Karuvath	Shanoob Karuvath	Josekutty Jose	Nithin George
Narthaki	Sreejith Chandran	Sreejith Chandran	Nijay Jayan	Pratik Abyankar
Diwa	Anu Kurisinkal	Jebin James	Adarsh Pramod	Mejo Joseph
Clara	Jayesh Mohan	Jayesh Mohan	Clisun Cleetus; Ashok Vishnu	Aromal E.M; Elvin James
Puzha	Shajan S Kallai	C. V. Balakrishnan	Samir Haider	Pratik Abhyankar
Saamoohya Paadam	Fawaz Mohamed	Sarath Sasi	Gowtham Babu	Rohit Gopalakrishnan

== Cast ==
=== Veyil Veezhave ===
- Mareena Michael Kurisingal
- Dr. Mathew Mampra

=== Narthaki ===
- Shivaji Guruvayoor
- Devika Rajendra
- Anoop Mohandas
- I. V. Junice

=== Diwa ===
- Sandeep Ramesh
- Sneha C. Thomas
- Surendran Kaliyath

=== Clara ===
- Manohari Joy
- Maria Prince
- Aswin Jose
- Saheer Muhammed

=== Puzha ===
- Maala Parvathi
- Swathy Puthenveettil
- Dr. Aparna Soman

=== Samoohya Paadam ===
- Adil Ibrahim
- Babu Annur
- Anand Radhakrishnan
- Parvathy Arun
- Dr. Shinu Shyamalan
- Laila Oravackal
- Suphy Maria

== Music ==
The sound design of the movie is done by Shefin Mayan. This movie has 3 songs.

Track listing
No.	Title	Lyrics	Singer(s)	Length
1.	"Irul Moodumee, Pakalukal"	Dr. Mathew Mampra	Kavalam Srikumar, Thaha Kolpad	4:03
2.	"Ethetho Maunangal"	Anu Kurisinkal	Vidhu Prathap & Nithya Mammen	4:00
3.	"Padi Padiyaay"	Dr. Mathew Mampra	Ishaan Dev	4:00
Total length:				12:03
