= Angry Babies in Love =

- Directed by: Saji Surendran
- Written by: Krishna Poojappura
- Produced by: Darshan Ravi
- Starring: Anoop Menon; Bhavana
- Cinematography: Anil Nair
- Edited by: Manoj
- Music by: Bijibal
- Production company: Dimac Creations
- Distributed by: LJ Films; Popcorn Entertainments Australia
- Release date: 14 June 2014
- Country: India
- Language: Malayalam

Angry Babies in Love is a 2014 Malayalam romantic comedy film directed by Saji Surendran and scripted by Krishna Poojappura. It stars Anoop Menon and Bhavana. The film, produced by Darshan Ravi under the banner of Demac Creations, has music composed by Bijibal and cinematography by Anil Nair. It was released on 14 June 2014 and received mixed reviews from critics. The music label for the movie is Muzik247

== Plot ==
Jeevan Paul is a still photographer who runs a studio in a village in Idukki. By accident, he meets Sarah Thomas, a girl from a good family, and they fall in love. The plot starts when Sarah is at church, about to marry a man who was chosen by her parents. Jeevan, who is one of the photographers, steps up and claims that Sarah loves him and this marriage shouldn't happen. Sarah's family oppose her relationship with Jeevan. So they elope and move away, settling in Mumbai. A year later they appear in court seeking a divorce. The court orders them to stay together for another six months.

== Cast ==
- Anoop Menon as Jeevan Paul
- Bhavana as Sarah Thomas
- Anusree as Selvi
- Arun as Deepak
- Nishanth Sagar as Anwar
- Parvathy Nair as Paro
- P. Balachandran as Madhavan
- Noby Marcose as Kochu Kunju
- Joju George as Alex Maliyekkal
- Muktha
- Aditi Ravi as Maria
- Romanch as Salman
- Kalabhavan Shaju as Sreedhar

== Reception ==
The Times of India gave the film 3 stars out of 5 and wrote, "The film will certainly come across as a pleasant watch for families who would enjoy certain situations in the film, but as a mass entertainer, it might fall a bit short". Nowrunning.com gave 2 stars out of 5 and wrote, "Playing out on the trouble that brews in a marital paradise, Angry Babies sings a familiar tune, is sporadically funny and makes little attempts whatsoever to take a detour from a much beaten path".

== Soundtrack ==
The film's soundtrack contains four songs, all composed by Bijibal. The lyrics were written by Anoop Menon and Rajeev Alunkal.

#	Title	Singer(s)
1	"Eden Thottam (Maaya Theeram)"	Nikhil Mathew, Rimi Tomy
2	"Ivar Anuraagikal"	Bijibal
3	"Mele Chelode"	Vijay Yesudas
4	"Zindagi"	Soumya Ramakrishnan
