= Sana Althaf =

Indian actress

- Born: Kochi, Kerala, India
- Occupations: Film actress; TV host
- Years active: 2013–2019
- Spouse: Hakim Shahjahan (m. 2024)
- Relatives: Sajna Najam (aunt)

Sana Althaf is an Indian actress who works in Malayalam and Tamil films.

== Career ==
She was born in Kochi, Kerala to Althaf and Shameena Althaf. She attended Bhavan's Adarsha Vidyalaya in Kochi. She was a TV host before starting an acting career. She made her movie debut playing Dulquer Salman's sister in Vikramadithyan. She got the role through her aunt Sajna Najam. She then played the female lead, Salomi in Mariyam Mukku, opposite Fahadh Faazil and was also seen as a trekker in Rani Padmini. She made her Tamil debut through Chennai 600028 II: Second Innings playing Anuradha. She then acted alongside Farhan Faazil in Basheerinte Premalekhanam as Suhra. She was then seen in Odiyan where she played Meenakshi, sister of Manju Warrier. She was then seen in Tamil movies RK Nagar and Pancharaksharam.

== Filmography ==
Key
†	Denotes films that have not yet been released

Year	Title	Role	Language	Ref.
2014	Vikramadithyan	Shruthi	Malayalam	
2015	Mariyam Mukku	Salomi	Malayalam	
2015	Rani Padmini	Trekker	Malayalam	
2016	Chennai 600028 II	Anuradha	Tamil	
2017	Basheerinte Premalekhanam	Suhra	Malayalam	
2018	Odiyan	Meenakshi	Malayalam	
2019	RK Nagar	Ranjini	Tamil	
2019	Pancharaaksharam	Jeevika	Tamil	
2026	I, Nobody	Nisha	Malayalam	
