= Sudev Nair =

Indian actor and model

- Born: 14 April 1985 (age 41); Mumbai, Maharashtra, India
- Occupations: Actor; filmmaker; model
- Years active: 2014–present

Sudev Nair (born 14 April 1985) is an Indian actor and model who predominantly works in Malayalam and Telugu films. He is best known for his performance in My Life Partner (2014), for which he was awarded the Kerala State Film Award for Best Actor in 2014. He starred in the 2019 Hindi film India's Most Wanted, in the title role opposite Arjun Kapoor.

His other notable works include Gulaab Gang (2014) and Anarkali (2015) and Karinkunnam 6's (2016), the latter being his Hindi film debut. He debuted in Telugu cinema with Tiger Nageswara Rao (2023) and as the main antagonist in Extra Ordinary Man (2023).

Nair is an alumnus of Film and Television Institute of India, Pune.

== Early life ==
Despite being placed in the campus placements after Bachelors in Engineering, Nair's passion for cinema drove him towards his post-graduation training at the Pune Film Institute. His film-making career began with various short films in different genres, which were included in competitions and festivals at national and international levels. His short ad for Mountain Dew soft drink was shortlisted to the finals at the MOFILM Barcelona Ad Film Fest in 2010.

== Career ==
Nair's acting career began with the Hindi film Gulaab Gang (2014), directed by Soumik Sen. Set with a plot on the struggle of Indian Women, the film had an ensemble star cast including Madhuri Dixit and Juhi Chawla. It was praised by critics, garnering a positive response for the actors' performances.

Nair then starred in M. B. Padmakumar's debut, My Life Partner, which dealt with the emotional relationship between two men. The movie became garnered controversy and faced issues with its release. Nair played the role of Kiran, for which he won the Kerala State Film Award for Best Actor in 2014.

He then appeared in Anarkali (2015).

In 2023 he appeared in the lead role of The Jengaburu Curse.

== Awards and recognition ==
- Kerala State Film Award for Best Actor – My Life Partner
- Malanadu TV Best Actor in a Negative Role – Bheeshma Parvam

== Filmography ==
=== Films ===
Key
†	Denotes films that have not yet been released

Year	Title	Role	Language	Notes
2014	Million Dollar Arm	News Anchor	English	
2014	Gulaab Gang	Arjun Shankar	Hindi	
2014	My Life Partner	Kiran	Malayalam	
2015	Anarkali	Naseeb Imam	Malayalam	
2016	Karinkunnam 6's	Ekru	Malayalam	
2016	Campus Diary	Nikhil	Malayalam	
2017	Ezra	Abraham Ezra	Malayalam	
2018	Angarajyathe Jimmanmar	William	Malayalam	
2018	Call	Call Taxi Driver	Malayalam	Short film
2018	Men at my Door	Jerry	Malayalam	Short film
2018	Abrahaminte Santhathikal	Bro. Simon	Malayalam	
2018	Kayamkulam Kochunni	Swathi Thirunal Rama Varma	Malayalam	
2019	Mikhael	Francis Davi	Malayalam	
2019	Athiran	Jeevan Thomas	Malayalam	
2019	India's Most Wanted	Yusuf	Hindi	
2019	Thakkol	Silvester	Malayalam	
2019	Mamangam	Rarichan	Malayalam	
2019	Thrissur Pooram	Sudheep Rangan	Malayalam	
2021	One	MP Dinesh Rajan	Malayalam	
2022	Old Monk	Shashank Radhakrishna	Kannada	
2022	Bheeshma Parvam	Rajan Madhavan Nair	Malayalam	
2022	CBI 5: The Brain	S.I Iqbal	Malayalam	
2022	Twenty One Hours	Renjith Menon	Kannada	
2022	Pathonpatham Noottandu	Padaveedan Nambi	Malayalam	
2022	Heaven	DySP Bijoy Kuruvilla	Malayalam	
2022	Kotthu	C.I.Indrajith	Malayalam	
2022	Monster	Anil Chandra	Malayalam	
2022	Khedda	Sarath	Malayalam	
2022	Vazhakku		Malayalam	
2023	Thuramukham	Pacheek	Malayalam	
2023	Tiger Nageswara Rao	Kasi	Telugu	
2023	Extra Ordinary Man	Nero	Telugu	
2024	Thankamani	Roy	Malayalam	
2024	Devara: Part 1	Samara	Telugu	
2025	They Call Him OG	Jimmy Vardhaman Mirajkar	Telugu	
2025	Freedom	Chief Officer	Tamil	
2026	Mana Shankara Vara Prasad Garu	Virendra Panda	Telugu	
2026	Toxic	Karmadi	Kannada English	Bilingual film
2026	Udumbanchola Vision		Malayalam	

=== Television ===
Year	Title	Role	Network	Language	Notes
2023	The Jengaburu Curse	Dhruv Kanan	SonyLIV	Hindi	
2025	Kammattam	Antonio George	ZEE5	Malayalam	
2026	Muthu Engira Kattaan	Johnny	JioHotstar	Tamil	
