= Parvathy Arun =

Indian actress (born 1981)

- Born: Thiruvananthapuram, Kerala, India
- Other names: Nidhi Arun
- Occupation: Actress
- Years active: 2017–present

Parvathy Arun also known by her stage name Nidhi Arun is an Indian actress who works on Malayalam, Tamil, Telugu and Kannada films.

== Career ==
She was born at Trivandrum, Kerala to Arun and Manju. She did her schooling at Shantiniketan School . She made her movie debut as parallel female lead through Chembarathipoo (2017). She played the female lead in her second movie, Ennaalum Sarath..? (2018). She played one of the three important female characters in her Kannada debut through Geetha (2019). She then went on to play the female lead in Mouname Ishtam which marked her Telugu debut. She returned to Malayalam through the lead role in Kalikkoottukaar and Irupathiyonnaam Noottaandu. She is set to make her Tamil debut as the heroine in Memories opposite Vetri. Another unreleased movie of her is Kannada movie Lankasura.

== Filmography ==
Key
†	Denotes film or TV productions that have not yet been released

Year	Film	Role	Language	Notes	Ref.
2017	Chembarathipoo	Neena Jacob	Malayalam	Malayalam debut	
2018	Ennaalum Sarath..?	Elizabeth	Malayalam		
2019	Geetha	Geethanjali	Kannada	Kannada Debut	
2019	Mouname Ishtam		Telugu	Telugu debut	
2019	Kalikkoottukaar	Anjali	Malayalam		
2019	Irupathiyonnaam Noottaandu	Merin	Malayalam		
2020	Cheraathukal	Treesa	Malayalam	Segment : Saamoohya Paadam	
2022	Kaari	Meena	Tamil	Tamil debut	
2023	Memories		Tamil		
2024	Njan Kandatha Sare		Malayalam		
TBA	Lankasura †		Kannada		
