= My Life Partner =

- Promotional poster of the Movie
- Directed by: M. B. Padmakumar
- Written by: M. B. Padmakumar
- Produced by: Rejimon
- Starring: Sudev Nair; Ameer Niyas; Anusree Nair
- Cinematography: S Balasubramanian
- Music by: Bijibal
- Production company: Kirthana Movies
- Release date: 6 June 2014 (India)
- Running time: 118 minutes
- Country: India
- Language: Malayalam

My Life Partner is a 2014 Indian Malayalam-language drama film written and directed by M. B. Padmakumar. It stars Sudev Nair, Ameer Niyas and Anusree Nair in the lead roles and features Sukanya, Geetha Vijayan and Valsala Menon in supporting roles. The film was produced by Rejimon for Kirthana Movies. The story deals with the deep and intricate emotional relationship between two men, Kiran (Sudev Nair) and Richard (Ameer Niyas), shedding light on mental attachment and emotional caring, rather than the sexual relationship.

The film won the 2014 Kerala State Film Awards for Second best film and Best actor for Sudev Nair.

== Synopsis ==
The film starts with a flashback in which Richard and Pavithra are getting married in a church. It is revealed that Pavithra was an orphan living in an orphanage associated with the Roman Catholic Church. In the present, Richard is seeing Dr. Leela Iyyer for marital problems. He tells Dr. Iyyer that he cannot have a physical relationship with his wife, Pavithra. Upon hearing this, Dr. Iyyer asks Richard to tell her exactly what happened after his marriage.

After their wedding, Richard goes to his apartment in the city with his new wife. He doesn't show any interest in her. One day, Pavithra asks Richard to take her to a church. When they get back from the church, Kiran is waiting for them in the apartment. Richard is uncomfortable seeing Kiran in his apartment. In a series of flashbacks, it is revealed that Richard and Kiran met in college and Richard was able to help Kiran get his life together after he turned to drugs for his problems. They both come from well off, but troubled families. Kiran and Richard form an intricate emotional and physical bond which ends in them living together. One day, Kiran presents the idea of adopting a child to strengthen their bond. Kiran asks Richard, who is bisexual, to marry a woman and abandon her after she bears his child. The woman ends up being Pavithra. Pavithra eventually finds out about Kiran and Richard's relationship after she walks in on them having sex. The trouble Richard goes through to not hurt Pavithra or lose Kiran forms the rest of the film.

== Cast ==
- Sudev Nair as Kiran
- Ameer Niyas as Richard, Kiran's love interest
- Anusree as Pavithra, Richard's wife
- Sukanya as Dr. Leela Iyyer
- Geetha Vijayan
- Valsala Menon

== See also ==
- Sudev Nair
- 2014 Kerala State Film Awards
