= Midhun Manuel Thomas =

Indian film director and screenwriter

- Born: Sulthan Bathery, Wayanad district, Kerala, India
- Occupations: Director; Screenwriter
- Years active: 2014–present
- Spouse: Fibi Kochupurackal (m. 2017)
- Children: 1

Midhun Manuel Thomas is an Indian film director and screenwriter who works in the Malayalam film industry.

== Personal life ==
Midhun married Fibi Kochupurackal on 1 May 2017 at St. Sebastian's Church in Paralikkunnu. The couple have a son born in 2020.

== Career ==
Thomas began his career in the Malayalam film industry in 2014 as the scriptwriter of the film Ohm Shanthi Oshaana, directed by Jude Anthany, starring Nivin Pauly and Nazriya Nazim. His directorial debut movie was 2015's Aadu, starring Jayasurya, Vijay Babu and Sunny Wayne. Later he directed Annmariya Kalippilaanu (2016), Alamara (2017), Aadu 2 (2017) and Argentina Fans Kaattoorkadavu (2019). In 2020, he directed Anjaam Pathiraa.

== Filmography ==
Key
†	Denotes films that have not yet been released

=== As director ===
Year	Title	Notes
2015	Aadu	Debut film
2016	Ann Maria Kalippilaanu	
2017	Alamara	
2017	Aadu 2	
2019	Argentina Fans Kaattoorkadavu	
2020	Anjaam Pathiraa	
2024	Abraham Ozler	
2026	Aadu 3: One Last Ride - Part 1	
TBA	Aadu 3: Part 02 - The Ride Ends †	

=== As screenwriter ===
Year	Title	Director	Notes
2014	Ohm Shanthi Oshaana	Jude Anthany Joseph	Debut film
2023	Garudan	Arun Varma	
2023	Phoenix	Vishnu Bharathan	
2024	Turbo	Vysakh	

=== Web series ===
Key
†	Denotes television productions that have not yet been released

List of web series credits
Year	Title	Creator	Director	Platform	Notes
2026	Anali †	Yes	Yes	JioHotstar	
