= Paralikkunnu =

- Village
- Country: India
- State: Kerala
- District: Wayanad

Languages
  - Official: Malayalam, English
- Time zone: UTC+5:30 (IST)
- ISO 3166 code: IN-KL
- Vehicle registration: KL-
- Coastline: 0 kilometres (0 mi)

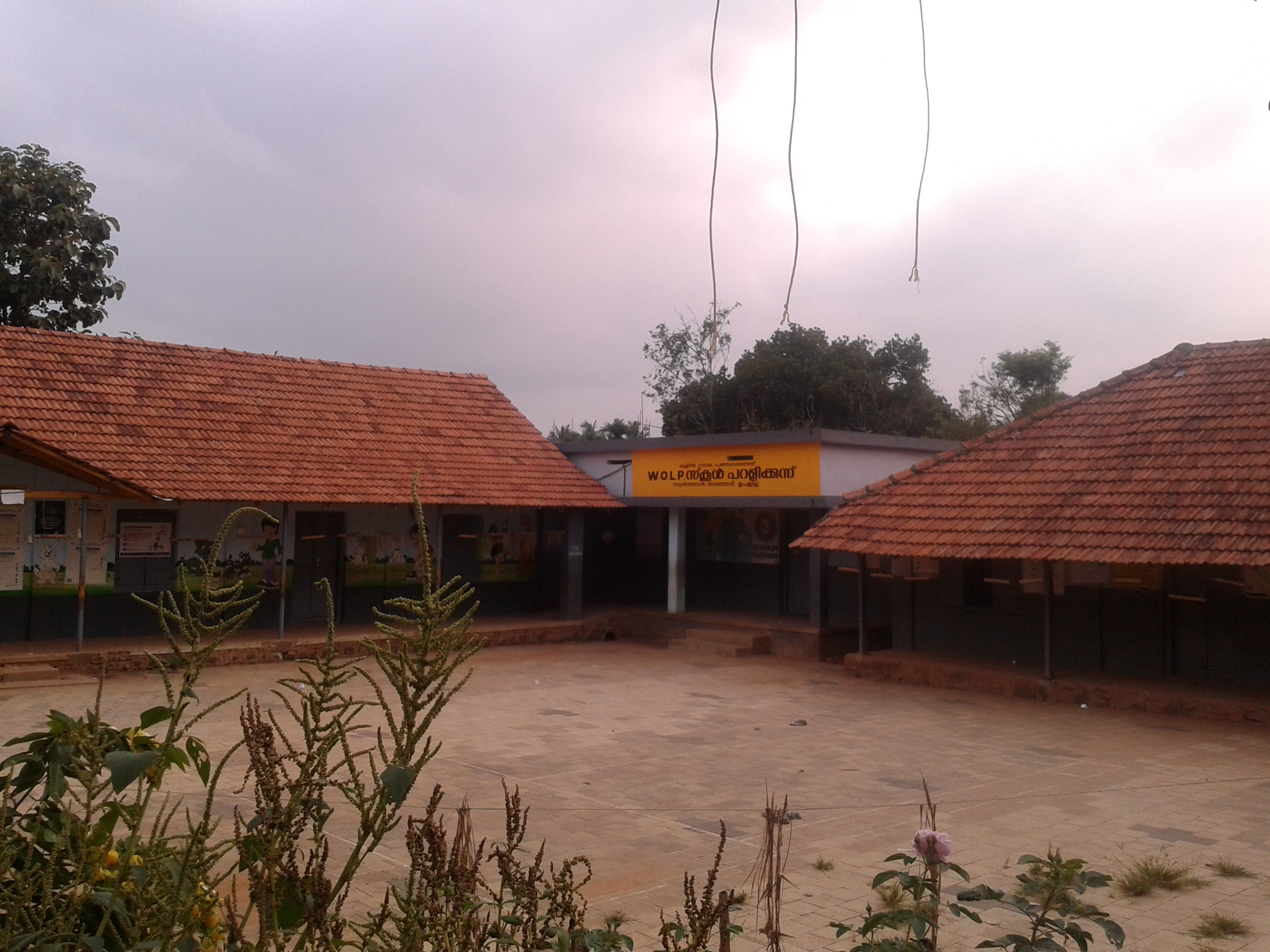
WOLP School Paralikkunnu

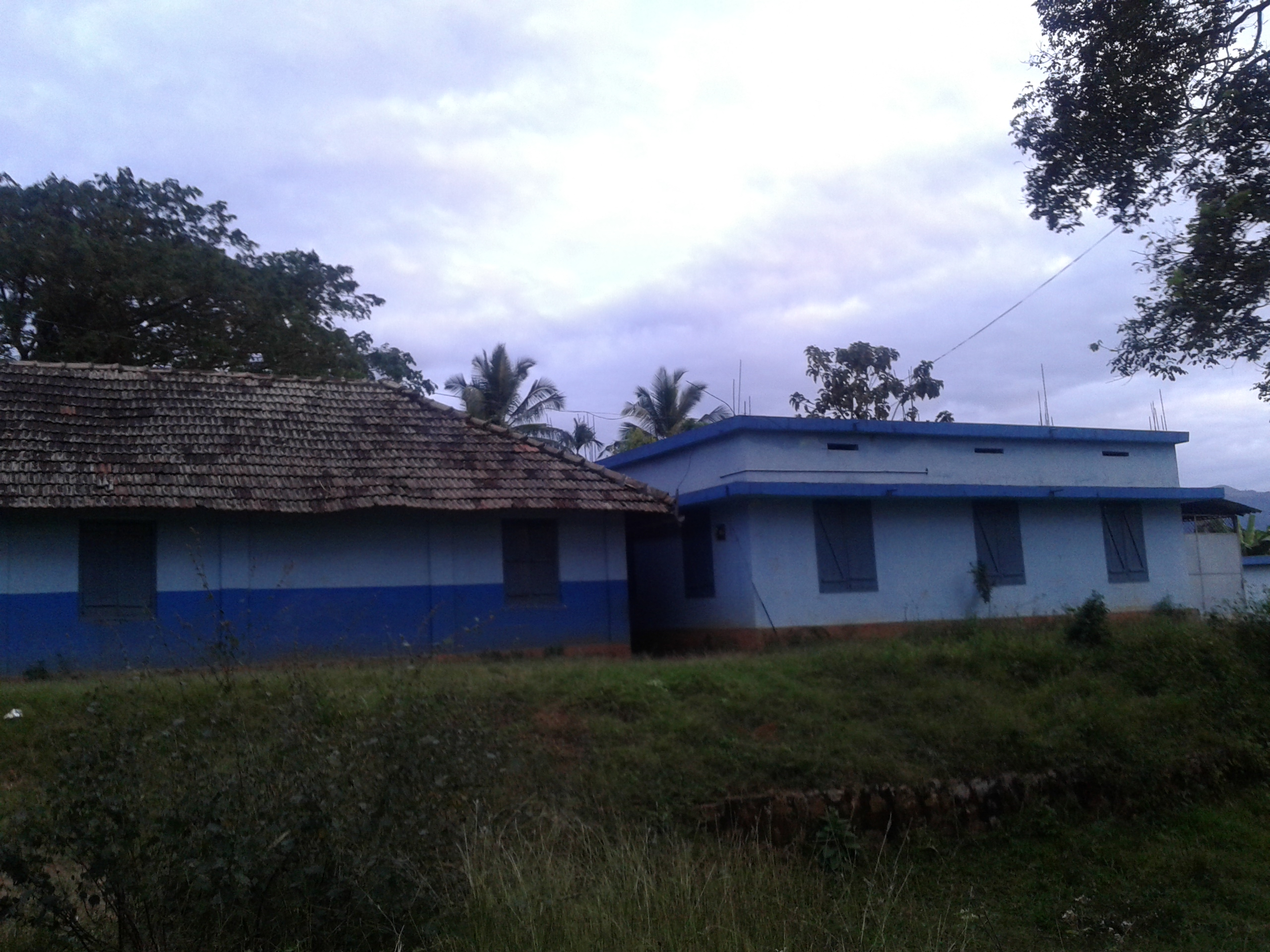
WOLP School Paralikkunnu

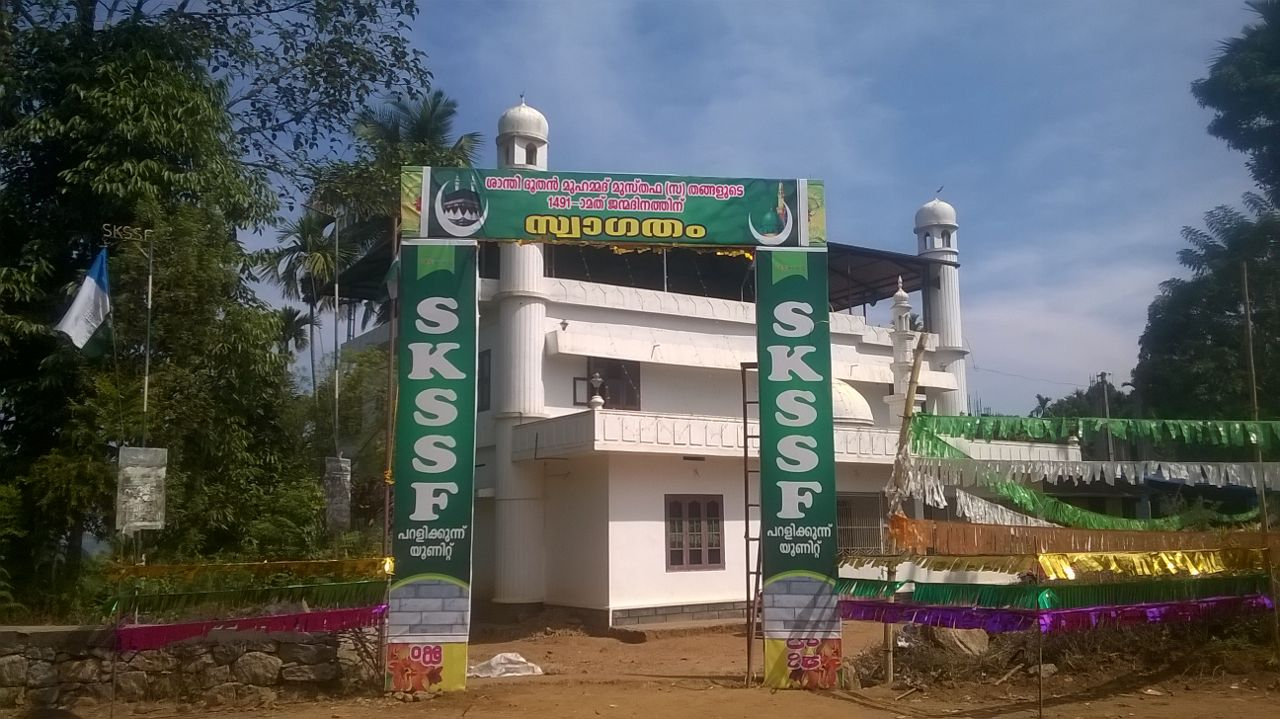
Paralikkunnu Juma Masjid in 2015

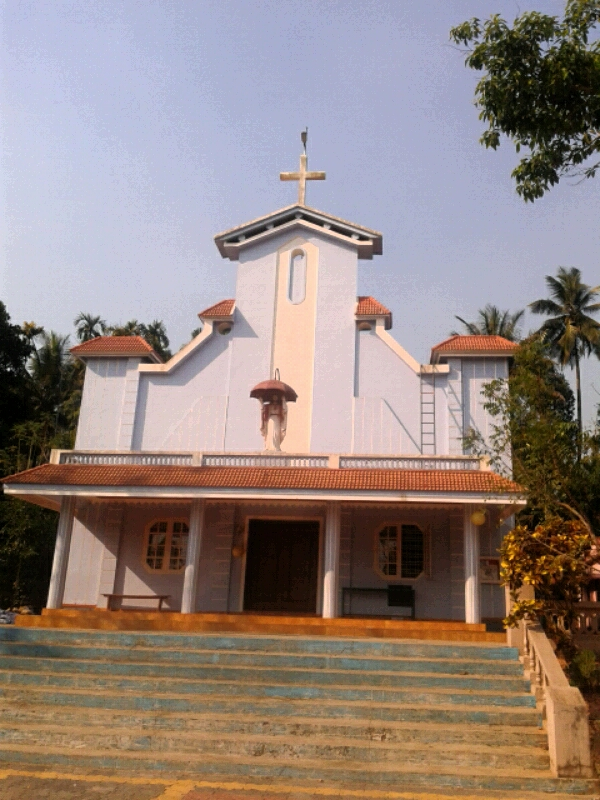
St. Sebastian Church Paralikkunnu

Paralikkunnu is a small village near Kambalakkad in Kaniyambetta and Muttil Panchayath, Wayanad district, Kerala, India.
