= Argentina Fans Kaattoorkadavu =

2019 Indian Malayalam film

- Theatrical Release Poster
- Directed by: Midhun Manuel Thomas
- Screenplay by: Midhun Manuel Thomas; John Manthrickal
- Story by: Ashokan Cheruvil
- Produced by: Ashiq Usman
- Starring: Kalidas Jayaram; Aishwarya Lekshmi
- Cinematography: Renadive
- Edited by: Lijo Paul
- Music by: Gopi Sundar
- Production company: Ashiq Usman Productions
- Distributed by: Central Pictures
- Release date: 22 March 2019
- Running time: 140 minutes
- Country: India
- Language: Malayalam

Argentina Fans Kaattoorkadavu is a 2019 Indian Malayalam-language comedy-drama film directed by Midhun Manuel Thomas, starring Kalidas Jayaram and Aishwarya Lekshmi in leading roles. The film is written by Ashokan Cheruvil, John Manthrickal and Midhun Manuel Thomas. The film's musical score was composed by Gopi Sunder. It was released on 22 March 2019.

== Synopsis ==
The movie revolves around the story of Vipinan and his love for football and his lady love Mehru.

== Cast ==
- Kalidas Jayaram as Vipinan,
- Aishwarya Lekshmi as Mehrunnisa Khatherkutty,
- Anu K Aniyan as Najeeb Pambadan
- Austin Dan as Andrés Escobar
- Aneesh Gopal as Sunimon Arattukkuzhi
- Syam Cargoz as Ajayaghosh
- Aroop Sivdas as Vinod Aikkarakund
- Neeraj Karepparambil as Alex Palliveedan
- Paul Joseph as Raghavan
- Zhinz Shan as Thomas Mash
- Adv. P. Manikandan as Khatherkutty
- Arjun Ratan as Sejeer
- Sonia Giri as Suja
- Assim Jamal as Munir Koduvally
- Karthika Menon as Aryambika
- Arunamshu Dev as Vipinan's childhood

== Soundtrack ==
Track listing
No.	Title	Lyrics	Singer	Length
1.	"Kaathu Kaathe ..."	Harinarayanan BK	Sithara Krishnakumar	3:35
2.	"Eenthola..."	Harinarayanan BK	Sachin Raj	2:55
3.	"Hey Madhuchandrike..."	Harinarayanan BK	Vijay Yesudas	3:33
4.	"Nottam ..."	Harinarayanan BK	Gopi Sundar	1:09
5.	"Salutes Lionel Messi ..."	Midhun Manuel Thomas; Robin Varghese	Krishnalal B.S; Sachin Raj	1:26

== Release ==
The trailer of the film was released on 13 February 2019. The film was set to be released on 1 March 2019 but was later postponed to 22 March 2019.
