= Vikramadithyan =

- Film poster
- Directed by: Lal Jose
- Written by: Dr. Iqbal Kuttippuram
- Produced by: Lal Jose; Mohan Nambiar
- Starring: Dulquer Salman; Unni Mukundan; Namitha Pramod; Anoop Menon; Lena
- Cinematography: Jomon T. John
- Edited by: Ranjan Abraham
- Music by: Bijibal
- Production companies: LJ Films; Multiplex Movies
- Distributed by: LJ Films
- Release date: 25 July 2014
- Running time: 145 minutes
- Country: India
- Language: Malayalam

Vikramadithyan is a 2014 Indian Malayalam-language action comedy film co-produced and directed by Lal Jose. The film stars Dulquer Salmaan, Unni Mukundan, Namitha Pramod, Anoop Menon, and Lena. Nivin Pauly appears in an extended cameo role. The screenplay was written by Iqbal Kuttippuram while Jomon T. John handled the cinematography. The music is composed by Bijibal. The film was released on 25 July 2014, on the occasion of Eid-ul Fitr.

== Plot ==
Kunjunni Menon, a witty thief, falls in love with Lakshmi, a police constable. While following her one day, he finds out that she wishes to marry a policeman. Vasudeva Shenoy, Laksmi's colleague expresses his desire to marry her despite his mother's objections. Kunjunni poses as a police constable and manages to marry Lakshmi before Shenoy can convince his mother. Shenoy gets married, and both couples are blessed with baby boys on the same day. Lakshmi finds out that Kunjunni cheated her, but they pretend to have an amicable marriage. A young Adithyan still believes his father to be a policeman, and he and Shenoy's son Vikram become rivals in school and start competing with each other, wagering that the loser should salute the winner, a habit they then carry into adulthood. Adithyan always ends up losing.

One day, Kunjunni is caught red-handed by Shenoy and his team while attempting a robbery and is paraded half-naked throughout the street. Unable to face a distraught Adithyan and berated by Lakshmi, Kunjunni reaches a bridge and commits suicide. Years later, Vikram grows to be a hard-working young man while Adithyan becomes lazy and does petty illegal activities to earn money. Adithyan falls in love with Deepika who is Vikram's close friend. Once the duo pass their degrees, they both decide to apply for the SI selection test. Though the two share a healthy rivalry, Shenoy is spiteful towards Adithyan, who outranks Vikram in the preliminary round. However, Vikram acknowledges Adithyan's superior intellect, displaying his deep respect for his rival.

Shenoy traps Adithyan in a narcotics case and is desperate to put him behind bars. He also guards the evidence personally. Adithyan is saved when Vikram secretly swaps the evidence with lactose powder. Adithyan expresses his gratitude, revealing that the respect they hold is mutual. In a final attempt, Shenoy convinces Lakshmi that he is the one who swapped the evidence and asks her for a favor in return.By Shenoy’s request, Lakshmi hides the interview memo Adithyan was to receive and only Vikram's name appears on the list for the final exam. A heartbroken Adithyan blames Lakshmi for Kunjunni's death and claims that she could have changed him had she tried. Adithyan disappears that night.

2 years later, Vikram becomes the new SI and takes charge on the day of Shenoy's retirement. The new sub-collector Lokesh is one of the guests, and comes to congratulate the father and son. Lokesh reveals that he met Adithyan on a train journey to Delhi and stopped him from committing suicide. The two later became close friends and roommates. On Lokesh's insistence, Adithyan prepares for the UPSC exams while doing odd jobs in between. Both of them clear the exam together and Lokesh reveals that Adithyan is now an IPS officer in the Kerala cadre and has been posted as ACP, Shenoy and Vikram's superior. Shenoy is forced to accept defeat and salutes Adithyan.

Satisfied with his revenge, Adithyan decides not to tell Vikram. Vikram manages to find out and salutes Adithyan publicly. The two embrace and acknowledge their friendship. Vikram asks Adithyan to accept Deepika's love and reveals that his next goal will be to catch up with Adithyan.

== Cast ==
- Dulquer Salmaan as ACP Adithya Menon IPS (Aadhi)
  - Master Nived as teenage Adithyan
    - Master Ilhan as young Adithyan
- Unni Mukundan as SI Vikram Shenoy (Vikraman)
  - Tushar as young Vikram
- Nivin Pauly as Sub Collector Lokesh Kumar IAS (Extended Cameo appearance)
- Namitha Pramod as Deepika Pai
- Anoop Menon as CI Vasudeva Shenoy, Vikraman's father
- Lena as Police Constable Lakshmi Nair, Adithyan's mother
- Santhosh Keezhattoor as Kunjunni Menon, Adithyan's father
- Charmila as Vikraman's Mother
- Joy Mathew as Dr. Ramanath Pai, Deepika's father
- Sadiq as ASI Ravi, a police officer who is supportive of Adithyan
- Sidhartha Siva as Advocate Santhosh, Kunjunni's friend
- Irshad as ACP George Alexander, Narcotics Bureau
- Liimal G Padath as Vikram's Friend
- Sandeep Raj as Muthu, Aadhi's Friend
  - Chethan Jayalal as young Muthu
- Jiyad Irani as Harbinder, Aadhi's Friend
  - Anantha Krishanan as young Harbinder
- Gautam Pisharody as Sameer, Aadhi's Friend
  - Mishal as young Sameer
- Sana Althaf as Adhithyan's sister
- Manju Satheesh as Deepika's mother
- Cherthala Lalitha as Lakshmi's mother
- Suja Menon as TV Reporter
- Bindu Varappuzha

== Release ==
The film was released on 25 July 2014 on the occasion of Eid-ul Fitr.

== Reception ==
=== Critical reception ===
Dalton L of Deccan Chronicle rated the film 3 on a scale of 5 and concluded his review saying: "Lal Jose's nonlinear romantic love triangle may be somewhat idealistic in nature. However, it's a compelling entertainer that extols the virtues of education, work, perseverance, and the struggle for goodness; and inspires one to compete with nothing but the highest order." Nicy V. P of the International Business Times praised the script and called the film a perfect, well crafted flick for Eid and gave the film four stars on five. Paresh C. Palicha of Rediff wrote, "Vikramadityan is entertaining but with little depth."

P. Sanalkumar of Kerala Kaumudi was, however, critical of the film and called the script "weak". He was critical of the film's cinematography and acting by Anoop Menon. He concluded the review saying that the film is reserved only for those who are "meek and lowly in spirit".

=== Box office ===
The film was a commercial success, grossing approximately ₹11.5 crores in Kerala. The film collected US$34,767 from UK box office. The film collected $23,799 (₹14.53 lakhs) from US box office in its eight-week run. The film ran over 100 days in theatres.

== Soundtrack ==
All music is composed by Bijibal.

No.	Title	Artist(s)	Length
1.	"Manathe Chandanakeeru"	Pushpavathy	3:21
2.	"Vikramadithyan"	Yazin Nizar	3:10
3.	"Manassin Thinkale"	Shahabaz Aman	3:49
4.	"Mazhanila"	Soumya Ramakrishnan, Najim Arshad	3:58
5.	"Megham"	Madhu Balakrishnan, Jyotsna Radhakrishnan	3:24
6.	"Oru Kodi"	Ganesh Sundaram	3:07
7.	"Bana Har Dil Ki"	Krishna Bongane	3:59

== Awards ==
=== 2014 Kerala State Film Awards ===
- Second Best Actor – Anoop Menon
- Best Choreography - Sajna Najam
