= Theeram =

2017 film by Saheed Arafath

- Theeram Official Poster
- Directed by: Saheed Arafath
- Screenplay by: Prinish Prabhakaran
- Story by: Ansar Thajudeen
- Produced by: Shiek Afsal
- Starring: Maria John; Pranav Ratheesh
- Cinematography: Gautham Sankar
- Edited by: Vijay Sankar
- Music by: Afzal Yusuff; Sankar Sharma
- Release date: 21 July 2017
- Country: India
- Language: Malayalam

Theeram (transl. Shore) is a 2017 Indian Malayalam-language film directed by Saheed Arafath and scripted by Ansar Thajudeen from Prinish Prabhakaran's story. The lead roles are done by Maria John and Pranav Ratheesh. Theeram portraits an ordinary young man, Ali, makes a living by riding an auto rickshaw in the night. One day, he meets a woman called Suhra and falls in love with her. It tries to woo her in various ways but something from his past crops up, haunting his present.

== Cast ==
- Maria John as Suhra
- Pranav Ratheesh as Ali
- Tini Tom as the cop
- Dini Daniel
- Sudhi Koppa
- Nandan Unni
- Askar Ali
- Krishna Praba
- Anjali Nair

== Soundtrack ==
The film's soundtrack is composed by Afzal Yusuff and Sankar Sharma whereas lyrics being written by Harinarayanan BK, Aji Katoor, Rinu Razak and Siby Padiyara.

Track Listing
| No. | Title | Singer(s) | Lyrics | Music | Length |
|---|---|---|---|---|---|
| 1 | Njanum Neeyum | Shreya Ghoshal, Quincy Chettupally | Harinarayanan BK | Afzal Yusuff | 2:50 |
| 2 | Minnaminungu | Najim Arshad, Anweshaa | Aji Katoor | Afzal Yusuff | 4:03 |
| 3 | Njan Varumee Paathayilaai | Armaan Malik, Tabitha | Rinu Razak | Afzal Yusuff | 4:12 |
| 4 | Poru Nirayum | Niraj Suresh, Sanoop Kumar | Siby Padiyara | Sankar Sharma | 3:46 |

== Release ==
The movie was released on 19 May 2017. It got mixed reviews from the viewers and has not been released on any OTT platforms yet.

== Reception ==
K. R. Rejeesh from NOW RUNNING wrote, 'Theeram' is a shoddily made romantic drama and it fails to score on promising premises.

The movie apparently got a rating of 6.3 on Imdb.
