= Basheerinte Premalekhanam =

- Poster
- Directed by: Aneesh Anwar
- Written by: Shinod Shivam; Shamseer Ahammed; Bibin K Paulose
- Produced by: P. M. Harris; V. S. Muhammed Althaf
- Starring: Farhaan Faasil; Sana Althaf
- Cinematography: Sanjay Harris
- Edited by: Renjith Touchriver
- Music by: Vishnu Mohan Sithara
- Production company: Fort Entertainment
- Release date: July 21, 2017
- Country: India
- Language: Malayalam

Basheerinte Premalekhanam (transl. Basheer's Love Letter) is a 2017 Indian Malayalam-language period romantic comedy film directed by Aneesh Anwar. The film stars Farhaan Faasil and Sana Althaf. It was released on 21 July 2017.

The story revolves around Basheer and Suhra's love and how that impacts an entire village.

== Cast ==
- Farhaan Faasil as Basheer
- Sana Althaf as Suhara
- Manikandan R. Achari as Usman
  - Karthik Vishnu as Young Usman
- Madhu
- Sheela
- Aju Varghese
- Joy Mathew
- Shivaji Guruvayoor
- Indrans
- Sunil Sukhada
- Ponnamma Babu
- Ranjini Jose as Lailla
- Sooraj Harris
- Hareesh Perumanna
- Naseer Sankranthi
- Sreejith Ravi
- Noby Marcose

== Soundtrack ==
All music is composed by Vishnu Mohan Sithara.

No.	Title	Lyrics	Singer(s)	Length
1.	"Penne Penne"	Harinarayanan B.K	Vishnu Mohan Sithara	4:01
2.	"Sumbharani"	Arshid Sreedhar	Vishnu Mohan Sithara	3:27
3.	"Pranayamanithu"	R. Venugopal	Sachin Raj, Vishnu Mohan Sithara, Joyesh Chakraborty	3:55
4.	"TV"	Arshid Sreedhar	Anwar Sadath	3:41
5.	"Laila Laila"		Salih Haneef	4:45
