= Yelove =

Video by Siddharth Menon, Shreya Ghoshal
- Released: June 7, 2014
- Genre: Melody
- Length: 5:21
- Language: Malayalam
- Label: Yelove Music
- Directors: Bilu Tom Mathew, Ronnie Manuel Joseph

Music video
- "Yelove" on YouTube

Yelove is a Malayalam language melodic album by Ajith Mathew. The album contains a single titled "Moovanthi Chayum Neram," performed by Siddharth Menon and Shreya Ghoshal. Composed by Ajith Mathew, the song was produced by Shine Mathew and released by the label of Yelove Music. The song was released on June 7, 2014. As of 2014, Yelove has achieved 1 million views on YouTube.

== Development ==
Pre-production for the album started on August 1, 2013. The first step of the project, the melody, which depicts the theme, was created. In an interview with Deccan Chronicle, model-turned-actress Aditi Ravi commented that she was extremely delighted to participate in Menon's upcoming album. She also revealed that Shreya Ghoshal would lend her voice to the album, remarking that the song she sang was 'beyond words' and it was a thrilling experience for her that Ghoshal had sung for her. Since May 2014, various covers of the album as well as information regarding the crew members were published on social networking platforms. On May 28, 2014, a video was released featuring Menon talking about the album. A 23-second teaser of the album was released on June 5, 2014. In an interview, composer Ajith Mathew commented that "In western countries, the music album industry is a full-fledged industry. Our aim is to develop such a trend here. We wish to have a music industry parallel to the film industry. To penetrate into the mass market, we need to keep up the quality the public expects. Hence we have used well-known faces for this album".

== Release and reception ==
"This is the first time that I am trying such a project, singing and acting at one time. I hope people will accept the actor in me. Also, it was a nice experience singing with Shreya Ghoshal ma'am. Singing with her means a lot to me."

— Menon about his experience in being a part of Yelove

The video of "Moovanthi Chayum Neram" was finally unveiled on June 7, 2014. Yelove marks the third independent Malayalam non-film project of Shreya Ghoshal, the others being "Arikilumilla Nee" (Ennennun) and "Kandunjan Kannane" (Nandagopalam). The original MP3 audio of the song was made available for free digital download at Letstune. The story of Yelove is basically about two friends from a circle who ultimately realize their love for each other, though they deny it before. The project redefines love by introducing a new colour, 'Yelove' (a combination of the words 'Yellow' and 'Love'), instead of the traditional red. Singer Siddharth Menon of Thaikkudam Bridge fame makes his acting debut through this video. It is also the first album release of Aditi Ravi. Yelove was a huge hit on YouTube, gathering 100000 views within 3 days of its release. It also became one of the top trending videos from India. Yelove was even aired on Radio Mango 91.9 and Red FM 93.5.

== Personnel ==
As listed by the official YouTube channel of Ajith Mathew.

Technical and production

- Ajith Mathew – music
- Shine Mathew – producer
- Balu Thankachan – mixing
- Balu Thankachan – mastering
- Karthik Murali – Marketing
- Livingston Mathew – digital editing
- Livingston Mathew – color grading
- Bilu Tom Mathew – cinematography
- Dony Benedict – copywriting

Visuals and imagery

- Siddharth Menon – actor
- Aditi Ravi – actor
- Bilu Tom Mathew – direction
- Ronnie Manuel Joseph – direction
- Athul Ramachandran – associate direction
- Abhijith Jithu – associate direction
- Harikrishnan Prathap – project designing
- Suresh Pisharody – make-up artist
- Suresh Pisharody – hair stylist
- Arjun Haridas – make-up associate
- Sreenu V. – casting direction
- Prem Krishna – title designing

On instruments

- William Francis – keyboard programming
- Sumesh Parameshwar – acoustic guitar
- Sumesh Parameshwar – nylon guitar
- James Taylor – electric violin
- Ajith Mathew – additional programming

Sounding

- Ajith Mathew – music
- Shreya Ghoshal – vocal
- Siddharth Menon – vocal
- Vineeth Kumar – recording engineer
- Tony Joseph – recording engineer
- Pallivathukal Kiran Lal – recording engineer
- Sachin – recording engineer
- Philip Thekkolil – recording engineer

Crew

- Jijo Thomas
- Tom Joseph
- Praveen B.
- Arun K.V.
- Bilin Babu
- Jeffy Mariam Joy
- Sanal Raj
- Prasobh Vijayan
- Renjith Krishnan
- Manu Justine
- Jose Justine
- Jijin John
