= Annan Thampi =

2008 Indian Malayalam-language film by Anwar Rasheed

Annan Thambi
- Film Poster
- Directed by: Anwar Rasheed
- Written by: Benny P. Nayarambalam
- Produced by: Anto Joseph; Shahul Hameed Marikar
- Starring: Mammootty; Lakshmi Rai; Gopika; Siddique; Harisree Ashokan; Suraj Venjaramoodu; Salim Kumar; Janardhanan; Rajan P. Dev
- Cinematography: Loganathan Srinivasan
- Edited by: Don Max
- Music by: Original songs: Rahul Raj; Background score: Alex Paul
- Production company: Marikar Films
- Distributed by: Marikar Release
- Release date: 17 April 2008
- Country: India
- Language: Malayalam
- Budget: ₹3.78 crore

Annan Thampi (or Annan Thambi) is a 2008 Indian Malayalam-language action comedy film directed by Anwar Rasheed. The film stars Mammootty in dual role, along with Lakshmi Rai, Gopika in lead roles with Siddique, Harisree Ashokan, Suraj Venjaramood, Salim Kumar, Janardhanan, Rajan P. Dev, in supporting roles. The film was a box office success.

== Plot ==
Annan Thampi is the story of twin brothers, Appu and Achu. Appu is a bully who always finds himself in trouble whereas Achu is a naïve speech impaired. Their father Ravunni, a ballet artist, separates them due to sibling rivalry and Appu is sent to live with relatives in Pollachi. The astrologer Madhava Panicker says that the twins are going to be rivals for life and only way to avoid their fighting is to separate them. He says that Appu, should be sent to Pollachi. But when Appu refuses, Madhavan threatens to beat him. This drives Appu frustruated and he tries to kill the Madhavan by dropping a rock on his head. Madhavan is seriously injured and dies but when Appu gets caught by Madhavan's brother-in-law, he acts as Achu, which leads to him to be arrested for the crime even though he is innocent.

30 years later, Appu grows up to be a lovable gangster who falls for Thenmozhi, while Achu marries Lakshmi. Achu does not have kids. But soon major misunderstandings created by their enemies crop up and the brothers are baying for each other's blood. One day, Thenmozhi gets killed by someone and Achu gets framed and arrested, by a false complaint given by Achu's rival and enemy Bharathan. After getting released, Madhavan's sister reveals to Achu that Madhavan was actually killed by his brother-in-law as he tried to expose his wrongdoing to the police and Thenmozhi was actually killed by Appu's friend Govindan, who was Madhavan's son and while tring to rape her, he killed her by accident. She also revealed Govindan teamed up their enemies and made the problems as he thought Appu and Achu killed Madhavan. Eventually, Appu realises Govindan's true face while hitting Achu, thinking that he killed Thenmozhi. They team afterwards and defeats Govindan. Govindan gets arrested by Shyamalan and Appu and Achu goes back to their house. Appu goes back to Pollachi and he gives his son to Achu and Lakshmi to bring him as their son.

== Cast ==
- Mammootty in a dual role as:
  - Appu
    - Sonu as young Appu
  - Achu
    - Monu as young Achu
  - (Body doubling by Tini Tom)
- Lakshmi Rai as Thenmozhi, Appu's wife
- Gopika as Lakshmi, Achu's wife
- Janardhanan as Ravunni, Achu's and Appu's father
- Siddique as Govindan
  - Harimurali as young Govindan
- Harisree Ashokan as Chandran, Achu's friend
- Suraj Venjarammoodu as Peethambaran, Achu's friend
- Salim Kumar as SI Shyamalan
- Rajan P. Dev as Dharmarajan, Thenmozhi's uncle
- Bose Venkat as Pollachi Circle Inspector Anbuarasan
- Maniyanpilla Raju as Rajashekharan, Appu's and Achu's uncle at Pollachi
- Urmila Unni as Padmavathy, Achu's and Appu's mother
- Shivani Bhai as Ammu, Achu's and Appu's sister
- Jayan Cherthala as Madhava Panicker, Govindan's father
- Mohan Jose as Vijayan, Madhavan's brother-in-law and Govindan's uncle
- K. P. A. C. Lalitha as Bhadra, Madhavan's sister and Govindan's aunt
- Anil Murali as Bharathan, Govindan's friend and co-conspirator
- Joju George as Prakashan, right hand of Bharathan
- Kiran Raj as Shiva
- Bijukuttan as Santhosh, dance teacher
- Lakshmi Priya as a drama artist
- Kainakary Thankaraj as Panchayath President
- Pauly Valsan as Peethambaran's aunt
- Kalabhavan Shajohn as Kannappan, the village drunkard

== Release ==
The film was released in 75 screens across Kerala. It was made on a budget of ₹3.78 crore.

=== Box office ===
The film was a commercial success.it went on to become 2nd highest grosser of the year behind twenty20. The film collected ₹2 crore from 4 days at the Kerala box office. In two weeks the film had a record distributors share of ₹3.12 crore from 75 screens and gross collection of ₹9.36 crore. It grossed Rs. 30 million in 17 days. It grossed ₹12.75 crore from five weeks.

MG's from B & C stations - Rs 4. 22 crore, Overseas and Indian domestic - Rs 45 lakhs, Television Rights - Rs 95 lakhs, Telugu Remake Rights - Rs 35 lakhs × Total from all rights = Rs 5 . 97 crore # Profit in 25 days = Rs 2.19 crore.

== Music ==
Annan Thambi

Soundtrack album by Rahul Raj
- Released: 15 July 2009
- Recorded: Sound Of Music, Chennai, India
- Genre: Soundtrack
- Length: 19:16
- Label: Satyam Audios
- Producer: Rahul Raj

Rahul Raj chronology
Time (2009)	Annan Thambi (2009)	Malabar Wedding (2010)

All songs were composed by Rahul Raj.

Song title	Singers
"Chemban Kaale"	Jassie Gift
"Ra Chaakanu Pekaali"	Afsal, Pradeep Palluruthy, Jyotsna, Smitha Nishant
"Kanmaniye Punyam Nee"	Vineeth Sreenivasan
"Kaikkudanna Pakarnnoru"	Madhu Balakrishnan
