= Rahul Raj =

Indian music composer

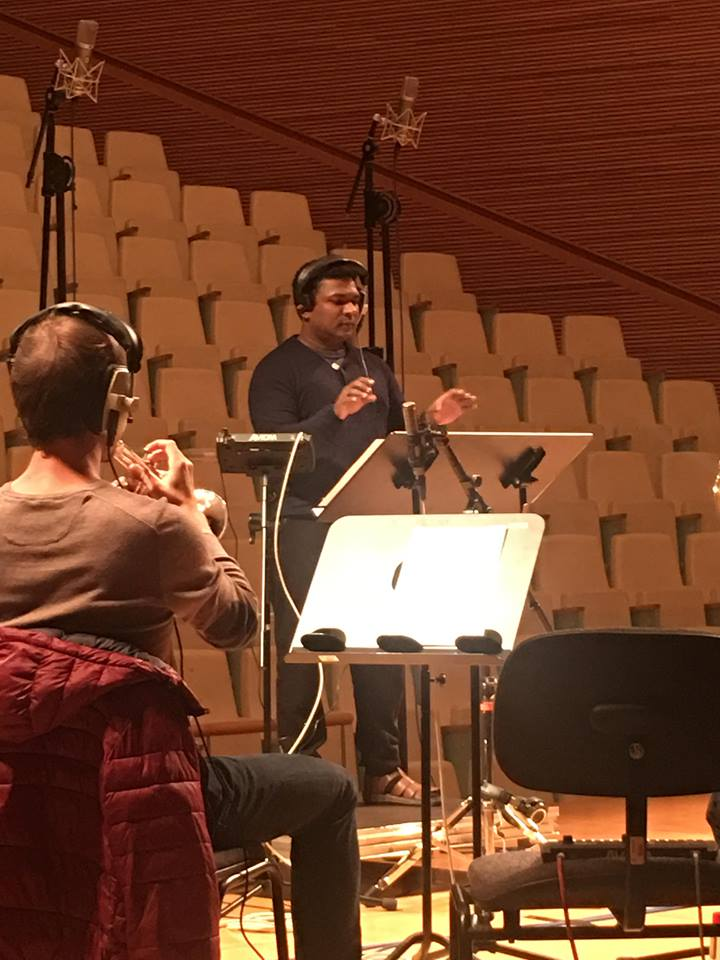

Background information
- Born: Kochi, Kerala, India
- Occupations: Music Composer; orchestrator; Record producer; Music director; singer
- Years active: 2007–present
- Musical career
- Genres: Film score; Filmi; World music; Classical
- Instruments: Piano; Electronic keyboard; MIDI Master keyboards; synthesizer; guitar; drums
- Labels: Sony Music; Satyam Audios; Muzik 247; Manorama Music; Saina Music

Rahul Raj is an Indian music composer. He has composed and produced scores and soundtracks predominantly for Malayalam movies. He is an alumnus of the prestigious Berklee College of Music and holds a postgraduate degree in scoring for films, TV and video games.

== Early life ==
Rahul Raj was born in Kochi to Advocate E. Thankappan and N. S. Kunjoonjamma. His schooling was in Bhavans Vidya Mandir, Elamakkara Kochi. He has one sister, Rehna Raj. From the age of 6, he was trained in Mridangam and Carnatic Music. He graduated as an IT Engineer from CUSAT, Kochi and later on pursued courses such as CCNP and CCIE in Bangalore ILloka networks, before moving to London.

During his stint in London, he underwent training in Electronic Sound Production. He helped Pradeep Menon, a UK-based Indian businessman, remix a Tamil Ayappa record that was originally produced, composed and sung by Pradeep Menon and Shashi Kumar in 1985. The devotional album produced in the UK, Canada and India is titled Sabari Beats.

== Career ==
On returning to India, Raj composed more than 100 jingles for commercials in Malayalam, Tamil, Hindi and Telugu. During this period, he had also composed original themes for many television productions, including shows for Asianet and Amrita TV.

His first feature film score and soundtrack were for Chotta Mumbai, directed by Anwar Rasheed starring Mohanlal in the lead. The film was a major box-office success and became a cult classic leaving a lasting impact on Kerala's popular cinema. The soundtrack album became a pop culture phenomenon over the years.

In 2008, he scored a hit with Anwar Rasheed's Mammootty-starrer Annan Thampi. But his subsequent releases that year, including Malabar Wedding and Crazy Gopalan failed to make any impact.

His only release in 2009 was Shyamaprasad's Ritu, for which he won the Vayalar Award. The award was given by a jury of old school musicians including K.P. Udayabhanu.

In 2010, he won the Kerala State Award for Best Background Score for Ritu. The same year, he was invited to University at Buffalo, The State University of New York to rework and expand Pomp and Circumstance Marches, the traditional convocation music used by them, composed by Sir Edward Elgar. In addition to expanding Edward Elgar's piece, he composed two original music pieces for the convocation, Dance of the Gods and The Circumstance by Rahul Raj. In the same year he signed a project called Mathilukalkkapuram, a sequel to Adoor Gopalakrishnan's classic Mathilukal. The Mammootty starrer which also had Ravi K. Chandran and Resul Pookutty on board as cinematographer and sound designer respectively was subsequently shelved.

In 2011, Rahul Raj made his debut in Telugu cinema by composing music for the Siddharth – Shruti Haasan starrer Oh My Friend. The audio of the film opened to overwhelming responses and rave reviews, climbing to the No. 1 position in Telugu music charts, with the song "Maa Daddy Pockets" in particular becoming a rage among the youth. The audio went on to mark record sales of 3 lakh CDs within nine days of release.

After almost a two-year hiatus, in 2012 he returned to the Malayalam industry by scoring for Amal Neerad's Bachelor Party. The songs became sensational hits and the background score received critical acclaim.

In 2013, he composed for Kili Poyi, which was supposedly the first stoner film in Malayalam Cinema. Though the film opened to mixed responses, the title song became a huge hit. Several critics hailed the background score as the most interesting technical aspect of the movie.

Rahul Raj had a dull opening in 2014 with the high budget romantic comedy London Bridge and Mannar Mathai Speaking 2 the much hyped sequel to the cult comedy classic Mannar Mathai Speaking failing at the box office. Raj had composed only three tracks for London Bridge, as he had to leave the project owing to scheduling conflicts. Later in the year, the Telugu film Paathshala for which he had composed, became a box office success. Rahul's songs for the movie were received well, but it was his background score that was unanimously praised by all reviewers, as a major plus point, crediting it to have elevated the movie to a different level.

The year 2015 opened on a favourable note for Rahul Raj, as his background score for the Mammootty starrer Fireman received praise. His second release of the year was Sidhartha Siva's Ain which won the National Film Award for Best Feature Film in Malayalam. The month of August saw the release of his songs from Kohinoor, a heist film set in the 1980s. The song Hemanthamen went on to rake in unanimous praise from critics and public alike, being hailed as an outstanding nostalgic melody.

The year 2017 opened on an excellent note with his song Lailakame from Ezra becoming a smash hit, prompting several cover versions, including one by Rahul Raj himself.

In early 2018, the film Kuttanadan Marpappa met with negative reviews with the music too receiving a lukewarm response. He signed Academy Award Winner Resul Pookutty's multilingual titled The Sound Story directed by Pookutty's protege Prasad Prabhakar. The movie was touted to feature 164 tracks comprising background score pieces and 2 songs. He composed the songs of the film, but opted out before composing the background score, as there were schedule conflicts with his stint in Berklee, Spain.

In June 2019, he composed and conducted the symphonic piece Birth of the Nemesis, which was performed by the London Orchestra. He returned from Europe in July 2019 and was immediately signed by Priyadarshan to compose the background score of his magnum opus Marakkar: Arabikadalinte Simham, a historical epic set in the 16th century. Having no release in 2020 due to pandemic-induced postponements, his first release after the 2020 lockdown was the Mammootty-starrer The Priest in early 2021. The film opened to mixed reviews, but the music met with overwhelmingly positive responses, particularly the score with IBTimes hailing it as the major highlight of the film. His first release in 2022 was the Mohanlal-starrer Aarattu, directed by B. Unnikrishnan which received predominantly positive reviews for the music, despite the film being critically panned. Meanwhile, veteran director Sathyan Anthikad signed him to score his Jayaram-starrer Makal. He scored two films in 2023, both ending up has box-office duds with the music too making no significant impact. His notable upcoming releases are the Suresh Gopi-starrer Varaaham directed by Sanal V. Devan, The Statesman directed by Kishore Prakash Menon and an untitled film directed by Rathish Ambat in Malayalam; Yaar in Tamil; and another untitled film in Hindi.

In 2013, Rahul Raj was designated as the President of the FEFKA Music Directors' Union, the official association of film composers in the Malayalam film industry.

== Film discography ==
=== 2000s ===
Year	Film	Language	Songs	Score	Director	Other notes
2007	Chotta Mumbai •	Malayalam	Yes	Yes	Anwar Rasheed	
2007	Time •	Malayalam	Yes	Yes	Shaji Kailas	Winner – JayCee Foundation Award for Best Music Direction
2008	Annan Thambi •	Malayalam	Yes	No	Anwar Rasheed	
2008	Malabar Wedding •	Malayalam	Yes	Yes	Rajesh-Faisal	
2008	One Way Ticket •	Malayalam	Yes	No	Bipin Prabhakar	
2008	Maya Bazar •	Malayalam	Yes	No	Thomas Sebastian	
2008	Crazy Gopalan •	Malayalam	Yes	No	Deepu Karunakaran	
2009	Ritu •	Malayalam	Yes	Yes	Shyamaprasad	Winner – Kerala State Film Award – Best Background Score; Winner – Vayalar Movie Award – Best Music Direction

=== 2010s ===
Year	Film	Language	Songs	Score	Director	Other notes
2010	Chekavar •	Malayalam	Yes	Yes	Sajeevan	
2011	Oh My Friend •	Telugu	Yes	No	Venu Sriram	Telugu Debut. Winner – Maa Music Award – Best Debut Music Composer
2012	Bachelor Party •	Malayalam	Yes	Yes	Amal Neerad	
2013	Kili Poyi •	Malayalam	Yes	Yes	Vinay Govind	
2013	Paisa Paisa•	Malayalam	No	Yes	Prasanth Murali	Background Score only.
2013	D Company •	Malayalam	No	Yes	Vinod Vijayan	Anthology film. Segment: Day of Judgement.
2014	London Bridge •	Malayalam	Yes	No	Anil C. Menon	Opening Credits Theme & 2 songs only.
2014	Mannar Mathai Speaking 2 •	Malayalam	Yes	Yes	Mamas K. Chandran	
2014	Kadavul Paathi Mirugam Paathi •	Tamil	Yes	Yes	Raj-Suresh	Tamil Debut.
2014	Paathasala •	Telugu	Yes	Yes	Mahi V. Raghav	
2015	Fireman •	Malayalam	No	Yes	Deepu Karunakaran	
2015	Ain •	Malayalam	Yes	Yes	Sidhartha Siva	
2015	Kohinoor •	Malayalam	Yes	Yes	Vinay Govind	
2015	Style •	Malayalam	No	Yes	Binu Sadanandan	Background Score only.
2016	Mudhugauv •	Malayalam	Yes	Yes	Vipin Das	
2016	Karingunnam Sixes •	Malayalam	Yes	Yes	Deepu Karunakaran	
2016	Kasaba•	Malayalam	Yes	Yes	Nithin Renji Panicker	
2016	White •	Malayalam	Yes	Yes	Uday Ananthan	
2016	IDI- Inspector Dawood Ibrahim •	Malayalam	Yes	Yes	Sajid Yahiya	
2017	Ezra •	Malayalam	Yes	No	Jay K	
2017	E •	Malayalam	Yes	Yes	Kukku Surendran	
2017	Sherlock Toms •	Malayalam	No	Yes	Shafi	
2018	Hey Jude •	Malayalam	Yes	No	Shyamaprasad	One song only.
2018	Kaly •	Malayalam	Yes	Yes	Najim Koya	
2018	Vikadakumaran •	Malayalam	Yes	No	Boban Samuel	
2018	Kuttanadan Marpappa •	Malayalam	Yes	Yes	Sreejith Vijayan	
2018	B. Tech •	Malayalam	Yes	Yes	Mridul Nair	
2018	Ente Mezhuthiri Athazhangal •	Malayalam	No	Yes	Sooraj Tom	
2018	Dakini •	Malayalam	Yes	No	Rahul Riji Nair	Guest composer. Two songs only.
2018	The Sound Story •	Malayalam	Yes	No	Prasad Prabhakar	Announced by Resul Pookutty. Multilingual film.
2019	Kodathi Samaksham Balan Vakeel •	Malayalam	Yes	No	B. Unnikrishnan	Announced by Viacom 18 Motion Pictures. Guest composer. Two songs only.
2019	Oru Nakshathramulla Aakasham •	Malayalam	Yes	No	Ajith Pulleri, Suneesh Babu	Guest composer. Two songs only.

=== 2020s ===
Year	Film	Language	Songs	Score	Director	Other notes
2021	The Priest •	Malayalam	Yes	Yes	Jofin T. Chacko	
2021	Lalbagh •	Malayalam	Yes	Yes	Prasanth Murali	
2021	Marakkar: Lion of the Arabian Sea •	Malayalam	No	Yes	Priyadarshan	
2022
2022	Aaraattu •	Malayalam	Yes	Yes	B. Unnikrishnan	
2022	Freedom Fight •	Malayalam	Yes	Yes	Jeo Baby	Anthology film. Segment Old Age Home.
2022	Makal •	Malayalam	No	Yes	Sathyan Anthikad	
2022	Eesho •	Malayalam	No	Yes	Nadirshah	
2023
2023	Lovefully Yours Veda •	Malayalam	Yes	Yes	Praghesh Sukumaran	
2023	Dance Party •	Malayalam	Yes	Yes	Sohan Seenulal	Three songs and score.
2024
2024	Pushpaka Vimanam •	Malayalam	Yes	Yes	Ullas Krishna	
2024	Porattu Nadakam •	Malayalam	Yes	Yes	Noushad Saffron	
2024	Manorathangal •	Malayalam	Yes	Yes	Rathish Ambat	
2025
2025	Narayaneente Moonnaanmakkal •	Malayalam	Yes	Yes	Sharan Venugopal	
2025	Oka Padhakam Prakaram	Telugu	Yes	No	Vinod Vijayan	
2025	Aabhyanthara Kuttavaali •	Malayalam	No	Yes	Sethu Nath Padmakumar	
2026	Ottam Thullal †	Malayalam	Yes	Yes	G. Marthandan	
2026	Varaaham •	Malayalam	Yes	Yes	Sanal V. Devan	
2026	Kaalante Thangakkudam •	Malayalam	Yes	Yes	Nithish K.T.R	
2026	The Statesman •	Malayalam	Yes	Yes	Kishore Prakash Menon	

=== Short films ===
Year	Title	Director	Notes
2020	Mattoru Kadavil	Rahul K Shaji	
2025	Adavi The Forest	Rahul K Shaji	Pre Production in Progress

== Awards and nominations ==
Award	Year	Project	Category	Outcome
Kerala State Film Award	2009	Ritu	Best Background Score	Won
Vayalar Movie Award	2009	Ritu	Best Music Composer	Won
Jay Cee Foundation Award	2007	Time	Best Music Composer	Won
Maa Music Award	2011	Oh My Friend	Best Debut Music Composer (Telugu)	Won
Flowers Music Awards	2018	Lailakame (Ezra)	Best Song Composition	Won
