= Ritu (2009 film) =

- Theaterical release poster
- Directed by: Shyamaprasad
- Written by: Joshua Newtonn
- Produced by: Vachan Shetty
- Starring: Nishan; Asif Ali; Rima Kallingal; Jaya Menon; Vinay Forrt
- Cinematography: Shamdat Sainudeen
- Edited by: Vinod Sukumaran
- Music by: Rahul Raj
- Distributed by: Playhouse Release
- Release date: 14 August 2009
- Running time: 130 minutes
- Country: India
- Language: Malayalam

Ritu (English: Season) is a 2009 Indian Malayalam-language film directed by Shyamaprasad. The original screenplay was written by Joshua Newtonn. This was Shyamaprasad's first film based on an original screenplay. All his previous films were adaptations of published novels or plays. It is widely acclaimed as the 'coming of age' of Malayalam cinema. This movie marked the Malyalam debut of Nishan and Asif Ali.

== Plot ==
Ritu is about three youngsters growing up together and betraying each other. The story follows the lives of three childhood friends: Sunny Immatty (Asif Ali), Sarath Varma (Nishan K. P. Nanaiah), and Varsha John (Rima Kallingal). The trio were almost inseparable as friends and grew up in the same neighborhood in love, bonding, and innocence. They shared the dream of journeying together in life forever.

Sarath leaves for the United States to help his brother-in-law with his business. He also aspires to write a book someday. But still, he clings on to the memories of the good old days with his friends and wishes to reunite and work with them again. So, after three years, he comes back to India and starts a small company with Varsha and Sunny to initiate an ambitious new project. He soon finds out that their strong bond of friendship has almost vanished. Varsha and Sunny's lifestyles and mindsets have changed over the years. Varsha flirts with men while Sunny is interested in only earning money by hook or crook. Whether their friendship will return or deteriorate even more forms the rest of the movie.

== Cast ==
- Nishan K. P. Nanaiah as Sarath Varma
- Asif Ali as Sunny Emmatty
- Rima Kallingal as Varsha John
- K. Govindankutty as Rama Varma (Sarath's father)
- M. G. Sasi as Hari Varma (Sarath's Brother)
- Jaya Menon as Zarina Balu
- Prakash Menon as Balu
- Manu Jose as Jithu
- Sidharth Shiva as Pranchi
- Kalamandhalam Radhika as Sarath's mother
- Vinay Forrt as Jamal
- Shyamnath Ravindranath
- Satthya

== Soundtrack ==
Ritu

Soundtrack album by Rahul Raj
- Released: 15 July 2009
- Recorded: Sound Of Music, Chennai, India
- Genre: Soundtrack
- Length: 34 Minutes
- Label: Satyam Audios
- Producer: Rahul Raj

Rahul Raj chronology
Crazy Gopalan (2009)	Ritu (2009)	Chekavar (2010)

The original score and songs were composed, arranged, programmed, and produced by Rahul Raj, with lyrics penned by Rafeeq Ahammed. Rahul Raj won the Kerala State Film Award for Best Background Music for his work.

List of songs
No.	Title	Lyrics	Singer(s)	Length
1.	"Venal Kattil"	Rafeeq Ahammed	Rahul Raj	4:47
2.	"Pularumo"	Rafeeq Ahammed	Suchith Suresan, Gayatri Asokan	5:53
3.	"Ku Ku Ku Theevandi"	Rafeeq Ahammed	Jeetu	4:03
4.	"Chanchalam/Cindrella"	Rafeeq Ahammed	Neha Nair, Job Kurian	4:55
5.	"Love Kills"		Smitha Nishant	4:30

== Release and reception ==
Years after the release of the movie and an avalanche of new-gen films, critics acclaimed Ritu as the pioneer of 'new wave' in Malayalam cinema. Upon the release, Ritu received generally positive reviews but mild response in theatres. Nowrunning.com sees Ritu as a sensitive, melancholic portrayal of tumultuous emotions that ravage three young minds basking on the pinnacle of success. "It is an engrossing, intricate slice-of-life that deftly captures the nuances of growing up together and finally growing apart." Rediff and Indiaglitz reviewers termed it as a worthwhile experiment and said that it represents the changing face of Malayalam cinema.

The acting skills of the three lead actors have been applauded: the newcomers did their part quite convincingly. Indiaglitz review said "It's high time for Mollywood film goers to change and settle down from the regular potboilers and applaud films like Ritu which has its heart exactly at the right place". Rediff said "Ritu is a worthwhile experiment by seasoned director Shyamaprasad with a predominantly new team".

The Telugu version of Ritu, titled New, was released under two banners: Bhargava Pictures and Innostorm entertainment.
