= Kerala Cafe =

- Directed by: Ranjith; M. Padmakumar; Shanker Ramakrishnan; Shaji Kailas; Uday Ananthan; Anjali Menon; B. Unnikrishnan; Shyamaprasad; Anwar Rasheed; Revathy; Lal Jose
- Written by: Deedi Damodaran; Rajesh Jayaram; Lal Jose; Anjali Menon; Joshua Newton; M. Padmakumar; Unni R.; Shanker Ramakrishnan; Ahmed Sidhique; B. Unnikrishnan
- Produced by: Ranjith
- Starring: Mammootty; Prithviraj Sukumaran; Suresh Gopi; Jayasurya; Fahadh Faasil; Dileep; Navya Nair; Jyothirmayi; Nithya Menen; Sona Nair; Rima Kallingal
- Cinematography: Manoj Pillai; Anil Nair; Vijay Ulaganath; Sujith Vaassudev; Hari Nair; M. J. Radhakrishnan; Shamdat Saifudheen; Alagappan N.; Suresh Rajan; Prakash Kutty; Madhu Ambat; S. Kumar
- Edited by: Ranjan Abraham; Manoj; Samjith Mohammed; Vijay Shankar; V. T. Sreejith; John Kutty; B. Lenin; Vivek Harshan; Rajalakshmi; Mahesh Narayanan
- Music by: Ishaan Dev; Ouseppachan; Bijibal; M. Jayachandran; Rahul Raj; Isaac Thomas Kottukapally; Rex Vijayan; Bombay Jayashree; Manu Ramesan; Thej Marvin
- Production company: Capitol Theatres
- Distributed by: Backwater Media & Entertainment Private Ltd.
- Release dates: 9 October 2009 (Abu Dhabi); 29 October 2009 (Kerala)
- Country: India
- Language: Malayalam

Kerala Cafe is a 2009 Indian Malayalam-language anthology film consisting of ten short film segments, combined together by Ranjith, including short films directed by M. Padmakumar, Shankar Ramakrishnan, Shaji Kailas, Uday Ananthan, Anjali Menon, B. Unnikrishnan, Shyamaprasad, Anwar Rasheed, Revathy, and Lal Jose. The film stars an ensemble cast of all segments.

== List of short films ==
Title	Director	Writer	Cinematographer
Prologue	Ranjith	Ranjith	Manoj Pillai
Nostalgia	M. Padmakumar	M. Padmakumar (Based on the poem Nattuvaazhikal)	Anil Nair
Island Express	Shankar Ramakrishnan	Shankar Ramakrishnan	S Kumar
Lalitham Hiranmayam	Shaji Kailas	Rajesh Jayaraman	Sujith Vaassudev
Mrityunjayam	Uday Ananthan	Ahmed Sidhique	Hari Nair
Happy Journey	Anjali Menon	Anjali Menon	M. J. Radhakrishnan
Aviraamam	B. Unnikrishnan	B. Unnikrishnan	Shamdat Sainudeen
Off-season	Shyamaprasad	Joshua Newtonn	Alagappan N.
Bridge	Anwar Rasheed	Unni R.	Suresh Rajan
Makal	Revathy	Deedi Damodaran	Madhu Ambat
Puram Kazchakal	Lal Jose	Lal Jose (Based on C. V. Sreeraman's short story Puramkazchakal)	Vijay Ulaganath

== Plots ==
Kerala Cafe is an anthology film comprising ten distinct short stories, each narrating a different tale. Though independent in theme and characters, the stories are subtly interconnected. The Kerala Cafe serves as the sole common link, with each narrative either passing through or making a brief visit to the cafe.

=== Nostalgia (First segment) ===
Nostalgia that is loosely based on Venugopal's poem Naatuvazhikal is the first film that unfolds. Johnykutty is employed in the Middle East, who claims to friends to long to return to Kerala some day. On a vacation back to India though, he despises the government and the potholes on the road, the bureaucracy and the people. Having signed a deal to sell off his ancestral mansion, enrolling his kids in a boarding school, and making fake promises to his old friend, he flies back to Dubai, to commence his nostalgic laments all over again.

=== Island Express (Second segment) ===
The hero zooms down and starts talking to the audiences about Jesus, Frankenstein and Mangalassery Neelakantan, the idol trio who have had a say in his life. With his 'editor-publisher hanging around his arms, the writer that he is, goes off to Kerala, promising her that he would provide traditional attire to cover her up when they reach there. An aged woman waits for her bus at a bus station, while an army officer sitting nearby dozes off, his head resting gently on her shoulders. A dishevelled looking man in his fifties, brushes aside the advances of a teenage girl in a shabby looking lodge, as he prepares to go somewhere. Island Express bonds together these diverse characters and more in a dramatic climax.

=== Lalitham Hiranmayam (Third segment) ===
Ramesh is caught between his wife Lalitha and mistress Mayi and has to take the big decision now. The turmoil that goes on inside the man's mind is slickly edited and trendily depicted on screen. Ramesh discloses his affair with Mayi to Lalitha before his accidental death, and Lalitha accepts Mayi and her child as part of her life.

=== Mrityunjayam (Fourth segment) ===
Mrityunjayam has a journalist doing an investigative story on a spooky old 'Mana' (ancestral Kerala house) that in its owner's own words is a 'very different and peculiar place'. He falls in love with a girl, the owner's granddaughter who greets him at the door there, and straight away ask her if she would marry him. She is taken aback but all the more impressed by his candidness. He then proceeds to the "Mana" to unveil the mystery despite its owner's cautionary warning, and returns to visit the girl again. In the end the journalist also succumbs to the mystery of the "Mana", and is found dead inside, the next morning. It is revealed that it was his ghost that came to visit the girl that night.

=== Happy Journey (Fifth segment) ===
A middle aged man delights himself with a bit of flirting with a girl sitting beside him on a bus from Ernakulam to Kozhikode. Edging his way into the girl's seat and engaging in worthless conversation, he is all optimistic about the night that lies ahead. The girl on the other hand is initially uncomfortable, but all of a sudden composedly takes on a different garb that stuns the man. Against all odds, she would keep her head above the water, and a calmness descends on her that is at once creepy and confident. A psychological combat between the two ensues that concludes in an impressive climax.

=== Aviramam (Sixth segment) ===
Aviramam talks of life that would go on, even as one strives to put an end to it all. Devi wakes up to find her doting husband Ravi beside her with a cup of tea. Gulping down the tea, she talks of 'how horrible a kisser' he was. There is talk of the recession eating into the IT sector and Ravi's business in particular before they get ready to leave for the railway station with their kids. Having seen off his family on a short vacation of three days, Ravi heads back home and gets a noose ready to finally call it a day. But the true love of Devi prevents any mishaps and they decide to take on life as it comes.

=== Off Season (Seventh segment) ===
Kunjappai gets all pepped up as he comes across a foreigner couple on an almost empty Kovalam beach. His hopes of earning some quick money are dashed when he learns that they are broke and have actually traveled all the way from Lisbon looking for work in India. But Kunjappai and the couple bond well, and soon all's well that ends well

=== Bridge (Eighth segment) ===
Bridge illustrates the obvious symbols of loss, misery and desolation. The film talks about two parallel tracks, the first one involving a boy and his pet kitten. The father discards the pet kitten to discipline the child, but the child falls ill, and the father then sets out to find the kitten to calm his son, but to no avail. The other story has a son, who lives in poor surroundings, deciding to leave his ailing mother in the street. In the end, it is shown that the old lady and the kitten have found each other, and both are sitting on the verandah of Kerala Cafe.

=== Makal (Ninth segment) ===
Makal explores the theme of child exploitation. The story follows a girl who is taken from her village by a couple under the guise of adoption. While it initially appears to be a generous act, the narrative gradually reveals a darker motive, exposing issues related to child-trafficking.

=== Puram Kazhchakal (Tenth segment) ===
Puram Kazhchakal portrays a nameless man aboard a bus trudging along a hill terrain. His anger and impatience at the slow moving vehicle is being amusedly watched by a fellow passenger who gulps down his own memories.

== Cast ==
- Sathyan Anthikkad as himself (narrator)

=== Nostalgia ===
- Dileep as Johny
- Navya Nair as Sheela, Johny's wife
- Sudheesh as Jose, Johny's classmate
- Suresh Krishna as Suresh, Johny's coworker
- Babu Namboothiri as Johny's father
- Sreelatha Namboothiri as Johny's mother
- Ambika Mohan as the mother superior
- Anil Murali as Sreekumar Pillai

=== Island Express ===
- Prithviraj Sukumaran as Leon
- Jayasurya as Vishal Krishnan
- Sukumari as Narayani
- Rahman as Renjith
- Maniyanpilla Raju as the driver of Island Express
- Kani Kusruti as Zeba, Leon's love interest
- Shelly Kishore as Kaveri
- Sreejith Ravi as a person in the club
- M. A. Baby as himself
- Geethu Christie as Renjith's love interest

=== Lalitham Hiranmayam ===
- Suresh Gopi as Ramesh
- Jyothirmayi as Lalitha, Ramesh's wife
- Dhanya Mary Varghese as Hiranmayi, Ramesh's love interest
- Jayan Cherthala as Ramesh's friend

=== Mrityunjayam ===
- Fahadh Faasil as the journalist, after died (Sprit)
- Thilakan as Thirumeni, owner of Vanneri Mana
- Rima Kallingal as Thirumeni's granddaughter
- Anoop Menon as James, officer of IB
- Meera Nandan as James' step-sister

=== Happy Journey ===
- Jagathy Sreekumar as 'JK'
- Nithya Menen as a JK's co-passenger
- Bindu Panicker as JK's wife (voice only)
- Mukundan as the journalist
- Mythili as a person in the cafe
- Pradeep Kottayam as a person in the cafe

=== Aviraamam ===
- Siddique as Ravi
- Shweta Menon as Devi, Ravi's wife
- Sudheesh as Jose (Character in segment Nostalgia)

=== Off Season ===
- Suraj Venjaramood as Kunjappayi, a tour guide
- Vindhyan as Razak

=== Bridge ===
- Salim Kumar as Manikandan
- Kalpana as Manikandan's wife
- Kozhikode Shantha Devi as Manikandan's mother
- Jinu Joseph as the father
- Molly Kannamali as Mary

=== Makal ===
- Sona Nair as Sethulekshmi
- Augustine as Sathashivan
- Sreenath as Sajeevan
- Sasi Kalinga as the person who traffics the child

=== Puram Kazhchakal ===
- Mammootty as a passenger in the bus
- Sreenivasan as a writer
- Sshivada as the writer's former lover
- Manikandan Pattambi as the conductor of the bus
- Shalu Kurian as a passenger in the bus

== Themes ==
On a common theme of journeys, each filmmaker presents their cinematic impression of contemporary times in Kerala. The independent narratives integrate when, during these journeys, their characters pass through Kerala Cafe—a quaint railway cafeteria—thereby creating a joint mosaic of issues and impressions.

The project involved ten different cinematographers from the industry. The project features ten different stories from different settings in Kerala, providing ample scope for a diverse bouquet of visual styles. The intersection of the ten stories happens in a railway cafeteria called "Kerala Café", where there is an interaction among the characters of the different stories. This portion was collectively shot by the participating directors and the cinematography was done by Prakash Kutty. Ranjith was the compiler and the producer of the project.

== Soundtrack ==
The only song featured in the film is "Kathayamama, Kathayamama, Kathakalathisadaram", an ode to Thunchath Ezhuthachan's famous verse, shown in the end credits. The lyrics of the song were written by Rafeeq Ahamed and the music was composed by Bijibal, and sung by P. Jayachandran.

== Release ==
The film was released in Abu Dhabi on 9 October 2009. The film released in India on 29 October 2009.

== Reception ==
Critics gave the film generally favourable reviews. Giving it four stars out of five, Nowrunning.com commented: "Open up this box of assorted candies, and you see them all laid out on a salver, quite uneven in manner and matter, posture and perspective and yet it all builds into something quite incredible that makes this ambitious enterprise a fascinating filmic feast." Movie Buzz of Sify.com said, "Here is a film that looks different from the rest and catches the viewers' attention quite easily."

== Legacy ==
Some of the emotional scenes became viral through social media. Also, one of the dialogue by Prithviraj Sukumaran in this film became a subject to trolls and memes in social media.
