= Joshua Newton =

Joshua or Josh Newton may refer to:

- Joshua Newton (writer) (born 1969), Indian writer
- Josh Newton (musician) (born 1973), American musician
- Josh Newton (American football) (born 2000), American football player
