= Ahmed Sidhique =

Indian film actor and screenwriter

- Born: Thiruvananthapuram, Kerala, India
- Occupations: Actor; Screenwriter
- Years active: 2009 – present

Ahmed Sidhique is an Indian actor and writer who mainly works in the Malayalam film industry.

== Career ==
He debuted in 2009 by penning the screenplay for Uday Ananthan's Mrityunjayam which is the fourth segment in the movie Kerala Cafe. He was noted for the role of K. T. Mirash in the movie Salt N' Pepper. He also played the role of a close aide of Nivin Pauly in the movie Thattathin Marayathu. He has written the screenplay for the Aashiq Abu directed movie Gangster starring Mammootty.

== Filmography ==
=== As an actor ===
Year	Title	Role	Notes
2011	Salt N' Pepper	K. T. Mirash	
2012	Thattathin Marayathu	Mustafa	
2013	Left Right Left	Jason Fernandez	
2014	Praise the Lord	Samkutty	
2015	You Too Brutus	Arun	
2015	KL 10 Patthu	Roshan alias Kunjany	
2016	White	Georgy	
2019	Kakshi: Amminippilla	Shajith Kumar 'Amminippilla'	
2019	Manoharam	Vijay	
2025	Cherukkanum Pennum		

=== As screenwriter ===
Year	Film	Direction
2009	Mrityunjayam Segment in Kerala Cafe	Uday Ananthan
2014	Gangster	Aashiq Abu

=== Short films ===
Year	Title	Character	Director
2016	Thavidupodi Jeevitham	Satheeshan	Mithun Chandran
