= Gangster (2014 film) =

- Theatrical poster
- Directed by: Aashiq Abu
- Written by: Ahmed Sidhique; Abhilash S. Kumar
- Produced by: Aashiq Abu
- Starring: Mammootty
- Cinematography: Alby
- Edited by: Saiju Sreedharan
- Music by: Deepak Dev
- Production company: OPM
- Distributed by: Aan Mega Media (America)
- Release date: 11 April 2014
- Country: India
- Language: Malayalam

Gangster is a 2014 Malayalam language action drama film directed by Aashiq Abu. The film stars Mammootty in the lead role and Sekhar Menon in a supporting role. Written by Ahmed Sidhique and Abhilash S. Kumar, the film features music by Deepak Dev. Released on 12 April 2014, it generated negative reviews from critics and was a box office failure.

== Premise ==
Akbar Ali Khan is a powerful crime boss in Mangalore underworld and shares his business with two other prominent kingpins, Samuel Pandhare alias Uncle Sam and Mani Menon. Under their rule, the city remains calm, until Anto, the grandson of Uncle Sam and a drug baron, decides to import contaminated drug vaccines from abroad to sell them at a very high rate. But Akbar opposes the plan, and Anto tries to kill Akbar. The plan fails when Akbar's wife, Sana, dies and Akbar gets brutally injured. He is saved by his uncle, Hajikka, who helps him to take revenge, with the help of Vithura, Hajikka's henchmen, and Akbar's lieutenant, Michael. Akbar kills Uncle Sam and Mani. He finally finds out through Vithura that Anto is hiding in a beach resort at Goa with a group of Russian mobsters. Though injured, Akbar kills the Russians and eventually, Anto using a machete.

== Cast ==
- Mammootty as Akbar Ali Khan
- Sekhar Menon as Anto Pandhare
- John Paul as Samuel "Uncle Sam" Pandhare
- Kunchan as Mani Menon
- T. G. Ravi as Hajikka
- Nyla Usha as Sana Ibrahim
- Aparna Gopinath as Lilly
- Alexx O'Nell as Tom
- Hareesh Peradi as Michael
- Dileesh Pothan as DYSP Vithura Chengalath
- Binu Pappu as Tony Varghese
- Prakash Varma as Opening Narrator

== Production ==
=== Casting ===
The film was expected to have Fahadh Faasil and Meera Jasmine or Rima Kallingal to play major roles with Mammootty. Later, Nyla Usha was cast to play the female lead opposite Mammootty. Also, Aparna Gopinath was roped in to play another female lead. Mammootty reportedly had lost 10 kg to play the role of Akbar Ali Khan in the film. The film also features John Paul, T. G. Ravi, Sekhar Menon, Kunchan, Hareesh Peradi, Dileesh Pothan, and Alexx O'Nell in supporting roles.

=== Filming ===
Gangster was scheduled to be shot after the completion of Aashiq Abu's Salt N' Pepper, but was postponed several times to finally start shooting from 15 December 2013. The movie completed shooting in 50 days in the locations of Kochi, Mangalore, Goa, and Rajasthan, at a budget of ₹8 crore (US$830,000).

In an online poll conducted by One India, Gangster was voted as the most awaited Malayalam film of the year.

== Release ==
The film was released on 11 April as a Vishu release with the date being adjusted due to national elections.

== Reception ==
=== Critical reception ===
The film received highly negative reviews from critics.

Veeyen of Nowrunning.com rated the film 2 out of 5 and said, "The even sag that painfully persists throughout, the mindless gunshots and blood splatter and the sodden predictability together blow up this film beyond recognition. And no amount of crashing and crunching can salvage an entertainer from the massive debris that it leaves behind." Raj Vikram of Metromatinee.com said, "Gangster proves to be a half baked, shoddily made and unimaginative film. Without a speck of novelty it ends up as a routine revenge drama devoid of thrills. Painfully paced and lacking in an engaging plot the film huffs and puffs into a disappointing end".

Padmakumar of Malayala Manorama rated the film 1.5 out of 5 and concluded his review saying, "With all its thunderous background score, dramatic slow motions, white-skinned cons, wowing locations, flamboyant frames and sleek cars, the film never fails from disappointing you to the core." Tony Mathew, also from Malayala Manorama, gave the movie a negative review and said that "Gangster is a disaster".

Ajin Krishna of Oneindia.in said, "The movie Gangster works only for its different style, performances, music, visuals and the engaging climax sequences. Rest is pretty much average." Sify.com's reviewer said, "Gangster is perhaps an act of impudence, with scant regard for the time and money of the viewer. It's not easy to sit through this boring film even for a hardcore Mammootty fan."
