= Kalasangham Films =

Indian film production company

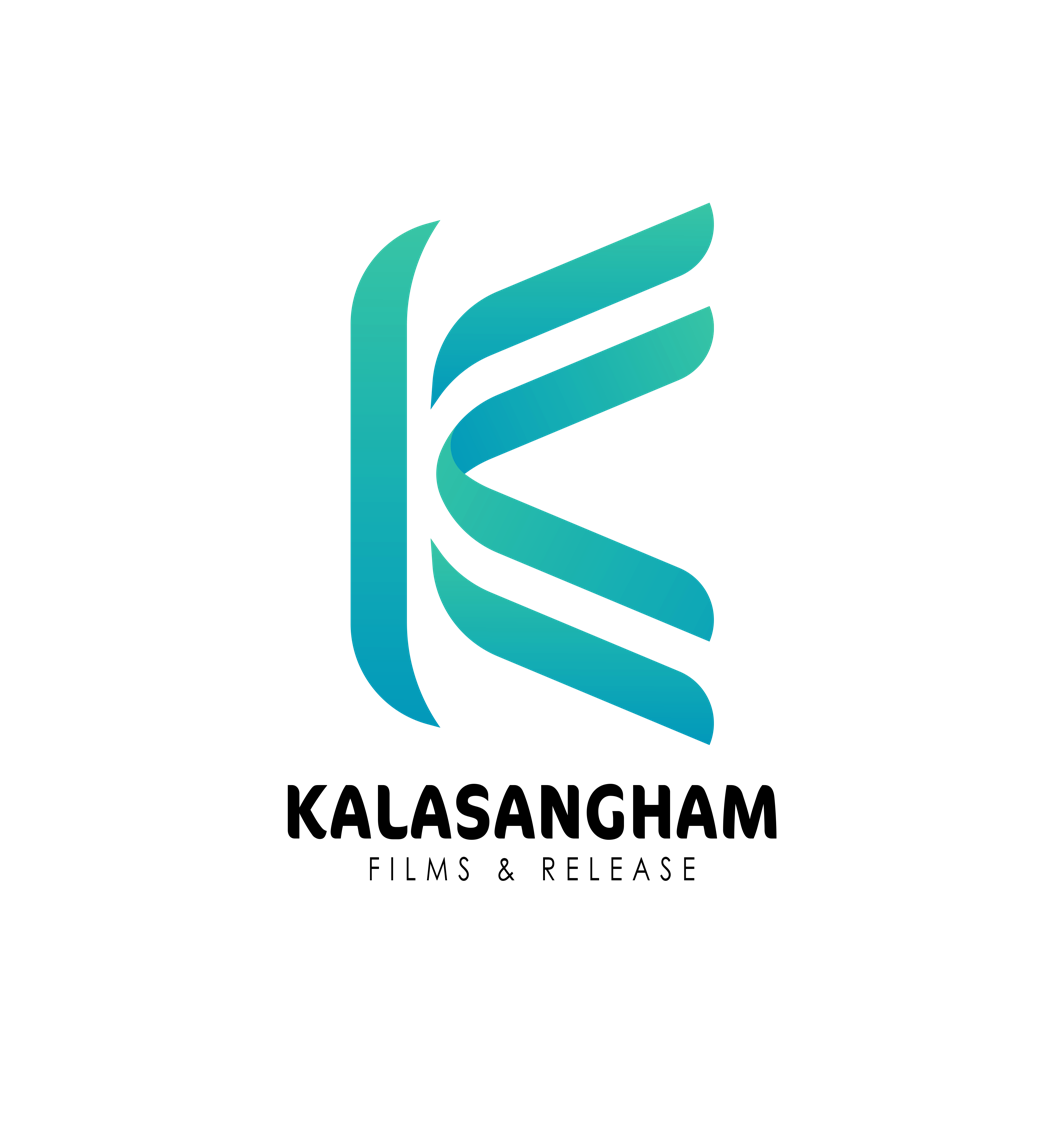
- Type: Private
- Industry: Entertainment; Motion picture
- Founded: 2001; 25 years ago
- Founder: M. M. Hamsa
- Headquarters: Kottayam, India
- Products: Films

Kalasangham Films is an Indian film production and distribution company based in the Malayalam film industry. It was founded by M. M. Hamsa. It has since gone on to distribute several films in Malayalam and other regional Indian languages.

== Productions ==
No.	Film	Year	Director	Other notes
1	Ee Parakkum Thalika	2001	Thaha	It was also remade as Aaduthu Paaduthu in Telugu, Sundara Travels in Tamil and Dakota Express in Kannada.
2	Vinodayathra	2007	Sathyan Anthikkad	
3	Bhagyadevatha	2009	Sathyan Anthikkad	Asianet Film Award for Honour Special Jury (2010)

== Distributions ==
Year	Film	Director
2001	Ee Parakkum Thalika	Thaha
2002	Meesa Madhavan	Lal Jose
2002	Bagavathi	A. Venkatesh
2002	Nandanam	Ranjith
2003	Mutham	S. A. Chandrasekhar
2003	C.I.D. Moosa	Johny Antony
2003	Pattalam	Lal Jose
2004	Whistle	J. D.- Jerry
2004	Kuthu	A. Venkatesh
2004	The Spy Who Loved Me	Lewis Gilbert
2004	Rain Rain Come Again	Jayaraj
2004	Madhurey	Ramana Madhesh
2004	Shock	Thiagarajan
2004	Kathavasheshan	T. V. Chandran
2004	Dreams	Kasthuri Raja
2004	Uyarangalil	I. V. Sasi
2004	Rasikan	Lal Jose
2005	Ji	N. Linguswamy
2005	Pandippada	Rafi Mecartin
2006	Lion	Joshiy
2006	Chess	Raj Babu
2006	Species III	Brad Turner
2006	The Don	Shaji Kailas
2006	Pakal	M. A. Nishad
2007	Vinodayathra	Sathyan Anthikkad
2007	Subhadram	Sreelal Devaraj
2007	Vel	Hari
2008	Novel	East Coast Vijayan
2008	Maisamma IPS	Bharath Parepalli
2008	Aandavan	Akbar Jose
2008	Twenty:20	Joshiy
2009	Aayirathil Oruvan	Sibi Malayil
2009	Bhagyadevatha	Sathyan Anthikkad
2009	Kadhal Kadhai	Velu Prabhakaran
2009	Patham Nilayile Theevandi	Joshy Mathew
2010	Aagathan	Kamal
2010	Goa	Venkat Prabhu
2010	Paappi Appacha	Mamas
2010	Angadi Theru	Vasanthabalan
2010	Malarvadi Arts Club	Vineeth Sreenivasan
2011	The Metro	Bipin Prabhakar
2011	Aadukalam	Vetrimaran
2011	Race	Kukku Surendran
2011	Seedan	Subramaniam Siva
2011	Janapriyan	Boban Samuel
2011	Badrinath	V. V. Vinayak
2011	Vaanam	Krish
2011	Adaminte Makan Abu	Salim Ahamed
2011	100% Love	Sukumar
2011	Orma Mathram	Madhu Kaithapram
2012	Ordinary	Sugeeth
2012	Mayamohini	Jose Thomas
2012	Vaadhyar	Nidheesh Sakthi
2012	Naughty Professor	Hari Narayanan
2012	Akasathinte Niram	Dr. Biju
2012	Gajapokkiri	Trivikram Srinivas
2012	Naan	Jeeva Shankar
2012	Thiruthani	Perarasu
2012	Chettayees	Shajoon Kariyal
2013	Housefull	Linson Antony
2013	Kutteem Kolum	Guinness Pakru
2013	Sound Thoma	Vyshakh
2013	Choodan	Srinu Vaitla
2013	Honey Bee	Lal Jr.
2013	Kunjananthante Kada	Salim Ahamed
2013	Ezhamathe Varavu	Hariharan
2013	Pattam Pole	Alagappan N
2013	Escape from Uganda	Rajesh Nair
2014	Mannar Mathai Speaking 2	Mamas
2014	To Noora with Love	Babu Narayanan
2014	Arima Nambi	Anand Shankar
2014	Velaiilla Pattadhari	Velraj
2014	Jigarthanda	Karthik Subbaraj
2014	Irumbu Kuthirai	Yuvaraj Bose
2014	Madras	Pa. Ranjith
2015	Kappal	Karthik G. Krish
2015	You Too Brutus	Roopesh Peethambaran
2015	Chandrettan Evideya	Sidharth Bharathan
2015	Saigal Padukayanu	Sibi Malayil
2015	Salt Mango Tree	Rajesh Nair
2015	Anarkali	Sachy
2016	Pugazh	Manimaran
2016	Valleem Thetti Pulleem Thetti	Rishi Sivakumar
2016	Oru Murai Vanthu Parthaya	Sajan K. Mathew
2016	Pencil	Mani Nagaraj
2016	Pinneyum	Adoor Gopalakrishnan
2016	Kattappanayile Rithwik Roshan	Nadirsha
2017	Jomonte Suvisheshangal	Sathyan Anthikad
2017	Ayal Jeevichirippundu	Vyasan K. P.
2017	Lakshyam	Anzar Khan
2017	Thondimuthalum Driksakshiyum	Dileesh Pothan
2017	Lavakusha	Gireesh Mano
2017	Njanum Ente Sreeyum	Venu Sri Ram
2017	Aana Alaralodalaral	Dileep Mohan
2018	Carbon	Venu
2018	Kammara Sambhavam	Rathish Ambat
2018	Aravindante Athidhikal	M. Mohanan
2018	Njan Prakashan	Sathyan Anthikad
2019	An International Local Story	Harisree Ashokan
2019	And The Oscar Goes To...	Salim Ahamed
2019	My Santa	Sugeeth
2022	Ullasam	Jeevan Jojo
2023	Pachuvum Athbutha Vilakkum	Akhil Sathyan
