= Pranayakalam =

2007 Indian Malayalam romantic film

- Directed by: Uday Ananthan
- Written by: Uday Ananthan
- Produced by: AVA Productions
- Starring: Ajmal Ameer; Vimala Raman
- Cinematography: Jibu Jacob; Loganathan Srinivasan
- Edited by: L. Bhoominathan
- Music by: Ouseppachan
- Distributed by: Century Release
- Release date: 8 June 2007
- Country: India
- Language: Malayalam

Pranayakalam (English: Season of Love) is a 2007 Indian Malayalam romantic film written and directed by débutant Uday Ananthan, starring Ajmal Ameer and Vimala Raman.

== Cast ==
- Ajmal Ameer as Renjith (voiceover by Sarath Das)
- Vimala Raman as Maria Varghese (voiceover by Sreeja Ravi)
- Jithu Johny Panjikkaran as Deepu
- Murali as ASI Stephen Varghese
- Seema as Anna
- Balachandra Menon as Balan
- Thilakan as Krishnankutty
- Madhu Warrier as Narayanan
- Vipin Atley as Ranjith's friend
- Baburaj as Gunda
- Lakshmy Ramakrishnan as Rajani
- Sruthi Nair (Devika Rani) as Neethu
- Anoop Menon as doctor

== Music ==
The music for the film was composed by Ouseppachan. The lyrics were written by Rafeeq Ahamed, who won the Kerala State Film Award for Best Lyricist for his work in the film. All the songs from the movie became popular especially "Oru Venalppuzhayil", which became hugely popular among youngsters.

- "Thulaseedala" - K. J. Yesudas
- "Anthinilaavinte" - Kalyani Menon
- "Ente Daivame" (F) - Sujatha Mohan
- "Ente Daivame" (M) - Vidhu Prathap
- "Etho Vidooramaam" - K. S. Chitra
- "Kari Raavin" - Franco, Sayanora Philip
- "Oru Venalppuzhayil" - Ranjith K. Govind
- "Parayu Prabhaathame" - Gayathri Asokan
- "Theme Song" - Ouseppachan

== Reception ==
A critic from Sify rated the film three out of five stars and wrote, "On the whole Pranayakalam, could have been a far more convincing and touching if the director and his script writer had done their home work." Paresh C. Palicha of Rediff.com gave the film two out of five stars and wrote, "The film opens and you are transported two decades. So far so good. Then comes the bummer, this film, you realise, is just another ordinary love story. Nothing more, nothing less."
