= Lavender (2015 film) =

- Theatrical poster
- Directed by: Altas T. Ali
- Written by: Anoop Menon
- Produced by: Jimmy Mathew; Sanath Welgate; Biju Rawthar; Betty
- Starring: Rahman; Elham Mirza; Nishan; Anoop Menon; Aju Varghese; Kalpana; Govind Padmasoorya
- Cinematography: Binendra Menon; Khalid Mohtaseb; Jonathan Bregel
- Edited by: Renjith Touchriver
- Music by: Deepak Dev
- Release date: June 26, 2015 (India)
- Country: India
- Language: Malayalam

Lavender is a 2015 Malayalam-language romantic action film directed by Altas T. Ali and written by Anoop Menon. The film stars Rahman, Nishan, Anoop Menon, Govind Padmasoorya, Aju Varghese, and Thalaivasal Vijay. Iranian theater artiste Elham Mirza debut as the heroine in the film. The film is shot mostly in Thailand. It was released on 26 June 2015. The movie is loosely based on the Korean movie Daisy.

== Plot ==
The film is a scenic depiction of the script written by Kabir Abbas as he narrates the story to his friend, (Elham Mirza).

The story is happens in Bangkok where Isha is an artist who sketches live. Ayaan is a resident who migrated in a fake name. He surprises Isha with a bunch of lavender flowers in between. Incidentally, Isha befriends Siddharth and mistakes him to be the person sending her lavenders.

Isha had once been rescued and taken to hospital after she had fallen off a wooden bridge by someone whose identity is not known to her. Since then, she is in search of that person without knowing that it is the same person who sends her the lavender flower bouquets. When Isha tells that it is Siddharth who sends her the flowers, Siddharth doesn't bother to deny it, leaving her to believe that it is Siddharth, the person she was searching for. Siddharth reveals himself as a designer working in a graphic company. Matters get worse when Siddharth is shot on a public place when he is with Isha. She also gets shot in her throat and is left there. Ayaan rushes to the spot and takes her to the hospital. She recovers, however, her voice is lost.

Ayaan then befriends Isha. However, Isha reveals that she is already in love with Siddharth. They both then trace Siddharth, however, do not find him. A recovered Siddharth, revealed to us as an Interpol officer, is being advised by his senior, Raghavan, to forget his love and carry on with his duty. On her birthday, Ayaan visits Isha, and at the same time, Siddharth also visits her and reveals to her the truth that he is an Interpol officer and has been cheating on her. He also notices Ayaan present there.

Based on orders from his boss, Joseph Tharakan, Ayaan sets out to kill Siddharth. Despite having an opportunity to shoot Siddharth, Ayaan reveals to him that Isha still loves him, and he will move out of their life. However, then Siddharth is shot to death. Isha is upset about hearing Siddharth's death and is consoled by Ayaan. Joseph assigns Ayaan to kill Raghavan. Ayaan is not willing to take it up. But as Joseph promises that it will be his last execution, and after that, Ayaan will be free to live his own life, he takes up the task. Isha finds the photo of Siddharth and a gun in a briefcase at Ayaan's home. She concludes that Ayaan is the murderer of Siddharth and blames him for doing the same. Grief-stricken, Ayaan surrenders to the Interpol. Eventually, Isha discovers the truth and rushes to have a glance at Ayaan. She dies while protecting Ayaan from a bullet. Ayaan clears Joseph and his colleagues and falls dead.

The narration ends there, and Kabir bids farewell to his friend. Later, he is surprised to see a bunch of lavender flowers on his doorstep.

== Cast ==
- Rahman as Ayaan/Ajay
- Elham Mirza as Isha
- Nishan as Siddarth
- Anoop Menon as Raghavan Moorthy
- Govind Padmasoorya as Kabir Abbas
- Aju Varghese as Raju
- Thalaivasal Vijay as Joseph Tharakan
- Delhi Ganesh as Isha's grandfather
- Kalpana as Janet
- Sudipto Balav as Sunny Tharakan

== Promotion ==
Tamil actor Suriya promoted the film in the audio launch function held in Lulu Mall, Kochi on 24 May 2015.

== Soundtrack ==
The soundtrack for the film was composed by Deepak Dev, and the lyrics were penned by Rafeeq Ahamed.

List of music/songs for the film
No.	Title	Singer(s)	Lyricist	Composer	Notes
1	"Cherathe"	Siddharth Mahadevan	Rafeeq Ahamed	Deepak Dev	
2	"Anaadhi Yugangallai"	Vijay Yesudas	Rafeeq Ahamed	Deepak Dev	
3	"Pulari Manjin"	Kavya Ajit, Ajmal	Rafeeq Ahamed	Deepak Dev	
4	"She's So Beautiful"	Kavya Ajit, Amal Antony	Rafeeq Ahamed	Deepak Dev	
5	"Promo Song"	—N/a	Vairamuthu	A. R. Rahman	Contains Tamil lyrics
