= Apoorvaragam =

2010 film by Sibi Malayil

- Theatrical poster
- Directed by: Sibi Malayil
- Written by: G. S. Anand; Najeem Koya
- Produced by: Siyad Koker
- Starring: Nishan; Nithya Menon; Asif Ali; Vinay Forrt
- Cinematography: Ajayan Vincent
- Edited by: Bijith Bala
- Music by: Vidyasagar
- Production company: Kokers Films
- Distributed by: Sree Gokulam Films
- Release date: 16 July 2010
- Running time: 152 minutes
- Country: India
- Language: Malayalam

Apoorvaragam (transl. Rare Melody) is a 2010 Malayalam-language romantic crime thriller film written by G. S. Anand and Najeem Koya and directed by Sibi Malayil. The film stars Nishan, Asif Ali, Vinay Forrt, and Nithya Menon. It was released on 16 July 2010 across 42 theaters in Kerala.

The film became a box-office hit and had an over 50-day theatre run in Kerala. It was Santosh Jogi's last movie and was released after his death in April 2010. It was later dubbed into Telugu as 50% Love.

== Plot ==
Apoorvaragam is the story of three youngsters Roopesh, Nancy, and Tommy. Roopesh has always been in love with Nancy but has never had the nerve to express it. For Nancy, love is something that is beyond words. Tommy is the perfect Cupid who would make things happen for these two. Slowly, Roopesh and Nancy fall in love. Behind their backs, Tommy calls Nancy's father and informs him that his daughter is dating someone from the college. Her daddy trusts her and so does not take this seriously at first. But later when he grows more suspicious, he decides to marry her to someone he knows.

Nancy and Roopesh register their marriage. Tommy makes another call to her father and informs him that his daughter has gotten married. Her father, after verifying this information, comes and meets Roopesh. He tells Roopesh that he is ready to give any amount to him to withdraw from the relationship. Roopesh tells him he is not in love with Nancy and is only doing this for money. Roopesh demands Rs. 1 crore to back out from the relationship to which Nancy's father agrees.

Roopesh, Tommy, and their third companion, Narayanan, are later seen trying to do the same with another rich man's daughter. While the trap is being set, Roopesh gets in touch with Nancy and tells her the truth. He steals their ransom money from their hideout and gives it back to her dad in the hope of reuniting with Nancy. However, Nancy reveals that she was only pretending to be in love with him because she wanted the money back and broke his heart in return. She gets engaged to the guy chosen by her father in front of Roopesh.

Tommy and Narayanan follow them back to this place and abduct Roopesh and Nancy. In the fight that follows, Roopesh grabs the gun and shoots Tommy and Narayanan. He then calls Nancy's father to come and pick her up. When she is about to leave, Roopesh bids her adieu and shoots himself. Nancy cries out loud suggesting that she was in love with Roopesh.

== Cast ==
- Nishan as Roopesh (voiceover by Sarath Das)
- Asif Ali as Tomy,The Main Antagonist
- Nithya Menen as Nancy
- Vinay Forrt as Narayanan, secondary antagonist
- Abhishek Raveendran as Firoz
- Jagathy Sreekumar as Adv. Bernard
- Sankar Guru Raja as Philipose Melipra (voiceover by Shammi Thilakan)
- Hima Shankar
- Santhosh Jogi as Sethu
- Aneesh G Menon
- Dora Jose as Aisha
- Shruthy Menon as Shikha Damodar

== Soundtrack ==
Apoorvaragam

Soundtrack album by Vidyasagar
- Released: 28 June 2010
- Recorded: Varsha Vallaki Studios
- Genre: Feature film Soundtrack
- Language: Malayalam
- Producer: Vidyasagar

Vidyasagar chronology
Paappi Appacha (2010)	Apoorvaragam (2010)	Mandhira Punnagai (2010)

The songs were composed by Vidyasagar with lyrics penned by Santhosh Varma. The film score was composed by Bijibal.

No.	Title	Performer(s)	Length
1.	"Noolilla Pattangal"	Ranjith Govind, Benny Dayal, Devanand, Naveen Anand, Cicily, Suchithra
2.	"Maanathe"	Karthik, Ranjith Govind, Yasir
3.	"Aathira"	Soumya Ramakrishnan

== See also ==
- For the 1975 film directed by K. Balachander, Apoorva Raagangal
