= Chotta Mumbai =

- Re-release poster
- Directed by: Anwar Rasheed
- Written by: Benny P. Nayarambalam
- Produced by: Maniyanpilla Raju; Ajayachandran Nair; Raghuchandran Nair
- Starring: Mohanlal; Siddique; Kalabhavan Mani; Jagathy Sreekumar; Indrajith Sukumaran; Manikkuttan; Bijukuttan
- Narrated by: Mohanlal
- Cinematography: Alagappan N.
- Edited by: Don Max
- Music by: Rahul Raj
- Production company: Sree Bhadra Pictures
- Distributed by: Vaishakha Release
- Release date: 7 April 2007
- Running time: 137 minutes
- Country: India
- Language: Malayalam

Chotta Mumbai (transl. Little Mumbai) is a 2007 Indian Malayalam-language action comedy drama film directed by Anwar Rasheed, written by Benny P. Nayarambalam, and co-produced by Maniyanpilla Raju. The film stars Mohanlal in the lead role with Siddique, Kalabhavan Mani, Jagathy Sreekumar, Indrajith Sukumaran, Manikuttan, Bijukuttan, Sai Kumar, and Bhavana in supporting roles. Debutant Rahul Raj composed the score and songs of the film. The plot follows Vasco da Gama (Thala) and his gang of friends, all unemployed and leading a happy-go-lucky life until they encounter a corrupt police officer and gangster, Nadeshan.

The film was a major box-office success and became a cult classic over the years leaving a lasting impact on Kerala's popular cinema. Widely regarded as one of the most entertaining ventures in Mohanlal's career, the film continues to be celebrated for its iconic dialogues, characters and Rahul Raj's soundtrack.

A digitally remastered 4K Dolby Atmos version of Chotta Mumbai was released theatrically on 6 June 2025.

== Plot ==
Vasco da Gama (Mohanlal) is a charming but aimless small-time gang leader in Fort Kochi, affectionately called "Thala" by his loyal friends—Mullan Chandrappan (Siddique), Padakkam Basheer (Jagathy Sreekumar), Tomichan (Indrajith Sukumaran), Sainu (Manikuttan), and Susheelan (Bijukuttan). The gang spends their days pulling off petty scams, often targeting tourists in their neighborhood, known as Chotta Mumbai. Their carefree existence is disrupted when they fall victim to a visa fraud, losing their savings to a conman (Cochin Haneefa) who deceives them with fake visas for overseas jobs. Desperate to recover the money, Vasco secretly mortgages his family home, risking the wrath of his father, Michael Asan (Sai Kumar), a retired wrestler and respected community figure.

Meanwhile, Michael arranges Vasco’s marriage to Latha (Bhavana), a spirited auto-rickshaw driver nicknamed "Parakkum Latha." However, Latha confesses to Vasco that she plans to elope with her boyfriend, Suni (Suraj Venjaramoodu). Vasco agrees to help, but the plan falls apart when Latha discovers Suni’s deceitful nature. This revelation brings Vasco and Latha closer, with Latha beginning to see the goodness beneath his roguish exterior.

The story takes a darker turn when Vasco, Michael, and Latha witness the murder of an honest police officer, Mohandas (Vijayaraghavan), by Satheesan (Vinayakan), the brother of corrupt CI Nadesan (Kalabhavan Mani). To protect Satheesan, Nadesan frames Tomichan for the murder, exploiting his vulnerabilities. When Nadesan betrays Tomichan, he is arrested, and Nadesan turns his vengeance on Vasco’s gang.

As tensions escalate, Vasco faces mounting crises: the bank threatens to seize his home, leading to a bitter confrontation with Michael, while Nadesan’s threats put his friends and family in danger. The climax unfolds during the Cochin Carnival, an event organized by Michael, where Vasco and his gang devise a clever plan to outsmart Nadesan and expose his crimes. In a chaotic and action-packed finale, Vasco brutally beats up Nadeshan and his goons, clears Tomichan’s name, reconciles with his father, and saves his home, restoring his family’s honor.

== Cast ==
- Mohanlal as Vasco da Gama a.k.a. Thala
- Siddique as Mullan Chandrappan, Thala's friend and sidekick
- Jagathy Sreekumar as Padakkam Basheer, Thala's friend and fellow goon
- Kalabhavan Mani as CI Nadesan, a corrupt police officer and the main antagonist
- Indrajith Sukumaran as Tomichan, Thala's younger cousin brother and sidekick
- Manikuttan as Sainu, Thala's friend and sidekick
- Bijukuttan as Susheelan, Thala's friend and sidekick
- Bhavana as Latha, Thala's girlfriend turned wife
- Sai Kumar as Pehlwan Michael Aashan, Thala's father
- Rajan P. Dev as Pambu Chackochan, Latha's father and Michael's longtime friend
- Vinayakan as Satheeshan, Nadeshan's younger brother and secondary antagonist
- Maniyanpilla Raju as Advocate Pradeep Menon
- Mallika Sukumaran as Rosily, Tomichan's mother and Thala's aunt
- Suraj Venjaramoodu as Mama Suni, Latha's ex-boyfriend
- Cochin Haneefa as Vasuttan, Susheelan's cousin
- Bheeman Raghu as CI Alexander, Nadeshan's associate
- Vijayaraghavan as CI Mohandas
- Baburaj as Bhargavan, Satheeshan's henchman
- Jasper as Sebbatti, Thala's rival
- Sanusha as Daisy, Tomichan's sister
- Thara as Rachel, Thala's sister
- Saranya Sasi as Sherin, Thala's sister
- Geetha Vijayan as Bhama, Pradeep's wife
- Ramu as DGP Rajendran Nair IPS
- Kunchan as Philipose, announcer at the carnival
- Narayanankutty as Nanappan, Basheer's rival
- Santhosh Jogi as Shaji, Nadeshan's henchmen
- Biju Pappan as SI Hameed, Nadeshan's associate
- Kalabhavan Haneef as Kunjoonju, broker
- Kochu Preman as Premachandran, Banker
- Nisha Sarang as Saritha, Nadeshan's wife
- Vijayakumari as Nadeshan's Mother
- Shakeela as herself (cameo appearance)
- Rachana Maurya as a dancer in the song Vasco da gama (cameo appearance)
- Martin Prakkat as the north Indian of Gujarath man killed by Satheeshan

== Production ==
Jayasurya was cast in a role, but he had to opt out due to scheduling conflicts with Kangaroo (2007). The role later went to Indrajith.

== Music ==
Chotta Mumbai

Soundtrack album by Rahul Raj
- Released: March 2007
- Studios: Lal Media, Kochi; Krishna DigiDesign; Marian Digital, Chennai; SS Digital, Trivandrum
- Genre: Film soundtrack
- Length: 25:20
- Label: Satyam Audios

Rahul Raj chronology
Chotta Mumbai (2007)	Time (2007)

Composer Rahul Raj made his feature film debut through this film. The songs Thalaa and Vasco da Gama became chartbusters on release followed by the melody Poonila Mazha nanayum. The soundtrack album became a pop culture phenomenon over the years.

The Chettikulangara remix too earned fanfare. Before producing the remix, the rights for the old song were acquired for a price of ₹ 2.5 lakhs.

Track	Song title	Singer(s)	Lyricist	Notes
1	"Vasco da Gama"	Afsal, Rimi Tomy, Vipin Xavier	Sarath Vayalar	Carnival song in the climax
2	"Poonila"	Sangeeth S, Sangeetha Prabhu	Santhosh Varma	Raga: Kalyani, Sindhu Bhairavi; Not picturised
3	"Thala"	Shankar Mahadevan, Arjun Sasi, Sangeeth S, Rahul Raj	Sarath Vayalar	Highlighting the lead character Thala
4	"Chettikulangara"	M. G. Sreekumar, Sayanora Philip	Sreekumaran Thampi, Sarath Vayalar	Mohanlal's intro song Cover version of yesteryear song composed by M. K. Arjunan
5	"Chotta Mumbai"	Rahul Raj, Sreerag, Sreelakshmi	Sarath Vayalar	Title song. Showing the life of Chotta Mumbai gang.
6	"Chettikulangara (Tell Me Now)"	M. G. Sreekumar, Sayanora Philip	Sreekumaran Thampi, Sarath Vayalar	Not picturised

== Release ==
Chotta Mumbai 101 days success poster

The film was released on 7 April 2007 across 60 screens in Kerala, the biggest release for a Malayalam film. A digitally remastered 4K Dolby Atmos version was released theatrically on 6 June 2025.

=== Critical reception ===
The film was well received by critics. Unni R. Nair, in his review for Nowrunning.com said, "An out and out entertainer, it's a film that you would like to just sit back and enjoy, pushing all logical thinking to the background. Chotta Mumbai is a film that cashes in on Mohanlal's superstar image and its aim is merely to entertain and enthrall." Paresh C Palicha of Rediff.com gave the film a rating and positively reviewed the film's script, Mohanlal's lead performance, Anwar Rasheed's direction as well as the performances of the supporting cast. Sify.com also published an extremely positive review and said: "What makes the film tick is Mohanlal's at the heart of this mad, mad, mad world with his impeccable sense of comic timing. Clearly, he is at home playing this type of character- for him, it is the equivalent of an old pair of Hawai slippers. If laughter is the best medicine then Anwar Rasheed has earned his stripes yet again."

=== Box office ===
The film was a blockbuster at the box office and became one of the top five highest-grossing Malayalam films of the year. It ran for over 101 days in theatres. The re-released version grossed ₹3.78 crore worldwide in 10 days with a limited release.

== Legacy ==
On its original release, the movie was popular with audiences for its humour, pacing, and Mohanlal’s performance as Vasco da Gama—a rogue from Fort Kochi. Upon its original release, Chotta Mumbai received positive reviews for its humour, fast-paced narrative, and Mohanlal’s charismatic performance. The film became a commercial hit, running over 100 days in theatres and securing its place among the top earners of the year. Nearly two decades on, it enjoys cult status, with its dialogues, characters, and Rahul Raj's soundtrack remaining popular among fans.

The film re-released in theaters on June 6, 2025 to massive fanfare. Videos of fans dancing in theatres to the film’s songs went viral on Instagram. Onmanorama wrote, "More than just a commercial success, the re-release of 'Chotta Mumbai' shows how certain films transcend time. With Mohanlal’s charm, Anwar Rasheed’s dynamic storytelling, and a soundtrack that still gets people on their feet, the movie continues to hold a special place in Malayalam pop culture".
