= Harimurali =

Indian actor (1998–2026)

- Born: 1998
- Died: 12 March 2026 (aged 27–28)
- Occupation: Actor

Harimurali (1998 – 12 March 2026) was an Indian Malayalam actor. He started as a child actor, who acted in Rasikan (2004), Annan Thampi, and Madambi (both 2008).

== Life and career ==
Harimurali was born in Annoor in Payyannur, Kannur district, in 1998. He was known as Appus. His father, KU Murali, was also a film actor and was popularly known as Payyannur Murali, and his mother was Prasanna. He had a brother, Sreemurali.

He also acted in Ulakam Chuttum Valiban, The Don, Ee Pattanathil Bhootam, and 2 Harihar Nagar, and also had a small role in the 2015 film Amar Akbar Anthony, starring Prithviraj Sukumaran. In Annan Thampi, he co-starred with Mammootty in 2008.

Harimurali was found dead at his home in Payyannur on 12 March 2026, and his body was later moved to a hospital for tests. He was 27. It was reported he had committed suicide.
