= Nishan Nanaiah =

Indian film actor

- Born: K. P. Nishan Nanaiah; 7 December 1985 (age 40); Coorg, Karnataka, India
- Occupations: Actor; model
- Years active: 2009–present

Kallichanda Prasad Nishan Nanaiah, also credited as Nishan, is an Indian actor who works in Malayalam, Hindi, Bengali, Kannada, Tamil and Telugu films. Born in Coorg, Karnataka and brought up in Calcutta, Nishan is a graduate of Film and Television Institute of India, Pune.

== Personal life ==
Born Kallichanda Prasad Nishan Nanaiah, Nishan was born to Kallichanda Somaiah Prasad (K. S. Prasad) a customs and central excise officer, and late K. Padma Prasad, in Coorg, Karnataka. He was brought up in Kolkata, West Bengal. He was a professional tennis player, who represented Calcutta University and played many All India and National tournaments. He did his graduation in Mass communication from St. Xavier’s College, Kolkata and post graduation (in acting) from the Pune Film Institute (FTII). Nishan speaks six languages, and is very good at picking up languages and dialects.

== Career ==
Nishan debuted in the Hindi film Cycle Kick (Produced by Subhash Ghai), which did not have a theatrical release. It was sent to film festivals and then had a staggered release. Its rights were later acquired by Zee Entertainment and the film was subsequently shown on Zee Cinemas. It is presently available to watch on Zee5. He then got a career break in legendary director Shyamaprasad's Malayalam film Ritu in 2009, (for which he also received great critical acclaim as well as won his Best Debut award), along with a Telugu release Manorama in the same year, opposite lead actress Charmee. He became a notable actor through Sibi Malayil's Apoorvaragam, which was released in 2010, and was one of the biggest commercial hits of that year. It also completed a run of 100 days (which is very rare and a great feat to achieve for a film with newcomers in today's times). Till date Nishan has worked as a leading man in around 15 Malayalam films, 1 Telugu film, 3 Hindi films, 1 Kannada film, 2 Tamil films, 2 Bengali films and a Bengali web series. He is currently shooting for a Hindi feature film Nastik (upcoming film), with Arjun Rampal.

== Alma Mater ==
After graduating, he moved to Mumbai to try his luck in Bollywood. He worked with Subhash Ghai in a film titled Cycle Kick, which was released in 2011. As an actor, he believes in expanding his horizons and hence he decided to venture down south. His first southern break was the Telugu film Manorama (2009). The film, along with Nishan's performance was critically very well acclaimed. His character in the film was noted, however simultaneously. He got a call from legendary Malayalam director Shyamaprasad during those days, for playing the lead role in his film, Ritu (2009). About the selection, the actor said, "Shyamaprasad sir had seen my stills from a model coordinator in Chennai. But I was not sure if I could do the film because Malayalam is a tough language. Shyam sir, however, told me that he was confident that I could do the role." Rithu was a critical hit, which won him the best debut award.

After Ritu, he got another notable role in Sibi Malayil's Apoorvaragam. Apoorvaragam was a sleeper hit. It ran for 100+ days. This movie made Nishan a household name as it was a commercial hit. In February, Ee Adutha Kaalathu released in which he played the role of Rustam. This film received positive response from critics and audiences, and is considered a path-breaker for its bold and realistic narration and the innovative style of weaving story threads together. Nishan's role of Rustam was more appreciated as it had a grey shade. He also starred in Bejoy Nambiar's David alongside Vikram. His role of Peter was appreciated by the critics. His last release was Geethaanjali (Malayalam) directed by Priyadarshan, starring Mohanlal. The film went on to be a semi hit.

Nishan's next release was Badlapur Boys (Hindi), directed by newcomer Shailesh Verma. It is based on the Indian traditional rural sport, kabaddi.

== Filmography ==
Year	Title	Role	Language	Notes
2009	Ritu	Sharath	Malayalam	Debut film
2009	Manorama	Killer	Telugu	
2010	Apoorvaragam	Roopesh	Malayalam	
2010	Soch Lo	Basu	Hindi	
2011	Cycle Kick	Ramu	Hindi	
2011	Gramam / Namma Gramam	Kannan	Tamil; Malayalam	Bilingual film
2011	Note Out	Pavithran	Malayalam	
2011	Ithu Nammude Katha	Santhosh	Malayalam	
2012	Challenge / 120 Minutes / Yaarukku Theriyum	Shakthi	Kannada; Malayalam; Tamil	Trilingual film
2012	Ee Adutha Kalathu	Rustham	Malayalam	
2013	Annum Innum Ennum	Roy	Malayalam	
2013	David	Peter	Hindi	Partially reshot in Tamil under the same title (2013)
2013	10:30 am Local Call	Alby	Malayalam	
2013	Radio	Manu	Malayalam	
2013	Geethaanjali	Anoop	Malayalam	
2014	Badlapur Boys	Vijay Pasi	Hindi	
2015	Lavender	Siddharth	Malayalam	
2017	Hadiya	Brahmanandan	Malayalam	
2018	Lolans		Malayalam	
2018	SIX (6)	Soumyajit Roy	Bengali	Web Series (Hoichoi)
2019	Atithi	Antim/Sayanjit	Bengali	
2019	Filter Coffee Liquor Cha	Subbu	Bengali	Web Film (ZEE5)
2021	Alpha Beta Gamma	Ravi	Hindi	
2021	Chai Shai Biscuit	Himanshu Bhatnagar (director)	Hindi	
2021	Ridicoolas	Mohan	Hindi	Exclusively on Zee5
2021	Nastik		Hindi	
2022	Wedding Gift	Vilas Gowda	Kannada	
2023	Trail of an Assassin	Sreekumar	Hindi	Web Series
2024	Chashma	Supriyo’s father	Hindi	Short film
2024	Alpha Beta Gamma	Raviraj Varma	Hindi	
2024	Kishkindha Kaandam	Sudheer	Malayalam	
2025	Hridayapoorvam	Kiran	Malayalam	

=== Television ===
- 2011 - Vivel Big Break (Surya TV) as Judge (Malayalam)

== Awards ==
- Asianet Film Award for Best New Face (2009)
- Surya Film Award for Best Debutant (2009)
- World Malayalee Council and Kairali TV award for Best Debut (2009)
