= Lolans =

- Directed by: Salim Baba
- Screenplay by: Santhosh Ram
- Story by: K. P. Suneer
- Produced by: K. P. Suneer
- Starring: Nishan; Carolina; P. Balachandran
- Cinematography: Shaji Jacob
- Edited by: K. Sreenivasan
- Music by: Anwar Aman
- Production company: Karuparamban Films
- Release date: 23 March 2018
- Country: India
- Language: Malayalam

Lolans is a 2018 Indian Malayalam-language film directed by Salim Baba and produced by K. P. Suneer. The screenplay was written by Santhosh Ram from a story by Suneer. The film stars Nishan, Carolina, and P. Balachandran in the lead roles along with Kottayam Nazeer, Sasi Kalinga, Sunil Sukhada, Jayan, Balaji, Saju Kodiyan, Spadikam George, Abu Salim, Ambika Mohan, Indrans, Kalarenjini, and Niharika. The music was composed by Anwar Aman.

== Plot ==
The story is based in Areekode village. It revolves around the life of four youngsters, who are unable to express their love. The story goes through each of their love stories and is portrayed in a comedic manner.

== Cast ==
- Nishan
- Carolina
- P. Balachandran
- Kottayam Nazeer
- Kalinga Sasi
- Sunil Sukhada
- Jayan
- Balaji
- Saju Kodiyan
- Spadikam George
- Abu Salim
- Ambika Mohan
- Indrans
- Kalaranjini
- Niharika
- Shiyas Kareem

== Soundtrack ==
The music is composed by Anwar Aman along with Sachin Warrier, Durga Viswanat, Najeem Arshan, Durga Viswanath, Pradeep Babu and Mansoor Ibrahim

- "Ariyathe Ennnil"- Sachin Warrier
- "Paaridamonnake"- Durga Viswanat, Chorus
- "Iiaveyile"- Najeem Arshan, Durga Viswanath
- "Ooru Chuttum"- Pradeep Babu, Mansoor Ibrahim
- "Manjuthulliyo"- Niranj Suresh
- "Ariyathe"- Durga Viswanath
