= Alpha Beta Gamma (film) =

Indian romantic comedy film

- Theatrical release poster
- Directed by: Shankar Srikumar
- Story by: Menka Sharma; Shankar Srikumar
- Produced by: Jithin Raj; Mona Shankar; Thomas Punnoose; Menka Sharma
- Starring: Nishan; Amit Kumar Vashisth; Reena Aggarwal
- Cinematography: Kartik Kumar Bhagat
- Edited by: Mandar M Sawant
- Music by: Biplaab Dutta; Prassanna Vishwanathan
- Production companies: Choti Film Productions; Knownsense Entertainment
- Distributed by: Agastaya Jain (Creators Retina)
- Release dates: 24 November 2021 (IFFI); 8 March 2024
- Running time: 119 minutes
- Country: India
- Language: Hindi

Alpha Beta Gamma is a 2021 Indian Hindi-language romantic comedy film directed by debutant director Shankar Srikumar and starring Nishan, Amit Kumar Vashisth, and Reena Aggarwal. The story and screenplay is written by Menka Sharma and Shankar Srikumar. The film is produced by Jithin Raj, Mona Shankar, Thomas Punnoose, and Menka Sharma. The film is a joint venture between Choti Film Productions and Knownsense Entertainment.

Kartik Kumar Bhagat was the film's cinematographer, and its soundtrack and score are composed by Biplaab Dutta. Background score was done by Prassanna Vishwanathan.

Alpha Beta Gamma was world premiered at the 52nd International Film Festival of India at Goa, in the Indian Panorama feature film segment on 24 November 2021. It's a first and debut for most of the people associated with the film. The film was one of the only two Hindi films to be screened under Indian Panorama in the feature film segment out of 221 applications.

== Plot ==
It unfolds against the backdrop of the COVID-19 pandemic. Mitali, a woman, Chiranjeev, her estranged husband, and Ravi, her boyfriend, are confined in an apartment for 14 days. As they navigate the challenges of lockdown, they discover that letting go may be more difficult than holding on.

== Cast ==
- Nishan Nanaiah as Raviraj Varma
- Amit Kumar Vashisth as Chiranjeev Vashishth/Jai
- Reena Aggarwal as Mitali Chauhan
- Saavi Kundra as Jai's friend, Shekhar
- Hemant Sharma as Watchman Birpal
- Nishikant Joshi as Mr. Fernandes
- Sangeeta Prasad as Mrs. Fernandes
- Aneetha Muraleedharan as Bindu Varma (Ravi's mother)

== Production ==
The project was initially reported in 2020. The film was shot in Pune during the COVID-19 pandemic with limited crew members. Most of the crew and cast are from the Film and Television Institute of India (FTII), Pune.

== Screenings ==
Alpha Beta Gamma was world premiered at 52nd International Film Festival of India in features film category of 'Indian Panorama' section for screening in November. The film also be screened at Cannes Film Festival in Marché du Film held along 2022 edition of the festival on 22 May at Palais des Festivals, where India was announced as the official 'country of honour'.

== Release ==
In February 2024, the trailer was released and the theatrical release of the film was on 8 March 2024. It was released in Mumbai, Delhi, and Pune. The film is distributed by Agastaya Jain (Creators Retina), 70mm Talkies, and Samant Chauhan.

== Reception ==
Abhishek Srivastava of The Times of India gave 3.5/5 stars and wrote, "Alpha Beta Gamma offers immense creative possibilities for both the writer and the filmmaker, and, fortunately, the film succeeds for the most part and remains engaging throughout. Shankar introduces a fresh twist to the classic theme of triangular relationships, relying heavily on how characters respond to various situations. He manages to keep viewers engaged, navigating the complexities adeptly.

Devesh Sharma of Filmfare gave 3.5/5 stars, called it a relationship hurricane and a modern take on urban relationships, and wrote "Alpha Beta Gamma was shot amidst the pandemic with limited resources and that kind of works in the film's favour. The sound design is raw and minimal, and gives the feel of something captured inside an actual apartment, rather than being recreated in a studio. The camerawork helps create the feeling of claustrophobia. The characters and their quarrels, angst, as well as the stories they share with each other seem like something carved from life. The dialogue reeks of real conversations."

== Awards and nominations ==
Award	Date of ceremony	Category
International Film Festival of India	24 November 2021	Feature Film - Indian Panorama
Amerta Festival	24 September 2021	Feature Film
Tasveer South Asian Film Festival	16 November 2022	Feature Film
REAKTOR International Film Festival	19 September 2023	Feature Film
REAKTOR International Film Festival	19 September 2023	Best Actor
