= Cycle Kick =

- Poster
- Directed by: Shashi Sudigala
- Story by: Shashi Sudigala
- Produced by: Subhash Ghai
- Starring: Tom Alter; Nishan; Sunny Hinduja
- Music by: Sanjoy Chowdhury
- Production company: Mukta Searchlight Films
- Release date: 16 June 2011 (Narmad International Film Festival)
- Country: India
- Language: Hindi

Cycle Kick is a 2011 Indian Hindi-language sports drama film directed by Shashi Sudigala starring Tom Alter, Nishan and Sunny Hinduja. The film did not have a theatrical release and was only released in film festivals.

== Cast ==
- Nishan as Ramu
- Sunny Hinduja as Ali
- Tom Alter as football coach
- Dwij Yadav as Deva
- Ishita Sharma
- Girija Oak as Shrishti
- Gurmeet Chaudhary

== Production ==
The film began production in 2006. Producer Subhash Ghai promoted Love Express more than this film although they both released at around the same time.

== Reception ==
Taran Adarsh of Bollywood Hungama opined that "On the whole, CYCLE KICK is a decent attempt, but the predicament is that it arrives with as good as zilch awareness". Subhash K. Jha wrote that "'Cycle Kick' is not quite the kick-in-the-groin take on the non-urban youth's aspirations that "Iqbal" so successfully happened to be. But it has its heart in the right place. And it doesn't puts its foot in its mouth".
