= Santhosh Jogi =

Indian actor

- Born: Santhosh Jogi; 25 June 1975; Eravimangalam, Kerala, India
- Died: 13 April 2010 (aged 34)
- Occupation: Actor/singer
- Years active: 2004–2010

Santhosh Jogi (1975 – 13 April 2010) was an Indian film actor and singer who acted in more than 30 films in Malayalam cinema. He marked his debut in a 2004 Malayalam movie, Two Wheeler and played the main antagonist in Mayavi.

== Personal life ==
Jogi was born in Eravimangalam to Purathu Sethumadhavan and Komattil Malathi Amma. He completed his education from Vyasa College, Thrissur. He started his career as a singer at local stage programmes. He married Jijy on 24 June 2001 and had two daughters, Chithralekha and Kapila.

== Death ==
Santhosh Jogi was found dead in his friend's flat at Thrissur on 13 April 2010. His body was found hanging from a fan, and the police stated that the suicide was due to family problems.

== Filmography ==
Year	Title	Role	Notes
2005	Rajamanikyam		
2005	Ponmudipuzhayorathu		
2005	Iruvattam Manavaatti		
2006	Pulijanmam		
2006	Rashtram		
2006	Balram vs. Tharadas	Shivankutty	
2006	Keerthi Chakra	Havildar Kishori Lal	
2006	Oruvan		
2007	Ali Bhai	Salim Babu	
2007	Big B	Local goon Felix	
2007	Chotta Mumbai		
2007	Mayavi	Thottappally Sugunan	
2007	Nazrani		
2007	Two Wheeler		
2007	July 4	Firoz	
2007	Khaki	Vasudev	
2008	Chandranilekkulla Vazhi		
2008	Malabar Wedding		
2008	Kurukshethra		
2008	Mulla		
2010	Pokkiri Raja	Sathya	Posthumously
2010	Apoorvaragam	Sethu	Posthumously
2011	Christian Brothers	SI Johnson	Posthumously
