= Paappi Appacha =

- Official poster
- Directed by: Mamas K. Chandran
- Written by: Mamas K. Chandran
- Produced by: Anoop
- Starring: Dileep; Innocent
- Cinematography: Sanjeev Shankar
- Edited by: V. T. Sreejith
- Music by: Vidyasagar
- Distributed by: Kalasangham Films; Manjunaadha
- Release date: 14 April 2010
- Running time: 160 minutes
- Country: India
- Language: Malayalam

Paappi Appacha is a 2010 Indian Malayalam-language action-comedy film written and directed by Mamas K. Chandran (in his directorial debut). The film stars Dileep and Innocent in lead roles and was released in April 2010 across more than 70 screens in Kerala. The characters in the film exhibit a lifestyle similar to the comedians portrayed in the song "Paappi Appacha" from the 1972 film Mayiladumkunnu, which starred Prem Nazir.

== Plot ==
Nirappel Mathai, a businessman and politician and his son Paappi, who live like close friends get into all sorts of mischiefs in their village, Ithirikkandam, accompanied by Paappi's aide Kuttaappi. Despite the villagers' fondness of the Nirappel family, the father and son struggle to maintain their image of a prosperous family. Paappi's childhood sweetheart, Annie works as a teacher in the school run by Mathai's family, but Annie does not like him, she got humiliated by Paappi himself, in one of their school days. Also Paappi quit school while in the 9th grade, leaving him with an illiterate image, just like his father, in front of her. Paappi's mother Maria and younger sister Mollykkutty also like Annie and want her to marry Paappi.

Meanwhile, Annie, with support of Shashankan Muthalali, who is rather inept, yet envious about the apparent prosperity of the Nirappel family, and Annie's colleague Dasan Maash stands against Paappi in Panchayath election, to teach Paappi a lesson about social responsibility. Despite Paappi's best efforts, Annie wins the seat and becomes Panchayath President, leaving Paappi in a further shameful in front of her.

In the meantime, a businessman Manikkunju comes to the village becoming Mathai's rival, creating problems with the Nirappel men and with the intention to spoil their business. Annie then receives a marriage proposal. Hearing this, Paappi goes to Annie's house who sees him jumping to catch a glimpse of the proceedings. Tony Issac, her groom-to-be says he expects a positive response from Annie and leaves. Later she gets a call from Tony's mother who verbally abuses her, as her son was allegedly brutally assaulted by Paappi. Annie, furious about this, goes to Mathai's house and tells all this. She even tells that due to Paappi's behaviour Mollykkutty's marriage will also be disrupted and Paappi will even try to kill Mathai. Influenced by Annie's words, Mathai believes that Paappi would not do anything like that. Paappi, outrageous about Annie's outburst, goes verbally rough to Annie during a school function and in a fit of rage shouts that he assaulted Tony. In a fit of shame and rage, Mathai slaps Paappi and a crack is openly formed in their relation. Things get worse when the school is mysteriously burned down and Mathai completely disowns Paappi, thinking he is the culprit, also trying to commit patricide in the process. Shashankan, seeing this as a golden opportunity to rip apart the Nirappel family, steps in and joins side with Mathai, apparently putting Paappi out of the good image. In a fit of revenge, Paappi tries to shut down Nirappel financial institution now in the hands of Mathai, through a word of mouth on bankruptcy. However, Mathai, who instantly sees the picture, turns the tables, by publicly lying that it was Paappi who is legally due to settle the financial deals. Unable to handle the sudden turn of events, Paappi and Kuttaappi escape from the scene. In the end, Shashankan occupies Paappi's place as Mathai's trustee, much to the ire of Paappi and Kuttaappi.

Meanwhile, Annie realises her mistake and feels guilty and responsible for making Paappi and Mathai enemies. Paappi is trying to survive on his own, with Kuttaappi by his side, along with attempting to give Mathai a hard time. Maria and Mollykkutty still root for Paappi, much to Mathai's dismay. Paappi obtains a legal freeze on Mathai's financial deals, rendering Mathai in a financial lockdown. Finally, Mathai is forced to sell off Maria's land. But Paappi, out of deep love for his mother, foils the plot by having the land designated as archeologically valuable, without its having such value. This action renders the land unsellable.

On a rainy day, Annie happens to meet Paappi outside the church. Annie apologies for her rude behaviour she done then and at the same time Paappi tells her that he didn't disrupt Annie's wedding proposal and that it was nothing more than his state of agitation which led to the unpleasant events that followed. Paappi believes that Shashankan disrupted it. Slowly, Annie begins to develop a love interest in Paappi, who has now come clean. In the meantime, Manikkunju approaches the financially depressed Mathai for an alliance on the pretext of a friendly reconciliation, but Mathai was shrewd enough to see through the plan and turns down the offer, much to Manikkunju's rising hatred towards Mathai.

The villagers are now worried that the city market once run efficiently by Paappi and Mathai together does not function the same anymore and the villagers fear the market's doom if taken over by Manikkunju. They seeks help from Annie as she unknowingly started all these problems. Annie who had earlier taken a diary from Paappi regarding the plans he had for the Panchayath if he wins the election, he uses a scheme of a Farmers' Co-operative Society buying the market items from farmers and selling it giving the profit to the farmers. She shares this idea with Dasan Maash who is also seemed to be excited about this. At that night, a drunken duo Mathai and Shashankan, gets attacked by a person with a sword, while walking on the roadside. Mathai gets injured while Shashankan escapes as the neighbours hear the commotion and come out. Shashankan gets shocked by seeing incident and the attacker's face. The wounded Mathai tells that Paappi did it. Everyone believes that Paappi is behind the attempt. The police tries to catch Paappi for attacking Mathai and kidnapping Annie. But Paappi escapes and he saves Shashankan from some goons who tries to kill him. But, Shashankan runs away from Paappi as he thinks that Shashankan stabbed Mathai, kidnapped Annie and blamed Paappi for everything. Paappi catches him and Shashankan tells that he had some enmity against them but he did not want to kill them and reveals the real person who stabbed Mathai.

Soon, it was revealed that Annie was actually kidnapped by Manikkunju and his men. In a struggle, she tries to escape and finds Dasan and asks for help. Manikkunju arrives and soon a twist occurs which turns out that Manikkunju is Dasan's business partner. Dasan reveals to Annie that he had a heavy grudge against Paappi and Mathai, who are now doing business on the land which was actually his own, but now bought by Mathai long ago. Dasan's original name is revealed to be Sivadasa Kaimal. His father, Radhakrishnan, who was prosperous than Mathai, had to sell and pledge his land off to the Nirappel family, due to his extravagant lifestyle. After losing everything and due to shame, Kaimal ran way and later he committed suicide. Dasan's main plan was to break Paappi's and Mathai's relationship, in order to retrieve the land, during which he has been obsessed with Annie since the first time he saw her and even though he knows Annie loves Paappi, he still craves for her body. He tried to separate them by contesting Annie against Paappi in the election and sending goons to kill Paappi. But the plan fails. He then executes his plan to disrupt Annie's marriage proposal in Paappi's style and setting fire on the school to break Paappi's and Mathai's relationship. Manikkunju helps in most of his plan. Dasan was the one who attacked Mathai with Manikkunju. Only Shashankan witnessed this and Dasan tries to kill Shashankan so that he will not reveal the truth to anyone, but he escapes. The goons who tried to kill Shashankan were Dasan's men.

After revealing all the truth, Dasan proceeds to molest Annie, but Paappi arrives, saves her and trashes Dasan, Manikkunju and their men. But Manikkunju thrashes Paappi, very badly. Meanwhile, Mathai arrives with Kuttaappi, Shashankan and his henchmen after learning the entire truth. He tells to fight back if he is Mathai's son, which he does bravely. In the end, against Paappi's rage to kill Dasan for ruining Paappi's and Mathai's relationship, he has to release him because of Mathai's fatherly plea. Paappi reveals to Dasan that he gave him the teacher job, after knowing that Dasan is Kaimal's son and out of sympathy for his family's downfall. Pappi then warns Dasan to never return to Ithirikkandam ever again and throws one final punch at the latter. I When the movie is about to be done, Shashankan comes clean and asks Paappi if he loves his father or mother and he was about to say father but his father says "Annie!" and they end the movie happily.

== Cast ==
- Dileep as Nirappel Paappi
- Innocent as Nirappel Mathai, Paappi's father
- Kavya Madhavan as Annie Varghese, Paappi's childhood sweetheart
- Ashokan as Shashankan Muthalali
- Dharmajan Bolgatty as Kuttappi, Paappi's driver
- Rajeev Parameshwar as Shivadasa Kaimal (Dasan Maash), the main antagonist
- Suresh Krishna as Manikkunju, the secondary antagonist
- Kalabhavan Shajohn as Manikandan, Shashankan's sidekick
- K.P.A.C. Lalitha as Mariya, Paappi's mother
- Manjusha Sajish aka Manju Raghavan as Mollykkutty, Paappi's sister
- Shobha Mohan as Annie's mother
- Kochu Preman as Keshavan
- Machan Varghese as Velayudhan, a villager
- Narayanankutty as Nicholas, a villager
- Manikandan Pattambi as Thomas, a villager
- Abu Salim as CI Idiyan Philipose
- Manju Satheesh as teacher
- Thesni Khan as Shylaja teacher
- Majeed Edavanakad as Headmaster
- Balu Varghese as Vijeesh, School Student
- Adithyan Ajayan
- Jolly Eshow

== Production ==
The film was mainly shot at various locations in Thodupuzha. The graphics of this movie were done by Ranjith Bharghavi, a graphic designer from Kerala, India, known for his work in films like Neelathamara, Happy Husbands, and Elsamma Enna Aankutty, among others.

== Release ==
The film debuted in 73 releasing stations on 14 April 2010 (the day of Vishu, the Kerala New Year festival)

=== Box office ===
The film was a commercial success.

== Soundtrack ==
Paappi Appacha

Soundtrack album by Vidyasagar
- Released: 24 March 2010
- Recorded: Varsha Vallaki Studios
- Genre: Feature film Soundtrack
- Length: 19:29
- Language: Malayalam
- Label: Satyam Audios
- Producer: Vidyasagar

Vidyasagar chronology
Neelathamara (2009)	Paappi Appacha (2010)	Apoorva Ragam (2010)

The film's soundtrack contains four songs, all composed by Vidyasagar. The lyrics were written by Gireesh Puthenchery and Vayalar Sarathchandra Varma. This was one of the last films of Giressh Puthenchery as a lyricist, due to his untimely death in February 2010.

#	Title	Singer(s)
1	"Kaattumaakkaan"	Geemon, Karthik, Chorus
2	"Manjin Velli Thooval Chutti"	Madhu Balakrishnan, Sujatha Mohan
3	"Paappee Appacha"	Geemon, Ranjith Govind
4	"Thammil"	Udit Narayan, Sujatha Mohan
