= The Sound Story =

- Poster
- Directed by: Prasad Prabhakar
- Screenplay by: Prasad Prabhakar
- Produced by: Rajeev Panakkal
- Starring: Resul Pookutty
- Cinematography: Neil D'Cunha
- Edited by: Unni Malayil; Antony
- Music by: Songs: Rahul Raj; Score: Sharreth
- Production companies: Palmstone Multimedia; Prasad Prabhakar Productions
- Distributed by: Sony Pictures Entertainment Films India
- Release date: 5 April 2019
- Country: India
- Language: Malayalam

The Sound Story is a 2019 Indian Malayalam-language film written and directed by Prasad Prabhakar, starring sound designer Resul Pookutty in the lead role, marking his acting debut. The films narrates the story of a sound designer who strives hard to realize his dream of recording all the sounds of the Thrissur Pooram. The film was released on 5 April 2019. The film also contains Tamil, English and Urdu dialogues/lyrics. The film was dubbed and released in Hindi under the same title and in Tamil as Oru Kadhai Sollattuma.

== Cast ==
- Resul Pookutty as a fictional version of himself
- Joy Mathew as George

== Production ==
The project was initially planned as a documentary about the temple festival Thrissur Pooram, it later evolved into a feature film about a sound engineer's endeavor to record the sounds of the event for the visually impaired people. After a four-month long pre-production, over 80 technicians from Hollywood and India worked on capturing the sounds of the Pooram festival featuring 300 artists and crowd, live. Filming was completed in 17 days.

== Soundtrack ==
The original songs of the movie are composed by Rahul Raj. The audio rights have been acquired by Sony Music India.

A. R. Rahman launched the audio along with director S. Shankar on 12 November 2017. Rahul Raj had to be in Berklee, Spain in October 2018. Realizing he would not have the time to complete the background score, he opted out. Composer Sharreth was thus brought in to do the background score.

No.	Title	Lyrics	Singer(s)	Length
1.	"Beetein Na Yeh Pal"	Fouzia Abubacker (Urdu), Sunitha Sarathy (English)	Rahul Raj, Sunitha Sarathy
2.	"Pooram"		Ranjini Hannah Saban, Manjari Jayendran, Shyam Mohan, Prasad McCoy, Ajay Sathyan
3.	"Panja Vadyam"		Kongadu Madhu
4.	"Panjari Velam"		Peruvanam Satheeshan Marar
5.	"Ilanjithara Melam Live (Pandimelam)"		Peruvanam Kuttan Marar

== Release ==
The film was released on 5 April 2019.
