= Mannar Mathai Speaking 2 =

- Theatrical-release poster
- Directed by: Mamas
- Written by: Mamas
- Produced by: Siby Thottupuram; Joby Mundamattom
- Starring: Innocent; Mukesh; Sai Kumar; Biju Menon; Janardhanan; Vijayaraghavan; Aparna Gopinath; Shammi Thilakan; Niyas Backer
- Cinematography: Vishnu Narayanan
- Music by: Rahul Raj
- Production company: SJM Entertainments
- Distributed by: Kalasangham Films
- Release date: 24 January 2014
- Country: India
- Language: Malayalam

Mannar Mathai Speaking 2 is a 2014 Indian Malayalam-language comedy thriller film directed by Mamas K. Chandran. It is a sequel to the 1995 comedy Mannar Mathai Speaking and the third installment in the Ramji Rao franchise. Actors Innocent, Mukesh, Sai Kumar, Biju Menon, Vijayaraghavan and Janardhanan reprised their roles; while Aparna Gopinath, Shammi Thilakan and a few others are also included in the cast. The film features original music and background score composed by Rahul Raj.

== Plot ==
Years after their earlier adventures, Mannar Mathai runs a travel agency, Urvashi Tours & Travels, with his old partners Gopalakrishnan and Balakrishnan. To celebrate the 25th anniversary of their drama troupe, Mathai plans a new play, though his partners are reluctant due to past troubles in the theatre.

When they advertise for a new English-speaking driver, Mathai secretly adds another ad seeking a “heroine” for the play. This brings in Nithya and her friend Unni. While Unni is hired as the driver, Mathai sees Nithya as his lead actress. Soon, the trio encounters their former foe, Mahendra Varma, now mentally impaired after an accident. They forgive him, but new complications arise when they learn that Nithya and Unni are fugitives falsely accused of bank fraud.

It is revealed that Nithya is the daughter of Ramji Rao, who has since reformed, taken the name Kunjumon, and become a pastor. Meanwhile, Mahendra’s identical twin brother, Hareendran — an international criminal — arrives in search of a stolen diamond hidden in a bag now held by SI Babumon. When Hareendran kidnaps Gopalakrishnan’s daughters to retrieve the diamond, Mathai and his friends attempt a risky rescue.

Amid chaos involving mistaken identities, betrayals, and overlapping kidnappings, a massive brawl breaks out between the criminals, police, and theatre members. Hareendran is apparently arrested, but it is later revealed that he escaped after swapping clothes with his twin brother, Mahendran.

The film ends during the troupe’s 25th anniversary play, where Gopalakrishnan notices the lost diamond embedded in Mathai’s crown. As Mathai hints that someone may soon come looking for it, they spot Hareendran in the audience — only for him to vanish moments later.

== Cast ==
- Innocent as Mannar Mathai
- Mukesh as Gopalakrishnan
- Sai Kumar as Balakrishnan
- Biju Menon in a dual role as:
  - Mahendra Varma
  - Hareendra Varma
- Vijayaraghavan as Ramji Rao / Pastor Kunjumon
- Aparna Gopinath as Nithya
- Janardhanan as Garvasees Aashan
- Indrans as Ponnappan
- Priyanka Anoop as Shakunthala
- Shammi Thilakan as Driver Koshi
- Akshitha as Malayali House Fame
- Kalabhavan Shajon as SI Babumon
- Niyas Backer as Cook Manjulan
- Basil Paulose as Unni
- Chembil Ashokan
- Ullas Pandalam
- Andrew Ross as the Diamond Smuggler
- Naseer Sankranthi
- Vani Viswanath as Meera/Stella Fernandez [Special appearance in the title song] (From the first part's film shots)
- Sukumari as Gopalakrishnan's mother [Special appearance in the title song] (From the first part's film shots)

== Music ==
Mannar Mathai Speaking 2

Soundtrack album by Rahul Raj
- Released: 17 January 2014
- Recorded: 2013
- Genre: Feature film soundtrack
- Length: 20:11
- Language: Malayalam
- Label: East Coast Audio
- Producer: Rahul Raj

Rahul Raj chronology
London Bridge (2014)	Mannar Mathai Speaking 2 (2014)	Kadavul Paathi Mirugam Paathi (2014)

The music and background score of the movie are composed, orchestrated, and produced by Rahul Raj. The soundtrack opened to positive reviews with Music Aloud.com saying "Composer Rahul Raj continues the franchise's tradition of entertaining music", while particularly mentioning that the interludes of Gathakalaporin are 'brilliant'. Milliblog.com hailed Mizhikaloro as the best song for its fantastic tune and catchy arrangements.

No.	Title	Singers	Length
1.	"Chemmana Chelorukki (Urvashi)"	Vijay Yesudas, Teenu Tellence	4:42
2.	"Mizhikaloro"	Haricharan	3:50
3.	"Thirayane"	Arun Alat, Nithin Raj, Lonely Doggy, Rahul Raj	4:18
4.	"Urvashi (Sufi Reprise)"	Maqbool	2:04
5.	"Gathakala Porin"	Afsal, Tom Sebastian, Vipin Xavier	5:17

== Reception ==
The film received negative reviews from critics. Sify movies commented, "You can only watch Director Mamas's Mannar Mathai Speaking 2 with tremendous anger and disbelief as he makes a mockery of two much-loved films with this one. Please don't speak again, Mr. Mannar Mathai!" Rediff movie reviews commented, "Mannar Mathai Speaking 2 is a repeat of what we've seen before."
