= Winter (2009 film) =

- Theatrical release poster
- Directed by: Deepu Karunakaran
- Written by: Deepu Karunakaran
- Produced by: K. Radhakrishnan
- Starring: Jayaram; Bhavana
- Cinematography: Jaya Krishna Gummadi
- Edited by: Arun Kumar Aravind
- Music by: M. R. Rajakrishnan
- Production company: Jayalakshmi Films
- Distributed by: Sky Blue Films
- Release date: 16 July 2009
- Running time: 117 minutes
- Country: India
- Language: Malayalam

Winter is a 2009 Indian Malayalam-language slasher film written and directed by Deepu Karunakaran. It stars Jayaram and Bhavana. The music was composed by M. R. Rajakrishnan. The film was shot in 2003, however it was released in 2009. It was dubbed in Tamil as Bhayam Bhayam, released in 2012.

== Plot ==
The film tells the tale of Dr. Ramdas and his family being terrorized by a series of mysterious phenomena in their new house. The woods surrounding the house were previously the site of a number of serial killings of children, attributed to a psychopath. The psychopath died nearby while being chased by the police. Soon, the mysterious killings start again, and Ramdas tries to figure out the connection between his house and the serial killings.

The film begins with a number of children who are kidnapped and found murdered with slit throats in a village locality in Andhra Pradesh. One victim was found alive by the police, led by A.C.P. Saju Paul, and was saved by a Malayali surgeon in the area named Dr Ramdas. Saju tells Ramdas that he suspects that the killings are the acts of a psychopath watching the children die of blood loss. They track the killer to an abandoned house. The psychopath is killed in the subsequent car chase after an explosion, and his burnt remains are found in his jeep.

1 year later, Dr Ramdas and his wife Shyama lives in a flat in Hyderabad, along with their children. Their oldest daughter gets into trouble at school, and they consult the psychologist, Dr Vinod. Dr Vinod advises them to move the kids to a spacious home instead of the apartment, to give the children space to run and play around the house like in a traditional family house. After a long search, Dr Ramdas finds an ad for the Hillview house in a newspaper. Visiting the house, he meets a man named Stalin, who says that he is the owner of the house, and that he lives in a cottage on the property. Despite his strange behaviour, Dr Ramdas decides to buy the house.

On their first night in the house, they hear the upstairs toilet flush automatically. While Shyama suspects it was an intruder, Ramdas dismisses it as faulty plumbing. The next day, while Ramdas is at work, Shyama begins to experience strange phenomena in the house, such as the bathroom shower turning on, a big photo frame in the prayer room crashing to the floor, and seeing the carcass of a goat on the front steps.

Soon after, Ramdas hires Gopalan, a Malayali cook from back home, to help with household chores. Gopalan goes to the nearby market and enters a fight with the locals. After being beaten up, he meets and befriends a fellow Malayali who warns him that the Hillhouse View area is haunted and refuses to accompany him back there. Gopalan is struck by fear on his way home, and feels like he is being chased by a mysterious presence in the woods. When he makes it back home, he spots a fire in the upstairs room of the house and alerts Shyama, and they are able to put it out.

Shyama believes there is some supernatural cause at play and urges Ramdas to move to another house. Ramdas, who is against superstition, dismisses her concerns and consults Dr Vinod. Dr Vinod advises him to consult a Vastu shastra expert. The Vastu astrologer visits and assesses the house. After sensing that Ramdas does not believe him, he explains that Vastu is more of a science than superstition, and that he utilises knowledge about air pressure movements, furniture placement, heat and light etc. to remove problems caused by bad placements. He explains away the incidents such as the spontaneous fire being the cause of improperly placed window panes, and conducts his procedures to make the house safer. Though initially sceptical, Ramdas is convinced as he notices the changes in the house's atmosphere after the Vastu ritual is complete.

The family's experience at the house improves as the mysterious incidents come to a halt after the Vastu ritual. However, one night, Ramdas sees an apparition outside a window and is disturbed. Later, Ramdas plans to take his family to a movie and leaves Gopalan home alone at night. Gopalan is being stalked by a shadowy presence as he moves about the house. Upon investigating a crashing sound upstairs, he is shown being chased by an unseen presence and runs out of the house. He runs into Stalin, who keeps him company until Ramdas returns. Gopalan insists that the house is haunted and decides to go back to his hometown.

Ramdas takes Stalin aside and asks him the history of the house. Stalin admits that the house belonged to the murderer behind the old serial killings, who was also his son. He says he does not want to believe in superstition, but he insists that he had confirmed his son's death. Later, Ramdas is called by the villagers to attend a patient who is sick. On the way back, he feels like he is being chased by an unknown presence, and sees various bad omens. Thoroughly disturbed, Ramdas takes a day off. He confides in his colleague Dr. Sandeep, who helps him look for a new house. Later, the family dog is found with his neck sliced, in the same way as the murder victims many years ago. Ramdas finds a new house to rent, and is told that he will need to wait a couple of weeks before he can move in.

Ramdas gets a call from ACP Saju Paul who warns him that there have been strange attacks in the area near his house. Ramdas and his family continue to be terrorized by strange incidents. One night, the villagers bring an injured child to Ramdas's house, but he is unable to save her in time. The child has a deep cut in her neck, who Ramdas notices is similar to the one on the serial killer's victims. Next day, Ramdas is visited by a villager who reports that there have been new cases of attacks similar to the night before, and points out the similarity to the old killer's Modus operandi. Ramdas reports his suspicion to Saju Paul who dismisses it, insisting they confirmed the death of the previous killer. The police nevertheless hire Dr Vinod to look into the psychology of the killer. Dr Vinod after investigating confirms that the handprints of the new killer is different from the previous killer, and concludes that the killer is a copycat killer who wants to take over the role of the previous killer. He also advises Ramdas that his family may be in danger and to move from the house. The police begin a manhunt for the killer.

The night before they move to another house, Ramdas is called to the hospital. He advises Shyama to invite Stalin over for safety. Shyama is seen being stalked by a mysterious presence in the house. She goes over to Stalin's house, only to find Stalin stabbed to death. Shyama gathers the kids and calls Ramdas, who requests the police to go rescue Shyama. Saju Paul picks up Shyama and the kids to take them to a safe house, but are stopped on the road by the killer. The killer defeats the police but Shyama gets away and runs to the forest with the kids. After not hearing from them for some time, Ramdas drives over to the house. Meanwhile, Shyama is attacked and falls unconscious and the children are chased by the killer. One child makes it safely back to the road and is rescued by Ramdas. Ramdas goes in search of the others, and rescues his other daughter from the killer. He hits the killer over the head with a rock. Ramdas rescues Shyama and the kids and begin driving away, but are stopped by the injured but alive killer. Ramdas finishes him off by running him over with his car.

The film ends with Saju calling Ramdas on the phone to inform him that he got promoted to Commissioner. When asked if he still lives at Hillview, Ramdas says that he feels very happy in the house now that the danger is gone, and he plans to stay there. The camera zooms out to show another mysterious figure standing in front of the house.

== Cast ==
- Jayaram as Dr Ramdas
- Bhavana as Shyama (voiceover by Bhagyalakshmi)
- Manoj K. Jayan as Dr Vinod
- T. G. Ravi as Stalin
- Vijayakumar as ACP Saju Paul IPS
- Jayan Cherthala as Dr Sam
- Vijeesh as Gopalan
- Nawab Shah as Ripper
- Bahuleyan
- Baby Raihana as Remya
- Baby Marena as Karthika

== Release ==
The film was originally shot on 2003. The film was released on 16 July 2009 6 years after shooting.

=== Reception ===
Paresh C. Palicha of Rediff.com rated 1.5 out of 5 stars and wrote that "the narrative is confused. It is not sure whether the director wishes to be a true horror film or a logical psychopathic tale where everything is explained, and the loose ends are tied in the climax".
