= Time (2007 film) =

2007 Indian film

- Directed by: Shaji Kailas
- Written by: Rajesh Jayaraman
- Produced by: Gopan
- Starring: Suresh Gopi; Siddique; Sai Kumar; Padmapriya; Vimala Raman
- Cinematography: Raja Rathinam
- Edited by: Don Max
- Music by: Rahul Raj
- Production company: Bhagyachithra Films
- Distributed by: Bhagyachithra Films
- Release date: 18 May 2007
- Country: India
- Language: Malayalam

Time is a 2007 Indian Malayalam-language Psychological crime thriller film directed by Shaji Kailas and written by Rajesh Jayaraman. The film features Suresh Gopi in a dual role as a father and son, along with Siddique, Vimala Raman and Padmapriya in important roles. The music and background score were composed by Rahul Raj.

== Plot ==
An anti-corruption drive led by Disha, a Gandhian social organization leads to the resignation of Krishnan Nambiar, a state minister. Susan Mary Thomas, an upcoming English novelist is the main brain behind Disha, who also is involved in several woman empowerment programs. Just after his resignation, Krishnan Nambiar is found brutally murdered at a private tennis court. The chief Minister assigns the investigation to sharp and witty IPS officer Dr. Appan Menon, who holds a PhD in Criminology. Considered by many to be a semi-eccentric for his behavior, Appan Menon is relieved from the Kerala State Civil Supplies Corporation, where he was working as the Managing Director. Appan Menon regularly calls up Vaiga, his wife at his residence in Madurai and gives a complete account of his day-to-day activities. Alexander Mekkadan, who had begun the investigation of Krishan Nambiar's murder couldn't cope with the style of Appan Menon. Susan is called up by Appan for preliminary questioning, but finds nothing suspicious. Up on calling Vaiga in the evening, she instructs Appan to be a bit more soft towards Susan and asks him to apologize to her. Appan reaches Susan's home, and is quite impressed by her activities, but disagrees with her non-violent movements.

In the meantime, Sulaiman Rawthar, a political leader is found dead. Apppan suspects both murders to be linked. The police arrest Durga Dasan, a former naxalite who claims himself to be a messenger of Goddess Durga. But upon questioning, it is revealed that he is not linked to the murders. One day, Susan makes a visit to Appan's house and is shocked to find out that Vaiga had died long back. With the help of Sahadevan, Appan's personal assistant, she gets his personal diary through which she tries to know more about him. "Appan, son of a police superintendent in Tamil Nadu police, had a pale and colorless childhood. His father Vishwanatha Menon, who was a strict follower of British army discipline tried to impose it on his son as well. Appan joined cleared the CSE to become an IPS officer after his education. After his father's demise, he married Vaiga, whom he silently loved since his teenage days.

Appan is appointed as the Superintendent of Police at Madhukarai. A riot spreads through the village and 16 innocent villagers are brutally massacred. Appan found out that Balasingam was the brain behind the violence. His ambition to set up a Special Economic Zone was opposed by the villagers, who feared their land would be acquired. In retaliation, Balasingam wiped out the villagers to ease up the acquisition. Appan Menon arrested Balasingam and his accomplices. One evening, Kartha, Sulaiman Rauthar, Krishnan Nambiar and Kurian Varghese arrived at his home and demanded a negotiation. Appan snubbed them by refusing to accept any sort of negotiation. In a few minutes a group of thugs entered his residence. Appan fights off the thugs, but they ties him up and kills Vaiga. Following this incident, Appan develops a psycho disturbance, in which he feels the presence of Vaiga with him.

After reading his diary, Susan approaches Dr. Sreenivasan Iyengar, a psychiatrist for further details. Dr. Iyengar explains about Appan's visit to him just after the incident. He had revealed to Dr. Iyengar that to get justice for Vaiga, he had killed Balasingam and was planning to kill the rest of the goons. Susan is shocked to find out that Appan himself is behind the murders of Krishnan Nambiar, Sulaiman and Kartha. Susan reaches out to Alexander Mekkadan and passes out the information. Mekkadan launches a hunt for Appan, but he successfully flees from the nets. When Appan captures Kurian, he explains that Koshy Abraham Koshy, a high profile NRI businessman is the master brain behind everything. Appan kills Kurian and reaches out to Koshy. He kills Koshy in the presence of the children of the 16 villagers of Madhukarai, whom Koshy had killed. The film ends by showing Appan witnessing a violent protest led by Susan.

== Cast ==
- Suresh Gopi in a dual role as:
  - Dr. Appan Menon IPS (Son)
    - Arun Kumar as Young Appan
  - SP Vishwanatha Menon IPS (Father)
- Siddique as DIG Alexander Mekkadan IPS, City Police Commissioner
- Sai Kumar as Koshy Abraham Koshy
- Vijayakumar as CI Venu
- Manoj K. Jayan as Durgadasan
- Padmapriya as Susan Mary Thomas
- Vimala Raman as Vaiga
- P. Sreekumar as Raman Nair
- Mala Parvathi as Mary Thomas
- Lal as Dr. Srinivasa Iyengar
- T. P. Madhavan as DGP Raman Naik IPS
- Kollam Thulasi as Chief Minister Sadanandan
- Mohanraj as Kurian Varghese
- Biju Pappan as Krishnan Nambiar
- Jisna Ali as Gayathri
- Kundara Johny as Vakkachan
- Mini Arun

== Music ==
Time

Soundtrack album by Rahul Raj
- Released: 2007
- Genre: Film soundtrack
- Label: Satyam Audios

Rahul Raj chronology
Chotta Mumbai	Time	Annan Thambi

The music and background score were composed, arranged and programmed by Rahul Raj. The soundtrack features two tracks and Rahulraj won the JayCee Foundation Award for Best Music Direction.

Track	Song title	Singer(s)	Lyricist	Other notes
1	Time Theme	Rahul Raj		Instrumental
2	oru Raapoo	Madhu Balakrishnan, Sangeetha Sreekanth	Gireesh Puthenchery	
