= White (2016 film) =

- Theatrical release poster
- Directed by: Uday Ananthan
- Written by: Praveen Balakrishnan; Nandini Valsan; Uday Ananthan
- Produced by: Jyoti Deshpande
- Starring: Mammootty; Huma Qureshi; Siddique; Sunil Sukhada; Sona Nair
- Cinematography: Amarjeet Singh
- Edited by: Achu Vijayan
- Music by: Rahul Raj
- Production company: Appletree Movies
- Distributed by: Eros International
- Release date: 29 July 2016 (India)
- Running time: 149 minutes
- Country: India
- Language: Malayalam
- Box office: 65 Lakhs

White is a 2016 Indian Malayalam-language romantic drama film directed by Uday Ananthan, starring Mammootty and Huma Qureshi. The soundtrack and film score was composed by Rahul Raj. Filming took place in Budapest, London, Bangalore, and Kerala.

White was released worldwide on 29 July 2016 and received negative reviews from critics.

== Plot ==
Roshni Menon (Huma Qureshi), an IT professional in Bangalore, is friends with Deepa (Sona Nair). Their paths diverge when Deepa moves to New York, and Roshni accepts a job in London under manager Anwar Rasool (Shanker Ramakrishnan).

Six months later, Roshni encounters a drunk businessman, Prakash Roy (Mammootty), trying to commit suicide by jumping in front of a train. She manages to save him but leaves him behind after realizing that the man is intoxicated. Later, Prakash's butler, Raymond (John Millichap), contacts Roshni after using CCTV footage of the incident to find her. When Roshni visits Prakash, she assumes that he is a womanizer and storms off. She accidentally takes his wallet as she is leaving. Prakash contacts Roshni to retrieve his wallet, suggesting they meet at the cemetery. Although initially hesitant, Roshni eventually agrees and returns the wallet. Over time, Prakash persistently seeks her friendship and gradually wins her over.

== Cast ==
- Mammootty as Prakash Roy
- Huma Qureshi In a dual role as Roshni Menon and Eleena Prakash Roy
- Siddique as Pradeep Roy
- Shankar Ramakrishnan as Anwar Rasool
- Ahmed Sidhique as Georgy
- Ansar Kalabhavan as Mathew Kora
- Sona Nair as Deepa Pradeep
- K. P. A. C. Lalitha as Mariyamma
- John Millichap as Raymond

== Music ==
The film score and soundtrack were composed by Rahul Raj. The soundtrack album, featuring three songs, was released by Eros Music.

| No. | Title | Performer(s) | Length |
|---|---|---|---|
| 1. | "Eriyumoru Venalil" | Vijay Yesudas | 3:13 |
| 2. | "Oru Vela" | Shweta Mohan | 5:04 |
| 3. | "Premadramee Lokam" | Shweta Mohan | 3:16 |

== Release ==
White was released on 29 July 2016. The satellite rights were acquired by Surya TV.
