= Anwar Rasheed =

Indian film director

- Born: Anwar Rasheed; 19 March 1976 (age 50); Kalluvathukkal, Kollam, Kerala, India
- Occupations: Film director; film Producer
- Years active: 2005–present
- Organization: Anwar Rasheed Entertainments
- Spouse: Teresa Rani
- Children: 2

Anwar Rasheed is an Indian film director and producer who works in Malayalam films. He made his debut in 2005 with Rajamanikyam. He continued to do successful action-comedy films, such as Chotta Mumbai (2007) and Annan Thambi (2008). His directorial drama Ustad Hotel (2012) won the National Film Award for Best Popular Film Providing Wholesome Entertainment. He has produced critically and commercially successful films like Bangalore Days (2014), Premam (2015) and Parava (2017) under the banner Anwar Rasheed Entertainments.

== Career ==
Rasheed started his career by assisting director Ranjith in his films. After Ranjith withdrew his decision to direct the film Rajamanikyam, Rasheed was invited to direct the project. The 2005 film, in which Mammootty played the lead role, became Rasheed's directorial debut. In 2007, he directed the action-comedy Chotta Mumbai, starring Mohanlal in the lead role. It was followed by the action-comedy Annan Thambi (2008), the segment Bridge in Kerala Cafe (2009) and Ustad Hotel (2012), the latter won the National Film Award for Best Popular Film Providing Wholesome Entertainment. In 2013, Anwar directed the segment Aami in the anthology film 5 Sundarikal. His latest movie as a director is Trance, starring Fahadh Faasil. Anwar also produced the movie under his banner Anwar Rasheed Entertainments.

== Filmography ==
=== As director ===
Year	Film	Notes
2005	Rajamanikyam	
2007	Chotta Mumbai	
2008	Annan Thambi	
2009	Kerala Cafe	Segment - Bridge
2012	Ustad Hotel	
2013	5 Sundarikal	Segment - Aamy
2020	Trance	

=== As producer ===
Year	Film	Director	Notes
2014	Bangalore Days	Anjali Menon	Co-produced with Sophia Paul
2015	Premam	Alphonse Putharen	
2017	Parava	Soubin Shahir	Co-produced with Shyju Unni
2020	Trance	Himself	
2024	Aavesham	Jithu Madhavan	Co-produced with Fahadh Faasil and Nazriya Nazim
2025	Pravinkoodu Shappu	Sreeraj Sreenivasan	
2026	Bachelor Party D'eux	Amal Neerad	Co-produced with Amal Neerad, Fahadh Faasil and Friends

=== As actor ===
- Ee Parakkum Thalika (2001)
- Kuberan (2002)
