= Deepu Karunakaran =

Indian film director

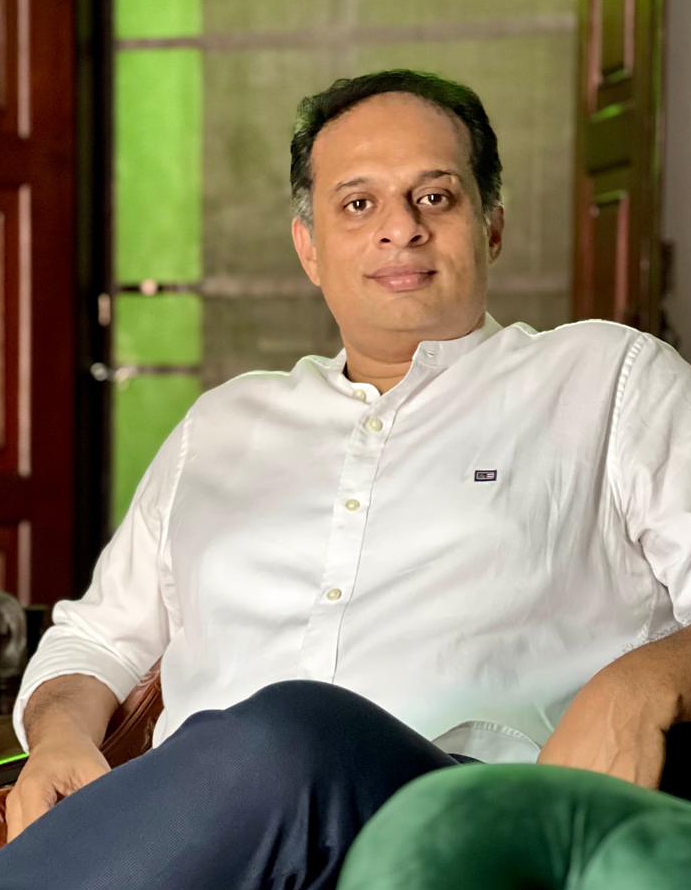
- Born: 13 July 1977 (age 49); Trivandrum, Kerala, India
- Occupation: Film director
- Spouse: Archana Mohan (m. 2015)
- Relatives: Suchitra Murali (sister)

Deepu Karunakaran is an Indian film director, writer, producer and actor who works in Malayalam cinema. He debuted as a director with the movie Winter (filmed in 2003; released in 2009). His first movie in theatres was Crazy Gopalan, starring Dileep, in 2008.

== Career ==
Prior to becoming an independent filmmaker, Deepu apprenticed as an assistant director under the ace Director Priyadarshan. His first released film was in 2008, the thriller comedy Crazy Gopalan starring Dileep in the titular role. The movie opened to commercial success. The first film he actually directed was the horror thriller Winter with Jayaram in the lead, which was released subsequently in 2009. His third film was a comedy Teja Bhai and Family starring Prithviraj in the lead, released in 2011 to commercial success. He directed the 2015 thriller Fireman starring Mammootty, which was a success critically and commercially. His 5th movie Karinkunnam 6s, a sports movie with Manju Warrier in the lead, was released in 2016. A few of his big-budgeted PAN India movies with top artistes in the Industry, planned after 2016, could not be materialized due to COVID-19 pandemic and its aftermath. Venturing into acting and production in the post-COVID period, Deepu once again donned the cap of a Director in 2023 with "Mr & Mrs Bachelor" that's scheduled to release in August 2024.

He ventured into acting, with the Malayalam feature film "Kakkipada" (2022). He became a Producer with "Njan Kandatha Sare" (due for release in 2024). Deepu currently heads his own movie production house "Lemon Productions", established in 2024. Besides handling own productions, it functions as a Line Production house, which facilitates end-to-end production of movies.

== Personal life ==
Deepu Karunakaran is married to Archana Mohan. The couple were married in Trivandrum on the 17 January 2015. He is also the brother of actress Suchitra Murali.

== Filmography ==
Year	Film	Role	Cast	Notes
2008	Crazy Gopalan	Director, Writer	Dileep, Salim Kumar, Manoj K. Jayan	
2009	Winter	Director	Jayaram, Bhavana	
2011	Teja Bhai & Family	Director	Prithviraj Sukumaran, Akhila Sasidharan, Suman,Suraj Venjaramoodu	
2015	Fireman	Director	Mammootty, Nyla Usha, Unni Mukundan , Salim Kumar	
2016	Karinkunnam 6S	Director	Manju Warrier, Anoop Menon, Babu Antony, Suraj Venjaramoodu	
2022	Kakkipada	Actor	Sarath Kumar, Niranj Maniyanpilla Raju, Sujith Shankar	
2023	Kadina Kadoramee Andakadaham	Actor	Basil Joseph, Parvathy R Krishna, Indrans, Jaffar Idukki	
2023	Thimingala Vetta	Actor	Jagadish, Vijayaraghavan, Anoop Menon, Ramesh Pisharody	
2024	Njan Kandatha Sare	Producer, Actor	Indrajith Sukumaran, Baiju Santhosh, Anoop Menon, Mareena	
2025	Mr & Mrs Bachelor	Director, Co-producer, Actor	Indrajith Sukumaran, Anaswara Rajan	
2026	Sathyameva †	Director, Actor	Rony David Raj, Binny Sebastian, Meenakshi Unnikrishnan	ZEE5 series
