= Uday Ananthan =

Indian filmmaker

- Born: Thrissur, Kerala, India
- Occupations: Film director, screenwriter
- Years active: 1991–
- Spouse: Jesny

Uday Ananthan is an Indian filmmaker who works in Malayalam cinema. He is best known for his 2007 film, Pranayakalam, and Mrityunjayam, a short film, which is part of the 2009 Malayalam anthology film, Kerala Cafe. In July 2016, his third directorial feature, White, starring Mammootty and Huma Qureshi was released.

== Filmography ==
- Pranayakalam (2007)
- Mrityunjayam (2009) (short film)
- White (2016)
