= Body doubling =

Strategy of completing tasks with another person

Body doubling or parallel working is a strategy used to initiate and complete tasks, such as household chores or writing and other computer tasks. It involves the physical presence, virtual presence through a phone call, videotelephony or social media presence, of someone with whom one shares their goals, which makes it more likely to achieve them. For some people, it works best to both do similar tasks, while for others, just being in the same (real or virtual) room is enough.

It was partially popularized by those with attention deficit hyperactivity disorder (ADHD) to help manage symptoms. Its usefulness has also been noted by those with autism, but efficacy is not clearly known as long-term studies have not been conducted on the topic. In 2023, J. Russel Ramsay, professor of clinical psychiatry at the Perelman School of Medicine and co-director of the ADHD treatment and research program of the University of Pennsylvania, noted that, while extensive research on the strategy's effect on productivity doesn't exist, "the idea of externalizing motivation is a longstanding evidence-based mechanism for managing ADHD."

ADHD body doubling allows individuals with ADHD to perform and complete tasks more easily and with fewer distractions, where otherwise they might struggle more. The Attention Deficit Disorder Association has said, "ADHD body doubling is a productivity strategy used by individuals with ADHD to finish possibly annoying jobs while having another person beside them."

Body doubling is said to aid individuals with focus and productivity while working. Another person, known as a "body double", sits alongside the individual with ADHD to help them focus while completing a certain task. The role of this individual is to not partake in the task, but to serve as a support system and create a welcoming environment that allows the individual to focus by reducing any distractions. The idea of body doubling allows for specific reminders to the individual to stay on task, which helps alleviate the symptoms of ADHD.

== History ==
The notion of body doubling derives from the cognitive behavioral therapy (CBT) techniques which focus on assisting those with cognitive disorders. The term "body doubling" was coined in 1996 by Linda Anderson, an ADHD coach and former president of the Attention Deficit Disorder Association (ADDA). Body doubling was first used to alleviate anxiety and improve concentration; recently, it has gained popularity as a way to promote concentration in multiple settings such as schools, home-working environments, and occupations. It has gained attention through social media platforms like TikTok and YouTube, which has videos and livestreams to work alongside. There are also paid platforms and groups on social media to schedule body doubling sessions.

Individuals with ADHD often have educational accommodations such as extra time on exams, preferred seating, and breaking down tasks into various steps. The concept of body doubling has been recognized as a new viable option for these pre-existing accommodations. The concept of having an individual close by to provide clear guidance and encouragement will allow the individual with ADHD to stay focused on a particular task should they be partaking in more than one task. It is important that the body double does not distract the other person with conversation or anything else.

== Methodology ==
The individual and body double list specific tasks that they want to complete in a certain amount of time. The body double does not necessarily need to sit shoulder to shoulder with the individual but should provide a calming, nurturing, and quiet presence. The individual is advised not to switch tasks and solely stay focused and work on the task that was assigned.

Some benefits of body doubling include increasing the individual's accountability and motivation, and decreasing feelings of isolation. It allows for subtle reinforcement to prevent procrastination and create consistency towards their goals. According to one director of an ADHD counseling practice, "The idea is that the presence of another is essentially a gentle reminder to stay on task ... For folks [with] ADHD whose minds tend to wander and get off task, the body double somehow works as an external motivator to stay on task." Most importantly, the body double creates a safe and accepting environment where the individual feels the symptoms of ADHD much less; such as criticism or failure.

The demands of a body double can range on a spectrum. Some need to check in with the person for accountability, while others work in public or online spaces with the people around them serving as unaware body doubles. However, the main mechanism body doubling involves a feeling of responsibility, where not completing the task would let their body double down instead of themselves, which may motivate them more than completing it for themselves.

== Applications ==
Body doubling is not used solely for individuals with ADHD. It is now widely used as part of therapeutic settings to assist individuals with autism, anxiety disorders, and other conditions influenced by functioning deficits.

This concept is not structured solely for students but for professionals and any individuals who are looking to enhance and optimize their performance. Asking for and applying a body double may come across as awkward; however, one could say, "It's something I heard can help with productivity. Would you mind just being around me while I work on this? Maybe you have something you could work on, too."

Examples of body doubling could include someone asking a person to be on Zoom while they work on something, doing chores while on the phone with a friend, or joining a study group while preparing for a test.

=== Use in higher education. ===
Body doubling is a starter used by some college students, particularly those with ADHD, to help them manage studying and completing assignments. students can work side by side in classrooms, in groups or on a virtual call. Researchers has shown that body doubling helps maintain accountability and help them remain focus. although students reports that they find this helpful, more research is needed to determine effectivness and their academic performance.

=== Use of technological alternatives ===
Emerging studies are examining the use of technological alternatives to recreate the possible positive effects of body doubling. There has been relative success regarding robots, chatbots, and extended reality. The results have varied due to individuals having different preferences for the functions of a body double, but they aim to provide an alternative for those who have social anxiety or are unable to find body doubles. A technological alternative may not generate the same need for accountability since the relationship lacks the human bond body doubling hinges on.

== Criticism and limitations ==
While body doubling has been seen as an effective tool for alleviating the symptoms of ADHD, many factors come into play in determining whether it is as effective as it is said to be. A variety of factors such as personality types, individual preferences, and the types of tasks at hand can influence the effectiveness of body doubling. It is not recommended to use body doubling solely on its own and should be used along with other coping skills to address different aspects of ADHD. Additionally, relying solely on a body double to complete tasks may impact the individual's ability to develop individual working and coping strategies in the future.

Research on body doubling is lacking since it is a new area of study, with most being limited to master's theses. Its efficacy is mainly promoted through personal anecdotes, especially on social media platforms. The efficacy of body doubling also varies from person to person, as one study found body doubling was ineffective due to people possibly needing to have a bond with their body double. A body double could also serve as a distraction or make the person self-conscious, which decreases work effectiveness and attention.
