= Joshua Newton (writer) =

Indian writer

- Born: 2 August 1969 (age 57); Kerala, India
- Occupations: Founder of The Bliss Work®, Editor of The Bliss Work Magazine, Wisdom Teacher, Author, Screenwriter, Filmmaker, Storyteller
- Website: blisswork.org

Joshua Newton (born 1969 in Kerala, India) is a contemplative writer based in India. A former journalist, Newton is also a screenwriter and an author of spiritual fiction and creative non-fiction.

== Biography ==
Joshua Newton is an international award-winning contemplative writer based in India. Two of his screenplays, Ritu and Offseason (Kerala Cafe) were made into films by the national award-winning filmmaker Shyamaprasad in India (former in Malayalam and Telugu and latter in Malayalam).

His non-fiction and journalism have appeared in over 60 publications around the world. His first book of creative nonfiction, The Book of People: Ten Life Reports From India explores lives of ten 'ordinary' Indians in the grand tradition of Joseph Mitchell and John McPhee.

His book Soul Biscuits : Tiny Bites For Truthful Living was published on Amazon by Bodhy Studios. Reviewers describe Newton's spiritual thriller 'The Boy on the Blue Mountain' as 'engrossing', and 'magical'.

He is also the recipient of 2005 Evangelical Press Association award (second) in Interview Article section for "She Chose to Forgive", the feature story on Gladys Staines published in Charisma magazine, and the 2004 Luis Valtuena VII International Humanitarian Photography Award (Special Prize) from Médicos del Mundo a major global NGO based in Spain. He is the first Asian to win these honours.

His critically acclaimed short story, Taj Mahal, was published by Rupa Publications in the collection of modern Indian fiction named Why We Don't Talk.

Before turning full-time to creative writing, he worked fourteen years as a journalist and reported from India for over 60 print and web publications around the world. He has also been the features editor of Men's Health (India), UAE Digest (Dubai Media City), a rewrite editor with Business World, and the coordinating editor of New Indian Express (Kerala). Over the two decades he has written on a wide variety of themes ranging from underworld goon to Indian textiles.

He currently runs The Bliss Commune to teach the Science of Being based on A Course in Miracles and edits The Bliss Work® Magazine.
