= Malabar Wedding =

- Directed by: Rajesh Faisal
- Written by: Ramesh Madhavan
- Produced by: K. B. Devarajan; T. Santhosh Kumar
- Starring: Indrajith Sukumaran; Gopika
- Cinematography: Vel Raj
- Edited by: Arun Kumar
- Music by: Rahul Raj
- Release date: 24 March 2008
- Country: India
- Language: Malayalam

Malabar Wedding is a 2008 Indian Malayalam-language comedy film directed by the Rajesh-Faisal duo and written by Ramesh Madhavan. It has Indrajith Sukumaran and Gopika in the lead roles. The story is based on a custom called Sorakalyanam which is prevalent in some parts of Malabar in Kerala. In this custom, before the marriage, friends have fun with the bride and groom, by making false stories and playing practical jokes upon them. Rahul Raj scored the music for this film.

== Plot ==
A wedding planner 'Thaaraavu' Manikkuttan and his friends always have fun at their friends' by putting the bride or groom in difficult positions. Often they play pranks on them, in turn humiliating them and laughing at their expense. Everyone knows that they will be at the receiving end, one day.

When Manikkuttan marries Smitha, his friends take revenge on them in the same fashion in which they were fooled. They mix alcohol in the soft drink which was given to Manikkuttan. He gets intoxicated and makes a mess when Smitha's parents arrive at their home. Later at night, they place a small firecracker next to their bedroom to disturb them during their first night. When the firecracker explodes, some unexpected events happen, and Smitha is found bleeding and unconscious in the bedroom, with her arm cut.

Smitha is hospitalized, and her parents blame it on Manikkuttan. Manikkuttan and his friends feel sorry for her. But Smitha reveals that it was not a suicide attempt: Her hand was cut by accident when her brother came and visited them at night and tried to kill Manikkuttan. Manikkuttan learns that she has a brother, who was adopted by her parents at a very young age and was very possessive about his sister. In the fear of losing his sister, he had already interfered with one marriage, thus making the bride withdraw from it. Smitha tells Manikkkuttan that she loves her brother very much, and she misses him badly. Her brother overhears that and becomes happy leaving them to live their lives.

== Cast ==
- Indrajith Sukumaran as 'Thaaraavu' Maanukkuttan
- Gopika as Smitha
- Suraj Venjaramood as 'Pookkatta' Satheesan
- Janardhanan as Paappan
- T. P. Madhavan as Thampi
- Mamukkoya as Moonga Avukkar Abubacker
- Manianpilla Raju as Unni
- Kiran Raj as Bhaskaran
- M. R. Gopakumar
- K. T. S. Padannayil as Maman (as Padannayil)
- Machan Varghese as Purushu
- Bijukuttan as 'Irumpan' Sadu
- Atlas Ramachandran as Sreeraman
- Santhosh Jogi as 'Choonda' Sugunan
- Sajith Raj as Devan
- Zeenath
- Manka Mahesh as Madhavi
- Ambika Mohan as Smitha's mother
- Lakshmi Priya
- T. N. Gopakumar as himself
- Mahesh
- Geetha Salam

== Music ==
1. "Malabar Wedding" - Vijesh Gopal, Shyam Shiva
2. "Bayye Bayye" - Afsal, Franco
3. "Kolusaal Konchum" - Manjari, Vidhu Prathap
4. "Kolusal Konchum" - Manjari, Rahul Raj
