= Crazy Gopalan =

2008 film by Deepu Karunakaran

- Theatrical release poster
- Directed by: Deepu Karunakaran
- Written by: Deepu Karunakaran
- Produced by: Ulattil Sasi
- Starring: Dileep; Salim Kumar; Jagathy Sreekumar
- Edited by: Manoj
- Music by: Score: Rajamani; Songs: Rahul Raj
- Production company: Bhavana Mediavision
- Distributed by: Ullattil Visual Media Release
- Release date: 23 December 2008
- Country: India
- Language: Malayalam

Crazy Gopalan is a 2008 Indian Malayalam-language heist action comedy film written & directed by Deepu Karunakaran (in his directorial debut). The film stars Dileep in the title role with Salim Kumar, Jagathy Sreekumar, Manoj K. Jayan, Radha Varma and Biju Menon in pivotal roles. The film was produced and distributed by Ullattil Visual Media. Story, screenplay and dialogues are handled by Deepu Karunakaran.The film was a commercial success at the box office.

The story revolves around two thieves Gopalan (Dileep) and Lakshmanan (Salim Kumar) and challenges faced by Gopalan after the death of Lakshmanan.

== Plot ==
Kattila Gopalan is a notorious name in the village Oonjaalaadi. Though nobody has seen Gopalan, people hold him in dread as he is a thief who always manages to steal whatever he wants, without ever getting caught or even being seen by anyone. His identity remains a mystery.

Then one day Harichandran, a carpenter happens to see Gopalan for the first time. Gopalan is thus forced to flee the little village and seeks refuge in the city. There he meets Lakshmanan, another thief who has an ailing mother to look after. They form a team and start thieving, Lakshmanan to treat his mother and Gopalan with an aim to buy back his ancestral house which he has lost in his childhood. And then a girl named Diana and her brother Babu John, a rich banker and the chairman of Investors Bank, come into the lives of Gopalan and Lakshmanan.

Babu John steals 10 crore rupees from Investors Bank and blames Gopalan and Lakshmanan. Lakshmanan gets killed by Babu John while Gopalan manages to escape. Then people spread rumours that Gopalan killed Lakshmanan and gone away with the money. Lavang Vasu finds Gopalan's body on the seashore and hoping that he could get some money, he takes Gopalan to his house only to find out that Gopalan does not have money. Gopalan then teams up with Vasu and promised him to give the amount he needed. One day, Gopalan finds Diana in a church. When he caught her red handed, she revealed her past. She didn't actually like Babu John as he killed her parents and boyfriend Sooraj. Babu John was actually her adopted brother.

Gopalan then plans with Diana to kill Babu John without any proof. At first, he robs the Investors Bank brilliantly with the help of Vasu. Now, Babu John is heartbroken. The new Commissioner Vinod Abraham tries to resolve the case and is now on a mission to find Gopalan. He unknowingly takes Harichandran to police station as they thought he was Gopalan. As Harichandran was firm that he was not Gopalan, the police officer calls Chacko KT, the assistant of Babu John. He says that Harichandran is Gopalan. Then Harichandran on seeing Gopalan's photo reveals the truth.

Vinod plans to catch Gopalan with Harichandran's help and he does while coming from a shopping center. Even though the police chased Gopalan, he tactically escaped and planned another way with Diana where she acted as if she made him caught red handed by police to accompany Babu John. This was in order to find out the hidden bars of gold which were hidden in a place that only Babu John and Chacko knew. However, when her plans go in vain, she informs this to Gopalan. Gopalan then thought of another trick to use Chacko in order to find gold bars and black money.

As planned, Diana had informed that Babu John would ruin Chacko's family indirectly. Feared Chacko goes to file a case to the Vinod regarding the place where the black money and gold were hidden. Babu John arrives from Singapore and he gets caught by the police. However, Diana cheats Babu John and takes him to the a place where Gopalan was waiting for him. Even though Gopalan was brutally beaten up first, he recalls Babu John killing Lakshmanan and musters up strength. He fights back and kills Babu John in the same place where he killed Lakshmanan with the help of Vasu. He calls Vinod and informs in Babu John's sound that Babu John had gone to a safe place.

Gopalan, along with Diana and Vasu goes back to Oonjaladi village where he is surprised to learn that Kattila Gopalan over there is Harichandran.

== Cast ==
- Dileep as Ambadi Gopalan Nair (Kattila Gopalan)
- Salim Kumar as Lakshmanan
- Jagathy Sreekumar as Lavang Vasu
- Harisree Ashokan as Hari Chandran (Kattila Gopalan)
- Manoj K. Jayan as Babu John
- Biju Menon as Commissioner Vinod Abraham IPS
- Radha Varma as Diana John
- Mohan Jose as Chacko K.T
- Kollam Thulasi as SI Pushkaran
- Janardhanan as Narayana Kurup, Panchayat President
- Kochu Preman as Ananthan
- Indrans as Sugunan, soldier
- Kozhikode Shantha Devi as Lakshmanan's mother
- Kalabhavan Shajohn as SI Arjun Nair
- Sadiq as Ambadi Krishnan, Gopalan's father
- Kalabhavan Haneef as Pushpan
- Narayanan Kutty
- Rani Larius as Clara, Chacko's wife
- Manju Satheesh as Nancy, Babu's wife
- Solomon Changanacherry as Drunkard
- Unni S Nair as Villager
- Machan Varghese as Bhaskaran
- Kannan Pattambi as the Astrologer Shankaran
- Kozhikode Narayanan Nair as Judge
- Geetha Salam as the school principal
- Madhu Warrier as Sooraj (cameo)
- Arun Bobby as a boy sitting on the wall while Babu John's car passes by

== Production ==
Samantha Ruth Prabhu had attended the screen test for the lead female role, but was rejected. Deepu later recalled that she did not satisfied the height requirement.

== Music ==
The songs of this movie were composed by Rahul Raj. The film had 3 songs, out of which 2 of them appeared in the movie.

=== Track listing ===
Song	Duration	Singers
"Gopala Gokulapala"	03:29	Shankar Mahadevan
"Yudham Thudangi"	02:25	Rahul Raj
"Hay Lelo"	04:42	Sunitha Sarathy
