= Kunchan =

Kunchan is a given name. Notable people with the name include:

- Kunchan Nambiar (1705–1770), 18th-century satirist from Kerala who was the originator of Ottamthullal
- Kunchan (born 1952), Indian actor appearing primarily in Malayalam films
