= Mamas K. Chandran =

Indian film director

Mamas Ramachandran
- Born: Idukki
- Occupation: Film maker
- Parent(s): Ramachandran,Sukumari

Mamas Ramachandran, better known as Mamas, is an Indian film director, screenwriter, and caricaturist. He made his directorial debut in 2010 with Paappi Appacha.

== Career life ==
Mamas started his career by assisting veteran directors I V Sasi and duo Rafi Mecartin. Mamas's directorial debut was Paappi Appacha starring Dileep and Kavya Madhavan. His second directorial venture- Cinema Company starred mainly newcomers selected through audition across Kerala. Mannar Mathai Speaking 2, his third movie was a sequel to Mannar Mathai Speaking directed by duo Siddique-Lal 25 years ago.

== Filmography ==
Year	Title	Language	Credits		
Year	Title	Language	Director	Story	Script
2010	Paappi Appacha	Malayalam	Yes	Yes	Yes
2012	Cinema Company	Malayalam	Yes	Yes	Yes
2014	Mannar Mathai Speaking 2	Malayalam	Yes	Yes	Yes
