= Mathukkutty =

Indian radio/TV personality (born 1985)

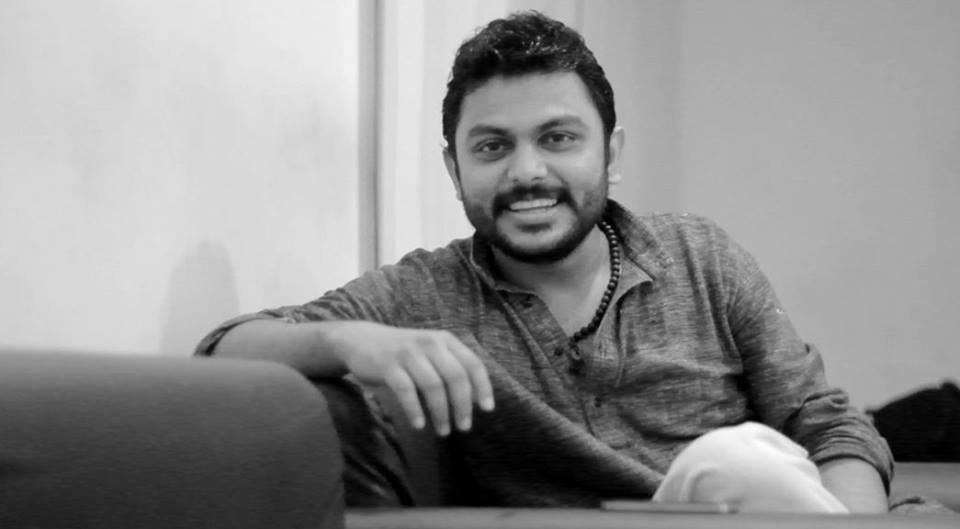
- Born: Arun Mathew; 27 February 1985 (age 41); Perumbavoor, Kerala, India
- Education: Union Christian College, Aluva
- Occupations: Radio jockey; TV host; journalist; director; screenwriter
- Years active: 2007–present
- Spouse: Dr.Elizabeth Shaji Madathil

Arun Mathew (born 27 February 1985), better known by his stage name Mathukkutty, is an Indian radio jockey, television host, actor and director. He is known for his association with the Malayalam television shows on One TV, Mazhavil Manorama, Flowers, Zee Keralam, Surya TV and for his role in the Malayalam film Ithihasa, Campus Diary, Kamuki and Hridayam. His debut film as director was Kunjeldho.

== Early life ==
Arun Mathew (Mathukutty) was born on 27 February 1985. He was raised in West Vengola, Perumbavoor, Ernakulam to Mathukutty and Sosamma. He completed his bachelor's degree in Malayalam from the Union Christian College, Aluva in 2006. He joined Kerala Media Academy in Kakkanad for a Postgraduate Diploma in Journalism. He started his career as editor trainee at Malayalam newspaper Veekshanam. He came to radio as a hobby and ended up as a radio host.

== Career ==
=== Radio ===
RJ Mathukkutty started his career as a radio jockey on Red FM in 2007. He was working in Red FM, Thiruvananthapuram as a Radio Jockey and program producer for the shows. He was well known during his RJ career for presenting "Love On Air" and "Red Carpet". Later on, in 2017, after completing 9 years in radio, he left Red FM and joined Gold FM as Celebrity interviewer till late 2017.

=== Television ===
R J Mathukkutty debuted in television as celebrity interviewer in Surya TV.Later proceeded as anchor for 'Kutty Kalavara', a cookery show for children on Flowers TV in 2015. He became quite popular after co hosting 'Dhe Chef', a cookery based reality show aired on Mazhavil Manorama in 2016 in mazhavil manorama. He was the co anchor of 'Udan Panam Season 1', an outdoor Game show which is being aired on Mazhavil Manorama Currently he was the co anchor of "Udanpanam Season 2" and also the co host of "Europil Parann Parann Parann"- A Travelogue based on European Countries, both with "Raj Kalesh".

=== Feature films ===
R J Mathukkutty debuted in Malayalam films as the dialogue writer for the movie You Too Brutus, in 2015. The film and the catchy dialogues in the movie both were widely accepted by the crowd. He has also done guest roles in various Malayalam movies including "Ithihasa" "Kamuki". He has done a notable role in 2016 Malayalam movie Campus Diary directed by Jeevan Das. He had his directorial debut with the movie Kunjeldho in 2021 which was also written by him.

=== Short films ===
Mathukkutty has played the lead roles in Malayalam short films named "Kuliscene" directed by Rahul K Shaji in 2013 and "Bedroom" in 2015 directed by Sanjay Markose. He has also made a guest appearance in "Kozhibiriyani" in 2013. Later in 2017, he also played the leading role in the short film "Sorry" directed by Benjith Baby which attained wide viewer acceptance. He also appeared as a cameo in Mattoru Kadavil, sequel of Kuliscene Shortfilm

== Awards ==
- Radio Active Bright Bulb Award for Red Carpet (2013)
- Radio Active Best Cupid Show Award for Love on Air (2013)
- Flash on Media Best RJ of the Year Award (2012)
- Media Awards Popular Anchor for Udanpanam (2019)

== Filmography ==
=== Short films ===
List of short film credits
Year	Title	Role	Director	Notes
2013	Kuliscene	Sunny	Rahul K Shaji	Acting Debut
2013	Kozhibiriyani		Fawaz/Vishnu	
2014	Bedroom		Sanjayan Marcose	
2018	Sorry		Benjith Baby	
2020	Mattoru Kadavil, Kuliscene 2	Sunny	Rahul K Shaji	Cameo

=== Web series ===
List of web series credits
Year	Title	Notes
2021	Kili	Actor

=== Feature films ===
Year	Title	Role	Director	Notes
2012	Ustad Hotel	Actor	Anwar Rasheed	Cameo
2013	Neelakasham Pachakadal Chuvanna Bhoomi	Actor	Sameer Thahir	
2014	Ithihasa	Actor	Binu Sadanandan	
2014	Sapthamashree Thaskaraha	Actor	Anil Radhakrishnan Menon	
2015	Lord Livingstone 7000 Kandi	Actor	Anil Radhakrishnan Menon	
2016	Campus Diary	Actor	Jeevan	
2018	Kamuki	Actor	Binu Sadanandan	
2021	Kunjeldo	Director	Mathukkutty	Debut as director
2022	Hridayam	Actor	Vineeth Sreenivasan	Cameo as priest

=== As dubbing artist ===
List of dubbing credits
Year	Title	Director	Notes
2014	Koothara	Srinath Rajendran	
2015	Oru Vadakkan Selfie	Prajith	

=== As dialogue writer ===
List of dialogue writing credits
Year	Title	Director
2015	You Too Brutus	Roopesh Peethambaran

== Television ==
List of television credits
Year	Title	Role	Channel
2015	On the spot	Host	One TV
2015-2016	Kuttykalavara	Host	Flowers TV
2016	Dhe Chef	Co-host	Mazhavil Manorama
2017–2018	Udan Panam	Co-host	Mazhavil Manorama
2017	Midukki	Co-host	Mazhavil Manorama
2017–2019	Talk Time with Mathukutty	Host	YouTube
2018–2019	Udan Panam season 2	Co-host	Mazhavil Manorama
2018–2019	Europpil Parannu Parannu	Co-host	Mazhavil Manorama
2020	Suryajodi No.1	Co-Host	Surya TV
2020-2021	Let's Rock and Roll	Co-Host	Zee Keralam
2021	Manjubhavangal	Co-Host	Zee Keralam
2021	Madhuram Shobhanam	Co-Host	Zee Keralam
2022	Adichu Mone	Co-Host/Mathukutty	Flowers TV
2022	Orukodi Kilukkam	Co-Host	Flowers TV
2022–Present	Samsthanasammelanam	Host	Flowers TV
2022–Present	innathe chintavishayam	Host	Flowers TV
