= Tom Emmatty =

Indian film director, Screen writer and Actor

- Born: October 15, 1979
- Education: Christ College, Irinjalakuda
- Occupations: Film director, Screen writer, Actor
- Years active: 2015–present

Tom Emmatty is an Indian film director, screenwriter and actor working in Malayalam cinema. Emmatty's debut film Oru Mexican Aparatha, collected more than 20cr from release centers.

== Personal life ==
Tom Emmatty was born in Mattom, a village in Thrissur district, Kerala.

== Film career ==
Emmatty started working in the film industry as an assistant director for Roopesh Peethambaran’s You Too Brutus. His film Oru Mexican Aparatha is based on the campus politics of Maharaja's College, Ernakulam, Kerala. Oru Mexican Aparatha features Tovino Thomas, Roopesh Peethambaran, Kalabhavan Shajon and Neeraj Madhav in lead roles. Tom's next movie was The Gambler which features Anson Paul, and Emmatty's son George Emmatty in a lead role. Emmatty's upcoming movie is Duniyavinte Orattathu which features Sudhi Koppa, Sreenath Bhasi and Anu Sithara in lead roles.

== Filmography ==
Year	Title	Credited as		Notes
Year	Title	Writer	Director	Notes
2017	Oru Mexican Aparatha	Yes	Yes	Debut movie
2019	The Gambler	Yes	No	
TBA	Dhuniyavinte Orattathu	Yes	—N/a	Shooting in process
