= Aswathy Sreekanth =

Indian actress

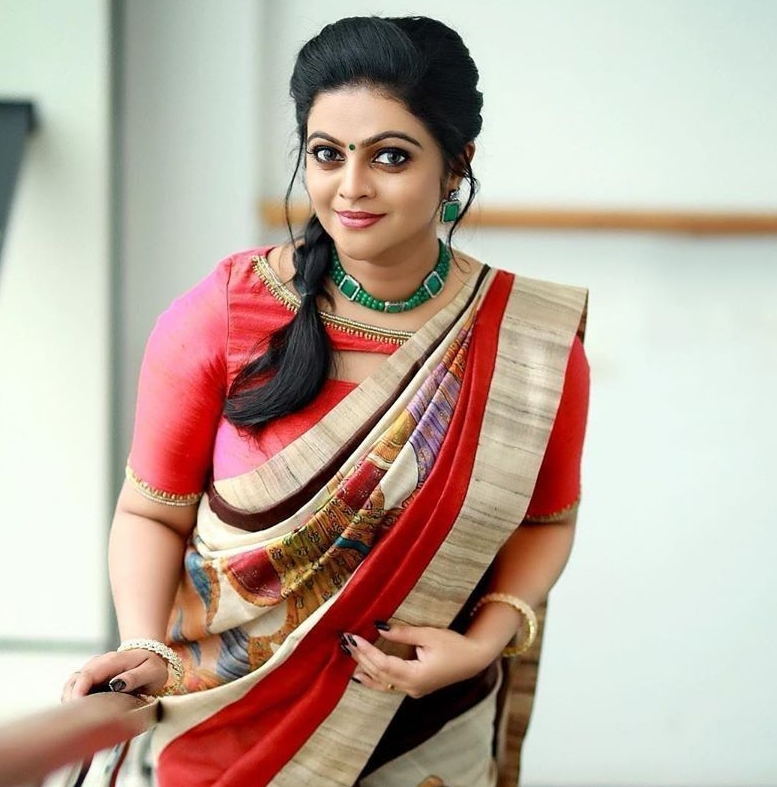
- Born: Aswathy Ashok; Thodupuzha, Kerala, India
- Education: Alphonsa College, Palai
- Occupations: Actress; writer; presenter
- Spouse: Sreekanth T. S (m. 2012)
- Children: 2

YouTube information
- Channel: Life Unedited - Aswathy Sreekanth
- Years active: 2011–present
- Genres: Lifestyle, Motivation, Couple Vlogs
- Subscribers: 486 thousand
- Views: 117 million
- Last updated: 2 November 2025

Aswathy Sreekanth is an Indian television actress, television host, writer and YouTuber from Kerala. She is best known for her portrayal of Asha Uthaman in Chakkappazham. She received the Kerala State Television Award for Best Actress in 2020 for Chakkappazham.

== Personal life ==
On 23 August 2012, Aswathy is married to her long time boyfriend Sreekanth T. S. The couple has two daughters. In March 2021, she announced her second pregnancy. She gave birth to her second daughter in August 2021.

== Career ==
Aswathy started her career in 2010 as radio personality at Red FM 93.5 based in Kochi. After her marriage, she moved to Dubai. Aswathy began writing her first memoir, Tta yillatha Muttayikal, in 2017. The book is semi-autobiographical and a major part captures her childhood experiences in Thodupuzha. Aswathy started her YouTube channel in 2021.

== Published works ==
- Sreekanth, Aswathy. (11 January 2024). Kaali (7th ed.). Kerala, India: DC Books. ISBN 9789357327312.
- Sreekanth, Aswathy. (28 February 2021). "Tta" yillatha Muttayikal (6th ed.). Kerala, India: Saikatham Books. ISBN 9789386222473.
- Sreekanth, Aswathy. (1 January 2018). Mazhayurumbukalude Rajyam (1st ed.). Kerala, India: Saikatham Books. ISBN 978-9388343268.

== Filmography ==
=== As actor ===
Key
†	Denotes films that have not yet been released

Year	Film	Role	Notes
2019	Puzhikkadakan	TV Host	Debut Movie
2021	Kunjeldho	Kala Teacher	
2023	Theeppori Benny	Dincy	
2024	Mandakini	Ajitha	
2024	Sambhava Sthalathu Ninnum	Collector	
2025	Flask	Nisha	

=== As lyricist ===
Year	Song	Film	Notes
2021	Farewell Song	Kunjeldho	Debut as Lyricist
2021	Pen Poove	Kunjeldho	

== Television ==
=== As actor ===
Year	Title	Role	Channel	Ref.
2020–2024	Chakkappazham	Asha Uthaman	Flowers TV	

=== TV shows ===
Year	Title	Role	Channel	Notes	Ref.
2015-2016	Comedy Super Nite	Co-Host (with Suraj Venjaramoodu)	Flowers TV	TV Debut	
2015	Smart Show	Participant	Flowers		
2016-2017	Malayali Veettamma	Co-Host (With Sanju Sivram	Flowers TV		
2017-2018	Comedy Super Nite 3	Co-Host (With Suraj Venjaramoodu)	Flowers TV		
2017	Flowers TV Awards	Host	Flowers TV		
2018	Flowers Indian Film Awards 2018	Host	Flowers TV		
2018	Sreekandan Nair Show	Co-Host (With Sreekandan Nair)	Flowers TV	Guinness World Record Special episode	
2018	Comedy Masala	Host	Amrita TV		
2018	Nayika Nayakan	Co-Host (with Dain Davis)	Mazhavil Manorama	Replaced Pearle Maaney	
2018	News	News reader	Twenty Four		
2019	Comedy Nights with Suraj	Co-Host (with Suraj Venjaramoodu)	Zee Keralam		
2019	Padam Namukku Padam	Host	Mazhavil Manorama	Replaced Addis Antony Akkara	
2019-2020	Ammayum Kunjum	Judge	Flowers TV		
2020–2021	Comedy Super Show	Host	Flowers TV		
2021	Samrambhaka	Host	Flowers TV	Replaced by Jewel Mary	
2022–Present	Kaliyalla Kalyanam	Host	YouTube	Web series chat show on Behindwood ice	
2022-2023	Njanum Entalum	Host	Zee Keralam		
2023	Flowers Oru Kodi	Participant	Flowers		
2023	Rasakadhanayakan Jayaram	Co-host	Amrita TV	Onam special show	

== Accolades ==
- 2020, Kerala State Television Award for Best Actress for Chakkappazham
