= Udan Panam =

Indian Malayalam television programme

- Genre: Game show
- Based on: Instant Cash by Cineflix
- Directed by: Abraham Chunkath
- Presented by: Raj Kalesh; Mathukkutty; Dain Davis; Meenakshi Raveendran; Suhaid Kukku; Venkitesh V. P.; Twinkle Sheethal
- Theme music composer: Rahul Raj
- Opening theme: "Udan Panam"
- Country of origin: India
- Original language: Malayalam
- No. of seasons: 5
- No. of episodes: 1001 (as combining all seasons)

Production
- Production location: Aroor
- Running time: 52 minutes

Original release
- Network: Mazhavil Manorama
- Release: 11 May 2017 – 9 November 2024

Udan Panam is an Indian Malayalam-language television game show. It is based on the Canadian show Instant Cash. The programme premiered on Mazhavil Manorama on 11 May 2017. The first two seasons of the show were hosted by Raj Kalesh and Mathukkutty. Dain Davis and Meenakshi Raveendran hosted the third and fourth seasons. Venkitesh V. P. and Twinkle Sheethal aired season 5 from 22 April 2024 to 9 November 2024. It is one of the longest running reality show in Malayalam.

== Hosts ==
Hosts	Seasons				
Hosts	1	2	3	4	5
Raj Kalesh	Main				Guest
Mathukkutty	Main				Guest
Dain Davis			Main		Guest
Meenakshi Raveendran			Main		Guest
Suhaid Kukku			Recurring		Guest
Venkitesh V. P.					Main
Twinkle Sheethal					Main

== Gameplay ==
Similar to the original series in Canada, a spurious ATM is set up at a grand court in a public centers in; there is no home base for most of the game. The contestant are asked a series of multiple choice questions, with four possible answers. Every answer they correctly provide adds money to their winnings; just one incorrect answer forces them out of the game, but they get the half of their previous winnings.

== Season overview ==
Season	No. of episodes	Originally broadcast (India)	
Season	No. of episodes	First aired	Last aired
1	108	11 May 2017	1 June 2018
'2	54	27 October 2018	
3	500	29 June 2020	31 December 2021
4	194	11 July 2022	1 April 2023
5	145	22 April 2024	9 November 2024

=== Season 1: 2017–18 ===
Udan Panam premiered on 17 May 2017 and was hosted by Raj Kalesh and Mathukkutty. The show initially offered contestants the chance to win 0.5 million Indian rupees. It feature participants from public gatherings and crowds, who will enroll themselves by answering the questions asked randomly by the hosts. The selected contestants will have to answer a series of general knowledge questions which will be displayed in front of them in an ATM screen. The show ended on 1 June 2018.

=== Season 2: 2019 ===
On 27 October 2019, the show premiered its second season. During this season, the show carried out the same format which features participants from the public who will be introduced to a set of simple questions and interesting tasks which challenge both their knowledge and spontaneity. The questions will be displayed in front of them in an ATM screen. The contestant who answers all the questions and successfully completes the given tasks gets to collect a cash prize from the ATM. There are several levels the contestant must cross to get to the big prize, and one wrong move can mean the end of the game.

=== Season 3: 2020–21 ===
Dain Davis and Nayika Nayakan fame Meenakshi Raveendran hosted the third season of the show, renamed as Udan Panam 3.0. It premiered on Mazhavil Manorama on 7 July 2020.

Earlier a travel-themed show, the show had an indoor set up in this season and participants were connected through video calls.

Dain was temporarily replaced by Sooraj Thelakkad and Suhail Kukku for a short period.

=== Season 4 ===
The fourth season of the show, renamed Udan Panam: Chapter 4 premiered on 11 July 2022 on Mazhavil Manorama. Dain Davis and Meenakshi Raveendran were retained as the hosts.

There were various rule changes made to the show during this season. Two different contestants competed together. The top prize amount was increased to ₹2.5 million. ₹1 million will be given to the contestants before beginning the game and ₹ 0.1 million for every correct answer. The prize money will be halved with every incorrect answer. It is not possible to withdraw from the competition halfway. Three lifelines were provided from which only one can be used that too only when both the contestants were willing.

== Gameplay ==
In the third season, The show has launched following all COVID-19 safety norms, and made it possible for contestants to play the game show from within their homes via video call and win instant cash. Udan Panam viewers can also win instant cash and other prizes by interacting with TV using the win along function on ManoramaMAX app (OTT media service). They can answer the questions asked to the contestants on show using ManoramaMAX app and earn points. The topper on the leader board at the end of the show will win the same cash amount as the contestant on the show.

To help them along the way, much like its counterparts, the contestant had a set of lifelines available for them to use. Which lifelines were available were dependent on the format being used. At the beginning the contestant will have to choose any two the following lifelines.

- Veettile Thaaram (The star of the House): The contestant could ask a single member present at their house to aid them in answering the question. Once connected, the aiding party and the contestant had few seconds to talk it out among themselves.
- Ashareeri: The ATM would remove two wrong answers from the game leaving the contestant one right and one wrong answer.
- Ithu Sheri-aavilla (This will not be OKAY): The ATM will change the question into another one, leaving the contestant to select the correct answer for the changed question.

The contestants have the option to quit the show which give them the offer to grab the entire prize money they had won. If answered wrong, however, results in winning only the half of the prize money they made and elimination from the game.

== Celebrity guests ==
=== Season 1 ===
Year	Guest(s)	Notes	Ref.
2018	Suresh Gopi	Special episode to raise funds for victims of the Ockhi Cyclone victims	

=== Season 3 ===
- Usha Uthup
- S. Sreesanth
- Manju Warrier and Sunny Wayne
- Ahaana Krishna and Krishna Kumar
- P. R. Sreejesh
- Divya Pillai

=== Season 5 ===
- Jayaram
- Dileep
- Unni Mukundan and Mahima Nambiar
