= The Gambler (2019 film) =

Indian Malayalam-language superhero film

- Official poster
- Directed by: Tom Emmatty
- Produced by: Thankachan Emmanuel
- Starring: Anson Paul; George Emmatty
- Music by: Manikandan Ayyappa; Gopi Sundar
- Release date: 9 May 2019
- Running time: 121 minutes
- Country: India
- Language: Malayalam

The Gambler is a 2019 Indian Malayalam-language comedy-drama film directed by Tom Emmatty (who directed Oru Mexican Aparatha) and starring Anson Paul and George Emmatty (director's son). The film is about a father, George, who appears in his son's dreams as a superhero, IO Man. The film was touted to be the first Malayalam superhero film.

== Plot ==
A father and son go through a series of struggles as they try to get what is important to them and live a happier life.

== Cast ==
- Anson Paul as Anson
- George Emmatty
- Dayyana Hameed
- Innocent
- Salim Kumar
- Vijayakumar
- Vishnu Govindan as Jomi
- Sijoy Varghese
- Roopesh Peethambaran
- Keanu Adduono as Investor
- Joseph Annamkutty Jose
- Jayaraj Warrier
- Aristo Suresh
- Rajini Chandy
- Sreelakshmy Ramshy
- Vidya Martin

== Release and reception ==
The film released on 9 May.

A critic from The Times of India gave 2/5 and wrote that "The film could sure have made a better impact if the treatment was well-thought-out". A critic from The New Indian Express gave a negative review. A critic from Deccan Chronicle opined that "At this time when Avengers Endgame is still going strong in the theatres, it would be an eye-opener for the director to watch what a superhero film actually entails".
