= Vivekanandan Viralanu =

2024 Indian Malayalam comedy drama film by Kamal

- Theatrical release poster
- Directed by: Kamal
- Written by: Kamal
- Produced by: Nediyath Naseeb; P.S.Shelliraj; Kamaludheen Saleem; (Co-producer); Suresh Sak (Co-producer)
- Starring: Shine Tom Chacko; Swasika Vijay; Grace Antony; Mareena
- Cinematography: Prakash Velayudhan
- Edited by: Ranjan Abraham
- Music by: Bijibal
- Production company: Nediyath Productions
- Distributed by: Magic Frames
- Release date: 19 January 2024
- Country: India
- Language: Malayalam

Vivekanandan Viralanu is a 2024 Indian Malayalam language comedy drama film, directed by Kamal, starring Shine Tom Chacko, Swasika Vijay, Grace Antony, Mareena and Johny Antony in lead roles. The principal photography of the film started on 15 June 2023.

The film marks the 100th screen appearance of actor Shine Tom Chacko and the return of director Kamal to filmmaking after a hiatus of five years.

The film was wrapped up on 25 July 2023 and released on 19 January 2024.

== Premise ==
Vivekanandan is a government employee with violent sexual urges and faces repercussions from his victims almost all the time. Fed up of his atrocities, his victims, who also include his wife and live-in partner, decide to teach him a lesson in consent. Interestingly, their revenge ends up going viral online and everyone gets to know about his deviant and predatory behavior.

== Cast ==
- Shine Tom Chacko as Vivekanandan S. Padmanabhan
- Swasika as Sithara
- Grace Antony as Diana
- Mareena as Aisha (Aishu)
- Manju Pillai as Ammini
- Johny Antony as S. Padmanabhan "Pappettan"
- Maala Parvathi as Savithri Teacher
- Sminu Sijo as CPO Mercy Mathew
- Sarath Sabha as Joppan
- Vineeth Thattil David as CI Hameed
- Sidhartha Siva as Dr. Mahalingeshwaran
- Pramod Velliyanad
- Neena Kurup
- Niyas Backer as CPO Jayan
- Sinoj Varghese as Paapi
- Josekutty as Sachidanandan S. Padmanabhan
- Remya Suresh as Lilly
- Ashitha Ashokan
- Majeed as Chief Minister
- Unni Raja as Rohith Eeshwar
- Riyas Narmakala as MLA Joseph John
- Ansha Mohan as Divya
- Radha Gomathi
- M. A. Nishad as Himself

== Production ==
The film was written and directed by Kamal. In an interview, he stated that the film addresses a contemporary issue affecting women that is not often discussed and explained that he cast actor Shine Tom Chacko in the lead role because he sought a performer without the burden of a major star image.

The cast includes Swasika Vijay, Grace Antony, Mareena Michael Kurisingal, Maala Parvathi, and Sminu Sijo, who portray women associated with the protagonist Vivekanandan. The film's distribution rights were acquired by producer Listin Stephen. It was produced by Nediyath Naseeb and P. S. Shelliraj, with Kamaludheen Saleem and Suresh Sak serving as co-producers.

The song "Oru Chillupaathram", performed by Sithara Krishnakumar, was released as the film's first single. Principal photography took place in Thodupuzha and Ernakulam.

== Reception ==
Anandu Suresh of The Indian Express wrote " The film serves as a misguided pamphlet written by men attempting to define feminism, women empowerment, rape, sexual perversion and social media without grasping the basics." While S. R. Praveen of The Hindu wrote " A loud, overdramatic take on an issue that the film fails to grasp"
