= Style (2016 film) =

2016 film by Binu Sadanandan

- Theatrical release poster
- Directed by: Binu Sadanandan
- Written by: Anil Narayanan; Dominic Arun
- Produced by: Rajesh Augustine
- Starring: Unni Mukundan; Tovino Thomas; Priyanka Kandwal; Balu Varghese; Shine Tom Chacko
- Narrated by: Lal
- Cinematography: Sinoj P. Ayyappan
- Edited by: Vivek Harshan
- Music by: Songs: Jassie Gift; Background Score: Rahul Raj
- Production company: CNC Film House
- Distributed by: LJ Films
- Release date: 2 January 2016 (India)
- Running time: 155 minutes
- Country: India
- Language: Malayalam

Style is a 2016 Indian Malayalam-language action thriller film directed by Binu Sadanandan starring Unni Mukundan, Tovino Thomas, Priyanka Kandwal, Balu Varghese, Master Ilhan and Shine Tom Chacko and in the leading roles. Mumbai-based model Priyanka Kandwal debuted as a heroine in the film. The film was released on 2 January 2016. the film was a commercial success.

== Premise ==
Tom, a young car tuner, falls in love with Diya. After a minor accident, a powerful don named Edgar comes into their lives. A rivalry between Tom and Edgar leads to Edgar's humiliation.

== Cast ==
- Unni Mukundan as Tom
- Tovino Thomas in a dual role as:
  - Edgar Kelly (Son)
  - Fletcher Kelly (Father)
- Priyanka Kandwal as Diya
- Balu Varghese as DiCaprio aka Kapra
- Ilhan as Jerry
- Vijayaraghavan as Stalin, Tom's and Jerry's father
- Rony David as Stephan
- Baiju Santhosh as Prakashan
- Manju Sathish as Tom's and Jerry's mother
- Dominic
- Pavithran as Advocate Eepan
- Santhosh Keezhattor as Diya's Father
- Noby as Gymman
- Stunt Silva as Martin
- Shine Tom Chacko as Alvy Benedict (cameo appearance)

== Production ==
The same team produced the movie Ithihasa. The film was announced in March 2015 and started its preliminary filming in July. Shooting occurred in two main sessions and was completed mid-November 2015. The film was released on 2 January 2016.

== Music ==
Style (2015)

Soundtrack album by Jassie Gift
- Released: 7 December 2015
- Language: Malayalam
- Label: Muzik247

The film has three songs composed by Jassie Gift. One of which, "Chenthamachundil," was particularly well received by audiences. The film also features a remixed version of a song from the 1977 movie Saritha, originally performed by K. J. Yesudas and remixed by Karthik. The background score of the film was composed, arranged and produced by Rahul Raj and released under the label Muzik247.

No.	Title	Lyrics	Singers	Duration
1	"Chenthamara Chundil"	Manu S. Manjith	Haricharan & Shweta Mohan	04:22
2	"Vennila Vannu Nee"	Harinarayanan B. K.	Benny Dayal & Suchithra	03:59
3	"Mazha Thulli Thulli"	Sathyan Anthikad	Karthik	03:52

== Reception ==
Sanjith Sidhardhan of The Times of India gave 2.5 out of 5 stars and stated that " Sinoj P Ayyappan has done a commendable job in presenting a captivating fare."
