= Comedy Nights with Suraj =

- Genre: Sketch comedy Chat show
- Presented by: Suraj Venjaramoodu; Aswathy Sreekanth
- Starring: Suraj Venjaramoodu; Aswathy Sreekanth
- Country of origin: India
- Original language: Malayalam

Production
- Camera setup: Multi-camera
- Running time: 43 minutes

Original release
- Network: Zee Keralam
- Release: 7 March – 28 June 2019

Related
- Comedy Nights with Kapil

Comedy Nights with Suraj was an Indian Malayalam stand-up comedy and talk show broadcast by Zee Keralam and hosted by Suraj Venjaramoodu and Aswathy Sreekanth. The show is an essence remake of popular Hindi language talk show The Kapil Sharma Show. The show ended on 28 June 2019 after 35 episodes.

== Plot summary ==
Comedian Suraj Venjaramoodu along with Aswathy Sreekanth interacts with celebrity guests about their latest films while keeping the audience laughing with their wit, humor and assorted skits. The show also features various individuals from different walks of life who come together to showcase a wide range of talents and impress the audience with their skills.

== Cast ==
=== Host ===
- Suraj Venjaramoodu
- Aswathy Sreekanth

=== Recurring ===
- Naseer Sankranthi
- Sneha Sreekumar
- Rajesh Panavally
- Sudhi Kollam
- Ullas Panthalam
- Nelson

== List of Episodes ==
| Episode | Guest(s) | Telecast date | Featured promotion |
|---|---|---|---|
| 1 | Dileep | 7 March 2019 | Kodathi Samaksham Balan Vakeel |
| 2 | Nadirshah | 8 March 2019 | Mera Naam Shaji |
| 3 | Omar Lulu, Noorin Shereef | 14 March 2019 | Oru Adaar Love |
| 4 | Harisree Ashokan, Surabhi Santosh | 15 March 2019 | An International Local Story |
| 5 | Kalidas Jayaram, Aishwarya Lekshmi, Midhun Manuel Thomas | 21 March 2019 | Argentina Fans Kaattoorkadavu |
| 6 | Guinness Pakru, Madhav Ramadasan | 22 March 2019 | Ilayaraja |
| 7 | Askar Ali, Aneesh Gopal, Rahul Ramachandran | 28 March 2019 | Jeem Boom Bhaa |
| 8 | Dhruvan, Gayathri Suresh, Vishnu Unnikrishnan, Manasa Radhakrishnan, Sowmya Menon | 29 March 2019 | Children's Park |
| 9 | Shamna Kasim, Kailash | 4 April 2019 | Madhura Raja |
| 10 | Appani Sarath, Anna Rajan | 5 April 2019 | Sachin |
| 11 | Saniya Iyappan | 11 April 2019 | Lucifer |
| 11 | Anson Paul, Diana Hameed | 11 April 2019 | The Gambler |
| 12 | Salim Kumar, John Kaippallil | 12 April 2019 | Madhura Raja & Oru Yamandan Premakadha |
| 13 | Anusree, John Kaippallil | 15 April 2019 | Madhura Raja |
| 14 | Shine Tom Chacko, Binu Adimali | 18 April 2019 | Mask |
| 15 | Arun Kurian, Vipin George, Binu Thrikkakkara | 19 April 2019 | Oru Yamandan Premakadha |
| 16 | Nikhila Vimal | 25 April 2019 | Mera Naam Shaji |
| 16 | Resul Pookutty | 25 April 2019 | Oru Kadhai Sollatuma |
| 17 | Shane Nigam, Ann Sheetal | 26 April 2019 | Ishq |
| 18 | Govind Padmasoorya | 2 May 2019 | Kee |
| 19 | Lena | 3 May 2019 | Athiran |
| 19 | Sithara Krishnakumar, Anarkali Marikar | 3 May 2019 | Uyare |
| 20 | Deepak Parambol, Anaswara, James Devassy | 9 May 2019 | Ormayil Oru Shishiram |
| 21 | Mamukkoya | 10 May 2019 | No featured promotion |
| 22 | Manju Sunichen, Durga Krishna | 16 May 2019 | Kuttimamaa |
| 23 | Dharmajan Bolgatty, Shanavas Shanu | 17 May 2019 | No featured promotion |
| 24 | Bheeman Raghu | 23 May 2019 | No featured promotion |
| 25 | Manju Pillai, Jayakumar | 24 May 2019 | No featured promotion |
| 26 | Kalabhavan Navas | 30 May 2019 | No featured promotion |
| 27 | Sheethal Shyam, Renju Renjimar, Surya Ishaan | 31 May 2019 | Dhwayah, Transgender beauty pageant |
| 28 | Vinay Forrt, Divya Prabha, Grace Antony, Navas | 6 June 2019 | Thamaasha |
| 29 | Shafi, Vishnu Unnikrishnan, Dhruvan, Gayathri Suresh, Manasa Radhakrishnan, Sowmya Menon, Arun Raj | 7 June 2019 | Children's Park |
| 30 | Jayaraj Warrier | 13 June 2019 | No featured promotion |
| 31 | Surabhi Santosh, Asha Aravind | 14 June 2019 | My Great Grandfather |
| 32 | Arjun Ashokan, Shine Tom Chacko, Noushad, Abhiram | 20 June 2019 | Unda |
| 33 | Navya Nair | 21 June 2019 | No featured promotion |
| 34 | Maqbool Salmaan, Sri Vidya | 27 June 2019 | Mafi Dona |
| 35 | Sarayu, Saji S Palamel, Minon, Mareena Michael Kurisingal | 28 June 2019 | Naan Petta Makan |
