= Neenade Naa =

- Directed by: Kandhas
- Written by: Kandhas
- Produced by: Chandrakala Devaraj
- Starring: Prajwal Devaraj; Priyanka Kandwal; Ankitha; Avinash
- Cinematography: Srinivas
- Music by: Arjun Janya
- Production company: Dynamic Visions
- Release date: 17 October 2014
- Running time: 130 minutes
- Country: India
- Language: Kannada

Neenade Naa (English: For Yourself, Right?) is a 2014 Indian Kannada romantic comedy film directed and written by "Kadhal" Kandhas who earlier worked as a choreographer for South Indian films. The film stars Prajwal Devaraj, Priyanka Kandwal and Ankitha in the lead roles. The film marks the first productional venture of Devaraj's home production, "Dynamic Visions". The film released on 17 October 2014 and positive response from critics

== Plot ==
Dev is an assistant director who has a best friend called Pavithra alias Pavi. Lachchu meets Dev and falls in love with him, where she learns that Dev and Pavi were already married due to family pressure and were divorced long ago. Pavi misunderstands that Dev is in love with her and begins to despise him, but later realizes her mistake and apologize to Dev. Pavi leaves for Canada for her job, where she thanks Dev for his support. Later, Dev moves on with Lacchu.

== Cast ==
- Prajwal Devaraj as Dev
- Priyanka Kandwal as Pavi, Dev's ex-wife
- Ankitha as Lachchu, Dev's love interest
- Doddanna
- Avinash as Pavi's father
- Pavitra Lokesh as Pavi's mother
- Bullet Prakash as Nani
- Pannaga Bharana

== Production ==
The film is based on the director's own life story. The title of the film is inspired by a popular song in the Prajwal's earlier starrer Murali Meets Meera. The film features Prajwal's character in four different looks from a school going boy to a grown-up youth and he had to shed around 14 kilos weight for portraying the role.

== Soundtrack ==
Neenade Naa

Soundtrack album by Arjun Janya
- Released: October 2014
- Genre: Feature film soundtrack

Arjun Janya has composed a total of 5 songs written by various lyricists.

No.	Title	Lyrics	Singer(s)	Length
1.	"Byandu Baaja"	Shivananje Gowda & Chandan	Shankar Mahadevan	Choreograbhy = harsha
2.	"Sumke Sumke"	V. Nagendra Prasad	Arjun Janya, Shilpa	Choreograbhy = kandhas(Director)
3.	"Maribyadave"	K. Kalyan	Karthik	Choreograbhy = kandhas(Director)
4.	"Bitt Budu"	Yogaraj Bhat	Vijay Prakash	Choreograbhy = Thribuvan
5.	"Joru Joru"	K. Kalyan	Rajesh Krishnan, Archana Ravi	Choreograbhy = Sivasankar
