= Campus Diary =

- Theatrical release poster
- Directed by: Jeevan Das
- Written by: Vinish Palayad
- Produced by: Jenish Patel; Sajay Aalakandy
- Starring: V. S. Achuthanandan; Sudev Nair; Gauthami Nair; RJ Mathukutty; Suraj Venjaramoodu
- Cinematography: Premanand
- Music by: Bijibal
- Production company: Drishya Arts Club
- Release date: October 2016
- Country: India
- Language: Malayalam

Campus Diary is a Malayalam political drama film directed by debutante Jeevan Das. The script is written by Vinish Palayad.

V. S. Achuthanandan is debuting as an actor through this film, which also stars Sudev Nair, Gauthami Nair, RJ Mathukutty, Suraj Venjaramoodu.

== Cast ==
- V. S. Achuthanandan as himself
- Sudev Nair as Nikhil
- Gauthami Nair as Krishnapriya
- RJ Mathukutty
- Suraj Venjaramoodu
- Anu Sithara as Kaashi Thumba
- Joy Mathew
- Sunil Sukhada
- Renji Panicker as Koya Saahib
- Kottayam Nazeer
- Mamukkoya
- S. P. Sreekumar
- Thalaivasal Vijay
- Lakshmi Priya
- Sreevidya Mullachery

== Music ==
The music and background score for the film is composed by Bijibal, the lyrics is written by Rafeeq Ahammed.
