= Adrishya Jalakangal =

- Theatrical release poster
- Directed by: Dr. Biju
- Written by: Dr. Biju
- Produced by: Naveen Yerneni; Yalamanchili Ravi Shankar; Tovino Thomas; Radhika Lavu
- Starring: Tovino Thomas; Nimisha Sajayan; Indrans
- Cinematography: Yedhu Radhakrishnan
- Edited by: Davis Manuel
- Music by: Ricky Kej
- Production companies: Mythri Movie Makers; Tovino Thomas Productions; Ellanar Films
- Distributed by: Rd Illuminations LLP
- Release date: 24 November 2023
- Country: India
- Language: Malayalam

Adrishya Jalakangal (transl. Invisible Windows) is a 2023 Indian Malayalam-language anti war film written and directed by Dr. Biju featuring Tovino Thomas, Nimisha Sajayan and Indrans in prominent roles. The film is produced by Radhika Lau's Ellanar Films, Naveen Yerneni, Y Ravi Shankar's Mythri Movie Makers and Tovino Thomas' Tovino Thomas Productions. The film's music is composed by Ricky Kej. Davis Manuel is the editor and the cinematography is handled by Yedhu Radhakrishnan.

The film premiered at the 27th Tallinn Black Nights International Film Festival (TBNIFF) in Estonia in November 2023, becoming the first Malayalam film in the official selection and the only Indian film this year to be selected.

The film was theatrically released on 24 November 2023 and was a flop at the box office.

== Cast ==
- Tovino Thomas
- Nimisha Sajayan
- Indrans
- Bijibal
- Vettukili Prakash
- Balaji Sharma
- Kannan Nair
- Gibin Gopinath
- Krishnan Balakrishnan

== Production ==
=== Development ===
The film was announced by Dr. Biju in July 2022. According to Dr. Biju, the film is a surrealist film that captures the war and the story is not focused on a particular place or language but is equally important all over the world. He said "I have opted for a different treatment for the film, especially the choice of music, which has more of an esoteric, universal flavour."

Radhika Lavu has led the production of the film after producing two successful Telugu web series under the Ellanar Films banner. The film also marks the maiden production of Mythri Movie Makers in Malayalam cinema. Indian American composer Ricky Kej was signed to compose the music marking his first Malayalam film.

=== Casting ===
Tovino Thomas and Nimisha Sajayan are reuniting after the 2018 release of Oru Kuprasidha Payyan. Tovino Thomas is playing a role with no name. To prepare for his role, he reduced his body weight by 15 kg.

=== Filming ===
Filming commenced in August 2022. Touted to be the biggest film helmed by Dr. Biju, which was expected to have a lengthy schedule, shooting began in August 2022 in Kasaragod. Kannur is the next main location where the makers have erected sets, which took them two months to complete. Tovino joined the set after wrapping up his portions for 2018 and Neelavelicham.

== Release ==
=== Theatrical ===
Following the film's premiere at the Tallinn Black Nights International Film Festival (TBNIFF), it was theatrically released on 24 November 2023.

=== Home media ===
Netflix has acquired its digital streaming rights.

== Reception ==
=== Critical response ===
Princy Alexander of Onmanorama wrote, "Adrishya Jalakangal is unequivocally an art-house film. Much like its title suggests, it revolves around individuals who are invisible yet cast shadows on the real world, praising the performance of Nimisha Sajayan and Tovino Thomas." Times Now gave a rating of 3 out of 5 stars and wrote, "A concoction of so many themes may leave some viewers scratching their heads. The anti-war message, despite being much-needed, seems preachy and fails to strike a chord. Despite combining multiple elements, the story of the film flows smoothly, courtesy of Dr Biju's vision and the effortless performances of the cast."

Anandu Suresh of The Indian Express gave 4 out of 5 stars and wrote, "Adrishya Jalakangal can surely be dubbed as a movie that we did not know we needed." Shilpa Nair Anand of The Hindu wrote, "The cinematography by Yedhu Radhakrishnan reinforces the bleakness we feel, and the camera captures the loneliness of their lives; the music by Grammy-winner Ricky Kej is on point with the mood of the film. This film is political and is not an easy watch. It moves at a leisurely pace, seemingly meandering at times, but held together cohesively. Watching it is like reading a difficult book."
