= Mask (2019 film) =

2019 Indian Malayalam-language comedy film

MASK: Muhammedum Albyum Shathrukkalaaya Katha
- Theatrical release poster
- Directed by: Sunil Hanif
- Written by: Fazal; Sunil Hanif
- Produced by: A. S. Gireesh Lal
- Starring: Shine Tom Chacko; Chemban Vinod Jose; Vijayaraghavan; Priyanka Nair
- Cinematography: Prakash Velayudhan
- Music by: Gopi Sundar
- Production company: Gowri Meenakshi Movies
- Release date: 5 June 2019 (Kerala)
- Country: India
- Language: Malayalam

MASK (acronym of Muhammedum Albyum Shathrukkalaaya Katha) is a 2019 Indian Malayalam-language comedy film co-written and directed by Sunif Hanif. The film, produced by A. S. Gireesh Lal for Gowri Meenakshi Movies, stars Shine Tom Chacko, Chemban Vinod Jose, Vijayaraghavan and Priyanka Nair in the lead roles. Gopi Sundar composed the soundtrack and score, while Prakash Velayudhan handled the cinematography. The film, which tells the story of a police inspector who sets out to track down a thief, released on 5 June 2019. The film was a spiritual successor of the 2014 film Ithihasa starring Shine Tom Chacko and Anusree.

== Cast ==
- Shine Tom Chacko as Alby John, thief
- Chemban Vinod Jose as S.I. Haneef Muhammed, a police officer
- Priyanka Nair as Rasiya Begam, Haneef's wife
- Vijayaraghavan as Ramji Rao
- Salim Kumar as Cheguevara alias Jaggu Varapuzha
- Roshna Ann Roy as Kunjumol
- Sasi Kalinga
- Abu Salim as Subair
- Ameer Niyas as Doctor
- Niyas Bakker
- Nirmal Palazhi as Abdu
- Manoj Guinness as Patru
- Chembil Asokan as Achayan
- Chali Pala
- Ponnamma babu as ammachi
- Pashanam Shaji as police constable
- Mammukoya as Valiyauppa
- Shaiju as Najim elder brother of rasiya
- Prasanth Alexander as elder brother of rasiya
- Krishna Praba as Najeeb's wife
- Saumya Bhagyan Pillai as Civil Police Officer
- Juhi Rustagi
- Kottayam Pradeep
- Jayakrishnan
