= Bhoomiyile Manohara Swakaryam =

2020 Malayalam language film

- Directed by: Shyju Anthikad
- Screenplay by: A. Santha Kumar
- Produced by: Rajeev Kumar
- Starring: Prayaga Martin; Deepak Parambol; Indrans; Shine Tom Chacko; Mani Adat; Sudheesh
- Cinematography: Antonio Michael
- Edited by: V. Sajan
- Music by: Sachin Balu
- Production company: Bioscope Talkies
- Release date: 28 February 2020
- Country: India
- Language: Malayalam

Bhoomiyile Manohara Swakaryam is a 2020 Malayalam language romantic drama film directed by Shyju Anthikkad and starring Prayaga Martin and Deepak Parambol in lead roles. The supporting cast includes Indrans, Sudheesh, Shine Tom Chacko and Mani Adat.

== Plot ==
The movie starts with the elopement of Anna Joseph (Prayaga Martin) and Ahmed Kutty a.k.a. Ammatty (Deepak Parambol) that sets off communal tensions between Christians and Muslims in a small village in Kerala. Men from both religions roam the village at night searching for the eloped couple, and when the situation becomes volatile, the local police get involved. Alex John (Shine Tom Chacko) is the local police inspector, who reads through the diary of Anna Joseph.

Through flashback, the inspector reads Ammatty's and Anna's story. Their families were good friends even when Ammatty and Anna were babies, and the two grow up together as best friends, and later, as lovers. They go to the same school and college, with their best friend Jaffer their one true confidant. However, Ammatty leaves town one night, with no more explanation than a voice message to his best friend Jaffer, and through him to Anna asking both of them to not look for him or wait for him. He promises them he is going away for good, but with noble intentions. Anna is heartbroken and decides to become a nun instead of her younger sister Ancy who was initially meant to be ordained as part of a family offering to God.

The diary ends here, and the inspector starts questioning all those who saw the couple that night. From one of them, he realizes that they were forced to flee when spotted and surrounded by a crowd while talking.

The story flashes back to earlier in that day: Anna is already a nun when Ammatty comes back to their village as an Islamic scholar and speaker. Many years have passed since their last meeting. As he is speaking in an open ground right next to Anna's convent, he spots her at the back of the crowd half hidden by the trees. When they meet after everyone else has left, Anna asks Ammatty to explain why he left her suddenly all those years ago. He says that her father asked him to convince Anna to be a nun instead of her sister, because Ancy was in love with the crippled boy next door. Anna's father did not want to go back on his offering to God, and thought Ammatty had the best chance of persuading Anna, thinking the two be no more than good friends to each other. Just as they were about to go their separate ways, they are spotted by a group of men and are forced to flee the ground. They take refuge in an old, abandoned house.

The inspector tracks them down to that house with Jaffer's help, but realizing that Anna and Ammatty have done nothing wrong, help them escape. The two leave the village and reach Kanyakumari, where they start to build their life together. After a few blissful days together, they are surprised one morning to find both their fathers on their doorstep. Both fathers appear to be loving and accepting of their relationship, and said the police inspector took a role in calming both communities down back in the village. Privately, both fathers tell their respective son and daughter that they have to convert their spouses to Islam and Christianity. After the fathers leave, slowly, religious differences start to create problems for Ammatty and Anna. They each want the other to convert, and when that doesn't happen, Anna and Ammatty decide to go break up their relationship and go back home. They are almost home, and on a boat that will take them across the river to their village, Anna says she is pregnant. Ammatty and Anna choose love and decide to stay together.

== Cast ==
- Prayaga Martin as Anna Joseph
- Deepak Parambol as Ahmad Kutty a.k.a. Ammatty
  - Gourav Menon as Young Ammatty
- Yami Sona as Ancy Joseph, Anna's Sister
- Shine Tom Chacko as Circle Inspector Alex John
- Indrans as Abdu, Ammatty's father
- Anju Aravind as Sainu, Ammatty's Mother
- Sudheesh as Joseph, Anna's father
- Abhishek Raveendran as Jaffer
- Nisha Sarang as Mariam, Anna's mother
- Santhosh Keezhattoor as Fr. Dominic
- Lal as Chacko
- Balan Parakkal as Ramu
- Hareesh Peradi as Driver Hari
- Appunni Sasi as Basheer
- Manju Satheesh as Priya

== Accolades ==
Award	Category	Recipient(s)	Result	Ref.
Kerala State Film Awards	Kerala State Film Award for Best Dubbing Artist	Shobi Thilakan	Won	
Kerala State Film Awards	Kerala State Film Award for Best Character Actor	Sudheesh	Won	
