= Shine Tom Chacko =

Indian actor

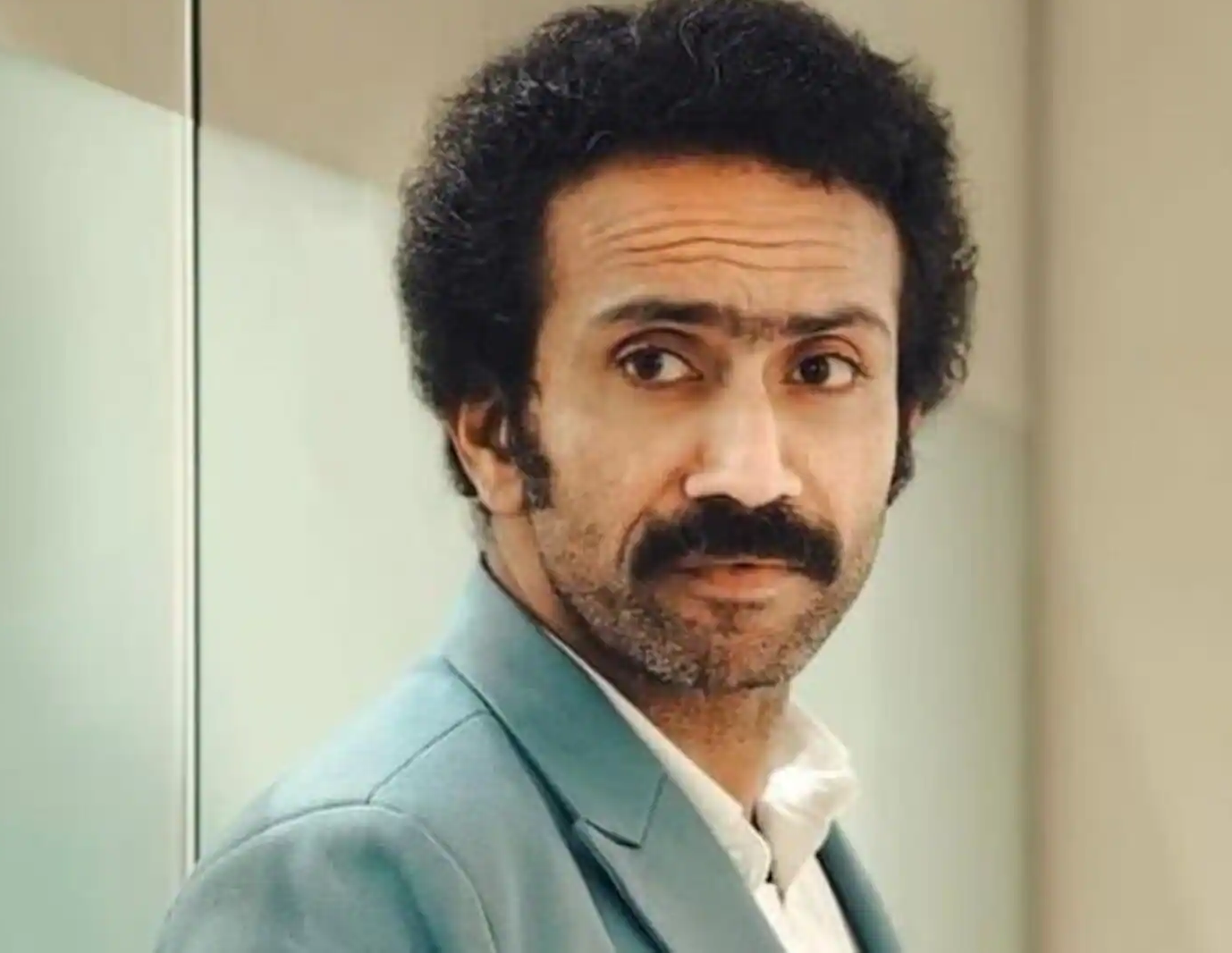
- Born: 15 September 1983 (age 43); Thrissur, Kerala, India
- Education: St. Thomas College, Thrissur
- Occupations: Actor; assistant director
- Years active: 2002–present
- Height: 168 cm (5 ft 6 in)
- Spouse: Thabeetha
- Children: 1

Shine Tom Chacko (born 15 September 1983) is an Indian actor who works in Malayalam cinema along with a few Telugu and Tamil films. After working as an assistant director to director Kamal for about 9 years, he forayed into acting through the film, Gaddama. He played supporting roles in several films including Ee Adutha Kaalathu, Chapters, Annayum Rasoolum, Masala Republic, and Jigarthanda DoubleX and played his first lead role in Binu S Kalady's fantasy-comedy film Ithihasa (2014) which dealt with body-swapping.

== Early life ==
Shine Tom Chacko was born on 15 September 1983 in Thrissur, Kerala, to C.P. Chacko and Maria Carmel. He completed a B.Com degree from St. Thomas College, Thrissur.

== Career ==
Shine started his career as an assistant director to Kamal in the early 2000s. He worked for nearly 10 years with Kamal and, during this time, appeared as a man sitting in a bus in the 2002 film Nammal directed by Kamal. Shine made his acting debut in 2011 with Kamal's Gaddama. He portrayed the role of an immigrant, who is tortured and treated like a slave in a desert in Saudi Arabia. He played a notable role in Sunil Ibrahim's Chapters (2012). The film was a box-office failure. After playing some usual sidekick and other minor roles in movies such as Annayum Rasoolum (2013) and Ee Adutha Kaalathu (2012), Shine got his breakthrough with the 2014 fantasy comedy Ithihasa directed by Binu Sadanandan. Shine played the lead role in the film which deals with body swapping and it turned out to be one of the highest grossing Malayalam movies in 2014. He was praised for his strong negative shade role in Kammatipaadam (2016). The same year he played a notable role in Annmariya Kalippilaanu. Shine played the lead roles as Antony in Dum and Kinder in Popcorn, both released in 2016. Both movies were unsuccessful at the box office.

In 2017, Shine played some notable roles in movies such as Godha, Tiyaan, Varnyathil Aashanka, Parava and Mayanadhi. Shine played the lead role in Who (2018) which is the first Malayalam movie dealing with time travel. Same year, he played a lead role in Ottakkoru Kamukan, which received mixed reviews from critics.

Shine's villainous performance in Ishq (2019) was critically acclaimed despite the movie receiving negative reviews from most critics. He portrayed Alwin, a moral police who intervenes in the privacy of a couple. The Hindu described Alwin as one of the most despicable villainous roles in Malayalam cinema of the decade. He played a lead role in the fantasy comedy Mask, which also deals with body swapping. Shine's performance in Khalid Rahman's black comedy Unda (2019) was appraised. Some critics listed Unda as one of the best Malayalam movies of the decade.

In 2020, Shine had notable roles in Bhoomiyile Manohara Swakaryam and Maniyarayile Ashokan. The same year he played the lead role in Khalid Rahman's thriller Love, which received mixed reviews. The movie had a late release in India on 29 January 2021. In 2021, he played a police officer in Operation Java and Wolf. Both movies were critically acclaimed. He also had a notable role in Anugraheethan Antony. Shine has also a notable role in the latest OTT release Kuruthi starring Prithviraj Sukumaran, Roshan Mathew and more. He further received critical acclaim and likes of the audience for his performance in Kurup (2021)

In 2022, he appeared in the critically acclaimed Veyil, Bheeshma Parvam and Pada.

Shine made his Tamil debut in 2022 with Beast, an action drama starring Vijay and Pooja Hegde in the lead roles. The film was commercially successful, grossing over ₹300 crore at box office.

Shine made his Telugu debut in 2023 with Dasara, an action drama starring Nani and Keerthy Suresh in the lead roles.

== Controversies ==
On 31 January 2015, Shine Tom Chacko and four women were arrested in Kochi for allegedly possessing narcotics. A case under the Narcotic Drugs and Psychotropic Substance Act was registered against him. He was later granted bail by the High Court of Kerala.

On 11 February 2025, he was acquitted by the court from all the charges.

On April 17 2025, he was accused by Vincy Aloshious of misbehaviour under the influence of drugs on their film set. Facing allegations of drug use on film sets, he reportedly fled the scene during a narcotics raid at a Kochi hotel by jumping from the building's third floor window.

== Filmography ==
Key
| † | Denotes films that have not yet been released |

=== Malayalam films ===
List of Shine Tom Chacko Malayalam language film credits
| Year | Title | Role | Notes |
|---|---|---|---|
| 2002 | Nammal | Bus passenger | Uncredited |
| 2011 | Gaddama | Basheer | |
| 2011 | Salt N' Pepper | Dubbing director | |
| 2012 | Ee Adutha Kaalathu | Serial killer | |
| 2012 | Chapters | Vinod / Choonda | |
| 2012 | Da Thadiya | Streetside salesman | |
| 2013 | Annayum Rasoolum | Abu | |
| 2013 | 5 Sundarikal | Servant | Segment: Gauri |
| 2013 | Arikil Oraal | Alfred | |
| 2013 | Kaanchi | Vijayan | |
| 2014 | Pakida | Sunny | |
| 2014 | Hang Over | Noor | |
| 2014 | Konthayum Poonoolum | Martin | |
| 2014 | Masala Republic | Sivan Kutty | |
| 2014 | Ithihasa | Alvy Benedict / Janaki | |
| 2015 | Viswasam Athalle Ellam | Jomon | |
| 2015 | Ottaal | Boss | |
| 2015 | Saigal Paadukayaanu | Chandra Babu | |
| 2016 | Style | Crazy man at the church | Cameo appearance |
| 2016 | Kammatipaadam | Johny | |
| 2016 | Mohavalayam | | |
| 2016 | Ann Maria Kalippilaanu | Suku | |
| 2016 | Dooram | Sam | |
| 2016 | Dum | Anthony | |
| 2016 | Popcorn | Kinder | |
| 2016 | Koppayile Kodumkaatu | Appu | |
| 2017 | Godha | Kidilam Feroz | |
| 2017 | Prethamundu Sookshikuka | 'Ethics' Babu | |
| 2017 | Tiyaan | Jameel | |
| 2017 | Varnyathil Aashanka | Pratheesh | |
| 2017 | Mannankattayum Kariyilayum | Kishore | |
| 2017 | Avarude Raavukal | Shine | |
| 2017 | Parava | Rauf | |
| 2017 | Mayanadhi | Shine John | Cameo appearance |
| 2018 | Sakhavinte Priyasakhi | | |
| 2018 | Kayamkulam Kochunni | Kochu Pillai | |
| 2018 | Who | John | |
| 2018 | Ottakoru Kaamukan | Vincent | |
| 2019 | Oru Kaatil Oru Paaykappal | Ajith Menon | |
| 2019 | Ishq | Alwin | |
| 2019 | Mask | Alby John | |
| 2019 | Unda | Jojo Samson | |
| 2019 | My Santa | Police officer | Cameo appearance |
| 2019 | Kettyolaanu Ente Malakha | Shine | |
| 2020 | Bhoomiyile Manohara Swakaryam | Alex John | |
| 2020 | Maniyarayile Ashokan | Shaiju | |
| 2020 | Love | Anoop | |
| 2021 | Operation Java | CI Jacob Mani | |
| 2021 | Anugraheethan Antony | Sanjay Madhav | |
| 2021 | Wolf | SI Jayan | 50th film |
| 2021 | Kuruthi | Kareem | |
| 2021 | Bhramam | Stag Hunter | Cameo appearance |
| 2021 | Kurup | Bhasi Pillai | |
| 2022 | Veyil | Jomy Mathew | |
| 2022 | Bheeshma Parvam | Anjootti Peter | |
| 2022 | Pada | Sadik Hasanar | |
| 2022 | Panthrandu | Pathro | |
| 2022 | Kochaal | Pinker Babu | |
| 2022 | Adithattu | Ambross | |
| 2022 | Thallumaala | S.I. Reji | |
| 2022 | Kudukku | Evan | |
| 2022 | Kumari | Kaanhirangat Dhruvan Thampuran | |
| 2022 | Padavettu | Mohanan | |
| 2022 | Roy | CI Ajit Easwar | |
| 2022 | Vichithram | Jackson | |
| 2022 | Bharatha Circus | Anoop | |
| 2023 | Djinn | Sudheep | |
| 2023 | Christopher | DYSP George Kottrakkan | |
| 2023 | Boomerang | Roney | |
| 2023 | Corona Papers | Kaakka Paappi | |
| 2023 | Adi | Sajeev Nair | |
| 2023 | Neelavelicham | Nanukkuttan | |
| 2023 | Madhura Manohara Moham | Vishnu | Cameo appearance |
| 2023 | Live | Sam John Vakathanam | |
| 2023 | Kurukkan | Hari | |
| 2023 | Maharani | Ajeesh | |
| 2023 | Dance Party | | |
| 2023 | Kannur Squad | CPO Subhash | Cameo appearance |
| 2024 | Vivekanandan Viralanu | Vivekanandan | |
| 2024 | Iyer In Arabia | Freddy | |
| 2024 | Thundu | Shibin | |
| 2024 | Thankamani | | |
| 2024 | Malayalee From India | Dr. Sajin Babu | |
| 2024 | Nadikar | Himself | Cameo appearance |
| 2024 | Once Upon a Time in Kochi | Ram Kumar | |
| 2024 | Little Hearts | Sharon | |
| 2024 | Adios Amigo | Sojan | |
| 2024 | Thaanara | Adarsh Sreevaraham | |
| 2024 | Oru Anweshanathinte Thudakkam | Jeevan Thomas | |
| 2025 | Dominic and the Ladies' Purse | Alby | |
| 2025 | Chattuli | | |
| 2025 | Abhilasham | | |
| 2025 | Bazooka | Franco Salvastone | |
| 2025 | Alappuzha Gymkhana | City Police Commissioner | |
| 2025 | The Protector | | |
| 2025 | Soothravakyam | Chief Inspector Christo Xavier | |
| 2025 | Meesha | Kitho | |
| 2025 | Diés Iraé | Manu/Philip Sebastian | |
| 2025 | Adinaasam Vellapokkam | Columbus | |
| 2026 | Velleppam | Sakhavu | |
| 2026 | Shukran | | |
| 2026 | Derby | Avinash | |
| 2026 | Ankam Attahasam | | |
| 2026 | Dhoomakethu | | |
| 2026 | Bachelor Party D'eux | Guru | |
| TBA | Aaraam Thirukalpana † | TBA | Post-production |
| TBA | Paradise Circus † | Victor | Post-production |

=== Other language films ===
List of Shine Tom Chacko other language film credits
| Year | Title | Role | Language | Notes |
|---|---|---|---|---|
| 2022 | Beast | Malik | Tamil | |
| 2023 | Jigarthanda DoubleX | Jeyakodi | Tamil | |
| 2023 | Dasara | Chinna Nambi | Telugu | |
| 2023 | Rangabali | MLA Parasuram | Telugu | |
| 2024 | Devara: Part 1 | Kora | Telugu | |
| 2025 | Daaku Maharaaj | Inspector Stephen Raj | Telugu | |
| 2025 | Robinhood | Victor Varghese | Telugu | |
| 2025 | Good Bad Ugly | Shanmuga "Simon" | Tamil | |
| 2025 | Mark | Adikeshava | Kannada | |

== Awards and nominations ==
| Award | Year | Category | Film | Result | Ref. |
|---|---|---|---|---|---|
| SIIMA Awards | 2019 | Best Actor in a Negative Role (Malayalam) | Ishq | Won | |
| 3rd IIFA Utsavam | 2023 | Performance in a Negative Role (Telugu) | Dasara | Won | |
