= Chakkappazham =

Indian-Malayalam language sitcom

- Genre: Sitcom; Comedy
- Written by: Shameer Khan; Greenson Pious; Abhilash Chandran; Jintil Antony
- Directed by: R. Unnikrishnan; Vinod A. S
- Country of origin: India
- Original language: Malayalam
- No. of seasons: 2
- No. of episodes: 884

Production
- Producer: Flowers TV Production
- Editor: Sateesh Kumar B
- Camera setup: Multi-camera
- Running time: 18 – 22 minutes

Original release
- Network: Flowers TV
- Release: 10 August 2020 – 10 May 2024

Chakkappazham is a Malayalam language sitcom directed by Vinod A. S. that aired on Flowers TV from 10 August 2020 to 10 May 2024. The show stars S. P. Sreekumar, Aswathy Sreekanth, Mohammad Rafi, Amal Rajdev, Tessa Joseph, Shruthi Rajanikanth and Arjun Somashekaran in the lead roles.

The first season of the show aired from 10 August 2020 and ended on 21 June 2022 consisting of 440 episodes. The second season of the show aired from 29 August 2022 to 10 May 2024 consisting of 444 episodes .

== Series overview ==
Series	Episodes	Originally released	
Series	Episodes	First released	Last released
1	440	10 August 2020	21 June 2022
2	444	29 August 2022	10 May 2024

== Plot summary ==
Season 1 can be divided into 3 parts - Searching on youtube as ( Chakkapazham Season 1 Part 1 Will not be available. )

=== Season 1 (Part 1) ===
The family life of Uthaman and his wife Asha faces a series of misunderstandings and chaos. There is confusion, humor, healthy discussions and a lot of love. The main draw of the story is the interesting fights and situational comedy between family members.

=== Season 1 (Part 2) ===
The story revolves around Sumesh (Muhammad Rafi) and Supriya (Haritha Haridas), who are newlyweds.

=== Season 1 (Part 3) ===
The story revolves around Sumesh's uncle Shankunni and his family and their neighbour Prabhu and his family.

=== Season 2 ===
The interesting happenings that happen every day in the family of a free going young man Sumesh and his elder brother Uthaman, who is a veterinary hospital compounder.

== Cast ==
=== Main Cast (Season 1;Part 1 & Season 2) ===
- S. P. Sreekumar as Uthaman P. K
- Aswathy Sreekanth as Asha Uthaman
- Mohammad Rafi as Sumesh P. K
- Amal Rajdev as Plavilaveetil Kunjunni
- Tessa Joseph as Lalitha Kunjunni
- Shruthi Rajanikanth as Painkilli P. K / Pinky
- Arjun Somashekaran as P. C Shivan
- Lakshmi Unnikrishnan as Pallavi Uthaman
- Aryan Kashi as Shambu Uthaman
- Sadhika Suresh Menon as Aamy Uthaman
- Raihu Shameer as Kannan Shivan
- Indira Devi as Achamma / Meenakshiyamma

=== Recurring (Season 2) ===
- Sona Nair as Kupinivillasam Pashmaja; Sivan's mother, Painkilis mother-in-law
- Sunil Sukhada as Mrigapalan Doctor, Uthaman's senior doctor
- Unknown as Kanthi, Sumesh's wellwisher
- Ananthan as Hrishikesh; Asha's father
- Shonima as Shonima, Subhadra Kunjamma’s daughter, Kunjunni’s cousin
- Ajeesh as Ajeesh, Shonima’s husband
- Sheethal Elzha as Shobana aka Shilpa, the prankster hired by Painkili
- Dr.Neethu Krishna as Kalyani, Painkili’s home nurse
- Mithun M. Das as Raghu Kumar, Asha’s stalker

=== Main (Season 1; Part 2) ===
- Muhammad Rafi as Sumesh Kunjunni
- Manu Joseph as Shibu
- Haritha Haridas as Supriya Sumesh
- Shruthi Rajinikanth as Painkilli
- Vishnu IP as Shivan
- Amal Rajdev as Plavilla Veetil Kunjunni
- Sabitta George as Lalitha Kunjunni
- Lakshmi Unnikrishnan as Pallavi
- Aaryan Kashi as Shambu
- Sadhika Suresh Menon as Aami
- Indira Devi as Achamma

=== Recurring (Season 1; Part 1 & 2) ===
- Kalabhavan Rahman as Marthandan Kunju
- Ananthan as Hrishikesh
- Shanmughan Das as Vijayan Shankunni
- Reshmi Anil as Kasthuri
- Shaju Mavelikara as Chori Babu
- Kavitha as Kanyaka
- Soundarya Suresh as Lilly

=== Main (Season 1; Part 3) ===
- Muhammad Rafi as Sumesh Kunjunni
- Haritha Haridas as Supriya Sumesh
- Pradeep Menon as Dasan Shankunni
- Asha Aravind as Prathiba Dasan
- Abhilash Kottarakkara as Prabhu Pankajakshan
- Rohini Rahul as Manjusha Prabhu
- Sanoop Kumar as Killadi Raju
- Jerry Francis as Manikandan
- Aaryan Kaashi as Shambu Uthaman
- Ardhra Sajan as Madhu Prabhu
- Muhammad Faizal as Chikku Dasan
- Dhaya Bipin as Lakshmana Dasan
- Gopika Babu as Kallu Prabhu
- Tanmay Madhav as Bose Prabhu
- Lechu Lakshmi as Kunji Dasan
- Sruthy Suresh as Thara

=== Former (Season 1) ===
- S. P. Sreekumar as Uthaman Kunjunni (Ep 1- Ep 263)
- Aswathy Sreekanth as Asha Kunjunni (Ep 1-Ep 218)
- Arjun Somashekaran as PC Shivan (Ep 1- Ep 93)
- K. P. A. C. Lalitha as Kamala Kunjamma(Ep 101-Ep 110)

=== Former (Season 2) ===
- Sabitta George as Lalitha Kunjunni (Ep 1- Ep 58)

== Reboot & Season 2 ==
The show's first season, which portrayed the life of Sumesh and his family ended on 16 May 2022. On the very next day, The show started portraying the life of Sumesh's uncle Shankunni and his family, which started with the same title. But due to low trp and negative reviews this part of the season was concluded on 22 June 2022.

However, The story of Sumesh and his family returned to limelight on 29 August 2022 as the second season of Chakkappazham.

== Reception ==
The Show is one of the most popular television Sitcoms in Malayalam Television. It is widely praised for the chemistry among actors and for timely comedies.

Muhammad Rafi, who plays a major role in this sitcom became popular due to his witty comic timing and method acting after the show started airing. He is also regarded as the most fan-based actor in Chakkappazham.

== Awards ==
Award	Year	Category	Recipient	Note
Kerala State Television Award	2020	Best Actress	Aswathy Sreekanth	
Kerala State Television Award	2020	Second Best Actor	Muhammad Rafi	
