= Shruthi Rajanikanth =

Indian actress

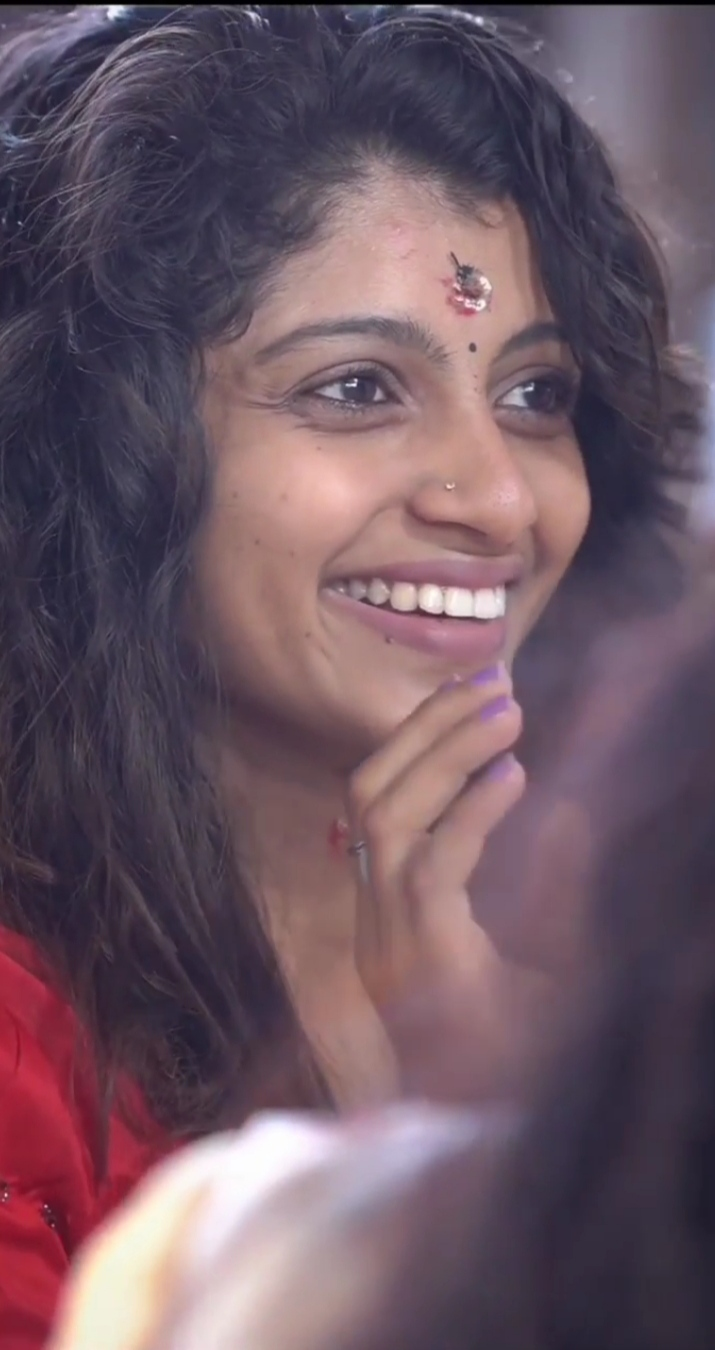
- Born: 7 November 1995 (age 31); Ambalapuzha, Kerala
- Education: Pazhassi Raja College
- Notable work: Chakkappazham
- Parent(s): Rajanikanth (Father), Lekha Rajanikanth (Mother)

Shruthi Rajanikanth is an Indian actress, model, and RJ from Ambalapuzha who rose to fame through the Malayalam TV series Chakkappazham aired on Flowers TV. She started her acting career as a child artist in the Malayalam TV series Unnikuttan.

== Early life ==
Shruthi is the daughter of Rajanikanth J. who is a business man and Lekha Rajanikanth, a makeup artist from Alappuzha. She also has an younger brother, Sangeeth R.

== Education ==
After her schooling at Chinmaya Vidyalaya, Alappuzha, she did BA in Mass Communication and Journalism at Pazhassiraja College, Pulpally, Wayanad and MA in Mass Communication and Journalism at Bharathiar University, Coimbatore.

== Filmography ==
=== Television ===
List of television credits
Year	Show	Role	Channel	Notes	Ref.
2001	Unnikuttan	Unnikutta		Child Artist	
2002	Manasaputri		Surya TV	Child Artist	
2004-2005	Ettu Sundarikalum Njanum	Chinnu Mol	Surya TV	Child Artist	
2005	Culcutta Hospital		Surya TV	Child Artist	
2005	Sthree Hrudayam			Child Artist	
2005	Sundari Sundari		Asianet	Child Artist	
2020	Star Magic	Guest	Flowers TV	Herself	
2020-2024	Chakkappazham	Painkily/Pinky Shivan	Flowers TV	Lead role	

=== Films ===
Year	Title	Role	Notes	Ref.
2019	Chilappol Penkutty	Shreya		
2021	Kunjeldho			
2021	Vaigha		Short film	
2022	Padma	Jolly		
2023	Neeraja	Anjali		
2023	Queen Elizabeth	Roshni		

=== Web series ===
List of web series credits
Year	Series	Role	Notes	Ref.
2022–present	OJO Kanmani	Minnu		
