= Adi (film) =

2023 Indian film directed by Prasobh Vijayan

- Theatrical release poster
- Directed by: Prasobh Vijayan
- Written by: Ratheesh Ravi
- Produced by: Dulquer Salmaan; Jom Varghese
- Starring: Shine Tom Chacko; Ahaana Krishna; Dhruvan
- Cinematography: Faiz Siddik
- Edited by: Noufal Abdullah
- Music by: Govind Vasantha
- Production company: Wayfarer Films
- Release date: 14 April 2023
- Running time: 131 minutes
- Country: India
- Language: Malayalam

Adi is a 2023 Indian Malayalam-language comedy-drama film directed by Prasobh Vijayan and written by Ratheesh Ravi. It stars Shine Tom Chacko and Ahaana Krishna.

== Plot ==
Nandu, a non-resident Indian, and his wife Geethi accidentally anger a local goon named Pattar and his friend Kunjava. Despite Nandu's promise to Geethi not to retaliate, he secretly challenges Pattar to a duel to prove himself. However, the plan fails, leading to further conflicts between Nandu and Pattar's gang.

As tensions escalate, Geethi becomes aware of Nandu's actions and confronts him. She decides to seek a compromise with Pattar but discovers the true extent of his demands, leading to further strain in their relationship.

In an attempt to resolve the situation, Geethi suggests a truce meeting with Pattar and Kunjava. However, Nandu's revelation of Pattar's desire to sleep with Geethi leads to a confrontation, ultimately resulting in Pattar's intimidation and departure.

As Nandu prepares to leave for Dubai, he encounters Pattar and Kunjava again. In a final act of defiance, Nandu confronts them, ensuring their departure and assuring his friend Thankachayan of Geethi's ability to handle the situation in his absence.

== Cast ==
- Shine Tom Chacko as Sajeev Nair
- Ahaana Krishna as Geethika Sajeev
- Dhruvan as Joby Varghese
- Anu Joseph as Sajeev's sister
- Bitto Davis as Thankachan
- Omana Ouseph
- Master Aadhidev
- Bindhu Jayan
- Jibin V Joseph
- Sreekanth Dasan

== Soundtrack ==
Songs
No.	Title	Lyrics	Playback	Length
1.	"Thone Mohangal"	Sharafu	Haniya Nafeesa, Govind Vasantha	2:24
2.	"Pandaaradangan"	Anwar Ali	Govind Vasantha	3:32
3.	"Kokkarako"	Anwar Ali	Harisree Ashokan	3:42

== Release ==
The digital rights were acquired by ZEE5 and began streaming it on 22 December 2023.

== Reception ==
The Times of India wrote that "The story, which attempts at feminist credentials, is built up to lead to the climax, a bit like Ratheesh Ravi's earlier screenplay for Ishq: Not A Love Story. But Adi lacks the thrilling pace and layered storytelling of Ishq. Also, while it has an UA rating, it could get quite embarrassing to watch it with children; we need to get a bit more stringent on this front."
