= Kamuki =

2018 Indian film

- Theatrical release poster
- Directed by: Binu Sadanandan
- Screenplay by: Binu Sadanandan
- Produced by: Unmesh Unnikrishnan
- Starring: Askar Ali; Aparna Balamurali; Dain Davis; Baiju Santhosh; Kavya Suresh
- Cinematography: Rowin Basker
- Edited by: Sudhi Maddison
- Music by: Gopi Sundar
- Production company: First Clap Movies
- Release date: 11 May 2018
- Running time: 122 minutes
- Country: India
- Language: Malayalam

Kamuki (transl. Lover) is a 2018 Indian Malayalam-language romantic comedy film written and directed by Binu Sadanandan, based on a true story. It stars Askar Ali, Aparna Balamurali, and Dain Davis, with Baiju Santhosh, Rony David, and Kavya Suresh in supporting roles. The film's score was composed by Gopi Sundar. The film is about a star-crossed romance between a blind young man, Harikrishnan, and a happy-go-lucky girl, Achamma.

== Plot ==
Achamma Varghese alias Achu is the favourite daughter of Varghese Master. He makes her promise not to follow her sister's footsteps in eloping with a boy, he hopes Achu to be a good girl and faithful to the family. Achu and her friend Jeena pursue a master's degree in social work at Sree Shankara College. Achu keeps her promise until she meets Hari who is blind and always hangout with his friend Jaffar in college. Besides being blind, Hari has a clear vision of his future. Achu, on the other hand, prefers having fun instead of studying. One day during Onam celebration in the college, Achu confesses her love for Hari. However, Hari turns her down citing that she is not serious in life. In reality, Hari doesn't want to be a burden on Achu.

In college, the Professor of Social Works gets upset that the students are not serious about the profession and the course. He scolds them and totally ignores Achu that she is the least serious person in the college. This is a wake up call for Achu. She starts to help the needy and starts getting recognised by people and everyone is proud of her. Jafar talks to Hari and makes him realise that he too loves Achu. When Hari is about to confess his love for Achu, she tells him that let's continue as friends (not aware that Hari was about to confess his love).

Hari wins Achu's heart with his positive attitude and determination, unfortunately, her family adamantly opposes this relationship because Hari is blind. In the end, during Holi celebrations at college, the entire college tries to convince Achu's father to allow for Achu and Hari's marriage. Achu's father agrees on one condition of hiding Achu within the college crowd and asking Hari to find Achu without any help. Hari is scared, but he tries to remember his mother's words of encouragement when he was a small kid and had lost his sight. Hari depends on his ability of smell and hearing to find Achu. Finally Achu's father has to agree. The focus is on Hari's mother who stands there and gives Achu's father a confident and determined look.

== Cast ==
- Askar Ali as P. Harikrishnan
- Aparna Balamurali as Achu (Achamma Varghese)
  - Akshara Kishor as Young Achu
- Dain Davis as Jaffar
- Baiju as Varghese Master
- Deepa Kartha as Deepa Pradeep, Hari's mother
- Thushara Pillai as Achamma's mother
- Kavya Suresh as Jeena
- Aneesh Gopal as Snehithan
- Sibi Thomas as Rajesh
- Rony David as James
- Rosin Jolly as Lashmi Rajesh
- Pradeep Kottayam as Principal
- Joemon Joshy as JJ (Janaki Janardhanan)
- Kiran Lal as Britto
- Rahul Nair as Jayasankar
- Binu Adimali as Sreeni
- Dominic Dom as Sharuk khan
- Mathukkutty as Doctor Narayanan Kutty
- Surjith Gopinath

== Music ==
The film music and score were composed by Gopi Sundar.

Track listing
No.	Title	Singer(s)	Length
1.	"Kurumbi"	Sreya Jayadeep, Arya V.S., Mehthab Azeen, Devananda	05:34
2.	"Sowhrudam"	Sithara, Midhun Jeyaraj	04:30
3.	"Neeyam Sooryan"	Divya S. Menon, Ashitha, Mekha, Geethu	03:25

== Reception ==
The film received mixed reviews.
