= Kunjeldho =

- Theatrical release poster
- Directed by: Mathukkutty
- Written by: Mathukkutty
- Produced by: Suvin K Varkey; Prasobh Krishna
- Starring: Asif Ali; Gopika Udayan; Siddique
- Cinematography: Swaroop Philip
- Edited by: Ranjan Abraham
- Music by: Shaan Rahman
- Production company: Little Big Films
- Distributed by: Century Films
- Release date: 24 December 2021 (India)
- Country: India
- Language: Malayalam

Kunjeldho is a 2021 Indian Malayalam-language romantic comedy film written and directed by Mathukkutty (in his directorial debut). The movie is produced by Suvin K Varkey and Prasobh Krishna for their studio Little Big Films. Asif Ali plays the leading role in this film.

The film was scheduled to be released on 27 August 2021 during the occasion of Onam, but was postponed due to closure of theatres in Kerala.

== Synopsis ==
Kunjeldho is a love story between college students, filled with the usual campus fun, fights and a farewell function which brings a twist in the life of Kunjeldho and his girlfriend Niveditha.

Kunjeldho is struck at first sight by Niveditha, as they start their lives as college students. She quickly loses her heart to him as well, and at a college function, the couple consummate their love. The couple have to leave home and after struggling to find a home and survive, they are taken in by a kind professor. Will the couple finally win the support of their family forms the rest of the story.

== Cast ==
- Asif Ali as Kunjeldho
- Gopika Udayan as Niveditha
- Vineeth Sreenivasan as Junior doctor
- Siddique as Professor Gheevarghese
- Rekha as Kunjeldho's mother
- Meera Nair
- Mithun M Das as Ikru
- Anil Murali
- Sanju Sanichen as Pamp Saneesh
- Anarkali Nazar
- Sudheesh as John, Kunjeldho's father
- Aswathy Sreekanth as Teacher
- Akhil Manoj as Sooraj
- Abin Paul as Brother Joby
- Jasnya Jayadeesh
- Kritika Pradeep as Shalini
- Arjun Gopal
- Akku Melparamba
- Roopesh Peethambaran
- Haritha Haridas
- Shruthi Rajanikanth
- Margret Antony

=== Filming ===
Principal photography began on 2 September 2019 with a customary pooja function held at Kottayam. Filming took place early in the schedule at Aluva, Perumbavoor, Thodupuzha and Paravoor.

== Reception ==
Malayala Manorama gave a rating of 3.5/5 and said "Kunjeldho will remain an aesthetically driven and brilliantly narrated love story". Times of India gave a rating of 3.5/5 and said 'Kunjeldho' is a feel good movie with campus antics, love, emotions and songs.
