= Queen Elizabeth (2023 film) =

2023 film by M Padmakumar

- Theatrical release poster
- Directed by: M. Padmakumar
- Written by: Arjun T. Sathyan
- Produced by: Ranjith Manambarakkat; M. Padmakumar; Sreeram Manambarakkat
- Starring: Meera Jasmine; Narain
- Cinematography: Jithu Damodar
- Edited by: Akhilesh Mohan
- Music by: Ranjin Raj
- Production company: Blue Mount Production
- Distributed by: ZEE5
- Release date: 28 December 2023
- Country: India
- Language: Malayalam
- Budget: ₹3 crore

Queen Elizabeth is a 2023 Indian Malayalam-language film directed by M. Padmakumar and produced by Ranjith Manambarakkat, M. Padmakumar, and Sreeram Manambarakkar. It features Meera Jasmine in the title role, with Narain, as the main male lead. The other supporting cast includes Shwetha Menon, Johny Antony, Neena Kurup, Jude Anthany Joseph, Manju Pathros, and V. K. Prakash. The film was released theatrically on 29 December 2023. Subsequently, it premiered on ZEE5 on 14 February 2024.

== Plot ==
Elizabeth is a headstrong, short-tempered, and unmarried woman who leads a simple life. While she is frowned upon by the people around her, Alex is in a pursuit to win her over. Things change when Elizabeth goes to Coimbatore for a business meeting. She learns that she is diagnosed with stage 3 pancreatic cancer and she has just three more months to live. She soon changes her character and befriends her employees and molds her relationship with her family. She becomes close to Alex and slowly falls in love with him. Towards the end, Elizabeth discloses her health issue to Alex, and they visit Dr. Vysakh. It is revealed that the doctor who consulted Elizabeth was suffering from a mental disorder due to her child's death from pancreatic cancer and that Elizabeth does not have cancer. The climax shows Elizabeth married to Alex and living happily.

== Cast ==
- Meera Jasmine as Elizabeth Angel Simon
- Narain as Alex
- Shwetha Menon as Dr. Shanti Krishna
- Johny Antony as Varghese Pothan
- Neena Kurup as Salomi
- Jude Anthany Joseph as Abin
- Manju Pathrose as Sheeba
- V. K. Prakash as Simon
- Ramesh Pisharody as Abhilash
- Vineeth Vishwam as Sumesh
- Mallika Sukumaran as Gracy
- Arya as Sangeetha
- Shruthi Rajanikanth as Roshni
- Saniya Babu as Rose
- Anjana Appukuttan as Sindhu
- Renji Panicker as Dr Vysakh
- Master Vashisht as Jagan
- Chithra Nair as Arya
- Pearle Maaney as celebrity

== Production ==
The film saw the lead cast Meera Jasmine and Narain reuniting after 17 years after they were seen together in Achuvinte Amma (2005), Ore Kadal (2007) and Minnaminnikoottam (2008). The shoots of Queen Elizabeth started in Kochi in April 2023 and was wrapped by 1 May 2023.

== Music ==
Queen Elizabeth's songs and background score was composed by Ranjin Raj. The lyrics were penned by Shibu Chakravarthy & Joe Paul.

Track	Song title	Singer(s)	Lyricist	Length
1	"Pookkale Vaanile"	K. S. Harisankar	Shibu Chakravarthy	03:28
2	"Chembakapooventhe"	Haricharan	Joe Paul	03:48
3	"Aa Paatham"	Hesham Abdul Wahab	Anwar Ali	03:32
4	"Nee Polum Ariyaathe"	Kapil Kapilan	Santhosh Varma	03:28

== Reception ==
The movie generated positive reviews. Onmanorama commented, “The movie is quite charming and will work for those who prefer watching films in the romantic comedy genre. Malayalam Samayam rated it 3 out of 5. OTT Play also rated it 3 out of 5 while commenting, “The movie satisfies the criteria for a family entertainer.”
