= Neeraja =

2023 Film

- Release poster
- Directed by: Rajesh K. Raman
- Written by: Rajesh K. Raman
- Based on: Nathicharami by Mansore
- Produced by: Uma; M. Ramesh Reddy
- Starring: Shruti Ramachandran; Guru Somasundaram; Govind Padmasoorya
- Cinematography: Ragesh Narayanan
- Edited by: Ayoob Khan
- Music by: Sachin Shankor Mannath
- Production company: Suraj Production
- Release date: 2 June 2023
- Country: India
- Language: Malayalam

Neeraja is a 2023 Indian Malayalam-language drama film written and directed by Rajesh K. Raman. The film stars Shruti Ramachandran, Guru Somasundaram, Govind Padmasoorya, Jinu Joseph, and Srinda. It is a remake of the 2018 Kannada film Nathicharami. It was produced by Uma and M. Ramesh Reddy under the banner of Suraj Production. It was released in theatres on 2 June 2023.

== Cast ==
- Shruti Ramachandran as Neeraja
- Guru Somasundaram as Psychologist
- Govind Padmasoorya as Alex
- Kalesh Ramanand as Anumohan
- Jinu Joseph as Arun
- Srinda as Meera
- Abhija Sivakala as Chitra
- Reghunath Paleri as Alex’s father
- Santhosh Keezhattoor as Neeraja’s Boss
- Kottayam Ramesh as Neeraja’s father
- Sminu Sijo as Neeraja’s mother
- Shruthi Rajanikanth as Anjali
- Ramachandran as Arun Boss
- Sijin as Kalesh

== Production ==
The first look poster of the film was released on 8 March 2023. Later the trailer was released.

== Release ==
The film was scheduled to release on 19 May 2023 but it was postponed to 2 June 2023, announced the makers.

== Reception ==
Gopika Is of Times of india gave a rating of two out of five, stating that "Perhaps due to how the screenplay was written, Neeraja turned out to be a person who was unrelatable to an extent with the way she handled the changes in her life and how all of a sudden, she recovers". Anandu Suresh of Indian Express gave one and half stars out of five and stated that "The film suffers greatly due to a lack of comprehension regarding female emotions, particularly in scenes that necessitate a deeper understanding".

Princy Alexander of Onmanorama wrote that "since 'Neeraja' is a little more emotional than the original, some of the scenes feel stretched. However, given that, all the actors did a fine job of elevating the film".
