= Priyanka Kandwal =

Indian television and film actress

- Born: Priyanka Kandwal; 18 July 1994 (age 31); Dehradun, Uttarakhand, India
- Occupation: Actress
- Years active: 2013–present
- Known for: Mariam Khan; Style
- Height: 165 cm (5 ft 5 in)

Priyanka Kandwal (born 18 July 1994) is an Indian television and film actress. In 2013, she made her television debut with Zee TV's Pavitra Rishta as Dr. Gauri Shahane. In 2017, she portrayed the role of Shweta Kashyap in StarPlus's Jaana Na Dil Se Door. She was last seen as Mahira Khan in StarPlus's Mariam Khan - Reporting Live.

She made her cinematic debut with Style, Malayalam movie in 2016.

== Personal life ==
Kandwal was born and brought up in Dehradun, Uttarakhand. She did her higher studies in commerce and did her graduation from Dehradun. After her studies, she had decided to pursue her modeling career and appeared as a model in a few ads.

== Career ==
Kandwal made her acting debut with the role of Gauri in famous TV serial, Pavitra Rishta which telecasted on Zee TV. she made a debut in movies in a Kannada film, named Neenade Naa. She did the role of Pavi in that film opposite Prajwal Devaraj and Ankitha in the lead roles. After this film Kandwal had no chance to look back. Her role in that film also noticed by the South Indian directors. Bindu S was impressed by her work and asked her to do a movie with him. It was the way she debuted in Malayalam films. Her second film was named Style, where she did the role of Diya opposite Unni Mukundan. This film was released on 2 January 2016.

== Filmography ==
=== Film ===
Year	Film	Role	Language	Notes	Ref
2014	Neenade Naa	Pavi	Kannada	Kannada debut film	
2016	Style	Diya	Malayalam	Malayalam debut film	

=== Television ===
Year	Serial	Role
2013	Pavitra Rishta	Dr. Gauri Shahane (parallel role)
2017	Jaana Na Dil Se Door	Shweta Kashyap/Guddi (parallel role)
2018	Mariam Khan - Reporting Live	Mahira Khan/Mahira Ashraf (main role)
