= Theevram =

Indian Malayalam Language Film

- Theatrical poster
- Directed by: Roopesh Peethambaran
- Written by: Roopesh Peethambaran
- Produced by: V. C. Ismayil
- Starring: Dulquer Salmaan; Shikha Nair; Sreenivasan; Vinay Forrt
- Cinematography: Hari Nair
- Edited by: Kapil Gopalakrishnan (Kapil Krishna)
- Music by: Roby Abraham
- Production company: V. C. I. Movies
- Distributed by: LJ Films
- Release date: 13 November 2012
- Country: India
- Language: Malayalam
- Budget: ₹2 crore

Theevram (transl. Extreme) is a Malayalam-language neo-noir crime thriller film written and directed by Roopesh Peethambaran in his directorial debut, and starring Dulquer Salmaan, Shikha Nair, Sreenivasan, Vinay Forrt, Vishnu G Raghav, Riya Saira and Anu Mohan. The film is produced by V.C. Ismayil under the banner of VCI Movies and features music composed by Roby Abraham, while cinematography is handled by Hari Nair and editing by Kapil Gopalakrishnan. The film was distributed by Lal Jose under the banner of LJ Films. Audiography was done by M. R. Rajakrishnan.

The film has two narrative threads, one set in the present and the other set about five years earlier. The film was released on 13 November 2012 as a Diwali release. The film was dubbed into Tamil as Aaththiram in August 2016 and under the same original title in Hindi in 2017.

== Plot ==
The movie opens with a crime where a young man is beaten to death with a club in front of his fiancé. Then comes an investigation officer Alexander and his assistant Ramachandran. Though Alexander is intelligent enough to prove crimes, unlike others, he doesn't believe in torturing the accused people to prove crimes. Parallel to this, Harsha Vardhan, a man of mystery, lives lonely in a big house, and teaches music to a girl named Sophie. One day he kidnaps and brings an auto driver named Raghavan and tortures him in his house cellar. Alexander and Ramachandran take up the case, and upon investigation, Alexander suspects Harsha. He kills Raghavan, severs his body and then eradicates every single piece of evidence which could prove him guilty. Once the severed parts are found, the case heats up further, and Alexander realizes that it's a well planned murder, only after he finds Harsha had left the city without any notice.

The story then moves four years back. Harsha, as an aspiring young musician, struggles not only in his career, but also in his life to maintain his relationship with his lover Maya. After getting married, both of them, with their two more friends, Nimmy and Dr. Roy, start living together. One day, Maya joins a call center and gets miffed with Raghavan there on his careless driving. Harsha leaves for Chennai, and while he is away, Raghavan kidnaps Maya, kills her and buries her severed head to avoid suspicion. But Alexander and Ramachandran finds it out, and Raghavan is imprisoned. Harsha gets devastated by the loss of Maya and gets furious upon finding that first of all, Raghavan was given life imprisonment instead of the death penalty, and secondly, he got freed before time. He makes a plan along with his two friends to kills Raghavan. Nimmy starts using his auto and befriends him. One day, while going with him, Nimmy follows Harsha's plan, and as Raghavan takes her on a route through a forest, she suddenly jumps out. Raghavan is held by Harsha as he gets out of the auto. A fight takes place between them in which Harsha overpowers Raghavan and injects him into unconsciousness.

Then in the present, Nimmy and Roy are shown watching the news, which proves the system's failure in finding out the dead body's identity and that the case would go on with further investigations. Upon being asked by Ramachandran about what was to be their next action, Alexander smiles and replies that, "It's not Jesus Christ who has died. It's Judas. He'll have to die", after which he is accompanied by Ramachandran through his laughter, indicating that they won't disclose anything about Harsha.

== Cast ==
- Dulquer Salmaan as Harsha Vardhan
- Shikha Nair as Maya
- Sreenivasan as CI Alexander Kurian
- Vishnu G Raghav as Dr. Roy Philip, Harsha's friend
- Riya Saira as Nimmy
- Vinay Forrt as SI Ramachandran Nair
- Anu Mohan as Raghavan
- Janardhanan as SP Varma IPS
- Amala Rose Kurian as Maina, Raghavan's wife
- Baby Anjela
- Baby Andrea
- Sajid Yahiya as Immanuel
- P. Sreekumar as Maya's father
- Unni Mukundan as himself (Cameo)
- Aashiq Abu as himself (Cameo)
- Martin Prakkat as himself(Cameo)

== Production ==
=== Development ===
Dulquer joined Theevram after rejecting yet another promising film in the name of 'June' due to a date clash. The director had announced the film in December 2011. It was previously titled 'Maya'. The film features a fresh music director, Roby Abraham. The film is produced by V C Ismail, under the banner of VCI Movies. The film's distributor is the director Lal Jose. This is his 2nd distribution venture after Thattathin Marayathu, under the banner of LJ Films. The costume designer of the film is Sameera Saneesh.

=== Casting ===
During the planning of the film in late December, Fahad Fazil was cast to play the lead, but he had to drop the film due to a date clash. The director also had a difficult time finding many actors to play the characters in the film. After a successful debut in Second Show and after playing another highly appreciated role in Ustad Hotel, Dulquer Salmaan was a perfect choice for the director, in which he was chosen to play the role of Harsha Vardhan, a music composer who has a conflict with the legal system. Harsha Vardhan has the brutal mental outlook of an angry young man making the character Dulquer Salmaan was chosen to play a tough role with Negative shades. Sreenivasan was chosen to play a prominent role. Riya Saira was chosen after her performance as Tissa in the 2012 film '22 Female Kottayam', while the others chosen to play supporting roles were Janardhanan, Vinay Forrt, Anu Mohan, and Vishnu G Raghav. This will be the second movie that both Anu Mohan and Vishnu G Raghav are seen in after their debut film Orkut Oru Ormakoot. It gave Vishnu G Raghav a role which provided more scope to perform. Debutant actress Shikha Nair was chosen as the female lead, as the director felt it would be a great opportunity for the film to showcase a new actress. Shikha was a Chennai based model, who was being prepared for a Tamil debut started her career through this film.

=== Filming ===
The film started its shoot on 5 August 2012 at Kochi after the pooja ceremony which had directors Siddique, Anwar Rasheed and the lead actor Dulquer Salmaan lit the ceremonial lamp. Hari Nair is the director of photography. It is shot at various locations in and around Ernakulam, Alappuzha and Chalakudy.

== Soundtrack ==
Theevram

Soundtrack album by Roby Abraham
- Released: 2012
- Genre: Feature film soundtrack
- Producer: Roby Abraham

The music for the film has been composed by Roby Abraham. The lyrics have been penned by Arun K. Narayanan and Rafeeq Ahmed. Music Aloud's review rated the soundtrack 7.5/10.

Track #	Song	Singer(s)	Duration
1	"Innariyathe"	Vineeth Sreenivasan, Shweta Mohan	4:09
2	"Rudhira Suryan"	Vijay Yesudas	4:05
3	"Puthiyoru Pakalil"	Deepak Kutty	3:32
4	"Mannake Vinnake"	Roby Abraham	3:26

== Reception ==
=== Critical reception ===
Rediff.com rated the film 2.5/5, writing, "Theevram's interesting plot keeps its viewers gripped but leads to the lukewarm ending." Now Running rated the film 2.3/5, writing that, "The cumulative chill that you expect to work wonders in Roopesh Peethambaran's 'Theevram' is not there." The Times of India rated the film 2/5, writing, "What is lost is a sense of identification and purpose. The characters bemoan their loss, battle for justice and plot reprisal. But everything appears too distant and shallow to be felt."
