= Ahaana Krishna =

Indian actress (born 1995)

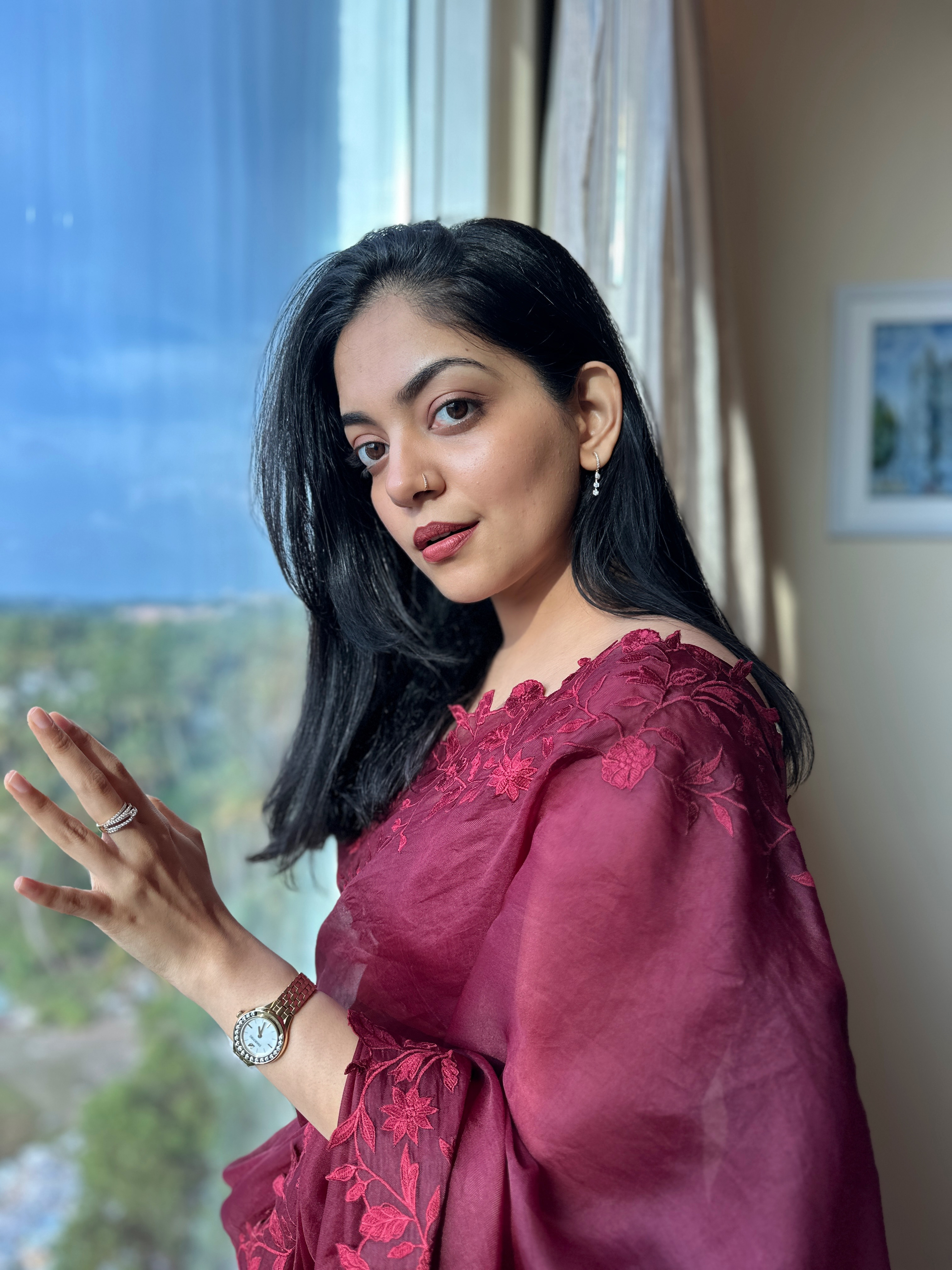
- Ahaana Krishna in 2023
- Born: 13 October 1995 (age 31); Thiruvananthapuram, Kerala, India
- Education: Holy Angel's ISC School; M.O.P. Vaishnav College for Women; Mudra Institute of Communication
- Occupation: Actress
- Years active: 2014–present
- Spouse: Nimish Ravi (m. 2026)
- Father: Krishna Kumar
- Relatives: 3 sisters including Ishaani Krishna

YouTube information
- Years active: 2015–present

Ahaana Krishna (born 13 October 1995) is an Indian YouTuber and actress, who appears primarily in Malayalam films. She made her film debut as lead heroine in Rajeev Ravi's Njan Steve Lopez in 2014.

== Early life ==
Ahaana was born as the eldest of the four daughters of actor Krishna Kumar and wife Sindhu Krishna at Thiruvananthapuram. She completed her schooling from Holy Angel's ISC School, Thiruvananthapuram. Ahaana won the title of "Ms LA Fest" in the Annual Inter-School arts festival hosted by Loyola School, Thiruvananthapuram. She then went to M.O.P. Vaishnav College for Women for higher studies. She earned a post-graduate certificate in advertising management and public relations from Mudra Institute of Communication, Ahmedabad too. She worked alongside her father in a serial.

== Career ==
Ahaana made her acting debut in 2014 with Rajeev Ravi's second directorial film Njan Steve Lopez. She then appeared in Njandukalude Nattil Oridavela in 2017 directed by Althaf Salim with Nivin Pauly.

In 2019, Ahaana starred in the romantic drama Luca along with Tovino Thomas. The film was a critical and commercial success, with praise directed to the performances of the leading actors which established her as a strong performer. The same year, she also appeared in Shanker Ramakrishnan's Pathinettam Padi.

== Personal life ==
On 13 September 2026, Ahaana married cinematographer Nimish Ravi.

== Filmography ==
Key
†	Denotes films that have not yet been released

=== Films ===
List of Ahaana Krishna film credits
Year	Title	Role	Notes	Ref.
2014	Njan Steve Lopez	Anjali	Debut film	
2017	Njandukalude Nattil Oridavela	Sarah Chacko		
2019	Luca	Niharika Banerjee		
2019	Pathinettam Padi	Annie		
2020	DOTS	Karuna		
2021	Pidikittapulli	Aswathy	Released on Jio Cinema	
2023	Adi	Geethika		
2023	Pachuvum Athbutha Vilakkum	Aishwarya	Cameo	
2025	Nancy Rani	Nancy Rani		
2025	Lokah Chapter 1: Chandra	Unnamed	Cameo	

=== Web series ===
- Me Myself & I (2022), Malavika

=== Television ===
- Grihapravesham (1997), Child artist
- Udan Panam 3.0 (2020), Participant –Along with family in an Onam special episode
- Red Carpet (2020), Mentor

=== Music videos ===
List of Ahaana Krishna music video credits
Year	Title	Music	Notes	Ref.
2016	Kari	Masala Coffee	Co-starring Fahim Safar	
2020	Lokam	Shabareesh Varma	Co-artists - Gauthami Nair, Shabareesh Varma, Mujeeb Majeed, Niranj Suresh, Resmi Sateesh	
2021	Thonnal	Govind Vasantha	Debut as Album Director; Vocals by Haniya Nafisa	
2026	Pookkal	JK	2nd Directoral Music Album	

== Discography ==
List of musical credits
Year	Song	Album
2017	Kaate Nee Veesharuthippol	Whispers and Whistles
2020	"Lokam"	Lokam
