= Mariam Khan – Reporting Live =

Indian television series

- Genre: Drama
- Written by: Saba Mumtaz; Yasir Iftikhar Khan
- Directed by: Majid Azam Ismail Umar khan
- Creative director: Siddhartha Vankar
- Starring: Deshna Duggad; Avinash Mishra; Priyanka Kandwal; Paras Kalnawat; Sheena Bajaj; Mahima Makwana; Param Singh
- Composer: Neeraj Shridhar
- Country of origin: India
- Original language: Hindi
- No. of seasons: 1
- No. of episodes: 170

Production
- Producers: Majid Azam; Afaque Azam
- Camera setup: Multi-camera
- Running time: 30 min approx
- Production company: Somersault Productions

Original release
- Network: StarPlus
- Release: 21 May 2018 – 11 January 2019

Mariam Khan – Reporting Live is an Indian television series that aired on Star Plus and Disney+ Hotstar. The series premiered on 21 May 2018, and was produced by Majid Azam and Afaque Azam. It starred Deshna Duggad, Avinash Mishra, Himmanshoo A. Malhotra, Priyanka Kandwal, Paras Kalnawat and Sheena Bajaj. The actors Mahima Makwana and Param Singh were introduced after a generation leap.

The show ended on 11 January 2019, completing 170 episodes, and was replaced by the serial Dil Toh Happy Hai Ji.

== Plot ==
Set in Bhopal, Mariam Khan is an imaginative and curious eight-year-old dyslexic child who doesn't take things at face value. She is the youngest member of a large family. Her grandfather is the patriarch. She idolizes her uncle and foster father Majaaz, an idealistic journalist and newspaper owner. She plans to be a reporter and shares an emotional bond with Majaaz. Her mother's only concern is marrying off her daughters, while Mariam plans to become a reporter. However, many years later, Mariam's real mother or Majaaz's sister, who left for Pakistan after marriage, comes back to retrieve Mariam. Emotionally blackmailing the family, she takes Mariam to Pakistan. Unaware, she learns that Majaaz is her uncle and she is brought here to use her bone narrow on her brother. In the hospital, Mariam's mother leaves her phone in Mariam's cabin. She uses it contact her family, thus, she is saved. Unbeknownst to the younger generation, Majaaz is accused of terrorism and shot dead after Rehaan gets shot dead due to misunderstanding plotted by Rifat that he belongs to terrorist group while a pilgrim, Anjum takes away young Mariam.

=== 10 years later ===
Grown up, Mariam adopts the name Manjeet Kaur to escape her past and begins living in Amritsar and working as an independent cab driver. While taking her passenger to meet Fawad (in fact her foster mother Madeeha's fraternal nephew), she is shocked to see Majaaz's photo in his hand. She suspects him and tries to learn more of her father.

Later on, Mariam learns that her ostensibly dead family is actually alive and her house didn't burn down. Madeeha's sister-in-law, and Zain and Fawad's mother, Rifat misled Mariam that they died so that she could own the ancestral home in her name. Mariam and Fawad fall in love. Alive, Majaaz turns out to be innocent and joins them. Fawad and Mariam get married.

Fawad and his ex-girlfriend, Bhakti's daughter, Cheeku enters. Later, it is exposed that she isn't his daughter. In reality, Rifat ask Bhakti to say so, but she refused. She then killed Bhakti and falsely stated that Cheeku is Fawad's daughter. Rifat is arrested. Mariam and Fawad adopt Cheeku, and everyone lives happily thereafter.

== Cast ==
=== Main ===
- Mahima Makwana as Mariam Khan Ashraf aka Manjeet Kaur: Aayat's daughter; Manjaaz and Madeesha's niece and adoptive daughter; Mahira, Meher and Rehaan's cousin; Fawad's wife (2018–2019)
  - Deshna Duggad as Young Mariam Khan (2018)
- Param Singh as Fawad Ashraf: Wasim and Rifat's younger son; Zain's brother; Mariam's husband (2018–2019)
  - Ashar Khan as Young Fawad Ashraf (2018)
- Avinash Mishra/Himanshu Malhotra as Zain Ashraf: Wasim and Rifat's elder son; Fawad's brother; Mahira's ex-husband; Meher's husband; Aliya's father (2018)/(2018–2019)
- Sheena Bajaj as Meher Khan: Majaaz and Madeeha's elder daughter; Mahira's sister; Mariam's cousin; Zain's wife; Aliya's aunt and mother figure (2018–2019)
- Priyanka Kandwal as Mahira Khan: Majaaz and Madeeha's younger daughter; Meher's sister; Mariam's cousin; Zain's ex-wife; Rehaan's girlfriend; Aliya's mother (2018)
- Paras Kalnawat as Rehaan Thakur: Sarfaraz's son; Mariam's cousin; Mahira's boyfriend; Aliya's father (2018)

=== Recurring ===
- Khalid Siddiqui as Majaaz Khan: Mahira and Meher's father, Mariam's adoptive father and uncle; Aayat's brother (2018–2019)
- Rukhsar Rehman as Madeeha Ashraf: Mahira and Meher's mother, Mariam's adoptive mother and aunt (2018–2019)
- Anju Mahendru as Pilgrim Shaheen Ahmed (2018–2019)
- Sagar Saini as Wasim Ashraf: Madeeha's brother, Zain and Fawad's father (2018–2019)
- S. M. Zaheer as Nawaz Ali Khan: Aijaaz's twin brother (2018)/Nawab Aijaaz Ali Khan: Majaaz and Aayat's father (2018–2019)
- Heena Rajput as Salima Ali Khan: Majaaz and Aayat's mother (2018)
- Lubna Salim as Rifat Ashraf: Zain and Fawad's mother (2018–2019)
- Vinod Kapoor as Sarfaraz Thakur: Rehaan's father and Mariam's paternal uncle (2018)
- Mansi Sharma as Aayat Khan: Majaaz's sister and Mariam's mother (2018)
- Atharva Phadnis as Lalwish "Lallu" Kirloskar (2018)
- Aarna Bhadoriya as Laxmi Narayan Gupta (2018)
- Ashutosh Priyadarshi as Sub Inspector
- Armaan Siddiqui: Rehaan's murderer (2018)
- Gauransh Sharma as Akshay Agarwal (2018)
- Shefali Rana as Asha Mehta (2018)
- Kimmy Kaur as Humdum Khan (2018)
- Honey Kamboj as Farhan Hassan (2018)
- Lavina Tandon as Aarshifa Haider (2018)
- Rajesh Singh as Ballu (2018)
- Unknown as Cheeku Ashraf: Fawad and Mariam's adopted daughter (2019)
- Unknown as Golu Zain Ashraf
- Unknown as Aliya Ashraf: Zain and Mahira's daughter (2018-2019)
- Ahmad Harhash as Muneer Ali Khan (2018–2019)

=== Special appearances ===
- Surveen Chawla as Shaira Fakih (2018)

== Soundtrack ==
Mariam Khan Reporting Live Original Sound Track

Soundtrack album by Rahul Jain
- Genre: Romance; Soundtrack
- Language: Hindi

Mariam Khan Reporting Live's soundtrack is written and composed by Rahul Jain. O Rangrez, sung by Rahul Jain was released on 21 May 2018.

Mariam Khan Reporting Live: Tracklisting
No.	Title	Artist	Length
1.	"O Rangrez" (Male)	Rahul Jain	4:22
2.	"Jannu Na" (Male)	Rahul Jain	3:33

Neeraj Shridhar sung and composed the title track of this show.

== Production ==
The show took over the time slot of Yeh Hai Mohabbatein and the latter was shifted to late night slot.

In September 2018, actress Priyanka Kandwal quit the show as she doesn't want to age after the leap. In the same month, actor Avinash Mishra quit as he was dissatisfied with the screen time given to his character. Paras Kalnawat also quit the show as he was disappointment with the makers as they didn't offer him the lead character role as they promised after makers did a sad ending to his character Rehaan, the worst suffering character of show by his tragic death.

It initially started Deshna Dugad. Owing to low ratings, the storyline took a leap which started Mahima Makwana and Param Singh.
