= Nancy Rani =

2025 Indian film

- Official poster
- Directed by: Joseph Manu James
- Written by: Joseph Manu James
- Produced by: Rajesh George Kulangara
- Starring: Ahaana Krishna; Aju Varghese; Arjun Ashokan; Lal; Lena; Sunny Wayne; Vishak Nair
- Cinematography: Ragesh Narayanan
- Edited by: Amith C. Mohanan
- Music by: Songs: Manu Gopinath; Tao Issaro; Amith C. Mohanan; Nihal Murali; Abhith Chandran; Steve Manuel Jomi; Midhun Madhu; Vineeth Esthaphan; Background Score: Vineeth Esthaphan; Swathi Manu Pratheek
- Production company: Reporter Films
- Distributed by: YouTube
- Release date: 18 June 2025
- Country: India
- Language: Malayalam

Nancy Rani is a 2025 Indian Malayalam-language drama film written and directed by Joseph Manu James. The film was completed posthumously by his wife, Naina, following his death in early 2023. It stars Ahaana Krishna in the title role, with an ensemble cast including Aju Varghese, Arjun Ashokan, Lal, Sreenivasan (in his final film appearance), Lena, Sunny Wayne, Vishak Nair, Mallika Sukumaran, Indrans, and Mamukkoya. The film was released on 18 June 2025 directly on YouTube.

The Film focuses on Nancy, a die-hard Mammootty fan, from a modest background, wishes to be an actress as she faces challenges throughout her life.

== Plot ==
Nancy Rani is a young woman from a modest background with dreams of becoming an actress. She idolizes the legendary actor Mammootty and aspires to meet him someday. The film recounts the challenges she faces in the film industry and her personal life, highlighting her perseverance, aspirations, and the sacrifices she makes to pursue her dreams.

== Cast ==
- Ahaana Krishna as Nancy Rani
  - Thennal Abhilash as Young Nancy
- Arjun Ashokan as Director Raj
- Aju Varghese as Dr. Iype Ibraham
- Sunny Wayne as Sunny (Cameo Appearance)
- Lal as Akkaraparambil Chackochan
- Sreenivasan as Mess Mohan
- Lena as Sister Clare
- Vishak Nair as Motti
- Mallika Sukumaran as Yamuna, Raj's mother
- Indrans as Mani
- Mamukkoya as Kuttanpilla
- Maala Parvathi as Parvathy Menon
- Pauly Valsan as servant
- Irshad Ali as Arnold Perumal
- Sooraj Thelakkad as Unni Valyaveettil
- Abu Salim as Vava
- Vishnu Govind as Appukuttan
- Sohan Seenulal as Kozhi Soman
- Devi Ajith as Dr. Arundhati
- Aneesh G Menon as Vivek Khan
- Sudheer Karamana as Idiyan Idikkula
- Azees Nedumangad as Politician
- Pradeep Kottayam
- Nandu Poduval as Karadi Achan
- Dhruvan as Ashik Peter James
- Achudanadan as Achuvettan
- Kottayam Ramesh as Professor Vinod Kumar
- Kottayam Purushan as Security
- Baby as Doctor
- Shine C George as Relative
- Franko Davis as Jaison Disouza
- Jolly Chiriyath as Motti's mother
- Irena Mohini Mihalkovich as Theresa
- Vetri as Himself
- Miah Essa Mehak as singer
- Shankaran as Mammootty fan

== Production ==
The film’s production began in early 2020. It experienced multiple difficulties during shooting, including lack of clear planning, scheduling conflicts, and some on-set tensions. Director Joseph Manu James reportedly faced health issues and struggled with managing the set. He died in February 2023 before completing the film. His wife Nyna took responsibility for finishing the project, overseeing post-production to bring the film to release.

== Release ==
The film planned for theatrical release multiple times but was postponed due to director's demise, financial and legal issues. Nancy Rani was released directly on the digital platform YouTube on 18 June 2025, under the Speed Audio & Video channel.

== Controversies ==
The release of Nancy Rani was accompanied by a major public controversy involving lead actress Ahaana Krishna and Nyna, the widow of director Joseph Manu James. The dispute centered around promotional obligations, working conditions, and personal accusations exchanged through media and social platforms.

=== Promotional Dispute ===
Shortly before the film’s digital release, Nyna publicly accused Ahaana Krishna of refusing to participate in the film’s promotional activities. At a press meet, she stated that Ahaana had been fully compensated and was contractually obligated to take part in the promotion, but chose to distance herself from the project. Nyna appealed to Ahaana to show "humanitarian consideration," especially given the film was the late director’s last work and a tribute to his vision.

=== Ahaana Krishna’s Response ===
Ahaana Krishna responded to the allegations through a detailed statement shared on her social media handles. In the statement, she explained her reasons for staying away from promotions:

- She alleged that the filming process was chaotic and emotionally distressing, with constant delays, mismanagement, and lack of professional planning.
- She claimed that the production had used a dubbing artist to complete her lines without her knowledge or consent, and also suggested that a body double may have been used to shoot scenes after her part was completed.
- Ahaana also said she was subjected to personal defamation, alleging that Nyna had spread rumors to damage her reputation, including comments directed at her family.
- While she considered taking legal action at the time of filming, she ultimately chose not to proceed out of respect for the director’s sudden death.

She emphasized that her contract covered only acting duties, and she had not agreed to participate in post-release promotion. She also stated that the ongoing narrative being circulated was, in her view, a strategic move to gain sympathy and attention for the film.

=== Technician Allegations and Production Issues ===
Several crew members and technicians associated with Nancy Rani later came forward in support of actress Ahaana Krishna’s claims, stating that the production experienced serious disruptions. According to their accounts, the shoot extended far beyond its original schedule due to mismanagement. They alleged that the director, Joseph Manu James, was frequently under the influence of alcohol on set, with assistant directors reportedly joining him. Although shoots were often scheduled for 9 AM, filming would not begin until late afternoon, causing widespread dissatisfaction among cast and crew.

The technicians also stated that the film's script changed significantly after initial schedules and that the final film did not resemble the original narrative. One crew member claimed that actress Ahaana Krishna opted out of dubbing after the director allegedly spoke inappropriately to her mother over the phone. As a result, her voice was dubbed by someone else without her consent.

Additionally, multiple technicians claimed they were never paid for their work. A camera operator revealed that he was owed ₹3 lakhs and had filed a legal complaint. He said that the director had promised to resolve the matter before the film’s release, but passed away before it could be settled. The producer later deferred the matter, citing his absence abroad.
