= Dain Davis =

Indian film actor and television host

- Born: 20 January 1995 (age 31); Ollur, Thrissur, Kerala, India
- Other name: DD
- Occupations: Actor; comedian; TV host
- Years active: 2016–present

Dain Davis (born 20 January 1995) often known as DD is an Indian actor, comedian and television host, who works in Malayalam-language films and television shows. He won the talent hunt show Komady Circus (2016) telecasted by Mazhavil Manorama. He has hosted talent-hunt show Nayika Nayakan (2018) and Udan Panam 3.O (2020–22).

== Early life and education ==
Dain Davis was born in Ollur in Thrissur district of Kerala, India. His father is a hotel owner and worked in Kuwait, and his mother, Rosemol is a beautician. He has an elder brother. He graduated in visual communication from Divine Institute of Media Studies in Muringoor.

== Career ==
In 2016, Davis won the talent hunt reality show Komady Circus on Mazhavil Manorama. He is titled as best actor. He then went on to host Nayika Nayakan where he was given the nickname 'DD' by his co-anchor Pearle Maaney.

In 2017 he had his film debut in the Malayalam language horror film E, directed by Kukku Surendran. In 2018 he had a part in the film Pretham 2, directed by Ranjith Sankar.

In 2019 he co-hosted Super Singer, a television music reality show on Surya TV with Ranjini Haridas.

From 2020 to 2022, he hosted Udan Panam 3.0 on the Mazhavil Manorama with Meenakshi Raveendran.

== Filmography ==
=== Films ===
Key
†	Denotes films that have not yet been released

Year	Title	Role	Notes	Ref.
2017	E	Alex		
2017	Chembarathipoo	Vinod's friend		
2018	Kuttanpillayude Sivarathri	Vishakan		
2018	Kamuki	Jaffer		
2018	Ottakoru Kaamukan	Josekutty		
2018	Pretham 2	Jofin T. Chacko		
2021	Varthamanam			
2022	Aviyal	Sajeash Kanadiparambil		
2022	Veekam	Thomas		
2023	Iru			
2023	Oh My Darling	Vineeth		
2023	Boomerang	Jerry		
2023	Kolla	Sugeeth		
2024	Hunt	Kunjariya		
2024	Thrayam			
TBA	Pathimoonnam Rathri †		Filming	

=== Web series ===
Year	Title	Role	Platform	Ref.
2024	1000 Babies	Suneer	JioHotstar	
2026– present	Prince of Mollywood	Firoz	JioHotstar	

=== Television ===
Year	Show	Role	Channel	Notes	Ref.
2016	Komady Circus	Contestant	Mazhavil Manorama	Winner- Best actor award	
2018	Nayika Nayakan	Host	Mazhavil Manorama	Co-host with Pearle Maaney	
2019	Surya Super Singer	Host	Surya TV	Co-host with Renjini Haridas	
2019	Uppum Mulakum	Sidharth	Flowers TV		
2020	Lockdown Please	Various roles	Flowers TV		
2020-2022	Udan Panam 3.0	Host	Mazhavil Manorama	Co-host with Meenakshi Raveendran	
2022	Kutti Kalavara Seniors	Host	Flowers TV		
2022–2023	Udan Panam: Chapter 4	Host	Mazhavil Manorama	Co-host with Meenakshi Raveendran	
2023	Mass Onam	Host	Flowers TV		
2023	Chill and Chat	Host	ManoramaMax		
2023-2024	Musical Wife Season 1	Host	Flowers TV		
2024-2025	Flowers top Singer season 5	Co-Host	Flowers TV		
2025-2026	Musical Wife Season 2	Host	Flowers TV		
2026	Comedy Cooks	Pookie	Asianet		

==== Special appearances ====
Year	Show	Role	Channel	Notes	Ref.
2018	Comedy Utsavam	Guest	Flowers TV		
2019	D5 Junior	Guest	Mazhavil Manorama		
2019	Day with a Star (Season 4)	Guest	Kaumudy TV		
2020	Immini Baliya Naavu	Guest	Surya Comedy		
2021	Atham Pathu Ruchi	Guest	Mazhavil Manorama		
2022	Super Fun Kudumbam	Contestant	Mazhavil Manorama		
2023	The Next Top Anchor	Himself	ManoramaMax		
2024	Udan Panam 5	Guest host	Mazhavil Manorama	1000 episode celebration	
2026	Bigg Boss 8	Guest	Asianet		
