= You Too Brutus (film) =

- Theatrical Release poster
- Directed by: Roopesh Peethambaran
- Written by: Dialogues: Mathukkutty; Roopesh Peethambaran; Dialogues (Hindi): Sony Chandy
- Screenplay by: Roopesh Peethambaran
- Story by: Roopesh Peethambaran
- Produced by: Sheikh Afsal
- Starring: Sreenivasan; Asif Ali; Tovino Thomas; Ahmed Sidhique; Anu Mohan; Honey Rose; Rachana Narayanankutty; Ena Saha; Delna Davis
- Cinematography: Swaroop Philip
- Edited by: Abhinav Sunder Nayak
- Music by: Roby Abraham
- Production company: Round Up Cinema
- Distributed by: Popcorn Entertainments (Asia Pacific); Kalasangham Films
- Release date: 20 March 2015; (India)
- Running time: 101 minutes
- Country: India
- Language: Malayalam

You Too Brutus is a 2015 Malayalam comedy film scripted and directed by Roopesh Peethambaran with Malayalam dialogues co-written by Mathukutty and Roopesh Peethambaran, and Hindi dialogues penned by Sony Chandy. The film was produced by Sheikh Afsal under the banner of Round Up Cinema. It features an ensemble cast including Sreenivasan, Asif Ali, Tovino Thomas, Honey Rose, Anu Mohan, Delna Davis, Rachana Narayanankutty, Ahmed Sidhique and Ena Saha. The film was released on 20 March 2015 and became an average grosser at Kerala box office.

== Plot ==
The story revolves around the paradoxical elements of love and betrayal which lead to bizarre endings. The film is filled with sub-plots and ends with the beginning of possible sub-plots.

Hari is a landlord who shelters Arun, Tovino, and Vicky. Hari is a well-known painter and is in love with Muktha. Abhi is Hari's brother and Vicky's friend. Vicky is a womaniser with a live-in girlfriend, Tina, who cheats on him with another man for a stable relationship. Abhi, who runs a music studio, is married to Aparna but is having an extramarital affair with Shirly. Tovino is a gym trainer who cajoles older women for gifts and is an aspiring playboy.

Arun is also involved with an under-age girl Diya, who herself has ulterior motives. His poor judgements make his life troublesome. Unni is Hari's domestic help who desires to be like Vicky and Tovino, as a skilled womanizer. The story weaves in and out these characters with tight and loosened grip of drama and humour.

== Cast ==
- Sreenivasan as Hari
- Asif Ali as Abhi
- Tovino Thomas as Tovino
- Honey Rose as Shirly
- Rachana Narayanankutty as Aparna
- Ahmed Sidhique as Arun
- Ena Saha as Diya
- Muktha as Dance Teacher
- Anu Mohan as Vicky
- Delna Davis as Tina
- Sudhi Koppa as Unni
- Rony David as Music director
- Molly Kannamaly as Aunty
- Gokulan as Urumis
- Remadevi as Gym Aunty
- Deepak Parambol as Hero at the hospital (cameo)

== Release ==
The film was released on 20 March 2015 in 70 screens across kerala.

=== Critical reception ===
Sify wrote that the film was inspired by Latin American movie styles. The Times of India gave the film 3 stars out of 5, identifying the film as targeting a young and urban audience. Indiaglitz.com agreed about the target audience and called the film "shallow and desperate". Rediff gave the film 2 stars out of 5 and wrote, "The message from You Too Brutus is that human relationships are fragile but the way it is conveyed leaves us with a bad taste in the mouth".

=== Rights ===
The satellite rights of the movie were bagged by Surya TV.
