= Oru Mexican Aparatha =

Malayalam film

- Poster
- Directed by: Tom Emmatty
- Written by: Tom Emmatty
- Produced by: Anoop Kannan
- Starring: Tovino Thomas; Neeraj Madhav; Roopesh Peethambaran; Gayathri Suresh; Ajith P. V.
- Narrated by: Ranjith
- Cinematography: Prakash Velayudhan
- Edited by: Shameer Muhammed
- Music by: Songs: Manikandan Ayyappa; Additional Song: Renjith Chittade; Score: Gopi Sundar
- Production company: Anoop Kannan Stories
- Distributed by: Anoop Kannan Stories Release
- Release date: 3 March 2017
- Country: India
- Language: Malayalam
- Budget: ₹ 2.68 crore
- Box office: ₹ 21 crore

Oru Mexican Aparatha (English: A Mexican Crime) is a 2017 Indian Malayalam-language propaganda drama film directed by Tom Emmatty (in his directorial debut). The film stars Tovino Thomas, Neeraj Madhav, and Roopesh Peethambaran. It was released on 3 March 2017 in India. The movie was a blockbuster at the box office and served as a major breakthrough for Tovino Thomas as it established him as one of the biggest leading stars in Malayalam cinema.

== Plot ==
Sakhavu Kochaniyan is a strong leftist who, during The Emergency period, conducted a successful protest and established the SFY party in the famous Maharaja's College, Ernakulam. However, he is soon betrayed by a comrade and killed by the police, shouting the phrase 'Inquilab Zindabad!' to his last breath.

Now, in the mid-2000s, the college is under the leadership of the KSQ activists Roopesh, Shiyaz, and their fellow activists. Paul is a student from Thrissur who has come to the college to study. He is a typical student and becomes friends with Subhash, Joby, and Krishnan, and starts to fall in love with Anu. Subhash has long hated the KSQ's leadership and their abuse of power in the college and plans to re-introduce the SFY party in the college before the next election. Subhash is shown as a clever, left-wing ideologist, and tries to bring his friends, including Paul, into the party. Krishnan, who came from Irinjalakuda, is also seen as a strong figure, but not completely absorbed in the leftist ideology. There is eventually a skirmish between Subhash's gang and a bunch of people led by KSQ activist Kanjan, but it's stopped safely.

Meanwhile, Paul tells Anu that he loves her, and she tells him, as a joke, that she loves him back. Paul falls under the illusion that it's real love and not friendship. In a local Kalolsavam, Roopesh and his party select the students who are taking part, but they reject a girl who wants to participate in four activities. Seeing this, Subhash decides to sign the girl up for the Kalotsavam without the others knowing. The girl wins but Roopesh cunningly makes the girl join his group and takes all the credit.

== Cast ==
- Tovino Thomas in a dual role as:
  - Paul Varghese
  - Kochaniyan
- Neeraj Madhav as Subhash
- Roopesh Peethambaran as Roopesh
- Gayathri Suresh as Anu
- Sudheer Karamana
- Brijila Ragesh as Nilina, a student
- Sudhi Koppa as Lonappan
- Hareesh Peradi
- Manesh Kumar
- Subeesh Sudhi as Rajeshettan
- Kalabhavan Shajon as Shiyaz
- Ajith P V as Student
- Jino John as Shibu Chittilapally aka Kanjan
- Anas Haneef
- Meghna Nair
- Anjali P Nair
- Megha Mathew as Ardra
- Vishnu Govindan as Jomey
- Sarath Chandran as Rohit
- Akhil Nambolan
- Sobin Mazhaveedu
- Vimal Kumar as Ullaass
- Sunil Sukhada as Collage Sir

== Differences from history ==
In real life, Jino John, a Kerala Students Union (KSU, which is shown to be KSQ in the film) representative, won against the left-aligned Students' Federation of India (SFI, depicted as SFY in the film) candidate in the Maharajas College union elections on 1 October 2010. It was after almost 30 years that a KSU leader became the chairman of Maharajas College. Jino also acted in the movie as a KSQ activist. Indian diplomat, Venu Rajamony, was the last person who was elected as the chairman from the panel of KSU during 1980–81. Many criticised it as a rewriting of very recent history in favour of left-wing politics using the convenience of cinematic liberty.

A leftist leader named Kochaniyan is shown to be studying at the same college in Ernakulam in the flashback of the film. The character he was based on was a real person by the name of R. K. Kochaniyan, who was a student of Sri C. Achutha Menon Government College, Thrissur, and a member of SFI Thrissur District Committee. He was also the College Union General Secretary and was killed by KSU activists at Calicut University Art Fest in the year 1992.

== Filming ==
The film was shot mainly in Maharaja's College, Ernakulam and FACT in Kochi.

== Overseas ==
The overseas distribution rights of the film Oru Mexican Aparatha are handled by Josemon Simon.

== Soundtrack ==
Track listing
No.	Title	Lyrics	Music	Singer(s)	Length
1.	"Emanmare Emanmare"	Renjith Chittade	Renjith Chittade	Shebin Mathew	2:06
2.	"Aakaasha Kuda"	Rafeeq Ahammed	Manikandan Ayyappa	Nithin Raj & Sulfiq.L
3.	"Ivalaaro"	Rafeeq Ahammed	Manikandan Ayyappa	Vijay Yesudas
4.	"Munneraan Samayamayi"	Anil Panachooran	Manikandan Ayyappa	Franko
5.	"Kalippu Katta Kalippu"	Tom Emmatty	Manikandan Ayyappa	Arunraja Kamaraj; Manikandan Ayyappan

== Reception ==
The film grossed ₹2.07 crore on the opening day at the Kerala box office with a distributor's share of ₹98 lakh. Asianet bought the Satellite rights of the film for an amount of 3.25 crores. The producer Anoop Kannan earned approximately 10 crores in profit from this movie.
