= Muringur Vadakkummuri =

- village
- Location in Kerala, India Muringur Vadakkummuri (India)
- Country: India
- State: Kerala
- District: Thrissur

Population (2011)
  - Total: 4,981

Languages
  - Official: Malayalam, English
- Time zone: UTC+5:30 (IST)
- PIN: 6XXXXX
- Vehicle registration: KL-

Muringur Vadakkummuri is a village in Thrissur district in the state of Kerala, India.

== Demographics ==
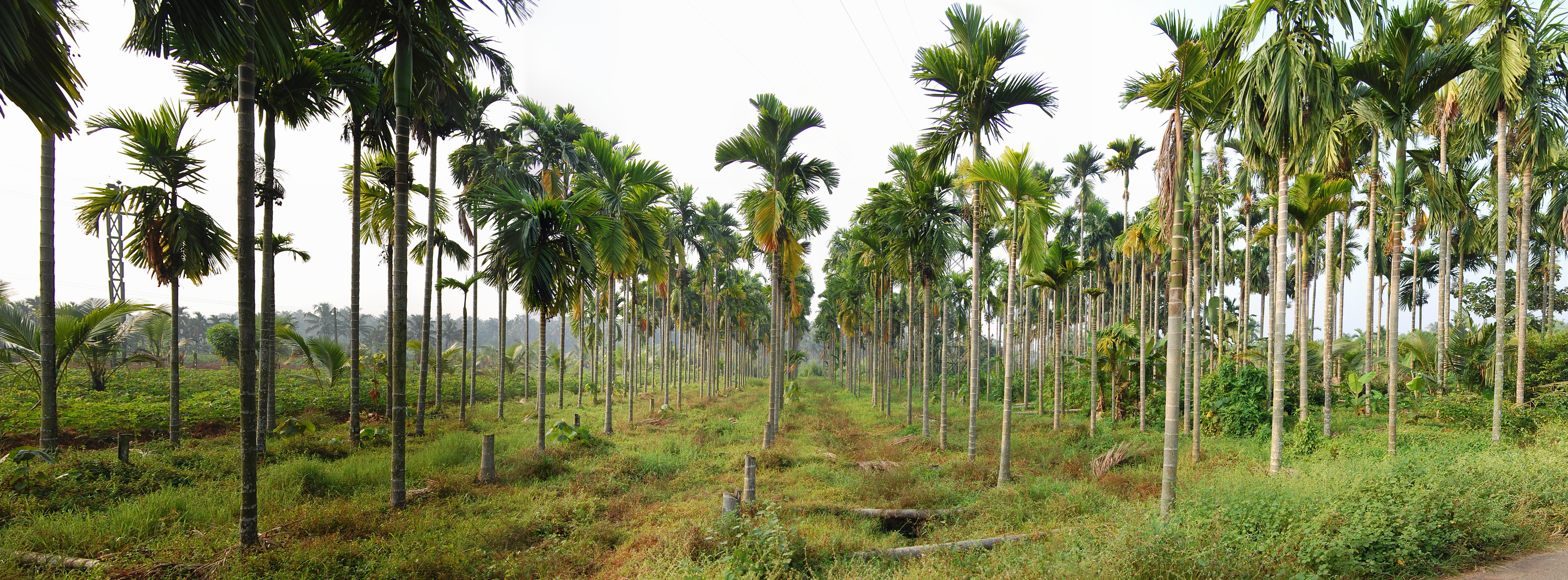
Areca farm

As of 2011 India census, Muringur Vadakkummuri had a population of 4981 with 2281 males and 2700 females.
