= Ithihasa =

2014 film by Binu Sadanandan

- Theatrical release poster
- Directed by: Binu Sadanandan
- Written by: Aneesh Lee Ashok; Anil Narayanan
- Produced by: Rajesh Augustine
- Starring: Anusree; Shine Tom Chacko; Sathya; Swapna Menon; Balu Varghese; Divya Prabha; Arun Sol
- Cinematography: Sinoj P. Ayyappan
- Edited by: Jovin John
- Music by: Deepak Dev
- Production company: ARK Media
- Distributed by: ARK Release
- Release date: 10 October 2014 (India)
- Running time: 150 minutes
- Country: India
- Language: Malayalam

Ithihasa is a 2014 Indian Malayalam-language fantasy comedy film directed by Binu Sadanandan and written by Aneesh Lee Ashok and Anil Narayanan. The film tells the story of body swapping between a conservative young software professional Janaki (Anusree) and an easy going young pickpocketer, Alvy (Shine Tom Chacko). The music was composed by Deepak Dev.

The film received positive reviews from critics and audiences. It turned out to be a sleeper hit and was especially praised for the humour, music and screenplay. It is inspired from the 2002 Hollywood film The Hot Chick and the 1992 Telugu film Jamba Lakidi Pamba. A spiritual successor to the film titled Mask starring Shine Tom Chacko and Chemban Vinod Jose was released in 2019.

== Plot ==
The story, set in Kochi is about the body swapping of a shrewd pickpocketer Alvy and a conservative software professional Janaki. Alvy, a thief and his friend Vikki come in possession of a pair of stolen magic rings. One of the rings is lost and makes its way to Janaki, who wins it in a game from a shopping centre. At night both try their respective rings. The next day they realize that they are in different bodies - Alvy wakes up in Janaki's body and vice versa. Janaki's friends try to find a cure for this but fails. Alvy and Vikki enjoy their days and Janaki and her friends enjoys their day when both of them comes face to face. The next day Janaki's mother & grandmother arrive at her home to see her & they bring Alvy to impersonate as Janaki. Gradually they fall in love with each other. One day they get a call saying that they can get help from a historian.

They reveal their situation and he asks them to think about anything that happened to them in last 15 days. They reveal that they got a ring as a gift. Janaki(in Alvy's body) shows a picture of the ring, and the historian reveals that the ring swaps the bodies of the wearers, and they have to change back within 15 days (today before the sunset being the last day) or they will be like this forever. Both of them find the rings, but before putting it on, Janaki (in Alvy's body) gets kidnapped by some Hindi speaking smugglers, who need that ring. Alvy (in Janaki's body) comes to beat them up, but the bad guys overpower her. Vikki pickpockets the ring from the leader and gives it to the pair. They put on the rings and switch back their original bodies . Alvy fights the villains while Vikki calls the police, who arrive and arrest them. In the post credits scene, the 2 robbers who stole the rings from the museum steal them again, but this time they try them on and swap bodies with each other.

== Cast ==
- Shine Tom Chacko as Alvy Benedict / Janaki (after body swapping)
- Anusree as Janaki / Alvy Benedict (after body swapping)
- Sathya as Deva Bhai
- Balu Varghese as Vikki
- Swapna Menon as Shreya
- Divya Prabha as Ann
- Sunil Sukhada as K. Sebastian
- Ambika Mohan as Sulochana
- Valsala Menon as Janaki's grandmother
- Bindhu Aneesh as Dr. Deepa Pradeep
- Orma Bose as Mayor's Daughter
- Joy Mathew as the Dr. Samuel
- Noby Marcose as Suresh
- RJ Mathukutty as Radio FM Anchor
- Pradeep Kottayam as Aaloor Ettan
- Binu Adimali as Rarichan
- Arun Vishwam as Police Constable
- Pavithran as Jewellery Shop Owner
- Arunsol as vikki friend
- Manoj Varghese Parecattil as salesman

== Production ==
The film marked the directorial debut of Binu S. Kalady, a wedding photographer who also has a couple of ad films to his credit. Most of the crew members also did not have any experience in cinema. Binu says, "All we had was optimism. We were a bunch of photographers whose only association with cinema was as an audience. But, I had unbridled passion for movies and that's how I decided to do a movie. I spent almost a year on another project, but couldn't get a producer. Then my friends suggested I come up with a more cost-effective project so that we could pump in the money ourselves. That's when I zeroed in on Ithihasa."

The film centers on body swapping, a theme that has been explored earlier in many films. The director says: "This thread has been explored earlier in Hollywood, as in It’s a Boy Girl Thing. Another film featuring a story on body swapping was Freaky Friday. We used this thread to develop into a story suited for the Indian audience." According to some reviewers, the film is loosely based on the 2002 Hollywood film The Hot Chick.

Binu said in an interview that actors and actresses whom he initially approached rejected the script saying the story was too unbelievable. Later he signed Shine Tom Chacko and Anusree as the lead pair. Binu had interacted with Shine Tom Chacko earlier and was confident he could do the lead character. But even the crew themselves were apprehensive about his choice of actress, Anusree. However, Binu was convinced "though she herself wasn't". For Shine Tom Chacko, who has worked in 15 films, Ithihasa was the first in a lead role. He says: "The director had approached me for a short film, but the project did not take off due to some reason. He had narrated the thread of Ithihasa then. There is a Hollywood film, The Hot Chick, with a similar storyline; Binu was confident about the subject and so I agreed to do it." Recalling the efforts that went into be the character, Shine said in an interview that playing a woman was quite challenging but being a keen observer of women from childhood helped him to become the character effortlessly. The film was made with a minimal budget of ₹2.5 crore (US$260,000).

== Music ==
All lyrics written by B. K. Harinarayanan, all music composed by Deepak Dev. Music released on East Coast. The soundtrack received positive reviews. The Times of India wrote: "Blending melody and peppiness with smooth lyrics, composer Deepak Dev and lyricist Harinarayanan dish out a standard album and it makes for a pleasant listen. Itihasa has three songs, which are catchy and hummable."

Song	Singer(s)
"Kannimalare Kanninazhake"	Najim Arshad, Gayathri Suresh
"Ambada Njaane Chellada Mone"	Deepak Dev, Lonely Doggy, Sannidanandan
"Jeevitham Maayapambaram"	Ronny Philip, Lonely Doggy

== Reception ==
=== Critical response ===
Ithihasa received highly positive reviews and well critical acclaim from critics and audiences. The Hindu wrote: "this small film entertain in parts and is a better watch than the ones coming branded as ‘comedy’." The Times of India rated the film 4/5 and said, "the director has done a decent job and the film, with all its absurdity, makes for a cute, light-hearted entertainer." Rediff.com gave 3.5/5 rating and said, "The storyline sounds simple and thin but the way it is presented makes Ithihasa worth watching." Sify.com gave the verdict as "watchable" and said, "Ithihasa is far from perfect but this one is a genuine attempt from a bunch of newcomers." Nowrunning.com rated the film 3/5 and wrote: "'Ithihasa' is simple but best humorous tale with the infusion of a bit of fantasy."

=== Box office ===
The film turned out to be a sleeper hit, and was lauded as one of the best comedy films in the recent times. The DVD of the film was released on the first week of December. It collected ₹4.35 crore (US$450,000) in 52 days of its release, turning out to be one of the highest-grossing films in Malayalam in 2014.

== See also ==
- Body swap
- Body swap appearances in media
- Mind uploading in fiction
