= Prakash Velayudhan =

Indian Cinematographer

- Website: http://prakashvelayudhan.com

Prakash Velayudhan is a cinematographer from Kerala, predominantly working in Malayalam films.

== Filmography ==
Year	Language		Title		Credit
2002	Malayalam	Feature Film	Neythukaran		Associate Cameraman
2003	Malayalam	Feature Film	Anyar		Associate Cameraman
2006	Malayalam	Feature Film	Parayam		Associate Cameraman
2006	Malayalam	Feature Film	Vadakkum Nathan		Camera Assistant
2007	Malayalam	Feature Film	Vinodayathra		Camera Assistant
2008	Malayalam	Feature Film	Calcutta News		Camera Assistant
2009	Hindi	Feature Film	S.R.K		Camera Assistant
2009	Malayalam	Feature Film	Seetha Kalyanam		Camera Assistant
2009		Documentary	Pranathi	Keli Ramachandran	Camera Operator
2009		Documentary	Tiger Men	Lisa Gunning	Camera Operator
2011	Hindi	Feature Film	Mujhse Fraaandship Karoge		Associate cameraman
2016	Hindi	Feature Film	Shivaay		Camera Operator
2016	Malayalam	Shortfilm	Opportunity	Jazeer Thekkekara	Cinematographer
2016	Malayalam	Shortfilm	Sir, Laddoo	Siddique	Cinematographer
2016	Malayalam	Shortfilm	Breath Here	Jazeer Thekkekara	Cinematographer
2016	Malayalam	Shortfilm	7 Years Away	Shaji T.U	Cinematographer
2016	Malayalam	Shortfilm	Feel Me	Jaswin Jose	Cinematographer
2017	Malayalam	Feature Film	Oru Mexican Aparatha		Director of Photography
2017	Telugu	Feature Film	Lava Kusha		Director of Photography
2019	Malayalam	Feature Film	Mask (2019 film)		Director of Photography
2019	Malayalam	Feature Film	Nuvvu Thoppu Raa		Director of Photography
2019	Malayalam	Feature Film	The Gambler		Director of Photography
2020	Malayalam	Feature Film	Ulta		Director of Photography
2020	Malayalam	Feature Film	Aaravam		Director of Photography
