= Raj Kalesh =

- Occupations: Magician; chef; stage choreographer

Raj Kalesh is an Indian magician, chef, TV host, stage choreographer and performer hailing from Trivandrum, Kerala. He has been the host of various shows for national channels, but almost all channels in Malayalam. He has also appeared in films, with notable roles in movies such as Sapthamashree Thaskaraha, Ustad Hotel and Lord Livingstone 7000 Kandi. He is also known for Udan Panam.

== Television ==
List of television credits
Year	Title	Role	Channel	Notes
2016–2017	De Ruchi	Host	Mazhavil Manorama	Cookery show
