= Roopesh Peethambaran =

Indian film director and actor

- Occupations: Actor; writer; film director
- Years active: 1995–present

Roopesh Peethambaran is an Indian film director and actor working in Malayalam cinema. As an actor, he first appeared as a child artist in the 1995 film Spadikam (as Thomas Chacko). In 2012, he made his directorial debut through Theevram.

== Film career ==
Roopesh Peethambaran started his film career in 1995 as a child artist in Spadikam. He played the childhood role of Thomas Chacko which was portrayed by Mohanlal. He also acted as child artist in the 1996 television series Pranavam aired on Doordarshan Malayalam. As an adult, Roopesh worked as an IT professional in Dell, Bangalore, before quitting to pursue his love for film. He made his directorial debut with the Malayalam film Theevram in 2012.

== Filmography as director ==
Year	Title	Notes	Ref.
2012	Theevram	Starring Dulquar Salman; Also scriptwriter	
2015	You Too Brutus	Starring Asif Ali, Tovino Thomas; Also scriptwriter	

== Filmography as actor ==
=== TV serials ===
Year	Title	Role	Notes	Ref.
1996	Pranavam	Unknown	Television Series, Child Artist	

=== Feature films ===
Year	Title	Role	Notes	Ref.
1995	Spadikam	Thomas Chacko	Childhood role of Mohanlal	
2017	Oru Mexican Aparatha	Roopesh	Role of KSQ Leader opposite to Tovino Thomas	
2018	Angarajyathe Jimmanmar	Kichu		
2019	Gambler	Satheesh Chandra	Cameo	
2021	Kunjeldho		Cameo	
2025	Valsala Club			
2026	Bhaskarabharanam †	TBA		

=== Short films ===
Year	Title	Role	Notes	Ref.
2017	Touch	Dr. George	Lead role	
