= Binu Sadanandan =

Indian film director and screenwriter

- Born: 1 June 1980 (age 46); Kalady, Edavoor, Ernakulam, Kerala
- Education: Sree Sankara College; Kalady, Ernakulam
- Occupations: Film director, screenwriter
- Years active: 2014–present

Binu Sadanandan (born 23 July) is an Indian film director and screenwriter who works in Malayalam films.

Binu gained popularity with his directional debut film Ithihasa in 2014, which became a sleeper hit, and later he went on to direct his second film Style (2016), which also gained cult status.

== Career ==
Binu Sadanandan started as a Photographer. Meanwhile, Binu developed the one-line plot of Ithihasa., which became his debut directorial. Ithihasa was released in 2014. The film received well critical acclaim and fared well at the box-office.

His next film, Style, came in 2016. The film mainly received negative reviews, but was a success at the box-office. Although it took close to two years in the making, Style marked a turning point in his career as director. Binu stated: "Style is not Ithihasa. Ithihasa stemmed from the desire to do a totally different film. Style on the other hand is a normal film. An object gaining prominence in each movie happened unintentionally. It is the byproduct of writing scripts with an eye on novelty. Therefore, there isn't any story behind the objects."

== Personal life ==
Binu was born to K.Sadanandan and Radhamani. He spent his childhood in Kalady in Ernakulam. He graduated with a bachelor's in Hindi from Sree Sankara College, Kalady.

== Filmography ==
Year	Film	Credited as			Notes
Year	Film	Director	Script	Story	Notes
2014	Ithihasa	Yes	No	No	
2016	Style	Yes	No	No	
2018	Kamuki	Yes	Yes	Yes	
