= Shebin Benson =

Indian actor

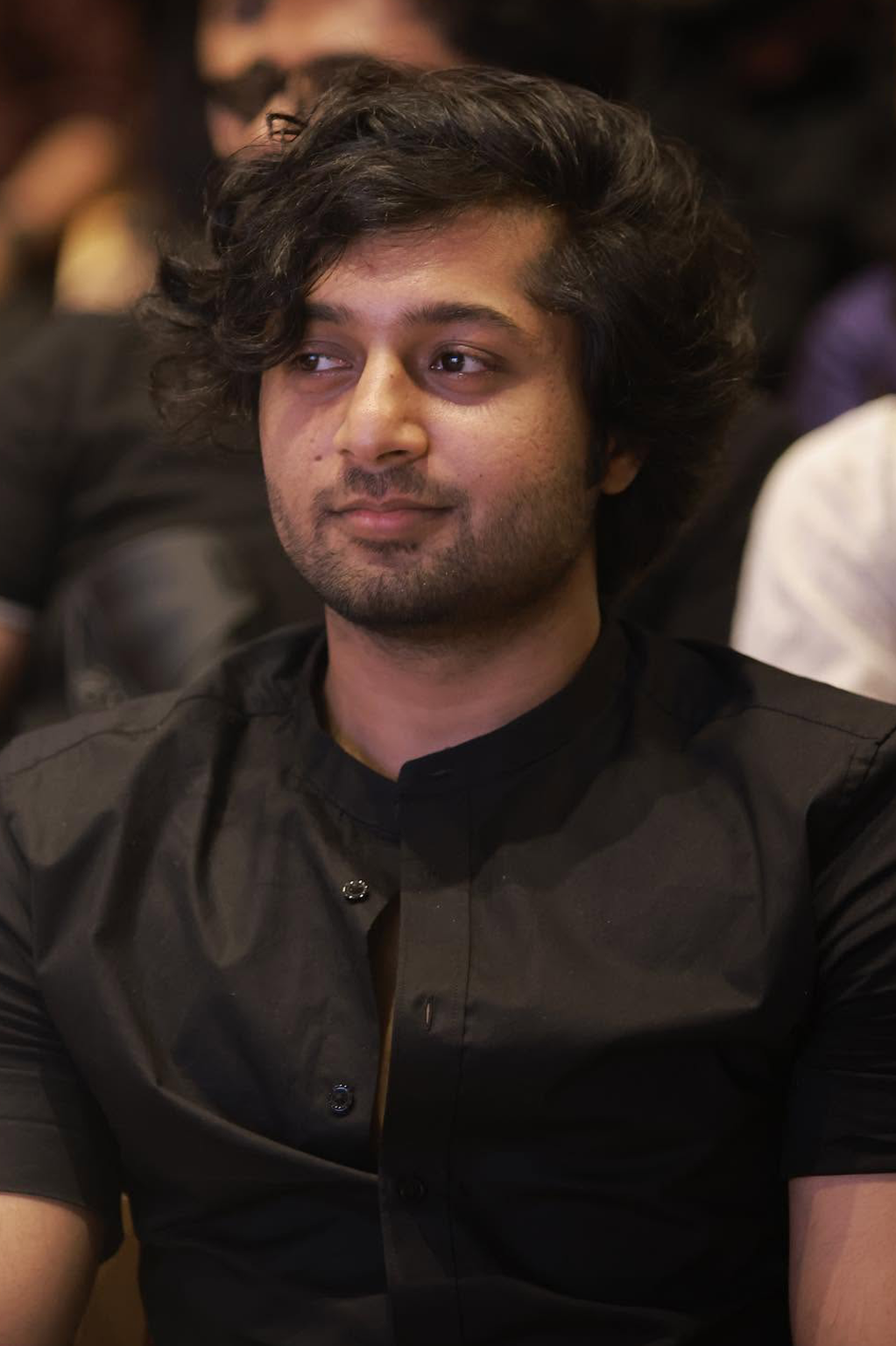
- Shebin Benson at the success celebration of Kannur Squad in 2024
- Born: 27 November 1995 (age 30); Nilambur, Kerala, India
- Education: B.Sc. in Visual Communication, SRM Institute of Science and Technology
- Occupation: Actor
- Years active: 2013–present
- Parents: Chandy Benson; Mariamma Benson
- Relatives: Nebish Benson (brother)

Shebin Benson (born 27 November 1995) is an Indian actor who works predominantly in Malayalam films.

Shebin made his debut in Aashiq Abu film Idukki Gold in 2013, Later, he appeared in Mammootty starrer Varsham. His first film as a male lead was in Kaly alongside many youngsters.

== Early life ==
Benson was born into a family in Nilambur as the elder son of Chandy Benson and Sherly Benson. He has a younger brother, Nebish Benson who is also an actor in the Malayalam cinema. Shebin completed his secondary level education at Fatimagiri High School, Nilambur and Marthoma Higher Secondary School, Nilambur. He is a graduate in B.Sc. Visual Communication from The SRM Institute of Science and Technology, Chennai, Tamil Nadu.

== Career ==
Shebin applied for the audition of Idukki Gold and was included in the 25 shortlisted actors and got his debut role to play the younger version of Maniyanpilla Raju. Shebin appeared as Ameer alongside Mammootty, Mamta Mohandas and Asha Sarath in the Ranjith Sankar movie Varsham which gained him better recognition among the Malayali audience. Shebin played the role of teenage Fahadh Faasil in Amal Neerad's Iyobinte Pusthakam along with his brother Nebish Benson which released on 7 November 2014. Later in Santhosh Viswanath's Chirakodinja Kinavukal, Shebin portrayed the childhood of Thayyalkaran played by Kunchacko Boban. He appeared in a music video "Maya" from the band album Blank Planet in 2015. He played the younger Dawood in Inspector Dawood Ibrahim directed by Sajid Yahiya in which Jayasurya played the lead. Shebin played a lead role in Don Max's debut directorial movie 10 Kalpanakal. Shebin was later seen with Asif Ali in Kaattu. He debuted as a male lead in Kaly along with a group of young actors. Thereafter he was seen as one of the lead actors in Mr. & Ms. Rowdy directed by Jeethu Joseph along with Kalidas Jayaram and Aparna Balamurali and in Paviyettante Madhurachooral along with Sreenivasan and Lena. His debut as an individual hero was in Onnonnara pranayakadha which was directed by Shibu Balan and had Zaya David, Indy Palissery, Vinay Forrt, Sudheer Karamana, Surabhi Lakshmi in lead roles. He also played a key role in Aashiq Abu directed multistarred movie Virus. His role as "Yahiya" in the movie was widely appreciated. His character as Leen Zacaria in his latest release Evidey directed by KK Rajeev gained him wider recognition among Malayalam audiences and received wide appreciation. He played one of the lead roles along with Manoj K Jayan and Asha Sharath.

== Filmography ==
Year	Title	Role	Notes
2013	Idukki Gold	Younger Madhan	
2014	Iyobinte Pusthakam	Younger Aloshy	
2014	Varsham	Ameer	
2015	Chirakodinja Kinavukal	Younger Thayyalkaran	
2016	Inspector Dawood Ibrahim	Younger Dawood	
2016	10 Kalpanakal	John	
2017	Kaattu	Afsal	
2018	Kaly	Sameer	
2018	Mohanlal	Younger Sethu Madhavan	
2018	Paviyettante Madhurachooral	Anandu	
2019	Mr. & Ms. Rowdy	Pathrose	
2019	Oronnonnara PranayaKadha	Ramanan	
2019	Virus	Yahiya	
2019	Evidey	Leen Zachariah	
2019	Janamaithri	Abhimanyu	Cameo appearance
2022	Sumesh and Ramesh		Cameo appearance
2022	Bheeshma Parvam	Able	
2022	2 Stroke		
2023	Iratta	Bobby	
2023	Ntikkakkakkoru Premondarnn	Jemshad	
2023	Sulaikha Manzil	Ashik Maaliyekkal	Cameo appearance
2023	Pookkaalam	K.C.Unnikrishnan	Cameo appearance
2023	2018	Nahas	
2023	Charles Enterprises		
2023	Kolla	Basil	
2023	Kannur Squad	Ramzan Wahab	
2024	Manjummel Boys	Mejo	Cameo appearance
2024	Ullozhukku	Juman	Cameo appearance
2024	Big Ben	Ajin	
2024	Kishkindha Kaandam	Prasobh	
2025	Thalavara	Praveen	
2026	Anomie	Ziyaan Philip	
2026	Aadu 3	Baba's accomplice (future)	
2026	Anchaam Pramaanam †	TBA	Filming
2026	Disco	TBA	Filming

== Dubbing ==
Year	Title	Dubbed for	Character	Language	Notes
2025	Thudarum	Thomas Mathew	Pavi Shanmugham	Malayalam	
