= Najeem Koya =

Indian film director

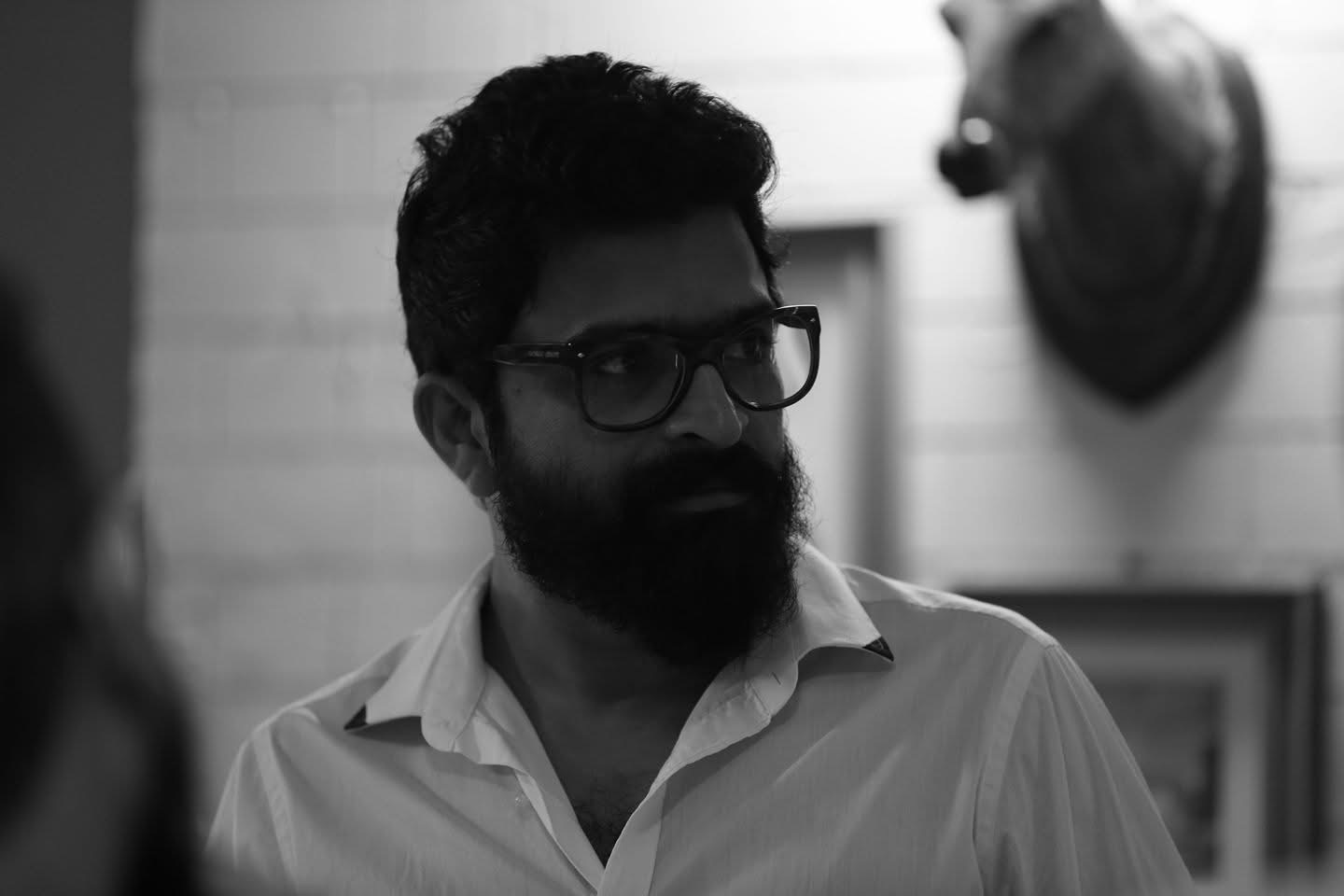
- Born: 5 May 1980 (age 46); Alappuzha, Kerala, India
- Occupations: director; Writer
- Years active: 2010–present

Najeem Koya (born 5 May 1980) is an Indian film director, screenwriter, and actor who works in Malayalam cinema. He made his directorial debut in 2018 with the film Kaly. He directed a series called 1000 Babies, released on Disney+ Hotstar in 2024.

== Filmography ==
Key
†	Denotes films that have not yet been released

List of film credits
Year	Title	Director	Screenwriter	Actor	Notes	Ref.
2010	Apoorvaragam	No	Yes	No	Directed Sibi Malayil	
2012	Friday	No	Yes	No	Directed Lijin Jose	
2013	Match Box	No	No	Yes	Short film by Karthik	
2015	Two Countries	No	Yes	No	Directed Shafi (director)	
2017	Sherlock Toms	No	Yes	No	Directed Shafi (director)	
2018	Kaly	Yes	Yes	No	Debut film	
2024	1000 Babies	Yes	Yes	No	Web series Streaming in Disney+ Hotstar	
