= Half (film) =

2026 Indian film

- Directed by: Samjad
- Written by: Praveen Viswanath; Samjad
- Produced by: Anne Sajeev; Sajeev P. K.
- Starring: Ranjith Sajeev; Aishwarya Raj; Abbas; Amala Paul; Srikanth Murali
- Cinematography: Pappinu
- Edited by: Mahesh Bhuvanend
- Music by: Midhun Mukundan
- Production company: Fragrant Nature Film Creations
- Distributed by: Fragrant Nature Film Creations; AA Films
- Running time: 108 mins
- Country: India
- Language: Malayalam

Half is an upcoming Indian Malayalam-language action thriller film directed by Samjad and written by Samjad and Praveen Viswanath. The film stars Ranjith Sajeev, Aiswarya Raj, Amala Paul and Abbas.

== Plot ==
Two half-blooded vampires embark on a violent hunt, racing through high-speed chases as they pursue a revenge plot rooted in vampire lore.

== Cast ==
- Ranjith Sajeev as Ethan
- Aishwarya Raj as Ivy
- Abbas as Selli
- Amala Paul as Sophia, the twins' mother
- Srikant Murali as Simon

== Production ==
Half was directed by Samjad, who previously directed the 2024 Malayalam film Golam. The screenplay was written by Samjad and Praveen Viswanath. The film was produced by Anne Sajeev and Sajeev P. K. under Fragrant Nature Film Creations.

The film's technical team includes action choreographer Very Tri Ulisman, National Award-winning editor Mahesh Bhuvanend, National Award-winning production designer Mohandas, cinematographer Pappinu, music director Midhun Mukundan, and National Award-winning sound designer Vishnu Govind.

Half was shot over 117 days in various locations, including the hill stations of Kerala, deserts of Rajasthan, and the snowy terrains of Kazakhstan.

== Distribution ==
Excel Entertainment acquired the North Indian distribution rights of the film in Hindi in association with AA Films. This is Excel Entertainment's first collaboration with the Malayalam film industry. Best Friends Forever (BFF) has acquired the international marketing rights for the film.

== Release ==
Half had its world premiere in the Midnight Madness section of the 51st edition of the Toronto International Film Festival in September 2026. Half is being planned to release in Malayalam, Tamil, Telugu, Hindi and Kannada languages.

== Reception ==
The film received coverage following its premiere at the Toronto International Film Festival.
