= Surjith Gopinath =

Indian actor

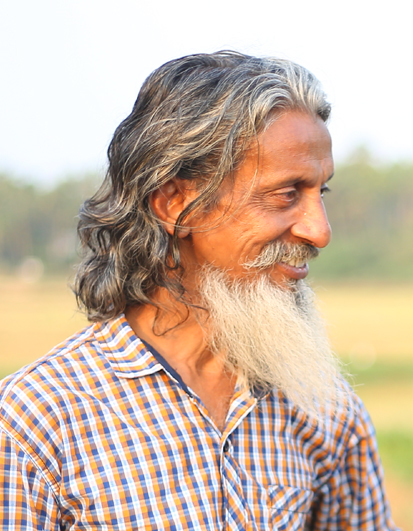
- Surjith in 2018
- Born: 24 August 1964 (age 62); Alapad Thrissur
- Years active: 2008
- Notable work: Charlie,Biriyaani, Churuli

Surjith Gopinath is an Indian actor in Malayalam films known for his role in the movie Charlie (2015).

== Personal life ==
Surjith was born to Alapad, Thrissur. He completed drama studies in School of Drama & Fine Arts at Thrissur and Pondicherry University. He started as a theater artist and directed some theater drama. He has acted in about 30 films and few Shortfilm. Surjith is married to Diya Darmapalan and has two children, Uthara and Mayan

== Filmography ==
Year	Title	Role	Notes
2008	Laptop		
2013	Neelakasham Pachakadal Chuvanna Bhoomi	Raghavan	
2014	Iyobinte Pusthakam	Laser	
2015	Utopiayile Rajavu		
2015	Charlie	Aadu Abutty	
2016	Paavada	Drunkard	
2016	Oru Muthassi Gadha	Gypsy singer	
2017	Aby	Crispy	
2017	Punyalan Private Limited	Lottery seller	
2018	Kamuki	Handicapped man	
2018	Iblis	Puppetry artist	
2018	Ladoo	Angeline's uncle	
2019	Evidey	Band member	
2019	Maarconi Mathaai	Homeless man	
2019	Porinju Mariam Jose	Bolshevik Payli	
2019	Biriyaani	Mohammed Bijili	
2020	Vrithakrithiyulla Chathuram	Ramachandran	
2021	Maara	Muzzafir	Tamil film
2021	Churuli	Shooter	
2021	Tsunami	Lonappan	
2021	The Last Two Days		
2021	Minnal Murali	Paachan	
2021	Oru Thathvika Avalokanam	Nexal Shankaran	
2022	Pullu Risng	Kallan	
2022	Thattassery Koottam	Blind landlord	
2022	Aanandam Paramanandam		
2022	Purusha Pretham		
2023	Picasso		
2024	Porul	Divakaran	TV mini series
2024	Qalb	Freddy Uncle	
2024	Panchavalsara Padhathi	Gokulan	
2026	Thalaivar Thambi Thalaimaiyil	Nanji	Tamil film
2026	Karakkam	Drunkard	
2026	Toxic	Drunken car driver	Kannada-English bilingual film

=== Short films ===
Year	Title	Role	Notes
2009	Kelkkunnundo		Directed by Geethu Mohandas
2019	Raghavan	Raghavan	Directed by Rahul R. Sarma; Screened at the International Documentary Short Film Festival Kerala on 2019.
2019	Iravadhigaaram	Karthik	Tamil film
2019	Cheelu Vasu	Cheelu Vasu	
2019	Fish Molly	Surjith	
2021	Trigonometry	Bhadran	
2021	Vishudha Arappiyude Onnam Athbhutha Pravarthi	Kunjappan	
