= Kudumbasree Travels =

Malayalam movie

- Directed by: Kiran
- Written by: Thomas Thoppikodi
- Produced by: Anil Mathew
- Starring: Jayaram; Bhavana
- Music by: Bijibal
- Production company: Mythri Visuals
- Distributed by: Central Pictures Release
- Release date: 21 January 2011
- Country: India
- Language: Malayalam

Kudumbasree Travels is a 2011 Malayalam comedy film directed by Kiran starring Jayaram and Bhavana in the lead roles. It is about Aravindan, a bus service owner who makes a several attempts to marry Aswathy, a Chakyarkoothu dancer in an arranged marriage. Kudumbasree Travels marks the directorial debut of Kiran. Thomas Thoppikodi is the writer. The film started its shooting in September 2010 and major parts were filmed from Ottappalam. It released on 21 January 2011 in 54 centres. It received mostly negative reviews and was a commercial flop.

== Plot ==
In the village of Chitirapuram resides Aravindan Chakyar aka Aravi, who is an exponent of Chakyarkoothu (A traditional Kerala dance form). Aravi's parents want him to get married. Aravi has no objections but one condition that the girl must also be an exponent of Chakyarkoothu. Chachu is Aravi's uncle. As per a tradition in Kerala, Chachu wants Aravi to marry his daughter, so that he can have a part of the wealth of Aravi's family. He thus tries to impress Aravi and his parents, who see through him and avoid him. George Kutty, a marriage broker and Aravi's friend, brings a relation according to Aravi's demand. Aswathy is a dancer, and an exponent of Chakyarkoothu and lives in the city. She belongs to a rich family, that follow some traditions. Aravi meets her and their marriage is fixed, much to the dismay of Chachu.

Aravi and an ensemble, consisting of villagers, depart for the city in a bus named Kudumbasree Travels. Chachu joins them in order to stop the marriage. Along with him is Nettar, an astrologer, who is promised a sum for help. At the same time, a girl named Sridevi is going to Kochi on a mission. Her father DIG Rajashekar, has been kidnapped by some men. They want Sridevi to bring a suitcase to the city. While waiting for a bus, some people who are waiting for Kudumbasree Travels to go to Aravi's marriage, mistake her for another girl Hemalatha. Sridevi decides to pose as Hemalatha and go to Kochi with the marriage group.

At Kochi, Suman, Ashwathy's cousin, returns with an intention to marry Aswathy, but is shocked to learn that Aswathy's marriage has been fixed with someone else. He decides to conspire with his friend and caretaker Adiyodi to wreck the marriage, while maintaining a supportive mentality. On the wedding day, the groom and team arrive late. In Kerala tradition, a marriage should be done within a Muhurtham or auspicious time. Aswathy's family believe that a marriage after the Muhurtham is bad luck. Aravi, due to interference from Chachu and Suman, is unable to marry Aswathy. An astrologer gives them another Muhurtham the next day. But it is only a minute long. Aravi and his team make all preparations to get on time. This time, Suman injects a drug into Aravi and the marriage is once again ruined after he falls unconscious. Aravi and his parents question Chachu, who denies any action.

Nettar sees that there is money in Hemalatha's bag and attempts to steal it by using an identical bag. During his escapade to get the money, he causes Aravi to fall on Sridevi. A picture of this is taken by a hotel caretaker. Nettar and Chachu decide to use the photo to convince both parties that Aravi has an affair with Sridevi/ Hemalatha. The photo causes an outrage between both parties and the wedding is called off. Aswathy, who trusts Aravi, decides to elope with Aravi. At the same day, Sridevi also leaves. When both Aravi and Sridevi are found missing, they are presumed to have eloped. That is when the truth about Hemalatha is also learned.

Aswathy is convinced by Suman and Adiyodi that they will help her. But they reveal their plan to get Aswathy married to Suman. Aswathy escapes and meets up with Aravi. In an ensuing comical fight with Suman and his men, they rescue Sridevi's father from the kidnappers. They then join with Aravi's ensemble. Nettar followed Sridevi to get her bag and grabs it. When he reunites with everyone, everyone goes after the money. Aravi, frustrated, grabs the bag and throws it away. It is revealed to be a bomb and explodes. Nettar, at the sight of this, goes insane. Sridevi and her father thank Aravi for saving everyone and leave.

Aravi them takes his team in search of a temple to marry Aswathy. When no temple is found, Aravi and Aswathy decide to get married in front of some idols which are for sale. Aswathy's family also arrive and reveal that they know about Chachu and Suman attempting to sabotage the wedding. With the consent of everyone, Aravi and Aswathy get married. The film ends as the newlywed couple of Aravi and Aswathy depart for Aravi's village with everyone aboard Kudumbasree Travels.

== Cast ==
- Jayaram as Aravindan Chakyar (Aravi)
- Bhavana as Aswathy
- Radhika as Sreedevi, Rajashekhar's daughter
- Jagathy Sreekumar as Kunjambu, Aravindan's uncle
- P. Sreekumar as Chembakassery Govindan Chakyar, Aravindan's father
- Kalabhavan Shajohn as Suman, Aswathy's cousin
- Kottayam Nazeer as George Kutty, Aravindan's friend
- Maniyanpilla Raju as Nettar, the astrologist
- Mamukkoya as Makkar Kakka
- Narayanankutty as Kanaran
- Mohanan Ayooor as DIG Rajashekharan Nair IPS
- K. P. A. C. Lalitha as Bhavani, Aravindan's mother
- Kalpana as Khadeeja
- Janardhanan as Mullasery Raveendra Chakyar, Aswathy's father
- Vettukili Prakash as Sathyan, Aravindan's friend
- Sidhartha Shiva as Rajappan, the bus driver
- Kulappulli Leela as Lathika
- Deepika Mohan
