= Inspector Dawood Ibrahim =

- Theatrical-release poster
- Directed by: Sajid Yahiya
- Written by: Arouz Irfaan; Sajid Yahiya
- Produced by: Dr.Ajaz Ibrahim; Arun
- Starring: Jayasurya; Sshivada; Yog Japee; Joju George; Saiju Kurup
- Cinematography: Sujith Sarang
- Edited by: Shameer Muhammed
- Music by: Rahul Raj
- Production company: Magic Lantern Productions
- Distributed by: Eros International
- Release date: 12 August 2016
- Country: India
- Language: Malayalam

Inspector Dawood Ibrahim, also known as IDI, is a 2016 Indian Malayalam-language action comedy film directed by Sajid Yahiya (in his directorial debut) who co-wrote the film with Arouz Irfan. It stars Jayasurya in the lead role with Sshivada, Yog Japee, Joju George and Sunil Sukhada playing supporting roles. The soundtrack and background score are composed by Rahul Raj. Sujith Sarang handles the cinematography, with editing by Shameer Muhammed.

IDI narrates the story of a rich man who has dreamt of being a police officer all his life and eventually works hard to become one. It was released in India on 12 August 2016. The film also had a Hindi dubbed release titled Fauladi Policewala. The plot is inspired by the 2007 Hollywood film "Hot Fuzz".

== Plot ==
The story is about Dawood Ibrahim, a man from a wealthy family, who chooses to become an honest police officer to give back to his community. He is transferred to a poor town Kollanahalli, at the Kerala-Karnataka border as the inspector of the local police station. He finds the village to be remote and without any major crimes. Soon, he meets Appendix Pappy, who swallows every gold or valuables he steals and Vasu, Karthavu and Kaimal, who are local thieves. Dawood hatches a plan to get a transfer to another police station by telling the trio to steal money from the local bank and rendezvous with him at a secluded place. Meanwhile, an armed robbery occurs at a bank in Mangalore led by Mr. X who manage to steal money, gold, and other valuable objects, including a priceless ruby belonging to the underworld don Akbar Ali. They plan to escape to Kollanahalli. Vasu's gang manages to steal the money, as ordered by Dawood, but they betray him and take the money for themselves, thinking that Dawood is trying to look good in the land. But Vasu and his gang accidentally crash into Mr. X's gang. As they try to help the latter, they discover the loot in Mr. X's van, and they take the stash and the men.

Dawood, with the help of Appendix Pappi, manages to track and nab all 6 members of the gang and discovers Akbar Ali's involvement. After settling the issue of Vasu's robbery through a compromise, Dawood instigates Akbar to come for him. Akbar then kidnaps Dawood's father, his comrades at the police station and Mr. X's gang. Akbar asks for his ruby to be delivered in return for sparing their lives. Dawood and Vasu's gang deliver the box, but it is found to be empty. Vasu and his gang help Dawood out, and finally, Dawood kills Akbar.

Dawood confesses that the ruby is lost and its whereabouts are unknown. It's revealed that the ruby was swallowed by Appendix Pappi. On being asked whether he knows where his next posting is, Dawood imagines being posted in Pakistan facing Dawood Ibrahim, the underworld don.

== Cast ==
- Jayasurya as Circle Inspector Dawood Ibrahim
  - Shebin Benson as Teenager Dawood
    - Nebish Benson as Younger Dawood
- Sshivada as Nithya Niranjan
- Saiju Kurup as Mr. X
- Joju George as Vasu /and Vasco (in a dream)
- Yog Japee as Don Akbar Ali
- Vijayakumar as Commissioner Alex Idikula IPS
- Sunil Sukhada as Head Constable Kuttan Pillai
- Madhupal as Ambanattil Rahim Haji, Dawood's father
- Vanitha Krishnachandran as Dawood's mother
- Tony Joseph as Don Khalid
- Baiju Ezhupunna as Thomas, Bank Manager
- Molly Kannamaly as Head Constable Angel Mary
- Hinal Bambhania (Haelyn Shastri) as Sub Inspector Zereena Rowther
- Balaji Sarma
- Gokulan as Karthavu/and yeshu (in a dream)
- Sudhi Koppa as Kaimal aka Kai
- KS Thameem
- Sajan Palluruthy as Varathan Varkey
- Dominic Dom as ' Appendix ' Pappi
- Vaisakh Velayudhan as Bihari Babu
- Rizwan M Shiras

== Production ==
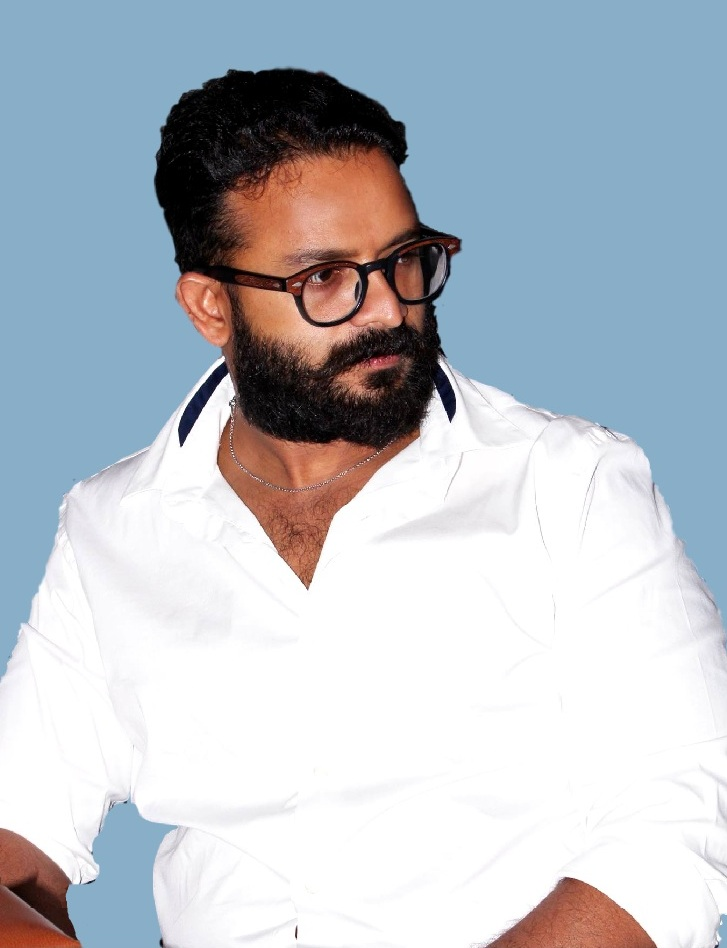
Asif Ali was initially selected to play the lead but he was replaced by Jayasurya.

=== Development ===
In early January 2015, actor Sajid Yahiya announced his debut as a director. Asif Ali, who was cast in the lead, announced that he will produce the film under his production banner Adam's World of Imagination, but when he left the project, Ajaz Ibrahim and Arun signed to produce the film under Magic Lantern Productions. Filming scheduled to start in March 2015.

=== Casting and crew ===
Sajid kept the lead role of the film in secret. Only hinting that a young actor from the industry will be the lead. In June 2015 the crew announced Asif Ali in the lead, but in March 2016 reports said that Asif Ali will be replaced, afterwards reports confirmed that Jayasurya is the new lead playing Dawood Ibrahim. In March 2016 Sshivada signed to play the female lead. Her role is Nita a bank employee. She also had a significant role in the whole stunts of the film. The film marks the second collaboration of Jayasurya and Sshivada after Su..Su...Sudhi Vathmeekam (2015). Sajid chose Sooraj Harris to play a minor role, he described it as a "stylish role", he was inappropriate for a Malayali look and was dismissed from some films due to his North Indian look but according to him his role in IDI is very perfect and suitable for him. Unni P. Rajan who mostly act in comedy roles signed to do a throughout antagonist role, he assumes the role of a robber in it. Joju George and Sunil Sukhada were signed to play vital roles.

Sajid chose Rahul Raj and Praveen Varma as the film's music composer and costume designer. Stunts for the film was choreographed by Action G who attended with Peter Hein., while Shameer Muhammed was designated for film editing.

== Release and reception ==
IDI was released on 12 August 2016 and the film crossed ₹ 2 crore within three days in Kerala.

== Music ==
The film score and soundtrack were composed, arranged and produced by Rahul Raj. The soundtrack was released by Eros Music.

=== Track listing ===
==== Malayalam version (Original) ====
No.	Title	Performer(s)	Length
1.	"Jagada Jagada"	Rahul Raj, Sajid Yahiya
2.	"Sheythaante Cheytha"	Pradeep Palluruthy, Vaikom Vijayalakshmi
3.	"IDI Theme"	Rahul Raj, Josely Lonely Doggy
4.	"Ee Khalbitha"	Suchith Suresan

==== Hindi version (Dubbed) ====
No.	Title	Performer(s)	Length
1.	"Jagada"	Rahul Raj, Sajid Yahiya
2.	"IDI Theme"	Rahul Raj, Josely Lonely Doggy
3.	"Ishq Hai"
