= Lilli (2018 film) =

Lilly
- Film poster
- Directed by: Prasobh Vijayan
- Screenplay by: Prasobh Vijayan
- Produced by: Mukesh R. Mehta; C. V. Sarathi
- Starring: Samyuktha; Aaryan Krishna Menon; Kannan Nayar; Dhanesh Anand; Sajin Cherukayil; Kevin jose
- Cinematography: Sreeraj Raveendran
- Edited by: Appu Bhattathiri
- Music by: Sushin Shyam
- Production company: E4 Experiments
- Distributed by: E4 Entertainment
- Release date: 28 September 2018
- Running time: 91 minutes
- Country: India
- Language: Malayalam

Lilli is a 2018 Indian Malayalam-language revenge thriller film written and directed by Prasobh Vijayan. It was produced and distributed by E4 Entertainment. The film began production in early 2017. It won the Kerala State Film Awards for Best Female Dubbing Artist for Sneha.

== Plot ==
Lilli, a pregnant woman, who has a complicated backstory, gets a call that her husband has had an accident. While searching for her husband, she is hit by a car, taken to a secluded location and tortured by three men who hope she can provide information regarding a young girl who Lilli knows. However, Lilli pretends to not know anything about the girl.

Three days later, Lilli cracks and tells the men the location of the girl. Lilli kills two of the men when the other leaves to search for the girl. As she lies on the ground, flashbacks show Lilli's past, and that the girl was recruited to replace Lilli in a prostitution ring. Lilli had killed her dealer, stolen the money and rescued the girl. She sees her husband and realizes he had kidnapped her, wanting to know where the stolen money was hidden. Lilli kills her husband. Her name is linked to the murders, but as she has gone missing, the authorities cannot find her. As the credits roll, Lilli walks with her baby in one hand and a stick in the other.

== Cast ==
- Samyuktha as Lilli
- Aaryan Krishna Menon as Ajith
- Kannan Nayar as Sali
- Dhanesh Anand as Rajesh
- Sajin Cherukayil as Philip
- Kevin Jose as Anwar

== Music ==
The film score was composed by Sushin Shyam.

== Production ==
Lilli is the first movie produced by E4 experiments, a sister company of E4 Entertainment, and is distributed by E4 Entertainment. The film is edited by Appu Bhattathiri and cinematographed by Sreeraj Raveendran.

== Reception ==
The News Minute wrote "The actors rise to the occasion, each one delivering a sincere performance, but the flawed script lets them down".

According to Alix Turner of Ready Steady Cut, the film is "[w]ell made, and with a strong lead, though the writing and direction could do with a little polish, Lilli is a grittier and bloodier film than we're used to setting from India".
