= Crocodile Love Story =

- First Look Poster
- Directed by: Anoop Ramesh
- Written by: Sabari Sankar
- Starring: Praveen Prem; Avanthika Mohan
- Cinematography: Praveen Panicker
- Edited by: K. Sreenivas
- Music by: Arun Sidharrth
- Production company: Anurag Motion Pictures
- Distributed by: Anurag Motion Pictures
- Release date: 19 July 2013
- Country: India
- Language: Malayalam

Crocodile Love Story is a 2013 Indian Malayalam-language romantic comedy film directed by Anoop Ramesh. It features Praveen Prem and Avanthika Mohan in the lead roles. The music and background score is composed by Arun Sidharrth. The movie, which used the technique of Animatronics for the first time in Malayalam cinema, was released on 19 July 2013.

== Cast ==
- Praveen Prem as Kiran
- Avanthika Mohan as Nithya Namboothiri
- Kalabhavan Mani as S.I Suresh
- Prem Kumar as S.I.Vishwambharan
- Manikuttan as Sreeraj
- Ashokan as Narayanan Namboothiri
- R. K. Thayyil as Parameswaran
- Anand as DFO
- Dinesh Panicker as S.P. Anthony
- Maya Viswanath as Gayathri, Nithya's mother
- Vijayan Karanthoor as Sreeraj's uncle
- Praseetha Menon as Sreeraj's mother
- Santhosh Kurup as Sreeraj's father

== Production ==
The pooja of the film was held in Thiruvananthapuram on 2 January 2013, which was attended by many special guests such as director Shyamaprasad, director Shaji Kailas, producer Suresh Babu of Revathi Kalamandir, his wife and old Malayalam actress Menaka, Thiruvananthapuram Corporation mayor Adv. J. Chandrika and also by most of the cast and crew of the film. The first schedule which also included the shooting of one song started on 9 January 2013 at Thiruvananthapuram with Corporation Mayor Adv. J. Chandrika, mother of director Anoop Ramesh switching on the camera and completed in various places of Thiruvananthapuram within 24 days. The second schedule shooting was done at Malampuzha dams in Palakkad in March with a duration of around 18 days, mainly shooting the scenes of crocodile. The editing and dubbing works have been completed in Thiruvananthapuram and Chennai.

== Soundtrack ==
The music and background score for the movie is composed by Arun Sidharrth, while Sreeprasad C penned the lyrics. Audio and video of the song has been released on 5 July 2013.

Track listing
No.	Title	Singer(s)	Length
1.	"Aaro Aaro Ennariyathe"	Sreejith P. Pillai, Shweta Mohan	4:32

== Critical reception ==
Crocodile Love story getting mixed reviews from critics.

A critic from The Times of India rated the film two out of five and wrote that "The crocodile, a decent manifestation of technical effects, is a mere symbol of a triviality that could hurl a mob into panic. The cast accomplish their tasks with comfort and look more than credulous".
