= Tournament (film) =

2010 film directed by Lal

- Theatrical release poster
- Directed by: Lal
- Written by: Lal
- Produced by: Lal
- Starring: Manesh Kumar; Fahadh Faasil; Rupa Manjari; Praveen Prem
- Narrated by: Lal
- Cinematography: Venu; Amal Neerad
- Edited by: V. Sajan
- Music by: Deepak Dev; Alex Paul
- Production company: Lal Creations
- Distributed by: Lal Release
- Release date: 25 December 2010
- Country: India
- Language: Malayalam

Tournament is a 2010 Indian Malayalam-language road sports film written, directed and produced by Lal starring Manesh Kumar, Fahadh Faasil, Rupa Manjari and Praveen Prem. It started its shooting in August 2010 and was released on 25 December 2010. The film features songs by Deepak Dev and original score by Alex Paul. Cinematography was handled by Venu and Amal Neerad for a song.

Lal used a new format called play-replay, which is really the first in Malayalam film: One scene is replayed from different viewpoints after several scenes. Lal used this technique in the full length of the film.

== Plot ==
Viswanathan, Usman Ali and Balachandran are 3 friends who are cricket players. Their coach informs the three that they are selected for APL Cochin team's final selection tournament in Bangalore. Excited, they celebrate and meets Aswathy Alex, a freelance photographer. Right before the trip, Balachandran is injured while riding the bike and misses his trip to Bangalore. Unfortunately for Viswanathan and Usman, their flight gets cancelled due to a bomb threat. Aswathy then motivates them to take a road trip and have fun while travelling, telling them that it will relax them. Bobby also joins them in this trip. The rest of the trip they have a lot of adventure. Usman suffers from food poisoning while eating from a Dabba and is hospitalised. He also misses the tournament due to this. The scene cuts back to the incident where Balachandran was injured. Now it shows that it was Usman who pulled a thread in between the roads and caused the accident to Balachandran. They proceed with their journey. But Vishwanathan hurts his leg when the jeep losses its control. They decide to halt the journey for a while. In the meanwhile, both Aswathy and Bobby go to investigate John Subrahmaniyam. They meet a teashop owner who promises to help them investigate John. They enter John's house in the pretext of being his girlfriend's cousins. But John identifies them and warns them to stay away. But they engage in a fight and Bobby loses his consciousness. When he wakes up in the morning, he sees a dead Aswathy. But the tea shop owner rescues him. In the replay, we are shown that Aswathy is not dead. In another replay scene, it is shown that it was Bobby who opens the door causing Viswanathan to fall and break his leg. Tea shop owner asks Bobby to leave the place. Bobby drives away and it's revealed that the tea shop owner is actually John Subrahmaniyam and Aswathy is his sister, who planned her death so that John can be the player who is selected. But as they prepare to go, they are informed that the selection tournament has been cancelled. John, now regretting his actions and realizing that Aswathy has come to love Bobby, motivates her to tell him about her feelings. Soemtime later, the tournament restarts and everyone, including John, competes in it as a team, having reconciled. Viswanathan becomes Man of the tournament. In the end, Bobby marries Aswathy in the presence of Viswanathan, Usman, Balachandran and John.

== Cast ==
- Manesh Kumar as Bobby Varghese
- Fahadh Faasil as Vishwanathan
- Rupa Manjari as Aswathy Alex
- Praveen Prem as Usman Ali
- John Jacob as Balachandran
- Aaryan Krishna Menon as John Subrahmaniyam
- Prajin as John Subrahmaniyam (fake)
- Salim Kumar as Karuppayya
- Kochu Preman as Cleetus
- Indrans as the tribal man
- Siddique as coach

== Soundtrack ==
Tournament

Soundtrack album by Deepak Dev
- Recorded: 2010
- Genre: Feature film soundtrack
- Length: 23:11
- Producer: Deepak Dev

The songs are composed by Deepak Dev, making this his first collaboration with Lal. The soundtrack album, which was released in December 2010, features six songs overall, with lyrics penned by Vayalar Sharath Chandra Varma. The song "Nila Nila" is repeated at the end of the album, with Karthik being credited for both songs.

Track listing
No.	Title	Lyrics	Singer(s)	Length
1.	"Heyyo"	Vayalar Sharath Chandra Varma	Vinod Varma, Maya Iyer, Sreecharan	05:26
2.	"Manassil"	Vayalar Sharath Chandra Varma	Naresh Iyer, Deepak Dev, Megha	04:36
3.	"Mayile" (Karaoke)	Vayalar Sharath Chandra Varma	Instrumental only	04:35
4.	"Nila Nila"	Vayalar Sharath Chandra Varma	Karthik, Megha	05:04
5.	"Nila Nila II" (Karaoke)	Vayalar Sharath Chandra Varma	Instrumental only	05:04
6.	"Nila Nila III" (Unplugged)	Vayalar Sharath Chandra Varma	Karthik	04:10
Total length:				23:11

== Reception ==
Paresh C Palicha from Rediff.com wrote "With Tournament, director Lal makes a departure from his typical mimicry humour. But the film falls into the genre of crass comedy, which is a huge disappointment" Sify.com wrote "Tournament has its moments and the ?replay? format gets the viewers involved in the storyline right from the beginning itself. But then, that turns out to be the problem with the film as well, as the plot seems to be too simple to become a taut thriller"
