= Kaly (film) =

- Poster
- Directed by: Najeem Koya
- Written by: Najeem Koya; Arouz Irfan
- Produced by: Prithviraj Sukumaran; Santosh Sivan; Shaji Nadesan; Arya
- Starring: Shebin Benson; Anil K Reji; Vidya Vijay; Aiswarya Suresh
- Cinematography: Sajith Purushan
- Edited by: Rahman Muhammed Ali
- Music by: Rahul Raj
- Production company: August Cinema
- Distributed by: August Cinema
- Release date: 9 February 2018
- Country: India
- Language: Malayalam

Kaly (transl. Game) is a 2018 Indian Malayalam-language thriller drama film co-written and directed by Najeem Koya. Produced by Shaji Nadesan, Prithviraj Sukumaran, Arya, and Santosh Sivan through August Cinema. Screenplay and Dialogues written by Najeem Koya and Arouz Irfan (who wrote story, screenplay and dialogues for 'IDI'). It features Shebin Benson, Anil K Reji, Shalu Rahim, Vidhya Vijay in lead roles. The film was released on 9 February 2018.

== Cast ==
- Shebin Benson as Sameer Shajahan / Sam
- Shalu Rahim as Poul Chandy/Paachan, Poppy's boyfriend
- Indian Pallassery as Andhakaram Aneesh
- Aiswarya Suresh as Poojitha Moothedan, Sameer's love interest(girlfriend)
- Vidya Vijay as Sandra a.k.a. Poppy, Pachan's girlfriend
- Anil K Reji as Shanu Nazar
- Suhaid Kukku as Abu
- Siraj as Bijoy, Poppy's brother
- Joju George as Circle Inspector Thilakan.T, The main antagonist
- Shammi Thilakan as Balan Moothedan, Poojitha's father
- Tini Tom as Jayarajan
- Baburaj as Haridasan
- Baiju Ezhupunna as Sathaan Velu
- Rajesh Hebbar as Patrick Xavier
- Vk Baiju as Alexi
- Balaji Sarma as Sajan
- Prashanth Alexander as Sathar
- Aneesh Gopal as Richie
- Sajan Palluruthi as Shajahan, Sameer's father
- Sona Nair as Zeenath Shajahan, Sameer's mother
- Megha Mathew as Andriya

== Soundtrack ==
All lyrics are written by P. S. Rafeeque; all music is composed by Rahul Raj.

No.	Title	Artist(s)	Length
1.	"Chunk Chakkare"	Sunil Mathai
2.	"Kinnam Katta Kallan"	Sooraj Santhosh, Rahul Raj
3.	"Poo Poothuvo"	K. S. Harisankar, Radhika Narayanan
