= Praveen Prem =

South Indian film actor (born 1984)

- Born: 21 April 1984 (age 42)
- Occupation: Actor
- Years active: 2010–present

Praveen Prem (born 21 April 1984) is an Indian actor who works predominantly in Malayalam cinema in comedic roles. He is known for his roles in Tournament (2010) and 7th Day (2014).

== Background and career ==
A native of Maruthoorkadavu, Trivandrum, Kerala, after secondary education Praveen obtained a certificate in film and video editing from the state-owned Keltron. He started his film career as an assistant editor to south Indian film editor Mahesh Narayanan in 2008. He assisted him for one year on several feature and advertising films. After he left editing, Praveen joined Soorya Krishnamoorthy to become part of his Soorya Theatre Group, appearing in amateur theatre plays in 2009. The two plays in which he appeared for Soorya—Pulari and Sookshmacharcha— helped in his transition to movie acting and were staged all over Kerala and Muscat. He received his first movie approach from Malayalam director Sathyan Anthikad in 2010.

He became a television anchor in 2013 on the cookery show Pacchamulaku shown on Media One TV.

He began his acting career in 2010 in the Malayalam language film Kadha Thudarunnu. His first major role in Malayalam cinema came through the movie Tournament – Play & Replay directed by Lal in which he played Usman Ali. Prem next appeared as several comedy characters in Malayalam movies, taking on the role of the hero Kiran in the 2013 movie Crocodile Love Story. Prem made his debut in the Tamil film industry in 2014 after director O.S. Ravi cast him as the male lead in the movie Dummy Tappasu.

Praveen appeared as one of five idiots in K. S. Bava's 2012 comedy Idiots. His character in the movie 7th Day garnered praise from critics and the film went on to become the first 2014 Malayalam blockbuster.

== Filmography ==
Films

Year	Film	Role	Language	Notes
2010	Kadha Thudarunnu	Harichandran	Malayalam	
2010	Tournament – Play & Replay	Usman Ali	Malayalam	
2011	Snehaveedu	Balan	Malayalam	
2011	Fathers Day	Friend	Malayalam	
2011	Pulival Pattanam	Driver	Malayalam	
2012	Ideal Couple		Malayalam	
2012	StreetLight	Room Boy	Malayalam	
2012	Mullassery Madhavan Kutty Nemom P. O.	Baiju Prathap	Malayalam	
2012	Idiots	Mani	Malayalam	
2013	Annayum Rasoolum	Kammath	Malayalam	
2013	Sim	Unnipilla	Malayalam	
2013	Rebecca Uthup Kizhakkemala	Unni	Malayalam	
2013	Crocodile Love Story	Kiran	Malayalam	
2014	7th Day	Cyril Samual aka Cycle	Malayalam	
2015	Dummy Tappasu	Sree	Tamil	
2015	ATM	Bombay	Malayalam	
2017	Tubelight	Saba	Tamil	
2020	Mane Number 13	Karthick	Kannada	
2020	13aam Number Veedu	Karthick	Tamil	

=== Television ===
Year	Show	Role	Channel	Notes
2011	Marimayam	Perakkutty	Mazhavil Manorama	Sitcom
2012	Daivathinte Swantham Devootty	Devu's brother in law	Mazhavil Manorama	TV series
2013-2014	Pachamulaku	Host	Media One	Cookery show
2016-2018	Salt N Pepper	Host	Kaumudy TV	Cookery show
2020	Koodathayi		Flowers	TV series
2021	Varnappakittu	Jaggu	Surya TV	TV series
2021	I Am The Sorry	Varun	YouTube	Web series
2022	Daya: Chentheeyil Chalicha Kumkumapottu		Asianet	TV series
2022	Bhagyalakshmi	Prem	Zee Keralam	TV series
