= Mike (2022 film) =

2022 Indian film by Vishnu Sivaprasad

- Theatrical release poster
- Directed by: Vishnu Sivaprasad
- Written by: Ashiq Akbar Ali
- Produced by: John Abraham
- Starring: Anaswara Rajan; Ranjith Sajeev
- Cinematography: Renadive
- Edited by: Vivek Harshan
- Music by: Hesham Abdul Wahab
- Production company: JA Entertainment
- Distributed by: Century Release
- Release date: 19 August 2022
- Running time: 108 minutes
- Country: India
- Language: Malayalam

Mike is a 2022 Indian Malayalam-language coming-of-age film directed by Vishnu Sivaprasad and wriiten by Ashiq Akbar Ali. It was produced by John Abraham with his company JA Entertainment, marking his debut production in Malayalam. The film stars Anaswara Rajan in the title role along with a debutant Ranjith Sajeev. The music was composed by Hesham Abdul Wahab. The film was released in theatres on 19 August 2022.

== Plot ==
Sarah Thomas, a free spirited young girl is looking to surgically reassign her gender. Antony John is a once exuberant but now a hopeless young man, who has an alcohol use disorder. Sarah alias Mike is on her gender transitioning journey. She meets Antony during the journey. The quick camaraderie developed persuades the duo to travel ahead together.

== Cast ==
- Anaswara Rajan as Sarah Thomas (Mike)
- Ranjith Sajeev as Antony John
- Rohini as Lakshmi, Antony's mother
- Vettukili Prakash as Thomas, Sarah's father
- Sini Abraham as Shirly, Sarah's mother
- Roshan Chandra as Abraham, Sarah's neighbour and Taekwondo instructor
- Jinu Joseph as Dr. Mathew Cheriyan
- Abhiram Radhakrishnan as Umesh, Antony's friend
- Akshay Radhakrishnan as Sanal, Antony's friend
- Rakesh Murali as Kasim, Antony's friend
- Dayyana Hameed as Swathi, Antony's friend
- Rahul as Jithin, Sarah's friend
- Karthik Manikandan as Robi, Sarah's friend
- Nehan Amjath as Jino, Sarah's friend

== Production ==
The marks the debut production of Bollywood actor-producer John Abraham in Malayalam cinema, with his company J.A. Entertainment. Filming began on 20 October 2021 in Mysore, shooting also took place at Kattappana, Vaikom, and Dharamshala.

== Release ==
The film was released in theatres on 19 August 2022.

== Music ==
The original background score and songs were composed by Hesham Abdul Wahab. Music album was distributed by Sony Music.

Track listing
No.	Title	Lyrics	Singer(s)	Length
1.	"Ladki"	Suhail Koya	Sithara Krishnakumar	4:14
2.	"Move Your Body"	Vinayak Sasikumar	Siddharth Menon	3:20
3.	"Nee"	Kaithapram	Sid Sriram	3:54
4.	"Jeevane"	Rafeeq Ahammed	Vijay Yesudas, Nithya Mammen	3:44
5.	"Na Na Na"	Arun Alat	Benny Dayal	3:19
6.	"Aakashame"	Abdul Mannan Mansoor	Hesham Abdul Wahab	3:14

== Critical response ==
The Times of India gave it a rating of 2.5/5 and wrote "On the whole, peripherally it could be a one time watch but the regressive thoughts in it would definitely influence the public opinion on gender roles, gender inclusivity and sensibility". Onmanorama wrote that "Empathy is at the core of this Anaswara Rajan film."
