= Qalb (film) =

- Directed by: Sajid Yahiya
- Written by: Sajid Yahiya
- Produced by: Vijay Babu
- Starring: Ranjith Sajeev; Neha Nazneen
- Edited by: Amal Manoj
- Music by: Prakash Alex; Vimal Nazar; Nihal Sadiq
- Production companies: Fragrant Nature; Friday Film House
- Release date: 12 January 2024
- Running time: 148 minutes
- Country: India
- Language: Malayalam

Qalb is a 2024 Indian Malayalam-language romantic tragedy film written and directed by Sajid Yahiya featuring Ranjith Sajeev, Neha Nazneen and Siddhique.

This movie was released on 12 January 2024 and generated positive reviews and become a blockbuster, praising its love scenes after its OTT release in December through Amazon prime video.

== Premise ==
Two young hearts falling in love. The ride takes you through the 7 stages of love.

== Plot ==
In the coastal town of Alappuzha, lives Leonardo Caplo, a carefree young man who dreams of migrating to Europe with his friends by marrying a foreign woman. He lives with his affectionate father, Sayippu, who runs a small café on Dolphin Beach. Having lost his mother at a young age, Caplo shares a close bond with his father and the café's helper, Asura Aunty. Calpo spends most of his days partying with his friends—Pliko, Trimol, and Jamaica.

One day, Caplo is asked by Sauda, a new resident in the neighborhood, to catch her escaped mynah bird. While climbing a tree to retrieve it, he notices Sauda's daughter, Thumbi, and is instantly captivated by her beauty—the first stage of love, Hubb (attraction). Distracted, Caplo slips and falls into the lake, and later tries to mischievously sell the bird online. The next day, Thumbi visits his home to reclaim it, and though hesitant, pays him to get it back.

Later, during the release of Bheeshma Parvam, Caplo and his friends attend the first show, where Thumbi also arrives with her best friend Reena, who happens to be close to Caplo. Amidst the screening, a group of goons starts a brawl over a missing scene, leading to a fight between them and Caplo's group. The police intervene, arresting the troublemakers. Meanwhile, Thumbi returns home only to face her abusive father's anger for going to the cinema without his permission. Soon after, Thumbi travels to visit her ailing grandmother in her mother's hometown. Caplo joins her on the train, and during the journey, they bond over personal stories. Thumbi tells him about the mythical Sidra tree, where departed loved ones wait across the seven seas. Realizing his son's growing affection, Sayippu encourages Caplo to confess his feelings. Nervously, Caplo visits Thumbi's college and invites her to Dolphin Beach, promising to show her dolphins.

Sayippu tells Caplo an old fisherman's belief—that dolphins appear in pairs before those who truly love each other. Initially disappointed when no dolphins appear, Caplo and Thumbi are astonished when a pod suddenly surfaces before them, deepening their connection. Moved by the sight, Caplo shyly reveals the fisherman's belief to Thumbi, explaining that dolphins only appear before those destined to be together. Smiling, Thumbi softly agrees that the belief is true—signifying that she accepts his feelings —the second and third stages of love, Uns (infatuation) and Ishq (love).

One night, believing Thumbi has invited him over, Caplo visits her home. When a burglary breaks out next door, her frightened mother rushes into the room and discovers Caplo hiding. Horrified, Sauda pleads with him never to see her daughter again. Heartbroken, Caplo's father consoles him, explaining that true love endures challenges. When Caplo confronts Thumbi, she insists they must end things for her mother's sake, despite his pleas. This marks the fourth stage—Junoon (madness).

Both fall into despair. When Thumbi later sees Caplo with another girl—unaware she's his cousin—she confronts him in jealousy and demands to meet his father. During their conversation, Sayippu tells Thumbi how she has taught Caplo the meaning of love, and the two reconcile, entering the fifth stage, Akidat (reverence).

They spend a joyful evening at the Alappuzha Beach Festival, taking a photo together at a booth run by Sayippu's friend Freddy, who explains the seven stages of love. At a lighthouse, Thumbi gifts Caplo a bracelet engraved with the word “Qalb” (heart), symbolizing Ibaadat (worship), the sixth stage.

Their happiness is short-lived. When Thumbi's father catches her speaking to Caplo on the phone, he becomes violent toward Sauda. For the first time, Thumbi stands up to him, vowing to protect her mother. That night, she calls Caplo to take her away, leaving her mother behind. During their escape, their car hits a pedestrian, forcing Caplo to check on the man. The same goons from the theater ambush them, leading to a brutal fight before both are arrested.

At the police station, Thumbi's father—revealed to be a police officer—beats Sayippu and warns that if Caplo ever approaches Thumbi again, he will imprison them all. Separated and devastated, Caplo and his father plan to secretly send Thumbi abroad to safety with Sayippu's sister in Thailand, with Sauda's blessing. However, their plan is exposed when Thumbi's father falsely accuses them of drug trafficking.

At court, overcome with guilt, Thumbi calls Caplo, apologizing for the chaos her love has caused. She ends the call and takes her own life, completing the seventh and final stage—Mawt (death).

Thumbi's funeral is held in Caplo's hometown, where her mother Sauda insists that her daughter be buried there, saying it is the land of all her loved ones. Shattered, Caplo begs his father to let him die, feeling responsible for her death. The next day, he visits Theresa Aunty and reveals his plan to reach the Sidra tree—where his mother and Thumbi await—and asks her to care for his father once he's gone. Caplo sails into the sea, attempting to drown himself, and in a vision, sees Thumbi reaching out to him. Before he can follow her, Sayippu and his friends rescue him. Sayippu tearfully reminds his son that parents who lose their children are the weakest of all, and that Caplo's life is what keeps him alive.

Realizing the depth of his father's love, Caplo reconciles with him and his friends, embracing Hayyath (life). The film closes with Caplo releasing Thumbi's pet mynah back into the sky as a dragonfly(symbolizing Thumbi) —hovers nearby, watching over him.

== Cast ==
- Ranjith Sajeev as Leonardo Calpo
- Neha Nasnin as Thumbi
- Siddique as Sayippu, Calpo's father
- Lena as Sauda
- Athira Patel as Reena
- Sreedhanya as Advocate Treesa
- Sanoop Kumar as Bheemboy
- Jaffar Idukki as Kabeer
- Ashiq Khalid as Saifudeen (Thumbi's Father)
- Sarasa Balussery as Asura Aunty
- Surjith Gopinath as Freddy uncle

== Production ==
The film was announced on 20 November 2019, and it is produced by Cinema Pranthan in association with Arjun Amaraavathi Creations. The crew was planning to shoot this film entirely in Alappuzha. The film would contain 12 songs composed by Prakash Alex, Vimal Nasar, Renish Basheer and Nihal Sadiq. Bollywood singer Atif Aslam is also to be a part of this film.

The filming of the movie was revived in 2020 after it was put on hold, with Ranjith Sajeev being one of the lead characters.

== Release ==
Qalb received mixed to negative reviews from critics upon release. While the film's cinematography, music, and performances were praised, its screenplay and pacing were criticized for being predictable and melodramatic. Critics described it as a “visually appealing but emotionally shallow romantic drama.”

At the box office, Qalb performed poorly, registering a weak theatrical run and being regarded as a commercial flop. However, after its release on Amazon Prime Video, the film gained a better response from audiences, with many appreciating its emotional themes and visual style. This led to Qalb achieving moderate popularity on streaming platforms, despite its initial theatrical failure.

Qalb received mixed to negative reviews from critics. Nowrunning rated it 2/5, calling it “a clichéd yet visually rich romantic drama.” OTTplay gave 2.5/5, praising its cinematography and performances but criticizing its slow pace and predictable writing. Filmibeat noted that while the movie flopped theatrically, it later gained appreciation after its OTT release for its emotional storytelling and music. Overall, critics described Qalb as a visually appealing but uneven love story that resonated more with audiences online than in theatres.

== Music ==
Soundtrack listing for Qalb (2024)
#	Song	Singer(s)
1	Qalbee	Vineeth Sreenivasan
2	Ninne Kandannu	Hesham Abdul Wahab
3	Alappuzha Mullakal	Hanan Shaah
4	Maangatha	Nihal Sadiq; AK-Hash; DJ Agnivesh
5	Monjathi	ChristaKala; Christajyothi; Athira Janakan
6	Maanathu	Sajeer Koppam

== Accolades ==
Year	Award	Category	Recipient	Ref.
2024	Kerala Film Critics Association Awards	Best Debut Actress	Neha Nasnin	
2024	Kerala Film Critics Association Awards	Special Jury Award for excellence in Acting	Jaffar Idukki	
