= Manesh Kumar =

Indian actor

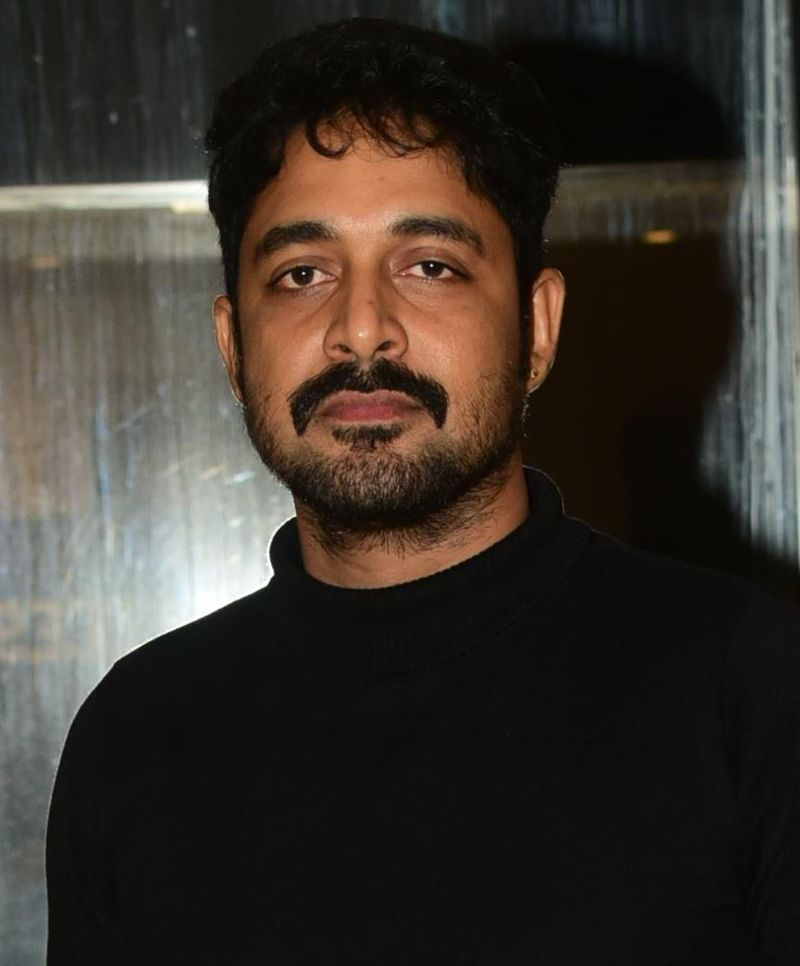
- Born: Thrissur, Kerala, India
- Education: Amity College
- Occupation: Actor
- Years active: 2007–present

Manesh Kumar, better known by his stage name Manu Lal, is an Indian actor who works primarily in Malayalam films.

== Early life ==
Manesh Kumar was born in Thrissur, Kerala, India. He attended his school in Perumbavoor, graduated with a Bachelor of Arts from Amity College and acquired further Diploma from Ernakulam.

== Career ==
Manu made his acting debut in the Malayalam music album Kunkumam in 2007, where he appeared in the song "Puthilanji Thazhvarayil." He further gained popularity with his role as Krishna in the song "Ambadikanna," featured in the 2009 album Sree Nandanam, sung by Shweta Mohan.

In 2010, Manu made his film debut in the lead role as Bobby Varghese in the Malayalam film Tournament directed by Lal.

Following his debut, Manu continued to establish himself as an actor in Malayalam cinema, taking on diverse roles in films such as Friday (2012 film) Double Barrel (2015 film), and Oru Mexican Aparatha (2017). He also starred in films like Thrissur Pooram (film) and Munthiri Monchan (2019).

In 2024, he ventured into the world of web series with his role as Deven Kupleri in 1000 Babies, a thriller released on Disney+ Hotstar. He has spoken about this latest role as his comeback work after having looked at a strong role for over 18 years.

== Filmography ==
Year	Title	Role	Ref.
2010	Tournament	Bobby Varghese	
2012	Friday	Muneer	
2013	Rose Guitarinaal	Joe	
2015	Double Barrel	Ummer	
2017	Oru Mexican Aparatha	Krishnan	
2018	Suvarna Purushan		
2018	Ottakoru Kaamukan		
2019	Thrissur Pooram	Kannan	
2019	Munthiri Monchan	Vivek Viswanath	
2024	Anweshippin Kandethum	Sudeep Nair	

== Web Series ==
Year	Title	Role	Ref.
2024	1000 Babies	Devan Kupleri	
