= Aaryan Krishna Menon =

Indian actor

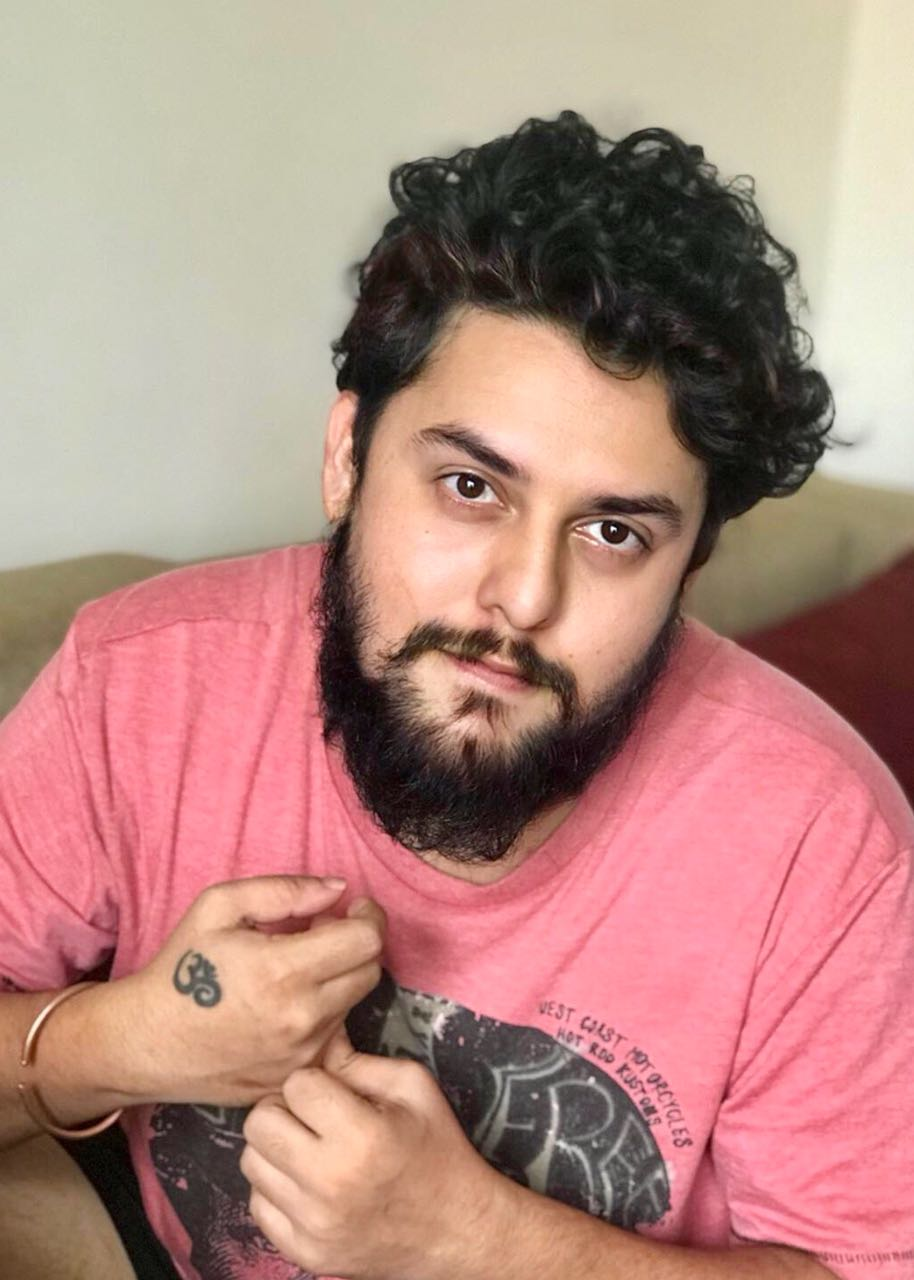
- Born: 26 October 1986; Thrissur, Kerala, India
- Education: University of Calicut
- Occupations: Actor, screenwriter, director
- Years active: 2010–present
- Spouse: Sowmya Vidyadhar (m. 2015)
- Children: 3

Aaryan Krishna Menon is an Indian actor, screenwriter, and director, primarily working in the Malayalam film industry.

Aaryan made his acting debut in the film Tournament in 2010 and later starred in the Malayalam romantic drama Pranayam in 2011. He played a leading role with Lal in the Malayalam short film "Debt" (2010), which won three Kerala state awards.

He later ventured into directing with a short film titled "Burn My Body". Written and directed by him, the movie was acclaimed for its conceptualization, theme, and craft. It went viral online, becoming one of the highest-viewed Malayalam short films by grossing 1.3 million YouTube views after three months. The E-buzz section from Mathrubhumi, news daily, reported, "A truth that is hard-hitting on the audience has been filmed with perfection and ease in just under 30 mins". E-magazine Evartha described it as "a movie par excellence in its kind as it dealt with a storyline that had never been told before".

== Early life ==
Aaryan was born to M. S. Girijavallabhan and T. K. Remani in Kodungallur, in the Thrissur district of Kerala, India. He has two brothers, Arjun Menon and Abhimanyu Menon. Aaryan completed his bachelor's degree in Electronics from Prajyoti Niketan College, Puthukkad. Aaryan aspired to build a career in film from a very young age. He was an avid theater artist and performed in numerous professional dramas and plays during his college days and has won several university-level awards and recognition.

== Personal life ==
Aaryan is married to Sowmya Vidhyadhar since September 2015. The couple has three daughters, Sana, Prakruthi, and Shakthi.

== Career ==
After receiving a postgraduate diploma in Journalism, Aaryan began his career as a senior radio jockey at Mathrubhumi Club FM. While working in Mathrubhumi, he conceptualized and hosted a popular celebrity chat show called Star Jam where he received an opportunity to interview Mammooty, a Malayalam actor. Impressed by Menon's passion for cinema, Lal, an actor who had accompanied Mammooty to the interview, cast Aaryan in the lead role in Tournament. Menon played the antagonist in the movie. His performance was well received and launched his acting career. Until 2012, he actively appeared in shorts and feature films, after which he shifted residence to Dubai and resumed his career as a radio jockey. In 2015 he made a comeback in his directorial debut with a short film titled "Burn My Body" and garnered praise for his bold attempt at filming and raising awareness about a complicated issue, necrophilia. "Burn My Body" and its poster is included as a reference for "Necrophilia", for MBBS students in Textbook of Forensic Medicine and Toxicology, edited by V V Pillay.

== Filmography ==
Key
†	Denotes films that have not yet been released

Year	Title	Role	Director	Notes
2010	Tournament – Play & Replay	John Subramaniyam	Lal	
2011	Pranayam	Young Achuthan Menon	Blessy	Teenage role of Anupam Kher
2012	"Debt"	Jude	Lal Jr.	Short film, released directly in television
2013	"Srishti Samhara"	Artist	Anoop P.	Short film
2015	"Burn My Body"		Himself	Short film; directorial debut
2017	The Great Father	Office executive	Haneef Adeni	
2018	Lilli	Ajith	Prasobh Vijayan	
2018	Koodasa	Antony	Dinu Thomas Eelan	
2020	King Fish	Ashwin Kumar	Anoop Menon	
2021	One	Jaimon	Santhosh Vishwanathan	
