= Ranjith Sajeev =

Indian actor

- Born: Dubai, United Arab Emirates
- Occupation: Actor
- Years active: 2022–present

Ranjith Sajeev is an Indian actor who works in Malayalam films. Ranjith begun his acting career in the film Mike (2022).

== Career ==
In 2022, Ranjith Sajeev debuted in the Malayalam film Mike in the lead role co-starring Anaswara Rajan directed by Vishnu Sivaprasad and produced by John Abraham. His role as ASP Sandeep Krishnan in Golam was critically acclaimed.

== Filmography ==
=== Films ===
Key
†	Denotes films that have not yet been released

Year	Title	Role(s)	Notes	Ref.
2022	Mike	Antony John	Debut film	
2024	Qalb	Leonardo Calpo		
2024	Golam	ASP Sandeep Krishnan IPS		
2025	United Kingdom of Kerala	Tony		
2025	Rambo	Gautham Periyathambi	Tamil film	
2025	Modha †	TBA		
2026	Half †	TBA		

== Accolades ==
- Kerala Film Critics Awards for Best Debutant Actor
