= 1000 Babies =

- Genre: Crime thriller
- Written by: Najeem Koya; Arouz Irfan
- Directed by: Najeem Koya
- Starring: Neena Gupta; Rahman
- Composer: Sankar Sharma
- Country of origin: India
- Original language: Malayalam
- No. of seasons: 1
- No. of episodes: 7

Production
- Producers: Shaji Nadesan; Arya
- Production location: India
- Cinematography: Faiz Siddik
- Editor: Johnkutty
- Running time: 38-55 minutes
- Production company: August Cinema

Original release
- Network: Disney+ Hotstar
- Release: October 18, 2024

1000 Babies is a 2024 Indian Malayalam crime thriller miniseries directed by Najeem Koya. The series is written by Koya and Arouz Irfan, with cinematography by Faiz Siddik. The series was released on Disney+ Hotstar on 18 October 2024.

== Plot synopsis ==
Sarah Ouseph is suffering from hallucinations probably related to her earlier career as an obstetric head nurse. She's living with her son, Bibin Ouseph, in Mundakkayam after retirement. Sarah is very controlling and Bibin is apparently okay with that. He works as a lab technician nearby and caters to all the needs of Sarah.

On a fateful day, Sarah reveals disturbing secrets related to her past to Bibin, and struggling to deal with how Sarah changed his destiny, Bibin attacks her and flees with Sarah's diaries. Sarah is admitted to a hospital and requests the doctor to arrange a meeting with a local CI and a legal advisor. She hands over 2 letters to them, one for the police and one for the magistrate. Soon after, Sarah dies while the police decide not to pursue the crimes done by Sarah as there is no way to deal with the social situation if her secrets are out in public.

However, the truth overwhelms Bibin and he chooses to go and learn more about his biological parents. As soon as he learns the one who was swapped with him is treating his parents poorly, he decides to make her go away and deviously concocts a plan that leads to her death.

Possessing information of the babies his foster mother swapped, he goes through one by one with the help of like-minded people who share his ideology, with the intention of eliminating individuals from the face of the Earth, especially those who did not live up to the opportunities they were given. However, he also starts sending a series of cryptic letters to a friend, which catches the attention of the Kerala police, and they are on his trail, led by Inspector Aji Kurien.

== Cast ==
- Neena Gupta as Sarah Ouseph (voice dubbed by Jayalakshmi)
  - Radha Gomati as Young Sarah Ouseph (voice dubbed by Jayalakshmi)
- Rahman as CI Aji Kurian
- Sanju Sivram as Bibin Ouseph/Naisam Ali/Harshan
- Joy Mathew as Magistrate Samuel K. Sam
- Adil Ibrahim as SI Anzari
- Ashwin K Kumar as Sanjeev "SK" Krishna
- Dain Davis as Suneer
- Shaju Sreedhar as SI Vinod Pankajakshan
- Viviya Santh as Merlin
- Irshad Ali as MLA Pinto Varghese
- Sathi Premji as Mrs Kurian
- Manesh Kumar as Devan Kupleri
- Srikant Murali as Hareendran Kupleri
- Radhika Radhakrishnan as Ancy Sanjeev
- James Eliya as Advocate Rajan Varkey
- Dileep Menon as Commissioner/SP Anil Das IPS
- Sreekanth Balachandran as DYSP/CI Nawaz Hussain
- Sirajudheen Nazar as Bibin
- Shalu Rahim as Khalil Gibran
- V. K. Prakash as Mohan Swaminathan
- Uma K.P. as Rekha Mohan
- Dhanesh Anand as SI Vivek Maniyan
- Sivakumar as Bhasi
- Nazlin Saleem as Renuka Mohan
- Adhil Bruno as Izahak Ahammed
- Shanid Rahman as Naveen Pavithran
- Chaithra Praveen as Amrutha Ayyappan
- Vyshakh as Forensic Expert
- Thomas G. Kannampuzha as Dr Sunil
- Vijayakumar Prabhakaran as Sabjaan
- Favour Francis as Murali
- Kannan Nair as Sachi
- Deepa Rani as Thanvi
- Thonakkal Jayachandran as Layikka
- Vineeth as SI Imam Mubarak
- Renu Vineeth as ACP Nithya Muthayya IPS
- Subin as Kalesh
- Akshay Akku as Unni
- Claire C John as Darshana
- Sajitha Sreejith as Rani
- Pugalenthi as Parabrahmam
- Sony as Joshy Thankathanam
- Yahiya Khader as Williams
- Pranayamoorthy as Bibin's Bangalore House Owner

== Episodes ==
No. in season	Title	Original release date
1	"Prequel"	18 October 2024
2	"Sequel"	18 October 2024
3	"Legacy"	18 October 2024
4	"First half"	18 October 2024
5	"Interval"	18 October 2024
6	"Second half"	18 October 2024
7	"Anti-climax"	18 October 2024

== Production ==
The series began production in May 2023. Earlier it was titled as "1000+ Babies". It marked the return of Neena Gupta to Malayalam project after 32 years.

== Release ==
The teaser of the series was released on 23 August 2024. The trailer was released on 9 October 2024 which announced the release date as 18 October 2024. The series was released on 18 October 2024 on Disney+ Hotstar.

== Reception ==
The series received positive response from critics. Gayathri Krishna of OTTPlay rated the series 3.5 out of 5 stars and called it "A well-crafted crime thriller that keeps viewers glued to their seats, thanks to the performances". Christy Rosy Sibi of The Week rated the film 3/5 and termed it "a twisted psychological series driven by plot convenience".
