= 10 Kalpanakal =

- Theatrical-release poster
- Directed by: Don Max
- Screenplay by: Don Max; Shins K Jose; Sangeeth Jain
- Story by: Don Max
- Produced by: Jiji Anchani; Manu Padmanabhan Nair; Biju Thoranathel; Jacob Koeypurath; Antony P. Thekkek; Mesfin Zacharis
- Starring: Meera Jasmine; Prashant Narayanan; Shebin Benson; Anoop Menon
- Cinematography: Kishore Mani
- Music by: Mithun Eshwar
- Production company: Shutter Bugs
- Distributed by: UGM Entertainment; Ananya Films
- Release date: 25 November 2016
- Country: India
- Language: Malayalam

10 Kalpanakal (transl. Ten Commandments) is a 2016 Indian Malayalam-language crime thriller film directed by Don Max. It is written by Shins K. Jose and Sangeeth Jain, and based on a story by Max. It stars Meera Jasmine and Prashant Narayanan in lead roles, with Anoop Menon, Shebin Benson, Kaniha, Joju George, and Thampi Antony in supporting roles. 10 Kalpanakal received positive reviews with critics praising the screenplay, performances, and direction.

== Plot ==
10 Kalpanakal is told as a narration of a former SP, Shazia Akbar, to students of law and criminology. She narrates the strangest case in her career, which includes forest officer Davis George; Davis's family; a girl named Angel, whom Davis considered like his daughter; and Victor, a psychopath. Angel is found dead in a forest after a festival. Shazia, a police officer, enters the scene but is unable solve the case due to the lack of a convincing suspect with a motive.

Years later, she runs upon the case of a probable psychopath, Victor, who abducts girls and women, locks them up in his house, and brutally kills them. Victor had the habit of storing photographs of his victims to-be. Among his photo gallery of victims to-be, a photo of Angel is discovered. Shazia contacts Davis and they try to get the truth out of Victor. Davis is suspicious of Vakkachan, whom he distrusts, but Vakkachan says that it is not him and that if Davis puts more accusations on him to tarnish his image, he will end Davis. Victor requests to have a conversation with Davis, and tells him that he was merely an eye-witness to the actual murder and that the original killer was John, Davis's son.

Heartbroken, Davis attempts to pacify himself that it was not John. But circumstantial evidence, such as John coming home late, his collection of photos of her, and his tensed expression on his return, all point to John as the killer. David brings John to a statue of Jesus, asking him to beg for forgiveness, and takes out his revolver. He attempts to kill his own son, but John later reveals that he did meet Angel on the night she died, but the last time he saw her was before returning home.

On the way to court with Shazia, Victor reveals that, in telling Davis that John killed Angel, he intended to thwart Davis's suspicion and cloud his mind with emotions. The court relieves Victor of all accusations due to lack of evidence. Shazia considers this a failure. She ends her speech and later goes to visit Davis, whose house was near the institution she lectured in.

She talks with Davis and leaves, but returns to the house again and that Davis has imprisoned Victor. Victor begs Shazia to convince Davis to kill Victor, but Shazia and Davis smile at each other and the Shazia walks away leaving the Victor to suffer.

== Cast ==
- Meera Jasmine as Shazia Akbar
- Anoop Menon as Davis George
- Shebin Benson as John
- Prashant Narayanan as Victor
- Ritika Badiani as Angel
- Joju George as Vakkachan
- Kaniha as Sara
- Kavitha Nair as Angel's mother
- Thampi Antony
- Ajay
- Jiji Anjani
- Binu Adimali
- Shaji Pillai

== Soundtrack ==
10 Kalpanakal

Soundtrack album by Mithun Eshwar
- Released: 2 November 2016
- Recorded: 2016
- Genre: Film soundtrack
- Language: Malayalam
- Label: Muzik 247
- Producer: Mithun Eshwar

The songs were composed by Mithun Eshwer. S. Janaki sang her final song "Ammapoovinum" in the film before her retirement. The song was released at an event in Abu Dhabi on 4 October 2016.

Track	Song title	Lyricist	Singer(s)
1	"Amma Poovinum"	Roy Puramadam	S. Janaki
2	"Rithu Shalabhame"	Roy Puramadam	Shreya Ghoshal, Uday Ramachandran
3	"Etho Etho"	Roy Puramadam	K. J. Yesudas
4	"Kando Kando"	Roy Puramadam	Vijay Yesudas, Nithya Balagopal
5	"Mulmuna"	Roy Puramadam	Mithun Eshwar
6	"Mizhi Nanayum"	Divya Sooraj	Nithya Balagopal, Mithun Eshwar
7	"Pathu Kalpanakal"	Divya Sooraj	Meera Jasmine, M C Rude, Mithun Eshwar, Varsha Gopinath

== Reception ==
A critic from The Times of India wrote that "10 Kalpanakal re-treads lots of familiar essentials you have already seen in thrillers, but it has what it takes to keep you interested for two hours five minutes".
