= Mohanlal (film) =

2018 film by Sajid Yahiya

- Theatrical release poster
- Directed by: Sajid Yahiya
- Screenplay by: Suneesh Varanad
- Story by: Sajid Yahiya
- Produced by: Anil Kumar
- Starring: Manju Warrier; Indrajith Sukumaran; Salim Kumar; Aju Varghese; Shebin Benson; Soubin Shahir; Siddique; Baby Meenakshi; Krittika Pradeep
- Narrated by: Prithviraj Sukumaran
- Cinematography: Shaji Kumar
- Edited by: Shameer Muhammed
- Music by: Tony Joseph Pallivathukal
- Production company: Mindset Movies
- Distributed by: Full On Studio Frames
- Release date: 14 April 2018 (India)
- Running time: 165 minutes
- Country: India
- Language: Malayalam

Mohanlal is a 2018 Indian Malayalam-language comedy drama film directed by Sajid Yahiya and written by Suneesh Varanad from a story by Yahiya. It stars Indrajith Sukumaran and Manju Warrier. Principal photography took place between May and December 2017 at locations in Ernakulam, Palakkad and Thrissur districts. Mohanlal was released in India on 14 April 2018. The film became a failure at the box office.

== Plot ==
The story starts with Sethumadhavan entering a railway station and meeting Mr Who, a homeless wanderer and his dog. Mr Who deduces accurately that Sethu has come to the station to commit suicide by jumping in front of train. He then asks Sethu to tell him his story before he commits suicide as there is a long time for the next train to pass by the station. The first quarter of the movie shows the childhood and growth into adulthood of Meenukutty and friendship with classmate Sethumadhavan who supports her abnormal adoration of actor Mohanlal and romance develops between the two. It depicts how Meenukutty in every aspect or event in her life finds some connection to Mohanlal and his various movie roles and scenes.

The movie also portrays how Sethumadhavan who marries Meenukutty deals with her manic adoration of Mohanlal which leads to several embarrassing life events for him like how she acts like a madwoman when she goes to see Ravanaprabhu movie whereby earning the utmost respect of the regional Mohanlal fans club members, or how she advises a girl to meet her boyfriend because Mohanlal did it in one movie and Sethu had to deal with parents ire. There are hilarious scenes of her attacking both verbally and physically anyone who complains about Mohanlal movies. She becomes pregnant with a child which is a long cherished dream of Sethu and his family but a late night trip to watch a movie followed by a bike accident on the way back leads to the miscarriage of the child which breaks both Meenu and Sethu's hearts and Sethu relocated from his home village to the city by getting a transfer from his bank job in the village to a branch in the city.

There they meet several colourful characters in the colony and other hilarious scenes occur related to Meenukutty's Mohanlal addiction. The climax of the movie shows Meenukutty being duped by one of the residents of the colony who claims to be a scriptwriter for a Mohanlal movie who takes advantage of Meenukutty's manic addiction to Mohanlal and convinces her to give him all her gold and any money to help her become a producer for a Mohanlal movie. While Meenukutty gives him all her gold ornaments she also finds a bag in the cupboard which was given to Sethu by his close friend as it contained all the money he has collected by selling everything he owned to pay back a bank loan. Meenukutty under a misunderstanding thinks the money is a surprise Sethu had hidden from her to give to Aamod to pay for the movie production and takes it and gives it to Aamod. When Sethu comes back from work and realises what Meenu has done he goes blind with anger and frustration and slaps her and tells her he does not want to live with her and even claims he was a fool not to listen to the villagers and the doctor back home who said Meenu was not mentally well because he loved her and thought they could have a good life together.

Then he leaves the house for the railway station to die because now he will be labelled as a dishonest person and a thief and his reputation as an honest man was one of the most valuable things he had. Mr Who listens to his story and berates him for acting like a coward and tells him to learn from the lessons of Mohanlal movies and how even in situations worse than this the hero faces all his problems headstrong and succeeds in life. Sethu convinced by Mr Who leaves the station and on the way back to his home he calls the Mohanlal fans club leader tells him of a man who committed a scam in the name of Mohanlal and is on the run with the money. The enraged fans ask for a photo of Aamod from Setho in WhatsApp and spread his face across social media using Mohanlal fans and eventually track him to a railway station where he is waiting for a train to escape the city.

The fans and Sethu capture him and retrieve the money. Sethu gets a call from one of his neighbours in the colony telling him to come to the hospital as Meenu has tried to commit suicide. Doctor tells Sethu that his wife is in urgent need for blood and Sethu who felt helpless once again relies on the power of the Mohanlal fan club to get many club members to come and donate blood. The doctor chides Sethu for not understanding what was the underlying cause for Meenu's love for Mohanlal and the Doctor gives Sethu his wife's suicide note where she explains to him that when she was little her father died in an accident and she was depressed and afraid of the world and Mohanlal and his movies gradually helped her become normal in his and that he was the light which helped her come out of her darkest moment in her childhood. Sethu feels guilty and sad for his actions. The final scenes involve Meenu waking up at the Hospital the Doctor and Sethu greet her with smiles and tells her she is fine and well but Meenu is more concerned about how the new Mohanlal film Pulimurugan was doing in the cinemas. The movie ends with both Meenu and Sethu along with fan club members watching Pulimurugan in theaters with celebrations.

== Cast ==
- Mohanlal as himself (strict mention, without actual physical appearance)
- Manju Warrier as Meenakshi (Meenukutty)
  - Krittika Pradeep as Teenage Meenukutty
    - Baby Meenakshi as Childhood Meenukutty
- Indrajith Sukumaran as Sethumadhavan
  - Shebin Benson as Teenage Sethumadhavan
    - Master Vishal Krishna as Young Sethumadhavan
- Bijukuttan as Solomon, Mohanlal fans association secretary
- Unni Krishnan as Unni Lalettan
- Salim Kumar as Sathan Jose
- Aju Varghese as Aluva Aamod
- Soubin Shahir as Mr. Who
- K. P. A. C. Lalitha as Latha, Sethu's mother
- Hareesh Kanaran as Contractor, G.P
- Siddique as Dr. Jacob Peter
- Sreejith Ravi as Sabu
  - Adish Praveen as Young Sabu
- Anjali Nair as Meenukutty's mother (young)
- Balachandran Chullikkadu as Hari, Sethu's father
- Pradeep Kottayam as Kannan, Sethu's uncle
- Krishnakumar as Ashokan, Meenkutty's father
- Jithan V Soubhagom as Pazhani Santhosh
- Riyas Doha
- Gokulan as Mujeeb
- Shafeek Muhammed as Rameshan
- Sudhi Koppa as Villager
- Sunil Sukhada as Kaimal
- Manoj Guinness as Goorka
- Sajan Palluruthy
- Indian Pallassery as Teen Sabu
- Balaji Sarma as Police officer
- Sajid Yahiya as an auto driver
- Maniyanpilla Raju as himself
- Kottayam Nazeer as Padmanabhan
- Unni Rajan P. Dev
- Ambika Mohan as Meenukutty's mother (old)
- Anjana Appukuttan as Mrs. Padmnanabhan
- Praseetha Menon as Ammini
- Sethu Lakshmi as Sheela
- Syama Salim as Meenukutty's friend
- Asha Aravind as Dr. Parvathy
- Sreeya Remesh as Sethu's sister
- Molly Kannamaly as Lady at railway station
- Prithviraj Sukumaran (voice-over)

== Production ==
=== Pre-production ===
The film was initially reported by media outlets in August 2016 as the second directorial of Sajid Yahiya reportedly entitled Mohanlal, which tells the story of an ardent female fan of actor Mohanlal. Later in that month, Yahiya confirmed the project without divulging much details as it was on its early pre-production phase, and was also reported that the makers are trying to register the film's title as Mohanlal and Manju Warrier and Indrajith Sukumaran were cast in the leading roles. The Times of India reported that the film is about a girl who is deeply influenced by Mohanlal's onscreen persona; she was born on the same time as Mohanlal makes his onscreen debut in Manjil Virinja Pookkal's premiere day. Beside directing, Yahiya also wrote the film's story and Anil Kumar was signed to produce the film through Mindset Movies production house.

In May 2017, Indrajith revealed that the film is a humorous "family entertainer" in which he plays a working man in a middle-class family with Warrier playing his wife and how they cope with the issues arising due to his wife's extreme adoration for Mohanlal forms the plot. On Mohanlal's birthday on 21 May, posters were released confirming the title and revealing the character name of Warrier as Meenukutty and Indrajith as Sethumadhavan, both the character names in Mohanlal's early films. In that month, Soubin Shahir and Aju Varghese were confirmed to be in important roles and a casting call was released by Yahiya in search of two child actors for the childhood roles of Warrier and Indrajith. Including them, the film consists of a large star cast. Yahiya describes Meenukutty as a crazy fan who compares everything she encounters to Mohanlal characters, and Sethu (Sethumadhavan) as a "devout husband who supports his wife in everything". He also revealed that the filming would begin in May last week.

=== Filming ===
The film began principal photography on 27 May 2017 in Kochi. In the first schedule, filming took place in and around Ernakulam and at locations in Kolenchery, Ottapalam, and Guruvayur. The schedule was concluded in Kolenchery by 13 June 2017. The complete filming process was wrapped on 23 December 2017.

== Music ==
The film's original songs were composed by debutant Tony Joseph. The soundtrack album consists of 12 tracks. Manu Manjith wrote the lyrics for all songs, except "Aaranu Njhan" (by Suhail Koya). All the songs were major hits especially La La Laletta, Va Va Vo and Thoovenilla.The film's music launch function was held on 9 April 2018 at Gokulam Convention Centre in Kochi. At the function, Mallika Sukumaran released the audio music. Soundtrack album was distributed by the label Zee Music Company.

Mohanlal (Original Motion Picture Soundtrack)
No.	Title	Music	Singer(s)	Length
1.	"La La Laletta"	Tony Joseph Pallivathukal, Nihal Sadiq	Prarthana Indrajith	3:12
2.	"Thoovenilla"	Tony Joseph Pallivathukal	Karthik	4:53
3.	"Va Va Vo"	Tony Joseph Pallivathukal	Nithya Menen, Suchith Suresan	3:26
4.	"Naadum Vitte"	Tony Joseph Pallivathukal	Indrajith Sukumaran	3:03
5.	"Changalla Changidipaane"	Sajid Yahiya, Prakash Alex	Sajid Yahiya, Anil Kumar, Nihal Sadiq	2:42
6.	"Thoovenilla" (Unplugged)	Tony Joseph Pallivathukal	Nithya Menen	4:16
7.	"Va Va Vo Vaave"	Tony Joseph Pallivathukal	Suchith Suresan	3:25
8.	"La La Laletta" (Unplugged)	Tony Joseph Pallivathukal	Prarthana Indrajith, Indrajith Sukumaran	2:41
9.	"Thoovenilla" (Duet)	Tony Joseph Pallivathukal	Sanoop Kumar, Lakshmi Menon	4:53
10.	"Naadum Vitte" (Remix)	Tony Joseph Pallivathukal	Tony Joseph Pallivathukal, Seismic Resonance	3:12
11.	"Mohanlal Mash Up"	Tony Joseph Pallivathukal	Tony Joseph Pallivathukal	4:20
12.	"Aaranu Njhan"	Prakash Alex	Justin Fernandez	1:26

== Release ==
Mohanlal was released in India on 14 April 2018 on the occasion of Vishu festival.
