= Law Point =

- Movie poster
- Directed by: Lijin Jose
- Written by: Devadas
- Produced by: David Kachapally
- Starring: Kunchacko Boban; Namitha Pramod
- Cinematography: Neil D'Cunha
- Edited by: Manoj
- Music by: Songs: Mejo Joseph; Background Score: Bijibal
- Production company: David Kachappilly Productions
- Release date: 1 May 2014
- Running time: 108 minutes
- Country: India
- Language: Malayalam

Law Point is a 2014 Indian Malayalam-language crime thriller film written by Devadas and directed by Lijin Jose. It stars Kunchacko Boban as an advocate and Namitha Pramod as a modern, city bred girl.

== Plot ==
Sathya Mohan is a leading criminal advocate after he successfully wins a rape case against the victim Sainnaba. He is now consulted to handle a compromising situation regarding the suicide attempt of Maya. Dealing with her father, Sathya came to the conclusion that Maya is very bold and intelligent and it is not very easy to convince her and her father. He keeps calm and requests her father to take her for a long drive with him. Sathya tells Maya all sorts of lies about his past and it is then revealed at the end, the whole play was well planned, fooling Sathya.

== Cast ==
- Kunchacko Boban as Adv. Sathya Mohan
  - Master Dhananjay as Young Sathya
- Namitha Pramod as Maya
- Joy Mathew as Jayakumar, Maya's Dad
- Nedumudi Venu as Ramakrishnan
- Riya Saira as Sara
- K. P. A. C. Lalitha as Thressia
- P. Balachandran as Charlie
- Suraj Venjaramoodu as Kurian Joseph
- Kalabhavan Prajod as Mahesh, Sathya's Junior
- Devan as Mohan, Sathya's Father
- Mukundan Palat as Public Prosecutor Govindan
- Praveena as Geetha (Doctor/House Servant)
- Shari as Umadevi, Sathya's Mother
- Thesni Khan
- Krishna Shankar as Abhay
- Janaki
