= Ntikkakkakkoru Premondarnn =

- Film poster
- Directed by: Adhil Maimoonath Asharaf
- Written by: Adhil Maimoonath Asharaf
- Screenplay by: Vivek Bharathan; Jai Vishnu; Sabaridas Thottingal (Additional Screenplay & Dialogues)
- Produced by: Rajesh Krishna; Renish Abdulkhader
- Starring: Sharaf U Dheen; Bhavana; Ashokan; Shebin Benson
- Cinematography: Arun Rushdie
- Edited by: Adhil Maimoonath Asharaf
- Music by: Songs: Nishant Ramtake; Paul Mathews; Joker Blues; Score: Bijibal
- Production companies: London Talkies; Bonhomie Entertainments
- Release date: 24 February 2023
- Country: India
- Language: Malayalam

Ntikkakkakkoru Premondarnn (Translation: My Older Brother Had A Love Affair) is a 2023 Indian Malayalam-language romantic drama film directed by Adhil Maimoonath Asharaf. The film stars Sharaf U Dheen in the lead role, along with Bhavana and Ashokan. It was released on 24 February 2023.

== Summary ==
When a garage owner falls in love with a school teacher who is divorced, they both realise that they have to fight the society before they lead their life as a couple.

== Cast ==
- Sharaf U Dheen as Jimmy
- Bhavana as Nithya
- Ashokan as Abdulkhadar
- Shebin Benson
- Anarkali Nazar as Fida
- Saniya Rafi as Mariyam
- Afsana Lakshmi as Yasmin
- Master Dhruvin
- Srikanth K Vijayan as Varun, Nithya's ex-husband
- Lakshmi Ramakrishnan as Advocate (cameo appearance)

== Production ==
The film was announced in March 2022 under the banner London Talkies and Bonhomie Entertainments, and the principal photography started on 20 June 2022. The film marked the comeback of Bhavana in the Malayalam film industry after a gap of six years. Debutant director Adhil Maimoonath Asharaf was an associate director under Amal Neerad. The film was wrapped up on 18 September 2022 after 60 days of shooting across 12 locations.

== Reception ==
S.R. Praveen of The Hindu wrote, "Bhavana's comeback film is a mature, engagingly told love story."

Gopika S of Times of India gave it a rating of 3.5 out of 5 and stated that "Director Adhil Maimoonath Asharaf has hit the mark with his debut movie". Anna MM Vetticad of Firstpost gave it a 3.5 out of 5 and stated that the film is more than its attractive packaging and sunny surface.

Cris of The News Minute wrote, "The writers, Vivek Bharathan and Sabaridas Thottingal joining Adhil in the scripting play it smart by making the characters themselves blush with embarrassment and laugh aloud, looking at the cheesy letters they wrote in the past. The laughs and the recollection only make their story dearer to you."

A critic from OTTplay gave it a rating of 3 out of 5 stars and stated, "If viewers are searching for a simple, beautiful love story, then the film is a perfect choice. The film veers into predictability when it comes to story, but the charming performances of its lead cast become its saving grace."
