= 8½ Intercuts: Life and Films of K.G. George =

- Directed by: Lijin Jose
- Produced by: Shibu G. Suseelan
- Release date: 2017
- Running time: 109 minutes
- Country: India
- Language: Malayalam

8½ Intercuts: Life and Films of K.G. George is an Indian documentary film produced in Malayalam about K.G. George, one of the leading directors of Indian cinema. The film was screened in 2017th International Film Festival of Goa and selected for non-feature section of Indian panorama. The film was directed by Lijin Jose and produced by Shibu G. Suseelan.
