= Evidey =

2019 film directed by K.K. Rajeev

- Theatrical release poster
- Directed by: K. K. Rajeev
- Written by: Krishnan C.
- Story by: Bobby Sanjay
- Produced by: Joy Thomas; Prem Prakash; Thommikkunju; Suraj Thomas
- Starring: Shebin Benson; Anaswara Rajan; Asha Sharath; Manoj K. Jayan; Prem Prakash; Baiju Santhosh; Suraj Venjaramoodu
- Cinematography: Noushad Shereef
- Edited by: Rajesh Rajenndrran
- Music by: Ouseppachan
- Production companies: Holiday Movies; Jubilee Productions
- Distributed by: Holiday Movies
- Release date: 4 July 2019 (India)
- Country: India
- Language: Malayalam

Evidey (transl. Where) is a 2019 Indian Malayalam-language mystery film directed by K. K. Rajeev and produced by Holiday Movies, a joint venture among Jubilee Productions, Maruthi Pictures, and Prakash Movie Tone. The film stars Shebin Benson, Anaswara Rajan, Asha Sharath and Manoj K. Jayan, with story by Bobby-Sanjay, screen play and dialogues by Krishan C, and music by Ouseppachan.

The film was shot in Idukki, Kerala and Goa. It was released on 4 July 2019.

== Premise ==
Evidey unveils the mystery of a missing man through the story of a woman and her family in an intense search.

The movie throws light on the disastrous consequences of the use of drugs.

== Cast ==
- Shebin Benson as Leen Zacharia
- Anaswara Rajan as Shahana
- Asha Sharath as Jessy Zacharia
- Manoj K. Jayan as Symphony Zacharia
- Suraj Venjaramoodu as Satheeshan
- Baiju Santhosh as SI Simon Tharakan
- Shivaji Guruvayoor as Father Dominic Tharayil
- Kunchan as Kabeer Kallayi
- Prem Prakash as Kuttichan
- Sunil Sukhada as Purushothaman
- Surjith Gopinath as Band Member
