= Tubelight (2017 Tamil film) =

2017 Indian Tamil film by Indra

- Theatrical release poster
- Directed by: Indra
- Written by: Indra
- Produced by: Ravi Narayanan
- Starring: Indra; Adhithi
- Cinematography: G. Sridhar
- Edited by: C. S. Prem
- Music by: Indra
- Production company: Ostrich Media Productions
- Release date: 2 June 2017
- Country: India
- Language: Tamil

Tubelight is a 2017 Indian Tamil-language romantic comedy film written and directed by Indra in his debut along with composing the soundtrack. He also stars alongside Adhithi, with Pandiarajan in a supporting role. The film revolves around a man who is left with a hearing disability following an accident, but rejects his doctor's efforts to cure him after falling in love with an art therapy practitioner. The film was released on 2 June 2017.

== Plot ==
Following an accident, the victim Ram is left with a hearing disability – he can hear things only after a brief delay, of at least five seconds. Mouli, an unorthodox doctor, tries to cure his disability using unconventional means, but Ram, who has fallen in love with an art therapy practitioner named Hema, rejects Mouli's efforts.

== Cast ==
- Indra as Ram
- Adhithi as Hema
- Pandiarajan as Mouli
- Praveen Prem as Saba
- Vinoth as Nattu
- Thriibuvan as Sanjay
- Bujji Babu as Doctor
- Ramani as Dr. Sethu
- Sumathi as Pimp Lady
- Ramesh Pandiyan as Drunkard
- Ramya Shankar as Hema's mother
- Ram Mohan as Hema's father
- Bava Lakshmanan

== Production ==
Tubelight is the acting and directorial debut of Indra who also wrote the script. It was produced by Ravi Narayanan under Ostrich Media Productions. The film is also the acting debut of Adhithi.

== Soundtrack ==
The soundtrack was composed by Indra.

Track listing
No.	Title	Lyrics	Singer(s)	Length
1.	"Ceylon Silku Nila"	Tamilamudhan	Chinmayi	3:55
2.	"Mella Va"	Karthik Neta	Vandana Srinivasan, Unni Menon	3:52
3.	"Kaathirunden"	TamilAmudhan	Sooraj Santhosh, Indra	3:01
4.	"Uruvam Enne En Maname"	TamilAmudhan	Sabari	3:58
Total length:				14:46

== Release and reception ==
Tubelight was released on 2 June 2017. Sify said, "Director Indra shines with his comic writing that he makes us smile at constant intervals but as a film, Tubelight is just an average watch only because of the predictable second half and climax." M. Suganth of The Times of India said, "What is frustrating about Tubelight is how its debutant director, Indra (who is also the composer of the film), fails to take his concept and turn into a cohesive film."
