= Rambo (2025 film) =

2025 film directed by M. Muthaiah

- Official release poster
- Directed by: M. Muthaiah
- Written by: M. Muthaiah
- Produced by: Kalanithi Maran
- Starring: Arulnithi; Tanya Ravichandran; VTV Ganesh; Abhirami; Ranjith Sajeev
- Cinematography: R. D. Rajasekhar
- Edited by: Venkat Raajen
- Music by: Ghibran Vaibodha
- Production company: Sun Entertainment
- Distributed by: Sun NXT
- Release date: 10 October 2025
- Running time: 118 minutes
- Country: India
- Language: Tamil

Rambo (also marketed as Rambo: The Undefeatable) is a 2025 Indian Tamil-language romantic sports action drama film written and directed by M. Muthaiah and produced by Kalanithi Maran under the banner of Sun Entertainment. The film stars Arulnithi in the titular role, alongside Tanya Ravichandran, VTV Ganesh, Abhirami and Ranjith Sajeev (in his Tamil debut).

The film was officially announced in October 2025. It has music composed by Ghibran Vaibodha, cinematography handled by R. D. Rajasekhar and editing by Venkat Raajen.

Rambo was released directly on the streaming service Sun NXT on 10 October 2025.

== Plot ==
Gowtham, a ruthless heir to a vast education empire, and Ram, a compassionate orphanage caretaker, grow up with starkly contrasting values. When Malar uncovers Gowtham's hidden dark secret, it ignites a fierce clash between the two men in a brutal battle of strength and will.

== Cast ==
- Arulnithi as Ramkumar alias Rambo
- Tanya Ravichandran as Malar
- VTV Ganesh as Inspector Karmegham
- Abhirami as Rambo's mother
- Ranjith Sajeev as Gautham Periyathambi, Malar's brother
  - Master Advaith as young Gautham
- Ayesha Zeenath as Sadha Gurumoorthy, Gautham's fiancee and Gurumoorthy's daughter
- Hareesh Peradi
- Baboos Baburaj as Babu, Gurumoorthy's henchmen
- Jenson Dhivakar as Rambo's friend
- Charan Raj as Periyathambi, Gautham and Malar's father
- Gajaraj as Rambo's houseowner
- Kumar Natarajan as Gurumoorthy, Sadha's father
- Dragon Manju as Bomb Bhaskar, Gautham's henchmen
- Rajendran
- Semmalar Annam
- Cable Sankar as Malar's lawyer

== Music ==
Rambo

Soundtrack album by Ghibran Vaibodha
- Released: 26 September 2025
- Recorded: 2024–2025
- Genre: Feature film soundtrack
- Language: Tamil
- Label: Sun Entertainment
- Producer: Ghibran Vaibodha

Ghibran Vaibodha chronology
JSK: Janaki V v/s State of Kerala (2025)	Rambo (2025)	Aaryan (2025)

Singles from Rambo
- 1. "Mayakkam Enna" Released: 7 October 2025; 2. "Girra Girrara" Released: 11 October 2025 (After the film's release)

The music and background score is composed by Ghibran Vaibodha, in his second collaboration with Arulnithi and M. Muthaiah after Dejavu (2022) and Kutti Puli (2013). The audio rights were acquired by Sun Entertainment. The first single titled "Mayakkam Enna" was released on 7 October 2025. The second single titled "Girra Girrara" was released on 11 October 2025, after the film's release. The entire soundtrack album was released on 15 October 2025, after the film's release.

All lyrics are written by Mohan Rajan.

Track listing
No.	Title	Singer(s)	Length
1.	"Mayakkam Enna"	Deepthi Suresh	3:02
2.	"Girra Girrara"	Narayanan Ravishankar, Sudharshan Ajay	3:06
3.	"Rambo Rambo"	Aravind Srinivas, Narayanan Ravishankar, Govind Prasad	3:37
4.	"Iraivan Manamae"	Kannaka Lakshimi, Keeravani	3:23
Total length:			13:08

== Release ==
Rambo was directly released via the streaming service Sun NXT on 10 October 2025. The film had its television premiere on Sun TV on 20 October 2025.

== Reception ==
Rambo received negative reviews.

Charishma Tatiparthi of Big TV rated the film 2.25/5 and wrote, "An earnest boxing drama with heart, but not enough heat to win the bout." Anusha Sundar of OTTPlay rated the film 1.5/5 stars and wrote, "It tries to blend kickboxing with drama but ends up tangled in illogical writing and weak storytelling. Despite flashes of humor, the film fails to land a solid punch emotionally". A critic from Cinema Vikatan gave the film a negative review, criticising the story for its lack of novelty and the screenplay for having predictable twists.

Suhas Sistu of The Hans India wrote, "Marketed as a gritty tale with kickboxing at its core, the film falls flat due to lazy writing, illogical situations, and painfully weak characterisation." Johnson of Puthiya Thalaimurai called it bland, criticising the boxing scenes as forced and included merely to justify the film's title.
