= Collector (2011 film) =

- Directed by: Anil C. Menon
- Produced by: V. V. Sajan; Abdul Azeez
- Starring: Suresh Gopi; Rajeev; Nedumudi Venu; Mohini; Yamini Verma; Balachandran Chullikkadu; Baburaj; Kollam Thulasi; Ambika
- Cinematography: Manoj Paramahamsa; Gunasekharan
- Edited by: V.T Sreejith
- Music by: Reghu Kumar
- Production company: A Qube
- Release date: 15 July 2011
- Running time: 160 minutes
- Country: India
- Language: Malayalam

Collector is a 2011 Indian Malayalam-language political action thriller film directed by Anil C. Menon, starring Suresh Gopi in the title role. The film takes a look at the contemporary social scene in the state.

== Plot ==
Avinash Varma is the District Collector of Ernakulam. He takes on several anti-social elements who rule the underworld of Kochi. Of them, Williams, who is a real estate businessman, is his biggest opponent. ACP Revathy, social activist Arundhati and a few honest and sincere government officers and the Chief Minister are there to support Avinash Varma. The City Police Commissioner, the Lady Mayor Sethulakshmi of Kochi Corporation, and a couple of corrupt ministers and officials are supporting the illegal activities of Williams. In the age-old battle between the 'Good' and the 'Evil', Avinash Varma wins as expected, and his truth and honesty are rewarded.

== Cast ==
- Suresh Gopi as Avinash Varma IAS, District Collector
- Rajeev as John Christopher, the main antagonist
- Nedumudi Venu as Mahendra Varma, Avinash's elder brother
- Yamini Sharma as ACP Revathy IPS
- Lakshmi Sharma as Gouri
- Mohini as Mayor Sethulakshmi
- Kaviyoor Ponnamma as Avinash's and Mahendran's mother
- Janardhanan as Chief Minister Balachandran Kurup
- Baburaj as George Mathew IPS, City Police Commissioner
- Adithya Menon as John Willams, Christopher's younger brother
- Maniyanpilla Raju as Sulaiman Mohammed
- Kalashala Babu as Minister Kurishumoottil Mathachan
- Subair as Krishnamohan
- Abu Salim as CI Xavier
- Anil Murali as CI Musthafa
- Biju Pappan as CI Soman
- Krishnakumar as Chandran
- Chali Pala as Adv. Habeeb Khan
- Sreehari as Prabhakaran
- Prof. Aliyar as Ninan Koshy
- T. P. Madhavan as Shankaran Namboothiri
- Sudheesh as Rameshan S Namboothiri
- Sajid Yahiya as Dilshen Mendisco
- Chemban Vinod Jose as Iqbal, a Terminator Squard team of Avinash

== Production ==
The film ran into financial troubles when its shooting was a mid way. Collector is the seventh directorial venture of Anil C. Menon.

== Reception ==
=== Critical response ===
Veeyen of Nowrunning.com gave a negative review and said, "Collector fits into the socio-political thriller genre in Malayalam films to the 'T'. The film tries to speak a lot, but the fact is that not many are in a mood to listen. For, we have seen it all" and gave 1.5 stars of 5.

Indiaglitz gave a favorable review and said, "The highlights of the movie are the brilliant production values starting from its awesome title graphics to excellent cinematography by Manoj Paramahamsa. Some of the dialogues in the former half and climax are indeed interesting, though that is not the case with the entire movie."

Sify said, "Collector is loud, formulaic and tailor made for those who are addicted to the age old good versus evil sagas. For those who get thrilled when the hero renders lines of dialogues to virtually everyone around and takes on a dozen hunks with sheer grit, this may be a fine film. For the rest of the world, this may not be such an exciting experience. The choice is yours!". Rediff wrote, "To sum up, Collector is just another Suresh Gopi film that will be appreciated by his fans, but has nothing new to offer".

== Soundtrack ==
The soundtrack features four songs composed by Reghu Kumar. The songs, as well as the choreography, received largely positive reviews. The songs managed to average the music charts in the initial weeks. This was the last work of Reghu Kumar, who died in 2014.

Song	Singer(s)	Duration
"Maayum Maaya"	K. J. Yesudas	5:39
"Raudhram"	Madhu Balakrishnan	4:19
"Rengi Nare"	Renjini Jose	5:20
