= Tony Joseph Pallivathukal =

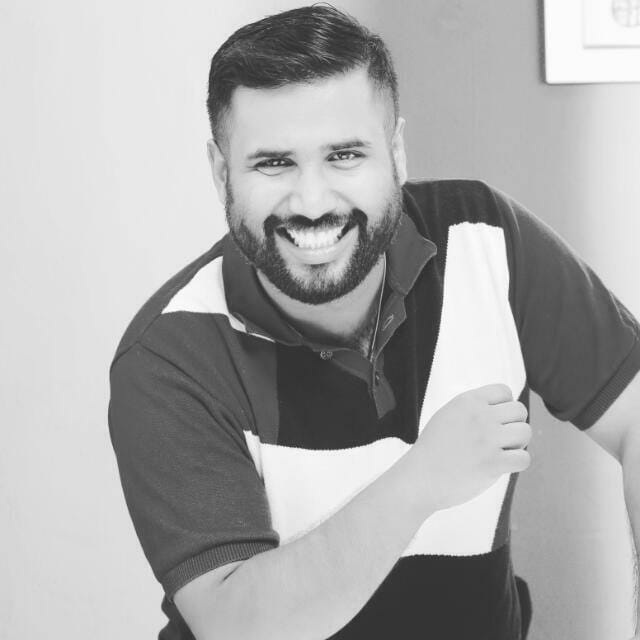

Background information
- Born: Kottayam, Kerala, India
- Origin: Kottayam, Kerala, India
- Genres: Film score
- Occupation: music director
- Years active: 2010–present

Tony Joseph Pallivathukal (often credited as Tony Joseph) is an Indian music director, music producer and publisher, sound engineer and singer. He has composed music for Malayalam films, advertising films and television commercial jingles in different languages.

He started his music career assisting music director Manikanth Kadri in Chennai. As a sound engineer, he has collaborated with several music directors in the South Indian Music Industry. He made his debut as a film score composer in 2018 with the movie Mohanlal, directed by Sajid Yahiya and starring Manju Warrier and Indrajith Sukumaran.

== Early life ==
Tony Joseph was born in Kottayam. He studied at Kristu Jyothi School & Good Shepherd School. He started learning carnatic music at the age of five, though he could learn only for few years. He then learned drums because of his interest in rhythm. Having done his graduation in Civil Engineering from the Rajiv Gandhi Institute of Technology, Kottayam, he was active in college union activities and college music band.

After working as Civil Engineer for couple of years in Bangalore, he then moved to Chennai to start his ambitious online music platform which never materialised. He then started working with popular music director Manikanth Kadri which became a turning point in his music career. Later moving back to Bangalore, he composed jingles for several advertising production houses.

== Career ==
=== Music ===
All the songs in the movie Mohanlal were significant hits and had crossed 2 Million mark in YouTube. Especially the song La La Laletta sung by Prarthana Indrajith which hit the 20 Million mark, was ideated by the director of the movie Sajid Yahiya. The song became a rage among Mohanlal fans thus making the song the maximum downloaded song in online platforms and ringback tones. Prarthana Indrajith was appreciated well for her rendition. Karthik, Nithya Menen & Indrajith Sukumaran sang other songs. Nithya Menen considers her song in the movie as her favourite and she has rendered till date.

His upcoming release is Sakalakala Vallabha starring Rishi.

== Filmography ==
Year	Film	Language			
Year	Film	Language	2018	Mohanlal	Malayalam
