= Dummy Tappasu =

2015 Indian film by O. S. Ravi

- Theatrical release poster
- Directed by: O. S. Ravi
- Produced by: S Raju
- Starring: Praveen Prem; Ramya Pandian
- Cinematography: Kannan.K
- Edited by: Ahamed .S.P
- Music by: Deva
- Production company: Yacht Ads
- Release date: 2 October 2015
- Country: India
- Language: Tamil

Dummy Tappasu (transl. Dummy fire cracker) (Note: Tappasu means fire cracker in Madras Bashai.) is a 2015 Indian Tamil-language romantic comedy film directed by O. S. Ravi. The film stars Malayalam actor Praveen Prem and debutante Ramya Pandian.

== Synopsis ==
An obese man, living in the slums of Chennai, comes across a series of situations that change his perception towards life and love.

== Cast ==
- Praveen Prem as Shree
- Ramya Pandian as Soumya
- John Vijay
- Singamuthu as rowdy
- Amirthalingam
- Mime Gopi
- Uma
- Niranjan Venky
- Jenny
- Bonda Mani

== Production ==
Malayalam comedian Praveen Prem was signed to play the lead role as the film required a plump man to play the lead role. The film highlights the life in the slums of Chennai. The film began production under the title Tapsa. Deva was brought in to compose the music. A few scenes were shot in black and white.

== Soundtrack ==
The songs were composed by Deva.

- "Adiayae Flowerae" – Mukesh Mohamed
- "Anju Pathu Kadanai" – Deva
- "Enna Idhu Vayasu" – Lakshmi Chandru
- "Yenda En Magane" – Kavitha Gopi

== Reception ==
Maalai Malar praised the cinematography and performances of the lead cast, while criticising the lack of interesting scenes.
