= Sajid Yahiya =

Indian director and actor

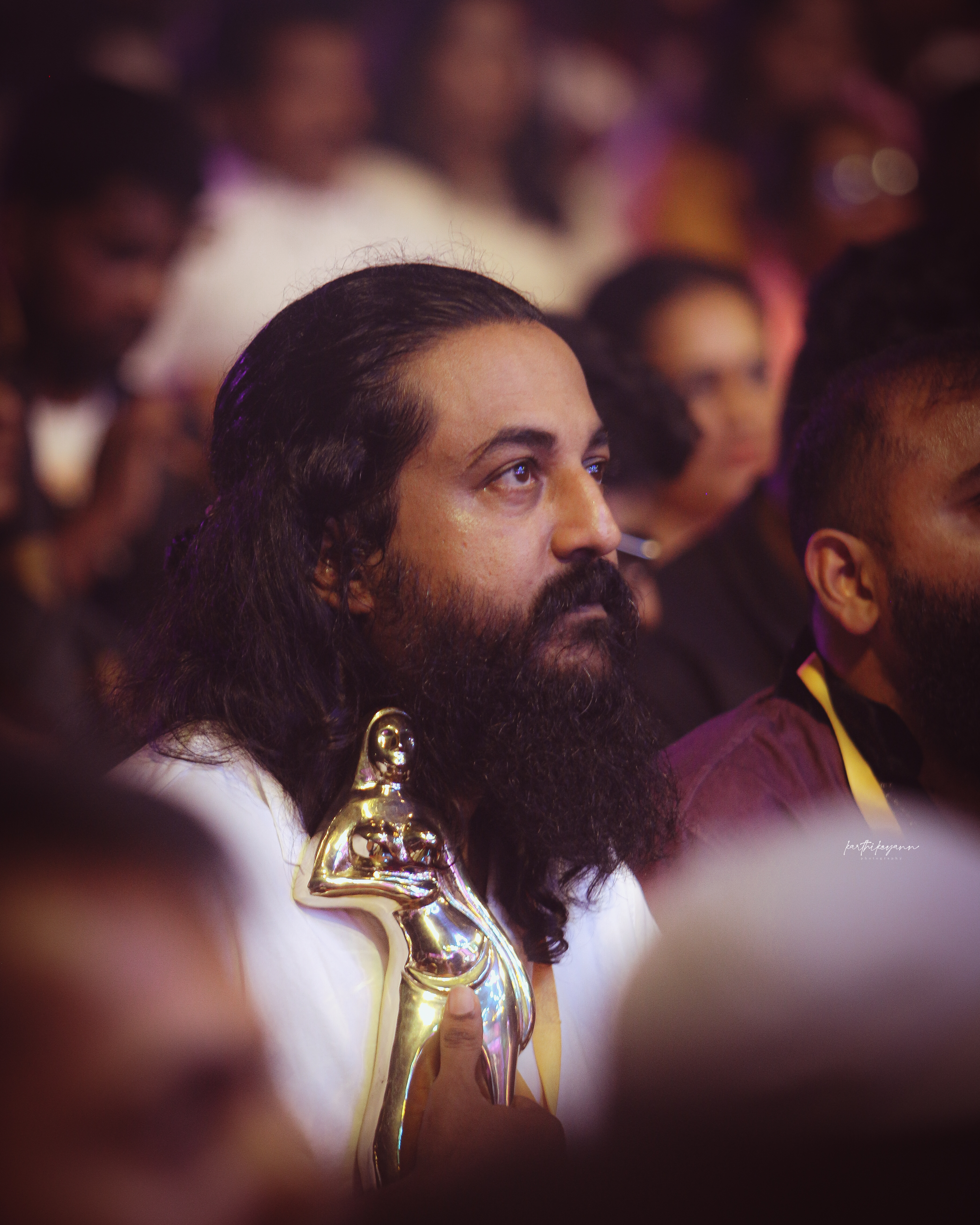
- Born: 20 December 1983 (age 42); Alappuzha, Kerala, India
- Occupations: Actor; director; producer
- Years active: 2009–present

Sajid Yahiya (born 20 December 1984) is an Indian film director, actor, producer and music composer who works in Malayalam cinema. He made his directorial debut in 2016 with the film IDI - Inspector Dawood Ibrahim. He is the founder of a film production company, CP Film Productions.

Sajid Yahiya is known for his roles in the films Collector, Friday and Bangalore Days. He also directed the films IDI – Inspector Dawood Ibrahim (2016), Mohanlal (2018) and Qalb (2020).

== Career ==
He made his acting debut in Collector directed by Anil C. Menon. His second film, Friday. Apart from acting he was also the executive producer of the film. He was then approached by Roopesh Peethambaran to play a role in Theevram. After this, he acted on Kaashh, Arikil Oraal, and Amen. Other notable films Include Pakida and Bangalore Days. He made his directorial debut in 2016 through the action comedy film IDI - Inspector Dawood Ibrahim. He also directed Mohanlal starring Manju Warrier in 2018, which was a tribute to actor Mohanlal. The song ‘Laletta’ composed by Tony Joseph from the film was a major hit.

In 2019, the movie "Qalb" was announced featuring Shane Nigam, Siddique, and Lena in leading roles. However, due to various reasons, Shane Nigam was subsequently removed from the film. The production of the movie is now being backed by Vijay Babu's Friday Film House, with a bunch of newcomers set to star in key roles. The story has been written by Sajid and is described as a romantic tale set against the beautiful backdrop of Alappuzha beach.

In 2021, he produced "Pallotty 90's Kids," a nostalgic drama presented by Lijo Jose Pellissery, directed by debutant Jithin Raj under the banner of Cinema Pranthan Film Productions. The movie features Master Davinci Santhosh and Master Neeraj Krishna in lead roles, and popular young actors Arjun Ashokan and Balu Varghese. Additionally, the star cast also includes Saiju Kurup, Niranjana Anoop, and Dinesh Prabhakar. The film has been selected for the Bangalore International Film Festival.

He announced his next project, "Arikomban - The Most Powerful Force on Earth is Justice", which tells the eventful story of a tusker who lost his mother at the age of two. The movie was set to commence filming in October 2023, with Sigiriya, Sri Lanka serving as the primary shooting location and Chinnakanal, Idukki also featuring in certain parts of the film. The movie will be produced by Badusha Cinemas and Pen and Paper Creations, with the script penned by Suhail M Koya.

== Filmography ==
Year	Title	Role	Notes
2011	Collector	Williams	
2012	Friday	Sobichan	Also executive producer
2012	Theevram	Emmanuel	
2012	Kaashh		
2013	Arikil Oraal	Manu	
2013	Amen	Barber Kumaaran	
2013	Zachariayude Garbhinikal	Veyil Chilla - Singer	
2014	Pakida	Pauly	
2014	Bangalore Days	Sammy	
2015	Kumbasaram		
2015	Double Barrel	Chaplly	
2016	Bangalore Naatkal	Sammy	Tamil film
2016	Darvinte Parinamam	Dickson	
2016	IDI - Inspector Dawood Ibrahim		Directorial debut
2016	Pokkiri Simon	Singam Suni	
2018	Mohanlal		Director
2019	Kodathi Samaksham Balan Vakeel	Informer	
2021	Pallotty 90's kids		Producer
2023	Arikomban		Director
2024	Qalb		Director and Writer

== Awards ==
He won the 53rd Kerala State Film Awards for the movie he produced, Pallotty 90's Kids, under the category of Best Children's Film.
