= Friday (2012 film) =

2012 film by Lijin Jose

- Film poster
- Directed by: Lijin Jose
- Written by: Najeem Koya
- Produced by: Sandra Thomas; Thomas Joseph Pattathanam
- Starring: Fahadh Faasil; Nedumudi Venu; Nimisha Suresh; Tini Tom; Ann Augustine; Vijayaraghavan; Seema G. Nair; Prakash Bare; Asha Sarath; Manesh Kumar
- Cinematography: Jomon Thomas
- Edited by: Manoj
- Music by: Rex Vijayan
- Production company: Innovative Film Concepts
- Distributed by: Achu & Achu's Creations
- Release date: 18 August 2012
- Running time: 103 minutes
- Country: India
- Language: Malayalam

Friday is a 2012 Indian Malayalam-language drama thriller film directed by Lijin Jose (in his directorial debut). starring Fahadh Faasil and Ann Augustine. Nedumudi Venu, Vijayaraghavan, and Tini Tom appear in supporting roles. Produced by Sandra Thomas and Thomas Joseph Pattathanam under the banner of Innovative Film Concepts, the film is set and filmed in Alappuzha. It was released on 18 August 2012 to positive reviews from critics. Carrying a tag of One Day-Many Stories, the film has a multi-narrative aspect and is woven in the format of a hyperlink cinema.

== Plot ==
The film tells the life stories of many people who arrive into a town on Friday 11 November 2011 (11–11–11) to mess up their life into confusing proportions.

Balu, an auto-rickshaw driver by profession, lives by taking it on daily rent. He is least happy with the way the day has started off. He has just learned that a jack fruit has fallen over the roof of his house. We see the poor condition he lives in as he does not have the money to repair the roof of his house.

Out in the city, Aswathy is busy shopping for her wedding. Accompanied by her grandfather, sister and mom, she is seen quite busy attending the phone calls of her beau Jayakrishnan who is incidentally in the city as well.

Muneer is the son of the auto-rickshaw owner that Balu runs. He is a typical young college student who refuses to do anything that his mother wishes him to do. Muneer and his girlfriend Jincy decide to head over to the beach, as a holiday has been declared for the college.

A fully pregnant beggar woman roams the city with hopes of finding a place where she could deliver her baby. Another mother, whose daughter in law has just delivered a baby, has to head back home with the newborn, as the hospital decides to discharge her all on a sudden, due to wanting of beds.

Arun and Parvathy, a childless couple, also lands in Alappuzha on the same day, to adopt a child. They are quite in a hurry and have to leave back to Bangalore by evening, and when the orphanage officials demand a certificate to complete the adoption procedures, they find themselves in a fix.

The events start with boat ride where in almost all of the people involved in this plot (except for Balu and Jayakrishnan) take part or later take part. The boat driver notices a problem due to a hole in the hull and takes the boat to the repair shed. But the supervisor at the repair shop is an arrogant drunkard due to which the repair work is done in a negligent manner. Meanwhile, Aswathy and family hires Balu's auto to go to a shop and Aswathy's grandfather forgets a bag containing gold and money which was meant for the wedding of Aswathy. Balu finds the bag in the auto, which he keeps it for himself. Aswathy's grandfather Purushan seeks the help of Circle Inspector (CI)of Police. Meanwhile, Muneer and Jincy are taken to the police station on the basis of breach of morality in public place and had to wait at the police station until CI (CI and Purushan goes in search of Balu)arrives late in the evening.

On seeing another woman and her daughter's plight at the hospital Dinesh Prabhakar decides to help them by taking them to the Medical College Hospital. But on the way, the lady dies and he takes them to their home for the last rites. Arun and Parvathy gets conned by the orphanage official and a man who introduces himself as a priest and cheats them of some money for a forged medical certificate which were required to complete the adoption process. Due to a rethinking, Balu decides to give the gold and cash back and heads to the police station, where in he meets Purushan and family and hands over the gold and cash. Since due to lack of bed, Seema G Nair's daughter in law and the newborn had to be discharged from the hospital and they decide to head home.

Now all the people involved in the plot gets into the boat (which was not properly repaired) which in the middle of lake sinks. All but Muneer who saves the newborn baby survives.

== Cast ==
- Fahadh Faasil as Balu
- Nedumudi Venu as Purushothaman
- Nimisha Suresh as Aswathy
- Tini Tom as Jayakrishnan
- Asha Sharath as Parvathy
- Narayanankutty
- Edavela Babu
- Ann Augustine as Jincy
- Vijayaraghavan as police officer
- Seema G. Nair
- Bindu Murali as Aswathy's mother
- Prakash Bare as Arun
- Anoop Sankar
- Gayathri as Muneer's mother
- Sudheer Karamana

== Production and release ==
The film has been scripted by Najeem Koya, who has scripted Apoorvaragam previously. The film was mostly shot in Alappuzha where the film is set. The shoot was almost over in May 2012 and the film was expected to be on theaters by June. Since the film has several story threads and thus a lot of actors, the editing and post-production work took time, and the release was pushed to 18 August.

== Critical reception ==
Friday released on 18 August 2012, and received mixed reviews. Rating the film 2.5 out of 5, Veeyen of Nowrunning stated "'Friday', more than everything else, presents an enterprising director, who has an eye for fine cinema. With a little more compactness and finesse, it could have turned out even better; as such, it remains a fine watch." Oneindia.in gave 4 out of 5 ratings and said that Friday "is a well-woven neatly scripted movie with minimal loopholes." The Times of India praised its direction and script. Metromatinee.com also wrote a positive review and gave a verdict "Don't Miss This". Paresh C. Palicha of Rediff.com wrote that the film is "passable as there seems to be an overdose of stories of a similar kind."

== Soundtrack ==
"Composed by Roby Abraham, the music album comprises four tracks penned by Beeyar Prasad with the background music of Rex Vijayan. The music has been released worldwide by Universal Music India on CDs, mobile and digital platforms. ."
