= Don Max (film editor) =

Indian film director and editor

- Born: 16 November 1980 (age 45); Anickadu, Kerala, India
- Occupations: Film editor; director

Don Max is an Indian film director and editor who works mainly in Malayalam cinema along with Tamil and Telugu language films. He is considered one of the leading contemporary film editors in the Malayalam film industry, and has introduced several new editing techniques into the regional films.

== Early life ==
Don Max was born on 16 November 1980 in Mundakayam, Kottayam District, Kerala, as the eldest child of K. L. Varghese, a former bank manager at SBT, and T. V. Chinamma, who was a teacher in Malayalam at St. Thomas High School in Anikkad. He was born on the same day the Malayalam action star Jayan died. After spending his first seven years in the Idukki district, his family shifted to Pallickathode, Anickad. He grew up in the town and studied at St. Thomas, Anickad. He later studied his pre-degree education at St. Dominic College in Kanjirapilly, before graduating with a Bachelor of Arts degree from St. Thomas College, Palai. He later did a Diploma in Multimedia and Animation at Arena Animations, Bangalore and specialized in Compositing and Animation.

== Career ==
Beginning his career as an editor for ad films and television channels, Don initially focussed on animation, before realising that he would have a more fulfilling career as an editor the possibilities in editing. He joined Ketan Mehta’s Institute and then worked in the Prime Time channel in Dubai, before beginning working as an editor for the Malayalam channel, Kairali.

Don subsequently did trailers for more than fifty films, before debuting as a senior editor through Shaji Kailas’s The Tiger (2005). Don experimented with doing editing at the location, becoming one of the first Malayalam editors to do so, while he also did editing for V. K. Prakash’s Moonnamathoral (2006), the first digital cinema in Malayalam.

He simultaneously worked on Tamil film projects and worked on big budget films such as Aadhavan (2009), Sura (2010) and Ponnar Shankar (2011). Don also worked on Jilla (2014). In late 2014, he began his first directorial venture with actor Anoop Menon in the lead role, and released his debut movie 10 Kalpanakal in 25 November 2016.

== Filmography ==
Year	Title	Language	Notes
2005	The Tiger	Malayalam	
2006	Baba Kalyani	Malayalam	
2006	Chinthamani Kolacase	Malayalam	
2007	Time	Malayalam	
2007	Chotta Mumbai	Malayalam	
2007	Ali Bhai	Malayalam	
2007	Moonnamathoral	Malayalam	
2007	Hello	Malayalam	
2007	Paradesi	Malayalam	
2008	Roudram	Malayalam	
2008	Annan Thambi	Malayalam	
2008	Kuruvi	Tamil	
2008	Thalappavu	Malayalam	
2008	Ellam Avan Seyal	Tamil	
2008	Silambattam	Tamil	
2009	Satrumun Kidaitha Thagaval	Tamil	
2009	Black Dalia	Malayalam	
2009	Aadhavan	Tamil	
2010	Drona 2010	Malayalam	
2010	Jaggubhai	Tamil	
2010	Sura	Tamil	
2010	Inidhu Inidhu	Tamil	
2010	3 Char Sau Bees	Malayalam	
2010	Kanyakumari Express	Malayalam	
2010	Best Actor	Malayalam	
2010	Kandahar	Malayalam	
2011	China Town	Malayalam	
2011	Sankarankovil	Tamil	
2011	Manushyamrugam	Malayalam	
2011	Ponnar Shankar	Tamil	
2011	Chaappa Kurishu	Malayalam	
2011	Uppukandam Brothers Back in Action	Malayalam	
2011	Puli Vesham	Tamil	
2011	Mambattiyan	Tamil	
2012	Simhasanam	Malayalam	
2012	Chaarulatha	Tamil/Kannada	
2012	Madirasi	Malayalam	
2012	Karmayodha	Malayalam	
2013	Ente	Malayalam	
2013	Entry	Malayalam	
2013	ABCD: American-Born Confused Desi	Malayalam	
2013	10:30 am Local Call	Malayalam	
2013	Bangles	Malayalam	
2014	Jilla	Tamil	
2014	Naa Bangaaru Talli	Telugu/Malayalam	
2014	100 Degree Celsius	Malayalam	
2016	Monsoon Mangoes	Malayalam	
2016	Saahasam	Tamil	
2016	10 Kalpanakal	Malayalam	Directorial debut
2023	Alone	Malayalam	
2025	Aghosham †	Malayalam	
