= Golam (2024 film) =

2024 Indian film

- Theatrical release poster
- Directed by: Samjad
- Written by: Praveen Viswanath; Samjad
- Produced by: Anne Sajeev; Sajeev P. K.
- Starring: Ranjith Sajeev; Dileesh Pothan; Sunny Wayne; Alencier Ley Lopez; Siddique
- Cinematography: Vijay
- Edited by: Mahesh Bhuvanend
- Music by: Aby Salvin Thomas
- Production company: Fragrant Nature Film Creations
- Distributed by: Fragrant Nature Film Creations; Sree Priya Combines
- Release date: 7 June 2024
- Running time: 120 minutes
- Country: India
- Language: Malayalam

Golam (transl. Sphere) is a 2024 Indian Malayalam-language police procedural thriller film co-written and directed by Samjad (in his directorial debut). The film stars Ranjith Sajeev, Sunny Wayne, Dileesh Pothan, Alencier Ley Lopez, and Siddique.

In its year-end report, the Kerala Film Chamber of Commerce classified Golam as an "average hit" based on box office collections.

== Plot ==
Isaac John, the MD of V-Tech Company, is found dead inside the restroom at his office with the door locked from the inside. The police are called in and the investigation begins. Though initially presumed to be a case of accidental death from a head injury sustained during a slip and fall, and more apparently so with no signs of forced entry or confrontation on the body or the surroundings, his instincts cause ASP Sandeep to suspect murder. Isaac is also found to have been suffering from COPD.

Police suspect Gibson George, Isaac's business partner. All the employees present at the time of the death are questioned individually. Gibson upon questioning reveals that according to Isaac's will, after Isaac's death, his USA-based brother, Evan, would inherit all his business, ruling out a possible motive. One of the employees is found carrying sleeping pills in her bag. Upon further follow up supplemented by the location details on their phones, it is found out that majority of the employees were patients of Dr. Kuriakose, a neuropsychiatrist-neurosurgeon, who Sandeep is acquainted with.

Though he initially denies knowledge of the company or its employees, Dr. Kuriakose later reveals that one of the employees, Meera, who was his wife, Dr. Rachel's patient while pregnant, was under his treatment for depression, after suffering an inexplicable stillbirth. On further evaluation, a sort of foreign content, mutagens, capable of altering the DNA, was found in her blood. Strikingly, the same was isolated from the blood samples of two other employees as well, who had consulted him with complaints of headaches and sleeplessness. As per his instruction, more employees with some sort of health issue were brought to him by the two. The water and snacks provided at the office were also tested chemically.

Isaac was found to be the co-founder of V-Pharma Pharmaceuticals. Some files secretly extracted from Isaac's PC were brought to the doctor by the employees, including a blue print of the office punching machine. After examining and correlating the data available, he had concluded that the pharmaceutical company was working on an antidote, a futuristic vaccine for HMV (Human Mutagen Virus), aka Red Virus, (with the objective of creating a supply and demand situation) and that the employees were his guinea pigs with the antidote being given to them through snacks and water provided by the company. They were being monitored and evaluated regularly through the DNA extracting punching machine. The antidote being tested on them was unfiltered and only in its first stage leaving the employees with permanent health issues and consequent emotional distress. The enraged victims had sworn vengeance, as they knew Isaac could easily escape law, thanks to his wealth and connections. They, however, never disclosed their plans to the doctor.

Sandeep after examining the CCTV footages from their office deduces their method of murder. Each of the employees had collectively and step by step, participated in the same, except Rajiv. Their plan involved directing Isaac to his restroom to wash off a deliberate coffee spill from his clothes, where he was ensured to be locked in and made to succumb to carbon dioxide poisoning, with any cries for help drowned out by an operating vacuum cleaner.

Sandeep reports the case to be an accidental death, as his conscience deems them not guilty. It is revealed that Gibson, also a biochemical scientist, is involved in the illegal and unethical activities of V-Pharma as well. Sandeep, with the information obtained from Dr. Kuriakose, sets out to investigate their lab. In the end, Gibson, now MD of V-Tech, is shown occupying the late Isaac's cabin with the employees eyeing him testily.

== Cast ==
- Ranjith Sajeev as ASP Sandeep Krishnan IPS, the investigating officer
- Sunny Wayne as Gibson George
- Dileesh Pothan as Isaac John
- Chinnu Chandni as Meera
- Alencier Ley Lopez as CI Abdul Raheem
- Siddique as Psychiatrist Dr.Kuriakose Chemmanam
- Srikant Murali as City Police Commissioner Babu Thomas IPS
- Ansal Palluruthy as Rajeev KV
- Priya Sreejith as CPO Nimmy George
- Asha Madathil as Dr. Sherly
- Rini K Rajan as Thressiamma
- Sudhi Kozhikode as SI Noushad
- Praveen Viswanath as Sebastian
- Kaarthik Shankar as Albert
- Sanjay as Bibeesh
- Pranav Ekaa as Aravind
- Anu Anand as Arun
- Ala S Nayana as Rani
- Remadevi as Sindhu
- Unni Deshaposhini as Sathyan
- Vijaya Sadan as Dr.Rachel
- Sheethal Joseph as Neena
- Gayathri Satheesh as Neelima
- Unni Vaikom as ASI Harikumar

== Release ==
Golam was released in theatres on 7 June 2024.

=== Box office ===
In its year-end report, the Kerala Film Chamber of Commerce classified Golam as an "average hit" among the films that generated profits for producers based solely on box office collections.

=== Critical reaction ===
Nelki Naresh Kumar of Hindustan Times concluded that "Golam is impressive in terms of concept and screenplay". Critic from Asianet News wrote that the film has maintained the mystery and anticipation for a police investigation thriller, staying true to its genre. Seena Antony of Manorama Online praised the direction, stating that the fast-paced narration is the strength of the film and that the director were able to maintain the tension and intensity. Ajmal N. S. of Mathrubhumi called it a "decent thriller" and that the film has been made in an intriguing manner. Princy Alexander of Onmanorama called it an "intriguing whodunnit", however, at times, the writing is "far-fetched", hindering the "smooth progress".

Gayathri Krishna of OTT Play rated 3 in a scale of 5, and said that "a carefully written script elevates the Ranjith Sajeev-starrer to a one-time watch". Rohit Panikker of Times Now rated 3 out of 5 stars, calling it "a film that offers a predictable yet satisfactory pay off to a gripping investigation. The film begins well, has its hiccups, yet delivers in the end with a strong narration". Vivek Santhosh of The New Indian Express rated 2.5 out of 5 called it a "passable whodunit", adding that "what this film lacks in effective writing and a compelling lead actor is compensated to some extent by debutant Samjad's slick narration".

== Sequel ==
In an interview, director Samjad P S confirmed that Golam was conceived as a two-part story. He stated that the script was originally written as a single narrative and later divided into two, with the second installment already in the planning stages. He added that the sequel "will be more intense" and aims to "push boundaries" beyond the first film.
