= Lijin Jose =

Indian film director

- Born: May 1, 1978 (age 48); Kerala, India
- Occupation: Film director
- Years active: 2010-present

Lijin Jose is a Malayalam film director with two feature films and one documentary to his credit. His debut movie was Friday starring Fahad Fazil. He is also the founder of Every Dog has its Day Productions (EDHID) and Make My Theatre. He studied filmmaking from C-DIT. His diploma project film, Night Is Difficult to Cut won the best student film award by UGC-CEC. He worked as a paneled director at C-DIT where he made many documentaries, ad films and public awareness films. Before starting his film career, he also worked as an assistant director with filmmakers V. K. Prakash, T. K. Rajeev Kumar and Deepu Karunakaran

== Personal life ==
Lijin was born in Alappuzha, Kerala, India. He did his PG masters in English language and literature from the University of Kerala. He also has a PG diploma in filmmaking from Centre for Development of Imaging Technology (C-DIT).

== Career ==
Lijin Started his film career as an assistant director in 2003. He assisted Ivar, The Journey, Chacko Randaaman, Winter (2004 film) and Seetha Kalyanam. His first film was Friday starring Fahad Fazil and Ann Augustine. He directed Law Point starring Kunchako Boban and Namitha Pramod soon after and focused on making a documentary on the veteran filmmaker, K.G George on his life and career. 8½ Intercuts: Life and Films of K.G. George

== Awards and nominations ==
8½ Intercuts: Life and Films of K.G. George (2017) Documentary

(Indian Panorama, International Film Festival of India (IFFI), International Documentary Short Film Festival of India (IDSFFK), Signs International Film Festival, Prisma International Film Festival)

Unfriend (2014) Malayalam short film

(Official Selection International Documentary Short Film Festival of India (IDSFFK), Signs International Film Festival, Shimla International Film Festival)

Friday (2012) Malayalam feature film

(Official Selection, International Film Festival of Kerala)

Conditions Apply (2010) Malayalam short film

Official Selection-International Documentary Short Film Festival of India (IDSFFK), Signs International Film Festival

Night Is Difficult To Cut (2001) Short film

Best Student Film award by UGC- CEC

== Filmography ==
Year	Movie	Notes
2012	Friday	Directorial debut
2014	Law Point	
2024	Her	
TBA	Chera (film)	

=== Short films ===
Year	Movie	Notes
2010	Conditions Apply	
2014	Unfriend	
2017	8½ Intercuts: Life and Films of K.G. George	Documentary Film
