= Alapad =

Village in Kerala, India

Alapad is a mid-land village in the Thrissur District of the Indian state Kerala.

== Location ==
Alapad is situated on the Western side of Thrissur corporation. The village is between Thrissur and Triprayar and has an approximate distance of 14 km and 9 km respectively.

- PIN: 680641
- Alapad village belongs to Thrissur Taluk.
- Grama Panchayat: Chazhur.
- Legislative Constituency: Nattika.
- Parliament Constituency: Thrissur.

== Health and Education ==
There is a Community Health Center and a Government Lower Primary School at Alapad.

== Temples ==
The village is home to many temples, some are owned exclusively by some aristocratic families. They celebrate the festivals with Pooram or Thottam which are attended by all people irrespective of religion and caste. There are Ezhavas, Nairs, Pulayar and Vettuvan are the main Hindu community. There is a Roman Catholic Church in the main area called Labour Corner. Alapad is a village of farmers, employees in the Middle East and toddy tappers.
