= List of Malayalam songs recorded by Shweta Mohan =

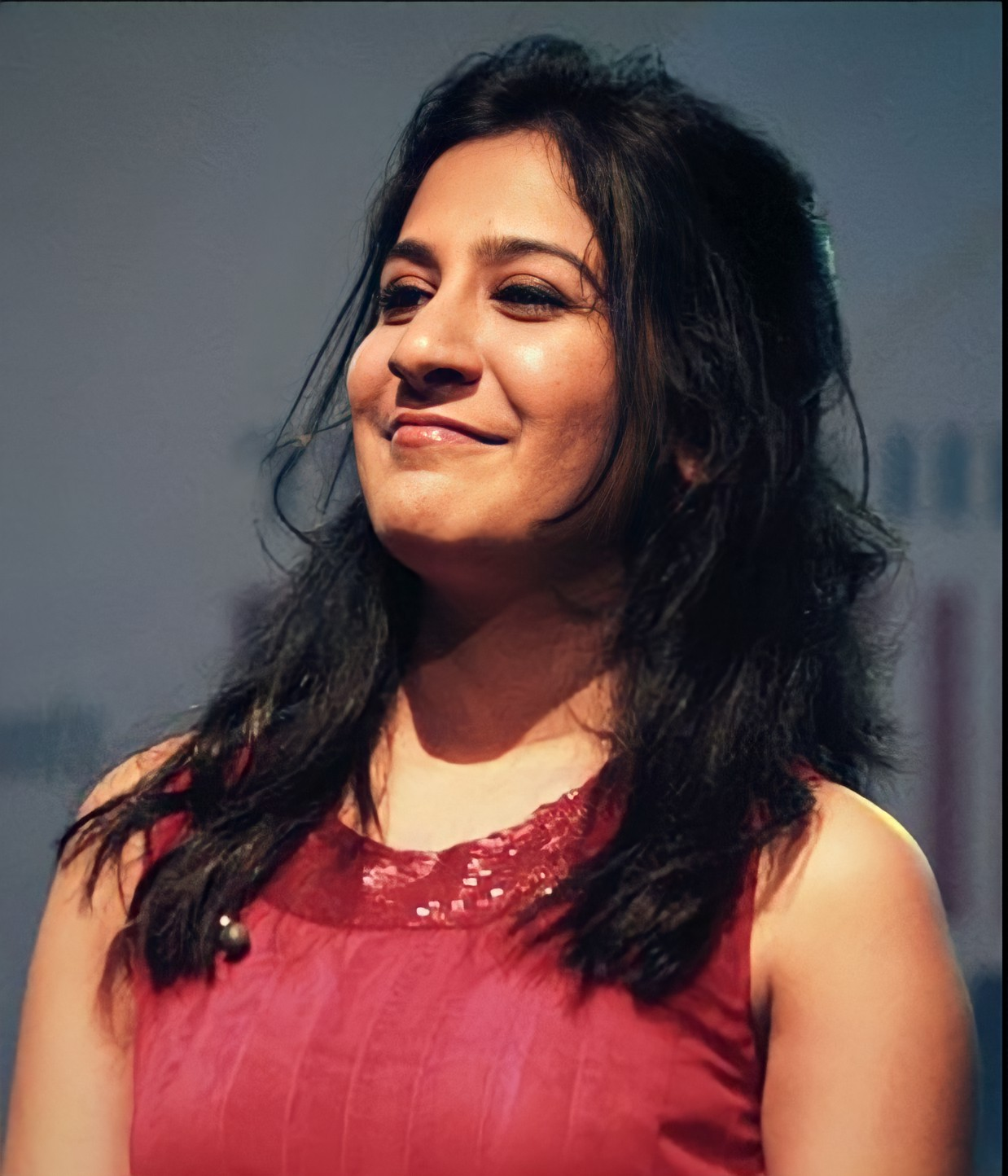

Shweta Mohan (born 19 November 1985) is an Indian playback singer. She has received four Filmfare Awards South for Best Female Playback Singer, one Kerala State Film Awards and one Tamil Nadu State Film Awards. She has recorded songs for film music and albums in all the four South Indian languages namely, Malayalam, Tamil, Telugu, Kannada along with the Hindi language and has established herself as a leading playback singer of South Indian cinema. Some of her inspirations are Sujatha Mohan (her mother), K.S. Chitra and Lata Mangeshkar.

== Film songs ==
=== 2005 ===
Film	No	Song	Composer(s)	Lyricist(s)	Co-artist(s)
By the People	1	"Malare"	Pravin Mani	Kaithapram Damodaran Namboothiri	Benny Dayal, Bhargavi, Anaitha Nair, Arjun Sasi
By the People	2	"Asthale"	Pravin Mani	Kaithapram Damodaran Namboothiri	Benny Dayal, Bhargavi, Anaitha Nair, Arjun Sasi
By the People	3	"Vasco"	Pravin Mani	Kaithapram Damodaran Namboothiri	Benny Dayal, Bhargavi, Anaitha Nair, Arjun Sasi
By the People	4	"Rock me"	Pravin Mani	Kaithapram Damodaran Namboothiri	Benny Dayal, Bhargavi, Anaitha Nair, Arjun Sasi
By the People	5	"Nana"	Pravin Mani	Kaithapram Damodaran Namboothiri	Benny Dayal, Bhargavi, Anaitha Nair, Arjun Sasi
By the People	6	"Oh Laila"	Pravin Mani	Kaithapram Damodaran Namboothiri	Benny Dayal, Bhargavi, Anaitha Nair, Arjun Sasi
By the People	7	"Malare [Extend]"	Pravin Mani	Kaithapram Damodaran Namboothiri	Benny Dayal, Bhargavi, Anaitha Nair, Arjun Sasi

=== 2006 ===
Film	No	Song	Composer(s)	Lyricist(s)	Co-artist(s)
Lion	8	"Sundari"	Deepak Dev	Kaithapram Damodaran Namboothiri	Udit Narayan
Lion	9	"Sundari" (Hip Pop Mix)	Deepak Dev	Kaithapram Damodaran Namboothiri	Udit Narayan

=== 2007 ===
Film	No	Song	Composer(s)	Lyricist(s)	Co-artist(s)
Vinodayathra	10	"Mandarapoo"	Ilayaraaja	Vayalar Sarathchandra Varma	Madhu Balakrishnan
Panthaya Kozhi	11	"Sundariye"	Alex Paul	Vayalar Sarathchandra Varma	Vidhu Prathap
Hello	12	"Hello"(Duet)	Alex Paul	Vayalar Sarathchandra Varma	Vidhu Prathap
Hello	13	"Hello"(Female)	Alex Paul	Vayalar Sarathchandra Varma	
Romeo	14	"Kilichundan"(Duet)	Alex Paul	Vayalar Sarathchandra Varma	Afsal
Romeo	15	"Kilichundan"(Female)	Alex Paul	Vayalar Sarathchandra Varma	
Nivedyam	16	"Alaipayuthe"	M. Jayachandran	Traditional	K Krishnakumar
Nivedyam	17	"Lalithavalanga"	M. Jayachandran	Traditional	Sudeep Kumar
Nivedyam	18	"Kolakkuzhal"	M. Jayachandran	A K Lohithadas	Vijay Yesudas
Kadha Parayumbol	19	"Mambulli"	M. Jayachandran	Gireesh Puthanchery	Vineeth Sreenivasan
Goal	20	"Enthaninne"	Vidyasagar	Gireesh Puthanchery	V Devanand
Ore Kadal	21	"Yamuna"	Ouseppachan	Gireesh Puthanchery	
July 4	22	"Oruvakku"(Duet)	Ouseppachan	Ranjan	Vineeth Sreenivasan
July 4	23	"Oruvakku"(Female)	Ouseppachan	Ranjan	

=== 2008 ===
Film	No	Song	Composer(s)	Lyricist(s)	Co-artist(s)
Novel	24	"Kuyile Poonkuyile"	M Jayachandran	East Coast Vijayan	
Sulthan	25	"Rakkuyil Koottukari"	M Jayachandran	A K Lohithadas	Vijay Yesudas
Madambi	26	"Ammamazha"(Female)	M Jayachandran	Gireesh Puthanchery	
De Ingottu Nokkiye	27	"Pathirakkuyil"	M Jayachandran	Gireesh Puthanchery	Vijay Yesudas
Kurukshetra	28	"Oru Yathra"(Female)	Siddharth Vipin	Gireesh Puthanchery	
Kurukshetra	29	"Oru Yathra"(Duet)	Siddharth Vipin	Gireesh Puthanchery	M G Sreekumar
Innathe Chintha Vishayam	30	"Manassiloru"	Ilayaraja	Gireesh Puthanchery	Madhu Balakrishnan
Shakespeare M.A. Malayalam	31	"Akkam Pakkam"(Female)	Mohan Sithara	Anil Panachooran	
Minnaminnikoottam	33	"Mizhithammil"(Duet)	Bijibal	Anil Panachooran	Ranjith
Minnaminnikoottam	34	"Mizhithammil"(Female)	Bijibal	Anil Panachooran	
College Kumaran	35	"Kanakuyilin"(Female)	Ouseppachan	Shibu Chakravarthy	
Gulmohar	36	"Oru Nal"	Johnson	O. N. V. Kurup	Vijay Yesudas
Thirakkatha	37	"Palapoovithalil"	Sharreth	Rafeeq Ahammed	KK Nishad
Pachamarathanalil	38	"Chithra Thooval"	Alphons Joseph	Vayalar Sarathchandra Varma	Sayanora Philip

=== 2009 ===
Film	No	Song	Composer(s)	Lyricist(s)	Co-artist(s)
Hailesa	39	"Ponnoda Kuzhalin"(Duet)	Ouseppachan	Unknown	Sudeep Kumar
Moz & Cat	40	"Thottal Pookkum"	Ouseppachan	Kaithapram Damodaran Namboothiri	
Robinhood	41	"Priyanu Mathram"	M Jayachandran	Kaithapram Damodaran Namboothiri	Vijay Yesudas
Chemistry	42	"Vandematharam"	M Jayachandran	Bichu Thirumala	Alex Kayyalaykkal, TT Sainoj, Chorus
Orkkuka Vallappozhum	43	"Eatho January Maasam"(Female)	M Jayachandran	Gireesh Puthanchery	
Banaras	44	"Koovaramkili"	M Jayachandran	Gireesh Puthanchery	Vijay Yesudas
Ee Pattanathil Bhootham	45	"Aro Nilavay"	Shaan Rahman	Gireesh Puthanchery	Vineeth Sreenivasan
Love In Singapore	46	"RagaMadhu"(Duet)	Suresh Peters	Santhosh Varma	Afsal
Love In Singapore	47	"RagaMadhu"(Female)	Suresh Peters	Santhosh Varma	
Currency	48	"Akale Neelambari"(Female)	Siddharth Vipin	Santhosh Varma	
Daddy Cool	49	"Daddy My Daddy"	Bijibal	Santhosh Varma	Adithya Krishna, Amrutha Krishna, Anju Bhaskaran, Sanand Unnikrishnan
Swantham Lekhakan	50	"Cheruthinkal"	Bijibal	Anil Panachooran	Madhu Balakrishnan
Bhagyadevatha	51	"Allipoove"	Ilayaraja	Vayalar Sarathchandra Varma	Vijay Yesudas
Ajantha	52	"Veykkeda Onnu"	Ilayaraja	S. Ramesan Nair	Naveen
Dr. Patient	53	"Earan Nilave"	Bennet-Veetraag	Joffy Tharakan	Veetraag
Garjanam	54	"Chenthamara Poove"	Mani Sharma	Siju Thuravoor	Vidhu Prathap
Daivathinte Kaiyoppu	55	"Priyathame"	Vijay Krishna	K. S. Harisankar	G Venugopal
Daivathinte Kaiyoppu	56	"SnehaNaadha"	Vijay Krishna	Aparna Karimpil	

=== 2010 ===
Film	No	Song	Composer(s)	Lyricist(s)	Co-artist(s)
Aagathan	57	"Oro Kanavum"	Ouseppachan	Kaithapram Damodaran Namboothiri	Vijay Yesudas
Aagathan	58	"Njan Kanavil"(Duet Version)	Ouseppachan	Kaithapram Damodaran Namboothiri	Ranjith
Aagathan	59	"Njan Kanavil"(Female Version)	Ouseppachan	Kaithapram Damodaran Namboothiri	
Four Friends	60	"Oru Naal"	M Jayachandran	Kaithapram Damodaran Namboothiri	Vijay Yesudas, Karthik
College Days	61	"Vennilavin"(Female Version)	Ronnie Raphael	Kaithapram Damodaran Namboothiri	
Penpattanam	62	"Nee Entethalle"	M G Sreekumar	Kaithapram Damodaran Namboothiri	Madhu Balakrishnan
Oru Naal Varum	63	"Maavin Chottile"	M G Sreekumar	Murukan Kattakada	
Sakudumbam Shyamala	64	"Palazhi Theerathe"	M G Sreekumar	Vayalar Sarathchandra Varma	
Kadha Thudarunnu	65	"Mazhamegha Chelin"	Ilayaraja	Vayalar Sarathchandra Varma	Vijay Yesudas
Ringtone	66	"NeelaPonmaane"	Ishaan Dev	Joffy Tharakan	Vineeth Sreenivasan
Pattinte Palazhi	67	"Malar Manjalumaayi"	Dr. Suresh Manimala	O N V Kurupu	Vijay Yesudas
Plus 2	68	"Kannolam"(Version l)	Manu Ramesan	S. Ramesan Nair	Karthik
Plus 2	69	"Kannolam"(Version ll)	Manu Ramesan	S. Ramesan Nair	Karthik
Avan	70	"Vazhiyorathenno"	Anil Gopalan	O S Unnikrishnan	Vivekanandan
Elsamma Enna Aankutty	71	"Ithile Thozhi"	Rajamani	Rafeeq Ahammed	Vijay Yesudas
Thriller	72	"Orma Than Nilave"	Dharan	B K Harinarayanan	Alphons Joseph
Nanthuni	73	"Nin Mozhiyil"	P V Navadhan	Sudhamsu	Vidhu Prathap
Brahmasthram	74	"Sandyayude"	Vijay Krishna	Vayalar Sarathchandra Varma	

=== 2011 ===
Film	No	Song	Composer(s)	Lyricist(s)	Co-artist(s)
Christian Brothers	75	"Sayyave Sayyave"	Deepak Dev	Kaithapram Damodaran Namboothiri	Shankar Mahadevan
Christian Brothers	76	"Kannum Kannum"	Deepak Dev	Kaithapram Damodaran Namboothiri	Shankar Mahadevan
Urumi	77	"Aaro Nee Aaro"	Deepak Dev	Kaithapram Damodaran Namboothiri	K J Yesudas
Living Together	78	"Raagachandran"	M Jayachandran	Kaithapram Damodaran Namboothiri	Karthik
Three Kings	79	"Chakkaramaavin"	Ouseppachan	Shibu Chakravarthy	Anoop Sankar
Bangkok Summer	80	"Oru Kaaryam"	Ouseppachan	Shibu Chakravarthy	Renjith Govind
Ninnishtam Ennishtam 2	81	"Ilam Manjin"	Kannur Rajan Recreated by Dr.C.V.Renjith	Mankombu Gopalakrishnan	Vijay Yesudas
Ithu Nammude Katha	82	"Olakkili Kuzhaloothi"	Mohan Sithara	Santhosh Varma	Madhu Balakrishnan
Oru Marubhoomikkadha	83	"Chembaka Vallikali"	M G Sreekumar	Rajeev Alungal	M G Sreekumar
Innanu Aa Kalyanam	84	"Madhuramee" (Daffumuttum)	Bijibal	Vayalar Sarathchandra Varma	RaviSankar
Snehaveedu	85	"Chandrabimbathin"	Ilayaraja	Rafeeq Ahammed	
Sivapuram	86	"Mindathe Mindunnu"	Ishaan Dev	Anil Panachooran	Sreekumar Vakkayil

=== 2012 ===
Film	No	Song	Composer(s)	Lyricist(s)	Co-artist(s)
Arike	87	"Shyama Hare"	Ouseppachan	Shibu Chakravarthy	
Thiruvambadi Thamban	88	"Aaranu Nee[D]"	Ouseppachan	Dr.Madhu Vasudev	Sudeep Kumar
Thiruvambadi Thamban	89	Aaranu Nee [F]	Ouseppachan	Dr.Madhu Vasudev	
Puthiya Theerangal	90	"Raja Gopuram"	Ilayaraja	Kaithapram Damodaran Namboothiri	Vijay Yesudas
Sriramarajyam	91	"Idhi Pattabhi"	Ilayaraja	Mankombu Gopakrishnan Nair	
Padmasree Bharat Dr. Saroj Kumar	92	"Kesu Ninte Kalla"	Deepak Dev	Anil Panachooran	Vineeth Sreenivasan
I Love Me	93	"Divaanishakal"	Deepak Dev	Rafeeq Ahammed	Karthik
Orange	94	"Neer Palunku"	Manikanth Kadri	Rafeeq Ahammed	Vineeth Sreenivasan
Theevram	95	"Ee Pakalariyathe"	Roby Abraham	Arun k Narayanan	Vineeth Sreenivasan
Casanovva	96	"Sakhiye"	Gowri Lakshmi	Gowri Lakshmi	Vijay Yesudas
Casanovva	97	"Sakhiye"[Diff]	Gowri Lakshmi	Gowri Lakshmi	Gopi Sunder
Ivan Megharoopan	98	"Nisha Surabhi"	Sharreth	ONV Kurup	
Manjadikuru	99	"Manjadi Penne"	Ramesh Narayan	Kavalam Narayana Panikkar	
Josettante Hero	100	"Ilam Nila"	Sajan K Ram	Ramesh Maniyath	Srinivas
Njanum Ente Familiyum	101	"Akkam Pakkam"	MG Sreekumar	Rajeev Alungal	MG Sreekumar, Aparna Menon
Neeranjanam	102	"Nadam Sunadam"	Kuzhalmandam Ramakrishnan	Kuzhalmandam Ramakrishnan	
Song Of Solomon	103	"En Priyane"	Joji Thomas	Joji Thomas	

=== 2013 ===
Film	No	Song	Composer(s)	Lyricist(s)	Co-artist(s)
Teens	104	"Ea Mazhayithalil"	Viswajith	Sohan Lal	
Teens	105	"Swaram Swaram"	Viswajith	Sohan Lal	Anand, Shaani
Kadhaveedu	106	"Kattile Poomanam"	M Jayachandran	Sohan Lal	
72 Model	107	"Kuyilinte Pattu Ketto"	M Jayachandran	Santhosh Varma	Rajesh Krishnan
Oru Indian Pranayakatha	108	"Saajan Aavodi"	Vidyasagar	Rafeeq Ahammed	Manasi
Geethanjali	109	"Koodilla Kuyilamme"	Vidyasagar	ONV Kurupu	M G Sreekumar
Nadan	110	"Eathu Sundara[F]"	Ouseppachan	Prabha Varma	
Musafir	111	"Ekayai"	Ouseppachan	Capt Suneer Hamza	
Maad Dad	112	"Amma Thinkal"	Alex Paul	Santhosh Varma	
White Paper	113	"Onnu Minduvan"	M G Sreekumar	Murukan Kattakada	
Kadal Kadannu Oru Maathukutty	114	"Rakshaka"	Shahabaz Aman	Anu Elizabath Jose	
Kutteem Kolum	115	"Karalilozhukum"	Shaan Rahman	Vinayak Sasikumar	Shaan Rahman
Amen	116	"Athmaavil"	Prashant Pillai	Kavalam Narayana Panikkar	Preethi Pillai, Shankar Sharma, Karita Mohan
Mr Bean - The Laugh Riot	117	"Vannathi Kiliye"	MR Rajakrishnan	Padmaja Radhakrishnan	Ravisankar
Mr Bean - The Laugh Riot	118	"Neeyoru Vasanthamai"	MR Rajakrishnan	Padmaja Radhakrishnan	Vineeth Sreenivasan
Crocodile Love Story	119	"Aaro Aaro"	Arun Siddharth	C Sreeparasad	Sreejith Pillai
Ayaal	120	"Kannanthali Muttathoru"	MG Anil	M T Pradeep Kumar	
Ayaal	121	"Manassil Oru"[F]	R Somashekharan	M T Pradeep Kumar	
Pakaram	122	"Neela Megham"	MG Radhakrishnan	Bichu Thirumala	Vijay Yesudas
Thekku Thekkoru Desathu	123	"Ambala Muttathe"	Arun Raj	Aji Puthoor	
Chewing Gum	124	"En Jeevane"	Jonathan Bruce	Praveen M Sukumaran	Naresh Iyer
Annayum Rasoolum	125	"Vazhivakkil"	K	Anwar Ali	Anand Aravindhakshan
Silayugathile Achan	125	"Chakkaramavin"	Rajamani	Saheendran Keezhoor	
Ennennum Ormakkai	126	"Azhake Manjumani"	Saiju Renju	Vayalar Sarathchandra Varma	Vijay Yesudas

=== 2014 ===
Film	No	Song	Composer(s)	Lyricist(s)	Co-artist(s)
Pianist	127	"Ini Padoo"	Riyaz Shah	Rafeeq Ahammed	Solo
Pianist	128	"Ini Padoo"[Extend Version]	Riyaz Shah	Rafeeq Ahammed	Solo
Pianist	129	"Ee Kankonile"[D]	Riyaz Shah	Rafeeq Ahammed	Haricharan
Pianist	130	"Ee Kankonile"[F]	Riyaz Shah	Rafeeq Ahammed	
Salaam Kashmir	131	"Kannadi Puzhayile"	M Jayachandran	Rafeeq Ahammed	Jayaram
Praise The Lord	132	"Innaleyolam"	Shaan Rahman	Rafeeq Ahammed	
Villali Veeran	133	"Ente Manassin" [Mandharame]	S A Rajkumar	Unknown	Vijay Yesudas
Ottamandaram	134	"Onnanam Kombathe"	Ramesh Narayan	Vinod Mankara	
2nd Innings	135	"Oru Vakkil"	Aby Tom Cyriac	Santhosh Varma	
Oru Korean Padam	136	"Pournami Penninannu"	Vasudev Shanmukharaj	Kaithapram Damodaran Namboothiri	K. J. Yesudas

=== 2015 ===
Film	No	Song	Composer(s)	Lyricist(s)	Co-artist(s)
Baahubali: The Beginning (D)	137	"Pacha Theeyanu Nee"	M M Keeravani	Mankombu Gopalakrishnan	Vijay Yesudas
Baahubali: The Beginning (D)	138	"Njaan Chendena"	M M Keeravani	Mankombu Gopalakrishnan	Vijay Yesudas
Nirnayakam	139	"Ven Pakal Kili"	M Jayachandran	Santhosh Varma	Sachin Warrier
Su Su Sudhi Valmeekam	140	"Kayamboo Niramayi"	Bijibal	Santhosh Varma	Girija Varma
Rani Padmini	141	"Varoo Pokam"	Bijibal	Rafeeq Ahammed	Devadutt, Lola
Bhaskar The Rascal	142	"I Love You Mummy"	Deepak Dev	Rafeeq Ahammed	Devika Deepak Dev
Urumbukal Urangarilla	143	"Muthe Muthe"	Gopi Sunder	B K Harinarayanan	P Jayachandran
Madhura Naranga	144	"Kankankalil"	Sreejith-Saachin(Yuvvh)	Rajeev Nair	Vijesh Gopal
Anarkali	145	"Ee Thanutha"	Vidyasagar	Rajeev Nair	Karthik
ATM	146	" Nilave"	Antony John	Joby Kavalam	Antony John
Utharachemeen	147	"Kanakambarathile"(Duet Version)	K S Binu Anand	K S Hariharan	K J Yesudas, Sunil Pallipuram
Utharachemeen	148	"Kanakambarathile"(Female Version)	K S Binu Anand	K S Hariharan	Solo

=== 2016 ===
Film	No	Song	Composer(s)	Lyricist(s)	Co-artist(s)
White	149	"Oru Vela Veendumee"	Rahul Raj	Rafeeq Ahammed	
White	150	"Premardamavunne Lokam"	Rahul Raj	Rafeeq Ahammed	Vijay Yesudas
Campus Diary	151	"Kathil Chiriyode"	Bijibal	Rafeeq Ahammed	Vijay Yesudas
Marupadi	152	"Ponnilanji"	M Jayachandran	Rafeeq Ahammed	
Thoppil Joppan	153	"Chil Chinchilamay"	Vidyasagar	Vayalar Sarathchandra Varma	Madhu Balakrishnan
Kochavva Paulo Ayyappa Coelho	154	"Neela Kannulla"	Shaan Rahman	Vayalar Sarathchandra Varma	Vijay Yesudas
Style	155	"Kankalilayiram Kanavukal" (Chenthamara Chundil)	Jassie Gift	Manu Manjith	Haricharan
Action Hero Biju	156	"Vande Mataram"	Jerry Amaldev	Bankim Chandra Chatterji	
Mazhaneerthullikal	157	"Neeyariyathe"	Ouseppachan	K V Mohankumar	Vijay Yesudas, Binni Krishnakumar
Shikhamani	158	"Nila Vaanile"	Sudheep Palanad	Shibu Chakravarthy	Vijay Yesudas
Shikhamani	159	"Nila Vaanile" (Remix)	Sudheep Palanad	Shibu Chakravarthy	
Kattumakkan	160	"Manassinullil Azhakerum"	Murali Guruvayoor	Rajeev	Najim Arshad
Janatha Garage (D)	161	"Nee Himakanamay"	Devisri Prasad	N/A	
Maattam	161	"Nool Thumbile"	Sajeev Mangalath	Sreenadh Anchal	

=== 2017 ===
Film	No	Song	Composer(s)	Lyricist(s)	Co-artist(s)
Baahubali 2: The Conclusion (D)	162	"Kanna Nee Urangeda"	M M Keeravani	Mankombu Gopalakrishnan	
Baahubali 2: The Conclusion (D)	163	"Ore Oru Raja"	M M Keeravani	Mankombu Gopalakrishnan	Vijay Yesudas
Baahubali 2: The Conclusion (D)	164	"Bali Bali Bali BaahuBali"	M M Keeravani	Mankombu Gopalakrishnan	Vijay Yesudas, Yazin Nizar
Munthirivallikal Thalirkkumbol	165	"Oru Puzhayarikil"	Bijibal	Rafeeq Ahammed	
Oru Cinemakkaran	166	"Ozhuki Ozhuki"	Bijibal	Rafeeq Ahammed	Vineeth Sreenivasan
Mom (D)	167	"Earan Megham"	A R Rahman	Rafeeq Ahammed	
Cross Road	168	"Melakey ponnal Ninne"	Anitha Shaiq	Rafeeq Ahammed	Anitha Shaiq, Chorus
1971: Beyond Borders	169	"Oru Vakkinal"(Duet Version)	Rahul Subrahmanian	Nikhil.S.Mattathil	M. G. Sreekumar
1971: Beyond Borders	170	"Oru Vakkinal"(Female Version)	Rahul Subrahmanian	Nikhil.S.Mattathil	
Melle	171	"Melle Manassinullil"	Dr. Donald Mathew	Rajeev Alunkal	Dr. Donald Mathew
Melle	172	"Konchi Konchi Pookkum"	Dr. Donald Mathew	Rajeev Alunkal	
Bobby	173	"Pathiye Pathiye Mazhavil"	Ronnie Raphael	B K Hariharanarayanan	K. S. Harisankar
Raja Kireedam (D)	174	"Sukhibhava Sukhibhava"	Anoop Rubens	unknown	Jithin Raj
Nilavariyathe	175	"Paalazhi"	Kanhangad Ramachandran	Kaithapram Damodaran Namboothiri	Vijay Yesudas
Chicken Kokkachi	176	"Thumpikal Thalam Thullum"	Jassie Gift	B K Hariharayanan, Manu Manjith	Hesham Abdul Wahab
Second Rain	177	"Peyyum Mazhaye"	Varun Unni	R. Venu Gopal	Ranjith

=== 2018 ===
Film	No	Song	Composer(s)	Lyricist(s)	Co-artist(s)
Abhiyude Kadha Anuvinteyum (D)	178	"Enthino Kanne"(Female Version)	Dharan Kumar	B K Karinarayanan	
Abhiyude Kadha Anuvinteyum (D)	179	"Enthino Kanne"(Duet Version)	Dharan Kumar	B K Karinarayanan	Haricharan
Ennaalum Sarath..?	180	"Thulli Mazha Vellam"	Ouseppachan	Rafeeq Ahammed	Chorus
Kala Viplavam Pranayam	181	"Medakattu Veesi"	Athul Anand	Sreejith Achuthan Nair	Vijay Yesudas
Cuban Colony	182	"Neela Raave"	Aloshya Petre	Manoj Varghese Palekkattil	Yazin Nizar
Shirk	183	"Kannuneer Mazha"	Sajeev Mangalath	Manu Krishna	
Jeevitham Oru Mukham Moodi	184	"Etho Mounam"	Nahoom Abraham	Nahoom Abraham, VS Abhilash	Haricharan

=== 2019 ===
Film	No	Song	Composer(s)	Lyricist(s)	Co-artist(s)
Vijay Superum Pournamiyum	185	"Eatho Mazhayil"	Prince George	JisJoy	Vijay Yesudas
Oru Caribbean Udayippu	186	"Varmathiye"	Charu Hariharan	B K Harinarayanan	Solo
Sakalakalashala	187	"Mandharapoovum"(Duet Version)	Aby Tom Cyriac	B K Harinarayanan	Karthik
Kalikoottukar	188	"Neeyoral Mathramen"	Vinu Thomas	B K Harinarayanan	Najim Arshad
An International Local Story	189	"Athmaavil Peyyum"	Gopi Sunder	B K Harinarayanan	K. S. Harisankar
Thenkasi Kattu	190	"Thenikkatte "	Rwithik S Chand	Santhosh Varma	Rwithik S Chand
Old Is Gold	191	"Oru Mazhayil"	Jubair Muhammed	B.K. Harinarayanan	Jubair Muhammed
Prakashante Metro	192	"Mazha Mukietho"	Rahul Subrahmanian	Shyam Nettayikkodu	Najim Arshad
Saaho (D)	193	"Baby Won't You Tell Me"	Shankar–Ehsaan–Loy	Vinayak Sasikumar	Shankar Mahadevan
Pranaya Meenukalude Kadal	194	"Neelime"	Shaan Rahman	Rafeeq Ahamed	Najim Arshad
Manoharam	195	"Kinavo"	Sanjeev T	Joe Paul	Sanjeev T
Thakkol	196	"Aakasathin Vellivelicham"	M. Jayachandran	Prabha Varma	Yazin Nizar
Brother's Day	197	"Oamale Ninte"	4 Musics		

=== 2020 ===
Film	No	Song	Composer(s)	Lyricist(s)	Co-artist(s)
Al Mallu	198	"Medamaasa"	Ranjin Raj	B.K. Harinarayanan	K. S. Harisankar
Varane Avashyamund	199	"Muthunne Kannukalil"(Duet)	Alphons Joseph	Santhosh Varma	Shweta Somasundaram
Varane Avashyamund	200	"Muthunne Kannukalil"(Female)	Alphons Joseph	Santhosh Varma	
Kappela	201	"Kannil"	Sushin Shyam	Vishnu Shobhana	Sooraj Santhosh
LoveFm	202	"Neeyen Nenjil"	Kaithapram Damodaran Namboothiri	Kaithapram	Vijay Yesudas
Velikku Veluppankalam	203	"Yaathrayil thaaneyaay" (Female)	Balabhaskar (re worked by Bijibal)	Joy S Thamalam	

=== 2021 ===
Film	No	Song	Composer(s)	Lyricist(s)	Co-artist(s)
Chathur Mukham	204	"Maaya Kondu"	Dawn Vincent	Manu Manjith	
Mohan Kumar Fans	205	"Neelamizhi"	Prince George	Jis Joy	Vijay Yesudas
Marakkar - Arabikadalinte Simham	206	"Kannil Ente"	Ronnie Raphael	B.K.Harinarayanan	Vineeth Sreenivasan

=== 2022 ===
Film	No	Song	Composer(s)	Lyricist(s)	Co-artist(s)
Aha Sundara	207	"Tandanananda"	Vivek Sagar	Lakshmi Ennapaadam	Yazin Nizar
Malayankunju	208	"Mannum Niranje"	A. R. Rahman	Vinayak Sasikumar	
Ottu	209	"Orey Nokkil"	A. H. Kaasif	Vinayak Sasikumar	
Ponniyin Selvan: I (D)	210	"Alakadal"	A. R. Rahman	Rafeeq Ahamed	

=== 2023 ===
Film	No	Song	Composer(s)	Lyricist(s)	Co-artist(s)
Lovefully Yours Veda	211	"Aakasha Palazhyil"	Rahul Raj	Rethi Sivaraman	
Shaakuntalam (D)	212	"Madhura Gathama"	Mani Sharma	Kailas Rishi	Najim Arshad
Ponniyin Selvan: II (D)	213	"Veera Raja Veera"	A. R. Rahman	Rafeeq Ahamed	Srinivas
Ponniyin Selvan: II (D)	214	"Thazhe Mazha Deva"	A. R. Rahman	Rafeeq Ahamed	
Adipurush (D)	215	"Pranaya Dhara"	Ajay-Atul	Mankombu Gopalakrishnan	Karthik
Valatty Tale of Tails	216	"Arike Koottay"	Varun Sunil	B K Harinarayanan	Ayraan
Kushi (D)	217	"Aradhya"	Hesham Abdul Wahab	Arun Alat	KS Harisankar
RDX: Robert Dony Xavier	218	"Neela Nilave"(Female)	Sam C. S.	Manu Manjith	
Bandra	219	"Vaarmeghame"	Sam C. S.	Santhosh Varma	Kapil Kapilan
Thaal	220	"Pulariyil Ilaveyil"	Bijibal	B K Harinarayan	K. S. Harisankar
Marivillin Gopurangal	221	"Pokathe"	Vidyasagar	Vinayak Sasikumar	K. S. Harisankar
Class By A Soldier	222	"Aaro Melle"	S R Suraj	Shyam Enaath	Vijay Yesudas
Adiyantharavasthakalathe Anuragam	223	"Pranayathin"(Duet)	T S Jairaj	Titus Attingal	Najim Arshad
Adiyantharavasthakalathe Anuragam	224	"Pranayathin"(Female)	T S Jairaj	Titus Attingal	

=== 2024 ===
Film	No	Song	Composer(s)	Lyricist(s)	Co-artist(s)
Gu	225	"Kanna En Kanave"	Jonathan Bruce	Binoy Krishnan	
Kabeerinte Divasangal	226	"Kanum Neram"	Aruldev	P.T. Binu	Bipin
Lucky Baskhar (D)	227	"Mindathe"	G.V. Prakash Kumar	Vaisakh Sugunan	Yazin Nizar
Rifle Club	228	"Gandharva Ganam"	Rex Vijayan	Vinayak Sasikumar	Sooraj Santhosh

=== 2025 ===
Film	No	Song	Composer(s)	Lyricist(s)	Co-artist(s)
Get-Set Baby	229	"Manam Peyyum"	Sam C. S.	Vinayak Sasikumar	Karthik
Dexter (D)	230	"Etho Ramazhayo"	Srinath Vijay	Joe Paul	
Padakkalam	231	"Kalamithu Padakkalam"	Rajesh Murugesan	Vinayak Sasikumar	Gayatri Rajiv

=== 2026 ===
Film	No	Song	Composer(s)	Lyricist(s)	Co-artist(s)
Ranabaali (D)	232	"Enthe Kannaala"	Ajay–Atul	Siju Thuravoor	Karthik

== Unreleased Film songs ==
Film	No	Song	Composer(s)	Lyricist(s)	Co-artist(s)
Balram Vs Tharadas	1	"Neelathadakangalo"	Jassie Gift	Kaithapram Damodaran Namboothiri	

== Non-film songs ==
=== 1998 ===
Album	Song	Composer(s)	Lyricist(s)	Co-artist(s)
Amma Mookambika	"Panachikkattu Bhajichu"	M. K. Arjunan	R. K. Damodaran, Mullanezhi	Solo

=== 2004 ===
Album	Song	Composer(s)	Lyricist(s)	Co-artist(s)
Atma	"Mounam Melle"	Robert Keettikkal	Joffy Tharakan	Solo
Atma	"Ethetho Janmathil"	Robert Keettikkal	N/A	Vijay Yesudas

=== 2006 ===
Album	Song	Composer(s)	Lyricist(s)	Co-artist(s)
Meera Prabhu	"Radhayude"	Premkumar Mumbai	Gireesh Puthanchery	Solo
Meera Prabhu	"Meera Prabhuve"	Premkumar Mumbai	Gireesh Puthanchery	Solo
Meera Prabhu	"Vrindavana Krishna"	Premkumar Mumbai	Gireesh Puthanchery	Solo
Punyavarshini	"Manasa Devi"	K. M. Udayan	Hari Ettumanoor	Solo
Punyavarshini	"Mangathe Maayathe"	K. M. Udayan	Hari Ettumanoor	Solo
Punyavarshini	"Pacha Praanangal"	K. M. Udayan	Hari Ettumanoor	Solo
Nandalala	"Nandalala Gopakumara"	K. G. Jayan	S. Ramesan Nair	Solo

=== 2007 ===
Album	Song	Composer(s)	Lyricist(s)	Co-artist(s)
Neelambari	"Hridaya Vaniyil"	Chullimannoor Shajahan	Thomas Isaac	K. J. Yesudas
Manivarnan	"Odi Vaa Chanchadi Vaa"	M. G. Anil	Pallippuram Mohanachandran	Sujatha Mohan
Pallatham Kulangare Devi	"Manassam Theerthathil"	S. Jayakumar	Vijay Narayambalam	Solo
Nilavelicham	"Koyimutta"	Aziz Bava	Khader Pettepadam	Biju Narayanan
Nilavelicham	"Snehathin"	Aziz Bava	Khader Pettepadam	Biju Narayanan

=== 2008 ===
Album	Song	Composer(s)	Lyricist(s)	Co-artist(s)
Malabarin Muthe	"Ponnani Puzha"	K. A. Latheef	Latheef Mullassery	Solo
Varumo Vasantham	"Nila Chandanam"	Raghukumar	Rajiv. G. Nair	Vineeth Sreenivasan
Sreeprasadam	"Varamaruloo Devi"	Kavalam Sreekumar	T. Parvathy	Solo
Thalolam	"Kandittum"	Viswajith	Sohan Lal	Solo
Violet	"Kanne Kanne"	Midhun	Sreekanth J Vazhapally	Vidhu Prathap
Kandu Njan Kannane	"Aaromal Kannane"	M. G. Sreekumar	S. Ramesan Nair	Solo
Kandu Njan Kannane	"Guruvayoorappane"	M. G. Sreekumar	S. Ramesan Nair	Solo
Kandu Njan Kannane	"Kanna Ninne Thedi"	M. G. Sreekumar	S. Ramesan Nair	K. S. Chithra, M. G. Sreekumar

=== 2009 ===
Album	Song	Composer(s)	Lyricist(s)	Co-artist(s)
Rithu Bhangi	"Pranaya Mazhayil"	Kallara Gopan	Sreeja Balaraj	Solo
Mounam Pranayam	"Mazha Pole"	Sajan Mediamax	Shyni Jokos	Solo
Thinkalazhcha	"Chella Mizhi"	Aneesh Alungal	Unknown	Franco
Sree Nandanam	"Ambadi Kanna"	Jayanandan Cherthala	Arshad. K. Rahim	Solo
Sree Nandanam	"Kanna Karmukil(F)"	Jayanandan Cherthala	Arshad. K. Rahim	Solo
Sree Nandanam	"Ananda Roopanalle(F)"	Jayanandan Cherthala	Arshad. K. Rahim	Solo
Muth	"Ravil Parannu Varoo"	V. R. Jayaprakash	Jose Manikkala	Nixon
Muth	"Chiriyil Nin"	V. R. Jayaprakash	Pappanamkodu Shivakumar	Solo

=== 2010 ===
Album	Song	Composer(s)	Lyricist(s)	Co-artist(s)
Ennennum	"Punya Dinamalle"	Vijay Karun	East Coast Vijayan	Solo
Nithya Sneham	"Irulezhunee Vazhiyil"	Babu Kodamvelil		Solo
Oru Swapna Mandaram	"Kumkumam Charthi"	Chullimannoor Shajahan	Samuel Mavelikkara	Solo
Ananda Kannan	"Neelakadambe"	Jayanandan Cherthala	Siju Thuravoor	Solo
Ananda Kannan	"Radha Parayunnu"	Jayanandan Cherthala	Chowalloor Krishnankutty	Solo
Pattukalude Pattu	"Poothinkal Poopalika"	Sreekumaran Thampy		Vidhu Prathap

=== 2011 ===
Album	Song	Composer(s)	Lyricist(s)	Co-artist(s)
Vishupakshi Paadunnu	"Poovukal Poovukal"	M. K. Arjunan	O. N. V. Kurup	Kallara Gopan
Moonnam Marian Carmel	"Amme Ashcharyame"	Fr.Shaji Thumpacheriyil		Solo
Idaya Mazha	"Yahe Nin"	Jonathan Bruce	Jolly Sam, Krishnakumar	Solo
Flowers	"Arikil Nee"	Stinish Ignow	Sreemangalam Sreekumar	Solo
Meghamalhar	"Ananda Mazhayil(F)"	Damodar Narayanan	Poovachal Khader	Solo
Meghamalhar	"Ananda Mazhayil(D)"	Damodar Narayanan	Poovachal Khader	Srinivas
Mizhiyil	"Mazhavil Poo(D)"	Jayanandan Cherthala	Subhash Panicker	Subhash Panicker
Mizhiyil	"Mazhavil Poo(F)"	Jayanandan Cherthala	Subhash Panicker	Solo
Divyam	"Mazhavil Poo(D)"	Murali Ramanathan	Meena Menon	Solo
Divyam	"Sandhya Neram"	Murali Ramanathan	Rahul Soman	Solo
Divyam	"Kayampoo Varnan"	Murali Ramanathan	Leela Narayana Swamy	Solo

=== 2012 ===
Album	Song	Composer(s)	Lyricist(s)	Co-artist(s)
Thanneerkkoda	"Kunkuma Sandhyakal"	Anil Balakrishnan	A. G. Lakshmy, S.B. Ashokan	Solo
Thanneerkkoda	"Ammaikkai Nalkeedam"	Anil Balakrishnan	A. G. Lakshmy, S.B. Ashokan	Solo
Thanneerkkoda	"Karikkakam Vaazhum"	Anil Balakrishnan	A. G. Lakshmy, S.B. Ashokan	Solo
Seven AM	"Akalum"	Aswin Renju	Vinu Krishnan	Solo
Niravu	"Maychalum Maayatha"	Jojo Kongamala	Fr.Shinto Edassery	Solo
Kavyadalangal	"Melle Melle"	Kavya Madhavan		Solo
Oru Naal	"Oru Naal(F)"	K. M. Afsal	Rafeeq Ahammed	Solo
Oru Naal	"Oru Naal (D)"	K. M. Afsal	Rafeeq Ahammed	Sreenivas

=== 2013 ===
Album	Song	Composer(s)	Lyricist(s)	Co-artist(s)
Nandagopalam	"Poovali Pasuve"	Ramesh Narayan	Vayalar Madhavankutty	Solo
Vilichu Vilikettu	"Ennolam Ninroopam"	Jerson Antony	Jessy Joseph	Solo

=== 2014 ===
Album	Song	Composer(s)	Lyricist(s)	Co-artist(s)
Madhuram	"Madhuramee"	Damodar Narayanan	Damodar Narayanan	Solo
Madhuram	"Madhuramee(D)"	Damodar Narayanan	Damodar Narayanan	Sreenivas
Madhuram	"Minnum"	Damodar Narayanan	K. C. Geetha	Sreenivas
God	"Sankeerthanangal"	M. Jayachandran		Solo
Penne	"Penney"	Jomy George	Chittoor Gopi	Jomy George

=== 2015 ===
Album	Song	Composer(s)	Lyricist(s)	Co-artist(s)
Snehanjali	"Anudinam Aarbhada"	Steve Mathen	Fr. John Pichapally	Solo

=== 2016 ===
Album	Song	Composer(s)	Lyricist(s)	Co-artist(s)
Pranaya Nilavu	"Hridayathil Kaicherthu"	Rajamani, Achu Rajamani	Sasikala Menon	Solo

=== 2019 ===
Album	Song	Composer(s)	Lyricist(s)	Co-artist(s)
	"Pular Veyil"	Jithesh Narayanan	B.K. Harinaraynan	Jithesh Narayanan

=== 2024 ===
Album	Song	Composer(s)	Lyricist(s)	Co-artist(s)
New Krishna Devotional Music	"Kanna Nee Vaayo"	Josy Alappuzha	Jaseena Rahim	Solo
Sthree- The Anthem	"Penney Penney"	Shweta Mohan	Anu Elizabeth	Solo
Kinapanthal (Album Song)	"Kinapanthal"	Yousuf Karakkad	Rafeeq Ahamed	Yousuf Karakkad

=== 2025 ===
Album	Song	Composer(s)	Lyricist(s)	Co-artist(s)
50 Years of Sujatha Mohan Special Indie Music	"Maathey"	Vidyasagar	S Ramesan Nair	Sujatha Mohan

=== Non-categorized ===
Album	Song	Composer(s)	Lyricist(s)	Co-artist(s)
Pranaya Nilavu	"Hridayathil Kaicherthu"	Rajamani, Achu Rajamani	Sasikala Menon	Solo
