= Fara Shibla =

Indian actress

- Born: Malappuram, Kerala
- Occupation: Actress
- Years active: 2019–present
- Spouse: Vijith Nair
- Children: 1

Fara Shibla is an Indian actress who works in Malayalam-language films. She gained recognition with her debut film Kakshi: Amminippilla (2019), and since then has appeared in Divorce, Kadina Kadoramee Andakadaham, Pulimada (all three 2023) and Get-Set Baby (2025).

== Career ==
Shibla made her film debut with Dinjith Ayyathan's satirical comedy Kakshi: Amminippilla (2019), playing a plump bride, Kanthi, disliked by her husband (Ahmed Sidhique). She gained 20 kg weight to play the character. Her work was praised by critics.

In Divorce (2023), she played Noorjahan, an illiterate woman seeking divorce from her husband. Also in 2023, she played Basil Joseph's sister in Kadina Kadoramee Andakadaham and Joju George's unfaithful fiancée in Pulimada.

In 2025, she had a supporting role in Vinay Govind's comedy drama Get-Set Baby, starring Unni Mukundan. The film received mixed reviews and fared poorly at the box office.

== Personal life ==
Shibla was born and raised in Malappuram, in a conservative Muslim family. She identifies as a non-believer. She is married to Vijith Nair, a Hindu, and they have a son, Veer Abhimanyu. Shibla often promotes body positivity through her social media.

== Filmography ==
Year	Title	Role	Notes
2019	Kakshi: Amminippilla	Kanthi Sivadasan	Credited as "Shibla"
2019	Safe	Adv. Sinimol	
2023	Divorce	Noorjahan	
2023	Kadina Kadoramee Andakadaham	Bushara	
2023	Pulimada	Jessy	
2023	Somante Krithavu	Shalini	
2025	Get-Set Baby	Aisha Rahim	
2025	Kerala Crime Files 2	Dr. Raveena	JioHotstar series
