= Bharathanatyam (film) =

2024 Indian Malayalam film

- Directed by: Krishnadas Murali
- Written by: Krishnadas Murali
- Produced by: Lini Mariam David; Anupama B. Nambiar
- Starring: Sai Kumar; Saiju Kurup; Abhiram Radhakrishnan; Kalaranjini; Sreeja Ravi
- Cinematography: Bablu Aju
- Edited by: Shafeeque V. B.
- Music by: Samuel Aby
- Production companies: Thomas Thiruvalla Films; Saiju Kurup Entertainments
- Release date: 30 August 2024
- Running time: 121 minutes
- Country: India
- Language: Malayalam

Bharathanatyam is a 2024 Indian Malayalam-language comedy drama film written and directed by Krishnadas Murali (in his directorial debut). The film stars Saikumar, Saiju Kurup, Abhiram Radhakrishnan, Kalaranjini, and Sreeja Ravi. The film depicts a young man's struggle to protect a family secret from their nosy neighbours and villagers.

Principal photography began in March 2024 in Thrissur and was wrapped up in April 2024. Samuel Aby composed the music and background score. Bharathanatyam was released in theatre's on 30 August 2024. A sequel named Bharathanatyam 2 Mohiniyattam was released in April 2026. Another sequel titled Bharathanatyam 3 Rasaleela was announced in June 2026.

== Plot ==
Sasi comes from a traditional family and lives with his parents - Bharatan Nair and Saraswati - as well as his elder sister Shanthi, her husband Ashokan, their kids, as well as a younger brother, Arun Ghosh. His younger sister Sreelatha and her husband Gopan live nearby. He has an active social life and works at the local temple committee. The temple committee is planning to conduct a new pooja called Griha Pooja (Blessing the house), to bless everyone's houses as well as bring revenue to the temple, on Sasi's idea. The committee members agree that the pooja will happen first at their own homes so that the local people can be persuaded to do the pooja.

One day, Bharathan Nair suffers a stroke, and doctors inform Sasi that his father's days are numbered. Since Sasi's father is in the hospital, they agree to conduct the pooja in his home later on, to the chagrin of his rival in the temple committee, Subash. Sreelatha and Gopan also come to stay with them due to Bharatan Nair's condition, although they also want Rs. 25 lakhs help from Sasi in securing a job for Gopan. Bharatan Nair, convinced he will die soon, reveals a shocking secret to Sasi - he has another wife, Rukmini, and a son, Ajay Ghosh, in Sreekandapuram, whom he wishes to see one last time. He also asks Sasi to inform this news at their home. Everyone at home are shocked, but eventually agree to respect Bharatan Nair's wishes and Sasi goes to bring them. To everyone's surprise, Arun Ghosh and Ajay Ghosh look very similar to each other.

To Bharatan Nair's shock, the doctors inform him that he is progressing really well and they soon discharge him. Rukmini and Ajay decide to stay with them to look after Bharatan Nair. At first, Sasi and his family do not like the idea, but go along with it for the sake of their father. Saraswati and Shanthi are wary of Rukmini, though she tries to be friendly with everyone. They make Rukmini and Ajay stay in one of the rooms and do not allow them to go out of the house, nor allow anyone else to come into the house, for fear that the secret of Bharatan Nair's second wife may get out.

Ashokan and Gopan convince Sasi that Rukmini and Ajay may have an eye on the inheritance of Bharatan Nair and may ask for their share. To prove that Saraswati is his first wife and that the marriage with Rukmini is illegal, they search the house for their marriage certificate, but Bharatan Nair informs them that he hasn't registered their marriage. To their shock, he has registered his marriage with Rukmini, making her his legal wife. This leads to a lot of comedic moments in the story. However, Arun and Ajay soon bond due to their look-alike-ness and Sreelatha also bonds with Rukmini. The family slowly starts to get used to them.

Meanwhile, the temple committee starts pressurising Sasi to conduct the pooja at his home saying that everyone in the temple committee have finished it, and Subash also starts suspecting that something is going on at Sasi's home, after seeing that Sasi does not allow anyone inside his house. Finally the temple committee forces their way inside and does the Pooja and Sasi, fearful of the neighbours watching, goes along with it. The Velichappadu is confused after seeing both Arun and Ajay, and Subash confirms that something is going on.

However, at this same time, Bharatan Nair dies after being hit on the head with a coconut. During the last rituals, Saraswati herself asks Sasi to bring Rukmini and Ajay for the rituals and Sasi brings them, finally revealing to the local people that his father had a second wife and son. After the rituals, Rukmini and Ajay decide to leave and say that they have no wish for their share in the property, but Saraswati and the rest of the family, having accepted them, ask them to stay. The film ends on a happy note, with the whole family united.

== Cast ==
- Saikumar as Kodiyath Bharathan Nair
- Saiju Kurup as Sasidharan "Sasi" Nair
- Abhiram Radhakrishnan as Subash
- Kalaranjini as Saraswathi, Bharathan's first wife
- Sreeja Ravi as Rukmini, Bharathan's second wife
- Divya M. Nair as Shanthi
- Sruthy Suresh as Sreelatha
- Nandu Pothuval as Ashokan
- Swathi Das Prabhu as Gopan
- Jinil Rex as Arun Ghosh Bharathan
- Jivin Rex as Ajay Ghosh Bharathan
- Sohan Seenulal as Madhu
- Manikandan Pattambi as Velichappadu Sudheer
- Salim Hassan as Advocate Henry Samuel
- Pooja Mahesh as Doctor
- Krishnadas Murali as Prasad

== Soundtrack ==
Samuel Aby composed the film's music and background score, with lyrics written by Manu Manjith.

Track Listing
| No. | Title | Singer(s) | Length |
|---|---|---|---|
| 1. | "Vambanmaray" | Vaikom Vijayalakshmi |
| 2. | "Tharavadi Atrocity" (Promo Song) | Aju Varghese, Shabareesh Varma |
| 3. | "Vattamittu Chuttidunna Kashtakalame" (End Credit / Trailer Bit Song) | Samuel Aby |

== Release ==
=== Theatrical ===
The film was given a U certificate by the Censor Board prior to its release.

=== Home media ===
Amazon Prime Video and ManoramaMAX acquired the digital distribution rights and began streaming on 27 September 2024. The film began streaming on YouTube from 18 February 2026. The film also started streaming on Netflix from 22 May 2026.

== Reception ==
=== Critical reception ===
Arjun Ramachandran of The South First rated the film 3/5 stars and wrote: "A feel-good entertainer with a compelling story and convincing performances". Vivek Santhosh of The New Indian Express rated the film 3/5 stars and wrote: "An entertaining and self-aware family comedy". Rohit Panikker of Times Now rated the film 3/5 stars and reviewed: "An Entertaining Film With Its Share Of Laugh Out Loud Moments".

=== Viewership ===
Even though the film underperformed in theatres, the film became huge success on OTT platforms with earning over 50 million views in 10 days and crossed 100 million in a month.

== Sequels ==
In July 2025, a sequel titled Bharathanatyam 2 Mohiniyattam was announced. The film is directed by Krishnadas Murali, who co-wrote with Vishnu R. Pradeep. The sequel continues the storyline of Bharathanatyam with a reportedly darker and more eventful narrative tone. It begins filming in November 2025. Filming of Mohiniyattam was completed in January 2026, with principal cast members including Saiju Kurup, Kalaranjini, Sreeja Ravi, Jinil Rex, and Jivin Rex returning to reprise their roles. New additions to the cast include Vinay Forrt, Jagadish, Suraj Venjaramoodu, rapper Baby Jean, Nisthar Sait, and Santhosh K. Nayar. The production wrapped up its shoot on 7 January 2026. It was released theatrically on 10 April 2026 as a Vishu release.

In June 2026, the third installment of the franchise under title Bharathanatyam 3 Rasaleela was announced with everyone reprising the role
