= Kili Poyi =

- Movie poster
- Directed by: Vinay Govind
- Screenplay by: Joseph Kurian; Vivek Ranjit; Vinay Govind
- Produced by: Siby Thottupuram; Joby Mundamattom
- Starring: Asif Ali; Aju Varghese; Sampath Raj; Raveendran; Sreejith Ravi
- Cinematography: Pradheesh M. Varma
- Edited by: Mahesh Narayan
- Music by: Rahul Raj
- Production company: SJM Entertainments
- Distributed by: SJM Entertainments
- Release date: 1 March 2013
- Running time: 90 minutes
- Country: India
- Language: Malayalam

Kili Poyi is a 2013 Indian Malayalam language film directed by Vinay Govind (in his directorial debut). a former associate of V. K. Prakash. It stars Asif Ali, Aju Varghese, Sampath Raj, Raveendran, and Sreejith Ravi in major roles. The film was produced by SJM Entertainments and written by Joseph Kurian, Vivek Ranjit, and Vinay Govind. It features music and background score composed by Rahul Raj.

== Plot ==
Chacko and Hari are young advertising professionals who are fed up with their boss (Sandra Thomas) and her tantrums. They decide to take a break and head to Goa, where Chacko ends up meeting a beautiful foreigner (Sabreen Baker). The rest of the story revolves around their return from Goa, a mysterious bag, and an extremely angry boss.

== Cast ==
- Asif Ali as Chacko
- Aju Varghese as Hari
- Sampath Raj as Rana
- Raveendran as Disco Douglas
- Sreejith Ravi as SI Alex Peter
- Joju George as Tony
- Mridul Nair as IBM
- Chemban Vinod Jose as Smuggler
- Vijay Babu as Pandey
- Sandra Thomas as Radhika
- Samata Agarwal as Jomol
- Sal Yusuf as a drug addict

== Release and reception ==
The movie was released on 1 March 2013. Paresh C. Palicha of Rediff.com gave the film a rating of 3/5, saying the film is enjoyable.

== Music ==
All music is composed, arranged, and produced by Rahul Raj. The Hindu identified "Kili Poyi" as a song that was well-liked in 2013. Raj's background score was described as having a "freshness" and "funk".

=== Track list ===
Original songs

No.	Title	Performer(s)	Length
1.	"Kili Poyi"	Rahul Raj, Vinay Govind
2.	"Kattil Payum"	Sricharan, Yazin Nizar

Original background score

No.	Title	Performer(s)	Length
1.	"Kili Poyi – Opening Theme"	Rahul Raj
2.	"Off to Goa"	Rahul Raj
3.	"Beautiful Girl"	Rahul Raj
4.	"8'inte Pani"	Rahul Raj, Joslee Lonely Doggy [Rap]
5.	"Bad Bad Feeling"	Rahul Raj, Jecin George, Aloshya Peter
6.	"Psytrance Party"	Rahul Raj, Jecin George
7.	"Disco Douglas, Alavalathi Shaji & The Kolla Sangam"	Rahul Raj
8.	"Manali Cream"	Rahul Raj, Aloshya Peter, Rex George
9.	"Imma Doped"	Rahul Raj, Aloshya Peter, Jecin George, Joslee Lonely Doggy [Rap]
10.	"The Chase"	Rahul Raj, Prashanth John, Joslee Lonely Doggy [Rap]
11.	"Don Pandey Theme"	Rahul Raj, Prashanth John
12.	"Jomol a.k.a Jo"	Rahul Raj, Rex George
13.	"Shades of Kili Poyi"	Rahul Raj
