= Divorce (2023 film) =

- Film poster
- Directed by: Mini I G
- Written by: Mini I G
- Produced by: Kerala State Film Development Corporation
- Starring: Chandhunadh; Santhosh Keezhattoor; P. Sreekumar; Fara Shibla
- Cinematography: Vinod Illampally
- Edited by: Davis Manuel
- Music by: Sachin Balu
- Production company: Chitranjali Studio
- Distributed by: Kerala State Film Development Corporation
- Release date: 24 February 2023
- Running time: 124 minutes
- Country: India
- Language: Malayalam

Divorce is a 2023 Indian Malayalam-language film written and directed by Mini IG which is about the process of divorce deconstructing dynamics of families through social, psychological and economic aspects starring Chandhunadh, Santhosh Keezhattoor, P. Sreekumar, Fara Shibla etc. It is one of the first Malayalam movie selected by Government of Kerala for funding through Kerala State Film Development Corporation for uplifting works of women directors. It is declared tax free by Govt. of Kerala. The movie got censor certificate in 2020 and was previewed in Kalabhavan theatre in 2021.

== Plot ==
The film portrays six women and their near ones from different socio- economic backgrounds undergoing the turmoil due to the disintegration in the family. When they approach the judicial system for justice, it has certain conventional measures to reach legal conclusions and their lives gets a complete overhaul.

== Cast ==
- Chandhunadh as Ram
- Santhosh Keezhattoor as Vinu
- P. Sreekumar
- Fara Shibla as Noorjahan
- Priyamvada Krishnan as Anju
- KPAC Leela
- Aswathi Kishore as Sainaba
- Amalendhu
- Suresh Kumar
- Manikuttan
- Jolly Chirayath
- Ishitha
- Arunamshu

== Reception ==
A critic from The hindu wrote that "A sensitive take on what happens when a spouse turns into a stranger"
