= Kakshi: Amminippilla =

2019 film by Dinijith Ayyathan

- Theatrical release poster
- Directed by: Dinjith Ayyathan
- Written by: Sanilesh Shivan
- Produced by: Riju Rajan
- Starring: Asif Ali; Ahmed Sidhique; Fara Shibla; Basil Joseph
- Cinematography: Bahul Ramesh
- Edited by: Sooraj E. S.
- Music by: Songs: Samuel Aby; Arun Muraleedharan; Snehachandran Ezhikkara; Background Score: Jakes Bejoy
- Production company: Zarah Films
- Distributed by: E4 Entertainment; Indywood Distribution Network; NR Films
- Release date: 28 June 2019 (India)
- Running time: 135 minutes
- Country: India
- Language: Malayalam

Kakshi: Amminippilla is a 2019 Indian Malayalam-language satirical comedy drama film directed by Dinjith Ayyathan (in his directorial debut), written by Sanilesh Shivan and produced by Riju Rajan under the banner of Zarah Films. Ahmed Sidhique and Fara Shibla play the titular characters while Asif Ali plays the role of a lawyer for the first time in his career. Ashwathy Manoharan and Basil Joseph plays other important roles. Arun Muraleedharan and debutant Samuel Aby composed the songs, while Jakes Bejoy composed the background score. Bahul Ramesh and Sooraj E. S. are the cinematographer and editor respectively. The film is distributed in India by E4 Entertainment and worldwide by Indywood Distribution Network & NR Films.

== Synopsis ==
Amminipilla is forced to marry Kanthi, who he does not find interesting. His family and extended family determine his life. The woman is a naive, fun loving person, she does not understand everything well, but she knows she loves Amminippilla with her full heart. However, for Ammini it is not enough and files divorce through Adv. Pradeepan, an inexperienced, ambitious advocate who plans to enter in politics for a better future. The plot unveils the journey of late bloomer Ammini, Kanthi's fortitude, and Pradeepan's attempts to be recognized for being considered as a candidate by the party election.

== Cast ==
- Asif Ali as Adv.Pradeepan Manjodi
- Ahmed Sidhique as Sajith Kumar (Amminippilla)
- Fara Shibla as Kanthi Sivadasan
- Basil Joseph as Adv. Pilakul Shamsu
- Nirmal Palazhi as Mukesh Kumar / Mukeshan
- Ashwathy Manoharan as Nimisha/Nimmi
- Mamukkoya as Shanmughan
- Vijayaraghavan as Adv. R. P.
- Sudheesh as Prakashan Manjodi
- Sarasa Balussery as Pradeepan's and Prakashan's mother
- Sarayu Mohan as Psychologist
- Rajesh Sharma as Senior Party Member
- Srikant Murali as Judge Mathan
- Sajan Palluruthy
- Sudheer Paravoor as Aachi
- Lukman Avaran as Suran
- Babu Swamy as James Vakkeel
- P. Sivadas Kannur
- Balan Parakkal
- VP Khalid
- Shiny Rajan
- Babu Annur
- Unni Raja

== Production ==
=== Development ===
On 17 July 2018, The Times of India had first reported that Asif Ali would be teaming up with debutant director Dinjith Ayyathan for his next titled, Kakshi Amminippilla. It was also reported that the shoot for the film was set to begin from 20 August 2018 with a newcomer heroine alongside Asif. Sify said that the film deals with marriage and divorce issues, and Asif's character is a lawyer – politician who speaks in a Thalassery accent. In an interview with The New Indian Express writer Sanilesh Shivan said, "Asif plays a not-so-successful lawyer who, despite his passion and profession being diametrically opposite, has to stick to his profession owing to circumstances. He is involved in politics and has a family comprising a wife, mother, and brother. One day, a civil case falls into his lap and he sees in this a chance for redemption. The film traces the development of this case." In the movie, the role of Kanthi Sivadasan who plays Amminippilla's wife required the actress to be overweight. Newcomer Fara Shibla started preparing for the role in the film by putting on weight to portray the character. And as a result, she gained 20 kg and was finalized for the role.

On 2 September 2018, Asif himself launched the title poster online. It is the first time Asif Ali is playing a lawyer on screen.

=== Filming ===
Director Dinjith found Thalassery to be apt for his film's primary location as Asif's character possess political ideology that comes with using the Thalassery dialect. Principal photography of the film eventually commenced on 14 September 2018 in Thalassery and was planned to carry out for 40 days. Cinematographer Bahul Ramesh, editor Sooraj E. S., music composers Bijibal, Arun Muraleedharan and make-up artist Rasheed Ahammed joined the crew initially. Jakes Bejoy was officially added to the crew to compose the film's original background score. One of the music composers Bijibal was replaced later by debutant Samuel Aby. Swathanthryam Ardharathriyil fame Aswathy Manoharan was confirmed as Asif's heroine for the film. Ahmed Sidhique, director Basil Joseph and Vijayaraghavan were also added to the cast. Other primary filming locations were Kannur and Palani, Tamil Nadu.

== Soundtrack ==
Kakshi: Amminippilla

Soundtrack album by Arun Muraleedharan, Samuel Aby, Snehachandran Ezhikkara
- Released: 4 April 2019
- Recorded: 2019
- Genre: Feature film soundtrack
- Language: Malayalam
- Label: Goodwill Entertainments

The soundtrack features songs composed by Arun Muraleedharan and Samuel Aby. The background score is composed by Jakes Bejoy.

| No. | Title | Lyrics | Music | Singer(s) | Length |
|---|---|---|---|---|---|
| 1. | "Thalasserykkare Kandaal" | Manu Manjith | Samuel Aby | Musthafa, Judith Ann | 2:44 |
| 2. | "Uyyaram Payyaram" | Manu Manjith | Samuel Aby | Zia Ul Haq | 3:36 |
| 3. | "Chandam Thikanjoro" | Snehachandran Ezhikkara | Snehachandran Ezhikkara | Sudheer Paravoor | 2:41 |
| 4. | "Aval" | Rafeeq Ahamed | Arun Muraleedharan | K. S. Harisankar | 4:50 |
| Total length: | | | | | 12:71 |

== Marketing and release ==
Prithviraj Sukumaran released the first-look poster featuring Asif Ali through social medias on 18 January 2019. The official teaser was launched on the occasion of Asif's 33rd birthday (4 February 2019) through social media platforms. The Times of India wrote about the teaser that it "gives a glimpse into the whole plot of the film" and "shows the procedure of a court and how the professionals deal with it." Adding that it "will also generate laughter in audience." The first video song titled "Thalasserykkare Kandaal" was released on 4 April 2019 through Facebook by Mammootty. The second song "Uyyaram Payyaram" featuring Basil Joseph was released through social media platforms on 18 May 2019. The fast number sung by Zia Ul Haq, composed by Samuel Aby and penned by Manu Manjith gained praise from the audience. The third song, titled "Kallukudi Song" aka "Chandam Thikanjoro" was launched on 28 May 2019. The official trailer for the film was released online by Nivin Pauly on 3 June 2019.
