= Project Malabaricus =

Indian Music Band

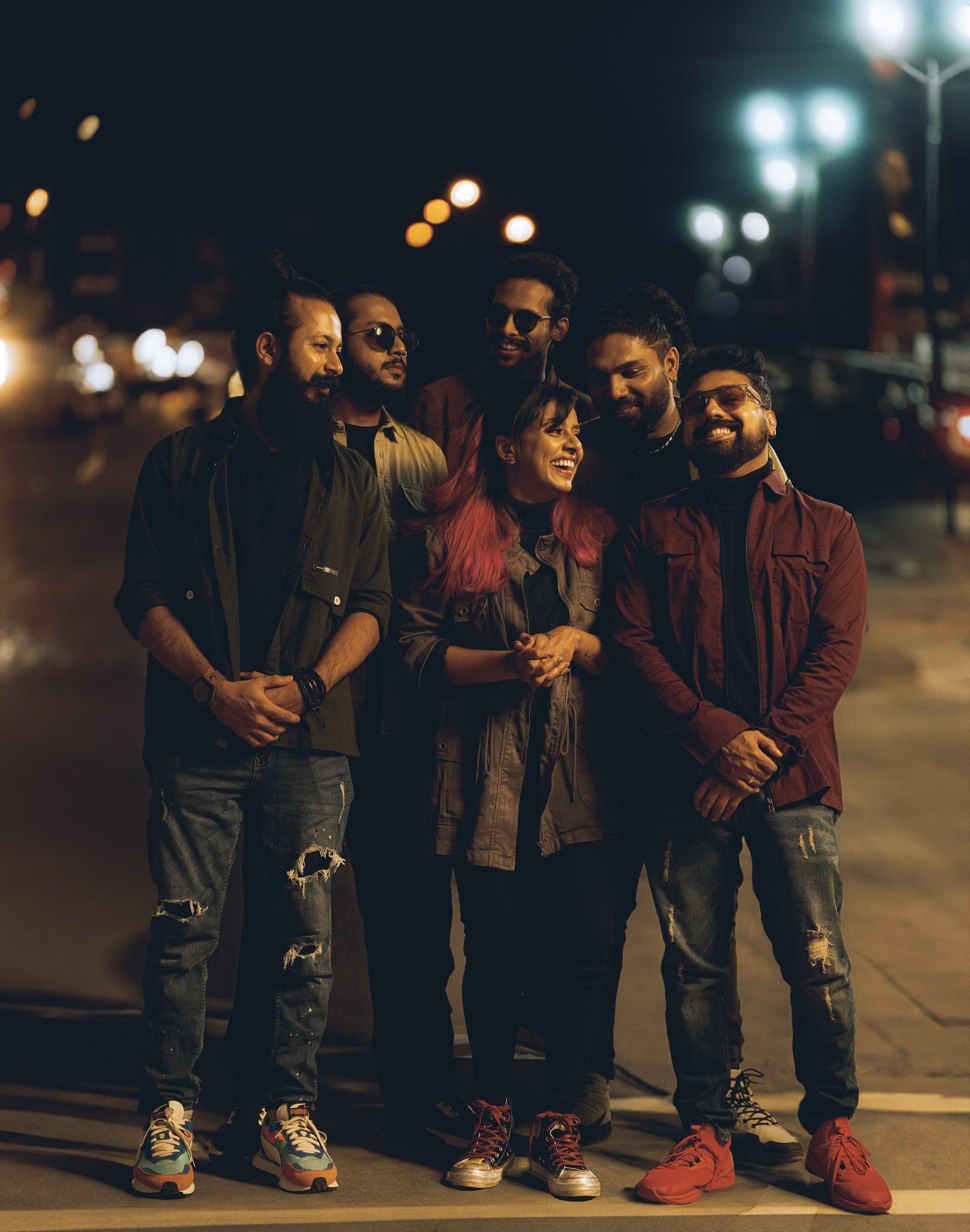
- Members (From Left): Ajay Krishnan, Midhun Paul, Vijo Job, Sithara Krishnakumar, Liboy Praisly Kripesh and Srinath Nair

Background information
- Origin: Kerala, India
- Genre: Indian rock
- Years active: 2017–present

Project Malabaricus is an Indian indian rock band from Kerala formed in 2017 by popular playback singer Sithara Krishnakumar. The band has been noted for exploring socially and culturally relevant narratives through their music. They have performed at over 250 stages, globally, since their inception. The band's debut indie project Rithu has the distinction to be the first album in Malayalam mixed in Dolby Atmos.

== Formation ==
Over the years Sithara Krishnakumar has collaborated with various popular musical bands in Kerala as well as collaborated in many stage shows, which include international shows as well. In 2014, she formed a musical band Eastraga, which focuses on a mix of female-oriented songs backed by a team of renowned musicians. Following a series of successful performances and covers with Eastraga, Sithara formed Project Malabaricus in 2017 with Liboy Praisly Kripesh to explore the horizons her interest in folk and fusion. Project Malabaricus, the 6 member band, is an independent venture that features contemporarised folk and classical songs. Collaborating with popular lyricists in the Malayalam music industry, Project Malabaricus releases originals that also explore various pertinent narratives such as women empowerment, Malabar folklore, environmental conservation, human resilience and cultural diversity. The band debuted with their album Rithu as Music Mojo Originals.

== Members ==
- Sithara Krishnakumar – Lead vocalist & founder
- Srinath Nair – Keyboard & vocals
- Liboy Praisly Kripesh – Rhythm guitar & founder
- Ajay Krishnan – Bass guitar
- Vijo Job – Lead guitar
- Midhun Paul – Drums

== Notable Discography ==
Year	Song	Lyricist	Notes
2017	Rithu	B K Harinarayanan	Music Mojo Original
2018	Iniyenthinu	Manu Manjith	Music Mojo Original
2019	Arutharuthu	B K Harinarayanan	Debut Project named Rithu. First Songs in Malayalam to be mixed on Dolby Atmos.
2019	Pilleranu	B K Harinarayanan	Debut Project named Rithu. First Songs in Malayalam to be mixed on Dolby Atmos.
2019	Chaayapattu	Muhsin Parari	Debut Project named Rithu. First Songs in Malayalam to be mixed on Dolby Atmos.
2020	Viswamake	Manu Manjith	COVID-19 Lock Down Project. Also known as Song of Valor.
2021	Kurayunilla	Kabir Ibrahim	Thodi project
2021	Paribhavam	Kabir Ibrahim	Thodi project
2023	Mohabbat	Malayalam by B K Harinarayanan	Bilingual Song
2023	Mohabbat	Tamil by Sangeeth Ravindran	Bilingual Song
2023	Onam Thiruvonam	B K Harinarayanan	
2024	Bhagavathi	Dr. Sajish M	

== Notable Shows ==
- Dubai Expo 2020
- Indiegaga Music Festival 2019
- South Side Story music Festival 2022 & 2023
- Kochi Biennale Closing Ceremony 2023
- High on music - USA, Canada, Australia, Uk, Ireland
- Urdu Festival
- International Indie Music Festival Kovalam 2022
