= Samuel Aby =

Indian music composer

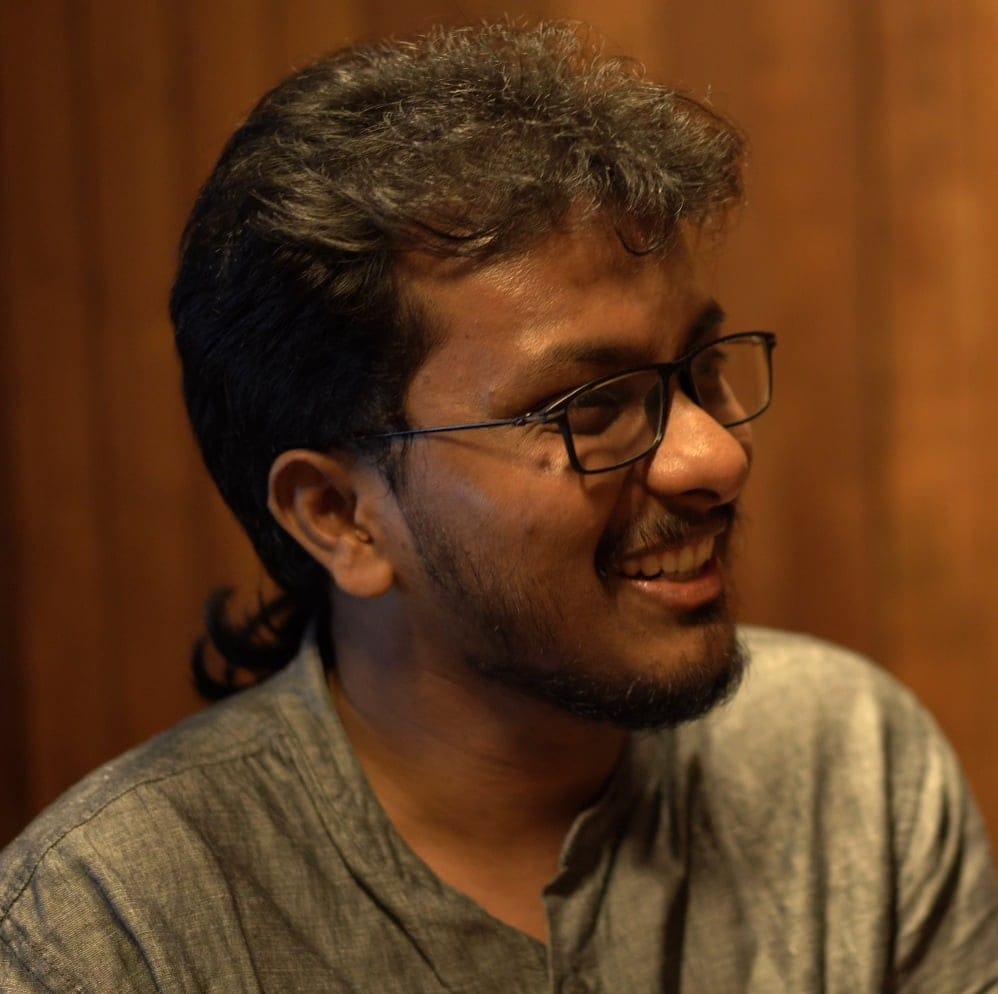

Background information
- Genres: Filmi; Film score; Electronic music; World music; Orchestral music
- Occupations: Film composer; Record Producer; Instrumentalist; Singer
- Years active: 2015–present
- Spouse: Angel Mary Joseph

Samuel Aby is an Indian music composer and music director from Kerala, India. He made his debut with the 2019 film Kakshi: Amminippilla starring Asif Ali. His second film was Manoharam starring Vineeth Sreenivasan. His song "Uyyaram Payyaram" from the film Kakshi Amminippilla was written by Manu Manjith, and went viral.

== Filmography ==
Year	Film	Score	Songs	Language	Notes
2019	Kakshi Amminippilla	No	Yes	Malayalam	2 Songs
2019	Manoharam	Yes	Yes	Malayalam	1 song Ee Maathra Ninne Feat. Rzee
2021	Better Half	Yes	Yes	Malayalam	Karikku Fliq Web Series
2023	Uschool	No	Yes	Malayalam	1 song "Kannalla Kannalla"
2023	Goujii Gammath	Yes	Yes	Tulu	
2024	Masthu Shades Unnai Raa	Yes	No	Telugu	
2024	Bharathanatyam	Yes	Yes	Malayalam	
2025	Anpodu Kanmani	Yes	Yes	Malayalam	
2025	Rippan Swamy	Yes	Yes	Kannada	
2026	Picture †	Yes	Yes	Tulu	
TBA	Ayel †	Yes	No	Malayalam	
