= Rippan Swamy =

Indian Kannada-language thriller film

- Theatrical release poster
- Directed by: Kishor Mudubidire
- Written by: Kishor Mudubidire
- Starring: Vijay Raghavendra; Ashwini Chandrasekhar
- Cinematography: Ranghanath C M
- Edited by: Shashank Narayana
- Music by: Samuel Aby
- Production company: Panchaanana Films
- Release date: 20 August 2025
- Country: India
- Language: Kannada

Rippan Swamy is a 2025 Indian Kannada-language thriller film directed by Kishor Mudubidire and starring Vijay Raghavendra and Ashwini Chandrashekar.

== Cast ==
- Vijay Raghavendra as Rippan Swamy
- Ashwini Chandrashekar as Mangala
- Prakash Thuminad
- Vajradheer Jain as Anand
- Yamuna Srinidhi as Sharadha
- Krishnamurthy Kavattaru
- Santhosh Shetty as Santhosh

== Soundtrack ==
The music was composed by Samuel Aby.

No.	Title	Lyrics	Singer(s)	Length
1.	"Koti Koti Jeeva Meeti"	Raghavendra V Kamath	Raghavendra V Kamath	4:44
2.	"Kadule Hutti Bandadu Nangave"	Girijana Samagra Abhivruddhi Kala Samsthe	Ramesh JB, Ajay J K, Kumara J G, Rajanna J M, Pranam J G, Udaya J R, Nithin J R, Ramakrishna J S, Prathap	2:18
3.	"Nanga Basuvi"	Girijana Samagra Abhivruddhi Kala Samsthe	Ramesh JB, Ajay J K, Kumara J G, Rajanna J M, Pranam J G, Udaya J R, Nithin J R, Ramakrishna J S, Prathap	1:57
Total length:				8:59

== Reception ==
Susmita Sameera of The Times of India rated the film 3/5 stars and wrote, "for those who enjoy slow-burn rural thrillers with atmospheric visuals and powerful performances, Rippan Swamy makes for a worthwhile watch". A critic from the Deccan Herald also gave the film the same rating. Y Maheswara Reddy of the Bangalore Mirror gave the film the same rating and wrote, "It is worth a watch for those who want to see Vijay Raghavendra in a different avatar". A Sharadhaa of The New Indian Express gave the film the same rating and wrote, "Rippan Swamy is a rural thriller with part folklore, part mystery, and part bloodbath. Admire it or detest it, you cannot walk away without carrying Rippan’s scars, and it is definitely not for the faint-hearted". Udayavani praised the director for selecting a serious story and narrating it in a crisp manner. A critic from Asianet Suvarna News called the film's story unique while criticising the lack of depth for the characters and intensity of events occurring in the film.
