= Kadina Kadoramee Andakadaham =

2023 Malayalam films

- Official poster
- Directed by: Muhashin
- Written by: Harshad
- Produced by: Naisam Salam
- Starring: Basil Joseph; Indrans; Jaffar Idukki
- Cinematography: Arjun Sethu; S. Mundol
- Edited by: Sobin Soman
- Music by: Govind Vasantha
- Production company: Naisam Salam Productions
- Distributed by: Rejaputhra
- Release date: 21 April 2023
- Country: India
- Language: Malayalam

Kadina Kadoramee Andakadaham (Malayalam: കഠിന കഠോരമീ അണ്ഡകടാഹം) is a 2023 Indian Malayalam-language film directed by debutant Muhashin and written by Harshad, known for Unda and Puzhu. Starring Basil Joseph, Indrans, Jaffer Idukki, and Sreeja Ravi in lead roles, the film is produced by Naisam Salam under the banner Naisam Salam Productions.

Set during the COVID-19 pandemic, the film follows Bachu, a young man determined to build a business at home despite family pressure to work abroad like his father. As the crisis unfolds, his choices bring financial and personal challenges, leading to a journey of loss, resilience, and irony.

Kadina Kadoramee Andakadaham received generally positive reviews for its emotional depth and realistic portrayal of life during the pandemic.

== Plot ==
Bashirudeen, known as Bachu, is an ambitious young man living with his mother and two sisters. His father, Kamar, has worked in the Middle East for 26 years but plans to return due to his declining health. The family pressures Bachu to take up his father's job under Ismail, his employer, but Bachu is determined to build a business at home. He runs a small-scale event company renting wedding equipment but struggles financially, owing investor Rajesh a profit share he couldn't pay due to COVID-19 restrictions. He keeps promising better returns once business picks up.

Meanwhile, Bachu's married sister Bushara is staying at their house due to marital issues. She secretly gives her necklace to her friend Vijeesh to pawn during an emergency. When the lockdown starts, this incident blows up, leading authorities to track Vijeesh's movements for possible COVID-19 contamination. Bushara's husband, Rashid, feels humiliated as she handed the jewelry to a male friend without his knowledge. Kamar, calling frequently from Qatar, urges Bachu to reconcile them, which irritates him, so he avoids talking to his father.

Bachu's former love, Baanu, now lives in Qatar with her husband, a marriage Bachu couldn't pursue due to his unstable career. Hoping to profit from the pandemic, he buys masks in bulk, funding the purchase by pawning his friend's wife Sumi's jewelry. After small sales, he secures a large order through Vijeesh's boss. With the payment, he repays Rajesh partially, hoping for future investments, and gives money to his mother to prove he doesn't need to go abroad.

Rashid arrives with mosque elders for a reconciliation, but when Bushara demands an apology for being doubted, he storms off. Their mother, increasingly worried, confides in Kamar, who struggles with worsening health and arranges to return on the Vande Bharat flight.

Trouble arises when the masks turn out defective. Vijeesh's boss demands a refund or legal action. Bachu tries to repair them and track his supplier, but the man is quarantined. Meanwhile, Sumi is due for delivery, and her jewelry must be returned. Under pressure, Bachu argues with his father over the situation. Kamar, frustrated, informs Bachu he is returning soon. Banu arrives from Qatar with her son.

Desperate, Bachu agrees to work abroad and borrows money from Ismail, retrieving the pawned jewelry. On his way home, police stop him for not wearing a mask. While arguing, he receives a call—his father has died of a heart attack in the Gulf a day before his scheduled flight. The family is devastated, waiting for his body's return. Banu informs Bachu that her husband is not on good terms with her.

With COVID-19 cases surging, body transport halts. Bachu, under pressure to allow the burial of the body abroad as per religious customs of burying as early as possible, fights to bring the body back, fulfilling his mother's wish to see Kamar one last time. After days of uncertainty, he secures clearance, but health officials restrict the reception to five people, prohibiting senior citizens. When the ambulance arrives, Bachu stops it outside their house, but medical staff refuse to let his mother see the body. A tense argument ensues until she insists they proceed to avoid further trouble. Eventually, she is permitted at the burial site, wearing PPE, where she and Bachu perform the last rites.

Seven months later, Bachu and Baanu are together, raising her child. As they pass an election rally with a massive crowd, Bachu smirks sarcastically at the irony of the so-called protocol restrictions.

== Cast ==
- Basil Joseph as Bashiruddeen "Bachu" Puthiyaprambil
- Parvathy R Krishna as Baanu
- Indrans as Hasaan
- Jaffar Idukki as Ismail
- Sudheesh as Rajesh
- Sreeja Ravi as Umma
- Binu Pappu as Rashid, Bachu's brother-in-law
- Johny Antony
- Fara Shibla as Bushara, Bachu's sister
- Nirmal Palazhi as Vijeesh
- Sneha Vijesh as Sumi

== Production ==
The first look poster of the film was released on 21 November 2022. The team announced that the film would be released in April for the Eid al-Fitr festival. The trailer was later released.

== Music ==
The music was composed, produced, and arranged by Govind Vasantha. Lyrics were written by Muhsin Parari, Sharfu, and Rafeek Thiruvallur a.k.a. Umbachy. The soundtrack features five songs and was released on 21 April 2023 by Think Music. The album, particularly the song "Premakkathu Pattu," received positive feedback from listeners and critics, who praised Govind Vasantha for his soulful compositions and Muhsin Parari for the deep lyrics.

Kadina Kadoramee Andakadaham

Soundtrack album by Govind Vasantha
- Released: 21 April 2023
- Recorded: 2022–2023
- Studios: NHQ Studios, Kochi
- Genre: Film soundtrack
- Length: 15:48
- Language: Malayalam
- Label: Think Music
- Producer: Govind Vasantha

Govind Vasantha chronology
Adi (2023)	Kadina Kadoramee Andakadaham (2023)	Jackson Bazaar Youth (2023)
External audio
- Original Motion Picture Soundtrack, from Spotify
- Audio Jukebox on YouTube

=== Track listing ===
All music is composed by Govind Vasantha.

Kadina Kadoramee Andakadaham
No.	Title	Lyrics	Singer(s)	Length
1.	"Kuthithiruki"	Sharfu	Govind Vasantha	02:33
2.	"Insha Allah"	Sharfu	Kapil Kapilan	04:10
3.	"Swargakkathu Pattu"	Rafeek Thiruvallur (Umbachy)	Govind Vasantha	03:05
4.	"Premakkathu Pattu"	Muhsin Parari	Fathima Jahaan	03:03
5.	"Ya Rabbe"	Rafeek Thiruvallur (Umbachy)	Mena Melath	02:55
Total length:				15:48

== Reception ==
Anjana George, a critic for The Times of India, gave the film 3 stars out of 5, stating that "It is a perfectly crafted family entertainer based on the pandemic." Vignesh Madhu, a critic for Cinema Express, noted, "No matter how kadina kadoram your heart is," and gave the film 3.5 out of 5. A critic from The Hindu described it as "an ideal festival release that emphasises the harmony of a coastal community that has not been fragmented by politics or religion; the film is a pleasant rewind to the days of the lockdown that we experienced in Kerala."
