= Manu Manjith =

Indian lyricist

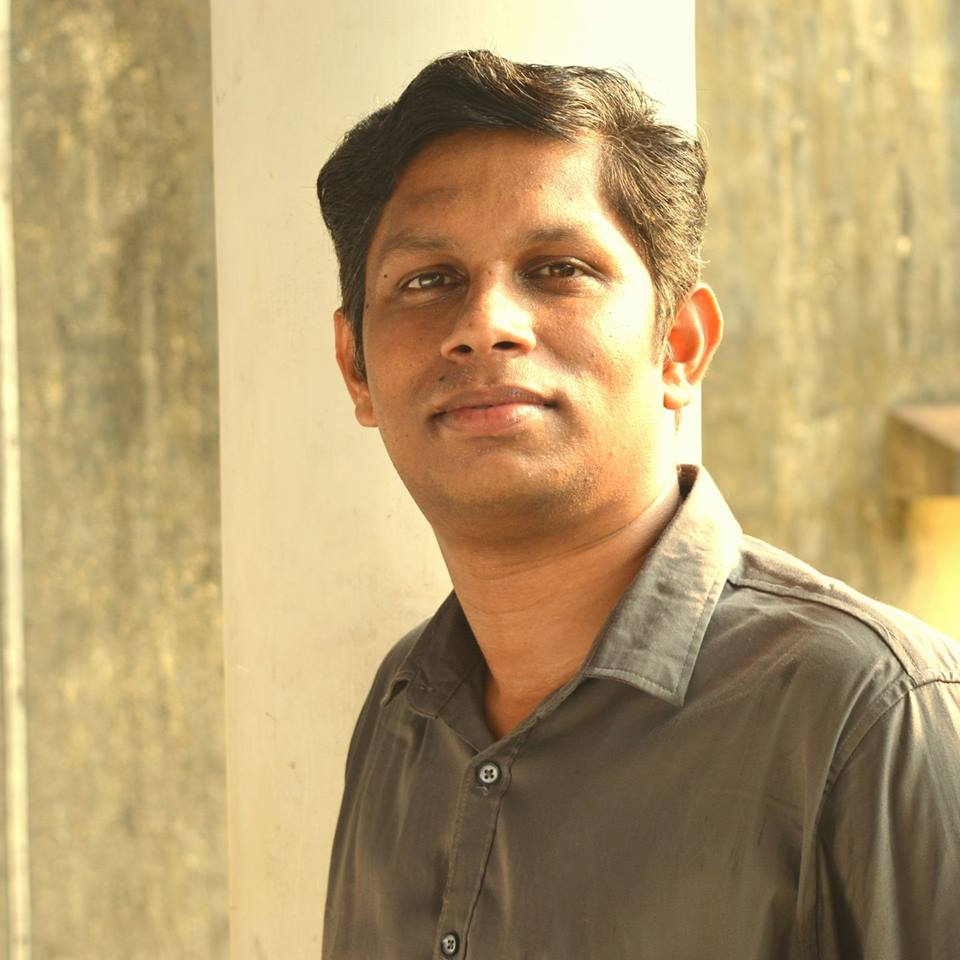
- Born: 24 January 1986 (age 40); Ulliyeri, Kozhikode, Kerala, India
- Occupation: Lyricist
- Years active: 2014–Present

Manu Manjith is an Indian lyricist and poet in Malayalam language. He is also doctor in Homeopathy Psychiatry. He began his film career with the Malayalam film Ohm Shanthi Oshaana in 2014. Since then, he has brought out many chart-toppers including "Neelambalin" from Oru Vadakkan Selfi to "Thiruvavaniraavu" from Jacobinte Swargarajyam. He is a frequent collaborator of Shaan Rahman since 2014. He is popularly known as Doctor Lyricist.

== Early years ==
After successfully completing his formal education, he joined Government Homoeopathic Medical College Calicut to do his course in Bachelor in Homoeopathic Medicine and Surgery. During his school and college days, he actively participated in Malayalam versification and story writing competitions.

== Filmography ==
=== As Lyricist ===
Year	Song	Film	Composer	Notes
2014	"Mandaarame"	Om Shaanthi Oshaana	Shaan Rahman	
2014	"Anthichoppil Raavum Pakalum"	Vikramaadithyan	Bijibal	
2014	"Vikramaadithyan"	Vikramaadithyan	Bijibal	
2014	"Doore Doore"	Ormayundo Ee Mukham	Shaan Rahman	
2014	"Chaayunnuvo"	Ormayundo Ee Mukham	Shaan Rahman	
2014	"Ee Mizhikalil"	Ormayundo Ee Mukham	Shaan Rahman	
2015	"Neelaambalin"	Oru Vadakkan Selfie	Shaan Rahman	
2015	"Kodi Kayarana Pooramaay"	Aadu	Shaan Rahman	
2015	"Chingiriyaadu"	Aadu	Shaan Rahman	
2015	"Salsa Song"	Kunjiramayanam	Justin Prabhakaran	
2015	"Thumbappoove Sundaree"	Kunjiramayanam	Justin Prabhakaran	
2015	"Ayyayyo Ayyayyo"	Kunjiramayanam	Justin Prabhakaran	
2015	"Paavaadathumpaale"	Kunjiramayanam	Justin Prabhakaran	
2015	"Ente Maavum Poothe"	Adi Kapyare Kootamani	Shaan Rahman	Co-writer: Shaan Rahman
2015	"Ithu Adimudi Marutha"	Adi Kapyare Kootamani	Shaan Rahman	
2015	"Ullaasagaayike"	Adi Kapyare Kootamani	Shaan Rahman	
2016	"Raavu Maayave"	Vetta	Shaan Rahman	Co-writer: Shan Johnson
2016	"Thiruvaavani Raavu"	Jacobinte Swargaraajyam	Shaan Rahman	
2016	"Pulari Veyilinaal" (Dubai)	Jacobinte Swargaraajyam	Shaan Rahman	
2016	"Chenthamara Chundil"	Style	Jassie Gift	
2016	"Oronnoronnayi"	Oru Muthassi Gadha	Shaan Rahman	
2016	"Naakkile Praakkukal"	Oru Muthassi Gadha	Shaan Rahman	
2016	"Minnaram Veyilil"	Idi	Rahul Raj	
2016	"Seythaante Cheytha"	Idi	Rahul Raj	
2016	"Theme Song"	Idi	Rahul Raj	
2016	"Ayyayyayyo"	Kasaba	Rahul Raj	
2016	"Mele Mukilodum"	Kochavva Paulo Ayyappa Coelho	Shaan Rahman	
2016	"Kurumbathi Chundari Nee"	Annmariya Kalippilaanu	Shaan Rahman	
2016	"Tharamai"	Annmariya Kalippilaanu	Shaan Rahman	
2016	"Oru Nattil"	Aanandam	Sachin Warrier	
2016	"Rathivilaasam"	Aanandam	Sachin Warrier	
2016	"Thoominnal"	Mudhugauv	Rahul Raj	
2016	"Umma"	Mudhugauv	Rahul Raj	
2016	"Rambo Song"	Mudhugauv	Rahul Raj	
2017	"Aaro Nenjil"	Godha (film)	Shaan Rahman	
2017	"Kannanjunnoru"	Godha (film)	Shaan Rahman	
2017	"Innalekalil"	Godha (film)	Shaan Rahman	
2017	"Wow"	Godha (film)	Shaan Rahman	
2017	"Welcome to Punjab"	Godha (film)	Shaan Rahman	
2017	"Kannetha Dooratholam"	Godha (film)	Shaan Rahman	
2017	"Kannetha Dooratholam"	Godha (film)	Shaan Rahman	
2017	"Aaro Nenjil" (Desi Mix)	Godha (film)	Shaan Rahman	
2017	"Innalekalil" (Treadmill Mix)	Godha (film)	Shaan Rahman	
2017	"Poovakum Neeyen"	Alamara	Sooraj S. Kurup	
2017	"En Thala Chuttanu"	Alamara	Sooraj S. Kurup	
2017	"Enthaanu Mone"	Adventures of Omanakuttan	Arun Muraleedharan	
2017	"Kasavaniyum"	Adventures of Omanakuttan	Dawn Vincent	
2017	"Nenje Nenje"	Kadamkadha	Deepankuran Kaithapram	
2017	"Mele Arimulla"	Velipadinte Pusthakam	Shaan Rahman	
2017	"Mele Arimulla"	Velipadinte Pusthakam	Shaan Rahman	
2017	"Thaalolam"	Solo (2017 film)	Agam (band)	
2017	"Minnunnunde Mullapole"	Tharangam (2017 film)	Ashwin Renju	
2017	"Enthelum Parayunnundel"	Tharangam (2017 film)	Ashwin Renju	
2017	"Shekara"	Aana Alaralodalaral	Shaan Rahman	
2017	"Sthothram"	Aana Alaralodalaral	Shaan Rahman	
2017	"Shaanthi"	Aana Alaralodalaral	Shaan Rahman	
2017	"Ee Angaadi Kavalayil"	Goodalochana	Shaan Rahman	
2017	"Changaathi Nannaayaal"	Aadu 2	Shaan Rahman	
2017	"Aadeda Aattam Nee"	Aadu 2	Shaan Rahman	
2017	"Kinnam Katta Kallan"	Kaly	Rahul Raj	
2018	"Kaalamellam"	Street Lights	Adarsh Abraham	
2018	"La La Laletta"	Mohanlal (film)	Tony Joseph Pallivathukal & Nihal Sadiq	
2018	"Va Va Vo"	Mohanlal (film)	Tony Joseph Pallivathukal	
2018	"Thoovenilla"	Mohanlal (film)	Tony Joseph Pallivathukal	
2018	"Naadum Vitte"	Mohanlal (film)	Tony Joseph Pallivathukal	
2018	"Changalla Changidipaane"	Mohanlal (film)	Sajid Yahiya, Prakash Alex	
2018	"Thoovenillaa" (Unplugged)	Mohanlal (film)	Tony Joseph Pallivathukal	
2018	"Kalyanam"	Kalyaanam	Prakash Alex	
2018	"Poomathe Ponnamma"	Udalaazham	Sithara (singer), Mithun Jayaraj	
2018	"Kripaakari Devi"	Aravindante Athidhikal	Shaan Rahman	
2018	"Oru Theeppettikkum Venda"	Theevandi	Kailas Menon	
2018	"Naadodikkaatte"	Oraayiram Kinaakkalaal	Ranjith Meleppatt	
2018	"Kilikalay"	Neeravam	Ranjin Raj Varma	
2018	"Mele Mele"	Neeravam	Ranjin Raj Varma	
2018	"Mama Sa Bibo"	Iblis (film)	Dawn Vincent	
2018	"Bum Bum Bum"	Iblis (film)	Dawn Vincent	
2018	"Bamba Bamba"	Iblis (film)	Dawn Vincent	
2019	"Kaattil Poomkaattil"	Sachin (film)	Shaan Rahman	
2019	"Kanneer Meghangal"	Sachin (film)	Shaan Rahman	
2019	"Thalasserykkare Kandaal"	Kakshi: Amminippilla	Samuel Aby	
2019	"Uyyaram Payyaram"	Kakshi: Amminippilla	Samuel Aby	
2019	"Ore Kannal"	Luca	Sooraj S Kurup	
2019	"Aliyukayayi"	Shibu movie	Sachin Warrier	
2019	"Pularum Vare"	Shibu movie	Sachin Warrier	
2019	"Oru Swapnam Pole"	Love Action Drama	Shaan Rahman	
2019	"Kudukku"	Love Action Drama	Shaan Rahman	
2019	"Shehnai"	Edakkad Battalion 06	Kailas Menon	
2019	"Mookamayi"	Edakkad Battalion 06	Kailas Menon	
2020	"Kamini"	Anugraheethan Antony	Arun Muraleedharan	
2020	"Bow Bow"	Anugraheethan Antony	Arun Muraleedharan	
2020	"Kanakinte Pushtakam"	Bhoomiyile Manohara Swakaryam	Sachin Balu	
2023	"Friendship Song"	Valatty	Varun Sunil	
2023	"Eeswaran Lunchinu"	Kurukkan	Unni Elayaraja	
2023	"Thee Kathana"	Kurukkan	Unni Elayaraja	
2023	"Subha Vibhathamayi"	Kurukkan	Unni Elayaraja	
2023	"Vattam Vattam Chuttathe"	Corona Dhavan	Rijo Joseph	
2023	"Kuruvi"	Jaladhara Pumpset Since 1962	Kailas Menon	
2023	"Ee Ulakin"	King of Kotha	Shaan Rahman	
2023	"Neela Nilave"	RDX: Robert Dony Xavier	Sam C. S.	
2023	"Halaballoo"	RDX: Robert Dony Xavier	Sam C. S.	
2023	"Konnadi Penne"	Nadhikalil Sundari Yamuna	Arun Muraleedharan	
2023	"Puthunaambukal"	Nadhikalil Sundari Yamuna	Arun Muraleedharan	
2023	"Pennu Kandu Nadannu Theyana"	Nadhikalil Sundari Yamuna	Arun Muraleedharan	
2023	"Kanninu Kann"	Nadhikalil Sundari Yamuna	Arun Muraleedharan	
2024	"Iyyeru Kanda Dubai"	Iyer In Arabia	Anand Madhusoodanan	
2024	"Sangamam"	Varshangalkku Shesham	Amrit Ramnath	
2024	"Vambanmarayi"	Bharathanatyam	Samuel Aby	
2024	"Vattamittu Chuttidunna"	Bharathanatyam	Samuel Aby	Trailer and End Credits (Short Song)
2024	Angu Vaana Konilu	ARM	Dhibu Ninan Thomas	
2024	Kiliye	ARM	Dhibu Ninan Thomas	
2024	"Kooriruttilu Kaalkulambadi"	ARM	Dhibu Ninan Thomas	
2024	"Maniya"	ARM	Dhibu Ninan Thomas	
2024	Pulliman Kannile	Hello Mummy	Jakes Bejoy	

=== As Script Writer ===
Year	Title	Language	Cast	Notes
2020	Varav	Malayalam	Tovino Thomas	

== Other works ==
In 2016 he wrote the lyrics for the official theme song of Manjappada, the largest supporters group of Kerala Blasters FC. The song was performed by Shabareesh Varma while Nikhil Thomas composed the song. In 2020, the wrote two songs for the Yennum Yellow, which is an album produced by Kerala Blasters as a tribute its fans. "Uyire" song from the movie Minnal Murali has received many applauds. He also redefined the style of devotional songs through his song Kripakari Devi from the movie Aravindante Athidhikal. Manu also collaborated multiple times with Project Malabaricus, the band formed by singer Sithara Krishnakumar.

== Awards ==
Mirchi Music Awards South:

- 2016 – Mirchi Music Awards for Best Lyricist – Jacobinte Swargarajyam - ''Thiruvavani Raavu''

South Indian International Movie Awards:

- 2018 – SIIMA Award for Best Lyricist – Godha (film) - ''Aaro Nenjil''

Gireesh Puthenchery Award:

- 2020 - Gireesh Puthenchery Award for best Lyricist Jacobinte Swargarajyam - ''Thiruvavani Raavu''
