= Get-Set Baby =

2025 Indian film

- Theatrical release poster
- Directed by: Vinay Govind
- Written by: Y. V. Rajesh; Anoop Ravindran
- Produced by: Sajiv Soman; Sunil Jain; Prakshali Jain
- Starring: Unni Mukundan; Nikhila Vimal; Shyam Mohan; Chemban Vinod Jose
- Cinematography: Alex J. Pulickal
- Edited by: Arju Benn
- Music by: Sam C. S.
- Production companies: Skanda Cinemas; Kingsmen Productions
- Distributed by: Aashirvad Cinemas (India)
- Release date: 21 February 2025
- Country: India
- Language: Malayalam
- Budget: ₹9.99 crore

Get-Set Baby is a 2025 Indian Malayalam-language comedy drama film directed by Vinay Govind and written by Y. V. Rajesh and Anoop Ravindran. The film stars Unni Mukundan, Nikhila Vimal, Shyam Mohan, Chemban Vinod Jose, Surabhi Lakshmi, Johny Antony, Sudheesh, Dinesh Prabhakar, Meera Vasudevan, Bhagath Manuel, Abhiram Radhakrishnan, Fara Shibla, Punya Elizabeth and Jewel Mary.

Principal photography commenced on 17 January 2024 in Kochi. The film features music composed by Sam C. S.

== Plot ==
A male gynaecologist, once the sole man in his medical college class, works in a female-dominated field. While facing career challenges, he develops feelings for someone who initially dislikes him but slowly warms up to him.

== Cast ==
- Unni Mukundan as Dr. Arjun Balakrishnan
- Nikhila Vimal as Swathi
- Shyam Mohan as Dr. Ranjith Karunakaran
- Chemban Vinod Jose as CI Rahim Abdul Rawther
- Surabhi Lakshmi as Sujatha
- Johny Antony as Surendran
- Sudheesh as Ravi
- Dinesh Prabhakar
- Meera Vasudevan as Dr.Shanti Prasannan
- Bhagath Manuel as Abraham
- Abhiram Radhakrishnan as Aji Mathew
- Fara Shibla as Aisha Rahim
- Punya Elizabeth as Dr.Gauri
- Jewel Mary as Sushmita Alexander
- Ganga Meera as Jancy
- Athulya Ashadam as Dr.Smita Sreelal
- Vijay Jacob as Balakrishnan KN
- KPAC Leela as Saraswati KN
- Krishna Prasad as Vasantham Sudhakaran
- Muthumani as Dr.Nalini Narayanan
- Varsha Ramesh as Sanjana
- Dileep Menon as Dr.Raghunath Pillai

== Production ==
=== Development ===
The film was officially announced in November 2022. The film marks the 4th directorial venture of Vinay Govind. On 16 December 2023, Vinay Govind announced that he will be collaborating with Unni Mukundan for this project. Sajiv Soman, Sunil Jain and Sam George jointly produced this movie under the banner of Skanda Cinemas and Kingsmen Productions. Alex J. Pulickal, known for RDX: Robert Dony Xavier (2023) and Driving Licence (2019), joined the team to handle cinematography and one of the prominent editors, Arju Benn was assigned to handle the editing.

=== Casting ===
After the films Jai Ganesh (2024) and Marco (2024), Unni Mukundan signed to play the lead role in this film. After Guruvayoor Ambalanadayil, Nikhila Vimal joined the set of Get-Set Baby to play the female lead with Unni Mukundan. Another lead role in this film was played by Chemban Vinod Jose. The cast also includes Surabhi Lakshmi, Johny Antony, and many other leading artists. After Premalu, Shyam Mohan is playing a supporting role in this film.

=== Filming ===
The filming began on 4 January 2024 with a puja ceremony held at the Chottanikkara Temple. The principal photography reportedly started on 17 January 2024. The film was shot in and around Kochi and Thodupuzha, with the shoot concluding on March 2, 2024. It took 45 days to complete the shoot.

== Marketing ==
The motion poster of the film was released on November 1, 2023. Later on, they revealed the cast list through social media handles. The promotions began after June.

== Music ==
The original background score and songs were composed by Sam C. S., who is known for RDX, Vikram Vedha, and Kaithi.

=== Track listing ===
No.	Title	Singer(s)	Length
1.	"Maname Aalolam"	Kapil Kapilan, Shakthisree Gopalan	3:36

== Release ==
The film was released theatrically on 21 February 2025.

== Reception ==
Rohit Panikker of Times Now gave the film three out of five stars and wrote, "The film is a fun and breezy visual experience that does not seek to complicate or confuse the audience with any gimmicks or twists in the tale. It's a simple story told with a lot of heart despite its confused and rushed-through narrative." Gopika I. S. of The Times of India gave it three out of five stars and wrote, "the writing falters in many places, and some tweaking could have helped drag the story out of its cliché comfort zone. To conclude, Get Set Baby is a watchable but average film."

Vivek Santhosh of The New Indian Express rated the film two out of five stars and wrote, "The film wants to be resolute but settles for being passable at best with low ambitions, unlike its protagonist. It has its share of moments with charm and tenderness, but its inability to delve deep into its core themes makes it feel like a half-baked effort. Get-Set Baby leaves you wishing its writing had undergone one more round of creative fertilisation before delivery." Anandu Suresh of The Indian Express rated the film one-and-a-half out of five stars and wrote, "Although the Unni Mukundan and Nikhila Vimal-starrer is set in largely endearing environments, the vibrancy and charm in its premise are missing in its execution."
