= Manoharam (2019 film) =

2019 Malayalam film written and Directed by Anvar Sadik

- Theatrical release poster
- Directed by: Anvar Sadik
- Produced by: Jose Chakkalakal; A.K. Sunil
- Starring: Vineeth Sreenivasan; Aparna Das; Basil Joseph
- Cinematography: Jebin Jacob
- Edited by: Nidhin Raj Arol
- Music by: Sanjeev T Samuel Aby
- Production companies: Chakkalakal Films; New Surya Fims
- Release date: 27 September 2019
- Running time: 137 minutes
- Country: India
- Language: Malayalam

Manoharam (transl. Beautiful) is a 2019 Indian Malayalam-language comedy-drama film directed by Anvar Sadik and produced by Jose Chakkalakal and A. K. Sunil . The film stars Vineeth Sreenivasan, Aparna Das, Basil Joseph, Deepak Parambol and Indrans. The music was composed by Sanjeev T and background score was done by Samuel Aby.

The movie follows Manoharan (Vineeth Sreenivasan), a struggling artist, who tries to prove his worth and gain respect for his profession. With painted posters losing their charm and flex printing gaining fast popularity, he is forced to venture into the digital world and learn new technology. The film made with a budget of 2.60 crores and collected 6 crores from the theatres. Disney Hotstar, Amazon prime and Goodwill entertainment bought the satellite, OTT and digital rights respectively for an aggregate amount of 4 crores.

The film was released on 27 September 2019.

== Plot ==
Manoharan, the protagonist of the story, is a talented and earnest artist. He hails from the lively town of Chittilamchery in Palakkad district, where no one takes his skill seriously. He earns a measly salary from painting walls and posters and consequently, on the day before his wedding, his fiancé elopes as she thinks Manu (as he is fondly called) does not provide any financial security.

Manu later finds out that his ex-fiancé had eloped with Vijay, who is the cousin of his childhood rival, Rahul. When he gets to know that Rahul is planning to start a printing unit in their village, Manu decides to get back his own. With the support of his mother and friends Prabhu and Varghese, Manu sets out to master the software needed for designing and open the first flex printing unit in his village before Rahul does. At the computer institute, Manu meets Sreeja, the newly appointed teacher who promises to teach him Photoshop. However, while Sreeja knows how to teach and use other advanced computer applications, Photoshop is uncharted territory for her.

She takes advantage of Manu's naivety in using a computer and stalls teaching him Photoshop. He gets suspicious and confronts her, which leads her to resign from the institute. When Manu gets to know about her not knowing Photoshop, they reconcile and she takes up the job again. Just as they start learning the software with textbooks and videos online together, Rahul offers to teach Sreeja the software, much to Manu's annoyance. Realising his opportunity of gathering intel about Rahul's plans of opening the printing unit, he decides to join Sreeja in learning Photoshop from Rahul, where Manu and Sreeja slowly develop a fondness for each other.

He simultaneously arranges for buying flex printing machines from Coimbatore, where he meets Ali bhai who promises to give him the machine at a cheap price. After thunder destroys the machines, Ali bhai flees which leads Manu to presume that he cheated him. He fears that he lost everything he invested in and that he would become the laughing stock of his village. He loads the machine onto his truck and gets it to his hometown despite it being unable to use.

Desperate to prove himself, he opens the flex printing unit in his hometown nevertheless and tricks people into believing that he prints the flex posters himself, when in reality he prints them in Coimbatore. Rahul and Vijay detect something fishy, and eventually his scam gets exposed and he loses his shop. To add insult to injury, Rahul sets up a new shop at the same place where Manu had his. Rahul's lack of creativity in designing the posters leaves his customers unsatisfied and hence, he is forced to ask Manu to work for him as a designer. Manu puts aside his pride and accepts the job. The local temple festival is a huge event, and Rahul gets the order for printing all the posters but Sreeja, who also works as a designer at Rahul's unit, causes a short circuit on the day of printing due to which the machine fails to work. Overwhelmed by the pressure of delivering the prints on time, Rahul gets furious at her folly.

Meanwhile, Ali bhai turns up on Manu's front yard. Although Manu rejects his offer to repair the machine as he believes he is not cut out for business, Ali bhai is adamant that Manu keeps the new parts in case Manu changes his mind.

None of the other printing units in the vicinity are ready to take up the work since they have work lined-up for the festival as well. Manu realises he could print them with his printer as long as he repairs it. Assuring Rahul that he would get the prints in good time, he calls Ali bhai and asks him to return. Ali bhai, however, is stuck in a traffic jam. Manu sets out to repair it himself, with Ali bhai guiding him through the phone, but the phone gets disconnected and he is forced to finish repairing it on his own. Rahul gets wind of Manu's undertaking and goes ballistic at the scene, remarking that Manu's complex has driven Manu insane. Rahul's use of the word 'complex' prompts him to recognise his mistake - he had forgotten to connect the combolux cables. This time, he succeeds and the prints are delivered on time. At the festival, the client, who had commissioned Rahul for the posters, is happy with the quality of the prints that Manu produced and asserts that he will give all the future projects to him. He humbly declines the offer and asks the client to give Rahul the projects.

When asked of his future plans, Manu reveals that he got a job at Lei Jing Multimedia, a leading game developing company and coincidentally, the place where Sreeja gets her new job. The film ends on a humorous note with Sreeja asking a co-worker whether their boss is married as the boss is seen flirting around Manu.

== Cast ==
- Vineeth Sreenivasan as Manoharan (Manu)
  - Gourav A Nair as Young Manu
- Aparna Das as Sreeja, Manu's love interest
- Basil Joseph as Prabhu
  - Adish Praveen as Young Prabhu
- Indrans as Varghese
- Deepak Parambol as Rahul
- Sreelakshmi as Thangam, Manu's mother
- Hareesh Peradi as Ottathara Prabhakaran, Manoharan's uncle
- Nandini Sree as Malathi
- Nisthar Sait as Vishwan
- Ahmed Sidhique as Vijay
- Delhi Ganesh as Ali Bhai
- Nathasha Shanavas as Lilly
- Kalaranjini as Sreeja's mother
- Neena Kurup as Manu's aunt
- Nandu as Joy
- V. K. Prakash as Rahul's father
- Jude Anthany Joseph as Sudheendran
- Baiju Ezhupunna as Sudhi
- Veena Nair as Herself

== Soundtrack ==
Manoharam

Soundtrack album by Sanjeev T
- Released: 2019
- Genre: Feature film soundtrack
- Length: 12:38

Singles from Manoharam
- 1. "Kinavo (sung by Sanjeev T and Swetha Mohan)"; 2. "Munnotithaa (sung by Sanjeev T)"; 3. "Thaaro (sung by Vineeth Sreenivasan)"; 4. "Akale (sung by Sid Sriram)"

The film's music was composed by Sanjeev T and the lyrics were penned by Joe Paul. Background score was done by Samuel Aby along with a rap song in the climax scene featuring Rzee.

No.	Title	Singer(s)	Length
1.	"Kinavo"	Sanjeev T, Swetha Mohan	3:25
2.	"Munnotithaa"	Sanjeev T	3:21
3.	"Thaaro"	Vineeth Sreenivasan	4:12
4.	"Akkale"	Sid Sriram	3:01
Total length:			13:59

== Release ==
Being a low budget, film had a limited release. It had its initial release in Kerala and few other centers outside the state on 27 September 2019. The movie is currently streaming on Amazon Prime OTT Platform.

== Reception ==
Anjana George of The Times of India rated the film with 3.5 stars out of five. She praised the movie being Manoharam as its title while applauding Vineeth Sreenivasan for his portrayal.

Navamy of The Hindu praised the film calling it "inherently good just like its hero".

Sajin Shrijith critic of Cinema Express gave 4 stars out of 5 and stated that "Go for it if you want to see something simple and uplifting--something that doesn't bore you with preachiness."

A critic from Firstpost noted that "Vineeth Sreenivasan plays a struggling artist in a nice though tame film" and gave 2.5 rating out of 5
