= Vinay Govind =

Indian film director

- Born: 3 March 1988 (age 38); Perinthalmanna, Kerala, India
- Occupation: Film Director

Vinay Govindankutty better known as Vinay Govind (born 3 March 1988) is an Indian film director. His first feature directional venture, Kili Poyi debuted on 1 March 2013. The film opened to mixed response from the critics, though found major fanfare among the youth. Kili Poyi is also one of the few stoner films produced in the country.

== Early life and education ==
Vinay was born in Perinthalmanna, a town in the Malappuram District of Kerala. He completed his high school in Presentation English Medium High School, Perinthalmanna. He graduated in visual communications from Loyola College, Chennai, a prominent institution in Southern India.

== Career ==
Vinay started his career in the advertising film industry before moving to being an associate director to V. K. Prakash. He debuted as an Assistant Director with Prakash's 2011 blockbuster Beautiful.

== Filmography ==
Year	Title	Role	Cast	Notes
2013	Kili Poyi	Director; Writer	Asif Ali, Aju Varghese	Debut film
2015	Kohinoor	Director	Asif Ali, Indrajith Sukumaran, Aju Varghese, Chemban Vinod Jose	
2025	Get-Set Baby	Director	Unni Mukundan, Nikhila Vimal	
