= Sanjeev T =

Background information
- Also known as: Sanjeev Thomas
- Born: 8 September 1980 (age 46)
- Occupations: Producer, Composer, Singer, Guitarist, Performer
- Instruments: Vocals, Guitar
- Years active: 2001-present
- Website: www.sanjeevt.com

Sanjeev T (born as Sanjeev Philip Thomas on September 8, 1980) is an Indian music producer, composer, singer, guitarist, and performer. Sanjeev’s music is an amalgamation of indie, rock, reggae, fusion, and jazz sounds. Currently, he is an independent music producer and also the founder and chief mentor at Rainbow Bridge, a music school and production studio in Bangalore. He is most known for his work as a lead guitarist with A.R. Rahman (2005 – 2015) and played for movies like Rockstar, Delhi-6, Vinnaithandi Varuvaya, Jaane Tu Ya Jaane Na, Blue, Endhiran and more. He also worked with Bollywood music directors Pritam and Anu Malik and other Indian music directors like Shaan Rahman, Ghibran and Leon James. He has also composed music for two Malayalam movies, Vilakkumaram (2017) and Manoharam (2019). Apart from his work in the movie industry, he has officially released three albums, Freewill (2012), Epic Shit (2013) and St. (2018) with the fourth album, Future, scheduled for release by 2021. Four singles from his next album, Future, have already been released.

Sanjeev has played and worked with musicians in India and globally including John Beasley, Taku Hirano, Oscar Seaton, Sivamani, Hariharan, Leslie Lewis, Sid Sriram and Rabbi Shergil.

Sanjeev is endorsed by Gibson Guitars (USA), Laney Amps (USA), Faith Guitars (UK) and D’Addario (US).

== Early life ==
Sanjeev was born and raised in Kuwait and completed his schooling from Carmel Convent. He subsequently attended Alpha College, Chennai and then graduated with a degree in Bachelor of Commerce (2001) from Madras University, Chennai. He is currently based in Bangalore and operates out of both Bangalore and Chennai.

== Career ==
Sanjeev’s musical journey began at an early age, and owing to a supportive family he was able to pursue his passion and began singing and playing the guitar when he was eight. His college years were instrumental in his decision to take up music as a career and after his graduation, he founded and performed with bands, Buddha’s Babies and Buddha Blown in Chennai. In 2004, Sanjeev established Rainbow Bridge in Chennai, a music production studio, to further his love for music and his passion to contribute to the music scene in India. In 2005, Sanjeev joined A.R. Rahman as a lead guitarist and toured with him across the globe for the next decade, working on many blockbusters with the Oscar and Grammy winning maestro. During this time, he also released two albums of his own, Freewill (2012) and Epic Shit (2013). Sanjeev also founded and led bands Rainbow Bridge (2005-2015), Kashmir with Baiju Dharmajan, and his collaborative act The Sanjeev T Collective has featured musicians like Naresh Iyer, Grammy winner Dr. Prakash Sontakke, and Baiju Dharmajan.

=== Springr ===
From 2012 to 2014, Sanjeev was involved with independent music platform and record label Springr in Kochi, Kerala. His album, Epic Shit was originally released under the Springr record label.

=== Rainbow Bridge ===
Rainbow Bridge was originally set up in Chennai as a studio by Sanjeev in 2004, but he also toured and performed with a band under the same name, featuring artists Benny Dayal, Keba Jeramiah, and Jeremaya Abraham John between 2005 and 2015. Soon after, he set up Rainbow Bridge in Bangalore in 2015 as a music school, production studio, and jam pad, which currently has more than 150 students and a dedicated crew of 15 musicians. Through Rainbow Bridge, Sanjeev has also collaborated with indie musicians like Brodha V, Gowry Lekshmi and Gubbi.

== Awards ==
Sanjeev was one of the five individuals nominated by the British Council of India in 2009 for the Young Entrepreneur in Music Award for his work with Rainbow Bridge. He was also named the Most Inventive, Innovative and Creative Indie Act in Asia at the prestigious AVIMA Awards in 2010 and also received an award in the Best Genre-bending Music category at the Indiego Awards in 2012 for his album Freewill. His album Epic Shit won Best Guitarist and Best Vocalist at the Jack Daniel’s & Rolling Stone Music Awards in 2013. Sanjeev was one of the first artists to be featured in MTV Unplugged and in the MTV Coke Studio series. His EP, St., was nominated at the 17th Independent Music Awards (IMA) in New York in 2019, under both world and instrumental categories.

== Discography ==
=== Guitarist ===
Year	Movie	Language	Music director
2007 2007	Sivaji Azhagiya Thamizh Magan	Tamil	AR Rahman
2008 2008 2008	Jaane Tu... Ya Jaane Na Ada... A Way of Life Ghajini	Hindi	AR Rahman
2009 2009	Delhi-6 Blue	Hindi	AR Rahman
2010	Ye Maaya Chesave	Telugu	AR Rahman
2010	Tournament	Malayalam	Deepak Dev
2010 2010 2010	Vinnaithaandi Varuvaayaa Raavanan Enthiran	Tamil	AR Rahman
2010 2010 2010	Raavan Robot Jhootha Hi Sahi	Hindi	AR Rahman
2011 2011 2011	Christian Brothers Urumi Teja Bhai & Family	Malayalam	Deepak Dev
2011	Rockstar	Hindi	AR Rahman
2012	Ekk Deewana Tha	Hindi	AR Rahman
2012	Grandmaster	Malayalam	Deepak Dev
2012	Thattathin Marayathu	Malayalam	Shaan Rahman
2015	I	Hindi	AR Rahman
2015	I	Tamil	AR Rahman
2015	I	Telugu	AR Rahman
2016	Anuraga Karikkin Vellam	Malayalam	Prashanth Pillai
2019	Saaho	Hindi	Ghibran
2019	Saaho	Tamil	Ghibran
2019	Saaho	Telugu	Ghibran
2019	Vaanam Kottattum	Tamil	Sid Sriram

=== Singer ===
Year	Song	Movie	Language
2010	Jessie’s Driving Me Crazy	Vinnaithaandi Varuvaayaa	Tamil
2012	Jessie’s Driving Me Crazy	Ekk Deewana Tha	Hindi
2012 2012 2012	Pathiye Pathiye Nenjin Ullil Thappana	Grandmaster Diamond Necklace Thappana	Malayalam
2013	Machi	David	Tamil
2013	Kaka	David	Telugu
2019	Munnotithaa	Manoharam	Malayalam
2019	Kinavo	Manoharam	Malayalam
2019	Easy Come Easy Go	Vaanam Kottattum	Tamil
2020	Kadhal Kozhappudhey	Oh My Kadavule	Tamil

=== Music Composer/ Background Score ===
Year	Movie	Language
2009	Bhagwan (Background Score only)	Malayalam
2017	Vilakkumaram	Malayalam
2018	Morjim (unreleased)	Hindi
2019	Manoharam	Malayalam
2019	Kalave Mosagara	Kannada

=== Independent Releases ===
Year	Name of Release	Format	Language
2010	Still Searching	Single	English
2012	Tanha	Single	Hindi
2012	Indian Jadoo (MTV Coke Studio)	Single	Hindi & Tamil
2012	Freewill	Album	Various
2013	Epic Shit	Album	Various
2018	St.	EP	Instrumental
2019	Freewill (Remastered) (Bonus Tracks included)	Album	Various
2019	Abhisshttu	Single	Tamil
2019	Maya	Single	Kannada
2020	Not A Love Song	Single	English
2020	Livin' Like It's Me	Single	English & Tamil
2020	Rain	Single	English
2020	Bure Khayaal	Single	Hindi
2021	Take My Life With You	Single	English
