= List of songs recorded by Vineeth Sreenivasan =

Vineeth Sreenivasan made his debut with Vidyasagar composition, "Kasavinte Thattamittu" from Kilichundan Mampazham in 2003. In 2005, he sang "Karale" for Deepak Dev in the film Udayananu Tharam where he lent his voice for his father, Sreenivasan which gained in popularity. He also recorded "Omanapuzha" for Vidyasagar and "Naran Theme" for Deepak Dev in the same year. He rose to prominence with the release of the song "Ente Khalbile" from Classmates (2006).

== Malayalam film songs ==
=== 2003 ===
Film	No	Song	Composer(s)	Writer(s)	Co-Singer(s)	Ref.	Note
Kilichundan Mampazham	1	"Kasavinte Thattamittu"	Vidyasagar	Beeyar Prasad	Sujatha Mohan		

=== 2004 ===
Film	No	Song	Composer(s)	Writer(s)	Co-Singer(s)	Ref.	Note
Wanted	2	"Kallayipuzha"	Deepan Chatterjee, Sanjeev Lal	Girish Puthenchery	Aparna Jayan		
Rasikan	3	"Maama Nee"	Vidyasagar	Gireesh Puthencherry	M. G. Sreekumar		

=== 2005 ===
Film	No	Song	Composer(s)	Writer(s)	Co-Singer(s)	Ref.	Note
Udayananu Tharam	4	"Karale Karalinte"	Deepak Dev	Kaithapram Damodaran Namboothiri	Rimi Tomy		
Chanthupottu	5	"Omanapuzha"	Vidyasagar	Vayalar Sarath Chandra Varma			
Naran	6	"Naran"	Deepak Dev	Kaithapram Damodaran Namboothiri	K. S. Chithra		

=== 2006 ===
Film	No	Song	Composer(s)	Writer(s)	Co-Singer(s)	Ref.	Note
Classmates	7	"Ente Khalbile"	Alex Paul	Vayalar Sarath Chandra Varma			
Kilukkam Kilukilukkam	8	"Kilukkam Kilukilukkam"	Deepak Dev	Gireesh Puthencherry			
Thuruppu Gulan	9	"Nee Pidiyana"	Alex Paul	Kaithapram Damodaran			
Rasathanthram	10	"Thevaram"	Ilaiyaraaja	Gireesh Puthencherry			
Chacko Randaaman	11	"Kamba Kamba"	Sundar C. Babu	Vayalar Sarath			
Speed Track	12	"Kokkokko"	Deepak Dev	Gireesh Puthencherry	Rimi Tomy		
Out of Syllabus	13	"Mayajalakathin"	Bennet–Veetraag	Rafeeq Ahamed			
Rashtram	14	"Puthu Vasantham"	Deepak Dev	Kaithapram Namboothiri			
Yes Your Honour	15	"Kunji Pennoru"	Deepak Dev	Vayalar Sarath			
Yes Your Honour	16	"Chellathumbile"	Deepak Dev	Vayalar Sarath			
Chakkara Muthu	17	"Karineela"	M. Jayachandran	Gireesh Puthencherry	Sujatha Mohan		
Notebook	18	"Hridhayavum Hridhayavum"	Mejo Joseph	Vayalar Sarath	Jyotsna		
Bhargavacharitham Moonam Khandam	19	"Puthuputhan"	Alex Paul	Vayalar Sarath			
Bhargavacharitham Moonam Khandam	20	"Bhargavacharitham Moonam Khandam"	Ouseppachan	Vayalar Sarath			

=== 2007 ===
Film	No	Song	Composer(s)	Writer(s)	Co-Singer(s)	Ref.	Note
Paradesi	21	"Ya Dhuni"	Shahabaz Aman	Rafeeq Ahammed	M. G. Sreekumar		
Inspector Garud	22	"Manmadhanalle"	Alex Paul	Vayalar Sharath	Rimi Tomy		
Inspector Garud	23	"Kannum Chimmi"	Alex Paul	Vayalar Sharath			
Chengathipoocha	24	"Sararanthal"	Ouseppachan	Gireesh Puthencherry	Manjari		
Vinodayathra	25	"Thenni Payum"	Ilaiyaraaja	Vayalar Sarath	Afsal		
Panthaya Kozhi	26	"Sankadathinu"	Alex Paul	Vayalar Sarath			
Big B	27	"Muthu Mazha"	Alphons Joseph	Jophy Tharakan	Jyotsna		
Athisayan	28	"Ennomalalle"	Alphons Joseph	Vinayan	Rimi Tomy		
Boss I Love You	29	"Etho Thamasha"	Kalyani Malik, Hari Anand	Rajeev Alunkal	Jyotsna		
Goal	30	"Manam Thelinja"	Vidyasagar	Vayalar Sarath	Jyotsna		
Arabikatha	31	"Tharaka Malarukal"	Bijibal	Anil Panachooran	Sujatha Mohan		
Challenge	32	"Kanne Kannadi"	M. M. Keeravani	Siju Thuravoor			
July 4	33	"Oru Vakku Minadathe"	Ouseppachan	Shibu Chakravarthy	Swetha Mohan		
Ore Kadal	34	"Nagaram Viduram"	Ouseppachan	Gireesh Puthenchery	Mammootty		
Indraneelam	35	"Enthinu Penne"	Ratheesh Kannan	Yusufali Kechery			
Veeralipattu	36	"Aalilayum"	Vishwajith	Vayalar Sarath	Manjari		
Aayur Rekha	37	"Indhumukhee"	Sabeesh George	O. N. V. Kurup			
Flash	38	"Nin Hridayamounam"	Gopi Sundar	Rafeeq Ahamed			
Katha Parayumbol	39	"Mambullikavil"	M. Jayachandran	Gireesh Puthencherry	Swetha Mohan		
Kangaroo	40	"Oru Kaanakanavin"	Saji Ram	Biju Kaipparedan			
Chocolate	41	"Manodum Thazhvaram"	Alex Paul	Vayalar Sarath			
Thakarachenda	42	"Ithu Nalla Kanamalla"	Sibi Kruvila	Vijeesh Calicut			

=== 2008 ===
Film	No	Song	Composer(s)	Writer(s)	Co-Singer(s)	Ref.	Note
Cycle	44	"Varna Painkili"	Mejo Joseph	Anil Panachooran			
Cycle	45	"Puthiyoreenam"	Mejo Joseph	Anil Panachooran	Karthik		
Cycle	46	"Kanaponnin"	Mejo Joseph	Anil Panachooran	Cicily		
Annan Thambi	47	"Kanmaniye Punyam"	Rahul Raj	Vayalar Sarathchandra Varma			
Gopalapuranam	48	"Neelanilapoothinkal"	Younuseo				
Pachamarathanalil	49	"Janmatheeratengo"	Alphonse Joseph	Vayalar Sarathchandra Varma			
Jubilee	50	"Shaarike"	Shyam Dharman	Kaithapram Damodaran Namboothiri			
Jubilee	51	"Aaranu Nee"	Shyam Dharman	Kaithapram Damodaran Namboothiri			
Shakespeare M.A. Malayalam	52	"Akkam Pakkam"	Mohan Sithara	Anil Panachooran	Sheela Mani, Dr Satheesh Bhatt		
Aandavan	53	"Poonila Punchiri"	Alex Paul	Bappu Veliparambu			
Minnaminnikoottam	54	"We are in Love"	Bijibal	Anil Panachooran	Karthik, Sayanora Philip, Soumya Ramakrishnan		
Anthiponvettam	55	"Koonillakunnin"	M Jayachandran	Dr SP Ramesh			
Kabadi Kabadi	56	"Njanoru Rajavaayal"	Nadirshah	Nadirshah	Rimi Tomy		
Mayabazar	57	"Jillu Jillu"	Rahul Raj	Vayalar Sarathchandra Varma	Cicily, Sayanora Philip		
LollyPop	58	"Rajakumari"	Alex Paul	Vayalar Sarathchandra Varma	Anitha		
The Target	59	"Neeyen Swapnamaay"	Mani Sharma	Mankombu Gopalakrishnan, Siju Thuravoor	Divya Nair		
Kanal	60	"Manassile Mazhayaakaam"	Chakri	Rajeev Alunkal	Manjari		
SMS	61	"Innalle Muttathu Kinnaaram"	Ilaiyaraaja	Vayalar Sarathchandra Varma	Binni Krishnakumar, Rakesh Brahmanandan, Vidhu Prathap		
Twenty:20	62	"Sa Ri Ga Ma Pa"	Berny–Ignatius	Gireesh Puthenchery	K. J. Yesudas, Madhu Balakrishnan, Afsal, Franco, Jassie Gift, K. S. Chithra, Sujatha Mohan, Jyotsna Radhakrishnan, Rimi Tomy, Anitha		

=== 2009 ===
Film	No	Song	Composer(s)	Writer(s)	Co-Singer(s)	Ref.	Note
Makante Achan	63	"Ee Vennilavinte Geetham"	M Jayachandran	Kaithapram			
Makante Achan	64	"Othorumichoru"	M Jayachandran	Anil Panachooran			
Paribhavam	65	"Kulirengum Thooviyethum"	Jai Kishan	Aparna Karimbil			
Kadha, Samvidhanam Kunchakko	66	"Neela Koovala"	M Jayachandran	Gireesh Puthenchery	Rajalakshmy		
Ithu Nangalude Lokham	67	"Ninakkaay"	Mickey J Meyer	Siju Thuravoor			
2 Harihar Nagar	68	"Unnam Marannu"	Alex Paul, S Balakrishnan	Bichu Thirumala	Ramesh Babu		
Calendar	69	"Pacha Vellam"	Afsal Yusuf	Anil Panachooran			
Passenger	70	"Oorma Thirivil"	Bijibal	Anil Panachooran			
Ee Pattanathil Bhootham	71	"Aaro Nilavayi"	Shaan Rahman	Gireesh Puthenchery	Shweta Mohan		
Parayaan Marannathu	72	"Nee Konjum"	Arun Siddharth	Poovachal Khader	Manjari, Sreejith		
Keralolsavam Mission 2009	73	"Mrithipaadam"	Shyam Dharman	Vayalar Sarathchandra Varma			
Kappal Muthalaali	74	"Ithuvare"	Sumesh Anand	Anil Panachooran	Anupama Vijay		
Currency	75	"Kashmir Poove"	Sidharth Vipin	Vayalar Sarathchandra Varma	Vandana Sreenivasan		
Aayiram Varnangal	76	"Minnal Ithu Minnal"	Abhishek Ray	Vasan	Chandrasekharan, Vineetha, Jyothi Gokul		
Aayiram Varnangal	77	" Njaanaadyam Ninne"	Abhishek Ray	Vasan	Deepa Miriam		

=== 2010 ===
Film	No	Song	Composer(s)	Writer(s)	Co-Singer(s)	Ref.	Note
Malarvaadi Arts Club	78	"Manya Maha Janangale"	Shaan Rahman	Vineeth Sreenivasan	Sachin Warrier, Rajesh Menon		
Malarvaadi Arts Club	79	"Lavan Kashmalan"	Shaan Rahman	Vineeth Sreenivasan	Sharreth, Rakesh Kishore, Shaan Rahman		
Malarvaadi Arts Club	80	"Ayiram Katham"	Shaan Rahman	Vineeth Sreenivasan	Divya S. Menon, Sachin Warrier, Shaan Rahman		
Malarvaadi Arts Club	81	"Innori Mazhayil"	Shaan Rahman	Vineeth Sreenivasan	Rahul Nambiar		
Malarvaadi Arts Club	82	"Changayi"	Shaan Rahman	Vineeth Sreenivasan	Sujatha Mohan		
Ringtone	83	"Neelaponmaane"	Shaan	Joffy Tharakan	Shweta Mohan		
Pullimaan	84	"Thanthaaneno"	Sharreth	Vayalar Sarathchandra Varma			
Annaarakkannanum Thannaalaayathu	85	"Punnarapachakkiliye"	Nikhil Prabha		Rimi Tomy		
Valiyangadi	86	"Kinaavilinnoru"	Sayan Anwar	Vayalar Sarathchandra Varma			
Plus Two	87	"Vellaaram Kannulla"	Manu Ramesan	S. Ramesan Nair	Manjari		
Again Kasarkode Kadarbhai	88	"Parayaruthe"	Ratheesh Vegha	Vayalar Sarathchandra Varma	Thulasi Yatheendran		

=== 2011 ===
Film	No	Song	Composer(s)	Writer(s)	Co-Singer(s)	Ref.	Note
Doctor Love	89	"Avanalle"	Vinu Thomas	Vayalar Sarath Chandra Varma	Ranjith, Franco Simon, Balu Thankachan, Vipin Xavier, C. J. Kuttappan, Namitha		
Doctor Love	90	"Kai Onnadichen"	Vinu Thomas	Vayalar Sarath Chandra Varma	Rimy Tomy, C. J. Kuttappan		

=== 2012 ===
Film	No	Song	Composer(s)	Writer(s)	Co-Singer(s)	Ref.	Note
Orange	91	"Neerpalunkumzhi"	Manikanth Kadri	Rafeeq Ahamed	Shweta Mohan		
Casanovva	92	"Omanichumma"	Gopi Sundar	Girish Puthenchery	Karthik, Najim Arshad, Roopa Revathi, Kalyani, Gopi Sundar		
Ennennum Ormmakkayi	93	"Kaiyyil Kai Cherum"	Saiju Ranju	Vayalar Sarath Chandra Varma, Santhosh Varma			
Spanish Masala	94	"Akkare Ninnoru Poonkaatu"	Vidyasagar	R. Venugopal	Sujatha Mohan		
Padmasree Bharat Dr. Saroj Kumar	95	"Kesu Ninte"	Deepak Dev	Anil Panachooran	Shweta Mohan		
Padmasree Bharat Dr. Saroj Kumar	96	"Iniyoru Chalanam"	Deepak Dev	Anil Panachooran	Shaan		
Thattathin Marayathu	97	"Anuraagathin Velayi"	Shaan Rahman	Vineeth Sreenivasan			
Thattathin Marayathu	98	"Shyaamambaram"	Shaan Rahman	Anu Elizabeth Jose			
Thattathin Marayathu	99	"Aayiram Kannumayi"	Jerry Amaldev	Bichu Thirumala			
Thattathin Marayathu	100	"Oh Sahiba – Theme Song"	Shaan Rahman	Traditional			
Outsider	101	"Athirukalariyaathengo"	Sangeeth	Engandiyoor Chandrasekharan			
Bhoopadathil Illatha Oridam	102	"Pranayaswaram"	Mohan Sithara	Rafeeq Ahamed			
Theevram	103	"Innariyathe"	Roby Abraham	Arun K Narayanan	Shweta Mohan		

=== 2013 ===
Film	No	Song	Composer(s)	Writer(s)	Co-Singer(s)	Ref.	Note
Paisa Paisa	104	"Iravino Pakalino"	Aby Salvin	D Santhosh			
Mr Bean - The Laugh Riot	105	"Neeyoru Vasanthamaay"	MR Rajakrishnan	Padmaja Radhakrishnan	Shweta Mohan		
Thira	106	"Theeraathe Neelunne"	Shaan Rahman	Anu Elizabeth Jose			
Pottas Bomb	107	"Chillam Chillada"	Mohan Sithara	Vayalar Sarath Chandra Varma			

=== 2014 ===
Film	No	Song	Composer(s)	Writer(s)	Co-Singer(s)	Ref.	Note
Parayan Baaki Vechathu	108	"Iru Hrudayam Onnay"	Thej Mervin	Yusufali Kechery	Neena Nazar		
Ohm Shanthi Oshaana	109	"Kaatu Mooliyo"	Shaan Rahman	B. K. Harinarayanan			
Polytechnic	110	"Assalumundiriye"	Gopi Sundar	Nishad Ahamed			
God's Own Country	111	"Mannil Pathiyum"	Gopi Sundar	Anu Elizabeth Jose	Divya S Menon		
Ormayundo Ee Mukham	112	"Doore Doore"	Shaan Rahman	Vineeth Sreenivasan			
Ormayundo Ee Mukham	113	"Ee Mizhikalin"	Shaan Rahman	Manu Manjith	Mridula Warrier		
To let Ambadi Talkies	114	"Surumakalezhuthiya"	Magnus Music Band	Capt. Suneer Hamsa			

=== 2015 ===
Film	No	Song	Composer(s)	Writer(s)	Co-Singer(s)	Ref.	Note
Oru Vadakkan Selfie	115	"Enne Thallendammaava"	Shaan Rahman	Vineeth Sreenivasan	Shaan Rahman		
Oru Vadakkan Selfie	116	"Chennai Pattanam"	Shaan Rahman	Vineeth Sreenivasan			
Premam	117	"Aluva Puzhayude"	Rajesh Murugesan	Shabareesh Varma			
Oru Second Class Yathra	118	"Ambazham Thanalitta"	Gopi Sundar	B. K. Harinarayanan	Mridula Warrier		
You Too Brutus	119	"Ettum Pottum"	Roby Abraham	Rafeeq Ahamed			
Kunjiramayanam	120	"Ayyayyo Ayyayyo"	Justin Prabhakaran	Manu Manjith			
Anarkali	121	"Aa Oruthi Aval Oruthi"	Vidyasagar	Rafeeq Ahamed, Rajeev Nair	Manjari		
Kohinoor	122	"Dum Dum Dum"	Rahul Raj	B. K. Harinarayanan			
Rajamma @ Yahoo	123	"Ullathu Chonnaal"	Bijibal	Anil Panachooran	Sangeetha Prabhu		
Adi Kapyare Kootamani	124	"Ende Maavum Poothe"	Shaan Rahman	Manu Manjith, Rzee	Arun Alat, Shaan Rahman, Rzee		

=== 2016 ===
Film	No	Song	Composer(s)	Writer(s)	Co-Singer(s)	Ref.	Note
Action Hero Biju	125	"Chiriyo Chiri Punchiri"	Jerry Amaldev	BK Harinarayanan	Vaikom Vijayalakshmi		
Aakashavani	126	"Doorangal Thaandippokum"	Anil Gopalan	Sabeena Shajahan			
Jacobinte Swargarajyam	127	"Ee Shishirakaalam"	Shaan Rahman	BK Harinarayanan	Kavya Ajit		
Jacobinte Swargarajyam	128	"Dubai"	Shaan Rahman	Manu Manjith	Suchith Suresan, Liya Varghese		
Oru Murai Vanthu Parthaya	129	"Muzhuthingal"	Vinu Thomas	K.R Narayanan			
Annmariya Kalippilaanu	130	"Kurumbathi Chundari nee"	Shaan Rahman	Manu Manjith			
Pretham	131	"Oruthikku Pinnil"	Anand Madhusoodanan	Rafeeq Ahamed			
Oru Muthassi Gadha	132	"Thennal Nilavinte"	Shaan Rahman	B.K Harinarayanan	Aparna Balamurali		
Valleem Thetti Pulleem Thetti	133	"Enno Kaathil"	Sooraj S Kurup	Sooraj S Kurup			
Happy Wedding	134	"Thennithenni"	Arun Muraleedharan	B.K. Harinarayanan	Najim Arshad		
Ore Mukham	135	"Sadirumaay"	Bijibal	Lalji Kattiparamban			
Dum	136	"Ennodu"	Jassie Gift	Vayalar Sarath Chandra Varma			
Aanandam	137	"Oru Naattil"	Sachin Warrier	Manu Manjith	Apoorva Bose		
Aanandam	138	"Rathivilaasam"	Sachin Warrier	Manu Manjith			

=== 2017 ===
Film	No	Song	Composer(s)	Writer(s)	Co-Singer(s)	Ref.	Note
Avarude Raavukal	139	"Pettupokumo"	Shankar Sharma	Sibi Padiyara			
Godha	140	"Manayathu Vayalum Gusthiyum"	Shaan Rahman	Basil Joseph			
Ayaal Sassi	141	"Sassipattu"	Basil CJ	V Vinayakumar			
Aby	142	"Onnurangi"	Bijibal	Rafeeq Ahamed	Saritha Ram		
C/O Saira Banu	143	"Hrudayavaathil"	Mejo Joseph	B.K. Harinarayanan	Jyotsna Radhakrishnan		
Puthan Panam	144	"Va Va Vaikaathe"	Shaan Rahman	Rafeeq Ahamed			
Oru Cinemakkaran	145	"Kannake"	Bijibal	Santhosh Varma	Teenu Tellance		
Velipadinte Pusthakam	146	"Entammede Jimikki Kammal"	Shaan Rahman	Anil Panachooran	Ranjith Unni		
Punyalan Private Limited	147	"Naalu Kompulla Kunjaana"	Anand Madhusoodanan	Santhosh Varma			
Cappuccino	148	"Janah Meri Janah"	Hesham Abdul Wahab	Haseena Kanam			
Aana Alaralodalaral	149	"Shaanthi"	Shaan Rahman	Manu Manjith			
Vishwa Vikhyatharaya Payyanmar	150	"Thaa Theyyam"	Santhosh Varma, Vishal Arun Ram	Santhosh Varma, Sasheendran Payyoli	Arun Alat, Najim Arshad, Sangeeth, Raghu, Soumya		
Chembarathipoo	151	"Kannil Kannonnu"	A.R Rakesh	Jinil Jose	Haritha Balakrishnan		

=== 2018 ===
Film	No	Song	Composer(s)	Writer(s)	Co-Singer(s)	Ref.	Note
Aravindante Athidhikal		"Kanne Thai Malare"	Shaan Rahman	B. K. Harinarayanan			
Aravindante Athidhikal		"Raasaathi"	Shaan Rahman	B. K. Harinarayanan	Liya Susan Varghese		
Oru Pazhaya Bomb Kadha		"Moovandan Manchottil"	Arunraj	B. K. Harinarayanan			

=== 2019 ===
Film	No	Song	Composer(s)	Writer(s)	Co-Singer(s)	Ref.	Note
June		"Thenkiliye"	Ifthikar Ali	Vinayak Sasikumar			
Oru Adaar Love		"Manikya Malaraya Poovi"	Shaan Rahman	PMA Jabbar			
Oru Adaar Love		"Aarum Kaanaathinnen"	Shaan Rahman	B. K. Harinarayanan			
Helen		"Pon Thaarame"	Shaan Rahman	Vinayak Sasikumar	Divya Vineeth		
Helen		"Praanante"	Shaan Rahman	Manu Manjith			
Love Action Drama		"Churulariyaatha"	Shaan Rahman	Vineeth Sreenivasan			
Love Action Drama		"Kudukku"	Shaan Rahman	Manu Manjith			

=== 2021 ===
Film	No	Song	Composer(s)	Writer(s)	Co-Singer(s)	Ref.	Note
Saajan Bakery Since 1962		"Thora Mazhayilum"	Prashant Pillai	Anu Elizabeth Jose	Preethi Pillai		
Grahanam		"Mizhinilavai"	G Anand Kumar	Linku Abraham			
Marathon		"Oru Thoomazhayil"	Bibin Ashok	Ajith Balakrishnan			
Sara's		"Varavayi Nee"	Shaan Rahman	Joe Paul	Divya Vineeth		
Sara's		"Nenjame Nenjame"	Shaan Rahman	Joe Paul	Gowry Lekshmi		
#Home		"Itha Vazhi Maariyodunnu"	Rahul Subrahmanian	Shyam Muraleedharan, Arun Alat	Arun Alat		
Marakkar - Arabikadalinte Simham		"Kannil Ente"	Ronnie Raphael	B. K. Harinarayanan, Shafi Kollam	Shweta Mohan, Zia Ul Haq		

=== 2022 ===
Film	No	Song	Composer(s)	Writer(s)	Co-Singer(s)	Ref.	Note
Hridayam		"Manasse Manasse"	Hesham Abdul Wahab	Kaithapram Damodaran Namboothiri			
Hridayam		"Onakka Munthiri"	Hesham Abdul Wahab	Vineeth Sreenivasan	Divya Vineeth		
Bro Daddy		"Parayathe Vannen"	Deepak Dev	Lakshmi Shrikumar	M.G. Sreekumar		
Elza		"Achante Sundari"	Jibin George Sebastian	Saan			

=== 2023 ===
Film	No	Song	Composer(s)	Writer(s)	Co-Singer(s)	Ref.	Note
Kurukkan		"Thee Kathana Kannalivan"	Unni Elayaraja	Manu Manjith			
Pappachan Olivilanu		"Kayyethum Dhoorath"	Ouseppachan	Sinto Sunny			
Nadhikalil Sundari Yamuna		"Kanninu Kann"	Arun Muraleedharan	Manu Manjith	Jithin Raj		
Tholvi F.C.		"Hey Nin Punchiri"	Vishnu Varma	Vinayak Sasikumar			

=== 2024 ===
Film	No	Song	Composer(s)	Writer(s)	Co-Singer(s)	Ref.	Note
Qalb		"Qalbee"	Vimal Nazar	Suhail Koya			
Raastha		"Varminnal"	Vishnu Mohan Sithara	B. K. Harinarayanan	Mridula Warrier		
Palayam PC		"Massum Mashum"	Sadique Pandallur	Akhila Sayooj			
Little Hearts		"Kannin Kannay"	Sourav Suresh	Pranav Suresh			
Jerry		"Nee Pinangalle"	Arun Vijay	Vinayak Sasikumar	Nithya Mammen		
Vayasethrayaayi? Muppathiee..!!		"Puyyappala Thakkarathinu"	Sanfeer K	Sanfeer K			
Vayasethrayaayi? Muppathiee..!!		"Para Niraye Ponnunde"	Sibu Sukumaran	Kaithapram			
Varshangalkku Shesham		"Madhu Pakaroo"	Amrit Ramnath	Vineeth Sreenivasan	Amrit Ramnath, Devu Khan Manganiyar		
Varshangalkku Shesham		"Karakaana"	Amrit Ramnath	Vaisakh Sugunan	Divya Vineeth		
Jai Ganesh (film)		"Prakashangale"	Shankar Sharma	B. K. Harinarayanan			
Malayalee From India		Krishna Song	Jakes Bejoy	Titto P. Thankachen			
Bad Boyz		Ghora Ghora Rajadhi Raja	William Francis	BK Harinayanan	Pranavam Sasi, William Francis		

=== 2026 ===
Film	No	Song	Composer(s)	Writer(s)	Co-Singer(s)	Ref.	Note
Madhuvidhu		Mellave Mellave	Hesham Abdul Wahab	B. K. Harinarayanan			

== Tamil film songs ==
Year.	Film	No	Song	Composer(s)	Writer(s)	Co-Singer(s)	Note
2007	Muruga	1	"Chinnanchiru Chitte"	Karthik Raja	Na. Muthukumar	Sangeetha Rajeshwaran	
2008	Pirivom Santhippom	2	"Iru Vizhiyo"	Vidyasagar	Jayantha	Saindhavi	
2010	Aval Peyar Thamizharasi	3	"Vadakka Therkka"	Vijay Antony	Ekadasi		
2010	Angadi Theru	4	"Aval Appadi Ontrum Azhagillai"	Vijay Antony	Na. Muthukumar	Ranjith, Janaki Iyer	
2012	Mattuthavani	5	"Kadhalikka Poravare"	Deva	Mani Muthu		
2015	Maari	6	"Oru Vidha Aasai"	Anirudh Ravichander	Dhanush		
2018	Amutha	7	"Konjam Sirikkirean"	Arun Gopan	G. Ra		
2018	Aan Devathai	8	"Nigara Than Nigara"	Ghibran	Soundararajan K		
2018	Sketch	9	"Dhiname Dhinanme"	Gopi Sundar	Vineeth Sreenivasan	Mukesh, Aalap Raju, Shabareesh Varma	
2021	Yennanga Sir Unga Sattam	10	"80's Kid"	Guna Balasubramanian			
2022	Varalaru Mukkiyam	11	"Vela Kedachiruchu"	Shaan Rahman	Santhosh Rajan		
2023	Hi Nanna	12	"Nee Maaya Nizhal"	Hesham Abdul Wahab	Vivek	Bhadra Rajin	
2023	Joe	13	"Kovai Kulira"	Siddhu Kumar	Rio Raj		
2024	Once More †	14	"Idhayam"	Hesham Abdul Wahab	Vignesh Srikanth		
2026	Kadhal Reset Repeat †	15	"Un Paarvai"	Harris Jayaraj	Madhan Karky	Pragathi Guruprasad, Gayathry Rajiv	
2026	Youth	16	"Poga Poga"	G.V. Prakash Kumar	Eshwar		

== Kannada film songs ==
Year.	Film	No	Song	Composer(s)	Writer(s)	Co-Singer(s)	Note
2009	Auto	1	"Ondu Besarada Dina"	Vijaykrishna			
2013	Nam Duniya Nam Style	2	"Sorry Please Thank You"	Shaan Rahman	Kaviraj	Tippu	
2023	Hi Nanna	3	"Ee Jeevavane"	Hesham Abdul Wahab	Kaviraj	Bhadra Rajin	

== Telugu film songs ==
Year.	Film	No	Song	Composer(s)	Writer(s)	Co-Singer(s)	Note
2015	Meda Meeda Abbayi	1	"Hyderabad Nagaram"	Shaan Rahman			
2023	Hi Nanna	2	"Chedu Nijam"	Hesham Abdul Wahab	Krishna Kanth	Geetha Madhuri	

== Malayalam non-film songs ==
Year	TV Series/Album	No.	Song	Composer(s)	Writer(s)	Co-Singer(s)	Note
2007	Malayalee	1	"Friends Forever"	Jakes Bejoy	Vineeth Sreenivasan	Arjun	
2007	Malayalee	2	"Minnalazhakey""	Jakes Bejoy	Jelu Jayaraj	Jakes Bejoy, Maya	
2007	Monjulla Painkili	3	"Neeyente Khalbil Kayari"	Hamza Kunnathery	Hamza Kunnathery		
2008	Coffee @ Mg Road	4	"Coffee @ MG Road"	Shaan Rahman	Vineeth Sreenivasan		
2008	Coffee @ Mg Road	5	"College"	Shaan Rahman	Vineeth Sreenivasan		
2008	Coffee @ Mg Road	6	"Masha Allah"	Shaan Rahman	Vineeth Sreenivasan		
2008	Coffee @ Mg Road	7	"Palavattam"	Shaan Rahman	Vineeth Sreenivasan		
2008	Coffee @ Mg Road	8	"Let Me Tell You A Story"	Shaan Rahman	Vineeth Sreenivasan		
2008	Coffee @ Mg Road	9	"O Saathi"	Shaan Rahman	Vineeth Sreenivasan		
2008	Coffee @ Mg Road	10	"Peythu Peythu"	Shaan Rahman	Vineeth Sreenivasan		
2008	Coffee @ Mg Road	11	"Poonkuyile"	Shaan Rahman	Vineeth Sreenivasan		
2008	Violet	12	"Ethra Rathrikalil"	Mithun Raaj	Sreekanth J Vazhapulli		
2008	Violet	13	"Azhakee Nee Charathu"	Mithun Raaj	Sreekanth J Vazhapulli		
2008	Minnaminni	14	"Kingini Kattile"				
2008	Ente Nadu Ente Veedu Ente Onam	15	"Thumbila Chorunnan"	E. K Naseem	Manas		
2008	Ente Nadu Ente Veedu Ente Onam	16	"Kuttanaattile Vallakkari"	E. K Naseem	Manas		
2008	Ente Nadu Ente Veedu Ente Onam	17	"Thinkalazhcha Kaalathu"	E. K Naseem	Manas		
2008	Ente Nadu Ente Veedu Ente Onam	18	"Ente Nadu Ente Veedu Ente Onam"	E. K Naseem	Manas		
2009		19	"Mizhiyil"				
2009	Kumkumam	20	"Puthilanji Thazhvarayil"				
2009	Mounam Pranayam	21	"Anuraga Painkiliye"				
2009	Varumo Vasantham	22	"Anthikkili Chengila Ketti"				
2009	Varumo Vasantham	23	"Nilachandanam Pozhiyave"				
2009	Alone	24	"Ekanaay"				
2009	La Cochin	25	"Ninne"	Dijo Jose Antony	Dijo Jose Antony		
2010	Legends from CAN-TEEN	26	"Unaru Keralame"				
2011	Liquidize	27	"Neelathamara"				
2012	Azhake	28	"Parayathe"				
2013	Anbe	30	"Anbe"				
2013	Ninayathe	31	"Ariyathe Ninayathe"	Jaiz John	Jaiz John		
2017	Kande Kande	32	"Kande Kande"	Nijad Babu Thomas	Manu Majith		
2018	Pallathi	33	"Veendum "	Kiran Raj	Pinky Surendran		
2019	Mizhiyil Nirayum Maunam	34	"Mayum Meghame"				
2020	Return	35	"Taka Tai Tha"	Mridul Nair	Vaishak Sugunan		
2021	Manamaake	36	"Manamaake"				
2021	Jaana Mere Jaana	37	"Jaana Mere Jaana"	Peer Mohammed, Jubair Muhammed	P T Abdul Rahman, Abhishek Talented	Amol Shrivastava	
2021	Naaleyanu Mangalam	38	"Naaleyanu Mangalam"	Shaan Rahman	Manu Manjith	Afsal, Pradeep Palluruthi, Arvind Venugopal, Swetha Ashok, Nandha J Devan	
2021	Manassinte Ullil	39	"Manassinte Ullil"	Chand Pasha, Jubair Muhammed	T.K.Kuttiali		
2021	Nilavil	40	"Nilavil"	Roshan Boban	Roshan Boban		
2021	Kathakal Chollidaam Niraye	41	"Kathakal Chollidaam Niraye"	Alphonse Puthren	Vineeth Sreenivasan		
2022	AANN 41	"Ponam akale"	Sibu Sukumaran	Faisal ponnani	Jaison James		
2022	41	"Konjum Nin Imbam"	Reghu Kumar	Pandalam Sudhakaran	Vrinda Menon		
2022	Ramani Ponnammini	42	"Ramani Ponnammini"	Melvin Michael	Akshay Koloor		
2022	Mounamaay	43	"Mounamaay"	Sadar Nedumangad	Sadar Nedumangad	Sivaangi K	
Parumalaye Vishudhamakkiya Thapasanam	44	"Parumalaye Vishudhamakkiya Thapasanam"	Gejo Cheriyil	Shaju K. John			
2023	Sakhi	44	"Sakhi"	Keethan, Shravan Sridhar	Jayathi Arun		
2023	7 Days Of Love	45	"Dhoore Dhoore"	Sadar Nedumangad	Sadar Nedumangad		
2023	TheanMittayi	46	"Oru Nokkinaal"	Sadar Nedumangad	Sadar Nedumangad		
2024	Jeevah	47	"Jeevah"	Sibu Sukumaran	Faisal Ponnani		
2024	Thrissur Pooram	48	"Aanappooram"	Viresh Sreevalsa	Viresh Sreevalsa		
2024	Priyathama	49	"Priyathama"	B Murali Krishna	B K Harinarayanan		
2026	Munthirippoovu	50	"Munthirippoovu"	Jobin Sivadasan	Titto P Thankachen	Jobin Sivadasan	

== Tamil non-film songs ==
Year	TV Series/Album	No.	Song	Composer(s)	Writer(s)	Co-Singer(s)	Note
2021	Adipoli – Tamil Independent Single	1	"Maane Oh Maane"	Siddhukumar	Vignesh Ramakrishna	Sivaangi K	

== Lyricist ==
Year	Film	Song(s)	Ref.
2010	Malarvaadi Arts Club	"Manyamaha Janangale"	
2010	Malarvaadi Arts Club	"Kaathu Kaathu"	
2010	Malarvaadi Arts Club	"Innoree Mazhayil"	
2010	Malarvaadi Arts Club	"Changaayi"	
2010	Malarvaadi Arts Club	"Snehame"	
2010	Malarvaadi Arts Club	"Aayiram Kaatham"	
2010	Malarvaadi Arts Club	"Lavan kashmalan"	
2011	Sabash Sariyana Potti	"Plus Plus"	
2012	Thattathin Marayathu	"Anuraagathin Velayil"	
2012	Thattathin Marayathu	"Anuragam"	
2014	Ormayundo Ee Mukham	"Aaromale"	
2014	Ormayundo Ee Mukham	"Ee Mizhikalin"	
2015	Oru Vadakkan Selfie	"Chennai Pattanam"	
2015	Oru Vadakkan Selfie	"Enne Thallendammaava"	
2015	Oru Vadakkan Selfie	"Kaikkottum Kandittilla"	
2016	Aanandam	"Dooreyo"	
2017	Aana Alaralodalaral	"Neeyum Njanum"	
2017	Aana Alaralodalaral	"Sunnath Kalyanam"	
2018	Sketch	"Dhiname Dhinanme"	
2019	Love Action Drama	"Churulariyaatha"	
2019	Helen	"Thaarapadhamaake"	
2022	Hridayam	"Onakka Munthiri"	
2024	Varshangalkku Shesham	"Madhu Pakaroo"	
2024	Varshangalkku Shesham	"Pyara Mera Veera"	
2024	Varshangalkku Shesham	"Joo-Roo-Ba"	

== As composer ==
Year	TV Series/Album	No.	Song	Singer(s)	Writer(s)	Note
2020	Uyarnnu Parannu	1	"Uyarnnu Parannu"	Divya Vineeth	Vineeth Sreenivasan	
