= Sharjah Indian School =

Secondary school in UAE

Coordinates: 25.3447133745°N 55.4084194118°E

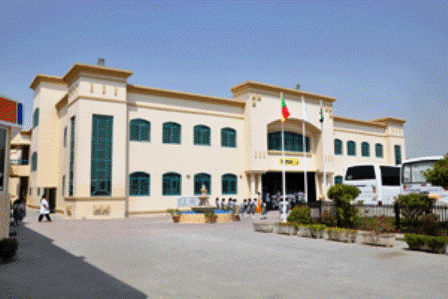
- Sharjah Indian School (Girls Branch)
- Sharjah; United Arab Emirates

Information
- Motto: Educate, Enlighten, Empower
- Established: 1979
- School board: CBSE
- Principal: Pramod Mahajan (Girls Wing), Vijimon Iyyapan (Boys Wing)
- Grades: KG - XII
- Enrollment: 14,000 (Approx.)
- Website: https://www.sissharjah.com/ (Girls Branch), https://www.sisjuwaiza.com/ (Boys Branch)

Sharjah Indian School is a senior secondary school in Sharjah, United Arab Emirates, having approximately 13,937 students and 588 teachers. It is owned and managed by Indian Association Sharjah, located in the United Arab Emirates. It expanded in 2016 to a new building in the Juwaiza area of Sharjah near Sajaa.

== History ==
Sharjah Indian School was established by Vakayil Damodar in 1979 in Sharjah with 280 pupils and 13 teachers. It was officially inaugurated on September 5, 1979, by His Excellency M. H. Ansari, former Ambassador of India in the presence of His Excellency Shaikh Abdul Aziz Bin Mohammed Al Qassimi.

== Governance ==
Sharjah Indian School is private school owned and managed by the Indian Association Sharjah (IAS). The school is approved and licensed by the Sharjah Private Education Authority (SPEA), UAE and is affiliated to Central Board of Secondary Education, New Delhi, India.

== Curriculum ==
The curriculum and programme of work are by the requirements of the Central Board of Secondary Education New Delhi, India.

The medium of instruction in the school is English, with Hindi as the compulsory second language from first grade up to eighth grade. Malayalam is an optional subject from second grade to fifth grade. Students can continue Hindi as a second language in ninth and tenth grade or choose French, CBSE Arabic, or Malayalam. The school provides both science and commerce streams. General Arabic is taught as per the rules laid down by the Ministry of Education. Islamic Studies is compulsory for all Muslim children. The children who leave the school with a transfer certificate are eligible for admission to any school in India.

== In popular culture ==
In the 2016 Malayalam film Jacobinte Swargarajyam starring Nivin Pauly, a few scenes of the film were shot in the girls' branch of Sharjah Indian School. Aima Rosmy Sebastian, who plays Ammu Jacob in the film, completed her primary education in this school.

In 2022, Nivin Pauly visited the boys branch of Sharjah Indian School in promotion for his starrer 2022 Malayalam film, Saturday Night.

== Notable alumni ==
- Aima Rosmy Sebastian, actress and dancer
- Suhasini Rajaram Naidu (Sneha) – Indian actress
