= List of awards and nominations received by Nivin Pauly =

List of awards received by Nivin Pauly
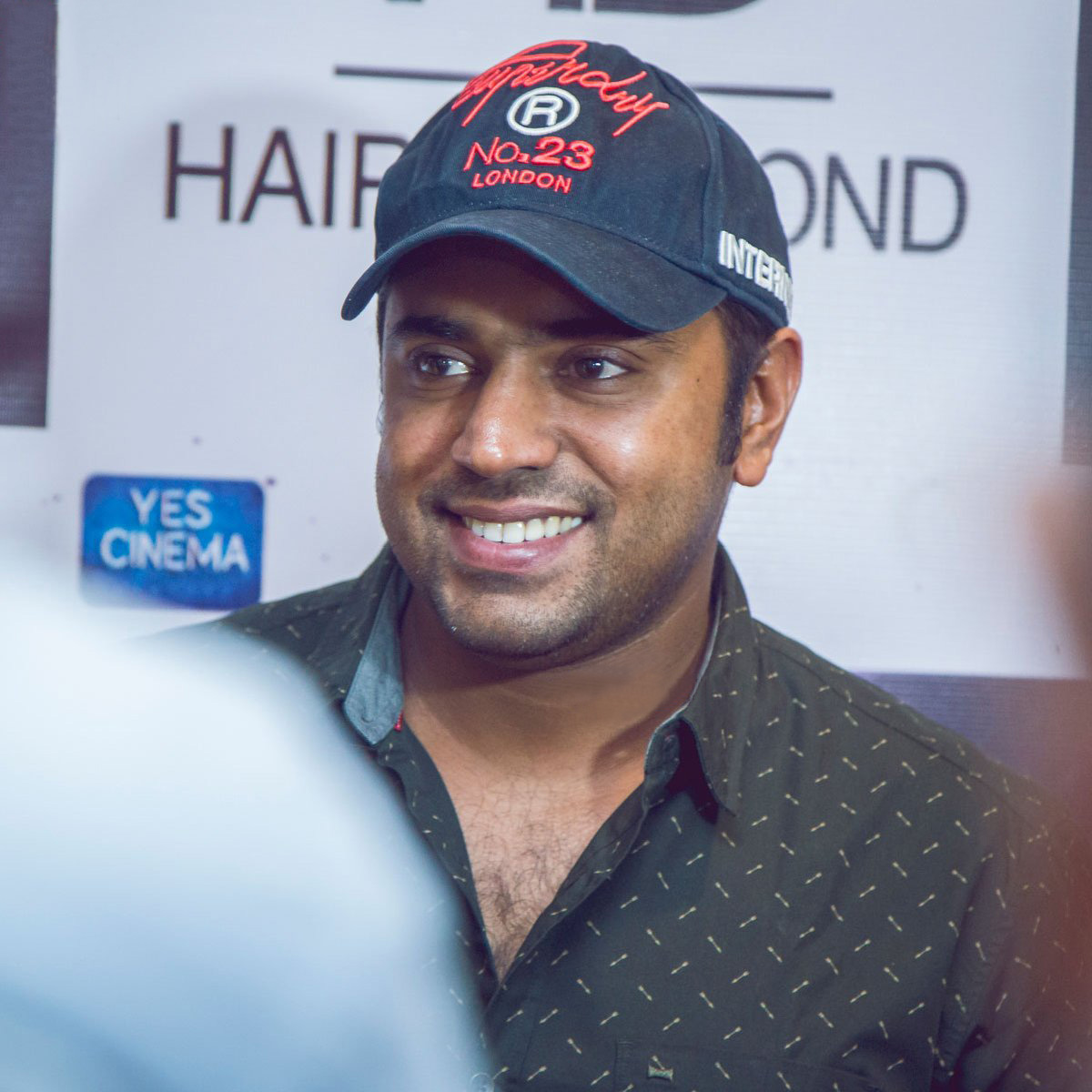
- Pauly at the premiere of Richie in 2017
Awards and nominations
Award	Wins	Nominations
Kerala State Film Awards	2	2
Filmfare Awards South	3	8
Kerala Film Critics Association Awards	2	2
South Indian International Movie Awards	6	11
Asianet Film Awards	8	11
Vanitha Film Awards	5	5
Asiavision Awards	6	6
IIFA Utsavam	0	3
Vanitha Film Awards	5	5
Ananda Vikatan Cinema Awards	1	1
New York Indian Film Festival	1	1
- Totals
Wins	39
Nominations	55

Nivin Pauly (born 11 October 1984) is an Indian actor and producer who works predominantly in Malayalam films. He is the recipient of two Kerala State Film Awards, three Filmfare Awards South, two Kerala Film Critics Association Awards, and seven SIIMA Awards. He made his acting debut in Vineeth Sreenivasan's directorial debut, Malarvaadi Arts Club in 2010. The 2012 film Thattathin Marayathu pushed him into stardom.

== Awards and nominations ==
List of awards and nominations
Award	Year	Category	Film	Result	Ref.
Kerala State Film Awards	2014	Best Actor	1983, Bangalore Days	Won	
Kerala State Film Awards	2019	Special Mention	Moothon	Won	
Filmfare Awards South	2013	Filmfare Award for Best Male Debut – South	Neram	Won	
Filmfare Awards South	2014	Best Actor – Malayalam	1983	Nominated	
Filmfare Awards South	2014	Best Actor Critics – Malayalam	1983	Won	
Filmfare Awards South	2015	Best Actor – Malayalam	Premam	Nominated	
Filmfare Awards South	2016	Best Film – Malayalam	Action Hero Biju	Nominated	
Filmfare Awards South	2016	Best Actor – Malayalam	Action Hero Biju	Won	
Filmfare Awards South	2017	Best Actor – Malayalam	Sakhavu	Nominated	
Filmfare Awards South	2024	Best Actor – Malayalam	Thuramukham	Nominated	
South Indian International Movie Awards	2012	Rising Star of South Indian Cinema (Male)	Thattathin Marayathu	Won	
South Indian International Movie Awards	2013	Best Male Debut – Tamil	Neram	Nominated	
South Indian International Movie Awards	2014	Best Actor – Malayalam	1983	Won	
South Indian International Movie Awards	2015	Best Actor – Malayalam	Premam	Nominated	
South Indian International Movie Awards	2015	Best Actor Critics – Malayalam	Premam	Won	
South Indian International Movie Awards	2016	Best Film – Malayalam	Action Hero Biju	Nominated	
South Indian International Movie Awards	2016	Best Actor – Malayalam	Action Hero Biju, Jacobinte Swargarajyam	Nominated	
South Indian International Movie Awards	2016	Best Actor Critics – Malayalam	Action Hero Biju, Jacobinte Swargarajyam	Won	
South Indian International Movie Awards	2017	Best Actor – Malayalam	Njandukalude Nattil Oridavela	Won	
South Indian International Movie Awards	2019	Best Actor – Malayalam	Moothon	Nominated	
South Indian International Movie Awards	2019	Best Actor Critics – Malayalam	Moothon	Won	
South Indian International Movie Awards	2025	Best Actor – Malayalam	Sarvam Maya	Won	
New York Indian Film Festival	2019	Best Actor	Moothon	Won	
Asianet Film Awards	2010	Best Debutant (Male)	Malarvaadi Arts Club	Won	
Asianet Film Awards	2012	Best Star Pair	Thattathin Marayathu	Won	
Asianet Film Awards	2013	Best Star Pair	Neram	Won	
Asianet Film Awards	2013	Youth Icon	Neram	Won	
Asianet Film Awards	2014	Best Actor	1983	Nominated	
Asianet Film Awards	2015	Best Actor	Premam	Nominated	
Asianet Film Awards	2015	Most Popular Actor	Premam	Won	
Asianet Film Awards	2015	Youth Icon	Various films	Won	
Asianet Film Awards	2016	Best Actor	Action Hero Biju, Jacobinte Swargarajyam	Nominated	
Asianet Film Awards	2016	Most Popular Actor	Action Hero Biju, Jacobinte Swargarajyam	Won	
Asianet Film Awards	2019	Golden Star of The Year	Moothon, Love Action Drama	Won	
Vanitha Film Awards	2012	Best Star Pair	Thattathin Marayathu	Won	
Vanitha Film Awards	2014	Most Popular Actor	1983	Won	
Vanitha Film Awards	2015	Most Popular Actor	Premam	Won	
Vanitha Film Awards	2016	Most Popular Actor	Action Hero Biju, Jacobinte Swargarajyam	Won	
Vanitha Film Awards	2019	Graceful Performance	Love Action Drama , Moothon	Won	
Asiavision Awards	2012	Youth Icon	Thattathin Marayathu	Won	
Asiavision Awards	2013	Youth Icon	Neram	Won	
Asiavision Awards	2014	Performer of the Year	1983	Won	
Asiavision Awards	2014	Youth Icon	Bangalore Days	Won	
Asiavision Awards	2015	Youth Icon	Premam	Won	
Asiavision Awards	2016	Best Actor	Action Hero Biju, Jacobinte Swargarajyam	Won	
IIFA Utsavam	2015	Best Actor	Premam	Nominated	
IIFA Utsavam	2016	Best Film	Action Hero Biju	Nominated	
IIFA Utsavam	2016	Best Actor	Jacobinte Swargarajyam	Nominated	
Kerala Film Critics Association Awards	2016	Special jury	Action Hero Biju	Won	
Kerala Film Critics Association Awards	2019	Best Actor	Moothon	Won	
Ananda Vikatan Cinema Awards	2013	Best Debut	Neram	Won	
