= Kerala Film Critics Association Awards 2016 =

Annual Indian film awards ceremony

The 40th Kerala Film Critics Association Awards, recognising excellence in the Malayalam films released in 2016, were announced in March 2017.

== Winners ==
=== Main awards ===
- Best Film: Oppam
- Best Actor: Mohanlal (Oppam)
- Best Actress: Nayanthara (Puthiya Niyamam)
- Best Director: Priyadarshan (Oppam)
- Second Best Film: Jacobinte Swargarajyam
- Best Popular Film: Pulimurugan
- Second Best Actor (Male): Renji Panicker (Jacobinte Swargarajyam) and Siddique (Sukhamayirikkatte)
- Second Best Actor (Female): Surabhi Lakshmi (Minnaminungu)
- Best Screenplay: Vineeth Sreenivasan(Jacobinte Swargarajyam)
- Best Music Director: M. Jayachandran (Kambhoji)
- Best Male Playback Singer: Madhu Balakrishnan
- Best Female Playback Singer: Varsha Vinu and Alka Ajith
- Best Cinematographer: Sujith Vaassudev (James And Alice)
- Best Lyricist: Vayalar Sarath Chandra Varma (Kochavva Paulo Ayyappa Coelho)
- Best Editing: Abhilash Balachandran (Vetta)
- Best Child Artist: Baby Esther Anil and Baby Akshara
- Best Sound Design: Dan Jose (Aadupuliyattam)
- Best Art Director: M. Bava (Action Hero Biju)
- Best Costume Design: Indrans Jayan (Kambhoji)
- Best Makeup: Saji Koratti (Oppam)

=== Special Jury Awards ===
- Socially Relevant Film: Saji S. Palamel (Aaradi / Six Feet)
- Sanskrit Film: M. Surendran (Suryakantha)
- Technical Excellence: Nissar (2 Days)
- Acting: Lakshmi Gopalaswamy (Kambhoji)
- Acting: Nivin Pauly (Action Hero Biju)
- Acting: Tini Tom (Daffedar)
- Acting: Samuthirakani (Oppam)

=== Honorary Awards ===
- Chalachitra Ratnam Award: Sreekumaran Thampi
- Ruby Jubilee Award: Adoor Gopalakrishnan
- Chalachitra Prathibha Award: Fazil, Ramachandra Babu, Shanthi Krishna
