= G. Prajith =

Indian film director and producer

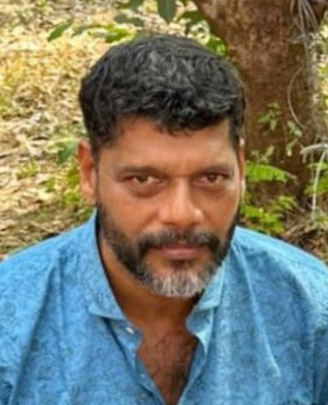
- Born: Prajith Karanavar; Kozhencherry, Kerala, India
- Education: St. Albert's College, Eranakulam
- Occupations: Director; Producer
- Years active: 2003–present

G. Prajith is an Indian film director and producer who predominantly works in Malayalam cinema. After many years working as an assistant director, associate director, and chief associate director, he made his directional debut with the 2015 road-comedy film Oru Vadakkan Selfie. He has also directed its Telugu remake, Meda Meeda Abbayi.

== Filmography ==
=== As director ===
Year	Title	Language	Ref.
2015	Oru Vadakkan Selfie	Malayalam	
2017	Meda Meeda Abbayi	Telugu	
2019	Sathyam Paranja Viswasikkuvo	Malayalam	
2026	Ashakal Aayiram	Malayalam	

=== As producer ===
Year	Title	Ref.
2019	Nalpathiyonnu	
2022	Jo & Jo	
2023	Journey of Love 18+	

=== As chief associate director ===
Year	Title	Director	Ref.
2008	One Way Ticket	Bipin Prabhakar	
2009	Passenger	Ranjith Sankar	
2010	Mummy & Me	Jeethu Joseph	
2010	Malarvaadi Arts Club	Vineeth Sreenivasan	
2011	The Metro	Bipin Prabhakar	
2011	Doctor Love	K. Biju	
2012	Thattathin Marayathu	Vineeth Sreenivasan	
2013	Thira	Vineeth Sreenivasan	
2013	Red Wine	Salam Bappu	
2014	Pedithondan	Pradeep Chokli	

=== As creative director ===
Year	Title	Director	Reference
2016	Jacobinte Swargarajyam	Vineeth Sreenivasan	

=== As associate director ===
Year	Title	Director	Reference
2003	Melvilasam Sariyanu	Pradeep Chokli	
2005	Five Fingers	Sanjeev Raj	
2006	Thanthra	KJ Bose	
2007	Ayur Rekha	GM Manu	
2009	Sanmanasullavan Appukuttan	GM Manu	
2010	Cocktail	Arun Kumar Aravind	
2013	Black Butterfly	M. Renjith	
2013	Kunjananthante Kada	Salim Ahamed	
