= Mahaveeryar =

Film directed by Abrid Shine

- Promotional poster
- Directed by: Abrid Shine
- Screenplay by: Abrid Shine
- Story by: M. Mukundan
- Produced by: Nivin Pauly; P.S Shamnas; Abrid Shine
- Starring: Nivin Pauly; Asif Ali; Shanvi Srivastava; Lal; Siddique
- Cinematography: Chandru Selvaraj
- Edited by: Manoj
- Music by: Ishaan Chhabra
- Production companies: Pauly Jr. Pictures; Indian Movie Makers
- Distributed by: Pauly Jr. Pictures
- Release date: 21 July 2022
- Running time: 129 minutes
- Country: India
- Language: Malayalam

Mahaveeryar is a 2022 Indian Malayalam-language fantasy drama film written and directed by Abrid Shine, based on a short story by M. Mukundan. It was produced by Pauly Jr. Pictures and Indian Movie Makers. The film stars Nivin Pauly, Asif Ali, Shanvi Srivastava, Lal, and Siddique.

Mahaveeryar was released in theatres on 21 July 2022.

== Plot ==
The film begins in the 18th century in the fictional kingdom of Manomaya, where Rudra Mahaveera Ugrasena Maharaja (Lal) suffers from persistent hiccups. Despite consulting several physicians, the king is unable to find a cure. He summons his chief minister Veerabhadran (Asif Ali) and orders him to find a woman possessing exceptional beauty and purity. Veerabhadran travels across the kingdom in search of a suitable woman and eventually encounters Devayani (Shanvi Srivastava), a flower seller living with her father Krishnanunni. He informs her father that Devayani has been chosen to become the king's wife and takes her to the palace.

The narrative shifts to the present day, where a mysterious monk named Swami Apoornnananthan (Nivin Pauly) appears near a Hanuman temple. When the temple priest discovers that the deity's idol is missing, the villagers find it near the monk and he is arrested on suspicion of theft. He is subsequently brought before a court presided over by Chief Judicial Magistrate M. M. Veerendra Kumar (Siddique). Apoornnananthan chooses to defend himself without a lawyer and challenges the witnesses through unconventional arguments. During the proceedings, his knowledge of history, philosophy and law becomes apparent. His supernatural abilities and unusual conduct also attract the attention of those present in the courtroom.

As the proceedings continue, Apoornnananthan introduces a separate case involving the kingdom of Manomaya and its ruler. Through his intervention, characters from the 18th century, including the king and Veerabhadran, appear in the contemporary courtroom. Krishnanunni files a complaint against the king and his minister, alleging that his daughter Devayani was forcibly taken from their home. Devayani also appears as a witness and describes how Veerabhadran took her to the palace after giving her the impression that he had fallen in love with her. She later discovers that he intends to present her to the king and feels betrayed when he hands her over in exchange for royal gifts.

During the trial, Devayani recounts how the king attempted to make her cry and subjected her to physical and mental suffering. The king's representatives argue that Veerabhadran was merely carrying out a royal order and that the allegations against the king are unfounded. The proceedings also expose the conflicting interpretations of personal liberty, royal authority and the rights of ordinary subjects. Veerabhadran defends his actions by referring to the duties of a minister under the kingdom's laws, while the king insists that his subjects are obligated to obey his commands.

The king eventually reveals the reason behind his demand for Devayani. According to him, a royal priest appeared in a dream and told him that drinking a cup of tears from a woman of exceptional purity would cure his persistent hiccups. Since Devayani refused to cry, the king considered her disobedience an offence against his authority. The court subsequently dismisses the complaints against the king and his minister, ruling that the allegations have not been sufficiently established. It also orders that Devayani's tears be collected for the king's treatment.

When attempts to make Devayani cry fail, the court orders that she be whipped. Apoornnananthan intervenes and offers to resolve the situation. He reveals that Veerabhadran had concealed his own wife in his attic, while presenting the gardener's wife to the king as Devayani. Apoornnananthan then provides a solution that allows the king to obtain the tears he desires, bringing the proceedings involving the kingdom to an end.

Following the conclusion of the case, Apoornnananthan prepares to leave. When questioned about the missing temple idol, he maintains that he is merely a witness to idols being created and stolen, rather than a thief. He then transforms into a butterfly and departs, leaving the people around him bewildered.

== Cast ==
- Nivin Pauly as Swami Apoornnanandan
- Asif Ali as Veerabhadran
- Shanvi Srivastava as Devayani
- Lal as Rudhra Mahaveera Ugrasena Maharaja Thirumannasu
- Siddique as MM Veerendra Kumar -Chief Judicial Magistrate
- Lalu Alex as Public Prosecutor
- Major Ravi as Veerabhaskar
- Aadukalam Naren as Pandian
- Mallika Sukumaran as Kaladevi
- Vijay Menon as Veerasimhan
- Sampath Raj as Sivaraj
- Krishna Prasad as Krishnanunni
- Prajod Kalabhavan as Veerachandran T. N.
- Sudheer Paravoor as Babukuttan
- Natasha Singh as Veerabhadran's wife

== Production ==
Mahaveeryar is the third-time collaboration between Nivin and Abrid Shine, after 1983 and Action Hero Biju. The film was produced by Nivin's own production house, Pauly Jr. Pictures. After starring together in Rajesh Pillai's Traffic and Joshiy's Sevenes, Asif and Nivin reunite a decade later in the film. The cinematography was handled by Chandru Selvaraj, and the music was composed by Ishaan Chhabra. Kannada actor Shanvi Srivastava plays the female lead.

The principal photography of the film started on 21 February 2021 with a switch-on ceremony in Rajasthan. The major portion was shot in Jaipur. On 20 April 2021, principal photography of the film was completed.

== Music ==
The soundtrack of Maha Veeryar is composed by Ishaan Chhabra and lyrics by B. K. Harinarayanan and Assanu Anna Augustine.

No.	Title	Lyrics	Singer(s)	Length
1.	"Radhe Radhe"	B.K. Harinarayanan	Vidyadharan Master and Jeevan Padmakumar	3:05
2.	"Varanavilley"	Assanu Anna Augustine	Anwesha	3:41
3.	"Thakaramale Samayamale Unaru"	B.K. Harinarayanan	K. S Harishankar and Anand Sreeraj	4:17
4.	"Anuraga Manam"	B.K. Harinarayan	Anwesshaa and Karthik	3:21
5.	"Madhukara"	B.K. Harinarayan	K.S. Harisankar	3:45

== Release ==
The film was released in theaters on 21 July 2022. Subsequently, it was released digitally through Sun NXT on 10 February 2023.

=== Reception ===
The Times of India rated the film 3.5 out of 5 stars and wrote "It is the best of times.. If you are in the mood for fun mixed with seriousness, this movie is for you".

The perceived drawback of the film was that it does not have any transitory segments/voice-over or creative cues surrounding time travel, legal proceedings, and social justice. However, few critics heaped praises on the film.

The climax was later changed and was better received and understood by the audience.

== Awards ==
Kerala Film Critics Association Awards (2022)

- Best Story – M. Mukundan
