= Addicted to Life =

Anti-drug marketing campaign

Addicted to Life (Campaign)
- Key people: Mammootty (Promoter)
- Website: http://www.addictedtolife.in

Addicted to Life is an anti drug campaign aiming to create awareness on drugs, including alcohol. It was launched in Kerala, India by the Chief Minister Oommen Chandy on 6 August 2014 with the backing of the excise department and the Kerala state Beverages Corporation. The campaign garnered considerable popularity from its very inception, although its overall impact on substance use is unclear as the number of drug-related cases registered in Kerala increased from 508 in 2008 to 9,242 in 2017.

== Campaign ==
Chandy launched the campaign by liking its Facebook page on 6 August 2014. According to Gulf Times, the page's likes grew to 100,000 within a week and passed 145,000 by 16 August, and about 60,000 users had replaced their Facebook cover photo with the campaign poster. Actors including Dulquer Salmaan, Jayasurya, Fahadh Faasil and Nivin Pauly publicly supported it.

Abdul Manaf was reported as the initiator of the social media effort, which was described as a year-long campaign with short film and photography contests planned. State minister for liquor trade K. Babu said it was taken to social media because young people were increasingly vulnerable to drugs.
