= The Metro (film) =

- Directed by: Bipin Prabhakar
- Written by: Vyasan Edavanakkadu
- Produced by: Dileep
- Starring: R. Sarathkumar; Nivin Pauly; Suraj Venjaramoodu; Bhagath Manuel; Biyon; Arun Kumar; Bhavana; Suresh Krishna
- Cinematography: Sreeram
- Edited by: Mahesh Narayanan
- Music by: Shaan Rahman
- Production company: Graand Production
- Distributed by: Kalasangham Films
- Release date: 21 January 2011
- Country: India
- Language: Malayalam
- Box office: ₹1.55 crore (US$160,000)

The Metro is a 2011 Malayalam action thriller crime film directed by Bipin Prabhakar, starring R. Sarathkumar, Nivin Pauly, Bhavana, Suraj Venjaramoodu, Bhagath Manuel, Biyon Gemini, Arun Kumar, Suresh Krishna, and Dileep in cameo appearance. It is a hyperlink film based on three separate incidents that take place in Kochi. The film was produced by Dileep under his Grand Productions banner.

== Plot ==
The film follows three stories. The first one involves the murder of a young politician, Jaimy Padamadan, which CI Jacob Alexander is investigating. The murder occurs during an election campaign, and the main suspect is a dreaded don and crime boss named Paruthikkadan Shaji. The investigation is affected due to his political influence.

The second story is about Anupama, an I.T. company employee who is being followed by a group of gangsters. The story takes new turns, and the mystery gets solved. The third story is about a group of five friends: Harikrishnan, Sujathan, Usman, Sooraj and Gopan. Harikrishnan is a youth working in Saudi Arabia and Sujathan is jeep driver who is married and having two kids. He and his friends are traveling to Pala to deliver a package from the Gulf to another person and planning a hangout. The story takes a new turn during their journey.

They land in trouble when Usman beats Shaji's brother, Freddy, for hitting their jeep and when Gopan records Shaji killing his rival, Thattil John, as he filmed Jaimy's murder. Shaji and henchmen went to hunt them. During the hunt, Freddy kills Sujathan with a knife and in revenge, Hari kills Freddy. They call Anupama whom they once saved from a robbery by Shaji's men for help. She goes to Jacob, who was revealed to be her elder brother and plans to save them from Shaji. Shaji's men find them again but during the chase, Sooraj is caught. Jacob arrives and manages to save them. Shaji uses Sooraj to lure his friends. He calls Hari and threatens them to come to the same place where Hari killed Freddy with the phone, otherwise he will kill Sooraj. They arrive but they don't find the phone when Shaji's men check their bodies. It is revealed that they gave the phone to Jacob to check the murder video and to call the fire force and ambulance to wake up the villagers. Jacob fights Shaji's henchmen and beats Shaji. When the villagers arrive, Jacob kills Shaji with his service revolver as the villagers tell him that goons like Shaji are no longer needed because he bribes the police and ministers.

== Cast ==
- R. Sarathkumar in a dual role as:
  - CI Jacob Alexander (Son) (voiceover by Shobi Thilakan)
  - Head Constable Alexander (Father)
- Nivin Pauly as Harikrishnan
- Suraj Venjaramoodu as Sujathan
- Bhagath Manuel as Usman Kareem
- Biyon as Gopan
- Arun Kumar as Sooraj
- Bhavana as Anupama Alexander (voiceover by Sreeja Ravi)
- Suresh Krishna as Paruthikkadan Shaji,the main antagonist
- G. K. Pillai as MP Kumbalam Varkey
- Nishanth Sagar as Paruthikkadan Freddy, secondary antagonist
- Kalashala Babu as Louis
- Jagathy Sreekumar as Achayan
- Ponnamma Babu as Achayan's wife
- Shammi Thilakan as City Police Commissioner Satheesh Kumar IPS
- Sadiq as SI Vishwanathan (Vishwam)
- Kalabhavan Shajon as Kattappuram Chandran
- Rajeev Parameshwar as Jaimy Padamadan
- K. P. A. C. Saji as Vedimara Thankachan
- Manikandan Pattambi as George Thaikkudam
- Manju Satheesh as Sumathi, Sujathan's wife
- Esther Anil as Sujathan's daughter
- Deepika Mohan as Harikrishnan's mother
- Dileep as Himself, (Narrator) cameo appearance

== Production ==
The Metro is the fourth directorial venture of Bipin Prabhakar who previously directed Samasthakeralam PO, One Way Ticket and Khaki. The film's cast includes several new faces along with R. Sarathkumar who did his first lead role in a Malayalam film. Nivin Pauly and Bhagath Manuel, who debuted through Malarvaadi Arts Club once again collaborate in this film. Sreeram handles the camera while Mahesh Narayanan is the editor. The film's major parts were filmed in Kochi.

== Soundtrack ==
"The Metro" - Shaan Rahman

"Ee Chakada" Vandi - Pradeep Palluruthy

"Maan Mizhi" - Harib Hanif

== Release ==
The film was later dubbed and released in Tamil as Thennindian in December 2015.
