= Abrid Shine =

Indian photographer, film director and screenwriter

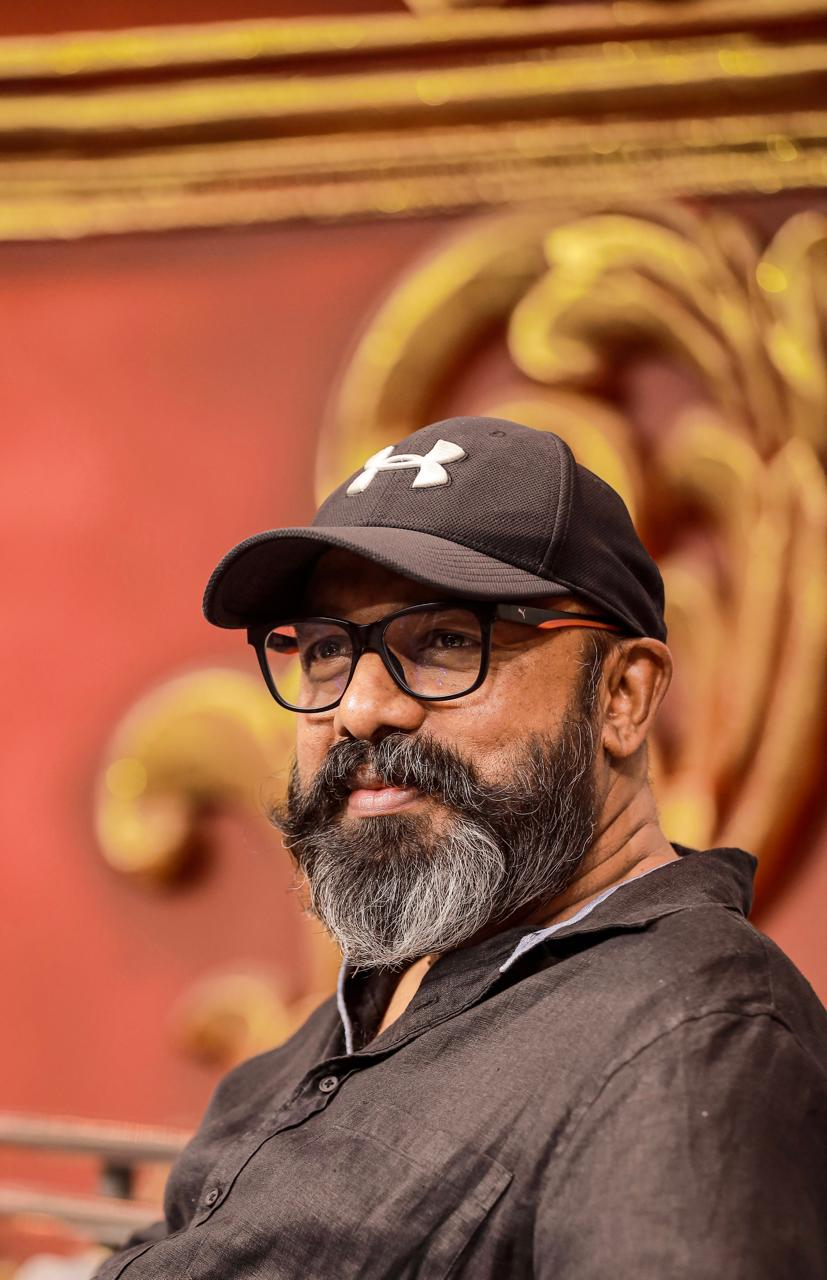
- Born: Velloor, Kottayam, Kerala, India
- Education: Devaswom Board College, Thalayolaparambu
- Occupations: Director; screenwriter; photographer
- Years active: 2013–present
- Spouse: Ambily
- Children: 2

Abrid Shine is an Indian film director, screenwriter and fashion photographer in the Malayalam film industry. He made his directorial debut in 2014 with the film 1983, which won him the prestigious Kerala State Film Award for Best Debut Director.

== Personal life ==
Abrid Shine has two children. His son, Bhagath Abrid played the character as the son of Nivin Pauly in the film 1983 and as the son of Soubin Shahir in the Meow now set to make as leading role for Prema Pranth.

== Career ==
Abrid Shine started his career working as a fashion photographer for the popular Malayalam women's magazine Vanitha. He assisted Lal Jose in Puramkazhchakal in the 2009 ensemble film Kerala Cafe. He debuted as a director with the Malayalam film 1983 in the year 2014.

== Filmography ==
Year	Title	Direction	Writer	Ref.
2014	1983	Yes	Yes	
2016	Action Hero Biju	Yes	Yes	
2018	Poomaram	Yes	Yes	
2020	The Kung Fu Master	Yes	Yes	
2022	Mahaveeryar	Yes	Yes	
2026	Spa	Yes	Yes	

== Awards and nominations ==
Year	Award	Category	Film	Result	Ref.
2014	Asiavision Awards	Best Debut Director	1983	Won	
2015	62nd Filmfare Awards South	Best Director – Malayalam	1983	Nominated	
2015	4th South Indian International Movie Awards	Best Debut Director – Malayalam	1983	Won	
2015	45th Kerala State Film Awards	Best Debut Director	1983	Won	
2017	Asianet Film Awards	Best Director	Action Hero Biju	Won	
2017	2nd IIFA Utsavam	Best Director	Action Hero Biju	Nominated	
2017	64th Filmfare Awards South	Best Director – Malayalam	Action Hero Biju	Nominated	
2017	6th South Indian International Movie Awards	Best Director – Malayalam	Action Hero Biju	Nominated	
