= Padavettu =

2022 Indian film

- Theatrical release poster
- Directed by: Liju Krishna
- Written by: Liju Krishna
- Produced by: Vikram Mehra; Siddharth Anand Kumar; Sunny Wayne
- Starring: Nivin Pauly; Aditi Balan; Shammi Thilakan
- Cinematography: Deepak D. Menon
- Edited by: Shafique Mohamed Ali
- Music by: Govind Vasantha
- Production companies: Yoodlee Films; Sunny Wayne Productions
- Distributed by: Century Release
- Release date: 21 October 2022
- Running time: 145 minutes
- Country: India
- Language: Malayalam

Padavettu (transl. Battle) is a 2022 Indian Malayalam-language political action thriller film written and directed by Liju Krishna. It was produced by Yoodlee Films in association with Sunny Wayne Productions. The film starring Nivin Pauly, Aditi Balan and Shammi Thilakan depicts the story of the oppressed section of society in northern Kerala.

The film was released theatrically on 21 October 2022.

== Plot ==
Ravi is a jobless guy living with his aunt Pushpa. He just sits at home all day and fights with everyone including his aunt and neighbors. His house is in a bad shape now since they do not have money to repair it. They have given an application in the Panchayat for money to repair it. Despite Pushpa always complaining in the Panchayat meetings, they don't seem interested to consider her request.

A local politician named Kuyyali hears this and sees it as an opportunity. He rebuilds their house for them without their permission and keeps a plaque in front of their home advertising his party. Everyone who passes by in front of their home starts noticing it and that irks Ravi and so he breaks it at night. When Kuyyali hears about it, he tries to take advantage of the situation and accuses the opposition party of the wrongdoing. Ravi tells the police that it was he who did that. Kuyyali rebuilds the plaque and threatens Ravi that if he breaks it again, it will be bad for Ravi.

Ravi's neighbor Mohanan's dad gets killed by a wild boar one night when he was supervising his field. To take revenge, Mohanan goes to the field the next night to kill the boar but boar attacks him and he gets injured. Ravi turns up at the scene and kills the Boar instead.

Ravi decides not be lazy in life anymore and starts farming at his home. Meanwhile, Kuyyali through his shoddy schemes tries to take control of all farmer lands. Ravi objects. In revenge, Kuyyali decides that the end location for his election rally will be Ravi's home and they will destroy the home and farm land. Ravi starts destroying the plaque they kept at his home. The party workers starts to fight with Ravi. Ravi wins and then tells Kuyyali never to step on his home again. Ravi proclaims that the farm land belongs to the farmers.

== Cast ==
- Nivin Pauly as Ravi Koroth, an ex-athlete
- Aditi Balan as Shyma, Ravi's love interest (voice over by Nikhila Vimal)
- Shammi Thilakan as Kuyyali, a political leader
- Shine Tom Chacko as Mohanan
- Remya Suresh as Pushpa, Ravi's aunt
- Manoj Omen as Manoj
- Vijayaraghavan as Coach Yohannan
- Indrans as Raghavan Mash
- Sudheesh as Govindhan
- Kainakary Thankaraj as President Vijayan
- Subeesh Sudhi as Sasi
- Sunny Wayne as Pradeep, Shyma's ex-husband (Cameo)

== Production ==
The film was shot at Maloor in Kannur, which is the native village of Liju Krishna. Around a thousand people from the village were trained through crash course in acting for the film.

Principal photography began in December 2019 in Kannur district. First schedule was wrapped in February 2020. Second schedule was delayed due to the COVID-19 pandemic in India. It was wrapped up on 15 March 2022 in Kannur.

== Release ==
The first trailer was released on 7 October 2022 at Jawaharlal Nehru Stadium, Kochi in front of Manjappada before the opening game of the 2022–23 Indian Super League season between Kerala Blasters and East Bengal. The film was released theatrically on 21 October 2022.

== Critical reception ==
Anna M. M. Vetticad of Firstpost praised the cinematography and score but found that the film lacked cohesion: "Great camerawork and music require scripts on which to pin themselves. Sadly, the writing of Padavettu is too defused to serve this purpose." Rating the film 2.5 out of 5 stars, Vetticad wrote, "The first half is solid, but leads into a second half clouded by mixed metaphors and hazy philosophising...".
