= Harikrishnan (Malayalam actor) =

Indian film actor and a classical dancer

Harikrishnan S.
- Born: Vaikom, Kerala, India
- Education: Mahatma Gandhi University, Kerala
- Occupation: Actor
- Years active: 2010–present
- Spouse: Divya (m. 2016)
- Parent(s): Sreekumar MG and Jayasree V T

Harikrishnan S. is an Indian actor and a classical dancer who works in Malayalam cinema. He debuted in the 2010 film Malarvaadi Arts Club directed by Vineeth Sreenivasan. His notable roles include Chattakkari, Ohm Shanthi Oshaana, Aadu and Anjaam Pathiraa.

== Personal life ==
Harikrishnan was born in Vaikom, Kerala, India. He completed his schooling at SMSN H.S.S, and graduated with a Bachelor of Arts in English from Maharaja's College, Ernakulam. He married Divya on 22 May 2016.

== Filmography ==
Year	Title	Role	Ref.
2010	Malarvaadi Arts Club	Praveen	
2012	Chattakkari	Richard	
2014	Ohm Shanthi Oshaana	Yardley	
2014	Monayi Angane Aanayi	Aadhi	
2014	Kuruthamkettavan	Johny	
2015	Aadu	Lolan	
2015	Oru Vadakkan Selfie	Surya Narayan	
2015	Kohinoor	Charlie	
2015	Pickles	Abi	
2015	ATM	Charlie	
2017	Georgettan's Pooram	Rameshan	
2017	Aadu 2	Lolan	
2019	Love Action Drama	Himself	Cameo appearance
2020	Anjaam Pathiraa	Inspector Arun	
2021	The Last Two Days	Bell Man	
2021	Sara'S	Arjun	
2022	Jana Gana Mana	Mathew	
2022	Aanandam Paramanandam	Harikrishnan	
2022	Thattassery Koottam	Arun	
2023	Pallimani	Anandhan	
2023	2018	Alex	
2023	Kaathal – The Core	Dino	
2023	Neru	Jayachandran	
2024	Abraham Ozler	Naveen	
2024	Varshangalkku Shesham	Cameraman	
2024	Abhirami		
2026	Aadu 3	Lolan	

== Television ==
Year	Title	Role	Channel	Ref.
2007	Screen Test	Contestant	Asianet	
2018	Ilayaval Gayathri	Nandan	Mazhavil Manorama	
2019	Dance Kerala Dance	Mentor	Zee Keralam	
