= Aima Rosmy Sebastian =

Indian actress and dancer

- Born: 15 August 1994; Kollam, Kerala, India
- Other name: Chinnu
- Occupations: Actress; Classical dancer
- Years active: 2015–2018; 2023–present
- Notable work: Jacobinte Swargarajyam; Munthirivallikal Thalirkkumbol
- Spouse: Kevin Paul (m. 2018)
- Parents: Sebastian Thomas; Preetha

Aima Rosmy Sebastian is an Indian actress and dancer. She got recognition through her role in Jacobinte Swargarajyam, and prior to that film had been involved in classical Indian dance. Aima lives in Dubai. She married Kevin Paul on 4 January 2018 at Kadavoor in Kollam.

== Acting career ==
She made her acting debut with the Malayalam film Dooram which was shot in 2013 but had a late release on 19 July 2016. Her first movie released was Jacobinte Swargarajyam on 8 April 2016. Aima started her career in acting along with her twin sister Aina in the film Dooram directed by Manu Kannanthanam. Aima, proficient in both Western and classical dance, happened to dance with dancer-actress Mythili Roy, who suggested her name to the makers of Jacobinte Swargarajyam directed by Vineeth Sreenivasan. They were looking for a girl who looked sixteen and was based in Dubai. She was selected after attending an audition. She played the role of Ammu, the sister of Nivin Pauly in the movie. In the year 2017, Aima played the character named Jini, who was Mohanlal's daughter in the movie Munthirivallikal Thalirkkumbol.

== Personal life ==
Aima is originally from Kottayam district, Kerala. Aima married Kevin Paul, Son of Sophia Paul, producer of Weekend Blockbusters on January 4, 2018, at St. Casmir's Church at Kadavoor in Kollam. Aima and Kevin met each other on the sets of Munthirivallikal Thalirkkumbol.

== Filmography ==
Year	Title	Role	Notes
2016	Dooram	Ann Maria	
2016	Jacobinte Swargarajyam	Ammu Jacob	
2016	Halwa		
2017	Munthirivallikal Thalirkkumbol	Jini Ulahannan	
2018	Padayottam	Sahiba	
2023	RDX: Robert Dony Xavier	Simi	
2024	Little Hearts		
