= Bhoopadathil Illatha Oridam =

- Directed by: Joe Chalissery
- Screenplay by: Joe Chalissery
- Based on: "Deshathinte Vijayam" by Sethu
- Produced by: David Kachappilly
- Starring: Sreenivasan; Nivin Pauly; Iniya; Rajsri
- Cinematography: Sameer Haq
- Edited by: Sajit Unnikrishnan
- Music by: Mohan Sitara
- Production company: David Kachappilly Productions
- Distributed by: Sujatha Films
- Release date: 14 September 2012
- Country: India
- Language: Malayalam

Bhoopadathil Illatha Oridam (transl. A place not in the map) is a 2012 Malayalam-language film written and directed by Joe Chalissery (in his directorial debut) based on the short story "Deshathinte Vijayam" by Sethu. A political satire by genre, the film stars Sreenivasan, Nivin Pauly, Iniya, and Rajsri. It was released on 14 September 2012, and the critical reaction to the film was mostly negative.

== Plot ==
Madhavankutty is a schoolmaster in a remote village. He is respected by his students and friends. However, his wife keeps complaining that he does not help her in the house. The village lacks identity as the title suggests.

When a theft happens in a moneylender's shop, everyone around is baffled. It results in sleepless nights for the panchayat president and the police officer in charge of the area. As they have no inkling about who the culprit is, they devise a plan to catch someone with a previous record.

Madhavankutty is the sole eyewitness, as the shop is visible from where he lives. Much of the story is devoted to showing how Madhavankutty dodges the pressure tactics of the police and counters their arguments. But after this incident, people start moving away from him and the film is about how the incident changes his life.

== Cast ==
- Sreenivasan as Madhavankutty
- Nivin Pauly as Murali
- Iniya as Bhama
- Rajashree as Vimala
- Nedumudi Venu as the Panchayat president Ezhuthachan
- Innocent as SI Idikkula Varghese
- Suraj Venjarammoodu as Sugunan
- Albert Fernandez
- Sasi Kalinga as Kumaran
- Salim Kumar as Anto
- Sunil Sukhada
- Aju Varghese as Madhu
- Kochu Preman as Aravindhan
- Zeenath as Karthiayini / tea shop owner
- Lakshmi Priya
