= Meda Meeda Abbayi =

- Theatrical release poster
- Directed by: G. Prajith
- Story by: Vineeth Srinivasan
- Dialogue by: Hyper Aadi
- Based on: Oru Vadakkan Selfie
- Produced by: Boppana Chandrasekhar
- Starring: Allari Naresh; Nikhila Vimal; Hyper Aadi; Srinivas Avasarala
- Cinematography: Kunjuni S. Kumar
- Edited by: Nandamuri Hari
- Music by: Shaan Rahman
- Release date: 8 September 2017
- Running time: 130 minutes
- Country: India
- Language: Telugu

Meda Meeda Abbayi is a 2017 Telugu-language comedy thriller film directed by G. Prajith. This film stars Allari Naresh, and Nikhila Vimal (in her Telugu debut) in the lead roles. This is a remake of 2015 Malayalam film Oru Vadakkan Selfie directed by the same director.

== Plot ==
Srinu is a lazy engineering student who is struggling to pass all his exams. His father runs a grocery shop. Srinu is aimless and likes to hang out with his friends Bandla Babji, Karthu, and others. His parents ask him to look after the grocery store, but he wants to become a filmmaker. Meanwhile, a girl named Sindhu comes into his life as a neighbor. Unable to take pressure from family, he decides to make a short film and upload it to the internet, hoping to get a lot of hits and become viral. However, they lose the camera when Babji accidentally leaves it in a stream after a booze party.

He decides to go to Hyderabad to try his luck in films without informing anyone. On his way to Hyderabad, he runs into Sindhu again and tries to take a selfie with her and sends it to his friend Babji. He reaches Hyderabad and roams around the city for opportunities in films. He soon realizes that it is going to be a tough job and decides to return to his village. As soon as he arrives in the village, he is surrounded by his father and a group of villagers, who accuses him of eloping with Sindhu. Her father threatens him to tell the whereabouts of his daughter. Otherwise, he would complain to the police. He pleads for his innocence, but nobody listens. He calls up his friend Babji to know the actual reason for all the chaos. Babji reveals that he spread the news in the village that they both eloped when encountered with an unavoidable situation. They both escape to Hyderabad again to find Sindhu and bring her back to the village to prove their innocence.

Srinu remembers Sindhu telling him that she was going for an interview at a company called Max Infotech. But they couldn't find her. Meanwhile, a police warrant is issued against them by the villagers for kidnapping Sindhu. They run into a private detective, Yugandhar, on one of their searching spree who offers his help finding her. Yugandhar finds her and brings her to his office. She reveals that she fled from home to escape a forcible marriage proposal arranged by her parents. She came to meet Hari Narayana, whom she met online. They never meet face to face. She claims that she is regularly chatting with Hari. Yugandhar finds out that Hari has actually committed suicide one year ago. However, she does not believe them. She wants to find out the truth on her own. With the help of some of Hari's friends and acquaintances, they find out his native place. They travel to his native place and witnesses his one-year death anniversary proceedings.

Sindhu is shocked to know the truth and is heartbroken. Srinu consoles her, and they travel back to Hyderabad. On the way, Srinu gets puzzled about Yugandhar on how he is able to get clues very quickly and question him. Yugandhar reveals himself to be a CBCID officer Naresh, who is investigating a mass online cheating case by a person called Pandian Uday Bhaskar, in which Sindhu is one of the victims. He was once a business partner of Hari and cheated him, which caused him to commit suicide. Also, he was the one who was using Hari's account to chat with Sindhu. Finally, Naresh traps Uday by posing as a girl and catches him. Srinu then lets Naresh vent out his anger on Uday for cheating innocent girls as what he did to Sindhu. Srinu is then shown walking to a nearby table and asking whether the man sitting there is Uday.

The movie ends with the man answering yes and Srinu hitting him over the head with a bottle and says to Naresh that whenever he needs him to break bottles just call him and went back to his home town with Sindhu. The film ends with a final note that we hope the pair will fall in love soon.

== Cast ==
- Allari Naresh as Srinu, an engineering student
- Nikhila Vimal as Sindhu
- Srinivas Avasarala as Detective Yugander / CBCID officer Naresh
- Hyper Aadi as Bandla Babji
- Satyam Rajesh as Karthu
- Siva Reddy as tuition teacher
- Jeeva as village president
- Jayaprakash as Srinu's father
- Tulasi as Srinu's mother
- Sudha as Hari Narayana's mother
- Ravi Prakash as Hari Narayana's elder brother
- Samrat Reddy as Hari Narayana (in picture)
- Ravi Babu as Panyam Uday Bhaskar (Special appearance)

== Music ==
The music for this film is composed by Shaan Rahman. This album has 5 tracks and all the songs from the original has been retained.

- "Notlona Velu Pedithe"
- "Ekanthama Ekanthame"
- "Hyderabad Nagaram"
- "Ontari Manasa"
- "Kalam Agipodu"

== Release ==
Despite receiving positive reviews it failed at box-office. Two months after its theatrical release, the film had a television premiere on Gemini TV on 25 November 2017.

== Reception ==
Neeshita Nyayapati of The Times of India rated the film three out of five stars and wrote, "Meda Mida Abbayi is worth a watch for those bored of run-of-the-mills tales that Tollywood seems to churn out usually. Give it a chance just for its freshness, if nothing else." Kumar Siva of India Herald wrote, "Nikhila had acted neatly and her performance is good. Allari Naresh's comedy sense and body language is admirable. The comedy track is organized neatly and few scenes are bit lengthy and second part is moving very slowly." Y. Sunita Chowdhary of The Hindu wrote, "It is a slowly narrated film that manages to keep the audience in good humour, it could have been a more striking story with better energy levels from Naresh. However, it is a good choice and attempt."
