= Saturday Night (2022 film) =

2022 Indian film

- First look poster
- Directed by: Roshan Andrews
- Written by: Naveen Bhaskar
- Produced by: Vinayaka Ajith
- Starring: Nivin Pauly; Siju Wilson; Aju Varghese; Saiju Kurup
- Cinematography: Aslam K. Purayil
- Edited by: T. Shivanandeeswaran
- Music by: Jakes Bejoy
- Production company: Ajith Vinayaka Films
- Distributed by: Ajith Vinayaka Release
- Release date: 4 November 2022
- Country: India
- Language: Malayalam

Saturday Night is a 2022 Indian Malayalam-language comedy-drama film directed by Rosshan Andrrews and written by Naveen Bhaskar. It stars Nivin Pauly, Aju Varghese, Siju Wilson, and Saiju Kurup. The music was composed by Jakes Bejoy. The plot explores the relationship between four friends.

This movie was released on 4 November 2022 and received mixed to negative response from audience and gradually it became box office disaster.

== Plot ==
The plot centers around Stanley, portrayed by Nivin Pauly, who has changed significantly since the last time his friends saw him. The film begins with the reunion of these four friends, who come together after a period of separation, only to find Stanley acting mysterious and different from his usual self.

As the narrative unfolds, the friends embark on a journey to unravel the mystery behind Stanley's new persona. This journey becomes a quest not only to understand Stanley but also to rediscover the true meaning of their friendship. The exploration of Stanley's changes leads them through various comedic and dramatic situations, highlighting the evolutions in their personal lives and the bonds they share.

The film delves into themes of change, identity, and the complexities of maintaining friendships over time. It portrays how life events, like marriage in the case of one of the friends, alter the dynamics of their group. The friends face challenges, misunderstandings, and revelations that test their relationships, ultimately leading to a deeper understanding of each other and themselves.

== Cast ==
- Nivin Pauly as Stanley, An Ex-Pilot
- Siju Wilson as Ajith Thomas
- Aju Varghese as Poocha Sunil
- Saiju Kurup as Justin
- Prathap Pothen as Davis Kalathiparambil
- Shari as Nirmala Davis
- Malavika Sreenath as Nikki Emmanuel
- Grace Antony as Susan Maria Paul
- Saniya Iyappan as Vaishnavi
- Vijay Menon as Paul John
- Bipin Perumbilli as Manjunath
- Shaani Shacky as Charles
- Ashvin Mathew as Willy
- Niva James as Rachel
- Ashwini as Sherin Joseph
- Roman Khan

== Production ==
=== Development ===
The film is produced by Vinayaka Ajith under the banner of Ajith Vinayaka films. Naveen Bhaskar completed its script work. Saturday Night with Kirukkanum Koottukaarum is the film's full title. Nivin Pauly portrays Stanley. As per Nivin Pauly's social media post the film is a comedy entertainer.

=== Casting ===
Roshan Andrews who is the director of the film joined hands with Nivin Pauly as hero named Stanley for the film. While Nivin Pauly in the lead role, Aju Varghese, Saiju Kurup and Siju Wilson plays supporting characters.

=== Filming ===
The shooting was started in March 2022. The director Rosshan Andrrews shared a behind the scene video of film shooting on 27 April 2022 that Roshan directing the film. He wrote along with the video, Shoot started... Saturday Night.. Cinematography was by Aslam K. Purayil, editor was T. Shivanandeeswaran.

== Music ==
The music was composed by Jakes Bejoy.

== Release ==
=== Theatrical ===
The film was released on 4 November 2022.

=== Home media ===
The digital rights of the film is acquired by Disney+ Hotstar and started streaming from 27 January 2023. The satellite rights of the film is acquired by Asianet.

== Reception ==
The Times Of India rated the film 3 out of 5 stars and wrote "A tale of tight friends that needed tighter editing". Indian express rated the film 0.5 out of 5 and wrote "This Nivin Pauly starrer is a huge disappointment".
