= Oru Vadakkan Selfie =

- Theatrical release poster
- Directed by: G. Prajith
- Screenplay by: Vineeth Sreenivasan
- Story by: Sarath Balan
- Produced by: Vinod Shornur
- Starring: Nivin Pauly; Vineeth Sreenivasan; Manjima Mohan; Aju Varghese; Neeraj Madhav
- Cinematography: Jomon T. John
- Edited by: Ranjan Abraham
- Music by: Shaan Rahman
- Production company: Cast N' Crew
- Distributed by: LJ Films; Popcorn Entertainments
- Release date: 27 March 2015
- Running time: 142 minutes
- Country: India
- Language: Malayalam
- Budget: ₹4 crore
- Box office: est. ₹25 crore

Oru Vadakkan Selfie (transl. A Northern selfie) is a 2015 Indian Malayalam-language road trip black comedy film directed by G. Prajith (in his directorial debut) and scripted by Vineeth Sreenivasan. The film features Nivin Pauly, Manjima Mohan, Vineeth Sreenivasan, Aju Varghese and Neeraj Madhav. The music was composed by Shaan Rahman. It was released on 27 March to positive reviews, and became one of the biggest grossing Malayalam films of the year. Some news media and the Kerala Film Producers Association called it the first successful Malayalam film of 2015. This movie marks the debut of Manjima Mohan as an actress in a Malayalam movie. Earlier, she appeared as a child artist in films, including Priyam and Sundara Purushan. The film was remade in Telugu as Meda Meeda Abbayi, and partially remade in Bengali as Bolo Dugga Maiki.

== Plot ==
Umesh Manohar is a 21-year-old lazy and spoilt mechanical engineering student in Cochin University of Science and Technology from Thalasherry who has 42 backlog subjects to clear. His close pals are Shaji and Thankaprasad. Wanting to find a quick way to earn money and fame, he decides to try his hand at movies and wants to assist none other than the renowned South-Indian Cinema director Gautham Vasudev Menon. Shaji suggests that Umesh make a short film and upload it on the internet, but the result is utter failure, after losing the camera in an accident. Umesh's father orders him to help him to run his small shop. To avoid such a bleak future, Umesh catches the next train to Chennai from his hometown, Thalassery, Kannur. On the train, he sees Daisy, his neighbour back home. Umesh tries to woo Daisy throughout the journey but miserably fails. He lies to his friends that they are having an affair, tricks her into posing for a selfie with him, and sends it to Shaji.

After spending six days in Chennai, realizing that he is not cut out for the struggle to enter the film industry, he returns to his town in Thalassery, where he finds a slew of people waiting for his return. He learns that his hometown is hot with news of his elopement with Daisy. The selfie clicked by him had created a big problem among his family and neighbours. He finds out that Shaji had been the one who told them. He returns to Chennai immediately with Shaji to find her and prove his innocence, where they meet a private detective named Jack Tracker, with whom he had fought earlier when chasing Daisy.

With the help of Jack, Umesh finds Daisy, and later, it is revealed that she is in love with a man named Harinarayan and wants to marry him. She also tells them that she had known him and communicated through social media, like Facebook and emails, but had never met him. Later, Umesh, Daisy, Shaji, and Jack set out to find Hari and they travel to his hometown, Pazhani. The group later manages to go to Hari's house with the help of a farmer Mohan, who is also a Keralite. It is revealed that Hari committed suicide a year before, as his friend and business partner, John Bhaskar, had cheated him in their business venture. John then used Hari's online accounts to cheat others.

While going back, Umesh recollects and realises that Jack already knew many things about Hari before and when Daisy and Hari's parents told about John Bhaskar, Jack said his full name with a middle name as John Mathew Bhaskar. Though confronted, Jack then reveals that his real name is Nivin and an officer from Tamil Nadu CBCID (Crime Branch Crime Investigation Department) economic investigation wing and he did all this to find the brains behind the online money fraud. He also says that the true intention of the guy on the Internet is to cheat young women and steal their money. After the confusion is cleared, Umesh, Daisy and Shaji goes back home and proves their innocence. A few months later, Umesh meets Nivin at a resort, where he tells Umesh that the cybercell group has found the real culprit, John. Nivin then lets Umesh vent out his anger on John for cheating on innocent girls as he did to Daisy. Umesh is then shown walking to a nearby table and asking whether the man sitting there is John. The movie ends with the man answering yes and Umesh smashing a bottle on his head.

== Cast ==
- Nivin Pauly as Umesh Manohar
- Vineeth Sreenivasan as DCP Nivin Mathews IPS in CBCID (Jack Tracker)
- Aju Varghese as Shaji Luke
- Manjima Mohan as Daisy George
- Neeraj Madhav as Thankaprasad "Thankamma"
- Vijayaraghavan as Manoharan
- Sreelakshmi as Umesh's mother
- P. Sukumar as George Joseph
- Maala Parvathi as Daisy's mother
- Revathy Sivakumar as Umesh's sister
- Bhagath Manuel as Shylesh
- Santhosh Keezhattoor as Mohan
- Harikrishnan as Surya Narayan
- Kottayam Pradeep as Shaji's father
- Gaurav Menon as Mohan's son
- Ganesh Raj as Umesh's Friend in College
- Geevarghese Eappen as Umesh's Friend in College
- Anwar Shareef
- Chethan Jayalal as CD Seller on the train
- Unni Mukundan as the real Harinarayanan (photographic appearance)
- Sharath Das (uncredited role)
- Vineeth Kumar as himself (guest appearance)
- Bobby Simha as John Mathew Bhaskar/fake Harinarayanan (guest appearance)
- Ramesh Thilak (guest appearance)
- Darshana Das as Model (Neelambalin song sequence)

== Reception ==
Filmibeat gave a rating of 3/5 and said "A hilarious entertainer for this Vishu season, which will make you laugh your heart out". Malayala Manorama gave a rating of 3.25/5. The Times of India mentions it to be "worth a watch for the performance of its vibrant cast and many moments of wit they pull off effortlessly" and awards a rating of 3/5 stars. The New Indian Express labeled it as "A Good-humoured Mass Selfie". International Business Times rated 3.5/5 stars and called it "A hilarious flick from Nivin Pauly-Aju Varghese team" and concluded "Overall, Oru Vadakkan Selfie is worth your time and money if you are looking ahead for a fun-filled day".

There have been announcements about remaking the film in Tamil, Telugu, Hindi, and Kannada. The remake rights for some of the languages have been sold while discussions regarding the others are progressing.

== Box office ==
Oru Vadakkan Selfie had what the IB Times called an "overwhelming start" in its first weekend, which resulted in many exhibitors increasing the number of screenings for the film. According to the Kerala Film Producers Association (KFPA), the film earned a distributor share of around ₹3 crore (US$310,000) in its first week of release. KFPA called the film as the "first super hit of 2015". The film stayed in the fifth position in its sixth weekend, owing to the release of new films. Suresh Shenoy stated that the Vishu festival season of 2015 had "turned out to be a dampener except for the continuing rush for Oru Vadakkan Selfie".

The production budget was around ₹4 crore (US$420,000). The gross collection is estimated as over ₹25 crore. The film ran for over 100 days and more in 24 releasing centres.

== Soundtrack ==
Oru Vadakkan Selfie

Soundtrack album to Oru Vadakkan Selfie by Shaan Rahman
- Released: 25 March 2015
- Recorded: 2015
- Genre: Feature film soundtrack
- Length: 19:31
- Language: Malayalam
- Label: Muzik 247
- Producer: Vinod Shornur

Shaan Rahman chronology
Aadu (2015)	Oru Vadakkan Selfie (2015)	Adi Kapyare Kootamani (2015)

The film's score and soundtrack were composed by Shaan Rahman. The lyrics were written by Vineeth Sreenivasan, Manu Manjith, and Anu Elizabeth Jose.

No.	Title	Lyrics	Singer(s)	Length
1.	"Chennai Pattanam"	Vineeth Sreenivasan	Vineeth Sreenivasan, Arya Mohandas	2:33
2.	"Neelambalin"	Manu Manjith	Arun Alat, Kavya Ajit	5:15
3.	"Paarvanavidhuve"	Anu Elizabeth Jose	Harish Sivaramakrishnan	3:36
4.	"Yekkam Pogavillai"		Shaan Rahman	1:35
5.	"Enne Thallendammaava"	Vineeth Sreenivasan	Shaan Rahman, Vineeth Sreenivasan	3:19
6.	"Kaikkottum Kandittilla"	Vineeth Sreenivasan	Vaikom Vijayalakshmi	3:13
Total length:				19:31
