= Jacobinte Swargarajyam =

2016 film by Vineeth Sreenivasan

- Theatrical release poster
- Directed by: Vineeth Sreenivasan
- Written by: Vineeth Sreenivasan
- Produced by: Noble Babu Thomas
- Starring: Nivin Pauly; Renji Panicker
- Cinematography: Jomon T. John
- Edited by: Ranjan Abraham
- Music by: Shaan Rahman
- Production company: Big Bang Entertainments
- Distributed by: LJ Films; Tricolor Entertainment
- Release date: 8 April 2016
- Running time: 145 minutes
- Country: India
- Language: Malayalam
- Budget: ₹3.5 crores
- Box office: ₹42.9 crores

Jacobinte Swargarajyam (transl. Jacob's Kingdom of Heaven) is a 2016 Indian Malayalam-language family drama film written and directed by Vineeth Sreenivasan. The film stars Nivin Pauly and Renji Panicker. It revolves around a wealthy businessman and the struggles faced by his son to clear his father's debts after a business associate cheats him. The film was released on 8 April 2016 in India and later in foreign countries.

== Plot ==
In 2008, Jacob Zachariah is a businessman settled in Dubai with his wife Sherly and four children, Jerry, Abin, Ammu and Chris. Jacob has always been respected by his colleagues for his ideas and had run many businesses prior to starting a steel business. After the Great Recession, Jacob strikes a deal through his colleague, Ajmal, and takes a total of 8 million dirhams from his investors. Ajmal cheats Jacob, and Jacob is left in a debt of 8 million dirhams, which he learns about on his 25th wedding anniversary. Jacob's credibility and trustful ways of business are lost and he is forced to travel to Liberia to finalize a deal, which fails and he is forced to stay there to avoid arrest. With continued complaints from investors, especially from Murali Menon, Jerry decides to solve his family's problems by stepping into his dad's shoes.

Jerry, without a trade license nor office, faces many difficulties at first. He decides to go out with what his father had taught him about business. He meets a self-made businessman, Yusuf Shah, and strikes a deal with him, eventually earning his trust and the business grows. Jerry motivates Abin to start a tours and travel company, and they succeed. Jerry is able to pay most of the debts and earns back the trust of the investors. However, Murali Menon pressurizes him for the full payment. Jerry and his mother close as many deals as they can and are able to collect money, but were only able to collect half of what they owed. Finally, Murali takes the case against Jerry to the court however the case is rejected as the case was registered against the owner of the company, which is under Jacob's name. Murali, who has also been affected by the recession, is forced to agree with Jerry's conditions.

Jerry expands his company with Yusuf Shah and clears his family's debts. He visits his father in Kerala, along with his girlfriend, Chippy. Jerry finds it difficult to communicate with his father, because he isn't the person he once knew. His mother intervenes and they break the tension between them and the family happily continue with their lives.

== Cast ==
- Nivin Pauly as Jerry Jacob Zachariah
- Renji Panicker as Jacob K. Zachariah
- Lakshmy Ramakrishnan as Shirly Jacob Zachariah
- Sreenath Bhasi as Abin Jacob Zachariah
- Aima Sebastian as Ammu Jacob
- Stacen Varghese as Chris Jacob Zachariah
- Vineeth Sreenivasan as Yusuf Shah
- Ashwin Kkumar as Murali Menon
- Saikumar as Philip
- Dinesh Prabhakar as Sijoy
- Reba Monica John as Chippy Susan John
- T. G. Ravi as Unni, Jacob's driver
- Aju Varghese as Abdul Sulaiman
- Gilu Joseph as Abdul's wife
- Murali Mohan as Kariachan
- Waleem Khan as Ajmal
- Sarayu Mohan as Sijoy's wife

== Production ==
The film was officially announced on 29 October 2015, which would be the fourth film collaboration of Nivin Pauly and Vineeth Sreenivasan after the successful films Malarvaadi Arts Club(2010), Thattathin Marayathu (2012) and Oru Vadakkan Selfie (2015). Gautham Vasudev Menon was confirmed in a role in the film, which was to be his acting debut. Later, Menon was replaced by Ashwin Kkumar. Vineeth explained "...Gautham Menon Sir was supposed to do an important role in our film. We got his dates and the shoot was planned for the first week of December in Dubai.. But then, Chennai Floods happened, airport was shut down and we couldn't bring him in. Rescheduling became impossible after that, due to several reasons,". Vineeth initially planned to essay the lead role of Jerry Jacob by himself beside directing the film. He happened to narrate the plot to Nivin in a casual conversation during the time when they were working in Oru Vadakkan Selfie (2015). After which, Nivin showed interest in Jerry but Vineeth was skeptical about casting him, but eventually did. Actor Aju Varghese joined as assistant director in the film.

Vineeth wrote the screenplay based on a real life incident of a NRI Malayali businessman Jacob Zachariah and his family after a business partner cheated them. Nivin Pauly's character is inspired by Gregory Jacob, Zachariah's son and friend to Vineeth. Beside Nivin, the film has Renji Panicker, Aima Rosmy Sebastian, Lakshmi Ramakrishnan, Sreenath Bhasi and Stacen portraying the family. Filming took place in Dubai, Ernakulam, and Ooty.

== Music ==
The film's score was composed by Shaan Rahman with the lyrics written by Manu Manjith, B. K. Harinarayanan, Rzee and Ashwin Gopakumar. A single, "Dubai", was released by the music label Muzik247 on 6 February 2016 via streaming platforms. The soundtrack album was released on 20 February 2016.

== Release ==
Jacobinte Swargarajyam released in India on 8 April 2016, with 92 screens in Kerala. The film released in 77 screens in rest of India with English subtitles. After few days of release, a special screening was held in Chennai for a selected audience from the Tamil film industry. The film released on 22 April in Asia-Pacific countries Australia, New Zealand, Singapore, Thailand, Japan, Hong Kong, and Brunei. The UAE release held on 4 May and followed by Qatar on 5 May.

== Reception ==
=== Critical response ===
The film received positive reviews from critics. Goutham V. S. of The Indian Express rated 3.5 stars out of 5 and stated that the director has showed discipline while handling dramatic situations and "has used his observations to good effect as the strong relationship bonds inside Jacob's family members and their informal homely behaviour was captured with shots that impart warmth and positive vibes, like the feel of an early morning coffee". He gave a special mention for the performance of Ashwin Kumar and praised the editing. Padmakumar K. of Malayala Manorama wrote "Being a story based on true incidents it could have been told in a more poignant manner. But Vineeth chose to play it safe by arranging the lighter and the turbid moments at regular intervals to make it an arresting narrative rather than delving deep into the heart of the issue" and rated 3 stars out of 5. He praised the performances of Renji Panicker, Lakshmy Ramakrishnan and Ashwin Kumar.

Gautaman Bhaskaran of Hindustan Times awarded 3 out of 5 and stated "The movie stays pretty much focussed – and does not stray into any romantic alleyways (though Jerry has a girlfriend) – except to include a few squabbles which one of Jerry's brothers gets into. These add a certain balance to the film's structure, and with performances by most of the cast members – particularly Pauly, Panicker and Ramakrishnan – disarmingly understated, Sreenivasan's work is captivating (sic)". He appreciated the editing. Akhila Menon of Filmibeat rated 3.5 out of 5 and praised the performances of Renji Panicker, Nivin Pauly, and Lakshmy Ramakrishnan. She wrote "The director has perfectly narrated the well-written script, with the right mix of light humour and emotional elements" praising Vineeth Sreenivasan. She also lauded the cinematography, editing and the songs, especially "Thiruvaavaniraavu".

Anu James of International Business Times awarded 4 out of 5 and mentioned "Although the movie is predictable, the beautiful moments we come across make us feel relaxed, eager to know how the movie progresses. The first half is totally a Renji Panicker show, while the second half belongs to Nivin as the hero". She praised the performances of Renji Panicker and Lakshmy Ramakrishnan, cinematography, editing, and songs. Sanjith Sidhardhan of The Times of India stated "Vineeth has taken extra effort to tell this real-life story as honestly as possible, the added attention may have dropped the entertainment quotient a tad. The film, however, makes up with several feel-good moments that accentuate the value of relationships". He praised the casting and performances of Lakshmi Ramakrishnan, Renji Panicker, Ashwin Kumar, and Nivin Pauly, and also cinematography and music. He rated 4 out of 5 stars.

Mani Prabhu of NDTV is written "the first hour of the film, which brilliantly establishes the Jacobs' kind of family, despite baiting us with continuous Vishu movie cliches, superbly spins each of them in tasteful angles", "the second half of the film, which gives all the opportunities for unabashed melodrama and parental sentiments, is surprisingly restrained, refreshing and free of bloat. The romantic track is brushed away confidently with a two-minute exposition. Characters don't go out of their way for the sake of entertainment". He also praised the performances of Nivin Pauly, Renji Panicker, Lakshmy Ramakrishnan, and Sreenath Bhasi. Sify described it "Emotional roller coaster" and wrote "...the story has been narrated in a highly conventional manner to the extent that things get a bit predictable at times. But considering this has been a real life story that a family actually went through, it can be justified generally". And appreciated the direction, cinematography, music and performances of Nivin Pauly, Renji Panicker, Lakshmy Ramakrishnan, and Sreenath Bhasi.

=== Box office ===
The film was made on a budget of ₹7.5 crore (US$780,000). It grossed ₹1.35 crore (US$140,000) in the opening day from Kerala box office. The collection was increased to ₹1.40 crore in the second day. It grossed ₹9.11 crore in 9 days of release in Kerala indicating a steady collection. Within two weeks, the film grossed ₹11.54 crore from Kerala. From Kochi multiplexes, it earned ₹1.53 crore in two weeks. The gross was over ₹15 crore within three weeks from Kerala. The film grossed ₹45.9 lakh (US$48,000) from U.S. box office in two weeks. and ₹60.72 lakh (US$63,000) in its third weekend. The film collected ₹18.9 crore (US$2.0 million) in the 35 days from the Kerala box office alone and earned ₹2.53 crore (US$260,000) from Ernakulam multiplexes alone, a record and also earned ₹75.96 lakh (US$79,000) from U.S. box office during its final run(fourth weekend). The film earned ₹82.24 lakh (US$85,000) from the United Kingdom-Ireland box office within the final run(third weekend). It grossed ₹25 crore (US$2.6 million) at the box office and completed 100 days in Kerala.

== Accolades ==
Award	Category	Winner(s)
Asiavision Film Awards	Best Supporting Actor	Renji Panicker
Asiavision Film Awards	Best Actor	Nivin Pauly
Asiavision Film Awards	Best Film	Vineeth Sreenivasan
Asianet Films Awards	Best Supporting Actor	Renji Panicker
Asianet Films Awards	Most Popular Duet	Unni Menon & Sithara
Kerala Film Critics Association Awards 2016	Best Screenplay	Vineeth Sreenivasan
Kerala Film Critics Association Awards 2016	Special Jury Award	Nivin Pauly
Kerala Film Critics Association Awards 2016	Second Best Actor	Renji Panicker
Kerala Film Critics Association Awards 2016	Second Best Film	Vineeth Sreenivasan
