= Nivin Pauly =

Indian actor, producer (born 1984)

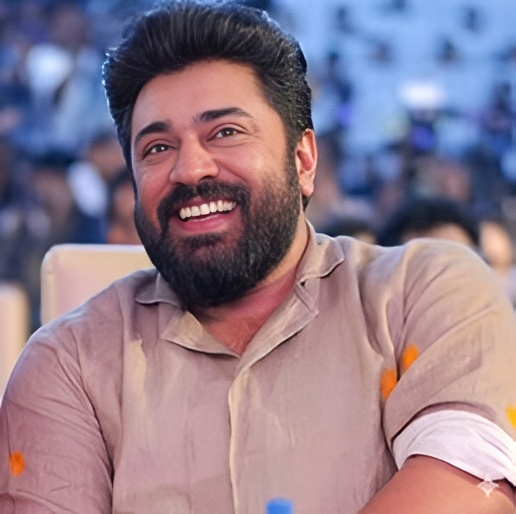
- Nivin Pauly in 2026
- Born: Nivin Pauly; 11 October 1984 (age 42); Aluva, Kerala, India
- Occupations: Actor; producer
- Years active: 2010–present
- Organization: Pauly Jr. Pictures
- Spouse: Rinna Joy (m. 2010)
- Awards: Full list

Nivin Pauly (born 11 October 1984) is an Indian actor and producer who works predominantly in Malayalam films. He is the recipient of two Kerala State Film Awards, three Filmfare Awards South, two Kerala Film Critics Association Awards, and seven SIIMA Awards. He made his acting debut in Vineeth Sreenivasan's directorial debut, Malarvaadi Arts Club, in 2010. The 2012 film Thattathin Marayathu pushed him into stardom.

Nivin came to be known for playing the boy-next-door archetype, following roles in the bilingual black-comedy thriller Neram (2013), the sports-drama 1983 (2014), the romantic-comedy Ohm Shanthi Oshaana (2014), the romantic-drama Bangalore Days (2014), the comedy road-thriller Oru Vadakkan Selfie (2015), and the coming-of-age romantic drama Premam (2015). He then went on to star in the police drama Action Hero Biju (2016), the family drama Jacobinte Swargarajyam (2016), the political satire Sakhavu (2017), the family comedy Njandukalude Nattil Oridavela (2017), and the epic film Kayamkulam Kochunni (2018), which emerged as one of the highest-grossing Malayalam films. and the romantic action comedy Love Action Drama (2019). He later starred in Sarvam Maya (2025), which grossed ₹150 crore worldwide during its theatrical run; Pinkvilla reported that it recorded the highest footfalls of Nivin Pauly's career, surpassing Premam. He subsequently starred in Bethlehem Kudumba Unit (2026), which grossed over ₹326 crore worldwide and was declared an industry hit, becoming the highest-grossing Malayalam film of all time.

Nivin made his debut as a producer with Action Hero Biju under his production company Pauly Jr. Pictures and has produced the films Njandukalude Nattil Oridavela and Kanakam Kaamini Kalaham (2021). The latter is the first Malayalam movie to premiere on Disney+ Hotstar.

He won the Filmfare Award for Best Male Debut for Neram (2013). In 2015, he won the Kerala State Film Award for Best Actor for his performances in Bangalore Days and 1983. He won the Filmfare Award for Best Actor – Malayalam for Action Hero Biju (2016). In 2020, he won the Kerala State Film Award for Best Actor -Special Mention for Moothon.

== Early life ==
Nivin Pauly was born on 11 October 1984 at Aluva in the Ernakulam district of Kerala. His parents are Pauly Bonaventure and Thressiamma Pauly, who were employed at Aarau, Switzerland. He was brought up in Kerala. He did his B.Tech. degree in Electronics & Communication Engineering from the Federal Institute of Science and Technology in Angamaly. He was employed at Infosys Ltd. in Bangalore through campus placements and was working there as a software engineer from 2006 to 2008. However, he resigned and returned home after his father's death.

== Career ==
=== Debut and breakthrough (2010–2012) ===
Nivin auditioned for Malarvaadi Arts Club and was cast by Vineeth Sreenivasan in the role of Prakashan, which marked his debut. Following this, he acted in the films The Metro and Sevenes, and did cameos in Traffic and Spanish Masala. He appeared in the music video Nenjodu Cherthu from the album Yuvvh.

The 2012 film Thattathin Marayathu became one of the biggest hits of the year. He played the role of Vinod, a Hindu boy madly in love with Ayesha, a Muslim girl. This was Vineeth Sreenivasan's second film as a director. This also secured his position as one of the finest actors in the Malayalam film industry. He received offers from directors, including Sathyan Anthikad, Rajesh Pillai, Aashiq Abu, and Shyamaprasad.

=== Rise to prominence (2013–2015) ===
Nivin made his debut in Tamil with the bilingual film Neram.The film was director Alphonse Puthren's directorial debut and was noted for its non-linear screenplay. His other Malayalam films in 2013 include 5 Sundarikal and Sunil Ibrahim's Arikil Oraal. The latter was a psychological thriller in which he played the role of Ichcha, a waiter at a café. In 5 Sundarikal, he acted in the segment "Isha" directed by Sameer Thahir. He also acted in Shyamaprasad's English: An Autumn in London where he portrayed the character of a London-born dapper playboy.

In 2014, he played the role of Rameshan in Abrid Shine's directorial debut 1983, a coming-of-age sports film. His portrayal of Rameshan from his school life, well into adulthood earned him the Best Actor Award at the 2014 Kerala State Film Awards. This film also fetched him multiple other awards including the Best Actor (Malayalam) at the Filmfare Awards South and South Indian International Movie Awards, and Most Popular Actor at the Vanitha Film Awards. This was followed by debutant Jude Anthany Joseph's romantic comedy Ohm Shanthi Oshaana, in which he portrayed the role of Giri and was released a week after 1983. "Sify" stated that the director Jude Anthany Joseph "creates an engaging enough drama in Ohm Shanthi Oshaana, that you're happy to emotionally invest in [it]." His next release Bangalore Days was the coming-of-age romantic comedy drama directed by Anjali Menon. Nivin essayed the role of Krishnan "Kuttan" P P, a software engineer who is judgemental about modern life without really thinking about his own hypocrisies. This role was also taken into account by the jury for the Best Actor award at the 2014 Kerala State Film Awards. The film was released in 205 theaters across India, making it one of the biggest releases for a Malayalam film at the time. In the same year, he played an extended cameo in the Lal Jose film Vikramadithyan, as an assistant district magistrate.

In 2015, Nivin appeared in Mili, Oru Vadakkan Selfie and Ivide. He plays the role of a soft-skills trainer, Naveen in Mili, directed by Rajesh Pillai. He followed this up with the "road-comedy film" Oru Vadakkan Selfie, directed by G. Prajith and scripted by Vineeth Sreenivasan.

He then acted in Premam, where he played the role of George David. It grossed over 600 million, and became one of the highest grossing Malayalam movies, catapulting him into the '50-crore club'. The film collected ₹2 crore from Tamil Nadu box office in its 300 days theatrical run making it the highest grossing Malayalam film in Tamil Nadu at the time. Nivin's portrayal of George was featured in the Film Companion's 100 Greatest Performances of the Decade. Praising his performance, the Film Companion wrote: "His performance had charm, mischief, and most impressively, vulnerability."

=== Continued success and critical acclaim (2016–2021) ===
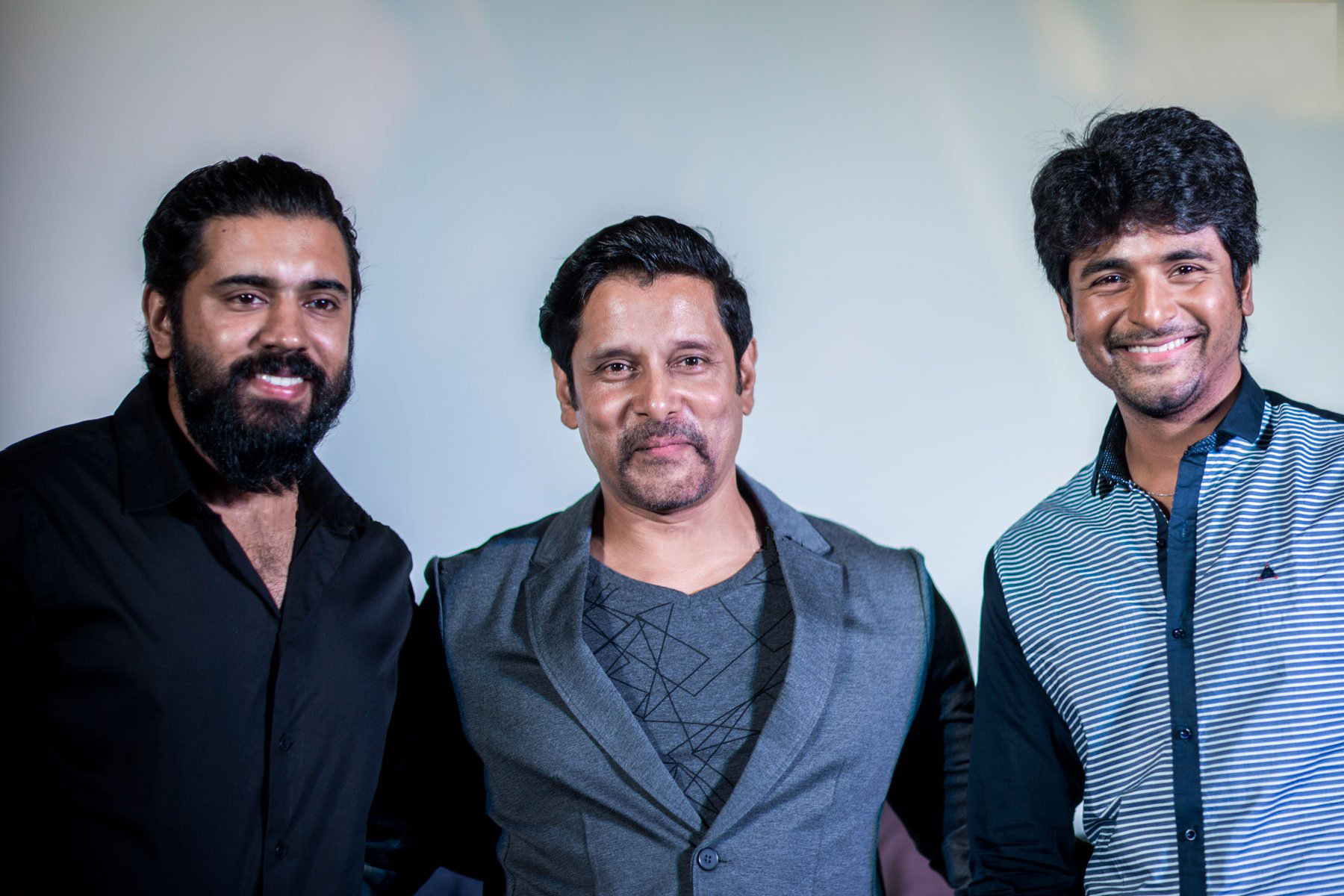
Nivin with Vikram and Sivakarthikeyan at Iru Mugan film audio launch event.

Nivin produced Action Hero Biju in 2016 under his banner Pauly Jr. Pictures. The film, a police procedural drama, was directed by Abrid Shine. As sub-inspector Biju Poulose, the film and the role portrays an honest look at the life of a police official. The film also has the highest opening gross for a Malayalam film in Tamil Nadu. The movie was well received by the police fraternity in Kerala. He also starred in the family-drama Jacobinte Swargarajyam directed by Vineeth Srinivasan. Based on a true story, he played the role of Jerry, the son of Jacob Zacharia who struggles to clear his father's debts.

His next film was a political drama Sakhavu in which he played dual roles. Directed by Sidhartha Siva, this was the first dual role in his career, where he portrayed a student political leader and a senior social activist and comrade who fights for his left-wing ideals.

Nivin appeared in his first straight Tamil feature film through Gautham Ramachandran's crime drama Richie (2017), where he portrayed a small town thug. He also starred in the dramedy Njandukalude Nattil Oridavela. This film was his second outing as a producer. The film which was received well at the box office was a heart-warming story which portrayed that cancer is never the end of the road for everyone involved.

In 2018, the big-budget movie Kayamkulam Kochunni, directed by Rosshan Andrrews made a significant impact at the Kerala box office, and across all territories that it was released as well. This film put Nivin in the 100 crore club. He came together with Shyamaprased for a third time for the romantic-comedy Hey Jude (film). Nivin plays the role of a mathematical genius, yet socially awkward Jude who like his namesake Beatles song finds himself in spite of his perceived shortcomings.

In 2019, Nivin played the role of Dr Mikhael John in Haneef Adeni's action-thriller Mikhael. This was followed by Love Action Drama, a romantic comedy which also saw commercial success at the box office. Nivin next appeared in Geetu Mohandas' film Moothon which was screened at several international film festivals worldwide including Toronto International Film Festival, New York Indian Film Festival, FFAST (Paris), Indian Film Festival of Melbourne and Mumbai Film Festival. He won the award for the best actor at the New York Indian Film Festival for his role in Moothon. Nivin portrayed the dark and demoralising world of Moothon as Akbar which fetched him the Kerala State Film Awards – Special Mention in 2019. The film was the screened as the opening film at the Mumbai Film Festival Mumbai Academy of the Moving Image and as the grand finale at the Indian Film Festival of Melbourne. Nivin's role as Akbar in this film was also featured in Film Companion's 100 Greatest Performances of the Decade.

In 2021, he starred in Ratheesh Balakrishnan Poduval's Kanakam Kaamini Kalaham, a family drama with satire and absurd-comedies elements.

=== Recent work, career fluctuations and resurgence (2022–present) ===
The fantasy film Mahaveeryar was Nivin's first release of the year directed by Abrid Shine and was released on 21 July 2022, to critical acclaim. However, the film underperformed at the box office. The climax of the film was later changed, which was better received by the audience. The teaser of Mahaveeryar garnered 6 million views within 24 hours of its launch making it the then most viewed teaser in Malayalam cinema. His next film, action thriller Padavettu, an action thriller directed by debutant Liju Krishna had its theatrical release on 21 October 2022, to critical acclaim from the critics but didn't performed well at the box office. The trailer of Padavettu was launched to a full house at the inaugural match of the Indian Super League 2022 at the Jawaharlal Nehru International Stadium, Kochi; making it the first film to have the trailer launch at the ISL. This was followed by the comedy drama Saturday Night, directed by Rosshan Andrrews, which released on 4 November 2022. It received largely negative reviews from both the critics and audience, alike, and failed at the box office. In 2023, Nivin appeared on screen as Mattanchery Moidu in Rajeev Ravi's film Thuramukham. Though it opened to mixed reviews, Nivin was praised for his sublime performance. Then he appeared in Ramachandra Boss & Co which received negative reviews and ended up as a box office bomb.

In 2024, he appeared in Varshangalkku Shesham, directed by Vineeth Sreenivasan, in a cameo role as Nithin Molly which received widespread praise from the audience for his performance and the film was a commercial success. His next film Malayalee from India, directed by Dijo Jose Antony, was released to mixed reviews and underperformed at the box office.

After a series of commercial setbacks, he made a huge comeback with the Christmas 2025 release Sarvam Maya, directed by Akhil Sathyan, the son of Sathyan Anthikad. It received generally positive reviews and became a huge commercial success, grossing over ₹150 crores worldwide and marking a revival in his career.

His film Baby Girl, a medical thriller directed by Arun Varma, was released on 23 January 2026. His upcoming projects include the Tamil film Yezhu Kadal Yezhu Malai, directed by Ram, as well as Action Hero Biju 2, Gangster of Mundanmala, Shekara Varma Rajavu, and the LCU entry Benz. He has also announced a new project titled Dear Students, which will be produced under his home banner.

== In the media ==
Following his appearance in Premam, Nivin was chosen as the Most Desirable Man of 2015 by Kochi Times.

In early 2017, Nivin appeared as himself in the short film "No Go Tell" directed by Jude Anthany Joseph. This viral film was vetted by the Kerala State Commission for Protection of Child Rights and focuses on creating awareness among children about sexual abuse and child body safety.

Nivin was also part of the Kerala Strikers team in the Celebrity Cricket League. In addition, he was named the youth ambassador of the Kerala Blasters for the third edition of the Indian Super League.

== Philanthropy and services ==
Nivin was noted for his contributions during the unprecedented floods of 2018 in Kerala. He visited relief camps in his hometown of Aluva and arranged basic necessities for the flood-affected people. He also met Chief Minister Pinarayi Vijayan to hand over his donation towards the Chief Minister's Distress Relief Fund (CMDRF).

He was also in the news for the "On-Call" campaign, where he called and spoke to patients and healthcare workers during the lockdown, encouraging and thanking the latter for their selfless service.

Nivin was also a part of the launch of the "Drug-Free Kerala" campaign of the Vigilance and Anti Corruption Bureau (VACB) against corruption and narcotic substances

== Personal life ==
Nivin married Rinna Joy on 28th August 2010 at the St. Dominic's Church in Aluva. The couple were classmates at the Federal Institute of Science and Technology. They have a son and a daughter. He resides with his family in Kochi.

== Filmography ==
=== Films ===
Key
†	Denotes films that have not yet been released

- All films are in Malayalam, unless otherwise noted.

Year	Title	Role	Notes	Ref.
2010	Malarvaadi Arts Club	Prakashan		
2011	Traffic	Car driver in the last scene	Cameo appearance	
2011	The Metro	Harikrishnan		
2011	Sevenes	Shaukath		
2012	Spanish Masala	Mathews	Cameo appearance	
2012	Thattathin Marayathu	Vinod		
2012	Bhoopadathil Illatha Oridam	Murali		
2012	Puthiya Theerangal	Mohanan		
2012	Chapters	Krishnakumar		
2012	Da Thadiya	Rahul Vaidyar		
2013	Neram	Mathew (Malayalam); Vetri (Tamil)	Bilingual film in Malayalam and Tamil	
2013	My Fan Ramu	Himself	Cameo appearance	
2013	English: An Autumn in London	Sibin		
2013	5 Sundarikal	Jinu	Anthology film; Segment: Isha	
2013	Arikil Oraal	Icha		
2014	1983	Rameshan	Kerala State Film Award for Best Actor	
2014	Ohm Shanthi Oshaana	Giri Madhavan		
2014	Bangalore Days	Krishnan P.P. aka "Kuttan"		
2014	Vikramadithyan	Lokesh Kumar IAS	Cameo appearance	
2015	Mili	Naveen		
2015	Oru Vadakkan Selfie	Umesh		
2015	Ivide	Krish Hebbar		
2015	Premam	George David		
2016	Action Hero Biju	Biju Paulose	Also producer	
2016	Jacobinte Swargarajyam	Jerry Jacob		
2016	Aanandam	Akash	Cameo appearance	
2017	Sakhavu	Krishnakumar & Sakhavu Krishnan		
2017	Njandukalude Nattil Oridavela	Kurien Chacko	Also producer	
2017	Richie	Richard K. Sagayam (Richie)	Tamil film	
2018	Hey Jude	Jude Rodriguez		
2018	Kayamkulam Kochunni	Kayamkulam Kochunni		
2019	Mikhael	Dr. Mikhael John		
2019	Love Action Drama	Dineshan		
2019	Moothon	Akbar/ Bhai	Kerala State Film Award Special Mention	
2021	Kanakam Kaamini Kalaham	Pavithran	Disney+ Hotstar film, also producer	
2022	Mahaveeryar	Swami Apoornnananthan	Also producer	
2022	Padavettu	Ravi Koroth		
2022	Saturday Night	Stanley		
2023	Thuramukham	Mattanchery Moidu		
2023	Ramachandra Boss & Co	Ramachandra Boss	Also producer	
2024	Varshangalkku Shesham	Nithin Mulanthuruthy aka Nithin Molly	Extended cameo appearance	
2024	Malayalee From India	Aalparambil Gopi		
2025	Sarvam Maya	Prabhendhu N. Namboothiri (Prabha/Indu)		
2026	Baby Girl	Sanal Mathew		
2026	Prathichaya	John Varghese, Chief Minister of Kerala		
2026	Bethlehem Kudumba Unit	Justin Davis "Mp3 King"		
2026	Yezhu Kadal Yezhu Malai	8000-year old immortal man	Tamil film	
2027	NP51 †	TBA	Filming	
2027	Benz †	Walter	Tamil film; dual role; Filming	

=== Short films ===
List of Nivin Pauly short film credits
Year	Film	Director(s)	Role	Language	Ref.
2011	Eli – the sexy tale (Note: The short film directed by Alphonse Puthren was later included in the 2016 Tamil anthology film Aviyal.)	Alphonse Puthren	Eli	Tamil	
2013	Oru Thundu Padam	Basil Joseph	Vinod Nair	Malayalam	(Note: Reused footage from Thattathin Marayathu.)
2017	No go tell	Jude Anthany Joseph	Himself	Malayalam	
2026	Soulmates - Oru Saathukkudi Pranayam	Joel Davis	Justin Davis	Malayalam	

=== Web series ===
Key
†	Denotes films that have not yet been released

List of Nivin Pauly web series credits
Year	Film	Director	Role	Language	Platform	Ref.
2025	Pharma	P. R. Arun	K P Vinod	Malayalam	JioHotstar	

=== As a producer ===
Key
†	Denotes films that have not yet been released

- All films are in Malayalam, produced under Nivin Pauly's home banner Pauly Jr. Pictures unless otherwise noted.

List of Nivin Pauly film credits as producer
Year	Film	Director(s)	Notes	Ref.
2016	Action Hero Biju	Abrid Shine		
2017	Njandukalude Nattil Oridavela	Althaf Salim		
2021	Kanakam Kaamini Kalaham	Ratheesh Balakrishnan Poduval	Release on Disney+ Hotstar.	
2022	Mahaveeryar	Abrid Shine		
2023	Ramachandra Boss & Co	Haneef Adeni		
2026	Dear Students †	George Philip Roy; Sandeep Kumar		

=== Music videos ===
List of Nivin Pauly music videos credits
Year	Song	Video	Director(s)	Language	Ref.
2012	Yuvvh	Nenjodu Cherthu	Alphonse Puthren	Malayalam	
2016	Spirit of Chennai	Spirit of Chennai	Vikram	Tamil	
2024	Habibi Drip	Yella Habibi	Dabzee, Ribin Richard	Malayalam	

=== Story idea ===
List of Nivin Pauly film story ideas
Year	Film	Director	Notes	Ref.
2016	Oru Muthassi Gadha	Jude Anthany Joseph	Credited for story idea in the end credits	

== See also ==
- Thrissur Magic FC
- Listin Stephen
