= Action Hero Biju =

2016 film by Abrid Shine

- Theatrical release poster
- Directed by: Abrid Shine
- Screenplay by: Abrid Shine; Muhammed Shafeekh
- Story by: Abrid Shine
- Produced by: Nivin Pauly; Shibu Thekkumpuram; Abrid Shine
- Starring: Nivin Pauly; Anu Emmanuel; Saiju Kurup; Joju George; Alexander Prasanth; Kalabhavan Prajod; Rony David; Sohan Seenulal
- Narrated by: Lal Jose
- Cinematography: Alex J. Pulickal
- Edited by: Manoj
- Music by: Songs: Jerry Amaldev; Aristo Suresh; Score: Rajesh Murugesan
- Production companies: Pauly Jr. Pictures; Full On Studios
- Distributed by: LJ Films & Tricolor Entertainment
- Release date: 4 February 2016 (India)
- Running time: 150 minutes
- Country: India
- Language: Malayalam
- Budget: ₹5 crore
- Box office: ₹32 crore

Action Hero Biju is a 2016 Indian Malayalam-language police procedural comedy film directed by Abrid Shine. The film stars Nivin Pauly, Anu Emmanuel, Saiju Kurup, Joju George, Alexander Prasanth, Kalabhavan Prajod, Rony David and Sohan Seenulal. Nivin jointly produced the film with Abrid Shine and Shibu Thekkumpuram. Jerry Amaldev composed the original songs, while Rajesh Murugesan composed score. Principal photography began in May 2015 and ended in October 2015.

After being postponed several times, Action Hero Biju was released in Kerala on 4 February 2016 and rest of India the following day. The film was a commercial success. Nivin Pauly won Filmfare Award for Best Actor – Malayalam for his performance in this film in 2016 at 64th Filmfare Awards South.

== Plot ==
The film revolves around SI Biju Paulose and other officers, who handle a series of different types of complaints and cases, petty and major, that are registered at the police station. One day, Biju receives a call from the hospital informing him of a 12-year-old girl who gets mauled by a dog when she tried to pluck some mangoes from a highly influential businessman Samson Tharakan's house. The eyewitnesses report stated that the businessman had purposefully let the dog out. Biju sets out to his house to arrest the businessman. However, some local politicians try to use their political power to prevent the case from being registered. Biju tracks the culprit from a club and arrests him.

The next complaint resolved was lodged by a lady who was yet to receive her salary. When Biju tries to mediate a negotiation between the employers and the lady, the employers act callously which enrages Biju. He threatens to shut down their company for registration inaccuracies if the dues are not paid; the employers immediately comply. Later, Biju encounters a case of a suicide attempt of a woman and the subsequent missing of a Navy personnel who jumps in the sea to rescue the woman and her child. During the subsequent search, he and his subordinates manage to save the woman. The child dies as people who rescued the child from the river assumed that she died and emergency services didn't take her to the hospital on time.

This affects Biju emotionally and no clues have been found to locate the missing Navy man. Through the course of the next few days, he resolves different cases including that of an auto driver who stalks a married woman he loves, bikers without helmet and a drunk who steals a wireless-set from a careless cop Minimon. When investigating a substance abuse and battering case by an adolescent he goes after the rising narcotics sales that targets school children, he discovers a group of teenagers purchasing marijuana from a notorious criminal during random vehicle checks.

Biju arrests them in the presence of the magistrate and takes them to police station and uses third degree interrogation on the criminal and informs the parents of the teenagers. Biju after giving warnings lets them off without registering the case to avoid spoiling their future. Later he solves a case regarding eloping of a timid Pavithran's wife Sindhu with their daughter. Biju tackles a case assigned by his superiors whereby some jewels stolen from a house. Deducing from the clues and circumstances, Biju suspects the housemaid Bhavani is the thief. He visits her and during interrogation, finds flaws in her alibi.

They confirm her as the culprit and arrests her. Meeting her husband Rajendran and children, her daughter Raji is a respected SPC student cadet whom he knows; Biju faces moral dilemma when he learns the mother did it to pay school fees. Biju half-heartedly follows the law and takes housemaid Bhavani to station. Through an informant, Biju is informed of the location of a few wanted criminals in his jurisdiction. As he corners and apprehends them, he gets injured when one of the criminals stabs him, but Biju successfully manages to prevent them from escaping until the rest of the police force arrives.

As he is treated for his wounds in the hospital, he jokes with his fiancée Benitta Dominic that injuries are common in his occupation and that she is free to marry someone else. Later, it is shown that he survived and that he is apprehending another gang of criminals. In the middle of this, Biju's father calls and informs him that Benitta has given birth to a daughter. He joyfully receives the news, but continues his assigned task of arresting the criminals. A voice over briefs that Biju is not a superhero but one of the many dedicated cops in the state.

== Cast ==
- Nivin Pauly as SI Biju Paulose
- Anu Emmanuel as Benitta Dominic a.k.a. Kunjumol
- Saiju Kurup as CI Manoj Mathew
- Joju George as Senior Civil Police Officer Minimon
- Kalabhavan Prajod as Civil Police Officer Nrupan
- Rony David as Civil Police Officer Subair
- Sohan Seenulal as Civil Police Officer Madhu
- Sreeja Das as Civil Police Officer Mariya Joseph
- Major Ravi as City Police Commissioner Rajasekhar IPS
- Suraj Venjaramoodu as Pavithran
- Rohini as Bhavathi
- Meghanathan as Rajendran, Bhavathi's Husband
- Parvathi T as Benitta's mother
- Aristo Suresh as drunkard
- Abhija Sivakala as Sindhu, Pavithran's wife
- Kochu Preman as Pathrose, Benitta's uncle
- Sajan Palluruthy as Kumar, Auto-rikshaw driver
- Balachandran Chullikkadu as Paulachan, Biju's father
- Valsala Menon as Benitta's relative
- Devi Ajith as Rizwan's mother
- Ambika Mohan as Benitta's relative
- Jayashree Sivadhas as SPC cadet leader
- Vinduja Menon as Nithya, Hari's wife
- Madan Mohan as the Indian Navy officer
- Madhu Mohan as Shahjahan, Attingal DySP
- Bobby Mohan as Dominic, Benitta's father
- Manju Vani as Sherly
- Binoy Antony as Binoy
- Srikant Murali as Advocate Ayyappan
- Alexander Prasanth as Jose Pottakuzhy, Politician
- Jude Anthany Joseph as Shinto
- Rajesh as King Cobra, the wireless thief
- Azees Nedumangad as Thommi, a card player

== Production ==
=== Development ===
In August 2014, after the success of Shine's debut film 1983, Shine announced his next project, Action Hero Biju, would star Nivin Pauly. It was reported that Nivin, Abrid and Shibu Thekkumpuram would both produce the film under Pauly's production banner Pauly.Jr Pictures and Shine's Full on Studios. From scripting to post-production it almost took two years and the scripting of the film taken ten months to complete which Abrid collaborated with Muhammed Shefeeq.

It was earlier reported that Nivin Pauly will be seen as a police officer in the film. For the role Nivin took physical training and workouts, special fighting classes and followed special diets to gain more weight and followed workout regimens, to fit the role of a police officer, he spent time with police officers to understand the real feel of a police and to make it realistic.

About the title, the director says "The title, Action Hero Biju, stems from my interest in narrating a common man's story. Biju is an extremely common and secular name in Kerala and I felt it has cuteness about it. My film tells the story of a common man who becomes a brave cop, and I felt the title is a perfect fit". He also explained "The film is a light take on policing, it is not the hardcore police kind of story – it is a mix of humour and action. It is about a police sub-inspector's heroism. We see the world through his eyes – we experience his views, experiences and emotions". The title was announced in September 2014.

=== Casting and crew ===
Nivin Pauly was selected to play the title character of the film sub-inspector Biju. Anu Emmanuel who made her debut as a child artist in Swapna Sanchari (2011) was placed to play the female lead, who was suggested by her father and producer Thankachan Emmanuel.

In July 2015 director Jude Antony Joseph signed to play a minor role in the film. Joju George, Saiju Kurup, Kalabhavan Prajod, and Major Ravi were confirmed to do police roles. Suraj Venjaramoodu and Jayasree who worked on 1983 was called to act in the film, in addition around 35 actors were selected to play smaller roles in the film. Suresh Thampanoor was introduced in the film by Abrid when he saw a small WhatsApp video clip of Suresh performance, he was totally impressed and Suresh was into the film.

The Cinematography was given to Alex J. Pulickal, background score to Rajesh Murugesan and lyrics were written by Santosh Varma and Harinarayanan. The veteran music director Jerry Amaldev composed the music for the film, he composed songs for the film after a long break of 20 years. Editing for the film was panned by Manoj, while sound designer was Raja Krishnan, whereas art direction by M Bawa and costume design by Remya Suresh.

=== Filming ===
Filming began in May 2015. The film was shot in Fort Kochi, Kochi, Kerala. When Anu Emmanuel came for the filming almost 50 per cent of the project was shot. Filming was wrapped up in October 2015 in Kochi and was given for post-production in November.

== Music ==
The soundtrack for the film was composed by Jerry Amaldev after a long break of 20 years. Rajesh Murugesan composed the background score of the film while Santhosh Varma and BK Harinarayanan wrote the lyrics. Satyam Audios own the audio rights of the film and was released in YouTube by Satyam Audios itself. The film features 4 tracks. The tracks for the film were recorded in Yesudas's studio in Chennai and were mastered in New York City. Jerry Amaldev was chosen to compose the songs for the film by Abrid. Abrid met Jerry at his house a few months before the filming where he told Jerry that "he is tired of electronic music and is looking for some good melodies and acoustic instrumented songs".

Aristo Suresh, who also acted in the film as a drunkard sung the song "Muthe Ponne Pinangalle" which is a folk song, was also composed and wrote by him it was released on 11 February 2016. The song became popular on social media and received good reviews. Pookkal Panineer Pookkal sung by KJ Yesudas and Vani Jayaram, is a duet which Jerry started working on it in November 2015. Jerry Amaldev used acoustic instruments only for all songs. Long ago Jerry heard a Young India gramophone version of Vande Mataram which was composed by Rabindranath Tagore. It was a monophonic composition and had a chorus he added the song to the film by adding a small difference. It was sung in the film by Swetha Mohan.

== Track listing ==
No.	Title	Singer(s)	Lyricist	Length
1	"Pookkal Panineer"	K. J. Yesudas, Vani Jayaram	Santhosh Varma	4:23
2	"Oonjalilaadi Vanna"	Chinmayi	Santhosh Varma	4:14
3	"Chiriyo Chiri"	Vineeth Sreenivasan, Vaikom Vijayalakshmi	Santhosh Varma	3:27
4	"Hara Hara"	B. K. Harinarayanan	Suchith Suresan	4:00
5	"Muthe Ponne Pinangalle"	Aristo Suresh	Aristo Suresh	1:40
6	"Vande Mataram (Cover)"	Swetha Mohan	Bankim Chandra Chattopadhyay	1:59

== Release ==
=== Theatrical ===
The film was released on 4 February 2016 in 131 screens in Kerala and in 116 screens in rest of India and in more than 10 screens in the United States on 5 February. It was released on 68 screens in the United Arab Emirates on 25 February 2016. The film was distributed by LJ Films of Indian film director Lal Jose. Daiwik Films distributed the film in the UAE.

=== Home media ===
Action Hero Biju was released on DVD and VCD by Satyam Audios on 24 May 2016.

== Reception ==
=== Critical response ===
Veeyen of Nowrunning.com lauded the film. He states that "the cinematic reconstruction of the life of a police officer that Abrid Shine attempts in 'Action Hero Biju' is efficient to the core, and the craft elements on display exceptional. The mother of all gambles that the film indulges in - of keeping conventionalities at bay - makes it a level-headed film that traverses the rugged planes of law, justice, truth and life with consummate ease."

Arathi Kannan of Malayala Manorama rated of 3.5/5 and said "With a salute to the cops, who sweat their ways through their duties and moral obligations, Abrid Shine leaves a sparkling note of thanks before the screen blackout."

S.R. Praveen writing for The Hindu criticised the film for glorifying custodial torture by police especially at a time when Kerala Police was facing criticism for a spate of custodial deaths across the state. Glorification of sexist and racist remarks uttered by Nivin's character were also called out in the review.

=== Box office ===
The film grossed ₹17.2 crores in Kerala and over ₹30 crores worldwide. It opened well in Tamil Nadu, grossing ₹65 lakhs in the opening day from more than 12 screens, which is the highest opening gross for a Malayalam film there. The film grossed an estimated total of ₹32 crores worldwide. The film ran over 100 days in theatres.

== Sequel ==
In February 2024, coinciding with the eighth anniversary of the release of the film, a sequel titled Action Hero Biju 2 was announced with Abrid Shine returning as the director.

== Accolades ==
Date of ceremony	Award	Category	Recipient(s) and nominee(s)	Result	Ref.
18 November 2016	Asiavision Awards	Best Actor – Malayalam	Nivin Pauly	Won	
20 January 2017	Asianet Film Awards	Popular Actor	Nivin Pauly	Won	
20 January 2017	Asianet Film Awards	Best Director	Abrid Shine	Won	
12 February 2017	Vanitha Film Awards	Best Movie on Social Awareness	Action Hero Biju	Won	
12 February 2017	Vanitha Film Awards	Popular Actor	Nivin Pauly	Won	
12 February 2017	Vanitha Film Awards	Best Supporting Actress	Rohini	Won	
12 February 2017	Vanitha Film Awards	Best Lyricist – Malayalam	Santhosh Varma ("Pookkal Panineer")	Won	
28—29 March 2017	IIFA Utsavam	Best Director – Malayalam	Abrid Shine	Nominated	
28—29 March 2017	IIFA Utsavam	Best Actor – Malayalam	Nivin Pauly	Nominated	
28—29 March 2017	IIFA Utsavam	Best Female Playback Singer – Malayalam	Vani Jairam ("Pookkal Panineer")	Nominated	
17 June 2017	Filmfare Awards South	Best Film – Malayalam	Action Hero Biju	Nominated	
17 June 2017	Filmfare Awards South	Best Director – Malayalam	Abrid Shine	Nominated	
17 June 2017	Filmfare Awards South	Best Actor – Malayalam	Nivin Pauly	Won	
17 June 2017	Filmfare Awards South	Best Music Director – Malayalam	Jerry Amaldev	Nominated	
17 June 2017	Filmfare Awards South	Best Female Playback Singer – Malayalam	Chinmayi ("Oonjalilaadi Vanna")	Won	
30 June – 1 July 2017	South Indian International Movie Awards	Best Film – Malayalam	Action Hero Biju	Nominated	
30 June – 1 July 2017	South Indian International Movie Awards	Best Director – Malayalam	Abrid Shine	Nominated	
30 June – 1 July 2017	South Indian International Movie Awards	Best Actor – Malayalam	Nivin Pauly	Nominated	
30 June – 1 July 2017	South Indian International Movie Awards	Best Actor Critics' Choice – Malayalam	Nivin Pauly	Won	
30 June – 1 July 2017	South Indian International Movie Awards	Best Supporting Actor – Malayalam	Suraj Venjaramoodu	Nominated	
30 June – 1 July 2017	South Indian International Movie Awards	Best Supporting Actress – Malayalam	Rohini	Nominated	
30 June – 1 July 2017	South Indian International Movie Awards	Best Comedian – Malayalam	Joju George	Won	
30 June – 1 July 2017	South Indian International Movie Awards	Best Lyricist – Malayalam	Santhosh Varma ("Pookkal Panineer")	Won	
30 June – 1 July 2017	South Indian International Movie Awards	Best Female Playback Singer – Malayalam	Vani Jairam ("Pookkal Panineer")	Nominated	
