= Malarvaadi Arts Club =

Malarvadi Arts Club
- Theatrical release poster
- Directed by: Vineeth Sreenivasan
- Written by: Vineeth Sreenivasan
- Produced by: Dileep
- Starring: Nivin Pauly; Aju Varghese; Bhagath Manuel; Harikrishnan; Geevarghese Eappen; Nedumudi Venu
- Narrated by: Vineeth Sreenivasan
- Cinematography: P. Sukumar
- Edited by: Ranjan Abraham
- Music by: Shaan Rahman
- Production company: Graand Production
- Distributed by: Kalasangham Films; Manjunatha Release
- Release date: 16 July 2010 (India)
- Country: India
- Language: Malayalam
- Budget: ₹1.75 crore

Malarvadi Arts Club is a 2010 Indian Malayalam-language comedy-drama film written and directed by Vineeth Sreenivasan in his directorial debut and produced by Dileep. In the film, five friends take the responsibility of reviving their favourite hang-out as they are unhappy with its functioning. However, they end up facing various problems while trying to keep the club alive. This film featured the debut of Nivin Pauly.

The film was released on 70 screens in Kerala alone. The cast of five young boys and two girls was selected through a talent hunt. The film was a commercial success at the box office.

== Plot ==
The story is about five friends in a small village called Manissery. They have completed their studies and are all set to move to the next phase of their life. But in the process, they face unexpected problems while trying to keep their favourite hangout, Malarvadi Arts Club, alive.

"Malarvadi Koottam" (Malarvadi guys) are a bunch of trouble makers in the Manassery village. They even act as goons for a Communist party, named Labour Party. The film's first half is about the pointless lives of these five, led by Prakashan. Prakashan, who has a fiery temperament and would do anything for the people he loves, and for the cause he believes in.

In a moment of financial crisis, Kumaran, their mentor who formed the Malarvadi club, makes the group take up music again. On the way, the best singer, Santhosh Damodaran, in the group gets to attend a reality show. Predictably, he makes it big, which is followed by misunderstandings, separation, and a grand reunion in the end.

== Cast ==
- Nivin Pauly as Prakashan
- Aju Varghese as Kuttu
- Bhagath Manuel as Purushu
- Harikrishnan as Praveen
- Geevarghese Eappen as Santhosh Damodhar
- Nedumudi Venu as Kumarettan
- Jagathy Sreekumar as Raghavan
- Sreenivasan as Blade Bhaasi
- Suraj Venjaramoodu as Shekaran
- Salim Kumar as Kattappuram Sashi
- Janardhanan as Nelloor Gopalan
- Kottayam Nazeer as Preman
- Manikandan Pattambi as Sudhakaran
- Lishoy as Damodaran
- Malavika Wales as Geethu
- Apoorva Bose as Revathy
- Deepak Parambol as Rameshan
- Sreeram Ramachandran as Geethu's brother
- Renjith Reghu as Susheelan
- Siju Wilson as Mohanlal fan club secretary
- Nandan Unni as Villager
- Sreejith Vijay as Bhasi's assistant
- Deepika Mohan as Damodaran's wife

== Soundtrack ==
The film's soundtrack contains six songs, all composed by Shaan Rahman, with lyrics by Vineeth Sreenivasan.

#	Title	Singer(s)
1	"Manyamaha Janangale"	Vineeth Sreenivasan, Sachin Warrier, Rajesh Menon, Rakesh Kishore, Sharath
2	"Kaathu Kaathu"	Shaan Rahman
3	"Innoree Mazhayil"	Rahul Nambiar, Vineeth Sreenivasan
4	"Changaayi"	Vineeth Sreenivasan, Sujatha Mohan
5	"Snehame"	Rajesh Menon
6	"Aayiram Kaatham"	Vineeth Sreenivasan, Shaan Rahman, Sachin Warrier, Divya S. Menon

== Reception ==
=== Box office ===
The film opened on 70 screens in Kerala alone on 16 July 2010 and was a commercial success at the box office. The film was made on a cost of ₹1.75 crore and earned an amount of ₹2 crore.

=== Critical response ===
The movie received positive reviews.

Paresh C Palicha of Rediff gave the film 3.5 out of five stars praising Vineeth Sreenivasan on his directorial debut and stated that "Malarvadi Arts Club shows that Vineeth Sreenivasan does hold promise as a director, who can only improve with experience. He has made a film that will make the viewer smile". Sify rating it as Watchable movie said "The five new heroes, who were selected after talent hunts and rehearsal camps, have performed quite well".
