= Roshan Abdul Rahoof =

Indian actor

- Born: 23 April 1998 (age 28); Abu Dhabi, United Arab Emirates
- Occupations: Actor, Dancer
- Years active: 2019
- Notable work: Oru Adaar Love

Roshan Abdul Rahoof is an Indian actor who predominantly works in Malayalam film Industry, who debuted in the Malayalam movie Oru Adaar Love, directed by Omar Lulu. Roshan along with Priya Prakash Varrier became a sensation on social platforms after the release of the song Manikya Malaraya Poovi and the classroom sequence in the teaser from the movie Oru Adaar Love.

== Personal life and career ==
Roshan was born in Abu Dhabi. He is from Guruvayur. He competed in the 3rd season of the dance reality show D3 - D4 Dance with his brother Raees Abdul Rahoof in 2016 His father is named Abdul Rahoof. He has four siblings named Raees, Rashid, Seesha Naz, and Rinciya Ciya.

== Filmography ==
- All films and series are in Malayalam language

=== Films ===
| Year | Title | Role | Notes |
|---|---|---|---|
| 2019 | Oru Adaar Love | Roshan | |
| 2024 | LLB | Roshan | |
| 2024 | Aanandhapuram Diaries | Adithyan | |
| 2025 | Ronth | Roshan | |
| 2025 | If On A Winter′S Night | Abhi | |
| 2026 | Merri Boys | Sarin | |

=== Web series ===
Key
| † | Denotes television productions that have not yet been released |

| Year | Title | Role | Platform | Ref. |
|---|---|---|---|---|
| 2026 | Cousins and Kalyanams † | TBA | JioHotstar | |
