= Android Kunjappan Version 5.25 =

2019 film directed by Ratheesh Balakrishnan Poduval

- Theatrical release poster
- Directed by: Ratheesh Balakrishnan Poduval
- Written by: Ratheesh Balakrishnan Poduval
- Produced by: Santhosh T. Kuruvilla
- Starring: Suraj Venjaramoodu; Soubin Shahir; Sooraj Thelakkad; Kendy Zirdo; Saiju Kurup
- Cinematography: Sanu Varghese
- Edited by: Saiju Sreedharan
- Music by: Bijibal
- Production company: Moonshot Entertainments
- Distributed by: Maxlab Cinemas and Entertainments
- Release date: 8 November 2019 (India)
- Country: India
- Language: Malayalam

Android Kunjappan Version 5.25 is a 2019 Indian Malayalam-language science fiction comedy-drama film written and directed by Ratheesh Balakrishnan Poduval (in his directorial debut), produced by Santhosh T. Kuruvilla, and starring Suraj Venjaramoodu, Soubin Shahir, Sooraj Thelakkad, Kendy Zirdo, and Saiju Kurup. It is loosely based on the 2012 film Robot & Frank.

The music was composed by Bijibal. In the plot, Subramanian (Soubin Shahir) goes to Russia for work, leaving his old-age father Bhaskaran Poduval (Suraj Venjaramoodu) with an android called Kunjappan (Sooraj Thelakkad) to take care of him. Bhaskaran, however, hates the idea.

The film was released in India on 8 November 2019. It received critical acclaim and was one of the commercially successful Malayalam films released in the year. The movie won three Kerala State Film Awards including Best Actor award for Suraj.

== Plot ==
In Kerala, Bhaskaran Poduval (Suraj Venjaramoodu) is a stubborn old man who is very reluctant to adapt to modern technology and is therefore seen as a 'boomer' by some of the younger men in town. He resides in Payyanur with his son, Subramanian alias Chuppan (Soubin Shahir), a mechanical engineer. He is first seen at the Bali ceremony of his friend Kunjappan, who is shown to be a rather short man. As Kunjappan's son Vinu is in the middle of performing the ritual, Bhaskaran questions some aspects of it, eventually infuriating Vinu, who storms off in a rage.

Bhaskaran wants his son to remain by his side during his final days, which is why he forbids him from applying for jobs and insists that he refuse any job offer he receives. Frustrated, Subramanian insists on going to Russia, as he has secured a job at a Japanese Robotics firm there. This leads to an argument between father and son, which ends with Subramanian leaving for Russia.

Once there, he meets Hitomi, the daughter of a Malayali father and a Japanese mother, who is very fond of Kerala and Keralites. They form a close bond, and Hitomi tells Subramanian about her father, who died of Alzheimer's. She also introduces him to the robotic home nurse (an android) who cared for her father during his final days. While repairing the robot, he receives a call from his cousin Prasannan (Saiju Kurup), who takes care of Bhaskaran, informing him that the maid Subramanian had employed to look after Bhaskaran was unsuitable and that he should return home immediately. Subramanian feels guilty about his inability to care for his father, and he discusses the idea of resigning with Hitomi and his boss. However, his boss persuades him not to give up a promising career for a task that someone else can do.

Subramanian returns home with the latest Android Robot (Version 5.25) to care for his father. Although Bhaskaran is initially hesitant to accept the robot into his life, and is even somewhat frightened of it at first, he eventually develops a strong liking for it and unexpectedly becomes deeply attached to it. The robot is named Kunjappan (lit. short man), which creates some confusion among the locals, as Vinu's father shares the same name. Slowly, the robot becomes irreplaceably close to Bhaskaran's heart. Kunjappan also helps Bhaskaran reconnect with his former lover Soudamini on Facebook.

Soon enough, Bhaskaran begins to see Kunjappan as his own son. However, Subramanian becomes increasingly worried about Bhaskaran and decides to quit his job and return home along with Hitomi. Subramanian convinces Bhaskaran to go to the local pond for his bath without Kunjappan. However, after sharing a meal with Subramanian, Bhaskaran sees Hitomi repairing a disassembled Kunjappan. Enraged by the sight, Bhaskaran tries to stop her, but Subramanian restrains him. Bhaskaran furiously asks what Subramanian is playing at, and Subramanian angrily replies that the robot will eventually kill him. Bhaskaran shouts back that even if Subramanian cannot take care of him, he should at least allow Kunjappan to do so. Knowing that his father may suffer cardiac arrest if he becomes too agitated, Subramanian restores Kunjappan to its previous state.

That night, Hitomi and Subramanian watch CCTV footage of an earlier model robot strangling an elderly customer to death — the same man shown at the beginning of the film being attacked. They do not realise what the elderly man had done to provoke the robot into killing him. Alarmed, Subramanian discovers that Bhaskaran and Kunjappan are missing. Bhaskaran has left home with Kunjappan for a nearby forest, where he believes they can live undisturbed. Meanwhile, Subramanian and Hitomi, accompanied by Prasannan, search for them and eventually arrive at the forest.

After Bhaskaran sends a message to Soudamini, Kunjappan tells him that Subramanian was right: he is not a human being, but merely a machine designed to assist him. He says that he neither wants nor understands Bhaskaran's love, and asks Bhaskaran to leave him in the forest and return home. Bhaskaran becomes emotional and heartbroken upon hearing this. When Subramanian finally finds Bhaskaran, Vinu attacks Kunjappan and steals its head. Triggered by its in-built security reflex, Kunjappan strangles Subramanian when he attempts to deactivate the robot. However, Bhaskaran saves Subramanian and pulls Kunjappan's arm away, finally realising how dangerous the robot can be. Afterwards, Bhaskaran, Subramanian, Hitomi, and Prasannan return home, while Kunjappan, abandoned in the forest, begins to glitch before shutting down permanently. During the ride home on the back of Subramanian's motorcycle, Bhaskaran hallucinates Subramanian as Kunjappan and softly whispers Kunjappan's name.

== Cast ==
- Suraj Venjaramoodu as V. K. Bhaskaran Poduval
- Soubin Shahir as Subramanian (Chuppan), Bhaskaran's son
- Sooraj Thelakkad as Android Kunjappan Version 5.25, a humanoid robot
- Saiju Kurup as Prasannan
- Kendy Zirdo as Hitomi
- Parvathi T. as Soudamini
- Rajesh Madhavan as Vinu
- Sivadas Kannur as Murali
- Unni Raja as Tailor Raghu
- Renji Kankol as Babu
- Bhanumathi Payyannur as Karthyani
- Megha Mathew as Seetha
- Ratheesh Balakrishnan Poduval as Subramanian's boss

== Production ==
Android Kunjappan Version 5.25 marks the directorial debut of Ratheesh Balakrishnan Poduval who has also written the screenplay. Soubin Shahir was the first actor to be cast in the film. For the role of 80-year old Bhaskara Poduval, an older actor was being sought; but Soubin and producer Santhosh T. Kuruvilla suggested Suraj Venjaramood who is in his 40s and works primarily as a comedian. The film is set in Payyannur, Kannur district and the characters speak Kannur dialect. When Thiruvananthapuram-based Suraj (who has a Thiruvananthapuram accent) was brought on board, Poduval thought of giving the character a Thiruvananthapuram background to justify the mixed accent. But Suraj adapted to the Kannur accent so well that such a change became unnecessary. For the half Japanese half Malayali character Hitomi, the plan to bring any Japanese actors proved to be difficult and they cast Kendy Zirdo who was from Arunachal Pradesh. For the Android robot, the plan was to use VFX throughout the film, but due to budget constraints, Sooraj Thelakkad who is popular as a mimicry artiste in television shows played the role of the robot in the movie. Sooraj dressed up himself as the robot for the movie. Most of the audience thought that a real robot was used in the movie. But the filmmakers also later confirmed that Sooraj was behind the robot.

Filming began in Saint Petersburg, Russia in May 2019. It was completed in July 2019.

== Music ==
Android Kunjappan Version 5.25

Soundtrack album by Bijibal
- Released: November 9, 2019
- Studios: Bodhi Music Spot, Ernakulam
- Genre: Feature film soundtrack
- Language: Malayalam
- Label: Goodwill Entertainments

Bijibal chronology
Nalpathiyonnu (41) (2019)	Android Kunjappan Version 5.25 (2019)	Puzhikkadakan (2019)

The film features songs composed by Bijibal, with lyrics by B. K. Harinarayanan and A. C. Sreehari.

No.	Title	Lyricist	Singer(s)	Length
1	"Kayarillaa Kettilpettu"	B. K. Harinarayanan	Mithun Jayaraj	3:32
2	"Pularaan Neram"	B. K. Harinarayanan	Sooraj Santhosh	3:26
3	"Shilayude Maatile"	B. K. Harinarayanan	Vipinlal	3:19
4	"Ormappoove Poru"	A. C. Sreehari	G. Sreeram, Vrinda Shameek	3:04

== Release ==
=== Theatrical ===
Android Kunjappan Version 5.25 was released in India on 8 November 2019 and outside India and the United States on 21 November 2019. The film was available on Amazon Prime Video from 19 December 2019

=== Home media ===
The film dubbed in Telugu as Android Kattappa 5.25 and released on streaming platform aha

== Reception ==
=== Box office ===
In the overseas opening weekend, it grossed £4,770 (₹4.4 lakh) from 51 screens in the United Kingdom, A$5,858 (₹2.86 lakh) in Australia, and US$2,905 (₹2.09 lakh) from 4 screens in Canada. In two weeks, it amassed US$4,746 (₹3.41 lakh) in Canada and £7,394 (₹6.85 lakh) in the UK, and in three weeks, US$22,717 (₹16.16 lakh) in the United States and A$7,150 (₹3.48 lakh) in Australia. According to Kerala Film Producers' Association's statistics, Android Kunjappan Version 5.25 is one among the seven Malayalam films out of the 192 films released in 2019 that profited from the box office revenue alone.

=== Critical response ===
The New Indian Express rated 4 out of 5 stars and said that "this is one of those films whose synopsis can be described in one line but explores a myriad of conflicts, emotions, and themes ... the overall effect is that of watching a live-action Pixar film. Android Kunjappan is one of the best films of the year", also praised the actors' performances, particularly Suraj's. Sify rated 3.5 in a scale of 5 and wrote: "With an interesting idea, the writer-director packages an engaging drama with smart scenes, with a good dose of comedy and sentiments ... Android Kunjappan version 5.25 is a delightful comedy that may not be perfect, but gives enough good moments to the viewer" and praised the "terrific form" of Suraj. Firstpost also rated 3.5 out of 5 stars, stating that "Android Kunjappan is unrelentingly funny, yet it is at all times profoundly philosophical", the film's "all-round adorability overshadows its flaws and moments of hesitation" and that Soubin is "pitch perfect" and Suraj is "astonishingly good".

Rating 3.5 out of 5 stars, Manorama Online said that "Android Kunjappan has a fresh and intriguing plot ... even though the focus is on AI and futurism, the sharp satirist in Ratheesh is at play throughout the film. As the scriptwriter, he has managed to craft some caricature-like characters and situations suited for a rustic scenario, without affecting the flow of the movie even a bit". The News Minute also rated 3.5 out of 5, and stated that "this story about an old man and a robot is very, very refreshing indeed for the Malayalam film industry. It has its flaws, but the rawness of the script is endearing", but "the script however falters towards the last few minutes, when it seems to lose direction", but "as far as debuts go, this one scores, and Ratheesh's name shall be remembered", while also praising Suraj's performance.

The Times of India rated 3 out of 5 stars and states that there are many wonderful moments in the first half, "be it as technology, some refreshing comic bits, novel characterizations, story settings and more, the film impresses", but post-interval, "the kind of nemesis created for Kunjappan is impact-less, and the presentation of complications in the situation also emerge a bit dull". Still, "the movie can reward someone with a taste for sci-fi comedies". The Hindu wrote that "at the core, the filmmaker is handling an age-old theme in our cinema, on the need to take care of the elderly ... although there is the expected moralizing that comes with the theme, the film almost stays clear of preaching ... the scriptwriter appears a little clueless as to how to end it all, which probably led to the slightly contrived climactic sequences", but praised the performance of Suraj. Baradwaj Rangan of Film Companion South wrote "The small scenes work beautifully but the bigger themes aren't handled as well. And the unhinged ending is tonally off".

=== Accolades ===
Kerala State Film Awards

- Best Actor - Suraj Venjaramood
- Best Debut Director - Ratheesh Balakrishnan Poduval
- Best Art Director - Jothish Shankar

Indian Recording Arts Academy Awards

- Best Sound Designer (Film - Regional) - Jayadevan Chakkadath

== Sequel ==
In July 2021, it was announced that a sequel for the movie titled Alien Aliyan is in early development. Director Ratheesh Balakrishnan said that the sequel belongs to the sci-fi humour genre and is currently in the final stages of scripting. However, he also revealed that the movie doesn't follow the original's story even though the robot, which was abandoned by the end of the film, will make an appearance.

== Remake ==
The film was remade in Tamil as Koogle Kuttappa.
