= Manikya Malaraya Poovi =

Malayalam song

- Song cover

Song by Vineeth Sreenivasan

from the album Oru Adaar Love
- Language: Malayalam
- Released: February 2018 (original version in 1978)
- Recorded: 2017 (original version in 1978)
- Genre: Filmi, Mappila
- Length: 3:17
- Label: Muzik 247
- Composers: Thalassery K Refeeque (originally in 1978); Shaan Rahman (for the film)
- Lyricist: PMA Jabbar

"Manikya Malaraya Poovi" is a Mappila song originally composed by Thalassery Rafeeque in 1978 and performed by Eranjoli Moosa. The song which was later recomposed by Shaan Rahman for the 2018 Malayalam film Oru Adaar Love is sung by Vineeth Sreenivasan. It became the fastest video from South India to receive 50 million views on YouTube.

== Background ==
Manikya Malaraya Poovi is considered one of the finest songs in the Mappila Song, a folklore Muslim music genre in Kerala. Originally composed by Thalassery K. Refeeque in 1978, it was written by P. A. Jabbar and performed by Eranjoli Moosa. The song is also considered one of the best performances by Moosa and he has performed it in several stages. The song compares the beauty of Khadijah, the wife of Muhammad, to a pearl flower, during her first interaction with him. In 2018, the song was recreated by Shaan Rahman for the film Oru Adaar Love directed by Omar Lulu and was sung by Vineeth Sreenivasan.

== Popularity ==
Before its release, a short clip from the song, that shows the actress Priya Prakash Varrier winking was released which became viral on social media. Later, the song also became trending on YouTube upon its release and became the fastest South Indian video to get 50 million views.

== Controversy ==
A group of Muslims filed a fatwa complaint with the Hyderabad police, saying the visuals in the song hurt their religious sentiments, since the song contained references to Muhammad's wife Khadija. Raza Academy, which represents the Sunni Muslims of the Barelvi sect in Mumbai demanded to cut the objectionable portions of the song, and threatened to launch a nation-wide agitation if their demand was not met. The Supreme Court of India ruled against them.
