= Sivaram Mony =

Indian film director and editor

Shivaram Mony
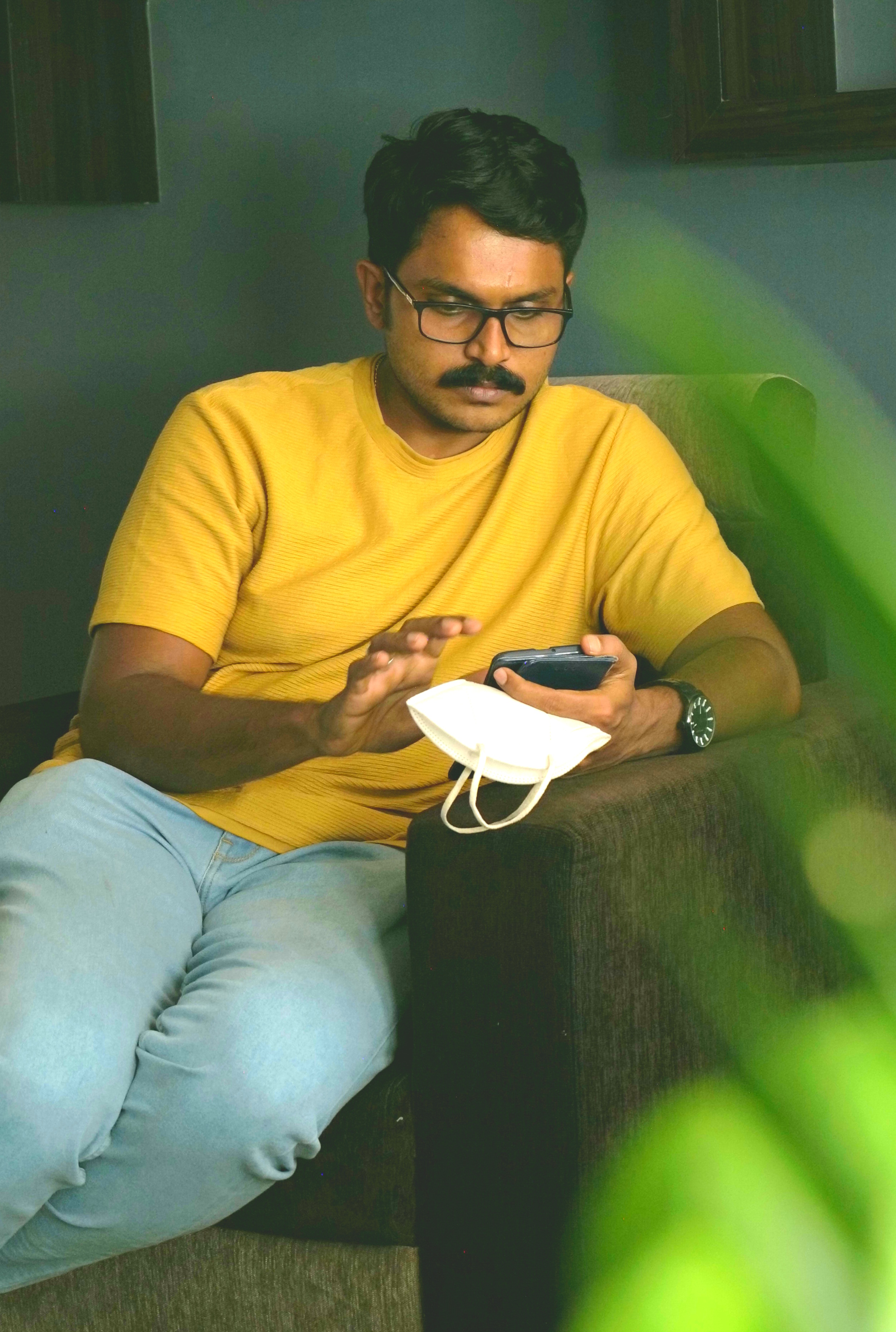
- Mony at the sets of Shubhadinam in 2022
- Born: Shivaram; Thiruvananthapuram, Kerala, India
- Education: Dr G R Damodaran College of Science, Coimbatore
- Occupations: Film director, editor, actor
- Years active: 2006–present

Shivaram Mony (born 1989) is an Indian feature film director, actor and editor who works in Malayalam cinema. He made his directorial debut through Matchbox produced by Revathy Kalamandir owned by G.Suresh Kumar & Menaka. His second feature as a director, editor and a writer was Thi.Mi.Ram which was released on NeeStream OTT platform in April 2021. Thi.Mi.Ram was selected to be included in the Indian Panorama of Chennai International Film Festival 2021. His third feature film is Shubhadinam which was directed and edited by him. Currently he is working on his next feature along with a new generation web series project. He owns and operates his own production house named The Social Scape.

== Early life ==
Shivaram was born in 1989 in Thiruvananthapuram, Kerala. He did his schooling in Kendriya Vidyalaya, Trivandrum. He acquired his bachelor's degree in Visual communication with gold medal from Dr G R Damodaran College of Science, Coimbatore.

== Career ==
=== 2006–2011 ===
Sivaram started off as a short film maker in 2006. Since then he went on to make several short films which won awards in International and National film festivals. In 2008, he moved to Coimbatore and was based there until 2011. During that time, he completed his under graduation.

=== 2011–2016 ===
Sivaram worked based out of Chennai during this time period and was known among his counterparts as an editor and director. He also worked in several media related agencies as creative director and editor. He made his entry into mainstream cinema as location editor and worked for several Tamil films. In 2016, he shifted his base back to his hometown Trivandrum to work in Malayalam industry.

=== 2017–present ===
Sivaram debuted as feature film director with Matchbox, which was released in 72 theatres across Kerala. The film rights were purchased by Asianet. His second feature as a director, editor and a writer was Thi.Mi.Ram which was released on NeeStream OTT platform in April 2021. Thi.Mi.Ram was selected to be included in the Indian Panorama of Chennai International Film Festival 2021. The film bagged 23 awards in international film festivals around the globe. His ongoing feature film is Shubhadinam which is directed and edited by him starring Indrans and Gireesh Neyyar. Film is released on October 14, 2022 in 50 theatres across Kerala and had a run of 21 days in the theatres.

== Filmography and acting career ==
Year	Film	Cast	Notes
Feature films (Director)
2021	Shubhadinam	Indrans, Gireesh Neyyar, Mereena Micheal	Writer, Director and Editor
2019	Thi.Mi.Ram	K K Sudhakaran, Vishak Nair, Meera Nair	Writer, Director and Editor
2017	Matchbox	Roshan Mathew, Vishak Nair, Drishya Raghunath	
Shortfilms and documentaries and music videos (Director)
2006	Mizhineerpookal		
2007	Preritham		
2007	Culprit		
2009	Aazhangal		
2010	Dhruvam		
2011	Unheard		
2013	In Conversation with God		
2013	Vishwakshema (Documentary)		Film on Gurukulam education
2014	Dil Chahta Hai Ki Band Baja Baarat Ke Saath Dilwale Dulhaniya Le Jayenge		
2014	Legends of Tomorrow		A film on IFB Boca juniors
2014	Pakshi Pani Bheethi Venda (Documentary)		A film by Kerala Veterinary and Animal Sciences University
2015	Pillow Talk		
2015	One Health for Man Animal and Nature (Documentary)		A film by COHEART
2015	Mizhiyile, a music video by OHM		
2016	My Hero		
2016	Scope		
Editor
2014	Un manam sollum A promotional song from Gubeer (2014)		
2015	Theemai dhaan vellum, a promotional song from Thani Oruvan (2015)		
2020	LAXMI		Malayalam web series
Actor
1997	The Car directed by Rajasenan	child artist	Feature Film
1998	Kondattam - directed by K. S. Ravikumar	child artist	Feature Film
1999	Aayiram Meni- directed by I.V.Sasi	child artist	Feature Film
2000	Vidhi	child artist	TV Serial telecasted in Asianet
2009	Aazhangal	as interviewer	Short film
2001	Kaliyalla kalyanam	child artist	TV Serial telecasted in Kairali TV
2010	Dhruvam	as hero's friend	Short film
2012	Screwed time stacks	as lead actor- directed by Deepak	Short film
2013	In Conversation with God	as chess player	Short film
2014	Foto	as lead actor- directed by Vanathi Kathir	Short film
2017	Matchbox directed by Sivaram Mony	as Sathyan (Guest Appearance)	Feature Film
2019	Thi.Mi.Ram directed by Sivarom Mony	as Kuttan (Guest Appearance)	Feature Film
2020	Johny Antony	as lead actor- directed by Nazim Rani	Short film
2022	Shubhadinam	as Associate Director in Audition Scene (Guest Appearance)	Feature Film
2020	LAXMI	as Annan	Web series

== Accolades ==
=== Awards for feature film ===
- Kerala State Film Critics Awards 2020
- Tagore International Film Festival, Kolkatta 2020, Best Feature Film
- Panjim International Film Festival (Piff 2020) Goa, Best Feature Film & Best Director
- Druk International Film Festival (Diff2020) Bhutan, Best Feature Film
- 7th Art Independent International Film Festival (Saiiff2020)-kerala
- Virgin Spring Cine Fest (Vscf 2020) Kolkata, Best Director
- International Panoramic Film Festival of India 2021, Honorary Mention for Direction
- Prisma International Film Festival 2020, Rome, Official Selection
- Bricks International Film Festival (Biff 2020), Moscow, Official Selection
- Straight Jacket Guerilla Film Festival 2020, Official Selection
- Indic Film Utsav 2020, Official Selection
- Indian Panorama at 18th Chennai International Film Festival (Ciff),
- Sun of the East Awards 2020, Kolkata - Nominee for Best Feature Film
- Golden Galaxy Awards 2020, Kolkata - Nominee for Best Feature Film
- Creator in Crisis Film Festival 2020, Singapore - Best Director

=== Awards for short films ===
- Preritham: Special jury teen, Teenreels (Kerala Chalachithra Academy, 2007)
- Aazhangal: Best film, Bimbam International short film festival, 2010
- Therefore, we: Best editor, AISFDF 2013
- In conversation with god: best film, best director, AISFDF 2014 Coimbatore.
- Vishwakshema: Best documentary AISFDF 2014 Coimbatore.
- Legends of tomorrow: Best documentary, Christ college Bengaluru 2015 & AISFDF 2015
- Wings of Fire: Best Editor, My Mumbai short film festival 2015.
- The unheard: CANON best PSA award, 2012
- My Hero: Top 15 Deserving Films of Yes I am the Change 2016
