= Dhamaka (2020 film) =

2020 Indian film

- Theatrical release poster
- Directed by: Omar Lulu
- Screenplay by: Sarang Jayaprakash; Venu O. V. Kiran Lal
- Story by: Omar Lulu
- Produced by: M. K. Nazar
- Starring: Mukesh; Urvashi; Innocent; Nikki Galrani; Arun Kumar
- Cinematography: Sinoj P. Ayyappan
- Edited by: Dileep Dennis
- Music by: Gopi Sundar
- Production company: Good Line Productions
- Distributed by: Good Line Release
- Release date: 2 January 2020
- Country: India
- Language: Malayalam

Dhamaka (transl. Blast) is a 2020 Indian Malayalam-language comedy film directed by Omar Lulu and written by Sarang Jayaprakash, Venu O. V. and Kiran Lal from a story by Lulu. The film stars Mukesh ,Arun Kumar and Nikki Galrani with Dharmajan Bolgatty, Hareesh Kanaran, Sabumon Abdusamad, Urvashi, and Innocent in supporting roles. The film has music composed by Gopi Sundar. The plot follows Eyo (Arun) and his search for remedies after finding out that he has erectile dysfunction on his wedding night.

== Plot ==
Eyo is bad in studies and all that he does is fool around with his friend Siva. As Eyo's father is sure that his son is never going to achieve anything in life and he himself is having a cash crunch, he wants his son to marry Annie, a wealthy divorcée. After a series of jokes about her being divorced, Eyo is smitten by her charm when he sees her. They marry soon after. As Annie had challenged her ex-husband saying she will marry a younger man and have a baby in the tenth month of her marriage, she is in a hurry to have a child.

But as it turns out, Eyo is unable to “prove his manliness in bed”, as he explains it later to Dr. Saxena, a sexologist who is also an expert on IVF. The “Tsunami mix” given by the doctor to boost the boy's sexual urge is mistakenly taken by Eyo's father and his mother becomes pregnant. This is disliked by Eyo and Annie as it is a shame for him to be a brother at the age he is supposed to be a father. He and Annie are now in a hurry to have a child so he again meets Saxena who puts forward the idea of IVF as a remedy. They both agree to this.

One day in his dad's absence, Eyo takes his mother for checkup to a government college. His mother mentions Eyo's problem to a doctor, who mentions the fraud activities by such unethical doctors like Saxena. The doctor asks him to go for a honeymoon and take their own time. A happy Eyo calls doctor to thank him for both his medicine and advice that helped him in the bed, as it is revealed that the medicine was mere vitamins given by the doctor just to boost Eyo's confidence. After a few months it is shown that in a happy baby shower the entire family rejoice the arrival of new guests.

== Cast ==
- Mukesh as Pauly
- Arun A. Kumar as Eyo Pauly
- Nikki Galrani as Annie / Ann Maria, Eyo's wife
- Urvashi as Annamma Pauly
- Dharmajan Bolgatty as Shiva, Eyo's friend
- Hareesh Kanaran as Dr. Sexena / Biju
- Innocent as Pauly's father
- Sabumon Abdusamad as Britto, Annie's first husband
- Edavela Babu as Annie's father
- Shaalin Zoya as Pinky, Eyo's sister
- Salim Kumar as Dr. Gopinath
- Sooraj Thelakkad as Britto's bodyguard
- Neha Saxena as Thresia
- Michelle Ann Daniel as Maggie
- Saraf Sabith as Friend at Pataya Hotel
- Ponnamma Babu as Valyammachi
- Kalabhavan Haneef
- Molly Kannamaly as Maria Chedathi
- Sabith Shajahan as Annie's brother
- Binu Adimali as Family Court advocate
- Pareekutty as Advocate clerk
- Noorin Shereef as dancer in "Adipoly Dhamaka"
- Omar Lulu as a dancer in "Adipoly Dhamaka"
- Fukru as a dancer in "Adipoly Dhamaka"

== Production ==
Arun, who played a role as a child artist in Olympiyan Anthony Adam, was roped in to play the lead role. The film is directed by Omar Lulu of Oru Adaar Love fame.

== Soundtrack ==
The music and background score of the film were composed by Gopi Sundar.

Track list

1- "Kandittum Kanatha" - Bleslee (BigBoss Malayalam 1st Runner Up)

2- "Potti Potti" - Gopi Sundar

3- "Happy Happy Nammal" - Gopi Sundar, Afsal, Sithara, Swetha Ashok, Sachin Raj, Aswin Vijayan

4- "Kattumundedye" - Vidhu Prathap

5- "Ee Ventheeram" - Najim Arshad

6- "Vazhikattum" - Najim Arshad

7- "Kattumundedye" - Pranavam Shashi

8- "Adipoli Dhamaka" - Sayanora Philip, Swetha Ashok, Akbar Khan, Nanda J Devan

== Release and reception ==
The film was initially scheduled to release on 28 November before the release date was pushed to 2 January.

The Times of India gave the film 3 out of 5 stars stating that "The film considers issues like quick-fix solutions, ageism and also our language, and calls for a rethinking on these". Cinema Express gave the film a rating of one-and-a-half out of five stars and wrote that "The movie's ideas seem to have been inspired by the dirty jokes and trolls on social media which come from the imagination of teenagers".

Sajin Shrijith of Cinema Express rated the movie 1.5 out of 5 and wrote "After Oru Adaar Love, Omar Lulu returns with Dhamaka, another movie that gives tough competition to the former in the patience-testing department. I can't tell which of the two is more potent in that regard. The movie's ideas seem to have been inspired by the dirty jokes and trolls on social media which come from the imagination of teenagers. With one cringe-inducing scene (and song) after the other, Dhamaka continually assaults our senses. And just like his previous movies, Omar takes tunes from popular Malayalam flicks and use them for “explosive” moments in his film. The awkwardness generated is so high that one wishes for Harry Potter's invisibility cloak."

Sify called it a "lowbrow comedy".
