= Eranjoli Moosa =

Mappilappattu singer (1940–2019)

Eranholi Moosa
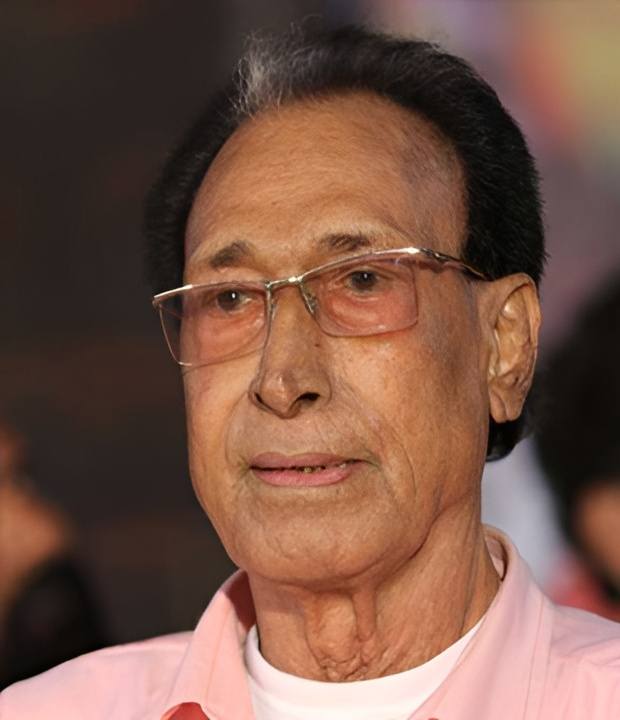
- Eranjoli Moosa

Background information
- Born: Valiyakath Moosa; March 18, 1940; Thalassery, Malabar District, Madras Presidency, British India (present-day Kannur, Kerala, India)
- Died: May 6, 2019 (aged 79)
- Genres: Mappila songs
- Occupation: Singer
- Years active: 1974–2019

Eranholi Moosa (18 March 1940 – 6 May 2019) was an Indian Mappilappatu and playback singer. He is considered one of the greatest and most influential Mappilappattu singers of all time. During his musical career, Moosa has performed solo in more than 1000 stages, which includes nearly 300 stages across several gulf countries and has recorded more than 100 Mappila songs. He has also played a lead role in the movie Gramophone directed by Kamal.

== Life and career ==
Moosa was born as the son of Eranholi Valiyakath Abu and Aasya and started singing at a very early age. During his early life, he used to sing for many low profile cultural organisations, notably in marriage functions. He later studied music for two years under Sarathchandra Marathe. He started his musical career with the song "Arimullappoomanam ulloole" in the 70's. It was in 1974 that he made his debut in Abu Dhabi. He rose to a popular figure after started singing to the tunes of legendary musician Raghavan Master in All India Radio. His famous songs includes Mihraj Raavile Kaatte, Misrile Raajan, Thaif Nagari, Nafsu Nafsine, and Samanin Koorirul Kaatte along with the most famous song "Manikyamalaraya Poovi". This song, which was originally composed in 1978 became one of the most listened Malayalam song in YouTube after it was recreated for the 2018 Malayalam movie Oru Adaar Love.

In 2003, he acted as an aging musician in the Malayalam film Gramophone, which shows the reality of many talented musicians struggling to make a living and aging in the narrow lanes of Mattancherry. In 2009, he received the Kerala Sangeetha Nataka Akademi Award in Mappilappattu category.

During his final years before death, Musa served as the vice chairman of the Kerala Folklore Academy. Due to age related issues, Moosa suffered from breathing problems and later died on 6 May 2019, aged 79.

== Music style and influence ==
Eranjoli Moosa played an important role in popularizing Mappila songs. He was known for his unique voice and singing style. According to some experts in Mappilappatu, it was Moosa's unique voice that gave him the recognition as one of the most popular Mappilappattu singer.
