= Sooraj Thelakkad =

Indian actor and comedian

- Born: 4 September 1995 (age 30); Thelakkad, Perinthalmanna, Malappuram, Kerala
- Years active: 2012-present
- Notable work: Android Kunjappan Version 5.25
- Parent(s): Mohanan, Jyothilakshmi

Sooraj Thelakkad is an Indian actor, comedian, impressionist and television presenter, who appears in Malayalam films and television. He came into limelight after doing the role of robot as a title character in the film Android Kunjappan Version 5.25 directed by Ratheesh Poduval. Sooraj started his career as an impressionist and comedian and has appeared in several television shows.

== Early life ==
Sooraj is the youngest child of the two children of Alikkal Mohanan, a collection agent in vanitha co-operative bank and Jyothilakshmi, a housewife. He had his primary education from Government L.P. School, Thelakkad. Sooraj completed his Graduation in B.Com St.Mary's College Puthananghadi. He started performing mimicry for the first time when he was in the 5th grade. His breakthrough came when he acted in Cinema Chirima, a comedy program which was broadcast on Mazhavil Manorama with Kalabhavan Mani and Comedy Super Nite with Suraj venjaramoodu.

== Career ==
Sooraj started his career as a stand-up comedian. His mimicry shows were a success with the audience. He first acted in a film named Charlie, which was directed by Martin Prakat.

== Filmography ==
Year	Title	Role	Notes
2015	Charlie		Debut
2017	Cappuccino		
2017	Udaharanam Sujatha	Chandu	
2017	Vimaanam		
2019	Oru Adaar Love		
2019	Ambili		
2019	Ennodu Para I Love You Ennu		
2019	Android Kunjappan Version 5.25	Android Kunjappan Version 5.25	Lead role
2020	Dhamaka	Britto's bodyguard	
2020	Nancy Raani		
2023	Jailer	Varman’s henchman	Uncredited; Tamil film
2024	Aanandhapuram Diaries		
2024	Idiyan Chandhu		
2024	Porattu Naadakam †	TBA	

== Television ==
Year	Title	Role	Channel
2012	Bhima Jewels Comedy Festival Season 1	Supporting Artist	Mazhavil manorama
2013	Bhima jewels Comedy Festival Season 2	Supporting Artist	Mazhavil manorama
2014	Comedy stars Season 2	Supporting Artist	Asianet
2015 - 2016	Comedy Super Nite	Character Entry	Flowers TV
2016 - 2017	Comedy Super Nite 2	Character Entry	Flowers TV
2017 - 2018	Comedy Super Nite 3	Character Entry	Flowers TV
2017 - 2018	Katturumbu	Character Entry	Flowers TV
2019	Thamasa Bazar	Character Entry	Zee TV
2019	Comedy Nights with Suraj	Character Entry	Zee TV
2020	Funny Nights with Pearle Maaney	Character Entry	Zee TV
2021	Udan Panam 3.0	Co- Host	Mazhavil Manorama
2022	Bigg Boss (Malayalam season 4)	Contestant; Finalist	Asianet (TV channel)
