= Merri Boys =

Upcoming Indian Malayalam-language film

- Theatrical release poster
- Directed by: Mahesh Maanas
- Screenplay by: Sreeprasad Chandran
- Story by: Mahesh Maanas
- Produced by: Listin Stephen
- Starring: Aiswarya Raj; Vishak Nair; Parvathy Ayyappadas; Keerthana Prem; Swetha Warrier; Aathira Rajeev; Shon Joy; Roshan Abdul Rahoof; Saafboi; Bindu Panicker
- Cinematography: Faiz Siddik
- Edited by: Akash Joseph Varghese
- Music by: Sam C. S.; Dawn Vincent
- Production company: Magic Frames
- Distributed by: Magic Frames Release
- Release date: December 2026
- Country: India
- Language: Malayalam

Merri Boys is an upcoming Indian Malayalam-language campus romantic drama film directed by Mahesh Maanas in his directorial debut, who also wrote the story. The screenplay and dialogues were written by Sreeprasad Chandran. It is produced by Listin Stephen under Magic Frames. The film stars Aiswarya Raj in the title role, alongside Vishak Nair, Parvathy Ayyappadas, Keerthana Prem, Swetha Warrier, Aathira Rajeev, Shon Joy, Roshan Abdul Rahoof, Saafboi and Bindu Panicker.

The film was announced in July 2025 and principal photography was completed in January 2026. The music is composed by Sam C. S. and Dawn Vincent, with cinematography by Faiz Siddik and editing by Akash Joseph Varghese. Merri Boys is scheduled to be released in December 2026.

== Cast ==
- Aiswarya Raj as Merri
- Vishak Nair
- Parvathy Ayyappadas
- Keerthana Prem
- Swetha Warrier
- Aathira Rajeev
- Shon Joy
- Roshan Abdul Rahoof
- Saafboi
- Bindu Panicker
- Ann Jameela Salim
- Sreejith Ravi
- James Eliya
- Akhil Kalavoor
- Franko Francis
- Ashwath Lal
- Moor

== Production ==
=== Development ===
Listin Stephen announced the film in July 2025, and Magic Frames released its title poster. It is the 38th production of Magic Frames. Most of the cast and several members of the crew are newcomers. Mahesh Maanas makes his debut as director with the film, and it is also the first film of screenwriter Sreeprasad Chandran. Justin Stephen is the co-producer. The film's tagline is "One heart, many hurts".

=== Filming ===
The film was launched with a puja ceremony held at the Chavara Cultural Centre in Kochi in October 2025. Producer Abraham Mathew switched on the camera and Antony Perumbavoor gave the first clap. A schedule was completed in November 2025. Filming took place in Muvattupuzha, Puthenkurish and Kochi, and the final schedule was completed in January 2026.

== Music ==
The film's music is composed by Sam C. S. and Dawn Vincent.

== Release ==
Merri Boys is scheduled to be released in theatres in December 2026.

=== Marketing ===
The first look poster was released in October 2025. A New Year poster featuring Aiswarya Raj, Keerthana Prem, Swetha Warrier and Parvathy Ayyappadas was released on 31 December 2025. The character poster of Aiswarya Raj as Merri was released on 24 July 2026. The song "Merri Jaani" was released as a single in November 2026.
