= LLB (disambiguation) =

The LLB, or Bachelor of Laws, is an undergraduate degree offered in most common law countries.

LLB may also refer to:

- L.L. Bean, an outdoors equipment manufacturer
- Lac La Biche, Alberta
- Laurence Llewelyn-Bowen, British interior designer and TV personality
- Lemon, lime and bitters, a mixed drink common in Australia and New Zealand
- Libo Airport, IATA code LLB
- Liechtensteinische Landesbank, a bank in Liechtenstein, trades as LLB
- Little League Baseball, a youth sports organization in the United States
- Low-Level Bootloader, a component of the startup process for Apple devices
- LLB: Life Line of Bachelors, a 2024 Indian film
