= Aanandhapuram Diaries =

2024 Indian drama film

- Theatrical release poster
- Directed by: Jaya Jose Raj
- Screenplay by: Jaya Jose Raj
- Story by: Sasi Gopalan Nair
- Dialogues by: Jaya Jose Raj
- Produced by: Sasi Gopalan Nair
- Starring: Meena
- Cinematography: Sajith Purushan
- Edited by: Appu Bhattathiri; Shaijas K. M.
- Music by: Shaan Rahman; Albert Vijayan; Jackson Vijayan
- Production company: Neil Productions
- Release date: 1 March 2024
- Country: India
- Language: Malayalam

Aanandhapuram Diaries is a 2024 Indian Malayalam-language drama film written and directed by Jaya Jose Raj. The film stars Meena alongside Srikanth, Roshan Abdul Rahoof, Maala Parvathi, and Manoj K. Jayan in pivotal roles.

== Plot ==
After facing rough times in life, Nandini, a resilient and tough woman returns to Law College to finish her education. She finds solace in new friendships. Unknowingly she gets into dangerous conflicts that threaten the social fabric of society.

== Cast ==
- Meena as Nandini
- Srikanth as Professor Paul Durairaj
- Manoj K. Jayan as Advocate Easwar
- Roshan Abdul Rahoof as Adithyan
- Shikha Santhosh as Rebecca
- Abhishek Udayakumar as Hari
- Siddharth Siva as Professor Veerendren
- Jaffar Idukki as Usman
- Sudheer Karamana as Judge Azees
- Maala Parvathi as Special public prosecutor
- Remya Suresh as Malini's mother
- Sooraj Thelakkad as Sajju
- Sanjana Sajan as Malini
- Murali Vidhyadharan as Principal

== Production ==
The film was announced in September 2023, with filming already underway in Kalpetta. On 26 October 2023, it was reported that the filming had been completed in Kozhikode. The film is directed by Jaya Jose Raj, who made his feature film debut with Idam (2019). The story of the film is written by Sasi Gopalan Nair, who also produced the film under the banner Neil Productions.

== Soundtrack ==
Aanandhapuram Diaries

Soundtrack album by Shaan Rahman, Albert Vijayan, Jackson Vijayan Score: Rahul Raj
- Released: 2024
- Genre: Feature film soundtrack
- Length: 23:17
- Language: Malayalam
- Label: Manorama Music
External audio
- Aanandhapuram Diaries – Jukebox on YouTube

The songs were composed by Shaan Rahman, Albert Vijayan, and Jackson Vijayan.

Track listing
No.	Title	Lyrics	Music	Singer(s)	Length
1.	"Aaru Nee Kanmani"	Rafeeq Ahammed	Albert Vijayan	K. S. Chithra	4:35
2.	"Ankam Vettan Munnil"	Manu Manjith	Shaan Rahman	Yazin Nizar, Mithun Jayaraj	3:01
3.	"Innee Jeevitham"	Sinan Abraham	Jackson Vijayan	Jackson Vijayan	3:14
4.	"Kannilooorumoru Neermani"	Manu Manjith	Shaan Rahman	Sooraj Santhosh	2:39
5.	"Panchami Raavil Pothinkal"	Manu Manjith	Shaan Rahman	Sujatha, Sooraj Santhosh	3:36
6.	"Pottuthottorungi Ninnu"	Manu Manjith, Suresh Mathew (Choottu)	Shaan Rahman & Suresh Mathew (Choottu)	Sujatha, Sooraj Santhosh	3:19
7.	"Sathyameva Jayathe"	Manu Manjith	Shaan Rahman	Rani Sajeev, Dakshina Indu Mithun, Ashwin Vijay, Sreejith Subramanian	2:53
Total length:					23:17

== Release ==
Aanandhapuram Diaries was released theatrically on 1 March 2024.

=== Home media ===
The digital streaming rights were acquired by ManoramaMAX and the film began streaming on the platform from 4 October 2024. The satellite rights of the film is owned by Flowers TV.

== Reception ==
A critic from Times Now rated the film three out of five stars and wrote, "A Heartwarming Tale Of A Woman's Determination And Resilience". Princy Alexander of Onmanorama wrote, "While the filmmaker deserves praise for discussing a social menace, it seemed a bit forced. Also, the film struggles to stay focused on one theme."
