= Swetha Ashok =

Indian playback singer

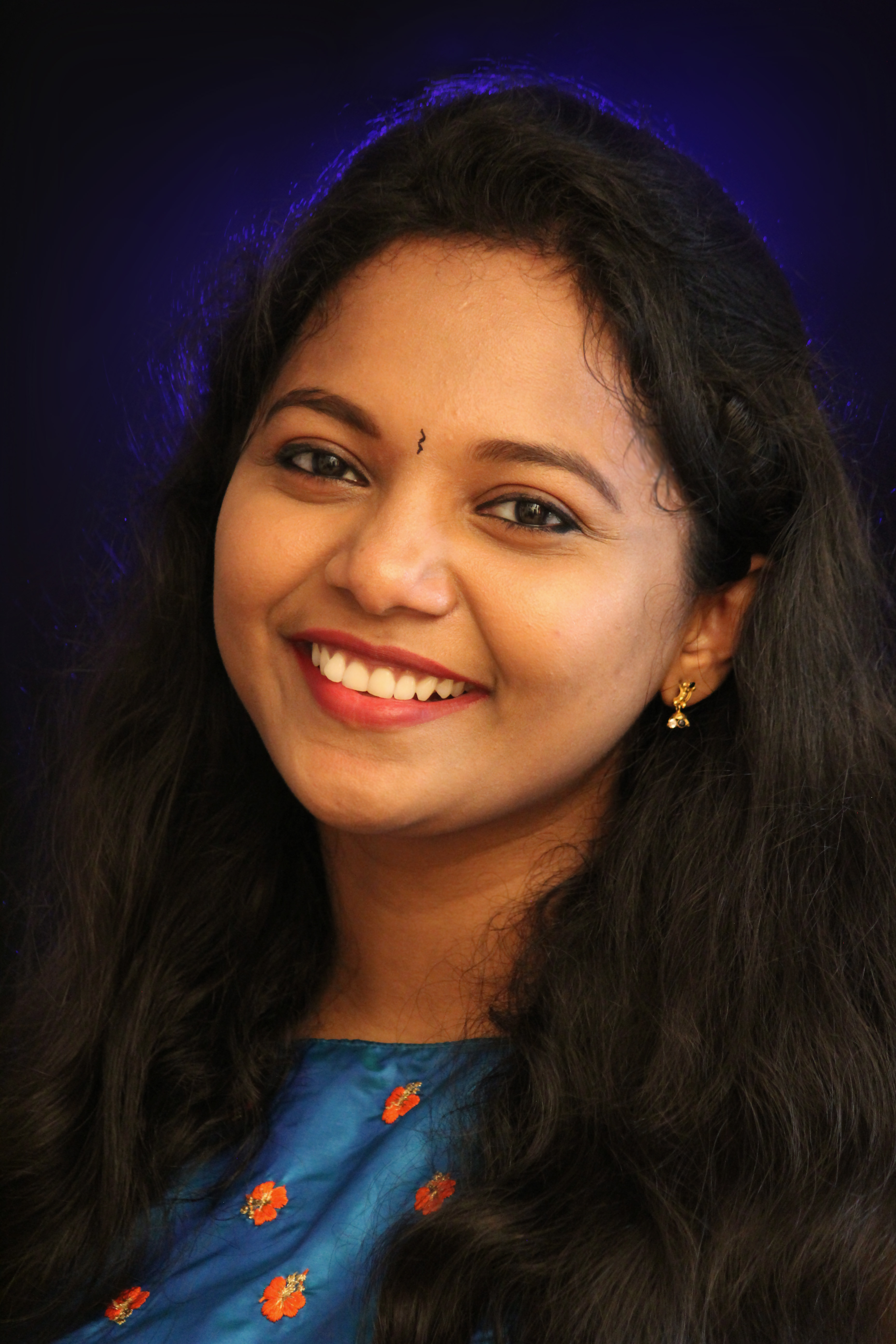

Background information
- Born: Vadakara, Calicut, Kerala
- Genres: Folk, Indian classical, Playback Singing, Ghazal, Western
- Years active: 2008 – present

Swetha Ashok is an Indian playback singer, who is well known for her work in the Malayalam film industry. She rose to fame as a child when she won the reality show Munch Star Singer (2008). She was one of the finalists on the reality show SaReGaMaPa Keralam, the Malayalam regional version of the flagship show of Zee Entertainment Enterprises. During the course of the show, Swetha launched her playback singing career by singing songs for prominent films like Mammooty's Shylock, Happy Sardar, and Dhamaka by music director Gopi Sundar.

== Biography ==
Swetha was born in Vadakara, Calicut. She currently lives with her parents and brother in Cochin, Kerala. She has one elder sister and a brother. Swetha's brother Vishnu Ashok is an aspiring violinist and a music director. Swetha's sister Aswathi Ashok is a lyricist and a businesswoman, owner of the jewellery line AASH.

== Career ==
Swetha is a trained classical singer and a B high grade artiste in All India Radio. She trained under Guru T. Ramachandran Namboothiri and Guru Vaikom Jayachandran Namboothiri. She participated in the reality show Munch Star Singer in 2008 and subsequently was crowned the winner. Post her rise to fame as a child, Swetha has done over 500 concerts across India, USA, Canada, Singapore and the Middle East. She was an Asst. Professor of Computer Science and an online music instructor at NotesNBeats, California before she once again participated in a reality show SaReGaMaPa Keralam in 2019. During the course of her show, she landed singing opportunities with well known music directors like Gopi Sundar and Shaan Rahman.

On 26 August 2020, Swetha released her first original song, called "Chingaponpulari". The song is an Onam special featuring Swetha as the artiste. The music was done by her brother Vishnu Ashok and the lyrics have been penned by her sister Aswathi Ashok. The song immediately trended after the release with multiple media platforms covering it and lauding the family for their joint venture. Produced under their family's banner, the song has been jointly produced by KP Ashokan and Jyothi Ashok. The song was released online by Sujatha Mohan who appreciated Swetha on her maiden original with a note of encouragement.

Swetha released her second single on 1 November 2020. The romantic number "Neeye" was the second venture of the sibling trio with Vishnu Ashok composing the music and Aswathi Ashok penning the lyrics for the same.

== As playback singer ==
- All songs are in Malayalam, unless otherwise noted.

Year	Song	Title	Music director	Notes
2010	"Amme Mookambike"	Nalla Pattukare	Sharreth	
2017	"Kannil Mayyezhuthi"	Sakhavinte Priyasakhi	Hari	
2019	"Bar Song"	Shylock	Gopi Sundar	
2019	"Adipoli Dhamaka"	Dhamaka	Gopi Sundar	
2019	"Happy Song"	Dhamaka	Gopi Sundar	
2020	"Farewell Song - Chorus"	Kunjeldho	Shaan Rahman	
2020	"Thulasikathir Nulliyeduthu"	Album	Sargam Music	
2020	"Maadu Meykum Kanne"	Album	Sargam Music	
2020	"Veera Viraada"	Album	Sargam Music	
2020	"Malappuram Song"	Album	Atif, Essar Media	
2020	"Thulasi Kathir" (Hindi)	Album	Sargam Music	
2020	"Chingaponpulari"	Original song	Vishnu Ashok	
2020	"Neeye"	Original song	Vishnu Ashok	
2020	"Kadhayini Maari"	Kaiyethum Doorath	Gopi Sundar	
2021	"Janmangal Theeruvolam Amma Kunje"	Amma makal	Alphons Joseph	
2021	"Edukka Kaashayi"	Minnal Murali	Shaan Rahman	
2022	"Nagumo Revival"	Hridayam	Hesham Abdul Wahab	
2022	"Paalvarnna Kuthiramel"	Kaduva	Jakes Bejoy	
2022	"Theliyaledhuga"	Em Chesthunnav	Gopi Sundar	
2023	"Parakkum Parava Poley"	Otta	M. Jayachandran	
2024	"Usure Usure"	Amaran	G.V. Prakash Kumar	Telugu (Dubbed)
2024	"Usure Usure"	Amaran	G.V. Prakash Kumar	Kannada (Dubbed)
2024	"Maan Re"	Amaran	G.V. Prakash Kumar	Hindi (Dubbed)
2024	"Uyire Uyire"	Amaran	G.V. Prakash Kumar	Malayalam (Dubbed)
2024	"Vennilavu Saaral"	Amaran	G.V. Prakash Kumar	Tamil (Backup Chorus)

== Television shows ==
Program	Role	Channel	Notes
Star Singer season 10	Mentor	Asianet	
Star Singer season 9	Mentor	Asianet	
Sa Re Ga Ma Pa Keralam	Contestant	Zee Keralam	2nd Runner-Up
Munch Star Singer season 1	Contestant	Asianet	Winner
