= Matchbox (2017 film) =

- Directed by: Sivaram Mony
- Written by: Nikhil Anand; Kenny Peruzzi
- Produced by: Revathy Kalamandhir
- Starring: Roshan Mathew; Vishak Nair; Drishya Raghunath; Joe John Chacko; Mathew Joy Mathew; Jibin Ponnachan; Rony David Raj; Shammi Tilakan; Ashokan (actor); Sharath; Sai Krishna; Sudeep; Kartika Kannan; Srinidhi Ganguly
- Cinematography: Udayan Ambaadi
- Edited by: Raj Kumar
- Music by: Bijibal
- Release date: 15 September 2017
- Country: India
- Language: Malayalam

Matchbox is a 2017 Indian Malayalam-language romantic comedy film written by Nikhil Anand and Kenny Peruzzi and directed by Sivaram Mony. Starring Roshan Mathew, Vishak Nair, and Drishya Raghunath. The film was produced by Revathy Kalamandhir. It is the debut film of Sivaram Mony. The film was released on 15 September 2017.

== Plot ==
Ambu, a carefree college student falls in love with Nidhi, a girl he sees at a bus stop. He finds out that her father is a friend of his own father and tries to convey his feelings to her. However, by the time he could profess his feelings, things go awry.

== Cast ==
- Roshan Mathew as Ernesto Narendran aka Ambu
- Vishak Nair as Ashok Raj aka Pandi
- Drishya Raghunath as Nidhi

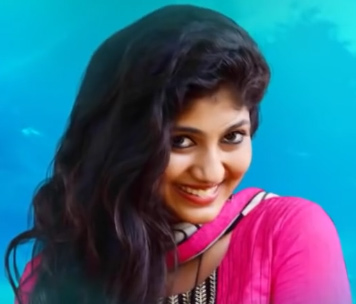
Drishya Raghunath in the film

- Joe John Chacko
- Mathew Joy Mathew
- Rony David as Vijay Babu
- Mruthul T. Viswanath
- Shammi Thilakan as Sakhavu Narendran
- Ashokan as Vinod, Nidhi's father
- Sharath as Fidel Narendran aka Appu
- Sai Krishna as Kishore
- Sudeep
- Karthika Kannan as Nidhi's mother
- Srinidhi Ganguly
- Valsala Menon
- Fahim Safar
- Jayadeep. V. Nair as Raju
- Sivaram Mony as Sathyan
- Hari Ambro as Arjun

== Production ==
According to director Sivaram Mony, Matchbox is a coming-of-age story containing love, friendship and fun. It was shot in Kozhikode. "Matchbox, as the name suggests, is about how a few people fit perfectly in a box, or a society. Though there are four main characters in the movie, Matchbox is mainly about Ambu," says Sivaram. The film is about four friends and the strong bond they share. "While we paid tribute to the city through the movie, Kozhikode and its unique slang helped us a lot in establishing the depth of friendship the characters share," says Sivaram. Matchbox was produced under the banner of Revathy Kalamandir.

== Music ==
#	Song	Singer(s)	Lyrics	Music
1	"Aradhyam Thooki Punjiri"	Vishnu Kurup, Shilpa Raju	Rafeeq Ahamed	Bijibal
2	"Orayiram"	Najim Arshad	Rafeeq Ahamed	Bijibal
3	"Kettumarannoru"	Anitha Shaiq	Rafeeq Ahamed	Bijibal
4	"Chuvadukal"	Afsal	Rafeeq Ahamed	Bijibal

== Reception ==
A critic from The New Indian Express wrote that "Matchbox is a good one-time watch".
