= Vimala College =

Women's college in Thrissur, Kerala, India

Coordinates: 10.5528°N 76.2266°E

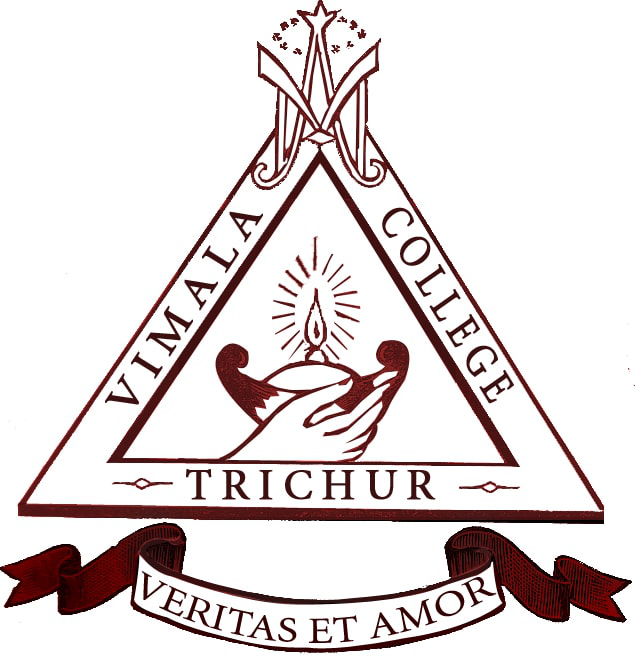
- Motto in English: Truth and Love
- Established: 1967
- Affiliations: University of Calicut
- Principal: Dr.Sr. Beena Jose
- Students: 2,047
- Location: Thrissur, Kerala, India
- Campus: Urban
- Website: http://www.vimalacollege.edu.in

Vimala College is a Women's college in Thrissur City of Kerala state, India. It was established in 1967 after bifurcating St. Mary's College, Thrissur. The college is under the management of the Nirmala Province, Thrissur, of The Congregation of Mother of Carmel in the Syro-Malabar Catholic Church.

The college is under the religious jurisdiction of the Syro-Malabar Catholic Archdiocese of Thrissur and is one of the leading educational institutions related to or run by church organizations. Vimala College was the only women's college in Kerala which offered exclusively graduate and post-graduate programmes. The college was presented the R Shankar Award in 2002 by the Government of Kerala. It has been re-accredited with an A grade at 3.3 CGPA in a four-point scale in 2008 by the National Assessment and Accreditation Council, Bangalore. The college is ranked 80th among colleges in India by the National Institutional Ranking Framework (NIRF) in 2024.

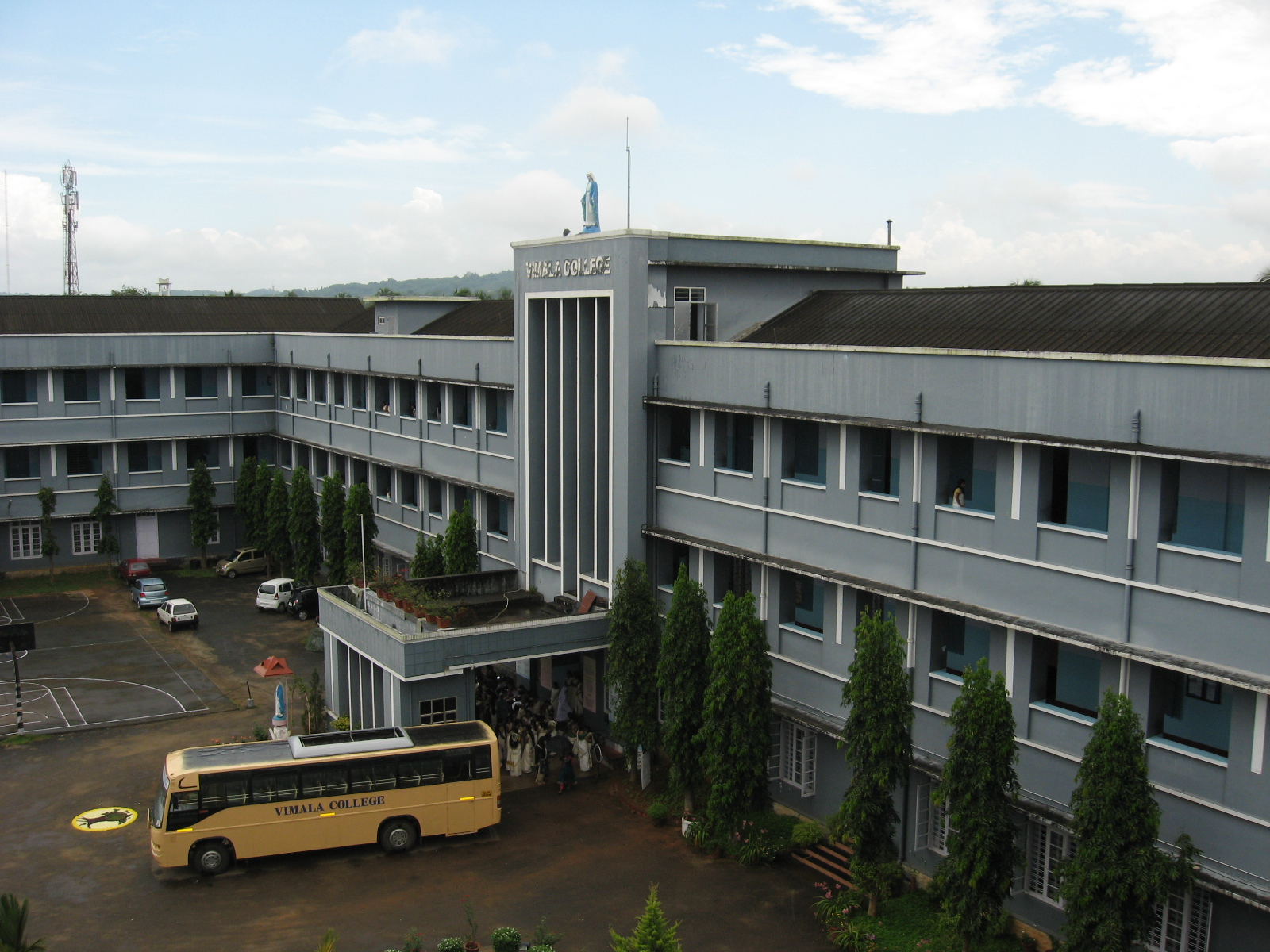
Main Block of Vimala College

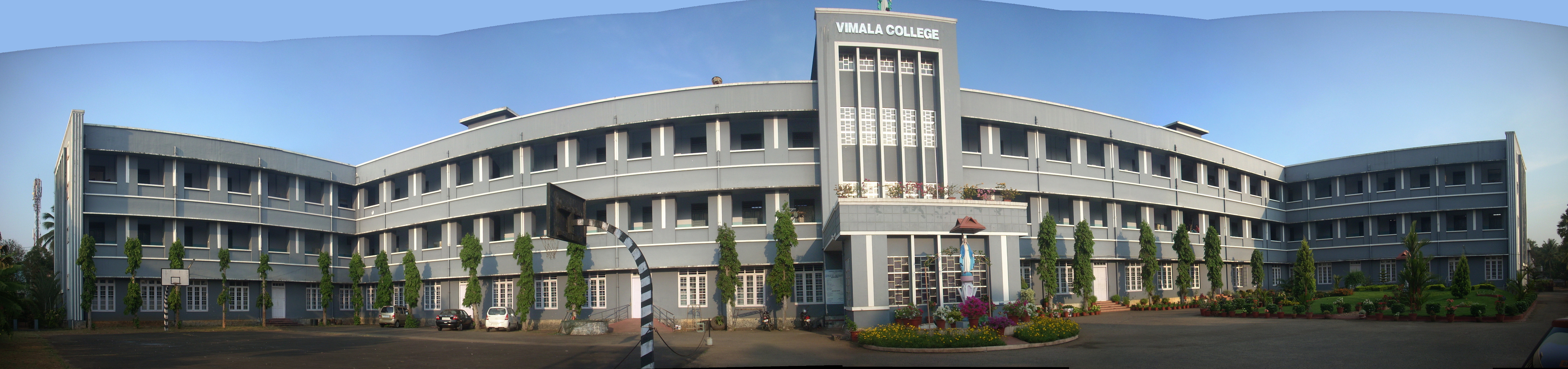
Panorama of Main building of Vimala College, Thrissur City.

== Notable alumni ==
- Bobby Aloysius, Olympian
- Priya Prakash Varrier, Actress
- Gayatri Asokan, singer
- Anju Bobby George, national athlete
- Gayathri Suresh, Actress
- Oviya, Actress

== See also ==
- St. Joseph's College, Irinjalakuda
- Christ College, Irinjalakuda
- St. Thomas College, Thrissur
- University of Calicut
