= Gramophone (film) =

Malayalam movie

- Directed by: Kamal
- Screenplay by: Iqbal Kuttippuram
- Story by: Kamal
- Produced by: Sargam Kabeer
- Starring: Dileep; Meera Jasmine; Navya Nair; Janardhanan; Oduvil Unnikrishnan
- Cinematography: P. Sukumar
- Edited by: K. Rajagopal
- Music by: Vidyasagar
- Production company: Sargam Speed Productions
- Release date: 4 July 2003
- Country: India
- Language: Malayalam

Gramophone is a 2003 Indian Malayalam-language musical drama film directed by Kamal and written by Iqbal Kuttippuram, starring Dileep, Meera Jasmine and Navya Nair. The music was composed by Vidyasagar. It was a moderate success at the box office.

The film was originally released with a bittersweet ending, which was later changed to a happy ending in order to improve its commercial appeal.

== Plot ==
Sachidanandan, is a very hard working person. He runs an antique shop, with his father's close friend, Pattu Settu, but has many side businesses as well and is a man of principles. He is the son of famous singer Ravindranath, who was unsuccessful in his career, as he was cheated by one of his students named Arya Devi, who became a successful singer by plagiarizing Ravindranath's composition. Hence Ravindranath's close friends Pattu Settu, Saigal Yousuf and Tabla Bhaskaran consider Arya Devi as the cause for his failure in his career. But, Sachi hates singing, as he believe his father's singing profession left him with huge debts. So, he always refuses to unleash his singing talents. He has a greedy mother, a greedy brother and an innocent sister.

His childhood friend, Jennifer, also a hardworking Jewish girl, works in a hotel as a cleaner, likes his personality and loves him, but her grandfather, Gregorious Gregory, and her whole family, other than Sara, Gregory's daughter, dislikes him and his father. When their family got the chance to immigrate to Israel through the Law of Return, in condition to marry someone from Israel, was shattered when Sara falls in love with Ravindranath. Same kind of proposal was received by Jennifer, to marry Isahakh. So, he also doesn't want to repeat the same history of Jennifer loving Sachi. And for that sake, he always try to keep Jennifer away from Sachi.

When she got such a proposal to marry Isahakh, she accepted for marriage, as she wants to keep her family happy. Meanwhile, Pooja, the daughter of Arya Devi, along with Arya Devi and Arya Devi's Secretary, Mathachayan, lands at Kochi, to solve some property issues caused by her children. They coincidentally check-in in the same hotel, in which Jenni works. Arya Devi helps all those whom she hurt, including Sachi's family, by giving ₹10,000. In anger by her this act, he returns all those ₹10,000. This makes Pooja to respect and love Sachi.

While cleaning Arya Devi's room, Jenni finds a beautiful dress, and she mistakenly wears it, and was caught red handed, but left without anything. This marks Jenni's introduction to Pooja, and soon these two girls become very close friends.

Arya Devi and her family, who were leading a luxurious life, fell into debt and had not enough money to pay the hotel, and had started living in rent in a small house. Knowing of this, Sachi decides to clear off their debts, by taking loan himself and paying the hotel rent. This made Pooja's love stronger.

At the same time, Jenni too wanted to handover Sachi to someone like herself, as she knew she had to leave him in a few days. So she decided to set Pooja for Sachi. But Sachi was completely against it, as he didn't want to keep any relationship with Arya Devi.

Pooja started working with Jenni to clear off debts, and coincidentally sees her childhood friend, who was too a singer, and told him about Sachi's talent of singing. When Sachi got to know about this, though he disagreed at first, but agreed at last, and a bunch of albums were sent to Pooja's friend. But her friend cheated everyone, by translating the song into Hindi, and publishing it. Then Pooja reveals that she didn't know about it, and was a conspiracy by her mother, and asked for sorry on behalf of her mother, and decided to stay back in Kerala.

At the same time, countdown had started for Jenni to go back Israel. At that time, Sara wishes to meet her lover's son, Sachi, and he completes her wish. And after that, she dies. After her death, Gregory confesses that Isahakh had already informed Gregory that he hadn't taken the ticket for Sara, as everyone used to consider Sara a cheater. And finally, it's the day to depart. Sachi and Jenni share a tearful goodbye, whilst realizing the depth of their love for each other.

Original Climax

In the original ending, a distraught Sachi is consoled by his father's friends. Pooja and Pattu Settu ask Sachi to follow his passion for singing, saying that he will become a better musician than his father. With the support of his well wishers, Sachi takes the first steps to become a great musician, with the simple hope that he may reunite with Jenni someday.

Changed Climax

In the changed ending, Sachi is sitting by the sea, distraught over Jenni leaving, when his friend Lalappan informs that Jenni and her family returned. It is revealed that Isahakh intended to take only Jenni back to Israel, planning to abandon everyone else at the airport. They caught his ruse, beat him up and returned, while also calling off his wedding to Jenni. Gregory apologizes to Sachi and accepts his and Jenni's love, while abandoning his desire to return to Israel. Sachi and Jenni have an emotional reunion, their love finally triumphing over everything.

== Cast ==
- Dileep as Sachidanandan
- Meera Jasmine as Jennifer
- Navya Nair as Pooja
- Revathi as Sara
- Oduvil Unnikrishnan as Pattu Settu
- Murali as Ravindranathan. Sachidanadhan's father
- Salim Kumar as Tabla Bhaskaran
- Janardhanan as Gregorious Gregory
- Bindu Panicker as Sachi's mother
- Geetha Salam as Saigal Yusef
- Remya Nambeesan as Sachi's sister
- T. P. Madhavan as Mathachayan
- Subbalakshmi as Gregory's wife
- Piyush Soni as Nithin (voiceover by Mithun Ramesh)
- Shafi Qureshi as Isahakh (voiceover by Mithun Ramesh)
- Eranjoli Moosa as Louis
- Vijeesh Vijayan as Sarathchandran Das. Sachidanadhan's younger brother
- Niyas Backer as Lalappan
- Poornima Anand as Arya Devi
- Kalabhavan Haneef as union leader
- Jijoy Rajagopal as Documentary director

== Soundtrack ==
The film's soundtrack contains 6 songs, all composed by Vidyasagar. Lyrics were by Girish Puthenchery, Piyush Soni and Sachidhanandan Puzhankara.

#	Title	Singer(s)
1	"Enthe Innum Vanneela"	P. Jayachandran, Jeemon KJ, Chorus
2	"I Remember"	Pop Shalini
3	"Ninakkente"	Dr. K. J. Yesudas, Sujatha Mohan
4	"Oru Poomazha"	Dr. K. J. Yesudas
5	"Paikkurumbiye Meykkum"	Balram, Sujatha Mohan, Chorus
6	"Vilichathenthinu"	Dr. K. J. Yesudas
7	"Meri Zindagi Mein Tu Pehla Pyar"	Piyush Soni
