= Otta (film) =

2023 Malayalam film by Resul Pookutty

- Theatrical release poster
- Directed by: Resul Pookutty
- Written by: Kiron Prabhakaran
- Based on: Runaway Children by Hariharan S.
- Produced by: Resul Pookutty; Hariharan S.
- Starring: Asif Ali; Indrajith Sukumaran; Arjun Ashokan
- Cinematography: Arun Varma
- Edited by: Zian Sreekanth
- Music by: M. Jayachandran
- Production companies: Children Reunited LLP; Resul Pookutty Productions
- Distributed by: Century Films
- Release date: 27 October 2023
- Running time: 147 minutes
- Country: India
- Language: Malayalam

Otta (also known as Otta: The Loner) is a 2023 Indian Malayalam-language drama thriller film directed by Resul Pookutty (in his directorial debut), based on S. Hariharan's book, Runaway Children. The film stars Asif Ali, Indrajith Sukumaran, and Arjun Ashokan in the lead roles, alongside an ensemble supporting cast. The story follows two friends, Hari and Ben, who abandon their homes due to family problems.

The film was officially announced in April 2022 in Kochi, and principal photography began in the same month. The music was composed by M. Jayachandran, while the cinematography and editing were handled by Arun Varma and Zian Sreekanth, respectively.

Otta was released in theatres on 27 October 2023. The film received mixed to negative reviews from critics.

== Cast ==
- Asif Ali as Hari alias Hariharan
- Indrajith Sukumaran as Raju
- Arjun Ashokan as Ben
- Sathyaraj as Iyer, Hari's father
- Adil Hussain
- Indrans
- Renji Panicker
- Jayaprakash
- Jayakrishnan
- Baiju Pookutty
- Rohini as Umabba, Hari's mother
- Bhavana Ramanna (Nandini Ramanna) as Dr. Mary Thomas, Ben's mother
- Devi Nair
- Divya Dutta
- Mamta Mohandas
- Lena
- Shyamaprasad

== Production ==
=== Development ===
Otta marks the directorial debut of Resul Pookutty. In an interview with Film Companion, Resul said that he planned to make his directorial debut with a Hindi film with Rajinikanth, however, his debut film eventually became Otta, which he wanted to initially produce, but later decided to direct by himself. The film's script is written by Kiron Prabhakar, based on a book titled Runaway Children by S. Hariharan, a social worker.

The film, along with Resul Pookutty's production company, Resul Pookutty Productions, was officially announced on 13 April 2022 at the Crowne Plaza hotel in Kochi. S. Hariharan's Children Reunited LLP co-produced the film with Resul Pookutty Productions. Arun Varma and Zian Sreekanth were recruited as the cinematographer and editor, respectively.

=== Casting ===
In an interview with an online media in April 2022, Resul Pookutty said that his film will have Shobana, Asif Ali, Indrans, Arjun Ashokan, Sathyaraj, Rohini, Shyamaprasad, Renji Panicker, Adil Hussain, and Divya Dutta appearing in prominent roles. Shobana, who was taking a break after her previous film, Varane Avashyamund (2020), was approached to play a role, which she agreed to after hearing the story. Adil Hussain was chosen to play the role of a policeman. Resul Pookutty approached Divya Dutta to play the role of a Punjabi. The film also marks her debut in a Malayalam film. Devi Nair, daughter of actress Jalaja, was cast to play an important role. Resul Pookutty's brother, Baiju Pookutty, was also included in the cast.

=== Filming ===
The crew began principal photography on 25 April 2022. Initial filming took place at a Nālukettu in Kannankulangara, near North Paravur. On the fourth day of the shoot, Resul Pookutty was admitted to the hospital for 45 days after suffering from dengue. In Chennai, a kilometer-long stretch was used to build a set to recreate the looks of the 1990s and the period scenes were shot with cameras from the era. Filming was also done with still cameras and iPhones.

== Music ==
Otta

Soundtrack album by M. Jayachandran
- Released: 2023
- Venues: Kochi, Mumbai, Chennai
- Studios: My Studio; Aaravind Audio Garage; Yashraj Studios; AM Studios; Sound Town
- Genre: Feature film soundtrack
- Length: 21:39
- Languages: Malayalam, Tamil
- Label: Children Reunited LLP

M. Jayachandran chronology
Njanum Pinnoru Njanum (2023)	Otta (2023)

The film's soundtrack album consists of five songs composed by M. Jayachandran, while the lyrics are written by Rafeeq Ahamed and Vairamuthu. The vocals are given by Shankar Mahadevan, Shreya Ghoshal, P. Jayachandran, Jassie Gift, Alphons Joseph and Benny Dayal. On 24 October 2023, the first song "Peyneer Poley" was released.

Otta (Original Motion Picture Soundtrack)
No.	Title	Lyrics	Singer(s)	Length
1.	"En Kaadal Nadiye" (Tamil)	Vairamuthu	Shankar Mahadevan, Shreya Ghoshal, Sreeraj Sahajan	3:51
2.	"Parakkum Parava Poley"	Rafeeq Ahamed	Jassie Gift, Alphons Joseph, Yazin Nizar Malathy, Swetha Ashok	3:49
3.	"Peyneer Poley"	Rafeeq Ahamed	Shreya Ghoshal, Benny Dayal	3:49
4.	"Peyneer Poley" (Male vocals)	Rafeeq Ahamed	P. Jayachandran, Benny Dayal	3:49
5.	"Paral"	Rafeeq Ahamed	Benny Dayal, Unni Elayaraja, M. Jayachandran	3:34
6.	"Ottaykkoru Mutham"	Rafeeq Ahamed	Lekshmi Jayan	2:47

== Release ==
=== Theatrical ===
The film was initially scheduled to release on 15 September 2023 and later postponed due to unfinished post-production work. The film was released in theatres on 27 October 2023. It was distributed in Kerala by Century Films.

== Reception ==
=== Box office ===
The film grossed US$2,489 in the United Kingdom and US$6,929 in the United Arab Emirates, bringing its total international earnings to US$9,418.

=== Critical response ===
S. R. Praveen of The Hindu wrote "Despite an ensemble cast, only some of them get characters having enough to do to even register in our minds in Asif Ali and Arjun Ashokan's 'Otta'." Anandu Suresh of The Indian Express gave 1 out of 5 stars and wrote "Otta demonstrates that even with a team of brilliant technicians and actors, a film is destined to collapse without a strong foundation comprising a well-developed story and script." Cris of The News Minute gave 2 out of 5 stars and wrote "It is not that Otta is not relatable. Resul has tried to give a faithful account of Hariharan's story, depicted the realities that a runaway can end up in, and kept the flow. Only, the superficial treatment has weakened the effort."

Subhash K. Jha of Times Now gave 4.5 out of 5 stars and wrote "This is not the place for sidelining the fringe people in our society. Otta celebrates the have-nots without patronizing them. It is a superbly paced drama that deals a resounding blow in our guts. Arun Verma's enriching cinematography, Zian Sreekanth's seamless editing, and Cyril Kurivila's invisible art direction make this the film of the year and one you won't forget for a very long time." Sajin Shrijith of Cinema Express gave 3.5 out of 5 stars and wrote "Otta may not make you feel good, but in this age when we have to make appointments to meet our loved ones, perhaps a film like this is needed to give one the necessary jolt." Swathi P. Ajith of Onmanorama wrote "'Otta' is undeniably a fantastic movie, aside from the occasional slow moments. It's guaranteed to take the audience on an emotional rollercoaster, with many scenes that are truly heart-wrenching."
