= Check (film) =

2021 film by Chandra Sekhar Yeleti

- Theatrical release poster
- Directed by: Chandra Sekhar Yeleti
- Written by: Chandra Sekhar Yeleti
- Produced by: V. Anand Prasad
- Starring: Nithiin; Rakul Preet Singh; Priya Prakash Varrier; Simran Choudhary
- Cinematography: Rahul Shrivatsav
- Edited by: Sanal Anirudhan
- Music by: Kalyani Malik
- Production company: Bhavya Creations
- Release date: 26 February 2021
- Running time: 138 minutes
- Country: India
- Language: Telugu
- Box office: est. ₹14 crore (3 days)

Check is a 2021 Indian Telugu-language crime drama film written and directed by Chandra Sekhar Yeleti. Produced by V. Anand Prasad's Bhavya Creations, the film stars Nithiin, Rakul Preet Singh, Priya Prakash Varrier (in her Telugu film debut), and Simran Choudhary. Nithiin plays Aditya, a chess player who is on death row. The film was released on 26 February 2021. It received generally mixed reviews and became a flop in the box office.

== Plot ==
A bomb blast in Hyderabad kills 40 people. Five terrorists are arrested, found guilty, and sentenced to death. Among them is Aditya (Nithin), who continues to deny any involvement and files an appeal. While in jail awaiting the verdict, Aditya befriends an elderly inmate, Srimannarayana aka Narayan ( Sai Chand), a passionate chess player. Aditya quickly learns the game from him and proves to be exceptionally talented.

Aditya's case is taken up by lawyer Manasa (Rakul Preet Singh), who visits him in prison. Aditya tells her his story. He was an orphan raised by a travelling circus performing magic shows. As an adult, he became a petty con artist involved in white-collar scams. He later fell in love with Yatra (Priya Prakash Varrier). After a vacation together, Yatra mysteriously disappeared. Aditya was soon arrested when police found emails related to the Hyderabad blast on his laptop. He insists he is innocent: at the time the emails were sent, he was in another city with Yatra, who could provide an alibi, but she had vanished.

Believing him, Manasa brings the case to court. The judge grants Aditya six months to locate Yatra. What Aditya does not reveal to Manasa or the judge is the truth he has secretly realised: Yatra herself was one of the terrorists and deliberately framed him, so she will never testify.

Meanwhile, Aditya defeats a young chess player named Pooja, a youth champion, during a game outside the courtroom. This shocks Narayan, who becomes convinced that Aditya has the potential to become a professional player.

Narayan is eventually released. At Aditya's request, he contacts Varna, Aditya's former crime partner, and persuades her to pretend to be Yatra in court. Varna agrees, but Manasa discovers the deception and withdraws the appeal, making Aditya's death sentence final. Now Aditya's last hope is a presidential pardon. He decides to earn it by proving his extraordinary chess talent.

With Narayan's help, Aditya is allowed to participate in a major chess championship, which he wins. A convicted terrorist winning a professional tournament becomes major news. Seizing the moment, Aditya publicly proclaims his innocence and donates his prize money to build a sports stadium in the prison. Public sympathy grows, and he wins another national title, increasing support for his pardon.

However, after another terrorist attack occurs, public sentiment sharply turns against him, and the president officially rejects his clemency request. Manasa then informs him of another blow: Yatra, whose real name is Isabel, has been killed in a police encounter. Devastated, Aditya awaits execution.

On the day of his hanging, Aditya requests one final wish: to participate in the World Chess Championship, held in the very stadium built with his donation. During the match, he asks to use the restroom and vanishes. The police search desperately but cannot locate him.

In the final reveal, it is shown that the stadium was constructed by Aditya's childhood friend Swami, who secretly built a hidden escape tunnel. Inside the bathroom, Aditya used the magic tricks he learned in the circus to create a diversion with smoke and escaped through the tunnel, disappearing without a trace.

== Cast ==
- Nithin as Aditya
- Rakul Preet Singh as Manasa
- Priya Prakash Varrier as Yatra, whose real name is Isabel
- Simran Choudhary as Varna, the fake witness
- Sampath Raj as SP Rathnam
- Sai Chand as Srimannarayana
- Posani Krishna Murali as Lawyer Ramakrishna, Manasa's father
- Murali Sharma as SP Karunakar
- Aadukalam Naren as Padmanabha Simha
- Harsha Vardhan as an astrologer
- Pradeep Kondiparthi as a home minister
- Krishna Teja as Swami, Aditya's childhood friend
- Chaitanya Krishna as Ram, a Chess Champion
- Karthik Rathnam as Vikram
- Satya as Raju
- Praveen Yandamuri as Vedha
- Raina Rao as Poojitha, State level chess player
- Aziz Naser as Jailguard Katamayya

== Production ==
The film was officially announced on 23 June 2019. Although principal photography began in early 2020, filming was paused due to COVID-19 lockdown in India. Filming was resumed in October 2020. The film's title was announced on 1 October 2020.

== Soundtrack ==
This film's soundtrack is composed by Kalyani Malik, marking his second collaboration with Yeleti after Aithe (2003).

The film's only song is "Ninnu Chudakunda Undalekapothunnanu", sung by Haricharan and Shakthisree Gopalan.

== Release ==
Check was released theatrically on 26 February 2021. It was later released in Streaming media via Sun NXT on 14 May 2021.

The film's Hindi dubbed version premiered on Sony Max on 9 January 2022 and was available on SonyLIV later released on YouTube by Aditya Movies on 25 January 2022.

== Reception ==
=== Critical reception ===
Check opened to mixed reviews. The Times of India critic Neeshita Nyayapati rated the film 2.5/5 and wrote, "Check has the potential to be an engaging prison drama but falters in portions it’s supposed to excel in." Hemanth Kumar in his review for Firstpost says, "For all the drama director Chandrasekhar Yeleti tries to create, the proceedings aren’t engaging enough and the protagonist's journey is lacklustre at best."

Sangeetha Devi of The Hindu opined that "Check might be one of Chandra Sekhar Yeleti’s weakest films." She felt that the narrative seemed shaky, and the story arc seemed predictable. On the technical aspects, Devi added that "Rahul Srivastav’s cinematography, Kalyani Malik’s background score, and the production design work well for the film." The Indian Express journalist Gabbeta Ranjith Kumar stated, "Despite its novel idea and some good performances, Nithiin-starrer starts resembling The Shawshank Redemption as it inches closer to the climax."

=== Box office ===
Check grossed ₹14 crore in its opening weekend with a distributor share of ₹7 crore. By the end of its first week, it earned distributors a share of ₹9 crore.
