= Footage (film) =

2024 Malayalam film

- Theatrical release poster
- Directed by: Saiju Sreedharan
- Written by: Shabna Muhammed; Saiju Sreedharan
- Produced by: Bineesh Chandran; Saiju Sreedharan
- Starring: Manju Warrier; Vishak Nair; Gayathri Ashok
- Cinematography: Shinoz
- Distributed by: Movie Bucket
- Release date: 23 August 2024
- Running time: 126 minutes
- Country: India
- Language: Malayalam

Footage is a 2024 Indian Malayalam-language thriller film directed by Saiju Sreedharan (in his directorial debut). The film stars Manju Warrier alongside Vishak Nair and Gayathri Ashok. The film is a found-footage film, a format presenting the narrative through video recordings created by the characters themselves. It is the second found footage movie in Malayalam after Nirmal Baby Varghese's Vazhiye.

== Plot ==
A found-footage film revolving around the story of a curious couple.

== Cast ==
- Manju Warrier as The mysterious woman
- Vishak Nair as The young man
- Gayathri Ashok as The young girl

== Production ==
The film is produced by Bineesh Chandran and Saiju Sreedharan under the banners of Movie Bucket, Pale Blue Dot Films, Cast n Co Entertainments. The film is co-produced by Rahul Rajeev and Suraj Menon, and presented by Anurag Kashyap.

== Music ==
The film features original soundtracks by an Indian post-rock band Aswekeepsearching.

== Release ==
The film was originally scheduled for a theatrical release on 2 August 2024. However, the release date was postponed to 23 August 2024, due to the Wayanad landslide. The film released digitally on Sun NXT from September 5, 2025.

== Reception ==
Sanjith Sidhardhan of OTTplay rated the film four out of five stars and wrote that "What truly makes this Manju Warrier-starrer a standout film is its immersive experience. It's a film that will keep you on the edge of your seat during its most thrilling portions." Rohit Panikker of Times Now rated the film four out of five stars and wrote that "The film begins on a sluggish note as it takes the time to introduce and explore its primary characters, but once the narrative moves beyond this point, the pace picks up and the thrills keep building as well."

Vivek Santhosh of The New Indian Express rated the film three out of five stars and wrote that "A technically sleek film that's refreshing despite the roadblocks". Arjun Ramachandran of The South First gave it three out of five stars and wrote that "Footage excels as an experimental film, with fine performances from the lead actors, particularly Manju Warrier."

S. R. Praveen of The Hindu wrote that "In his debut directorial, film editor Saiju Sreedharan leans heavily on the experimental element to take forward the narrative, which is not helped much by the sparse screenplay and thin material".
