= G. Suresh Kumar =

Indian film producer

G.Suresh Kumar
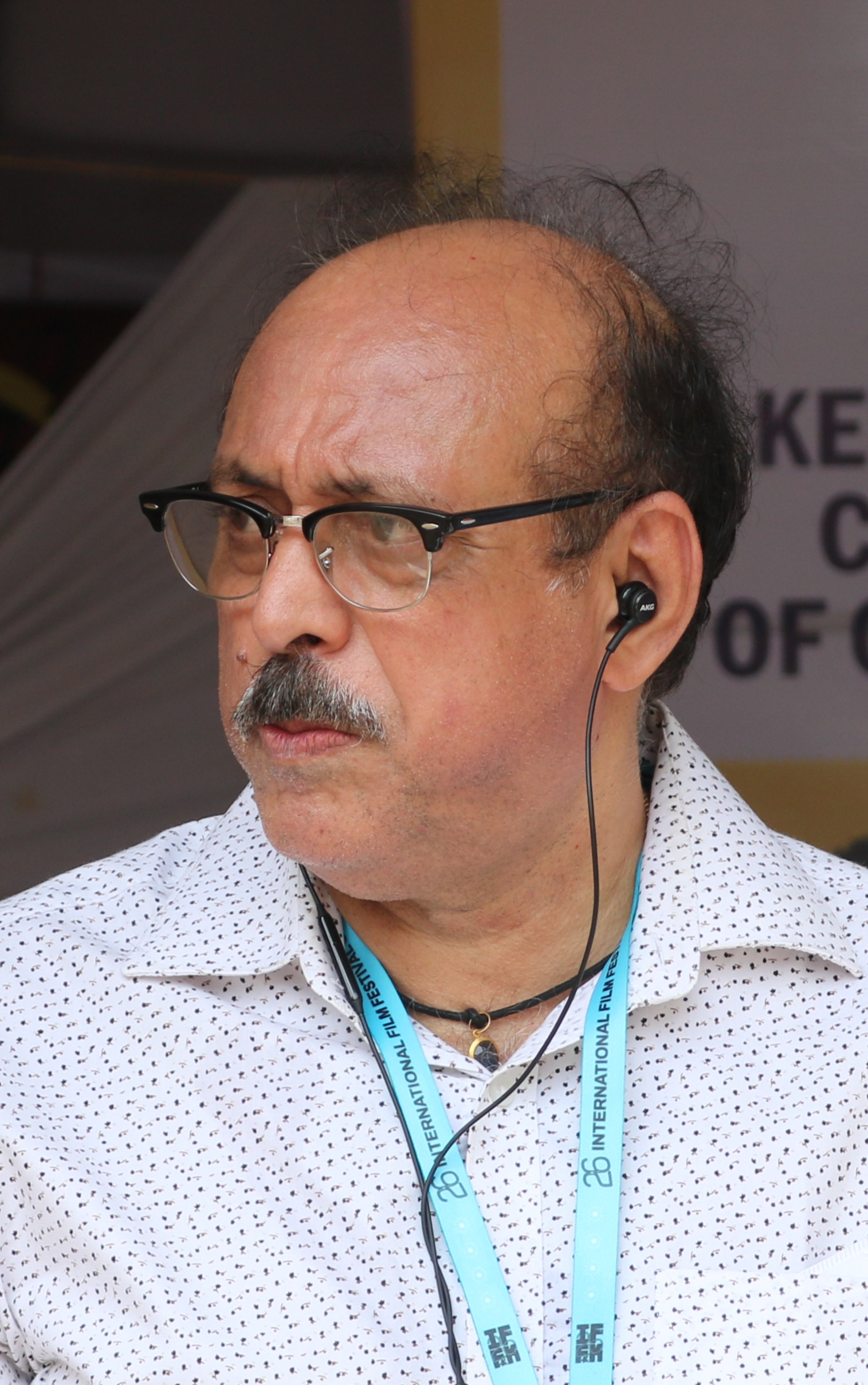
- Suresh Kumar at the 2022 International Film Festival of Kerala
- Born: Trivandrum, Kerala, India
- Education: Bachelor of Commerce, University of Kerala
- Occupations: Film producer; actor
- Years active: 1982–present
- Spouse: Menaka (m. 1987)
- Children: 2 (incl. Keerthy Suresh)

G. Suresh Kumar is an Indian film producer and actor known for Poochakkoru Mookkuthi and Aaraam Thampuran. He produces films under the banner Revathy Kalamandhir an Indian film production company based in Thiruvananthapuram which is founded in 1993 by him and he produced more than 32 Malayalam films under this banner.

== Early and personal life ==
Kumar completed his bachelor's in commerce from Kerala University in Trivandrum. He married Menaka, an Indian actress who appeared in more than 125 films. The pair have two daughters named Keerthy Suresh, an actress, and Revathy Suresh who is an associate director to Priyadarsan.

== Career ==
Kumar started his career in film as an assistant director with the Malayalam feature film named Thiranottam in 1978. By 1982, he started producing feature films under the banner Sooryodaya Creations. Then he produced about 32 Malayalam-language films under his current banner Revathy Kalaamandhir. Besides producing films, Suresh started his career in acting in 2015 and as of the year 2021 he appeared in 21 films as an actor. He is the President of Kerala Film Chamber of Commerce. He made an embarking role in the film Marakkar: Lion of the Arabian Sea as Kochi Raja.

== Filmography ==
=== Producer ===
Year	Title	Notes
1983	Coolie	
1984	Poochakkoru Mookuthi	
1984	Odaruthammava Aalariyam	
1985	Aram + Aram = Kinnaram	
1985	Akkare Ninnoru Maran	
1986	Ayalvasi Oru Daridravasi	
1986	Viswasichalum Illenkilum	
1986	Rakkuyilin Ragasadassil	
1989	Charithram	
1991	Vishnulokam	
1993	Butterflies	
1994	Kashmeeram	
1995	Thakshashila	
1997	Aaraam Thampuran	
1999	Kanezhuthi Pottum Thottu	
2000	Pilots	
2000	Cover Story	
2001	Achaneyanenikkishtam	
2002	Shivam	
2002	Kadha	
2002	Kuberan	
2004	Vettam	
2006	Mahasamudram	
2008	Pachamarathanalil	
2009	Seetha Kalyanam	
2009	Neelathamara	
2011	Rathinirvedam	
2012	Chattakkari	
2017	Match Box	
2022	Vaashi	

=== Actor ===
Year	Title	Role	Notes
1990	No.20 Madras Mail		
2015	Njan Samvidhanam Cheyyum		
2017	Ramaleela		
2018	Pacha		
2018	Aanakkallan	C.M. C.P Ramachandran	
2018	Oru Kuprasidha Payyan	Judge Jayadevan	
2019	Irupathonnaam Noottaandu	Zaya's father	
2019	Naan Petta Makan		
2019	Mera Naam Shaji	Thomas Parangadi Moran	
2019	Jack & Daniel	DGP	
2019	Madhura Raja	Minister Koshy	
2019	Sathyam Paranja Viswasikkuvo	Geetha's father	
2019	Mamangam	Mamangam announcer	
2019	2403 ft.	Anoto Joseph	
2021	Marakkar: Lion of the Arabian Sea	Kochi Raja	
2021	Divorce		
2021	Meri Awas Suno	Dr. Venugopal	
2021	Thimiram		
2021	Bermuda		
2021	Ellam Shariyakum	Sukumaran Nair	
2022	CBI 5: The Brain	Home Minister Abdul Samad	
2023	Kolaambi	Varghese	
2024	Hunt	Dr. Narayanacharya Potti	
2026	Ee Thani Niram †	TBA	
TBA	Veekam †	TBA	
TBA	Ram †	TBA	
