= Mahasamudram =

2006 Indian Malayalam drama film

- Directed by: S. Janardanan
- Written by: S. Janardanan
- Produced by: G. Suresh Kumar
- Starring: Mohanlal; Laila Mehdin; Rahman; Jagathy Sreekumar; Innocent; Jagadeesh
- Cinematography: Shaji Kumar
- Edited by: L. Bhoominathan
- Music by: M. Jayachandran; Kannan Sooraj Balan (score)
- Production company: Revathy Kalamandhir
- Distributed by: Seven Arts Release
- Release date: 1 September 2006
- Country: India
- Language: Malayalam

Mahasamudram (transl. The great ocean) is a 2006 Indian Malayalam-language romantic action film written and directed by S. Janardanan (in his directorial debut) and produced by G. Suresh Kumar through Revathy Kalamandhir. It stars Mohanlal, Laila Mehdin, Rahman,Jagathy Sreekumar,Innocent and Jagadeesh. The film features songs composed by M. Jayachandran and background score by Kannan Sooraj Balan. Mahasamudram was released on the occasion of Onam in 2006.

== Plot ==
Isahak is a fisherman and football player. He is an honest and kind man with his heart in the right place. He is the pivot around which an old-age home run by a priest revolves. Isahak bears the entire expenses of the home, one of whose inmates is his mentally ill father Velankani. Incidentally, Isahak is also the star player of his football club called Beach Eleven of Puthenkara. Their arch-rivals belonging to village Mattukara are named the Seven Stars. Mattukara is under the control of the villains.

As it often happens, Isahak falls in love with Mattakara Chandran's sister Devi. The brother is not amused, and he vows to frustrate the lovers' plans. Unfazed, the lovers get married on the high seas and plan to spend their first night on the boat. The bride's brother is bent on killing the newly-wed couple.

But fate has other ideas. In the melee that follows, Devi accidentally kills her brother. She is arrested, and a heartbroken Isahak is left to fend for himself. In another twist in the tale, the villains of Mattukara kidnap Isahak's father Velankani. Their condition for releasing him: Isahak should not play in the football match for Beach Eleven in the tournament.

Meanwhile, Devi comes out of jail on parole. The denouement puts Isahak in a dilemma. He is caught between his wife and father.

== Cast ==
- Mohanlal as Isahak
- Laila as Devi
- Rahman as Rariachan
- Jagathy Sreekumar as Father Abraham
- Innocent as Velankani Isahak's father
- Jagadeesh as Hamsa
- Krishna Prasad as Thampi
- Sai Kumar as M.L.A Sebastian George / Seban
- Joy as Mattakara Prathapan
- Indrans as Kapyar Chackochan
- M. R. Gopakumar as Unni Pillai
- Suja Karthika as Chandrika
- Kalasala Babu as Mattakara Velu Pillai
- Rizabava as Mattakara Chandran, Devi's elder brother
- Baburaj as Mattakara Rajan
- Biju Pappan as Mattakara Mathews
- Niyas Musliyar as Justin
- Subair as CI Alex
- Seema G. Nair as Usha, Devi's sister
- Manka Mahesh as Martha, Isahak's mother
- I. M. Vijayan as himself
- Poojappura Ravi
- Santhakumari

== Production ==
The second schedule of filming was held at Thiruvananthapuram and Andaman Islands. Climax scenes were shot at Vizhinjam Beach, Thiruvananthapuram.

== Soundtrack ==
The film's soundtrack contains five songs, all composed by M. Jayachandran and lyrics by Kaithapram Damodaran Namboothiri.

No.	Title	Singer(s)
1	"Kando Kando"	G. Venugopal, K. S. Chitra
2	"Chandirane Kayyileduth"	Alex Kayyalaykkal
3	"Kadale Chirichu"	Kuttappan
4	"Maanmizhi Poovu"	K. J. Yesudas
5	"Maanmizhi Poovu [F]"	Preetha Kannan

== Release and reception ==
The film was originally scheduled to be released on 25 August 2006, but was postponed because the makers decided to shoot one more song featuring Mohanlal and to not compete with Mohanlal's Keerthichakra which was already running successfully in theatres. Mahasamudram was released on 1 September 2006 on the occasion of Onam.

A critic from Indiaglitz wrote that "The screenplay by the director himself is interlocked with crisp dialogues, as good paced narration, camera angles and lighting match the mood of the film demands and the background score by Kannan fits aptly to the entire proceedings". On the contrary, a critic from Rediff.com wrote that "Debutant director Dr S Janardhanan, who is also the writer of this film, seems to have no control on the sub-plots that are left halfway without any conclusion".

== Box office ==
Mahasamudram was the top-grossing film among the Onam releases in Kerala in the initial weeks, beating Classmates. However, Classmates surpassed the film in the following weeks. The film was a commercial success at the box office.
