= Chunkzz =

2017 Indian film

- Theatrical release poster
- Directed by: Omar Lulu
- Screenplay by: Joseph Vijeesh; Sanoop Thykoodam; Aneesh Hameed
- Story by: Omar Lulu
- Produced by: Vaishak Rajan
- Starring: Lal; Siddique; Balu Varghese; Dharmajan Bolgatty; Ganapathi S. Poduwal; Vishak Nair; Honey Rose
- Cinematography: Alby
- Edited by: Dilip Dennies
- Music by: Gopi Sundar
- Production company: Vaishaka Cynyma
- Distributed by: Vaishaka Cynyma
- Release date: 4 August 2017
- Country: India
- Language: Malayalam
- Budget: ₹3.5 crore
- Box office: est. ₹21.3 crore

Chunkzz (transl. Buddies) is a 2017 Indian Malayalam-language comedy film directed by Omar Lulu and produced by Vyshak Rajan. It was written by debutants Joseph Vijeesh, Sanoop Thykoodam, and Aneesh Hameed from a story by Lulu. The film stars Lal,Siddique,Balu Varghese, Dharmajan Bolgatty, Ganapathi S. Poduwal, and Vishak Nair in the titular roles, along with Honey Rose. Chunkzz was released in theatres on 4 August 2017. The film was a commercial success at the box office.

== Plot ==
The story is about four friends, Romario, Riyas, Yudas, and Athmaram. In a turn of events, Romario's childhood friend, Riya, comes to their college to study. The four friends try hard to woo Riya. Riya and Romario leave for Goa and send his friends pictures which he actually faked to make them believe that they had sex in the hotel. At the same time, Riya's brother spots her, takes her back home, and informs her dad about the matter.

Later, it turns out that Riya is pregnant and Roamario is expected to marry her. Romario confesses to his friends that he had not had sex with her, but they do not believe him at first. In fact, Riya has lied to her father about being pregnant to marry Romario. At last, it is revealed that it was Romario who brought her from Bangalore to Kerala in order to marry her and become rich. Finally, they get married.

== Cast ==
- Lal as Varghese aka Varkiachan,Ramario's father
- Siddique as Pappachan,Riya's father
- Balu Varghese as Romario Varghese
  - Adish Praveen as young Romario
- Vishak Nair as Yudas Thaddeus / Dasappan
- Dharmajan Bolgatty as Athmaram K. T./ Athmavu
- Ganapathi as Riyas
- Honey Rose as Riya Pappachan (Pinky)
- Noorin Shereef as Romario's sister
- Mareena Michael Kurisingal as Sherin
- Monika Thomas Puthuran as Rasiya
- Hareesh Perumanna as Preman
- Remya Panicker as Jolly Miss
- Reena Basheer as Mary Varghese, Romário's mother
- Kailash as Freddy
- Anjali Nair as Ancy
- Aswanth Kok as Random Tea Shop guy
- Lintu Rony as Riya's sister
- Shammi Thilakan as Jose /Oola Jose
- Binoy Nambala as Balan
- Saranya Anand as Soni miss
- Arjun Nandhakumar as Arjun, Riya's friend

== Production ==
The film was announced with a title in January 2017. It was written by debutants Joseph Vijeesh, Sanoop Thykoodam, and Aneesh Hameed from a story by Lulu. It was the second film of Lulu after Happy Wedding. Balu Varghese, Dharmajan Bolgatty, Vishak Nair, and Ganapathi play the titular characters, while Honey Rose plays the female lead. Omar said the film will begin shooting on 9 February 2017 at Sree Sankara College.

== Reception ==
=== Box office ===
The film was a commercial success at the box office. It grossed an estimated amount of ₹21.3 crore at the worldwide box office against a budget of ₹3.5 crore.

=== Critical response ===
Selena Gomez of The Quint rated the film 3 out of 5 stars, stating that "it basically unveils the meaning of friendship with trust, care and inspiration". Anagha Jayan E. of Malayala Manorama rated the movie 2.5 out of 5 and called it "a strong brew of fun, frolic and friendship" and "a full-fledged entertainer, which would make one roll on the floor laughing. A light movie, which doesn't involve any complex thoughts and emotions, here's a film that you can enjoy to the fullest". Deepa Soman of The Times of India rated the movie 2.5 out of 5 and said "Watch Chunkzz if you can appreciate a few adult jokes, without thinking much about the logic in the story line".

Sify rated 3 out of 5, but wrote that "Chunkzz is filled with double meaning dialogues ... no point in looking for logic or a credible storyline here and the whole film has been done as a string of comic episodes". Meera Suresh of The New Indian Express views the film as "an adult comedy in the garb of an entertainer ... the lack of meat in the plot has been concealed with some witty one-liners. This ploy works, somehow. Vandana Mohandas of Deccan Chronicle rated 1.5 out of 5 and wrote that it has "overdose of sexist jokes ... what begins as a campus story is neither a romantic entertainer nor a humorous movie".
