= Vishak Nair =

Indian Film Actor

- Born: 25 April 1992 (age 34); Kochi, Kerala, India
- Education: National Institute of Technology Karnataka
- Occupations: Actor; Director; Screenwriter; Casting Director
- Years active: 2016–present
- Spouse: Jayapria Nair (m. 2022)

Vishak Nair is an Indian actor who works predominantly in Malayalam films along with a few Hindi films. He debuted as an actor in the 2016 film Aanandam.

== Early and personal life ==
Vishak Nair was born on 25 April 1992 in Kochi, Kerala, India to S. Balachandran Nair, a Chartered Accountant, and Jaya Balachandran. He had a young brother who died due to a malignant brain tumour. He was raised in Rolla Sharjah, where he had "fond memories" and "used to play football and cricket daily in the heat". Due to his upbringing there, he can speak Hindi and Malayalam. Though he could speak Malayalam in his early years, he could not read or write until he eventually learnt it. He completed his schooling from Delhi Private School, Sharjah where he was good at studies and extra-curricular activities. In high school, he participated in theatre and cultural activities and festivals. He holds a degree in Mechanical engineering from the National Institute of Technology Karnataka. He is also trained in western classical music from K M Conservatory, AR Rahman's music school. After completing his education, he worked at Daimler India Commercial Vehicles. However, he resigned to join The Little Theatre in Chennai to pursue acting.

On 9 June 2022, Nair married Jayapria Nair in a ceremony in Bengaluru.

== Career ==
Nair debuted as an actor in the 2016 film Aanandam, a coming-of-age story that received critical acclaim and was a commercial success. He went on to star in several other Malayalam films including Chunkzz (2017), Puthen Panam (2017), Matchbox (2017), Chembarathipoo (2017), and Aana Alaralodalaral (2017).

He further appeared in Lonappante Mamodeesa (2019), Kuttymama (2019), and Thimiram (2021) and ventured into web series with his well-received performance in Kili (2021). Additionally, he directed a two part music video for Aabha Hanjura's Roshewalla which was featured in Rolling Stone Magazine's Top Ten Music Videos of 2019.

In 2022, Nair made his Hindi debut with the film Shabaash Mithu, in which he played a supporting role alongside Taapsee Pannu. He also had cameo appearances in the Malayalam films Hridayam, in which he was also the casting director, Wonder Women, and Dear Friend. He directed the music video for Vineet Vincent's Colour, which was met with critical acclaim upon its release. In 2024, he played a role in the film LLB: Life Line of Bachelors and his performance in the survival thriller Exit which was well received by critics.

He portrayed the role of Sanjay Gandhi in Kangana Ranaut's directorial Emergency.

== Filmography ==
- Note: All films are in Malayalam unless otherwise noted

Year	Title	Role	Notes
2016	Aanandam	Unnikrishnan Pillai	
2017	Puthan Panam	Sunil	
2017	Chunkzz	Yudas Thaddeus	
2017	Matchbox	Ashok Raj	
2017	Chembarathipoo		
2017	Aana Alaralodalaral	Achootty	
2019	Lonappante Mamodeesa	Sony	
2019	Kuttymama	Sachin	
2019	Thimiram	Ram	
2020	Kili	Kili	Web series
2022	Hridayam	Passenger on train	Cameo appearance; Also casting director
2022	Dear Friend	Shyam's brother	
2022	Shabaash Mithu	Chandran	Hindi film
2022	Wonder Women	Doctor	English film
2023	Tejas	Prashant	Hindi film
2024	Exit	Siraj Rawther	
2024	Footage	The young man	
2024	LLB: Life Line of Bachelors	Salmaan	
2025	Emergency	Sanjay Gandhi	Hindi film
2025	Identity	Nakul	
2025	Officer on Duty	Christy Savio	
2025	Nancy Rani	Motti	
2025	Lokah Chapter 1: Chandra	Man at the pub	Cameo appearance
2026	Chatha Pacha	Cherian Maani	
2026	Merri Boys		
2026	Unmadham		
