= Chatha Pacha =

2026 film by Adhvaith Nayar

- Theatrical release poster
- Directed by: Adhvaith Nayar
- Screenplay by: Sanoop Thykoodam; Amal Shah
- Story by: Adhvaith Nayar
- Produced by: Shihan Shoukath; Ritesh S. Ramakrishnan
- Starring: Arjun Ashokan; Roshan Mathew; Vishak Nair; Ishan Shoukath
- Cinematography: Anend C. Chandran; Additional Cinematography: Jomon T. John; Sudeep Elamon
- Edited by: Praveen Prabhakar
- Music by: Songs: Shankar-Ehsaan-Loy; Score: Mujeeb Majeed
- Production company: Reel World Entertainment
- Distributed by: see below
- Release date: 22 January 2026
- Running time: 134 minutes
- Country: India
- Language: Malayalam
- Box office: ₹35.51 crore

Chatha Pacha: The Ring of Rowdies (slang for "Do or Die") is a 2026 Indian Malayalam-language action-comedy film directed by Adhvaith Nayar and written by Sanoop Thykoodam. The film follows three brothers who establish an amateur, locally-run, WWE-inspired underground wrestling promotion in Fort Kochi. The film stars Arjun Ashokan, Roshan Mathew, Vishak Nair, and Ishan Shoukath, along with Siddique and Lakshmi Menon in supporting roles. Mammooty makes a cameo appearance.

The music was composed by Shankar–Ehsaan–Loy. The film was officially announced in March 2025. Principal photography began in June 2025 and concluded by November 2025.

The film was released on 22 January 2026. The film is considered a box office success (hit) grossing 35.51 crores.

== Cast ==
- Arjun Ashokan as Savio "Loco" Lobo
  - Alwin Mukund as Young Savio
- Roshan Mathew as Vetrivel "Vetri" Lobo
  - Archith Abhilash as Young Vetri
- Vishak Nair as Cherian Maani
  - Dev Narayanan as Young Cherian
- Ishan Shoukath as Thomas "Little" Lobo / Toofan
  - Orhan Hyder as Young Little
- Lakshmi Menon as Uma
- Siddique as Mayor S. R. Shivan
- Sai Kumar as Kallath Maani, Cherian's father
- Rafi as Falgu Aashaan
- Carmen S. Mathew as Kuruvi "Nitro Kili"
- Dartaganan Sabu as Subramaniam “Kadalkomban”
- Vyshnav Biju as Ashkar “Jango Sulthan”
- Syamaprakash MS as Varkey “Bhasmasuran”
- Muthumani as Lotus, Little's mother
- Minon as Kunjappan
- Tosh Christy as Jinson
- Toj Christy as Johnson
- Krishna Nambiar as Diaz
- Steffi Francis as Angoorlatha
- Aarav Umesh as Chippaan
- Thesni Khan as Suprajamma (Subramaniam's mother)
- Vedhika Sreekumar as Rose "Rosamma", Vetri's daughter

Cameo appearance

- Mammootty as "Bullet" Walter Lopez
- Zarin Shihab as Jasmine, Vetri's late wife
- Adhvaith Nayar as himself
- Shihan Shoukath as himself
- Amal Shah as Macaw Machan
- Khalid Al Ameri as himself

== Production ==
=== Development ===
Chatha Pacha: The Ring of Rowdies is the directorial debut of Adhvaith Nayar, Mohanlal's nephew who previously collaborated as an assistant director with notable filmmakers such as Jeethu Joseph and Rajeev Ravi. Nayar recalled that, during his childhood he grew up watching WWE on television with his cousins and grandfather and the influence of WWE in India, where professional westlers such as John Cena, The Undertaker, Triple H and Dwayne Johnson (known as "The Rock") becoming mythic figures, had led to the development of small wrestling clubs abroad. These prompted him to develop a script based on the film, being the first to be centred on WWE-based sports theme.

Nayar initially wrote a "much darker and more neo-noir" based on the idea, but the disbelief around the idea of an underground wrestling club in Fort Kochi, Mattancherry led to the script being shelved. Years later, when Nayar showed the cover page of the old idea he pitched to the brothers Shihan Shoukath and Ishan Shoukath, they were instantly hooked by it, which led Shihan to join as the creative producer of the film. Chatha Pacha marked the maiden production of Reel World Entertainment, jointly presented and produced by Ritesh S. Ramakrishnan and Ramesh S. Ramakrishnan, and the film was officially announced on 9 March 2025 with the title. Nayar added that beyond wrestling, the film also focused on the themes of brotherhood, family and friendship, to have a universal appeal among all demographic. Ishan Shoukath stated that the title was adopted from a dialogue delivered by Salim Kumar to Dileep in the film Kalyanaraman (2002).

=== Pre-production ===
The film began pre-production in August 2024 and continued scripting till early-2025. Sanoop Thykoodam wrote the screenplay and dialogues for the film. Originally the film was titled Ring of Rowdies, but they decided something to be locally, especially in the slang of Mattancherry. Thykoodam deciphered the title Chatha Pacha (transl. do or die) which felt to be apt for the film and the attitude and meaning, reflected the all or nothing mindset from the characters.

Since both Nayar and Shihan were debutants, they decided to lean on experienced technicians, with cinematographer Anand C Chandran, editor Praveen Prabhakar, production designer Sunil Das and action choreographer Kalai Kingston being part of the technical crew. Arjun Ashokan, Roshan Mathew, Vishak Nair and Ishan Shoukath were announced as the part of the cast.

=== Filming ===
Principal photography for the film commenced on 11 June 2025. The production was split into three schedules, where the first schedule held at Fort Kochi and places around Mattanchery for around 36 days, while the remaining two schedules, which included the wrestling sequences were filmed in sets and indoor locations. Filming was wrapped on 8 November 2025.

=== Stunts ===
Nayar added that the film was over-the-top by design. Hence, instead of conventional fights, the team leaned into theatrical wrestling, with Kingson having to shaping the stunts. All of the cast members were involved in wrestling training for three months, divided into three different types. One was customised to each person based on their appearance and character. The second training was done to prevent from injuries, which was conducted by training. Mathew recalled that the injury training was done on the set of muscles prone to danger, which included the smaller muscle groups that suffer the most strain during dynamic wrestling.

The third type of training involved the flips and rolls, done by Shravan. Though not being combat moves, these were helpful for the actors to shoot stunt sequences, by doing jumps, flips and rolls. Each actor were given specific set of moves on their comfort, which informed the choreography done by Kingston and his teams. Mathew denoted that the toughest move for him to learn was the diving roll (spear). Both Mathew and Ashokan considered Chatha Pacha to be one of their most physically demanding films, based on the rigorous training and extensive wrestling stunts involved.

== Music ==
The film marks the Malayalam debut of Shankar-Ehsaan-Loy as music composers with lyrics penned by Vinayak Sasikumar and background score by Mujeeb Majeed. T-Series acquired the music rights of the film.

== Marketing ==
The team collaborated with Topps to launch trading card collectibles, a first-of-a-kind for Malayalam cinema. A video game based on the film, titled Chatha Pacha Clash was also launched on iOS and Android operating systems.

== Release ==
=== Theatrical ===
Chatha Pacha: The Ring of Rowdies was released in theatres on 22 January 2026. The Tamil-dubbed version was released on 6 February 2026, followed by the Telugu-dubbed version on 13 February 2026.

=== Box Office ===
The film grossed ₹7.73 crores on its 1st day in the Global Box Office Collection. The film grossed ₹14.04 crores in its 2nd day of release

=== Distribution ===
Dharma Productions acquired the theatrical distribution rights for Northern India, marking its first-ever association with a Malayalam film. Mythri Movie Makers secured the Malayalam rights for Andhra Pradesh and Telangana, while Asian Suresh Entertainment bagged the Telugu rights for the region. Dulquer Salmaan's Wayfarer Films obtained the Kerala distribution rights. PVR Inox Pictures acquired the rights for Tamil Nadu and Karnataka, and The Plot Pictures holds the overseas distribution rights.

=== Home Media ===
The post-theatrical digital streaming rights were acquired by Netflix. The film began streaming on the platform from 19 February 2026.

== Reception ==
Vishal Menon of The Hollywood Reporter India wrote "Chatha Pacha may not be a Stone Cold stunner, but works as a lovingly-made tribute to a group of boys, who dared to try it at home... just like we all did."

Sajin Shrijith of The Week wrote "With its post-intermission segments being stronger than the rest, Chatha Pacha is like that wrestling match that proves rewarding if you are patient enough to stay with it, instead of being irked with the few unremarkable and familiar bits we see early on, and a couple of attempts at forced humour."

Gopika I. S. of The Times of India wrote "Adhvaith Nayar's Chatha Pacha is a film with its share of ups and downs. There are portions that are highly entertaining, followed by stretches where the narrative seems to jump all over the place. While the decision to limit the personal interactions between the two lead characters is understandable—given the chosen premise and central conflict—those interactions could have been developed more effectively."

Anandu Suresh of The Indian Express wrote "Whenever it shifts to the wrestling matches, Chatha Pacha is immediately as good as it can get. Not only is the staging and overall execution in such scenes extraordinary, but the performances are also splendid, truly giving the experience of watching live professional wrestling matches. When the narrative glides through the mundane, everyday drama of Vetri, Savio, Little, and Rose, Chatha Pacha never truly lands, largely because of poor writing."

Sanjay Ponnappa of India Today wrote "Chatha Pacha: The Ring of Rowdies arrived with a lot of anticipation but struggles to match up to it. The promotional material largely highlighted the film’s fun, pro-wrestling-centric elements, and the makers would have benefited from leaning more into that strength. In attempting to add drama, the film ends up in an in-between space – neither wholly entertaining nor effectively dramatic – ultimately resembling a child stuck between two boats, barely holding on."

S. R. Praveen of The Hindu wrote "The popularity of WWE owed more to the careful scripting of its fight sequences, even though it had hardly any similarity to the actual sport of wrestling. Chatha Pacha gets the dynamics of WWE right, but fails to script a compelling narrative. It becomes an unfortunate case of falling flat while making a stylish signature move."

Vignesh Madhu of The New Indian Express wrote "WWE has never been about who wins, but about how convincingly the performers sell the spectacle. On those terms, the wrestlers of Chatha Pacha emerge victorious."

Swathi P. Ajith of OnManorama wrote "Chatha Pacha: The Ring of Rowdies may not break new narrative ground, but it works as an entertainer driven by energy, nostalgia, and visual bravado. It knows exactly what it wants to be and largely delivers on that promise. For audiences willing to surrender to its noise and nostalgia, the film offers a sweaty, chaotic, and unapologetically theatrical experience."
