= LLB: Life Line of Bachelors =

2024 Indian drama film directed by A. M. Sidhique

- Theatrical Poster
- Directed by: A. M. Sidhique
- Written by: A. M. Sidhique
- Produced by: Mujeeb Randathani
- Starring: Sreenath Bhasi; Anoop Menon; Vishak Nair; Aswanth Lal
- Cinematography: Faisal Ali
- Edited by: Athul Vijay
- Music by: Bijibal; Kailas Menon
- Production company: Randathani Films
- Distributed by: Good Fellas in Films
- Release date: 2 February 2024
- Running time: 122 minutes
- Country: India
- Language: Malayalam

LLB: Life Line of Bachelors is a 2024 Indian Malayalam-language campus drama thriller film written and directed by A. M. Sidhique. The film was produced by Mujeeb Randathani under the banner of Randathani Films. The film stars Sreenath Bhasi, Vishak Nair, Aswanth Lal, and Anoop Menon in lead roles. The cinematography was handled Faisal Ali, and Athul Vijay took charge of the editing.

Principal photography began in May 2022. The shooting took place in and around Kozhikode, Kerala. The music and background score were composed by Bijibal and Kailas Menon. LLB: Life Line of Bachelors was theatrically released on 2 February 2024.

== Premise ==
The film goes through the life of three LL.B. students named Sibi, Sanju, and Salmaan. LLB tells us about the friendships, college moments, and multiple events happened in the life of these three students.

== Cast ==
- Sreenath Bhasi as Sibi
- Anoop Menon as CI Babu Sebastian
- Vishak Nair as Salmaan
- Aswanth Lal as Sanju
- Sreejith Ravi as Krishna Prasad
- Ramesh Kottayam as Irikkur Divakaran
- Manoj K. U. as Sabu
- Sudheesh as Shivadasan
- Pradeep Balan as Thajukka
- Sibi K Thomas as Mujeeb
- Karthika Suresh as Akhila
- Seema G. Nair as Sarojini
- Roshan Abdul Rahoof as Roshan
- Nissar Mamukkoya as Valsan Kadalundi
- Nadira Mehrin as Roshni Jayaraj
- Chaithra Praveen as Salma
- Kavitha Baiju

== Production ==
The title of the film was officially announced on 7 May 2022. This was the directorial debut of A. M. Sidhique.

=== Filming ===
The makers started the principal photography on 5 May 2022 with the switch-on ceremony and completed it on 5 June 2022. It took 31 days to complete the shoot on 2 different schedules. The major shooting was completed in Kozhikode, Kerala. The post-production of the film started in July 2022.

== Music ==
The original background score and songs were composed by Bijibal and Kailas. The music rights were obtained by TrendMusic. The song "Paarukayaay Patarukayaay" was released on 19 January with a special appearance played by Roshan Adbul Rahoof.

== Release ==
The film was initially planned to release on 19 January 2024. Later the release postponed to 2 February 2024.

== Reception ==
=== Critical response ===
Princy Alexander of Manorama Online wrote LLB: Life Line of Bachelors is not a film that wishes to explore the life of students in law colleges or their firebrand politics, which was explored in movies like Jana Gana Mana.
