= Thimiram =

2019 Malayalam-language film

Thimiram is a 2019 Indian Malayalam-language film by Sivaram Mony starring K K Sudhakaran, Vishak Nair and Meera Nair. The film was screened at 18th Chennai International Film Festival. The film is available to stream on Neestream. The film companion gave positive reviews about the film, calling it "A well written film about how society normalizes male chauvism"

== Plot ==
The film tells the story of a seventy-year-old man's blindness regarding the way he perceives gender.

== Cast ==
- K K Sudhakaran as Sudhakaran
- Vishak Nair as Ram
- Meera Nair as Vandhana
- G. Suresh Kumar
- Ameya Mathew

== Film festivals ==
- Best Film, Tagore International Film Festival
- Chennai International Film Festival.
