= A. C. Sreehari =

Indian poet and writer (1969–2026)

A.C. Sreehari
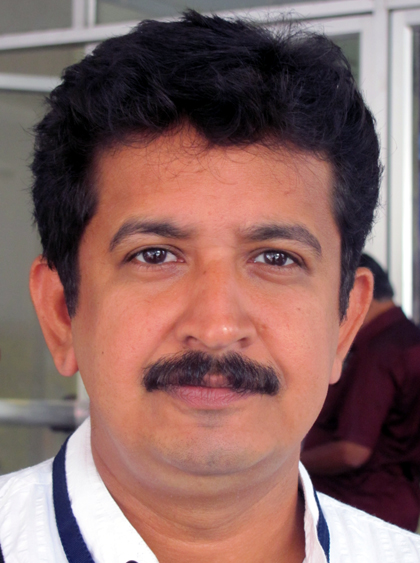
- Sreehari in 2010
- Born: A.C. Sreehari; 24 November 1969; Payyanur, Kannur district, Kerala, India
- Died: 5 June 2026 (aged 56)
- Citizenship: Indian
- Occupations: Lyricist; poet; writer; teacher
- Years active: 1990s–2026
- Notable work: Vayanavikrithi, Locating the Local
- Spouse: Sangeetha Sreehari
- Children: 1

A. C. Sreehari (24 November 1969 – 5 June 2026) was an Indian poet and writer in Malayalam literature. His poems are included in many anthologies of Malayalam writing, such as Yuvakavithakkoottam (DC Books, 1999), Kavithayute Noottaantu (SPCS, 2001) and Palathu (DC Books, 2003). He retired as the Head of Department of English of Payyanur College, Payyanur. Sreehari died on 5 June 2026, at the age of 56.

== Books ==
Year	Name	Genre
2006	Vayanavikrithi	Poem collection
2018	Locating the Local in literature and films	

== Awards ==
=== Literature awards ===
Year	Award
1996	N. N. Kakkad Award
1997	V. T. Kumaran Award
1999	Vyloppilly Award
