= Oru Adaar Love =

2019 film by Omar Lulu

- Theatrical release poster
- Directed by: Omar Lulu
- Screenplay by: Sarang Jayaprakash; Lijo Panadan
- Story by: Omar Lulu
- Produced by: Ousepachan Vaalakuzhy
- Starring: Roshan Abdul Rahoof; Priya Prakash Varrier; Siyadh Shajahan; Noorin Shereef
- Cinematography: Sinu Sidharth
- Edited by: Achu Vijayan
- Music by: Songs: Shaan Rahman; Sathyajith; Score: Shaan Rahman
- Production company: Ousepachan Movie House
- Distributed by: Ousepachan Screen Media
- Release date: 14 February 2019
- Running time: 143 minutes
- Country: India
- Language: Malayalam

Oru Adaar Love (transl. "A Fantastic Love") is a 2019 Malayalam-language romantic comedy film directed by Omar Lulu. The screenplay was written by Sarang Jayaprakash and Lijo Panadan from a story by Lulu, and produced by Ousepachan Vaalakuzhy under his production company Ousepachan Movie House. The film features Roshan Abdul Rahoof, Priya Prakash Varrier, and Noorin Shereef in the prominent roles.

The story deals with high school romance. The movie gained worldwide attention due to a clip which went viral, from the song "Manikya Malaraya Poovi". It prompted the makers to make changes in script, which delayed production. The film was released on 14 February 2019. Upon release, it received mixed reviews from critics and became underperformed at the box office. It was dubbed and released in Tamil with the same title, in Kannada as Kirik Love Story, and in Telugu as Lover's Day.

== Plot ==
This is the plot of alternate version not the original version.

The story revolves around the journey of Higher Secondary School kids from the time they first meet in class 11 until their passing out in class 12. Roshan woos Priya with the help of Gadha and his other friends. One evening Roshan and his friends get drunk and one of them accidentally sends explicit videos from Roshan's phone to the school's WhatsApp group. Roshan ends up being ridiculed by fellow schoolmates and gets suspended for a week by the School's Principal. But he still accepts it all instead of blaming his friend for it. This causes a rift between Roshan and Priya. She tells him that she's breaking up with him. But thanks to Gadha, a Police SI helps Roshan in getting his suspension cancelled soon.

Roshan and Gadha then pretend to be in love to make Priya jealous, but they end up having feelings for each other. Priya approaches Roshan and says that she has forgiven him and they can start to be in a relationship again. But Roshan is unable to forget Gadha, which comes to be known by Priya. Heartbroken, she tells Roshan that Gadha can be a perfect partner for him, not Priya, and they end their relationship.

On graduation day, Roshan decides to propose to Gadha on top of the mountain. Just as Roshan is about to propose to Gadha, they are attacked by a bunch of goons who were antagonized by Roshan and Gadha earlier as part of an eve teasing incident. Gadha is about to be raped and Roshan gets thrashed brutally before they are saved by their friends. Although Roshan is brutally wounded and Gadha is abused physically, they still beat the goons. In the end, Roshan and Gadha are seen on a bike, and they ride with their friends happily.

== Cast ==
Principal members of the cast are:

- Roshan Abdul Rahoof as Roshan
- Mathew Joseph as Mathew
- Siyadh Shajahan as Francis E. Manavalan
- Vaishak Pavanan as Vishakh Pavanan aka 'Pavanna'
- Dilruba Aswad Alqamar as Sana
- Priya Prakash Varrier as Priya Varrier
- Noorin Shereef as Gadha John
- Arun A Kumar as Arun
- Hareesh Kanaran as Unmesh Sir, P. T. Teacher
- Althaf Salim as Manikandan Sir, Chemistry Teacher
- Shivaji Guruvayoor as School Principal
- Aneesh G Menon as Shibu Sir, Maths Teacher (Thallu Shibu)
- Roshna Ann Roy as Sneha Miss, Biology Teacher
- Pradeep Kottayam as Principal's Secretary
- Vishnu Govindan as Vicky P. Sebastian
- Anjali Nair as English Teacher
- Pareekutty Perumbavoor as Senior Firoz
- Siddique as SI Jose Panadan, Gadha's uncle (Cameo)
- Sreejith Ravi as Constable Diwakaran
- Salim Kumar as Manavalan (Cameo)
- Michelle Ann Daniel as Michelle
- Suhaid (Kukku) as Akku
- Niyas Backeras Gadha's father

== Production ==
Filming started on 15 January 2018. Malayalam film producer Ousepachan Vaalakuzhy, impressed with Omar Lulu's Happy Wedding and Chunkzz decided to finance his third project, Oru Adaar Love. The primary cast was selected through audition. Ousepachan Vaalakuzhy said he likes to promote newcomers, as has he done with his previous films. After Priya Prakash Varrier's wink in the song "Manikya Malaraya Poovi" became a viral hit, the makers altered the script to give prominence to her, thus sidelining the role played by Noorin Shereef, who had initially been cast in the lead role.

== Music ==
The film music and score were composed by Shaan Rahman. The song "Manikya Malaraya Poovi" sung by Vineeth Sreenivasan, a revised modern version of a Mappila song, was uploaded on 9 February 2018 on YouTube as part of the promotions. It became a viral video at number 1 position garnering over one million views and 50,000 likes in 20 hours. The original version of "Manikya Malaraya Poovi" was written by P. M. A. Jabbar with music composition by Thalassery K. Refeeque in 1978.

Oru Adaar Love

Soundtrack album by Shaan Rahman
- Released: 2018-2019
- Recorded: 2018
- Genre: Soundtrack
- Length: 28:05
- Label: Muzik 247
- Producer: Shaan Rahman

Shaan Rahman chronology
9 (2019)	Oru Adaar Love (2018)	Sachin (2019)
External audio
- Official Audio Jukebox on YouTube

No.	Title	Lyrics	Singer(s)	Length
1.	"Manikya Malaraya Poovi"	P. M. A. Jabbar	Vineeth Sreenivasan	3:20
2.	"Freak Penne"	Sathyajith	Sathyajith, Neethu Naduvathettu	3:21
3.	"Munnale Ponaale"	Pearle Maaney	Haricharan	3:52
4.	"Thanananana Penne"	B. K. Harinarayanan	Sooraj Santhosh, Sruthy Sivadas	2:47
5.	"Forever Friend"	Sathyajith	Sachin Warrier	3:27
6.	"Aarum Kaanaathinnen"	B. K. Harinarayanan	Vineeth Sreenivasan	3:00
7.	"Maahiya"	B. K. Harinarayanan	Hesham Abdul Wahab, Jeenu Nazeer	4:20
8.	"Manichettan Song"		Sachin Raj	4:35
Total length:				24:07

== Release ==
Oru Adaar Love was released on 14 February 2019. It was dubbed in Tamil with the same title, in Kannada as Kirik Love Story and in Telugu as Lover's Day.

== Reception ==
=== Box office ===
As of 9 March 2019, the film has grossed more than ₹12 crore in India. It was made on a budget of ₹5 crore.

=== Critical reception ===
S.R. Praveen of The Hindu stated:

Oru Adaar Love on a Valentine's Day seems to be the handiwork of the culture police, for love hardly ever got such a shabby treatment on screen. If only a wink could save this experiment in mediocrity", referring to a scene from a song in the movie where the lead female actor winks, that went viral on the internet before the movie's release.

The Times of India gave 2.5 out of 5 stars, stating:

Oru Adaar Love seems like a quickly put together movie trying to cash in on the rather unexpected publicity that came its way. There are unpredictable twists in the tale, however, that may keep viewers hooked till the end.

India Today gave 2 out of 5 stars, stating:

Oru Adaar Love's lacklustre story and underdeveloped character arcs struggle hard to entertain the audience throughout the film.

The News Minute gave 1 out of 5 stars, stating:

The film appears to say that the wrongs that men do aren't really all that wrong. The misogyny doesn't even try to hide behind any ‘larger’ story like in some movies.

Times Now gave 2 out of 5 stars, stating:

The film does no justice to the title, but you can watch it to reminisce about your high school days and your first crushes. But when it comes to high school romances, I would still prefer watching Trisha Krishnan-Vijay Sethupathi's '96 (film).

The Week gave 1 out of 5 stars, stating:

One of the oft used cliches when reviewing a movie is 'old wine in new bottle'. In Omar Lulu's case, he has just a bottle and filled with some water that has the colour of wine.

News18 gave 2 out of 5 stars, stating:

Everything has been planned conveniently to suit a violent ending. What could have turned into an engaging tale of teenage realisation ends up nowhere. It's a lost opportunity.

The Indian Express gave 2 out of 5 stars, stating:

Oru Adaar Love has no plot as such except for a predictable romantic triangle that plays out between Priya Prakash Varrier, Roshan Abdul Rahoof, and Noorin Shereef. The point the film tries to make hasn't been fleshed out fully to last a two-hour long narration. The entire movie feels like one big set up to achieve a moment that's fashioned to make the audience sob.

Sify gave 2 out of 5 stars, stating:

Oru Adaar Love provides some unexpected surprises, but you would require real patience to sit through until then. It's a no brainer, often offensive school kid romance that uses every technique to entertain. If that is your idea of fun, you may find this one fine.
