= Happy Wedding (2016 film) =

2016 Indian film

- Theatrical release poster
- Directed by: Omar Lulu
- Screenplay by: Maneesh K. C. Praneesh Vijayan (dialogues)
- Story by: Omar Lulu
- Produced by: Nazir Ali
- Starring: Siju Wilson; Sharaf U Dheen; Soubin Shahir; Justin John
- Cinematography: Sinu Sidharth
- Edited by: Dileep Dennies
- Music by: Songs: Arun Muraleedharan; Background Score: Vimal T. K
- Production company: Ozone Productions
- Distributed by: Eros International
- Release date: 20 May 2016
- Country: India
- Language: Malayalam
- Budget: ₹ 1.7 crore
- Box office: ₹ 14.5 crore

Happy Wedding is 2016 Indian Malayalam-language fantasy romantic comedy film directed by debutante Omar Lulu and distributed by Eros International, starring Siju Wilson, Sharaf U Dheen, Soubin Shahir, and Justin John. It was produced by Ozone Productions. The film narrates the story of an engineering graduate (Harikrishnan) who decides to marry initially on his mother's insistence. The music was composed by Arun Muraleedharan, and the lyrics were written by Rajeev Alunkal and Harinarayanan.

Principal photography began in Kochi in November 2015 and ended in March 2016. Other shooting locations were Thrissur and Chalakudy. Some parts of the film were shot in Royal College of Engineering and Technology, Thrissur. The film was released on 20 May 2016.

== Plot ==
Hari, is a young civil engineer. He usually spends time hanging out with his cousin Manu, who is a flirt. Hari is in a relationship with a girl Lakshmi, but she is a flirt herself. Hari, Manu, and a friend Paul Achayan, go to meet her. Hari is left heartbroken when Lakshmi begins to get close to another guy. He leaves with Manu to a bar.

As Hari and Manu are drinking, they call a man, thinking he is a waiter and asks him for a beer. The man tells them that he is not waiter and joins them. He tells them that he is a motivational speaker and the boys befriend him and call him Bhai. As they are discussing about Lakshmi, Manu exclaims that Hari is a guy who always falls for love tricks. Bhai asks Hari to tell him about his college love story.

Hari and Manu were students in an engineering college with an ensemble of friends. Hari appears to be in love with Shahina. As time goes on, Hari enjoys his time with her while, Manu spends his time as a complete rascal.

Some TIME after they leave college, Hari, Manu and Tyson are caught by the police. To Hari's shock they see Shahina's father there. They are shocked to learn that Shahina is missing and Hari is the main suspect. Sub-inspector Happy Paul, who wants all cases to have a happy ending, tries to question the boys. After learning of Hari and Shahina's relation he gives his full support to them. But then, Shahina walks into the station accompanied by Pareekutty. It is revealed that Shahina and Pareekutty were in a relationship long before Hari met Shahina. Shahina's parents are happy, but Hari is left heartbroken.

Back in the present, Bhai advises Hari to completely reject Lakshmi and let himself stay strong. Following Bhai's advice, Hari tells Lakshmi that he is not a toy. Meanwhile, Manu tells Bhai that they have to persuade Hari to go meet a girl arranged by Hari's mother. When Hari returns, they ask him to go see the girl, to which he reluctantly agrees.

Sometime later, the trio board a bus for Thrissur to go to Hari's home. On the bus, they befriend some passengers. Hari and Manu sit in front of two girls, Drishya and Sophie, and befriend them. Drishya reveals that she is a cousin of their collegemate Asha and they become close. Hari seemingly falls for Drishya, but cannot express it. They then part ways once reaching Thrissur.

The next day, Hari and his gang go to see the girl. He sees the girl and is not completely convinced. But when he goes to talk to her, it is revealed that she is not the real girl. The real girl is revealed to be Drishya, much to Hari's surprise and happiness. Their marriage is subsequently arranged. As the trio depart, Lakshmi calls again. She asks Hari to call her, to which Hari replies that he will call her for his wedding. When they turn to ask Bhai for his opinion, they stunned to find him missing. They realize that they did not get his phone number and they even don't know his real name. As they search for Bhai, Hari has a vision that Bhai is Lord Krishna, who came to solve his love troubles. When he tries to tell Manu, he can't find how to explain it and they leave.

It is then revealed that Bhai is no god, but a marriage broker. He runs a matrimony called Happy Wedding Matrimony, and was asked by Hari's mother to find a suitable bride. Bhai's matrimony has a vow, that if they find two matching profiles they will get them married. It is also revealed that meeting Drishya in the bus was also a part of Bhai's plan to unite the two. He then proceeds to another marriage deal with his two assistants.

The movie ends as the newly married Hari and Drishya celebrate with Manu, Tyson, Paul Achayan and their friends.

== Cast ==
- Siju Wilson as Harikrishnan aka Hari
- Sharaf U Dheen as Manu Krishnan aka Manu
- Soubin Shahir as Bhai AKA Matrimony Consultant / Lord Krishna
- Justin John as Tyson
- Anu Sithara as Shahina
- Drishya Raghunath as Drishya
- Sudhi Koppa as Paul Achayan
- Abi as SI Happy Paul
- Diya as Asha Subramaniam
- Grace Antony as Teena
- Mareena Michael as Sophie
- Ambika Mohan as Hari's Mother
- Delna Davis as Lakshmi
- Gopan as Pomero (Cameo)
- Ishrath Sooraj Salim as Sandy (Cameo)
- Sivaji Guruvayoor as Shahina's Father
- Pareekutty Perumbavoor as Pareekutty Muthalib
- Murali as Hari's Father (via photo archive)
- Thesni Khan as bus Conductor
- Saiju Kurup as Dhanendran

== Music ==
Arun Muraleedharan composed the film's songs soundtrack and Vimal T. K. composed the score. Lyrics for the songs were written by Rajeev Alunkal.

== Release ==
Initially the film was released in around 35 theatres in Kerala, but after getting positive review the film got into 130 theatres in its first week.

=== Box office ===
The film collected around ₹3.48 crore (US$360,000) from 15 days of its release. It grossed ₹13.70 crore from worldwide box office and completed 100 days theatrical run in Kerala.
