= Omar Lulu =

Indian filmmaker

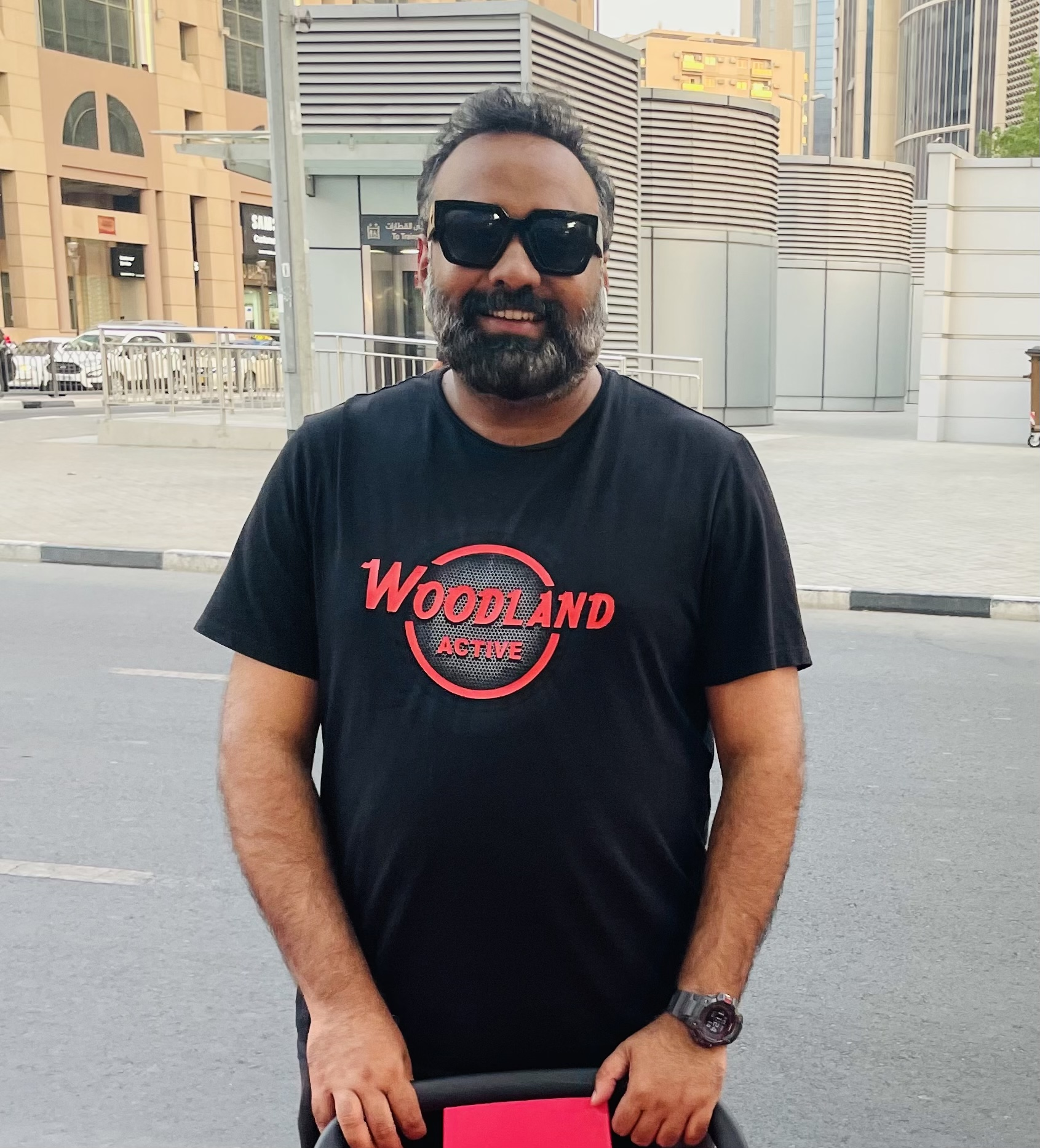
- Born: Omar Abdul Vahab; 30 October 1984 (age 41)
- Occupations: Film director Music Director
- Years active: 2016–present
- Spouse: Rinshi
- Children: 3

Omar Abdul Vahab, professionally credited as Omar Lulu, is an Indian film director who works in Malayalam cinema. He made his directorial debut in 2016 with Happy Wedding.

== Career ==
His debut film Happy Wedding starring Sharafudheen, Soubin Shahir, Siju Wilson and Justin John had a good run at the Kerala box-office and crossed 100 days run, it grossed ₹13.7 crore (US$1.4 million) at the box office. His second film, Chunkzz, starring Honey Rose and Balu Varghese, released in August 2017 and was a commercial success, collecting around 20 crore at the box office.

His third movie Oru Adaar Love was an international sensation which made Priya P Warrier an internet sensation for a wink scene from the film. It is also the first ever Malayalam film that got released in four different language (Malayalam, Telugu, Kannada and Tamil) simultaneously in over 2,000 theatres around the world. The film was a box office hit and was dubbed into Chinese, English, Arabic and all Indian languages. Dhamaka was his fourth movie released in theatres. In 2022, his fifth film titled Nalla Samayam was withdrawn from the theaters three days after its release due to a case bein filed against Omar by the Kozhikode Excise Inspector for promoting the use of the banned drug MDMA through the film. New movies in planning are Power Star starring Kannada actor Shreyas Manju, Babu Antony and freshers' LoveYathra.

Besides making films, Omar started directing musical albums by the year 2020. His last two albums, Tu Hi Hai Meri Zindagi and Jaana Meri Jaana starring Ajmal Khan and Jumana Khan was shot in Dubai in 2021.

== Filmography ==
Year	Title	Notes
2016	Happy Wedding	
2017	Chunkzz	Also storywriter
2019	Oru Adaar Love	
2020	Dhamaka	Also storywriter
2022	Nalla Samayam	Also storywriter
2024	Bad Boyz	

=== Music videos ===
- Tu Hi Hai Meri Zindagi (2021)
- Jaana Meri Jaana (2021)
- Kaanan Thonnununde (2021)

=== Television ===
- Bigg Boss (Malayalam season 5)

== Controversies ==
Drug Issue

In December 2022, Kerala Excise Department registered a case against makers of Nalla Samayam, movie directed by Omar Lulu for allegedly promoting the use of MDMA in movie's teaser. "Besides the substance, the trailer also had the scenes blindly promoting alcoholism and the makers of the movie did not even bother to show the statutory warning on the screen"; said officials.

Rape Allegations

The Nedumbassery police have registered a case against director Omar Lulu on charge of sexual abuse based on a complaint by a woman actor.

The rural police sources said the case had been registered for rape on false promise of marriage during the first half of last year. However, whether the case involved casting couch would also be probed.

The police have recorded the complainant's statement and launched an investigation. Officials said the statement of the accused would be recorded soon. Meanwhile, the director has dismissed the complaint as one motivated by economic gains.
