= Priya Prakash Varrier =

Indian actress (born 1999)

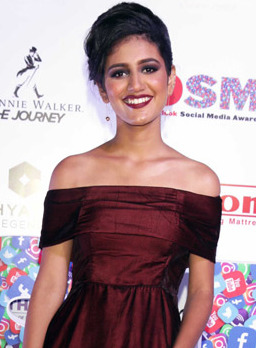
- Varrier in 2018
- Born: 28 October 1999 (age 27); Punkunnam, Kerala, India
- Education: Vimala College (B Com)
- Occupation: Actress
- Years active: 2018–present

Priya Prakash Varrier (born 28 October 1999) is an Indian actress who works in Malayalam, Telugu, Tamil, Kannada and Hindi films. Her wink in the Malayalam film Oru Adaar Love (2019) went viral, making her the most searched-for personality through Google in India in 2018. In 2025, she made an appearance in the Tamil action-comedy film Good Bad Ugly.

== Early life and education ==
Varrier was born on 28 October 1999 to Prakash Varrier, a Central Excise Department employee, and Preetha, a homemaker in Punkunnam, Thrissur, in Kerala.

She did her schooling from Sandeepani Vidya Nikethan, Thrissur. In 2018, she enrolled in a Bachelor of Commerce course at Vimala College, Thrissur.

== Career ==
Her first appearance in cinema came with Oru Adaar Love, a romantic drama set in a school. She played the role of Priya alongside several newcomers. The song from the film "Maanikya Malaraya Poovi" was released on YouTube and included Varrier winking. Her wink went viral and became an overnight sensation.

In 2019, she sang a song "Nee Mazhavillu Polen", with Naresh Iyer for the film Finals. She was cast in the Hindi film Sridevi Bungalow alongside Arbaaz Khan, which was languishing in post-production as of January 2020, due to criticism and lawsuits filed by late actress Sridevi's family. The film has not been released yet.

She made her Telugu debut with Check (2021) in which she played a honey trapper opposite Nithin and Rakul Preet Singh. Her first Kannada film Vishnupriya released in the year 2025.

In 2025, Varrier made her Tamil debut with Nilavuku En Mel Ennadi Kobam. Directed by Dhanush, she played the role Preethi. This was followed by her standout role as Nithya in Ajith Kumar's Good Bad Ugly, earning a significant career boost, marked by positive reception and renewed attention. Her recreation of the iconic song "Thottu Thottu Pesum Sultana" went viral and her portrayal has resonated well with audiences.

== Filmography ==
=== Films ===
Key
†	Denotes films that have not yet been released

Year	Title	Role	Language	Notes	Ref.
2018	Thanaha	Girl at bus station	Malayalam	Cameo appearance in the song "Mele Shoonyagasham"	
2019	Oru Adaar Love	Priya Varrier	Malayalam		
2021	Check	Yatra / Isabel	Telugu		
2021	Ishq: Not A Love Story	Anasuya "Anu"	Telugu		
2022	4 Years	Gayathri Arunkumar	Malayalam		
2023	Live	Anna	Malayalam		
2023	Kolla	Shilpa	Malayalam		
2023	Bro	Veena	Telugu		
2023	Yaariyan 2	Devi	Hindi	Cameo appearance	
2024	Mandakini	Akhila	Malayalam	Cameo appearance	
2025	Vishnu Priya	Priya	Kannada		
2025	Nilavuku En Mel Ennadi Kobam	Preethi	Tamil		
2025	Good Bad Ugly	Nithya	Tamil		
2025	Param Sundari	Extra in crowd	Hindi	Uncredited Extra	
2025	Sarvam Maya	Delulu on "flight mode"	Malayalam	Cameo Appearance	
TBA	3 Monkeys †	TBA	Hindi		
TBA	Love Hackers †	TBA	Hindi		

=== Web series ===
Key
†	Denotes television productions that have not yet been released

Year	Title	Role	Language	Platform	Ref.
2026	Cousins and Kalyanams		Malayalam	JioHotstar	

=== Short films ===
Year	Title	Role	Language	Notes	Ref.
2024	Subhadraharanam	Subhadra	Malayalam		

== Discography ==
Year	Song	Album	Language	Notes	Ref.
2019	"Nee Mazhavillu Polen"	Finals	Malayalam		
2021	"Ladi Ladi"	Ladi Ladi	Telugu	Music video	
2022	"Pennu"	Pennu	Malayalam	One minute music video	
2026	"War Cry"	Pallichattambi	Malayalam	Movie Promo Music Video	
