= Vineeth Sreenivasan filmography =

Sreenivasan's complete filmography

Vineeth Sreenivasan (born 1 October 1984) is an Indian actor, director, producer, dubbing artist, screenwriter, playback singer and lyricist who predominantly works in Malayalam cinema. He is the eldest son of actor and screenwriter Sreenivasan.

== As actor ==
Year	Title	Role	Notes	Ref.
2008	Cycle	Roy		
2009	Makante Achan	Manu		
2011	Traffic	Raihan		
2011	Chappa Kurishu	Ansari		
2012	Padmasree Bharat Dr. Saroj Kumar	Shyam		
2014	Om Shanti Oshana	Dr. Prasad Varkey		
2014	Ormayundo Ee Mukham	Gautham		
2015	Oru Vadakkan Selfie	Jack Tracker / Nivin		
2015	Oru Second Class Yathra	Nandu		
2015	Kunjiramayanam	Kunjiraman		
2016	Jacobinte Swargarajyam	Yusuf Shah		
2016	Oru Muthassi Gada	Zachariah		
2017	Aby	Aby		
2017	Oru Cinemakkaran	Alby		
2017	Aana Alaralodalaral	Hashim Jamaludeen		
2018	Aravindante Athidhikal	Aravindan		
2018	Naam	Himself	Special appearance	
2019	Thanneer Mathan Dinangal	Ravi Padmanabhan		
2019	Love Action Drama	Suman / Rohan		
2019	Manoharam	Manoharan / Manu		
2019	Helen	Kanchan	Cameo appearance	
2021	Sara'S	Himself	Cameo appearance	
2021	Kunjeldho	Junior Doctor	Cameo appearance	
2022	Mukundan Unni Associates	Adv. Mukundan Unni		
2023	Thankam	Kannan		
2023	Corona Papers	Musthafa		
2023	Pookkaalam	Judge Ravi		
2023	2018	Rameshan		
2023	Kurukkan	Dinesh K.T		
2024	Varshangalkku Shesham	Venu's taxi driver	Cameo appearance	
2025	Oru Jaathi Jathakam	Jayesh		
2025	Bha Bha Ba	Noble Joseph		
2026	Madhuvidhu	Aanjilimoottil Arumughan Kartha	Cameo appearance	
2026	Athiradi	Himself		
2026	Mollywood Times	Harris Basheer		

== As director and screenwriter ==
Year	Title	Credited as		Notes
Year	Title	Director	Writer	Notes
2010	Malarvaadi Arts Club	Yes	Yes	
2012	Thattathin Marayathu	Yes	Yes	
2013	Thira	Yes	No	
2015	Oru Vadakkan Selfie	No	Yes	
2016	Jacobinte Swargarajyam	Yes	Yes	
2021	Kunjeldho	No	No	Creative Director
2022	Hridayam	Yes	Yes	Kerala State Film Award for Best Film with Popular Appeal and Aesthetic Value
2024	Varshangalkku Shesham	Yes	Yes	
2025	Karam	Yes	No	Also producer

== As producer ==
Year	Title	Co-Producers	Notes			
Year	Title	Co-Producers	Notes	2011	Eli - a sexy tale	Tamil short film directed by Alphonse Puthren
2016	Aanandam					
2019	Helen	Noble Babu Thomas	National Film Award for Best Debut Film of a Director			

== As dubbing artist ==
Year	Title	Dubbed For	Character	Notes
2006	Note Book	Skanda Ashok	Sooraj Menon	
2008	Positive	Skanda Ashok	Raju	

== As narrator ==
Year	Title	Notes
2012	Jawan of Vellimala	
2014	Samsaaram Aarogyathinu Haanikaram	
2017	Godha	
2019	Adhyarathri	

== Frequent collaborations ==
Editor Ranjan Abraham has worked on all 6 films while music composer Shaan Rahman has worked in 4 films. Actor Aju Varghese have worked on five movies. Nivin Pauly and Deepak Parambol have acted in four films. Cinematographer Jomon T. John has worked in 3 films.

Artist	Role	Malarvaadi Arts Club	Thattathin Marayathu	Thira	Jacobinte Swargarajyam	Hridayam	Varshangalkku Shesham	Karam	Total
Ranjan Abraham	Editor	Yes	Yes	Yes	Yes	Yes	Yes	Yes	7
Shaan Rahman	Music director	Yes	Yes	Yes	Yes			Yes	5
Shaan Rahman	Actor						Yes		1
Aju Varghese	Actor	Yes	Yes		Yes	Yes	Yes		5
Aju Varghese	Assistant director				Yes				1
Nivin Pauly	Actor	Yes	Yes		Yes		Yes		4
Jomon T. John	Cinematographer		Yes	Yes	Yes			Yes	4
Deepak Parambol	Actor	Yes	Yes	Yes			Yes		4
Sreeram Ramachandran	Actor	Yes	Yes				Yes		3
Bhagath Manuel	Actor	Yes	Yes				Yes		3
Harikrishnan	Actor	Yes					Yes		2
Sreenivasan	Actor	Yes	Yes						2
Dinesh Prabhakar	Actor		Yes		Yes				2
Dinesh Prabhakar	Casting director			Yes	Yes				2
Dhyan Sreenivasan	Actor			Yes			Yes		2
Anu Elizabeth Jose	Lyricist		Yes	Yes					2
Noble Babu Thomas	Producer				Yes				1
Noble Babu Thomas	Actor					Yes		Yes	2
Pranav Mohanlal	Actor					Yes	Yes		2
Kalyani Priyadarshan	Actor					Yes	Yes		2
Kalesh Ramanand	Actor					Yes	Yes		2
Aswath Lal	Actor					Yes	Yes		2
Visakh Subramaniam	Producer					Yes	Yes	Yes	3
Viswajith Odukkathil	Cinematographer					Yes	Yes		2
Ajay Mangad	Art director	Yes	Yes	Yes					3
