= Aju Varghese filmography =

Aju Kurian Varghese (born 11 January 1985), known as Aju Varghese, is an Indian actor, Producer, Singer and Distributor who appears in Malayalam cinema. He made his debut in 2010 in Malarvadi Arts Club, directed by his college classmate Vineeth Sreenivasan.

== Films ==
Year	Title	Role	Notes
2010	Malarvaadi Arts Club	Kuttu	
2011	Manikya Kallu	Former student	Cameo appearance
2011	Sevenes	Arun	
2011	Doctor Love	Omanakuttan	
2012	Mayamohini	Vishnu Narayan Namboothiri	
2012	Thattathin Marayathu	Abdu	
2012	Bhoopadathil Illatha Oridam	Shihab	
2012	Chapters	Kanu	
2013	Kili Poyi	Hari	
2013	Bharya Athra Pora	Jilan	
2013	Paisa Paisa	Balu	
2013	Buddy	Rahul Kulkarni	
2013	Olipporu	Gear	
2013	Daivathinte Swantham Cleetus	Chinnan	
2013	Zachariayude Garbhinikal	Aju	
2013	Punyalan Agarbattis	Greenu Sharma	
2013	Bicycle Thieves	Shajan	Cameo appearance
2014	Ohm Shanthi Oshaana	David Kaanjaani	
2014	Pakida	Maathan/CP	
2014	Polytechnic	Backer	
2014	Ring Master	Peter	
2014	Pianist	Arfas Amar	
2014	Monayi Angane Aanayi	Monai	
2014	Peruchazhi	Vayalar Varkey	
2014	Vellimoonga	Tony Vaagathanam/Paachan	
2014	Ormayundo Ee Mukham	Apoorva	
2014	Lal Bahudur Shastri	Dharaman Shastri	
2014	Mathai Kuzhappakkaranalla	unnamed character	Cameo appearance
2014	Actually	Blog Kavi Saji	
2015	Mariyam Mukku	Lloyd Casper Anderson	
2015	Aadu	Ponnappan	Cameo appearance
2015	Namasthe Bali	Chandy Kariya / Chandikunju	
2015	100 Days of Love	Romanch Ramakrishnan	
2015	Oru Vadakkan Selfie	Shaji	
2015	Lavender	Raju	
2015	Lokha Samastha	Anoop	
2015	KL 10 Patthu	Faizal	
2015	Rasputin	Gopalan	
2015	Loham	Auto driver	Cameo appearance
2015	Jamna Pyari	Rameshan	
2015	Kunjiramayanam	Kuttan	
2015	Urumbukal urangarilla	Babutten	
2015	Kohinoor	Aandy Kunju	
2015	Ben	Allan	
2015	Su.. Su... Sudhi Vathmeekam	Greygon Das	
2015	Adi Kapyare Kootamani	Bruno	
2015	Two Countries	Avinash	
2016	Puthiya Niyamam	Romanch	
2016	Hello Namasthe	Pappu Joseph	
2016	Jacobinte Swargarajyam	Abdul Rahman	Also assistant director
2016	Mudhugauv	Bruno	Cameo appearance
2016	Oru Murai Vanthu Parthaya	Manoj Jyotsyan	
2016	Shajahanum Pareekuttiyum	Major E Ravi	
2016	Ann Maria Kalippilaanu	Ambrose	
2016	Pretham	Denny Kokkan	
2016	Oppam	Mala Babu	
2016	Kochavva Paulo Ayyappa Coelho	Rajeev	
2016	Welcome to Central Jail	Pranchi	
2016	Ore Mukham	Das	
2017	Aby	Kunjuttan	
2017	Alamara	Suvin	
2017	Sathya	Boban	
2017	Rakshadhikari Baiju Oppu	Unni	
2017	Ramante Edanthottam	Shathru	
2017	Adventures of Omanakuttan	Shiva Annan	
2017	Godha	Balan	
2017	Careful	Aneesh Abraham	
2017	Avarude Raavukal	Vinod Mannarkadu	
2017	Basheerinte Premalekhanam	Sulaiman	
2017	Bobby	Jimmy	
2017	Oru Visheshapetta BiriyaniKissa	Angel	Cameo appearance
2017	Lavakusha	Kusha	
2017	Vishwa Vikhyatharaya Payyanmar	Jithin Lal	
2017	Villain	Churutt Kannappi	
2017	Goodalochana	Prakashan	
2017	Punyalan Private Limited	Greenu Sharma	
2017	Chembarathipoo	Mathayi	
2017	Paipin Chuvattile Pranayam	Syam	
2017	Aadu 2	Ponnappan	Cameo appearances
2018	Hey Jude	George Kurian	Cameo appearances
2018	Kuttanadan Marpappa	Rev Fr. Innachan	
2018	Mohanlal	Aluva Aamod	
2018	Aravindante Athidhikal	Rasheed	
2018	B. Tech	Mutta Manoj	
2018	Njan Marykutty	RJ Alwin Henry	
2018	Ennalum Sarath..?	Singer at Party	Cameo appearance
2018	Iblis	Rajavu	Cameo appearance
2018	Dakini	Kuttappi	
2018	Vallikudilile Vellakaaran	Father Shibumon K.K	Cameo appearance
2018	Pretham 2	Denny Kokkan	Cameo appearance
2019	Vijay Superum Pournamiyum	YouTube Cleetus	Cameo appearance
2019	Neeyum Njanum	Abbas	
2019	Panthu	Pottukuthi Maash	
2019	June	Binoy Varkala	Cameo appearance
2019	Kodathi Samaksham Balan Vakeel	Anzar Ali Khan	
2019	Madhura Raja	Suru	
2019	Subharathri	George	Cameo appearance
2019	Marconi Mathai	Britto	
2019	Sachin	Jerry	100th film
2019	Love Action Drama	Sagar	
2019	Ittymaani: Made in China	Sugunan	
2019	Adhyarathri	Kunjumon	
2019	Helen	Ratheesh Kumar	
2019	Kamala	Safar	
2019	My Santa	Joji Varghese	Cameo appearance
2020	Uriyadi	Ambili	
2021	Sajan Bakery Since 1962	Bobin / Sajan	
2021	Tsunami	Antony a.k.a. Andy	
2021	Sara's	Lissy's husband	Cameo appearance
2021	Home	Prasad	Cameo appearance
2021	Minnal Murali	PC Siby Pothan	
2021	Oru Thathvika Avalokanam	Sakhavu Chandran	
2022	Meppadiyan	Thadathil Xavier	
2022	Hridayam	Jimmy	
2022	Jack N' Jill	Dr.Subramanian	
2022	Prakashan Parakkatte	Musthafa	
2022	Santacruz	Fernandez	
2022	Ullasam	Sam	
2022	Sayanna Varthakal	Jithu Joseph	
2022	Kudukk 2025	Leo	
2022	Jaya Jaya Jaya Jaya Hey	Karthikeyan	
2022	Saturday Night	Poocha Sunil	
2022	Vivaaha Aavahanam	Jesus	
2022	Veekam	Martin	
2022	Aanandam Paramanandam	Gopi	
2023	Khali Purse of Billionaires	Bibin Das	
2023	2018	Koshy	
2023	Article 21	Sakhavu Balan	
2023	Pappachan Olivilanu	Monichan	
2023	Nadhikalil Sundari Yamuna	Vidhyadharan	
2023	Phoenix	Adv. John Williams	
2023	A Ranjith Cinema	Murugan	
2023	Thaal		
2024	Oru Sarkar Ulpannam	Adv. Joshua Pallan	
2024	Varshangalkku Shesham	Kamukara Keshavadev / Jayan Keshavadev	
2024	Guruvayoor Ambalanadayil	Singer at temple	Cameo appearance
2024	DNA	Das	
2024	Gaganachari	Vibe	
2024	Nunakuzhi	Ranjith	
2024	Thaanara	CI James Bond	
2024	Virunnu	Praveen	
2024	Ajayante Randam Moshanam	SI Saifudheen	
2024	Thrayam	Faizi	
2024	Anand Sreebala	Ayyappan	
2024	Swargam	Josekutty	
2024	Hello Mummy	Boss	
2025	Identity	DYSP Dinesh Chandran	
2025	The Secret of Women	Melbin	
2025	Daveed	Sam Puthekkadan	
2025	Aap Kaise Ho	Police officer	
2025	Padakkuthira	Nandakumar	
2025	Nancy Rani	Dr. Iype Ibraham	
2025	Paranthu Po	Gunasekhar	Tamil film
2025	Dheeram		
2025	Sarvam Maya	Roopesh Namboothiri	
2025	Aghosham	Jumbo Suni	
2026	Pennu Case	Suresh	
2026	Aadu 3	Koran (past timeline)	
2026	Vaazha II: Biopic of a Billion Bros	Manoj Sir	
2026	Karuppu	Doctor	Tamil film; uncredited cameo
2026	Pluto	Tiger Thambi	
2026	Lurk	Aloshi	
2027	Operation Ganga †	TBA	

== Web series ==
Key
†	Denotes television productions that have not yet been released

Year	Title	Role	Release	Notes
2018	Thera Para	Adv. Prahlad Iyyer	YouTube	
2020	Mom and Son	Himself	YouTube	
2020	Kili	Psycho Security	YouTube	
2023	Kerala Crime Files	SI Manoj	Disney+ Hotstar	
2024	Perilloor Premier League	Psycho Balachandran	Disney+ Hotstar	
2025	Love Under Construction	Padmarajan	Disney+ Hotstar	
2025	Kerala Crime Files 2	CI Manoj	Disney+ Hotstar	

== Television ==
Year	Title	Role	Channel	Notes
2018	Kasthooriman	Himself	Asianet	TV series; Special appearance in episodes 95 & 96
2020	Kudumbavilakku	Himself	Asianet	TV series; Special appearance in Episode 205
2020	Kuttypattalam	Co-host	Surya TV	Christmas special
2021	Vishu Dhamaka	Co-host	Asianet	
2021	Super Power	Mentor	Flowers TV	
2023	Cook With Comedy	Guest	Asianet	
2023	Geeta Govindam	Himself	Asianet	TV series; Special appearances in episodes 89 and 90
2024	Oru Kodi With Comedy	Contestant	Flowers TV	

== Producer ==
- Love Action Drama (2019)
- Mom and Son (Web series -2020)
- Kili (Web series -2020)
- Saajan Bakery Since 1962 (2021)
- Prakashan Parakkatte (2022)

== Distributor ==
- Love Action Drama (2019)
- Helen (2019)
- Gauthamante Radham (2020)
- Saajan Bakery since 1962 (2021)
- Philip’s (2023)

== Voice roles ==
Year	Film	Role
2017	Role Models	Kiran
2019	Jimmy Ee Veedinte Aishwaryam	Jimmy
2021	Sunny	Kozhi Rajesh
2022	12th Man	Sajish
2023	Valatty	Poovan
2024	Malayalee from India	Muafaq
2024	Adios Amigo	Rajesh

== Discography ==
Year	Song	Film	Composer	Ref.
2024	"K for Krishna"	Guruvayoor Ambalanadayil	Ankit Menon	
2024	"Tharavadi Atrocity" (Promo Song)	Bharathanatyam	Samuel Aby	
