= Visakh Subramaniam =

Indian film producer, distributor, exhibitor

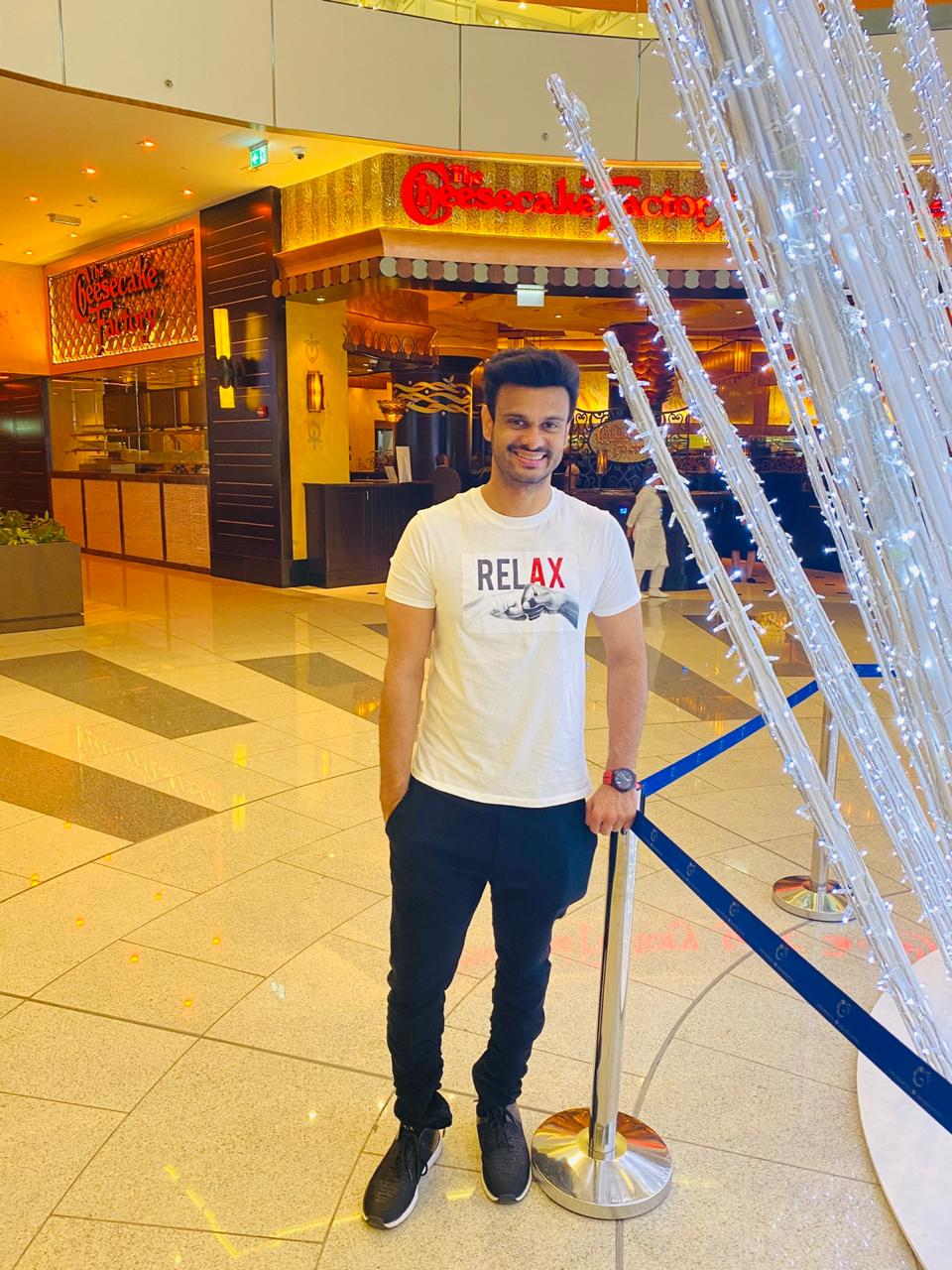
- Visakh in 2020
- Occupations: Film producer; film distributor; film exhibitor
- Years active: 2011–present
- Spouse: Advaita Srikanth (m. 2022)
- Relatives: P. Subramaniam (grandfather)

Visakh Subramaniam is an Indian film producer, distributor and exhibitor who works in the Malayalam film industry. He is the grandson of P. Subramaniam who founded Merryland Studio, the second film studio in Kerala. He is a partner of the production company Funtastic Films along with actors Aju Varghese and Dhyan Sreenivasan, and he is currently the managing director of the Merryland Cinemas production company.

== Career ==
Visakh made his entry as a film exhibitor in 2011, the same time when Vineeth Sreenivasan, Aju Varghese and Dhyan Sreenivasan made their debuts. He first met Vineeth and Aju during the release of Thattathin Marayathu (2012). With time he also met Dhyan Sreenivasan and their bond strengthened leading to collaboration plans.

On the release day of Vineeth's directorial Jacobinte Swargarajyam (2016), Dhyan narrated the script of Love Action Drama to Visakh. Aju Varghese was the film's sole producer then. Later Dhyan asked Visakh if he was interested in producing the film along with Aju, upon which he agreed. It was then Funtastic Films was formed and Visakh considers it as the boldest decision of his life. His debut production Love Action Drama starring Nivin Pauly and Nayanthara released on 5 September 2019 and opened to positive reports. The film grossed ₹50 crore at the box office and completed 100 days in Kerala. He then ventured into film distribution and distributed Helen under his banner Funtastic Films. In 2020, he was involved in the distribution of Gauthamante Radham starring Neeraj Madhav. In 2021, he produced Saajan Bakery Since 1962 starring Aju Varghese. Hridayam directed by Vineeth Sreenivasan marked the return of Merryland Studio through Visakh. The studio founded by his grandfather P. Subramaniam made a comeback after a hiatus of 40 years. Hridayam was released in theatres worldwide on 21 January 2022. The film received generally positive reviews from critics and grossed over ₹50 crores worldwide, becoming the 3rd highest grossing Malayalam film of the year. He produced Varshangalkku Shesham in 2024, which was a commercial success, grossing over ₹80 crores at the worldwide box office. He is currently producing Karam, his third film as a producer with Vineeth Sreenivasan, which is scheduled to be released in theatres on 25 September 2025.

== Filmography ==
- All the films are produced by Visakh, unless mentioned otherwise.

Key
†	Denotes films that have not yet been released

List of Visakh Subramaniam film credits
Year	Title	Director	Starring	Role/Notes
2019	Love Action Drama	Dhyan Sreenivasan	Nivin Pauly, Nayanthara, Aju Varghese	Producer
2019	Helen	Mathukutty Xavier	Anna Ben, Lal, Noble Babu Thomas, Aju Varghese	Distributor
2020	Gauthamante Radham	Anand Menon	Neeraj Madhav, Renji Panicker	Distributor
2020	Mom and Son	Kaarthik Shankar	Kaarthik Shankar, Aju Varghese	Comedy Series on YouTube
2020	Kili	Vishnu Govindan	Vishak Nair, Kaarthik Shankar, Aju Varghese	Comedy Series on YouTube
2020	Saajan Bakery Since 1962	Arun Chandu	Aju Varghese, Grace Antony	Producer
2022	Hridayam	Vineeth Sreenivasan	Pranav Mohanlal, Kalyani Priyadarshan	Producer
2022	Prakashan Parakkatte	Shahad	Dileesh Pothan, Mathew Thomas, Saiju Kurup, Aju Varghese, Dhyan Sreenivasan	Producer
2024	Varshangalkku Shesham	Vineeth Sreenivasan	Pranav Mohanlal, Kalyani Priyadarshan, Vineeth Sreenivasan, Nivin Pauly, Dhyan Sreenivasan, Aju Varghese, Basil Joseph, Neeraj Madhav, Neeta Pillai, Arjun Lal, Nikhil Nair, Shaan Rahman	Producer
2025	Karam	Vineeth Sreenivasan	Noble Babu Thomas	Producer
