= Philip's (film) =

2023 Indian film

- Theatrical release poster
- Directed by: Alfred Kurian Joseph
- Written by: Mathukutty Xavier; Alfred Kurian Joseph
- Produced by: Suvin K. Varkey; Prasobh Krishna
- Starring: Mukesh; Noble Babu Thomas; Innocent; Navani Devanand; Quinn Vipin; Charle
- Cinematography: Jaison Jacob John
- Edited by: Nidhin Raj Arol
- Music by: Hesham Abdul Wahab
- Production company: Little Big Films
- Distributed by: Funtastic Films
- Release date: 1 December 2023
- Running time: 108 minutes
- Country: India
- Language: Malayalam

Philip's is a 2023 Indian Malayalam-language family drama film directed by Alfred Kurian Joseph in his directorial debut. The film stars Mukesh in the title role, alongside Noble Babu Thomas and Charle. The film marks the final appearance of actor Innocent and is touted as the 300th film of Mukesh.

Principal photography began in January 2022 and was completed in Bangalore and Kochi. The music was composed by Hesham Abdul Wahab.

Philip's was released in India on 1 December 2023 and received positive reviews from critics.

== Plot ==
Philip, a middle-aged widower from Kerala, works at a sports retail shop in Bangalore while raising his three children: Basil, Blessy, and Betty. Basil, the elder, is a young IT professional who aspires to pursue his culinary course in New Zealand with his girlfriend, Dona. Despite living in the same building, Basil hesitates to reveal his plans to his father due to fear of his reaction.

Blessy, the second, is a 12th grader with a passion for skateboarding, who gets caught with chits during an exam, leading to a connection with Vivek, a fellow student. Betty, the youngest, enjoys playing chess and even places bets with classmates. During a school sports event, tragedy strikes when Vivek accidentally injures Betty in a shot put competition, resulting in her comatose state.

Devastated by Betty's condition, Philip takes legal action against the school for negligence. The legal battle puts a financial strain on Philip, but he finds support from his friend, Mani. Vivek's mental health deteriorates, prompting him to seek counseling.

As the case progresses in Philip's favor, three months pass, and financial difficulties continue to mount. Basil's relationship with Philip strains when he advises his father to prioritize Betty over the legal battle. Philip, however, pays no heed to Basil's advice. Senthil, Vivek's father, requests Philip to let go of Vivek from the case, but Philip denies the request.

Philip is forced to go on a 4-day business trip due to excess leaves. In his absence, Blessy undergoes a change, spending more time with Betty. Basil decides to leave his job after a work-related mix-up and chooses to seriously pursue his dream in New Zealand, following Mani's advice.

Upon Philip's return, a moment with Betty leads to his realization of the impact of his actions. He decides to back off from the legal battle, forgives Vivek, and mends his relationship with Basil and Blessy. Betty gradually regains consciousness. Basil confirms his decision to go to New Zealand with Dona, Blessy chooses to stay in Bangalore for her degree, and Philip and Betty decide to move back to Kerala.

== Cast ==
- Mukesh as Philip Abraham
- Noble Babu Thomas as Basil Philip
- Navani Devanand as Blessy Philip
- Quinn Vipin as Betty Philip
- Innocent as Mani Uncle
- Charle as Senthil
- Asha Madathil as Ancy
- Sreedhanya as Asha
- Ajit Koshy as Dr. Anil Naresh
- Ansha Mohan as Dona
- Sacchin Nachi as Vivek Senthil

== Production ==
=== Development ===
After the 2019 film Helen, director Mathukutty Xavier, Alfred Kurian Joseph and Noble Babu Thomas teamed again for Philip's, with Mukesh in the lead, his 300th film. The film also marks the directorial debut of Alfred Kurian Joseph.

=== Casting ===
The casting call for the film was a success and actors Navani Devanand as Blessy Philip and Quinn Vipin as Bitty Philip were selected.

=== Filming ===
Principal photography of the film started on 14 January 2022 at different locations in Bangalore and Kochi.

== Music ==
The original soundtrack and songs were composed by Hesham Abdul Wahab, who is known for Hridayam (2022).

== Release ==
The original release date for the film was set for 24 November 2023 and it was later rescheduled for 1 December 2023. The lead actor Mukesh announced the release date through his social media handles.

== Reception ==
=== Critical response ===
Sanjith Sidhardhan of OTTPlay gave 3 out of 5 stars and wrote, "If you are a fan of feel-good family dramas that have the potential to move you, then Mukesh's Philip will not disappoint. This simple film, which is based on true events, keeps it real. You might not feel a rush of uplifting emotions at the end of it, but it will leave you with a smile." Vignesh Madhu of Cinema Express gave 3 out of 5 stars and wrote, "Philip's will perhaps be best remembered as a fitting swansong for Innocent. The late actor does what he does best—playing the good Samaritan."

A critic of Times Now gave 3 out of 5 stars and wrote, "As Philip's prepares to unfold its heartwarming narrative on the big screen, audiences can anticipate a cinematic experience that explores the intricacies of family relationships, sprinkled with humour and unexpected turns." A staff of Onmanorama wrote, "While the fun part of the movie, except for a few one-liners delivered by the two daughter characters, is ludicrously grotesque, the serious sequences are engrossing and nuanced."
