= Ivan Vukomanović =

Serbian footballer and manager

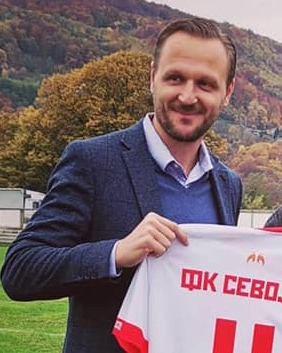
- Vukomanović in 2021

Personal information
- Date of birth: 19 June 1977 (age 49)
- Place of birth: Titovo Užice, SR Serbia, SFR Yugoslavia
- Height: 1.88 m (6 ft 2 in)
- Positions: Defender; defensive midfielder

Youth career
- Sloboda Užice

Senior career*
Years	Team	Apps	(Gls)
1994–1996	Sloboda Užice	34	(2)
1997–1998	Obilić	40	(4)
1998–2003	Bordeaux	9	(0)
1999–2000	→ Red Star Belgrade (loan)	23	(0)
2000	→ 1. FC Köln (loan)	2	(0)
2001	→ Red Star Belgrade (loan)	19	(0)
2002	→ Rad (loan)	15	(0)
2002–2003	→ Dynamo Moscow (loan)	14	(0)
2004	Alania Vladikavkaz	0	(0)
2005–2008	Lokeren	62	(4)
2008	→ Maccabi Herzliya (loan)	11	(2)
2008–2009	Royal Antwerp	19	(0)
2010	Qingdao Jonoon		
2011	Zandvliet Sport		
Total		248	(12)

International career
1998–2000	FR Yugoslavia U21	5	(1)

Managerial career
- 2013–2014: Standard Liège (assistant)
- 2014–2015: Standard Liège
- 2016–2017: Slovan Bratislava
- 2019: Apollon Limassol (interim)
- 2021–2024: Kerala Blasters
- 2026: NK Radomlje
- * Club domestic league appearances and goals

Ivan Vukomanović (Serbian Cyrillic: Иван Вукомановић; born 19 June 1977) is a Serbian professional football manager and former player who was the recently head coach of Slovenian PrvaLiga club NK Radomlje.

== Playing career ==
Vukomanović played as a defender during his playing days. He was also used as a defensive midfielder. He started his professional career at Serbian club FK Sloboda Užice. Vukomanović later played for Obilić, where he won the 1997–98 First League of FR Yugoslavia title. Vukomanović then moved to the Ligue 1 side Bordeaux. With the French club, he won the 1998–99 French Division 1. Throughout his career, he played for several top tier clubs, which includes the Serbian side Red Star Belgrade, Bundesliga’s FC Köln, Belgian side Royal Antwerp F.C. and Russian club FC Dynamo Moscow. With Red Star Belgrade, he had won the 1999–2000 and 2000–01 season of First League of FR Yugoslavia along with the FR Yugoslavia Cup in 2000. Vukamanovic fully retired from professional football in 2011 at the age of 34. At the national level, he had represented FR Yugoslavia national under-21 football team.

== Managerial career ==
=== Standard Liège ===
Vukomanović started his coaching career at Belgian Pro League club Standard Liège, where he assisted Guy Luzon ahead of the club's 2013-14 season. During this time, Liège played the Europa League after winning all the games in the qualifying stages. Following Luzon’s exit in October 2014, Vukomanović took charge as their head coach. His first game ever game as a head coach was against Spanish giants Sevilla in the Europa League, where the match ended in a goalless draw. Under his coaching, Standard Liege picked 28 out of a possible 39 points in the league. In February 2015, despite getting some good results, the club replaced him with Jose Riga midway into the season citing lack of experience as a head coach. He was offered the assistant manager role under Riga, to which he responded; "To propose to me to remain in the staff, it is only to be politically correct towards the players and the supporters. I could have been fake and say yes. Tap Riga on the shoulder and then do nothing but I'm not like that. I'm a straightforward, honest person. So I decided to leave Standard".

=== Slovan Bratislava ===
In 2016, Vukomanović was appointed as the manager of the Slovak Super Liga side Slovan Bratislava. Under his helm, the club finished second-place finish in the league. His first title as a manager came in 2017, where he guided Slovan Bratislava to the 2017–18 Slovak Cup title. Vukomanović had a decent second season Slovan Bratislava. With just five defeats from 22 games, he parted ways with the club following a draw against FK Senica on 28 October 2017.

=== Apollon Limassol ===
After a two year hiatus, Vukomanović returned to coaching in September 2019 by signing with Cypriot First Division club Apollon Limassol as their interim head coach and led them in four matches.

=== Kerala Blasters ===
==== 2021–22: Appointment and ISL finals ====
On 17 June 2021, Kerala Blasters announced that Vukomanović has been appointed as the Indian Super League club's new head coach ahead of the 2021–22 season. Under Vukomanović, Kerala Blasters won their first game of the season in the 2021 Durand Cup match against Indian Navy with a score of 0–1 on 11 September 2021. His first Indian Super League match as the manager of Kerala Blasters ended in 4–2 defeat on 19 November against ATK Mohun Bagan FC. The following two games saw Blasters drawing against NorthEast United FC and Bengaluru FC respectively.

It was on 5 December that Vukomanović's Blasters side saw their first league win as they defeated Odisha FC by 2–1 at full-time, and helped Kerala Blasters to seal their first Indian Super League victory in 11 months. The Blasters' then won back-to-back games against defending champions Mumbai City FC and against rivals Chennaiyin FC, and made it to the top four in the table. The Blasters' unbeaten streak under Vukomanović continued, and they moved to the top of the table for the first time in eight years during the mid-season after the 1–0 victory over Hyderabad FC on 9 January 2022.

Under his management, the Blasters qualified for the ISL finals for the first time since 2016 after beating Jamshedpur FC 2–1 on aggregate score from both legs. They faced Hyderabad in the final on 20 March, which they lost in penalty shoot-out. The club reached numerous milestones during the season including a 10-match unbeaten run which made them climb to the top of the table for the first time in its history. The Blasters also recorded its highest goals scored, highest points obtained, highest number of wins and least number of losses. They also achieved a positive goal difference for the first time in the club's history.

==== 2022–23: Contract extension ====
On 4 April, the club announced the contract extension of Vukomanović for three more years until 2025. It was the first time that the club has renewed the contract of a first-team head coach since its inception in 2014. The 2022–23 Indian Super League began on a high note with a 3–1 victory over SC East Bengal on 7 October 2022 which was also his first home game as the Blasters manager after the regular home-away format returned after the COVID-19 regulation. Despite this, the Blasters suffered three defeats in a row.

They came back to the winning ways after defeating NorthEast United FC 3–0 on 5 November in an away game. On 13 November, the Blasters broke FC Goa's unbeaten six year run against them after a 3–1 win. This also marked Vukomanović's 14th win as the manager of the Blasters and broke David James' record for most number of wins for the club. On 19 November, he became the first manager in the history of the club to record three consecutive win after defeating Hyderabad 1–0 in an away game.

In this season under Vukomanović, the Blasters won five consecutive matches for the first time in their history until they drew against Chennaiyin on 19 December. On 3 February 2023, Vukamanovic served his 42nd game as the manager of Kerala Blasters and broke David James' record of managing the most number of games for the club. On 7 February, the Blasters registered their 10th win during the 2022–23 Indian Super League season after defeating Chennaiyin FC 2–1 at home. This was the first time in their history that the club won 10 games in a season. On 16 February, the Blasters qualified for the 2022–23 season playoffs, making Vukamanovic the first manager in the club's history to lead them into consecutive playoffs.

On 3 March, the Blasters played against Bengaluru FC in the playoffs which was subjected to controversy. Sunil Chhetri scored a controversial free-kick goal in the 96th minute of extra time. Following the goal, the Blasters players walked-off the pitch after Vukomanović called them off from the pitch. Kerala Blasters forfeited the match after claiming that the referee Crystal John did not blow the whistle before Chhetri took the kick and the players were not ready in their defensive positions. The next day, Vukamanovic and the whole team received a warm welcome at the Kochi airport with the chants of “Ivan, Ivan,” and “we are with you”.

Kerala Blasters later alleged that the referee asked Luna to move away from the ball, and hence the free kick should have only been allowed following a whistle. The club also asked for a ban on the referee Crystal John. Later, Vukomanović was separately charged by the All India Football Federation's Disciplinary Committee for 'bringing the game into disrepute'. The AIFF DC that met on 31 March then imposed a 10-match ban along with a fine of 5 lakhs Indian rupees on Vukomanović for 'the abandonment and bringing the game into disrepute' under the Article 9.1.2 of the AIFF disciplinary code and directed Vukomanović to issue a public apology within a week, failing which the fine would be doubled to 10 lakhs Indian rupees. The 10-match ban meant that Vukomanović would not be permitted to be a part of the team's dressing room or the team bench as per the Article 9.1.6 of the disciplinary code in the next 10 matches of the AIFF held tournaments regardless of which team he is contracted with.

==== 2023–24: Final season ====
After serving his ten-match ban, Vukomanović made his come-back to Blasters' dugout as their head-coach in the 2023–24 Indian Super League season in the home game against Odisha FC on 27 October, where he was welcomed back by the fans with a tifo. The Blasters won the match 2–1, after coming back from one goal down and moved to second spot in the league table. On 11 December, Vukomanović was suspended for one-game ahead of the match against Punjab FC by the AIFF-DC and was imposed a fine of ₹50,000 following his comments against the referees in the post-match press conference after the match against Chennaiyin FC in late November. After the 1–0 away victory against Mohun Bagan SG on 27 December, Vukomanović became the first manager in Kerala Blasters' history, under whose tenure they defeated all the possible opponents in the ISL. It was also a third successive clean sheet victory for Vukomanovic’s side, the first time in club's history.

Despite a strong start to the season that saw the Blasters reach the top of the point table during the mid season, their performance steadily declined since the turn of the year. Injuries forced Vukomanović to alter his system and lineup throughout the Super Cup and the latter half of the season. The club has suffered a total number of 20 injuries in the season. They had eight defeats in ten games, including the playoff tie during the second half of the season. On 26 April 2024, Kerala Blasters announced that they have parted ways with Vukomanović. He left the club as its most successful head coach who also managed most number of games for them. He held a win percentage of 44.8% during his tenure with the Blasters, surpassing any previous manager in the club’s history. Vukomanovic has also achieved the highest points-per-game ratio (1.58) in the league stage for the Blasters. He also became the first Kerala Blasters FC head coach to qualify them for three consecutive playoffs. At the time of his departure, Vukomanovic was the only Kerala Blasters FC head coach to have a positive goal difference across his reign.

=== NK Radomlje ===
On 13 June 2026, Slovenian PrvaLiga club NK Radomlje announced Vukomanovic's arrival as the club's new head coach.

== Manager profile ==
=== Tactics ===
Vukomanović usually lines up his team in a 4-4-2 formation with two playmakers pushed outside and two high-pressing forwards, but the lineup would change slightly depending on who played where. He has also occasionally used other formations such as 4-3-3. Vukomanović frequently approaches his gameplay with an attacking philosophy. In his 4-4-2 formation, attacks are mostly launched through either flank with two midfielders playing as double pivots. The goalkeeper in Vukomanović's playing system needs to be a sweeper-keeper, because he needs to be involved in his team's passing. This formation lacks a playmaker in the midfield. Because of this, one of the two strikers playing up front needs to be able to drop back, hold the ball, and lay it off to the other striker to finish it. Additionally, one of the two double pivots must play as a defensive midfielder, while the other must play the offensive position and serve as a third striker. A team's offense and defense become automatically more effective as a result, and this aids in a team's ability to cover the most ground on the field.

== Managerial statistics ==
As of match played till 19 April 2024

Managerial record by team and tenure
Team	Nat	From	To	Record								Ref.
Team	Nat	From	To	G	W	D	L	GF	GA	GD	Win %	Ref.
Standard Liège	(Belgium)	20 October 2014	2 February 2015	18	9	2	7	23	24	−1	50.00	
Slovan Bratislava	(Slovakia)	2 August 2016	30 October 2017	57	33	10	14	107	57	+50	57.89	
Apollon Limassol	(Cyprus)	9 September 2019	3 October 2019	4	1	1	2	4	6	−2	25.00	
Kerala Blasters	(India)	17 June 2021	26 April 2024	76	33	14	29	115	105	+10	43.42	
NK Radomlje	(Slovenia)	13 June 2026	4 October 2026	9	1	2	6	8	16	−8	11.11	
Total				155	76	27	52	249	192	+57	49.03	

== Honours ==
=== Player ===
Obilić

- First League of FR Yugoslavia: 1997–98

Red Star Belgrade

- First League of FR Yugoslavia: 1999–2000, 2000–01
- FR Yugoslavia Cup: 1999–2000

Bordeaux

- Ligue 1: 1998–99

=== Manager ===
Slovan Bratislava

- Slovak Cup: 2017–18

Kerala Blasters

- Indian Super League runner-up: 2021–22

== Filmography ==
Vukomanović made his acting debut in the Vineeth Sreenivasan Malayalam film Karam.

Year	Title	Role	Notes	Ref.
2025	Karam	André Nicola	Antagonist, Debut Film	
