= Noble Babu Thomas =

Indian filmmaker (born 1984)

- Born: 30 May 1984 (age 42); Thiruvalla, Kerala, India
- Occupations: Film producer; screen writer; film actor
- Years active: 2016–present
- Spouse: Bonny Mary Mathew (m. 2013)

Noble Babu Thomas (born 30 May 1984) is an Indian film producer, screenwriter, and actor who works in Malayalam films. He started his career as a film producer and founded the film production company Big Bang Entertainments in 2015. His debut production was Jacobinte Swargarajyam (2016), starring Nivin Pauly and directed by Vineeth Sreenivasan.

Noble made his acting debut in Helen (2019), produced by Vineeth Sreenivasan. He was also one of its writers, along with Alfred Kurian Joseph and Mathukutty Xavier. The film was a survival thriller and his character Azhar was widely recognized. His debut directorial was the music video album titled Made in Heaven, in which he also played the lead role. He was the creative director of the movie Mili starring Janhvi Kapoor.

== Early life ==
Noble was born to Babu Thomas and Suma Babu in Thiruvalla, Kerala. He attended Sacred Heart Higher Secondary School, Thevara. He did his Bachelor's in Electrical and Electronics Engineering from KCG College of Technology, Chennai. It was during that time he met Vineeth Sreenivasan and Aju Varghese, who were his batchmates. During his college days he had a keen interest in acting and therefore got into modelling. He later graduated from Vogue Institute of Fashion Technology, Bangalore.

== Career ==
After founding Big Bang Entertainments in 2015, Noble's debut film production venture was Jacobinte Swargarajyam starring Nivin Pauly and directed by Vineeth Sreenivasan. The film went on to become a commercial success, grossing ₹25 crore (US$3.6 million) at the box office and completed 100 days in Kerala. In 2018, he co-produced Aravindante Athidhikal with Pradeep Kumar starring Vineeth Sreenivasan and directed by M. Mohanan. Noble's third production venture was Helen (2019) in which he marked his debut as an actor. The film was also his debut as a screenwriter, along with Alfred Kurian Joseph and Mathukutty Xavier. He co-produced the film along with Vineeth Sreenivasan's production company Habit of Life. His performance earned him positive reviews from critics; Litty Simon of Malayala Manorama said, "Noble makes his acting debut as Helen's lover and justifies his role in every aspect". Sajin Shrijith of The New Indian Express noted that Noble "makes a solid impression with his acting debut". In 2021, he turned director and starred in a music video album titled Made in Heaven. In 2022, he co-produced Hridayam starring Pranav Mohanlal and also appeared briefly in it. He has also served as creative director for the movie Mili starring Janhvi Kapoor which is the Bollywood remake of Helen. His next film Philp’s was announced in January 2022.

== Filmography ==
- Note: all films are in Malayalam, unless otherwise noted.

Year	Title	Producer	Screenwriter	Creative Director	Notes
2016	Jacobinte Swargarajyam	Yes	No	No	
2018	Aravindante Athidhikal	Yes	No	No	
2019	Helen	Yes	Yes	No	Debut as actor and screenwriter
2022	Hridayam	No	No	No	
2022	Mili	No	No	Yes	Hindi film
2022	Mukundan Unni Associates	No	No	No	Cameo appearance
2023	Philip's	No	No	No	
2025	Karam	No	Yes	No	

=== As an actor ===
Year	Title	Role	Notes
2019	Helen	Azhar	
2022	Hridayam	Vishak	
2022	Mukundan Unni Associates	DSP Sriram IPS	
2023	Philip's	Basil Philip	
2025	Karam	Dev Mahendran	
2025	Adavi	Unknown	Shortfilm, Preproduction in Progress
