= Karam (2025 film) =

2025 Indian-Malayalam language action film

- Theatrical release poster
- Directed by: Vineeth Sreenivasan
- Written by: Noble Babu Thomas
- Produced by: Visakh Subramaniam; Vineeth Sreenivasan
- Starring: Noble Babu Thomas; Ivan Vukomanović; Audrey Miriam Henest; Manoj K. Jayan; Reshma Sebastian
- Cinematography: Jomon T. John
- Edited by: Ranjan Abraham
- Music by: Shaan Rahman
- Production companies: Merryland Cinemas; Habit of Life
- Distributed by: Merryland Cinemas
- Release date: 25 September 2025
- Running time: 126 minutes
- Country: India
- Language: Malayalam

Karam (transl. Hand of God) is a 2025 Indian Malayalam-language action thriller film directed by Vineeth Sreenivasan and written by Noble Babu Thomas. The film stars Noble Babu Thomas, Ivan Vukomanovic, Audrey Miriam Henest, Reshma Sebastian, Manoj K. Jayan, Kalabhavan Shajohn, and Baburaj. It is produced by Visakh Subramaniam and Vineeth Sreenivasan under Merryland Cinemas and Habit of Life. The soundtrack is composed by Shaan Rahman.

Karam was released on 25 September 2025 to negative reviews from critics and audience who deemed it as the weakest film of Vineeth as a director and was a box-office bomb, making it as the biggest failure of Vineeth's career.

== Plot ==
Former Indian military officer Dev Mahendran and his family find themselves in a perilous situation in a foreign country, Lenarco, during an international conference.

== Cast ==
- Noble Babu Thomas as Dev Mahendran
- Ivan Vukomanović as André Nicola
- Manoj K. Jayan as Mahendran, Dev's father
- Audrey Miriam Henest as Sana Abdullah
- Reshma Sebastian as Thara
- Shweta Menon as Dr. Nandita Bose, Minister of External Affairs and Mahendran's ex-girlfriend
- Baburaj as Rosario
- Kalabhavan Shajohn as Kamal Muhammed
- Sudev Nair as Sinto
- Vishnu G. Varrier as Bato
- Johny Antony as Abdullah, Sana's father
- Redin Kingsley as Bhaskar
- Vineeth Vasudevan as Amrit
- Joji Mundakayam as Murali
- Nazhan Bin Najmal as Ayaan
- John Kaippallil as Salman Basheer
- Rimmi Singh as Sana's mother
- Vettai Muthukumar as Selvam

== Production ==
Filming took place across Georgia and along the borders of Russia and Azerbaijan. Filming also briefly took place in Shimla, Chandigarh and Kochi.

== Soundtrack ==
Karam

Film score by Shaan Rahman
- Released: September, 2025
- Genre: Film soundtrack
- Length: 9m 34s
- Label: Saregama

Shaan Rahman chronology
Written & Directed by God (2025)	Karam (2025)

The film's music is composed Shaan Rahman with the lyrics written by Vineeth Sreenivasan and Anu Elizabeth Jose. The music distribution rights have been acquired by Saregama.

=== Track listing ===
Karam Original music listing
No.	Title	Lyrics	Singer(s)	Length
1.	"Al Malik"	Vineeth Sreenivasan, Shaan Rahman	Harib Hussain, Anila Rajeev	2:53
2.	"Welcome to Lenarco"	Anu Elizabeth Jose	Harishankar K. S., Isabel George, Megisha, Annet Xavier, Arundathi P.	3:40
3.	"Uyarnnu Vaa"	Fejo, Vineeth Sreenivasan	Fejo, Vineeth Sreenivasan	3:01
Total length:				9:34

== Release ==
Karam was released in theatres on 25 September 2025, released in United Kingdom on 27 September 2025 and on 29 September 2025 in Ireland.

Karam was released on manoramaMAX OTT on 7 November 2025.

=== Distribution ===
Merryland Cinemas distributed the film in India. Phars Film acquired the overseas distribution rights.

== Reception ==
S.R. Praveen of The Hindu called the film "a staid, emotionally hollow film with nothing new to say". Anandu Suresh of The Indian Express gave 1 out of 5 stars, writing "If there's anything that has backfired as much as Vineeth Sreenivasan's direction and Noble Babu Thomas's writing, it's Shaan Rahman's music that has failed to do justice to the movie". Swathi P Ajith of Onmanorama observed that despite some strong performances, the film "struggles to hold attention and never rises above mediocrity". Vishal Menon of The Hollywood Reporter wrote "It’s not that one feels Vineeth is incapable of handling serious topics with real style. He’s done that in Thira before this and even in parts of Jacobinte Swargarajyam. But with Karam, he’s made a film that’s so out of his zone that we’re made to absorb the full weight of his discomfort. Of all the things you’d taken for granted in a Vineeth Sreenivasan film, heart or hridayam is strangely what’s missing most in Karam".

Anna Mathews of The Times of India gave 1.5 out of 5 stars, writing "It’s a shame that while the film does not skint on production values, the script and characters are so badly written that it is difficult to watch it unfold on screen". Vignesh Madhu of The New Indian Express gave 2 out of 5 stars, writing "Technically polished but narratively hollow, Karam is a thriller that forgets the thrill". Sanjith Sidhardhan of OTTplay gave 2.5 out of 5 stars, writing "Director Vineeth Sreenivasan’s latest movie Karam, despite minimal promotions, had fans hoping it would showcase a different side of his filmmaking, akin to his 2013 thriller Thira. The latter, despite receiving mixed reactions at the box office, has since become a cult hit, so it’s only natural that expectations for Karam were high. But does the film live up to them? Not quite".
