= Varshangalkku Shesham =

2024 Indian film by Vineeth Sreenivasan

- Theatrical release poster
- Directed by: Vineeth Sreenivasan
- Written by: Vineeth Sreenivasan
- Produced by: Visakh Subramaniam
- Starring: Nivin Pauly; Pranav Mohanlal; Dhyan Sreenivasan; Kalyani Priyadarshan
- Cinematography: Viswajith Odukkathil
- Edited by: Ranjan Abraham
- Music by: Amrit Ramnath
- Production company: Merryland Cinemas
- Distributed by: Merryland Release
- Release date: 11 April 2024
- Running time: 166 minutes
- Country: India
- Language: Malayalam
- Box office: est. ₹82.75 crore

Varshangalkku Shesham (transl. Years later) is a 2024 Indian Malayalam-language period comedy drama film written and directed by Vineeth Sreenivasan. It was produced by Visakh Subramaniam under Merryland Cinemas. The film stars Pranav Mohanlal and Dhyan Sreenivasan in the lead roles, alongside Nivin Pauly in an extended cameo appearance. It also stars Kalyani Priyadarshan, Aju Varghese, Neeta Pillai, Basil Joseph and Neeraj Madhav in supporting roles. It also has Vineeth Sreenivasan himself and Asif Ali making cameo appearance.The soundtrack and background score were composed by Amrit Ramnath.

Principal photography took place from October to December 2023, lasting 40 days. It was filmed across 50 locations in Kerala and Tamil Nadu. Viswajith Odukkathil and Ranjan Abraham handled the cinematography and editing, respectively.

The film was released worldwide in theatres on 11 April 2024 to mixed reviews from critics and audiences alike. The performances of Nivin, Dhyan and Pranav as well as the production design, soundtrack, and cinematography, were praised. However, the screenplay, pacing, and runtime received criticism. Despite this, the film was a commercial success, grossing over ₹80 crores at the worldwide box-office. It also emerged as the 9th highest grossing Malayalam film of 2024 and one of the highest-grossing Malayalam films.

== Plot ==
In the early 1970s, Venu is a high schooler who devotes all of his time to helping out in traveling plays when they stop in his hometown. One night, the producer of a play asks him to bring an instrumentalist, Murali, from the house of the local landlord. Drunk, Murali reluctantly agrees to play for the evening. Venu is thoroughly impressed with the man's spontaneous musicality and they quickly become friends. As time passes, Venu goes to college; Murali shows up there one day, trying to meet the principal to borrow a new book that has reached the college library. Venu offers to help and discovers that the book has already been lent to a first-year student named Annie. Murali, on meeting Annie, instantly falls in love with her. They meet that night to exchange the book and continue seeing each other. Murali asks her out, but is met with shock and rejection. She tells him to leave, revealing that she is sexually involved with her brother-in-law.

Murali is shattered by the news and disappears for a while. One day, he writes to Venu that he is leaving for Madras with the intention of making it in cinema; Venu decides to join him. They rent out a room in Kodambakkam where Murali lands a job as a violinist under music director Indra Dhanush. After playing the violin for a B-movie, Murali meets the producer of the film, Keshavadev. He tells him that his film will flop massively. After the film flops, Murali introduces Keshavadev to Venu, who has the script for a prospective film. He is impressed and agrees to produce it. Venu insists that Murali produce the music for it, but he refuses, citing his inexperience. Murali secretly passes on some of his music to Indra Dhanush, who goes on to compose music for the film. The film, upon release, becomes a huge success, with the song that Murali composed becoming a sensation. He is driven mad by the fact that he did not produce the music himself. He meets with Indra Dhanush, asking him to tell Venu that the song was his, but gets rejected. Murali goes to Venu's place. Venu chides him for coming there in an inebriated state, and about their respective statuses as promising director and minor background violinist. Murali leaves in tears, but leaves behind the original cassette with his name on it, containing the song. Finding it and realising the truth, Venu tries to meet Murali, but discovers that he has left Madras. Murali goes to Bombay where he works as a music teacher in a school. He falls in love with his colleague, Bhumi. At some point, they have a misunderstanding and break up. Murali leaves Bombay after the 1993 bombings, and vanishes.

Over the years, Venu directs many more films and then leaves the cinema industry. He tries to search for Murali in vain. One day, 50 years after the Madras incident, he meets Murali again by chance, who tells him to return to the film industry. He hesitatingly agrees, and asks Murali to produce the music for his film. Annie and her husband John convince Murali to accept. At (still remembered mainly for Murali's song) Indra Dhanush's funeral, they discover the young director Pradeep. Venu and Pradeep start looking for a crew to work on one of Venu's old scripts, Jeevithagaadhakale. They mostly cast new artists except for the eccentric actor, Nithin "Molly/Mollywood" Mulanthuruthy. At the end of filming, their producer, Keshavadev's son Jayan, falls seriously ill and is unable to continue bankrolling the film. Murali, disappointed, disappears again. They are miraculously saved by the paparazzi who filmed Nithin Molly in an inebriated state, swearing at the entire film industry for their treatment of him. This makes him popular and creates a hype for the film. Jeevithagaadhakale releases theatrically and gets outstanding reactions and reviews. During the premiere, Venu gets a call and leaves.

Venu hires a taxi to a location in Tamil Nadu where he meets Senthil, an old friend from Madras. He directs Venu to Karpagam, a village near Salem, where Murali lives in a Carnatic music sabha. Venu tells him that their first movie as a duo has released, to Murali's delight. They go to a theatre in Coimbatore to see how the audience reacts to their film.

== Cast ==
- Pranav Mohanlal as Murali Vishwambaran
- Dhyan Sreenivasan as Venu Koothuparambu
- Nivin Pauly as Nithin Mulanthuruthy aka Nithin Molly (extended cameo appearance)
- Kalyani Priyadarshan as Annie, Murali's ex-girlfriend, John's wife (voiceover by Raveena Ravi)
- Neeta Pillai as Radhika, Venu's wife
- Aju Varghese in dual role as :
  - Keshadev
  - Jayan Keshadev
- Basil Joseph as Pradeep
- Vineeth Sreenivasan as Venu's driver (cameo appearance)
- Neeraj Madhav as 'Fearless' Alex Mathew
- Shaan Rahman as Kamaraj
- Y. G. Mahendran as Swaminathan, Swami's lodge owner
- Kalesh Ramanand as Indradhanush, a music director
- Arjun Lal as Christy, Annie's brother-in-law
- Deepak Parambol as Shakespeare Shekharan
- TSR Srinivasan as Ilango, an art director
- Hesham Abdul Wahab as a playback singer (cameo appearance)
- Visakh Subramaniam as a film director (cameo appearance)
- Asif Ali as John, Annie's husband (cameo appearance)

== Production ==
=== Development ===
On 13 July 2023, Vineeth Sreenivasan announced he was again collaborating with producer Visakh Subramaniam of Merryland Cinemas, following the success of Hridayam (2022), for their second project together, to be titled Varshangalkku Shesham. The film brought back Pranav Mohanlal and Kalyani Priyadarshan from their previous film. Vineeth described the film will as revolving around a bunch of friends.

In an interview, talking about his influences, Vineeth recalled how he listened to his father Sreenivasan's stories about his early life in Madras and also the experiences of his contemporaries in the film industry. During his school days, Vineeth avidly read popular Malayalam film magazines, such as Nana, Vellinakshatram, and Chithrabhumi, which featured articles and interviews with those working in cinema. These stories, along with the imagined picture of Madras they presented, served as inspirations for Varshangalkku Shesham. He also recalled how, during stage shows, actors Mukesh and Innocent would entertain the team with anecdotes from their lives in Madras and their experiences in the cinema world. Vineeth himself being a resident of Chennai (formerly Madras), describes the city as "a place that had always fascinated" him. Varshangalkku Shesham features Madras in the 1970s and 1980s, spanning 50 years from early 1970s, showcasing the evolution of the film industry during this period; the film "attempts to showcase that arc of time, the mood and the style of working".

Vineeth had the story in mind since his college days but lacked the confidence to execute it. After Hridayam, he gained the confidence to bring it to fruition. He began screenwriting in 2022. Vineeth revealed that the story of Varshangalkku Shesham was inspired by two screenplays written by Sreenivasan. Vineeth also integrated input from director Priyadarshan, with whom he shared the screenplay. Priyadarshan narrated an incident that occurred in a film studio, which Vineeth incorporated into the film.

=== Casting ===
During the film's announcement, the initial cast included Pranav Mohanlal, Dhyan Sreenivasan, Aju Varghese, Kalyani Priyadarshan, Basil Joseph, Vineeth, Neeraj Madhav, Neeta Pillai, Sai Aadya Bhumi, Arjun Lal, Nikhil Nair, Shaan Rahman, and Nivin Pauly.

Vineeth had Pranav, Dhyan, and Nivin in mind during the scripting phase itself. According to Vineeth, the film will not work without these three. About Kalyani's casting, he said: "Everyone suggested Kalyani after listening to the story". Vineeth based Pranav's character after actor Murali, whom he observed during the filming of Champakulam Thachan in 1992. He recalls seeing Murali walking towards their hotel from a distance, dressed in a jubba and mundu, with a sling bag on his shoulder, while singing a poem. Vineeth described the characterisation as "a man flowing in the wind". He also named the character after the actor. The film marks the reunion of Pranav and Kalyani with Vineeth after Hridayam. Dhyan underwent a weight loss of 12 kilograms to prepare for his role in the film.

Shaan, who previously collaborated with Vineeth as a music director in his earlier projects, made his acting debut with Varshangalkku Shesham. Although Vineeth had previously approached Shaan for a brief role in Thira (2013), he declined it. However, he accepted this offer, influenced by Vineeth's confidence in him. Shaan underwent a makeover, donning an outfit, wig, and mustache for his role. Vineeth had approached director Lokesh Kanagaraj for a role as he wanted a "Tamil-speaking actor with a calm demeanour", but Kanagaraj declined due to his directorial commitments. Consequently, Kalesh Ramanand, who had previously appeared in Hridayam, was chosen for the role, having been suggested by Visakh.

Vineeth reminisced about how several actors in the film juggled shooting dates with multiple filmmakers, unlike in Hridayam, where most of them were early in their careers. He described it as "a wonderful coincidence that we were able to bring them all together for this film".

=== Filming ===
Principal photography began on 26 October 2023. The following day, filming was relocated to Aroor. The film's art director, Nimesh Thanur, constructed sets at Aroor, replicating Kodambakkam and film studios of Madras. Additionally, some studio scenes were shot in Coimbatore and Pollachi. It took two months to build the sets. Vineeth said that director Priyadarshan provided some important details in the design of Swami's Lodge, one of the major backdrops of the film, when he narrated the screenplay to him.

The first filming period was concluded in the fourth week of November 2023 after 23 days of filming. Nivin joined the film for the second filming period in Munnar in early December. The entire filming process wrapped up on 20 December 2023. The film used more than 50 locations, and involved over 200 crew members. Although the film depicts Chennai in the 1970s and 1980s, it was not shot in Chennai.

=== Post-production ===
Dubbing for the film commenced in early January 2024 in Chennai. The dubbing process was completed the same month. It was followed by the final stage of editing, which occurred during the same month. The audio mixing of the film was completed by March 2024.

== Music ==
Varshangalkku Shesham marks the debut feature film composition work of Amrit Ramnath, the son of singer-composer Bombay Jayashri. Ramnath started composing for the film while he was at the hospital (his mother was ill) and composed three tracks during the period. Manu Manjith, Vaisakh Sugunan, Jayashri, and Sreenivasan wrote the lyrics. Think Music released the film's soundtrack album on 7 April 2024, an album consisting of 14 songs.

== Release ==
=== Theatrical ===
Varshangalkku Shesham was theatrically released worldwide on 11 April 2024 with a U certificate from CBFC during the Ramadan and Vishu weekend, along with Aavesham and Jai Ganesh. The date was announced through a first-look poster released by director Karan Johar in December 2023.

=== Distribution ===
The film was distributed by the production company Merryland Cinemas in Kerala, while Phars Film acquired the distribution rights in overseas territories. Sakthi Film Factory acquired the theatrical rights for film distribution across Tamil Nadu.

=== Home media ===
The film started streaming on SonyLIV from 7 June 2024. The satellite rights of the film were acquired by Asianet and premiered on 1 September 2024.

== Reception ==
=== Critical reception ===
Varshangallku Shesham received mixed reviews from critics as well audiences upon release. On the review aggregator website Rotten Tomatoes, 72% of 8 critics' reviews are positive, with an average rating of 6.6/10.

Divya Nair of Rediff.com rated the film 3/5 stars and stated "Vineeth Sreenivasan deserves applause for striving to blend the past with the present and revoking[sic] your memories." Writing for The Times of India, Anna Mathews praised the performances of Nivin Pauly and Basil Joseph. Writing for Hindustan Times, Latha Srinivasan praised the performances of the cast and Vineeth Srinivasan's direction as earnest, but felt the film was lengthy and melodramatic. Cris of The News Minute praised the film as an ode to cinema and friendship. Anandu Suresh of The Indian Express, however, criticised the film's writing and Pranav Mohanlal's acting, but commended Nivin Pauly's performance.

=== Box office ===
Varshangalkku Shesham grossed over ₹82.75 crore in its theatrical run.
