= Mathukutty Xavier =

Indian film director

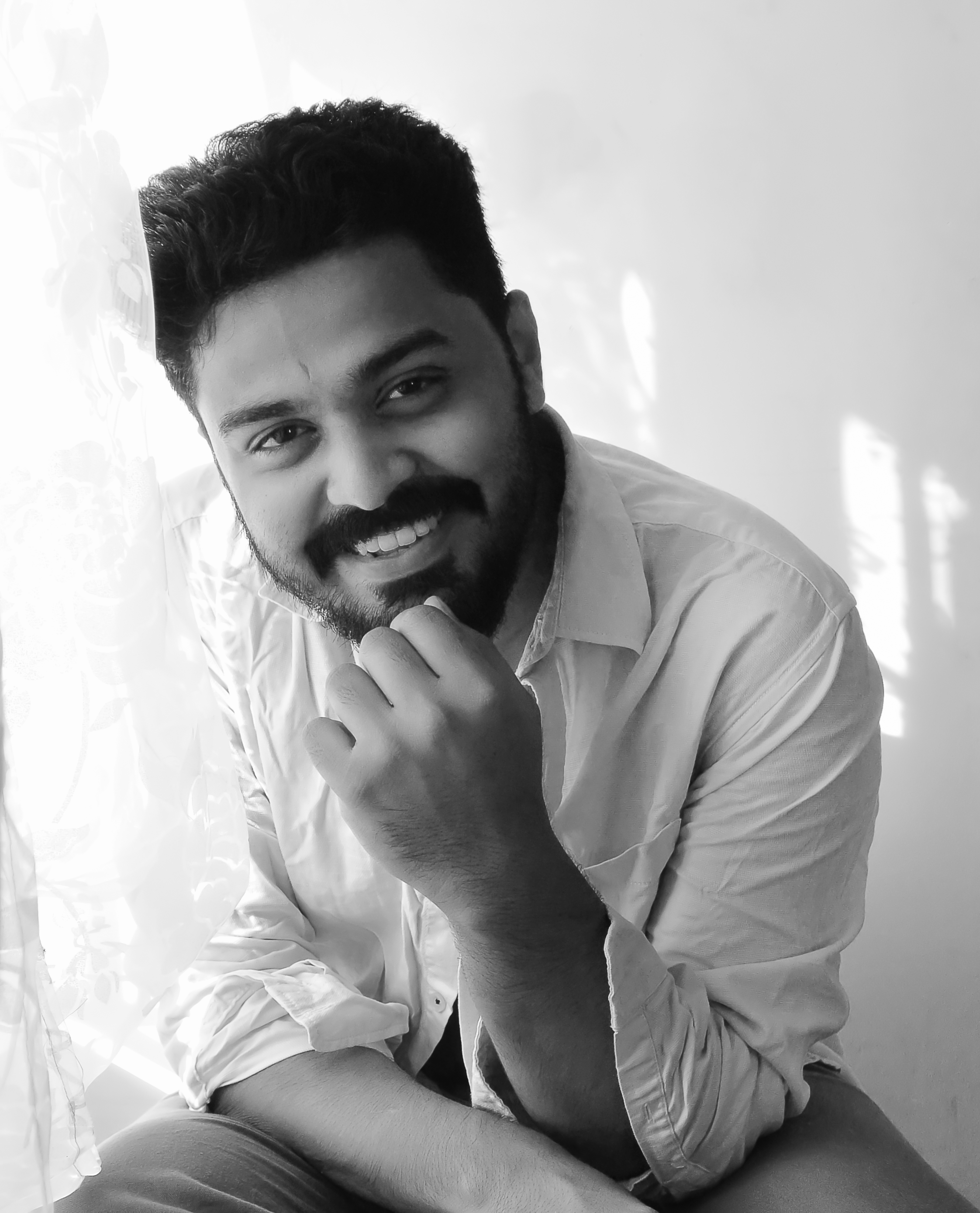
- Born: 21 April 1993 (age 33); Kerala, India
- Education: St. Joseph College of Communication
- Occupations: Director; screenwriter
- Years active: 2019–present
- Awards: Indira Gandhi Award for Best Debut Film of a Director (2019)

Mathukutty Xavier is an Indian film Director and Screenplay Writer who predominantly works in Malayalam Cinema. He has won the 67th National Award for Best Debut Film of a Director. His first film was Helen. The film is remade into Hindi titled as Mili directed by himself, with Janhvi Kapoor in the lead and featuring music by A. R. Rahman.

== Filmography ==
Year	Title	Credited as		Notes	Language
Year	Title	Director	Writer	Notes	Language
2019	Helen	Yes	Yes	Co-written with Alfred Kurian Joseph and Noble Babu Thomas	Malayalam
2022	Mili	Yes	Yes	Remake of Helen	Hindi
2023	Philip's	No	Yes	It is credited as the 300th film of actor Mukesh.	Malayalam

== Awards ==
- 67th National Award - Indira Gandhi Award for Best Debut Film of a Director - Helen
