= Helen (2019 film) =

2019 film by Mathukkutty Xavier

- Theatrical release poster
- Directed by: Mathukutty Xavier
- Written by: Alfred Kurian Joseph; Noble Babu Thomas; Mathukutty Xavier
- Produced by: Vineeth Sreenivasan; Noble Babu Thomas
- Starring: Anna Ben; Lal; Noble Babu Thomas
- Cinematography: Anend C. Chandran
- Edited by: Shameer Muhammed
- Music by: Shaan Rahman
- Production companies: Habit of Life; Big Bang Entertainments
- Distributed by: Funtastic Films
- Release date: 15 November 2019
- Running time: 117 minutes
- Country: India
- Language: Malayalam

Helen is a 2019 Indian Malayalam-language survival thriller film directed by Mathukutty Xavier (in his directorial debut) and produced by Vineeth Sreenivasan under the companies Habit of Life and Big Bang Entertainments. The film stars Anna Ben in the title role, while Lal, Noble Babu Thomas (who also co-produced and co-wrote the film), Aju Varghese, Rony David and Binu Pappu appear in supporting roles. The soundtrack was composed by Shaan Rahman.

Helen was released on 15 November 2019. The film won two National Film Awards – Best Debut Film of a Director and Best Make-up Artist (Ranjith Ambady) – and Ben won the Kerala State Film Award – Special Jury Award. It was remade into Tamil as Anbirkiniyal (2021), in Odia as Monalisa (2021) and in Hindi by the same director as Mili (2022).

== Plot ==
Helen Paul is a B.Sc Nursing graduate and attends IELTS coaching classes intended for a job abroad. She works part-time at a restaurant named The Chicken Hub, inside a plush mall. She lives with her father Paul, an insurance agent. He is not happy about her going abroad. Paul is a conservative Christian and has disagreement with Helen associating with non-Christian friends. Unbeknownst to Paul, Helen has a Muslim boyfriend, Azhar, who is also in search of a job.

One night, on their way to Helen's home, they are stopped by police and Azhar gets fined for not wearing a helmet and drunken driving, and they both are brought to the police station. Paul is summoned to the station and is in dismay of seeing his daughter and does not talk to her despite her several attempts. The following night, after work at the Chicken Hub, Helen's manager Jayashankar unknowingly locks her in the freezer room. At -18 °C, Helen has to survive in the freezing cold and tries everything to keep herself alive. She tries to block the evaporator fan but ends up dislocating her leg. She starts to get frostbite and begins to bleed through her nose.

Her father starts getting worried that Helen has not reached home. He searches for her with the help of his neighbour. They call all her co-workers but they do not know her whereabouts. Azhar, who was half-heartedly on his way to Chennai, returns and joins the search. They go to the police station to file a complaint and are greeted by the SI, Ratheesh Kumar whom they had met the day before. He suspects Azhar. Paul tries to defend him, and this causes a feud between the sub-inspector and the search party. He deliberately tries not to help them by not sharing the last tower location of Helen he obtained from the cyber cell.

They get a hint that Helen might have had a problem with the auto drivers in front of the mall and they all arrive at the mall to enquire. The auto driver whom they suspect denies any wrongdoing. At this point, they meet a watchman of the mall who says that Helen might not have left the mall because he usually notices her going in and out. They rush to the Chicken Hub and open the freezer. After 5 hours, they find Helen. She is taken to the hospital just before she enters the last stage of hypothermia. Paul then enquires with the watchman about how he was sure about the fact that Helen had not left the mall. He says that Helen always smiled at him every time she came in and out of the mall and that he had not seen her go out on the day of her missing.

Helen reunites with her father and boyfriend. The doctor says that she is out of danger but will need physiotherapy later. He continues that its difficult for any common man or woman to survive such cold condition and that Helen was a brave girl. When the watchman asks Paul what his daughter's name is, Paul proudly replies "Helen".

== Cast ==
- Anna Ben as Helen Paul
- Lal as Paul, Helen's father
- Noble Babu Thomas as Azhar, Helen's boyfriend
- Aju Varghese as SI Ratheesh Kumar
- Rony David as Jayashankar
- Binu Pappu as CI Ravi Prakash
- Bonny Mary Mathew as Littu
- Jayarajan Kozhikode as Mall security
- Vineeth Sreenivasan as Kanchan, Jail convict (cameo appearance)
- Kookal Raghavan as Raghavan
- Lakshmi Marikar as Helen's friend
- Lali Marikar as Azhar's mother
- Thrissur Elsy as Devamma
- Adinadu Sasi as Constable Sudevan
- Vinu Vijayakumar as Jins Babu
- Srikant Murali as Doctor
- Krishna as man who hits Azhar's bike in accident
- Nazrudeen Valiyaveettil as North Indian Mall security guard
- Malavika Wales

== Production ==
According to Mathukutty Xavier, he wanted to make a survival thriller as there were not many Malayalam films made on that genre since the 1992 film Malootty. The story was inspired from an incident that had taken place abroad. While writing, they had visited meat freezers in Aroor and Alappuzha and met workers who had been stuck in freezers for 5–6 hours. Eventually, a girl getting trapped in a meat freezer became its basic thread. Similar incidents reported in newspaper were referred and formed a fictional plot. Characters such as the girl's father and boyfriend were brought in to make it emotionally connected to the audience. Their motive was to target family and youth audience. After completing the script Xavier went to meet Vineeth Sreenivasan for his feedback. On hearing the script halfway through, Vineeth expressed interest in producing the film.

On 1 August 2019, Vineeth Sreenivasan announced the film with Anna Ben in the lead role and a title poster was released. It was reported Lal would play Helen's father and Noble Babu Thomas was paired opposite Anna. It was reported to be a woman-centric film, in which Anna plays a girl who works in a fast food joint in Kochi.

== Soundtrack ==
Helen

Soundtrack album by Shaan Rahman
- Released: 1 November 2019
- Recorded: 2019
- Genre: Feature film soundtrack
- Length: 10:21
- Language: Malayalam
- Label: Muzik 247
- Producer: Shaan Rahman

Shaan Rahman chronology
Pranaya Meenukalude Kadal (2019)	Helen (2019)	Kunjeldho (2020)

On 1 November 2019, the first song of the film titled "Pon Thaarame" sung by Vineeth Sreenivasan and Divya Vineeth was released. Composed by Shaan Rahman, its lyrics were written by Vinayak Sasikumar, Vineeth Sreenivasan and Manu Manjith.

Track list
No.	Title	Lyrics	Singer(s)	Length
1.	"Pon Thaarame"	Vinayak Sasikumar	Vineeth Sreenivasan, Divya Vineeth	03:46
2.	"Kaanaatheeram"	Vinayak Sasikumar	Megha Josekutty	02:19
3.	"Thaarapadhamaake"	Vineeth Sreenivasan	Prarthana Indrajith	02:17
4.	"Praanante"	Manu Manjith	Vineeth Sreenivasan	01:59
Total length:				10:21

== Release ==
The film was released on 15 November 2019. Funtastic Films headed by Visakh Subramaniam and Aju Varghese was in charge of the film's distribution.

=== Reception ===
Rating 4 out of 5 stars, Sajin Shrijith of The New Indian Express wrote: "It's one of those rare survival dramas where innovative ideas are strongly backed by nail-biting tension and emotional stakes." He praised Anna Ben's performance: "Anna Ben, who made a terrific debut in Kumbalangi Nights, proves with Helen that she is not a one-hit-wonder." Sify rated the movie 4 out of 5 stating: "Helen is the kind of movie that start affecting you slowly and shakes up totally by the time the end titles start rolling." Also praising Aju Varghese's performance, the review concluded: "Watch out for a brilliant show from Aju Varghese, who is doing a character that has a different shade from usual." Anna M. M. Vetticad of Firstpost awarded 3.5 in a scale of 5 and gave the verdict: "Helen is right up there with the best of 2019." Anjana George of The Times of India rated it 3.5 out of 5 stars and commented: "A heart rending survival drama." She praised Anend C. Chandran's cinematography and Shaan Rahman's music: "With a lot of close-up shots and colourful visuals, Anend C Chandran's cinematography amps up the movie's pace. Shaan Rahman comes up with some fab music." She also added: "Helen is a typical family film from the Vineeth Sreenivasan school of filmmaking which is enjoyable and empathetic. The feel-good movie, though a survival drama, would definitely bring a smile to the faces as the curtains come down." Litty Simon of Malayala Manorama said that "... Mathukutty Xavier's Helen played by Anna Ben is all set to make thousands of movie-goers her staunch fans in the coming days." She added: "The storytelling is easygoing and naturalistic. Some thrilling moments in the film make us believe that the director is definitely here to stay." She also praised its editing and cinematography: "Shameer Muhammed's crisp editing and Anand C. Chandran's cinematography helped develop this heart-warming tale of survival."

== Awards ==
Award	Category	Nominee(s)	Result	Ref.
67th National Film Awards	Best Debut Film of a Director	Helen	Won	
67th National Film Awards	Best Make-up Artist	Ranjith Ambady	Won	
50th Kerala State Film Awards	Best Make-up Artist	Ranjith Ambady	Won	
50th Kerala State Film Awards	Special Mention	Anna Ben	Won	
CPC Cine Awards 2019	Best Actress in a Lead Role	Anna Ben	Won	
Movie Street Film Awards 2020	Best Actor in a Lead Role – Female	Anna Ben	Won	
Movie Street Film Awards 2020	Best Lyricist	Vinayak Sasikumar	Won	
Vanitha Film Awards 2020	Best Debutant Actress	Anna Ben	Won	
Critics Choice Film Awards 2020	Best Malayalam Film	Helen	Nominated	
Critics Choice Film Awards 2020	Best Malayalam Actress	Anna Ben	Nominated	
Critics Choice Film Awards 2020	Best Malayalam Director	Mathukutty Xavier	Nominated	
Critics Choice Film Awards 2020	Best Malayalam Writing	Alfred Kurian Joseph; Noble Babu Thomas; Mathukutty Xavier	Nominated	
9th South Indian International Movie Awards	Best Debut Actress	Anna Ben	Won	
9th South Indian International Movie Awards	Best Music Director	Shaan Rahman	Nominated	
9th South Indian International Movie Awards	Best Female Singer	Prarthana Indrajith	Won	

== Remakes ==
Helen was remade in Tamil as Anbirkiniyal (2021). It was also remade in Odia as Monalisa (2021), and Hindi as Mili (2022) by the same director. By March 2020, Lohit H. of Friday Films had acquired the remake rights for Kannada, which was to be directed by debutants Arunkumar M. and Sabu Aloysius. Lasya Nagaraj was confirmed to play the central character. The following month, a Telugu remake starring Anupama Parameswaran was announced. Prasad V. Potluri would be producing the film which would be directed by debutant Hanuman Chowdary.
