= Prarthana Indrajith =

Indian playback singer

- Born: 29 October 2002 (age 23); Ernakulam, Kerala, India
- Occupation: Playback singer
- Years active: 2017–present
- Parent(s): Indrajith Sukumaran (father); Poornima Indrajith (mother)
- Relatives: Sukumaran (grandfather); Mallika Sukumaran (grandmother); Prithviraj Sukumaran (uncle); Supriya Menon (aunt)

Prarthana Indrajith (born 29 October 2004) is an Indian playback singer. She predominantly works in the Malayalam film industry, and has also sung in Tamil and Hindi films. Her debut performance was the song "Ko Ko Kozhi" for the Malayalam film The Great Father.

== Early life and family ==
She is the elder daughter of actors Indrajith Sukumaran and Poornima Indrajith. Her paternal grandparents, Sukumaran and Mallika Sukumaran, and her paternal uncle Prithviraj Sukumaran are also actors. She completed her schooling from Gregorian Public School, Kochi. She later pursued a degree in music from Goldsmiths London.

== Discography ==
Year	Song	Film / album	Notes
2017	Ko Ko Kozhi	The Great Father	
2018	La La Laletta	Mohanlal	
2018	Naadottukku	Kuttanpillayude Sivarathri	
2019	Thaarapadhamaake	Helen	
2020	Re Bawree	Taish	Hindi song
2021	Unkoodave	Anbirkiniyal	Tamil song
2021	Andraadam	Anbirkiniyal	Tamil song
2021	Amma	Chakra	
2022	Viduthalai	Hey Sinamika	Tamil song
2023	Mullaanu	O.Baby	
2025	L2E Teaser Theme	L2: Empuraan	

== Awards and nominations ==
Award	Year	Category	Song	Film	Result	Ref.
Asiavision Awards	2018	New Sensation In Singing	Laleetta	Mohanlal	Won	
South Indian International Movie Awards	2018	Best Female Playback Singer (Malayalam)	Laleetta	Mohanal	Nominated	
South Indian International Movie Awards	2019	Best Female Playback Singer (Malayalam)	Tharapadhamake	Helen	Won	
