= Written & Directed by God =

2025 Indian drama film

- Theatrical release poster
- Directed by: Febi George
- Written by: Jomon John; Linto Devasia; Roshan Mathew
- Produced by: Thomas Jose; Sanoob K. Yoousef
- Starring: Saiju Kurup; Sunny Wayne
- Cinematography: Ajay George Francis
- Edited by: Abhishek G. A.
- Music by: Shaan Rahman
- Production companies: TJ Productions; Neetoran Films
- Distributed by: Goodwill Entertainments
- Release date: 5 June 2025 (Kerala)
- Country: India
- Language: Malayalam

Written & Directed by God (also marketed as Written and Directed by God) is a 2025 Indian Malayalam-language drama film directed by Febi George and written by Jomon John, Linto Devasia, and Roshan Varghese Mathew. The film stars Sunny Wayne as God and Saiju Kurup as Jijo. The film explores themes of self-discovery, spirituality, and second chances through the unlikely encounter between a struggling filmmaker and a divine entity.

== Plot ==
The film centers on Jijo, a struggling filmmaker, who is facing a creative and financial crisis. Unable to secure his next project and strapped for cash, Jijo experiences a small dispute with his wife. After dropping her and their child at home, he makes an angry, exasperated gesture towards the heavens. This act is enough to catch the attention of God, who subsequently pays Jijo a personal visit.

Initially, Jijo hopes to use this divine encounter to ask for wishes that will resolve his problems. However, the interaction takes an unexpected turn when God expresses a wish of his own, enlisting Jijo's help to fulfill it. Through the process of assisting God, Jijo embarks on a profound journey of self-discovery, gaining a fresh perspective on life and developing a newfound empathy for others. This transformative experience allows him to overcome his past failures and rediscover his purpose.

== Cast ==
- Saiju Kurup as Jijo Varghese
- Sunny Wayne as God
- Bibin George as Scientist Ram
- Aparna Das as Lissy
- Austin Dan
- Dinesh Prabhakar
- Neena Kurup
- Manikandan Pattambi
- Balaji Sharma
- Vaishak Vijayan
- Chembil Ashokan
- Lishoy
- Abhishek
- Babu Jose
- Jolly Chirayathu

== Reception ==
=== Critical reception ===
Anna Mathews of The Times of India rated the film 2.5/5 stars and wrote, "It seems nice to have a feel-good movie amid all the action and violence we’ve been seeing lately. But even feel-good movies need a bit more nuance, rather than just simplistic narratives. The film feels like it had a lot of wasted potential, while it could have conveyed a message with humour."

Vivek Santosh of The New Indian Express wrote, "Written & Directed by God wants to say something uplifting about second chances, compassion and divine intervention. But with its old-fashioned direction, clumsy storytelling, and an overbearing tendency to spell out every emotion, the film becomes more exhausting than enlightening. There’s a clear intent to inspire, but little trust in the audience’s ability to engage without constant hand-holding. By the time the credits roll, the film feels less like a spiritual fable and more like a long-winded lecture dressed up as cinema."
