= Pranaya Meenukalude Kadal =

2019 film directed by Kamal

- Theatrical release poster
- Directed by: Kamal
- Screenplay by: John Paul; Kamal
- Produced by: Johny Vattakuzhi
- Starring: Vinayakan; Dileesh Pothan; Saiju Kurup; Riddhi Kumar; Joe John Chacko
- Cinematography: Vishnu Panicker
- Edited by: Shameer Muhammed
- Music by: Shaan Rahman
- Production company: Dani Productions
- Distributed by: Frames Inevitable
- Release date: 4 October 2019
- Running time: 135 minutes
- Country: India
- Language: Malayalam

Pranaya Meenukalude Kadal (transl. Sea of romantic fishes) is a 2019 Indian Malayalam-language romantic drama film co-written and directed by Kamal and produced by Johny Vattakuzhi under the banner of Dani Productions. The film stars Vinayakan, Dileesh Pothan, Saiju Kurup, Gabri Jose, Riddhi Kumar and Joe John Chacko. The film was released on 4 October 2019 by Frames Inevitable.

== Cast ==
- Vinayakan as Hyder
- Dileesh Pothan as Ansari
- Gabri Jose as Ajmal
- Riddhi Kumar as Jasmine
- Jitin Puthenchery as Koyamon
- Joe John Chacko
- Sreedhanya as Dr Sulfat Beevi, Jasmine's mother
- Saiju Kurup as Satheeshan
- Padmavati Rao as Bini Noorjehan, Jasmine's grandmother
- Kailash as Sulfat's husband
- Sudheesh as Damodharan

== Soundtrack ==
Pranaya Meenukalude Kadal

Soundtrack album by Shaan Rahman
- Released: 16 September 2019
- Recorded: 2019
- Studio: VGP Studios
- Genre: Feature film soundtrack
- Length: 19:08
- Language: Malayalam
- Label: Muzik247

Shaan Rahman chronology
Love Action Drama (2019)	Pranaya Meenukalude Kadal (2019)	Kunjeldho (2020)
External audio
- Audio Jukebox on YouTube

The soundtrack is composed by Shaan Rahman and lyrics by BK Harinarayanan and Rafeeq Ahamed.

Track list
No.	Title	Lyrics	Singer(s)	Length
1.	"Kavarathi" (Chorus by: Global Public School Chorus Group)	BK Harinarayanan	Lekshmi S Nair, Anjaly Anand	4:12
2.	"Kaamukan" (Backing vocals by: Nanda J Devan)	BK Harinarayanan	Shaan Rahman	4:12
3.	"Neelime"	Rafeeq Ahamed	Shweta Mohan and Najim Arshad	4:32
4.	"Mere Maula"	Rafeeq Ahamed	Hesham Abdul Wahab and Shaan Rahman	6:12
Total length:				19:08

== Release ==
The official trailer of the film was unveiled by Muzik247 on 4 September 2019.

The film was released, theatrically, on 4 October 2019. The film is available online from April 2020 onwards.
