= Love Action Drama =

2019 Indian film

- Theatrical release poster
- Directed by: Dhyan Sreenivasan
- Written by: Dhyan Sreenivasan
- Produced by: Visakh Subramaniam; Aju Varghese
- Starring: Nivin Pauly; Nayanthara; Aju Varghese
- Cinematography: Jomon T. John; Roby Varghese Raj
- Edited by: Vivek Harshan
- Music by: Shaan Rahman
- Production companies: Funtastic Films; M-Star Little Communications
- Distributed by: Funtastic Films Release
- Release date: 5 September 2019 (India)
- Running time: 146 minutes
- Country: India
- Language: Malayalam
- Box office: ₹50 crore

Love Action Drama is a 2019 Indian Malayalam-language romantic comedy film written and directed by Dhyan Sreenivasan in his directorial debut. Produced by Visakh Subramaniam and Aju Varghese, the film stars Nivin Pauly and Nayanthara in the lead roles. The music in the film was composed by Shaan Rahman. The film was released in India on 5 September 2019 and internationally on 13 September 2019.

== Plot ==
Dinesh, a wealthy bachelor who is overconfident of himself tries to impress Shobha with the help of his best friend Sagar and hopes to marry her someday.

The movie takes place in a series of flashbacks, starting with Dinesh reminiscing about his first meeting with Shobha and their relationship. Dinesh comes from a very rich background and as such doesn't work, he is always engaged with partying and drinking with his friends. He's upset that his cousin Swathi is getting married. They were supposedly in a relationship until Swathi learned through google (when they were still kids) that people who are blood-relatives tend to have babies with higher probability in genetic disorders and breaks up with Dinesh (when they were still kids).

Dinesh is still upset about it and wants to break up the wedding at any cost. Shobha is one of Swathi's friends and she seems to like Dinesh on sight. Shobha definitely seems to find his antics funny, not getting mad when she gets hurt as a result of Dinesh's plan to hurt the bridegroom. He mistakenly enters Shobha's room and spills coconut oil on the floor (while drunk) hoping the bridegroom will get hurt and the marriage will be cancelled. Later, Dinesh is asked to accompany Shobha's friends in the hospital for her overnight stay and has a conversation with her. Shobha advises Dinesh to move on, get a haircut, shave and attend the wedding, saying some other girl is sure to fall for him. They flirt throughout the wedding and she indirectly invites him to meet up with her when he's in Chennai.

Dinesh finds a way to temporarily shift to Chennai with his friend&cousin Sagar, to woo Shobha. He hangs out with Shobha and her friends at first and things seem to be going fine for them. One day, Dinesh and Sagar start a fight during Shobha's friend Priya's birthday party and Shobha asks them to stay away. Her friends criticize her for introducing vagabonds to their group. Shobha learns that Dinesh is not pursuing master's like he told her, but is just wasting time drinking and spending money without a care in the world. Shobha, although wealthy too, works hard and runs her own business. Dinesh sets about trying to get back into Shobha's good graces. He starts with her friends first, and wins their trust. Shobha agrees to a relationship and potential marriage to Dinesh, placing one condition that he should give up smoking and drinking. Dinesh agrees to her condition but ends up getting drunk that very night. Shobha and Priya catch him in the act (he rents a house opposite to hers) and storms away in anger.

Dinesh manages to convince Shobha by donning on Sabarimala (religious oath to abstain from indulging alcohol-related activities for 41 days) and they get back together. This time, Dinesh becomes suspicious and too possessive of Shobha because she's always busy with work and avoids the topic of settling down, moving in together as well as eventually getting married then building a family. Some random guy implies to Dinesh that Shobha dates around a lot and he starts following her to find out what she's actually doing for a few days. Dinesh confronts the guy and he vaguely implies how beautiful girls like Shobha always have plenty of guys admiring her and it's common to throw away a partner when a better one comes around. Enraged, Dinesh gets rid of the chains and bracelet (religious constraint) and drinks an entire bottle of vodka. Sagar admits him to the hospital and calls Shobha and Priya. Shobha slaps Dinesh and he walks away in anger. A few days later, Shobha calls and proposes marriage, to which he agrees.

Shobha's father doesn't like Dinesh, after tricking and finding out that Dinesh still drinks despite several promises made to Shobha, but doesn't say no to the match because Shobha has faith "he will take care of" her. Two days before the wedding, Dinesh is approached by a stranger who has a few photographs of himself and Shobha together, stating Shobha cheated him after getting a better match in the form of wealthy Dinesh. This is where the flashbacks end as Dinesh is contemplating what to do next. He already calls off the wedding through a phone call with Shobha. When his mom asks Dinesh to meet and discuss in person the reason for calling off the wedding, Dinesh reminds Shobha's father about his failed marriage when he tries to give them advice. This pushes Shobha to give up changing him and she leaves with her father.

Dinesh is leaving the city with Sagar when he finds out through a selfie, drunkenly posted on Facebook by the stranger, Suman that he and the guy who implied Shobha dates a lot and another of Shobha's friend's husband are all friends. Turns out these three guys planned and ruined Dinesh and Shobha's relationship on purpose. Priya's ex-husband is mad that his marriage ended mainly because of Shobha. Initially, he and Priya have been so in love but because she spends most of the day with Shoba instead of him even after getting married, this creates tension between them. He had even expressed to her his discomfort feelings regarding this matter, however, she does not change and this frustration and disappointment lead him to slap Priya and Shobha came in just in time to see that and she forcibly brought Priya out of their home to keep her away from him permanently. Hence, he plotted this plan in revenge to make Shobha feel the pain he experienced after the separation.

Shobha and her friends are called to the police station after Dinesh beats those three guys up. Dinesh begs for forgiveness and expresses that he needs her, saying he's wrong to suspect her. Shobha resists at first, stating she doesn't trust him anymore and that faith in the relationship is crucial. She soon agrees, mentioning the same 'no drinking & smoking' conditions to which Dinesh agrees, and tells him to convince her father. Later, Dinesh begs Shobha's father for forgiveness.

Cut to Present: Dinesh takes an alcoholic drink and smokes a cigarette with Sagar before entering the marriage hall where he marries Shobha.

== Cast ==
- Nivin Pauly as Dinesh P.
  - Dwayne Wayanad as Young Dinesh
- Nayanthara as Shobha
- Aju Varghese as Sagar
  - Vashisht as Young Sagar
- Prajin Padmanabhan as Ravi Krishna
- Durga Krishna as Swathy
- Sreenivasan as Shobha's father
- Mallika Sukumaran as Lalitha, Dinesh's mother
- Renji Panicker as Rajiv, Swathy's father
- Basil Joseph as Brijesh
- Jude Anthany Joseph as Shinoj
- Biju Sopanam as Vijayan, Dinesh's uncle
- Dhanya Balakrishna as Priya
- Motta Rajendran as SI Rajendar
- Vaiyapuri as Doctor
- Sunder Ramu as Venkit Mohan
- Gayathri Shan as Kala
- Vismaya as Vismaya
- Jeevika as Shobha's friend
- Seetha as Shobha's mother (photo presence)
- Vineeth Sreenivasan as Suman/Rohan (cameo appearance)
- Dhyan Sreenivasan as himself (cameo appearance)
- Bhagath Manuel as himself (cameo appearance)
- Deepak Parambol as himself (cameo appearance)
- Harikrishnan as himself (cameo appearance)
- Geevarghese Eapen as himself (cameo appearance)

== Production ==
Love Action Drama marks the directorial debut of the actor Dhyan Sreenivasan, and his second screenplay after Goodalochana. The film also marks the debut production of Visakh Subramaniam and Aju Varghese under their newly formed production company Funtastic Films. It was during the time of Adi Kapyare Kootamani (2015) that Subramaniam and Aju decided to co-produce the film. Love Action Drama was announced in July 2017, during the fifth anniversary of Thattathin Marayathu. The film, according to Dhyan, is a modern-day take on the 1989 film Vadakkunokkiyantram written, directed and starring his father Sreenivasan. Nivin's and Nayanthara's characters were named Dineshan and Shobha after the names of the lead characters in Vadakkunokkiyantram.

It was Vineeth Sreenivasan who suggested the name of Nayanthara and she immediately agreed after hearing the screenplay. Dhyan completed the screenplay by November 2017. The filming was expected to begin by the end of the year, but had to wait for the lead actors' availability. In February 2018, Aju said that the shoot would begin by July 2018, once Nivin completes filming Kayamkulam Kochunni. He also revealed that Nivin was planning to lose weight for the role. A pooja function for the film was held at Anjumana Devi Temple in Kochi on 14 July 2018, with principal photography beginning the same day. The first schedule ended on 27 July 2018. After a delay, the second schedule began in February 2019 and the entire filming process was completed by early June 2019.

== Music ==
Love Action Drama

Soundtrack album by Shaan Rahman
- Released: 2019
- Genre: Feature film soundtrack
- Length: 23:08
- Language: Malayalam
- Label: Muzik 247

Shaan Rahman chronology
Sachin (2019)	Love Action Drama (2019)	Pranaya Meenukalude Kadal (2019)

The music was composed by Shaan Rahman, with lyrics written by Manu Manjith, Preeti Nambiar, B. K. Harinarayanan, Santhosh Varma, and Vineeth Sreenivasan. The song teaser of "Kudukku" crossed 13 million views within its release. The audio rights were acquired by Muzik247.

Track listing
No.	Title	Lyrics	Singer(s)	Length
1.	"Raathein"	Preeti Nambiar	Narayani Gopan, Shaan Rahman	3.03
2.	"Kudukku"	Manu Manjith	Vineeth Sreenivasan	2.36
3.	"Varavaayi"	B. K. Harinarayanan	Shaan Rahman	4.77
4.	"Aalolam"	Santhosh Varma	K. S. Harisankar, Gowry Lekshmi	4.13
5.	"Churulariyaatha"	Vineeth Sreenivasan	Vineeth Sreenivasan	1.85
6.	"Ponvilakkaayi"	B. K. Harinarayanan	Shaan Rahman	2.29
7.	"Oru Swapnam Pole"	Manu Manjith	Bharath Sajikumar, Aswin Vijayan, Sreejish C. S., Nanda J. Devan, Narayani Gopan	4.65
Total length:				23.08

== Release ==
=== Theatrical ===
Love Action Drama was released in theatres across India on 5 September 2019 and in rest-of-India in the following day and was released internationally on 13 September 2019.

== Reception ==
=== Box office ===
The film got mixed reviews from critics but was a commercial success at the box office and ran for 100 days.The film collected ₹1.8 crore from Kerala box office on its first day of release.

The film grossed US$387,185 from 46 screens in the opening weekend (12 – 15 September) in the United Arab Emirates and US$528,340 in four weeks. In the opening weekends in other territories in the following weeks, it grossed A$15,914 (₹7.83 lakh) from six screens in Australia, US$34,021 (₹24.14 lakh) from 34 screens in the United States, NZ$13,265 (₹5.91 lakh) from 8 screens in New Zealand, and US$6,625 (₹4.7 lakh) from four screens in Canada. It grossed NZ$19,378 (₹8.58 lakh) in New Zealand in two weeks, A$25,361 (₹12.1 lakh) in Australia in three weeks, and US$53,887 (₹38.15 lakh) in the US in five weeks.

=== Critical response ===
Malayala Manorama rated 3 in a scale of 5, and said: "as a simple fun-filled movie, Love Action Drama stands out. There are things that keep us interested in proceedings as Dhyan Sreenivasan focuses on making an out-an-out entertainer than delivering so-called realistic or sensible content. As a debutant director, Dhyan has managed to make an enjoyable film with ease". Calling the film "entertaining", Sify rated 3 out of 5 and wrote, "Love Action Drama is a romantic comedy that is a fine watch that ensures some good laughs and some fine moments". Anna Mathews of The Times of India rated 3 out of 5 stars and wrote "Love Action Drama is a simple, in fact, old fashioned tale, but it has many laugh out loud moments and, apart from the lead acts, who have great charisma and chemistry, Aju Varghese who plays Sagar, Nivin Pauly's cousin and confidante, adds great entertainment". Rating 3 out of 5, Manoj Kumar R. of The Indian Express said: "Dhyan smartly weaves some effective observations on the battle of the sexes into an entertaining romantic comedy, which feels more like pop-corn blockbuster than a comment on the complexity of today's relationships".

Deccan Chronicle rated 3 out of 5 and wrote: "Dhyan's direction is above average and the film hardly offers any boring or dead sequence ... Delicious visuals in Chennai and decent music make it a worthy one-time watch. Sajin Shrijith of The New Indian Express rated 2.5 out of 5, stating "It's obvious that the goal of the film is only to entertain us and not be too intellectual. Even so, there has to be a certain degree of emotional conflict to get us invested in the drama". Sowmya Rajendran of The News Minute rated 2 out of 5 and stated "LAD is like a stuck record, playing the one line story of the film over and over again". Gulf News critic said "'LAD' is all frills with little substance", adding that "there seems to have been an urge to fill it with as many commercial elements possible. The resulting cocktail tastes insipid".

The Hindu wrote: "Even for a movie which doesn't take itself too seriously, which is a good thing, the lack of seriousness in having a solid script hurts it sorely. This is especially evident in the second half, when even the peppy song numbers and the jokes thrown in mechanically at regular intervals fail to excite". HuffPost wrote: "Dhyan Sreenivasan is definitely inspired by his brother Vineeth Sreenivasan's sense of humour in cinema. But unlike him, Dhyan is more inclined towards the social media troll/meme version of comedy. So, what we get are already seen and heard, just that Dhyan copy-pastes it at various scenes. It's easy and lazy writing. Few of the gags work, most fall flat". Anna M. M. Vetticad from Firstpost awarded 1.5 in a scale of 5 and said: "Love Action Drama taps his [Nivin Pauly's] versatility with a narrative that repeatedly breaks its own mood by jumping from extreme intensity to extreme frivolity without warning often within the same scene. The switches are fun at first because they signal the writer-director's keenness that we not take his film too seriously. Fair enough. The technique wears thin though as Love Action Drama's lack of substance becomes increasingly obvious and it wanders about aimlessly, wanders again, then wanders some more".
