= Shaan Rahman =

Indian film score composer

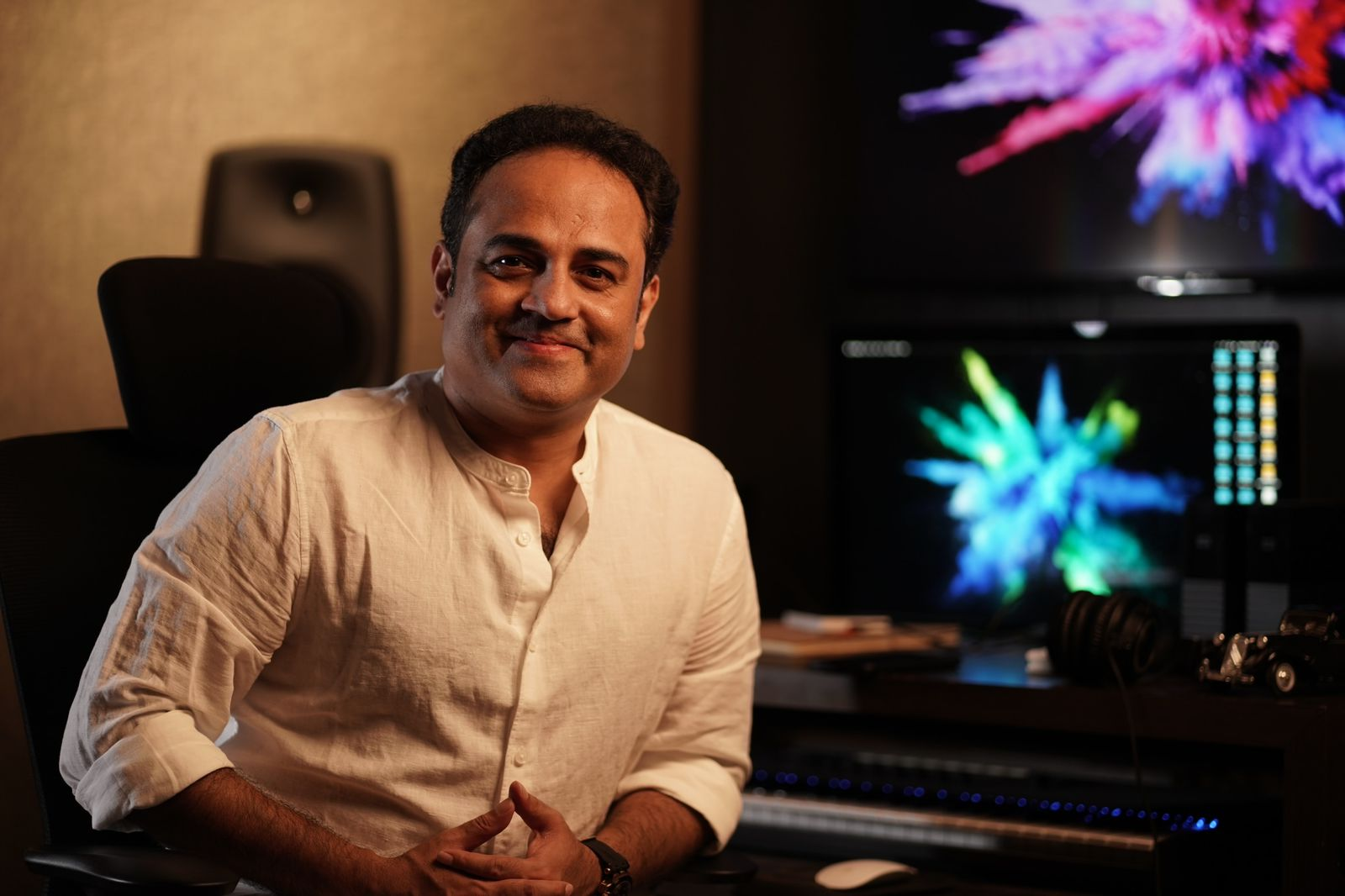

Background information
- Born: 30 December 1979 (age 46); Thalassery, Kerala
- Occupations: Music composer; producer; programmer; singer
- Years active: 2006–present
- Spouse: Zaira (m. 2009)
- Musical career
- Genres: Filmi; Classical music; World music
- Instruments: Keyboard, piano, vocals
- Labels: Think Music; Sony Music; Muzik247; Satyam Audios; Manorama Music

Shaan Rahman (born 30 December 1979) is an Indian composer and singer, best known for his compositions in the Malayalam film industry. Shaan made his debut as a music director in the 2009 film Ee Pattanathil Bhootham directed by Johny Antony. He got the chance to work in the film after the wide acceptance and popularity of his 2008 music album "Coffee at MG Road" which he did along with his friend, singer and director Vineeth Sreenivasan.

Vineeth invited him to work in his directorial debut film Malarvaadi Arts Club (2010). Later on, Shaan has frequently collaborated with Vineeth in his films.

He has gained popularity with films such as Thattathin Marayathu (2012), Ormayundo Ee Mukham (2014), Aadu (2015),Oru Vadakkan Selfie (2015), Adi Kapyare Kootamani (2015), Vettah (2016), Jacobinte Swargarajyam (2016), Annmariya Kalippilaanu (2016), and the song Jimikki Kammal from the film Velipadinte Pusthakam (2017) gained nationwide acceptance with so many alternative versions of it being released online.

Shaan's third film as a music director was Thattathin Marayathu (2012), directed by Vineeth Sreenivasan. Its music was positively received by the public and composer M. Jayachandran went on to state that "Muthuchippi Poloru" was his favourite song of the year. In 2014, he made his Telugu debut with Saheba Subramanyam which is the remake of Thattathin Marayathu.

== Early and personal life ==
Shaan was born and brought up in Thalassery, Kannur district. He lives with his family at Kakkanad, Kochi. Shaan's father works for the Union Cement Company (UCC) while his mother remains a housewife. He has a younger sister Sherry and a brother Shaheer.Shaan married Zaira on 11 October 2009. They have a son, Rayaan.

== Shaan Rahman Music Conservatory ==
In 2023, Shaan Rahman founded the Shaan Rahman Music Conservatory in Kochi, Kerala. The conservatory is dedicated to training and nurturing talent in the field of music. The conservatory offers various programs in music, including courses in Hindustani vocal, Carnatic vocal, Western vocal, Guitar, and Piano.

== Albums ==
- Desi Noise Revolution (2006)
- Malayalee (2007)
- Coffee at MG Road (2008)

== Television ==
Year	Show	Channel	Notes
2013–2017	Pathinalam Ravu - Season 1 to 5	MediaOne TV	Judge
2018	Super 4	Mazhavil Manorama	Judge
2019–2020	Sa Re Ga Ma Pa Keralam	Zee Keralam	Judge
2020	Super 4 season 2	Mazhavil Manorama	Celebrity Judge
2021-2022	Sa Re Ga Ma Pa Li'l Champs	Zee Keralam	Judge
2021	Mrs. Hitler	Zee Keralam	Title song composer
2023–2024	Sa Re Ga Ma Pa Keralam 2	Zee Keralam	Judge
2023	Shyamambaram	Zee Keralam	Himself

== Filmography ==
Year	Title	Role	Language	Notes
2024	Varshangalkku Shesham	Kamaraj	Malayalam	
2026	Athiradi	Himself	Malayalam	

== Discography ==
=== As composer ===
Year	Title	Director	Language	Notes
2009	Ee Pattanathil Bhootham	Johny Antony	Malayalam	Debut film
2010	Malarvaadi Arts Club	Vineeth Sreenivasan	Malayalam	
2011	The Metro	Bipin Prabhakar	Malayalam	
2012	Thattathin Marayathu	Vineeth Sreenivasan	Malayalam	Best Music Director SIIMA 2013
2013	Nam Duniya Nam Style	Preetham Gubbi	Kannada	Kannada debut
2013	Kutteem Kolum	Guinness Pakru	Malayalam	
2013	Hotel California	Aji John	Malayalam	
2013	Thira	Vineeth Sreenivasan	Malayalam	
2014	Om Shanti Oshana	Jude Anthany Joseph	Malayalam	
2014	Praise The Lord	Shibu Gangadharan	Malayalam	
2014	Saheba Subramanyam	Sasikiran Narayana	Telugu	Debut Telugu film. Remake of Thattathin Marayathu
2014	Ormayundo Ee Mukham	Anwar Sadiq	Malayalam	
2015	Aadu Oru Bheegara Jeevi Aanu	Midhun Manuel Thomas	Malayalam	
2015	Mili	Rajesh Pillai	Malayalam	Single "Manpaatha"
2015	Oru Vadakkan Selfie	G. Prajith	Malayalam	
2015	Adi Kapyare Kootamani	John Varghese	Malayalam	
2016	Vettah	Rajesh Pillai	Malayalam	
2016	Jacobinte Swargarajyam	Vineeth Sreenivasan	Malayalam	
2016	Meendum Oru Kadhal Kadhai	Mithran Jawahar	Tamil	Only score. Remake of Thattathin Marayathu
2016	Ann Maria Kalippilaanu	Midhun Manuel Thomas	Malayalam	
2016	Kochavva Paulo Ayyappa Coelho	Sidhartha Siva	Malayalam	
2016	Oru Muthassi Gadha	Jude Anthany Joseph	Malayalam	
2016	Gemini	P. K. Baaburaaj	Malayalam	
2017	Take Off	Mahesh Narayanan	Malayalam	Along with Gopi Sundar
2017	Godha	Basil Joseph	Malayalam	
2017	Puthan Panam	Ranjith	Malayalam	
2017	Meda Meeda Abbayi	G. Prajith	Telugu	Remake of Oru Vadakkan Selfie
2017	Velipadinte Pusthakam	Lal Jose	Malayalam	
2017	Goodalochana	Thomas K Sebastian	Malayalam	Single "Ee Angaadi Kavalayil"
2017	Prematho Mee Karthik	Rishi Raj	Malayalam	
2017	Aana Alaralodalaral	Dileep Menon	Malayalam	
2017	Aadu 2	Midhun Manuel Thomas	Malayalam	
2018	Rachayitha	Vidya Sagar Raju	Malayalam	
2018	My Story	Roshni Dinaker	Malayalam	
2018	Chanakya Thanthram	Kannan Thamarakkulam	Malayalam	
2018	Aravindante Athidhikal	M. Mohanan	Malayalam	
2018	Johny Johny Yes Appa	G. Marthandan	Malayalam	
2018	Njan Prakashan	Sathyan Anthikad	Malayalam	
2019	Allu Ramendran	Bilahari	Malayalam	
2019	9	Jenuse Mohamed	Malayalam	Only songs. Score composed by Sekhar Menon.
2019	Oru Adaar Love	Omar Lulu	Malayalam	
2019	Janamaithri	John Manthrickal	Malayalam	
2019	Sathyam Paranja Viswasikkuvo	G. Prajith	Malayalam	
2019	Sachin	Santhosh Nair	Malayalam	
2019	Love Action Drama	Dhyan Sreenivasan	Malayalam	
2019	Pranaya Meenukalude Kadal	Kamal	Malayalam	
2019	Jack & Daniel	S. L. Puram Jayasurya	Malayalam	
2019	Helen	Mathukkutty	Malayalam	
2021	Sara's	Jude Anthany Joseph	Malayalam	Amazon Prime film
2021	Minnal Murali	Basil Joseph	Malayalam	4 songs only. Score composed by Sushin Shyam
2021	Kunjeldho	Mathukkutty	Malayalam	
2021	Oru Thathvika Avalokanam	Akhil Marar	Malayalam	Only score
2022	Ullasam	Jeevan Jojo	Malayalam	
2022	King Fish	Anoop Menon	Malayalam	Only score
2022	John Luther	Abijith Joseph	Malayalam	
2022	Prakashan Parakkatte	Shahad Nilambur	Malayalam	
2022	Roop Nagar Ke Cheetey	Vihan Suryavanshi	Marathi	Marathi debut
2022	Varalaru Mukkiyam	Santhosh Rajan	Tamil	
2022	Aanandam Paramanandam	Shafi	Malayalam	
2022	Shefeekkinte Santhosham	Anup Pandalam	Malayalam	
2023	Ennalum Ente Aliya	Bash Mohammed	Malayalam	Along with William Francis
2023	Oh My Darling	Alfred D Samuel	Malayalam	
2023	Pranaya Vilasam	Nikhil Muraly	Malayalam	
2023	Neymar	Sudhi Maddison	Malayalam	
2023	Kolla	Suraj Varma	Malayalam	
2023	King of Kotha	Abhilash Joshy	Malayalam	Songs only. Score composed by Jakes Bejoy who also composes other songs.
2023	Bullet Diaries	Santhosh Mandoor	Malayalam	
2023	Kannagi	Yashwanth Kishore	Tamil	
2024	Panchavalsara Padhathi	PG Premlal	Malayalam	
2024	Cup	Sanju V Samuel	Malayalam	
2025	Written & Directed by God	Febi George Stonefield	Malayalam	
2025	Paathira Kurbana	Vinay Jose	Malayalam	
2025	Kapp	Sanju V. Samuel	Malayalam	
2025	Karam	Vineeth Sreenivasan	Malayalam	
2025	Bha Bha Ba	Dhananjay Shankar	Malayalam	
2025	Pattapakal	Saajir Sadaf	Malayalam	
2026	Aadu 3	Midhun Manuel Thomas	Malayalam	

=== As Playback singer ===
Shaan Rahmaan is also a singer and has sung songs composed by himself and for music director Deepak Dev in films like Urumi, Teja Bhai & Family etc.

Selected list

Year	Film	Songs	Music director	Language	Notes
2011	Urumi	"Vadakku Vadakku -Friendship Remix"	Deepak Dev	Malayalam	Duet with Guru Kiran
2011	Teja Bhai & Family	"Pranaya Nilaa, Pranaya Nilaa (Remix)"	Deepak Dev	Malayalam	
2012	Idiots	"Chick Chick"	Nandhu Kartha	Malayalam	Co-sung with Jassie Gift and Bijibal
2012	Padmasree Bharat Dr. Saroj Kumar	"Iniyoru Chalanam"	Deepak Dev	Malayalam	Co-sung with Vineeth Sreenivasan
2013	Philips and the Monkey Pen	"It's Just Another Day"	Rahul Subrahmanian	Malayalam	
2015	Aadu	"Kodikayarana Pooramaayi"	Himself	Malayalam	Co-sung with Anwar Sadath
2017	Aadu 2	"Aadeda Aattam Nee"	Himself	Malayalam	
2019	Love Action Drama	"Ponvilakkaayi"	Himself	Malayalam	
2019	Love Action Drama	"Varavaayi"	Himself	Malayalam	
2022	Varalaru Mukkiyam	"Mallu Girl"	Himself	Tamil	Co-sung with Athira A. Nair; lyrics by Madhan Karky

== Awards ==
Year	Award	Song/Film	Notes
2012	SIIMA for Best Music Director	Thattathin Marayathu	
2015	SIIMA for Most Streamed Song of the Year	"Kattu Mooliyo" from Ohm Shanthi Oshaana	
2017	SIIMA for Best Music Director	Velipadinte Pusthakam	
