= Hridayam (film) =

2022 film by Vineeth Sreenivasan

- Theatrical release poster
- Directed by: Vineeth Sreenivasan
- Written by: Vineeth Sreenivasan
- Produced by: Visakh Subramaniam; Noble Babu Thomas
- Starring: Pranav Mohanlal; Kalyani Priyadarshan; Darshana Rajendran
- Cinematography: Viswajith Odukkathil
- Edited by: Ranjan Abraham
- Music by: Hesham Abdul Wahab
- Production companies: Merryland Cinemas; Big Bang Entertainments
- Distributed by: Merryland Cinemas
- Release date: 21 January 2022 (India)
- Running time: 172 minutes
- Country: India
- Language: Malayalam
- Budget: est. ₹5−7 crore
- Box office: est. ₹55 crore

Hridayam (transl. Heart) is a 2022 Indian Malayalam-language coming-of-age romantic drama film written and directed by Vineeth Sreenivasan. It was produced by Visakh Subramaniam under Merryland Cinemas and co-produced by Noble Babu Thomas under Big Bang Entertainments. The film stars Pranav Mohanlal, Kalyani Priyadarshan and Darshana Rajendran. The film's songs and background score were composed by Hesham Abdul Wahab.

Hridayam marks the return of Merryland Studio, one of the earliest film studios in Kerala, into film production. The film reintroduced once obsolete audio cassettes and limited edition vinyl records in India. Principal photography began in February 2020, after taking a break with the surge of COVID-19 pandemic in India, filming was concluded in March 2021. The film was shot at KCG College of Technology in Chennai, where Vineeth, his wife Divya and his friend and actor Aju Varghese studied, and in Palakkad, Kochi, and Andhra Pradesh.

Hridayam was released in theatres worldwide on 21 January 2022. It received generally positive reviews from critics. The film became the 3rd highest grossing Malayalam film of the year. It won two Kerala State Film Awards, including Best Film with Popular Appeal and Aesthetic Value.

== Plot ==
Arun, a teenager from Kerala, enrolls at KCG Tech, an engineering college in Chennai. He falls in love with his classmate, Darshana, at first sight, and the two soon begin a relationship. While accompanying his friend Antony to meet an online girlfriend, Arun becomes attracted to her colleague. He falsely claims he is single and attempts to kiss her, but the two are interrupted by moral police. Consumed by guilt, Arun confesses the incident to Darshana, who furiously terminates their relationship.

Following the breakup, Arun's life spirals downward as he turns to heavy drinking and begins ragging his juniors. He starts dating another student, Maya, but remains unfulfilled. Meanwhile, Darshana briefly dates Kedar, a notorious womanizer, but breaks up with him after discovering his true nature. Noticing their son's decline, Arun's parents intervene, and his father encourages him to quit alcohol and focus on his life. Arun and Antony join their brilliant classmate Selva's peer coaching sessions, successfully turning their academic performance around. Appreciating his positive transformation, Darshana begins to warm up to Arun again. Tragedy strikes when Selva is killed in a bus accident. Shortly after, following her own father's death, Maya breaks up with Arun upon realizing he does not truly love her.

On their final day of college, the students are led to "the secret alley," a room where graduating seniors leave messages for future batches, but a conflicted Arun leaves his space blank. As they prepare to depart, Darshana accompanies Arun to his train and asks if they would still be together had they not fought four years ago, but Arun has no answer. After graduation, Arun briefly takes a corporate job secured through campus placements.

Two years later, deeply dissatisfied with his career, Arun quits his job. Darshana, who has built a successful career as a YouTube vlogger, encourages him to pursue his creative passions. While traveling, Arun meets Jimmy, a wedding photographer who recruits him as a business partner. Together, they launch a photography company specializing in intimate weddings. They gain massive commercial success after securing a promotional shoutout from their former college classmate, Prateek Tiwari, who has become a famous Bollywood singer.

While shooting a wedding, Arun meets Nithya Balagopal and is immediately drawn to her. Impressed by his work, Nithya recommends Arun's team to her cousin for an upcoming wedding. However, Arun realizes the groom is Kedar and exposes his predatory history, prompting the family to call off the wedding. Grateful for his intervention, Nithya grows close to Arun. The two fall in love and eventually marry with their parents' blessings. Darshana attends the reception but leaves in tears, struggling to accept that Arun has moved on. Sometime later, Nithya gives birth to a baby boy. A joyful Arun shares the news with Darshana first and names the child Selva, in honor of his late college friend.

When Darshana's own marriage is arranged, Arun and Nithya travel to Chennai to attend. On the eve of the wedding, Darshana calls Arun, asking him to meet her at the beach where they first confessed their love. Though tempted to slip away in secret, Arun confesses the situation to Nithya, who calmly trusts him and sends him on his way. At the beach, Darshana admits her anxieties about the marriage and repeats her question about whether they would have stayed together if their past had been different. Reflecting on his beautiful life with Nithya and baby Selva, Arun gently reassures her that she, too, will find complete happiness and peace in her new chapter. Comforted, Darshana goes through with her wedding.

On their way to the airport in Chennai, Arun takes a detour to KCG Tech. He obtains the key to the secret alley and finally writes a heartfelt thank-you note to the college for shaping his journey. Content and at peace, he exits the campus to join Nithya and Selva for their journey home.

== Cast ==
- Pranav Mohanlal as Arun Neelakandan
- Kalyani Priyadarshan as Nithya Balagopal, Arun's wife
- Darshana Rajendran as Darshana, Arun's friend and ex-girlfriend
- Aswath Lal as Antony Thadikkaran
- Vijayaraghavan as Neelakandan Menon, Arun's father
- Aju Varghese as Jimmy
- Johny Antony as Balagopal, Nithya's father
- Arun Kurian as Akhil Sathyan
- Annu Antony as Maya Padmanabhan
- Kalesh Ramanand as Selva
- Abishek Joseph George as Kedar Kamalesh
- Noble Babu Thomas as Vishak
- Ann Jameela Saleem as Megha
- Megha Thomas as Jasleen
- Sangeeth Prathap as Baiju
- Linto Joseph as Alexander, Arun's friend
- Shiva Hariharan as Anto Abraham
- Jishnu Sreekumar as Ron Valiyaveettil
- Ajith Thomas Abraham as Lijo
- Kurian Joseph John as Joji Solomon
- Jojo Jose as Prateek Tiwari
- Thushara Pillai as Nithya's mother
- Manjula Mohandas as Nithya's elder sister
- Sankar Induchoodan as Groom
- Sooraj Sun as Bride
- Adithyan Chandrashekar as Joe
- Sanjay Menon as Sandeep Joy
- Kaushik M. V as Kaali
- Raja Rani Pandian as Tea Stall owner
- Atul Ramkumar as Jackson, Arun's Malayali senior
- Ramesh Menon as Farooq
- Vijayakrishnan A. B. as Vijayettan
- Anjali S. Nair as Tamizh Selvi
- Maria Vincent as Diya, Nithya's friend
- Meenakshi Raveendran as Antony's date
- Shaun Romy as Antony's date's friend (cameo appearance)
- Vishak Nair as Andrew, passenger on the train (cameo appearance)
- Mathukkutty as Priest (cameo appearance)

== Production ==
=== Development ===
Hridayam was officially announced in December 2019, set to be produced by Visakh Subramaniam and co-produced by Noble Babu Thomas, starring Pranav Mohanlal, Kalyani Priyadarshan, and Darshana Rajendran, intended to be released during Onam 2020. The film marks the comeback of film studio Merryland Studio into film production after a hiatus of 30 years, under the new company Merryland Cinemas. Vineeth told in an interview that the characters in the film draws inspiration from moments and memories from his and his wife's lives and their friends' from college and life beyond that. According to Vineeth, Hridayam is about a young man named Arun Neelakandan and "tracks his journey right from when he was 17 to 30 years old. We have tried to convey the various highs and lows in his life, his friendships, love, emotional ups and downs, career-related uncertainties, up to the time he is about to be a family man". He described the film as a coming-of-age drama. Talking about how much of his real-life is presented in the film, Vineeth said that it is "based on a lot of incidents that happened during my college life in Chennai. The first half of the film is a cinematic dramatisation of real-life events. Thattathin Marayathu is a campus I am not familiar with. But this is home". About casting Pranav, Vineeth said that he liked him from Aadhi, there was something special about his eyes and smile in it, and that he wanted a charmer rather than an accomplished actor, like Suriya in Vaaranam Aayiram or Logan Lerman in The Perks of Being a Wallflower.

=== Filming ===
The film began principal photography in early February 2020. After a schedule in Kochi, filming was shifted to Kollengode, Palakkad for a two-day schedule. The film's main location was Chennai. Filming was paused in March 2020 due to a 21-day COVID-19 lockdown in India. By then about 50 percent of the film was complete, primarily featuring Pranav and Darshana. Filming was put on hold indefinitely after the surge of COVID-19 pandemic. It was resumed in January 2021. Kalyani joined the sets. Vineeth recalled in an interview that he never saw Pranav reading his dialogues on location as he would have learned it by rote. Significant parts of the film takes place in a college. It was shot at KCG College of Technology in Chennai, where Vineeth and his wife studied. That schedule was concluded in Kochi on 21 January. Vineeth said that Hridayam gave him the most fun working in a film since Thattathin Marayathu. For certain scenes, Rohit [A.D.F Of Mumbai] made the actors listen to music to get them feel the mood of the scene. Another schedule in Chennai was concluded on 11 February, about 95 percent of the film was complete by then. Principal photography was complete by mid-March, with one song remaining to be shot with limited crew. The film, which was originally charted to shoot for 100 days in multiple schedules was able to complete in 60 or more days. The follow-up 5-day song shoot was held in July 2021 in Andhra Pradesh. Post-production of the film was completed by October 2021.

== Music ==
The music for the film was composed by Hesham Abdul Wahab. In early 2020, Vineeth went to Istanbul to record pieces of music for the film. Actor Prithviraj Sukumaran has sung a song for the film. Beside acting, Darshana Rajendran has sung the track "Darshana". The track list was revealed on 21 June 2021 on the occasion of World music day. Audio mastering of the film was completed by September 2021. Audio rights of the movie was acquired by Think Music. Hridayam is bringing back audio cassettes and limited edition vinyl records back to India, which was a dream shared by Vineeth, Hesham, and Think Music executives. Since its production was obsolete in the country, Think Music had to partner with a cassette manufacturer in Japan to import its physical copies to India.

== Release ==
=== Theatrical ===
When the filming was through midway in March 2020, the producers announced that the film will have a theatrical release. In October 2021, it was announced along with the song "Darshana" that the film will have a worldwide theatrical release on 21 January 2022.

=== Home media ===
Disney+ Hotstar acquired the film's post-theatrical digital distribution and premiered on 18 February 2022; the satellite rights were bagged by Asianet.

== Reception ==
=== Box office ===
The film was a commercial success and earned more than ₹50 crore (US$5.2 million) at the box office.

=== Critical response ===
It received generally positive reviews from critics. Rating 3 out of 5 stars, The New Indian Express said that "Vineeth Sreenivasan has structured Hridayam in a way that makes it seem like you're watching two feel-good films for the price of one", and that the film has a therapeutic quality that "makes you feel less embarrassed about the awkward, foolish things you did in the past", and "as a coming-of-age drama, Hridayam is to Vineeth Sreenivasan what Premam was to Alphonse Puthren. (If given a choice, I would easily pick Hridayam over Premam). It's one of those films I wanted to hug once the end credits started rolling", also praised the casting. The Times of India gave a rating of 3.5 on 5 and wrote "Hridayam tries to give a realistic, coming-of-age depiction of a Malayali's campus life in Chennai and those who have done engineering in the city might connect with it the best, thanks to the different moods, flavours and vibes of the city woven into the narrative in a hearty manner ... The movie has an interesting emotional core, brought out by performances of Pranav, Darshana and others, which makes gentle tugs at the viewers' heartstrings". The Week also rated 3.5 out of 5, called it "a coming-of-age drama high on emotions" and stated that "Vineeth Srinivasan is back with a feel-good, new-age drama that most youngsters can relate to ... Arun is safe in the hands of Pranav, who has indeed grown as an actor", also praised the music and cinematography.

The Quint rated the film 2.5 on 5 and wrote that "Hridayam is Vineeth's labour of love, a tribute to his campus life"; the film is "a fun-filled coming-of-age drama set in a typical engineering college campus; of love, break-ups, heartaches and the discovery of life in the process, also spilling over to the next phase of the lives of the protagonists", concluding that "Hridayam is eminently watchable and you are sure to leave cinemas with a lighter heart after watching it". Pinkvilla rated the film 3.5 on 5 and described the film "a marvelously structured memory piece on soul searching", saying "Hridayam is a gigantic, ambitious puzzle of a narrative, built confidently around a certain time in a person's life that informs the type of person that you turn out to be in the future. The screenplay is infused with fifteen songs yet the interlacing works for the nature of the story, a character driven memory piece as opposed to a plot heavy drama". Manorama Online wrote that "there is romance, friendship, heartbreak, pathos, and life in Hridayam. That's Hridayam in very simple terms. A beautiful gift during these trying times ... One can't even visualise any other actor in place of Arun Neelakandan. Pranav has come a long way since his first film. His charm is undeniable. And that's exactly what makes us warm up to Arun Neelakandan".

== Remake ==
In March 2022, Karan Johar announced that his company Dharma Productions along with Fox Star Studios have acquired the remake rights of the film in Hindi, Tamil, Kannada and Telugu languages.

== Legacy ==
The secret alley scene in the movie was spoofed in the 2024 Malayalam movie Premalu directed by Girish AD.

== Accolades ==
Award	Date of Ceremony	Category	Recipient(s)	Result
Kerala State Film Awards	27 May 2022 (Announced Date)	Best Film with Popular Appeal and Aesthetic Value	Producer: Visakh Subramaniam Director: Vineeth Sreenivasan	Won
Kerala State Film Awards	27 May 2022 (Announced Date)	Best Music Director (Songs)	Hesham Abdul Wahab	Won
