= Aju Varghese =

Indian film actor and producer (born 1985)

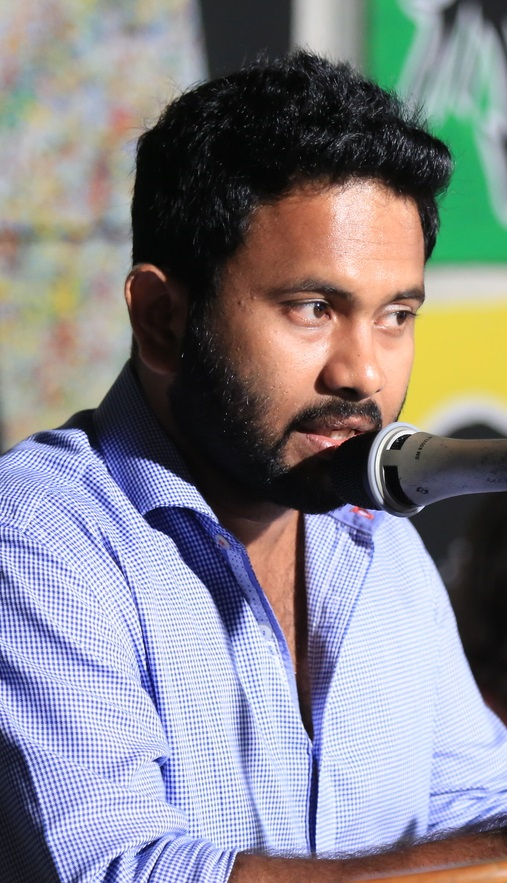
- Aju at SJCET in 2015
- Born: Aju Kurian Varghese; 11 January 1985 (age 41); Thiruvalla, Pathanamthitta district, Kerala
- Occupations: Actor; producer; distributor; singer
- Years active: 2010–present
- Works: Full list
- Spouse: Augustina (m. 2014)

Aju Kurian Varghese (born 11 January 1985) is an Indian actor, producer and singer who appears in Malayalam cinema. He made his debut in 2010 in Malarvadi Arts Club, directed by his collegemate Vineeth Sreenivasan. He has acted in more than 160 films in a career spanning over a decade. He has been critically acclaimed for his comedic role in many films. He owns a production and distribution company named Funtastic Films along with actor Dhyan Sreenivasan and producer Visakh Subramaniam.

== Early life ==
Aju was born at Thiruvalla in the Pathanamthitta district of Kerala to P. K. Varghese and Celin Susan Eason. He has a younger sister named Anju Susan Varghese. He studied at Rajagiri High School in Kalamasserry and at Bhavan's Adarsha Vidyalaya in Kakkanad. He then did his B.Tech. degree in Electronics and Communication Engineering from KCG College of Technology, Chennai. Later, he worked at Sutherland Global Services & HSBC in its HR department in Chennai.

It was during that time he was called by Vineeth Sreenivasan, his college friend, to play one of the lead roles in his directorial debut, Malarvadi Arts Club, and later in Thattathin Marayathu. In the meantime, he was part of Sevenes (2011) by veteran director Joshiy. Since then, he has acted in notable films, such as Thattathin Marayathu, Oru Vadakkan Selfie, Kili Poyi, Zachariyayude Garbhinikal, Ohm Shanthi Oshaana, Punyalan Agarbattis, Vellimoonga, Ormayundo Ee Mukham, Kunjiramayanam, Su.. Su... Sudhi Vathmeekam, Two Countries, Adi Kapyare Kootamani, Oppam, Kodathi Samaksham Balan Vakeel, Love Action Drama, Sarvam Maaya, Vaazha 2, Aadu series and Swargam.

Aju married Augustina on 24 February 2014. The couple had twins, a girl named Juana and a boy named Evan, born on 28 October 2014. They later had a second set of twins: boys named Jake and Luke, born on 30 September 2016.

== Awards and nominations ==
| Year | Award | Category | Film | Result |
|---|---|---|---|---|
| 2011 | Vanitha Film Awards | Best New Face of the Year | Malarvadi Arts Club | Won |
| 2012 | Asiavision Awards | Best Comedian | Thattathin Marayathu | Won |
| 2013 | Indian Movie Awards Qatar | Best Actor in a Comedy Role | Thattathin Marayathu | Won |
| 2013 | 3rd South Indian International Movie Awards | Best Supporting actor in Malayalam | Punyalan Agarbattis | Nominated |
| 2014 | Asiavision Awards | Best Character Role | Ohm Shanthi Oshaana | Won |
| 2015 | Vanitha Film Awards | Best Comedian | Vellimoonga | Won |
| 2015 | 4th South Indian International Movie Awards | Best Comedian in Malayalam | Vellimoonga | Won |
| 2015 | Asianet Comedy Awards | Best Comedy Icon | Oru Vadakkan Selfie | Won |
| 2015 | Asiavision Awards | Best Character Actor in Malayalam | Kunjiramayanam | Won |
| 2016 | 1st IIFA Utsavam | Best Supporting Actor in Malayalam | Oru Vadakkan Selfie | Won |
| 2016 | 1st IIFA Utsavam | Performance in a Comic Role | Oru Vadakkan Selfie | Nominated |
| 2016 | 1st IIFA Utsavam | Performance in a Comic Role | Kunjiramayanam | Nominated |
| 2016 | Asianet Film Awards | Best Actor in Humorous Role | Various films | Won |
| 2016 | Vanitha Film Awards | Best Comedian | Various films | Won |
| 2016 | 5th South Indian International Movie Awards | Best Comedian in Malayalam | Two Countries | Won |
| 2016 | Asianet Comedy Awards | Best Comedy Icon | Two Countries | Won |
| 2016 | Asiavision Awards | Best Supporting Actor | Two Countries | Won |
| 2017 | North American Film Awards | Best Entertainer | Various Films | Won |
| 2017 | Asianet Comedy Awards | Best Combo Award | Lavakusha | Won |
| 2018 | 7th South Indian International Movie Awards | Best Comedian in Malayalam | Godha | Won |
| 2019 | Kerala Kaumudi Flash Movies | Most Popular Supporting Actor | Aravindante Athidhikal | Won |
| 2019 | 8th South Indian International Movie Awards | Best Comedian in Malayalam | Aravindante Athidhikal | Won |
| 2021 | 9th South Indian International Movie Awards | Best Comedian in Malayalam | Love Action Drama | Nominated |
| 2022 | 10th South Indian International Movie Awards | Best Comedian in Malayalam | Minnal Murali | Nominated |
