= Vineeth Sreenivasan =

Indian actor and filmmaker (born 1984)

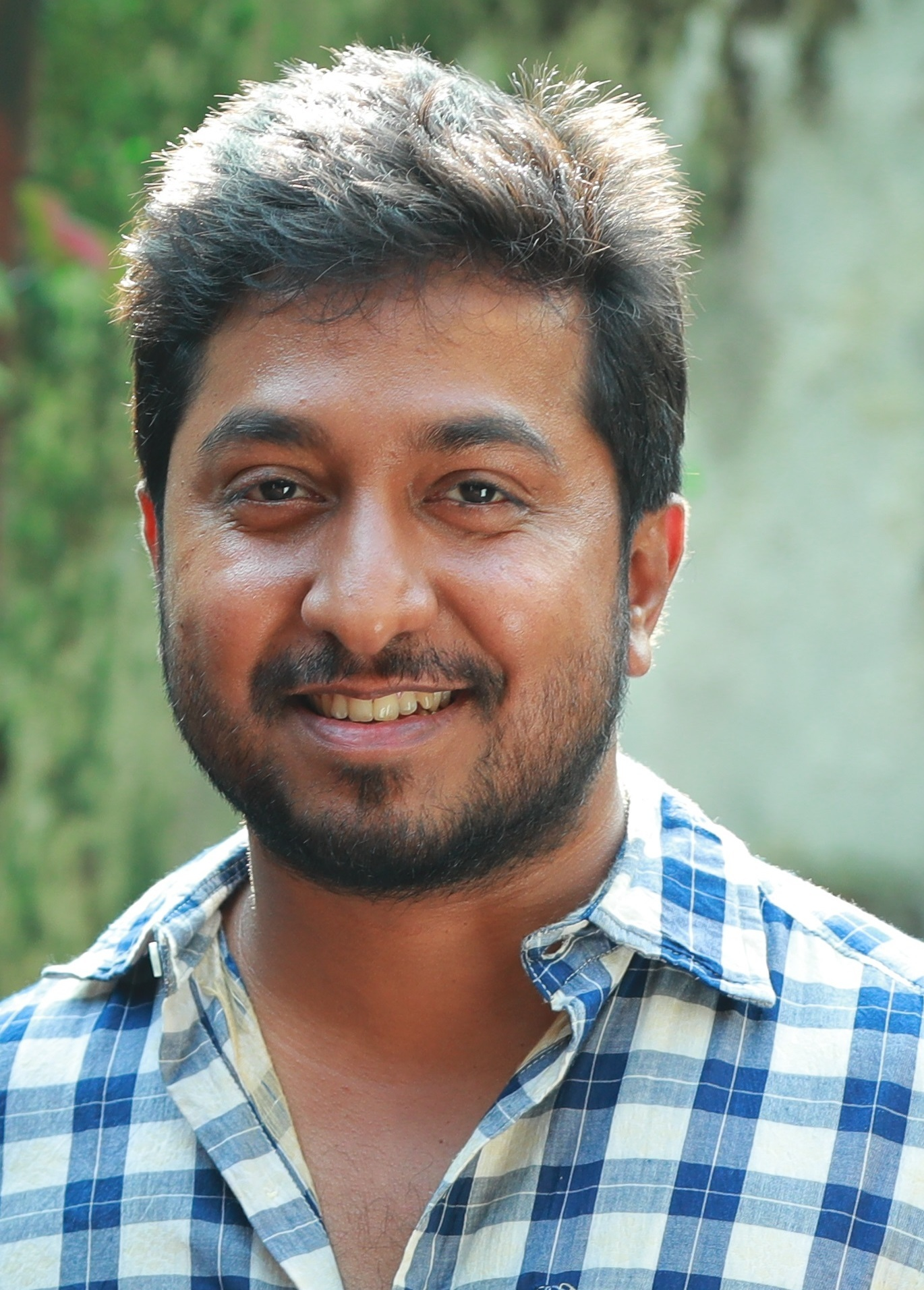
- Vineeth in 2018
- Born: 1 October 1984 (age 42); Kuthuparamba, Kerala, India
- Occupations: Actor; film director; Film Producer; screenwriter; playback singer; lyricist; dubbing artist and Music director
- Years active: 2002–present
- Spouse: Divya Narayanan (m. 2012)
- Children: 2
- Parent: Sreenivasan (Father)
- Relatives: Dhyan Sreenivasan (Brother); M. Mohanan (uncle)
- Musical career
- Genres: Playback singer; filmi
- Instrument: Vocals

Vineeth Sreenivasan (born 1 October 1984) is an Indian actor, director, producer, dubbing artist, screenwriter, playback singer and lyricist who predominantly works in Malayalam cinema. He is the elder son of late veteran actor, director and screenwriter Sreenivasan.

== Early life ==
Vineeth Sreenivasan is the eldest son of late Malayalam screenwriter and actor Sreenivasan and Vimala. His younger brother, Dhyan Sreenivasan is also an actor. He was educated at Rani Jai Higher Secondary School in Kuthuparamba. He graduated in mechanical engineering from KCG College of Technology, Chennai.

== Career ==
=== Acting career ===
He made his acting debut playing one of the main protagonists in the Malayalam film Cycle, which did well at the box office. Following that, he appeared in Makante Achan (2009), acting alongside his father, Sreenivasan.

After these initial roles, Vineeth diversified his acting portfolio—he has performed in dramas, romance-comedies, and thriller-type films. Some of the notable works in his acting career include Traffic (2011), Chappa Kurishu (2011), Om Shanti Oshana (2014), Ormayundo Ee Mukham (2014), Oru Vadakkan Selfie (2015), Kunjiramayanam (2015), Aravindante Athidhikal (2018), Thanneer Mathan Dinangal (2019) etc.

His performance in Mukundan Unni Associates (2022) received huge critical acclaim.

=== Directorial career ===
Malarvadi Arts Club, his directorial debut film, was released in theatres worldwide on 2010. It garnered critical acclaim for its direction, story, screenplay, music, score, and standout performances by the cast. The film also achieved significant commercial success. His second film, Thattathin Marayathu was released in 2012 which earned positive response and was a commercial success. In 2013, he directed the thriller film Thira. Even though the film underperformed at box office, it earned cult following over years. His next directorials were Jacobinte Swargarajyam (2016) and Hridayam (2022), both received positive response and were commercial success. His next film, Varshangalkku Shesham, released in 2024 was opened to mixed reviews but grossed over ₹80 crores from box office making it as highest-grossing film he helmed. His latest release was 2025 film Karam, opened to negative reviews from critics and bombed at box office. It is considered as the weakest film in his filmography as director.

== Discography ==
Some of his popular songs include "Entammede Jimikki Kammal", "Manikya Malaraya Poovi", "Karale Karalinte", "Naran", "Ente Khalbile", "Anuraagathin Velayi", "Nee Pidiyana", "Kaattu Mooliyo", "Aluva Puzhayude", and "Kudukku".

== Personal life ==
Vineeth married Divya Narayanan on 18 October 2012, after an eight-year-long relationship since 30 March 2004. She was his junior at KCG College of Technology in Chennai. The couple have a son, Vihaan Divya Vineeth & daughter Shanaya Divya Vineeth.

Vineeth Sreenivasan with Divya Narayanan at their marriage in 2012.

== Awards and nominations ==
Awards and nominations
Award	Wins	Nominations
Kerala Film Critics Association Awards	5	0
South Indian International Movie Awards	4	4
Asianet Film Awards	4	0

Totals (Note: Certain award groups do not simply award one winner. They acknowledge several different recipients, have runners-up, and have third place. Since this is a specific recognition and is different from losing an award, runner-up mentions are considered wins in this award tally. For simplification and to avoid errors, each award in this list has been presumed to have had a prior nomination.)
- Wins: 23
- Nominations: 6

Award	Year	Category	Film	Result	Ref.
Kerala State Film Awards	2021	Best Film with Popular Appeal and Aesthetic Value	Hridayam	Won	
Kerala Film Critics Association Awards	2015	Best Popular Film	Oru Vadakkan Selfie	Won	
Kerala Film Critics Association Awards	2016	Second Best Film	Jacobinte Swargarajyam	Won	
Kerala Film Critics Association Awards	2016	Best Screenplay	Jacobinte Swargarajyam	Won	
Kerala Film Critics Association Awards	2019	Best Supporting Actor (Male)	Thanneer Mathan Dinangal	Won	
Kerala Film Critics Association Awards	2021	Best Popular Film	Hridayam	Won	
South Indian International Movie Awards	2012	Best Director (Malayalam)	Thattathin Marayathu	Nominated	
South Indian International Movie Awards	2012	Best Male Playback Singer (Malayalam)	Thattathin Marayathu	Nominated	
South Indian International Movie Awards	2014	Best Male Playback Singer (Malayalam)	Om Shanti Oshana	Won	
South Indian International Movie Awards	2015	Best Actor in a Supporting Role (Malayalam)	Oru Vadakkan Selfie	Nominated	
South Indian International Movie Awards	2015	Best Male Playback Singer (Malayalam)	Premam	Nominated	
South Indian International Movie Awards	2016	Best Director (Malayalam)	Jacobinte Swargarajyam	Nominated	
South Indian International Movie Awards	2017	Best Male Playback Singer (Malayalam)	Cappucino	Won	
South Indian International Movie Awards	2022	Best Film (Malayalam)	Hridayam	Nominated	
South Indian International Movie Awards	2022	Best Director (Malayalam)	Hridayam	Won	
South Indian International Movie Awards	2022	Best Actor in a Negative Role (Malayalam)	Mukundan Unni Associates	Won	
Vanitha Film Awards	2015	Best Male Playback Singer	Om Shanti Oshana	Won	
Vanitha Film Awards	2019	Best Star Pair (shared with Nikhila Vimal)	Aravindante Athidhikal	Won	
Asianet Comedy Awards	2016	All Rounder of the year	Various Films	Won	
Asianet Film Awards	2012	Multi Faced Talent	Thattathin Marayathu	Won	
Asianet Film Awards	2014	Best Star Pair (shared with Namitha Pramod)	Ormayundo Ee Mukham	Won	
Asianet Film Awards	2015	Best Performer of the Year	Various Films	Won	
Asianet Film Awards	2017	Youth Icon of the Year		Won	
Asiavision Awards	2012	Man Of The Year	Thattathin Marayathu	Won	
Asiavision Awards	2012	Popular Movie	Thattathin Marayathu	Won	
Asiavision Awards	2013	Socially Committed Movie	Thira	Won	
Asiavision Awards	2015	Best Playback singer	Premam	Won	
Asiavision Awards	2016	Best Film	Jacobinte Swargarajyam	Won	
Asiavision Awards	2017	Popular Singer	Velipadinte Pusthakam	Won	
