= Dhanya Varma =

Indian journalist and talk show host

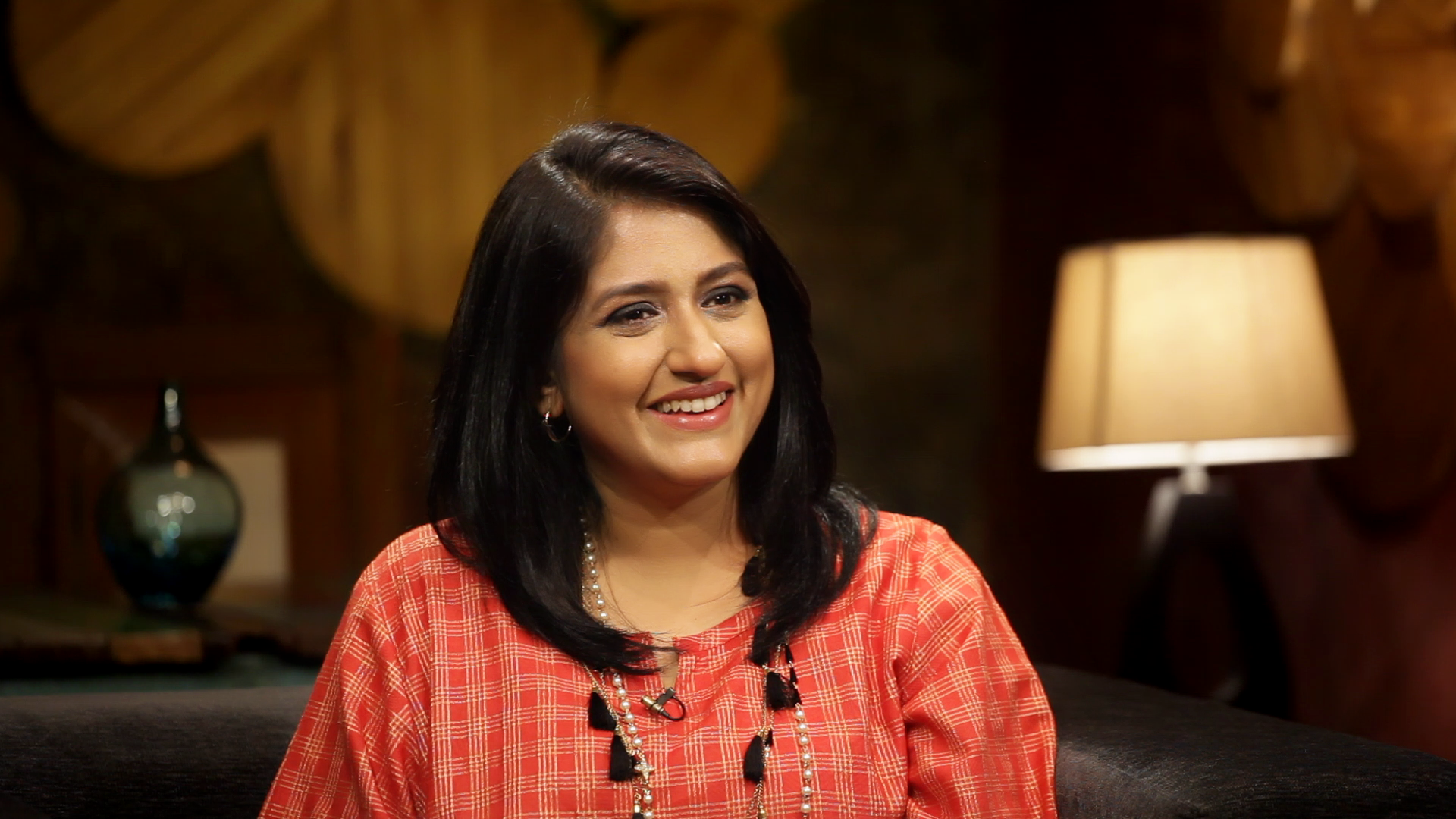
- Dhanya Varma
- Born: Thiruvalla, Kerala, India
- Occupations: Journalist; Talk Show host
- Spouse: Commander Vijay Varma
- Children: 3

Dhanya Varma is an Indian journalist and talk show host who hosted the Malayalam talk show The Happiness Project, on Kappa TV. Currently, she hosts the talk show I AM with Dhany Varma.

== Personal life ==
She hails from Thiruvalla. She is married to Cdr Vijay Varma, an officer in the Indian Navy and has 2 daughters and a son.

== Education ==
She completed a master's degree in communication from Pune University in 2001.

== Career ==
She started her career with an internship at Star Plus after completing her studies, and later became an assistant producer on the TV show Kaun Banega Crorepati hosted by Amitabh Bachchan. She later hosted a talk show called Talking point on Rosebowl, which aired from 2009 - 2011. She also hosted the show Mammootty the Best Actor show on Asianet. She was also a Hindi newsreader on Star News and has hosted a show called Wah! Cricket. She also acted in the movie Humans of Someone directed by Sumesh Lal. The movie premiered at the International Film Festival of Kerala 2018. She is also the host of The Happiness Project with Dhanya Varma, with guests including celebrities and movie stars like Indrajith Sukumaran, Sunny Wayne, Lena, Anoop Menon, Industrialist Kochouseph Chittilappilly, Oncologist V. P. Gangadharan, Conservation photographer Balan Madhavan, Psychiatrist Dr. Manoj Kumar, Cinematographer Venu among others.

== Filmography ==
- Humans of Someone (2018) as Alice
- Pathinettam Padi (2019) as Dhanu
- Sara's (2021) as Dr Sandhya Philip
