= Rajini Chandy =

Indian actress

- Born: Aluva, Kerala, India
- Education: Alphonsa College, Palai
- Occupation: Actress
- Years active: 2016–present

Rajini Chandy is an Indian actress who works primarily in Malayalam cinema. She debuted in 2016 Malayalam film Oru Muthassi Gadha by Jude Anthany Joseph. In 2020, she participated in the reality show Bigg Boss Malayalam season 2 and she got evicted in the 14th day.

== Early life and education ==
Rajini Chandy was born in Aluva, Kerala. After schooling she went to Alphonsa College, Palai for her degree course. Rajini is married to PV Chandy and then settled in Mumbai. They have a daughter settled in California with her husband and kids.

In 2020, Rajini Chandy created a chat and cook channel on YouTube.

A photoshoot done by Rajini Chandy went viral and which got featured on BBC News.

== Filmography ==
Key
†	Denotes films that have not yet been released

Year	Title	Role	Notes	Ref.
2015	Premam	George David's mother	Voice only	
2016	Oru Muthassi Gadha	Leelamma		
2016	Vaal Nakshathram	Eliyamma	Short film	
2017	Meet Old People	Herself	Web Series	for TLY Talkies
2017	Gandhinagaril Unniyarcha	Unni Archa		
2019	The Gambler	House owner Teacher		
2020	Mother's Love	Emil's mother	Short film	
2021	Boeing Boeing	Rebecca	Web Series	
2021	Aanum Pennum	Augustine's wife	Anthology movie Segment : "Rachiyamma"	
2022	Kathir	Savithri	Tamil debut	
2022	Eesho	Court Judge		
2023	Mr. Hacker			
TBA	Idukki Blasters †	Umma		

== Television ==
Year	Title	Role	channel	Notes
2017	Malayali Veettamma	Mentor	Flowers TV	reality show
2017	Atham 10 Ruchi	Promo host	Mazhavil Manorama	Cookery show
2017 - 2018	Avaril Oral	Subhadramma	Surya TV	Serial
2020	Bigg Boss (Malayalam season 2)	Contestant	Asianet	reality show
2021	Ammamarude Samsthana Sammelanam	Performer	flowers TV	Special show
2023	Onnannara Ruchi	Presenter	Zee Keralam	cookery show
2023- 2024	Balanum Ramayum	Ekkavumamma	Mazhavil Manorama	Serial

== Advertisements ==
- Bhima Jewellery
