= Bun Butter Jam =

2025 Indian film

- Theatrical release poster
- Directed by: Raghav Mirdath
- Written by: Raghav Mirdath
- Produced by: Suresh Subramanian
- Starring: Raju Jeyamohan; Aadhiya Prasad; Bhavya Trikha
- Cinematography: Babu Kumar IE
- Edited by: John Abraham
- Music by: Nivas K. Prasanna
- Production company: Rain of Arrows Entertainment
- Release date: 18 July 2025
- Running time: 148 minutes
- Country: India
- Language: Tamil

Bun Butter Jam is a 2025 Indian Tamil-language romantic comedy film written and directed by Raghav Mirdath. The film stars Raju Jeyamohan, Aadhiya Prasad and Bhavya Trikha in the lead roles alongside Vikranth, Saranya Ponvannan, Devadarshini, Charle, Michael Thangadurai and others in supporting roles. The film has music composed by Nivas K. Prasanna, cinematography handled by Babu Kumar IE and editing done by John Abraham.

Bun Butter Jam released in theatres on 18 July 2025 to mixed reviews. Despite the criticism from the critics, the audience praised the engaging screenplay and mentioned worth the watch. Later, it gained popularity by word of mouth.

== Plot ==
Two determined mothers join forces to secretly set up their son and daughter, using witty tactics and emotional manipulation. Their matchmaking mission unfolds with humor and clever deception, but as the plan progresses, unexpected emotions and real-life complexities challenge their carefully crafted strategy leading to heartwarming surprises and personal revelations.

== Cast ==
- Raju Jeyamohan as Chandru Senthamizhan
- Aadhiya Prasad as Madhumitha (Madhu)
- Bhavya Trikha as Nandhini
- Vikranth as Selva, Chandru’s college senior
- Saranya Ponvannan as Lalitha, Chandru’s mother
- Devadarshini as Uma, Madhumitha’s mother
- Charle as Kumar Senthamizhan, Chandru’s father
- Michael Thangadurai as Saravanan Paranthaman
- VJ Pappu as Akash (A-kash)

== Production ==
On 30 June 2024, Raghav Mirdath who had earlier directed Kaalangalil Aval Vasantham (2022), written dialogues for Size Zero (2015) and screenplay-dialogues for the National award-winning film Baaram (2020) announced his next project titled Bun Butter Jam. On July 2, 2024, on the occasion of Bigg Boss Tamil Season 5 title winner Raju Jeyamohan's 32nd birthday, the announcement of his debut as the lead role in the film was made, who was earlier seen in Natpuna Ennanu Theriyuma (2019), Murungakkai Chips (2021) and Don (2022) in supporting roles. The film features Aadhiya Prasad who was last seen in Karnan Napoleon Bhagath Singh (2024) and Bhavya Trikha who is known for her role in Joe (2023) and last seen in Idi Minnal Kadhal (2024) as the female leads.

Principal photography took place in areas around Chennai. The technical team consists of music composer Nivas K. Prasanna, cinematographer Babu Kumar IE and editor John Abraham.

== Music ==
Bun Butter Jam

Soundtrack album by Nivas K. Prasanna
- Genre: Feature film soundtrack
- Language: Tamil
- Label: Sony Music
- Producer: Nivas K. Prasanna

Nivas K. Prasanna chronology
Sumo (2025)	Bun Butter Jam (2025)	Bison Kaalamaadan (2025)

Singles from Bun Butter Jam
- 1. "Etho Pesathane" Released: 18 January 2025; 2. "Diya Diya" Released: 12 May 2025; 3. "Kaajuma" Released: 9 July 2025

The music and soundtrack is composed by Nivas K. Prasanna. The audio rights were acquired by Sony Music. The first single "Etho Pesathane" written by Vijay Sethupathi in his debut and vocals by Siddharth and Shilpa Rao released on 18 January 2025. The second single "Diya Diya" released on 12 May 2025. The third video single titled "Kaajuma" featuring Nivas K. Prasanna and Aditi Shankar was released on 9 July 2025.

Track listing
No.	Title	Lyrics	Singer(s)	Length
1.	"Diya Diya"	Karthik Netha	Sid Sriram & Nivas K. Prasanna	4:44
2.	"Etho Pesathane"	Vijay Sethupathi	Siddharth & Shilpa Rao	3:11
3.	"Kaajuma"	M K Balaji	Nivas K. Prasanna & Aditi Shankar	4:21
4.	"Vaanavilley"	Saras Menon & Mohan Rajan	Nivas K. Prasanna & Pragathi Guruprasad	4:27
5.	"Vali Thaano Kaadhal"	Vijay Sethupathi	Nivas K. Prasanna	4:22
6.	"Oli Thedi"	Jeyachandra Hashmi	Pragathi Guruprasad	2:44
7.	"Give Me Some Butter Jam"	Saraswathi Menon	Nivas K. Prasanna	0:40
Total length:				24:31

== Release ==
=== Theatrical ===
Bun Butter Jam released in theatres on 18 July 2025.

== Reception ==
=== Critical response ===
Abhinav Subramanian of The Times of India gave 2.5/5 stars and wrote "Bun Butter Jam is another film that aims to connect with today's youth, but it feels forced. Watchable in parts." Rohini M of Cinema Express gave 2.5/5 stars and wrote "Overall, Bun Butter Jam feels like a film made for today’s youth, particularly those in the 2K and Alpha categories, reflecting themes of friendship and love that resonate with them. Barring a few questionable scenes, the film is largely family-friendly."
