= Yasmin Ponnappa =

Indian model

- Born: Bangalore, India
- Occupations: Model, actress
- Years active: 2011-present

Yasmin Ponnappa is an Indian model and actress from Bangalore. After appearing in print media and television commercials, Yasmin first worked as an actress in Thiagarajan Kumararaja's gangster film Aaranya Kaandam (2011).

== Career ==
Yasmin Ponnappa began her career as a model in Bangalore, before shifting to Mumbai to seek better opportunities. She landed a contract with the Elite Model Management agency, and initially appeared in commercials for Nivea Deodorant and Tropicana juice. She later garnered attention for her work with Opulex diamond bracelets, under the direction of Vishesh Verma. During her time as a model, Yasmin was shortlisted by Loveleen Tandan for the role of Latika in Danny Boyle's English film Slumdog Millionaire (2008), as she was previously known to Tandan from another shelved film project. Yasmin took part in initial script reading sessions with Boyle, before she was replaced by Freida Pinto in the role.

Yasmin later made her acting debut in Thiagarajan Kumararaja's Tamil gangster film Aaranya Kaandam (2011), after being approached by the director who had spotted her face on a hoarding in Chennai. Once she was on board, Yasmin prepared for her role under the tutelage of Guru Somasundaram in a ten-day workshop. The film narrates the tale of a drug lord Singaperumal, played by Jackie Shroff, who is well past his prime and imprisons the young Subbu, played by Yasmin and abuses her at will, eager as he is to prove his potency. The film was honoured with two National Film Awards for Best Editing and Best Debut Film of a Director category respectively. Yasmin won rave reviews for her portrayal of Subbu, with Sify.com stating she "is fantastic in her debut role" and "she brings out the innocence and the cunning cruelty of the character very well". Likewise, Rediff.com noted "Yasmin Ponnappa makes you gnash her teeth as the dumb blonde but it's a measure of her success that you feel the exasperation". Later entertainment portals Fully Filmy and Behindwoods both listed Yasmin's role in the film as amongst the strongest female characters ever written in Tamil cinema.

In August 2014, Yasmin shot for a music video titled "The Madras Song", produced by the Murugappa Group as a tribute to the city of Madras, which was celebrating its 375th year. In 2017, Yasmin worked on a short film titled Kalki directed by Dhilip Kumar and co-starring Kishore. Scripted by Baradwaj Rangan, the short film featured her in dual roles of Kalki and Radhika and was released in May 2017.

== Filmography ==
Year	Film	Role	Notes
2011	Aaranya Kaandam	Subbu	
2017	Kalki	Kalki & Radhika	short film
2024	Idi Minnal Kadhal	Anjali	
