= Madras Day =

Annual festival held in Tamil Nadu, India

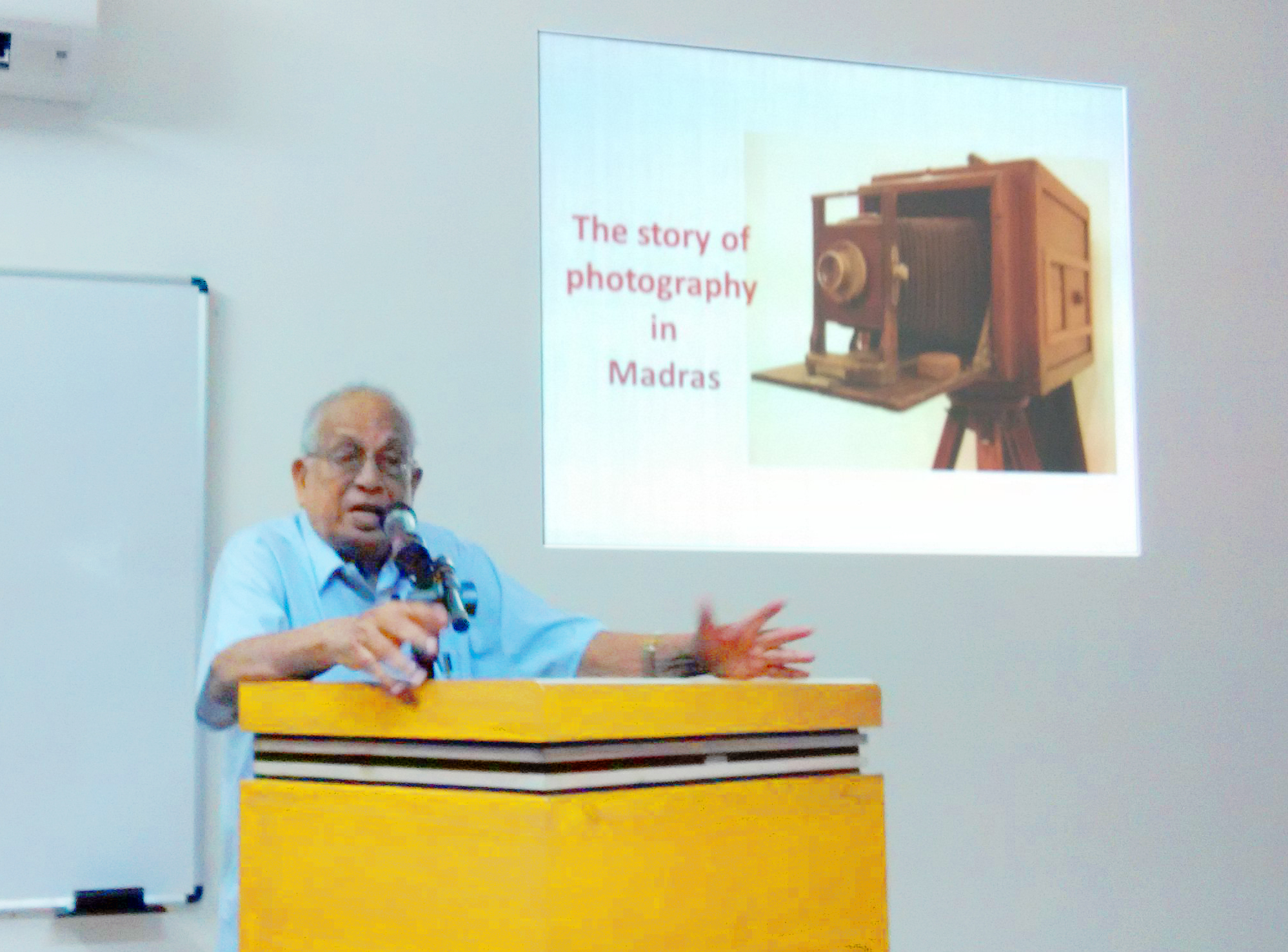
Chennai historian S. Muthiah delivering a lecture on The Story of Photography in Madras at the Press Institute of India as a part of Madras Day 2015 celebrations

Madras Day is a festival organised to commemorate the founding of the city of Madras in Tamil Nadu, India. It is celebrated on 22 August every year, 22 August 1639 being the widely agreed date for the purchase of the village of Madraspatnam or Chennapatnam by East India Company factors Andrew Cogan and Francis Day from Damarla Venkatadri Nayaka, the viceroy of the Vijayanagar Empire.

The idea of a Madras Day was first suggested by Chennai-based journalists Vincent D'Souza, editor, Mylapore Times (a local newspaper) and Sashi Nair, director and editor, Press Institute of India, to historian S. Muthiah during a conversation at Muthiah's home in 2004. Since then, Madras Day celebrations have been held every year without fail, its highlights being exhibitions, lectures, film screenings and quizzes. The Madras Day festival has registered a steady increase in popularity year after year. Between 2014 and 2019, the editions lasted through August and extended into September as well, with more than 120-odd programmes, prompting demands to rename Madras Day as Madras Week, or even Madras Month.

There has been a contention that the deed of purchase was actually dated 22 July 1639 and not 22 August.

== History of Madras Day ==
The first recorded celebration of the founding of Madras was its tercentenary commemoration in 1939. Unlike later anniversaries, the celebrations were officially sponsored by the British government and a special tercentenary commemoration volume was issued with essays on the different aspects of Madras city authored by leading experts of the time. An exhibition of pictures, portraits, maps, records and coins was inaugurated by Diwan Bahadur S. E. Runganadhan, the Vice-Chancellor of the Madras University and a short play writing competition was organised.

The 350th anniversary in 1989 was celebrated with the opening of a commemorative monument titled "Madras 350" built in the Classical Style by builder Frankpet Fernandez at the junction of the Poonamallee High Road and the New Avadi Road. Other major events included the commissioning of a book by S. Muthiah titled Madras — The Gracious City by the Murugappa Group which also organised the first Madras Quiz which has continued to the present day.

The idea to celebrate the birth of the city every year was born when journalists Shashi Nair and Vincent D'Souza met S. Muthiah at his residence for coffee. It was based on the success of another event called Mylapore Festival which D'Souza had been organising every year in January. It was decided by the trio to start celebrating Madras Day from 2004. According to them, the "primary motive of celebrating 'Madras Day' was to focus on the city, its past and its present." The idea initially started off with about five events in 2004 but grew gradually. The second edition in 2005 had events throughout the week. In 2008, there were a total of 60 events conducted. In 2007, a commemorative postal cover was released by Chief Postmaster-General of Tamil Nadu Circle at a function at Fort St George as a part of the Madras Day celebrations, thereby inaugurating a tradition that continued through the later editions. The 2010 celebrations lasted beyond a week and extended well into the following week as well.

The 375th Madras Day was celebrated with more than a hundred events that lasted from 10 August to 14 September 2014. However, despite expectations to the contrary, Tamil Nadu government departments did not participate in the celebrations which they felt "colonial heritage". The celebrations were deemed a roaring success and the events got nationwide coverage for the first time. "The Madras Song" was composed to commemorate the occasion and a website was launched by The Hindu titled friendsofchennai.com for residents of the city to create online petitions voicing their civic grievances. Historian and entrepreneur V. Sriram also designed a mobile app named Chennai Past Forward for users to keep in track with the heritage of the city.

The 376th Madras Day celebrations were bigger with events being held even in suburbs like Tambaram. Apart from heritage walks, the 2015 edition also included a walk of the L. V. Prasad film studios. The focus was, however, on restoration of the Coovum River and a presentation on the history and heritage of the Coovum River was held at the Madras Literary Society by author Anusha Venkatesh on 15 August. The Cycling Yogis, a Chennai cyclists' group, conducted a 72 km bicycle ride along with the Coovum River on 16 August 2015.

The 377th Madras Day celebrations were kick-started in a grand manner by The Hindu Group through their Madras Beats 2016 song. Composed and performed by Opus g7, a band which was selected as winner through a competition floated by The Hindu, the song "Endrum Padhinaaru" was launched on 21 August 2016 and went viral on social media.

== The celebration ==
Madras Day focuses on the city, its history, its past and its present and the core team of catalysts motivates communities, groups, companies and campuses in the city to host events that celebrate the city. The celebration consists of events such as heritage walks, public talks, exhibitions, poetry reading sessions, public performances, food festivals and special programs on local radio. It also includes contests such as T-shirt designing, documentary film contest, multimedia presentation for schools and quizzes in both Tamil and English. T-shirts to mark the event are also released. The talks delivered to mark the week-long celebrations usually involve lectures explaining the heritage and history of the city. There are also events for the retired citizens where they can post about their life years ago on the "Stories about Madras section" on Madras Day's website and share their views on how Madras grew into the Chennai of today.

The programmes for Madras Day 2015 included:

- Heritage walks organised by the Chennai Heritage foundation
- Quizzes and competitions for children organised by the British Council
- Daily lectures organised by the Roja Muthiah Research Library
- Daily lectures organised by the Press Institute of India
- Tree walks by the Nizhal Foundation
- Field trips by the Madras Naturalists' Society
- Lectures and exhibitions organised by The C. P. Ramaswami Aiyar Foundation
- Competitions organised by the Photographic Society of Madras

A unique design T-shirt, selected through open competition, is sold by Mylapore Times every year during Madras Week.

== Controversy regarding the date ==
There has been a controversy regarding the exact day when Madras was handed over to the British East India Company's Francis Day and Andrew Cogan between the dates 22 July and 22 August. The controversy arose since the agreement documents dates the records to 22 July 1639 rather than 22 August of that year. It is often stated that Francis Day and Andrew Cogan did not arrive at the Madras coast until 27 July 1639. The evidence comes from writings of Henry Davison Love, whose monumental three-volume history Vestiges of Old Madras, 1640–1800 is a prime reference source for Madras' early history, which states that "The Naik's grant, erroneously styled a farman, which was probably drafted by Day, was delivered to Andrew Cogan at Masulipatam on September 3, 1639... Three copies are extant ... all of which are endorsed by Cogan. Only the last bears a date, 22 July 1639, where July is probably a slip for August, since Day did not reach Madras until 27 July".
