= Ram c/o Anandhi =

2020 novel by Akhil P. Dharmajan

- Author: Akhil P. Dharmajan
- Translator: Haritha C. K.
- Language: Malayalam
- Genre: Romance
- Publisher: DC Books (Malayalam); HarperCollins India (English)
- Publication date: 2020 (Malayalam); 2025 (English)
- Publication place: India
- Pages: 320 (Malayalam); 332 (English)
- Awards: Sahitya Akademi Yuva Puraskar (2025)

Ram c/o Anandhi is a Malayalam-language contemporary romance novel written by Indian author Akhil P. Dharmajan. It was first published by DC Books in 2020. The novel gained popularity for its emotional storytelling, vibrant characters, and cinematic narrative style. The English translation by Haritha C. K. was published by HarperCollins India in 2025.

== Plot ==
The novel revolves around Sriram (Ram), a young aspiring filmmaker from Alleppey, who moves to Chennai to pursue his dreams. He stays in a mansion run by an old woman, where he meets Anandhi, a spirited receptionist. What begins as friction turns into a deep, meaningful bond. The story also features characters like Malli, a transgender woman, and explores the found-family dynamic among residents of the mansion.

== Author ==
The novel is written by Akhil P. Dharmajan, born in Pathirappally in Alappuzha district, Kerala, is a writer and screenwriter. He holds a diploma in mechanical engineering and a background in film direction. Apart from novels like Ojobord and Mercury Island, he co-wrote the screenplay of the Malayalam film 2018.

== Reception ==
The novel was well received for its cinematic storytelling, character development, and emotionally engaging plot. Many reviewers praised its authentic portrayal of South Indian life and its sensitive handling of gender identity. As of April 2024 , the novel has sold over 1.3 lakh copies. By November 2024 it reached sale of more than 3 lakhs copies.

== Awards ==
In June 2025, Ram c/o Anandhi won the Sahitya Akademi Yuva Puraskar in the Malayalam category.

== Film adaptation ==
In 2023, it was announced that Ram c/o Anandhi would be adapted into a feature film in both Malayalam and Tamil. The film is set to be directed by debutante Anusha Pillai, who previously worked as an assistant director with Kamal Haasan, and produced by Vignesh Kumar through Wealth Eye Cinemas. Pranav Mohanlal and Sai Pallavi were being considered for the title roles.

At the 43rd Sharjah International Book Fair (SIBF) in 2024, Akhil revealed that he personally prefers Pranav and Pallavi as Ram and Anandhi, although the final decision rests with the director. He also stated that he would not be involved in screenwriting but would take part in creative discussions.

== Controversy ==
Following the novel's commercial success, it faced widespread piracy. Within weeks of its popularity surge in early 2024, pirated PDF versions of the novel were widely circulated on social media and messaging platforms. The publishers and author publicly condemned the act, stating it severely impacted earnings and undermined the efforts of regional writers.

In June 2025, the novel's win of the Sahitya Akademi Yuva Puraskar drew mixed reactions from literary circles. Some critics argued that the novel leaned heavily on pop-culture appeal and cinematic style, and questioned whether it met the literary depth typically associated with Akademi honors. Others, however, defended the choice, citing its accessibility, cultural impact, and representation of modern urban narratives in Malayalam literature.
