= Akhil P. Dharmajan =

Indian Malayalam language writer

- Born: 1993 (age 32–33); Pathirappally in Alappuzha district, Kerala
- Occupation: Novelist
- Writing career
- Notable work: Ram c/o Anandhi
- Notable awards: Yuva Puraskar (2025)

Akhil P. Dharmajan is a writer from Kerala, India. His book Ram c/o Anandhi won the Sahitya Akademi Yuva Puraskar in 2025.

== Biography ==
Akhil was born in 1993 in Pathirapalli, Alappuzha district, to K. V. Dharmajan and Maheshwari. He studied at Alappuzha S.D.V. School, Pathirapalli V.V.S.D. LP. School-U.P. School, Mary Immaculate High School Poonkavu, and Holy Family H.S.S. Kattoor. He has a diploma in mechanical engineering and filmmaking.

== Literary contribution ==
Akhil started writing novel at the age of eighteen. He gained attention among Malayalam readers on social media with the release of his first book, Ouija board. The release of Ouija board was held at a crematorium.

The second book, Mercury Island, was released at Pathiramanal island in Alappuzha. The first two books were self-published.

In the case of his first book, Ouija board, he self-published it because the publishers he had commissioned to print it cheated him. Since he was in financial difficulty, he first printed it by giving money collected by his friends to a publisher. Although they say that they printed a thousand copies, they did not give Akhil the author's copy or any remuneration for it. Following this, he started a publishing venture called Katha and published the book he had written.

Akhil is a Malayalam-language writer. His works include the novel Ram C/O Anandhi, published by DC Books. Set in the city of Chennai, it was released at the Chennai Railway Station during Covid 19 period. This book has been very popular on social media in Kerala and among Kerala teenagers. The novel's plot revolves around the lives of Ram and Anandhi, their jokes, moments of love, and their separation. Some parts of this novel have been included in the revised syllabus of the B.A. Malayalam course of Calicut and M.G. Universities. Ram C/o Anandhi is also translated to English by Haritha C.K.

His fourth novel Rathri 12 nu Sesham (meaning: After 12 at Night), released in May 2025, was released at midnight at a Public Crematorium.

Akhil is also the co-scriptwriter (with Jude) for the film 2018, directed by Jude Anthany Joseph.

== Awards ==
- Sahitya Akademi Yuva Puraskar in 2025
