= Sara's =

2021 Indian Malayalam-language film

- Official release poster
- Directed by: Jude Anthany Joseph
- Written by: Akshay Hareesh
- Produced by: P. K. Murali Dharan; Santha Murali
- Starring: Anna Ben; Sunny Wayne
- Cinematography: Nimish Ravi
- Edited by: Riyas K. Badhar
- Music by: Shaan Rahman
- Production company: Anantha Visions
- Distributed by: Amazon Prime Video
- Release date: 5 July 2021
- Running time: 118 minutes
- Country: India
- Language: Malayalam

Sara's (stylized as Sara'S) is a 2021 Indian Malayalam-language romantic comedy film directed by Jude Anthany Joseph and written by Akshay Hareesh, starring Anna Ben and Sunny Wayne in lead roles. The film features music composed by Shaan Rahman, cinematography by Nimish Ravi, and editing by Riyas K. Badhar. The film released directly through Amazon Prime Video on 5 July 2021.

== Plot ==
Sara Vincent is a girl in her mid-20s who has no desire of giving birth to a child. Working as an assistant director in the film industry, her biggest dream is to become a freelance director. She marries Jeevan Philip, a guy in his early 30's, who is in line with her vision of not having a child. The film then goes on to tell of the challenges and crises that befell Sara in her life and work.

== Cast ==
- Anna Ben as Sara Vincent
- Sunny Wayne as Jeevan Philip
- Benny P. Nayarambalam as Vincent
- Mallika Sukumaran as Reethamma Philip, Jeevan's mother
- Prasanth Nair IAS as Producer Sandeep
- Sreelakshmi Haridas as Sara's classmate
- Dhanya Varma as Dr Sandhya Philip
- Siddique as Doctor Hafiz
- Vijayakumar as Divakaran
- Harikrishnan as Arjun
- Srindaa as Lissy (mother of 4 kids)
- Jibu Jacob as Producer
- Kottayam Pradeep as Producer
- Tushara as Molly
- Margareet as Gayathri
- Vriddhi Vishal as Isha
- Siju Wilson as Rahul
- Althaf Manaf as Sara's school love interest
- Aju Varghese as Lissy's Husband (Cameo Appearance)
- Shaan Rahman as himself (Cameo Appearance)
- Vineeth Sreenivasan as himself (Cameo Appearance)
- Smruthi Anish as pregnant lady in movie theatre.

== Production ==
=== Development ===
After the success of Oru Muthassi Gadha (2016), Jude Anthany Joseph began working on two scripts: the one being titled Detective Prabhakaran based on the works of renowned writer G. R. Indugopan, and other one is 2403 ft, based on the 2018 Kerala floods and had featured an ensemble cast with Tovino Thomas and Tanvi Ram in the lead roles. The project went into floors in October 2019 and two schedules had been completed until early 2020. Due to the COVID-19 pandemic lockdown in India, the progress of both the films had been affected and both required a huge film crew and expenses, which could not be made due to the lockdown. As a result, Joseph temporarily halted the projects and later worked on a new film with the title Sara's. Anna Ben and Sunny Wayne were roped in to play leading roles, the former playing the titular character Sara, an associate director who is struggling to do her first project. The title, as mentioned by Joseph, referred to her decisions and story. He planned to address a "serious and relevant content based on childbirth, unlike his previous films which explained the "core message in an entertaining way". Anna Ben's real-life father and scriptwriter Benny P. Nayarambalam assigned to play the character of her on-screen father.

=== Filming ===
Principal shooting of the film began in mid-October 2020 after restrictions from COVID-19 lockdown were lifted. Unlike other Malayalam films which were shot in contained locations, the film was shot in Kochi Metro, a mall in Edappally, Wagamon and other prime sites in Kochi as its main location and was completed in December 2020. Joseph revealed that "When the story was first narrated to me, it only had a girl's house and school as the key locales. But we wanted to magnify that scope. Cinematographer Nimish Ravi is someone who wants his frames to be visually striking and so when a scene comes up, I would suggest why don't we shoot this on a boat or a metro, and he would gladly agree. So, that's how the film took its final form".

He added that the shooting was "fraught with risk" and the team found it as "challenging" filming after the pandemic. Joseph added that "when the shooting took place, the people in the background shouldn't be wearing masks. So, the junior artistes had their masks off which was risky because even if one person got infected, it would be a danger to all. Also, by stroke of luck, when we were filming in few locations, in our wide-angle shots, there weren't any people wearing masks in the frames of the film". Joseph being a paranoid about COVID-19, had ensured about following the necessary safety restrictions that to be followed during the time of crisis. He added "when other films went on floors, I thought we could also do a small movie. The pandemic will be over soon, but when people watch my movie in the later years, they shouldn't feel that it was made under restrictions. That could be one of the reasons why Sara's is shot in such a way".

== Music ==
Sara's

Soundtrack album by Shaan Rahman
- Released: 30 June 2021
- Venues: My Studio, Kochi
- Genre: Feature film soundtrack
- Length: 9:55
- Language: Malayalam
- Label: Satyam Audios
- Producer: Shaan Rahman

Shaan Rahman chronology
Helen (2019)	Sara's (2021)	Minnal Murali (2021)

The film's soundtrack and score is composed by Shaan Rahman in his third collaboration with the director Jude Anthany Joseph after Ohm Shanti Oshanaa and Oru Muthassi Gadha. Lyrics for the songs were penned by written by Manu Manjith, Joe Paul and Shaan Rahman. Vineeth Sreenivasan's wife Divya Vineeth has sung a song in the movie marking her debut in Mollywood as a playback singer.

Tracklist
No.	Title	Lyrics	Singer(s)	Length
1.	"Mele Vinpadavukal"	Manu Manjith	Sooraj Santhosh	2:43
2.	"Varavayi Nee"	Joe Paul	Vineeth Sreenivasan, Divya Vineeth	3:18
3.	"Kadha Parayanu"	Shaan Rahman	Shaan Rahman	1:55
4.	"Nenjame Nenjame"	Joe Paul	Vineeth Sreenivasan, Gowry Lekshmi	4:07
5.	"Penninte"	Manu Manjith	Shaan Rahman	1:59
Total length:				14:03

== Release ==
Sara's began streaming on Amazon Prime Video from 5 July 2021.

== Reception ==
The film opened to mixed to positive reviews from critics. Deepa Soman from The Times of India, gave 3.5 out of 5 stars and saying that the film is "a much-needed mouthpiece for women who don't feel maternal and have no regrets about the same and also for those who don't want to stop chasing their dreams, big or small, regardless of how others judge them about their stand on motherhood." Sowmya Rajendran of The News Minute gave 3.5 out of 5-star rating and reviewed that the film "presents an offbeat, difficult theme in a mainstream fashion that can be watched comfortably by everyone in the drawing room, which can be read as either the film's victory or its undoing". S. R. Praveen of The Hindu wrote the film as a "commendable attempt at course correction on some deeply set societal norms, despite its cliches". Praveen also praised Anna Ben's performance which "goes a long way in propping up the film even in places where it sags due to below-par writing". Baradwaj Rangan of Film Companion South wrote "Sara's looks at a woman's plight from a woman's perspective. It's about Sara's confusions and doubts, the conflict between what she wants to do and what society wants from her."

Manoj Kumar R. of The Indian Express gave 2 out of 5 stars and said that the film "works as an educational film, which could start a conversation in conservative households on subjects that are touted as beyond discussions. But the conservative setting fails to create any dramatic tension in the narration." Haricharan Pudipeddi of Hindustan Times wrote that the film "doesn't try to show motherhood as a burden but it allows one to introspect on the sacrifices women have to make to raise kids". India Today critic Ramya Palisetty called "the film sticks to the concept till the very end - until and unless a woman is ready, she shouldn't be forced into parenthood. Though, it might not convince everyone, the film surely start a conversation" and gave 3.5 out of 5 stars for the film.

Sajin Srijith of The New Indian Express called that the film "appears small on the surface but packs a lot of big topics and thoughts, some of which are relatable and conveyed in a matter of seconds or minutes". Bhavana Sharma of Pinkvilla gave 3 out of 5 and said "Jude Anthony deserves an applause for taking up such a sensitive and important topic and showing it in a beautiful way." A critic from Sify called the film as "a feel-good movie that has its moments and does put forward some questions which could remain in the viewers’ minds" giving 3 out of 5-star rating.

== See also ==
- Sarah's Choice, American TV film with the same theme.
