= Velan (film) =

2021 Indian film

- Theatrical release poster
- Directed by: Kavin Raj
- Written by: Kavin Raj
- Produced by: Kalaimagan Mubarak
- Starring: Mugen Rao; Soori; Meenakshi Govindarajan
- Cinematography: Gopi Jagadeeswaran
- Edited by: K. Sarathkumar
- Music by: Gopi Sundar
- Production company: Skyman Films International
- Release date: 31 December 2021
- Running time: 125 minutes
- Country: India
- Language: Tamil

Velan is a 2021 Indian Tamil-language action drama film written and directed by debutant Kavin and produced by Skyman Films International. The film stars Mugen Rao, Soori and Meenakshi Govindarajan with a supporting cast including Prabhu, Thambi Ramaiah and Hareesh Peradi. The music is composed by Gopi Sundar. The film was released in theatres on 31 December 2021.

== Synopsis ==
The plot revolves around Velan (Mugen Rao), who gets into the bad books of his father Palanisamy (Prabhu), a big shot in his village, due to his privileged behavior. He falls in love with his college friend Ananya (Meenakshi Govindarajan), a Malayali. A mix-up causes her father to fix Velan's match with Vidusha (Maria Vincent), who is also a Malayali girl from her college. When Vidusha's lover Velan and Dineshan (Soori) clear up this confusion without hurting her father, especially when the girl's father Ananda Kuttan (Thambi Ramaiah) and Veluchamy (Hareesh Peradi), who resents the Velan family, plot to embarrass Palanisamy.

== Cast ==
- Mugen Rao as Velan Gounder
- Soori as 'Mamookka' Dineshan
- Meenakshi Govindarajan as Ananya
- Prabhu as 'Thillaiyar' Palanisamy Gounder
- Sriranjani as Amrutham
- Hareesh Peradi as RKV Veluchamy Gounder
- Thambi Ramaiah as Ananda Kuttan
- T. M. Karthik as Madhivanan
- Joe Malloori as Thillaiyar
- Maria Vincent as Vidhusha
- Prankster Rahul as Sathish
- Brigida Saga as Pavithra
- Billy Murali as Kaliyamoorthy
- Swaminathan as Priest

== Soundtrack ==
The soundtrack and score is composed by Gopi Sundar, and the album featured four songs. The audio rights were acquired by Think Music. The song "Sathiyama Sollurandi" is based on Mugen Rao's single of the same name.

Track listing
No.	Title	Lyrics	Singer(s)	Length
1.	"Dandanakka Dandanakka Thavuladi"	Velmurugan, Kalaimagan Mubarak	Velmurugan	04:46
2.	"Sathiyama Sollurandi"	Mugen Rao	Mugen Rao, Sivaangi Krishnakumar	03:41
3.	"Ennai Aalum Pennilave"	Uma Devi	Pradeep Kumar, Priyanka NK	03:50
4.	"Kaanal Neer Aanathe"	Lalithanand	Mugen Rao	02:56

== Release ==
=== Theatrical ===
The film was released in theatres on 31 December 2021 and opened to moderate reviews from critics.

=== Home media ===
The post-theatrical streaming rights of the film was bought by ZEE5 and the satellite rights of the film was bought by Zee Tamil and Zee Thirai.

== Reception ==
Suganth of The Times of India rated the film with 2.5/5 stars, stating that "Velan exists somewhere in between these two experiences. It is not a film one can whole-heartedly recommend, but at the same time, it is not exactly bad." Sify gave a rating of 3 out on 5 and wrote, "Velan is not a groundbreaking attempt in Tamil cinema but it's not a film that is difficult to sit through. It's a typical rural entertainer with a predictable screenplay but the comedy and emotions work!" Bhuvanesh Chandar of Cinema Express wrote, "In commercial family entertainers like Velan, at least one of the many elements cooked together should work to pull in the audience. Sadly, except for the interval block, none of the scenes works in its favour. To all poorly cooked commercial entertainers, Velan screams "Sema Killi!""
