= Jinn – The Pet =

Indian Tamil-language fantasy film by TR Bala

- Theatrical release poster
- Directed by: T.R. Bala
- Written by: T.R. Bala
- Produced by: T.R. Bala
- Starring: Mugen Rao; Bhavya Trikha
- Cinematography: Arjun Raja
- Edited by: Deepak
- Music by: Vivek-Mervin
- Production company: Fairy Tale Pictures
- Release date: 30 May 2025
- Country: India
- Language: Tamil

Jinn – The Pet is a 2025 Indian Tamil-language fantasy film written, directed, and produced by T.R. Bala in his directoral debut under the Fairy Tale Pictures banner. The film stars Mugen Rao and Bhavya Trikha in the lead roles.

Jinn – The Pet was released in theatres on 30 May 2025.

== Plot ==
Two young women enter a mosque. One of the women is possessed by a violent ghost. The priests separate the ghost from the woman and captures the Ghost in a box. Sakthi temporarily works in a music band in Malaysia. Sakthi wins a lottery while exploring an antique shop. Antique shop keeper explains about Jinn and Sakthi buys a ghost box containing a Jinn. After the expiry of the Malaysian contract for the music band, Sakthi reaches Chennai to be with his family. Sakthi explains about the Jinn to his family but Sakthi's family is afraid of the Jinn. Sakthi's grandmother is injured and taken to a hospital. Sakthi meets a nurse named Priya at the hospital whom he first met at the airport and falls in love with her. Sakthi gets loan from a loan shark to start his own music band. Sakthi and Priya express their mutual love and are married. Mysterious things happen in the house and the family members are disturbed by a ghostly figure. Sakthi takes the Jinn to another priest to make the Jinn to stop disturbing his family. While returning from the priest, Loan Shark's thugs beat up Sakthi for Non-Payment of loan. Jinn helps Sakthi to fight off the Loan Shark's thugs. Sakthi's Sister gives birth to a baby boy. Priya is seriously injured and believing that Jinn is responsible for Priya's condition, Sakthi throws the Jinn box out of the house. Jinn box's lock breaks and Jinn comes out in full physical body. Priya is admitted in the hospital in a coma state. A thug dressed as a doctor tries to kill Priya. Jinn possess Sakthi to save Priya and beats up the thug. Jinn reveals an ancient story of Sakthi and Priya being the reincarnation of an Indonesian King and Queen. The same Jinn (Good Jinn) was protecting the King and Queen. One of the King's minister kills the King and Queen with the help of a Bad Jinn (ghost from the opening scene) and locks away the Good Jinn. Priya is discharged from the hospital and kept at Sakthi's house still under coma state. Several thugs arrive at Sakthi's house to kill Priya. Jinn helps Sakthi to fight off the thugs and Sakthi finds a clue about the people trying to kill Priya. Priya is revealed to be the long lost daughter of a billionaire, Radha Krishnan. Radha Krishnan's manager and his son Ashok are trying to kill Priya to inherit Radha Krishnan's wealth. Priya comes out of coma and shares the evidence relating to Radha Krishnan's death to Radha Krishnan's lawyer and the lawyer discloses the evidence to media. Priya is kidnapped. The manager visits a Priest (opening scene Priest) and gets the Bad Jinn Box. Good Jinn possess Sakthi and tries to rescue Priya but the manager captures the Jinn with the help of a Priest. Good Jinn escapes capture and the manager releases the Bad Jinn. Good Jinn fights and destroys the Bad Jinn.

== Cast ==
- Mugen Rao as Sakthi
- Bhavya Trikha as Priya
- Bala Saravanan
- Imman Annachi
- Radha Ravi
- Vadivukkarasi
- Nizhalgal Ravi
- Vinodhini Vaidyanathan
- George Vijay
- Master Shakti

== Production ==
On 18 January 2023, it was announced that T.R. Bala who had earlier directed Mugen Rao for the musical video "Othai Thamarai" is set to write, direct and produce the film titled Jinn featuring the latter in the lead role. The film was launched on the same day after a formal pooja ceremony, having Joe (2023) fame Bhavya Trikha as the female lead. The film also features Bala Saravanan, Imman Annachi, Radha Ravi, Vadivukkarasi, Nizhalgal Ravi, Vinodhini Vaidyanathan, George Vijay, Rithvik and others in supporting roles.

The first look poster of the fantasy film was released on 24 October 2023, revealing the title to be Jinn - The Pet. The film is produced by T.R. Bala under the Fairy Tale Pictures banner. The technical team consists of cinematographer Arjun Raja, editor Deepak, music composer duo Vivek–Mervin, stunt choreographer Pradeep Dinesh and costume designer Deepthi Deifilia.

== Music ==
Jinn - The Pet

Soundtrack album by Vivek–Mervin
- Genre: Feature film soundtrack
- Language: Tamil
- Label: Saregama
- Producer: Vivek–Mervin

Vivek–Mervin chronology
Hitler (2024)	Jinn - The Pet (2025)	Gandhi Kannadi (2025)

Singles from Jinn - The Pet
- 1. "Kuttyma" Released: 30 November 2023; 2. "Konjam Pakkam Vaa" Released: 5 March 2024; 3. "Bore Aana Vaazhka" Released: 26 July 2024; 4. "LaLaLa" Released: 24 September 2024

The music is composed by the duo Vivek–Mervin. The first single "Kuttyma" released on 30 November 2023. The second single "Konjam Pakkam Vaa" released on 5 March 2024. The third single "Bore Aana Vaazhka" released on 26 July 2024. The fourth single "LaLaLa" released on 24 September 2024.

Track listing
No.	Title	Lyrics	Singer(s)	Length
1.	"Kuttyma"	Ku Karthik	Mervin Solomon
2.	"Konjam Pakkam Vaa"	Vishnu Edavan	Sam Vishal, Sanjana Kalmanje
3.	"Bore Aana Vaazhka"	Vishnu Edavan	Mugen Rao
4.	"LaLaLa"	Viveka	Vishnupriya Ravi

== Release ==
=== Theatrical ===
Jinn – The Pet was released in theatres on 30 May 2025.

=== Home media ===
Jinn – The Pet began streaming on Sun NXT and Amazon Prime from 20 June 2025.

== Reception ==
=== Critical response ===
Jinn – The Pet received mixed to negative reviews from critics.

Dinamalar rated the film 2.5 out of 5 stars, noting that while the film attempted a blend of comedy, horror, and fantasy, it lacked a gripping screenplay, causing the narrative to falter, especially in the second half. Maalai Malar also awarded the film 2.5 out of 5 stars, highlighting the film's attempt at a fantasy thriller but criticizing its inconsistent tone and screenplay. Abhinav Subramanian of The Times of India gave the film 2 out of 5 stars, writing, "Jinn wears its supernatural ambitions like an oversized coat, stumbling through territory that demands more finesse than it can muster. [...] The Jinn, when finally materialized, becomes a garrulous sidekick prone to questionable one-liners rather than the mystical entity the premise deserves."

Akshay Kumar of Cinema Express rated the film 1.5 out of 5 stars, stating, "Jinn – The Pet somewhat finds its feet and becomes coherent in the last act. [...] The film, in a nutshell, is in constant tonal confusion and settles for something predictable towards the end with convenient writing doing a disservice to even the relatively better parts." Rakesh Thara of ABP News praised the romantic scenes between Mugen Rao and Bhavya Trikha but criticized the screenplay for lacking coherence and depth.
