= The Madras Song =

2014 Indian song

Single by Shakthisree Gopalan
- Released: 18 August 2014
- Recorded: 2014
- Length: 4:18
- Composer: Vijay Prabakaran
- Lyricist: Subu
- Producer: Murugappa Group

"The Madras Song" is a song by Indian vocalist, Shakthisree Gopalan, and produced by the Murugappa Group as a tribute to the city of Madras (now known as Chennai). "The Madras Song" was launched to commemorate the 375th anniversary of the founding of Madras, celebrated in August 2014.

A sequel to this song by Opus G7 for The Hindu group called “Madras Beats” was launched in 2016 on the evening of the 377th anniversary celebrations of Madras Day.

== Storyline ==
The official video of the song follows a female protagonist, Ruchi Kumar, who misses her flight home and finds herself stranded in Madras. With three days at her disposal, she uses social media for guidance in exploring the city.

The video features actor/model Yasmin Ponnappa as Ruchi Kumar. The video also features appearances by Viswanathan Anand, Gautham Vasudev Menon, Sudha Raghunathan, Naresh Iyer, Aalap Raju, Haricharan, Priyadarsini Govind, RJ Balaji, “Crazy" Mohan and "Maadhu" Balaji.

== Team ==
- Writer / director: Vijay Prabakaran
- Music director: Vishal Chandrashekhar
- Lyricist: Subu
- Singer: Shakthisree Gopalan
- Cinematographers: GVS Raju & Imran Ahmedh KR
- Lead actress: Yasmin Ponnappa
- Executive producer: Krishna Ramkumar
- Associate director: Swathi Raghuraaman
- Assistant directors: Meera.Karthik, Keerthi Raju
- Production assistant: RM Ramesh kumar
- Camera assistant: Baskar
- Stylist: Yasmin Ponnappa
- Post-production: Red Studio
- Editor: Vijay Prabakaran
- Colorist: Madan
- Logo design: Hakuhodo Percept, Chennai
- Produced by the Murugappa Group
- Radio partner: 92.7 BigFM
