= Kathir (film) =

2022 Indian film

- Theatrical release poster
- Directed by: Dhinesh Palanivel
- Written by: Dhinesh Palanivel
- Starring: Venkatesh; Santhosh Prathap; Bhavya Trikha; Rajini Chandy
- Cinematography: Jayanth Sethu Mathavan
- Edited by: Deepak S. Dwaraknath
- Music by: Prashant Pillai
- Production company: Dhuvaraga Studios
- Release date: 29 April 2022
- Country: India
- Language: Tamil

Kathir (transl. Ray) is a 2022 Indian Tamil-language drama film written and directed by Dhinesh Palanivel and produced by Dhuvaraga Studios. The film stars Venkatesh, Santhosh Prathap, Bhavya Trikha and Rajini Chandy. The film's music is composed by Prashant Pillai, with cinematography handled by Jayanth Sethu Mathavan and editing done by Deepak S. Dwaraknath. The film released in theatres on 29 April 2022.

== Plot ==
Kathir revolves around two people – an unemployed engineering graduate and an old woman with an inspiring past. How their lives get influenced by each other forms the crux of the film.

== Cast ==
- Venkatesh as Kathir
- Santhosh Prathap as Savithri's late husband
- Bhavya Trikha as Deepshika
- Rajini Chandy as Savithri
- Arya Ramesh as young Savithri

== Soundtrack ==
The soundtrack and score is composed by Prashant Pillai and the album featured three songs. The audio rights were acquired by Think Music.

Track listing
No.	Title	Lyrics	Singer(s)	Length
1.	"Pa Pa Pa"	Karthik Netha	Pushpavanam Kuppusamy	4:55
2.	"Naandhaana Naan Needhaana"	Uma Devi	Gowtham Bharadwaj, Keerthana Vaidyanathan	5:01
3.	"Nigazhe Sadhaa"	Karthik Netha	Sreekanth Hariharan, Preeti Pillai	4:11
4.	"Naan Pookalaalae Unnai"	Uma Devi	Preeti Pillai	2:31
5.	"Nada Podu Nanba"	Dhinesh Palanivel	Gowtham Bharadwaj, Sreerag Saji	2:42
6.	"Uzhudha Puzhuthila"	Muruga Boopathy	Dinesh M	1:44
7.	"Keetraadum Vaaanam"	Karthik Netha	Sreekanth Hariharan	4:07
Total length:				25:12

== Reception ==
Logesh Balachandran of The Times of India rated the film with 3/5 stars, stating that, "Kathir is a good watch for people who expect to take something memorable from a film." Bhuvanesh Chandar of Cinema Express gave the rating 2 out of 5 stars and said "It's sad to see how small films like this miss out on becoming something great even when there is potential. I mean, it could have revived itself at many junctures. Hopefully, someone gets to make a better film about the Kathirs and paatis of our world, for there is a good film hiding somewhere there." Ananda Vikatan rated the film 41 out of 100, praising the director for taking a conventional story and perfecting it with lively incidents, interesting screenplay and natural actors.

Dinamani critic said that " 'Kathir' has become an incredible film for many of the film crew including director Dinesh Palanivel and hero Venkatesh as this is their first film. Can watch. "
