= Bhavya Trikha =

Indian actress (born 1998)

- Born: 30 September 1998 (age 27); Chennai, Tamil Nadu, India
- Education: Chennai Nungambakkam M.O.P. Vaishnava College.
- Occupation: Actor
- Years active: 2022–present

Bhavya Trikha (born 30 September 1998) is an Indian actress, who has appeared in Tamil language films. Bhavya is well known for her role in the movie Joe.

== Personal life ==
Bhavya Trikha was born in Chennai. She completed her schooling at Chennai Nungambakkam M.O.P. and she completed media studies at Vaishnava College.

== Career ==
Bhavya made her debut in the film Kathir in 2022, followed by Joe (2023) directed by Hariharan Ram S, which received positive reviews from critics. In 2024, she played the lead role in the film Idi Minnal Kadhal, which was released on 29 March 2024.

== Filmography ==
Year	Film	Role	Ref.
2022	Kathir	Deepshika	
2023	Joe	Shruthi	
2024	Idi Minnal Kadhal	Janani	
2025	Jinn – The Pet	Priya	
2025	Bun Butter Jam	Nandhini	
2026	ROOT - Running Out Of Time †	TBA	
TBA	Singanallur Signal †	TBA	
