= Pathinettam Padi =

2019 film directed by Shanker Ramakrishnan

- Theatrical release poster
- Directed by: Shanker Ramakrishnan
- Written by: Shanker Ramakrishnan
- Produced by: Shaji Nadesan
- Starring: Akshay Radhakrishnan; Ashwin Gopinath; Nakul Thampi; Ambi Neenasam; Sumesh Moor; Sandeep Pradeep; Fahim Safar; Chandhunadh; Aarsha Chandini Baiju; Wafa Khadeeja Rahman
- Cinematography: Sudeep Elamon
- Edited by: Bhuvan Srinivasan
- Music by: A. H. Kaashif
- Production company: August Cinema
- Distributed by: August Cinema
- Release date: 5 July 2019
- Country: India
- Language: Malayalam

Pathinettam Padi (transl. Eighteenth Step) is a 2019 Indian Malayalam-language coming of age action drama film, written and directed by Shankar Ramakrishnan and produced by Shaji Nadesan under the banner of August Cinema.The film stars Akshay Radhakrishnan, Ashwin Gopinath, Nakul Thampi, Chandunadh, Sandeep Pradeep, Ahaana Krishna, Wafa Khatheeja Rahman and Aarsha Chandini Baiju in the lead roles and Mammootty, Arya, Prithviraj Sukumaran and Unni Mukundan in extended cameo roles.

The film was released in theaters on 5 July 2019.

== Plot ==
Students of two schools in Trivandrum, Kerala, India that cater to different economic classes are in a tussle. While one set struggles for survival, the other is busy finding joy in drugs. The two groups keep finding reasons to mess with each other. It revolves around the two rebel leaders of the groups and their epic tale of romance, rivalry and friendship. Prof. John Abraham (Mammooty) guides these youngsters as they step from adolescence to adulthood.

== Cast ==
- Ambi Neenasam as Attukal Suran
- Aarsha Chandini Baiju as Devi
- Aswathlal as Sakhavu Abhayan
- Moor as Ambotty
- Sandeep Pradeep as Puthran
- Vijeesh as Kombi
- Sandeep as Don
- Yadav Shashidhar
- Sangeeth as Duke
- Chandunath G Nair as Joy Abraham Palakkal, John's younger brother
- Abhinand Girish as Abhi
- Wafa Khadeeja Rahman as Angel
- Adam as Screw George
- Ashish Pillai as Godfrey
- Harisankar S G as Tittumon
- Ankit Harikrishnan as Kiran D
- Fahim Safar as Ibru / Kunjikka
- Jitin Puthanchery as Giri
- Vishnu Vijayakumar as Priest
- Suraj Venjaramoodu as Minister Kaniyapuram Narendran
- Ahaana Krishna as Annie
- Saniya Iyappan as Saniya
- Biju Sopanam as Shalamon Palakkal
- Mukundan as V Joseph
- Parvathi T. as Susan Palakkal
- Manoj K Jayan as Stanlin Moore
- Lalu Alex as Nandhan Menon
- Nandu as H. C. Vijayan, Ayyappan's father
- Muthumani as Ayyappan's mother, Teacher
- Maniyanpilla Raju as Sudheer Kumar(Invigilator)
- Shaji Nadeshan as School Manager
- Harini as Anna Jones
- Vivek Premachandran as Monty
- George Pulikkan as Fr Pulikkan
- Gautham Padmanabhan as Aby Mullassery
- Anagha Ashok as Divya
- Krishnendhu as Ayyappan's s sister
- Hrishikesh Namboothiri as Khanna
- Chandrakumar Sadanandhan as Ambili Annan
- Sharath Jayaprakash as Magician Patteri
- Rohit Kumar Regmi as Neppali
- Sharran Puthumana as Annie's brother
- Krishnan Balakrishnan as Achuthan, Aji's father
- Dhanya Varma as Dhanu (Journalist)
- Mithun Abraham as Captain Santhosh Kumar
- Parvathy Prann as Paru
- Mammootty as John Abraham Palakkal (extended cameo appearance)
- Arya as Major Ayyappan, a Military officer (extended cameo Appearance)
  - Akshay Radhakrishnan as Young Ayyappan
- Prithviraj Sukumaran as Ashwin Vasudev (extended cameo Appearance)
  - Ashwin Gopinath as Young Ashwin Vasudev
- Nakul Thampi as Sony, Ayyappan's rival, The main antagonist
- Unni Mukundan as District Collector Ajith Nair IAS (Guest Appearance)
  - Sreechand Suresh as Young Ajith Nair/Aji
- Priyamani as Gouri Vasudev, Ashwin's sister (Extended Cameo Appearance)
- Rajeev Pillai as Monty's brother/Drug Lord (Cameo Appearance)
- Fayiz Muhammed as Violinist (Cameo Appearance)

== Production ==
Shooting began in January 2019 and movie was released in India on 5 July 2019.

== Reception ==
Manoj Kumar R. of The Indian Express gave 3.5 out of 5 and wrote - The film is crammed with characters and subplots that leave you overwhelmed. Is this the story about Ashwin Vasudev who overcame his flaws to build a school that challenges the conventional idea of education? Or is it the story of Ayyappan, who remembers his first love after taking a bullet near his chest in a gun battle at the border? Or it must be about students who abuse drugs? No wait, it is about Mammootty's John Abraham Palakkal taking on the flawed educational system? Actually, it's about everything and everyone. It is just too much. The background score of the film is also so confusing as it is hard to tell the heroes from the villains. Even the bad guys get to deliver lengthy punchlines, walk in slow motion, and strike action poses.

S. R. Praveen of The Hindu called the movie an unrealistic depiction of student rivalry in schools and wrote - At the core of the film is the long-standing rivalry between student gangs belonging to two schools in Trivandrum city. It is the kind of rivalry which seems quite unreal for school students, even in a masala entertainer, mainly due to the level of violence involved. Notwithstanding the fact that some of these stylized stunts are aesthetically shot or well-choreographed, these scenes don't belong in a movie about school students. Similarly, the five-star hangouts of the international school students, complete with an 'item song' also looks far removed from reality. The characters of the girls are relegated to the background, with hardly any of them getting a line or two to utter. Too many characters make their appearance, but only a couple of them are written with any depth to them. The whole bunch of newcomers do show promise, lighting up the screen with their infectious energy, even as the script, written by director Shanker Ramakrishnan himself, sags.
