= Mugen Rao =

Indian singer (born 1995)

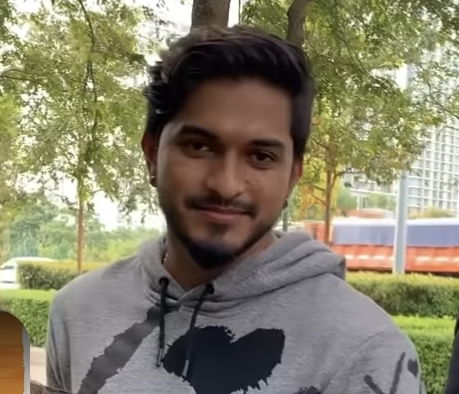
- Rao in 2020

Background information
- Born: Mugen Rao; 20 October 1995 (age 30); Kuala Lumpur, Malaysia
- Occupations: Actor, singer
- Years active: 2009–present
- Website: www.mugenrao.com

Mugen Rao (born on 20 October 1995) is a Malaysian singer and actor who predominantly appears in Tamil films. In 2019, he participated in the reality show Bigg Boss 3 and later emerged as the winner. He is also known for playing lead roles in films such as Ghora (2018) and Velan (2021).

== Personal life ==
Mugen was born in Kuala Lumpur, Malaysia, one of three children. His father, Prakash Rao, died in 2020.

In 2019, Rao confirmed his relationship with Malaysian actress Yasmin Nadiah.

== Career ==
He began his singing career with his father, a stage singer, and performed in fifty stage shows. He made his acting debut in the Malay TV show Senandung Malam, then had small parts in films including Gerak Khas and Ghora, in shorts, TV films, and advertising.

Rao's career took off in 2016, when his music video "Kayalvizhi" went viral on YouTube. His later music videos include "Anbe Aruyire", "Pogiren", "Mayakkurriye", and "Oththa Thamarai", which was shot in 2022 using virtual production technology.

In 2019, he was the first Malaysian contestant on Bigg Boss Tamil edition, and emerged as the winner. While on Bigg Boss Tamil season 3, he sang the unreleased song "Sathiyama", which was only officially released in 2020. He then moved to Chennai and sought to break into Tamil cinema.

He signed a three-film deal in 2020, and was announced at the time to have a leading role in Vettri. He played the lead in Velan, directed by Kavin Moorthy and released in December 2021. In 2022, he began filming Mathil Mel Kadhal alongside Divya Bharathi.

He later played the lead role in the film Jinn - The Pet (2025) which was directed by TR Bala alongside actress Bhavaya Trikha.

== Filmography ==
=== Films ===
Year	Film	Role(s)	Notes
2018	Ghora	Adhitya	Malaysian film
2018	Haran	Abdu	Malaysian film
2018	Hey Coffeelopher	Ram	Malaysian film
2019	Venpa	Yuvaraj Balakrishnan "YB"	Malaysian film (special appearance)
2021	Velan	Velan	Also singer and lyricist
2025	Jinn - The Pet	Thomas	
TBA	Madhil Mel Kaadhal	TBA	

=== Web series ===
List of web series and roles
Year	Title	Role	Notes	Ref.
2023	MY3	Adhitya Chandrasekhar	OTT Release	

=== Short films ===
Year	Title	Notes
2017	I am Peter	
2018	Light Up Someone's Life	

=== Television ===
==== Actor ====
Year	Serial/Telemovie/Drama	Role	Channel	Language	Notes
2009	Senandung Malam	Paperboy		Malay	
2010	Da Bomba			Malay	Supporting
2011	Gerak Khas		TV2	Malay	Supporting
2012	Sindiket Fixie			Malay	Supporting
2012	Rumah Kecil Itu			Malay	Supporting
2014	Rembau Ada WiFi			Malay	Supporting
2016	ASTRO Sitcom: Barber			Tamil	Main Cast
2016	Veetuku Oru Paati			Tamil	Main Cast
2016	Ippadiyum Pannalama			Tamil	Main Cast
2017	Agam Puram			Tamil	
2018	Sekuriti		TV2	Tamil	
2018	Sugamaana Sumaigal			Tamil	
2019	Nee Yaar		TV2	Tamil	Main Cast Best TV Drama Actor award

==== Reality shows (non fiction) ====
Year	Reality Show/Fiction/Live Show	Role	Channel	Notes
2016	360 Degrees: Season 11	Anchor	Astro Vaanavil	
2017	360 Degrees: Season 12	Anchor	Astro Vaanavil	
2017	Chinna Kabali	Anchor	Astro Vaanavil	
2017	Astro Ponggal	Anchor	Astro Vaanavil	
2018	Astro Ponggal	Anchor	Astro Vaanavil	
2019	KL to KK: Let's roll	Host	Astro Ulagam	
2019	Bigg Boss 3	Contestant	Vijay TV	Winner
2019	Super Singer 7	Guest	Vijay TV	
2019	The Wall	Guest	Vijay TV	
2020	Dancing Super Stars	Judge	Vijay TV	

=== Music videos ===
Actor

Year	Song	Music	Notes
2014	"Anbe Aaruyirae"	Prashan Sean	
2015	"Aayiram Sorkal"	Emzzie Boi	Also co-lyricist
2016	"Kadhal Enbathu Saabama"	Lawrence Soosai	
2016	"Nanba Vaa"	Jose Franklin	
2022	"Mayakirriye"	AniVee	
2022	"Othai Thamarai"	Sandy Sandellow	
2023	"Single Aayiten Di"	Dharan Kumar	
2023	"Makka Makka"	Harris Jayaraj	

== Discography ==
=== Singer ===
- Note: When he is credited as the composer, he is credited as Mugen Rao MGR.

Year	Song	Composer(s)	Co-singer(s)	Writer(s)	Ref.
2014	"Kaadhaley Kannir"	Coruz Hooks	A'sha, Coruz Hooks	Mugen Rao	
2015	"Ring-Eh"	Razor Ray	A Sha	Mugen Rao	
2016	"Kayalvizhi"	Coruz Hooks	Solo	Mugen Rao	
2018	"Pogiren"	Prashan Sean	Prashan Sean	Mugen Rao	
2018	"Abinaya"	Shane Extreme, Mugen Rao	Solo	Mugen Rao	
2018	"Kannu Rapulo" (Telugu)			Mugen Rao	
2018	"Zombie Kadhal"			Mugen Rao	
2019	"Yenggedi"	Shane Extreme	Solo	Mugen Rao	
2019	"Maya"	Mugen Rao	Solo	Mugen Rao	
2019	"Sathiyama"	Mugen Rao, Shane Extreme	Priyashankari	Mugen Rao	
2020	"Arivum Anbum"	Ghibran	Kamal Haasan, Ghibran, Anirudh Ravichander, Yuvan Shankar Raja, Shankar Mahadevan, Bombay Jayashri, Sid Sriram, Devi Sri Prasad, Shruti Haasan, Andrea Jeremiah, Siddharth	Kamal Haasan	
2020	"Thedinen"	Mugen Rao, Shane Extreme	Solo	Mugen Rao	
2021	"Sathiyama Sollurandi"	Gopi Sundar, Mugen Rao	Sivaangi Krishnakumar	Mugen Rao	
2021	"Kaanal Neer Aanathe"	Gopi Sundar	Solo	Lalithanand	
2022	"Mudhal Kaathal"	Mugen Rao, Vivasvan	Solo	Mugen Rao, Vivasvan	
2023	"Murugan Cassette Vol.1"	Mugen Rao	Havoc Brothers	Mugen Rao	

Preceded by Riythvika	Bigg Boss Tamil Winner (Series 3) 2019	Succeeded by Aari Arujunan
