= Kalki (2017 film) =

2017 film by Dhilip Kumar

- Film poster
- Directed by: Dhilip Kumar
- Written by: Baradwaj Rangan
- Produced by: Prateek Chakravorty; Shruti Nallappa
- Starring: Kishore; Yasmin Ponnappa
- Cinematography: Vijay Kartik Kannan
- Edited by: A. Sreekar Prasad
- Music by: Girishh G.
- Production company: Pramod Films
- Distributed by: Netflix
- Release date: 31 May 2017
- Running time: 40 minutes
- Country: India
- Language: Tamil

Kalki is a 2017 Indian Tamil-language short film, directed by Dhilip Kumar and written by film critic Baradwaj Rangan. Produced by Prateek Chakravorty and Shruti Nallappa under the banner Pramod Films, the film stars Kishore and Yasmin Ponnappa in the lead roles. The film has music composed by Girishh G., with cinematography handled by Vijay Kartik Kannan, and edited by A. Sreekar Prasad. The film released on 31 May 2017.

== Premise ==
A woman named Kalki (Yasmin Ponnappa) is introduced in the beginning of the film leaving the audience wondering who she is. A scientist, Kishore (Kishore), is on a journey to solve one of the greatest mysteries of the universe. While doing so, he falls in love with Radhika (Yasmin Ponnappa). However, Radhika has a secret that Kishore doesn't know about.

== Cast ==
- Kishore as Kishore
- Yasmin Ponnappa as Kalki and Radhika (dual roles)
- Mithrabhoomi Saravanan

== Release ==
The film released digitally through Netflix on 31 May 2017.

== Reception ==
S. Srivatsan of India Today gave the film three out of five stars and called the film as an "engaging watch for its plot and characters", further praising Yasmin Ponnappa's performance in particular. On the other hand, Anupam Kant Verma of Firstpost gave the film a rating of two-and-a-half out of five and stated that "the film meanders through its long runtime, dancing around the themes it should have explored in order to service a mystery that leaves a lot to be desired".
