= 2018 (film) =

2023 Indian film by Jude Anthany Joseph

2018 : Everyone is a hero
- Theatrical release poster
- Directed by: Jude Anthany Joseph
- Written by: Jude Anthany Joseph; Akhil P. Dharmajan
- Produced by: Venu Kunnappilly; C. K. Padma Kumar; Anto Joseph
- Starring: Tovino Thomas; Kunchacko Boban; Asif Ali; Narain; Vineeth Sreenivasan; Lal
- Cinematography: Akhil George
- Edited by: Chaman Chakko
- Music by: Songs: Nobin Paul; William Francis; Background Score: Nobin Paul; Dawn Vincent
- Production companies: Kavya Film Company; PK Prime Production
- Distributed by: Kavya Film Company
- Release date: 5 May 2023
- Running time: 148 minutes
- Country: India
- Language: Malayalam
- Budget: est.₹26 crore
- Box office: est.₹180 crore

2018 (subtitled onscreen as Everyone is a Hero) is a 2023 Indian Malayalam-language disaster film based on the 2018 Kerala floods. Directed by Jude Anthany Joseph, who co-wrote the screenplay with Akhil P. Dharmajan, the film is produced by Venu Kunnappilly, C.K. Padmakumar, and Anto Joseph under the banners of Kavya Film Company and PK Prime Production. The film stars an ensemble cast consisting of Tovino Thomas, Kunchacko Boban, Asif Ali, Narain, Vineeth Sreenivasan, Tanvi Ram, Aparna Balamurali, and Lal.

The film was announced in September 2018 by Jude Anthany Joseph, under the tentative title of 2403 Ft.: The Story Of Unexpected Heroes, before being titled 2018. Principal photography commenced in October 2019 and took place across different parts of Kerala, such as Thrissur, Ernakulam, Alappuzha, Kottayam, Idukki, and Kollam as well as in Tirunelveli in Tamil Nadu. Although production had been delayed due to the COVID-19 pandemic, it resumed in May 2022 and concluded on 13 November 2022. The music was composed by Nobin Paul and Francis Williams, whilst the cinematography and editing were handled by Chaman Chakko and Akhil George, respectively.

Initially scheduled to release on 21 April 2023, 2018 was released on 5 May 2023. The film received generally positive reviews and emerged as a commercial success, grossing ₹177 crore (equivalent to ₹193 crore or US$20 million in 2026) becoming the highest-grossing Malayalam film of all time exceeding Pulimurugan (2016) until Manjummel Boys (2024) took over. The film was chosen by the Film Federation of India as India's official entry for Best International Feature Film at the 96th Academy Awards. It was chosen as it addresses a global issue and depicts the harrowing realities of what a natural calamity is for common people. It became the fourth Malayalam film after Guru (1997), Adaminte Makan Abu (2011) and Jallikattu (2019) to be selected as India's official submission for the Academy Awards, although it failed to make the cut. It was featured in the 54th IFFI Indian panorama mainstream section.

== Plot ==
In 2018, in a small village called Aruvikulam, Anoop, a former military officer haunted by the trauma of witnessing soldiers' deaths, works at a store owned by the visually impaired Bhasi. Anoop's affections are directed towards Manju, a teacher at the local government school, and the two contemplate marriage. Seeking a Dubai visa, Anoop enlists the help of his friend Rameshan, who grapples with a hidden marital crisis. Sethupathi, a truck driver from a drought-stricken Tamil Nadu village, crosses paths with Noora, a TV reporter covering the water scarcity crisis. This encounter triggers a fateful incident, leading Noora to Kerala, where her family faces health challenges.

Tensions escalate among protestors dissatisfied with media coverage, culminating in a violent plan involving explosives. Sethupathi is tasked with transporting the explosives to Kerala. Meanwhile, Shaji, a government officer overseeing disaster management, grapples with missing fishermen after a severe storm.

Mathachan, a fisherman, and his family rescue lost fishermen while navigating internal conflicts. Nixon, Mathachan's son, defies family tradition by pursuing a modelling career, complicating his relationship with Jiji, Chandy's daughter. Nixon returns to help his family during floods, overcoming differences with his father. Rameshan's family troubles intensify, prompting his return to Kerala, while Anoop's wedding plans face disruption due to heavy rainfall.

The floods wreak havoc, and Shaji, Anoop, and Sethupathi involve themselves highly in rescue efforts. A tragedy strikes when Mathachan loses his life during a rescue operation. Sethupathi undergoes a transformation, abandoning his initial intentions to contribute to relief efforts by delivering groceries. Koshy, a taxi driver, and a Polish couple seek refuge in Anoop's house during the floods.

Anoop's heroism extends to aiding Air Force officers, saving a pregnant woman, and attempting to rescue a distressed family. He even saves the blind shopkeeper, Bhasi. Unfortunately, Anoop loses his life while saving others, leaving a legacy of selflessness. As floodwaters recede, the community honours Anoop's sacrifices with a monument.

== Cast ==
- Tovino Thomas as Anoop, a former soldier in Indian Army
- Kunchacko Boban as Shaji Punnoose
- Asif Ali as Nixon, Mathachan's younger son
- Narain as Winston, Mathachan's elder son
- Vineeth Sreenivasan as Rameshan, an IT specialist
- Tanvi Ram as Manju, Anoop's love interest
- Lal as Mathachan, a fisherman
- Aparna Balamurali as Noora, a news reporter
- Nileen Sandra as Teena, Winston's wife
- Kalaiyarasan as Sethupathy, a lorry driver from Madurai
- Aju Varghese as Jacob Koshy, a taxi driver
- Sudheesh as Varghese
- Harikrishnan as Alex, Anoop's friend
- Anamika Raj as Alina, Nixon's love interest
- Indrans as Bhasi
- Siddique as Salim, Noora's father
- Renji Panicker as Ramachandran, Anu's father
- Sshivada as Serina, Shaji's wife
- Gauthami Nair as Anupama, Rameshan's wife
- Janardhanan as Chief Minister Balachandran Kurup
- G. Suresh Kumar as Govindan, Anoop's father
- Jaffar Idukki as Aravindan, Manju's father
- Vinitha Koshy as Pregnant lady
- Vriddhi Vishal as Pregnant lady's daughter
- Gilu Joseph as Jiji
- Jayashree Sivadhas as Meera
- Joy Mathew as Chandy, Alina's father
- Ramesh Thilak as Ashok, Rameshan's friend
- Jayakrishnan as District Collector Ananthakrishnan IAS
- Krishna as IAS Officer
- Jayakumar Parameswaran Pillai as Ravikumar
- Rony David Raj as Cleetus
- S. P. Sreekumar as Joseph
- Pauly Valsan as Constable Mary Thomas
- Shebin Benson as Nahas, Noora's brother
- Shobha Mohan as Nandini, Rameshan's mother
- Sreeja Ravi as Lakshmi, Anoop's mother
- Kalabhavan Haneef as Dam Operator
- Boban Samuel as Police Officer
- Santhakumari as Villager
- K.R Nayar as P. K Nayar, DGP of Police

== Production ==
=== Development ===
The film was officially announced in September 2018 tentatively titled 2403 Ft.: The Story Of Unexpected Heroes, later being changed to 2018. Jude Anthony Joseph intended to make a film about the 2018 Kerala floods in 2018 with a major part of the film revolving around the rescue operations undertaken by the fishermen community. Jude Anthony Joseph planned to write the screenplay along with John Manthrickal, the co-writer of Annmariya Kalippilaanu. Shaan Rahman was supposed to compose the music for the film, with cinematography and editing handled by Jomon T. John and Mahesh Narayanan, respectively. Joseph confirmed that the film would require extensive visual effects and CGI and was in talks with a Hollywood-based VFX company. The cast had not been confirmed, however Joseph confirmed that filming would begin in 2019. Once the film had been revived, the technicians and actors who were part of the initial cast were not retained during pre-production and were replaced with different actors and technicians.

Jude Anthony Joseph had conceived the film when he was approached by an NGO to document the heroic acts of thousands of people throughout the flood. As a part of his extensive research, he met with fisherman from Kollam who went for rescue missions in Chengannur during that time. He also had spoken with the police officers, volunteers, army personnel and fire force workers who had assisted in those rescue operations. He started working with novelist Akhil P. Dharmajan on the screenplay initially completing the draft in June 2019 and began shooting at a school in Kalady in October 2019. A span of three years was taken to complete the film that featured 125 characters and several subplots. According to Jude, the plan was to shoot Tovino Thomas’ portions in 12 days and resume shooting in March 2020. They began working on the set when the COVID-19 lockdown occurred. In the meantime, Jude directed Sara's with Anna Ben and Sunny Wayne. The cast and crew of 2018 were also working in other projects, in the meantime.

"We all witnessed what happened during the floods. We saw the visuals through the news report. I began to conceptualise the film around the lives of ordinary people, and this is how the narrative began." – Jude. Jude Anthony said that Tovino's character was inspired by a news report that cited the incident of a man drowning during the rescue operations.

=== Casting ===
In October 2019, Manju Warrier, Indrajith Sukumaran, Jayasurya, Kunchako Boban, Asif Ali, Indrans, and Tovino Thomas were all reported to be part of the cast. Jude had earlier mentioned in an interview that there would be Tamil actors in the film. However, Jayasurya dropped out of the project due to conflicts with Rojin Thomas’ Kathanar. Tovino was cast to play a former soldier who had gone AWOL with Tanvi Ram cast to play an important role. The portions of the film that featured Tovino and Ram were shot in 2019. Vineeth Sreenivasan, Aparna Balamurali, Narain, Kalaiyarasan, Aju Varghese, Lal, Gauthami Nair and Sshivada were all confirmed to be part of the cast.

=== Filming ===
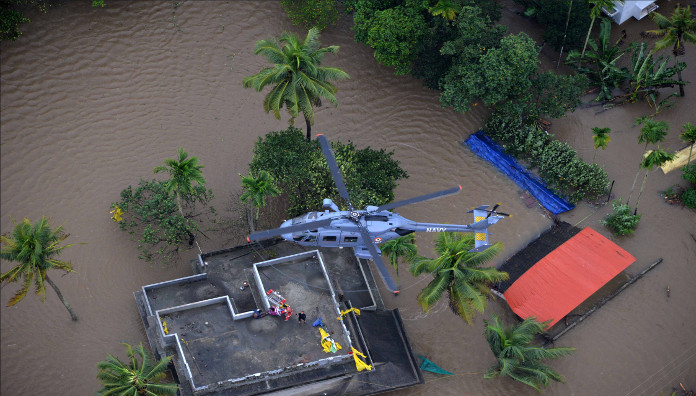
Rescue operations conducted by the Indian Navy during 2018 Kerala floods inspired the helicopter rescue segment in the film.

Principal photography commenced in October 2019. The first schedule of the film was shot in Kalady. The schedule progressed in Thodupuzha. The first schedule was wrapped on 21 October 2019 which featured scenes with Tovino Thomas and Tanvi Ram. Shooting was put on hold due to the COVID-19 pandemic in 2020 and was expected to resume in June 2022. Shooting resumed on 28 May 2022 with Kunchako Boban joining the set.

Jude Anthony Joseph and art director Mohandas Pallakkotil discussed designing the sets in 2019, and how to present the flooding and rescue operations on-screen. Pallakkotil had worked on the sets of the film for several months before convincing the producers to show places being damaged by the flooding. The decision to use real water to depict the flooding was made due to financial restrictions on using high-quality graphics. They began building miniature houses to show water rushing into the houses and raising water levels. The major shots of the flood were done on a 22-acre film set site at Maravanthuruthu near Vaikom. A 2-acre water tank was constructed on the set, filled with water and underwater sequences were shot. 14 houses were built in total, which were then transformed into different houses as per need. Electric posts, plants, and trees were made up of water-resistant materials. The sea sequence featuring Asif Ali, Lal, and Narain had a boat that was approaching the shore and also a ship, which was generated by CGI, and the other portions were filmed using artificial lights. The airlift scene, which was shot over a span of eight nights. It took them 1.4 million to build the helicopter using construction sets to generate the scene in the film. The scenes were shot from June to July during the height of rainfall to make the background look natural. The scenes that had Idukki Dam were also created using a set. The scene showing a flooded Aluva river was shot in August 2022, where the Aluva river overflooded during that time, and the shots showing actors walking on floodwaters were actually filmed.

Filming was completed on 13 November 2022. The film's shooting took place across 102 days, in 120 locations including Thrissur, Ernakulam, Kottayam, Alappuzha, Idukki, Kollam, and Tirunelveli. According to Jude, the film was made on a cost of ₹260 million, including all expenses, such as hotel stays.

== Release ==
=== Theatrical ===
The film was reported to be theatrically released in January 2023, but was delayed. Scheduled for release on 21 April 2023, the film was postponed and subsequently released on 5 May 2023 in Kerala. The Hindi, Tamil and Telugu dubbed versions were released on 26 May 2023. Anand Pandit released the Hindi dubbed version, which was distributed by E4 Entertainment. The Telugu dubbed version was released by Bunny Vas of GA2 Pictures.

=== Home media ===
SonyLIV obtained the digital rights and began streaming it on 7 June 2023. Apart from Malayalam, it was dubbed into Tamil, Kannada, Telugu and Hindi.

== Music ==
The soundtrack and background score were composed by Nobin Paul. The first song "Minnal Minnane" composed by William Francis was released on 28 April 2023.

== Reception ==
=== Box office ===
2018 was a commercial success at the box office, grossing over ₹177 crore (US$18 million) globally, thereby becoming the highest-grossing Malayalam film of all time.

On its opening day it earned ₹2 crore in Kerala, grossed more than ₹3 crore on Saturday and ₹4.01 crore on Sunday to ₹9.17 crore in three days in Kerala. 13,671 tickets were sold in three days in Kavitha Theatre, Ernakulam, collecting ₹18.14 lakh. The film received a warm response in Tamil Nadu. Multiplexes in Chennai were to include additional shows, with the dubbed Tamil version slated for release on 12 or 19 May 2023. In Karnataka it grossed ₹1.17 crore in 4 days. The film collected over ₹320 million by its fourth day. The film grossed ₹500 million within one week of its release. The film grossed ₹800 million in its nine days of release. It became the fastest Malayalam film to earn ₹1 billion (US$10 million) in 10 days after its release. By May 21, 2023, the film collected ₹1 crore from Aries Plex Thiruvananthapuram. By its 17th day it grossed over ₹1.376 billion (US$14 million) with ₹650 million from Kerala and ₹90 million from other states. On its 22nd day, it reached ₹1.5 billion (US$16 million) grossing over ₹750 million from Kerala and ₹650 million from overseas. By this time the film surpassed Pulimurugan to emerge as the highest grossing Malayalam film of all time. It grossed ₹1.53 billion (US$16 million) crore with ₹870 million from India and ₹660 million from overseas in 23 days. It also surpassed Pulimurugan in the Kerala box office grossing over ₹800 million to become the highest grosser in the state. The Telugu version released on May 26, 2023, in the states of Andhra Pradesh and Telangana grossed over ₹54.7 million in 4 days. It grossed ₹1.6 billion (US$17 million) in 25 days. As of June 9, 2023, the film grossed ₹870 million from Kerala also taking its worldwide gross to more than ₹1.7 billion (US$18 million). It grossed $85,229 in New Zealand, $288,293 in Australia, $842,933 in the United Kingdom and $3.6 million in the United Arab Emirates.

=== Critical response ===
On the review aggregator website Rotten Tomatoes, 100% of 7 critics' reviews are positive, with an average rating of 6.3/10.

Gopika Is of The Times of India gave a rating of 4 out of 5 stars and wrote "The quality of the writing shows and Akhil P. Dharmajan and Jude has done a commendable job. Cinematography by Akhil George needs special mention. Add Chaman Chacko's editing and quality VFX, the movie is a good watch." Anandu Suresh of The Indian Express gave 4 out of 5 stars and wrote "The makers quickly establish that rain is a pervasive and influential character in the movie."

Janani K. of India Today gave 3.5 out of 5 stars and wrote "Director Jude Anthany Joseph's 2018 is a film that reminds us of the Kerala floods. It is also a reminder that humanity still exists and how solidarity matters when survival is in question." Jose K. George of The Week gave 3.5 out of 5 stars and wrote "The movie's tagline says it all. This isn't the story of extraordinary people; this is the story of, and tribute to, ordinary people who became extraordinary because of their willingness to risk their lives for total strangers."

Sanjith Sidhardhan of OTTPlay gave 3.5 out of 5 stars and wrote "Aided by a gripping storyline and stirring moments, Jude Anthany Joseph's 2018 tells the story of hope and resilience, and serves as a reminder of how the Kerala floods was a great leveller." Telangana Today wrote "2018 is a must-watch film for its engaging narration and superior technical standards. One cannot miss this best presentation of humanity on the big screen." S. R. Praveen of The Hindu noted "Jude Anthany Joseph's technically solid recreation of the floods is a message of unity too."

Princy Alexander of Onmanorama wrote "Jude Anthany Joseph's '2018: Everyone is a Hero' is a well-balanced film that will leave you satisfied, and keep you engaged till the end." Anna M. M. Vetticad of Firstpost rated the film 2.5 out of 5 stars, stating that "This is definitely not the sort of film that has the intellect to treat with empathy a man's desire to rise above his family's station in life even while judging him for being judgmental towards them." Serene Sarah George of Film Companion wrote, " In the polarized times we live in, we can sure do with a solid reminder of the power of togetherness."

== Awards and honours ==
On 27 September 2023, the film was selected as the India's official entry by Film Federation of India for Best International Feature Film at the 96th Academy Awards, although it failed to make the cut when the shortlisted films were announced.

List of awards
Year (Note: Refers to the year in which the ceremony was held.)	Award	Category	Recipient	Result	Ref.
2024	69th Filmfare Awards South	Best Film – Malayalam	Anto Joseph, C.K. Padmakumar and Venu Kunnappilly, producers	Won	
2024	69th Filmfare Awards South	Best Director – Malayalam	Jude Anthany Joseph	Won	

== See also ==
- Operation Madad (Indian Navy) – rescue operations conducted by Indian Navy
- List of submissions to the 96th Academy Awards for Best International Feature Film
- List of Indian submissions for the Academy Award for Best International Feature Film
