= Press Institute of India =

Indian non-profit organization

Press Institute of India (PII) is a non-profit organization that was founded in 1963 for the development of standards of journalism in India. It conducts workshops on development journalism, women empowerment and child rights, national security, foreign policy and plain writing-reporting-editing. First founded in New Delhi, PII later shifted to the Research in Newspaper Development (RIND) office in the C. P. T. Campus, Taramani, Chennai. Its present director is journalist-editor Sashi Nair.
