= Balan Madhavan =

Indian nature conservation photographer

- Education: BA (Econ.)
- Occupation: Photographer
- Spouse: Latha Mangesh
- Parents: N.Madhavan Pillai (IFS) (father); Valsala Devi (mother)
- Website: www.balanmadhavan.in

Balan Madhavan is an Indian nature conservation photographer. He is a Senior Fellow of the International League of Conservation Photographers.

== Life and work ==
Madhavan runs the N Madhavan Pillai Foundation for Conservation Communication, which awards the annual Madhavan Pillai Conservation award to forest guides and workers.

In 2017 he traveled to Antarctica on a photo expedition. An exhibition of the photographs from the expedition he led was held in Thiruvananthapuram.

Madhavan was invited to the membership of the International League of Conservation Photographers in 2009.

== Publications ==
- Sanctuary for the soul of Kerala Tourism
- Periyar in Her Elements
- Water Taken for Granted

== Awards ==
He was the recipient of the Keizo Yamaji UNEP Photography Prize in 1992. The competition was organized by the United Nations Environment Programme and Canon Inc. and encapsulated the theme "Focus on your world" and prizes were announced at the World Environment Day ceremonies in Rio de Janeiro on 5 June 1992.
