= Oru Muthassi Gadha =

- Theatrical release poster
- Directed by: Jude Anthany Joseph
- Written by: Jude Anthany Joseph
- Story by: Nivin Pauly (credited for "story idea")
- Produced by: A. V. Anoop; Mukesh R. Mehtha
- Starring: Rajini Chandy; Bhagyalakshmi; Suraj Venjaramoodu; Lena; Aparna Balamurali; Rajeev Pillai
- Cinematography: Vinod Illampally
- Edited by: Lijo Paul
- Music by: Shaan Rahman
- Production companies: AVA Productions; E4 Entertainment
- Distributed by: E4 Entertainment
- Release date: 14 September 2016
- Country: India
- Language: Malayalam

Oru Muthassi Gadha (transl. A Granny's Mace) is a 2016 Indian Malayalam-language road comedy film written and directed by Jude Anthany Joseph from a story by Nivin Pauly. It stars Rajini Chandy and Bhagyalakshmi in the lead roles of two grandmothers, with supporting characters played by Suraj Venjaramoodu, Lena, Vineeth Sreenivasan, Rajeev Pillai, and Renji Panicker. Oru Muthassi Gadha was released on 14 September 2016 during Kerala's state festival, Onam.

== Plot ==
It narrates the story of a wealthy grandmother, Susamma, who helps to change her daughter Jeena's mother-in-law Leelamma's repressed behaviour by fulfilling her bucket list. Later they together start a make a wish group for elderly and abandoned people.

Sibi lives with his wife Jeena, daughter Alice, son Alan and his elderly mother, Leelamma, in Kochi. Leelamma is ill-tempered and meddles with everyone and harasses the hired help. Due to her harassment, nobody agrees to work for them until Babu, a Bengali worker agrees to work for them. Leelamma surprisingly gets along well with Babu and the family gets some respite for a while. At his Boss' suggestion, he decides to go on a family trip.

However, on the day before the trip Leelamma due to an altercation with Sibi, backs out of the trip. Sibi and his family decide to continue with the planned trip and call up Sibi's Mother-in-law, Susamma to keep her company. Susamma is sociable and modern in outlook, she is well versed with technology and open to new age fun. After some initial well-meaning tiffs Leelamma and Susamma bond with each other. The two along with Babu decide to celebrate Leelamma's birthday and complete her bucket wish list. On one night after a celebratory round of drinks, Leelamma starts narrating her love story from her college days involving her then classmate Zachariah. She, however, passes out before she can finish her story. The next day, she wakes up to an eager Susamma waiting for the ending. Leelamma continues to say she broke up with him and regrets that she could not meet him.

Susamma finds all this pent up anger in Leelama is due to this absence of closure in her early life and decides to find Zachariah. They initially planned on going with Babu but the next day, they realise he had left the place without informing them. Not knowing what to do, as Susamma could not drive too far places, they had asked the help of Alice, their granddaughter whose boyfriend, Milind, tagged along as someone might harass Alice. Together with Leelamma, Alice and Milind, Susamma visits Zachariah's native place, Kurathikad. They unexpectedly find Babu there with their neighbour's daughter and finds out he isn't a Bengali but acted as such to stay in touch with his lover. Along with some help from Babu, Leelamma's old classmate Kurup and his grandson, Briley, they locate the now aged Zachariah. However, upon meeting with Zachariah, Leelamma slaps him and leaves from there immediately.

On the way back to an angered Susamma, Leelamma reveals that, she had purposefully misled Susamma with the ending of her love story to slap Zachariah who had left Leelamma to fly to the USA on a scholarship after jilting her through a letter and that now she feels relieved. Leelamma and Susamma, later go to an old age home and reveals their plan to institute a programme called 'Oru Muthassi Gadha' whereby every month they help complete one wish off one inmate which they never had a chance to fulfil in their youth. The pair then proceeds with Babu to Airport to fly America and complete the remaining items on Leelamma's bucket list.

== Cast ==
- Rajini Chandy as Leelamma
- Aparna Balamurali in a dual role as
  - young Leelamma
  - Alice
- Bhagyalakshmi as Susaamma
- Suraj Venjaramoodu as Siby
- Lena as Jeena
- Vineeth Sreenivasan (younger) and Sreenivasan (older) as Zachariah
- Rajeev Pillai as Milind
- Ramesh Pisharody as Aloshy
- Jude Anthany Joseph in a dual role as:
  - Brilly
  - Kurup
- Vijayaraghavan as Anil Sir
- Renji Panicker as Dr. Mathew / Mathai (Reprising his role from Ohm Shanthi Oshaana)
- Manju Satheesh as Annie (Reprising her role from Ohm Shanthi Oshaana)
- Lal Jose as himself
- Baby Meenakshi as Street dancer
- K. T. S. Padannayil as Colonel
- Sathi Premji as Sathi
- Musthafa as Zacharia's son
- Kulappulli Leela
- Krishnaprasad as Bengali Babu/Appu
- Divya M Nair as Nurse
- Surjith Gopinath as Gypsy Singer
- Adish Praveen as Pittosh

== Production ==
Oru Muthassi Gadha is the second feature film of director-actor Jude Anthany Joseph. In February 2016, Joseph announced the film through his Facebook page along with its first-look poster. Due to disinterest from Mollywood's leading actresses, director Joseph hired fresh faces for the film through casting calls. Principal photography began in March 2016.

While it stars newcomers in the lead roles, it also features Vineeth Sreenivasan, Rajeev Pillai, and Renji Panicker in supporting roles who were also part of Joseph's debut venture, Ohm Shanthi Oshaana. Namitha Pramod signed into play the role of granddaughter but later opted out due to date issues and was replaced by Aparna Balamurali . On 27 August 2016, director Joseph introduced "Rowdy Leelamma", played by a newcomer, who is one of the two central characters of the film.

== Music ==
The soundtrack was released by Muzik247 on 4 September 2016 with songs composed by Shaan Rahman and D. Imman lyrics written by Harinarayanan B K.

Oru Muthassi Gadha

Soundtrack album by Shaan Rahman
- Released: 4 September 2016
- Genre: Film soundtrack
- Length: 10:05
- Language: Malayalam
- Label: Muzik 247
- Producer: Shaan Rahman

No.	Title	Lyrics	Singer(s)	Length
1.	"Thennal Nilavinte"	Harinarayanan B K	Vineeth Sreenivasan, Aparna Balamurali	03:47
2.	"Nakkile Prakkukal"	Harinarayanan B K	Mano	03:11
3.	"Oronnoronnayi"	Harinarayanan B K	Rahul Jayachandran, Shaan Rahman	03:07
4.	"Jam Thakida Jam"	Harinarayanan B K	Shaan Rahman

== Release ==
Oru Muthassi Gadha released on 14 September 2016, during the occasion of Kerala's state festival, Onam in 50 theaters.

== Critical reception ==
The film received favorable reviews from critics. Times of India gave a rating of 3.5/5 and mentioned that Oru Muthassi Gadha is a film that will make you want to give your dear and near a call and have a hearty chat.

Rediff gave a rating of 3/5 and commented that Oru Muthassi Gadha is worth watching and said that 'The director works as if he has a magic wand that makes this theme, which is not exactly fresh - engaging'.

Malayala Manorama gave a rating of 3.25/5 and said that 'Overall, with some decent performances, Oru Muthassi Gadha could be a good pick for families with it'

== See also ==
- The Bucket List
- Gada (mace)
- Oru Muthassi Kadha
