= Idi Minnal Kadhal =

- Theatrical release poster
- Directed by: Balaji Madhavan
- Written by: Balaji Madhavan
- Produced by: Jayachander Pinnamneni; Balaji Madhavan
- Starring: Ciby Bhuvana Chandran; Bhavya Trikha; Yasmin Ponnappa; Jay Adithya; Jagan; Radha Ravi; Balaji Sakthivel
- Cinematography: Jayachander Pinnamneni
- Edited by: Anthony
- Music by: Sam CS
- Production company: Pavaki Entertainment
- Distributed by: Dream Warrior Pictures
- Release date: 29 March 2024
- Running time: 131 minutes
- Country: India
- Language: Tamil

Idi Minnal Kadhal (transl. Thunder, lightning, love) is a 2024 Indian Tamil-language suspense thriller film written and directed by debutant Balaji Madhavan and produced by Pavaki Entertainment. It stars Ciby Bhuvana Chandran, Bhavya Trikha, Yasmin Ponnappa, Jay Adithya, Jagan, Radha Ravi and Balaji Sakthivel in central roles.

The film began its production in March 2022 with filming primarily taking place in Chennai and Yelagiri. Following a three-month rigorous schedule, the film completed its shoot in July 2022.

The film released theatrically on 29 March 2024. The Tamil Nadu theatrical release rights of the film were acquired by Dream Warrior Pictures.

== Plot ==
Characters undo the wrongs that they have done against each other in the aftermath of an accident.

== Cast ==
- Ciby Bhuvana Chandran as Haran
- Bhavya Trikha as Janani
- Yasmin Ponnappa as Anjali
- Radha Ravi as Father Edwin
- Balaji Sakthivel as Govindraj
- Jay Adithya as Abhishek Jain
- Jagan as Raja
- Vincent Nagul as Arul Pandian
- Manoj Mullath as Ritesh Jain
- Mona Bedre as Soniya
- Aruldoss as Saami

== Production ==
Balaji Madhavan had previously assisted Mysskin over a period of four years before joining R. Madhavan in his directorial debut Rocketry: The Nambi Effect. Over the course of this period, Balaji Madhavan came up with the plot for what would soon become Idi Minnal Kadhal. He then pitched the film to Jayachander Pinnamneni, his childhood friend, who is also the cinematographer of the film. They met up with a few investors and along with them, produced the film. The pre-production took place from March 2022 to May 2022.

In May 2022, the central characters were finalised and announced in the film's puja. The cinematography was to be handled by Jayachander Pinnamneni. Music and editing were assigned to award-winners Sam CS and Anthony respectively. Filming took place in Chennai and Yelagiri in three schedules over a span of 27 days. All post-production work for the film was carried out in intervals from October 2022 to October 2023.

== Soundtrack ==
Idi Minnal Kadhal

Soundtrack album by Sam CS
- Released: 2024
- Recorded: 2022–24
- Genre: Feature film soundtrack
- Length: 14:57
- Language: Tamil
- Producer: Sam CS

Sam CS chronology
Parking (2023)	Idi Minnal Kadhal (2024)	Siren (2024)

The music for the film has been composed by Sam CS. The first single "Siragaatchi Poove" was released at the film's audio and trailer launch on 21 March 2024. The lyrics were penned by lyricist Kabilan.

Idi Minnal Kadhal Soundtrack
No.	Title	Singer(s)	Length
1.	"Siragaatchi Poove"	Kapil Kapilan, Priyanka NK	3:30
2.	"Aagayam Illaamale"	Madhu Balakrishnan	4:02
3.	"Adikadi Adi"	Maalavika Sundar, Sathya Prakash	3:50
4.	"Netru Kandein"	R.P. Krishaang	3:35
Total length:			14:57

== Release ==
The film is slated for theatrical release on 29 March 2024. The Tamil Nadu theatrical release rights of the film have been acquired by Dream Warrior Pictures.

=== Reception ===
A critic from Times Now rated the film three out of five stars and wrote that "Idi Minnal Kadhal may not be a perfect action entertainer but it by no means is boring. In other words, this is a decent attempt at narrating a fresh story that looks to drive home a significant message".

Sreejith Mullappilly of Cinema Express stated that “The most interesting character in Idi Minnal Kadhal is Yasmin Ponnappa’s Anjali”.
