= Jude Anthany Joseph =

Indian film director, screenwriter, actor

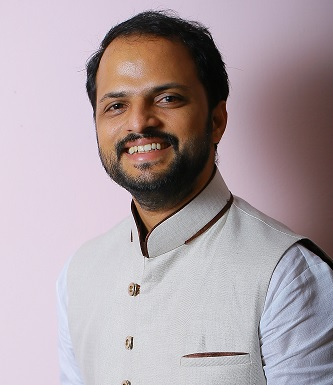
- Joseph in 2015
- Born: Sijo Joseph
- Education: L.B.S College of Engineering
- Occupations: Film director; screenwriter; actor
- Years active: 2008–present
- Spouse: Diyana Ann James (m. 2015)

Jude Anthany Joseph (born Sijo Joseph) is an Indian film director, screenwriter and actor, who works in Malayalam film industry. His directorial debut was with Ohm Shanthi Oshaana in 2014, which won the Best Film with Popular Appeal and Aesthetic Value at the 45th Kerala State Film Awards. His film 2018 received positive reviews and grossed around ₹200 crores (US$25 million) at the box office to emerge as the highest-grossing Malayalam film of all time. On 27 September 2023, the film was chosen by the Film Federation of India as India's official entry for Best International Feature Film at the 96th Academy Awards.

== Personal life ==
Jude Anthany Joseph was born Sijo Joseph. He legally changed his name to Jude Anthany Joseph in 2014, over his affinity towards Jude the Apostle. He is graduated in B-tech Electronics & Communication Engineering from LBS Engineering College, Kasaragod in 2005. Jude married Diyana Ann James on 14 February 2015.

== Film career ==
He started his film career with Crazy Gopalan (2008). After that he was assistant director in Malayalam films, Malarvaadi Arts Club (2010) and Thattathin Marayathu (2012). He has also directed two short films, one named Yellow Pen (2012) in which Aju Varghese played the lead role, and the other based on Malayalam movie actor Mammootty's life, titled Mammookka's Biography. Even though the short film was completed in 2011, this was released to public through YouTube only in February 2014. The short film went viral in a short time and garnered around 59,000 views in a span of one month. He made his directional movie debut through the Malayalam movie Ohm Shanthi Oshaana which was released in February 2014. His second film Oru Muthassi Gadha was released in September 2016.

in 2025, his next film Thudakam will mark debut of Vismaya Mohanlal.

== Other works ==
He also supports the campaign called 'Karigar Apnao Sanskriti Bachao Abhiyan' ('Adopt an Artisan, Save our Culture') for underprivileged artisans and has created a video for them. He paid for a home for the homeless in Kerala in the scheme created by Dr M.S. Sunil.

== Filmography ==
Key
†	Denotes films that have not yet been released

=== As director ===
Year	Title	Notes
2014	Ohm Shanthi Oshaana	Co-written with Midhun Manuel Thomas
2016	Oru Muthassi Gadha	Also screenwriter
2021	Sara's	Release on Amazon Prime Video
2023	2018	Co-written with Akhil P. Dharmajan
2026	Thudakkam	Co-written with Akhil Krishna and Linish Nellikkal

=== As writer ===
Year	Title	Notes
2026	Ashakal Aayiram	

=== As actor ===
Year	Title	Role	Notes
2015	Premam	Dolly D'Cruz	
2016	Action Hero Biju	Shinto	
2016	Vettah	Director	
2016	Oru Muthassi Gadha	Young Janardhana Kurup / Brilly	
2016	Thoppil Joppan	Thomaskutty	
2017	Velipadinte Pusthakam	Vijnanakoshy	
2017	Pokkiri Simon	Prisoner	
2018	Street Lights	Peeyush	
2018	Oru Kuttanadan Blog	Prakashan	
2018	Kayamkulam Kochunni	Brahmin	
2018	Ennaalum Sarath..?	Sreekanth	
2019	Love Action Drama	Driver Shinoj	
2019	Manoharam	Sudheendran	
2019	Vattamesha Sammelanam	Chandru	
2021	Minnal Murali	Aneesh	
2022	Varayan	Fr. Aju	
2022	Trojan		
2022	Upacharapoorvam Gunda Jayan	Manu	
2022	Udal	Reji/Jerry	
2022	Ela Veezha Poonchira	Vengayam (Policeman)	
2022	Sundari Gardens	Karnan Raghav	
2022	My Name is Azhakan	Subin	
2023	Voice of Sathyanathan	Gireesh	
2023	Master Peace	Fr. Savourias	Disney+ Hotstar web series
2023	Dance Party		
2023	Queen Elizabeth	Abin	
2024	Mandakini	SI Benny	
2024	Oru Anweshanathinte Thudakkam		
2025	Aap Kaise Ho		
2025	Mindiyum Paranjum		

=== Short films ===
Year	Title	Director	Notes
2014	Nakshathrangalude Rajakumaran	Himself	
2014	Yellow Pen	Himself	
2017	No Go Tell	Himself	
2020	Mattoru Kadavil Kuliscene 2	Rahul K Shaji	

=== Television ===
Year	Title	Role	Channel
2018–19	Dance Kerala Dance	Judge	Zee Keralam

== Awards ==
Year	Award	Category	Film	Result	Ref.
2014	Mohan Raghavan Memorial Award	Best Script	Ohm Shanthi Oshaana	Won	
2014	Kerala Film Critics Association Awards	Best Debutant Direction	Ohm Shanthi Oshaana	Won	
2015	Kerala State Film Awards	Best Film with Popular Appeal and Aesthetic Value	Ohm Shanthi Oshaana	Won	
2024	Filmfare Awards South	Best Director —Malayalam	2018	Won	
