= Baradwaj Rangan =

Indian film critic and journalist

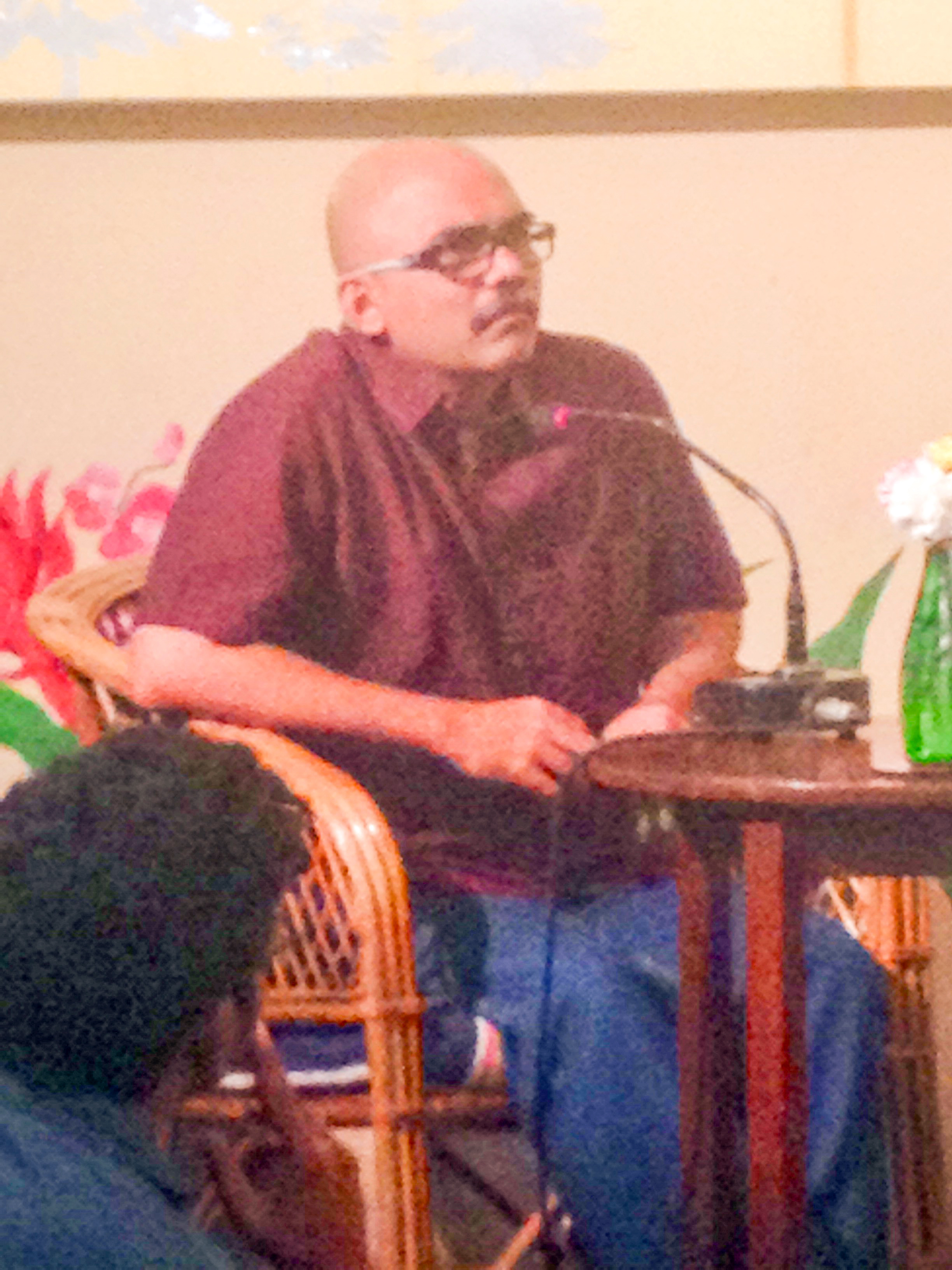
- Baradwaj Rangan in 2014
- Born: 1971 (age 54–55)
- Education: BITS Pilani
- Occupations: Film critic, writer
- Years active: 2003–present
- Awards: National Film Award for Best Film Critic
- Website: Official website

Baradwaj Rangan (/ˈbərəðwɑːdʒ ˈrənɡən/) is an Indian film critic and writer. A chemical engineering graduate with no formal training in filmmaking or cinema writing, he has a diverse career in advertising, IT consulting, and cinema writing. He has authored two books on Indian cinema, written for The New Indian Express, The Hindu, and Tehelka, and has also been a screenwriter.

As a film critic, Rangan won the Best Film Critic category at the 53rd National Film Awards in 2006. He was the editor of Film Companion South until 2022 and is a member of the Film Critics Circle of India. Rangan currently works as a critic and chief editor for Galatta Plus and runs a Spotify podcast Cinema With Baradwaj Rangan.

== Career ==
Baradwaj Rangan had no formal training in filmmaking or cinema writing. He is a chemical engineering graduate from BITS Pilani (1988–1992). According to him, it was a time when "parents considered only medicine or engineering" to be "serious professions", that he did not have interest but continued with it anyway. He notes that he was fascinated with writing and liked reading critical analyses on world cinema, especially those by American critics. Rangan was selected for a workshop by the Advertising Agencies Association of India (AAAI), Mumbai which led to him having a stint as a copywriter with J. Walter Thompson in Chennai. After that, Rangan received a full scholarship from the Marquette University, Milwaukee for a Master's degree in Advertising and Public relations, focusing on Internet advertising. Later, Rangan worked as an IT consultant in the United States for about five years.

Rangan still had the urge to write and started reviewing films for the website sitagita.com. That was when he was noticed by Sushila Ravindranath, then the editor of The New Sunday Express, the Sunday edition of The New Indian Express. Rangan worked there for two years, before shifting to The Hindu, which he became the deputy editor of. Rangan also wrote for the magazine Tehelka, while still working at The New Indian Express. His first review was of the Hindi film Dum, published on 30 January 2003 in the Madras Plus supplement of The Economic Times. Rangan has authored two books: Conversations with Mani Ratnam (2012), wherein he interviews film director Mani Ratnam on the perspectives of his films, and Dispatches From The Wall Corner: A Journey through Indian Cinema (2014), which he describes as a "panoramic view of Indian cinema". He also wrote an essay in Subramaniyapuram: The Tamil Film in English Translation (2014).

Rangan made his debut as a dialogue writer with Kadhal 2 Kalyanam, which never saw a theatrical release. He later wrote the screenplay for Kalki, a 2017 release. He also teaches a course on cinema at the Asian College of Journalism, Chennai. Rangan wrote the English narrative for the 2014 play Meghadootam: The Cloud Messenger. A short story written by him, The Call, was published in The Indian Quarterly magazine.

As of 2017, Rangan was the editor of Film Companion South, and left in 2022. He is also a member of the Film Critics Circle of India. In October 2018, Rangan was a guest speaker at India Film Project where he discussed about a critic's job and the role of criticism in the 'Insta Generation' along with critics Rajeev Masand and Vikramaditya Motwane. He currently works as a critic and chief editor for Galatta Plus. He also runs a Spotify podcast Cinema With Baradwaj Rangan. He played a cameo as himself in the 2018 film Seethakaathi and the 2023 video anthology series Modern Love Chennai, and played an antagonist in the 2024 film Weapon. He played a victim of one of Mithra (Anna Ben)'s scams in the 2026 film Con City.

== Awards ==
At the 53rd National Film Awards which took place in 2006, Rangan won in the Best Film Critic category. The citation given to him by the jury of the 53rd National Film Awards reads, "The Award is presented for intelligent and reader-friendly reviews of popular cinema with a depth of understanding of the form, a discernible passion for the medium bulwarked consistently by a knowledge of the trends and touchstones of global cinema." In 2013, Arul Mani of Tehelka described Rangan as "far and away the most intelligent writer we have in India when it comes to cinema".

== Works ==
- Conversations with Mani Ratnam (2012) Penguin UK, ISBN 9788184756906
- Dispatches from the Wall Corner: A Journey through Indian Cinema (2014) Westland, ISBN 9789384030568
