= Dabzee discography =

Discography of Indian rapper, singer and songwriter

Mohammed Fasil (born 30 May 1991), known professionally as Dabzee, is an Indian rapper, singer and songwriter from Kerala. He is well known for his film debut as a rapper with the song "Manavaalan Thug" from the movie Thallumaala.

== Film songs ==
| Year | Title | Film | Composer | Co-Artist(s) | Label | Notes | Ref. |
|---|---|---|---|---|---|---|---|
| 2022 | "Manavaalan Thug" | Thallumaala | MHR | SA | Muzik 247 | | |
| 2023 | "Mazaa Aagaya" | Jackson Bazaar Youth | Govind Vasantha | Titto P Thankachen, Jaffar Idukki | Think Music | | |
| 2023 | "Pirakilu Chirakathinoru Vaanam" | Jackson Bazaar Youth | Govind Vasantha | | Think Music | | |
| 2023 | "Olam Up" | Sulaikha Manzil | SHMR Music | Anarkali Marikar, Fathima Jahaan | Devil Inside | Promotional Track | |
| 2023 | "Kotha Raja" | King of Kotha | Jakes Bejoy | Asal Kolaar, Roll Rida, Resmi Sateesh | Sony Music | | |
| 2023 | "Mada Trance" | Pulimada | | Fathima Jaahan, Sarah Rose Joseph | Devil Inside | | |
| 2024 | "Illuminati" | Aavesham | Sushin Shyam | | Think Music | | |
| 2024 | "Vatteppam" | Mandakini | Bibin Ashok | | Saregama | | |
| 2024 | "K For Kurukku" | Guruvayoor Ambalanadayil | Ankit Menon | Rishi NK | Saregama | | |
| 2024 | "Aanne" | Little Hearts | Kailas Menon | Athul Narukara, Sruthy Sivadas | Sony Music | | |
| 2024 | "Manne Nambi" | Adios Amigo | Gopi Sundar | | Muzik 247 | | |
| 2024 | "Chandhune Tholpikkan Aavoollada" | Idiyan Chandhu | Deepak Dev | | Think Music | | |
| 2024 | "Blood – Version 1" | Marco | Ravi Basrur | Rohith Siddappa, Santhosh Venky | Sony Music | Version 2 was sung by Santhosh Venky | |
| 2025 | "Shavathkuth" | Pravinkoodu Shappu | Vishnu Vijay | Gayathri Rajeev, Devu Mathew, Geethu Nirmala | Sony Music | Lyrics by Muhsin Parari | |
| 2025 | "Bhoom Chikk Ba Ba" | Oru Vadakkan Pranaya Parvam | Gichu Joy | | 123Musix | | |
| 2025 | "Luka Amigo" | Innocent | Jay Stellar | Sraavan GN | Muzik247 | | |
| 2026 | "Patti Show" | Athiradi | Vishnu Vijay | Arivu, Suhail Koya | Saregama | | |
| 2026 | "Wedding party track" | Udumbanchola Vision | Gopi Sundar | | | | |

== Albums ==
| Year | Album title | Release Title(s) | Featuring Artist(s) | Label | Notes | Ref. |
|---|---|---|---|---|---|---|
| 2024 | 10 Gully | "Chathiyan" | M.H.R | Devil Inside, Mass Appeal India | | |
| 2024 | 10 Gully | "Oora" | ABRAW | Devil Inside, Mass Appeal India | | |
| 2024 | 10 Gully | "Malabari" | Fura, SA | Devil Inside, Mass Appeal India | | |
| 2024 | 10 Gully | "Kone" | SA, JOKER390P, M.H.R | Devil Inside, Mass Appeal India | | |
| 2024 | 10 Gully | "Maarijan" | SA, ABRAW | Devil Inside, Mass Appeal India | | |
| 2025 | DELKOCHI | "Mast Kalandar" | - | Mass Appeal India | | |
| 2025 | DELKOCHI | "Shunda Mandi" | Rishi Roy | Mass Appeal India | | |
| 2025 | DELKOCHI | "Chal" | Rishi Roy, Fathima Jahan | Mass Appeal India | | |
| 2025 | DELKOCHI | "Rakhlo" | Rishi Roy | Mass Appeal India | | |
| 2025 | DELKOCHI | "Soneya" | Rishi Roy, Fathima Jahan | Mass Appeal India | | |
| 2025 | DELKOCHI | "Sajna" | Rishi Roy | Mass Appeal India | | |

== Singles ==
| Year | Release Title | Featuring Artist(s) | Label | Notes | Ref. |
|---|---|---|---|---|---|
| 2022 | Bharaverse | Moeha, V3K | Glitch Collective | | |
| 2022 | Vecho Foot | Haris Saleem, Parimal Shais, Lakshmi Marikar, M.H.R | Twohorn | | |
| 2023 | Kali | Parimal Shais | Kappa TV | | |
| 2023 | Khalbum Katti | RXZOR | Devil Inside | | |
| 2023 | Ceasefire Now | MC Couper, Baby Jean | Kochi Music Foundation | | |
| 2023 | La Vida | Kshmr, Vedan | Dharma Productions, Mass Appeal India | | |
| 2023 | Sambar | ThirumaLi, ThudWiser, FEJO | Mass Appeal India | | |
| 2024 | Ballaatha Jaathi | NJ, Baby Jean | Universal Music India | | |
| 2024 | NISHANI | Rishi Roy | Mass Appeal India | | |
| 2024 | Alif | SA | Devil Inside | | |
| 2024 | Habibi Drip | Ribin Richard, Nivin Pauly | Pauly Jr. Pictures | | |
| 2024 | Vatteppam - EDM | Alvin Bruno | Saregama | | |
