= Mashar Hamsa =

Indian costume designer (born 1990)

- Born: Mashar Hamsa; 13 June 1990 (age 36); Tanur, Kerala, India
- Occupations: Costume designer (feature films and television ads)
- Years active: 2013–present
- Spouse: Mirsha (m. 2023)
- Awards: Kerala Film Critics Association Awards 2020

Mashar Hamsa (born June 1990) is an Indian costume designer from Kerala, who works in the Malayalam films. He started his career as a film costume designer in 2013 with the movie Neelakasham Pachakadal Chuvanna Bhoomi. As of April 2023, Mashar has designed costumes for more than 30 Malayalam films. He is a recipient of 2020 Kerala Film Critics Association Awards for best costume designer for the movie Trance.

== Film career ==
Initially, Mashar worked as a costume designer for several commercials. In 2013, he made his film debut as a costume designer in Neelakasham Pachakadal Chuvanna Bhoomi, directed by Sameer Tahir. Mashar first gained attention for his work in the 2016 Malayalam film Kammattippadam. Since then, he went on to design costumes for many films including the critically acclaimed Parava, Sudani From Nigeria, Varathan, Jallikkettu, Trance, Churuli, Thallumala and Romacham.

== Filmography ==
Year	Title	Director	Notes
2013	Neelakasham Pachakadal Chuvanna Bhoomi	Sameer Thaahir	
2014	Seconds	Aneesh Upasana	
2014	Masala Republic	Vysakh	
2015	Chandrettan Evideya	Sidharth Bharathan	
2015	Urumbukal Urangarilla	Jiju Asokan	
2016	Kali	Sameer Thahir	
2016	Kammatipaadam	Rajeev Ravi	
2016	Kismath	Shanavas K Bavakutty	
2016	Shajahanum Pareekuttiyum	Boban Samuel	
2017	Parava	Soubin Shahir	
2018	Diwanjimoola Grand Prix	Anil Radhakrishnan Menon	
2018	Sudani from Nigeria	Zakariya Mohammed	
2018	Varathan	Amal Neerad	
2019	Jallikattu	Lijo Jose Pellissery	
2019	Thamaasha	Ashraf Hamza	
2019	Unda	Khalid Rahman	
2019	And the Oscar Goes To...	Salim Ahamed	
2019	Ambili (film)	Johnpaul George	
2020	Trance	Anwar Rasheed	
2020	Halal Love Story	Zakariya Mohammed	
2021	Jan.E.Man	Chidambaram S Poduval	
2021	Churuli	Lijo Jose Pellissery	
2021	Ajagajantharam	Tinu Pappachan	
2021	Joji	Dileesh Pothan	
2021	Irul	Naseef Yusuf Izuddin	
2021	Bheemante Vazhi	Ashraf Hamza	
2022	Dear Friend	Vineeth Kumar	
2022	Thallumaala	Khalid Rahman	
2022	Chattambi	Abilash S Kumar	
2022	Padavettu	Liju Krishna	
2022	Naaradan	Aashiq Abu	
2022	Palthu Janwar	Sangeeth P. Rajan	
2023	Djinn	Sidharth Bharathan	
2023	Thankam	Saheed Arafath	
2023	Romancham	Jithu Madhavan	
2023	Kasargold	Mridul Nair	
2024	Manjummel Boys	Chidambaram S. Poduval	
2024	Aavesham	Jithu Madhavan	
2026	Bachelor Party D'eux	Amal Neerad	
