= Pushpavathy Poypadathu =

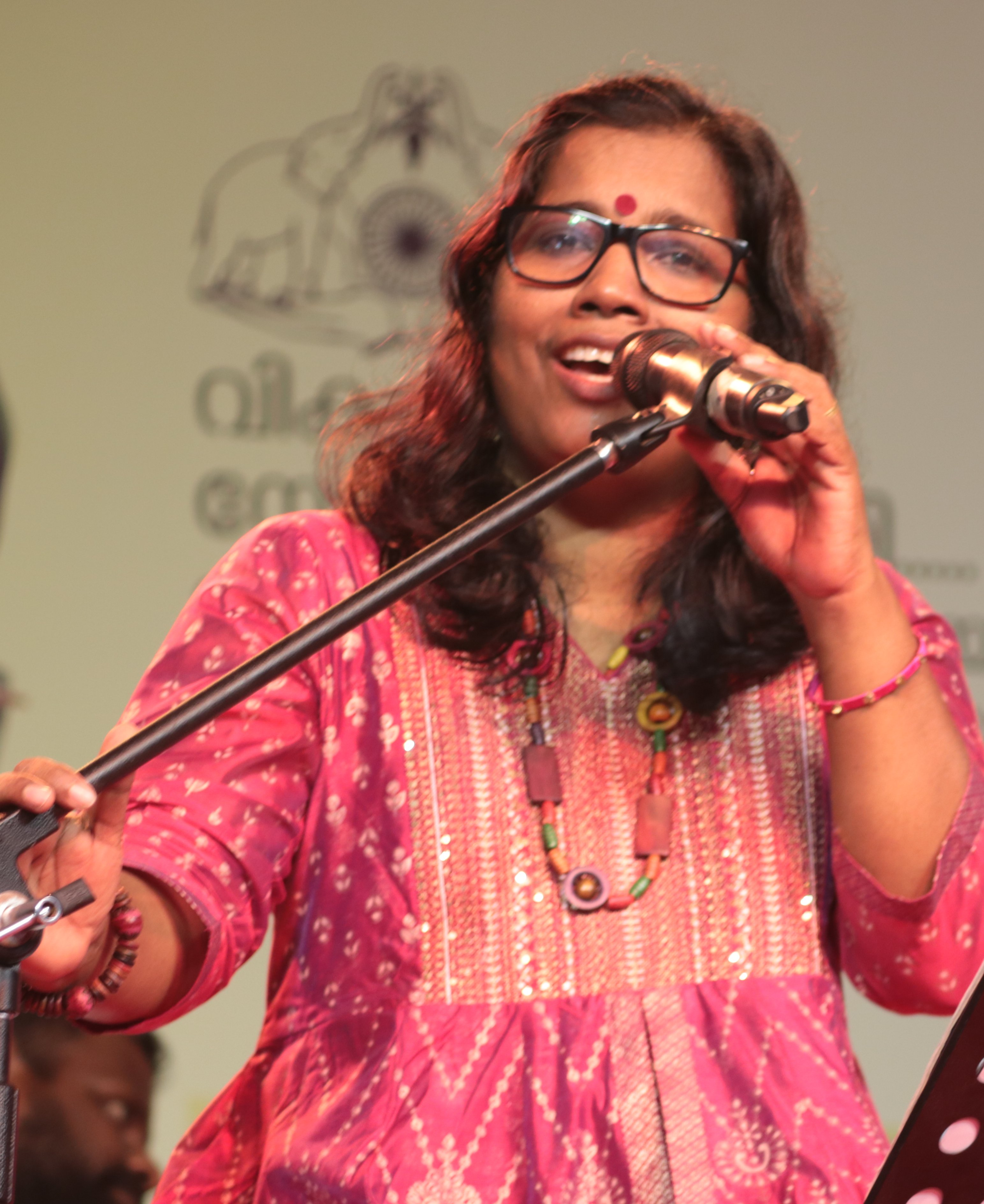

Background information
- Born: 30 May 1974 (age 52); Velur, Thrissur, Kerala, India
- Occupations: Playback singer, music director

Pushpavathy P R, also known as Pushpavathy Poypadathu is an Indian singer, composer and lyricist. Trained in Carnatic Vocal, Pushpavathy holds a Post Graduate Diploma (Ganapraveena) from Chembai Memorial Government Music College, Palakkad and received her advanced training under Guru Mangad Natesan (1994-2005). Pushpa's first directorial venture was a music album based on the Poems of Kabir (Kabir Music of Harmony 2005) which has won critical acclaim in many platforms and was a best seller too. Pushpavathy was a B grade artist with AIR (All India Radio) from 1999 to 2004. She is the vice chairperson of Kerala Sangeetha Nataka Akademi

== Awards ==
- 2001 Kerala Sangeetha Nataka Academy Puthukkode Krishnamoorthy Endowment Award
- 2012 Santhosham South Indian Film Awards for the Female Singer, Malayalam Song Champavu
- 2011 Vayalar Rama Varma Chalachitra TV Puraskarm, Best Female Singer
- 2014 Njaralathu Rama Poduval Purskaram
- 2016 Advocate R. Shiva Prasad Smaraka Award
- Scholarship from Dept. of Culture- Govt. India (2001-2003).

=== As playback singer ===
Year	Film	Song	Composer	Lyricist
2023	Sulaikha Manzil	Haalaake Maarunne	Vishnu Vijay	Mu.Ri
2023	Charles Enterprises	Ganapathi Charitham	Subrahmanian K V.	Sangeetha Chenampully
2021	Aarkkariyam	Kinarile	Yakzan Gary Pereira, Neha Nair	Anwar Ali (poet)
2019	Njan petta makane	Muruvettu vezhunna	Bijibal	Murukan Kattakada
2019	Udalazham	Poomathe Ponnamma	Sithara (singer), Mithun Jayaraj	Manu Manjith
2019	Daivam Sakshi	Ninteappan kallukudichu	Bishoy Aniyanj	Engandiyoor Chandrasekharan
2019	Dakini	Eka Thalamayitha	Gopi Sundar	Hari Narayanan
2018	Kayamkulam Kochunni (2018 film)	Nrithageethikalennum	Gopi Sundar	Shobin Kannangatt
2017	Chicken Kokkachi	Minnaminni koodai	Jassie Gift	Manu Manjith
2017	Thrissivaperoor Kliptham	Thrissooru	Bijibal	P. S. Rafeeque
2014	Vikramadithyan	'Manathe chandana keeru	Bijibal	Engandiyoor Chandrasekharan
2014	Balyakalasakhi	Aa nammalu kandillenna	Shahabaz Aman	Kavalam Narayana Panicker
2014	Ulsaha Committee	Mary thuduthoru Mary	Bijibal	Engandiyoor Chandrasekharan
2013	God for Sale	Kavery poom pattanathil	Afzal Yusuf	M T Pradeepkumar
2011	Salt N' Pepper	Chembavu punellin choro	Bijibal	Rafeeq Ahammed
2010	Choonda	Thairkudam thakarthuvo née	Mohan Sithara	Yusufali Kechery
2008	Chandranilekkoru vazhi	Sree palkadavil pallikollum	Afzal Yusuf	Kavalam Sreekumar
2005	Udayon	Poondankila thozuthu kuriche	Ouseppachan	Lakshmi Shrikumar
2004	Koottu	Marchu masamayi	Mohan Sithara	Girish Puthenchery
2002	Nakshathrakkannulla Rajakumaran Avanundoru Rajakumari	Punjiri mottinu poo azhaku	Benni Kannan	S. Ramesan Nair
2002	Nammal	Kathu kathoru Mazayathu	Mohan Sithara	Kaithapram Damodaran Namboothiri

== Albums ==
Year	Album title	Song title	Lyricist	Composer
2004	Kabir Music of Harmony e	"Aparichithanallo"	Kabir Das	herself
2004	Kabir Music of Harmony e	Evide thirayunnu née enne	Kabir Das	herself
2004	Kabir Music of Harmony e	Punya theerthangalilellam	Kabir Das	herself
2004	Kabir Music of Harmony e	Evide thirayunnu née enne	Kabir Das	herself
2004	Kabir Music of Harmony e	Etho Chathuppil	Kabir Das	herself
2004	Kabir Music of Harmony e	Neela vanam	Kabir Das	herself
2004	Kabir Music of Harmony e	Sudinamee dinam	Kabir Das	herself
2004	Kabir Music of Harmony e	Virahiniyayoru yuvathi	Kabir Das	herself
2004	Kabir Music of Harmony e	Pallakketthi thi	Kabir Das	herself
2012	Malayalam Lullabies	Sooriyanu mazhiyil mungi	Raghavan Thirumulpad	herself
2012	Malayalam Lullabies	Vegam Urangu makale	K. Satchidanandan	herself
2012	Malayalam Lullabies	Neela kadalil ninnamma kale	Anitha Thampi	herself
2014	Sree Narayana Guru Darshanam	Daiva Dasakam	Sree Narayana Guru	herself
2014	Sree Narayana Guru Darshanam	Anukampa Dasakam	Sree Narayana Guru	herself
2014	Sree Narayana Guru Darshanam	Kundalini Pattu	Sree Narayana Guru	herself
2015	Madavikutty Ghazalukalm	Ariyunnu priyane nin pranayam		herself
2015	Madavikutty Ghazalukalm	Nee en kaniyam		herself
2016	Tagore's Geethanjali	Mindathirunnal	Tagore	herself
2016	Tagore's Geethanjali	Anathamam sagarathil	Tagore	herself
2016	Tagore's Geethanjali	Oru Theerthadanam	Tagore	herself
2016	Tagore's Geethanjali	Kodumkattukal	Tagore	herself
