= Kerala Underground =

Indian Malayalam reality television series

- Genre: Reality television; Music competition
- Directed by: Lendrick Kumar
- Presented by: Aathira Rajeev
- Starring: Dabzee; MC Couper; Imbachi; Parimal Shais
- Country of origin: India
- No. of episodes: 10

Production
- Producers: Sumesh Lal; Sujith Unnithan; Lakshmi Venugopal
- Production company: Wonderwall Media

Original release
- Network: Zee 5
- Release: 28 August 2026

Kerala Underground is an Indian Malayalam-language hip-hop reality television series that premiered on Zee 5 in 2026. The series follows ten contestants, selected through open auditions, competing in rap performances over ten episodes for the title of Kerala's underground hip-hop champion. It is hosted by lucidrancer and directed by Lendrick Kumar.

== Format ==
Contestants receive guidance from four mentors drawn from Kerala's hip-hop scene: Dabzee, MC Couper, Imbachi and Parimal Shais, who work with participants on writing, performance and personal style over the course of the competition. The series was filmed at locations across Kerala.

== Cast ==
=== Contestants ===
Ten contestants competed on the series.

Contestants	Occupation	Status
Abhishek K. R.		TBA
Parvathi Nair		TBA
Prajwal PS		TBA
Gopikrishnan P		TBA
Rishikesh S Unni		TBA
Ibnu Shajil M		TBA
Mohammed Zeeshan		TBA
Muhammed Anas RT		TBA
Ahmed Hafeez Bin Salim		TBA
Lucid		TBA

=== Mentors ===
- Dabzee
- MC Couper
- Imbachi
- Parimal Shais

== Production ==
Kerala Underground was produced by Sumesh Lal, Sujith Unnithan and Lakshmi Venugopal under Wonderwall Media. It was directed by Lendrick Kumar, with cinematography by Ashwin Sumesh.

Ahead of the premiere, Zee Music Company released a promotional single, "Entha Haal", written and performed by MC Couper, Imbachi and Dabzee, with music by Parimal Shais and mixing by Akash Shravan.

== Release ==
Kerala Underground premiered on Zee 5 on 28 August 2026.
