= Alappuzha Gymkhana =

2025 Malayalam film by Khalid Rahman

- Theatrical release poster
- Directed by: Khalid Rahman
- Written by: Khalid Rahman; Sreeni Saseendran
- Dialogues by: Ratheesh Ravi
- Produced by: Khalid Rahman; Jobin George; Sameer Karat; Subeesh Kannanchery
- Starring: Naslen; Lukman Avaran; Ganapathi S. Poduval; Sandeep Pradeep; Franco Francis; Baby Jean; Shiva Hariharan
- Cinematography: Jimshi Khalid
- Edited by: Nishadh Yusuf
- Music by: Vishnu Vijay
- Production companies: Plan B Motion Pictures; Reelistic Studios
- Distributed by: Central Pictures
- Release date: 10 April 2025
- Running time: 139 minutes
- Country: India
- Language: Malayalam
- Box office: est.₹65 crore

Alappuzha Gymkhana (Note: Gymkhana is an Urdu word meaning sports club.) is a 2025 Indian Malayalam-language action sports film directed and produced by Khalid Rahman, who also co-wrote the screenplay with Sreeni Saseendran, with dialogues by Ratheesh Ravi. The film stars Naslen, Lukman Avaran, Ganapathi S. Poduval, Sandeep Pradeep, Franco Francis, Baby Jean and Shiva Hariharan.

Alappuzha Gymkhana was released theatrically on 10 April 2025. The film received positive reviews from critics and was a commercial success at box office. It has also emerged as the 8th highest-grossing Malayalam film of 2025.

== Plot ==
Jojo Johnson, David "DJ" John, Shifas "Valuth" Ahmed, Shifas "Cheruth" Ali, and Shanavas are five friends from Alappuzha who have just completed their 12th-grade board exams. While Shanavas passes, the rest of the group fails, leaving their prospects of college admission uncertain.

After Valuth gets into a scuffle for flirting with a state-level boxer's girlfriend Maria, Jojo begins researching alternative ways to enter college and discovers that sports quota admissions through boxing tournaments are a viable route. The group decides to pursue boxing and enroll at the local Alappuzha Gymkhana boxing school, under coach Salim. However, Shanavas soon loses interest and quits, while DJ switches to wrestling. Jojo, Valuth and Cheruth persist and are later mentored by Antony Joshua, a former student of Salim and a current state-level boxer training for the South Asia Championship. Antony enforces a strict training and diet plan, pushing them to their physical limits.

To earn a spot in the Kerala State Amateur Boxing Championship, the trio competes in the Alappuzha District Boxing Selection Championship. There, they qualify alongside three other boxers: Deepak, a self-taught fighter who learned through YouTube; Kiran, a returning participant who failed in the previous year's tournament; and Christopher. As the newly formed district team prepares for the state-level championship, Jojo develops feelings for Natasha, a fellow boxer from Alappuzha, though she remains uninterested.

At the championship venue, Jojo is unexpectedly bumped into a higher weight category due to overeating. The matches begin with a series of setbacks—Christopher loses his bout, followed by Valuth. Cheruth, however, emerges victorious in his round and earns widespread appreciation. Jojo enters the ring with confidence but loses his match. Disheartened by the team's performance, Kiran is reluctant to compete. However, motivated by his teammates’ support, he enters the ring and puts up a strong fight, ultimately losing by a narrow margin on points. Deepak puts up a strong performance but ultimately walks away mid-match after receiving threats aimed at his teammates and family. This incident pushes Antony—already revealed to be a suspended boxer with a history of violence—to snap and assault the individual who had issued the threats. With the situation escalating, the team withdraws from the tournament during Cheruth's second-round bout. On their way out, they are ambushed by a group of men, but they successfully defend themselves using their boxing skills.

Back home in Alappuzha, Natasha unexpectedly confesses her love for Deepak, helping Jojo find closure. Reinvigorated by their experience, the group decides to train harder and return the following year. Jojo takes on the role of team manager, while Shanavas and DJ prepare to join the team.

== Cast ==
- Naslen as Jojo Johnson
- Lukman Avaran as Antony Joshua
- Ganapathi S. Poduval as Deepak Panicker
- Sandeep Pradeep as Shifas "Valuth" Ahmed
- Franco Francis as Shifas "Cheruth" Ali
- Baby Jean as David "DJ" John, Jojo's cousin
- Shiva Hariharan as Shanavas K. L.
- Shon Joy as Kiran
- Karthik as Christopher
- Anagha Maya Ravi as Natasha Pallathuruthu
- Noila Francy as Sherin
- Audrey Miriam Henest as Maria
- Nanda Nishanth as Anupama
- Viswajith as Rocky Viswan
- Aarab as Raabi Chettan
- Abu Salim as Ashraf
- Kottayam Nazeer as Salim
- Assim Jamal as Roy
- Swathi Das Prabhu as Swathi
- Adhri Joe
- Alex Paul as Johnson, Jojo's father
- Manjusree Nair as Mini, Jojo's mother

=== Cameo Appearances ===
- Shine Tom Chacko as Andrews Clarson IPS
- Gokulan as Ambulance driver

== Production ==
The makers of this film released the title name and first look poster of the film on Instagram on 1 October 2024. The shooting of this film was completed in August 2024. The film's screenplay is written by Khalid Rahman and Sreeni Saseendran and dialogue is written by Ratheesh Ravi. Naslen plays the role of a boxer in this movie. The film is debut production film of Plan B Motion Pictures.

== Music ==
Alappuzha Gymkhana

Soundtrack album by Vishnu Vijay
- Released: 19 April 2025
- Genre: Feature film soundtrack
- Length: 38:56
- Language: Malayalam
- Label: Think Music

Vishnu Vijay chronology
Pravinkoodu Shappu (2025)	Alappuzha Gymkhana (2025)	Lovely (2025)
External audio
- Alappuzha Gymkhana – Jukebox on YouTube

The music composed by Vishnu Vijay. The audio rights of the film were acquired by Think Music.

Track listing
No.	Title	Lyrics	Singer(s)	Length
1.	"Everyday"	Suhail Koya	Sanjith Hegde, Vishnu Vijay	2:25
2.	"Pottu Pottu"	Suhail Koya	Vishnu Vijay	5:03
3.	"Hatja"	Suhail Koya	K. S. Harisankar, Vishnu Vijay	2:51
4.	"Alpy Xpress"	Suhail Koya, Amogh Balaji	Shakthisree Gopalan, Amogh Balaji, Vishnu Vijay	3:12
5.	"Cheruthu"	Amogh Balaji	Amogh Balaji	3:25
6.	"Panjara Punch"	Suhail Koya	Anthony Daasan, Vishnu Vijay	2:45
7.	"Do It"	Amogh Balaji	Amogh Balaji	5:37
8.	"Thakathei x Uppercut Hook"	Khalid Rahman	Naslen Gafoor	2:25
9.	"D-Day"	Amogh Balaji, Suhail Koya	Amogh Balaji, Suhail Koya	4:10
10.	"Varum Pokum"	Suhail Koya	Sangeeth, Vishnu Vijay	3:10
11.	"Boxing 101"	Suhail Koya	Suhail Koya	1:36
12.	"Welcome To Gymkhana"	Suhail Koya	Suhail Koya, Vishnu Vijay	2:17
Total length:				38:56

== Release ==
The film was theatrically released on 10 April 2025. The film released on SonyLiv from June 13 onwards.

== Reception ==
Alappuzha Gymkhana received positive reviews from critics. Aditya Shrikrishna in his review for OTTPlay wrote,"Alappuzha Gymkhana is not the film for that one great pep talk or one last fight to win it all. This is a film where even the coach is in such a bad place that he picks up a fight outside the ring. Khalid Rahman stages this free-for-all with panache, a fight that begins in a field, moves to a cul-de-sac and spills over to the road. It is a film about the comfortable crisis of misplaced confidence, which becomes the bedrock for solidarity. There is simply no place for cynicism, and no one is in a hurry to grow up." In his review for Mint, Uday Bhatia praised the film as a blissful boxing comedy writing,"There are shades of Richard Linklater's Dazed and Confused and Everybody Wants Some, films where the stakes are low and the world seems full of promise." Writing for Onmanorama, Swathi P Ajith mentioned,"This isn't your typical underdog sports drama. It's not about losing, failing, and crawling back to glory. It's about falling into a sport by chance, getting hooked, and letting it take over your life in the most unexpected ways." S R Praveen of The Hindu rated the film 3/5 writing,"The attempts to break cliches in a sports movie is an endeavour fraught with risks, for it also means not going along that easy path with an endless supply of emotional highs and cheap thrills. Alappuzha Gymkhana does not deliver much of the latter but makes up with a relatable tale that spares a thought for those not cut out to win. The film is written in such a way as to make us think that we wouldn't want it any other way."

Anandu Suresh of The Indian Express rated the film 3/5 and praised Khalid Rahman's direction writing,"From the very first scene, Rahman makes it clear what he aims to do with Alappuzha Gymkhana and he nails the tone at the outset itself, brilliantly maintaining it until the very end. At no point does he allow the movie to derail or take a detour just for the sake of it." Writing for The News Minute, Cris praised the film as a fun, engaging watch mentioning,"Calling the film a comforting, engaging joyride can seem ironic, given that director Khalid Rahman has placed it in the thick of a boxing ring. But that is exactly what it becomes." Sajin Shrijith of The Week described the movie as "a perfect hangout experience that evokes the vibe of Richard Linklater films" writing,"With Alappuzha Gymkhana, we sense the intention is not really about showing a story where the characters emerge victors, but rather putting them through trying and humiliating circumstances in order to make them figure out their real strengths and weakness, and, most importantly, purpose." Kirubakhar Purushottaman of News18 rated the film 4/5 and wrote,"In the end, Alappuzha Gymkhana isn't a film about victory in the ring, but one about resilience, camaraderie, and quiet transformation. It's like Richard Linklater's coming-of-age tale like Everybody Wants Some disguised as a sports drama—where the biggest wins are emotional rather than athletic. With its charming characters, understated writing, and grounded storytelling, Alappuzha Gymkhana punches far above its weight—and lands with lasting impact."

=== Box office ===
The film grossed ₹65 crore in 16 days and is currently sixth highest-grossing Malayalam film of the year.

== See also ==
- List of boxing films
