= Ashraf Hamza =

Malayalam film director

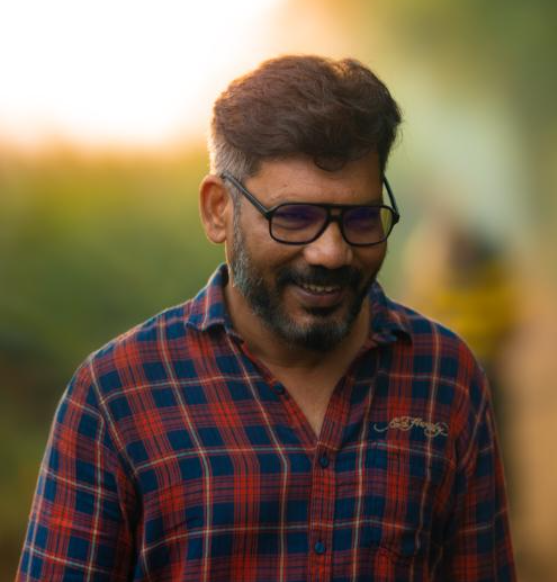
- Born: Ponnani, Kerala, India
- Occupations: Film director, screenwriter, actor
- Years active: 2018–present

Ashraf Hamza is an Indian film director and screenwriter who works in Malayalam cinema. Hailing from Ponnani, Malappuram, he debuted with 2019 Malayalam movie Thamaasha. His second directorial feature was Bheemante Vazhi (2021). He was the co-writer of the 2022 movie Thallumaala.

== Early life ==
He was born in Ponnani, Kerala. His father owned a movie theatre named 'Alankar' in Ponnani. Hamza has said that is where his enthusiasm for movies developed, as he spent much of his holidays at the theatre. Some of his childhood experiences with the movie theatre were included in the movie Thallumaala.

== Career ==
He started his career by directing a short film based on U. P. Jayaraj's short story 'Bihar'. Later he directed some documentaries, short films and ad films. It was his friendship with director Muhsin Parari that led to the possibility of doing a feature-length project. He was approached by Muhsin to write a movie after Muhsin's directorial debut KL 10 Patthu was failed to perform in box office, but the project was shelved (this was later turned out to be the 2022 movie Thallumaala). He was asked by Lijo Jose Pellissery and Chemban Vinod Jose to direct an independent adaptation of 2017 Kannada movie Ondu Motteya Kathe. Ashraf Hamza approached Sameer Thahir and Shyju Khalid with this project and they agreed to produce the movie along with Lijo Jose Pellissery and Chemban Vinod Jose. The project was conceived under the title Thamaasha and Sameer Thahir handled the cinematography with Vinay Forrt and Chinnu Chandni in lead roles. The movie was released on 19 June 2019 to critical acclaim.

His second directorial feature was Bheemante Vazhi, which was released in December 2021. Chemban Vinod Jose scripted and produced this movie with Kunchacko Boban as the lead. The movie was a moderate box office success and won critical acclaim. Thallumaala, his writing collaboration with Muhsin Parari was released in August 2022 and turned out to be one of the highest grossing Malayalam films.

His third movie as a director is Sulaikha Manzil with Lukman Avaran and Anarkali Marikar in lead roles. The movie was released in April 2023.

== Filmography ==
Year	Title	Director	Writer	Notes
2019	Thamaasha	Yes	Yes	Debut movie
2021	Bheemante Vazhi	Yes	No	
2022	Thallumaala	No	Yes	
2023	Sulaikha Manzil	Yes	Yes	

Acting roles
Year	Movie	Role	Notes
2018	Sudani from Nigeria	Doctor	

== Trivia ==
- Ashraf Hamza introduced Muhsin Parari as a lyricist. Muhsin was asked to complete the lines of Paadi Njan, an incomplete Mappilappaattu written by Pulikkottil Hyder into a full-length song for the movie Thamaasha. Later on Muhsin Parari wrote all the songs in all of Ashraf Hamza's movies.
- All of Ashraf Hamza's movies were shot in and around his hometown Ponnani. Except for Bheemante Vazhi, the plots were also set in Ponnani.
- Chemban Vinod Jose acted as the co-producer of all three movies directed by Ashraf Hamza and scripted one, Bheemante Vazhi.

== Controversy ==
On 27 April 2025, Hamza along with Khalid Rahman and another person was arrested from an Apartment nearby Goshree Bridge, Kochi by Excise Department for possession of 1.63 grams of Hybrid Cannabis.
