= Binu Pappu =

Indian film actor

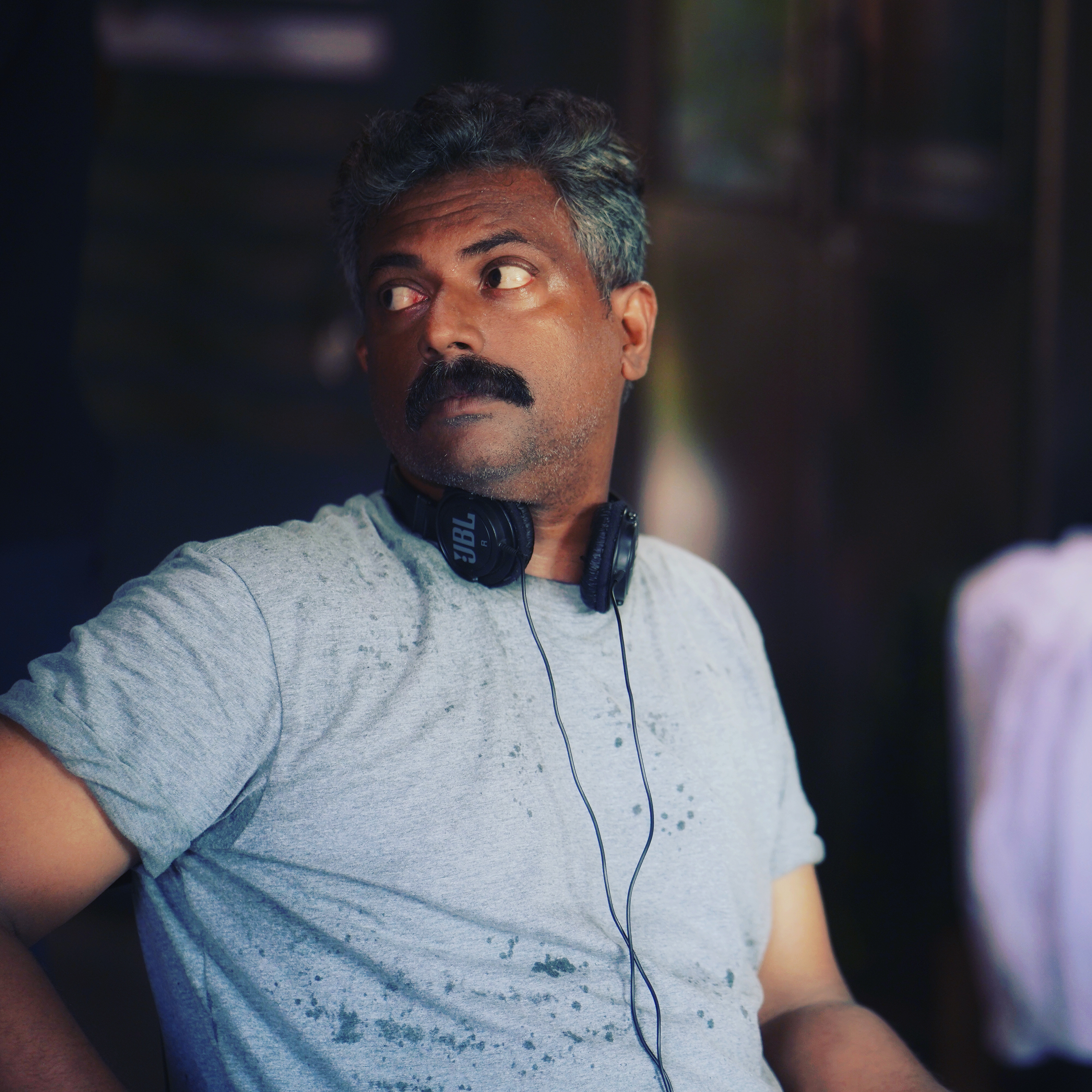
- Binu Pappu in 2019
- Born: Binu Padmadalakshan; Chennai, Tamil Nadu, India
- Occupations: Actor; assistant director
- Years active: 2014–present
- Spouse: Ashita Alex
- Parent: Kuthiravattam Pappu

Binu Padmadalakshan, known Professionally as Binu Pappu, is an Indian actor and assistant director who works in Malayalam films. He is known for his roles in films such as Helen, One, Operation Java and Bheemante Vazhi. In addition to acting, he has worked as an assistant director, assisting Aashiq Abu in his films Virus (2019) and Naradan (2019). He also worked in Khalid Rahman film Thallumaala (2022), in addition to working in other film such as Ambili (2019), Halal Love Story (2020), One (2021),Saudi Vellakka (2022) and Thudarum (2025).

== Early life ==
Binu Pappu was born in Chennai, Tamil Nadu. He is the son of veteran actor Kuthiravattam Pappu, who died in 2000. He pursued a Bachelor of Arts degree in History at the Zamorin's Guruvayurappan College, Kozhikode. He is married to Ashita Alex.

== Career ==
Before working in the film industry, he had worked as an animator in Bengalaru for 13 years. Binu made his acting debut in the film Gunda, directed by Salim Baba, where he was worked alongside Kalabhavan Mani and Tini Tom. He then worked with director Aashiq Abu in two of his films, Gangster (2014) and Rani Padmini (2015). His role as Joy Pulimoottil in the crime-thriller Operation Java (2021) was appreciated by critics.

In addition to working as an actor, he has assisted Aashiq Abu for his films Mayaanadhi, Virus (2019), Naradan (2022), and Thallumaala (2022), in addition to working as an assistant director in Ambili (2019), Halal Love Story (2020) and One (2021).

== Filmography ==
=== As actor ===
Key
†	Denotes films that have not yet been released

- All films are in Malayalam language unless otherwise noted.

Year	Title	Role	Notes
2014	Gunda	Christy	
2014	Gangster	Sourav	
2015	Rani Padmini	Kareem	
2016	Puthan Panam	Ajayan	
2017	Sakhavu	Prabhakaran Eeraali	
2018	Kala Viplavam Pranayam	Circle Inspector	
2018	Parole	Forest Officer	
2019	Lucifer	Jail Warden Mathew	
2019	Virus	Dr. Sudevan	
2019	Ambili	Ganapathy	
2019	Roudram 2018	Taxi Driver	
2019	Helen	Ravi Prakash	
2020	Halal Love Story	Abukka's Friend at tile factory	
2021	Operation Java	Joy Pulimoottil	
2021	Ice Orathi	Madhu	
2021	One	CM's Gunman Ashokan	
2021	Kachi	Criyac	
2021	Ennivar	Nishad	
2021	Kaanekkaane	C I Of Police	
2021	Bheemante Vazhi	Krishna Das	
2022	Salute	S.I. Pramod Peter	
2022	Thallumaala	Kalappurakkal David	Also playback singer
2022	Antakshari	Jayachandran	
2022	Solamante Theneechakal	Public Prosecutor Stephen Philip	
2022	Sundari Gardens	Dr.Mahi Mohan	
2022	Chattambi	Baby	
2022	Saudi Vellakka	Britto Vincent	Also associate director
2023	Jackson Bazaar Youth	SP George Simon IPS	
2023	Higuita	Raghu	
2023	Ayalvaashi	Benny	
2023	Kadina Kadoramee Andakadaham	Rashid	
2023	Nalla Nilavulla Rathri	Joshi	
2023	Journey of Love 18+	Rajesh	
2023	Kunjamminis Hospital	Fabi Manjooran	
2024	Hunt		
2024	Nunakkuzhi	Producer Sajan Chamakala	
2025	Bromance	SI Tony Francis	
2025	Abhilasham	Pachikka	
2025	Thudarum	SI Benny C. Kurian	
2025	Eko	Sukumaran	
2025	Pharma	Alex	JioHotstar web series
2026	Anomie	Shanmughan	
TBA	Musasi †	TBA	
TBA	Operation Cambodia †	TBA	

=== Other crew positions ===
Year	Title	Position	References
2016	Guppy	Assistant director	
2017	Mayanadi	Assistant director	
2019	Ambili	Assistant director	
2019	Virus	Assistant director	
2020	Halal Love Story	Assistant director	
2021	One	Associate director	
2022	Naaradan	Associate director	
2022	Thallumaala	Associate director	
2022	Puzhu	Associate director	
2022	Saudi Vellakka	Associate director	
2026	Torpedo †	Writer	
2027	Operation Cambodia †	Co-director	
