= Laughing Buddha (film) =

2024 Indian comedy drama film

- Theatrical release poster
- Directed by: M. Bharath Raj
- Screenplay by: M. Bharath Raj; Anirudh Mahesh; Akarsh H P
- Story by: M. Bharath Raj
- Produced by: Rishab Shetty
- Dialogues by: M. Bharath Raj; Anirudh Mahesh; Raghu Niduvalli
- Starring: Pramod Shetty; Teju Belawadi; Sundar Raj; Diganth
- Cinematography: S. Chandrasekaran
- Edited by: K. M. Prakash
- Music by: Vishnu Vijay
- Production company: Rishab Shetty Films
- Distributed by: KRG Studios
- Release date: 30 August 2024
- Running time: 136 minutes
- Country: India
- Language: Kannada

Laughing Buddha is a 2024 Indian Kannada-language comedy drama film written and directed by M. Bharath Raj. The film is produced by Rishab Shetty under Rishab Shetty Films banner. The film stars Pramod Shetty, Teju Belawadi, Sundar Raj, and Diganth. The cinematography was handled by S. Chandrasekaran, while the editing was done by K. M. Prakash and music by Vishnu Vijay in his Kannada Debut.

The film was released on 30 August 2024 to generally positive reviews from critics and audience alike.

== Plot ==
The film involves a soft-hearted cop who loves food, family and his profession—in that order—and the chaos that ensues when he is told that his weight could lead to his dismissal from his job. Can he reduce his weight in time to get back into the police force like he wishes to?

== Cast ==
- Pramod Shetty as Govardhan, a Police Constable
- Teju Belawadi as Sathyavathi, Govardhan's wife
- Sundar Raj as Sathyavathi's father
- Diganth as Vishwa
- SK Umesh as Senior Police Officer

== Production ==
=== Development ===
Laughing Buddha was produced by Rishab Shetty under his banner Rishab Shetty Films, marking his fourth production venture. M. Bharath Raj conceived the story with Pramod Shetty in mind for the lead role, after co-directing with Rishab Shetty on Sarkari Hi. Pra. Shaale, Kasaragodu, Koduge: Ramanna Rai. Bharath Raj narrated the story to Rishab, who was impressed and decided to produce the film. The project was officially announced on 31 August 2020, with the unveiling of the first look poster and title.

=== Filming ===
Principal photography was initially scheduled for October 2020 but was delayed due to the COVID-19 pandemic and scheduling conflicts with the cast. During this time, director M. Bharath Raj utilized the production delays to rewrite and improvise the script, further refining the story. Filming eventually resumed in March 2023 and concluded on 29 June 2023. Major portions were filmed in Bhadravati, Karnataka, with additional scenes shot in Bangalore and Kargal. The crew transformed an old building located in Bhadravati into a police station for the production.

=== Casting ===
Pramod Shetty underwent a substantial physical transformation, gaining thirty kilograms in weight, to prepare for his role. Teju Belawadi, known for her role in Gantumoote (2019), was cast as the female lead in this film. Rishab Shetty was initially considered for a pivotal role but, due to scheduling conflicts, Diganth was cast instead. Diganth's involvement in the film was officially announced in May 2023.

== Soundtrack ==
The soundtrack of the film was composed by Vishnu Vijay.

Laughing Buddha

Soundtrack album by Vishnu Vijay
- Released: 2024
- Genre: Feature film soundtrack
- Length: 7:12
- Language: Kannada
- Label: Rishab Shetty FIlms
- Producer: Vishnu Vijay

Vishnu Vijay chronology
Premalu (2024)	Laughing Buddha (2024)	Pravinkoodu Shappu (2025)

Track listing
No.	Title	Lyrics	Singer(s)	Length
1.	"Entha Chendane Ivalu"	K. Kalyan	Kapil Kapilan, Vishnu Vijay	3:40
2.	"Belagge Belagge"	Pramod Maravanthe	Vijay Prakash	3:32
Total length:				7:12

== Release ==
Laughing Buddha was initially announced to be released on 23 August 2024, but was rescheduled and released on 30 August 2024.

== Reception ==
The film generally received positive reviews with appreciation towards the story, direction and the acting of the entire cast.

Shashiprasad SM of Times Now rated the film three-and-a-half out of five stars and wrote, "Unlike most police stories which show them in bad light, this one focuses on the personal side with some good humour attached to it." Prathibha Joy of OTTplay gave it three out of five stars and wrote, "Bharath Raj M’s film is simple fun; there’s nothing ground-breaking about it and you’ll probably figure out where it’s headed miles before you get to the finish line. It’s a decent one-time watch with family, even though a couple of expletives are slipped in." Reviewing for Deccan Herald, Sujay B.M wrote "A gentle, humorous take on obesity in the police force and added the film is timely amid growing concerns about the lack of physical fitness amongst the police — largely attributed to overworking and a high-stress work environment."

Sunayana Suresh of The South First gave it three-and-a-half out of five stars and wrote, "Laughing Buddha is an ideal family film, blending laughter, romance, and drama in just the right amounts." Vivek M. V. of The Hindu wrote that "Laughing Buddha is more enjoyable for its empathetic take on the stressful lives of police officers than for its sub-plot involving a mysterious criminal". A critic from The Times of India gave it three-and-a-half out of five stars and wrote that "Despite a few minor flaws, Laughing Buddha is a worthwhile watch for a weekend." A Sharadhaa of Cinema Express rated the movie 3 out of 5 stars and wrote "Laughing Buddha is proof that it can and that even hefty topics can be approached with humour, keeping audiences entertained while reflecting on real-life challenges."
