= Muhsin Parari =

Indian film director

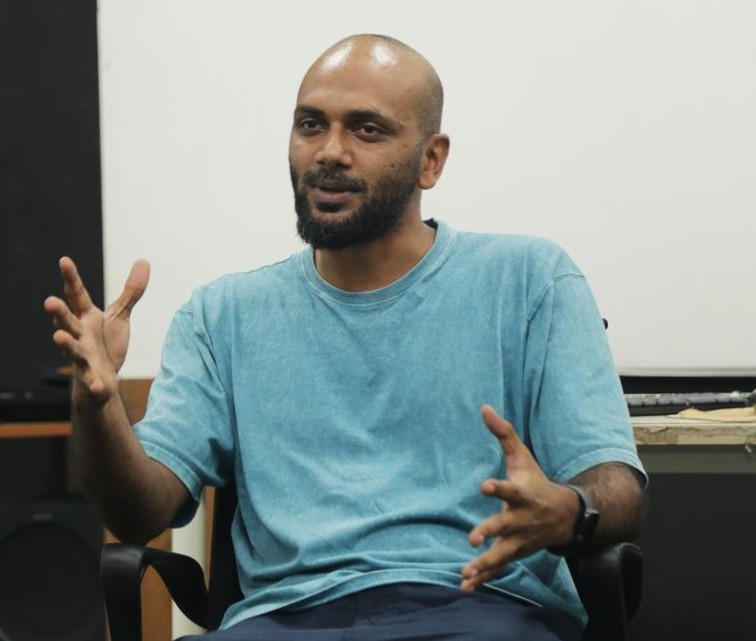
- Muhsin Parari
- Born: Muhsin Parari; 23 September 1988 (age 38); Edavanna, Kerala, India
- Other name: Mu.Ri
- Occupations: Film director; screenwriter; lyricist; film producer
- Years active: 2012–present
- Organisation: The Writing Company
- Spouse: Ameera Ibrahim
- Children: 2
- Awards: Kerala State Film Award for Best Screenplay

Muhsin Parari, known professionally as Mu.Ri, is an Indian film director, writer, producer and lyricist who works in Malayalam films.

== Career ==
He started his career by directing the music album Native Bapa (2012), in which actor Mamukkoya played the lead. He worked as assistant director in the feature films 5 Sundarikal (2013) and The Last Supper (2014). His first movie as a director was KL 10 Patthu (2015). In 2016, he returned with Funeral of a Native Son, a sequel to Native Bappa. Muhsin co-wrote the movie Sudani from Nigeria with director Zakariya Mohammed in 2018. The movie received five Kerala State Film Awards, including for Best Screenplay. His next release was Virus, directed by Aashiq Abu. The movie was set against the backdrop of the 2018 Nipah virus outbreak in Kerala. Muhsin co-wrote the screenplay with the duo Suhas-Sharfu. His 2020 release was Halal Love Story, second feature by Zakariya Mohammed after Sudani from Nigeria. Zakariya and Muhsin again joined to write the script and also credited as co-producers of the movie.

Muhsin is the writer and creative director of 2022 movie Thallumaala (dir:Khalid Rahman). The movie was announced in 2019 as his second directorial venture, but later in February 2020, Muhsin Parari announced that he would only do the script part, and Khalid Rahman would be the director. The movie was a big commercial success and turned out to be the ninth-highest grossing Malayalam film.

He is also a noted lyricist, and has penned songs in movies such as Thamaasha, Halal Love Story, Bheemante Vazhi, Thallumaala and Sulaikha Manzil.

== Filmography ==
=== Movies ===
Year	Title	Director	Notes	Ref.
2013	Dayom Panthrandum	Harshad PK	Dialogues only	
2015	KL 10 Patthu	Himself	Debut as director	
2018	Sudani from Nigeria	Zakariya Mohammed	Writer	
2019	Virus	Aashiq Abu	Writer	
2020	Halal Love Story	Zakariya Mohammed	Writer, producer	
2022	Thallumaala	Khalid Rahman	Writer and creative director	
2023	Ayalvaashi	Irshad Parari	Producer	
TBA	Gracias El Clasico	Himself	Writer, Producer	
TBA	Thantha Vibe	Himself	Starring Tovino Thomas	
TBA	Untitled Naslen K. Gafoor movie	Madhu C. Narayanan	Writer	

=== Other works ===
Year	Title	Role	Notes
2009	TerriKiddo	Director	Short film
2013	Native Bapa	Director	Malayalam hip-hop album
2016	Funeral of a Native Son	Director	Malayalam hip-hop album; sequel to Native Bappa
2020	KozhiPunk - Music video	Producer	
2022	03:00 AM - Music video	Producer and director	
2024	Panthal Chant - Music video	Producer and director	
2025	Nadupage - Music video	Producer	

=== Ad films ===
- Tales of love - Madhyamam Kudumbam
- Entri App

== As lyricist ==
Muhsin has earlier penned lyrics for Music Albums Native Bappa and Funeral of a Native Son, directed by himself. His film debut as a lyricist was through 2019 movie Thamaasha, directed by his friend Ashraf Hamza. Muhsin was asked to complete the lines of Paadi Njan, an incomplete Mappilappaattu written by Pulikkottil Hyder into a full-length song. He also wrote three other songs for Thamaasha. Later in the year he wrote Malayalam lines for Spread Love, a promotional track for the movie Virus along with English lyrics provided by Shelton Pinheiro. In 2020, he wrote Chayappaattu, an installment in Sithara Krishnakumar's Project Malabaricus and two songs for the movie Halal Love Story. He has won Best Lyricist award at 10th South Indian International Movie Awards for penning "Sundaranayavane" from Halal Love Story. In 2021, He joined again with Ashraf Hamza by penning all songs on Hamza's second film Bheemante Vazhi.

He wrote all the songs in 2022 movie Thallumaala, directed by Khalid Rahman and written by himself.

Muhsin often prefer a pen name "Mu. Ri" for songwriting credits. In 2024, he announced his debut music album "Muriginals" Vol. 1, featuring songs written by him and performed by artists including Shahabaz Aman, Sithara Krishnakumar, Vishnu Vijay, Govind Vasantha, Sekhar Menon, Arivu, Dabzee, M.H.R, Joker, Wraith V., Babyjean, 6091, Fathima Jahan, Indrans and Chemban Vinod Jose. The first song "Jilebi", featuring Sithara Krishnakumar and music produced by 6091 was released on 1 April 2024. The second song "Panthal Chant" featuring M.H.R, Wraith V., Dabzee, Babyjean and Joker was released on 8 September 2024.

In December 2024, Muhsin Parari announced that he will be stepping away from songwriting for the foreseeable future to focus on his directorial and screenwriting commitments.

=== Discography ===
Year	Song	Music director(s)	Film/album	Notes.
2013	"Native Bappa"	Roy George, Street Academics	Native Bappa	
2016	"Funeral of a Native Son"	Bijibal, Street Academics	Funeral of a Native Son	
2019	"Paadi njan"	Shahabaz Aman, Rex Vijayan	Thamaasha	
2019	"Kaanumbol ninne"	Rex Vijayan	Thamaasha	
2019	"Aham Brahmasmi"	Rex Vijayan	Thamaasha	
2019	"Masala Chaya"	Rex Vijayan	Thamaasha	
2019	"Spread love"	Sushin Shyam	Virus	
2020	"Chaayappaattu"	Sithara Krishnakumar	Project Malabaricus	
2020	"Sundaranayavane"	Shahabaz Aman, Rex Vijayan	Halal Love Story	
2020	"Bismillah"	Shahabaz Aman, Rex Vijayan	Halal Love Story	
2021	"Oruthi"	Vishnu Vijay	Bheemante Vazhi	
2021	"Bheemante Vazhippattu"	Vishnu Vijay	Bheemante Vazhi	
2021	"Pale Pole"	Vishnu Vijay	Bheemante Vazhi	
2022	"Kannil Pettole"	Vishnu Vijay	Thallumaala	
2022	"Ole Melody"	Vishnu Vijay	Thallumaala	
2022	"Thallumaala Paattu"	Vishnu Vijay	Thallumaala	
2022	"Ndaakkippattu"	Vishnu Vijay	Thallumaala	
2022	"Tupathu"	Vishnu Vijay	Thallumaala	
2022	"Thoottikkanoda Patha"	Vishnu Vijay	Thallumaala	
2022	"50 Cent"	Vishnu Vijay	Thallumaala	
2022	"Target Locked"	Vishnu Vijay	Thallumaala	
2022	"Wrath of Jemshi"	Vishnu Vijay	Thallumaala	
2022	"Kafkaesque"	Vishnu Vijay	Thallumaala	
2022	"Wedding Bells"	Vishnu Vijay	Thallumaala	
2022	"03:00 AM"	Sekhar Menon	03:00 AM	Featuring Salim Kumar
2023	"Puthuthayorith"	Jakes Bejoy	Iratta	
2023	"Chewing Gum"	Jakes Bejoy	Ayalvaashi	
2023	"Jil Jil Jil"	Vishnu Vijay	Sulaikha Manzil	
2023	"Haalaake Maarunne"	Vishnu Vijay	Sulaikha Manzil	
2023	"Premakkathu Pattu"	Govind Vasantha	Kadina Kadoramee Andakadaham	
2023	"Kotha Raja"	Jakes Bejoy	King of Kotha	
2023	"Manjeera Shinjitham"	Vishnu Vijay	Falimy	
2023	"Mazhavillile"	Vishnu Vijay	Falimy	
2023	"Karayaruthe"	Vishnu Vijay	Falimy	
2023	"Karunarasam"	Vishnu Vijay	Falimy	
2023	"Alaye"	Vishnu Vijay	Kasargold	
2024	"Viduthal"	Santhosh Narayanan	Anweshippin Kandethum	
2024	"Pennayippetta"	Gopi Sundar	Perumani	
2024	"Ya Wali Allah"	Gopi Sundar	Perumani	
2024	"Marannadu Pulle"	Vishnu Vijay	Pani	
2024	"Readya Maaran"	Jakes Bejoy	Hello Mummy	
2024	"Dhurooha Manthahasame" - Promo song	Christo Xavier	Sookshmadarshini	
2024	"Jilebi"	Sithara Krishnakumar	Muriginals vol.1	
2024	"Panthal Chant"	M.H.R, Wraith V., Dabzee, Babyjean, JOKER	Muriginals vol.1	
2025	"Nalla Rasam"	Sithara Krishnakumar	Muriginals vol.1	
2025	"Areela"	Sekhar Menon	Muriginals vol.1	Featuring Indrans
2025	"Nadupage"	Sithara Krishnakumar, Dabzee	Muriginals vol.1	
2025	"Shavathkuth"	Vishnu Vijay	Pravinkoodu Shappu	
2025	"Kedathe"	Vishnu Vijay	Pravinkoodu Shappu	
2025	"Cyclone Central	Jakes Bejoy	Identity	
2025	"Thani Lokah Murakkaari	Jakes Bejoy	Lokah Chapter 1: Chandra	

== Awards ==
Year	Award	Category	movie
2018	Kerala State Film Award	Best Screenplay	Sudani from Nigeria
2018	CPC Cine Awards	Best Screenplay	Sudani from Nigeria
2020	South Indian International Movie Awards	Best Lyricist	Halal Love Story
2022	South Indian International Movie Awards	Best Lyricist	Bheemante Vazhi
