= Sudani from Nigeria =

- Theatrical release poster
- Directed by: Zakariya Mohammed
- Written by: Zakariya Mohammed; Muhsin Parari
- Produced by: Sameer Thahir; Shyju Khalid
- Starring: Soubin Shahir; Samuel Abiola Robinson
- Cinematography: Shyju Khalid
- Edited by: Noufal Abdullah
- Music by: Score: Rex Vijayan; Yakzan-Neha; Kishan Mohan; Songs: Rex Vijayan; Shahabaz Aman
- Production company: Happy Hours Entertainments
- Distributed by: E4 Entertainment
- Release date: 23 March 2018
- Running time: 124 minutes
- Country: India
- Language: Malayalam
- Budget: ₹90 lakhs

Sudani from Nigeria is a 2018 Indian Malayalam-language sports drama film written and directed by Zakariya Mohammed, with dialogues co-written by Muhsin Parari. Shyju Khalid was the cinematographer, who also produced the film with Sameer Thahir. It stars Soubin Shahir, with Samuel Abiola Robinson as the titular character.

Sudani from Nigeria was released in India on 23 March 2018. It met with widespread critical acclaim and was a commercial success at the box office. The film won five awards at the 2018 Kerala State Film Awards, including Best Screenplay, Best Film with Popular Appeal and Aesthetic Value, Best Debut Director, Best Actor (Soubin), and Best Character Actress (Savithri and Sarasa). At the 2018 National Film Awards, it won the award for Best Feature Film in Malayalam and Savithri Sreedharan received a Special Mention for her performance in the film. It was included in The Hindu's top 25 Malayalam films of the decade.

== Plot ==
The movie is set in a rural town in Malappuram district in the state of Kerala. Majeed is an unmarried young football coach, who is the manager of a local team, named 'MYC Accode', which participates in Sevens football matches. He manages to recruit three talented Nigerian players to his team, who catapult the team's fame. Although successful in matches, Majeed, his friends and players are financially set back.

His team's star player Samuel "Sudu" Robinson is hospitalised following an accident and forced to rest for a month. Afraid he'll not be able to afford the hospital charges, Majeed decides to take Samuel to his home until he recovers. He and his mother are the only inhabitants of their home, with occasional visits from Majeed's stepfather who works as a security guard. Samuel becomes a spectacle for the townsfolk and many people visit the recovering "Sudani from Nigeria". Majeed and Samuel bond over time and share their personal life stories with each other.

Majeed hates and does not talk to his step-father due to emotional attachment with his late father. He also resents his mother for remarrying following the death of her husband, and refuses to talk to her unless absolutely necessary. Samuel, on the other hand, lost both his parents in the civil war and lived in a refugee camp with his grandmother and two sisters. Samuel only left in hope of being able to financially support his family. Trouble comes looking for them when an article in the newspaper, showing a recovering Samuel, Majeed, his friends and neighbours, attracts the attention of police officials who come asking for Samuel and his passport.

Samuel learns that his grandmother has died, and wants to immediately leave in order to be with his sisters. Chaos ensues when they discover his passport is missing, and Majeed and his friends looks for it everywhere, but in vain. Majeed decides to apply for a duplicate passport, prompting Samuel to reveal that his passport is fake. He was not able to legally acquire a passport due to being a refugee. The passport is eventually recovered and Majeed manages to buy a ticket for Samuel.

Samuel bids the town and Majeed an emotional farewell. Returning from the airport, Majeed decides to mend ties with his family. He meets his step-father and brings him back home to his mother's surprise and happiness.

== Cast ==
- Samuel Abiola Robinson as Samuel Abiola Robinson aka Sudu, a football player from Nigeria
- Soubin Shahir as Majeed, a young football coach
- Savithri Sreedharan as Jameela, Majeed's mother
- Sarasa Balussery as Beeyumma
- Aneesh G. Menon as Nizar
- K. T. C. Abdullah as Majeed's stepfather
- Lukman Avaran as Rajesh
- Abhiram Radhakrishnan as Kunjippa
- Navas Vallikkunnu as Latheef
- Sidheek Kodiyathur as Naserkka
- Ashraf Thangal as Bavakka
- Mashar Hamsa as Puthiyapla
- Ashraf Hamza as Doctor
- Najeeb Kuttippuram as Activist
- Hikmathulla as Journalist
- Unni Nair as Unni Nair
- Nasar Karutheni as Muthu Kaku
- Aroop as Shahid

== Production ==
The film was produced by cinematographers Sameer Thahir and Shyju Khalid and directed by debutant Zakariya. Soubin Shahir co-star along with Nigerian actor Samuel Abiola Robinson. With an idea to make an independent film, Zakariya Muhammed initially approached cinematographer-director Rajeev Ravi to find out if he could produce the film under his company Collective Phase One. Ravi suggested to make the film in a bigger scale and that Soubin would be apt for the role of Majeed. Ravi himself contacted Soubin for the film. Later, Muhsin Parari, who co-wrote the dialogues insisted Zakariya to approach Sameer, who agreed to produce the film with Khalid. Zakariya found Robinson through the internet.

The film is set in that backdrop of Sevens football matches held during November in the Malabar region of Kerala, but according to Zakariya, it is not a sports film, rather a "comic family drama". The film marks Robinson's debut foreign film. He plays Samuel, a Nigerian footballer brought to Kerala to play the All India Sevens Football match in Malappuram. Soubin plays his manager, Majeed. Despite Nigeria being popular for football, Robinson was not interested in the game, he said: "I belong to the 0.001 per cent population of my country that is not interested in football". He underwent training in Kerala. The film had a 35-day long shoot in Malappuram, few scenes were shot in Nigeria and Ghana.

== Music ==
The film features songs composed by Rex Vijayan and Shahabaz Aman. Aman wrote and composed the song "Kurrah" many years ago for a documentary. Rex re-arranged the song for the film.

Sudani from Nigeria

Soundtrack album by Rex Vijayan
- Released: April 6, 2018
- Genre: Feature film soundtrack
- Length: 27:40
- Label: Happy Hours Entertainments
- Producer: Rex Vijayan

Rex Vijayan chronology
| Mayaanadhi (2017) | Sudani from Nigeria (2018) | Thamaasha (2019) |

Sudani from Nigeria - Original motion picture soundtrack
| No. | Title | Lyrics | Music | Singer(s) | Length |
|---|---|---|---|---|---|
| 1. | "Kurrah" | Shahabaz Aman | Shahabaz Aman | Shahabaz Aman | 2:31 |
| 2. | "Cherukadhapole" | B. Harinarayanan | Rex Vijayan | Rex Vijayan, Imam Majboor | 3:54 |
| 3. | "Kinavu Kondu" | Anwar Ali | Rex Vijayan | Imam Majboor, Neha Nair | 4:18 |
| 4. | "Majeed-Intro (theme)" | | Rex Vijayan | | 0:55 |
| 5. | "Umma (theme)" | | Rex Vijayan | | 0:38 |
| 6. | "Beeyumma (theme)" | | Rex Vijayan | | 0:12 |
| 7. | "Sudu taken home" | | Rex Vijayan | | 0:43 |
| 8. | "Majeed (theme)" | | Rex Vijayan | | 0:26 |
| 9. | "Nair (theme)" | | Rex Vijayan | | 0:24 |
| 10. | "The visitors (theme)" | | Rex Vijayan | | 0:11 |
| 11. | "Father (theme)" | | Rex Vijayan | | 0:45 |
| 12. | "Take back Sudu to home (theme)" | | Rex Vijayan | | 0:32 |
| 13. | "Police station (theme)" | | Rex Vijayan | | 0:12 |
| 14. | "Beer for Sudu (theme)" | | Rex Vijayan | | 0:12 |
| 15. | "Better World (theme)" | | Rex Vijayan | | 0:25 |
| 16. | "Passport lost (theme)" | | Rex Vijayan | | 0:44 |
| 17. | "Grandma's death (theme)" | | Rex Vijayan | | 0:55 |
| 18. | "Sudu's story (theme)" | | Rex Vijayan | | 4:07 |
| 19. | "Sudu's arrest (theme)" | | Rex Vijayan | | 0:28 |
| 20. | "Police checking (theme)" | | Rex Vijayan | | 0:20 |
| 21. | "First aid box (theme)" | | Rex Vijayan | | 0:47 |
| 22. | "Sudu and Umma's part (theme)" | | Rex Vijayan | | 1:15 |
| 23. | "Farewell (theme)" | | Rex Vijayan | | 1:28 |
| 24. | "The End (theme)" | | Rex Vijayan | | 1:22 |

== Release ==
Sudani from Nigeria was released in India on 23 March 2018. The film dubbed in Telugu with same title and released on Aha

=== Critical response ===
The New Indian Express rated the film 4 out of 5 stars and wrote: "Very few stories cleanse your heart like Sudani from Nigeria. It is hard not to be swayed by the humanity here. Very few can leave the theatres without their eyes welled up. Sudani from Nigeria is one of the best movies made this year". Sify gave the verdict "heart-warming and honest" and added that "Sudani from Nigeria has been competently packaged and is a gripping tale. It's one of the finest movies that has come in Malayalam during recent times that steals your heart in a big way". Malayala Manorama awarded 3.5 in a scale of 5 and commented: "The 2-hour show is a delightful watch and viewers will have enough reasons to be awestruck as well as to laugh their hearts out". Rating 3.5 out of 5 stars, The Times of India wrote that "Sudani from Nigeria might not have big names to boast of but it's got everything in its right place, be it comedy, sentiments, thrills or tears". Movie Critic Veeyen rated the film 'Excellent' and stated that "Heartbreaking, hilarious and hopeful by turns, ‘Sudani from Nigeria’ is a glorious triumph whichever way you look at it, be it the exemplary performances, the proficient scripting or the competent direction". He added that "..Words would probably do little justice to this gem of a film, that should not, at any cost be missed in the theatres." Baradwaj Rangan of Film Companion South wrote "The film is a heart-warming celebration of humanity, but not in the overblown, vulgar, “triumph of the spirit” mode that Hollywood specialises in."

=== Box office ===
The film grossed ₹13.46 crore in less than a month from Kerala box office, with a distributor's share of 5.42 crore. It performed well at Indian domestic multiplexes (particularly in home state Kerala) and in gulf countries. Made at a budget of ₹90 lakhs, the film collected nearly ₹18 crore from Kerala alone with an estimated distributor's share of ₹6 – 6.5 crore. Sudani from Nigeria was the highest-grossing Malayalam film among the summer (March – May 2018) releases. It grossed $758,462 from the United Arab Emirates in three weekends.

== Accolades ==
| Award (Note: Awards, festivals and organizations are in alphabetical order.) | Date of ceremony (Note: Date is linked to the article about the awards held that year, wherever possible.) | Category | Recipient(s) | Result | Ref. |
|---|---|---|---|---|---|
| Aravindan Puraskaram | 15 March 2019 | Best Debut Director | Zakariya Mohammed | Won | |
| Asianet Film Awards | 6–7 April 2019 | Best Film | Sameer Thahir, Shyju Khalid | Won | |
| Asianet Film Awards | 6–7 April 2019 | Best Character Actor | Soubin Shahir | Nominated | |
| Asianet Film Awards | 6–7 April 2019 | Best Supporting Actor | Soubin Shahir | Nominated | |
| Asianet Film Awards | 6–7 April 2019 | Best Supporting Actress | Savithri Sreedharan | Won | |
| Asianet Film Awards | 6–7 April 2019 | Best Supporting Actress | Sarasa Balussery | Won | |
| Asiavision Awards | 16 February 2019 | Best Movie | Sudani from Nigeria – Happy Hours Entertainments | Won | |
| CPC Cine Awards | 17 February 2019 | Best Movie | Sameer Thahir, Shyju Khalid | Won | |
| CPC Cine Awards | 17 February 2019 | Best Script Writer | Zakariya Mohammed, Muhsin Parari | Won | |
| CPC Cine Awards | 17 February 2019 | Best Cinematographer | Shyju Khalid | Won | |
| CPC Cine Awards | 17 February 2019 | Best Editor | Noufal Abdullah | Won | |
| CPC Cine Awards | 17 February 2019 | Best Character Actress | Savithri Sreedharan | Won | |
| Filmfare Awards South | 21 December 2019 | Best Film – Malayalam | Sudani from Nigeria – Happy Hours Entertainments | Won | |
| Filmfare Awards South | 21 December 2019 | Best Director – Malayalam | Zakariya Mohammed | Nominated | |
| Filmfare Awards South | 21 December 2019 | Best Actor – Malayalam | Soubin Shahir | Nominated | |
| Filmfare Awards South | 21 December 2019 | Critics Best Actor – Malayalam | Soubin Shahir | Won | |
| Filmfare Awards South | 21 December 2019 | Best Supporting Actress – Malayalam | Savithri Sreedharan | Won | |
| Filmfare Awards South | 21 December 2019 | Best Supporting Actress – Malayalam | Sarasa Balussery | Nominated | |
| International Film Festival of Kerala | 7–13 December 2018 | FIPRESCI Award: Best Malayalam Film | Sudani from Nigeria – Zakariya Mohammed | Won | |
| Kerala State Film Awards | 27 July 2019 | Best Film with Popular Appeal and Aesthetic Value | Producers: Sameer Thahir, Shyju Khalid; Director: Zakariya Mohammed | Won | |
| Kerala State Film Awards | 27 July 2019 | Best Debut Director | Zakariya Mohammed | Won | |
| Kerala State Film Awards | 27 July 2019 | Best Screenplay | Zakariya Mohammed, Muhsin Parari | Won | |
| Kerala State Film Awards | 27 July 2019 | Best Actor | Soubin Shahir | Won | |
| Kerala State Film Awards | 27 July 2019 | Best Character Actress | Savithri Sreedharan | Won | |
| Kerala State Film Awards | 27 July 2019 | Best Character Actress | Sarasa Balussery | Won | |
| Mohan Raghavan Award | 2018 | Best Director | Zakariya Mohammed | Won | |
| National Film Awards | 23 December 2019 | Best Feature Film in Malayalam | Producers: Sameer Thahir, Shyju Khalid; Director: Zakariya Mohammed | Won | |
| National Film Awards | 23 December 2019 | Special Mention | Savithri Sreedharan | Won | |
| Padmarajan Award | 25 May 2019 | Best Film | Zakariya Mohammed | Won | |
| South Indian International Movie Awards | 15–16 August 2019 | Best Film – Malayalam | Sudani from Nigeria – Happy Hours Entertainments | Won | |
| South Indian International Movie Awards | 15–16 August 2019 | Best Director – Malayalam | Zakariya Mohammed | Nominated | |
| South Indian International Movie Awards | 15–16 August 2019 | Best Debut Director – Malayalam | Zakariya Mohammed | Won | |
| South Indian International Movie Awards | 15–16 August 2019 | Best Cinematographer – Malayalam | Shyju Khalid | Nominated | |
| South Indian International Movie Awards | 15–16 August 2019 | Best Supporting Actor – Malayalam | K. T. C. Abdullah | Nominated | |
| South Indian International Movie Awards | 15–16 August 2019 | Best Supporting Actress – Malayalam | Savithri Sreedharan | Nominated | |
| South Indian International Movie Awards | 15–16 August 2019 | Best Comedian – Malayalam | Navas Vallikkunnu | Nominated | |
| South Indian International Movie Awards | 15–16 August 2019 | Best Music Director – Malayalam | Rex Vijayan | Nominated | |
| South Indian International Movie Awards | 15–16 August 2019 | Best Male Playback Singer – Malayalam | Shahabaz Aman – ("Kurrah") | Nominated | |
| Vanitha Film Awards | 2 March 2019 | Best Debut Director | Zakariya Mohammed | Won | |
| Vanitha Film Awards | 2 March 2019 | Best Cinematographer | Shyju Khalid | Won | |

== Controversies ==
After the release of the film, actor Samuel Abiola Robinson alleged the producers that he was underpaid because of racism. He added that more money is promised if the movie become success, but no additional payment was given, despite the film being a success. Producers responded that the film was a low budget one and they will give more money once box office collections are finalized. They also added that racial allegations were unfortunate. Later Samuel informed that all issues were solved and racial discrimination allegations were all a misunderstanding.
