= Thallumaala =

2022 film directed by Khalid Rahman

- Theatrical release poster
- Directed by: Khalid Rahman
- Written by: Muhsin Parari; Ashraf Hamza
- Produced by: Ashiq Usman
- Starring: Tovino Thomas; Kalyani Priyadarshan; Shine Tom Chacko; Lukman Avaran
- Cinematography: Jimshi Khalid
- Edited by: Nishadh Yusuf
- Music by: Vishnu Vijay
- Production companies: Ashiq Usman Productions; Plan B Motion Pictures
- Distributed by: Central Pictures
- Release date: 12 August 2022
- Running time: 147 minutes
- Country: India
- Language: Malayalam
- Box office: ₹50 crore

Thallumaala (transl. Ballad of Brawls) is a 2022 Indian Malayalam-language action comedy film directed by Khalid Rahman, produced by Ashiq Usman and written by Muhsin Parari and Ashraf Hamza. The film stars Tovino Thomas, Kalyani Priyadarshan, Shine Tom Chacko and Lukman Avaran.

Principal photography commenced in October 2021. The music was composed by Vishnu Vijay, with the editing and cinematography by Nishadh Yusuf and Jimshi Khalid respectively.

Thallumaala was theatrically released on 12 August 2022. It grossed ₹50 crore worldwide, emerging as the highest grosser in Tovino Thomas' career until it was surpassed by his survival thriller 2018.

== Plot ==
Wazim meets his friends - Jamshi, Vikas and Rajesh. The friendship between Jamshi and Wazim happened due to a fight in a mosque after Wazim stepped on Jamshi's shoes. Later, Wazim, Jamshi and Wazim's old friend Sathar leave for a football match, which gets interrupted by a fight between Vikas and Rajesh. Wazim, Jamshi and Sathar join the fight and the friendship circle expands.

Wazim meets Fathima Beepaathu Beevi, a vlogger, at a theatre owned by his father Abdullah, where they become friends. Beepathu invites Wazim for a shop inauguration, but he is unable to make it due to the fight with Jamshi, Vikas and Rajesh. Later, the friends meet Omega Babu, an arrogant goon, to settle an old score for Jamshi, but they could not make it as Wazim slaps Beepathu's cousin brother Siyad with whom Wazim has another score to settle. Later, Sathar brings Beepathu to Wazim's theatre to watch Vikram Vedha, but Siyad and his gang intervene, where another fight erupts, leading to the theatre's destruction and Abdullah sending Wazim to Dubai.

Two years later, Wazim returns home and meets Beepathu. The duo fall in love and decide to get married. One day, Wazim's friends get involved in a fight with SI Reji and his gang that leaves Wazim's friends in a state of injury and humiliation. Reji tries to patch up things, but a fight breaks out during Wazim's wedding. The wedding gets called off and Wazim becomes an infamous internet celebrity called Manavaalan. Wazim is sent back to Dubai again.

Six months later, Wazim returns home and learns that Beepathu is getting engaged to another person. Reji meets Wazim to settle the score of the wedding fight. A fight ensues where Reji defeats Wazim. Reji, who is finally at peace, decides to reunite Wazim and Beepathu. They leave for Dubai to meet Beepathu and prevent her engagement. When they arrive at the marriage venue to meet Beepathu, Omega Babu arrives and another fight erupts between Wazim's gang and Omega Babu to settle Jamshi's old score. Beepathu, who witnesses the fight, manages to slip away from the venue. After settling the score, Wazim runs behind Beepathu, lovingly asking her to stop.

== Cast ==
- Tovino Thomas as Wazim a.k.a Manavaalan Wazim, a famous influencer
- Kalyani Priyadarshan as Fathima Beevi a.k.a Beepaathu, a vlogger
- Shine Tom Chacko as S. I. Reji Mathew
- Lukman Avaran as Jamshi
- Swathi Das Prabhu as Sathaar
- Adhri Joe as Vikas
- Austin Dan as Rajesh
- Binu Pappu as Kalapurakkal David
- Gokulan as Rajan
- Johny Antony as Abdullah, Wazim's father
- Chemban Vinod Jose as Omega Babu
- Neena Kurup as Wazim's mother
- Assim Jamal as Abid, Beepathu's brother
- Shafi Kollam as Shafi, Wazim's brother-in-law
- Noushad Ali as Siyad, Beepathu's cousin
- Bhanumathi Payyannur as Jamshi's mother
- James Elia as J. P. Kodoor
- Dr. Satheesh Kumar as Cheriyan
- Dhaneesh K. Balan as Dhaneesh
- Sanu Salim as Biju
- Mashar Hamsa as Nahas, Beepathu's cousin
- Ann Salim as Beepathu's cousin
- Naslin Salim as Beepathu's cousin
- Unni Raja as theatre projector operator
- V. P. Khalid as Christian Priest
- Tia Rohin Sebastian as Sumayya, Wazim's sister
- Tanvi Ram as Tressa, Reji's wife
- Assil as Nihal, Wazim's Nephew
- Mohammed Eravattoor as theatre watchman
- Anand Bal as textile shop manager
- Balan Parakkal as building partner
- Babu Annur as building partner
- Gulam Ali as building partner
- Jaleel as Muslim Priest (Voice by Nasar Karutheni)
- Salim Kumar as singer (cameo)
- Vishnu Vijay (cameo)

== Production ==
"We haven't made this film from a storyline. We focused on entertainment aspects of cinema like action, music etc., and made a story to fit in these elements properly. For this, We needed a confident director and venturesome producer. There comes Khalid Rahman and Ashiq Usman."

— Muhsin Parari.

In an interview, Muhsin Parari stated: "After the box-office bomb of KL 10 Patthu, I wanted to make a film that meets what I couldn't pull off in KL 10 Patthu. I signed up with Sameer Thahir and Ashraf Hamza for my next directorial. I discussed with Ashraf Hamza that my drive is to make a film in same flavour as of KL 10 Patthu but one that attract people to theatres. Suddenly the name 'thallumaala' popped up in my brain from nowhere, and we decided to make it as a chain of fights that presented in a musical way."

Thallumaala was announced in October 2019 with Aashiq Abu and Rima Kallingal as the producers. Sushin Shyam would do the music, and Tovino Thomas and Soubin Shahir were announced as the lead actors at that time. Later in February 2020, Muhsin Parari announced that he would do the script part only, and Khalid Rahman would be the film director. Ashiq Usman replaced Aashiq Abu and Rima Kallingal as the producer.

Soubin Shahir also dropped out of the project and Shine Tom Chacko came as the replacement in February 2020. It was reported that Rex Vijayan and Shahabaz Aman would join as music directors with Sushin Shyam working only on the background score. In February 2021, it has been reported that Kalyani Priyadarshan is cast as the heroine of the film. Principal photography of the film commenced with a pooja function on 12 October 2021. It was confirmed that Vishnu Vijay will handle music and background score.

== Music ==
Thallumaala

Soundtrack album by Vishnu Vijay
- Released: 16 August 2022
- Recorded: 2021–2022
- Studios: 2 Bar Q Studios, Chennai
- Genre: Film soundtrack
- Length: 24:20
- Languages: Malayalam, English
- Label: Muzik 247
- Producer: Vishnu Vijay

Vishnu Vijay chronology
Makal (2022)	Thallumaala (2022)	Sulaikha Manzil (2023)
External audio
- Original Motion Picture Soundtrack, from Spotify

Singles from Thallumaala
- 1. "Manasakamil - Manavalan Unleashed " Released: January 10, 2023

=== Development ===
"It is innovation that is the driving force of the movie, not the subject or the story. For me, the rebellion of turning my native dialect, culture and beliefs, which at one time used to be considered 'uncivilised' and made me feel less-than, into the stylish aesthetics of a movie was the challenge I wanted to take on...The fun the word conveys - chain of fights and maala paattu (Muslim ballads) - inspired me to think about and develop it as a movie, and place it in pop culture with a literary quality. Even when I originally thought about the concept, it came in a musical, poetic package. "

— Muhsin Parari, on developing of Thallumaala soundtrack

Vishnu Vijay got involved in the project while he was working on the 2021 film Bheemante Vazhi, directed by Ashraf Hamza, who co-wrote the screenplay of Thallumaala with Muhsin Parari. Bheemante Vazhi also featured songs written by Muhsin Parari. "The two projects went in parallel with same people on board, At a time we had a confusion which film we were working." - said Vishnu Vijay.

In an interview with Club FM, Muhsin Parari stated that: "Both me and Vishnu Vijay likes wordplay or pun, we used a lot of puns in the movie. What lacks in Thallumaala soundtrack is melody, and we used to tell melody is the only 'Adi' (transl. blow) missing here. The idea of the track 'Ole melody' (transl. Her melody) evolved straight from this thought. Among all those fights he had, the most impactful blow he ever received was her melody. We composed this thought and included some Qawwali elements to make the song." In another interview Muhsin said that the music notes "SaMa GaMa SaMa GaRiMa" from the song can also be read literally, which cites a meaning "Equal Dignity, Equal Pride". About Thallumaala paattu, Muhsin said: "from the time we conceived the idea of the movie, I was certain about this track. All the lead male characters should be introduced through this one. But I haven't decided to write the song myself as I was supposed to be the director of the movie that time, and I wasn't confident enough to do all the jobs by myself. When Khalid Rahman replaced me as director, he insisted me to write this song. The name "thallumaala" comes from the folk term "maala" (transl. ballad). This is a ballad of fights, and I took it literally to write this song."

In addition to his acting role, Tovino Thomas sang the track "Tupathu", an offbeat Rap song with Shakthisree Gopalan. The track "Kannil Pettole" is a peppy number with Arabic and Hip hop elements. Irfana Hameed, a popular hip hop musician from Kodaikanal, who penned and rapped the English verses. "Ndakkippattu" is a dance number in which the vocal department consists mostly of the actors who appear on the song. K. D. Vincent acted as the music coordinator of the project. Songs and score were recorded at 2 bar Q Studios, Chennai.

=== Soundtrack ===
The soundtrack accompanied for the film received great attention and has eight songs in number. The Malayalam lyrics were penned by Muhsin Parari while the English rap verses featured in the song "Kannil pettole" was penned by Irfana Hameed, a popular hip-hop musician from Kodaikanal. Vijay, Benny Dayal, Haricharan, Shakthisree Gopalan, Irfana Hameed, Hrithik Jayakish, Neha Girish, Eshaan Sanil, Thejas Krishna, Shenbagaraj, Santhosh Hariharan, Sreeraj as well as Salim Kumar, Tovino Thomas, Khalid Rahman, Binu Pappu, Gokulan, Lukman Avaran and Muhsin Parari gave vocals for the tracks featured in the album.

The soundtrack is influenced by traditional Muslim musical styles of Northern Kerala and consisted of various genres and moods being incorporated. It was released on 16 August 2022 by Muzik 247. The album also features a promotional song titled "Manavalan Thug" written and performed by Dabzee and SA, composed by Dabzee, which was not included in the film but was listed in the original soundtrack album.

The soundtrack album received mixed-to-positive feedback from music listeners and critics, appreciating Vishnu Vijay for his compositions and Muhsin Parari for the catchy and fresh lyrics. It was positioned No:10 in "Global Debutant" chart on Spotify over the weekend August 19 to 21, 2022.

An additional track titled Manasakamil - Manavalan Unleashed was released by Muzik 247 on 10 January 2023.

=== Track listing ===
Thallumaala
No.	Title	Lyrics	Music	Singer(s)	Length
1.	"Kannil Pettole"	Muhsin Parari, Irfana Hameed	Vishnu Vijay	Vishnu Vijay, Irfana Hameed	02:55
2.	"Ole Melody"	Muhsin Parari	Vishnu Vijay	Benny Dayal, Haricharan, Salim Kumar, Vishnu Vijay	04:02
3.	"Thallumaala Paattu"	Muhsin Parari	Vishnu Vijay/ Traditional	Hrithik Jayakish, Neha Girish, Eshaan Sanil, Thejas Krishna, Vishnu Vijay	03:03
4.	"Ndaakkippaattu"	Muhsin Parari	Vishnu Vijay	Vishnu Vijay, Muhsin Parari, Shenbagaraj, Santhosh Hariharan, Sreeraj, Swathi Das, Austin Dan, Lukman Avaran, Adri Joe, Gokulan, Binu Pappu	02:39
5.	"Manavalan Thug"	Dabzee & SA	Dabzee	Dabzee & SA	03:20
6.	"Tupathu"	Muhsin Parari	Vishnu Vijay	Tovino Thomas, Vishnu Vijay, Shakthisree Gopalan	03:55
7.	"Grudge Song"	-	Vishnu Vijay	Vishnu Vijay	02:39
8.	"Thoottikkanoda Patha"	Muhsin Parari	Vishnu Vijay	Khalid Rahman, Vishnu Vijay	01:45
Total length:					24:20

Additional track
No.	Title	Lyrics	Music	Singer(s)	Length
1.	"Manasakamil - Manavalan Unleashed"	Bappu Velliparamba	Vishnu Vijay	Meera Prakash, Sinduri, Gayathry Rajiv, Vishnu Vijay	06:32

=== Original soundtrack ===
An original soundtrack album composed and produced by Vishnu Vijay was released on 4 October 2022.

Thallumaala

Film score by Vishnu Vijay
- Released: 4 October 2022
- Recorded: 2022
- Studios: 2 Bar Q Studios, Chennai
- Genre: Film Score
- Length: 45:15
- Languages: Malayalam, English
- Label: Muzik 247
- Producer: Vishnu Vijay
External audio
- Original Soundtrack on YouTube
- Original Soundtrack from Spotify

Thallumaala (Original Soundtrack)
No.	Title	Lyrics	Length
1.	"The Sneaker War"		00:34
2.	"Ghee Rice Truce"		00:33
3.	"Lola Lola Evolution"		00:38
4.	"The Thallumaala Junction"		01:13
5.	"The Chief Guest Is Here"		01:52
6.	"The Round Track Transition"		02:26
7.	"Bicycle Riders"		01:01
8.	"The Cycle Chase"		01:22
9.	"50 Cent"	Muhsin Parari	00:41
10.	"Target Locked"	Muhsin Parari	00:17
11.	"Paid Partnership"		00:39
12.	"Aww Ntedaa!!"		01:09
13.	"Enroute Kismat Via Mohabbat"		01:06
14.	"Sidratul Muntaha!"		00:32
15.	"Don't Touch My Hairstyle"		01:25
16.	"Omega Babu Has Arrived!"		01:04
17.	"Wrath Of Jemshi"	Muhsin Parari	02:14
18.	"Screen On Fire"		04:04
19.	"Kafkaesque"	Muhsin Parari	00:54
20.	"The Call For Duel"		01:29
21.	"Man Of The Night"		01:17
22.	"The Thallumaala Junction 2"		01:19
23.	"The Post Traumatic Growth"		02:21
24.	"Third Rule Of Fight Club"		00:53
25.	"Save My Number"		00:45
26.	"The Gossip Session"		01:00
27.	"Respect Your Parents"		00:49
28.	"Equal Pride! Equal Dignity!"		01:55
29.	"Fourth Rule Of Fight Club"		00:54
30.	"The Vocal War"		02:28
31.	"Wedding Bells"	Muhsin Parari	00:21
32.	"Fasten Your Seat Belt"		02:59
33.	"Kantoora Gang"		00:35

=== Promotional track ===
"Manavaalan Thug"

Single by DABZEE

from the album Thallumaala (soundtrack)
- Language: Malayalam, English
- Released: 10 August 2022
- Studio: Mixlabs Studios, Bangalore
- Genre: Folk, Hip-hop
- Length: 3:20
- Label: Muzik 247
- Composer: DABZEE
- Lyricists: DABZEE & SA
- Producer: MHR

DABZEE singles chronology
"Bharavase" (2022)	"Manavaalan Thug" (2022)	"Vecho Foot" (2022)
External audio
- Manavaalan Thug from Spotify
- Manavaalan Thug on YouTube

A promotional song titled "Manavaalan Thug" composed by Dabzee, written and performed by Dabzee & SA, members of Malayalam Hip hop band 'Manushyar', was released on Muzik 247's YouTube channel on 10 August 2022. The song was written in native Malabar slang with English rap verses.

In an interview with Manorama, Dabzee stated about the track: "The (thallumaala) team listens to this song after the film's censoring and so on. This track was done in about ten days...I wrote four lines of the song first. This was one of many independent tracks to be constructed by us. One of the Thallumala team happened to hear it. Later Khalid Rahman and Muhsin Parari were calling me. Perhaps the first recorded Malabari slang and swag connected them." A Nike shoes reference in the lines "Suggundaymoru Seriyundu" (transl. "with shoes, has a tickmark on it") was pointed out by many listeners. But Dabzee said:

"Everyone thinks it is a Nike brand reference. But as a writer, I saw a different meaning to it. Regardless of gender, there are those who object to wearing a costume of their choice. But what one wants to wear is one's choice and one's freedom. It means that there is truth in it."

The track received highly positive reviews and went on to become a sensational hit across various social media platforms.

=== Reception ===
The soundtrack album received positive reviews from both critics and audience. Nirmal Jovial of The Week wrote: "Thallumaala is a success as a great musical also. Songs are effectively used at various junctures in the plot. Muhsin Parari does pure magic with his lyrics, especially in the songs 'Ole Melody' and 'Ndaakkippattu'. Vishnu Vijays's music is so fresh and energetic." Behindwoods wrote that "For the new Gen music lovers, Thallumaala will be a treat. The film is peppered with impromptu situational songs with beats as popping as the frames of the music video and lyrics that are conversational and hilarious." A critique from Music Aloud stated that "Thallumaala's music is radically different from anything that Vishnu Vijay has produced in Malayalam movies thus far, and it is great to see him absolutely nail it in a new territory. He has some solid support from Muhsin Parari, of course. And a hat tip to Dabzee and SA as well, for their outstanding guest composition." The song "Thallumaala paattu" positioned No:4 on Top Viral 50 Global Charts of Spotify, on 21 August 2022. The soundtrack album was positioned No:10 in "Global Debutant" chart on Spotify over the weekend August 19 to 21.

=== Music video ===
The first song from the film "Kannil pettole", featuring Tovino Thomas and Kalyani Priyadarshan was released on 3 May 2022. The video garnered attention for its vibrant and colourful picturisation and also noted for a dancing Tovino Thomas, probably the first time in his career.

The lyric video of "Ole melody" was released on 4 July 2022, and the music video was released on 19 August 2022. The video song featured actor Salim Kumar in a special appearance, who also had a vocal contribution in the song.

The lyric video of "Thallumaala paattu" was released on 24 July 2022. The video featured some clips of the action sequences from the film got instant attention and went viral on the internet.

The song video of "Ndaakkippaattu" was released on 1 August 2022. The video featured dance performances by Tovino Thomas, Shine Tom Chacko, Binu Pappu, Gokulan, Lukman Avaran, Adri Joe, Austin Dan and Swathi Das Prabhu. It was choreographed by Shobi Paulraj and the video was received well by the viewers.

The song video of a rap song "Tupathu", featuring Tovino Thomas and Kalyani Priyadarshan was released after the film completed 4 days run in theatre. Even though the song's placement in the film received mixed responses, the video alone was well received.

The first composed, but never recorded version of Ndaakkippaattu was used in the 'night-before-wedding' scene in the movie. The unreleased song titled as Ole Kolaayi differ considerably from the recorded version. The song was clubbed together with a stanza of Chakkara Chundil (a music single by singer Shafi Kollam, who also got an acting part in the scene) and picturised. The scene was conceived as two rival gangs singing and celebrating together, while a great tension evolves between them. This sequence was released as a music video titled "Chakkara Chundil" on Muzik 247's YouTube channel, on 22 August 2022.

The music video of the promotional track "Manavalan Thug" was released on 10 August 2022. The video was directed by Suhail Backer and featured Tovino Thomas and singers Dabzee and SA. Along with the soundtrack, The music video of Manavalan Thug also went viral and gained more than 100 million views on YouTube.

== Marketing ==
In August 2022, a trailer show was held on the outer wall of Dubai Festival City Mall. The film's title was written using laser technology on the water fountain. This was the first time that a Malayalam film is drawing a picture in water as part of its promotion. On August 10, The cast were supposed to visit the HiLITE Mall in Kozhikode for the promotion of the movie. However, crowd had turned out in huge numbers at the venue, which made the makers cancel the promotional event.

A promotional song "Manavaalan Thug" composed and performed by Dabzee & SA was released on Muzik 247's YouTube channel on 10 Aug 2022.

== Release ==
Thallumaala was released worldwide on 12 August 2022.

=== Home media ===
The satellite and digital rights were sold to Surya TV and Netflix respectively. The film began streaming on Netflix on 11 September 2022.

== Reception ==
=== Box office ===
The film was a commercial success and turned out to be the highest grossing Tovino Thomas film. In the opening day, the film grossed ₹7.4 crore and ₹15 crore from the first and second day worldwide. On its fourth day, the film grossed ₹31 crore at the box office overtaking the lifetime collections of Tovino's other three ventures of 2022, Vaashi, Dear Friend and Naaradan within its opening day. The film is estimated to have collected ₹50 crore.

=== Critical response ===
Thallumaala received mixed reviews from critics.

Nirmal Jovial of The Week gave 4/5 stars and said, "With a strong script—complemented by a strong flavour of Malabar—it delivers what it promises in its title and more. Thallumaala is a film with a nonlinear narrative structure with the plot divided into different chapters. Rahman uses this narrative structure to give the audience a parallel view of the present and the past of the protagonist. This also ensures no drop in the film's energy in either of the halves. The script by Ashraf Hamza and Muhsin Parari is top-notch." Cris of The News Minute gave 3.5/5 stars and wrote "Thallumala, obviously, is not everyone’s cup of tea. It is experimental with a capital E. You can either enjoy it, or understand that this is something appreciable and just not your kind of thing. But if you are the curious kind, you’d want to know just what the H this is all about."

Jayadeep Jayesh of Deccan Herald gave 3.5/5 stars and wrote "‘Thallumaala’ can be appreciated for humanising the people of Mallapuram who are often vilified or caricatured in Malayalam cinema. The glorification of violence could offend some people. But the intentionally stylised filmmaking constantly reminds us that we are watching a make-belief world, and hence the film is definitely worth a watch." Sanjith Sidhardhan of OTTplay gave 3.5/5 stars and wrote "While Malayalam cinema has often been hailed for its realistic films, Tovino Thomas and Khalid Rahman’s Thallumaala could be a trendsetter, marrying both quality and entertainment with a craft that is on par with international standards."

Manoj Kumar. R of The Indian Express gave 3/5 stars and wrote "Khalid Rahman has stylishly staged the fights. But, underneath all the madness, there is a commentary too -- strong men can control their anger, weak men can't." Behindwoods gave 3/5 stars and wrote "Thallumaala is a through-and-through action entertainer with its share of humour, catchy tunes, adept stunt choreography, and decent performances. Expect the style quotient to hit the roof in this movie as you see Kalyani’s Fathima and most of the other characters sport trendy and high-end clothes. With enough action sequences to enjoy with your popcorn as Fathima does in the movie, Thallumaala is a good choice for an entertaining time at theatres." Anna M. M. Vetticad of Firstpost gave 2.5/5 stars and wrote "Tovino Thomas is loveable, but Thallumaala’s lively soundtrack and visual gimmicks conspire to generate a sensory overload that camouflages a thin-as-a-pappadum story and emotional emptiness."

Princy Alexander of Onmanorama reviewed the movie as "A fun ride anchoring on new gen vibe" and said, "Thallumala is more of a jovial experiment in terms of technique and narrative. The use of technology and graphics resonates well with the youth who can also relate to the characters because of their spontaneity and their lack of fear of consequences." S.R. Praveen of The Hindu gave praise for its action sequences and technical craft, but mentioned the lack of substance in the narrative and the same craftily hidden with non-linear style and the relentless fight-song-fight routine that would render one without a breathing space to think.

== Awards ==
Year	Award	Category	Winner	Notes
2022	Kerala State Film Awards	Best Editor	Nishad Yusuf	
2022	Kerala State Film Awards	Best Choreography	Shobi Paulraj	
2022	Mazhavil Manorama Music Awards	Best Experimental Music	Vishnu Vijay	

== Controversies ==
=== Manhandling Incident ===
On 7 March 2022, two people have admitted to a hospital claiming Shine Tom Chacko manhandled them during the filming of the movie. The incident happened when the local people of Kalamassery HMT colony questioned the crew of the film regarding dumping waste while filming. Later the police intervened and set end to things.

=== Editing of subtitles by Netflix ===
On 12 September 2022, a day after the film's streaming release, the subtitling company Fill in the Blanks through their social media handles expressed their dissatisfaction of Netflix editing their English subtitles for the film which were already approved by the film's writer. Upon the incident, several subtitle artists from various countries shared similar experiences they faced in the past, and showed solidarity to the company. Netflix is yet to respond on this.

=== Censoring by Netflix ===
After the movie began streaming on Netflix, It has been reported that the word "beef" was completely cut from the Kannada version of Thallumaala. The word "beef" enters into the dialogues in many parts of the movie. However, "beef" was completely removed from the dialogue and subtitles in Kannada version, "mutton" and "curry" were used instead. Audience and critics have come forward on social media against Netflix, saying Netflix has a history of censoring "beef" from movies and the like. Some critics even pointed out that Netflix is doing "such degrading work" out of fear of cow vigilante organisations, working with the support of the then Karnataka Government.

=== Accusation by Animation Team ===
On 11 September 2022, The film's animation team Studio Kokaachi accused the makers of the film for repeatedly not crediting them in titles. After Thallumaala dropped on Netflix, the animation team said that "powers-that-be had refused to acknowledge their contribution and share the names of the artistes who had worked on the film's animated scenes, which were wide praised by the audience and to an extent gave the film its unique style". The makers of the movie then apologised "for missing" their names on the title credits, explaining "it was an honest mistake from our side". Kokaachi, however, stated that they first spotted the error when the movie had released in theatres and they found out that their names were missing from the end credits, the makers had "ample time and opportunity to correct the mistake".
