= Bheemante Vazhi =

2021 film by Ashraf Hamza

- Theatrical release date poster
- Directed by: Ashraf Hamza
- Written by: Chemban Vinod Jose
- Produced by: Chemban Vinod Jose; Rima Kallingal; Aashiq Abu
- Starring: Kunchacko Boban; Chemban Vinod Jose; Jinu Joseph; Megha Thomas
- Cinematography: Girish Gangadharan
- Edited by: Nizam Kadiry
- Music by: Vishnu Vijay
- Production companies: Chembosky Motion Pictures; OPM Cinemas
- Distributed by: OPM Cinemas
- Release date: 3 December 2021
- Country: India
- Language: Malayalam
- Budget: ₹3 crore

Bheemante Vazhi (transl. Bheeman's path) is a 2021 Indian Malayalam-language comedy drama film directed by Ashraf Hamza and written by Chemban Vinod Jose. It stars Kunchacko Boban and Megha Thomas, with Jose, Jinu Joseph, Naseer Sankranthi, Divya M. Nair and Chinnu Chandni in supporting roles. Vishnu Vijay composed the original songs and background score. Chemban Vinod Jose produced the film under Chembosky Motion Pictures in association with Rima Kallingal-Aashiq Abu's OPM Cinemas. The film received generally mixed reviews from critics.

== Plot ==
The story of Bheemante Vazhi takes place in a neighbourhood where twenty families reside along a dilapidated road next to a railway track. Everything takes an interesting turn when he decides to broaden the pathway.

Bheeman plans to broaden the pathway and starts coordinating with other people of that area. Everyone agrees to give up some part of their land for widening the pathway and build a road. But they face the hurdle of getting the buy-in from two people, Dr. Simon and Kostheppu. They would not get any benefit out of this road as they stay at the entrance of that area but had to give up some part of land for a larger cause. Dr. Simon was convinced. However, Kostheppu, a man with nefarious plans, wants to make use of this situation to mint money. Bheeman tries all possible means of success.

== Cast ==
- Kunchacko Boban as Sanjeev Shankar (Sanju) a.k.a. Bheeman
- Jinu Joseph as Oothampilly Kostheppu
- Chemban Vinod Jose as Maharshi
- Divya M Nair as Councilor Reetha
- Megha Thomas as Kinnari
- Arya Salim as Advocate Deepa
- Chinnu Chandni as Anju Chandran
- Vincy Aloshious as Blessy Paul
- Naseer Sankranthi as Gulaan Paul
- Jeeva Janardhanan as Sita
- Suraj Venjaramoodu as Manjali Tarseus
- Binu Pappu as Krishnadas (Dasan)
- Bhagath Manuel as Oothampilly Caspar
- Shabareesh Varma as Vivek Guddali Tachisthu
- Ashvin Mathew as Dr. Cedric Simon Athikuntham
- Shiny Sarah as Sanju's mother
- Nirmal Palazhi as Manilal
- Anand Bal as Anju's brother

== Production ==
Principal photography of the film began in December 2020 at Perassanur, Kuttipuram, Malappuram district, following COVID-19 protocols. This is Chemban Vinod's second script after Angamaly Diaries. Thamaasha fame Chinnu Chandni was roped in to play one of the female leads in the film. The filming completed in February 2021 and expected an April release, but has been delayed.

== Music ==
Bheemante Vazhi

Soundtrack album by Vishnu Vijay
- Released: 27 December 2021
- Recorded: 2020–2021
- Studio: 2 bar Q Studios, Chennai
- Genre: Feature film soundtrack
- Length: 12:35
- Label: OPM Records
- Producer: Vishnu Vijay

Vishnu Vijay chronology
Nayattu (2021)	Bheemante Vazhi (2021)	Pada (2022)

The original soundtrack is composed, programmed, and arranged by Vishnu Vijay with lyrics penned by Muhsin Parari.

Bheemante Vazhi
No.	Title	Lyrics	Music	Singer(s)	Length
1.	"Oruthi"	Muhsin Parari	Vishnu Vijay	Vishnu Vijay	04:30
2.	"Bheemante Vazhippattu"	Muhsin Parari	Vishnu Vijay	Haricharan	04:14
3.	"Pale Pole"	Muhsin Parari	Vishnu Vijay	M. G. Sreekumar	03:50
Total length:					12:35

== Release ==
The movie was first projected to release in April 2021, but was postponed due to COVID-19 pandemic in India. The film was released in theatres on 3 December 2021. After four weeks of theatrical run, the film was released in Amazon Prime Video on 30 December 2021.

== Reception ==
=== Critical response ===
Anna Mathews in their review for The Times of India, gave the film a 3.5/5 rating and stated: "Bheemante Vazhi is a sweet entertainer that audiences will enjoy, thanks to characters and situations they can identify with and laugh over."

Arun George of OnManorama gave the film a 3/5 rating in their review titled "Kunchacko Boban's Bheemante Vazhi cuts a predictable path into an everyday issue..."

In their review for Cinema Express, Sajin Shrijith described the film as a "lighthearted drama elevated by some clever moments" and states that "the film makes up for whatever shortcomings it has in the few highs accompanying the second and third acts."
