= Shyju Khalid =

Indian cinematographer

- Born: Shyju Khalid; Kochi, Kerala, India
- Occupations: Cinematographer; director; producer
- Years active: 2011–present
- Organisation: Happy Hours Entertainments
- Parent: V. P. Khalid
- Relatives: Khalid Rahman (brother); Jimshi Khalid (brother)

Shyju Khalid ISC is an Indian cinematographer, film director, and producer who works in Malayalam films. Shyju Khalid made his debut as cinematographer with Traffic (2011). His notable works are 22 Female Kottayam (2012), Idukki Gold (2013), Maheshinte Prathikaaram (2016), Traffic (2011), 5 Sundarikal (2013), Sudani From Nigeria (2018), Ee.Ma.Yau (2018) and Kumbalangi Nights (2019). He is a member of the Indian Society of Cinematographers (ISC). Film director Khalid Rahman and cinematographer Jimshi Khalid are his brothers.

== Career ==
In 2011, director Aashiq Abu suggested him as a cinematographer for Rajesh Pillai's Traffic. His work received recognition through the film. His second film, Salt N' Pepper (2011) was directed by Aashiq Abu. In 2012 he again worked with Abu in 22 Female Kottayam. Shyju directed a segment in the 2013 anthology film 5 Sundarikal. He has also co-produced the films Chandrettan Evideya, Kali, Sudani from Nigeria and Thamaasha under the banners Handmade Films and Happy Hours Entertainments.

== Filmography ==
=== As cinematographer ===
Year	Title	Notes
2011	Traffic	Debut film
2011	Salt N' Pepper	
2012	22 Female Kottayam	
2012	Da Thadiya	
2013	5 Sundarikal	Segment - Isha
2013	Idukki Gold	
2015	Chandrettan Evideya	
2016	Maheshinte Prathikaaram	
2017	Mayanadhi	2nd Unit Camera
2018	Ee.Ma.Yau	
2018	Sudani From Nigeria	
2019	Kumbalangi Nights	
2019	Virus	Additional Cinematographer
2020	Anjaam Pathiraa	
2021	Nayattu	
2021	Joji	
2021	Aanum Pennum	Segment-Rani
2022	Dear Friend	
2024	Manjummel Boys	
2025	Pravinkoodu Shappu	
2026	Balan: The Boy	
TBA	Nedumkandam Miracle †	

=== As director ===
Year	Film	Notes
2013	5 Sundarikal	Segment - Sethulakshmi

=== As producer ===
Year	Title	Notes
2015	Chandrettan Evideya	Co-produced with Sameer Thahir and Ashiq Usman
2016	Kali	Co-produced with Sameer Thahir and Ashiq Usman
2018	Sudani From Nigeria	Co-produced with Sameer Thahir
2019	Thamaasha	Co-produced with Sameer Thahir, Chemban Vinod Jose and Lijo Jose Pellissery
2022	Dear Friend	Co-produced with Sameer Thahir and Ashiq Usman
2024	Sookshmadarshini	Co-produced with Sameer Thahir and A. V. Anoop
2026	Dhoomakethu	Co-produced with Sameer Thahir, Sajin Ali and Abbas Thirunavaya

== Awards ==
Year	Film	Award	Category	Notes
2016	Maheshinte Prathikaaram	Vanitha Film Awards	Best Cinematographer	
2016	Maheshinte Prathikaaram	CPC Cine Awards	Best Cinematographer	
2016	Maheshinte Prathikaaram	North American Film Awards	Best Cinematographer	
2018	Sudani From Nigeria	66th National Film Awards	Best Feature Film in Malayalam	Award shared with Sameer Thahir and Zakariya Mohammed
2018	Sudani From Nigeria	49th Kerala State Film Awards	Best Film with Popular Appeal and Aesthetic Value	Award shared with Sameer Thahir and Zakariya Mohammed
2018	Sudani From Nigeria	SIIMA	Best Film	Award shared with Sameer Thahir and Zakariya Mohammed
2018	Sudani From Nigeria	SIIMA	Best Cinematographer	
2018	Sudani From Nigeria	Movie Street Film Awards	Best Cinematographer	
2018	Sudani From Nigeria	Movie Street Film Awards	Best Film	Award shared with Sameer Thahir and Zakariya Mohammed
2018	Sudani From Nigeria	21st Asianet Film Awards	Best Film	Award shared with Sameer Thahir
2018	Sudani From Nigeria	CPC Cine Awards	Best Movie	Award shared with Sameer Thahir
2018	Sudani From Nigeria	CPC Cine Awards	Best Cinematographer	
2018	Sudani From Nigeria	Vanitha Film Awards	Best Cinematographer	
2019	Kumbalangi Nights	Movie Street Film Awards	Best Cinematographer	
2024	Manjummel Boys	Kerala State Film Awards	Best Cinematography	
