= Toddy shop =

Retail shop that sells toddy and food

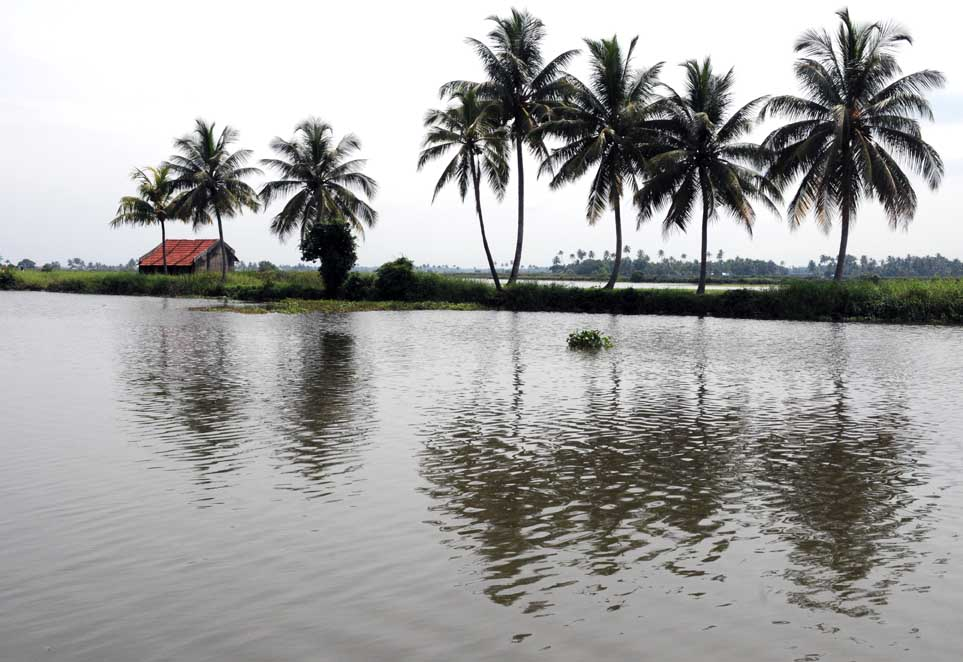
Toddy shop in Kerala

A toddy shop is a drinking establishment seen in some parts of India (particularly Kerala) where palm toddy, a mildly alcoholic beverage made from the sap of palm trees, is served along with food.

The food served with toddy is very spicy and hot with chilies. A main dish served is tapioca with red fish curry.

== See also ==
- Palm wine
