= Sulaikha Manzil =

2023 Indian film

- Theatrical release poster
- Directed by: Ashraf Hamza
- Written by: Ashraf Hamza
- Produced by: Chemban Vinod Jose; Subeesh Kannanchery; Sameer Karat
- Starring: Lukman Avaran; Anarkali Marikar
- Cinematography: Kannan Patteri
- Edited by: Noufal Abdullah
- Music by: Vishnu Vijay
- Production company: Chembosky Motion Pictures
- Distributed by: Century Films
- Release date: 21 April 2023
- Country: India
- Language: Malayalam

Sulaikha Manzil is a 2023 Indian Malayalam-language romantic comedy film directed by Ashraf Hamza under the banner Chembosky Motion Pictures. It stars Lukman Avaran, Anarkali Marikar and Chemban Vinod Jose in lead roles. The film was released on 21 April 2023 and received positive reviews from critics.

== Plot ==
The movie begins with a music video shot in a spoof-like manner, which can be related to the visual grammar of popular Malayalam music albums of the 2000s (a music single by singer Saleem Kodathur is used as the backing track, which can be traced back to the era). It can be seen that the lead actors of the movie (except Lukman Avaran) are acting in the song, where Haala is in love with a guy named Ashiq against her family's will. Eventually, Ashiq dies in a road accident.

Haala's brother Sameer is an NRI, who works in the UAE and has been in search of a groom for Haala for many years. Haala and Sameer are not on good terms for undisclosed reasons, and she rejects every proposal brought by Sameer. She finally agrees to marry Ameen, who also works in the UAE. Sameer and Ameen meet each other in the UAE and arrange the marriage on very short notice. Ameen is visibly confused about the short notice but agrees anyway.

Ameen wants to get acquainted with Haala before marriage, but she does not seem to care. Ameen calls her the day before marriage and discovers she hasn't even saved his contact information on her phone and he discusses the matter with his friend Anwar. Meanwhile, Haala discusses with her cousin Amina that she just lacks the "excitement" but is okay with the marriage. Ameen called Haala again, but she couldn't answer the phone. When she returned the call, Ameen said he wanted to meet her, and Haala agrees. But she couldn't make it as she was trapped with her relatives. Angered, Ameen calls Haala and scolds her while she is on speakerphone, and Amina and Bathool get involved. Amina asks Haala whether she wants to call off the wedding. Bathool, Haala's sister-in-law, however, suggests waiting sometime, and if Ameen calls back and says sorry, Haala should hear him. Haala agreed to this, and Ameen called back and expressed his regret. Now that both are happy, Ameen asked her again, and she said to come to her house secretly in the evening.

Ameen couldn't escape from his house but managed to get in a car with his friends and drive to Haala's house. He met Haala in her backyard and discussed his concerns. Haala said she can't get close with someone on such short notice, but she is trying. Ameen agrees initially but eventually starts a fight. Ameen decided to call off the wedding, and Haala is seen confused. Ameen and friends got in the car, but got stuck as it partially fell into a drainage canal. Guests and relatives from Haala's house came to the rescue and learned it was Ameen. They invited him to the house, and Ameen couldn't resist.

At Haala's house, celebrations have begun as Ameen came to the house unexpectedly and surprisingly. They asked Ameen to perform on stage, but a depressed Ameen stood still. Ameen decides to announce his decision but suddenly learns that everyone is so happy and he doesn't want to spoil the mood. He abandons his decision to call off the wedding at the moment and meets Haala. Haala asks why he changed his mind, and Ameen replies that he doesn't want to ruin people's happiness and will disclose the matter to Haala's family once he gets home. Haala clears Ameen's mind and says Ameen's decision to not ruin others' happiness is the best quality that she imagined in her life partner, and they both return happily.

The next day, at Haala's house, the Nikkah ceremony is about to begin. The priest asks Sameer whether he had his sister's permission for the wedding. Sameer remained silent, and the priest insisted that he do it formally in front of everyone. Sameer, overwhelmed with feelings, walks towards Haala and hugs her, and breaks the ice between them.

== Cast ==
- Lukman Avaran as Ameen Kasim
- Anarkali Marikar as Haala Parveen
- Shebin Benson as Ashiq Maliyekkal, Haala's ex-boyfriend (special appearance)
- Chemban Vinod Jose as Sameer Parveen, Haala's brother
- Amalda Liz as Bathool, Sameer's wife
- Shabareesh Varma as Ramzan, Ameen's brother-in-law
- Deepa Thomas as Dr. Amina Hussain, Haala's cousin
- Ganapathi S. Poduval as Adil, Haala's brother
- Noushad Ali as Anwar, Ameen's friend
- Archana Padmini as Hawwa, Ameen's sister
- Mamukkoya as Abdurahman, Ameen's uncle
- Nirmal Palazhi as Anakath Akbar, Haala's uncle
- Nikhil Ramachandran as Habeeb, Haala's cousin
- Jolly Chirayath as Haleema, Ameen's mother
- Shubha Sreedharan as Sulaikha, Haala's mother
- Pramod Veliyanad as Ambayath Subrahmanian
- Adhri Joe as Adnan, Haala's brother
- Shamsudheen as Arun, Ameen's friend
- Aswathi R. as Mirza, Adnan's wife
- Rithu as Fida
- Pranav Krishna as Kuttan
- Parthasarathi as Prasad
- Uma K. P. as Rukhiya, Abdurahman's wife
- Latheef Kuttippuram as Yaseen, Abdurahman's friend
- Thankamani as Khadeejatha
- Zakariya as Kasim Mash, Ameen's father
- Zaheer Ramla as Ameer, Ameen's brother
- John Clarinet as Musliyar
- Khalid Rahman (cameo appearance)

== Production ==
The first look poster was released in February 2023 and second look poster was released with the release date. Later teaser was released.

== Reception ==
Athira M critic of The Hindu stated that "overall, there isn't a lot to get enthused about the film other than the performances and the feel-good moments thrown in here and there". Archana Anoop of Onmanorama stated that "The film's biggest plus has to be Vishnu Vijay's soulful music, which captures the essence of Malabar Muslim weddings." Critics from Manorama News and Mathrubhumi gave mixed reviews.

== Music ==
Music was composed and produced by Vishnu Vijay. Lyrics were penned by Muhsin Parari and Dr. Shamshad Hussain. The soundtrack accompanied for the film has six songs in number. The song 'Jil Jil Jil' features stanzas from 'Aararum Manassil Ninnorikkalulm' - a yesteryear Mappila Paattu written by T. K. Kuttiyali and composed by T. K. Ramamoorthy. The album features one remix version and one re-recorded version of 'Ethra Naal', a music single by singer Saleem Kodathur with additional lyrics penned by Muhsin Parari. Vijay, Pushpavathy Poypadathu, Ahi Ajayan, Varsha Renjith, Meera Prakash and Muhsin Parari gave vocals for the tracks featured in the album. The soundtrack is influenced by traditional Muslim musical styles of Northern Kerala. It was released on 9 May 2023 by Think Music. The soundtrack album received positive feedback from music listeners and critics, appreciating Vishnu Vijay for his compositions and Muhsin Parari for the catchy and fresh lyrics.

Sulaikha Manzil

Soundtrack album by Vishnu Vijay
- Released: 9 May 2023
- Recorded: 2022–2023
- Studio: 2 Bar Q Studios, Chennai
- Genre: Film soundtrack
- Length: 22:02
- Language: Malayalam
- Label: Think Music
- Producer: Vishnu Vijay

Vishnu Vijay chronology
Thallumaala (2022)	Sulaikha Manzil (2023)	Kasargold (2023)
External audio
- Original Motion Picture Soundtrack, from Spotify
- Audio Jukebox on YouTube

=== Track listing ===
Sulaikha Manzil
No.	Title	Lyrics	Music	Singer(s)	Length
1.	"Haalaake Maarunne"	Muhsin Parari	Vishnu Vijay	Pushpavathy Poypadathu, Ahi Ajayan	03:16
2.	"Jil Jil Jil"	Muhsin Parari, T. K. Kuttiyali	Vishnu Vijay, T. K. Ramamoorthy	Varsha Renjith, Meera Prakash	05:36
3.	"Alankaara Puthukkangal"	Dr. Shamshad Hussain	Vishnu Vijay	Vishnu Vijay, Varsha Renjith	01:06
4.	"Ethra Naal"	Muhsin Parari, Saleem Kodathoor	Vishnu Vijay, Saleem Kodathoor	Vishnu Vijay, Muhsin Parari	02:57
5.	"Dua (Paramadhayaavin)"	Muhsin Parari	Vishnu Vijay	Vishnu Vijay	04:24
6.	"Ethra Naal (Album Version)"	Saleem Kodathoor	Saleem Kodathoor (re-recorded by Vishnu Vijay)	Saleem Kodathoor	04:41
Total length:					22:02

=== Promotional track ===
"Olam Up"

Single by Dabzee, Fathima Jahaan, Anarkali Marikar
- Language: Malayalam
- Released: 26 April 2023
- Genre: Folk, Hip-hop
- Length: 3:15
- Songwriter: Dabzee
- Producer: SHMR Music

Dabzee singles chronology
"Vecho Foot" (2022)	"Olam Up" (2023)	"Kali" (2023)
External audio
- Olam Up from Spotify
- Olam Up on YouTube

A promotional song titled "Olam Up" written and composed by Dabzee was released on 22 April 2023. The song was performed by Dabzee, Fathima Jahaan and Anarkali Marikar. The song was written in native Malabar slang, and music style influenced by traditional Mappila songs with elements of Hip hop music incorporated. The track gathered positive reviews.

== Awards ==
Year	Award	Category	Winner	Notes
2023	Kerala State Film Awards	Best Choreography	Jishnu	
