= Pravinkoodu Shappu =

2025 Indian film

Praavinkoodu Shappu
- Theatrical release poster
- Directed by: Sreeraj Sreenivasan
- Written by: Sreeraj Sreenivasan
- Produced by: Anwar Rasheed
- Starring: Soubin Shahir; Basil Joseph; Chemban Vinod Jose
- Cinematography: Shyju Khalid
- Edited by: Shafique Mohamed Ali
- Music by: Vishnu Vijay
- Production company: Anwar Rasheed Entertainment
- Distributed by: Anwar Rasheed Entertainment
- Release date: 16 January 2025
- Running time: 149 minutes
- Country: India
- Language: Malayalam
- Budget: ₹14.5 crore
- Box office: ₹8.36 crore

Pravinkoodu Shappu (transl. Pravinkoodu toddy shop) is a 2025 Indian Malayalam-language black comedy crime thriller film written and directed by Sreeraj Sreenivasan (in his directorial debut). It was produced by Anwar Rasheed through Anwar Rasheed Entertainment. The film stars Soubin Shahir, Basil Joseph and Chemban Vinod Jose, with Chandini Sreedharan, Shivajith, and Shabareesh Varma in supporting roles.

Filming started on 29 February 2024 in Thrissur and Ernakulam. Initially scheduled for a Christmas 2024 release, the launch was postponed. The film released in theatres on 16 January 2025 to mixed reviews from critics alike with praise for the performances, cinematography, editing, sound design and background score but received criticism for its script.

== Premise ==
The story follows the investigation of a death at a toddy shop. After the shop closed due to rain, 11 people remained inside, drinking and playing cards overnight. By morning, the shop owner, Komban Babu, is found hanging in the centre of the shop. A police officer questions the 11 individuals present that night to uncover what happened. The investigation reveals hidden details, raising the question of who killed Komban Babu and why his body was left hanging in the shop.

== Plot ==
Komban Babu, a feared and influential toddy shop owner with a history of illicit dealings, is found dead—hanged inside his own toddy shop. Initially presumed to be a suicide, Sub-Inspector (SI) Santosh begins investigating the case. After examining the crime scene and interrogating all those present in the toddy shop that night—including Kannan, Suni, Biju, Ceylon, and others—he concludes that it is a case of premeditated murder.

Ceylon informs Santosh that Merinda, Kannan's wife, had once been involved in an affair with Babu. Kannan, a physically disabled man, was aware of this but was powerless against Babu's dominance. This gives Kannan a possible motive, but as the investigation progresses, Santosh begins to suspect Suni, Babu's close associate in his criminal ventures. During interrogation, Merinda reveals that she had seen a masked figure lurking around the toddy shop premises on the night of the murder, leading Santosh to believe that Suni may have had an accomplice who helped him carry out the murder unnoticed while the others were distracted.

Despite pressure from his superiors, Santosh is unable to identify the alleged accomplice through the CCTV footage, which yields no suspicious activity. He also develops a personal interest in Merinda and attempts to grow closer to her, but she resists his advances.

Meanwhile, Suni and Kannan start their own covert investigation to determine if it was even feasible to hang someone from the toddy shop ceiling without alerting others nearby. Using a similar rope and weight, they experiment and conclude it is possible. During this time, Kannan reveals that he had witnessed Babu murder Santosh's father, who was in the liquor business too and used to be Babu's partner. Babu had assaulted Kannan and Merinda when Kannan tried to speak up, resulting in Merinda suffering a miscarriage. Seeking revenge, Kannan and Merinda had been secretly plotting Babu's murder.

On the night of the murder, Kannan mixed sleeping pills into Babu's toddy, rendering him unconscious. As others played cards in an adjacent room, Kannan carefully placed a noose around Babu's neck. Merinda then attached the other end of the rope to Babu's parked pickup truck outside and drove it, causing Babu's death to appear as a hanging. To mislead the investigation, they spread rumours of Merinda's affair and fabricated the masked intruder story, diverting suspicion towards Suni.

Kannan further manipulates Suni by planting the idea that Santosh may be orchestrating the events to frame Suni and cover up his personal vendetta. Tensions rise, and in a confrontation between the two, Kannan accidentally stabs and kills Suni after accidentally setting fire to the toddy shop.

The same night, Merinda calls Santosh, claiming that a masked intruder is trying to kill her. As Santosh rushes to her home, he simultaneously receives a wireless message that the toddy shop has been set on fire. These events unfold while a flashback reveals the details of Babu's murder. Eventually, Santosh pieces together the truth behind the murder. He confronts Kannan and Merinda as they attempt to flee. In the ensuing confrontation, Santosh accidentally shoots and wounds Merinda. Kannan gets arrested. The film ends with Santosh sitting beside Merinda in a hospital, as the case is formally brought to a close.

== Cast ==
- Soubin Shahir as Kannan, waiter at the toddy parlour, and ex-magician
- Basil Joseph as SI Santhosh C. J, the investigating officer
- Chemban Vinod Jose as Suni, an ex-military officer and real estate agent
- Chandini Sreedharan as Merinda, Kannan's wife
- Shivajith as Komban Babu, toddy shop owner
- Shabareesh Varma as Thotta Biju
- Niyas Backer as 'Ceylon' Ramakrishnan
- Vijo Amaravathy
- Rajesh Azhikodan
- Jyothika Krish
- Prathapan K.S.
- Devarajan Kozhikode
- George Vincent
- Sundaran Thachappilly as Subran
- Revathy

== Release ==
Pravinkoodu Shappu was released theatrically on 16 January 2025. The film began streaming on SonyLIV from 11 April 2025.

== Reception ==
Vignesh Madhu of the Indian Express gave the film 2.5 out of 5 rating saying "Pravinkoodu Shappu' is a fairly engaging film with ample thrills and some hilarious dark humour. But these elements don't come together in the right proportions to create a rousing experience".

== Soundtrack ==
The film's soundtrack album and background score was composed by Vishnu Vijay.

No.	Title	Lyrics	Singer(s)	Length
1.	"Shavathkuth"	Muhsin Parari	Dabzee, Gayathri Rajeev, Devu Mathew, Geethu Nirmala	2.53
2.	"Kedathe"	Muhsin Parari	Vishnu Vijay	3.37
3.	"Cheth Song"	Vinayak Sasikumar	Vishnu Vijay, Aparna Harikumar, Indu Sanath, Padmaja Sreenivasan	3.45
4.	"Shaap Shooter"	Suhail Koya	Shakthisree Gopalan	2.36
Total length:				12.53
