= KL 10 Patthu =

KL 10 Pathu
- Theatrical release poster
- Directed by: Muhsin Parari
- Written by: Muhsin Parari
- Produced by: Alexander Mathew; Satheesh Mohan; LJ Films
- Starring: Unni Mukundan; Chandini Sreedharan; Saiju Kurup; Aju Varghese; Sreenath Bhasi; Neeraj Madhav; Mamukkoya
- Cinematography: Vishnu Narayanan
- Edited by: Manoj
- Music by: Bijibal
- Distributed by: LJ Films
- Release date: 18 July 2015
- Country: India
- Language: Malayalam

KL 10 Patthu (denoted as KL10 or KL Patthu) is a 2015 Indian Malayalam-language romantic comedy film written and directed by Muhsin Parari in his directorial debut. Unni Mukundan and Chandini Sreedharan portray the lead characters, with Saiju Kurup, Aju Varghese, Neeraj Madhav, Mamukkoya, and Sreenath Bhasi in supporting roles.

== Plot ==
The film begins when Jinn narrates about a village and a few of the village guys, including Ahmed, a web journalist and passionate football player - who sees a girl at a film festival in Kozhikode and is smitten. Shadiya joins his college for a project and the teacher asks Ahmed to guide Shadiya about the lectures and college campus. The two fall in love and decide to marry secretly. Being his best friend, Ahmed tells Faizal about his affair and their upcoming marriage. Faizal shares that with Ajmal, Ahmed's brother, on the day when Shadiya and Ahmed leave the town for their wedding. Ajmal, along with Faizal and a few of their friends, goes in search of Ahmed and Shadiya. The film portrays what transpires in the rest of the day.

== Cast ==
- Unni Mukundan as Ahmed
- Chandini Sreedharan as Shadiya Mansoor & Nadiya Mansoor
- Saiju Kurup as Ajmal
- Sreenath Bhasi as Djinn
- Mamukoya as Hamsakutty
- Aju Varghese as Chekutty
- Neeraj Madhav as Afthab
- Aneesh Menon as Yousef
- Lukman Avaran as Nasarullah
- Shivaji Guruvayoor as Beeran
- Anil Murali as Bavakka
- Rajesh Hebbar as Kunju
- Ahmed Sidhique as Rosshan
- Neena Kurup as Raseena
- Thomas Kuriakose
- Santhosh Keezhattoor as Ali Sir
- Sudhi Koppa as Nizam
- Pradeep Kottayam as Registrar

== Music ==
All lyrics are written by Umbachy and Santhosh Varma; all music is composed by Bijibal.

KL 10 Patthu
No.	Title	Singer(s)	Length
1.	"Duniyaavin"	Bijibal	03:35
2.	"Enthaanu Khalbe"	Soumya Ramakrishnan, Najim Arshad, Palakkad Sreeram	03:30
3.	"Halaakinte Avalumkanji"	Benny Dayal	02:38
Total length:			09:43
