= Thamaasha =

2019 Indian Malayalam-language film

- First look poster
- Directed by: Ashraf Hamza
- Written by: Ashraf Hamza
- Based on: Ondu Motteya Kathe by Raj B. Shetty
- Produced by: Sameer Thahir; Shyju Khalid; Lijo Jose Pellissery; Chemban Vinod Jose
- Starring: Vinay Forrt; Chinnu Chandni; Divya Prabha; Grace Antony
- Cinematography: Sameer Thahir
- Edited by: Shafique Mohamed Ali
- Music by: Rex Vijayan; Yakzan-Neha
- Production company: Happy Hours Entertainments
- Release date: 5 June 2019
- Country: India
- Language: Malayalam

Thamaasha (transl. Joke) is a 2019 Indian Malayalam-language film written and directed by Ashraf Hamza and produced by Sameer Thahir, Shyju Khalid, Lijo Jose Pellissery and Chemban Vinod Jose.The film stars Vinay Forrt, Chinnu Chandni, Divya Prabha and Grace Antony. The music was composed by Rex Vijayan and Shahabaz Aman. The film released in theaters on 5 June 2019. It is an official remake of the 2017 Kannada movie Ondu Motteya Kathe.

== Plot ==
Srinivasan, a Malayalam professor with a balding pate, is unable to find a suitable woman to marry. After a number of failed attempts, orchestrated by a marriage broker, Srinivasan, persuaded by his friend Rahim, decides to approach women directly. The story of Rahim's marriage with Ameera further encourages Srinivasan in his pursuit of finding love. Srinivasan develops an interest in his colleague, Babitha. As his attempts to court her were proceeding, Babitha takes fancy to a handsome young professor who has joined the college. This discourages Srinivasan and he gives up the dream of having a married life.

Meanwhile, he encounters, Safiya who takes an interest in him. However, it turns out that she was interested in him as a potential client for her company, which markets hairpiece for balding individuals. His family, keen to get him married, arranges a meeting with a woman, Chinnu. He appears at the meeting with a hairpiece and is dejected to find that Chinnu is obese. After an embarrassing incident in which his hairpiece comes off, he flees, leaving the hairpiece behind. Chinnu meets him to return his hairpiece and on her way back her scooty hits an elderly man. Srinivasan, forced by Rahim, accompanies Chinnu to the hospital. Circumstances lead him to stay overnight at the hospital to take care of the old man. He also accompanies Chinnu to drop the man at his home. This incident paves the way for further meetings and she invites him to visit an art festival being held in Kochi. As a memoir of a well spent evening, Chinnu takes a selfie with Srinivasan, which she posts on her Facebook page.

The post garners plenty of negative comments emphasising Chinnu's obesity and Srinivasan's balding pate. Disturbed by the comments and on advice of his colleagues, Srinivasan requests Chinnu to delete the picture. She is reluctant to delete the post and asks him to reconsider. This infuriates him further, and he insists on deleting the picture and stops further contact with her. Following the incident, a grief-stricken Chinnu uploads a live video on Facebook. In her video she questions the society's mindset towards obese individuals and declares that she is comfortable in her own skin.

She also accused the society of endangering her relationship with people who stand beside her. On his visit to Rahim's house, Srinivasan is taken aback when he realises Ameera is mute by birth. He repents his actions and on advice of his brother decides to apologise to Chinnu. Srinivasan finds her in a cancer centre where she was a part of 'donate your hair' campaign. He looks at her and complements her new hair style. Together they walk towards a new beginning.

== Cast ==
- Vinay Forrt as Srinivasan
- Chinnu Chandni as Chinnu
- Divya Prabha as Babitha Teacher
- Grace Antony as Safia
- John Clarinet as Appukuttan Vaidyar, Srinivasan's father
- Uma K.P as Srinivasan's mother
- Arun Kurian as Kamal, Srinivasan's brother
- Navas Vallikkunnu as Raheem
- Arya Salim as Ameera
- Mersheena Neenu as Guest Appearance

== Soundtrack ==
Thamaasha

Soundtrack album by Rex Vijayan
- Released: 19 June 2019
- Recorded: 2019
- Studio: Estudio Uno
- Genre: Feature film soundtrack
- Length: 29:54
- Language: Malayalam
- Label: Happy Hours Entertainment
- Producer: Rex Vijayan

Rex Vijayan chronology
Sudani from Nigeria (2018)	Thamaasha (2019)	Valiyaperunnal (2019)
External audio
- Audio Jukebox on YouTube

The music is produced by Rex Vijayan. The song Paadi Njan is composed by Shahabaz Aman, produced and arranged by Rex Vijayan. The film score is composed and produced by Rex Vijayan along with Yakzan Gary Pereira and Neha Nair. Lyrics were penned by Muhsin Parari.

Thamaasha (Original Motion Picture Soundtrack)
No.	Title	Lyrics	Artist(s)	Length
1.	"Paadi Njan"	Muhsin Parari	Shahabaz Aman	3:13
2.	"Kaanumbol Ninne"	Muhsin Parari	AshaJeevan	3:52
3.	"First page"			0:45
4.	"The bad omen"			0:21
5.	"First love"			0:21
6.	"The lunch box"			1:50
7.	"Aham brahmaasmi (Solitude)"		Abhiram Radhakrishnan	1:28
8.	"The bubble"			0:22
9.	"Sweet Revenge"			0:27
10.	"Masala Chaya"		Neha Nair	1:26
11.	"Sugalolupatha"			0:19
12.	"Adrenaline Rush"			0:38
13.	"Funeral of a desperate"			0:54
14.	"The amazing Chinnu"			0:34
15.	"Is that you"			0:15
16.	"Nothing to say"			0:29
17.	"Look at you"			0:43
18.	"The yellow cover"			0:24
19.	"Look after"			0:46
20.	"Bucket list"			1:28
21.	"They all know"			0:20
22.	"Why so insane"			0:38
23.	"Grievance"			0:21
24.	"Metamorphosis"			0:54
25.	"I miss you"			0:40
26.	"Reminisce"			0:54
27.	"With you it all make sense"			1:33
28.	"Happy end"			1:49
Total length:				29:54

== Reception ==
=== Critical reception ===
Manorama review praised on the film's brilliance in cutting through stereotypes based on looks and exploring aspects of body shaming. The review also commented that its Vinay Forrt's best performance of the year. They also praised Chinnu Chandini's performance and commented for having the heart of Roseanne Conner from Roseanne.
