= Khalid Rahman =

Indian film director

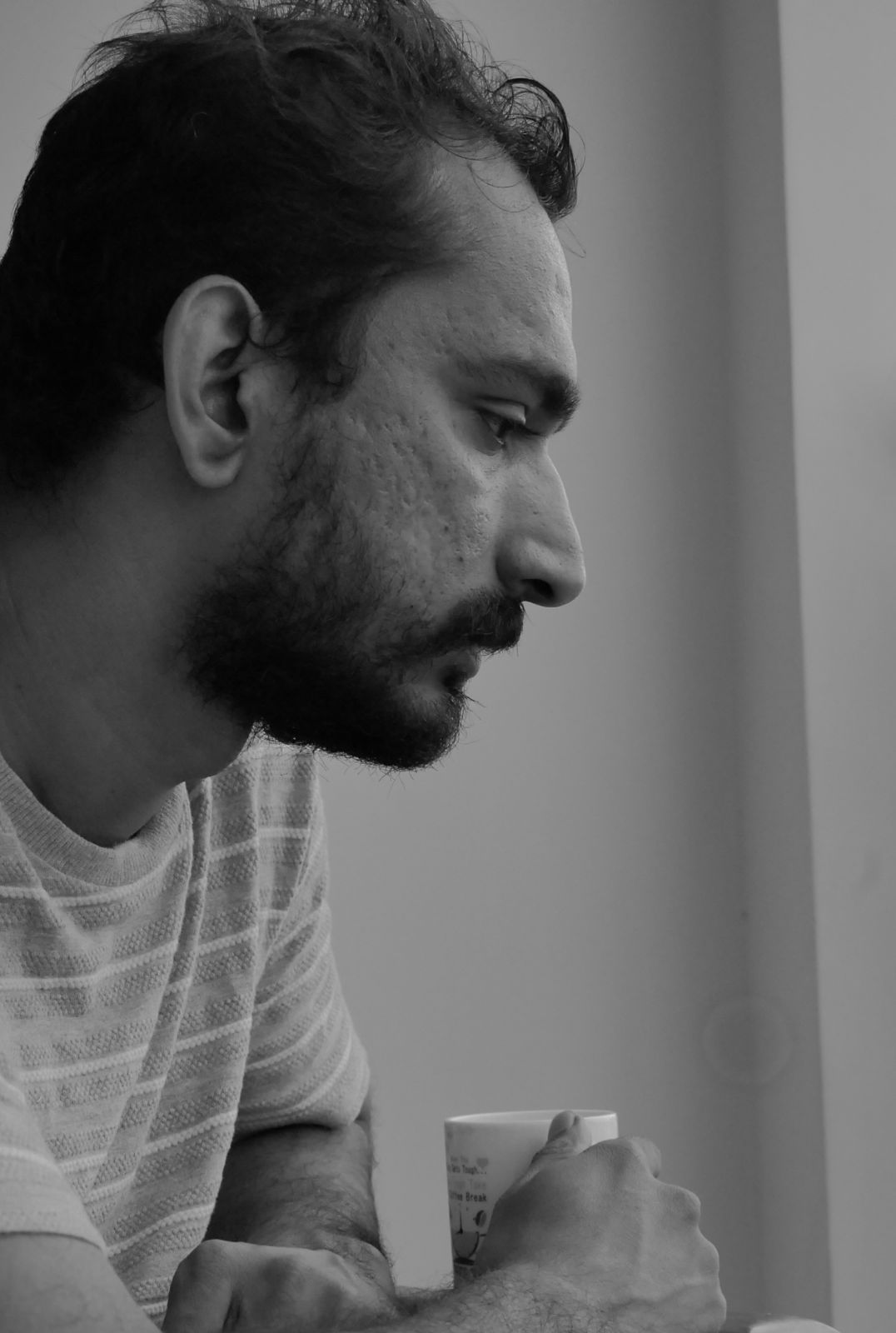
- Rahman in 2022
- Born: Rahman Khalid; 15 November 1990 (age 35); Kochi, Kerala, India
- Occupations: Film director; Screenwriter
- Years active: 2012–present
- Parent: V. P. Khalid
- Relatives: Shyju Khalid (brother); Jimshi Khalid (brother)

Khalid Rahman is an Indian film director and actor who works in the Malayalam film Industry. He made his debut directorial with the film Anuraga Karikkin Vellam. His other works include Unda, Love and Thallumaala.

== Family ==
Noted director-cinematographer, Shyju Khalid, and cinematographer, Jimshi Khalid, are his brothers.

== Career ==
He started his career in the Malayalam film industry as an assistant director in movies like Ustad Hotel, North 24 Kaatham, and Sapthamashree Thaskaraha. He also acted in cameo roles in films such as Parava and Mayaanadhi. His first two feature films, Anuraga Karikkin Vellam and Unda, performed very well commercially and opened to positive responses. His third film Love, shot during the COVID-19 pandemic lockdown, was set indoors and was released on OTT through Netflix. Khalid Rahman's next film, Thallumaala, was a box-office success. Critics praised the film for its bold, stylized visuals and action sequences, which were a departure from the traditional realism of Malayalam cinema.

== Filmography ==
=== As director ===
Year	Title	Notes
2016	Anuraga Karikkin Vellam	Debut film
2019	Unda	
2020	Love	
2022	Thallumaala	
2025	Alappuzha Gymkhana	
TBA	Mattancherry Mafia	

=== As an actor ===
Year	Title	Role	Notes
2013	North 24 Kaatham	Auto driver	Also assistant director
2014	Sapthamashree Thaskaraha	Arrestee	Also assistant director
2017	Parava	Drug addict	
2017	Mayaanadhi	Assistant director	
2023	Sulaikha Manzil		Cameo appearance
2024	Manjummel Boys	Prasad	
2024	Nadikar		
2026	I, Nobody	Koshy	

=== As an assistant director ===
Year	Film	Notes
2012	Ustad Hotel	
2013	North 24 Kaatham	
2014	Sapthamashree Thaskaraha	

=== As a playback singer ===
Year	Film	Notes
2022	Thallumaala	"Thoottikkanoda Patha"

== Awards ==
Year	Film	Award	Category	Notes
2017	Anuraga Karikkin Vellam	Vanitha Film Awards	Best Deubtant Director	Won
2019	Unda	CPC Cine Awards	Best Director	Nominated

== Controversy ==
On 27 April 2025, Rahman and Ashraf Hamza along with another person were arrested on Early Morning by Excise Department in Kochi for possession of 1.6 grams of hybrid Cannabis.
