= Vishnu Vijay =

Indian film score composer

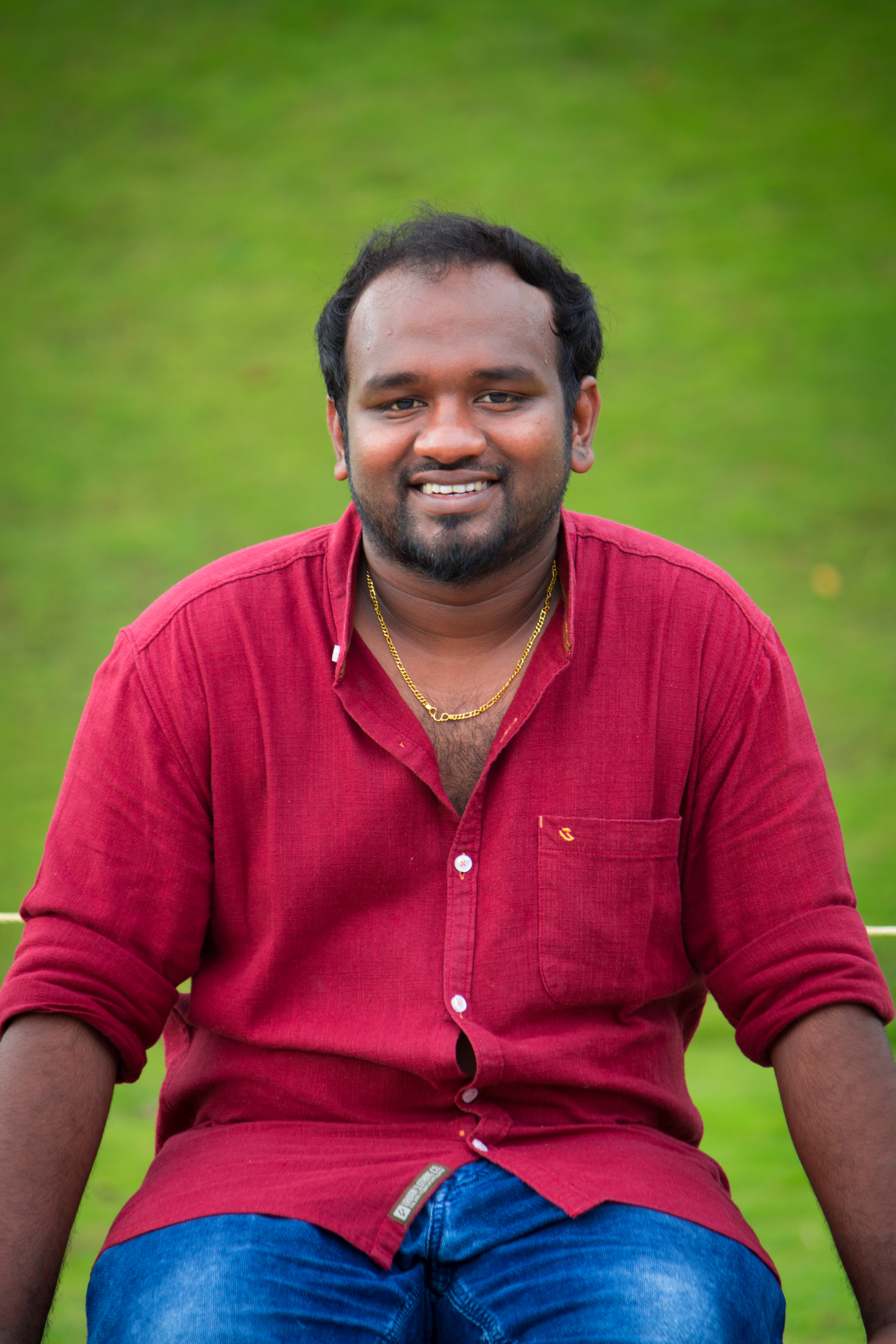

Background information
- Born: 1 December 1988 (age 37); Thiruvananthapuram, Kerala, India
- Genres: Film score; Filmi
- Occupations: Music producer; music director; flautist
- Instruments: Vocals; flute
- Years active: 2005–present

Vishnu Vijay is an Indian music composer and a prolific flautist who works predominantly in Malayalam cinema. His film music career began with the 2016 Malayalam film Guppy. His other works include Ambili (2019), Thallumaala (2022), Sulaikha Manzil (2023), Premalu (2024), Alappuzha Gymkhana(2025) and Bethlehem Kudumba Unit (2026).

== Early life ==
Vijay has attended Government Model Boys Higher Secondary School, Thiruvananthapuram for schooling then bachelor of performing arts degree and is a vocal music graduate from Swathi Thirunal College of Music, Thiruvananthapuram. He has received musical training from Kudamaloor Janardanan.

== Career ==
Vishnu has worked with composers Devi Sri Prasad in Tamil and Telugu and also with G. V. Prakash Kumar, Vijay Antony and Santhosh Narayanan in Tamil, prior to making it into the Malayalam industry. He has also worked with Amit Trivedi. In Malayalam he has associated with Ouseppachan, Gopi Sunder, Vidyasagar and Deepak Dev.

=== Scoring and soundtracks ===
Vijay debuted as an independent music composer through the 2016 Malayalam movie Guppy.

== Awards ==
- 47th Kerala State Film Awards – Best Background Music – Guppy

== Discography ==
Year	Title	Language	Notes
2016	Guppy	Malayalam	Won the Kerala State Film Award for Best Background Music
2019	Ambili	Malayalam	
2021	Nayattu	Malayalam	
2021	Bheemante Vazhi	Malayalam	
2022	Pada	Malayalam	
2022	Makal	Malayalam	Songs only
2022	Thallumaala	Malayalam	
2023	Sulaikha Manzil	Malayalam	
2023	Kasargold	Malayalam	The album also features songs by Niranj Suresh
2023	Falimy	Malayalam	Also credited as singer for three songs
2024	Premalu	Malayalam	
2024	Laughing Buddha	Kannada	
2025	Pravinkoodu Shappu	Malayalam	
2025	Alappuzha Gymkhana	Malayalam	
2025	Lovely	Malayalam	
2026	Thalaivar Thambi Thalaimaiyil	Tamil	
2026	Athiradi	Malayalam	
2026	Bethlehem Kudumba Unit	Malayalam	
TBA	Mela †	Malayalam	
