= Dabzee =

Indian rapper and music producer (born 1991)

- Born: Mohammed Fazil Dabzee; 30 May 1991 (age 35); Changaramkulam, Malappuram, Kerala, India
- Occupations: Rapper; singer; songwriter; lyricist; record producer
- Years active: 2020 - Present
- Musical career
- Genres: Pop rap; pop
- Label: Mass Appeal India

Mohammed Fasil (born 30 May 1991), known professionally as Dabzee, is an Indian rapper, singer and songwriter from Kerala. He is well known for his film debut as a rapper with the song "Manavaalan Thug" from the movie Thallumaala .

== Personal life ==
Fasil was born in Malappuram, Kerala. Following his marriage, he relocated to the United Arab Emirates where he initially pursued work in a conventional job. However, his passion for music led him to quit his job and started his focus towards rapping and music making.

== Career ==
=== 2020: Manushyar ===
Fazil started his music career in 2020 with his first successful single MANUSHYAN with Manushyar. The group "Manushyar" consists of Dabzee, M.H.R, Joker390P and SA.

In 2021, they released Oora's music video which portrayed support towards the farmers and their protests, the release was significantly known for its message .

In 2023, they released Malabari Banger which rose to charts, grossing Top 4 in the iTunes Dance Charts, and with over millions of streams.

=== 2022 - present ===
In 2022, he released his first independent Kannada-Malayalam track "Bharaverse" along with Moeha, and V3K.

In the same year, he made his film debut as a rapper with the song "Manavaalan Thug" which appeared in the Malayalam film "Thallumaala" starring Tovino Thomas. The track got significantly popular, featuring on Top 40 Asian Music Chart in Official Charts, and grossing over 100 million streams. He initially revealed that "Manavaalan Thug" was first a track intended for his independent album.

On 11 December 2022, he was invited to perform at the Spotify's 91 Rap Live event which was held at Jio Conventional Centre, Mumbai. The event featured 20 hip-hop rappers, singers, and music producers.

In 2023, he contributed rap vocals and lyrics to the song "Kotha Raja" for the Malayalam film King of Kotha, starring Dulquer Salman. The song was composed, arranged and produced by Jakes Bejoy, featuring Asal Kolaar, Roll Rida and Mu.Ri. The track was featured in Top 20 rank in Soundtracks Charts by Apple Music.

The same year, he released "La Vida" with KSHMR along with Vedan. The track was signed to Mass Appeal Records.

He wrote and composed the promotional song "Olam Up" for the film Sulaikha Manzil which was released on 21 April 2023.

He was featured in the track "Sambar" which featured the Malayalam Industry's popular hip-hop artists ThirumaLi, FEJO, and Thudwiser. The track was grossing No.1 in UAE YouTube Top 10 Music Charts for a week, with over 6 million+. The track was signed to Mass Appeal India as well.

He wrote and sang a promo song titled "Mada Trance" for the movie Pulimada, which was released on 26 October 2023.

In 2024, he began his international tour, starting in Europe. He sang the song "Illuminati" from the Malayalam movie Aavesham starring Fahadh Faasil. The song was composed by Sushin Shyam.

== Controversy ==
In May 2025, Dabzee and three of his friends were arrested on a Friday night in connection with a dispute over a financial transaction. They were later released on station bail (Note: Attributed to multiple sources based on Financial arrest.).
