= 65th Filmfare Awards South =

Award ceremony for South Indian films

- Date: 16 June 2018
- Site: Hyderabad, Telangana, India
- Hosted by: Rahul Ravindran; Sundeep Kishan
- Produced by: Jio

Highlights
- Best Picture: Ondu Motteya Kathe (Kannada), Thondimuthalum Driksakshiyum (Malayalam), Aramm (Tamil), Baahubali: The Conclusion (Telugu)
- Most awards: Baahubali: The Conclusion (Telugu), 8
- Most nominations: Baahubali: The Conclusion (Telugu), 12

The 65th Filmfare Awards South ceremony honoring the winners and nominees of the best of South Indian cinema in 2017 was held on 16 June 2018 at Novotel and HICC Complex in Hyderabad. The nominations for all the main awards were announced on 4 June 2018.

== List of nominees ==
=== Main awards ===
==== Kannada cinema ====
Best Film	Best Director
Ondu Motteya Kathe; Chowka; Dayavittu Gamanisi; Shuddhi; Urvi	Tarun Sudhir – Chowka; Jayatheertha – Beautiful Manasugalu; Raj B. Shetty – Ondu Motteya Kathe; Rohith Padaki – Dayavittu Gamanisi; Santhosh Ananddram – Raajakumara
Best Actor	Best Actress
Puneeth Rajkumar – Raajakumara; Darshan – Tarak; Ganesh – Mugulu Nage; Shiva Rajkumar – Mufti; Sudeep – Hebbuli	Sruthi Hariharan – Beautiful Manasugalu; Nivedhitha – Shuddhi; Rashmika Mandanna – Chamak; Shanvi Srivastava – Tarak; Shraddha Srinath – Operation Alamelamma
Best Supporting Actor	Best Supporting Actress
P. Ravishankar – College Kumar; Achyuth Kumar – Beautiful Manasugalu; H. G. Dattatreya – Kempirve; Devaraj – Tarak; Vasishta N. Simha – Dayavittu Gamanisi	Bhavani Prakash – Urvi; Aruna Balraj – Operation Alamelamma; Samyukta Hornad – Dayavittu Gamanisi; Usha Bhandari – Ondu Motteya Kathe; Veena Sundar – Kaafi Thota
Best Music Director	Best Lyricist
B. J. Bharath – Beautiful Manasugalu; Anoop Seelin – Dayavittu Gamanisi; Arjun Janya – Chakravarthi; Ravi Basrur – Anjani Putra; V. Harikrishna – Raajakumara	V. Nagendra Prasad – "Appa I Love You" from Chowka; Jayanth Kaikini – "Roopasi Summane" from Mugulu Nage; K. Kalyan – "Bandano Sahukara" from Anjani Putra; Santhosh Ananddram – "Bombe Heluthaithe" from Raajakumara; Yogaraj Bhat – "Iduvarege Badukella" from Aprilna Himabindu
Best Playback Singer – Male	Best Playback Singer – Female
Armaan Malik – "Ondu Malebillu" from Chakravarthi; Raghu Dixit – "Iduvarege Badukella" from Aprilna Himabindu; Sonu Nigam – "Roopasi Summane" from Mugulu Nage; Vasishta N. Simha – "Marethe Hodenu" from Dayavittu Gamanisi; Vijay Prakash – "Bombe Heluthaithe" from Raajakumara	Anuradha Bhat – "Appa I Love You" from Chowka; Eesha Suchi – "Preethi Maruva Santheyalli" from Beautiful Manasugalu; Indu Nagaraj – "Sanje Hotthu" from Tarak; R. K. Sparsha – "O Manase" from Kempirve; Supriya Lohith – "Nee Nanna Olavu" from Chamak
Critics Best Actor	Critics Best Actress
Dhananjaya – Allama	Shraddha Srinath – Operation Alamelamma

==== Malayalam cinema ====
Best Film	Best Director
Thondimuthalum Driksakshiyum; Angamaly Diaries; Mayanadhi; Rakshadhikari Baiju Oppu; Take Off	Dileesh Pothan – Thondimuthalum Driksakshiyum; Aashiq Abu – Mayanadhi; Lijo Jose Pellissery – Angamaly Diaries; Mahesh Narayan – Take Off; Soubin Shahir- Parava
Best Actor	Best Actress
Fahadh Faasil – Thondimuthalum Driksakshiyum; Biju Menon – Rakshadhikari Baiju Oppu; Dulquer Salmaan – Solo; Mohanlal – Munthiri Vallikal Thalirkkumbol; Nivin Pauly – Sakhavu; Tovino Thomas – Mayanadhi	Parvathy Thiruvothu – Take Off; Aishwarya Lekshmi – Mayanadhi; Anu Sithara – Ramante Edanthottam; Manju Warrier – Udaharanam Sujatha; Nimisha Sajayan – Thondimuthalum Driksakshiyum
Best Supporting Actor	Best Supporting Actress
Alencier – Thondimuthalum Driksakshiyum; Joju George – Udaharanam Sujatha; Kunchacko Boban – Take Off; Renji Panicker – Godha; Sarath – Angamaly Diaries	Shanthi Krishna – Njandukalude Nattil Oridavela; Aishwarya Rajesh – Jomonte Suvisheshangal; Anna Rajan – Angamaly Diaries; Aparna Balamurali – Sarvopari Palakkaran; Srinda – Sherlock Toms
Best Music Director	Best Lyricist
Rex Vijayan – Mayanadhi; Bijibal – Ramante Edanthottam; Gopi Sunder – Udaharanam Sujatha; Prashant Pillai – Angamaly Diaries; Shaan Rahman – Godha	Anwar Ali – "Mizhiyil Ninnu Mizhiyilekku" from Mayanadhi; B. K. Harinarayanan – "Ee Kaattuvannu Kathil" from Adam Joan; Rafeeq Ahamed – "Ekayayi Neeyente" from Kaattu; Rafeeq Ahamed – "Kaattilila Polengo" from Udaharanam Sujatha; Santhosh Varma – "Akale Oru Kadinte" from Ramante Edanthottam
Best Playback Singer – Male	Best Playback Singer – Female
Shahabaz Aman – "Mizhiyil Ninnu Mizhiyilekku" from Mayanadhi; Haricharan – "Lailakame" from Ezra; Karthik – "Ee Kaatu Vannu" from Adam Joan; Shreekumar Vakkiyil – "Ayalathe penninte" from Angamaly Diaries; Vijay Yesudas – "Kaiveesi neeyenne" from The Great Father	K. S. Chithra – "Nadavathil Thurannilla" from Kambhoji; Gayathri Varma – "Kasavu Njorium" from Udaharanam Sujatha; Shreya Ghoshal – "Akale Oru Kaadinte" from Ramante Edanthottam; Shweta Mohan – "Orupuzhayarikil" from Munthiri Vallikal Thalirkkumbol; Sithara Krishnakumar – "Vanamakalunnu" from Vimaanam
Critics Best Actor	Critics Best Actress
Tovino Thomas – Mayaanadhi	Manju Warrier – Udaharanam Sujatha

==== Tamil cinema ====
Best Film	Best Director
Aramm; Aruvi; Taramani; Theeran Adhigaram Ondru; Vikram Vedha	Pushkar-Gayathri – Vikram Vedha; Arun Prabu Purushothaman – Aruvi; Atlee – Mersal; Dhanush – Power Paandi; Gopi Nainar – Aramm; H. Vinoth – Theeran Adhigaram Ondru
Best Actor	Best Actress
Vijay Sethupathi – Vikram Vedha as Vedha; Karthi – Theeran Adhigaram Ondru as Theeran Thirumaaran IPS; Madhavan – Vikram Vedha as Vikram; Rajkiran – Power Paandi as Pandian Pazhanisami; Vijay – Mersal as Vetri / Maaran / Vetrimaaran	Nayantara – Aramm as Madhivadhani IAS; Aditi Balan – Aruvi as Aruvi; Amala Paul – Thiruttu Payale 2 as Agalya Selvam; Andrea Jeremiah – Taramani as Althea Johnson; Jyotika – Magalir Mattum as Prabhavathy; Revathi – Power Paandi as Poonthendral
Best Supporting Actor	Best Supporting Actress
Prasanna – Thiruttu Payale 2 as Balakrishnan; Abhimanyu Singh – Theeran Adhigaram Ondru as Omveer "Oma"; S. J. Suryah – Mersal as Daniel Arockiyaraj; Vinay Rai – Thupparivaalan as John Richardson Holcha/Devil; Vivek Oberoi – Vivegam as Aryan Singha	Nithya Menon – Mersal as Aishwarya Vetrimaaran; Anjali Varadhan – Aruvi as Emily aka Jessica; Bhanupriya – Magalir Mattum as Rani Amirthakumari Gothandaraman; Urvashi – Magalir Mattum as Gomatha Silkurayappan; Varalaxmi Sarathkumar – Vikram Vedha as Chandra
Best Music Director	Best Lyricist
A. R. Rahman – Mersal; Anirudh Ravichander – Velaikkaran; Anirudh Ravichander – Vivegam; A. R. Rahman – Kaatru Veliyidai; D. Imman – Bogan	Vairamuthu – "Vaan" from Kaatru Veliyidai; Madhan Karky – "Azhagiye" from Kaatru Veliyidai; Madhan Karky – "Idhayame" from Velaikkaran; Vivek – "Aazhaporan" from Mersal; Vivek – "Neethane" from Mersal
Best Playback Singer – Male	Best Playback Singer – Female
Anirudh Ravichander – "Yaanji" from Vikram Vedha; A. R. Rahman – "Neethane" from Mersal; Arjun Chandy & Haricharan – "Azhagiye" from Kaatru Veliyidai; Sathyaprakash – "Nee Parkum" from Thiruttu Payale 2; Sid Sriram – "Macho" from Mersal	Shashaa Tirupati – "Vaan" from Kaatru Veliyidai; Luksimi Sivaneswaralingam – "Senthoora" from Bogan; Neeti Mohan – "Idhayame" from Velaikkaran; Swetha Mohan – "Macho" from Mersal; Shreya Ghoshal – "Neethane" from Mersal
Critics Best Actor	Critics Best Actress
Karthi – Theeran Adhigaaram Ondru as Theeran Thirumaaran; R. Madhavan – Vikram Vedha as Vikram	Aditi Balan – Aruvi as Aruvi

==== Telugu cinema ====
Best Film	Best Director
Baahubali 2: The Conclusion; Arjun Reddy; Fidaa; Gauthamiputra Satakarni; Ghazi; Sathamanam Bhavati	S. S. Rajamouli – Baahubali 2: The Conclusion; Krish – Gauthamiputra Satakarni; Sandeep Reddy Vanga – Arjun Reddy; Sankalp Reddy – Ghazi; Satish Vegesna – Sathamanam Bhavati; Sekhar Kammula – Fidaa
Best Actor	Best Actress
Vijay Deverakonda – Arjun Reddy as Arjun Reddy; Chiranjeevi – Khaidi No. 150 as Katthi Seenu; Jr NTR – Jai Lava Kusa as Jai/Ravana/Lava/Kusa; Nandamuri Balakrishna – Gauthamiputra Satakarni as Gautamiputra Satakarni; Prabhas – Baahubali 2: The Conclusion as Amarendra Baahubali and Mahendra Baahubali; Venkatesh – Guru as Aditya	Sai Pallavi – Fidaa as Bhanumathi; Anushka Shetty – Baahubali 2: The Conclusion as Devasena; Niveda Thomas – Ninnu Kori as Pallavi; Rakul Preet Singh – Rarandoi Veduka Chudham as Bramarambha; Ritika Singh – Guru as Rameswari
Best Supporting Actor	Best Supporting Actress
Rana Daggubati – Baahubali 2: The Conclusion as Bhallaladeva; Aadhi Pinisetty – Ninnu Kori as Arun; Prakash Raj – Sathamanam Bhavati as Raghavaraju; S. J. Suryah – Spyder as Bhairavadu; Sathyaraj – Baahubali 2: The Conclusion as Kattappa	Ramya Krishna – Baahubali 2: The Conclusion as Sivagami; Bhumika Chawla – Middle Class Abbayi as Jyothi; Catherine Tresa – Nene Raju Nene Mantri as Devika Rani; Jayasudha – Sathamanam Bhavati as Janakamma; Saranya Pradeep – Fidaa as Renuka
Best Music Director	Best Lyricist
M. M. Keeravani – Baahubali 2: The Conclusion; Anoop Rubens – Hello; Devi Sri Prasad – Duvvada Jagannadham; Devi Sri Prasad – Khaidi No. 150; Mickey J Meyer – Sathamanam Bhavati; Shaktikanth Karthick – Fidaa	M. M. Keeravani – "Dandaalayyaa" from Baahubali 2: The Conclusion; Chaithanya Pingali – "Oosupodhu" from Fidaa; Chandrabose – "Nuvvele Nuvvele" from Jai Janaki Nayaka; Chandrabose – "Ravana" from Jai Lava Kusa; Ramajogayya Sastry – "Sathamanam Bhavathi" from Sathamanam Bhavati; Shreshta – "Madhurame" from Arjun Reddy
Best Playback Singer – Male	Best Playback Singer – Female
Hemachandra – "Oosupodhu" from Fidaa; Anurag Kulkarni – "Mellaga Tellarindoi" from Sathamanam Bhavati; Armaan Malik– "Hello" from Hello; L. V. Revanth – "Teliseney Na Nuvvey" from Arjun Reddy; Sid Sriram – "Adiga Adiga" from Ninnu Kori	Madhu Priya – "Vachchinde" from Fidaa; Geetha Madhuri & M. M. Manasi – "Mahanubhavudu" from Mahanubhavudu; Neha Bhasin – "Swing Zara" from Jai Lava Kusa; Sameera Bharadwaj – "Madhurame" from Arjun Reddy; Sonu & Deepu – "Hamsa Naava" from Baahubali 2: The Conclusion
Critics Best Actor	Critics Best Actress
Venkatesh – Guru as Aditya	Ritika Singh – Guru as Rameswari

=== Technical Awards ===
Best Cinematographer
- K. K. Senthil Kumar (Telugu) – Baahubali 2: The Conclusion
Best Production Design
- Sabu Cyril (Telugu) – Baahubali 2: The Conclusion
Best Choreography
- Sekhar (Telugu) – "Ammadu Let Us Kummudu" from Khaidi No. 150 & "Vachchinde" from Fidaa

=== Special awards ===
Lifetime Achievement
- Kaikala Satyanarayana
Best Male Debut
- Vasanth Ravi (Tamil) for Taramani
- Antony Varghese (Malayalam) for Angamaly Diaries
Best Female Debut
- Kalyani Priyadarshan (Telugu) for Hello
- Aishwarya Lekshmi (Malayalam) for Njandukalude Nattil Oridavela

== Superlatives ==
=== Multiple nominations ===
- Kannada – Raajakumara – 5
- Malayalam – Mayaanadhi – 7
- Tamil – Mersal – 11
- Telugu – Baahubali 2: The Conclusion – 10

=== Multiple awards ===
- Kannada – Chowka – 3
- Malayalam – Thondimuthalum Driksakshiyum and Mayaanadhi – 4
- Tamil – Vikram Vedha – 4
- Telugu – Baahubali 2: The Conclusion – 8
