= Veyil =

Veyil (lit. 'sunlight') may refer to:

- Veyil (2006 film), Indian Tamil-language drama film
- Veyil (2022 film), Indian Malayalam-language drama film
