= Neha Nair =

Indian playback singer

- Born: Mumbai, India
- Occupation: Singer
- Years active: 2002–present
- Spouse: Yakzan Gary Pereira (m. 2013)

Neha Nair is an Indian playback singer and composer. Her debut was a duet with Job Kurian in the film Ritu, with music composed by Rahul Raj. She is a guest singer in the Malayalam rock band Avial.

== Personal life ==
She currently resides in Thiruvananthapuram with her Husband.

== Career ==
She was introduced by composer Rahul Raj with the song Cindrella, from the film Rithu. Her next break came through the song Premikkumbol from Salt N' Pepper, composed by Bijibal. She received the IMFA award for best female playback singer for the song. Her notable songs include Melle Kollum, Neeyo, Chillane from 22 Female Kottayam; Thaazhvaram, Nithya Sahaya Nathe from Thira; Mandarakatte, Kanadooram from 5 Sundarikal; Thithithara, Aarambathu from Second Show etc. She has also composed music for a few films like Iyobinte Pusthakam, Driving Licence, Under world, Nadikar, etc. with musician Yakzan Gary Pereira.

== Discography ==
=== As music composer ===
Year	Film	Songs	Score	Notes
2013	5 Sundarikal	Yes	Yes	Composed songs and score of 2 segments (Sethulakshmi and Aami) with Yakzan Gary Pereira
2014	Iyobinte Pusthakam	Yes	Yes	Co-composed with Yakzan Gary Pereira; Kerala State Film Award (Special Mention) for Music Direction
2017	Parava	No	Yes	Co-credited for score with Rex Vijayan, Sekhar Menon and Yakzan Gary Pereira
2017	Mayanadi	No	Yes	Co-credited for score with Rex Vijayan and Yakzan Gary Pereira
2018	Street Lights	No	Yes	Co-credited for score with Yakzan Gary Pereira
2018	Sudani from Nigeria	No	Yes	Co-credited for score with Rex Vijayan, Kishan Mohan and Yakzan Gary Pereira
2018	Humans of someone	Yes	No	1 song; Co-composed with Yakzan Gary Pereira
2019	Thamaasha	No	Yes	Co-credited for score with Rex Vijayan and Yakzan Gary Pereira
2019	Oru Njayarazhcha	Yes	No	1 song; Co-composed with Yakzan Gary Pereira
2019	Under world	Yes	Yes	Co-credited with Yakzan Gary Pereira
2019	Driving License	Yes	Yes	Co-credited with Yakzan Gary Pereira
2020	Halal Love Story	No	Yes	Co-credited with Yakzan Gary Pereira
2021	Love	Yes	Yes	Co-credited with Yakzan Gary Pereira
2021	Aarkkariyam	Yes	No	Co-credited with Yakzan Gary Pereira
2021	Tsunami	Yes	Yes	Co-credited with Yakzan Gary Pereira
2021	Sumesh&Ramesh	Yes	Yes	Co-credited with Yakzan Gary Pereira
2022	Naaradhan	No	Yes	Co-credited with Yakzan Gary Pereira
2022	Vaashi	No	Yes	Co-credited with Yakzan Gary Pereira
2022	1001 Nunakal	Yes	Yes	Co-credited with Yakzan Gary Pereira
2023	Momo in Dubai	Yes	Yes	Two songs and score, Co-credited with Yakzan Gary Pereira
2024	Nadikar	Yes	Yes	Co-credited with Yakzan Gary Pereira
2024	Rifle Club	No	Yes	Co-credited for score with Rex Vijayan and Yakzan Gary Pereira

=== As playback singer ===
Year	Song	Film	Co-singer(s)	Music director/ Composer
2009	Cindrella	Rithu	Job Kurian	Rahul Raj
2010	Swarnathin	Nirakazhcha	Vijay Yesudas	S. Jayakumar
2011	Premikkumpol	Salt N' Pepper	P Jayachandran	Bijibal
2011	Irul Nananju	Yakshi - Faithfully Yours	Sangeeth	Aravind Chandrasekhar
2011	Manjukaalam	Yakshi - Faithfully Yours		Aravind Chandrasekhar
2012	Melle Kollum	22 Female Kottayam	Job Kurien	Rex Vijayan
2012	Chillaane	22 Female Kottayam	Tony John	Avial
2012	Neeyo	22 Female Kottayam	Bijibal	Bijibal
2013	Shalabhamaayi	English		Rex Vijayan
2013	Nithya Sahaaya Naadhe	Thira		Shaan Rahman
2013	Thaazhvaaram	Thira	Hishaam Abdul Wahab	Shaan Rahman
2013	Annoru Naal	Kunthapura	Rahul Nambeesan	TK Vimal
2013	Kanmaniye	Kunthapura	Ranjin Raj Varma	TK Vimal
2013	Snehithane	Rose Guitarinaal		Shahabaz Aman
2013	Kaanaadooram	5 Sundarikal		Yakzan Gary Pereira
2013	Mandaarakkaatte	5 Sundarikal		Yakzan Gary Pereira
2014	Maane	Iyobinte Pusthakam	Anil Ram	Neha Nair&Yakzan Gary Pereira
2014	Raave	Iyobinte Pusthakam	Haricharan	Neha Nair&Yakzan Gary Pereira
2014	Aloshy Theme	Iyobinte Pusthakam		Neha Nair&Yakzan Gary Pereira
2014	Martha's Theme	Iyobinte Pusthakam		Neha Nair&Yakzan Gary Pereira
2014	Rawther Theme	Iyobinte Pusthakam		Neha Nair&Yakzan Gary Pereira
2014	Chemban Theme	Iyobinte Pusthakam		Neha Nair&Yakzan Gary Pereira
2014	Ennumen Karalile	8.20	Anoop Mohandas	Vidwan Band
2015	Pathukke Entho	Kanal		Ouseppachan
2017	Minnunnunde mulla pole	Tharangam		Aswin Renju
2017	Uyirin Nadhiye	Mayanadhi	Rex Vijayan	Rex Vijayan
2017	Kiliye	Mayanadhi		Rex Vijayan
2018	Ponnum kasavitta	Queen		Jakes Bejoy
2018	Kinav Kondu	Sudani From Nigeria	Rex Vijayan	Rex Vijayan
2018	Ranam Title Track	Ranam	Jakes Bejoy, Ajay Shravan	Jakes Bejoy
2018	Oduvile theeyayi	Varathan	Sushin Shyam	Sushin Shyam
2018	Nilapakshi - Happy Version	Maradona	Sushin Shyam	Sushin Shyam
2018	Nilapakshi - Sad Version	Maradona	Sushin Shyam	Sushin Shyam
2018	Hopelessly Yours	Humans of someone		Neha Nair&Yakzan Gary Pereira
2019	Parayuvaan	Ishq	Sid Sriram	Jakes Bejoy
2019	Arike Naam	Under World	Sachin Warrier, Remya Nambeesan	Neha Nair&Yakzan Gary Pereira
2019	Kaalavum Maari	Under World	Murali Gopi	Neha Nair&Yakzan Gary Pereira
2019	Paravakal	Under World	Sooraj Santhosh	Neha Nair&Yakzan Gary Pereira
2019	Masala Chaya	Thamaasha		Rex Vijayan
2020	Raat	Trance	Sneha Khanwalkar	Jackson Vijayan
2020	Yesuvinte	Trance		Jackson Vijayan
2020	Trance Title track	Trance	Lee	Vinayakan
2021	Sa Ma Ga Re Sa	Tsunami	Innocent, Mukesh, Suresh Krishna, Aju Varghese, Balu Varghese, Lal, Unni Karthikeyan	Neha Nair&Yakzan Gary Pereira, Innocent
2021	Aaraanu	Tsunami		Neha Nair&Yakzan Gary Pereira
2021	Kanvaathil	Roy	Rakhil Shoukath Ali Rajesh	Munna P. M.
2021	Pakaliravukalam	Kurup		Sushin Shyam
2021	Neeyum Njanum	Sumesh&Ramesh	Sangeeth	Neha Nair&Yakzan Gary Pereira
2021	Kinavil	Sumesh&Ramesh		Neha Nair&Yakzan Gary Pereira
2023	Nilavuthulli	Kunjamminis Hospital	Arvind Venugopal	Ranjin Raj
2024	Nayattu Prarthana	Rifle Club	Rex Vijayan	Rex Vijayan

=== As lyricist ===
- Kaanaa Dooram - 5 Sundarikal

== Awards ==
- 2015 - Kerala State Film Award – Special Mention for Iyobinte Pusthakam
