= Anwar Ali (poet) =

Indian poet

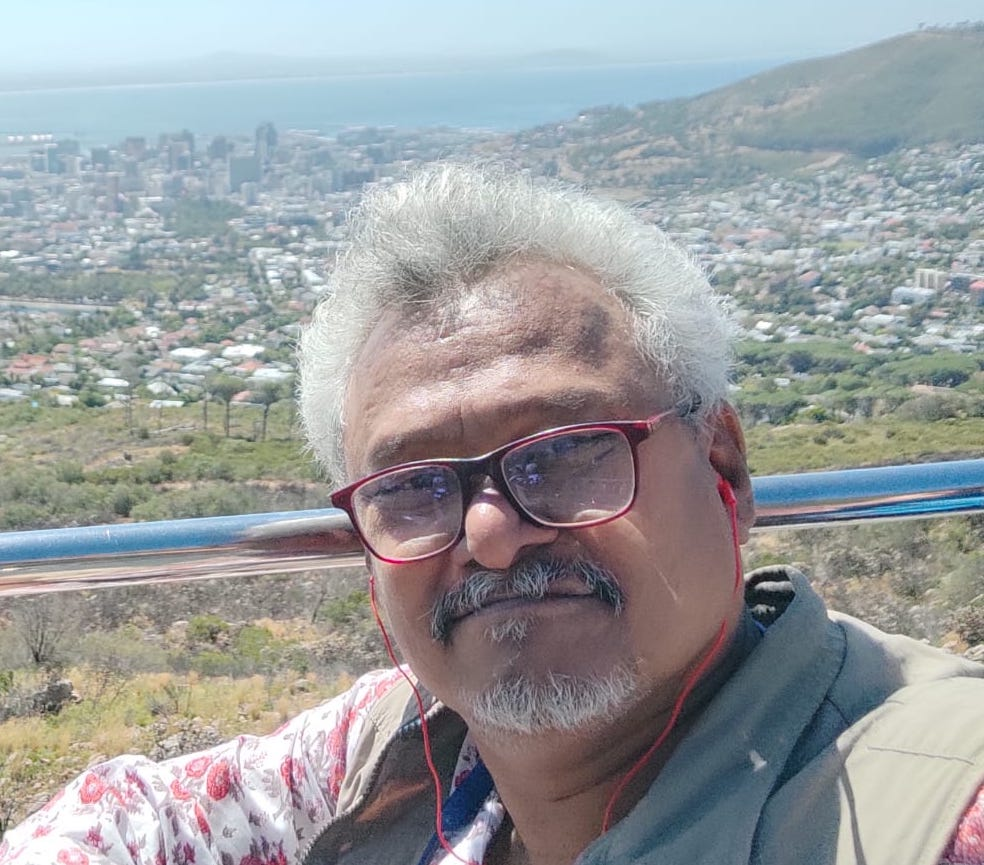
- Born: Anvar Ali; 1 July 1966 (age 60); Thiruvananthapuram, Kerala, India
- Occupations: Writer, Poet, Lyricist
- Spouse: Najumul Shahi (Ambili)
- Children: 2
- Writing career
- Notable work: Mazhakkalam
- Notable awards: Kerala State Film Award for Best Screenplay (2003); Kerala State Film Award for Best Lyricist (2020), Kerala Sahitya Akademi Award for Poetry in 2021 for Mehaboob Express.

Anwar Ali (born 1 July 1966), also known Anvar Ali, is an Indian poet and lyricist writing in Malayalam. He is also a literary editor and critic, translator, screenwriter, and documentary filmmaker.

== Career ==
=== Literature ===
Anvar Ali's first collection of poems, Mazhakkalam (The Rainy Season, 1999), established him as a prominent voice in contemporary Malayalam poetry. Ali's poetry collections include Aadiyaadi Alanja Marangale (Ye Trees, Swaying Ramblers, 2009) and Mehaboob Express (2020). Eternal Sculptures (2007) is a collection of his poems in English translation. His novella, Njan Rappai, was published in 1995.

Ali's poems have been translated into various Indian and foreign languages and have been included in several anthologies of contemporary poetry, such as Innan Ganges flyter in i natten (A Swedish Anthology of Indian Poetry in Hindi, Malayalam and English, edited by Tomas Lofstrom and Birgitta Wallin); Singing in the Dark - A Global Anthology of Poetry Under Lockdown (edited by K. Satchidanandan and Nishi Chawla); Oxford India Anthology of Modern Malayalam Literature, Volume 1 (edited by P. P. Raveendran and GS Jayasree); and The Tree of Tongues (edited by E V Ramakrishnan).

Ali translated Totto-Chan: The Little Girl at the Window, the Japanese autobiographical memoir of Tetsuko Kuroyanagi – a literary classic, into Malayalam in 1994. He co-translated Sirpi Balasubramaniam’s poetry collection Oru Gramathile Nadi (A River in a Village, 2010). He has translated a series of modern Anglophone African poems and poems from Indian languages like Tamil, Hindi, Kannada, and Assamese into Malayalam.

On Anvar Ali’s contribution to Malayalam poetry, his friend and fellow poet Anitha Thampi has highlighted Ali’s unique exploration and transformation of the language of poetry in Malayalam. Further, Amrith Lal of The New Indian Express, a cultural columnist and critic, observes, "Ali has carried forward the poetic language, constantly experimenting with its structures, drawing from Malayalam’s rich inheritance of story-telling and narrative poetry, the careful moulding of poetic metres, cross-fertilisation of the vocabulary by borrowing from popular culture, street talk and community lingo, using classical modes as well as parody, leaning on cinema and performance traditions to energise the art."

=== Other works ===
Anvar Ali has notably experimented with the performance of his poetry. In 2015–2017, he created a poetry band, Leaves of Grass, with guitarist and composer John P. Varkey. The band's performances combined the stylistic aspects of performance poetry with rock music.

In 2018, he collaborated with Olam, an instrumental band, to perform Mehboob Express, a long narrative poem that has gained acclaim as a chronological, sociocultural saga and critique of Indian politics. In 2017, in the maiden show at Uru Art Harbour, Mattancherry, curated by artist Riyas Komu, Ali showcased the living culture around legendary Mattancherry singer Mehboob (singer) through an audio-visual installation . Produced under the banner of Image Commune (2015), Ali's debut documentary film on Attoor Ravi Varma, Maruvili (Call from the other Shore), was selected for the International Documentary and Short Film Festival of Kerala (2015); Mumbai International Film Festival (2016); Jaffna International Film Festival, Sri Lanka (2016); and SIGNS Festival of Federation of Film Societies of India, Kerala (2015).

He co-wrote the screenplay of Margam (2003), an acclaimed Malayalam feature film, and co-directed a documentary series on the history of Malayalam cinema for Kerala State Film Development Corporation. He contributed to Shasthra Kouthukam, a science programme that aired in Doordarshan between 1991 and 1995, on behalf of the Centre for Development of Imaging Technology.

Ali co-edited the journals Pakshikkoottam (Flock of Birds), an alternate journal and publishing house, and Kavithakku Oru Idam (A Space for Poetry), a journal for new poetry in Malayalam. He was the chief content editor of Seventy-Five Years of Malayalam Cinema, a digital encyclopaedia produced by Kerala State Chalachitra Academy (2003).

Ali was invited to South Korea for the Writer-in-Residence Program of the Literature Translation Institute of Korea in 2007 and attended the 2007 Afro-Asian Literature Festival in Jeonju, Korea. He has presented his work in various poetry, literary, and film festivals, including Young Poets Meet, New Delhi (1997); The New Voices, Trivandrum (2004); Asselieh Film Festival, Morocco (2004); Kavi Bharati, Bhopal (2005); Paju Book Festival, South Korea (2014); Sharjah International Book Fair (2014 & 2018); Bharatiya Kavita Samaroh, Patna (2014); Samanvay: IHC Indian Languages' Festival, New Delhi (2014); Jaffna International Film Festival, Sri Lanka (2016); and Kokrajhar Literary Festival, Bodoland, Assam (2021).

Ali's distinctive poetic idiom illuminates the lyrics of Annayum Rasoolum (2013), one among the films that brought a paradigm shift in Malayalam cinema. In his subsequent work, he has continued to experiment with fresh and bold poetic imagery and style, thus treading away from tradition and gaining much popularity among young audiences and filmmakers. Some of his notable works include Njan Steve Lopez (2014), Kammatipaadam (2016), Kismath (2016), Mayaanadhi (2017), Eeda (2018), Thottappan (2019), Kumbalangi Nights (2019), Nayattu (2021 film) (2020), Bhoomiyile Manohara Swakaryam (2020), Malik (film) (2021), and Oru Thekkan Thallu Case (2022).

== Awards ==
=== Literary awards ===
- 1992- Kunchu Pillai Award
- 2000- Kanakasree Endowment Award of Kerala Sahitya Akademi
- 2021- Kerala Sahitya Akademi Award for Poetry for Mehaboob Express.

=== Film awards for lyrics ===
	Award	Song	Notes
2018	65th Filmfare Awards South-Best Lyricist	"Mizhiyil Ninnum" (Mayanadi)	
2019	CPC Cine Awards - Best Original Song	"Cherathukal" (Kumbalangi Nights)	Award shared with Sushin Shyam and Sithara Krishnakumar
2020	Kerala State Film Award for Best Lyricist	Smaranakal Kaadayi (Bhoomiyile Manohara Swakaryam)	
2020	Kerala State Film Award for Best Lyricist	"Theerame Theerame" (Malik)	
2024	69th Filmfare Awards South-Best Lyricist	"Ennum En Kaaval" (Kaathal – The Core)	

=== Other awards ===
- Kerala State Film Award for Best Screenplay (2003): Margam
- The South-South Film Encounter, Morocco (2003) - Best Screenplay: Margam
- Fajr International Film Festival (2003) - Best Screenplay: Margam
- SIGNS Festival - Best Biopic Award (2015): Maruvili

== Literary works ==
- 1994 – Janalakkarikile Penkutty (Translation of Totto-Chan: The Little Girl at the Window )
- 1995 – Njan Rappai (Novella)
- 1999 – Mazhakkalam (Poems)
- 2007– Eternal Sculptures(Poetry Collection in English)
- 2009 – Aadiyaadi Alanja Marangale (Poems)
- 2010 – Oru Gramathile Nadi (Translation of Poetry Collection by Sirpi Balasubramaniam)
- 2025 – Gaandhithodalmaala (Poetry Collection)

== As lyricist ==
=== Film songs ===
Year	Song(s)	Title	Notes
2013	"Kando Kando"	Annayum Rasoolum	
2013	"Vazhivakkil"	Annayum Rasoolum	
2013	"Aaru Ninte Naavikan"	Annayum Rasoolum	
2014	"Theruvukal Nee"	Njan Steve Lopez	
2014	"Ooraake Kalapila"	Njan Steve Lopez	
2014	"Chirakukal Njan Nee Dooramaay"	Njan Steve Lopez	
2014	"Muthu Penne" (Research)	Njan Steve Lopez	
2014	"Ulakam Vayalaakki"	Jalamsham	
2016	"Para Para"	Kammatipaadam	
2016	"Kaathirunna Pakshi Njaan"	Kammatipaadam	
2016	"Puzhu Pulikal"	Kammatipaadam	
2016	"Kisa Paathiyil"	Kismath	
2016	"Chilathunaam"	Kismath	
2016	"Vinnu Churanna"	Kismath	
2017	"Lokam Ennum"	Sakhavu	
2017	"Mizhiyil Ninnum"	Mayaanadhi	
2017	"Thambiran"	Ezra	
2018	"Swapnam Swapnam"	Padayottam	
2018	"Marivil"	Eeda	
2018	"Udalin"	Eeda	
2018	"Mizhi Niranju"	Eeda	
2018	"Kinavu Kondoru"	Sudani from Nigeria	
2018	"Plathoore Sivantambalathin"	Kuttanpillayude Sivarathri	
2019	"Uyirullavaram"	Valiyaperunnal	
2019	"Thazhvarangal"	Valiyaperunnal	
2019	"Pranthan Kandalinl"	Thottappan	
2019	"Cherathukal"	Kumbalangi Nights	
2019	"Uyirilthodum"	Kumbalangi Nights	
2019	"Kurumali Puzhel"	Pengalila	
2020	"Smaranakal Kaadaayi"	Bhoomiyile Manohara Swakaryam	
2020	"Muttathu"	Halal Love Story	
2021	"Odiyodippoya"	Vishudha Rathrikal	
2021	"Chiramabhayamee"	Aarkkariyam	
2021	"Doore Maari"	Aarkkariyam	
2021	"Kinarilu"	Aarkkariyam	
2021	"Appalaale"	Nayattu	
2021	"Odiyodippoya"	Vishudha Rathrikal	
2021	"Theerame Theerame"	Mālik	
2021	"Aaraarum Kaanaathe"	Mālik	
2021	"Pakaliravukal"	Kurup	
2022	"Arike Varathe"	Kuttavum Shikshayum	
2022	"Badarile"	19(1)(a)	
2022	"Paravakal"	19(1)(a)	
2022	"Yentharu"	Oru Thekkan Thallu Case	
2022	"Prema Neyyappam"	Oru Thekkan Thallu Case	
2022	"Paathirayil"	Oru Thekkan Thallu Case	
2022	"Mazhappattu"	Padavettu	
2022	"Maloor Thottam"	Padavettu	
2022	"Panju Panju"	Padavettu	
2022	"Public Veedu"	Padavettu	
2022	"Padarvalli"	Padavettu	
2022	"Kodum Ravil"	Veyil	
2022	"Chaayum Veyil"	Saudi Vellakka	
2022	"Oro Manavum"	1001 Nunakal	
2023	"Etho Vaathil"	Djinn	
2023	"Thaaraattayi"	Iratta	
2023	"Devi Neeye"	Thankam	
2023	"Vichara Mazha"	Thankam	
2023	"Adam Mala"	Thuramukham	
2023	"Karakkenne"	Thuramukham	
2023	"Maravi"	Thuramukham	
2023	"Koorambay"	Garudan	
2023	"Paathakal"	Vela	
2023	"Bambadiyo"	Vela	
2023	"Chathayadina Paatu"	Maharani	
2024	"Nebulakal" (Travel Song)	Manjummel Boys	
2024	"Aalunnu Neeye"	Rifle Club	
2025	"Thalarathe"	Identity	
2026	"Thaakkol"	Balan: The Boy	
2026	"Engotta"	Balan: The Boy	

=== Non-film songs ===
Year	Title	Language	Music	Singer
2020	Manassinte Madrassayil	Malayalam	Shahabaz Aman	Shahabaz Aman
2022	The death-walk song/ Chavunadappattu	Malayalam	Dawn Vincent	John P. Varkey
2023	Avale nee kanduvo	Malayalam	Muhsin kurikkal	Nisa Azeezi
