= Mayaanadhi =

2017 film directed by Aashiq Abu

- Theatrical release poster
- Directed by: Aashiq Abu
- Written by: Syam Pushkaran; Dileesh Nair
- Produced by: Aashiq Abu; Santhosh T. Kuruvilla
- Starring: Tovino Thomas; Aishwarya Lekshmi
- Cinematography: Jayesh Mohan
- Edited by: Saiju Sreedharan
- Music by: Rex Vijayan
- Production companies: Dream Mill Cinemas and Entertainments; Moonshot Entertainment
- Distributed by: OPM Dream Mill Cinemas
- Release date: 22 December 2017
- Running time: 136 minutes
- Country: India
- Language: Malayalam

Mayaanadhi (transl. Mystic River) is a 2017 Indian Malayalam-language romantic thriller film directed and co-produced by Aashiq Abu, and written by Syam Pushkaran and Dileesh Nair. The film stars Tovino Thomas as a criminal on the run and Aishwarya Lekshmi as an aspiring actress. Their troubled love and struggle for survival form the basic plot of the film. It released on 22 December 2017 to widespread critical acclaim from critics. The film was praised for the way it tackled with sexuality and was included in The Hindu 's top 25 Malayalam films of the decade.

The plot was inspired by the 1960 French film Breathless.

== Plot ==
John Mathew a.k.a. Maathan is an orphan, living as a thug. He participates in an undercover deal on behalf of his boss, who is busy with his daughter's schooling. Maathan convinces his group that their boss is intentionally pulling out of the deal due to the risk involved. However, they reach the hotel without any issue. While Maathan is taking a bath, three police officers disguised as civilians enter the rooms and kill the accompanying three gang members. Maathan hides in the tub, and during his escape, he accidentally kills an officer. He reaches Kochi and moves in with his ex-boss and longtime friend Shaji.

Maathan intends to settle abroad with his ex-girlfriend "Appu" Aparna, who is an aspiring actress and is auditioning for a role. In this, she is helped by her ex-roommate Sameera, who is now a successful actress. Aparna is also making a livelihood as an anchor for parties and other events. Maathan suggests his plans to settle abroad using the money that he got from the deal. However, she refuses to move out with him as she believes that Maathan has stolen the money. She gets an offer for an ad shoot and travels to Kasaragod. Maathan accompanies her on the trip.

Maathan's boss is taken into custody, and he provides details on Maathan. He asks the officers to kill him and keep the looted money for themselves. The police learn that he is in contact with a woman. They find her at a mall in Kochi, and an officer introduces himself as Maathan's classmate, enquiring about his whereabouts. Aparna denies being in contact with him, and Maathan eavesdrops on the conversation. Later, Shaji asks him to leave his home. Planning to have a final word with Aparna, he meets her at Sameera's apartment. When Aparna makes it clear that she plans to pursue her acting career, Maathan decides to move on.

Aparna is interrogated by the police at a diner, and she reveals being in contact with Maathan. Aparna calls Maathan and asks him to meet her, where he is caught. But the policemen intend to kill him rather than taking him to court. Maathan tries convincing one officer to no avail. He is taken to a forest, and the officer lies to him that Aparna plotted the call intending him to be caught. Maathan replies that she was right in doing so and says that he loves her very much. He is then shot by one of the policemen and succumbs to his wounds. The last scene, set some time in the future, shows Aparna, oblivious to Maathan's death, getting her first shot as an actress and waiting for her first film, still living with a hope that Maathan will come back.

== Cast ==
- Tovino Thomas as John Mathew aka Maathan
- Aishwarya Lekshmi as Aparna Ravi aka Appu
- Leona Lishoy as Sameera
- Harish Uthaman as Harish
- Ilavarasu as Police Inspector
- Jayakumar as Senthil
- Nizhalgal Ravi as Police Inspector
- Darshana Rajendran as Darshana
- Maya Menon as Vasumathi
- Unnimaya Prasad as Assistant Director
- Khalid Rahman as Assistant Director
- Meesai Rajendran as Xerox Murugan
- Lijo Jose Pellissery as Director Len Prasad (Extended Cameo)
- Basil Joseph as Director Jinu (Cameo)
- Soubin Shahir as Sameera's brother (Cameo)
- Aparna Balamurali as herself (Cameo)
- Shine Tom Chacko (Cameo)
- Sushin Shyam (cameo)
- Rajesh Madhavan as Director's assistant (cameo)

== Production ==
The film is jointly scripted by Dileesh Nair and Syam Pushkaran both of whom have previously associated with Aashiq Abu in several films. The seed for the film came from director-cinematographer Amal Neerad, a friend of Aashiq and Syam. Neerad narrated in one of their meetings something that he had heard while living in Bombay. Neerad himself had initially wanted to direct the story for his short film in the 5 Sundarikal anthology. But later he put it on hold and proceeded with another script. Syam adapted Neerad's story to a more familiar surrounding for Mayaanadhi.

Tovino Thomas was announced as the male lead for the film in February 2017. Aashiq wanted to cast a new face as the female lead and model-turned-actress Aishwarya Lekshmi was selected through audition. Aishwarya had already debuted in films early in the year playing the female lead in Njandukalude Nattil Oridavela. According to Aishwarya she never had to put any extra effort for portraying the role as the director and script writers would brief situations well. Cast includes Aparna Balamurali and Leona Lishoy.

The shooting of the film started in May 2017. The first schedule was shot in Madurai and Kodaikanal and the second leg of shooting was completed in Kochi. Other locations include Bekal and Dhanushkodi.

== Influences ==
Some critics have pointed out the film's plot similarities with the 1960 French film Breathless, written and directed by Jean-Luc Godard, which is about a wandering criminal (Jean-Paul Belmondo) and his American girlfriend (Jean Seberg). During the script development stage, Aashiq Abu had revealed that films like Breathless were a reference to Mayaanadhi. An article from International Business Times states: "Even though Mayaanadhi owes a great deal of its plot structure to Breathless, Aashiq Abu transforms and elevates the movie to a different level. He breaths fresh air and life into his protagonists, Maathan and Appu, and they stay with the viewers even after the movie's touching climax scene."

== Release ==
The film released in Kerala on 22 December 2017. It released on Blu-ray on 26 September 2018.

== Reception ==
=== Critical response ===
Upon release, it received wide critical acclaim from various film critics and was voted among the best Malayalam films of the year by The Hindu, The Indian Express, and International Business Times.

G. Raghesh of Malayala Manorama has written that Aashiq Abu's craftsmanship as a filmmaker makes 'Mayaanadhi' a neatly narrated love story that has some of the most beautiful romantic moments Malayalam cinema has ever produced. Sudhi C. J. from the same newspaper wrote: "Mayaanadhi tugs at the heartstrings of viewers with the cinematic brilliance and excellence in craft displayed by Aashiq Abu, setting it apart from other contemporary films, most of which fail to leave an impression – of either sadness, happiness or thought – on the audience."

Sanjith Sidhardhan of The Times of India has rated the film 3.5 of 5 stars and written that Aashiq Abu's 'Mayaanadhi' is a movie telling an intense story of urban characters without any superficiality. It's also a fine example on how two well fleshed out characters can take forward a film all on their own. Neelima Mohan of The News Minute has written that 'Mayaanadhi' is a modern romance with all its trappings—yet the intensity cannot be more searing which inverts traditional ideas of romance. S. R. Praveen of The Hindu said that 'Mayaanadhi' is Aashiq Abu's best yet and movie is a quite an absorbing watch. The movie is a Magic of love, life, and all in between. Aditya Shrikrishna of The New Indian Express wrote: "There is something about Mayaanadhi, Ashiq Abu's new Malayalam film, that is as mystical as its title. The film seemingly gravitates between genres but keeps the tone intact. Mayaanadhi's gaze, most sensitive gaze of all, doesn't flinch. Two threads run in parallel, a manhunt widening in real time and a lived relationship uncovering its past. Never a false moment in its 136-minute run, Mayaanadhi begins like a thriller, sways into romance territory, and keeps jumping timelines and genres at will."

News and entertainment portal Sify has written that 'Mayaanadhi is the kind of film that goes straight into your heart and provides a variety of emotions. It's romantic, funny and moving. It's the kind of honest and realistic movie that is not to be missed. Abhijith from online entertainment portal Filmibeat.com has reviewed that 'Mayaanadhi' is pre-dominantly a love story and at the same time, it has some thrilling elements in it. Aashiq Abu has successfully switched sequences between these two different genres and never ever one would feel a mismatch. He has rated the movie 4 of 5. Anna MM Vetticad from media portal Firstpost has written that in 'Mayaanadhi' Aishwarya Lekshmi, Tovino Thomas headline the romance of the year from Mollywood. She has stated that 'Mayaanadhi' has its fine balance between being relatable and yet being an epic romance. It is a befitting December release in a year that has witnessed some great works from Malayalam cinema and has rated the movie 4 of 5.

Rating the film 4 in a scale of 5, film critic Baradwaj Rangan wrote: "We've seen many falling-in-love films, many falling-out-of-love films. This is a being-in-love film, with all the passions and problems the term suggests." Another critic Veeyen in a brilliant tribute to the film, states that "In ‘Mayaanadhi, director Aashiq Abu, armed with a dexterously penned screenplay, settles down to sensitively sketch a doomed tale of love. An impeccable reconstruction of an age-old narrative in an untested realistic setting, ‘Mayanadhi’ is the kind of film that holds a depth of meanings in those abstract gazes, a profundity of emotions in those unuttered words, and which leaves an inexplicable, seething sting at the upshot of it all."

== Soundtrack ==
The film's soundtrack was composed, programmed and arranged by Rex Vijayan. Vijayan, along with Yakzan Gary Pereira and Neha Nair produced the background score of the film. Shahabaz Aman won the Kerala State Film Award for Best Singer for the rendition of the song "Mizhiyil Ninnum".

Mayaanadhi

Soundtrack album by Rex Vijayan
- Released: 2 January 2018
- Genre: Feature film soundtrack
- Length: 42:56
- Label: OPM Records
- Producer: Rex Vijayan

Rex Vijayan chronology
Parava (2017)	Mayaanadhi (2018)	Sudani from Nigeria (2018)
External audio
- Audio Jukebox on YouTube

Mayaanadhi (Original Motion Picture Soundtrack)
No.	Title	Lyrics	Singer(s)	Length
1.	"Remembering Appu"			1:08
2.	"Escape and Accident"			2:35
3.	"Kiliye"	Rafeeq Ahammed	Neha Nair	4:10
4.	"Mathan and Appu Meet"			0:53
5.	"Uyirin Nadhiye"	Vinayak Sasikumar	Rex Vijayan, Neha Nair	4:30
6.	"Mathan Theme"			1:14
7.	"Kaattil"	Vinayak Sasikumar	Shahabaz Aman	5:39
8.	"Appu's Audition"			1:57
9.	"A Walk To Remember"			0:37
10.	"Mizhiyil Ninnum"	Anwar Ali	Shahabaz Aman	3:58
11.	"The Police"			1:28
12.	"Mathan In Trouble"			1:35
13.	"Lift Fight"			1:54
14.	"Rejection"			0:41
15.	"The Surrender"			2:28
16.	"The Encounter"			2:45
17.	"Mayaanadhi"	Anwar Ali	Shahabaz Aman	4:22
18.	"Trailer"			2:02

== Accolades ==
Award (Note: Awards, festivals and organisations are in alphabetical order.)	Date of ceremony (Note: Date is linked to the article about the awards held that year, wherever possible.)	Category	Recipient(s)	Result	Ref.
Asianet Film Awards	20 May 2018	Best Performer of the Year	Tovino Thomas (Note: Also for Ezra, Godha, Oru Mexican Aparatha, Tharangam)	Won	
Asianet Film Awards	20 May 2018	Best New Face – Female	Aishwarya Lekshmi (Note: Also for Njandukalude Nattil Oridavela)	Won	
Asianet Film Awards	20 May 2018	Best Male Playback Singer	Shahabaz Aman – (for "Mizhiyil Ninnum")	Won	
CPC Cine Awards	18 February 2018	Best Music Director	Rex Vijayan (Note: Also for Parava)	Won	
Filmfare Awards South	16 June 2018	Best Film – Malayalam	Mayaanadhi – Dream Mill Cinemas and Entertainments, Moonshot Entertainment	Nominated	
Filmfare Awards South	16 June 2018	Best Director – Malayalam	Aashiq Abu	Nominated	
Filmfare Awards South	16 June 2018	Best Actor – Malayalam	Tovino Thomas	Nominated	
Filmfare Awards South	16 June 2018	Critics Best Actor – Malayalam	Tovino Thomas	Won	
Filmfare Awards South	16 June 2018	Best Actress – Malayalam	Aishwarya Lekshmi	Nominated	
Filmfare Awards South	16 June 2018	Best Music Director – Malayalam	Rex Vijayan	Won	
Filmfare Awards South	16 June 2018	Best Lyricist – Malayalam	Anwar Ali – (for "Mizhiyil Ninnum")	Won	
Filmfare Awards South	16 June 2018	Best Male Playback Singer – Malayalam	Shahabaz Aman – (for "Mizhiyil Ninnum")	Won	
Indywood Academy Awards	1–5 December 2018	Best Music Director	Rex Vijayan	Won	
Kerala Film Critics Association Awards	21 April 2018	Second Best Actor	Tovino Thomas	Won	
Kerala Film Critics Association Awards	21 April 2018	Second Best Actress	Aishwarya Lekshmi	Won	
Kerala State Film Awards	8 March 2018	Best Singer	Shahabaz Aman – (for "Mizhiyil Ninnum")	Won	
Mazhavil Mango Music Awards	7 August 2018	Best Music Director	Rex Vijayan – (for "Mizhiyil Ninnum")	Won	
Mazhavil Mango Music Awards	7 August 2018	Best Lyricist	Anwar Ali – (for "Mizhiyil Ninnum")	Won	
Movie Street Excellence Awards	5 February 2018	Best Screenplay	Syam Pushkaran, Dileesh Nair	Won	
Movie Street Excellence Awards	5 February 2018	Best Actress	Aishwarya Lekshmi	Won	
Movie Street Excellence Awards	5 February 2018	Best Music Director	Rex Vijayan	Won	
Movie Street Excellence Awards	5 February 2018	Best Male Playback Singer	Shahabaz Aman – (for "Mizhiyil Ninnum")	Won	
North American Film Awards	7 May 2018	Second Best Film	Mayaanadhi – Dream Mill Cinemas and Entertainments, Moonshot Entertainment	Won	
North American Film Awards	7 May 2018	Best Script	Syam Pushkaran, Dileesh Nair	Won	
Padmarajan Award	23 May 2018	Best Film	Director: Aashiq Abu; Writers: Syam Pushkaran, Dileesh Nair	Won	
South Indian International Movie Awards	14–15 September 2018	Best Film – Malayalam	Mayaanadhi – Dream Mill Cinemas and Entertainments, Moonshot Entertainment	Nominated	
South Indian International Movie Awards	14–15 September 2018	Best Director – Malayalam	Aashiq Abu	Nominated	
South Indian International Movie Awards	14–15 September 2018	Best Actor – Malayalam	Tovino Thomas	Nominated	
South Indian International Movie Awards	14–15 September 2018	Best Actress – Malayalam	Aishwarya Lekshmi	Nominated	
South Indian International Movie Awards	14–15 September 2018	Critics Award for Best Actress – Malayalam	Aishwarya Lekshmi	Won	
South Indian International Movie Awards	14–15 September 2018	Best Lyricist – Malayalam	Anwar Ali – (for "Mizhiyil Ninnum")	Nominated	
South Indian International Movie Awards	14–15 September 2018	Best Male Playback Singer – Malayalam	Shahabaz Aman – (for "Mizhiyil Ninnum")	Nominated	
Vanitha Film Awards	25 February 2018	Best Script Writer	Syam Pushkaran, Dileesh Nair	Won	
Vanitha Film Awards	25 February 2018	Best Romantic Hero	Tovino Thomas	Won	
Vanitha Film Awards	25 February 2018	Best Romantic Heroine	Aishwarya Lekshmi	Won	
