= Filmfare Award for Best Lyricist – Malayalam =

Indian annual film award

The Filmfare Award for Best Lyricist – Malayalam is given by the Filmfare magazine as part of its annual Filmfare Awards South for Malayalam films.

== Superlatives ==
Superlative	Lyricist	Record
Most wins	Rafeeq Ahmed	4

== Winners ==
Here is a list of the award winners and the songs and films they won for.

Year	Lyricist	Film	Ref
2024	Rafeeq Ahamed	Aadujeevitham ("Periyone")
2023	Anwar Ali	Kaathal – The Core ("Ennum En Kaaval")
2022	Arun Alat	Hridayam ("Darshana")
2020–2021	Rafeeq Ahamed	Ayyappanum Koshiyum ("Ariyathariyathe")
2019	AWARDS FUNCTION WAS SUSPENDED DUE TO COVID-19 PANDEMIC
2018	B. K. Harinarayanan	Theevandi ("Jeevamshamayi")
2017	Anwar Ali	Mayanadhi ("Mizhiyil Ninnu Mizhiyilekku")
2016	Madhu Vasudevan	Oppam ("Chinnamma")
2015	Rafeeq Ahamed	Ennu Ninte Moideen ("Kaathirunnu Kaathirunnu")
2014	B. K. Harinarayanan	1983 ("Olanjali Kuruvi")
2013	Madhu Vasudevan	Nadan ("Ottakku Paadunna")
2012	Rafeeq Ahamed	Spirit ("Maranamethunna Nerathu")
2011	O. N. V. Kurup	Pranayam
2010	Rafeeque Ahmed	Anwar
2009	O. N. V. Kurup	Pazhassi Raja
