= Ajay Menon =

Indian cinematographer (born 1983)

- Born: 27 July 1983 (age 42); Palakkad, Kerala
- Occupations: Cinematographer, producer, photographer
- Years active: 2008–present

Ajay Menon is an Indian film cinematographer, producer, and photographer who works in Malayalam films. Ajay made his debut as cinematographer with Halal Love Story (2020).

== Papaya Media ==
Ajay Menon is associating with Papaya media, which is a film production company based in Kochi, Kerala, and Cafe Papaya, a restaurant in Kochi.

== Filmography ==
=== As cinematographer ===
Year	Film	Notes	Director
2020	Halal Love Story	Debut film	Zakariya Mohammed
