= Shane Nigam =

Indian film actor

- Born: 21 December 1995 (age 30); Kochi, Kerala, India
- Occupation: Actor
- Years active: 2010 (child artist); 2013–present
- Father: Kalabhavan Abi

Shane Nigam is an Indian actor who appears in Malayalam films. Having made his debut in the 2010 film Thanthonni, he was part of successful films including Parava (2017), Kumbalangi Nights (2019), and RDX: Robert Dony Xavier (2023).

== Early life ==
Shane was born as eldest among three children, to mimicry actor Kalabhavan Abi and Sunila, in Elamakkara, Kochi, Kerala. He did his schooling from Bhavans Vidya Mandir, Elamakkara. He pursued engineering at Rajagiri School of Engineering & Technology, Kochi. He has two younger sisters, Ahana and Aleena.

== Career ==
Nigam made his acting debut with the film Thanthonni, later Neelakasham Pachakadal Chuvanna Bhoomi, also in Annayum Rasoolum for portraying the role of Anna's brother.

He made his debut as a lead actor in 2016 film, Kismath opposite Shruthy Menon.

Nigam played a central character alongside veteran actors Amala and Manju Warrier in the 2017 film C/O Saira Banu. The following year, he appeared in the romantic film Eeda which was also praised by critics.

Nigam starred in two films in 2019; the comedy-drama Kumbalangi Nights, which was highly successful on box office and received rave reviews from film critics and the romantic thriller Ishq.

== Controversies ==
=== Interruptions in production ===
==== Veyil production dispute ====
In 2019, Nigam became involved in a dispute with film producer Joby George during the production of Veyil. The conflict gained public attention after Nigam alleged through a Facebook Live video that he had received threats from the producer. The issue was later addressed through mediation involving the Association of Malayalam Movie Artists (AMMA). Subsequently, a separate controversy arose when Nigam altered his hairstyle during the film's production, leading to disagreements with the producers and criticism from sections of the film industry.

==== RDX ====
During the production of RDX, reports emerged of a disagreement between Nigam and the film's producers regarding the prominence of his character in the film. According to media reports, Nigam temporarily left the production, resulting in delays and criticism from sections of the film industry. The incident attracted media attention and prompted discussions regarding professional conduct and contractual obligations in the Malayalam film industry.

=== Political and social views ===
Nigam publicly expressed support for the "All Eyes on Rafah" campaign through social media. He also described himself as a "Sudapi from India" in an Instagram Story, a statement that generated discussion online.

== Filmography ==
Key
†	Denotes films that have not yet been released

Year	Title	Role(s)	Notes	Ref.
2010	Thanthonni	Young Kochukunju	Child artist	
2010	Anwar	Boy in the booth	Child artist	
2013	Annayum Rasoolum	Kunjumon		
2013	Neelakasham Pachakadal Chuvanna Bhoomi	Shyam		
2014	Balyakalasakhi	Young Majeed		
2016	Kammatipaadam	Sunny		
2016	Kismath	Irfan		
2017	C/O Saira Banu	Joshua Peter		
2017	Parava	Shane		
2018	Eeda	Anand		
2019	Kumbalangi Nights	Bobby		
2019	Ishq	Sachi		
2019	Oolu	Vasu		
2019	Valiyaperunnal	Akkar		
2022	Bhoothakaalam	Vinu	SonyLIV film	
2022	Veyil	Sidharth (Sid)		
2022	Ullasam	Harry Menon		
2023	Corona Papers	SI Rahul Nambiar		
2023	RDX	Robert		
2023	Vela	CPO Ullas Augustin		
2024	Little Hearts	Sibi		
2025	Madraskaaran	Sathya	Tamil film	
2025	Balti	Udhayan / Balti	Malayalam-Tamil bilingual film	
2025	Haal	Asif Kadalundi		
2026	Dridam	Vijay Radhakrishnan		
TBA	Bermuda †	TBA	Delayed	
TBA	Aayirathonnam Ravu †	TBA	Filming	

== Television ==
Year	Program	Role	Channel	Notes
2005	Bullet Bava	Uncredited role	Surya TV	
2005	Gulumal Bhai	Uncredited role	Kairali TV	
2007	Super Dancer Junior	Contestant	Amrita TV	
2007–2008	Hello Kuttichathan	Vivek Vishwanathan a.k.a. Vivi	Asianet	Dubbed to Tamil as Hello Kuttichathan (Star Vijay)
2009	Hello Kuttichathan 2	Vivek Vishwanathan a.k.a. Vivi	Asianet	
2012	Matinee	Shane also Director	YouTube	Short film
2012	Kadalum Phonum Teenegerum	DOP, Editor	YouTube	Short film
2012	Chiri	Director	YouTube	Short film
2019	Uppum Mulakum	Akkar	Flowers TV	Episode 1009, as a part of promoting his film Valiyaperunnal

== Awards ==
Year	Award	Category	Film	Result
2016	Asiavision Awards	New Sensation in acting (Male)	Kismath	Won
2017	South Indian International Movie Awards	Best Debut Actor – Malayalam	Kismath	Won
2017	Minnale Film & Television Awards	Best New Hero	Kismath	Won
2017	Yuva Awards	Rising Star (Male)	Parava	Won
2018	South Indian International Movie Awards	Best Supporting Actor – Malayalam	Parava	Won
2019	Asianet Film Awards	Best Star Pair (along with Nimisha Sajayan)	Eeda	Won
2019	Behindwoods Gold Medals 7th Edition	Best Actor Malayalam	Ishq	Won
2019	Vanitha Film Awards	Best Star Pair Award (along with Anna Ben)	Kumbalangi Nights	Won
2023	Kerala Film Critics Association Awards	Best Supporting Actor	RDX: Robert Dony Xavier, Vela	Won
