= Rex Vijayan =

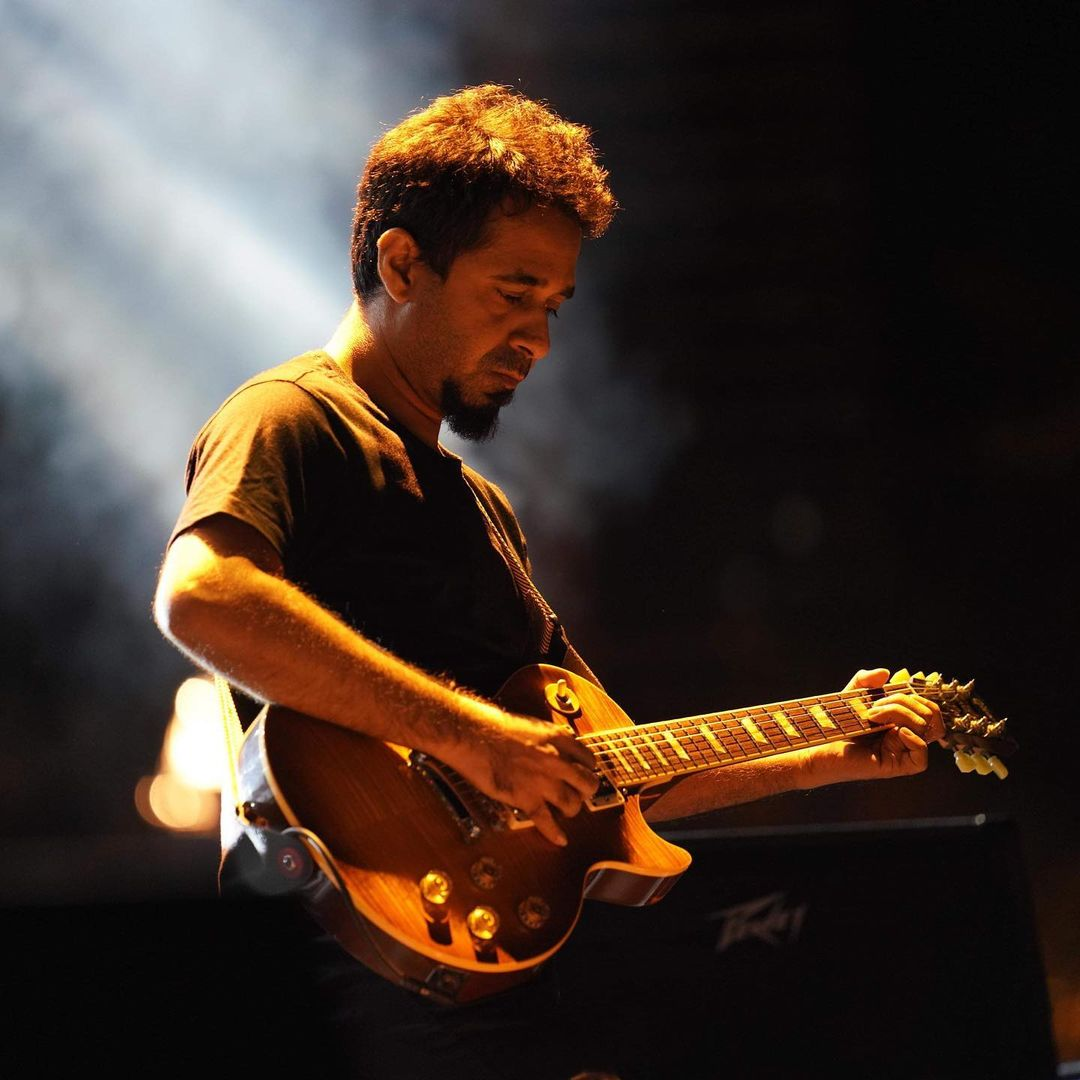
- Rex live on stage

Background information
- Born: 26 April 1983 (age 43); Kollam, Kerala, India
- Genres: Alternative rock; alternative metal
- Occupations: Guitarist; record producer; music composer; singer
- Instruments: Guitar, keyboard, synthesizer, ukulele
- Years active: 1995–present
- Member of: Rex Band,Avial
- Formerly of: Motherjane

Rex Vijayan (born 26 April 1983) is an Indian composer, guitarist, singer, record producer and multi-instrumentalist from Kerala. He is best known for being co-founder and guitarist for the alternative Malayali rock band Avial. He started out his career as a composer in the Malayalam film industry through Kerala Cafe by giving the score to Anwar Rasheed's segment 'Bridge'.

== Early life ==
He is the son of Albert Vijayan, a music director in Malayalam films. He self-learnt to play various instruments at a very young age and began his musical career by mastering cover versions. He married Chintu Ramesh on 14 March 2008 at Kollam. His brother Jackson Vijayan is also a musician.

== Motherjane ==
Vijayan was part of the popular Kochi based rock band Motherjane, as the rhythm guitarist from 2000 to 2003. Even though he left the band in 2003, He continued to associate with Motherjane as a consultant. He was the producer of the band's singles Jihad(2010), Clayplay(2015) and Namaste(2018).

== Avial ==
He is the music composer, lead guitarist and synthesizer of the Trivandrum-based Malayalam alternative rock band "Avial" since 2003.

== Other collaborations ==
He was part of an amateur German hip-hop band "Intensive Erfrischung" (Intensive Refreshment), which was based in Munich. He is also actively involved with Daksha Seth's Dance Company, which is concerned with performing on stage contemporary dance. Gibson Guitar Corporation, USA offered him to be their endorsee for their latest high end series guitar "Gibson Les Paul Classic".. He has also produced and composed music for some ad-films with Papaya Media, Kerala Tourism Dept. etc.

== Film composing ==
Rex debuted into film music direction with Anwar Rasheed's 'Bridge', a segment of the portmanteau film Kerala Cafe. He then did the composing of Chaappa Kurishu directed by Sameer Thahir, 22 Female Kottayam, by Aashiq Abu, helped with the background score of films Second Show and Friday and did music for Shyamaprasad's movie English in which he collaborated with American clarinet player and music composer Shankar Tucker in the song Aakashame featuring Rohan Kymal on vocals. He then did the title track for Anil Radhakrishnan Menon's debut movie North 24 Kaatham starring Fahadh Faasil. Rex Vijayan become a playback singer with ‘Enthanu Bhai' in Aashiq Abu's film Da Thadiya. His work for Sameer Thahir's second movie Neelakasham Pachakadal Chuvanna Bhoomi (after his directorial debut 'Chaappa Kurishu') has set a path breaking trend in Malayalam film music. Rex has also sung the title track 'Neelakasham' for the movie.

Sapthamashree Thaskaraha was Rex's next film, in which he composed songs such as Thaane Pookum and Nam Onnaayi. After that Rex went on to do the background score for Picket 43. He returned after a break with Parava in 2017. Later in the year he composed music for Aashiq Abu's Mayaanadhi. Rex's composition for the film was well appreciated. The song Mizhiyil Ninnum was a sensational hit and singer Shahabaz Aman won the Kerala State Film Award for Best Singer for the rendition. His latest releases as music composer are Sudani from Nigeria (2018), Thamaasha (2019) and Valiyaperunnal (2019), all were widely acclaimed. He also served as music producer for the 2020 movie Halal Love Story.

== Discography ==
=== Original soundtracks ===
	Film	Tracklist	Notes
2009	Kerala Cafe		Background Score (Segment: Bridge)
2011	Chappa Kurishu	1. Orunaalum Kaanaathe; 2. Theeye Theeye	Also composed Background Score
2012	22 Female Kottayam	1. Melle Kollum	Co-composed background score with Bijibal
2012	Second Show		Background Score only
2012	Friday		Background Score only
2013	English	1. Maayumee; 2. Aakashame; 3. Nila Vaaname; 4. Shalabhamayi; 5. Thaarame	Also Composed Background Score
2013	Neelakasham Pachakadal Chuvanna Bhoomi	1. Doore Doore; 2. Thaazhvaram; 3. Neelakasham; 4. Neerppalunkukal; 5. Ami Hitmajare	Also composed Background Score
2013	North 24 Kaatham	1. Thaanaaro (Title Song)	Title Song only
2014	Sapthamashree Thaskaraha	1. Kayyethum Doorathu; 2. Naam Onnayi; 3. Sapthamashree Thaskara; 4. Thaane Pookkum	
2015	Picket 43		Background score only
2015	Lord Livingstone 7000 Kandi	1. Aayiram Kaalamaayi; 2. Thaarangal Paadunne; 3. Kunnimani; 4. Dheera Charitha	
2017	Parava	1. Pyaar Pyaar; 2. Ormakal; 3. Pakalin Vaathil	Co-composed Background Score with Yakzan Gary Pereira, Neha Nair and Sekhar Menon
2017	Mayaanadhi	1. Kiliye; 2. Uyirin Nadhiye; 3. Kaattil; 4. Mizhiyil Ninnum	1song (Kaattil) co-composed with Shahabaz Aman; Co-composed Background Score with Yakzan Gary Pereira and Neha Nair
2018	Sudani from Nigeria	1. Kurrah; 2. Kinavu Kondoru; 3. Cherukatha Pole	1 Song (Kurrah) co-composed with Shahabaz Aman; Co-composed Background Score with Yakzan Gary Pereira, Neha Nair and Kishan Mohan
2019	Thamaasha	1. Paadi Njan; 2. Kaanumbol Ninne	1 song (Paadi Njan) co-composed with Shahabaz Aman; Also composed Background Score with Yakzan Gary Pereira and Neha Nair
2019	Valiyaperunnal	1. 'Hey' Song; 2. Chemmanam; 3. Labbaikkallah; 4. Thazhvarangal; 5. Piraanth; 6. Kochi-Mattanchery; 7. Uyirullavaram; 8. Vandu Njan	Also composed Background Score
2020	Halal Love Story	1. Sundaranayavane; 2. Bismillah	Credited as Music Producer
2023	Neelavelicham		Co-composed Background Score with Bijibal
2024	Rifle Club	1. Gandharva Ganam; 2. Aalunnu Neeye; 3. Killer On The Loose; 4. Nayattu Prarthana	Co-composed Background Score with Yakzan Gary Pereira and Neha Nair

=== As playback singer ===
Year	Song	Movie	Co-singer(s)	Music director/ Composer
2011	Oru Naalum Kaanathe	Chappa Kurishu	Rashmi Satheesh	Himself
2012	Enthanu Bhai	Da Thadiya	Bijibal, Jayaram Ranjith	Bijibal
2013	Neelakasham	Neelakasham Pachakadal Chuvanna Bhoomi		Himself
2015	Tharangal Padunne	Lord Livingstone 7000 Kandi		Himself
2017	Pyar Pyar	Parava		Himself
2017	Uyirin Nadhiye	Mayaanadhi	Neha Nair	Himself
2018	Cherukatha Pole	Sudani from Nigeria	Imam Majboor	Himself
2019	Thazhvarangal	Valiyaperunnal		Himself
2020	Jaalame	Trance	Lal Krishna, Divya S Menon, Namitha Raju, Gagul Joseph, Jackson Vijayan	Jackson Vijayan
2023	Manuja	Romancham		Sushin Shyam
2024	Nayattu Prarthana	Rifle Club	Neha Nair	Rex Vijayan

== Awards ==
Year	Award	Category	Film/Album/Song	Notes
2018	Filmfare Awards South	Best Music Director	Mayanadi	
2018	Indywood Academy Awards	Best Music Director	Mayanadi	
2018	Mazhavil Mango Music Awards	Best Music Director	Mayanadi	
2018	Movie Street Film Awards	Best Music Director	Mayanadi	
2018	CPC Cine Awards	Best Music Director	Mayanadi, Parava	
