= Valiyaperunnal =

Valiya Perunnal
- Theatrical release poster
- Directed by: Dimal Dennis
- Written by: Dimal Dennis; Thasreeq Abdul Salam
- Produced by: Monisha Rajeev
- Starring: Shane Nigam; Himika Bose; Joju George; Soubin Shahir
- Cinematography: Suresh Rajan
- Edited by: Vivek Harshan
- Music by: Rex Vijayan
- Production company: Magic Mountain Cinemas
- Distributed by: Anwar Rasheed Entertainments
- Release date: 20 December 2019
- Running time: 188 minutes
- Country: India
- Language: Malayalam

Valiyaperunnal (A festival of sacrifice) is a 2019 Indian Malayalam language romantic comedy crime drama film, directed by Dimal Dennis (in his directorial debut). It was scripted jointly by Dennis and Thasreeq Abdul Salam. The film has Shane Nigam in the lead role, along with Himika Bose, Joju George, Soubin Shahir, Vinayakan, Alencier Ley Lopez, Captain Raju and Dharmajan Bolgatty in other pivotal roles. The movie was released on 20 December 2019 in India and the countries of the Gulf Cooperation Council.

== Cast ==
- Shane Nigam as Akkar Salavudheen
- Himika Bose as Pooja
- Joju George as Perumbavoor Shivakumar
- Soubin Shahir as Hanumanth Sheonayi
- Vinayakan as himself (Cameo)
- James Elia as DYSP Chemban Babu
- Atul Kulkarni as Shivaji Rao
- Raza Murad as Khureshi
- Sudheer Karamana as Adv.Koolour
- Anil Nedumangad as George
- Jinu Joseph as himself (Cameo)
- Nishanth Sagar as Noushad
- Alencier Ley Lopez as SP Rajmohan IPS
- Captain Raju as Raju Daniel (Voice Dubbed by Kalabhavan Navas)
- Dharmajan Bolgatty as Atlee
- Aneesh G Menon as Imthiyas
- Abu Salim as DRI Officer, Sherif Khan
- Prem Prakash as Popcorn Basheer
- Aashiq Khalid as Jalaludheen Ahammad
- Sarath Chandran as Muneer
- Hafiz Abdul Jaleel as Koya Saahib
- Asha Madathil Sreekanth as Beevi

== Production ==
Valiya Perunnal was produced by Monisha Rajeev and co-produced by Shohaib Khan Hanif Rawther. Siju S Bava was the creative director. Vivek Harshan was the editor and Suresh Rajan was DOP. The movie's audiography was done by Sreejesh Nair and the sound design by Anish P Tom. Jayakrishnan was the production designer. Rex Vijayan composed the music for this movie. The trailer for the film was released on 14 December 2019.

== Soundtrack ==
The music was produced by Rex Vijayan. The soundtrack album consists of nine songs. It features remix versions of three old songs: "Kochi-Mattancheri", "Piraanth" and "Vandu Njan". "Labbaikkallah" was a poem by the late KV Aboobacker Master. The title song, "Hey", was composed by Saju Sreenivas and produced and arranged by Rex Vijayan. The song "Uyirullavaram" was co-produced by the Malayalam hip-hop band Street Academics.

Valiyaperunnal

Soundtrack album by Rex Vijayan
- Released: 6 January 2020
- Genre: Feature film soundtrack
- Length: 38:04
- Label: Monisha Rajeev Entertainments
- Producer: Rex Vijayan

Rex Vijayan chronology
Thamaasha (2019)	Valiyaperunnal (2020)	Halal Love Story (2020)
External audio
- Audio Jukebox on YouTube

Valiyaperunnal
No.	Title	Lyrics	Music	Singer(s)	Length
1.	"Hey"	Saju Sreenivas	Saju Sreenivas	Saju Sreenivas, Suchith Suresan	4:08
2.	"Chemmanam"	Saju Sreenivas	Rex Vijayan	Saju Sreenivas	4:17
3.	"Labbaikkallah"	K. V. Aboobacker Master	Rex Vijayan	Sooraj Santhosh, Imam Majboor	4:48
4.	"Thazhvarangal"	Anwar Ali	Rex Vijayan	Rex Vijayan	4:24
5.	"Piranth"	S. A. Jameel	S. A. Jameel/ Rex Vijayan	Afsal	3:29
6.	"Uyirullavaram Sakalorkkum"	Anwar Ali, Haris Saleem	Rex Vijayan, Street Academics	Benny Dayal, Haris Saleem	4:10
7.	"Kanda Kanda"	Dimal Dennis	Rex Vijayan	Gowry Lekshmi, Srinda, Sreenath Bhasi	4:25
8.	"Kochi-Mattancheri"	Traditional	Traditional/ Rex Vijayan	Haseena Beegam, Imam Majboor	5:08
9.	"Vandu Njan"	Unknown	Rex Vijayan	Shahabaz Aman	3:08
Total length:					38:04
