= Halal Love Story =

2020 film by Zakariya Mohammed

- Official release poster
- Directed by: Zakariya Mohammed
- Written by: Zakariya Mohammed; Muhsin Parari
- Produced by: Aashiq Abu; Jesna Ashim; Harshad Ali
- Starring: Indrajith Sukumaran; Joju George; Sharaf U Dheen; Grace Antony
- Cinematography: Ajay Menon
- Edited by: Saiju Sreedharan
- Music by: Songs: Shahabaz Aman; Bijibal; Music Producer: Rex Vijayan; Score: Yakzan Gary Pereira; Neha Nair
- Production companies: Papaya Films; OPM Cinemas; Ourhood Movies
- Distributed by: Amazon Prime Video
- Release date: 15 October 2020
- Country: India
- Language: Malayalam

Halal Love Story is a 2020 Malayalam-language comedy drama film directed by Zakariya Mohammed. The movie is scripted jointly by Zakariya and Muhsin Parari, with Ashif Kakkodi credited as co-writer. The film is bankrolled by Aashiq Abu under the banner OPM Cinemas, Jesna Ashim and Harshad Ali under Papaya Films. Zakariya and Muhsin Parari along with cinematographer Ajay Menon and editor Saiju Shreedharan are credited as co-producers under the banner Ourhood Movies.

The film features an ensemble cast including Indrajith Sukumaran, Joju George, Sharaf U Dheen, Grace Antony in lead roles along with Parvathy Thiruvothu and Soubin Shahir in cameos. The film released on 15 October through Amazon Prime Video.

== Plot ==
The film starts when Rahim, a member of a Muslim religious organization decides to make a Halal film as the organization see movies as Haram in general. Rahim then meets Shereef, who is an active street play actor for various protests. Both together meet Thoufeeq to ask to write a script for the film. Due to various limitations, Thoufeeq informs that a telefilm of one hour is better than a full-length feature film. As the organization gives node to the Halal movie, Siraj, is roped as director for the film. Siraj is described as enough mainstream by Thoufeeq, since he drinks and doesn't follows the religion strictly.

Actors are chosen from the organization, but extensive search were conducted for the lead pair. A real husband and wife is required for the lead as mixing for non-married adults can lead to the forbidden region. After the directions from leaders of the organization, wife of Shereef, Suhra agrees to take role of the heroine. And Shereef is also chosen as the hero. As the shooting starts, amateurish performance of actors leads to the sudden halt to shooting. Haseena, a casting director came into the scene and she gives basic acting training to the aspiring actors. In the training session Suhra revealed about a lie Shereef told about her father when he died. Shereef hears this and he becomes defensive. At the end of the session, only six people - including Suhra is chosen for the film. Since Suhra is selected, Shereef also gets selection as the film requires real life husband and wife.

As shooting progresses, Siraj finds that there is something wrong with Suhra and Shereef. He tells this to Thoufeeq and he rewrites the script to make amends between Suhra and Shereef. But things didn't go as planned and Siraj becomes angry. He announces that Shereef needs to reconcile with Suhra in order to continue the filming. As the ice melts, Siraj plans an additional shot for climax in which Suhra and Shereef hugs. But Thoufeeq is against this as he fears that the community may find this as not halal. At last the cinematographer says he know a way and the climax shooting starts. As Suhra and Shereef hugs, Thoufeeq comes into scene and says to stop the shooting. Cinematographer informs him that halal cut is already done. Siraj is also happy as the problems between Shereef and Suhra is also over. The film ends as Rahim and family performs Salah while the movie is running in the TV.

== Cast ==
- Indrajith Sukumaran as Shereef
- Joju George as Siraj
- Sharaf U Dheen as Thoufeeq
- Grace Antony as Suhra
- Abhiram Pothuval as Abhi
- Nazar Karutheny as Rahim
- Zeenath as Rahim's wife
- Assif Yogi as Cinematographer
- Unnimaya Prasad as Siraj's wife
- Navas Vallikkunnu as Divorce Lawyer
- Nilambur Ayisha as actress in telefilm
- Neeraja Rajendran as Thoufeeq's mother
- Shiny Sarah
- Ann Saleem
- Sidheek Kodiyathur
- Saheer Mohammed
- Banna Chennamangallur
- Ameen Jawhar
- Mamukkoya as Abukka (cameo)
- Soubin Shahir as Azad (cameo)
- Parvathy Thiruvothu as Haseena (cameo)
- Binu Pappu as Abukka's friend (cameo)

== Music ==
The film features songs composed by Shahabaz Aman and Bijibal with music produced by Rex Vijayan. The film score is composed by Yakzan Gary Pereira and Neha Nair. Lyrics were penned by Muhsin Parari and Anwar Ali. Additional Music Production is done by Palee Francis. Shahabaz Aman won the Kerala State Film Award for Best Singer for the rendition of the song "Sundaranayavane".

Halal Love Story

Soundtrack album by Bijibal, Shahabaz Aman, Rex Vijayan
- Released: 15 October 2020
- Recorded: 2019–2020
- Studio: My Studio, Kochi; Sapthaa Records, Kochi; Bodhi, Thrissur
- Genre: Feature film soundtrack
- Length: 8:44
- Language: Malayalam
- Label: OPM Records
- Producer: Rex Vijayan

Rex Vijayan chronology
Valiyaperunnal (2019)	Halal Love Story (2020)	Neelavelicham (2023)

Bijibal chronology
Uma Maheswara Ugra Roopasya (2020)	Halal Love Story (2020)	Vellam: The Essential Drink (2021)

Shahabaz Aman chronology
Thamaasha (2019)	Halal Love Story (2020)	Thuramukham (2023)

Halal Love Story
No.	Title	Lyrics	Music	Singer(s)	Length
1.	"Sundaranayavane"	Muhsin Parari	Shahabaz Aman	Shahabaz Aman	02:39
2.	"Bismillah"	Muhsin Parari	Shahabaz Aman	Shahabaz Aman	03:00
3.	"Muttath"	Anwar Ali	Bijibal	Soumya Ramakrishnan	03:03
Total length:					08:44

== Release ==
The film released on 15 October on Amazon Prime Video.

== Reception ==
On the review aggregator website Rotten Tomatoes, 75% of 8 critics' reviews are positive, with an average rating of 6.5/10.

Baradwaj Rangan of Film Companion South wrote: "Unfortunately, the second half undergoes a tonal shift and becomes serious. 'Becoming serious' is in itself not an issue. But given the humour-coated approach in the first half, some of the latter portions are too heavy, too big for a film that’s so far been working in a miniaturist mode."

== Accolades ==
Year	Award	Category	Recipient	Notes
2020	10th South Indian International Movie Awards	Best Actor in a Character Role	Joju George	
2020	10th South Indian International Movie Awards	Best Lyricist	Muhsin Parari	Song: "Sundaranayavane"
2020	Kerala State Film Awards	Best Male Singer	Shahabaz Aman	Song: "Sundaranayavane"
