= Veyil (2022 film) =

2022 Malayalam film

- Theatrical release poster
- Directed by: Sarath Menon
- Written by: Sarath Menon
- Produced by: Joby George Thadathil
- Starring: Shane Nigam; Shine Tom Chacko
- Cinematography: Shaz Mohammed
- Edited by: Praveen Prabhakar
- Music by: Pradeep Kumar
- Production company: Goodwill Entertainments
- Release date: 25 February 2022
- Country: India
- Language: Malayalam

Veyil (transl. Sunlight) is a 2022 Indian Malayalam-language coming-of-age Psychological drama film written and directed by Sarath Menon (in his directorial debut). It is produced by Joby George Thadathil under the banner of Goodwill Entertainments. The film stars Shane Nigam and Shine Tom Chacko.

The music is composed by Pradeep Kumar, while Shaz Mohammed completed the cinematography and Praveen Prabhakar has done the editing. The film was released on 25 February 2022, having been postponed from the initial release on 28 January 2022.

== Plot ==
Sidharth is a wayward youth living with his studious elder brother Karthi and their mother. Sidhu is poor in his academics and only interested in roaming around with his friend. He comes across Sruthy, who is the classmate of his friend's girlfriend, and eventually both fall for each other. Sidhu gets into all sorts of troubles, including beating up a guy who was trying to woo Sruthy and spreading rumors about her and lands up in the police station, eventually from where his mother must get him out. Sruthy's two uncles Baby and Jomy run a money lending business in the city. Baby the elder one, is trying to be a candidate for the municipal elections in the area but gets rejected in favor of the late councilor's son since there are many allegations of forced interest extortions from their finance firm. At some point, Sidhu realizes that Karthi also silently loves Sruthy and is heartbroken at the latter's affair with her. He starts avoiding Sruthy, and eventually the two break up, with Sruthy deciding to move back to Dubai to her parents. At the same time Jomy warns Sidhu to back off from the relationship, to which he agrees since he had already decided about it.

Karthi gets admission in a medical college after the entrance exams, while Sidhu flunks his 12th papers. Their mother books a flat in the city with her life savings but gets swindled by the real estate company when they change her booking to a flat with a lesser value and refuse to refund her. Knowing this, Sidhu goes to the company office and creates a ruckus, for which police eventually arrest him. Jomy bails him out with the hidden objective of utilizing him as their local muscle. He entrusts Sudhi and another goon Jins to beat up the councilor candidate. They break his legs when he is at the movie theatre restroom, and later Jins files a false sexual assault case against him. They then help Sidhu in return to get back his mother's money from the real estate company, which makes his mother happy but suspicious at the same time of the type of people his son is hanging out with. Sidhu progresses as a routine muscle guy to Jomy and joins Chimban, another one of their henchmen, in regularly harassing an autistic Kuttan and his mother to vacate their house, which belongs to Baby's father. Karthi knows Kuttan from a young age when they were neighbors in the past and cares for him. Once, after visiting Karthi in his hostel, Sidhu has Jomy roughen up Karthi's seniors in a bar since they had ragged him in the hostel. Karthi and Sidhu get into an argument over this, and when their mother intervenes, Sidhu walks out of the house. Sruthy comes back from Dubai and meets with Sidhu when he goes to the railway station to pick her family. She advises him not to waste his time as a henchman to her uncles and lead a good life. As time passes, Sidhu's mother talks about their past to Karthi and regrets not being able to bring up Sidhu well since she was always busy with the medications of the chronically sick Karthi. Karthi eventually reaches out to Sidhu, and the two have an emotional reconciliation and both return to their mother. The trio spend a lot of time together outside with Sidhu's friend.

Tired by Baby's gang's abuse for vacating the house, Kuttan's mother commits suicide by jumping in front of a train. When Sidhu hears of this, he rushes to the police station for Kuttan but learns that someone had already taken him away, confirming that he is intellectually disabled and not behind his mother's death. Sidhu stops hanging out with Jomy's gang, and one day, Chimban tries to provoke Sidhu telling him the same. They get into a fight, and Sidhu injures Chimban severely, leading to Chimban getting hospitalized. Sidhu storms into Baby's house for an explanation, but Baby just warns him away, telling that he already knew of Sudhi's affair with Sruthy and not to get involved in her life away. On the way back, he meets Jomy, who also assures him there will be no further trouble from their gang. When Sidhu gets back home, he finds Karthi is not there and goes out again in search of him. Karthi was the one who was protecting Kuttan by giving him food and he had gone to Kuttan's house that night to check on him, wearing Sidhu's baseball cap gifted by him. In the night, the mentally deranged Kuttan mistakes Karthi to be Sidhu by the cap and kills him in a fit of rage in retaliation for harassing him and his mother. Sidhu eventually finds Karthi's body and breaks down. The movie closes after some years when Kuttan gets released from jail and a now reformed Sidhu coming to meet him and hugging him.

== Cast ==
- Shane Nigam as Sidharth "Sid"
- Shine Tom Chacko as Jomy Mathew
- Sreerekhaa as Radha
- Sona Olickal as Sruthy
- James Elia as Baby Mathew
- Merin Jose Pottackal as Merin
- Saed Imran as Karthik "Karthi"
- Anandhu PM as Chimban
- Bitto Davis as Famous Francis
- Sudhi Koppa

== Soundtrack ==
The music for the film is being composed by Pradeep Kumar with lyrics for the songs written by Vinayak Sasikumar and Anwar Ali. Renganaath Ravee is in charge of sound design.

Veyil

Soundtrack album by Pradeep Kumar
- Released: 2021
- Recorded: 2020
- Genre: Feature film soundtrack
- Length: 21:46
- Label: Goodwill Entertainments
- Producer: Joby George

Tracklist
| No. | Title | Lyrics | Singer(s) | Length |
|---|---|---|---|---|
| 1. | "The Hey Song" | Vinayak Sasikumar | Aasha Sriram | 3:34 |
| 2. | "Pacha Rap" | Jango | Jango | 2:31 |
| 3. | "Mizhi Arikil" | Vinayak Sasikumar | Harisankar KS | 4:39 |
| 4. | "Kodum Ravil" | Anwar Ali | Sithara Krishnakumar | 3:25 |
| 5. | "Kannamma" | Pranavam Sasi | Pranavam Sasi | 3:15 |
| 6. | "Maname" | Vinayak Sasikumar | Pradeep Kumar | 4:21 |
| Total length: | | | | 21:46 |

== Accolades ==
| Award | Category | Winner | Ref. |
|---|---|---|---|
| 51st Kerala State Film Awards | Best Character Actress | Sreerekha | |

== Release ==
The film was initially scheduled to release on 28 January 2022, but was postponed due to COVID-19. The film was released on 25 February 2022 after many postponements.

== Reception ==
Veyil received positive reviews from critics.

Deepa Soman of Times of India gave a rating of 3.5/5 and wrote "A relatable family drama". OTTplay gave a rating of 3.5/5 and wrote "Shane Nigam revels in Sarath Menon's stellar family drama about the prism of perspectives". The News Minute gave 3/5 and wrote "This Shane Nigam film is well-made, just a tad confusing". The Cinema Express wrote that "Broken bonds are repaired in this deeply affecting family drama".
