= Kerala State Film Award for Best Singer =

Annual Indian film award

The Kerala State Film Award for Best Singer presented annually at the Kerala State Film Awards of India for best female and male playback singer in Malayalam cinema. This category of the awards was instituted in 1969. The first recipients were P. Leela and K. J. Yesudas. Yesudas has been the most frequent winner with 25 wins, followed by K. S. Chithra with 16 and S. Janaki with 11 awards. K. S. Chithra won the award for 11 successive years (1985–1996) that is the most times ever

== Best Male Playback Singer ==
Most Awards

- Artist: Wins
K J Yesudas	25
P Jayachandran	5
M. G. Sreekumar	3
G. Venugopal	3
Vijay Yesudas	3

Frequent Winner

List of frequent winners
- Artist: Wins
K J Yesudas	8 (1979-86)

Year	Image	Recipient(s)	Film(s)	Song(s)
1969		K. J. Yesudas	Kumara Sambhavam	Polthinkalkkala
1970		K. J. Yesudas	Various films	–
1971		K. J. Yesudas	Various films	–
1972		Jayachandran	Panitheeratha Veedu	Suprabhatham
1973		K. J. Yesudas	Various films	–
1974		K. J. Yesudas	Various films	–
1975		K. J. Yesudas	Various films	–
1976		K. J. Yesudas	Various films	–
1977		K. J. Yesudas	Jagadguru Aadisankaran, Angeekaaram	Shankara Digvijayam, Neelajalaashayathil
1978		Jayachandran	Bandhanam	Ragam Sreeragam
1979		K. J. Yesudas	Ulkkadal	Krishnathulasi Kathirukal
1980		K. J. Yesudas	Mela, Manjil Virinja Pookkal, Angadi	Manassoru Manthrika, Mizhiyoram, Paavada Venam
1981		K. J. Yesudas	Various films	
1982		K. J. Yesudas	Various films	
1983		K. J. Yesudas	Various films	
1984		K. J. Yesudas	Swantham Sharika	Ee Marubhoovil
1985		K. J. Yesudas	Ambada Njaane!, Oru Kudakeezhil	Vachalamakum Mounam, Anuragini Itha En
1986		K. J. Yesudas	Nakhakshathangal	Areyum Bhavagayakan akkum
1987		M. Balamuralikrishna	Swathi Thirunal	Mokshamu Galadha
1988		G. Venugopal	Moonnam Pakkam	Unarumee Gaanam
1989		M. G. Sreekumar	Kireedam, Vadakkunokkiyantram	Kanneer Poovinte, Maayaa Mayooram
1990		G. Venugopal	Sasneham	Thane Poovitta Moham
1991		M. G. Sreekumar	Kilukkam, Thudarkkatha	Kilukil Pambaram, Aathira Varavayi
1992		M. G. Sreekumar	Various films	
1993		K. J. Yesudas	Akashadoothu, Padheyam, Chenkol	Raappadi Kezhunnuvo, Chandrakantham Kondu, Madhuram Jeevamrutha
1994		K. J. Yesudas	Parinayam	Saamaja Sancharini
1995		K. J. Yesudas	No. 1 Snehatheeram Bangalore North, Mazhayethum Munpe, Punnaram	Ponnambili Pottum Thott, Aathmavin Pusthakathaalil, Japamaay Vedha Sadhakamaay
1996		K. J. Yesudas	Deshadanam, Thooval Kottaram	Kaliveedurangiyallo, Parvathi Manohari
1997		K. J. Yesudas	Aaraam Thampuran	Harimuraleeravam
1998		K. J. Yesudas	Ayal Kadha Ezhuthukayanu	Etho Nidra Than
1999		Jayachandran	Niram	Prayam Nammil Moham
2000		Vidhu Prathap	Sayahnam	Kaalame Kaikkolluka Nee
2001		K. J. Yesudas	Ravanaprabhu	Aakasha Deepangal Sakshi
2002		Madhu Balakrishnan	Valkannadi	Amme Amme
2003		Jayachandran	Thilakkam	Neeyoru Puzhayay
2004		G. Venugopal	Ullam	Aadedi Aadadedi
2005		M. Jayachandran	Nottam	Melle Melle
2006		Srinivas	Rathri Mazha	Bansuri Sruthi Pole
2007		Vijay Yesudas	Nivedyam	Kolakkuzhalvili Ketto
2008		Shankar Mahadevan	Madampi	Kalyana Kacheri
2009		K. J. Yesudas	Madhya Venal	Swantham Swantham
2010		Hariharan	Paattinte Palazhy	Paattu Paaduvan Mathram
2011		Sudeep Kumar	Rathinirvedam	Chembakapoonkavile
2012		Vijay Yesudas	Grandmaster, Spirit	Akaleyo Nee, Mazhakondu Mathram
2013		Karthik	Orissa	Janmantharangalil
2014		K. J. Yesudas	White Boys	Aadityakiranangal
2015		Jayachandran	Jilebi, Ennum Eppozhum, Ennu Ninte Moideen	Njanoru Malayali, Malarvaka Kombathu, Saradambaram
2016		Sooraj Santhosh	Guppy	Thaniye Mizhikal
2017		Shahabaz Aman	Mayaanadhi	Mizhiyil Ninnum
2018		Vijay Yesudas	Joseph	Poomuthole
2019		Najim Arshad	Kettyolaanu Ente Malakha	Aathmavile
2020		Shahabaz Aman	Halal Love Story, Vellam	Sundaranayavane, Aakashamayavale
2021		Pradeep Kumar	Minnal Murali	"Raavil'"
2022		Kapil Kapilan	Pallotty 90’s Kids	"Kanave"
2023		Vidyadharan	Jananam 1947 Pranayam Thudarunnu	"Pathiranennorthu"
2024		K. S. Harisankar	A. R. M.	"Kiliye"

== Best Female Playback Singer ==
Artist
K. S. Chithra	16
S. Janaki	11
Shreya Ghoshal	4
Sujatha Mohan	3
Sithara Krishnakumar	3

Frequent Winner

List of frequent winners
- Artist: Wins
K. S. Chithra	11 (1985-95 )
S. Janaki	6 (1979-84)

Year	Image	Recipient(s)	Film(s)	Song(s)
1969		P. Leela	Kadalpalam	Ujjayiniyile Gayika
1970		S. Janaki	Sthree	Innale Neeyoru
1971		P. Susheela	Oru Penninte Kadha	Poonthenaruvi
1972		S. Janaki	Pulliman	Aayiram Varnangal
1973		P. Madhuri	Eanippadikal	Praananaadhanenikku Nalkiya
1974		S. Janaki	Chandrakantham	Aa Nimishathinte
1975		P. Susheela	Chuvanna Sandhyakal	Poovukalkku Punyakaalam
1976		S. Janaki	Aalinganam	Thushaara Bindukkale
1977		S. Janaki	Madanolsavam	Sandhye
1978		P. Madhuri	Tharoo Oru Janmam Koodi	Raakkilikal Paadi
1979		S. Janaki	Thakara	Mouname Nirayum
1980		S. Janaki	Manjil Virinja Pookkal, Aniyaatha Valakal, Chamaram	Manjanikombil, Oru Mayilppeeliyay, Naadha Nee Varum
1981		S. Janaki	Oppol	Ettumanoor Ambalathil
1982		S. Janaki	Olangal, Ith Njangalude Katha	Thumbi Vaa, Swarna Mukile
1983		S. Janaki	Kattathe Kilikkoodu	Gopike Nin Viral
1984		S. Janaki	Kanamarayathu	Kasthoorimaan Kurunne
1985		K. S. Chithra	Ente Kaanakkuyil, Nirakkoottu	Ore Swaram, Poomaaname
1986		K. S. Chithra	Nakhakshathangal	Manjal Prasadavum
1987		K. S. Chithra	Eenam Maranna Kattu, Ezhuthapurangal	Eenam Maranna Kaatte, Thalolam Paithal
1988		K. S. Chithra	Vaishali	Indu Pushpam Choodi Nilkkum
1989		K. S. Chithra	Oru Vadakkan Veeragatha, Mazhavilkavadi	Kalari Vilakku, Thanka Thoni
1990		K. S. Chithra	Njan Gandharvan, Innale	Palappoove Nin, Kannil Nin Meyyil
1991		K. S. Chithra	Keli, Santhwanam	Thaaram Vaalkannadi, Swara Kanyakamar
1992		K. S. Chithra	Savidham	Mouna Sarovaramake
1993		K. S. Chithra	Sopanam, Chamayam, Ghazal	Ponmeghame, Rajahamsame, Sangeethame
1994		K. S. Chithra	Parinayam	Parvanendu Mukhi
1995		K. S. Chithra	Devaraagam	Shashikala Chaarthiya
1996		Sujatha Mohan	Azhakiya Ravanan	Pranayamani Thooval
1997		Bhavana Radhakrishnan	Kaliyattam	Ennodenthini Pinakkam
1998		Sujatha Mohan	Pranayavarnangal	Varamanjaladiya Raavinte
1999		K. S. Chithra	Angene Oru Avadhikkalathu	Pular Veyilum Pakal Mukilum
2000		Asha G. Menon	Mazha	Aaradyam Parayum
2001		K. S. Chithra	Theerthadanam	Mooli Mooli Kaattinundoru
2002		K. S. Chithra	Nandanam	Kaarmukil Varnante
2003		Gayatri Asokan	Sasneham Sumithra	Enthe Nee Kanna
2004		Manjari	Makalkku	Mukilin Makale
2005		K. S. Chithra	Nottam	Mayangippoyi
2006		Sujatha Mohan	Rathri Mazha	Bansuri Sruthi Pole
2007		Shweta Mohan	Nivedyam	Kolakkuzhal Vili Ketto
2008		Manjari	Vilapangalkappuram	Mullulla Murikkinmel
2009		Shreya Ghoshal	Banaras	Chandu Thottille
2010		Rajalakshmy	Janakan	Olichirunne
2011		Shreya Ghoshal	Veeraputhran, Rathinirvedam	Kannodu Kannoram, Kannoram Chingaram
2012		Sithara Krishnakumar	Celluloid	Enundodi Ambili Chantham
2013		Vaikom Vijayalakshmi	Nadan	Ottaykku Padunna
2014		Shreya Ghoshal	How Old Are You?	Vijanathayil
2015		Madhushree Narayan	Edavappathy	Pashyathi Dhishi Dhishi
2016		K. S. Chithra	Kambhoji	Nadavathil Thuranilla
2017		Sithara Krishnakumar	Vimaanam	Vaanamakalunnuvo
2018		Shreya Ghoshal	Aami	Neermathaala Poovinnullil
2019		Madhushree Narayan	Kolaambi	Parayatharikil Vanna Pranayame
2020		Nithya Mammen	Sufiyum Sujathayum	Vaathikkalu Vellari pravu
2021		Sithara Krishnakumar	Kaanekkaane	Paalnilavin Poykayil
2022		Mridula Warrier	Pathonpatham Noottandu	Mayipeeli Ilakunnu
2023		Anne Amie	Pachuvum Athbutha Vilakkum	Thinkal Poovin
2024		Zeba Tommy	Am Ah	"Aarorum"

== Special Jury Award and Special Jury Mention in This Category ==
Year	Image	Recipient(s)	Award	Film(s)	Song(s)
2012		G. Sreeram	Special Mention	Celluloid	Kaatte Kaatte Nee
2012		Vaikom Vijayalakshmi	Special Mention	Celluloid	Kaatte Kaatte Nee
2013		Mridula Warrier	Special Jury Award	Kalimannu	Lalee Lalee
2014		M. G. Swarasagar	Special Mention	Manalchitrangal	Kunjikkuruvikale, Doore Chaare Vachalamay
2015		Sreya Jayadeep	Special Mention	Amar Akbar Anthony	Enno Njanente
2020		Nanjiyamma	Special Mention (Special award for trans people or women for any category)	Ayyappanum Koshiyum	Kalakkatha Sandanamera

== Best Classical Music Singer ==
Year	Image	Singer	Film	Song
2009		Sharreth	Meghatheertham	Bhavayami
2010		M. Balamuralikrishna	Gramam	
