= Parava (film) =

2017 film

- Theatrical release poster
- Directed by: Soubin Shahir
- Written by: Soubin Shahir; Muneer Ali
- Produced by: Anwar Rasheed; Shyju Unni
- Starring: Amal Shah; Govind V. Pai; Shane Nigam; Dulquer Salmaan
- Cinematography: Littil Swayamp
- Edited by: Praveen Prabhakar
- Music by: Songs: Rex Vijayan; Background score: Yakzan-Neha; Sekhar Menon; Rex Vijayan
- Production companies: Anwar Rasheed Entertainments; The Movie Club
- Distributed by: A & A Release
- Release date: 21 September 2017
- Running time: 144 minutes
- Country: India
- Language: Malayalam
- Box office: ₹20.27 cr

Parava (transl. Bird) is a 2017 Indian Malayalam-language coming of age drama film directed by Soubin Shahir with a script jointly written by Soubin and Muneer Ali. (It is Soubin's directorial debut). The film stars Dulquer Salmaan along with Shane Nigam, Amal Shah and Govind V. Pai. Principal photography began at Fort Kochi on 1 June 2016. The film was released on 21 September 2017.

== Plot ==
The story takes place in Mattancherry and revolves around the life of two teenagers namely Haseeb and Irshad a.k.a. "Ichappi". Both of them are best friends and share a common interest in pigeon taming. Ichappi lives with his parents, his sister, and his brother Shain. Shain is indifferent and doesn't speak to anyone. The boys' love for birds is unconditional. They have local competitors, who have stolen their prized champion female pigeon. Though it is stated that Ichappi and Haseeb are not aware of this. When school reopens Ichappi is sad since he could not pass ninth grade. However, his new class teacher consoles him and offers to help him. Ichappi happens to meet Surumi, a new student in Haseeb's class, and falls for her. He notices that most of the boys are behind her. The boys while playing cricket encounters two drug addicts who had an impact on their past. Ichappi recollects the story.

A few years ago, there used to be a local club named Six Four Mattanchery led by Imran. It was a local cricket club, that competed in local matches. Ichappi's brother Shain was the star player of the club. Apart from being cricket mates, all the members of the club were best friends. The members of the club respected and loved Imran a lot. Shain meets a girl caretaker when Imran arranges lunch for some orphans. He immediately falls for her. Imran, knowing all about Shain and the girl goes to Shain's house and convinces Shain's parents for Shain's marriage. Shain's father asks Imran that there is no haste in getting him married, so let's just fix it for now. Once, one of the club's members Hakeem's sister Habeeba who works in a medical store is verbally assaulted by her boss. The club members, in the absence of Imran, vowed to seek revenge and bashes up the boss but accidentally get into a fight with some drug addicts. The addicts are thrashed in the chaos. They vow to take revenge against the club members. Imran discovers this and is infuriated by their actions. However, while meeting them at the beach at night Imran and his club members is confronted by the addicts. Imran tries for a peace treaty but it results in vain. They get into a fight when Imran urges the club members to leave the place to which the members respond positively. However, Imran couldn't stop the goons and ended up getting killed. The club members and their parents mourn the loss of Imran. Shain who strongly believed that he was responsible for Imran's demise becomes violently emotional. Shain's father grieves the loss and orders all the other club members to never meet Shain since they left Imran alone. According to him, it's not something that friends do. After this, Shain and his father live in the same house but never talk. Shain isolates himself from everyone.

Ichappi recollects this story. Ichappi goes to school and proposes to Surumi by kissing on her cheeks and is slapped in return. Ichappi gets nervous and fears that Surumi might spread this news to her parents as well as teachers. He fakes fever for the next few days and sends Haseeb to inquire about the happenings at school. Surumi confronts Haseeb and tells him not to worry and let Ichappi know that she isn't going to disclose it to anyone. Though Ichappi returns, he is saddened by the fact that Surumi has left the school under unknown circumstances. Ichappi and Haseeb under the pressure from a few other friends go to watch an adult movie. Ichappi feels uncomfortable all the time and upon reaching home, is confronted by an angry mother. His father asks him about the movie and to everyone's surprise just gives him advice to not repeat this. Upon questioning by the mother, he responds that being harsh with Shain never worked out as he wanted, he doesn't want his other son to stop speaking to him too. Hakeem's wedding is fixed. On the wedding day, Ichappi and Haseeb are shocked to find Surumi as the bride. From one of the children that roam around the competitor's place, they learn of the stolen bird. They retrieve their bird with the children's help. The local pigeon flying competition is on and the boys register their names for the competition. The birds and the whole cage disappear on the day of the competition. In tears, they fly the only pair they have. They had hidden the oldest pair in a different place. The boys can fly their birds for a long time but are interrupted by Ichappi's father who scolds them for losing the birds. The birds fly away somewhere. Ichappi and Haseeb misunderstand that their rivals stole them but they admit they didn't. Shain discovers that the birds are in the clutches of the addicts who returned from jail and wanted revenge. Shain and his friends fight the goons. Shain tries to kill them but is stopped by his friends. His father and Hakeem's father come and thrash the goons. As the police arrive, Shain's father warns the Sub-Inspector that if they return, they will be killed. He then holds Shain's hand as they leave, symbolizing the end of the father-son dispute.

The club members are shown playing cricket. Shain is shown to have left his isolation and is back on track to continue his love story. A smiling Imran is shown sitting on the fence with some children watching the friends happily enjoying their unison. Ichappi and Haseeb continue their pigeon taming. The end shot showcases the pigeon (Parava) landing on Ichappi's hand.

== Cast ==
- Amal Shah as Irshad aka 'Ichappi' Shain's younger brother and Haseeb's best friend
- Govind. V. Pai as Haseeb, Irshad's best friend
- Shane Nigam as Shain, Irshad's elder brother
- Dulquer Salmaan as Imran
- Siddique as Shain's and Irshad's father
- Jacob Gregory as Mujeeb
- Arjun Ashokan as Hakeem
- Zinil Zainudeen as Sharaf
- Manaal Sheeraz as Surumi
- Harishree Ashokan as Habeeba & Hakeem's father
- Indrans as Mujeeb's father
- Soubin Shahir Director
- Sreenath Bhasi as a Drug addict
- Srinda Arhaan as Habeeba
- Shine Tom Chacko as Rauf
- Abhiram Radhakrishnan as Manaf
- Len Prasad
- Anagha LK as Shane's love interest
- Aashiq Abu as Police Officer
- Jaffar Idukki as Khader, Sharaf's Father
- Unnimaya Prasad as Irshad's class teacher
- Khalid Rahman as a drug addict
- Vijay Kumar

== Production ==
After assisting several directors, Soubin started co-writing a script with friend Muneer Ali, who wrote the script for the segment "Sethulakshmi" in 5 Sundarikal in late 2015. In early 2016, Anwar Rasheed announced that he would produce Soubin's directorial debut. A casting call announcement was made on 23 April 2016 throughout social media seeking male and female actors between age 13 and 26.

== Soundtrack ==
The original soundtrack and background score were composed by Rex Vijayan, with lyrics penned by Vinayak Sasikumar. An additional song titled "Vadakkele Pathoone", sung by K. E. Nabeesa, a native artist of Mattancheri, is also included in the film as title track.

Parava

Soundtrack album by Rex Vijayan
- Released: September 29, 2017
- Genre: Feature film soundtrack
- Length: 46:09
- Label: Anwar Rasheed Entertainment
- Producer: Rex Vijayan

Rex Vijayan chronology
Lord Livingstone 7000 Kandi (2015)	Parava (2017)	Mayaanadhi (2017)
External audio
- Audio Jukebox on YouTube

Parava (Original Motion Picture Soundtrack)
No.	Title	Lyrics	Singer(s)	Length
1.	"Pyaar Pyaar"	Vinayak Sasikumar	Rex Vijayan	4:12
2.	"Ormakal"	Vinayak Sasikumar	Dulquer Salmaan	3:38
3.	"Pakalin Vaathil"	Vinayak Sasikumar	Sreenath Bhasi	3:41
4.	"Ichaapi and Haseeb Intro"			2:11
5.	"Parava Theme"			3:32
6.	"Beach"			0:49
7.	"Ichaappi Becomes Leader"			2:35
8.	"Ichaappi's Love Theme"			1:27
9.	"Chaandal"			0:50
10.	"Dark"			0:44
11.	"Imran intro"			1:05
12.	"Shane's Love (theme)"			2:44
13.	"Clash"			4:31
14.	"Birth"			1:34
15.	"Stealing Back Myna Pravu"			2:18
16.	"The Lovers Unite"			3:08
17.	"The Last Parava"			0:51
18.	"The Revenge"			4:49
19.	"The End"			1:30

== Release ==
The film was released on 21 September 2017.

=== Box office ===
The film was commercial success. The film collected ₹2.64 crores from first day of its release. The film collected ₹19.4 crores within 26 days of theatrical run. The film ran 100 days in theatres.

== Reception ==
=== Critical ===
I have many reasons to fly with this film and yet once the lights darkened, these two boys whisked me into their world among fluttering hopes and heartaches and so much more... an incredibly atmospheric film that has been made with a lotta love... congratulations to the whole team of Parava! MUST WATCH!!

— Anjali Menon

Deepa Soman of Times of India rated the film 3/5: "Soubin Shahir... uses the not-yet-explored horizon of the sport as the backdrop to tell the story of his home turf, its many varied characters with painful pasts and present, bittersweet realities of the region and its portraits of friendships."

Behindwoods' reviewer rated the film 2.75/5 and wrote, "Performance is the magical touch that makes the simple story special. To be frank, even though Dulquer Salmaan is only there in the movie for a mere 25 minutes, Parava is truly his movie. The story of the film is deeply rooted in Imran, the character played by Dulquer who has effortlessly given his best, be it the body language or the accent of the local Mattancherry boy. Siddique and Shane Nigam have yet again delivered strong performances along with Soubin Shahir and Srinath Bhasi who essayed the roles of the antagonists to perfection. Actor Harisree Ashokan's son Arjun Ashokan and actor Zainudeen's son Zinil Zainudeen have performed neatly in important roles. The kids who played the pivotal roles of Irshad and Haseeb, the pigeon flyers also deserve a tap on their shoulders for their performances. Indrans, Harisree Ashokan, Shine Tom Chacko, Gregory, Jaffer Idukki, and Srinda Arhaan have done a good job in their supporting roles."

Baradwaj Rangan of Film Companion South wrote "Parava doesn't find a balance between its two narratives, two moods, and indeed, two modes of storytelling: one small and intimate, the other broad and more commercial, with a score (by Rex Vijayan) that just won't stop. And for a story that we entered through its children, it feels like a betrayal when they are abandoned for large stretches focusing on the grown-ups."

=== Theatrical ===
It almost collected Rs 20.27 crore at the box office within 26 days in Kerala.
