= Kallan D'Souza =

2022 Indian Malayalam-language film

- Official poster
- Directed by: Jithu K Jayan
- Written by: Sajeer Baba
- Produced by: Ramshi Ahmed
- Starring: Soubin Shahir; Dileesh Pothan; Surabhi Lakshmi; Hareesh Kanaran
- Cinematography: Arun Chalil
- Edited by: Rizaal Jainy
- Music by: Songs: Leo Tom; Prashanth Karma; Background Score: Kailas Menon
- Production company: Ruby Films
- Release date: 21 January 2022
- Country: India
- Language: Malayalam
- Box office: ₹0.53 crore

Kallan D'Souza (transl. Thief D'Souza) is a 2022 Indian Malayalam-language action comedy film directed by Jithu K. Jayan and starring Soubin Shahir, Dileesh Pothan, Surabhi Lakshmi and Hareesh Kanaran. The music was scored by Kailas Menon. The film is a spin-off to 2015 Malayalam film Charlie where Soubin Shahir reprises his role as Kallan D'Souza.

== Cast ==
- Soubin Shahir as D'Souza
- Dileesh Pothan as CI Manoj
- Surabhi Lakshmi as Asha
- Rony David as Muhammad Iqbal
- Hareesh Kanaran as Charlie, D'Souza asst.
- Vijayaraghavan as DYSP Abraham
- Sreejith Ravi as CPO Sukumaran
- Santhosh Keezhattoor as CPO Jayakrishnan
- Privin Vinish as Gunda
- Prem Kumar as Babu
- Krishnakumar as George

== Reception ==
A critic from The Times of India wrote that "While the premise of blurring the lines between traditional roles of good and bad is interesting, the film is hardly well developed". A critic from The Indian Express wrote that "There are no humour elements, memorable moments or engaging factors in Kallan D'Souza other than the curiosity to know whether Asha and her child get a relief from the hands of Manoj". On the contrary, a critic from Manorama Online wrote that "Kallan D'Souza is definitely an engaging watch". A critic from OTT Play wrote that "Kallan D'Souza is a comedy that lacks any real humour and gets lost in what they really wanted to do, with the two subplots".
