= Shahabaz Aman =

Indian playback singer and composer

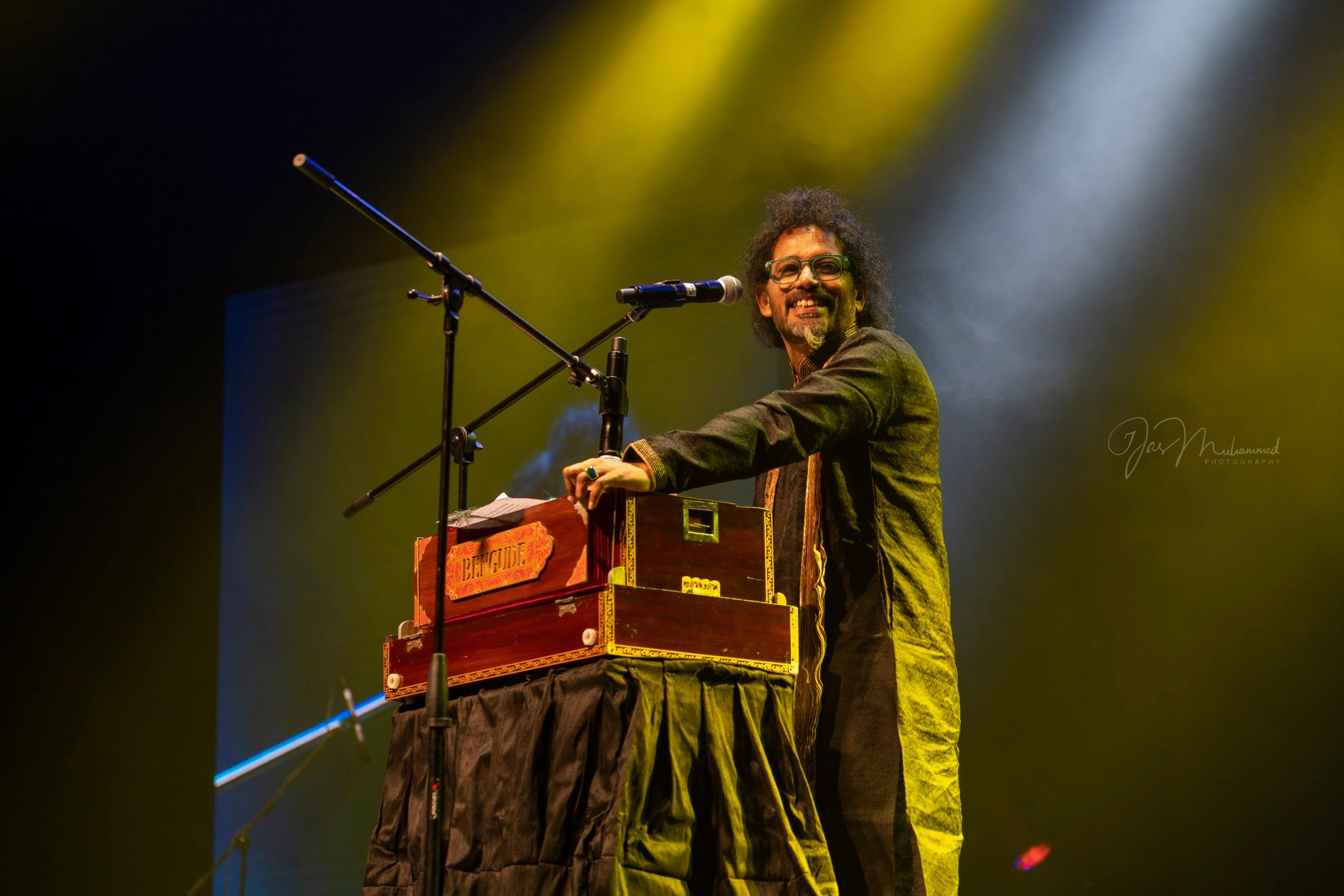
- Aman in 2019

Background information
- Born: Rafeek; 27 December 1969 (age 56); Malappuram, India
- Genres: Ghazal, Film scores, Soundtracks
- Occupations: Singer, Music Composer, Lyricist
- Years active: 1997–present
- Label: Shahabaz Music

Shahabaz Aman (born 27 December 1969) is an Indian playback singer and composer. He was born in Malappuram, Kerala, India. He is also a stage performer of Ghazal. Shahabaz is known for his soulful, romantic voice and unique style of singing. He has released music albums of various genres and performed across India and Persian Gulf countries. He is a two-time winner of Kerala State Film Award for Best Singer.

== Discography ==
=== Studio albums ===
Year	Title	Track listing	Singer(s)	Lyrics	Notes
1997	Ashiyana: the New Generation Malabari Songs	N/A	Sibella Sadanandan, Shanavas Perumpalli	Shahabaz Aman	
2004	Soul of Anamika in Black and White	Soja- Part I	Shahabaz Aman	Kidar Sharma	Interpretation of ‘Soja Rajakumari’ from the movie Zindagi
2004	Soul of Anamika in Black and White	Sajnee (M)	Shahabaz Aman	Shahabaz Aman	
2004	Soul of Anamika in Black and White	Sajnee (F)	Chitra Iyer	Shahabaz Aman	
2004	Soul of Anamika in Black and White	Vedanakal	Palakkad Sreeram	Shahabaz Aman	
2004	Soul of Anamika in Black and White	Rahiye	Shahabaz Aman	Ghalib	
2004	Soul of Anamika in Black and White	Tribute to M.S Baburaj	Instrumental		
2004	Soul of Anamika in Black and White	Oh Nilave	Juvaani	Shahabaz Aman	
2004	Soul of Anamika in Black and White	Greeshmame Sakhi	Palakkad Sreeram, A. Ayyappan, Philip V Francis	A. Ayyappan	
2004	Soul of Anamika in Black and White	Sagara Seema	Chitra Iyer, V.T Murali, Njeralath Harigovindan, Jyotsna Radhakrishnan, Melattur Ramakrishna Pulluvar	Shahabaz Aman	
2004	Soul of Anamika in Black and White	Manjil	Shahabaz Aman, Laveena	Shahabaz Aman	
2004	Soul of Anamika in Black and White	Street (Soja Part II)	T. G. Varna		
2005	Neeyum Nilavum	Chirikkan Marannu	Shahabaz Aman	Poovachal Khader	
2005	Neeyum Nilavum	Ghazal Thorumbol	Shahabaz Aman	Shanavas Konarath	
2005	Neeyum Nilavum	Madangiyethumbol	Shahabaz Aman	O. P. Suresh	
2005	Neeyum Nilavum	Neeyum Nilavum	Shahabaz Aman	Shahabaz Aman	
2005	Neeyum Nilavum	Parayathe Poyathum	Shahabaz Aman	T. A. Shahid	
2005	Neeyum Nilavum	Premathin Prathiphalam	Shahabaz Aman	Poovachal Khader	
2005	Neeyum Nilavum	Puzhayude Geetham	Gayatri Asokan	Poovachal Khader	
2005	Neeyum Nilavum	Kinavin Sangamam	Shahabaz Aman, Gayatri Asokan	Poovachal Khader	
2005	Neeyum Nilavum	Nilavil Sada	Shahabaz Aman, Gayatri Asokan	Shahabaz Aman	
2006	June Mazhayi	Abhayatheeram	T. G. Varna	Dr. Manoj	
2006	June Mazhayi	Ee Rathriyethrayanadham	Shahabaz Aman	Rafeeq Ahamed	
2006	June Mazhayi	Mazhakondu Mathram	Shahabaz Aman	Rafeeq Ahamed	
2006	June Mazhayi	Ee chillayil Ninnu	G. Venugopal	Rafeeq Ahamed	
2006	June Mazhayi	Kettu Marannoru	Shahabaz Aman, Rachana John	Rafeeq Ahamed	
2006	June Mazhayi	Nin Kilivathilinarikil	Sreedevi R Krishna	Rafeeq Ahamed	
2006	June Mazhayi	Paathimayakkathil	Shahabaz Aman, Gayatri Asokan	Rafeeq Ahamed	
2006	June Mazhayi	Sagarormikal	Gayatri Asokan	Rafeeq Ahamed	
2007	Sahayathrike	Ambilikkunjurangi	G. Venugopal	O. N. V. Kurup	
2007	Sahayathrike	Athilolam	G. Venugopal	O. N. V. Kurup	
2007	Sahayathrike	Ethra Madhuram	G. Venugopal	O. N. V. Kurup	
2007	Sahayathrike	Ithirippoove	G. Venugopal	O. N. V. Kurup	
2007	Sahayathrike	Kadalikal	G. Venugopal	O. N. V. Kurup	
2007	Sahayathrike	Nee Arikilirikkoo	G. Venugopal	O. N. V. Kurup	
2007	Sahayathrike	Sahayathrike	G. Venugopal	O. N. V. Kurup	
2007	Sahayathrike	Valathukaal	G. Venugopal	O. N. V. Kurup	
2007	Sahayathrike	Poomarakkombathu	G. Venugopal, Gayatri Asokan	O. N. V. Kurup	
2007	Sahayathrike	Poothilanjikal	G. Venugopal, Gayatri Asokan	O. N. V. Kurup	
2008	Alakalkku	Doore	Shahabaz Aman	Rafeeq Ahamed	
2008	Alakalkku	Makarakkulir	Shahabaz Aman	K. Satchidanandan	
2008	Alakalkku	Manoharam Mahavanam	Shahabaz Aman	Kadammanitta Ramakrishnan	
2008	Alakalkku	Paaymaram	Shahabaz Aman	T. P. Anilkumar	
2008	Alakalkku	Theeyalakal	Shahabaz Aman	D. Vinayachandran	
2008	Alakalkku	Alayothungiya	Gayatri Asokan	Kamala Surayya	
2008	Alakalkku	Orila Marathilninnum	Gayatri Asokan	Rosemary	
2008	Alakalkku	Ottum Urangatha	Gayatri Asokan	Serina	
2008	Alakalkku	Charadu Murinjoru	Shahabaz Aman, Gayatri Asokan	Mohanakrishnan	
2011	Sajnee	Aa Paneerppookkal	Shahabaz Aman	Kabeer	
2011	Sajnee	Ethra Doore	Shahabaz Aman	Pradeep Ashtamichira	
2011	Sajnee	Manninnadiyil	Shahabaz Aman	Veerankutty	
2011	Sajnee	Oru Paanapaathram	Shahabaz Aman	D. Santhosh	
2011	Sajnee	Othupalli	Shahabaz Aman	P. T. Abdurahiman	
2011	Sajnee	Sajnee	Shahabaz Aman	Shahabaz Aman	
2011	Sajnee	Hey Gaayakaa	Gayatri Asokan	Dr. Kavitha Balakrishnan	
2011	Sajnee	Oru Mazha	Shahabaz Aman, Gayatri Asokan	N. P. Sajeesh	
2015	KEF 1126 - Malayalam Sufi Route	Darvesh	Shahabaz Aman, Santhi Bijibal, Soumya Ramakrishnan, Amal Antony Augustin, Swetha, Deepa Anjali, KJ Anitha, KJ Manoj, Insaf	Mahmoud Darwish, Shahabaz Aman	
2015	KEF 1126 - Malayalam Sufi Route	Narakathil Theeyilla	Shahabaz Aman, Santhi Bijibal, Soumya Ramakrishnan, Amal Antony Augustin, Swetha, Deepa Anjali, KJ Anitha, KJ Manoj, Insaf	Shahabaz Aman	
2015	KEF 1126 - Malayalam Sufi Route	Mizhikalil	Shahabaz Aman, Santhi Bijibal, Soumya Ramakrishnan, Amal Antony Augustin, Swetha, Deepa Anjali, KJ Anitha, KJ Manoj, Insaf	Shahabaz Aman	
2015	KEF 1126 - Malayalam Sufi Route	Oru Rathri	Shahabaz Aman, Santhi Bijibal, Soumya Ramakrishnan, Amal Antony Augustin, Swetha, Deepa Anjali, KJ Anitha, KJ Manoj, Insaf	Shahabaz Aman	
2015	KEF 1126 - Malayalam Sufi Route	Thedi Thedi	Shahabaz Aman, Santhi Bijibal, Soumya Ramakrishnan, Amal Antony Augustin, Swetha, Deepa Anjali, KJ Anitha, KJ Manoj, Insaf	Shahabaz Aman	

=== Movie soundtracks ===
Year	Film	Track listing	Notes
2004	Athu Mandara Poovalla	1. "Ekantha Sandhyayil"; 2. "Orthirikkatheyoru"	Debut movie as Composer; Unreleased film
2007	Paradesi	1. "Ya Dhuni Dhuni"	First film released
2008	Pakal Nakshatrangal	1. "Pakaruka Nee"; 2. "Anuragamay"	
2011	Indian Rupee	1. "Ee Puzhayum"; 2. "Pokayayi"; 3. "Anthimanam"; 4. "Ee Puzhayum (Unplugged)	Also composed Background Score
2012	Spirit	1. "Ee Chillayil Ninnu"; 2. "Mazhakondu Mathram"; 3. "Maranamethunna Nerathu"	Also composed Background Score
2012	Shutter	1. "Ee Rathriyil"	
2012	Bavuttiyude Namathil	1. "Allahu"; 2. "Pakalakannu Doore"	Also composed Background Score
2013	Rose Guitarinaal	1. "Engum Nalla Pookkal"; 2. "Moonga"; 3. "Chuttivarum Kaatte"; 4. "Snehithane"; 5. "Ee Kaattilum"; 6. "Manjum Nilavum"; 7. "Karayalle Kunje"; 8. "Paavam Gayakan"	Also composed Background Score
2013	Kadal Kadannu Oru Maathukutty	1. "Rakshaka Nee"	
2014	Njan Steve Lopez	1. "Theruvukal Nee"; 2. "Muthupenne"; 3. "Ooraake Kalapila"; 4. "Chirakukal Njan"	
2014	Balyakala Sakhi	1. "Aa Nammalu Kandillenna"; 2. "Povukayaanu Njan"; 3. "Veendum Thalir Podinjuvo"; 4. "Kodhay Seshabhoomi"	
2017	Mayaanadhi	1. "Mizhiyil Ninnum"; 2. "Kaattil"	Co-Composed and produced by Rex Vijayan
2018	Sudani from Nigeria	1. "Kurrah"	Music produced by Rex Vijayan
2019	Thamaasha	1. "Paadi Njan"	Music produced by Rex Vijayan
2020	Halal Love Story	1. "Sundaranayavane"; 2. "Bismillah"	Music produced by Rex Vijayan
2020	Pakshikalkku Parayanullathu	1. "Enno Marannitta"	
2023	Thuramukham	1. "Aadam Mala"	
2023	Uschool	1. "Ore Mukham"	

=== Singles ===
Year	Song	Co-singer(s)	Lyrics
2020	Manassinte Madrassa	Sithara Krishnakumar	Anwar Ali
2021	Ninte Maarivilkickinu (Tribute to Diego Maradona)		Subhash Chandran
2021	Rathriyil Aval		Himself
2021	Sajnee Sajnee		Himself
2022	Pennennum Aanennum	Gayatri Asokan	Himself

=== As playback singer ===
Year	Song	Movie	Co-singer(s)	Music director/ Composer	Notes
2005	Chaanthu Kudanjoru	Chanthupottu	Sujatha Mohan	Vidyasagar	
2006	Kuyilukale Thuyilunaroo	Oruvan		Ouseppachan	
2007	Ishtamalle	Chocolate (2007 film)		Alex Paul	
2008	Enthorishtamanu Enikku	Parunthu		Alex Paul	
2008	Anuraagamaay	Pakal Nakshatrangal		Himself	
2012	Mele Mohavaanam	Da Thadiya	Najim Arshad	Bijibal	
2012	Allaahu	Bavuttiyude Namathil		Himself	
2013	Kaayalinarike	Annayum Rasoolum		Mehaboob / K	
2013	Kandu Randu Kannu	Annayum Rasoolum		MS Baburaj/ K	
2013	Zamilooni	Annayum Rasoolum		K	
2013	Ee Raathriyil	Shutter		Himself	
2013	Ee Kaattilum	Rose Guitarinaal		Himself	
2013	Kizhakku Kizhakku	Daivathinte Swantham Cleetus		Bijibal	
2013	Oru Mezhuthiriyude	Vishudhan	Mridula Warrier	Gopi Sunder	
2014	Manassin Thinkale	Vikramadithyan		Bijibal	
2014	Aa Nammalu Kandeelenna	Balyakalasakhi (2014 film)	Pushpavathy Poypadathu	Himself	
2014	Povukayaanu Njan	Balyakalasakhi (2014 film)	Ustad Faiyaz Khan	Himself	
2015	Kanakamylanji	Loham	Mythili	Sreevalsan J Menon	
2015	Mohabath	Double Barrel	Preethi Pillai	Prashant Pillai	
2015	Pathemari	Pathemari		Bijibal	
2017	Midukki Midukki	Cappuccino		K. Raghavan/Bipin Ashok	
2017	Mizhiyil ninnum	Mayaanadhi		Himself/ Music produced by Rex Vijayan	Won Kerala State Film Award for Best Singer for 2018
2017	Kaatil	Mayaanadhi		Himself/ Music produced by Rex Vijayan	
2018	Kurrah (Football Song)	Sudani from Nigeria		Himself/ Music produced by Rex Vijayan	
2019	Paadi Njan	Thamaasha		Himself/ Music produced by Rex Vijayan	
2019	Koodozhinja	Eelam		Ramesh Narayan	
2019	Pakalanthi Njan	Muhabbathin Kunjabdulla		Kozhikode Abubacker	
2019	Beema Palli Song	Pathinettam Padi	Nakul Abhyankar, Haricharan Seshadri	A.H. Kashif	
2019	Vandu Njan	Valiyaperunnal		Rex Vijayan	
2020	Smaranakal	Bhoomiyile Manohara Swakaryam	Sithara Krishnakumar	Sachin Balu	
2020	Enno Marannitta	Pakshikalkku Parayanullathu		Himself	
2020	Bismillah	Halal Love Story		Himself/ Music produced by Rex Vijayan	
2020	Sundaranayavane	Halal Love Story		Himself/ Music produced by Rex Vijayan	Won Kerala State Film Award for Best Singer for 2020
2021	Aakashamayavale	Vellam		Bijibal	Won Kerala State Film Award for Best Singer for 2020
2021	Aaraarum Kaanathe	Malik		Sushin Shyam	
2021	Ninnanu Bittu	Premam Poojyam		Dr. Ragavendra	
2022	Thanichakumee	Kallan D'Souza		Prashanth Karma	
2022	Keda Kanalukal	Appan		Dawn Vincent	
2022	Adalodakam	Nna Thaan Case Kodu	Soumya Ramakrishnan	Dawn Vincent	
2022	Melle En Pranayam	Panthrandu		Alphons Joseph	
2022	Vaanathiril Mizhi	Panthrandu	Alphons Joseph	Alphons Joseph	
2022	Kaattukal	Padavettu		Govind Vasantha	
2022	Maama Chayael Urumbu	Peace		Jubair Muhammed	
2022	Mounamaanakettum	Heaven		Gopi Sundar	
2023	Ormakal	Momo In Dubai		Gafoor M. Khayyam	
2023	Puthuthayorithu	Iratta		Jakes Bejoy	
2023	Jeevithamenna Thamasha	Vaathil	Fejo	Sejo John	
2023	Adam Mala	Thuramukham		Himself	
2023	Ekanthathayude Mahatheeram	Neelavelicham		M. S. Baburaj	Remixed and rearranged by Bijibal and Rex Vijayan
2023	Thamasamenthe Varuvan	Neelavelicham		M. S. Baburaj	Remixed and rearranged by Bijibal and Rex Vijayan
2023	Ore pakal	Pookkaalam	K. S. Chithra	Sachin Warrier	
2023	Ore Mukham	Uschool		Himself	

=== Miscellaneous ===
Year	Song	Album	Co-singer(s)	Music
2008	Kudajadriyil	Moham	Swarnalatha	Mansoor Ahammed
2008	Naadhaa	The Faith		Sadeesh Bichu
2008	En Saarike	Amritha Geetham		Yamuna Palat
2008	Unaroo Neeyen	Amritha Geetham		Yamuna Palat
2009	Aarorumillathoree	Shararanthal		Muhsin Kurikkal
2009	Kanneer Kalarnnoru	Shararanthal		Muhsin Kurikkal
2009	Ormayil	Shararanthal		Muhsin Kurikkal

=== As lyricist ===
Year	Song(s)	Movie/Album	Notes
1997	All songs	Ashiyana: The New Generation Malabari Songs	
2004	Sajnee	Soul of Anamika in Black and White	
2004	Vedanakal	Soul of Anamika in Black and White	
2004	Oh Nilave	Soul of Anamika in Black and White	
2004	Sagara Seema	Soul of Anamika in Black and White	
2004	Manjil	Soul of Anamika in Black and White	
2005	Neeyum Nilavum	Neeyum Nilavum	
2005	Nilavil Sada	Neeyum Nilavum	
2011	Sajnee	Sajnee	
2013	Ee Rathriyil	Shutter	Translation of Veinte poemas de amor by Pablo Neruda
2013	Snehithane	Rose Guitarinaal	
2013	Ee Kaattilum	Rose Guitarinaal	
2013	Engum Nalla Pookkal	Rose Guitarinaal	
2013	Karayalle	Rose Guitarinaal	
2013	Moonga	Rose Guitarinaal	
2013	Paavam Gayakan	Rose Guitarinaal	
2013	Chuttivarum kaatte	Rose Guitarinaal	
2015	Narakathil Theeyilla	KEF 1126	
2015	Darvesh	KEF 1126	Translation of State of Siege by Mahmoud Darwish
2015	Mizhikalil	KEF 1126	
2015	Thedi Thedi	KEF 1126	
2015	Oru Rathri	KEF 1126	
2018	Kurrah	Sudani from Nigeria	
2021	Rathriyil Aval	Single	
2021	Perunnal Patt - Cherupayar Payasam	Music Video	

=== Remix albums ===
Year	Album	Notes
2021	KEF 1126 - Malayalam Sufi Route (2021 Remix)	Remixed and Re-arranged by Rex Vijayan

== Awards ==
Year	Award	Category	Film/Album/Song	Notes
2013	Vanitha Film Awards	Best Male Singer	Kaayalinarike (Annayum Rasoolum)	
2018	Kerala State Film Awards	Best Singer	Mizhiyil Ninnum (Mayaanadhi)	
2018	Filmfare Awards South	Best Male Playback Singer	Mizhiyil Ninnum (Mayaanadhi)	
2018	Movie Street Film Awards	Best Playback Singer (Male)	Mizhiyil Ninnum (Mayaanadhi)	
2018	Asianet Film Awards	Best Playback Singer	Mizhiyil Ninnum (Mayaanadhi)	
2020	Kerala State Film Awards	Best Singer	Sundaranayavane (Halal Love Story)	
2020	Kerala State Film Awards	Best Singer	Aakshamayavale (Vellam)	

== See also ==
- Kerala State Film Award for Best Singer
