= Soubin Shahir =

Indian film actor, director and producer (born 1983)

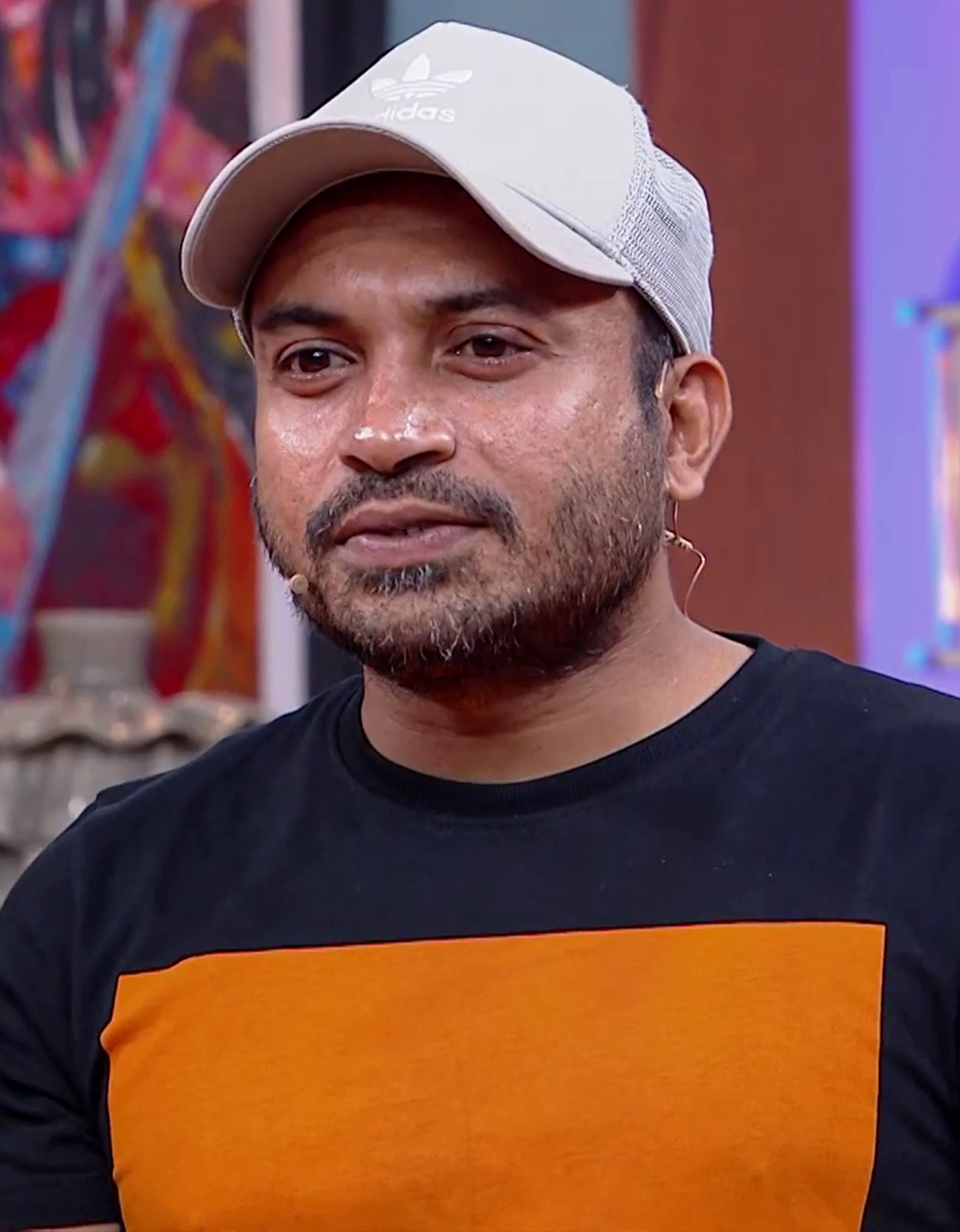
- Soubin in 2019
- Born: 12 October 1983 (age 43); Fort Kochi, Kerala, India
- Occupations: Actor; writer; director; Producer
- Years active: 1992–present
- Height: 168 cm (5 ft 6 in)
- Spouse: Jamia Zaheer (m. 2017)
- Children: 1

Soubin Shahir (born 12 October 1983) is an Indian actor, director and producer who primarily works in Malayalam films. He made his acting debut with Annayum Rasoolum (2013). Following his breakthrough with Premam (2015), he played the lead in Sudani from Nigeria (2018), which won him the Kerala State Film Award for Best Actor. Soubin's notable roles came with the commercially successful films Kumbalangi Nights (2019) and Manjummel Boys (2024).

== Early life ==
Soubin was born and raised in Fort Kochi, Kerala, India. He has a brother and sister. His father Babu Shahir was an assistant director and production controller who had worked in films such as Manichithrathazhu, Godfather, In Harihar Nagar among others.

== Career ==
Soubin started his film career as an assistant director in the industry with Fazil's Kaiyethum Doorath (2002) in which he also worked as an actor. He also worked as an assistant director for Siddique's Chronic Bachelor (2003). He assisted directors like Rafi-Mecartin, P. Sukumar, Santhosh Sivan, Rajeev Ravi, and Amal Neerad. He got a breakthrough role with Alphonse Putharen's Premam (2015) where he played the role of a PT teacher. This led to his popularity as an actor in the industry. His popular roles include in films Charlie (2015), Maheshinte Prathikaaram (2016), Kali (2016), Darvinte Parinamam (2016), Kammatipaadam (2016), Anuraga Karikkin Vellam (2016), Mayanadhi (2017), Comrade in America – CIA (2017), and Kumbalangi Nights. His first full lead role was in the film Sudani from Nigeria (2018) for which he won the Kerala State Film Award for Best Actor.

In 2024, he played the part of Siju David aka "Kuttan" in Manjummel Boys. He also produced the movie. It went on to receive critical acclaim and set several box-office records, becoming the highest grossing Malayalam film, and the first film from the industry to earn more than ₹200 crore. He was arrested on 7 July 2025, in connection with a ₹7 crore financial fraud case related to the film. The arrest was procedural following a summons for questioning, and he was released shortly after on anticipatory bail granted by the Kerala High Court. The case was filed by a UAE-based investor, Siraj Valiyathura Hameed, who alleged that despite investing ₹7 crore under a profit-sharing agreement promising 40% of the film's earnings, he received only a small fraction of the returns after the film's huge commercial success. The police have charged Soubin and his associates with cheating, criminal breach of trust, and misappropriation of funds, and the investigation is ongoing.

He is also a partner in Parava Films, a production company that has produced hits like Manjummel Boys.

In 2025, Coolie marked his first full-length role appearance in Tamil cinema. His acting and dancing in the song "Monica" was well received.

== Media image ==
Soubin's performance in Kumbalangi Nights is regarded as one of the "100 Greatest Performances of the Decade" by Film Companion.

== Personal life ==
On 16 December 2017, he married his fiancée Jamia Zaheer. Jamia is a marketing professional, based in Kochi. The couple has a son born in May 2019.

== Filmography ==
Key
†	Denotes films that have not yet been released

=== As actor ===
Year	Title	Role	Notes
1992	Vietnam Colony		Child artist
1992	Pappayude Swantham Appoos		Child artist
1993	Kabooliwala		Child artist
2002	Kaiyethum Doorath	Bus Passenger	Cameo appearance
2005	Pandipada	Peacock Man in Function	Cameo appearance
2010	Body Guard	College Student	Cameo appearance
2011	Urumi	Tribal Gang Member	
2012	Da Thadiya	Himself	Cameo appearance
2013	Annayum Rasoolum	Collin	
2013	Kadal Kadannoru Mathukkutty	Mattanchery Martin	
2013	5 Sundarikal	Poovalan	Anthology film; Segment: Kullante Bharya
2014	Masala Republic	Althaf	
2014	Iyobinte Pusthakam	Ivan's Henchman	
2015	Chandrettan Evideya	Sumesh	
2015	Premam	Shivan Sir	
2015	Loham	Street Rowdy	
2015	Rani Padmini	Madan	
2015	Charlie	Sunikuttan	
2016	Maheshinte Prathikaaram	Crispin	
2016	Hello Namasthe	Abu	
2016	Kali	Prakashan	
2016	Darvinte Parinamam	Willy	
2016	Mudhugauv	Kumari	
2016	Kammatipaadam	Karate Biju	
2016	Happy Wedding	Matrimony Consultant	
2016	Anuraga Karikkin Vellam	Fakru/Fakrudheen	
2016	Popcorn	Milton	
2017	Comrade in America – CIA	Joemon	
2017	Achayans	Qi	
2017	Parava	Director	Cameo appearance; directorial debut
2017	Solo	Pattu	
2017	Solo	Shekhar's friend at his birthday party	Tamil film; special appearance in the song "Thoovanam"
2017	Mayaanadhi	Sameera's Ikka	Cameo appearance
2018	Street Lights	Subin	
2018	Carbon	Aanakkaran Rajesh	
2018	Rosapoo	Sajeer	
2018	Sudani from Nigeria	Majeed	
2018	Kuttanadan Marpappa	Freddy	
2018	Mohanlal	Mr. Who	
2018	Mangalyam Thanthunanena	Himself	Special appearance
2019	Kumbalangi Nights	Saji	
2019	Mera Naam Shaji	Shaji	
2019	Oru Yamandan Premakadha	Vicky	
2019	Virus	Unnikrishnan	
2019	Ambili	Ambili	
2019	Vikruthi	Sameer	
2019	Android Kunjappan Version 5.25	Subramanian / Chuppan	
2019	Valiyaperunnal	Hanumanth Sheonayi	
2020	Trance	Mathew Thomas (Mathaai)	
2020	Halal Love Story	Azad	
2021	Irul	Alex	
2021	Meow	Dusthackeer	
2021	Churuli	Mayiladumparambil Joy	
2022	Bro Daddy	Happy Pinto	
2022	Kallan D`Souza	D’Souza	
2022	Bheeshma Parvam	Ajas Ali	
2022	Third World Boys	Soubin	
2022	CBI 5: The Brain	Paul Meijo / Sandeep / Manzoor	
2022	Jack N' Jill	Kuttaps	
2022	Ela Veezha Poonchira	PC Madhu	
2022	Gold	Mittu	
2023	Djinn	Dhanapalan	
2023	Romancham	Jibin Madhavan	
2023	Vellari Pattanam	K.P Suresh	
2023	Ayalvaashi	Thaju	
2023	Live	Sriram	
2023	King of Kotha	Suitcase Leslie	Cameo appearance
2024	Manjummel Boys	Siju David "Kuttan"	Also producer
2024	Nadikar	Bala	
2025	Pravinkoodu Shappu	Kannan	
2025	Machante Maalakha	Sajeevan	
2025	Coolie	Dayalan "Dayal"/Dilip	Tamil film
2025	Lokah Chapter 1: Chandra	Unnamed	Cameo appearance
2025	Paathirathri	CPO Hareesh	
2026	Khalifa: The Ruler	Ahmed Ali's right-hand	Cameo appearance
2026	Bachelor Party D'eux	Dani	

=== As voice actor ===
Year	Title	Role	Notes
2023	Valatty	Haridas/Karidas	

=== As director ===
List of films directed
Year	Title	Production company	Notes
2017	Parava	Anwar Rasheed Entertainments	Debut as a director

=== As producer ===
List of films produced
Year	Title	Production company	Notes
2024	Manjummel Boys	Parava Films	Debut production

== Accolades ==
- 2018: Asianet Film Award Special Jury Mention – Udaharanam Sujatha & Parava.
- 2018: Vanitha Film Award for Best Debut Director – Parava.
- 2019: Kerala State Film Award for Best Actor – Sudani from Nigeria
- 2019: Filmfare Critics Award for Best Actor – Malayalam – Sudani from Nigeria
- 2020: Asianet Film Award for Best Actor (Special Jury Mention) – Kumbalangi Nights.
- 2020: Vanitha Film Award for Best Supporting Actor – Kumbalangi Nights.
- 2024 : Kerala State Film Award for Best Film - Manjummel Boys
- 2024 : Kerala State Film Award for Best Character Actor - Manjummel Boys

== Controversy ==
On July 2024, The Enforcement Directorate is investigating money laundering allegations related to the Malayalam movie Manjummel Boys. A case has been registered, and notices have been issued to the film's producers and actors Soubin Shahir, Babu Shahir, and Shawn Antony.
