= Kumbalangi Nights (soundtrack) =

Soundtrack album by Sushin Shyam
- Released: 21 January 2019
- Recorded: 2018–2019
- Studios: My Studio, Kochi
- Genre: Feature film soundtrack
- Length: 21:55
- Languages: Malayalam, English
- Label: Bhavana Studios
- Producer: Sushin Shyam

Sushin Shyam chronology
Varathan (2018)	Kumbalangi Nights (2019)	Virus (2019)
External audio
- Audio Jukebox on YouTube

Kumbalangi Nights is the soundtrack album for the 2019 Malayalam-language drama film of the same name. The film, directed by Madhu C. Narayanan in his directorial debut, features musical score composed by Sushin Shyam with the soundtrack accompanied for the film has seven songs in number. The Malayalam lyrics were penned by Anwar Ali and Vinayak Sasikumar, while the English songs featured in the album were penned by Nezer Ahamed, Shyam's bandmate in The Down Troddence rock musical band. Shyam, Sithara Krishnakumar, Sooraj Santhosh, Anne Amie, Kezia Quintal (K.Zia), Akhil Unnikrishnan a.k.a. AKEL and Yadav gave vocals for the tracks featured in the album.

The soundtrack is influenced by Italian music and consisted of various genres and moods being incorporated. It was released on 21 January 2019 by the film production company, Bhavana Studios, which distributed and released the film and its soundtrack in their first production venture. The score and album received unanimous positive response from critics, appreciating Sushin Shyam for his compositions and tunes, while being considered as his career's best and Shyam won the Kerala State Film Award for Best Music Director for his work in the film.

== Background and production ==
"With a film of this nature, it was quite difficult to take a call on where to place the songs. Naturally, you become a little concerned about your music affecting the mood of the film or people not responding to it well."

— Sushin Shyam, on the composition of Kumbalangi Nights' soundtrack.

According to Shyam, composing for the Kumbalangi Nights' soundtrack was challenging; he was unsure about the need of songs in the film's screenplay, considering Madhu's filmmaking, since he earlier assisted Dileesh Pothan in Thondimuthalum Driksakshiyum (2017). Sushin's work in the film was different from the previous films as during the story discussions with Madhu, the complete storyline was not narrated within one shot, but a step-by-step narration of particular situations as per script development. "Cherathukal" was the first song that was narrated to Shyam initially and was recorded within a single take. The songs went through several improvisations to accommodate the changes in the script.

Shyam stated that the soundtrack for the film has "feel good vibes" as it begins with a warm and contemplative range, to light and breezy songs in the end. It also consisted of various genres ranging from jazz, pop, electronic dance, trance, gospel and melancholy. The song "Silent Cat", which in the movie is shown as a love song by an American tourist, was sung by German-based artist Kezia Quental, also known as K.Zia.

In an interview, Shyam said that he was influenced by Italian music while making the album. During his days in the band, he shared his experiences on going to Italy and the mood of the songs being generated on his perception about the place, and also owing to the similarities he found between the city of Venice and Kumbalangi, in themes and culture. While all the songs are being composed in mind with the story and setting, the romantic number "Uyiril Thodum" was composed in the intention to make the track commercially successful.

== Track listing ==
No.	Title	Lyrics	Singer(s)	Length
1.	"Cherathukal"	Anwar Ali	Sushin Shyam, Sithara Krishnakumar	3:41
2.	"Ezhutha Katha"	Vinayak Sasikumar	Sushin Shyam	3:53
3.	"Silent Cat"	Nezer Ahemed	K. Zia	2:24
4.	"Uyiril Thodum"	Anwar Ali	Sooraj Santhosh, Anne Amie	3:53
5.	"Don't Fall"	Nezer Ahemed	Akhil Unnikrishnan	1:32
6.	"Thillele" (Irular Tribe Festival Song)	Traditional	Yadav	3:48
7.	"Lagoon Chill"	Nezer Ahemed	Sushin Shyam	2:44
Total length:				21:55

== Reception ==
The soundtrack and score received positive reviews, praising Shyam for his work in the album. Vipin Nair of Music Aloud gave 4 stars (out of 5) and said Shyam "delivered his best soundtrack yet". In his review for A Humming Heart, Ashwin Vinayan gave 9 stars (out of 10) and said "Kumbalangi Nights is inarguably his [Shyam's] career best effort. The musician must currently be enjoying the imprimatur of all the artists who might have ever influenced and inspired him [...] the soundtrack could well go down to be the year’s best. Then again considering the attention to music in Malayalam cinema, it will be a surprise if something better doesn’t drop." and further called it as "a truly global soundtrack". Writing for Scroll.in, Rineeta Naik had stated "Sushin Shyam produces a memorable soundtrack for the story of four brothers living in a decrepit home framed by gleaming backwaters. The film deserves all of its accolades and so does the soundtrack."

The Times of India-based critic praised the song "Cherathukal" saying that "The song holds an emotion which is very hard to be fragmented. The symbolic representation of the elements, the accuracy of executing the emotion in the lyrics, will make you want to see the movie again". Another review from the website, reviewing for the track "Ezhutha Kadha" said that "The song is so soothing and beautiful that rejuvenates the soul and it could let you refresh the whole day." Sarath Ramesh Kuniyl, in the film review written for The Week, had said that the film is complemented well by Sushin Shyam's music, which he opined that "it comes and goes like the sea waves on the beach, and it feels just great".

Ankit Sinha, while analysing the track "Cherathukal" in his review for Film Companion had said that it depicts the sloth, indifference, repartee, pain and emptiness that envelopes the dysfunctional family in the film. He further opined that "Cherathukal becomes a beautiful dream on film only because we see the thorns of reality adorning it before the song, uniting us with the depths of this family’s heart, preparing us on our way to watching them come in harmony with each other again".

== Accolades ==
Award (Note: Awards, festivals and organizations are in alphabetical order.)	Date of ceremony (Note: Date is linked to the article about the awards held that year, wherever possible.)	Category	Recipient(s)	Result	Ref.
CPC Cine Awards	16 February 2020	Best Background Score	Sushin Shyam	Won	
CPC Cine Awards	16 February 2020	Best Original Song	"Cherathukal" by Sushin Shyam, Anwar Ali and Sithara Krishnakumar	Won	
Kerala State Film Awards	13 October 2020	Best Music Director	Sushin Shyam	Won	
South Indian International Movie Awards	18 September 2021	Best Music Director – Malayalam	Sushin Shyam	Won	
South Indian International Movie Awards	18 September 2021	Best Lyricist – Malayalam	Anwar Ali – ("Cherathukal")	Nominated	
South Indian International Movie Awards	18 September 2021	Best Female Playback Singer – Malayalam	Sithara Krishnakumar – ("Cherathukal")	Nominated	

== Legacy ==
The soundtrack received appreciation from music critics and being called as one of the composer's best works till date. It also received praise from celebrities alike. Arijit Singh shared the video of the song "Cherathukal" in his Facebook page and called it as a "masterpiece", and the singer Sithara Krishnakumar appreciated Singh for his review on the track. In an interview, actress Parvathy Thiruvothu expressed her desire to sing the track "Cherathukal", with a brief apology to Sithara. Actor Ayushmann Khurrana shared a story of the song "Uyiril Thodum" and appreciated the soundtrack.
