= Unnimaya Prasad =

Indian actress

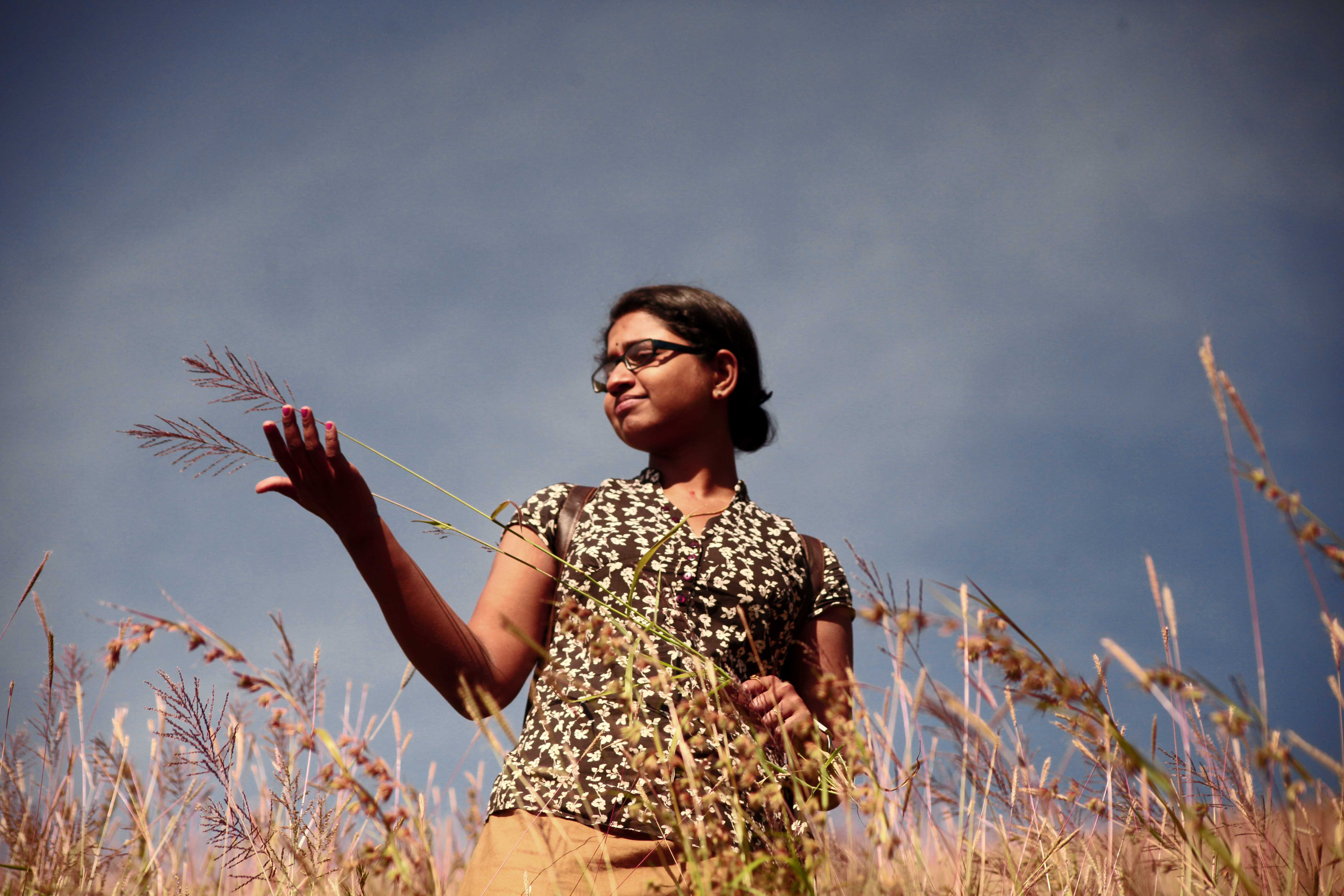
- Born: Kochi, Kerala, India
- Occupations: Actress; Assistant Director; Architect; Producer
- Years active: 2013–present
- Spouse: Syam Pushkaran (m. 2012)

Unnimaya Prasad is an Indian actress, assistant director and producer who works in Malayalam cinema. She worked as the casting director of Maheshinte Prathikaram (2016).

== Early life ==
Born and brought up in Kochi, Unnimaya studied architecture at the College of Engineering, Thiruvananthapuram,

== Personal life ==
She is married to screenwriter and producer Syam Pushkaran.

== Career ==
She debuted as an actress with the part Sethulakshmi in the anthology film 5 Sundarikal. Her portrayal of a class teacher in a minor role in Soubin Shahir's Parava. She played the central character of Deputy Commissioner of Police Catherine Maria in Anjaam Pathiraa (2020). She has acted in minor roles in movies including Maheshinte Prathikaaram (2016), Mayanadi (2017), Varathan (2018), Oru Kuprasidha Payyan (2018), and Virus (2019).

She worked as the casting director of Maheshinte Prathikaram and assistant director of Mayanadi (2017), Thondimuthalum Driksakshiyum and Kumbalangi Nights (2019).

Her performance in Joji won her the Best Character Actress award in 52nd Kerala State Film Awards.

== Filmography ==
Key
†	Denotes films that have not yet been released

- All films are in Malayalam language unless otherwise noted.

=== As actress ===
Year	Title	Role	Notes
2013	5 Sundarikal	School teacher	Segment:Sethulakshmi
2016	Maheshinte Prathikaaram	Sara	
2016	Anuraga Karikkin Vellam	Thanka's (Sudhi Koppa) wife	
2017	Thondimuthalum Driksakshiyum	Thaatha (woman in bus)	
2017	Parava	Maya teacher	
2017	Mayaanadhi	Assistant director / Herself	
2018	Varathan	Preman's mother	
2018	Oru Kuprasidha Payyan	Adv. Vanaja Prakash	
2018	French Viplavam	Patta's wife	
2019	Virus	Dr. Nirmala	
2020	Anjaam Pathiraa	DCP Catherine Mariya	
2020	Trance	Shani	
2020	Halal Love Story	Siraj's wife	
2021	Joji	Bincy	Won - Kerala State Film Award for Best Character Actress
2022	Pada	Mini K.S.	
2022	Nna Thaan Case Kodu	Chief Minister Deepa	
2022	Palthu Janwar	Prasoon's sister	
2023	Sesham Mike-il Fathima	Deepika	
2024	Thundu	Seena	
2024	Rifle Club	Sisily Avaran	
2025	Lovely		
2026	Karuppu	Inspector Thangameena	Tamil film
2026	Pradhama Drishtiya Kuttakkar	CPO Divya Abhilash	

=== As Assistant director ===
Year	Title	Notes
2016	Maheshinte Prathikaaram	Also casting director
2017	Mayaanadhi	
2017	Thondimuthalum Driksakshiyum	
2019	Kumbalangi Nights	

=== As Executive producer ===
Year	Film	Notes	Director
2021	Joji	Also actress (as Bincy)	Dileesh Pothan
