= Kappela =

- Theatrical release poster
- Directed by: Muhammad Musthafa
- Written by: Muhammad Musthafa
- Produced by: Vishnu Venu
- Starring: Anna Ben; Sreenath Bhasi; Roshan Mathew
- Cinematography: Jimshi Khalid
- Edited by: Noufal Abdullah
- Music by: Sushin Shyam
- Production company: Kadhaas Untold
- Distributed by: Local Theatres; Netflix
- Release dates: 6 March 2020 (Theatrical); 22 June 2020 (Netflix)
- Running time: 113 minutes
- Country: India
- Language: Malayalam

Kappela (transl. Chapel) is a 2020 Indian Malayalam-language action thriller film written and directed by Muhammad Musthafa (in his directorial debut). The movie was produced by Vishnu Venu under his banner Kadhaas Untold. Starring Anna Ben, Sreenath Bhasi, and Roshan Mathew. The music was composed by Sushin Shyam. The plot follows a phone call romance between an auto rickshaw driver, Vishnu, and a village girl, Jessy, who have never met each other. The film received positive reviews for its social message and the cast's performance. After the success of the film, it was remade in Telugu as Butta Bomma, which marks the Telugu debut of Surya Vasishta and Arjun Das.

== Plot ==
Jessy (Anna Ben) is the eldest of two daughters in a modest family in Poovaranmala, a rural area of Wayanad. The lower-middle-class family survives through farming, while Jessy’s mother Mary (Nisha Sarang) earns extra income by sewing. Having left her studies, Jessy helps with household chores and embroidery work. Benny (Sudhi Koppa), who has recently opened a textile shop, develops an interest in her.

One day, while trying to call a client about a clothing measurement, Jessy dials the wrong number and accidentally reaches Vishnu (Roshan Mathew), an auto-rickshaw driver in Kozhikode. A series of calls follow due to the initial confusion, and the two gradually become friends. Vishnu appears kind-hearted and considerate, and Jessy slowly falls in love with him—despite never having seen him, not even in a photograph.

Meanwhile, Jessy’s parents begin searching for a groom. After Benny’s family visits, the marriage alliance is approved by both families, though Benny’s mother initially hesitates. Shocked and saddened, Jessy decides to tell her parents about Vishnu. But before she can do that, she wants to meet him in person. She arranges to visit him in Kozhikode.

When Jessy arrives in the city, Vishnu heads to the bus station to pick her up, but his phone is stolen. A young man named Roy (Sreenath Bhasi), a jobless troublemaker, witnesses the theft, catches the thief, and takes possession of the phone.

As Jessy keeps calling to locate Vishnu, Roy answers and pretends to be him. Since Jessy has never seen Vishnu, she believes Roy and meets him. Moments later, the real Vishnu arrives and identifies Jessy with help from the bus driver. Realizing he is about to be exposed, Roy flees.

Jessy finally meets the real Vishnu, and they spend some time talking. However, they soon notice Roy following them. Vishnu confronts him, which leads to a fight. Roy is injured during the scuffle, and Jessy’s clothes get stained, prompting Jessy and Vishnu to check into a hotel so she can wash them. Roy, angered, calls his friends for help.

Vishnu turns out to be a human trafficker planning to sell Jessy. Noticing suspicious signs, Jessy attempts to escape, but Vishnu stops her and tries to assault her. She fights back and locks herself in the bathroom.

Meanwhile, Roy and his friend track them down. They burst into the room, attack Vishnu, and rescue Jessy. Vishnu is seriously injured in the fight, and Jessy escapes with Roy.

It is then revealed that after answering Jessy’s call earlier, Roy realized she was about to meet a total stranger for the first time. Concerned for her safety, he followed her throughout the day—and ultimately saved her at the hotel.

Jessy later returns home safely and agrees to Benny’s proposal.

== Cast ==
- Anna Ben as Jessy
- Sreenath Bhasi as Andikannan
- Roshan Mathew as Vishnu
- Sudhi Koppa as Benny
- Tanvi Ram as Annie, Roy's cousin
- Vijilesh Karayad as Riyas, Roy's friend
- Nisha Sarang as Mary, Jessy's mother
- James Eliya as Varghese, Jessy's father
- Nilja K Baby as Lakshmi, Jessy's friend, Neighbour Girl
- Muhammad Musthafa as Abu
- Sudheesh as Father Gabriel
- Salam Bappu Palapetty
- Navas Vallikkunnu
- Mohammed Eravattoor as Murali
- Jolly Chirayath as Saramma
- Naseer Sankranthi as Martin
- Smitha Ambu as Saleena
- Aswani as my sundari

== Production ==
Kappela was the directorial debut of actor Muhammad Musthafa, who was also the writer and has appeared in a role in the film. The film was produced by Vishnu Venu through the production company Kadhaas Untold. Jimshi Khalid was the cinematographer and Sushin Shyam composed the music. The film was shot in Poovaranthode, Thenjippalam, Alungal, and Chelapram, Kozhikode.

== Accolades ==
Kappela was selected in International Film Festival of India (Indian Panorama-2020) and In International Film Festival of Kerala-2020 (Malayalam Cinema Today Section). Anna Ben won the Best Actress Award and Musthafa won the best debut director award in the 51st Kerala State Film Awards. Anna Ben won the SIIMA Award for Best Actress- Critics Choice for her role in 2021 and producer Vishnu Venu won best debut producer award. Anees Nadodi won the National Award for best production design at the 68th National Film Awards.

== Soundtrack ==
Kappela

Soundtrack album by Sushin Shyam
- Released: 21 March 2020
- Genre: Feature film soundtrack
- Length: 5:02
- Label: Millennium Audios
- Producer: Sushin Shyam

Sushin Shyam chronology
Anjaam Pathiraa (2020)	Kappela (2020)	Mālik (2020)
External audio
- Audio Jukebox on YouTube

The music of the film was composed by Sushin Shyam with lyrics penned by Vishnu Shobhana.

List of songs
No.	Title	Lyrics	Singer(s)	Length
1.	"Kannil Vidarum"	Vishnu Shobhana	Sooraj Santhosh, Swetha Mohan	03:25
2.	"Kadukumanikkoru"	Vishnu Shobhana	Sithara Krishnakumar	01:35
3.	"Dooram theerum neram"	Vinayak Sasikumar	Aavani Malhar	02:48
Total length:				05:02

== Release ==
The official trailer of the film was launched by Millennium Audios on 18 February 2020. The film was released in theatres on 6 March 2020 but could not continue its theatrical run due to the COVID-19 pandemic. Later on, the film was released through the online streaming platform Netflix on 22 June 2020. It was screened at 51st International Film Festival of India in January 2021 in Indian Panorama section.

=== Critical reception ===
The film received positive reviews from critics. Sajin Shrijith of The New Indian Express rated 4 in a scale of 5 and said that "Kappela is the latest entry from Malayalam cinema that joins the league of films that managed to create something brilliant out of minor incidents. It's yet another testament to the fact that focused writers and directors can do wonders regardless of the scale of the material". Gulf News wrote that "Kappela's writing and screenplay with well-sketched characters is its biggest strength. The narration is simple, the mood and tone rooted in reality, conversations are real as the story glides smoothly like a well-oiled machine lending a fly on the wall experience. [...] The casting is pitch perfect and lead actors Anna Ben, Roshan Mathew and Sreenath Bhasi are fantastic". Baradwaj Rangan of Film Companion South wrote "[These] parts of the film are pure pleasure because “nothing” really happens, and no one is better at capturing and conveying “nothingness” — the unremarkable everydayness of life — than the directors of the Malayalam film industry.".
