= Virus (2019 film) =

2019 film directed by Aashiq Abu

- Theatrical release poster
- Directed by: Aashiq Abu
- Written by: Muhsin Parari; Suhas-Sharfu
- Produced by: Aashiq Abu; Rima Kallingal
- Starring: Kunchacko Boban Indrajith Sukumaran Tovino Thomas Parvathy Thiruvothu Poornima Indrajith Sreenath Bhasi Rahman
- Cinematography: Rajeev Ravi; Additional Cinematography: Shyju Khalid
- Edited by: Saiju Sreedharan
- Music by: Sushin Shyam
- Production company: OPM Cinemas
- Distributed by: OPM Cinemas
- Release date: 7 June 2019
- Running time: 152 minutes
- Country: India
- Language: Malayalam

Virus is a 2019 Indian Malayalam-language survival medical thriller film co-produced and directed by Aashiq Abu set against the backdrop of the 2018 Nipah virus outbreak in Kerala. The film was written by Muhsin Parari and Suhas-Sharfu. It stars an ensemble cast consisting of Kunchacko Boban, Indrajith Sukumaran, Tovino Thomas, Poornima Indrajith, Parvathy Thiruvothu, Revathi, Rima Kallingal, Sreenath Bhasi, Rahman, Asif Ali and Madonna Sebastian.

Principal photography took place from January to February 2019 in a single schedule shot extensively in Government Medical College, Kozhikode and Government Homoeopathic Medical College, Kozhikode. The film was released worldwide on 7 June 2019, garnering critical acclaim and was a box office success. It was included in The Hindu's top 25 Malayalam films of the decade.

== Plot ==
Zakariya Mohammed is infected and brought to the Government Medical College, Kozhikode, where he suffers from the symptoms of an unknown virus and, after a few hours, dies. Geetha, who was taking Zakariya's CT scan, gets infected by the virus. The doctors and nurses are worried and confused by her constantly fluctuating blood pressure. A nurse Akhila who treated Zakariya gets infected too. Slowly more cases are identified in the surrounding areas. Dr. Salim (a neurologist) while checking on Zakariya's father, Razak, notices symptoms related to poisoning and Japanese encephalitis and other such infections. Dr. Salim also asked Dr. Suresh Rajan to conduct a sample test for Nipah virus. The samples were collected from Suhana, sister of Zakariya.

As the death toll begins to rise, Dr. Suresh Babu confirms the unknown virus to be Nipah. Nipah spreads across Kozhikode and the neighbouring districts. Sister Akhila (the nurse who treated Zakariya), dies after a long battle with the virus and before she died, she wrote a letter to her husband. The film progresses with real life experiences of people who we are aware of when it has happened and also creates a backstory for each affected patient and generates an interest in the narration.

In an emergency situation, a team of medical practitioners and healthcare professionals, led by the Health Minister of Kerala C. K. Prameela and District Collector Paul V. Abraham IAS, camp in Kozhikode to tackle the crisis. There is an attempt made to justify that this is not a bio-weapon used by any country or organisation. While the film is ending, the film pays tribute to scientists, medical professionals, hospital staff, volunteers and the people who came forward to support the team to solve the virus attack. Health minister, C. K. Prameela announces Kozhikode Nipah virus free. In the end, it is shown that Zakariya saw a flying fox (a breed of bats) that was on the ground. He went there and before coming in contact with the bat, he took a picture of the bat for his Instagram story.

== Cast ==
- Kunchacko Boban as Dr. Suresh Rajan
- Indrajith Sukumaran as Dr. Baburaj
- Tovino Thomas as Paul V. Abraham IAS (Based on U.V. Jose)
- Parvathy Thiruvothu as Dr. Annu
- Revathi as C. K. Prameela, Minister of Health, Kerala (Based on K. K. Shailaja)
- Poornima Indrajith as Dr. Smrithy Bhaskar, Director of Public Health
- Rahman as Dr. Salim
- Sreenath Bhasi as Dr. Abid Rahman
- Asif Ali as Vishnu Bhaskaran
- Madonna Sebastian as Dr. Sara Yakub, Abid's love interest
- Basil Joseph as Dr. Mithun
- Soubin Shahir as Unnikrishnan
- Joju George as Babu, an attender
- Remya Nambeesan as Raji, Babu's wife
- Darshana Rajendran as Anjali Vasudevan, Vishnu's wife
- Unnimaya Prasad as Dr. Nirmala
- Rima Kallingal as Akhila, a nurse (Based on Lini Puthussery)
- Sharafudheen as Sandeep, Akhila's husband
- Jinu Joseph as Dr. John Jacob, Annu's husband
- Lukman Avaran as Dr. Sajith
- Haris Saleem as Dr. Haris
- Indrans as Razak, Zakariya's father
- Zakariya Mohammed as Zakariya, the first patient
- Savithri Sreedharan as Jamleela, Zakariya's mother
- Dileesh Pothan as Prakashan
- Srikant Murali as Dr. Moopan
- Sudheesh as Health Inspector Radhakrishnan, Public Health Department
- Senthil Krishna as Excise Minister CP Bhaskar (Based on T. P. Ramakrishnan)
- Binu Pappu as Dr. Sudevan
- Sajitha Madathil as Dr. Sreedevi
- Sarasa Balussery as Khadeeja
- Ambika Rao as Head Nurse
- Divya Gopinath as Geetha
- Zeenath as Akhila's mother
- Leona Lishoy as Paul's wife
- Shebin Benson as Yahiya, Zakariya's brother
- Sreedevi Unni as Abid's mother
- Neeraja Rajendran as Unnikrishnan's mother
- Jolly Chirayath as Pradeep's mother
- Deepa Thomas as Junior Doctor
- Vaishakh Shankar as Vaishakh Nair
- Kottayam Ramesh as Medical College Superintendent
- Nilambur Ayisha as Application Agent at Medical College
- Kozhikode Jayaraj as Nasar, Zakariya's uncle
- Vettukili Prakash as Sadasivan
- Dileesh Nair as Shanthan Vaidyar
- Preethi Nambiar as Preethy Varma
- Ann Salim as Hafia
- Anjali as Suhana
- Noushad Ali as Vipin

== Production ==
The film is based on the 2018 Nipah virus outbreak in Kerala. Principal photography began in Kozhikode on 6 January 2019, Kalidas Jayaram was supposed to appear in the film in a supporting but pivotal role, but was replaced by Sreenath Bhasi after the former did not ultimately accept it. Virus was shot extensively in and around Government Medical College, Kozhikode. Filming wrapped on 26 February 2019 after 52 days shoot in a single schedule.

== Soundtrack ==
Virus

Soundtrack album by Sushin Shyam
- Released: 12 June 2019
- Recorded: 2019
- Genre: Feature film soundtrack
- Length: 56:12
- Label: OPM Records
- Producer: Sushin Shyam

Sushin Shyam chronology
Kumbalangi Nights (2019)	Virus (2019)	Driving Licence (2019)
External audio
- Audio Jukebox on YouTube

The original soundtrack is composed, programmed, and arranged by Sushin Shyam. The film features a promotional song titled "Spread Love" sung by Shelton Pinheiro, Madonna Sebastian, Muhsin Parari and Sushin Shyam, which was not included in the film, but was listed in the original soundtrack album, which features 17 instrumental numbers, which released on 17 May 2019.

Virus (Original Motion Picture Soundtrack)
No.	Title	Artist(s)	Length
1.	"Spread Love"	Shelton Pinheiro, Madonna Sebastian, Muhsin Parari, Sushin Shyam	03:38
2.	"Heal"		05:56
3.	"Orbit"		02:02
4.	"Virus"		02:48
5.	"Vision"		01:29
6.	"Outbreak"		02:12
7.	"Heroes"		03:33
8.	"Dharmam"		01:52
9.	"Humanity"		02:34
10.	"Roots"		05:09
11.	"Quest"		04:16
12.	"Spreading Rapidly"		04:37
13.	"Love for mother nature"		02:05
14.	"A departure without amends"		02:13
15.	"Consumed by fear"		01:28
16.	"Festering within"		01:14
17.	"The truth unfolding"		02:36
18.	"Rise"		06:21

== Release ==
The film was released worldwide on 7 June 2019. The film dubbed in Tamil and Telugu as Virus and Nipah Virus released on Zee5 and Aha respectively.

== Reception ==
=== Box office ===
The film grossed ₹3.9 crore in the opening weekend (7 – 9 June) from Kerala box office. It collected a worldwide total of over ₹15 crore in 12 days, with ₹11.74 crore from Kerala alone. By collecting $65,000 in 10 days from the United States, Virus became the fourth highest-grossing Malayalam film of 2019 in the US, behind Lucifer, Kumbalangi Nights, and Uyare. And as of 21 June, it is also the fourth highest-grossing Malayalam film of 2019 in the rest-of-India territories, behind Lucifer, Kumbalangi Nights, and Uyare. It earned ₹2,60,058 in Chennai from 18 shows in the opening weekend, and ₹4,82,715 in two weeks.

In the opening weekend, the film grossed $342,527 from the United Arab Emirates (UAE) and $9,098 from Australia. It grossed €2,749 (₹2.16 lakh) in Germany in two weeks. The film was released a week later (on 14 June) in the United Kingdom and New Zealand where it collected £14,991 (₹13.2 lakh) and NZ$12,409 (₹5.65 lakh) in the opening weekend, and £28,809 (₹25.56 lakh) and NZ$16,099 (₹7.4 lakh) in two weeks. In three weeks, it collected A$23,868 (₹11.56 lakh) in Australia and $587,960 in the UAE. In the US, it made $68,244 (47.13 lakh) in four weeks.

=== Critical reception ===
Sowmya Rajendran of The News Minute called the movie, "A compassionate, gripping medical thriller" and rated it 4/5 stars.

Meera Manu of News18 rated the movie 4/5 stars and said, "For its 152-minute duration, Virus will take you through many emotional roller-coasters. This one is contagious enough to make you skip a heartbeat or evoking tears. It's more than just a film, it's humans joining hands to beat a deadly disease. No reason to not watch this one." Manu of the Filmibeat rated the movie 4/5 stars and reviewed, "Virus is a mind-blowing movie and as its tagline says it rightly conveys the fear, fight and the survival during the Nipah outbreak. A well-crafted movie, which could be ranked as one among the best movies of all-time. Kudos to the team."

Anjana George of The Times of India rated the movie 3.5/5 stars and reviewed, "On the whole, the film can be called as a well-crafted multi-starrer, fictional documentation of news reports on the Nipah virus attack that shocked Kerala and still looms over us." Behindwoods rated the movie 3.25/5 stars and wrote, "With Virus, Aashiq Abu cements his top form as a filmmaker. Overall, Virus is a straightforward, detailed and uncompromising retelling of an unbelievable story of humanity."

== Accolades ==
Award	Category	Recipient	Notes
CPC Cine Awards	Best Director	Aashiq Abu	
CPC Cine Awards	Best Background Score	Sushin Shyam	
CPC Cine Awards	Best Editor	Saiju Sreedharan	
CPC Cine Awards	Best Production Designer	Jothish Shankar	
Vanitha Film Awards	Best Film on Social Issues		
Vanitha Film Awards	Best Supporting Actor	Soubin Shahir	
Vanitha Film Awards	Social Responsible Actor	Kunchacko Boban	
Vanitha Film Awards	Social Responsible Actress	Rima Kallingal	
Asianet Film Awards	Best Actress	Parvathy Thiruvothu	
