= Ambika Rao =

Indian actress

- Born: Ambika Rao; India
- Occupations: Actress, assistant director
- Years active: 2002–2021

Ambika Rao (1964 – 27 June 2022) was an Indian actress and assistant director, who worked in the Malayalam film industry. She has worked as assistant director in numerous Malayalam films. Ambika also acted in supporting roles in several movies and is popular for her role in Kumbalangi Nights as Babymol's mother.

== Career ==
Ambika entered into the Malayalam film industry in early 2000's as assistant director. She has assisted several directors including Shafi, Balachandra Menon, Anwar Rasheed and Vinayan.

Ambika has acted in supporting roles in numerous films including Meesha Madhavan, Anuraga Karikkinvellam, Kumbalangi Nights and Virus. She was noted for her role in Kumbalangi Nights as a widowed mother of two daughters.

== Death ==
Ambika died on 27 June 2022 after suffering cardiac arrest.

== Filmography ==
=== As actor ===
| Year | Title | Role | Notes |
|---|---|---|---|
| 2002 | Meesa Madhavan | Omana | |
| 2002 | Yathrakarude Sradhakku | Flat secretary | |
| 2003 | Gramophone | Cheriyamma | |
| 2003 | Pattalam | Muslim lady | |
| 2003 | Ente Veedu Appuvinteyum | Class teacher | |
| 2003 | Chronic Bachelor | Sreekumar's sister | |
| 2003 | Anyar | Raziya's mother | |
| 2003 | Gowrisankaram | Sankar's relative | |
| 2003 | Swapnakkoodu | Tamil lady | |
| 2004 | Vettam | | |
| 2004 | Rasikan | Professor | |
| 2004 | Njan Salperu Ramankutty | | |
| 2005 | Achuvinte Amma | Vanaja's neighbour | |
| 2005 | Krithyam | | |
| 2005 | Kochirajavu | | |
| 2006 | Rajamanikyam | | |
| 2006 | Classmates | Hostel warden sister | |
| 2006 | Kissaan | | |
| 2006 | Bhargavacharitham Moonnam Khandam | | |
| 2008 | Parunthu | Nurse | |
| 2009 | Seetha Kalyanam | Seetha's relative | |
| 2010 | In Ghost House Inn | Servant | |
| 2011 | Salt N' Pepper | Kalidas's colleague | |
| 2011 | Tournament | Nurse | |
| 2012 | Theevram | | |
| 2013 | Buddy | | |
| 2015 | Chandrettan Evideya | Chandramohan's Colleague | |
| 2015 | Lord Livingstone 7000 Kandi | Guguthai | |
| 2016 | Anuraga Karikkin Vellam | Interview Board Member | |
| 2019 | Thamaasha | Doctor | |
| 2019 | Virus | Head nurse | |
| 2019 | Safe | Sharadhamma | |
| 2019 | Kumbalangi Nights | Baby and Simmy's Mother | |
| 2019 | Little Riddles Oru Nurungu Samshayam | | Malayalam short film |
| 2020 | Paapam Cheyyathavar Kalleriyatte | Philomina | |
| 2020 | Ghar Se | | Hindi short film |
| 2021 | Vellam | | |

=== As assistant director ===
| Year | Title | Director | Notes |
|---|---|---|---|
| 2002 | Krishna Gopalakrishna | Balachandra Menon | |
| 2004 | Vellinakshatram | Vinayan | |
| 2005 | Rajamanikyam | Anwar Rasheed | |
| 2005 | Thommanum Makkalum | Shafi | |
| 2007 | Hallo | Rafi–Mecartin | |
| 2007 | Big B | Amal Neerad | |
| 2007 | Romeo | Rajasenan | |
| 2008 | Positive | V. K. Prakash | |
| 2008 | Parunthu | M. Padmakumar | |
| 2008 | Mayabazar | Thomas Sebastian | |
| 2008 | College Kumaran | Thulasidas | |
| 2009 | 2 Harihar Nagar | Lal | |
| 2009 | Love in Singapore | Rafi–Mecartin | |
| 2009 | Daddy Cool | Aashiq Abu | |
| 2010 | Tournament | Lal | |
| 2010 | Best Actor | Martin Prakkat | |
