= Malik (soundtrack) =

2021 soundtrack album by Sushin Shyam

Soundtrack album by Sushin Shyam
- Released: 16 July 2021
- Recorded: 2019–2021
- Genre: Feature film soundtrack
- Length: 19:28
- Language: Malayalam
- Label: Anto Joseph Film Company
- Producer: Sushin Shyam

Sushin Shyam chronology
Kappela (2020)	Malik (2021)	Kurup (2021)

Malik is the soundtrack album to the 2021 film of the same name directed by Mahesh Narayanan and produced by Anto Joseph Film Company along with Carnival Movie Network starring Fahadh Faasil. The soundtrack is composed by Sushin Shyam and lyrics written by Anwar Ali and Sameer Binsi. It was released on 16 July 2021, through the production house itself. The music and sound design was acclaimed by critics, and Vishnu Govind won the National Film Award for Best Audiography, whereas K. S. Chithra won the Filmfare Award for Best Female Playback Singer – Malayalam for the song "Theerame".

== Development ==
Malik is Shyam's maiden collaboration with Narayanan, who added "When I met him after Fahadh told me the story, I immediately forged a connection with him. I was taken by the way he narrated". According to Shyam, composing for the film was also telling the story through the music, where he had worked on the score in the order of the scenes, that resulted in the music going with the flow. Narayanan suggested Shyam to refrain the use of electronic music and wanted it to sync with the people and its place. However, due to the COVID-19 pandemic lockdown in India that enforced travel restrictions, Shyam decided to travel to Munnar for the music session. He finalized the theme after multiple attempts, and afterwards, Shyam composed the rest of the score. Shyam had worked on the film's music for more than a year due to the COVID-19 lockdown.

The first song "Theerame" is a duet recorded by K. S. Chithra and Sooraj Santhosh, becoming Shyam's maiden association with Chithra. Describing the song, Shyam added "It isn’t the typical fairytale track because of the incidents that precede the wedding of Ali-Rosaline (Nimisha Sajayan). A reference point for the beginning of the song was the clipping of a wedding song from the islands." Shyam was confident on Chitra being involved, as "she would be able to nail the pitch more than anyone else" and had understood the lyrical context (written by Anwar Ali) during its recording. The second song "Aararum Kanathe" was recorded by Shahabaz Aman. The third song "Raheemun Aleemun" is a melody that was added in the last minute and was played in the background score. The Sufi musician duo Sameer Binsi and Imam Majboor worked on the track, with the former writing the Arabic lyrics and the 10-year-old Hida Chokkad served as the lead singer, with additional vocals by Imam, Sinan Edakkara and Mithulesh. Shyam wanted the voice of a kid to lead the song, due to its spiritual feel.

While most of the post-production works had been completed prior to the COVID-19 pandemic lockdown, including the sound design, recording, reproduction and mixing, the film moved from a planned theatrical release to direct-to-digital release due to the uncertainty prevailing over theatrical releases. This led the sound design to be changed from theatre mix to stereo; sound designer Vishnu Govind felt emotional on the decision to shift from theatrical to digital release, where the tracks had been prepared by recording the faintest of sounds. Shyam further opined that "As for the background score, since the soundscape was meant for the theatre, you would not get the same effect when you watch the film on a laptop or television or any gadget. For example, some base notes weren’t even heard at all." This prompted him to learn sound mixing and other technologies to produce better output for other mediums.

== Release ==
"Theerame" was the first song to be released, with its accompanying music video on 13 July 2021. The soundtrack with the remaining four songs was released on 16 July, a day after the film's release.

== Reception ==
S. R. Praveen of The Hindu added that Shyam's music "[takes] it up a few notches". Rohan Naahar of Hindustan Times called it as a "lush score [that] shifts tones and genres in tandem with the film". Vishal Menon of Film Companion South described the music as "spectacular" and the song "Theerame" as one of the year's best songs. Sowmya Rajendran of The News Minute added that "a superior sound system that would have made Sushin Shyam’s background score even more effective in the ‘mass’ Suleiman moments." Anna M. M. Vetticad of Firstpost and Suresh Mathew of The Quint described the score as "haunting" and "foreboding".

== Track listing ==
Malik (Original Motion Picture Soundtrack)
No.	Title	Lyrics	Singer(s)	Length
1.	"Theerame"	Anwar Ali	K. S. Chithra, Sooraj Santhosh	4:23
2.	"Aararum Kanathe"	Anwar Ali	Shahabaz Aman	4:17
3.	"Raheemun Aleemun"	Sameer Binsi	Hida Chokkad, Imam Majboor, Mithulesh, Sinan Edakkara	2:08
4.	"Theerame" (Instrumental)	—	—	4:22
5.	"Aararum Kanathe" (Instrumental)	—	—	4:17
Total length:				19:28

== Background score ==
Malik

Film score by Sushin Shyam
- Released: 17 September 2021
- Recorded: 2019–2021
- Genre: Film score
- Length: 1:01:00
- Label: Anto Joseph Film Company
- Producer: Sushin Shyam

An album containing the background score for the film was released separately by Anto Joseph Film Company on 17 September 2021. It contains instrumental pieces by Sushin Shyam.

Malik (Original Background Score)
No.	Title	Length
1.	"Redemption"	6:39
2.	"Airport"	2:36
3.	"Ali's Umma"	3:58
4.	"Sulaiman Reborn"	2:38
5.	"Ramadapally"	1:07
6.	"Rise"	1:43
7.	"Chase"	2:12
8.	"Cashing In"	1:30
9.	"An Honourable Gesture"	2:08
10.	"Roselyn"	2:37
11.	"Blood Bath"	5:15
12.	"Malik"	3:48
13.	"Umma's Statement"	2:13
14.	"Submarine"	1:41
15.	"Aboobacker Theme"	1:10
16.	"Ali's Rationale"	2:20
17.	"Dua"	2:26
18.	"Blood Bath 2"	1:55
19.	"Loss of a Child"	4:05
20.	"Grieving"	4:02
21.	"Sulaiman's Demise"	4:42
Total length:		1:01:00

== Accolades ==
Award (Note: Awards, festivals and organizations are in alphabetical order.)	Date of ceremony (Note: Date is linked to the article about the awards held that year, wherever possible.)	Category	Recipient(s)	Result	Ref.
Filmfare Awards South	9 October 2022	Best Female Playback Singer – Malayalam	K. S. Chithra – ("Theerame")	Won	
Kerala State Film Awards	27 May 2022	Best Lyricist	Anwar Ali – ("Theerame")	Won	
National Film Awards	22 July 2022	Best Audiography (Re-recordist of the Final Mixed Track)	Vishnu Govind	Won	
South Indian International Movie Awards	10–11 September 2022	Best Female Playback Singer – Malayalam	K. S. Chithra – ("Theerame")	Nominated	
