= Rosapoo =

2018 film by Vinu Joseph

- Theatrical release poster
- Directed by: Vinu Joseph
- Written by: Vinu Joseph
- Produced by: Shibu Thameens
- Starring: Biju Menon; Neeraj Madhav; Soubin Shahir; Anjali
- Cinematography: Jebin Jacob
- Edited by: Vivek Harshan
- Music by: Sushin Shyam
- Production company: Thameens Films
- Release date: February 2018
- Running time: 140 minutes
- Country: India
- Language: Malayalam

Rosapoo (transl. Rose Flower) is a 2018 Malayalam-language comedy-drama film writte and directed by Vinu Joseph. The film produced by Shibu Thameens stars Biju Menon and Neeraj Madhav in the lead roles along with Soubin Shahir, Anjali, Alencier Ley Lopez, and Vijayaraghavan. The music is composed by Sushin Shyam. It portrays the porn movie market that boomed in the 2000–2010 decade.

== Plot ==
The story is centred around a small village in Kochi. Shajahan is a businessman suffering a loss in his brick-and-mortar business and tries his hand into many small businesses with his friend, Ambrose, to earn some money. The idea of businesses from incense sticks to egg and them to porn movies is the idea of their friend, Bhanu. Shahjahan had been taking money for all the businesses from money lender, Velayudhan. In order to solve the previous dues, he takes more money from him in the name of a movie. They find an actress and a writer with the help of Sajeer. The movie actress falls in love with Ambrose in between the shoot. Later, Shajahan and Ambrose get cheated by Sajeer as he conspires with the theatre owners to get the whole profit. Shajahan and Ambrose learn of the cheating only after the film becomes a hit.

== Cast ==
- Biju Menon as Shajahan
- Neeraj Madhav as Ambrose
- Anjali as Reshmi
- Alencier Ley Lopez as Venugopal Menon
- Sudheer Karamana as Kareem
- Basil Joseph as Bhanu
- Soubin Shahir as Sajeer
- Salim Kumar as V.T. Shankar
- Anagha as Actress
- Shilpa Manjunath as Sandra
- Madan Mohan as Roshan
- R.J. Murugan as Kunjumon
- Dinesh Nair as Varkey
- Suresh Nair as Velu
- Nirmal Palazhi as A.N. Narayana Potti aka Pavizham Narayanan
- Dileesh Pothan as Kuttan
- Bobby Simha as Actor (cameo)
- Vijayaraghavan as Velayudhan

== Soundtrack ==
The original soundtrack is composed, programmed, and arranged by Sushin Shyam.

Rosapoo

Soundtrack album by Sushin Shyam
- Released: 25 January 2018
- Genre: Feature film soundtrack
- Length: 18:07
- Label: Sony Music India
- Producer: Sushin Shyam

Sushin Shyam chronology
Maradona (2018)	Rosapoo (2018)	Varathan (2018)
External audio
- Audio Jukebox on YouTube

List of songs
No.	Title	Lyrics	Singer(s)	Length
1.	"Kochiloru Kappaladuthe"	Santhosh Varma	Sushin Shyam, Munna	3:10
2.	"Padinjattodiyal Kadalu"	Santhosh Varma	Sushin Shyam, Maqbool Mansoor	3:58
3.	"Munniloru Swargam"	Santhosh Varma	Suchith Suresan, Sushin Shyam	4:01
4.	"Rosapoo Malatharam"	Santhosh Varma	Sushin Shyam	3:58
5.	"Mutta Paatu"	Vinayak Sasikumar	Jassie Gift, Anthony Daasan, Sushin Shyam	3:41
Total length:				18:07
