= Minnal Murali (soundtrack) =

Soundtrack album by Shaan Rahman and Sushin Shyam
- Released: 17 December 2021
- Recorded: 2020–2021
- Genre: Feature film soundtrack
- Length: 22:19
- Language: Malayalam
- Label: Muzik 247

Shaan Rahman chronology
Sara's (2021)	Minnal Murali (2021)	Kunjeldho (2021)

Sushin Shyam chronology
Kurup (2021)	Minnal Murali (2021)	Bheeshma Parvam (2022)

Minnal Murali is the soundtrack album to the 2021 film of the same name directed by Basil Joseph and starring Tovino Thomas and Guru Somasundaram. The soundtrack featured eight songs composed by Shaan Rahman and Sushin Shyam, with lyrics written by Manu Manjith. The soundtrack was released under the Muzik 247 label on 17 December 2021.

== Development ==
Originally Shaan Rahman was announced as the primary composer. Later, Sushin Shyam joined the film to compose the background score and contributed four tracks to the film's music, with Shaan also composing four songs each. Manu Manjith served as the primary lyricist for the film songs. Speaking on the lyric-writing process, Manjith added that the songs in Minnal Murali aid the film's narration. He wrote the lyrics for "Thee Minnal" in a cartoonish and slangy way to remind the millennials about the vernacular comics in childhood, while "Kugramame" helps in establishing Jaison's character.

== Release ==
The soundtrack was preceded with its first song "Thee Minnal" released with an accompanying lyrical video and as a digital single on 8 November 2021. The song was composed and performed by Sushin with rap portions by Marthayan. The second song "Uyire", a melodic number composed by Shaan with vocals by Mithun Jayaraj and Narayani Gopan was released on 24 November. "Kugramame" composed by Sushin and performed by Vipin Raveendran, was released as the third single on 3 December. The fourth song "Edukka Kaashayi" was released on 9 December, and followed by the fifth song on "Aaromal" 15 December. The soundtrack album was released by Muzik 247 on 17 December 2021.

== Reception ==
=== Critical ===
In the review for The Times of India, Deepa Soman stated that "the songs are also both groovy and melodious and placed well in the storyline". Devarsi Ghosh of Hindustan Times reviewed the songs as "fabulous", with the titular track in particular. Sajin Srijith of The New Indian Express stated the soundtrack as "instantly addictive" and "carries the goodness of western retro hits". S Kiran Kumar of Film Companion South, the film's music and background score "manage to elevate the film even higher." While complimenting the inclusion of its songs in the narrative, Kiran also mentioned that the score had influences of Ennio Morricone and R. D. Burman. Janani K. of India Today wrote "Background score by Sushin Shyam and the songs by him and Shaan Rahman are soothing to hear." Anna M. M. Vetticad of Firstpost complimented Shyam's background score as one of the year's best.

=== Commercial ===
Devarsi Ghosh, in his Scroll.in year-ender of Indian film music in 2021 listed Minnal Murali as one of the best soundtracks. He noted, "Minnal Murali’s eclectic soundtrack by Sushin Shyam and Shaan Rahman fit well with the kaleidoscopic tone of the Malayalam superhero movie." A spokesperson from the music streaming service JioSaavn mentioned Minnal Murali as one of the popular film albums in the service; it is also one of the popular music albums at Gaana.

== Track listing ==
All lyrics are written by Manu Manjith.

Malayalam
No.	Title	Music	Singer(s)	Length
1.	"Thee Minnal"	Sushin Shyam	Marthyan, Sushin Shyam	2:12
2.	"Uyire"	Shaan Rahman	Mithun Jayaraj, Narayani Gopan	5:27
3.	"Kugramame"	Sushin Shyam	Vipin Raveendran	1:38
4.	"Edukka Kaashayi"	Shaan Rahman	Swetha Ashok	3:36
5.	"Aaromal"	Shaan Rahman	Nithya Mammen, Sooraj Santhosh	4:04
6.	"Raavil"	Sushin Shyam	Pradeep Kumar	3:29
7.	"Niranju Thaarakangal"	Shaan Rahman	M. G. Sreekumar	1:49
8.	"Tribal Song"	Sushin Shyam	Lata Balan, Reshmi Unni	2:20
Total length:				24:39

All lyrics are written by Rajesh Malarvannan.

Tamil
No.	Title	Music	Singer(s)	Length
1.	"Thee Minnal"	Sushin Shyam	Santhosh Hariharan	2:12
2.	"Thaniye"	Shaan Rahman	Sreekanth Hariharan, Haripriya	5:23
3.	"Kugramame"	Sushin Shyam	Deepak Blue	1:37
4.	"Thurumbaai Maariya"	Shaan Rahman	Priya Himesh, Ragesh PG	3:34
5.	"Vidikaalai Vaanamaai"	Shaan Rahman	Rita Thyagarajan, Sarath Santosh	3:47
6.	"Kaalai"	Sushin Shyam	Sreekanth Hariharan	3:29
7.	"Joliththu Thaaragaigal"	Shaan Rahman	Deepak Blue	1:49
8.	"Tribal Song"	Sushin Shyam	Lata Balan, Reshmi Unni	2:20
Total length:				24:14

All lyrics are written by Bharthi Babu.

Telugu
No.	Title	Music	Singer(s)	Length
1.	"Meghaallo Merupulu"	Sushin Shyam	Hymath Mohammed	2:12
2.	"Velithe"	Shaan Rahman	M. M. Srilekha, Sri Krishna	5:23
3.	"Kugramame"	Sushin Shyam	Deepu	1:37
4.	"Aracheye O Aayudhamaithe"	Shaan Rahman	Geetha Madhuri	3:36
5.	"Andaala Jeevitham"	Shaan Rahman	Dhanunjay Seepana, Sahithi	3:47
6.	"Koneti"	Sushin Shyam	Parthu Nemani	3:29
7.	"Nelaala Ningi Nundi"	Shaan Rahman	Parthu Nemani	1:49
8.	"Tribal Song"	Sushin Shyam	Lata Balan, Reshmi Unni	2:20
Total length:				24:16

All lyrics are written by Hridaya Shiva.

Kannada
No.	Title	Music	Singer(s)	Length
1.	"Benki Jwaale"	Sushin Shyam	Chethan Naik	2:12
2.	"Usire"	Shaan Rahman	Anuradha Bhat, Vishak	5:23
3.	"Kugramame"	Sushin Shyam	Chethan Naik	1:37
4.	"Ukkina Kaigala"	Shaan Rahman	Shamitha Malnad	3:36
5.	"Amabarada Taareye"	Shaan Rahman	Shamitha Malnad, Shashank Sheshagiri	3:47
6.	"Irulu"	Sushin Shyam	Vishak	3:29
7.	"Nelaala Ningi Nundi"	Shaan Rahman	Shashank Sheshagiri	1:49
8.	"Tribal Song"	Sushin Shyam	Lata Balan, Reshmi Unni	2:20
Total length:				24:16

All lyrics are written by Vimal Kashyap.

Hindi
No.	Title	Music	Singer(s)	Length
1.	"Fire Bijili"	Sushin Shyam	Nihar Shembekar	2:12
2.	"Khoya Re"	Shaan Rahman	Aanandi Joshi, Sameer Vijaykumar	5:23
3.	"Jo Khwaab Mein"	Sushin Shyam	Rajiv Sunderesan	1:37
4.	"Mumkin Kare Har Mushkil"	Shaan Rahman	Zeenia Roy	3:34
5.	"Hai Raushan Aasamaan"	Shaan Rahman	Nihar Shembekar, Isheeka	3:47
6.	"Jaaye"	Sushin Shyam	Sameer Vijaykumar	3:29
7.	"Woh Aasamaan"	Shaan Rahman	Sameer Vijaykumar	1:49
8.	"Tribal Song"	Sushin Shyam	Lata Balan, Reshmi Unni	2:20
Total length:				24:14

== Awards and nominations ==
Award (Note: Awards, festivals and organizations are in alphabetical order.)	Date of ceremony (Note: Date is linked to the article about the awards held that year, wherever possible.)	Category	Recipient(s)	Result	Ref.
Kerala State Film Awards	27 May 2022	Best Male Playback Singer	Pradeep Kumar – ("Raavil")	Won	
Kerala State Film Awards	27 May 2022	Best Sound Mixing	Justin Jose	Won	
South Indian International Movie Awards	10–11 September 2022	Best Male Playback Singer – Malayalam	Mithun Jayaraj – ("Uyire")	Won	
South Indian International Movie Awards	10–11 September 2022	Best Lyricist – Malayalam	Manu Manjith – ("Uyire")	Nominated	
