= How Are You? We Are Fine, Thank You =

Studio album by The Down Troddence
- Released: January 1, 2014
- Length: 38:35
- Label: Self-released

The Down Troddence chronology
How Are You? We Are Fine, Thank You (2014)	As You All Know, This Is How It Is (AYAKTIHIS) (TBA)

How Are You? We Are Fine, Thank You is the debut studio album by the Indian heavy metal band The Down Troddence. The album was released on January 1, 2014.

== Singles ==
In 2009, The Down Troddence released their first single, "Death Vanity". The band gained significant attention with the release of the music video for their single "Shiva," which won the Best Music Video award at the IndieGo South Asian Music Awards in 2011.The band gained significant attention with the release of the music video for their single "Shiva," which won the Best Music Video award at the IndieGo South Asian Music Awards in 2011. Both "Death Vanity" and "Shiva" would later be included in How Are You? We Are Fine, Thank You.

== Reception ==
How Are You? We Are Fine, Thank You received critical acclaim for its innovative fusion of genres and poignant lyrical content. It won eight awards at the Rolling Stone India Metal Awards 2014, including Best Album, Best Song, Best Band, Best Guitarist, and Best Artwork. Reviewers praised the album's production quality and its ability to balance aggressive metal riffs with subtle folk-based elements.

== Track listing ==
No.	Title	Length
1.	"A.V."	2:36
2.	"Hell Within Hell"	3:52
3.	"KFC"	4:05
4.	"Death Vanity"	3:14
5.	"Nagavalli"	4:35
6.	"Forgotten Martyrs"	3:32
7.	"Muck Fun Mohan"	3:52
8.	"Ortniavis"	3:17
9.	"Shiva"	4:36
10.	"Chaapilla"	4:56
Total length:		38:35

== Personnel ==
- Munz – vocals
- Varun Raj – guitar
- Sushin Shyam – keyboards, backing vocals
- Nezer Ahemed – bass, backing vocals
- Ganesh Radhakrishnan – drums
- Advaith Mohan – guitar
