= Jimshi Khalid =

Indian cinematographer

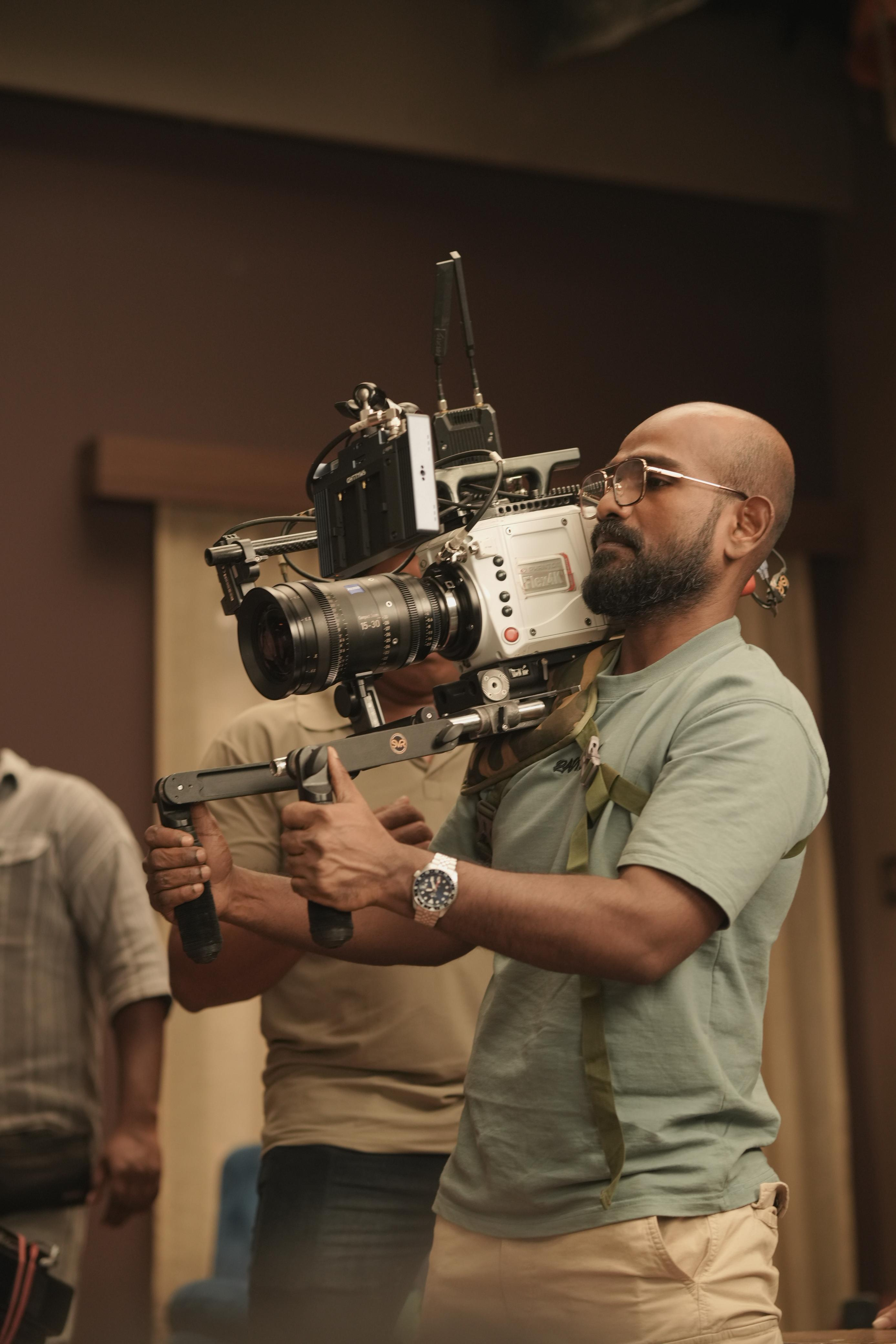
- Citizenship: Indian
- Occupation: Cinematographer
- Years active: 2016—present
- Relatives: Shyju Khalid (brother); Khalid Rahman (brother); V. P. Khalid (father)

Jimshi Khalid is an Indian cinematographer who predominantly works in the Malayalam Film Industry. He made his debut through Anuraga Karikkin Vellam (2016).

== Family ==
Noted director-cinematographer, Shyju Khalid, and film director and actor Khalid Rahman are his brothers. Jimshi Khalid has acknowledged the influence his brother Shyju has had on his career.

Film actor and theatre artist V. P. Khalid, is his father.

== Career ==
Jimshi Khalid and his brother come from a family of outsiders and they had to struggle to get established. He debuted as an assistant cameraman and became an independent cameraman through the movie Anuraga Karikkin Vellam directed by Khalid Rahman. The brothers do have creative differences as well.

Shayju's career choices, work ethic, and were inspirational for Jimshi.

== Filmography ==
Year	Title	Notes	Ref.
2016	Anuraga Karikkin Vellam	Debut	
2019	Allu Ramendran		
2020	Kappela		
2020	Love		
2022	Oruthee		
2022	Aviyal		
2022	Thallumaala		
2024	Thundu	Also producer	
2024	Por; Dange	Along with Presley Oscar D'Souza	
2024	Adios Amigo		
2025	Alappuzha Gymkhana		
2026	I'm Game		
