= Bheeshma Parvam (soundtrack) =

2022 soundtrack album by Sushin Shyam

Soundtrack album by Sushin Shyam
- Released: 7 March 2022
- Recorded: 2021–2022
- Genre: Feature film soundtrack
- Length: 16:19
- Language: Malayalam
- Label: 123 Musix
- Producer: Sushin Shyam

Sushin Shyam chronology
| Minnal Murali (2021) | Bheeshma Parvam (2022) | Ariyippu (2022) |
External audio
- Audio Jukebox on YouTube
- Original Motion Picture Soundtrack, from Spotify

Bheeshma Parvam is the soundtrack album for the 2022 Indian film of the same name. The soundtrack album was composed, produced and arranged by Sushin Shyam, distributed by 123 Musix and released on 7 March 2022. The album received positive feedback from music listeners and critics.

== Production ==
In an interview, Sushin Shyam revealed that making process of the soundtrack was a process that kept on evolving throughout the production, explaining: "When I did the teaser of Bheeshma Parvam, I had this idea, which wasn't connected to the film at all. But after that, we thought of including that too in the film. So, basically it's a process that keeps evolving, when you create a new tune, you think why not include it too. When I composed the track Parudeesa, it sort of gave me an idea about the music of the entire film." According to the music director:

"When you work with Amal Neerad, he already has his own expectations of what he wants and so I have to deliver that. Sound-wise, he always wants something new. In my initial days, I used to follow what others would want from me, but now I have started to include my additions too. I had an idea about the film, so I wanted to come up with something that mixes both classical and electronic music. That's the kind of genre I have tried to experiment with, for the songs as well as the score."

In addition to his acting role as Ami, Sreenath Bhasi sang the track "Parudeesa". The song "Rathi Pushpam" sung by Unni Menon was composed in 80's Synth-pop style. "we have tried to create songs of that time period. You can't call it a spoof but you know the song structure of the 80's. For instance, I have tried to compose a song, keeping in mind how my father would tune the track. But I haven't just tried to recreate the songs of that time period, I have also mixed it with the contemporary genre," said Sushin Shyam.

K. D. Vincent acted as the music coordinator of the project. Songs and score were mixed and mastered by Abin Paul.

== Music video ==
The video of the first song "Parudeesa" (featuring Sreenath Bhasi and Soubin Shahir) was released on 19 February 2022, and turned out to be an instant hit on YouTube. The video was praised for its choreography, picturisation and actors' performance. The song video of "Rathi pushpam" was released on 13 March 2022, set in the retro style of the 80's and featured Shine Tom Chacko and Ramzan Muhammed. The video garnered attention for its choreography and thematic portrayal of homosexuality. The video song of "Aakasham Pole" was released on 27 March.

== Reception ==
The soundtrack album received positive reviews from critics. Sajin Shrijith of The New Indian Express stated that "Sushin Shyam's instantly immersive music alternates between various genres, from classical to contemporary and, at one point, evokes one of the spaghetti-western scores of Ennio Morricone". The critic Veeyen wrote, "Sushin Shyam's arresting musical score leaves an extensive impression, and the upbeat track Parudeesa stands out from among the lot". "Rathi pushpam" was appreciated as a tribute to the 80's music. A reviewer of Milliblog Music Weekly wrote: "In line with the rest of the songs from the film, Sushin stays with this 80's synth sound, and in Unni Menon's voice, this is a pleasant trip back to the disco days!" The track "Aakasham Pole" was praised for its catchy lyrics, soulful music and rendition by Hamsika Iyer and Kapil Kapilan.

== Track listing ==
The lyrics were penned by Rafeeq Ahamed and Vinayak Sasikumar.

Bheeshma Parvam (Original Motion Picture Soundtrack)
| No. | Title | Lyrics | Artist(s) | Length |
|---|---|---|---|---|
| 1. | "Be Notorious" | Rumi's Quote | Sushin Shyam, Hamsika Iyer, Yogi B | 2:51 |
| 2. | "Parudeesa" | Vinayak Sasikumar | Sreenath Bhasi | 4:03 |
| 3. | "Rathipushpam" | Vinayak Sasikumar | Unni Menon | 2:40 |
| 4. | "Aakasham Pole" | Rafeeq Ahamed | Hamsika Iyer, Kapil Kapilan | 3:28 |
| 5. | "Bheeshma Parvam (Teaser Theme)" | | Sushin Shyam, Christo Xavier | 1:16 |
| 6. | "Bheeshma Parvam (Trailer Theme)" | | Sushin Shyam | 1:54 |
| Total length: | | | | 16:19 |

== Background score ==
An original soundtrack album was released separately by Amal Neerad Productions on 14 April 2022.

Bheeshma Parvam

Film score by Sushin Shyam
- Released: 14 April 2022
- Recorded: 2021-2022
- Genre: Film Score
- Length: 1:21:24
- Language: Malayalam
- Label: Amal Neerad Productions
- Producers: Sushin Shyam, Christo Xavier, Saeed Abbas
External audio
- Original Soundtrack on YouTube
- Original Motion Picture Soundtrack, from Spotify

Bheeshma Parvam (Original Background Score)
| No. | Title | Length |
|---|---|---|
| 1. | "Opening" | 03:23 |
| 2. | "Peter's Theme" | 02:39 |
| 3. | "Martin's Intro" | 00:58 |
| 4. | "Story Of Prince And Elsa + Michael's Intro" | 03:20 |
| 5. | "Michael's Intro" | 00:38 |
| 6. | "Swami Sharanam" | 01:42 |
| 7. | "Family Meeting" | 04:22 |
| 8. | "Mathan's Issue" | 02:21 |
| 9. | "Susan's Theme" | 00:41 |
| 10. | "Michael In Action" | 02:25 |
| 11. | "Molly And Alice" | 00:40 |
| 12. | "Story Of Michael" | 02:12 |
| 13. | "James' Entry" | 03:44 |
| 14. | "Rajan" | 04:13 |
| 15. | "Rajan Meets Michael" | 05:31 |
| 16. | "Ami And Rachel" | 05:31 |
| 17. | "Peter Up For Something" | 02:06 |
| 18. | "Ami's Swan Song" | 05:14 |
| 19. | "Ajas' Fury" | 02:56 |
| 20. | "Michael's Revelation" | 02:17 |
| 21. | "Michael Attacked" | 05:22 |
| 22. | "ICU/Bed Of Arrows" | 02:12 |
| 23. | "Revenge" | 10:05 |
| 24. | "End Game" | 03:25 |
| 25. | "The End" | 02:01 |
| Total length: | | 01:21:24 |
