= V. P. Khalid =

Indian Malayalam actror

- Born: 1951; Kerala, India
- Died: 24 June 2022 (aged 70–71)
- Occupation: Actor
- Years active: 1967–2022
- Children: Khalid Rahman; Shyju Khalid; Jimshi Khalid

V. P. Khalid, also known as Cochin Nagesh (1951 – 24 June 2022) was an Indian Malayalam film actor and theatre artist. Khalid was a member of several professional drama troupes. In 1973, he made his movie debut through Periyar directed by P. J. Antony. He rose to fame among the television audience for his role as ‘Sumeshettan’ in Malayalam series Marimayam, aired in Mazhavil Manorama. He died on 25 June 2022 at a film location in Vaikom after suffering a cardiac arrest.

== Career ==
Khalid started his career as a drama artist at the age of 16. He came as a replacement in that play and won the best comedian award for his performance in the play. He was a member of several professional drama troupes such as Alleppey Theatres and Cochin Sanathana. Khalid had acted in plays like Dracula, Ancham Thirumurivu and Ezhunallathu. In 1973, he made his big screen debut. He is known for his roles in movies such as Kanal Kaattu, Sunday Holiday, Ponnapuram Kotta, Anuraga Karikkin Vellam, Vikruthi and Puzhu. He best known for his role as Sumesh in Marimayam, which is a sitcom telecasting in Mazhavil Manorama.
