= Thundu =

2024 Indian Malayalam comedy film

- Directed by: Riyas Shareef
- Written by: Kannappan; Riyas Shareef
- Produced by: Ashiq Usman; Jimshi Khalid
- Starring: Biju Menon; Shine Tom Chacko
- Cinematography: Jimshi Khalid
- Edited by: Nabu Usman
- Music by: Gopi Sundar
- Production company: Ashiq Usman Productions
- Release date: 16 February 2024
- Country: India
- Language: Malayalam

Thundu is a 2024 Indian Malayalam language comedy film directed by Riyas Shereef (in his directorial debut). featuring Biju Menon in lead role with Unnimaya Prasad and Shine Tom Chacko in the supporting roles. The film was released on 16 February 2024 to mixed reviews from critics.

== Plot ==
A constable aiming for a promotion unexpectedly encounters many problems. He tried to overcome them with humour and compassion.

== Cast ==
- Biju Menon as CPO Baby John T, later ASI
- Shine Tom Chacko asCPO Shibin Chandran
- Abhiram Radhakrishnan as Gireesh Partykkaran
- Gokulan as CPO Naveen
- Raffi as CPO Raghavan
- Baiju as Police Commissioner Sathyachandran IPS
- Kottayam Nazeer as SI Sabu Cheriyan
- Johny Antony as CI Ravichandran
- Unnimaya Prasad as Seena, Baby's wife
- Shaju Sreedhar as SI Madhusudhan Nair
- Vineeth Thattil David as CPO Kannan
- Sajin Cherukayil as CPO Johny Samson
- Zhinz Shan
- Sminu Sijo as Principal Dayana Jacob
- Althaf Salim as Dr. Vidyesh
- Ashlin Salim as Veterinary Nurse

== Reception ==
Anna Mathews of The Times of India rated 2 out of 5 stars and wrote "Thundu offers a bit of novelty in the cop story genre and has some humorous moments, but it lacks a compelling story". Anandu Suresh of The Indian Express rated with 1 out of 5 stars and wrote "Despite Riyas Shereef's story having a decent setup for a funny flick, Thundu totally misses the mark and doesn't use it to its full potential."
