= Madhu C. Narayanan =

Malayalam film director

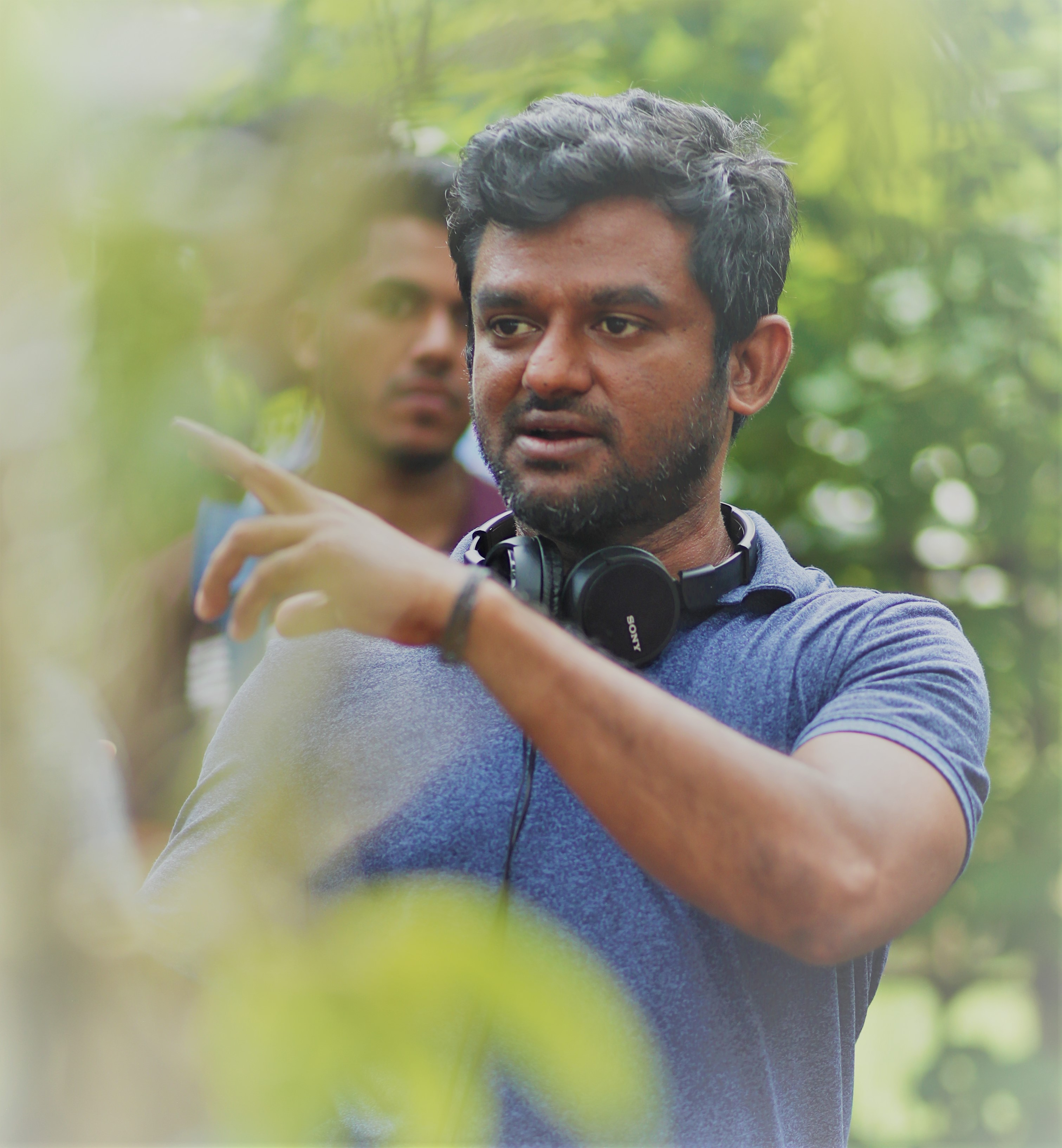
- Born: Shoranur, Kerala
- Occupation: Film director
- Years active: 2009 - present
- Known for: Kumbalangi Nights
- Awards: Aravindan Puraskaram

Madhu C. Narayanan is an Indian film director, who works predominantly in Malayalam movie industry. His directorial debut, Kumbalangi Nights, received critical acclaim for its realistic and poignant portrayal of a dysfunctional family.

== Early life ==
In the beginning, Madhu collaborated with several advertisement companies as an associate. Madhu made his entry in feature films through Aashiq Abu's Daddy Cool where he served as an assistant director. From Aashiq's third film 22 Female Kottayam onwards, Madhu frequently collaborated with him as an associate director. Madhu C. Narayanan's stints as associate director also includes Dileesh Pothan's Maheshinte Prathikaaram and Shyju Khalid's "Sethulakshmi" (Anthology segment; 5 Sundarikal). He also served as a creative contributor in Thondimuthalum Driksakshiyum

== Career ==
Madhu C. Narayanan's debut movie Kumbalangi Nights, came out in 2019. The movie received critical acclaim and was a commercial success as well. Later, Kumbalangi Nights achieved a widespread recognition as reviews for the movie appeared in global media like The Guardian.

== Filmography ==
=== As director ===
Year	Film	Notes
2019	Kumbalangi Nights	
2027	Naslen Film	

=== As associate director ===
Year	Film	Notes
2012	22 Female Kottayam	
2012	Da Thadiya	
2013	5 Sundarikal	Anthology film; Segments: Gauri directed by Aashiq Abu and Sethulakshmi directed by Shyju Khalid
2013	Idukki Gold	
2014	Gangster	
2015	Rani Padmini	
2016	Maheshinte Prathikaaram	

=== As assistant director ===
Year	Film	Notes
2009	Daddy Cool	
2011	Salt N' Pepper	

== Awards ==
Year	Film	Award	Category	Result
2019	Kumbalangi Nights	Kerala State Film Awards	Best Film	Won
2019	Kumbalangi Nights	Kerala State Film Award for Best Film with Popular Appeal and Aesthetic Value	Best Film	Won
2020	Kumbalangi Nights	Aravindan Puraskaram	Best Debutante Director	Won
2020	Kumbalangi Nights	Gollapudi Srinivas Award	Best Debutante Director	Won
2020	Kumbalangi Nights	Padmarajan Award	Best Director	Won
