= Poovaranthode =

Poovaranthode പൂവാറൻതോട്
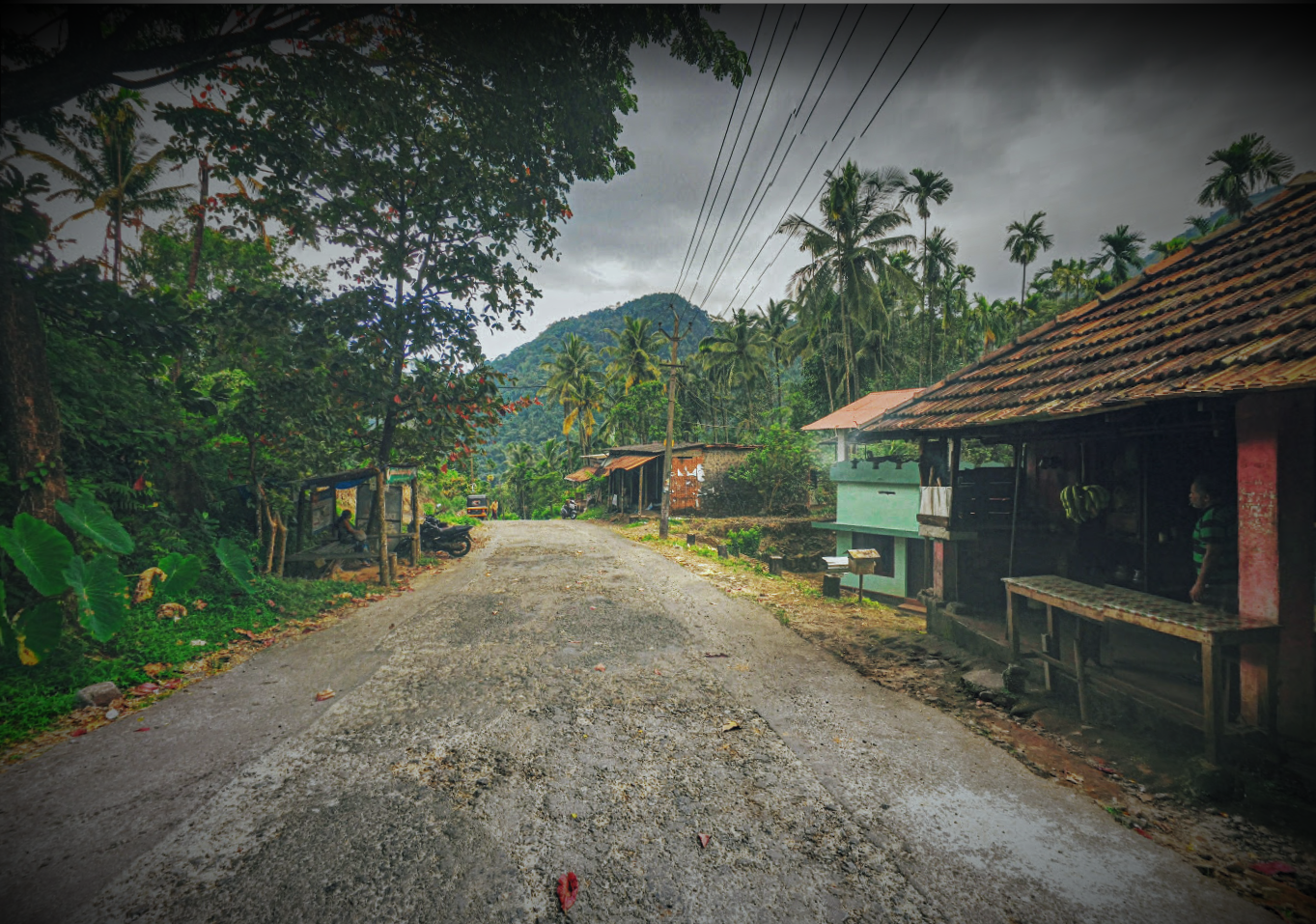
- Poovaranthode Village
- Interactive map of Poovaranthode
- Coordinates: 11°23′11″N 76°04′25″E
- Country: India
- State: Kerala
- District: Kozhikode
- Taluk: Thamarassery
- Panchayat: Koodaranhi

Government
  - MP: Priyanka Gandhi
  - MLA: C. K. Kasim
  - Panchayath Member: Roy Akkel

Languages
  - Official: Malayalam, English
- Time zone: UTC+5:30 (IST)
- PIN: 673604
- Area code: 0495
- Vehicle registration: KL 57

Poovaranthode is a small village located in Kozhikode District of Kerala, India. As a hilltop village, it is one of the coolest places in the Malabar region. The village has a generally humid tropical climate, with a very hot season extending from March to May. The average annual rainfall is more than 3500 mm, the highest in Kozhikode district. Hindus, Christians, and Muslims coexist in harmony. It is an agricultural area, and a large portion of the population are farmers. Nutmeg, cocoa, cashew, banana and coconut are the major crops. In recent years, pig farming and poultry farming have also become common. The village is often referred to as the Nutmeg Village of Kerala. There are around 20 resorts scattered across the vast green landscape, attracting visitors to its cool climate and natural beauty.

== History ==
Poovaranthode is an immigrant village. The ancestors were migrants from Travancore. Immigration was started from Kottayam, Pala and Thodupuzha. Malabar was under the Madras Presidency in independent India. Due to the large population of Central Travancore during the 20th century but the extent of the agricultural land remained unchanged, many migrated to Malabar as a result of cultivation. Most of the immigrants were Syrian Christians.

== Location ==
The village is situated at around 1,000 meters (3280.84 ft) above mean sea level in the Western Ghats mountain range. The place is about 48 km from Kozhikode city by road. The nearest airport is Calicut International Airport and the nearest railway station is Kozhikode railway station.

== Etymology ==
The village is known for its numerous streams. According to local tradition, the name Poovaranthode originated from a scene where flowers were seen floating in a stream beneath fallen trees. In the early days, tribal people are said to have gathered by the stream to rest and observed this sight. The name Poovaranthode is thus believed to mean "floating flowers in a stream."

== Landmarks ==
The village is home to several notable institutions and places of worship, including:

- GLP School – A government lower primary school serving the local community.
- St. Mary's Church – A prominent Roman Catholic place of worship.
- Juma Masjid – The main mosque in the village, serving the Muslim community.
- Sree Udayagiri Dharmasastha Temple – A Hindu temple dedicated to Lord Ayyappa.
- Samskarika Nilayam – A cultural center hosting local events and programs.
- Vayana Saala – A village library promoting reading and education.
- Anganwadi – A center focused on early childhood care and education.
- Vanasamrakshana Samadhi – A site symbolizing the village’s commitment to forest conservation.

== Demographics ==
Christians constitute a majority of the population, followed by Muslim and Hindu communities. Most of the inhabitants are descendants of migrants from the southern districts of Kerala, particularly from the Mid-Travancore region.

== Transportation ==
The village is well-connected by road to Kozhikode and nearby towns. The Kerala State Road Transport Corporation (KSRTC) operates regular bus services to and from the village. The nearest railway station is in Kozhikode, and the closest airport is Calicut International Airport. Local transportation includes KSRTC buses, jeeps, and private vehicles.
