= Anuraga Karikkin Vellam =

- Theatrical release poster
- Directed by: Khalid Rahman
- Written by: Naveen Bhaskar
- Produced by: Santhosh Sivan; Shaji Nadesan; Prithviraj Sukumaran; Arya
- Starring: Biju Menon; Asif Ali; Rajisha Vijayan; Asha Sarath
- Cinematography: Jimshi Khalid
- Edited by: Noufal Abdullah
- Music by: Prashant Pillai
- Production company: August Cinema
- Distributed by: August Cinema
- Release date: 7 July 2016 (India)
- Running time: 128 minutes
- Country: India
- Language: Malayalam
- Budget: ₹4.5 crore
- Box office: est. ₹22 crore

Anuraga Karikkin Vellam (English: The Tender Coconut Water of Love) is a 2016 Indian Malayalam romantic comedy film directed by Khalid Rahman (in his directorial debut). It stars Biju Menon, Asif Ali, Asha Sharath, and Rajisha Vijayan in lead roles. Written by Naveen Bhaskar, it revolves around the life of an ordinary policeman, Raghu, and his son, Abhilash. The soundtrack and background score for the film are composed by Prashant Pillai.

It was produced jointly by Shaji Nadesan, Prithviraj Sukumaran, Santhosh Sivan, and Arya under the banner of August Cinema. Anuraga Karikkin Vellam was released on 7 July 2016. Rajisha Vijayan's performance won her the Kerala State Film Award for Best Actress in 2016.

== Plot ==
Abhilash alias Abhi is a young architect in search of a job. His girlfriend, Elizabeth alias Eli, is a sweet, bubbly, and kind-hearted girl who treats Abhi like a kid. Abhi is irritated by Eli's frequent calls and interference in his life. Upon his friend's suggestions, he breaks up with Eli, leaving her heartbroken. She struggles with her breakup.

Abhi's father, ASI Raghu, is a strict police officer. One day, he meets his ex-girlfriend, Anuradha, and tries to contact her, but fails. Abhi gets to know this and gives a fake number to Raghu. Eli gives her own number to Raghu and pretends to be Anuradha. Raghu and Eli form a very friendly bond. She manages to make things better between Raghu and his wife, Suma. After years of marriage, Raghu and Suma get closer because of Eli. Abhi gets a job in a call centre where one of his old friends, Sony, also works. But Abhi finds it difficult to adjust in the call centre and leaves. Sony confesses to Abhi that he loves Eli. Sony helps Eli in coming out of the breakup and proposes to Eli. Abhi starts missing Eli, however, her marriage gets fixed with Sony. One last time, Eli meets Abhi and tells him how important he is to her and leaves. Abhi starts realising her worth and wants her back. Raghu wants to meet Anuradha and requests her to meet him. With no choice left, Eli meets Raghu and tells him the truth.

On the day before her wedding, Abhi decides to stop Eli's wedding and bring her back. However, he gets arrested and detained at a police station. The next morning, his father releases him. He confesses to his father that he loves Eli and she is headed towards marrying someone else. Raghu supports Abhi and rushes to stop the wedding, however, they fail to do so. Abhi apologizes to Eli and proposes to her. Eli, now married to Sony rejects Abhi and makes peace with him. Sony thanks Abhi. While returning, Raghu again meets Anuradha, and this time, they chase her car. Upon asking about her, she reveals that she is not Anuradha. After she leaves, Raghu and Abhi share a laugh, finally bonding.

Some time later, Abhi and Raghu are shown sitting near a new project designed and constructed by Abhi, reminiscing about their past love and how love, even though sometimes unsuccessful, can actually leave you with good life lessons.

== Cast ==
- Biju Menon as ASI Raghu P., a furious police officer, Suma's husband and Abhi's and Anu's father
- Asha Sarath as Suma, Raghu's wife and Abhi's and Anu's mother
- Asif Ali as Abhilash Raghu "Abhi", an architect and Raghu's son
- Rajisha Vijayan as Elizabeth "Eli" Kopara, Abhi's girlfriend and later Sony's wife
- Sreenath Bhasi as Kichu, Abhi's friend
- Soubin Shahir as Fakrudheen (Fakru), Abhi's friend, a bike mechanic
- Ivana as Anu, Raghu's and Suma's daughter and Abhi's younger sister
- Sudheer Karamana as James, Raghu's colleague police officer
- Pauly Valsan as Corporation Cleaner
- Naaji as Sony, Abhi's old friend and later Eli's husband.
- Chinnu Chandni as Jaslin
- Irshad as Irfan Khan
- Maniyanpilla Raju as Prakash Kopara, Eli's father
- Sudhi Koppa as Thanka
- Tom Alter as Abhi's boss
- V. P. Khalid as Band Mani
- Nandhini as Anuradha (cameo)
- Shaji Nadeshan as Anuradha's husband (cameo)

== Soundtrack ==
Anuraga Karikkin Vellam

Soundtrack album by Prashant Pillai
- Released: 17 June 2016
- Recorded: 2016
- Genre: Feature film soundtrack
- Length: 14:37
- Label: Anon Trendz

Prashant Pillai chronology
Rockstar (2015)	Anuraga Karikkin Vellam (2016)

The original soundtrack is composed, programmed, and arranged by Prashant Pillai. The soundtrack was made available for digital sale from 1 July 2016.

No.	Song	Singer(s)	Lyrics	Length
1	"Manogatham Bhavan"	Mathangi, Haricharan	Harinarayanan	4:25
2	"Neeyo Njano"	Vaikom Vijayalakshmi, Niranj, Shabareesh Varma, Sreerag Saji	Shabareesh Varma	4:01
3	"Poyimaranjo"	Preeti Pillai, Arun Kamath	Shabareesh Varma	2:24
4	"Anuraga Karikinvellam"	Govind Vasantha, Peethambaran Menon	Shabareesh Varma	3:53
5	"Manogatham Nadaswaram" (Instrumental)	—	—	

== Release ==
Anuraga Karikkin Vellam released in India on 7 July 2016 on the occasion of Eid, in 74 screens across Kerala along with Kasaba at the box office.

== Reception ==
=== Accolades ===
Year	Award	Category	Recipient
2016	Kerala State Film Award	Best Actress	Rajisha Vijayan
2016	Filmfare Award	Best Supporting Actress – Malayalam	Asha Sarath
2016	Asianet Film Award	Best Star Pair; Best Character Actor	Asif Ali & Rajisha Vijayan; Biju Menon

=== Critical response ===
International Business Times called it a "sweet family entertainer". The Times of India said, "On the whole, it's one of those cute family movies packed with a basket-full of laughter, emotions, and thoughts that you can give in to, without a second thought.

=== Box office ===
==== Domestic ====
Anuraga Karikkin Vellam grossed more than ₹16 crore from the multiplexes of Kochi in five days. Among the Eid releases, Anuraga Karikkin Vellam, emerged as the top grosser at the Kochi multiplexes.
