= Varathan =

- Theatrical release poster
- Directed by: Amal Neerad
- Written by: Suhas-Sharfu
- Based on: Straw Dogs
- Produced by: Nazriya Nazim; Amal Neerad
- Starring: Fahadh Faasil; Aishwarya Lekshmi
- Cinematography: Littil Swayamp
- Edited by: Vivek Harshan
- Music by: Sushin Shyam
- Production companies: Fahadh Faasil and Friends; Amal Neerad Productions
- Distributed by: A & A Release
- Release date: 20 September 2018 (India)
- Running time: 130 minutes
- Country: India
- Language: Malayalam
- Box office: est. ₹33 crores

Varathan (transl. Outsider) is a 2018 Indian Malayalam-language action thriller film written by Suhas-Sharfu and directed by Amal Neerad, who jointly produced the film with Nazriya Nazim under the banners of Fahadh Faasil and Friends and Amal Neerad Productions. It is an adaptation of the 1971 film Straw Dogs and stars Fahadh Faasil and Aishwarya Lekshmi in the lead roles.

Varathan was released on 20 September 2018 and became a blockbuster at the box office.

== Plot ==
Abi and Priya are a married couple who return to Kerala from Dubai for a break from their jobs. They decide to live at Priya's childhood home in the hills. From the first day, Priya is suspicious of the intentions of the contractors who work on her family's land. The villagers and neighbours are also shown ogling her. After their wedding anniversary, she spots someone staring at them from the window, but the shadow disappears when she wakes Abi. The next day, she is about to take a bath but spots a man staring at her through the window and screams.

Abi spots a worker in the upper grounds and shuts the window with duct tape and newspaper. Priya constantly warns Abi that people around are not the same as in Bangalore or Dubai and they ought to be more careful. One day, Abi has to meet a designer regarding their startup, and Priya is left alone at home. She promises to go to the convent after Abi leaves. She locks the house and goes to the convent library. She is hit by a jeep with ill-intentioned neighbours, Josey, Johnny, and their right-hand man Jithin, who molest her and while she lies unconscious, they leave her in the hospital.

After returning home at night, Abi sees the house locked and goes out to search for Priya. He is informed by the estate caretaker, Benny, that Priya has been hospitalized. Abi reaches the hospital, but Priya furiously leaves without saying anything. She walks into the house and starts packing her bags. When questioned by Abi, she reveals that she has been sexually molested. She no longer feels safe living with Abi in the hills or anywhere else. Abi walks out and meets a boy named Preman and his mother. He learns how Preman was caught with the contractor's daughter, Sandra, in the bushes that day.

Preman's mother explains that the contractor's family is now looking to kill him. Abi allows Preman and his mother to go inside his house and locks the door, but he tells the contractor's henchmen that he did not see Preman. Dissatisfied, the contractor's henchmen return with the contractor after noticing Preman's slippers on the verandah. Abi refuses to give up Preman and tells the men that they can find him tomorrow at the police station. None of the people withdraw, upon which Abi walks inside and tries to lock the door. When stopped by Josey and Johnny, Abi slides out a butcher's knife, stabs Johnny's left forearm, kicks Josey away, locks the door, and takes Priya, Preman, and his mother to a safe room.

Abi successfully sets up the house to electrocute the invaders. Some try to get inside the house, but he cleverly burns them with a torch flame using a LPG gas cylinder. After fighting tooth and nail until the morning, Abi is brutally hit on the head and captured by the contractor and Josey. While they aim to shoot him with a gun, Priya walks out with the mother and the son to surrender. When they look towards her, Priya shoots two of the perpetrators. Seeing the opportunity, Abi takes charge, and the contractor flees away. Abi hits Josey, who is the last of Priya's abusers, and informs him that the police will take them. After the chaos, Abi narrates to Josey how the law is still alive in this part of the country. Two weeks later, Abi locks the gate with a plaque saying Trespassers will be shot, where the end credits start to roll.

== Cast ==
- Fahadh Faasil as Abin Mathew
- Aishwarya Lekshmi as Priya Paul
- Sharafudheen as Josey
- Arjun Ashokan as Johnny
- Dileesh Pothan as Benny
- Nisthar Sait as Pappali Kurian
- Ramakrishnan Perumbavoor as Pappali Iype
- Shobi Thilakan as Baby
- Vijilesh Karayad as Jithin
- Thomman Mankuva as Peter
- Roshan Chandra as Kunjumon
- Chethan Jayalal as Preman
- Unnimaya Prasad as Preman's mother
- Mamitha Baiju as Sandra
- Jinu Joseph as George
- Kochu Preman as Oanth
- Parvathi T. as Lilly
- Bonny Mary Mathew as Maria
- Sundar Pandiyan as Sabu
- Kasi as Murugan

== Production ==
Besides directing, Amal Neerad co-produced the film with Nazriya Nazim which stars her husband, Fahadh Faasil, alongside Aishwarya Lekshmi. Neerad revealed the film's title on 20 June 2018 by releasing the first poster. Varathan in Malayalam means "outsider" in English. Writer Suhas describes the film as a "survival thriller". Shot in Dubai and Wagamon, filming was completed by June 2018.

== Soundtrack ==
Varathan

Soundtrack album by Sushin Shyam
- Released: September 12, 2018
- Genre: Feature film soundtrack
- Length: 40:09
- Label: Goodwill Entertainments
- Producer: Sushin Shyam

Sushin Shyam chronology
Maradona (2018)	Varathan (2018)	Lilli (2018)

The music was composed, programmed, and arranged by Sushin Shyam. The lyrics were penned by Vinayak Sasikumar.

track listings
No.	Title	Lyrics	Singer(s)	Length
1.	"Nee"	Vinayak Sasikumar	Sreenath Bhasi, Nazriya Nazim	03:22
2.	"Puthiyoru Pathayil"	Vinayak Sasikumar	Nazriya Nazim	03:05
3.	"Oduvile Theeyayi"	Vinayak Sasikumar	Sushin Shyam, Neha S. Nair	04:10
4.	"Title - Sit Back and Relax"			2:29
5.	"Abi's Office-Uncertainty"			1:45
6.	"Priya and Abin's Love Theme"			2:24
7.	"Looking Around the House /Exploring"			1:30
8.	"Creep Outside/Josie theme"			1:47
9.	"Prying Eyes"			1:23
10.	"Violated"			2:27
11.	"Red is On"			7:17
12.	"Night vision"			1:33
13.	"Assault"			1:25
14.	"The End"			5:32
Total length:				40:09

== Release ==
The film was released on 20 September 2018.

== Reception ==
Varathan received positive reviews from critics who remarked that the film is an unofficial adaptation of Straw Dogs. The performances of Fahad Faasil, Aishwarya Lekshmi and Sharafudheen received praise while climax and the action sequences received critical acclaim from the audience and the critics alike.

=== Critical response ===
Sanjith Sidhardhan of The Times of India gave 3.5/5 stars and wrote "Varathan takes its time to simmer in the first half, with its songs and varied characters, but in the second half it comes all guns blazing and turns into a stylish survival thriller worth watching."

Sajin Shrijith of Cinema Express wrote "Amal Neerad transplants the story of Sam Peckinpah's Straw Dogs (1971) to Kerala with most of the brutality removed but none of the tension. This is one blistering and immensely satisfying revenge thriller."

Sowmya Rajendran of The News Minute wrote that the first half sets up the creeps admirably, while the second half feels like a squandered opportunity.

Behindwoods gave 3.25/5 stars and wrote "Varathan is an experience that very few Malayalam films can provide. High-quality making, perfect acting, well-worked screenplay, brilliant background score are not something you see every Friday.".

=== Box office ===
On 5 October 2018, the film grossed ₹22 crore worldwide, with ₹18 crore from Kerala alone. It grossed ₹1.06 crore from Bangalore in 12 days and became the highest-grossing Malayalam film of that year in Bangalore. Varathan grossed ₹33 crore worldwide at the end of its theatrical run and became a commercial success.

== Accolades ==
Award (Note: Awards, festivals and organizations are in alphabetical order.)	Date of ceremony (Note: Date is linked to the article about the awards held that year, wherever possible.)	Category	Recipient(s)	Result	Ref.
Asianet Film Awards	6–7 April 2019	Best Director	Amal Neerad	Nominated	
Asianet Film Awards	6–7 April 2019	Best Actor	Fahadh Faasil	Nominated	
Asianet Film Awards	6–7 April 2019	Most Popular Actor	Fahadh Faasil	Nominated	
Asianet Film Awards	6–7 April 2019	Best Actress	Aishwarya Lekshmi	Nominated	
Asianet Film Awards	6–7 April 2019	Most Popular Actress	Aishwarya Lekshmi	Won	
Asianet Film Awards	6–7 April 2019	Best Actor in a Negative role	Sharaf U Dheen	Nominated	
Asianet Film Awards	6–7 April 2019	Best Editor	Vivek Harshan	Won	
Asiavision Awards	16 February 2019	Star of the Year	Aishwarya Lekshmi	Won	
CPC Cine Awards	17 February 2019	Best Actress	Aishwarya Lekshmi	Won	
Filmfare Awards South	21 December 2019	Best Actress – Malayalam	Aishwarya Lekshmi	Nominated	
Filmfare Awards South	21 December 2019	Best Supporting Actor – Malayalam	Sharaf U Dheen	Nominated	
Filmfare Awards South	21 December 2019	Best Music Director – Malayalam	Sushin Shyam	Nominated	
South Indian International Movie Awards	15–16 August 2019	Best Film – Malayalam	Fahadh Faasil and Friends; Amal Neerad Productions	Nominated	
South Indian International Movie Awards	15–16 August 2019	Best Director – Malayalam	Amal Neerad	Nominated	
South Indian International Movie Awards	15–16 August 2019	Best Cinematographer – Malayalam	Littil Swayamp	Nominated	
South Indian International Movie Awards	15–16 August 2019	Best Actress – Malayalam	Aishwarya Lekshmi	Won	
South Indian International Movie Awards	15–16 August 2019	Best Actor in a Negative Role – Malayalam	Sharaf U Dheen	Won	
South Indian International Movie Awards	15–16 August 2019	Best Music Director – Malayalam	Sushin Shyam	Won	
Vanitha Film Awards	2 March 2019	Best Actress	Aishwarya Lekshmi	Won	
