= Kumbalangi Nights =

2019 film by Madhu C. Narayanan

- Theatrical release poster
- Directed by: Madhu C. Narayanan
- Written by: Syam Pushkaran
- Produced by: Fahadh Faasil; Nazriya Nazim; Dileesh Pothan
- Starring: Shane Nigam; Fahadh Faasil; Soubin Shahir; Sreenath Bhasi; Mathew Thomas; Anna Ben
- Cinematography: Shyju Khalid
- Edited by: Saiju Sreedharan
- Music by: Sushin Shyam
- Production companies: Fahadh Faasil and Friends; Working Class Hero
- Distributed by: Century Films
- Release date: 7 February 2019
- Running time: 134 minutes
- Country: India
- Language: Malayalam
- Budget: ₹6.5 crore
- Box office: ₹39 crore

Kumbalangi Nights is a 2019 Indian Malayalam-language romantic comedy drama film directed by Madhu C. Narayanan in his directorial debut. It was written by Syam Pushkaran and jointly produced by Fahadh Faasil and Nazriya Nazim under their production house Fahadh Faasil and Friends, in association with Dileesh Pothan and Syam Pushkaran under Working Class Hero banner. The film stars Shane Nigam, Fahadh Faasil, Soubin Shahir, and Sreenath Bhasi, along with debutants Anna Ben, Grace Antony and Mathew Thomas in pivotal roles. The cinematography and editing were handled by Shyju Khalid and Saiju Sreedharan, respectively. The soundtrack and background score was composed by Sushin Shyam.

Set in the eponymous fishing village of Kumbalangi in Kochi, Kerala, the film centres on the strained relationship among four brothers living together in a dysfunctional home, and how they ultimately stand up for each other as a family. Syam came up with the idea for the film based on the time he spent in the village in his twenties. In 2011, he discussed the story with then-assistant director Madhu, who decided to make his directorial debut with it. By 2016, Fahadh and Pothan, both of whom had worked closely with Madhu and Syam on previous films, had agreed to co-produce the film. Madhu then spent a year in Kumbalangi to understand its culture better, before shooting began in September 2018.

The film was released in India and GCC territories on 7 February 2019. It received positive reviews, and has been listed by several publications as one of the best Malayalam films of the decade. The film also achieved considerable commercial success at the box office, grossing ₹39 crore worldwide, against a budget of ₹6.5 crore and gained cult film status. It was premiered on 24 May 2019 at the Habitat International Film Festival in Delhi, and also at the International Film Festival of Kerala where it won the NETPAC Award for Best Malayalam Film (Special Mention). It won several awards, including three Asianet Film Awards, six Vanitha Film Awards, four Kerala State Film Awards, seven CPC Cine Awards and two SIIMA Awards. Fahadh's character "Shammi" also developed a cult following with many of his dialogues becoming popular.

== Plot ==
Saji, Bonny, Bobby, and Franky are four half-brothers who share a fractured domestic life in a dilapidated, half-constructed house in the coastal village of Kumbalangi. Their complex family parentage stems from a past marriage between Saji's father and Bonny's mother, which subsequently produced Bobby and Franky. Following the patriarch's death, the mother abandoned the family to join a secluded religious mission, leaving the dysfunctional household without parental guidance. Saji, the eldest, suffers from severe anger management issues and frequently engages in violent physical brawls with Bobby, a cynical and unemployed youth. Franky, the youngest and a promising student, harbours deep resentment toward his elder brothers' reckless reputations, finding solace only in his relationship with Bonny, who is mute but highly protective of him.

The domestic status quo shifts when Bobby initiates a romantic relationship with a local woman named Baby. When Bobby proposes marriage, Baby insists that he formally approach her family for approval. Bobby convinces Saji to escort him to the meeting, where they confront Shammi, Baby’s intensely pompous, chauvinistic, and hyper-masculine brother-in-law. Shammi subtly demeans the brothers, ridiculing their family's notorious reputation among the villagers and leaving the proposal in limbo. Seeking to help his brother, Saji encourages Bobby to find employment, which he successfully does at a local fishery. Concurrently, Bonny develops a romantic attachment to Nylah, an American tourist residing at a waterfront homestay managed by Baby's family.

Domestic tensions boil over when a violent argument erupts between Saji and Franky, prompting Bonny to intervene and physically assault Saji to protect the youngest sibling. Overwhelmed by shame and isolation, Saji retreats to a local bar with his loyal friend, Vijay. In a severe state of drunken depression, Saji attempts to hang himself from a warehouse ceiling. Vijay rushes to intervene but tragically plummets to his death while saving Saji's life.

Consumed by survivor's guilt and immense remorse, Saji visits Vijay's home to apologize to his pregnant widow, Sathi, only to find her in active labor. He swiftly transports her to the hospital, where she delivers a baby girl. Lacking alternative support, Saji brings Sathi and her newborn back to the Kumbalangi house to care for them. Around the same time, Shammi uncovers Nylah’s romance with Bonny and evicts her from the homestay, prompting Bonny to bring her to the brothers' residence. The introduction of the two women radically alters the household dynamic; the brothers begin working together to maintain the home, finding a collective sense of purpose, empathy, and emotional healing.

During a regional wedding, a reformed Saji approaches Shammi once more to politely request a reconsideration of Bobby and Baby’s alliance, but Shammi flatly and arrogantly refuses. At home, Shammi gradually asserts an authoritarian, abusive grip over his wife's family, monitoring their actions and suppressing their independence. Suffocated by his controlling behavior, Baby resolves to elope with Bobby.

However, Shammi uncovers her elopement plans. His meticulously maintained facade cracks, escalating into a violent psychotic episode. He physically assaults Baby, her mother, and her sister, locking them inside the house to assert his absolute dominance. Becoming anxious when Baby abruptly stops responding to his communication, a worried Bobby resolves to check on her safety. Sensing the danger, Saji, Bonny, and Franky volunteer to join him.

The four brothers arrive at the residence and confront the armed and highly volatile Shammi. Utilizing their collective coordination and utilizing their background as local fishermen, the brothers successfully entangle Shammi in a large fishing net and subdue him after a chaotic physical struggle, freeing the traumatized women. The local authorities are alerted to apprehend Shammi. With the structural barriers to their relationship permanently dismantled, Bobby and Baby are happily reunited and marry, cementing the ultimate transformation of the four brothers into a unified, functional family.

== Cast ==
- Shane Nigam as Bobby Napoleon
- Fahadh Faasil as Shammi
- Soubin Shahir as Saji Napoleon
- Sreenath Bhasi as Bonny Napoleon
- Mathew Thomas as Franky Napoleon
- Anna Ben as Baby Mol, Bobby's love interest
- Grace Antony as Simmy, Shammi's wife
- Sooraj Pops as Prasanth, Bobby's friend
- Ramesh Thilak as Murugan aka Vijay
- Jasmine Mètivier as Nylah
- Riya Saira as Sumeesha
- Baiju Ezhupunna as Tony, Baby's and Simmy's Uncle
- Sheela Rajkumar as Sathi
- Ambika Rao as Baby and Simmy's Mother
- Ajith Moorkooth as Psychiatrist
- Ansal Palluruthy as Shyju
- Dileesh Pothan as Police Inspector Raju Unni (Cameo appearance)
- Lali PM as Leelamma, Mother to Bonny Napoleon, Bobby Napoleon & Franky Napoleon
- Poli Sharath as Bar DJ

== Production ==
=== Development ===
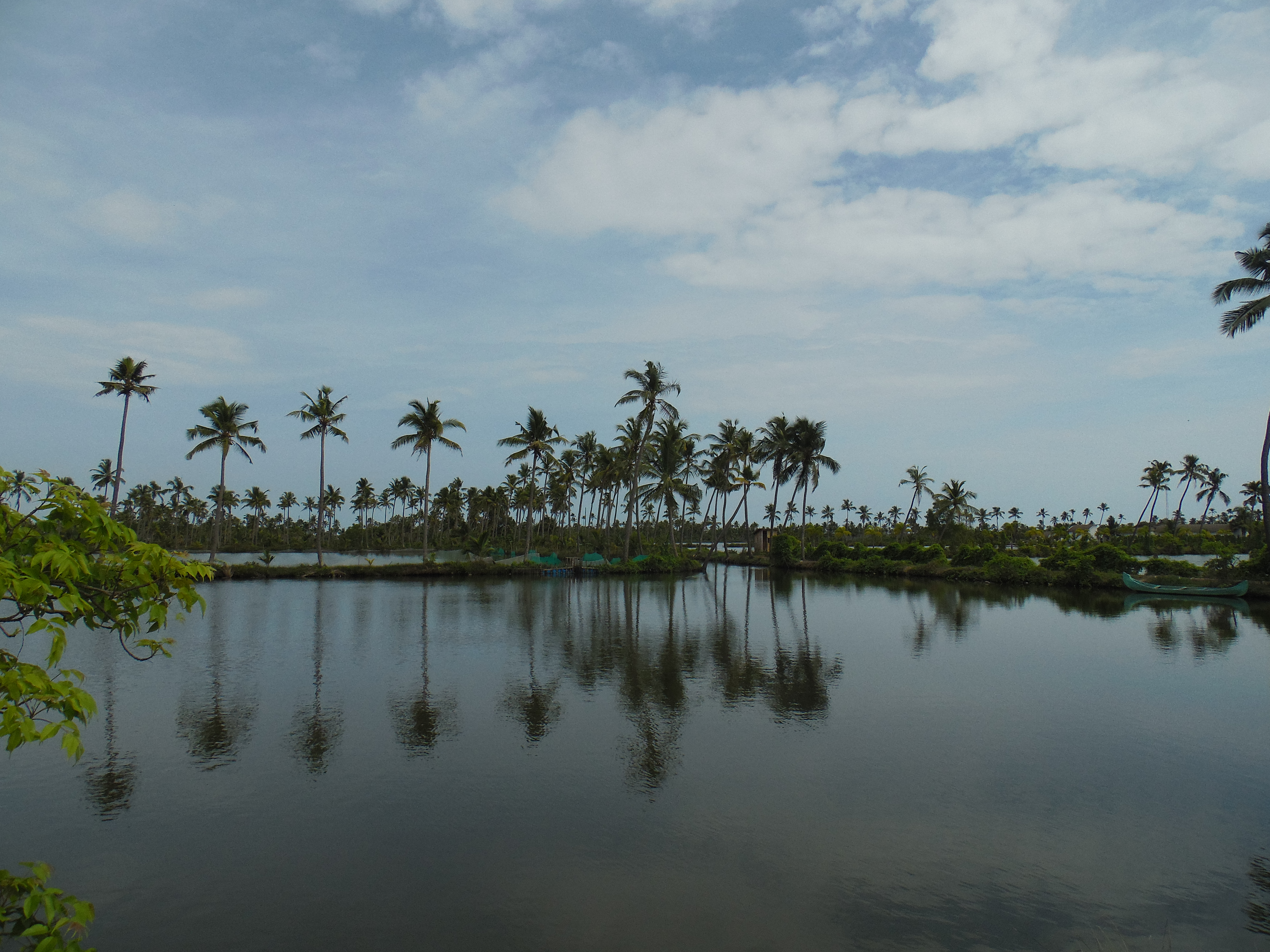
The village of Kumbalangi, which served as inspiration for the movie

Writer Syam Pushkaran conceived the idea for the film by drawing inspiration from the time he spent with his friends in his twenties in the village of Kumbalangi, which was near his hometown. In telling the story, Syam said he wanted to counter the negative stereotypes about the village and its people. Writing the script took around 5 years, during which time Syam worked on other films as well, but the final draft was completed in around six months. Syam clarified that the film was not based on any real-life incident or person and was a relatively difficult one to write. However, he has stated that the character of Saji was influenced by a man with suicidal tendencies he encountered in his village in his youth. In 2011, while he was co-writing Salt N' Pepper, Syam discussed the idea with its assistant director Madhu C. Narayanan, who became interested in making it his directorial debut. In 2016, the pair worked together again on Thondimuthalum Driksakshiyum (2017), after which they decided to focus on getting Kumbalangi Nights made.

=== Casting ===
Fahadh Faasil played the brother-in-law of Baby who is firmly opposed to her relationship with Bobby and ultimately goes to extreme measures to prevent them from uniting. Through the character, director Madhu aimed to depict the misogyny and toxic masculinity that passes for heroism in Kerala. When writer Syam initially approached Fahadh he had not expected that he would accept the role of the antagonist, explaining: "He was having a good run, doing successful family films. It was very courageous of him to agree to do this role." Shane Nigam was cast for the film early on in the production process. He played Bobby, the second-youngest brother who has been described by Nigam as a "lazy bum, someone who leads a responsibility-free life, and doesn't have any serious, long-term plans." He turns his life around for the girl he falls in love with. In an interview, he said that he lived like his character for around three months to the point that he found it difficult to recognise himself after the filming was done, and struggled to move on to his next role, in the 2019 film Ishq.

Soubin Shahir was approached to play the role of Saji even before his breakthrough performance in Sudani from Nigeria (2018) for which he earned a State Film Award. The eldest of the four brothers, Saji is a wastrel who lives off the earnings of his hardworking migrant friend, and regularly gets into violent fights with his younger brothers. Writer Syam said that the character was loosely based on a friend from his youth in Kumbalangi named Saji Napoleon, who had had suicidal tendencies. Sreenath Bhasi was initially offered the part of the Bobby. However, by the time the movie was slated to begin shooting, the directors thought he was more suitable as the second older brother, Bonny. Bonny is a mute who falls in love with an American woman who comes to Kumbalangi as a tourist. Bhasi described his character as "the grounded big brother" of the family. Mathew Thomas, a debut actor, was cast for the role after he was shortlisted from an audition held at his school. For the role of Franky, the youngest brother, he spent six months with the film crew in Kumbalangi, during which he learnt to cook, row boats, cast fishing nets and play football in the forward position.

Anna Ben played Baby, a determined young woman who has nursed a crush on Bobby since her school days and later dates him. Ben, an aspiring actress, responded to a casting call on Instagram for the movie and was subsequently selected through four rounds of auditions. She said she found it easy to identify with her character, explaining: "[Baby] is modern and traditional simultaneously, rooted, with her own point-of-view ... her clarity of thought, views on religion, and dialogues were all relatable. She sticks to her opinion, but isn't arrogant." Grace Antony had made her debut appearance in Happy Wedding (2016), which made Syam reach out to her for the movie. She played Simmy, Baby's older sister and Shammi's wife. A soft-spoken, traditional woman, Simmy is intimidated by her husband and speaks out against him only when he starts taunting Baby. Grace had also tried out for Baby's role, but was finally cast as Simmy. As her character was older to her, Grace said she imitated the mannerisms and body language of her mother and other housewives she observed for her performance.

=== Filming ===
Dileesh Pothan, who had directed Thondimuthalum Driksakshiyum, offered to produce the film during an ad shoot with Madhu. The film ended up being the debut production of Syam's and Pothan's newly formed production house, Working Class Hero. Meanwhile, Syam discussed the film and the character of Shammi with actor Fahadh Faasil while they were working on Maheshinte Prathikaaram (2016). Fahadh, who found the character "very layered and complicated", agreed to the part. Subsequently, he also decided to co-produce the film under the banner of Fahadh Faasil & Friends, the production company that he owned with his wife, actress Nazriya Nazim. Fahadh had no qualms about producing a film by the debut director, as he had already worked closely with Madhu, who was then an assistant director, on 22 Female Kottayam (2012). He explained his decision to co-produce the film, saying, "Meeting producers, convincing them, budgeting and more, takes a lot of time. I didn't want to go through any of that drill. Working with Syam [Syam], Dileesh [Pothan] and the like is a fun experience and it's very dear to me, so I also wanted to give it my all."

Once the script and main cast were finalised, Madhu rented a house in Kumbalangi and stayed there over a year to learn more about the place and local culture, leaving just two days before the shooting began. Many of the supporting actors were chosen during auditions held in the village itself. The four brothers’ house in the film was a set, built based on pictures of the interiors of different homes in the area. In order to give it a lived-in look, the crew collected used items and furniture from local households in exchange for fresh replacements. The algae in the surrounding water bodies were grown by the crew, a process which took 10 to 15 days. The film also used special effects to recreate the bioluminescence caused by sea sparkle, often sighted in Kumbalangi's water bodies. The film graded using DaVinci Resolve. Filming began in early September 2018. On the long period it took to make the film, Madhu said: "Considering the challenge that comes with a script populated by so many characters, we knew we had to approach everything patiently. Fleshing out all the characters and the surrounding details required a lot of time. All that preparation was needed just to get the entire story in a basic synopsis form."

== Themes ==
"There [is] this idea of ‘the complete man’, who can also be the dysfunctional man. This aura of a ‘complete man’ puts pressure on most men. He should be strong, he should not cry. And it’s from here that violence comes. I just want to tell men that it is okay to be emotional."

— Writer Syam Pushkaran, in an interview with The Indian Express, on toxic masculinity.

Kumbalangi Nights has been described as a new generation film, a Malayalam cinema movement characterised by its progressive themes and realistic screenplays. The film critiques hypermasculinity and patriarchy, morality, primarily through the juxtaposition of Shammi and Saji's characters. Writing for The Hindu, Arjun Jai Singh commented that "both men have psychological issues, but when Saji comes close to the abyss, he realises he must help himself: he goes to a doctor to cry out his emotions. Meanwhile, Shammi insists on being “a hero”." Neelima Menon of Firstpost opined that the film "not only succeeds in overthrowing the celebrated alpha male but also points out that in theory he is the villain of the story." Namrata Joshi summed up Shammi's character as "the acme of perverse and pathological masculinity that the film gets one up on."

The film has also been noted for its feminist undertones. Baby, Nylah, and the absent mother all exercise their free will and agency in their own lives – without a "knight in shining armor" – except, notably, when a man physically overpowers one of them. Isha Sengupta of The Indian Express pointed out how the onus of rehabilitating the grown men was not placed on the women, observing that they "serve as an incentive for the men and the situation at their household to change, and not agents who bring about it. They witness. They do not execute. [The men] take charge of their lives and mend their ties, as some enter the kitchen and some find their vocation."

== Music ==
The film's soundtrack album and score was composed by music director Sushin Shyam, who also contributed vocals to three of its songs. The Malayalam lyrics on the album were penned by writers Anwar Ali and Vinayak Sasikumar, and the English lyrics by Shyam's bandmate, Nezer Ahemed. The album was launched on 21 January 2019 by Bhavana Studios. The song "Silent Cat", which in the movie is shown as a love song by an American tourist, was sung by German-based artist Kezia Quental, also known as K.Zia.

In an interview, Sushin Shyam said that he was influenced by Italian music while making the album, owing to the similarities he found between the city of Venice, and Kumbalangi. He also revealed that working on the soundtrack was a challenge, explaining: "With a film of this nature, it was quite difficult to take a call on where to place the songs. Naturally, you become a little concerned about your music affecting the mood of the film or people not responding to it well." The songs went through several improvisations to accommodate the changes in the script. The soundtrack received generally positive reviews from critics, appreciating Shyam for his work.

== Release ==
The film released in India and Gulf Cooperation Council territories on 7 February 2019. It was released a week later in New Zealand, and two weeks later in Australia and the United Kingdom. After its theatrical run, the film premiered at the Habitat International Film Festival in Delhi on 24 May 2019, and was screened at the International Film Festival of Kerala on 6—13 December 2019.

== Reception ==
=== Box office ===
The film, which was made on a budget of ₹6.5 crore, had considerable success at the box office. It grossed ₹4.8 crore from the Kerala box office and ₹3.95 crore from Gulf Cooperation Council (GCC) territories in its opening weekend. In 11 days, the film's total earnings reached ₹20 crore worldwide, of which nearly 50 per cent ticket sales came from its home state and about 45 per cent from the GCC. It ran for seven weeks in Bangalore and Chennai, six in Mumbai and Hyderabad, and five in Delhi. By the first week of April 2019, the film has made ₹27.89 crore in India. By the end of its theatrical run, the film had grossed a total of ₹39 crore worldwide.

In the overseas market, Kumbalangi Nights grossed $475,987 from 36 screens in the United Arab Emirates in its opening weekend and $1,229,943 in eight weeks. It collected $51,406 from 71 theatres in the United Kingdom in the opening weekend there. The film grossed $109,713 (₹76.4 lakh) in the United States in eight weeks. It collected NZ$35,222 (₹17.18 lakh) in New Zealand and $10,617 (₹5.34 lakh) in Australia in two weeks, as well as $38,393 (₹27.21 lakh) in Canada in three weeks.

=== Critical reception ===
The film received highly positive reviews from critics, who praised its script, cinematography, and acting performances, in particular that of Fahadh and Soubin. The film appeared on many year-end and decade-end lists as one of the best Malayalam films of 2019 and the 2010s by several publications such as The Hindu, Mathrubhumi, and HuffPost India.

In a review for The Indian Express, G. Pramod Kumar called it "a subtle, but lucid and vivid poem about abandonment and redemption of human lives [...] The importance of love within the family, the brutality of patriarchy that even an eccentric man can exert, and the healing power of human touch and compassion are vividly depicted by both the writer Syam Pushakaran and director Madhu C. Narayanan." Writing for Cinema Express, Sajin Shrijith lauded the film as "one of those brilliantly written, once-in-a-blue-moon films that scores in every department ... Kumbalangi Nights is not being liberal just for the sake of it—it doesn't shove its progressive ideas down our throats. It doesn't preach; it simply shows." S. R. Praveen of The Hindu concurred, writing: "Madhu. C. Madhu has the cushion of Syam Pushkaran's perceptive and subtle writing for his directorial debut; even so he makes a mark of his own, helming the beautiful coming together of all the elements that make this film what it is." The Week's Sarath Ramesh Kuniyl agreed, rating the movie 4 stars out of 5 and deeming it "a rare gem" and a "must watch". Sify also gave a positive review, highlighting the cinematography, music and editing as "top-notch" and calling Soubin's performance "one of the finest displays of acting excellence."

A negative review came from film critic C. S. Venkiteswaran, who wrote: "In its compulsion to entertain and thrill without a pause, the narrative ends up incorporating in its stride all the clichés of the oldgen films – that of saving the damsel in distress, hero winning the heroine's heart and body, the climactic trouncing of the villain, and the happy reunion of the family in the end – all churning up a syrupy narrative that leaves the viewers at peace with themselves and the world." Joseph Antony echoed this sentiment in his review for Outlook, opining that "the artistry of the film loses out to its political ambition [with] barely any of the invigorating spirit that makes stories interesting" and citing Fahadh's performance as one of the movie's few saving graces.

The film has received polarising reviews for its depiction of mental health and counselling. The New Indian Express praised the movie for its attempt to break the stigmatisation surrounding counselling, writing, "A counselling session has many misconceptions attached to it, holding many back from reaching out to a professional. As [Saji] walks out [of a therapy session] with a light heart, another truth is demystified for the Malayali audience - that of what therapy actually involves." India Independent Films also commended the scene for being "played out subtly, and with immense respect to his state of mind ... [it] marks a watershed for depicting clinical mental health issues with the sensitivity they deserve." However, CNBC TV18 criticised its choice of an apparently mentally unwell man as the antagonist, when his actions could have just as easily been done by a healthy person. Film critic Saibal Chatterjee pointed out that mental illness "is a disease to be treated. Instead, Shammi becomes an embodiment of all that is wrong with masculinity ... [the film is not] sensitive to the sensibilities of those suffering mental illness."

== Accolades ==
Award (Note: Awards, festivals and organisations are in alphabetical order.)	Date of ceremony (Note: Date is linked to the article about the awards held that year, wherever possible.)	Category	Recipient(s)	Result	Ref.
Aravindan Puraskaram	15 March 2020	Best Debutante Director	Madhu C. Narayanan	Won	
Asianet Film Awards	6 February 2020	Best Actor (Special Jury Mention)	Soubin Shahir	Won	
Asianet Film Awards	6 February 2020	Best Supporting Actor (Female)	Grace Antony	Won	
Asianet Film Awards	6 February 2020	Best New Face	Anna Ben	Won	
CPC Cine Awards	16 February 2020	Best Movie	Kumbalangi Nights	Won	
CPC Cine Awards	16 February 2020	Best Scriptwriter	Syam Pushkaran	Won	
CPC Cine Awards	16 February 2020	Best Actress in a Lead Role	Anna Ben	Won	
CPC Cine Awards	16 February 2020	Best Background Score	Sushin Shyam	Won	
CPC Cine Awards	16 February 2020	Best Original Song	"Cherathukal" by Sushin Shyam, Anwar Ali and Sithara Krishnakumar	Won	
CPC Cine Awards	16 February 2020	Best Editor	Saiju Sreedharan	Won	
CPC Cine Awards	16 February 2020	Best Production Design	Jothish Shankar	Won	
Film Critics Circle of India	14 December 2019	Best Film	Kumbalangi Nights	Nominated	
Gollapudi Srinivas National Award	12 August 2020	Best Debutante Director	Madhu C. Narayanan	Won	
International Film Festival of Kerala	6—13 December 2019	NETPAC Award: Malayalam Film (Special Mention)	Kumbalangi Nights	Won	
Kerala State Film Awards	13 October 2020	Best Film with Popular Appeal and Aesthetic Value	Kumbalangi Nights	Won	
Kerala State Film Awards	13 October 2020	Best Character Actor	Fahadh Faasil	Won	
Kerala State Film Awards	13 October 2020	Best Music Director	Sushin Shyam	Won	
Kerala State Film Awards	13 October 2020	Best Art Director	Jothish Shankar	Won	
Padmarajan Award	23 May 2020	Best Director	Madhu C. Narayanan	Won	
South Indian International Movie Awards	18 September 2021	Best Film – Malayalam	Kumbalangi Nights	Nominated	
South Indian International Movie Awards	18 September 2021	Best Cinematographer – Malayalam	Shyju Khalid	Nominated	
South Indian International Movie Awards	18 September 2021	Best Supporting Actor – Malayalam	Shane Nigam	Nominated	
South Indian International Movie Awards	18 September 2021	Best Supporting Actress – Malayalam	Grace Antony	Nominated	
South Indian International Movie Awards	18 September 2021	Best Actor in a Negative Role – Malayalam	Fahadh Faasil	Nominated	
South Indian International Movie Awards	18 September 2021	Best Male Debut – Malayalam	Mathew Thomas	Nominated	
South Indian International Movie Awards	18 September 2021	Best Female Debut – Malayalam	Anna Ben	Won	
South Indian International Movie Awards	18 September 2021	Best Debut Director – Malayalam	Madhu C. Narayanan	Nominated	
South Indian International Movie Awards	18 September 2021	Best Debut Producer – Malayalam	Working Class Hero	Nominated	
South Indian International Movie Awards	18 September 2021	Best Music Director – Malayalam	Sushin Shyam	Won	
South Indian International Movie Awards	18 September 2021	Best Lyricist – Malayalam	Anwar Ali – ("Cherathukal")	Nominated	
South Indian International Movie Awards	18 September 2021	Best Female Playback Singer – Malayalam	Sithara Krishnakumar – ("Cherathukal")	Nominated	
Vanitha Film Awards	9 February 2020	Best Movie	Kumbalangi Nights	Won	
Vanitha Film Awards	9 February 2020	Best Scriptwriter	Syam Pushkaran	Won	
Vanitha Film Awards	9 February 2020	Best Supporting Actor	Soubin Shahir	Won	
Vanitha Film Awards	9 February 2020	Best Debutant Actor (Male)	Mathew Thomas	Won	
Vanitha Film Awards	9 February 2020	Best Debutant Actor (Female)	Anna Ben	Won	
Vanitha Film Awards	9 February 2020	Best Star Pair	Shane Nigam & Anna Ben	Won	
