= The Down Troddence =

Indian thrash metal band

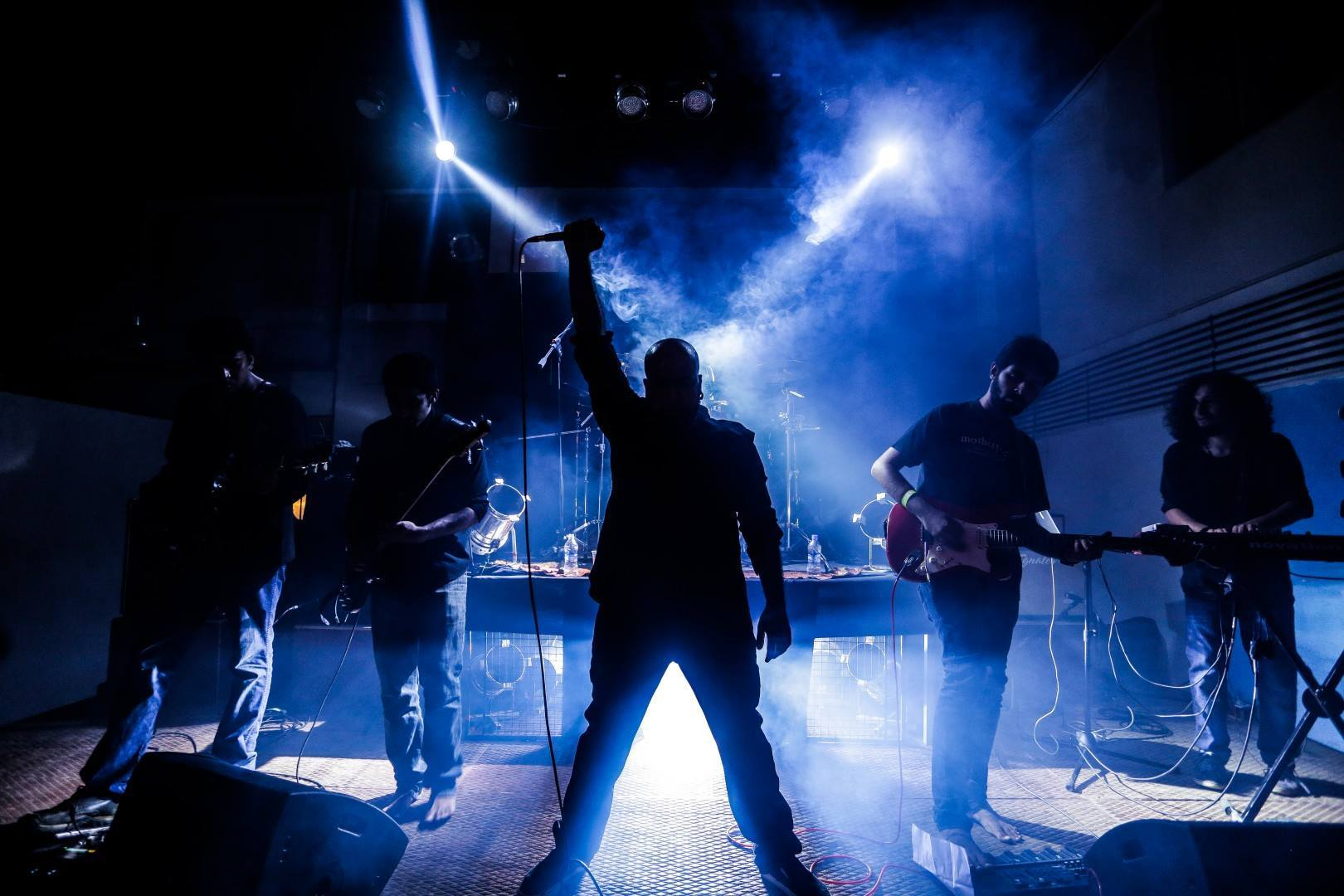
- The Down Troddence at Counterculture, Bangalore in 2014

Background information
- Origin: Kannur, Kerala, India
- Genres: Thrash metal, groove metal, folk metal, progressive metal
- Years active: 2009–present
- Labels: Independent, Think Music
- Members: Munz; Varun Raj; Nezer Ahemed; Sushin Shyam; Ganesh Radhakrishnan; Advaith Mohan
- Past members: Rinoy Balan; Prayag MP; Shaib
- Website: www.thedowntroddence.com

The Down Troddence (TDT) is an Indian heavy metal band from Kannur district, Kerala, formed in 2009. The band consists of vocalist Munz, guitarists Varun Raj and Advaith Mohan, bassist Nezer Ahemed, Sushin Shyam on synths and keyboard, and drummer Ganesh Radhakrishnan.

The band's music is characterized by a fusion of thrash and groove metal with traditional Kerala folk elements, notably incorporating the ritualistic art form Theyyam. Their lyrics frequently address themes of social injustice, discrimination, and the struggles of marginalized communities in India.

TDT's debut album, How Are You? We Are Fine, Thank You, released in 2014, garnered critical acclaim and won multiple awards, including Best Album and Best Band at the Rolling Stone India Metal Awards. This was followed by the single "Fight. React. Be a Part!" in 2019 after a brief hiatus. The band returned with new material in 2025, releasing singles like "Maharani" featuring Carnatic vocalist T. M. Krishna, and "Ejjathi", from their album As You All Know, This Is How It Is, released in 2025.

== History ==
=== 2008: Band formation ===
The Down Troddence originated in 2009 as a studio project named Ultimatum, initiated by guitarist Varun Raj and vocalist Munz. They expanded the lineup by bringing in keyboardist Sushin Shyam, who had previously collaborated with Varun on a project called 25 Aug, along with drummer Prayag MP, guitarist Rinoy Balan, and bassist Shaib. Following Shaib's departure for personal reasons, Nezer Ahemed took over bass duties. After releasing their first single, "Death Vanity", Prayag was replaced by drummer Ganesh Radhakrishnan, formerly of the progressive metal band Purple Blood.

The band gained attention with the release of the music video for their single "Shiva", which won the Best Music Video award at the IndieGo South Asian Music Awards in 2011. Subsequently, the band members relocated to different cities: Munz, Nezer, and Ganesh moved to Bangalore, while Sushin shifted to Chennai to work as a studio programmer for music director Deepak Dev. During this period, Rinoy left the band and was replaced by guitarist Advaith Mohan from the Chennai-based band Iterate.

=== 2014 - 2019: How Are You? We Are Fine, Thank You ===
After releasing three independent singles prior to 2012, The Down Troddence embarked on creating their debut full-length album. By mid-October 2012, pre-production for nine tracks was completed, and Keshav Dhar of Skyharbor agreed to produce the album. Recording sessions took place in Bangalore in November. The album, titled How Are You? We Are Fine, Thank You, was released on January 1, 2014, at CounterCulture in Bangalore. Upon release, the album received critical acclaim for its innovative fusion of genres and poignant lyrical content. It won eight awards at the Rolling Stone India Metal Awards 2014, including Best Album, Best Song, Best Band, Best Guitarist, and Best Artwork. Reviewers praised the album's production quality and its ability to balance aggressive metal riffs with subtle folk-based elements.

In December 2019, The Down Troddence released the protest single "Fight. React. Be a Part!" featuring Kel from the Kerala metal band Heretic. The song was a direct response to the Indian government's Citizenship Amendment Act (CAA) and the proposed National Register of Citizens (NRC). The track combines aggressive metal riffs with politically charged lyrics, urging listeners to actively oppose injustice. Its accompanying lyric video includes news footage and protest imagery, reinforcing its message of resistance.

=== 2025: As You All Know, This Is How It Is ===
In 2025, The Down Troddence unveiled their second studio album, As You All Know, This Is How It Is marking their return after over a decade since their debut. The album, set to feature ten tracks, is being released under the South Indian label Think Music.

The first single, "Maharani", was released on February 20, 2025, and features renowned Carnatic vocalist T.M. Krishna. The track blends progressive metal with classical Indian music, addressing themes of resistance and empowerment. Its music video, directed by Rajaram Rajendran, presents dystopian visuals symbolizing societal oppression.

Following this, the band released "Ejjathi", their first song entirely in Malayalam. The track confronts issues of casteism, patriarchy, and colorism. The accompanying music video was directed by filmmaker Chidambaram S. Poduval of Manjummel Boys.

== Awards and major performances ==
Some of the major achievements of the band include:

- Best Band – Critic's Choice – Rolling Stone India Metal Awards 2014
- Best Band – Popular Choice – Rolling Stone India Metal Awards 2014
- Best Song (Nagavalli) – Critic's Choice – Rolling Stone India Metal Awards 2014
- Best Song (Nagavalli) – Popular Choice – Rolling Stone India Metal Awards 2014
- Best Album (How are you? We are fine. Thank you) – Critic's Choice – Rolling Stone India Metal Awards 2014
- Best Album (How are you? We are fine. Thank you) – Popular Choice – Rolling Stone India Metal Awards 2014
- Best Guitarist Award (Varun Raj) – Rolling Stone India Metal Awards 2014
- Best Artwork (Abhijith VB) – Rolling Stone India Metal Awards 2014
- Best Music Video Award (Shiva) – IndieGo South Asia Music Awards 2011
- Best Vocalist Award (Munz) – IndieGo South Asia Music Awards 2011
- Best Instrumental (Ortniavis) – IndieGo South Asia Music Awards 2011
- Opened for UK Based band Cypher 16 in Bangalore (2011)
- Best Keyboardist (Sushin) – Decibels Semi-Pro Band Competition (Saarang 2012)
- Best Band – Festember 2012

== Musical style and influences ==
The Down Troddence has been noted for its blend of conventional thrash and groove metal with traditional Kerala folk music elements, art forms such as Theyyam in particular. The band incorporates traditional folk sounds and instruments in the form of ambient layers in their music. Rhythm structures used in their songs too are primarily inspired by folk music.

Lyrically the band has a strong philosophy of talking about inequalities and injustices which are present in India's social and political systems. A common theme in their music is the effort to project the voice of the under-privileged and down-trodden people.

== Band members ==
Current members

- Munz – vocals (2009–present)
- Varun Raj – guitar (2009–present)
- Sushin Shyam – keyboards, backing vocals (2009–present)
- Nezer Ahemed – bass, backing vocals (2009–present)
- Ganesh Radhakrishnan – drums (2010–present)
- Advaith Mohan – guitar (2012–present)

Former members

- Rinoy Balan – guitar (2009–2012)
- Prayag MP – drums (2009–2009)
- Shaib – bass (2009–2009)

== Discography ==
=== Studio albums ===
List of studio albums, with selected details
Title	Album details
How Are You? We Are Fine, Thank You	Released: 1 January 2014; Label: Self-released

== See also ==
- Indian rock
- Kryptos (band)
- Bhayanak Maut
- Nicotine (band)
- Inner Sanctum (band)
- Demonic Resurrection
- Bloodywood
