= Sushin Shyam =

Indian composer and playback singer

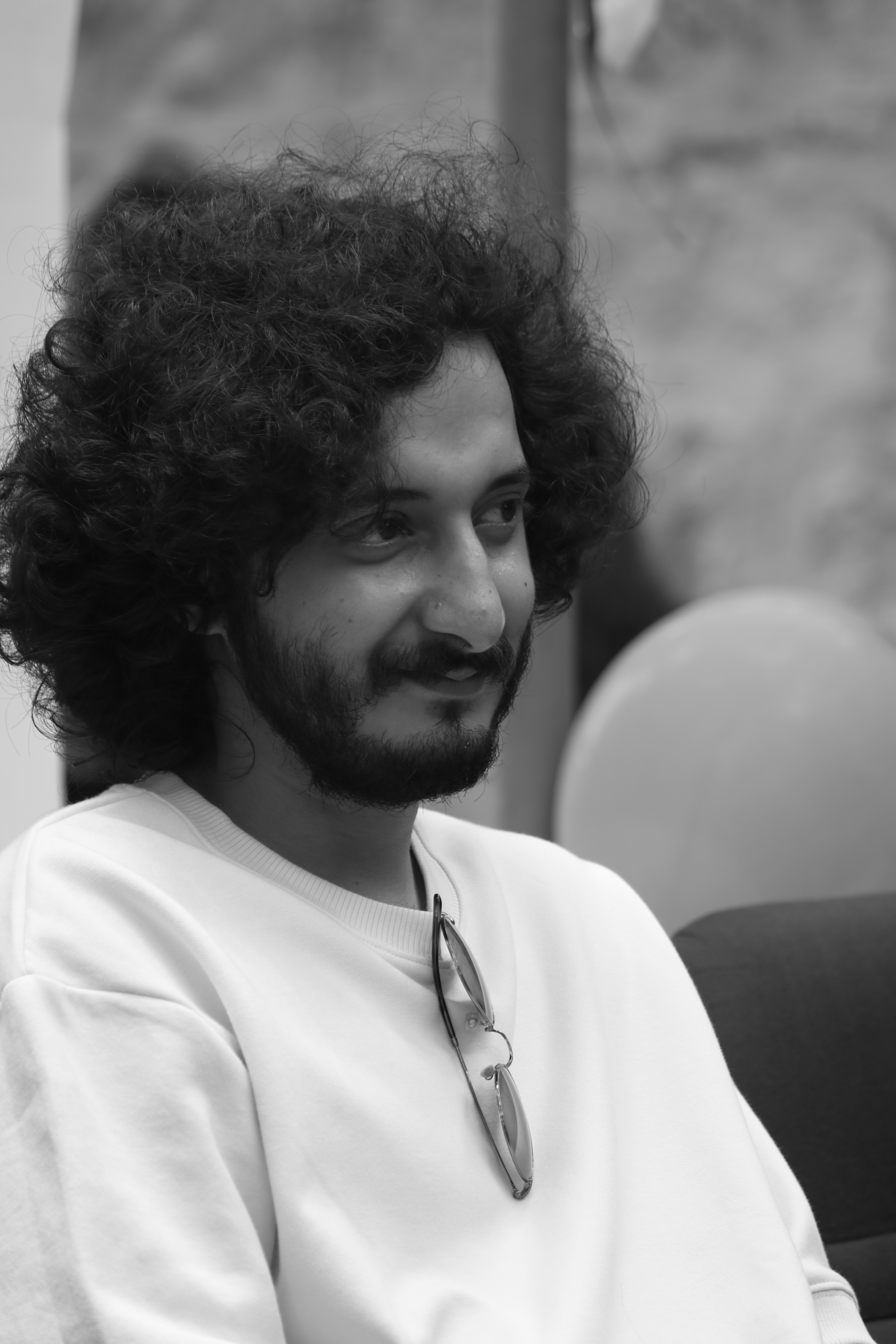
- Sushin in 2022

Background information
- Born: Thalassery, Kannur, Kerala, India
- Genres: Filmi; classical music; world music; EDM; trap music
- Occupations: Music composer; Instrumentalist; Singer
- Instruments: Keyboard; guitar; vocals
- Years active: 2012–present
- Labels: Sony Music India; Muzik247; Saregama; Think Music; 123Musix
- Member of: The Down Troddence
- Spouse: Uthara Krishnan (m. 2024)

Sushin Shyam is an Indian music composer, instrumentalist, and singer primarily associated with Malayalam cinema. He is also a founding member of the folk metal band The Down Troddence. In 2025 July 4th, he made his debut as an independent music artist with the music video Ray. He is a two-time winner of Kerala State Film Award for Best Music Director, for Kumbalangi Nights in 2019 and Bougainvillea in 2024.

He is known for his contributions to the films Varathan (2018), Kumbalangi Nights (2019), Minnal Murali (2021), Bheeshma Parvam (2022), Romancham (2023), Kannur Squad (2023), Manjummel Boys (2024) and Aavesham (2024). His work on Kumbalangi Nights earned him the Kerala State Film Award for Best Music Director in 2019.

== Early life ==
Sushin Shyam was born at Thalasserry in Kannur district of Kerala to Shyam Prakash and Kalavathi. He studied at St. Joseph's School and Mambaram School in Thalassery. Under his father's guidance, a musician himself, Sushin learned to play the keyboard from an early age, including performing on stage at the age of 3. He relocated to Chennai in pursuit of new prospects within the music industry. He honed his skills during a two-year stint working with the music director Deepak Dev.

== Career ==
Sushin lent his voice to a song, "Thaazhvaram" for the film Neelakasham Pachakadal Chuvanna Bhoomi.

Sushin's subsequent projects included composing the background score for Lord Livingstone 7000 Kandi in 2015 and for Kismath in 2016. He also created a song, "Kissa Pathiyil," for the latter film, both of which were well received by audiences.

Sushin has appeared in short or guest roles in movies including Grandmaster, Thattathin Marayathu, Da Thadiya, Honey Bee, Guppy, Mayaanadhi and Nadikar

== Personal life ==
He married Uthara Krishnan on 30 October 2024 at Sree Poornathrayeesa Temple, Thrippunithura. Uthara is niece of former actress Parvathy Jayaram.

== Discography ==
=== As music composer ===
List of Sushin Shyam film credits as music composer
Year	Title	Songs	Score	Notes
2014	Sapthamashree Thaskaraha	No	Yes	Score only
2015	Lord Livingstone 7000 Kandi	No	Yes	Score only
2016	Kismath	Yes	Yes	Score and 1 song only
2017	Ezra	Yes	Yes	Score and 2 songs only
2017	The Great Father	No	Yes	
2017	Villain	No	Yes	
2018	Maradona	Yes	Yes	
2018	Rosapoo	Yes	Yes	
2018	Varathan	Yes	Yes	
2018	Lilli	Yes	Yes	
2019	Kumbalangi Nights	Yes	Yes	
2019	Virus	Yes	Yes	
2020	Anjaam Pathiraa	Yes	Yes	
2020	Trance	No	Yes	Score co-composed with Jackson Vijayan
2020	Kappela	Yes	Yes	
2020	Kilometers and Kilometers	No	Yes	
2021	Mālik	Yes	Yes	
2021	Kurup	Yes	Yes	Score and 3 songs only
2021	Minnal Murali	Yes	Yes	Score and 4 songs
2022	Bheeshma Parvam	Yes	Yes	
2022	Ariyippu	No	Yes	
2023	Romancham	Yes	Yes	Also co-producer
2023	Kannur Squad	Yes	Yes	
2024	Manjummel Boys	Yes	Yes	
2024	Aavesham	Yes	Yes	
2024	Ullozhukku	Yes	Yes	
2024	Bougainvillea	Yes	Yes	
2026	Patriot	Yes	Yes	
2026	Balan - The Boy	Yes	Yes	
2026	Scene	Yes	Yes	Tamil debut
2026	Gracias El Clasico †	Yes	Yes	
2026	Nedumkandam Miracle †	Yes	Yes	

Key
†	Denotes films that have not yet been released

=== As playback singer ===
- Sources: malayalachalachithram.com

List of Sushin Shyam film credits as playback singer
Year	Song	Film	Music Director/Composer	Co singer(s)
2013	"Thaazhvaram"	Neelakasham Pachakadal Chuvanna Bhoomi	Rex Vijayan	
2014	"Kai Ethum Doorathu"	Sapthamashree Thaskaraha	Rex Vijayan	
2018	Nilapakshi	Maradona	Himself	Neha Nair
2018	"Varum"	Maradona	Himself	Neha Nair
2018	Kochiloru Kappaladuthe	Rosapoo	Himself	Munna
2018	"Padinjattodiyal Kadalu"	Rosapoo	Himself	Maqbool Mansoor
2018	Munniloru Swargam	Rosapoo	Himself	Suchith Suresan
2018	"Mutta Paatu"	Rosapoo	Himself	Jassie Gift, Anthony Daasan
2018	"Oduvile Theeyayi"	Varathan	Himself	Neha Nair
2019	"Cherathukal"	Kumbalangi Nights	Himself	Sithara Krishnakumar
2019	"Ezhutha Katha"	Kumbalangi Nights	Himself	
2019	"Lagoon Chill"	Kumbalangi Nights	Himself	
2019	"Spread Love"	Virus	Himself	Shelton Pinheiro, Madonna Sebastian, Muhsin Parari
2022	"Be Notorious"	Bheeshma Parvam	Himself	Hamsika Iyer, Yogi B
2022	"Aadharanjali"	Romancham	Himself	Madhuvanthi Narayan
2022	"Athmave Poo"	Romancham	Himself	
2024	"Kuthanthram"	Manjummel Boys	Himself	Vedan
2024	"Kuthanthram" (Extended Version)	Manjummel Boys	Himself	Vedan
2024	"Thaai Manam"	Manjummel Boys	Himself	Urmila Krishnan
2024	"Premalola"	Sureshanteyum Sumalathayudeyum Hrudayahariyaya Pranayakadha	Dawn Vincent	

=== Indie Projects ===
List of independent singles by Sushin Shyam
Year	Title	Role	Notes
2025	"Ray"	Composer, Singer	Directed by Vimal Chandran; lyrics by Vinayak Sasikumar.

== Awards and nominations ==
List of Sushin Shyam awards
Year	Award	Category	Work	Result	Notes
2019	SIIMA	Best Music Director	Varathan	Won	
2020	Kerala State Film Award	Best Music Director	Kumbalangi Nights	Won	
2020	CPC Cine Awards	Best Original Song	"Cherathukal" (from Kumbalangi Nights)	Won	
2020	CPC Cine Awards	Best Background Score	Kumbalangi Nights	Won	
2020	Mirchi Music Awards South	Best Album	Kumbalangi Nights	Won	
2020	Mirchi Music Awards South	Listener's Choice Song of the year	"Uyiril Thodum" (from Kumbalangi Nights)	Won	
2020	Mirchi Music Awards South	Viral Song of the year	"Uyiril Thodum" (from Kumbalangi Nights)	Won	
2021	SIIMA	Best Music Director	Kumbalangi Nights	Won	
2025	Kerala State Film Awards	Best Music Director	Bougainvillea	Won	
2026	Filmfare Awards South	Best Music Director – Malayalam	Aavesham	Won	

== See also ==
- Kerala State Film Award for Best Music Director
- Bheeshma Parvam (soundtrack)
- Kumbalangi Nights (soundtrack)
