= Festember =

Annual Indian cultural festival

- Genre: Cultural
- Frequency: Annual
- Locations: Tiruchirappalli, India
- Founded: 1975
- Most recent: 2026
- Attendance: 500+ colleges
- Organiser: National Institute of Technology, Tiruchirappalli
- Filing status: Student Run, Non-Profit Organization
- Website: festember.com
- Fest To Remember

Festember is a cultural festival organised at National Institute of Technology, Tiruchirappalli (NITT). It is a 4-day event held annually in the third week of September. It was first incepted in 1975 by then students of NITT, and has now evolved to be one of the largest cultural festivals organised by a student community in Southern India. With humble beginnings as a fest with zero rupee budget allocation, it grew rapidly with sponsorships and collaborations. It now boasts an annual participation of more than 15,000 students from over 500 collegiate student communities across India.

== History ==
Festember began in 1975 as an intra-college fest. Within a few years, it transformed into a fully fledged inter-college event. Almost 40 years later, it continues to dominate the South Indian college cultural scene, winning the title of Best Cultural Event of the Year, an award given by the Tamil Nadu State Government, in 2005.

Since the first Festember in 1975, participating colleges compete to win possession of the Festember Rolling Trophy (called the Ilayaraja Trophy). Several celebrities and dignitaries have graced the festival, including Illaiyaraja, Javed Ali, Naresh Iyer, Anuradha Sriram and Ganesh and Kumaresh amongst others.

'Festember', a term coined by one of the then REC-T students, stands for a "Fest to Remember". It started as a zero budget fest, in a little town called Thuvakudi, and every department of the college pitched in within the area of their expertise. For the first editions, design and ambience were overseen by the Architecture Department. The shields and medals were forged in the workshops of the Mechanical Engineering department.

The college that gets the most points across several events wins the Festember Rolling Trophy. The Rolling Trophy was originally named the "Ilayaraja Trophy" after the maestro himself performed at Festember in 1978. The Festember' X Rolling Trophy was won by Vellore Institute of Technology, while the Festember '11 Rolling Trophy was won by Sastra University. Sastra University won it again in 2012, and managed to maintain their streak for nine consecutive years, until 2019.

Festember '12 and '13 saw the ProShows being conducted in a temporary open-air theatre, a first for Trichy. Festember '14 was the first edition to host the ProShows in a newly constructed open-air theatre, named the Golden Jubilee Convention Hall (GJCH), with a capacity of more than 5,000 people. Festember '15 introduced the Indie stage for the first time, while Festember 16' saw a new addition in the name of Culture Gully where a couple of informal events were held. In 2017, the official Festember Blog was launched on Medium, serving as a gateway for the creative outlet that Festember strives for.

=== Themes ===
Festember has explored a myriad of themes since its inception in 1975. The organizers have gone to great lengths to express and showcase the theme through ambience and theme-specific events. Mascots each year have also been designed and adapted to communicate the theme.

Year	Theme	Tagline	==== Sponsors ====	ProShow Artists	==== Guest lectures ====
2020	Fantasy Realm	-	CelebritySchool, LensFit, Fever 104 FM, Radio One (India), Film Companion, DHL, Bank of Baroda	Rajhesh Vaidhya, Vijay Yesudas, Shilpa Rao, Mali, Stephen Devassy, Naveen Richard	Sanjay Pinto, Shweta Mohan, Ganesh Venkatraman, Ehsaan Noorani, Haricharan, Nikhita Gandhi, Jaaved Jaaferi, Harun Robert
2019	Cinema Paradiso	Relive the Reel	JioSaavn, City Union Bank	Karthik Iyer, Masala Coffee, Benny Dayal, WACX	Anu Hasan, Naresh Iyer, Nathan Schroeder
2018	An Arabian Odyssey	-	British Council (Title Sponsor), City Union Bank	Sunidhi Chauhan, Pineapple Express, Skrat, Switcheroo, DJ Sabrina Terence	P. Vasu , Ashwin Sanghi , Nithya Menen , Aruna Sairam , Karthik , Karan Arjun Singh, Shakthisree Gopalan
2017	The Orient	Rise and Rave	OnePlus (Title Sponsor), Maruti Suzuki Colors of Youth, City Union Bank	The Non-Violinist Project, DJ Shaan, Red Bull Tour Bus featuring RJD and Thermal and a Quarter, Amit Trivedi	Srinivas, Jonty Rhodes, Baradwaj Rangan, Michael Karp
2016	Cultural Syncretism	Bond Boundlessly	City Union Bank (Title Sponsor), Coke Studio (India), MAK Lubricants	Guns n Hoses, Ambi Subramaniam, Bindu Subramaniam, Sachin–Jigar, Aceaxe	Sid Sriram, Mahesh Dattani, Suresh Triveni, S. Sowmya, Pratap Pothen, Sean D’Mello (Pages)
2015	Les Automatistes	Break the Monotony	Paragon (title sponsor), The Times of India, Luvit, Coca-Cola	Rukmini Vijayakumar, Kash Trivedi, Alvar and Millas, Mushroom Lake, The Family Cheese, The Black Letters, Skrat, Shakthisree Gopalan, Pritam Chakraborty, Abhijeet Sawant, Antara Mitra, Nakash Aziz, Aditi Singh Sharma	Prashant Bhushan, Harish Iyer, Anita Ratnam, Unni Krishnan
2014	Hawaii	Ride the Hawaiian Tide		Vishal–Shekhar, Candice Redding, Karthick Iyer, Avial, Shakthisree Gopalan	Jatin Das, Parthiv Shah, Ananda Shankar Jayant, Kaneez Surka, Alicia Souza, Anu Sridharan
2013	Halloween	Be There But Beware	Adobe (Title sponsor), Hero, Nimbuzz, Celkon mobiles	Salim–Sulaiman, Shakthisree Gopalan, R. Prasanna, Baiju Dharmajan Syndicate, Benny Dayal, Shraddha Pandit	–
2012	Retro	It's Playback Time	Nimbuzz, Cadbury 5 Star, Aircel, Coca-Cola, Asus, Canara Bank, Appy Fizz	Andrea Jeremiah, Suraj Jagan, Benny Dayal, Groove #3, Agam, Punya Srinivas, Robo Shankar, Evam	–
2011	Las Vegas	Get lucky	DHL, Triton Musicz, Canara Bank, Peta, Vasan Eye Care, SS Music	Javed Ali, Suchitra, Vijay Prakash, Motherjane, Ganesh and Kumaresh, Crazy Mohan	–
2010	Wild West	Ride the Extreme		Naresh Iyer, Srinivas, Anuradha Sriram Suchitra	–
2009	–	Rewind...Press Play...Unwind	Vodafone (Main Sponsor)	Kadri Gopalnath, Benny Dayal, Bandish	–
2008	–	Tune In Drop Out	Airtel (Title Sponsor)	Sivamani, Karthik	–

== Guest lectures ==
Over the past few years, Festember has served a huge number of disquisitions to the populace. The guest lectures portion of the festival was incorporated with an intent to ignite and inspire the audience. Furthermore, it acts as a pedestal for the distinguished to propagate their valued experiences.

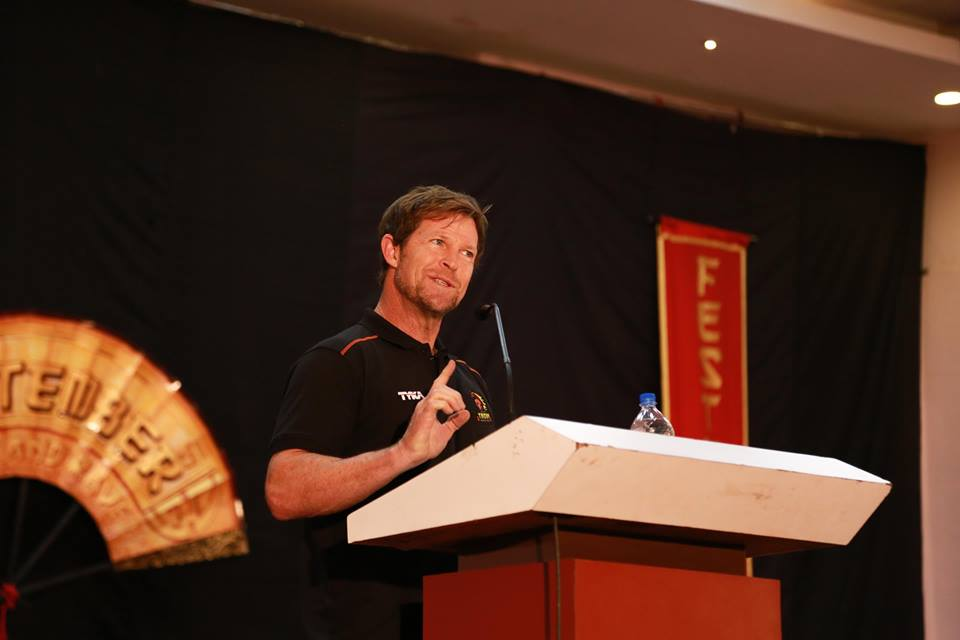
Jonty Rhodes sharing his experiences and insights with the students at Carpe Diem, Festember ‘17

=== Carpe Diem ===
'Carpe Diem' (derived from the Latin phrase for 'seize the day'), the primary guest lecture series of Festember, was introduced in 2014 with the aim of bringing down some of the most inspiring, talented and accomplished individuals from around the world, to get to know them on a personal level and draw motivation and encouragement from their journey to success.

Carpe Diem has hosted various eminent personalities in the past, including Jonty Rhodes (former South African cricketer), Sid Sriram (Indian-American music producer, playback singer, and songwriter), Mahesh Dattani (Sahitya Akademi Award-winning Indian director, actor, playwright and writer), Kaneez Surka (stand-up comic), Baradwaj Rangan (renowned film critic, former deputy editor of The Hindu), Prashant Bhushan (Indian lawyer, activist and politician) and many more.

In 2018, Carpe Diem stepped up its game a notch further with a total of seven guest lectures for the first time since its inception. This year, Festember had the honour of hosting the likes of Ashwin Sanghi (renowned novelist, also known as 'The Dan Brown of India'), Aruna Sairam (acclaimed Indian classical vocalist and Padma Shree Awardee, also known as the music ambassador of India), P. Vasu (Indian director, writer and actor), Karthik (Indian playback singer who has sung popular songs in multiple languages), and Karan Arjun Singh (acclaimed foley artist who has worked for films like Baahubali, Rangoon and many more).

One of the biggest crowd attractions was the Guest Lecture by Nithya Menen (eminent Indian film actress and playback singer). The valediction ceremony of Festember 2018 witnessed a Guest Lecture by the chief guest, Shakthisree Gopalan (Indian vocalist and songwriter, who has collaborated with major stalwarts in the music industry, including A.R. Rahman, and Anirudh Ravichander).

In 2019, Festember witnessed an accomplished and assorted line up of speakers under Carpe Diem with a total of five guest lectures. Festember had the honour of hosting the likes of Naresh Iyer (acclaimed Indian vocalist and a National awardee ), Anu Hasan (a renowned entrepreneur, TV host, author and so much more), Sagarika Ghose (an Indian journalist, news anchor, author and columnist who has worked at The Times, Outlook and The Indian Express), Vijay Amirtraj (former tennis player and Padmashree Awardee).

One of the main highlights was the guest lecture by Nathan Schroeder (a renowned concept artist, and the mastermind behind the illustrations of Hollywood's greatest blockbusters, including Captain America: Civil War, Jurassic World, X-Men and The Avengers ).

Festember ’20 raised the bar of Carpe Diem, as Festember hosted the most sought-after personalities in this virtual edition, including Álex Rodrigo (Creator and writer, known for the popular Netflix series Money Heist)), Shweta Mohan (leading playback singer of South Indian cinema), Viswanathan Anand (Indian chess grandmaster and former world chess champion), Cathy Cassidy (English author of young adult fiction), Christopher C Doyle (an Indian fantasy and mythology author), Julio Macat (Argentine-American cinematographer).

=== Vox Populi ===
Festember 2018 saw the blossoming of a new Guest Lecture series, Vox Populi (derived from the Latin phrase for 'the voice of the people'), which aims to bring down the unknown heroes of our country and give them a platform to make sure their awe-inspiring stories don't go unheard. Their exceptional tales are sure to leave a mark and motivate one and all to strive to make an impression.

The first edition of this series was initiated by Mrs Sneha Mohandoss, the founder of Food Bank-India, a charitable initiative to feed the hungry and to reduce food wastage.

The second edition of Vox Populi was honoured by Rathika Ramasamy, the first woman to strike an international reputation as a wildlife photographer and also the only woman to be chosen as one of the Top 20 best photographers of India by “The Birds of India.”

The third virtual edition of Vox Populi had the honour of hosting Sanjay Pinto, An advocate, columnist, author of three books and former resident editor of NDTV 24×7.

=== Cadenza ===
The pandemic-induced lockdown had Festember ’20 whip up a brand new online entertainment series - Cadenza, to add to the Guest Lectures.

The series that welcomes the most sought-after virtuosos from around the world, was inaugurated with a soul-stirring performance by Shakthisree Gopalan (popular vocalist, songwriter and performer).

The impressive line-up of Cadenza's very first edition included Varun Sunil (founder and percussionist of the popular band Masala Coffee), Sanjeeta Bhattacharya (singer-songwriter, a graduate of the Berklee College of Music), Joey Delvaro aka "The Dutch Cookie" (DJ/producer, graduate from the Dutch Pop Academy in Utrecht, Netherlands), Maalavika Sundar (Carnatic singer and leading playback vocalist), Harini “Rini” Raghavan (New York-based, Chennai-born singer, graduated from Berklee College of Music) and L. V. Revanth (a leading playback singer in South India).

=== Ad Meliora ===
Festember’20 marked the inception of yet another interview series - Ad Meliora (derived from the Latin phrase meaning “towards better things”). The series hosts an eclectic mix of gifted personalities from around the world and gives its audience an opportunity to hear firsthand about their aspirations, inspirations and life experiences.

Ad Meliora kickstarted its first edition with an interview of Harun Robert a.k.a. Rob, known best for his tremendously popular craft show M.A.D on POGO. Festember kept up the hype and delivered on it every weekend throughout the series by hosting the likes of Jaaved Jaaferi (Veteran Bollywood actor and comedian), Sanjana Ganesan (Miss India finalist and sports reporter who hosted the 2019 Cricket World Cup), DJ Shaan (popular DJ, dubbing artist, talent show host and singer-songwriter), Nikhita Gandhi (leading Bollywood playback singer and songwriter), Haricharan (a much sought-after playback singer and vocalist), Ehsaan Noorani of the popular musical trio Shankar–Ehsaan–Loy (a veteran music composer and guitarist) and Ganesh Venkatraman (model, actor and reality TV star)

== ProShows ==
ProShows are a series of live performances held during Festember, with one show scheduled on each of the festival's four days. The performances have featured musicians and artists such as Amit Trivedi, Sachin–Jigar, Guns n Hoses, Ambi Subramaniam, Karthick Iyer, Motherjane and Euphoria.

The history of ProShows at Festember dates back decades, with prominent early ProShows featuring playback singer Unni Menon in 2002, rock band Thermal and a Quarter in 2003 etc. In 2004, back to back performances by Euphoria and Motherjane, then respectively India's leading Hindi and English rock bands, established ProShows as a mainstay of Festember. ProShows remain the most awaited part of Festember every year.

Attendees of Festember 2015 witnessed a great number of ProShow artists, starting with actress and classical dancer Rukmini Vijayakumar. DJs Kash Trivedi and Belgian duo Alvar and Millas performed the next night, and Day 2 saw rock bands Mushroom Lake, Black Letters, Skrat, and a surprise appearance from Shakthisree Gopalan who performed a song with Skrat. The final ProShow of Festember ‘15 saw the Golden Jubilee Convention Centre filled to capacity as popular Bollywood artists including Pritam Chakraborty, music director of Yeh Jawaani Hai Deewani, Abhijeet Sawant and Antara Mitra of Indian Idol fame, and singers Nakash Aziz and Aditi Singh Sharma take over the audience.

Festember 2016 played host to an international cover band, the 'Guns and Hoses' for the very first time. This was the first international rock band to have visited Trichy. The audience was also enthralled by well known romantic numbers by the Bollywood duo, Sachin–Jigar. The inauguration was followed by a classical-fusion performance by Bindu and Ambi Subramaniam. Festember'16 also had an EDM Night with DJ Aceaxe from VH1 Supersonic performing in NIT Trichy.

In Festember 2017, Amit Trivedi and his band came down to NIT Trichy to perform for the attendees of Festember’17. Headlining the EDM Night was DJ Shaan. The Red Bull Tour Bus presented RJD and Thermal And A Quarter, two rock bands for the Rock Night. Mesmerizing and sensational tunes from the violinist Shravan Sridhar took everyone's breath away.

In its 44th iteration in 2018, Festember staged some of the most talented artists in the world. The band Pineapple Express launched the nights of ProShows. The bands Skrat and Switcheroo kicked off the Rock Night on Day 1, which was set at pace by DJ Sabrina Terence on Day 2. With the opening act by Ravator, Festember witnessed one of its biggest DJ events ever. Sunidhi Chauhan stole the night of Day 3 with her impelling performance, and the hall resonated with her powerful voice.

Festember’19 set the ball rolling with Fusion Nite by bringing in the poster boy of Indian Classical Fusion music - Karthick Iyer, accompanied by his classic-contemporary band, IndoSoul. All stops were pulled out this time around with Rock Night this time around, and NITT's music-lovers were treated to an enthralling performance by Masala Coffee followed by the electrifying beats of WACX, who cranked the tempo up a notch. EDM Night was headlined by popular electronic music duo Progressive Brothers. Festember’19 signed off on a high note with celebrated Bollywood playback singer Benny Dayal. Dayal had the crowd swaying to his tunes from the moment he got hold of the mic and kept up the brio all throughout the performance.

Festember ’20 kept audiences entertained during the pandemic with a series of pro‑shows. Rajhesh Vaidhya.started the event, with Fusion Night then Naveen Richard performed stand‑up comedy. Vijay Yesudas sang soulfully on Icon Night and Shilpa Rao kept viewers entertained during Popular Night finishing the lineup.

Festember ‘20 had one last trick up its sleeve, concluding the 46h edition with “Finale”, where Stephen Devassy engaged the crowd with his electrifying music and Malavika ‘Mali’ Manoj followed the next day with her compelling performance.

== Events ==
As the titular purpose of any cultural festival, Festember offers a wide-ranging variety of events each year, one upping the events from the previous years. Innovative events continue to be launched each year, while the standard run-of-the-mill events also thrive under the wings of Festember. There are multiple categories in these events and are as follows.

=== Cultural events ===
Festember's cultural events are the major headlining events of the fest. Split into various categories, these events continue to be the star attraction for the multitude of participants that come down for the fest. The events include.

==== Dance ====
===== ChoreoNite =====
ChoreoNite is the flagship event of Festember. ChoreoNite gives college dance teams a stage to show their talent and creativity.

ChoreoNite has a format that invites many dance styles and musical genres. This draws crowds because the shows blend skill, expression and originality.

==== Music ====
===== Shruthilaya =====
Shruthilaya is a classical music competition for vocals and instrumentals. The stage has heard innumerable high-level musical masterpieces in the past. Participation is highly selective with limited entries allowed to take part. The uniqueness of Shruthilaya lies in its Carnatic Quiz, which represents a touch of the avant-garde.

===== Tarangini =====
Tarangini, the singing competition of Festember, regularly attracts droves of budding artists, who bring the audience to life with their peppy, feet-tapping playlists of Tamil and Hindi songs.

Fashion

==== Fashionitas ====
The pioneering Fashion Event of Trichy City. 'Fashionitas' was introduced in the 2012 edition of Festember as an Individual Event, offering the highest Cash Prize for an individual Event in Festember. It has since grown on to become a team event, with various fashion teams from all over the country gathering to showcase their own designs on their models.

Another event called Mr and Ms Festember also started for individuals to showcase their personality, ramp walk and talents, similar to the format of a beauty pageant.

==== Picturesque ====
As an online event, Picturesque targets the participants ability to work around a camera, the lighting and modelling itself as an art in the digital space. With lucrative cash awards, it continues to be one of the most participated in events of Festember.

==== Cinematography ====
===== Take-One =====
Take-One is the short-movie making competition of Festember. Movies with any theme or genre are permitted, with a duration of up to ten minutes. With eminent judges from the movie industry and themes ranging from fantasy to social messages, Take-One remains the viewer's delight.

==== Dramatics ====
===== Theatrix =====
Every year, the Thespians' society of NIT-Trichy organize "Theatrix", a 45-minute dramatics competition. Original scripts, pre-written scripts and adaptations are permitted, however, the play should not have been staged at any earlier Festember festival. With major participation from all the big colleges, audiences witness some chilling performances in front of the spotlight.

=== Dominoes ===
Teams have to arrange their dominoes within a one-metre square area marked on the floor. At the end of the competition, no domino is allowed to cross the perimeter and the most impressive arrangement wins the prize.

==== Chisel The Climax ====
A story is given to each team. Based on this description, the participants need to sketch the ending to the story prompt given. Judging is based on how interesting the painting turns out to be, how much it fits to the given prompt, and also on their artistic skill.

==== Graffiti ====
Graffiti painting competition, where the topic will be given on the spot and all necessary materials will be provided. Judging is based on degree of adherence to the theme, creativity, style, usage of the space provided and artistic quality.

=== Literary Events ===
Around 40 literary events take place each year in the Tamil, English and Hindi Lits categories. These events generally witness the most number of participants who battle it out to win with their quick-wittedness.

==== English Lits ====
Around thirteen literary events, based on the English language are conducted each year. They include regularly known events like quizzes, debates, Just A Minute speech, Dumb Charades etc., Crossword etc., while also hosting new and innovative versions of the same, like themed Quiz events or What's The Good Word, a contest based around vocabulary, pattern matching and speed.

==== Tamil Lits ====
Fourteen literary events consisting of crowd-favourites like Kalakkal Galatta, Sakalakala Attam, Uyarthini Semmozhi, etc. bring out the importance and pride of the Tamil language. A new online event called Tamil Labyrinth was also recently introduced. DG Vaishnav, Kumaraguru, MEPCO, JJCET, Sastra, SRM and EBET have regularly topped these events in the past.

==== Hindi Lits ====
Rochak Mantrana, Vaad Vivaad, Antakshari, De Dana Dan, Halka Fulka and Taatkalik Bhashan are just a few of the thirteen-odd Hindi literary events conducted. IITM, VIT and SRM have been proven to be the best to date.

== Workshops ==
At Festember workshops let students explore interests and learn something different. Each year workshops offer five or six sessions, where students can try activities from Fencing to Glassblowing. A workshop lasts a few hours so it is easy to learn a new skill and also join other festival events. The wide range of workshop topics guarantees that there is always something to look forward to.

2008	2009	2010	2011	2012	2013	2014	2015	2016	2017	2018	2019	2020
Photography	Archery	Photography	Break Dance Solo	Beat Boxing	Hip hop	Screenplay Writing	DJ	Kendo	Handwriting Analysis	The Melting Words	Visual Effects	Perspective Drawing
Crossword Solving	Cartooning	Ventriloquism	Fencing	Skateboarding	Tango	Pyrography	Caricature	Mocktail Making	Aikido	Glass Blowing	Wildlife Photography	Art Direction
Creative Writing	Independent Film-Making	Photo Gene	Flair Bartending	Popping	Archery	Pottery	Sound Design	Graffiti	Magic	Capoeira	Freestyle Football	Chess
Western Dance	Hypnotism	Dance	Jive	Salsa	Glassblowing	Latin Fusion Salsa	Crime Scene Investigation	Mind Reading	One Stroke Art	Parkour	Charcoal Drawing	Magic and Mentalism
Overall Styling	Dance	DJ	Illusions	Frisbee	Photography	Parkour	Lyrical Hip Hop	Slacklining	Nunchaku	Standup Comedy	Pointillism	Pen Mandala
	Theatrics				Magic	Rifle Shooting	Freestyle Football	Card Throwing	Hypnotism	Boomerang	Fencing	
						Mini Golf	Salsa	Beatboxing	Solo Dance	Ventriloquism	Electronic Dance Music	
						Old School Hip Hop	Ventriloquism	Theatrics	Clay Modelling	Paint Pouring	Beatboxing	
						Bassed on Rhythm	Fencing	Roller Skating	Couple Dance	Cardistry	Locking	
								Boxing	Light Painting	Lyrical hip-hop	Argentine Tango	
								Hip hop	Yoyo	Salsa	Micro Art	
								Tango	Juggling			

== Outreach Events ==
In an attempt to spread the name of Festember far and wide across the nation and increase its reach, Festember conducts several themed outreach events in collaboration with several corporations and locations, to provide a platform to those deserving of it. Some of these events include.

=== Rolling Reels International Film Festival ===
Rolling Reels International Film Festival is an integral part of Festember. Started in the year 2015, receiving international stature in 2020 as one of the outreaches of Festember, RRIFF is a short film festival that looks to find young talent from the many film makes in India- a platform for young film industry aspirers to make their presence known. It is a two-day cinematic extravaganza with several workshops sure to enthrall young film makers and actors who will get to interact with experts in the industry which is sure to help them hone their skills and talents.

RRFF 2015, the first edition, was held in Hyderabad at Kollywood actor's Nagarjuna's studio Annapoorna Film Studios, attended by directors Balaji Mohan, Madhumitha and many others. The presence of actress Amala Akkineni made the fest more memorable. This edition of RRFF also had the association with Thoongavanam, a film starring Kamal Haasan.

RRFF 2016, held in Chennai at BOFTA was an even bigger success. With over 250 entries from across the globe, the movies were judged by the late Biren Das Sharma, Professor, Satyajit Ray Film and Television Institute, Kolkata. This edition had an art direction workshop conducted by T.Ramalingam of Kabali fame and a guest lecture by actor and director Prathap Pothen.

RRFF 2018 took place in Chennai and was judged by Ashwin Saravanan and the veteran directors N. Lingusamy and Mohan Raja.

RRIFF 2020 introduced a new international category for films, with films from over 20 countries, being judged by Oscar-nominated Tomm Moore. The panel discussion on OTT vs traditional film platforms also received high acclaim due to the names associated with KC Anand, Anthony Gonsalez, Arun Chidambaram and Dilip Kumar, along with Nikki Galrani organising an enthralling live show.

=== Gigahertz ===
Gigahertz is semi professional rock band at Festember. Its preliminary rounds take place in Chennai and Bangalore every year.

=== Festember Football League ===
Festember Football League is a new addition to the outreach events, having started only in 2017. It sets an arena for quick-paced five-a-side matches with rolling subs, set up in a knockout tournament style. It takes place in Bangalore and Chennai.

== Festember Social Responsibility ==
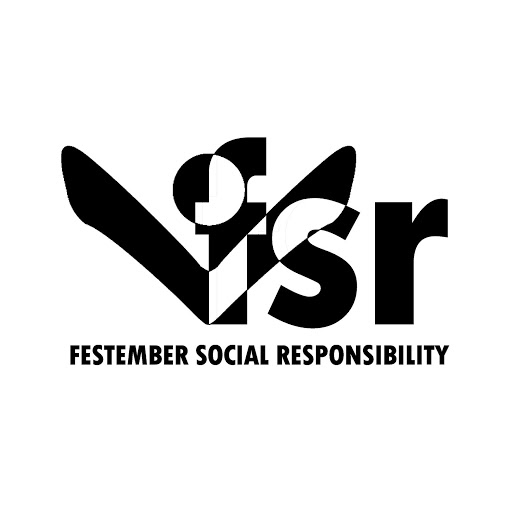
FSR Logo

Festember Social Responsibility (FSR) is the social responsibility wing of Festember. Since its inception in 2012, FSR has embarked upon various endeavours to benefit the masses through many events known for their creative names. Due to the efforts of a group of hardworking and inspired students, FSR has managed to go beyond the college boundaries to various orphanages, schools, and cities. The flagship initiatives of FSR are:

=== Gold Dustbin ===
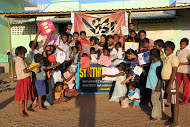
The FSR team at Synthika Trust

The Gold Dustbin event, usually held at the end of the academic year, is the first event in the FSR calendar. Student volunteers collect items from hostels on campus, and after thorough segregation, these items are sold. The money acquired by selling these items is used to organize the ‘Gift a Birthday’ event at the Synthika Trust in Lalgudi, Trichy. In 2015, the money generated from this event was used to set up a library in the REC Middle School in an event called 'Pages'.

=== Pages ===
Pages was social responsibility outreach conducted by Festember in Chettinad Vidyashram School on 2 September 2016 in association with the NGO Teach for India and popular children's magazine Tinkle. Pages is primarily a book collection drive where school students, teachers contribute books which would go as proceeds to Teach for India to educate children in rural India. The event was launched with the sub-editor of Tinkle, Sean D'Mello, as the chief guest who later conducted a small workshop with the school students focusing on story writing.

For the 2019 edition of Pages, which took place on the 12th of September, students of Star School at Karur donated over 2200 books that helped us set libraries in North Gandhigramam School at Karur and St. Joseph School at Ayyampatti. Apart from that, a quiz competition and a Poster designing competition were conducted on themes of sustainable development for the students of classes 4-5 and 6-8 respectively.

=== Young Astronomer Talent Search ===
A small step towards this was the Young Astronomers Talent Search organized by Festember Social Responsibility at St Johns Vestry Anglo Indian High School in association with Tata Steel and Space Kids. A diverse array of events such as model exhibits, essay writing, word games, role play and debate were conducted. Students set up astronomy models centred on the work done by ISRO for the exhibits. Each contest had two categories for students of standard 6 to 8 and standard 8 to 10. An initiative to promote awareness of astronomy among students and tribute A.P.J. Abdul Kalam's an indisputable contribution to the field.

=== Cancer Awareness Month ===
Festember took up several initiatives to spread awareness about cancer and to raise funds for cancer victims. A breast cancer awareness session was conducted on the campus by specialists from Harshamitra Super Specialty Cancer Centre in Trichy. Festember also joined the No Shave November moment, where volunteers were asked to give up shaving for a month and donate the amount typically spent for that purpose. The amount collected was a big sum of Rs 20,000, and it was collected from over 1,000 participants. The money collected was donated to the Indian Prostate Cancer Foundation, an organisation dedicated to raising awareness of Prostate cancer in men. The money was then used to conduct a screening session for Armed Force veterans.

=== Paperback ===
The Paperback initiative of FSR aims at reducing paper wastage. This event involved students actively volunteering to give their unused exam answer sheets, which would otherwise go waste. The collected sheets were reused in various Festember events. Also, the team didn't restrict themselves to the fest and took a step forward to serve society. Booklets were made from the remaining sheets and distributed to Illuminate; a government certified charitable trust that aims at developing the lives of the children of the marginalized communities. This Paperback initiative is unique and a true realization of FSR's goal to create ripples of change throughout the year and for the years to come.

=== Peace Rally ===
The "Walk For Peace" event conceived with the idea of taking the message "Individual peace contributes to world peace" was organized by Heartfulness Meditation Organization (USA). The event started with HFN relaxation to the participants and followed up with a rally through the artery of the city with high visibility. With support from the corporation of Tiruchirappalli, the event was a grand success with over 600 participants.

=== Play ===
With the idea of reviving the lost art form of Street Play or "Therukoothu", Festember Social Responsibility visited two schools in Tiruchirapalli – Kamakoti Vidyalaya and Bishop Heber Higher secondary school during the week before Festember. In true "therukoothu" style, the team brought out the importance of physical activity for children of the current generation, complete with meaningful songs, relatable characters, and humorous wordplay.

=== Metrole ===
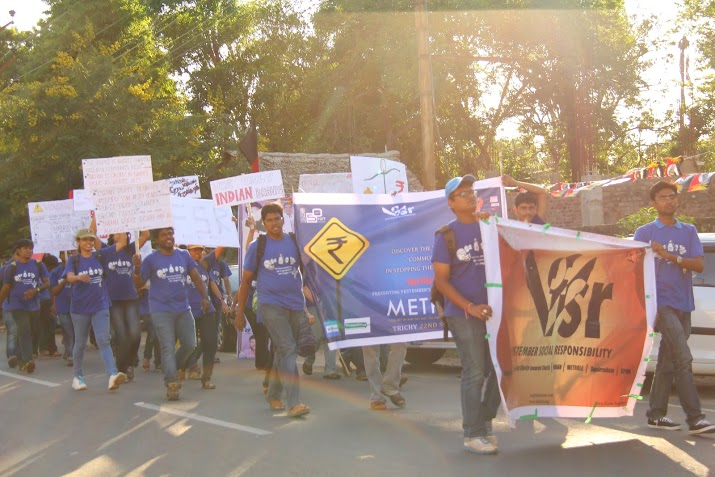
The FSR team during the Metrole rally in Trichy

In 2013, in an attempt to increase awareness about social issues in the area of a large audience, the FSR team headed to Trichy and commenced Metrole. They marched on the streets of Trichy and conducted a rally to educate the masses about the depreciation of the Indian rupee, and what the common man could do to alleviate the problem. During the course of the rally, impromptu street plays were held, focusing on related issues like Brain drain, Gold Trade, buying foreign products against indigenous products, etc.

=== Early Ember ===
For the 2019 edition of Festember, the FSR team visited the nearby REC Middle School and St. Joseph's School Ayyampatti to spend a fun-filled day with the students. The students were taught beatboxing through workshops, played games and conducted a talent show. The motive was to inculcate an idea of Festember and its fun in the kids. It provided a delightful start for Festember 2019.

=== Aashi ===
Aashi is a social drive conducted by the Festember Social Responsibility Team to promote awareness about the daily routines of people who are disabled. In its first edition in 2017, 50 volunteers brought smiles and laugh to the gifted students at Vidivelli Special School in Trichy during the Autistic awareness month of April. The second edition of Aashi invited volunteers to spend a morning with the strong-willed women at the rehabilitation centre for blind women, Mannapuram, Trichy. The drive succeeded in instilling the courage to face challenges in all the participants.

=== Channelled Clarity towards Charity ===
Channelled Clarity towards Charity is an inter-school event conducted each year at various schools in different cities by the Festember Social Responsibility Team. In 2017 the event was held at SBOA, Chennai and in 2018 it was hosted by the Akara World School. The competitions range from literary events to poster making and many more. A nominal registration fee is collected from each participant and the accumulated amount is directed to charities to help the blind, handicapped and people in all walks of life. This drive brings together a variety of students and gives them a platform to compete and challenge as well as nurture their social calling.

In the 2020 edition of CCC, students from participating schools took part in seven activities, and the proceeds collected were donated to CRY (Child Rights and You), which works towards providing education to the underprivileged. This drive brings together a variety of students and gives them a platform to compete and challenge as well as nurture their social calling.

=== Earth Hour ===
On 30 March 2019, the Festember Social Responsibility Team organised a drive to rekindle connections with the Earth. An enumerate number of people, ranging from students to professors joined the event. They were allowed to walk through moon-lit paths while all their gadgets were turned off. The ground was made bright by the glow of the wristbands that were provided to all the participants. A star-gazing session was also organised at the NSO ground of NIT Trichy towards the end.

== Sponsors ==
Festember was initially conducted on a shoestring budget. Over time, the event's reputation has strengthened substantially and various corporate sponsors including Adobe, Nimbuzz and Aircel have contributed funding.

Major corporate sponsorship in Festember includes (but is not limited to) the following sponsors:

- 2007: Airtel ( Main sponsor), Indian Oil (Co-sponsor), Nvidia, Nestle (Associate sponsors)
- 2008: Airtel (Title Sponsor)
- 2009: Vodafone (Main Sponsor)
- 2011: DHL, Triton Musicz, Canara Bank, Peta, Vasan Eye Care, SS Music
- 2012: Nimbuzz, Cadbury 5 Star, Aircel, Coca-Cola, Asus, Canara Bank, Appy Fizz
- 2013: Adobe (Title sponsor), Hero, Nimbuzz, Celkon mobiles
- 2015: Paragon (Title Sponsor), The Times of India, Luvit, Coca-Cola
- 2016: City Union Bank (Title Sponsor), Coke Studio (India), MAK Lubricants
- 2017: OnePlus (Title sponsor), Maruti Suzuki
- 2018: British Council (Title sponsor), City Union Bank
- 2019: JioSaavn, City Union Bank
- 2020: CelebritySchool, LensFit, Fever 104 FM, Radio One (India), Film Companion, DHL

== See also ==
- National Institute of Technology Tiruchirappalli
- DoMS NIT Trichy
- List of culfests in India
