= John P. Varkey =

Indian guitarist, songwriter, and composer (c.1970–2022)

John P. Varkey ജോണ്‍ പി വർക്കി
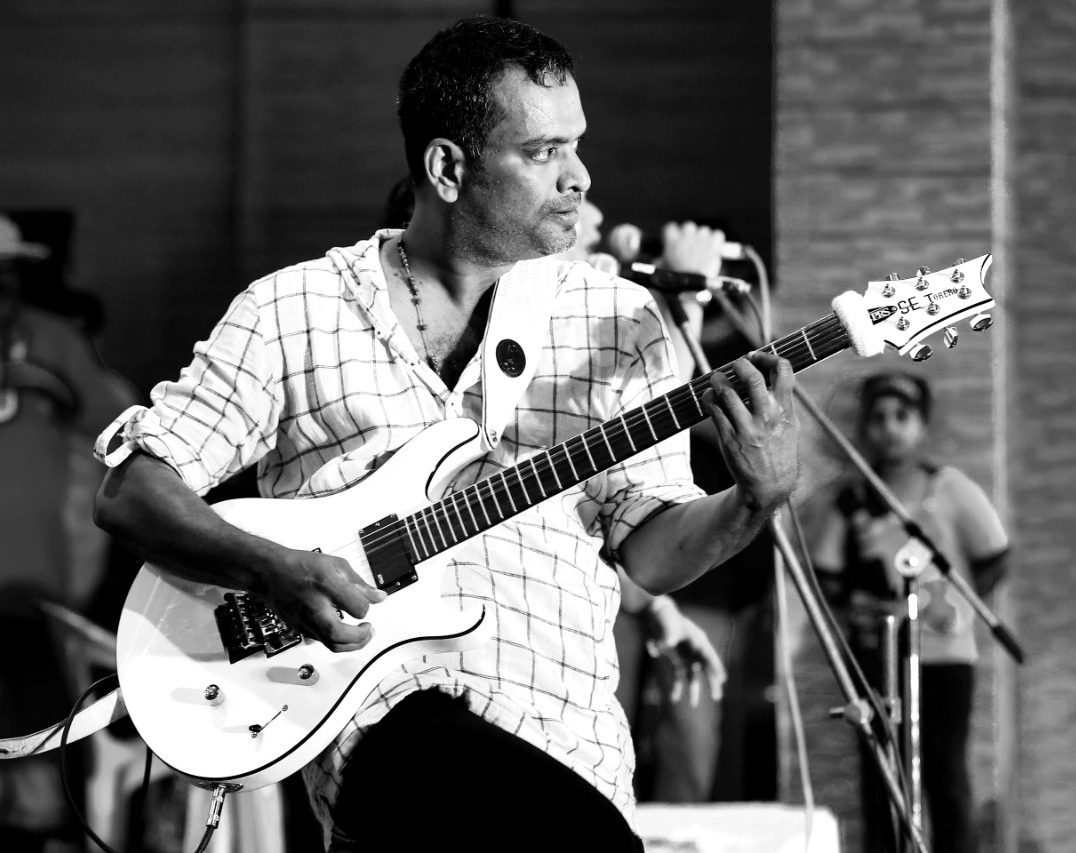

Background information
- Born: c. 1970; Thrissur, Kerala, India
- Died: 29 August 2022 (aged 52) Thrissur
- Genre: Rock
- Occupations: Rock guitarist, songwriter, composer
- Instrument: Guitar
- Years active: c. 1995–2022
- Formerly of: Avial; Jigsaw Puzzle; Slowpedalers
- Spouse: Baby

John P. Varkey (c. 1970 – 29 August 2022) was an Indian guitarist, songwriter and composer. He began his career as a session guitarist.

== Career ==
He brought out three albums with Jigsaw Puzzle by the label BMG Crescendo which were innovative and well accepted by the new generation and led to the formation of band Avial. John discontinued from Avial and independently directed music for many Indian big time feature films with prominent productions and directors. His ideas and innovative sound textures made many films come to life. Varkey first came to prominence as a member of the Malayalam rock band Avial, which itself evolved out of a band called Jigsaw Puzzle. Varkey was the guitarist and songwriter for the Thrissur-based band, Slowpedalers. He started his career as a composer in the film industry through the film Frozen.

== Education ==
- John studied pre-degree, degree, and master's in economics from 1985 to 1992 at St. Aloysius College, Thrissur
- Varkey studied music at the Trinity College of Music in London. He completed 8th grade in classical guitar.

== Family ==
John married Baby, who is working as a teacher. They have two children, Job John and Joseph.

== Filmography ==
- 2007- Frozen (Hindi/Ladaki, background score)
- 2008- Idi Sangathi (Telugu, three songs)
- 2011- Karthik (Kannada, five songs)
- 2012- Unnam (Malayalam, four songs and background score)
- 2012- I.D. (Background score)
- 2013- Olipporu (Eight songs)
- 2016- Kammatipaadam
- 2017- Penkody (Background score)
- 2018- Eeda (Travel Song Mizhi Niranju & played guitar for background score)

== Awards and honours ==
- Jury of the 8TH MADRID IMAGINE INDIA FILM FESTIVAL selected Frozen (2007 film) which he did in 2007, for the best music.

== Prominent works ==
- 1991-1997 toured with various LIVE rock bands and participated in prominent festival including Indian Institute of Technology Delhi " rendezvous "
- 1997-2000 founded Malayalam rock band JIGSAWPUZZLE (the first Mallu band to come in to view in MTV)
- composed, arranged and produced vibrant songs like NADA NADA, THEEKANAL, FLOW etc. became internationally hits.
- 2000-MAY music composed and performed with Daksha Sheth, IIsha Sharvani in Asia and in Helsinki music and dance festival held in Finland
- 2000-2001 music composed for Malayalam feature film Neythukaran directed by Priyanandanan
- 2002-2003 composed and arranged music for Malayalam rock band Avial
- 2004-2005 music composed and arranged for film Punhm directed by Gangamukhi Film and Television Institute of India and K Rajesh.
- 2004-2005 composed and arranged music for film Vadhakramam directed by Kamal K. M.
- 2005 sound design and co produced music for fusion band Karnatrix
- 2006 music composed for film Kshitij directed by Binthesh Paruri FTII
- 2006 music composed for experimental film KA directed by Amit Dutta
- 2007 composed music for film Theerangal directed by Sanju Surendran
- 2007 music composed and arranged for feature film Frozen (bagged best music award from 8th MADRID IMAGINE INDIA FILM FESTIVAL) directed by Shivaji Chandrabushan
- 2008 music composed and arranged for docufiction Cradle of Christianity directed by Jain Joseph FTII
- 2008 composed music for Telugu feature film Idi Sangathi (TABU AND ABBAS in lead role) directed by Chandru Siddharth. Three songs became superhits
- 2008 composed and arranged music for film When the man dies directed by Arun Sukumar FTII
- 2009 sound designed and music for International Film Festival of Kerala 2000 Signature Film
- 2010 music composed and supervised music production of Kannada feature film Karthik
- 2011 music composed and arranged for docu fiction JEWS IN KERALA directed by Sajive Pillai
- 2012 music composed and supervised music production for Sibimalayil film Unnam (ASIF ALI, RIMA KALLINGAL, NEDUMUDI, LAL)
- 2012 music for Hindi movie ID directed by K.M. Kamal got several international awards
- 2013 music and its production supervision for Olipporu lead role Fahadh Faasil, Kalabhavan Mani
- 2013 supervised pre session Background score music production for movie Masala Republic
- 2014 video, audio album with Fr Bobby Jose Kattikkad and Prof. V.G Thampi
- 2014 October 22 A musical concert for the Homage to the children of Gaza in Thrissur Regional outdoor theater
- 2015 performed in Kappa TV Music Mojo, Pappaya Cafe Cochin.
- 2015 live performance with Leaves of Grace, a music movement constituted by Sasikumar V, Anvar Ali, and Mustafa Desamangalam, which featured poets and contemporary musicians.
- 2015 Composed music for Rajeev Ravi's film Kammatipaadam.
- 2017 Live performance with Slow peddlers at Pepper House (Alt and Pepper)
- 2017 Live performance with Voters at Quilon Ashram conducted by 8 point Art cafe and DTPC as part of Onam celebrations
