= Avial (band) =

Indian alternative rock band

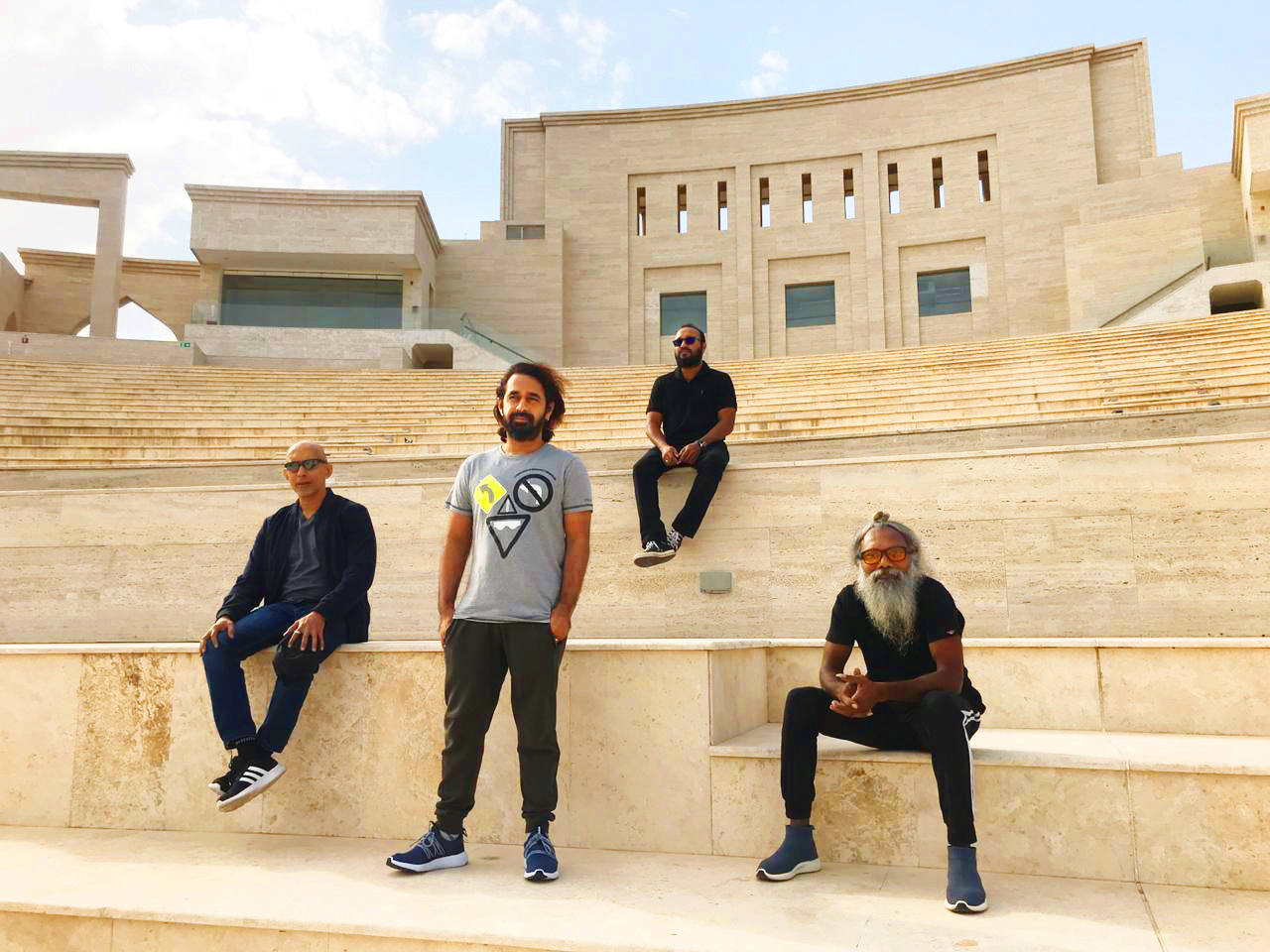
- Avial getting ready to perform at Amphitheatre Katara Cultural Village, Doha (Qatar) in 2020

Background information
- Origin: Thiruvananthapuram, Kerala, India
- Genre: Alternative rock
- Years active: 2003–present
- Members: Tony John; Rex Vijayan; Mithun Puthanveetil; Binny Isaac
- Past members: Anandraj Benjamin Paul; Naresh Kamath; John P. Varkey; C.I. Joffy

Avial are an Indian alternative rock band formed in Thiruvananthapuram, Kerala, India in 2003, and known for their Malayalam lyrics. The band initially included lead vocalist Anandraj Benjamin Paul, guitarist Rex Vijayan, turntablist and backing vocalist Tony John, bassist Naresh Kamath and drummer Mithun Puthanveetil. Avial had their first breakthrough with the 2003 single "Nada Nada". They are known for pioneering what they call "Alternative Malayali rock", which is the style of combining Malayalam lyrics and rock music. Their eponymous album got them six out of seven Jack Daniels Rock Awards and Footprints Young Achiever's Award in 2008. The band was praised for achieving mainstream success despite singing in their native language.

After the departure of Paul and Kamath in 2008, John took over the vocals. Later Binny Isaac joined as bassist. Their debut album covers social issues, consisting of folk songs and poems. In 2009, they collaborated with the Italian band A67 for the song "Chi Me Sape" ("Who Knows Me Knows It"). They composed the singles "Aana Kallan" and "Chillane" for the Malayalam films Salt N' Pepper (2011) and 22 Female Kottayam (2012). They also did three songs for the movie Second Show (2012)

== History ==
=== 2003–2008 ===
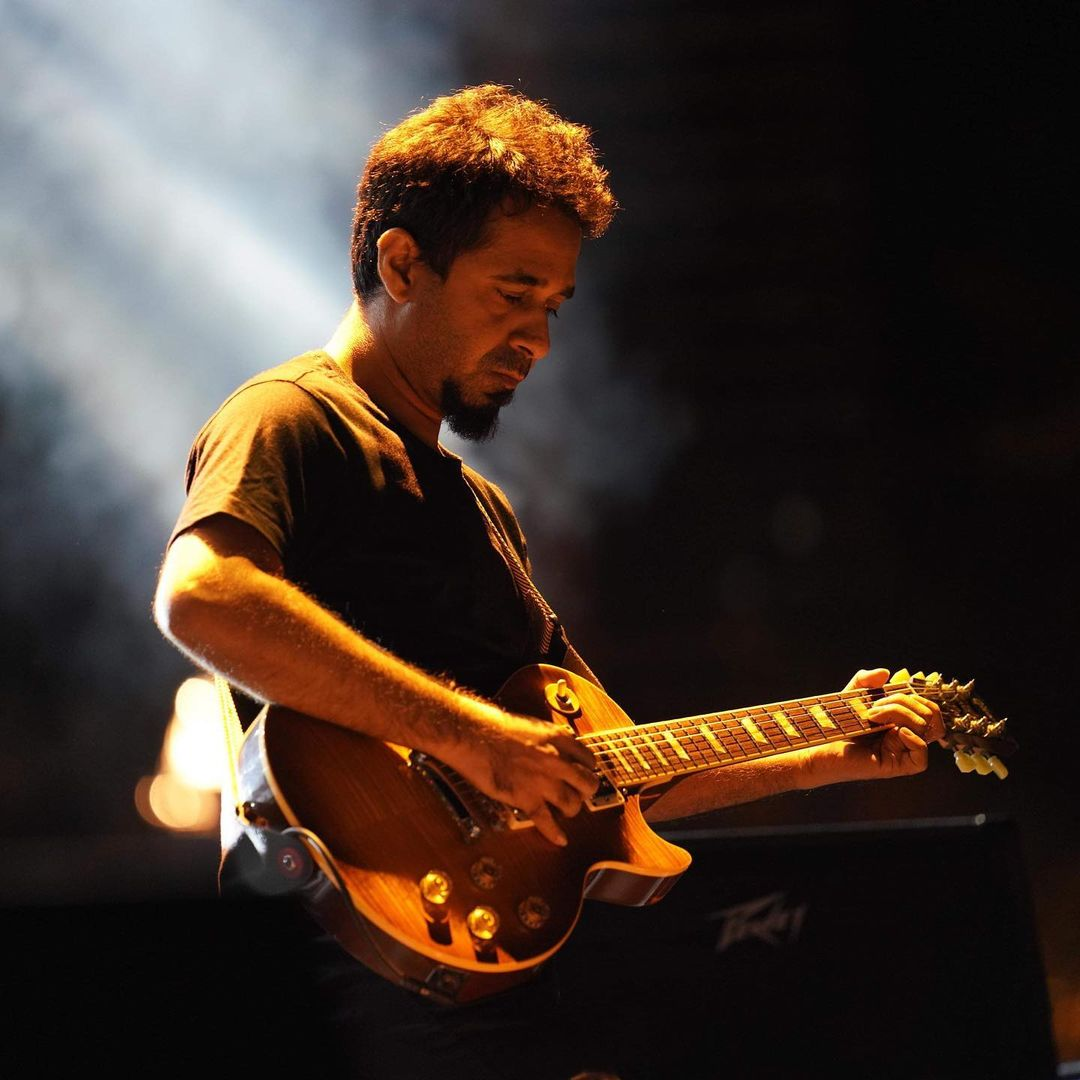
Rex Vijayan performing live in 2019

Rex Vijayan was the guitarist from the progressive rock band Motherjane in Kochi for five years. He met Tony John, then band-member of Jigsaw Puzzle, which also included Anandraj Benjamin Paul and John P. Varkey. Vijayan, Tony John and Naresh Kamath were, for a brief period, part of a dance-music troupe by Daksha Sheth Dance Company in Thiruvananthapuram. John showed Vijayan a version of the song "Nada Nada". He liked its Malayalam lyrics and they decided to perfect it. Avial was formed in 2003 with lead vocalist Anandraj Benjamin Paul, turntablist and backing vocalist Tony John, guitarist Rex Vijayan, bassist Naresh Kamath and drummer Mithun Puthanveetil. The band was named after the south Indian dish avial, which is traditionally part of Sadya, made with a mixture of various vegetables. Vijayan thought of the name with they representing a combination of various influences with their music, just like how avial is a dish blended with assorted ingredients, being the official explanation.

"Nada Nada" was originally written by Engandiyur Chandrashekaran and John P. Varkey. The band first composed it in English for an album which they did not promote commercially. John said, "Till then we used to play only English songs. Later when we realised that the big names of rock music drew inspiration from the songs of the soil, we turned to Malayalam lyrics." They practised in John's home studio in Palayam, Thiruvananthapuram with new instrumentation and its original Malayalam lyrics. Vijayan is from Kollam while Puthanveetil is Kannur-based. Film-maker Pradeep Kalipurayath, creative head at Poorman Productions helped them shoot the song video and they uploaded it to YouTube in addition to releasing it in SS Music in 2003. Unsure whether it would get good reception and about singing in Malayalam, they waited for a year to begin recording their debut album Avial. "Nada Nada" went viral on YouTube and was well received.

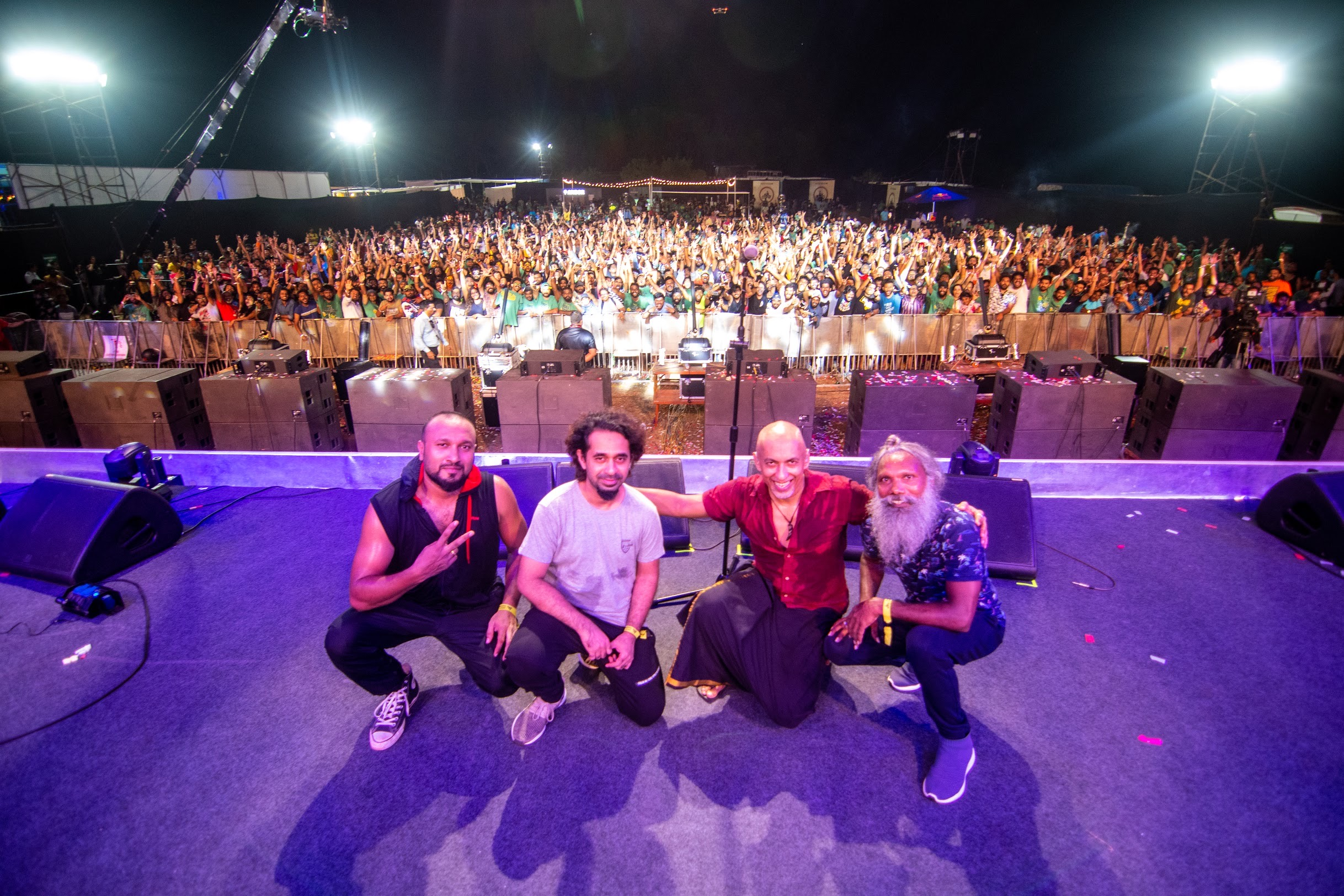
Avial after their Performance at Ridermania 2019 shot by Meghanadan.

The band spent a year finding a record label and Mumbai-based Naresh Kamath got them a deal with Phat Phish Records from the city. "Karukara" from Avial is a poem by Kavalam Narayana Panikkar from the Malayalam film Kummatti, while the rest of the songs were written by people known to them. They combined "Karukura" with heavy guitar riffs and bass lines. Sudhi Velamanoor wrote the songs "Aadu Pambe" and "Ettam pattu", in addition to contributions by lyricist P. B. Gireesh. Singer Aparnasree provided supporting vocals in two songs. A new version of "Nada Nada" was also in the album.

Avial was completed in 2008 and they launched it at Bandra Amphitheatre; MTV released their music video. Their first live show was in March 2008 at the East Wind festival in New Delhi. Prior to this, lead vocalist Anandraj Benjamin Paul migrated to the US with his wife, which led to John replacing him; bassist Naresh Kamath left because of being originally from the fusion band Kailasa with Binny Issac taking his place. The album sold over 45,000 copies, despite being entirely in Malayalam. They received six of the seven Jack Daniels Rock Awards in 2008 including song of the year, album of the year and band of the year in popular and critics' categories as well as the Footprints Young Achiever's Award. John said, "Language is really not an issue because the sound speaks for us. It is only the sound that matters."

=== 2009–present ===
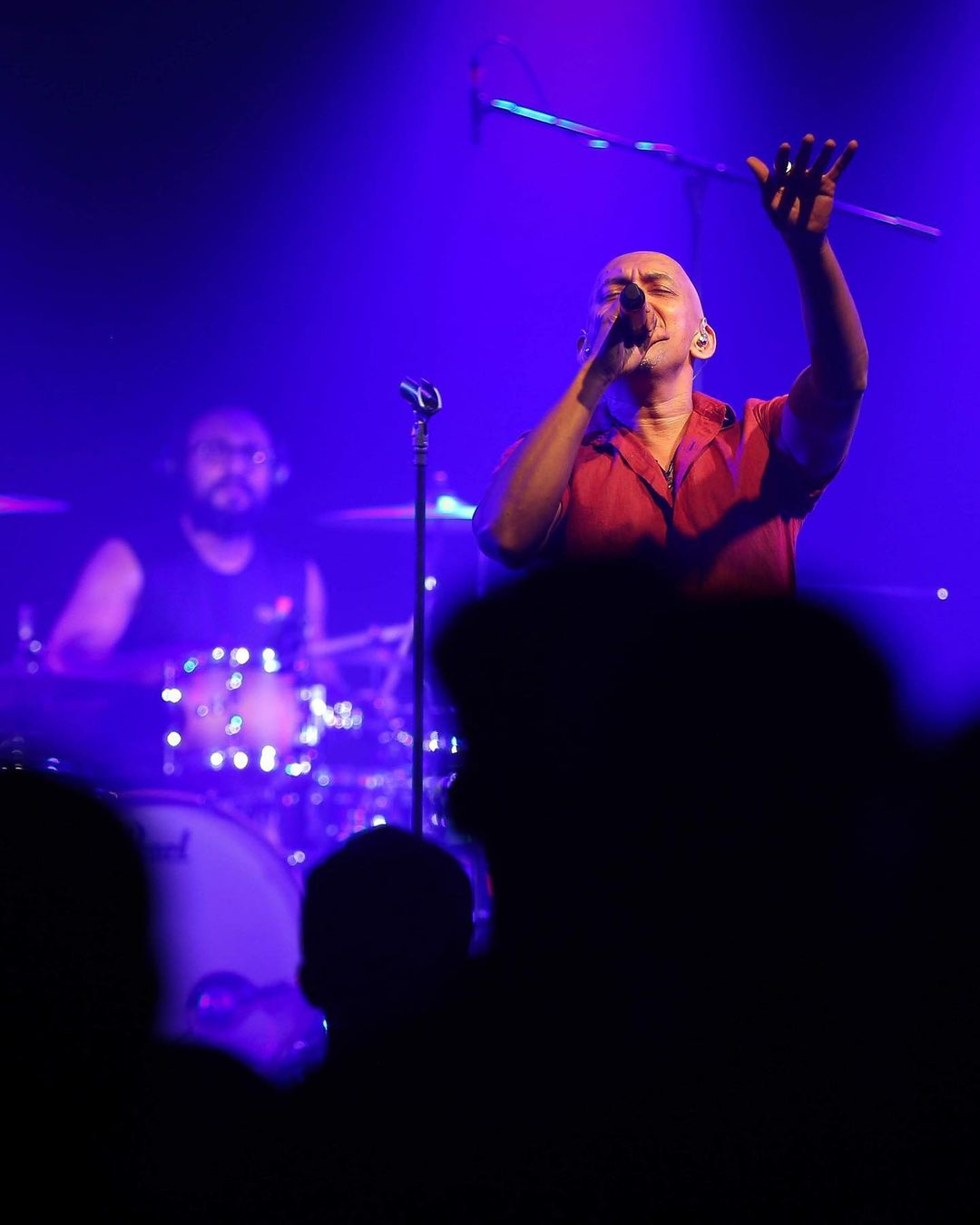
Tony John at Doha 2020

Avial performed live shows in cities across India as well as some internationally. They were the only Indian band chosen to perform at the Sakifo (Reunion Islands) World Music Festival held in Mauritius in 2008 with 40 other rock bands. Record label Phat Phish Records and Doordarshan were co-hosting a reality show for rock bands, along with the musician A.R. Rahman. Avial was invited to perform at their opening press meet. During the press meet, Rahman praised the band and their song "Nada Nada". The 2008 concert was primarily a fund-raiser for the victims affected by the Bihar floods. Farhan Akhtar, a director-actor in the Hindi film industry, organised the concert.

In 2009, an Italian five-piece act named A67 approached Avial through MySpace. This led to their one-song collaboration "Chi Me Sape" ("Who Knows Me Knows It"). Guitarist Vijayan used the sitar for this song. In 2010, they performed at Kyra Theatre, Bangalore. The band signed a deal with Converse shoes to promote their music. They have relied on YouTube and Myspace to promote their work. In 2010, Avial performed at the annual college fest "Zodiac" of the Rajiv Gandhi Institute of Technology, Mumbai and at Autumn Muse, the annual cultural festival of St. John's Medical College, Bangalore on 14 August 2010, opening with their new track "Ayyo!"; they also performed in Madras Christian College. In "Ayyo!", Vijayan plays the mandolin; they released its teaser in 2011.

Avial composed the song "Aana Kallan" in the 2011 Malayalam film Salt N' Pepper, launching it in the music club Blue Frog in South Mumbai. "Aana Kallan" is a folk song and its lyrics were modified by Saju Sreenivasan. John said about them actually performing it in the film, "We wanted to try something different. This song is more or less like a teaser for our second album. Whereas the first album was total rock, the second will be an avial (mix) of styles with more focus on melody." During an interview in 2011, regarding their second album, John said, "We have planned eight to 10 songs for the album and we're actually progressing at a good pace." The album will be their first one featuring him on lead vocals. In April 2012, Avial performed at the "Music, Arts and Dance" festival in Ooty. They composed a track titled "Chillane" ("Broken") for the 2012 film 22 Female Kottayam. In the same year, they released a music video of the song "SuprabathaKali" to mark the launch of The Times of India English newspaper in Kerala; they were chosen because of their fusion of "English rock" and Malayalam. In March 2014, they performed at the second edition of Indie March at Counter Culture, Bangalore along with two other bands; this was their third show there. In September 2014, they performed live at Festember at the National Institute of Technology, Tiruchirappalli.

== Musical style, image and themes ==
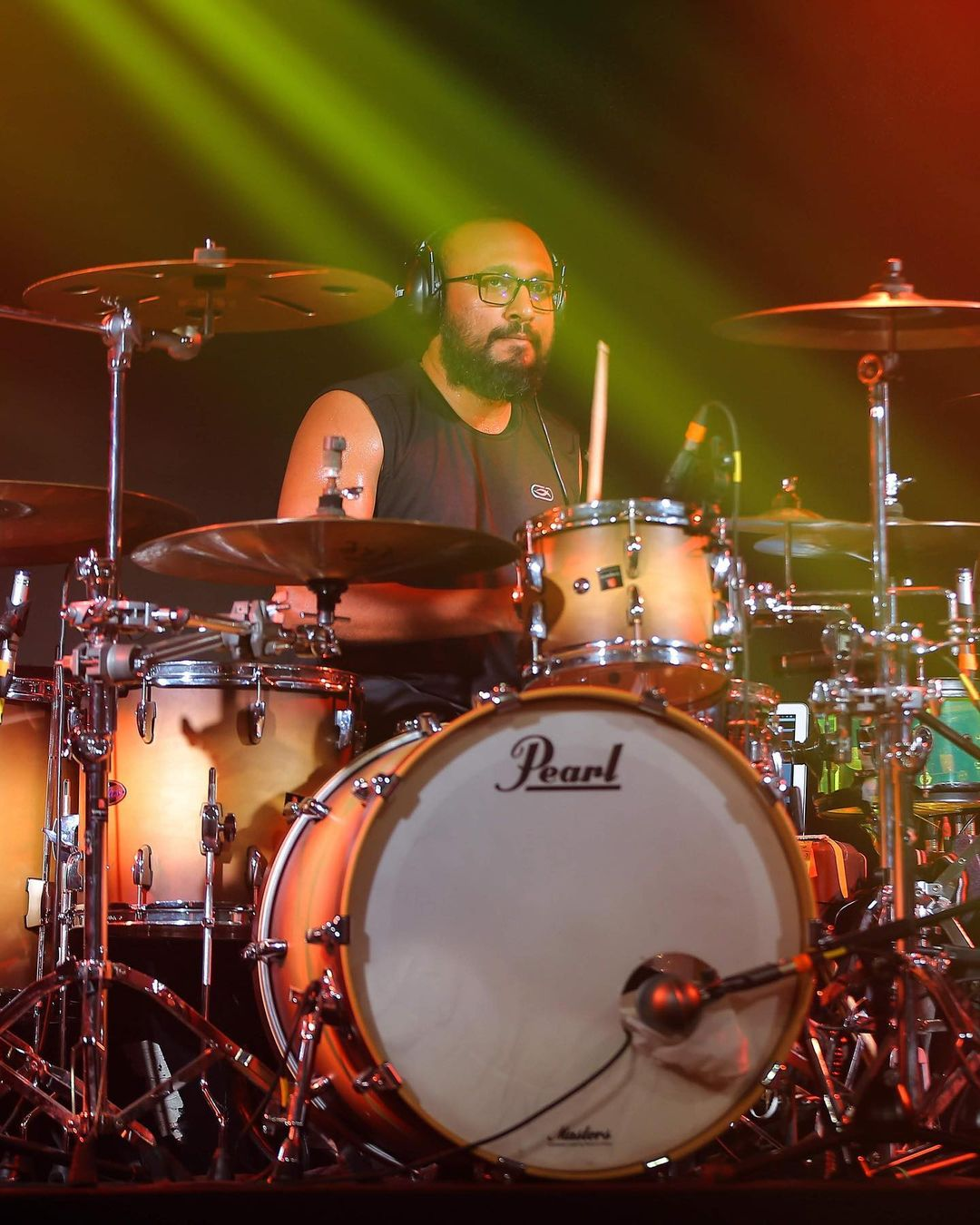
Mithun Puthenveetil Performing in Doha

The band refer to their style as "Alternative Malayali rock". John commented on their mixture of Malayalam lyrics and rock music, "This was a major challenge to us as that would not be liked by the younger generation when it came to the language and the old when it came to rock music." Vijayan said, "When we toured worldwide to audiences who knew no Malayalam but loved us, I realised that language wasn't what stopped Malayalam music from becoming mainstream, it was a matter of presenting it right." On alternative rock, Vijayan commented, "...Unlike glam rock, hard rock or heavy metal, it does not begin with an intro, followed by the song, the chorus, the guitar solo and the likes. Avial swears by the mantra of alternative rock which allows us the freedom to gel rustic Malayalam with funky rock." Their influences vary from classic rock band Led Zeppelin to alternative rock band Incubus. John said, "Over the years, we've been listening to everything from the 70s, 80s and 90s, and our music is a mix of everything we've ever heard. There are just too many influences to name."

John is known for performing on-stage in concerts dressed in a lungi which the other band members admit trying but found playing their instruments uncomfortable. The band covers a variety of themes. "Aadu Pambe" is about the culture of tribals and their exploitation, "Aranda" mourns the present condition of the world while "Chekele", "Karukara" and "Arikurukan" are folk songs. "Chekele" is about a farmer and his wife whose crops have been destroyed in a flood. Their single "Aana Kallan" is a modified version of a folk song, which is about the fraud swamis and liars, with elements of jazz, melody and funk—a lighter style compared to their first album.

== Influence ==
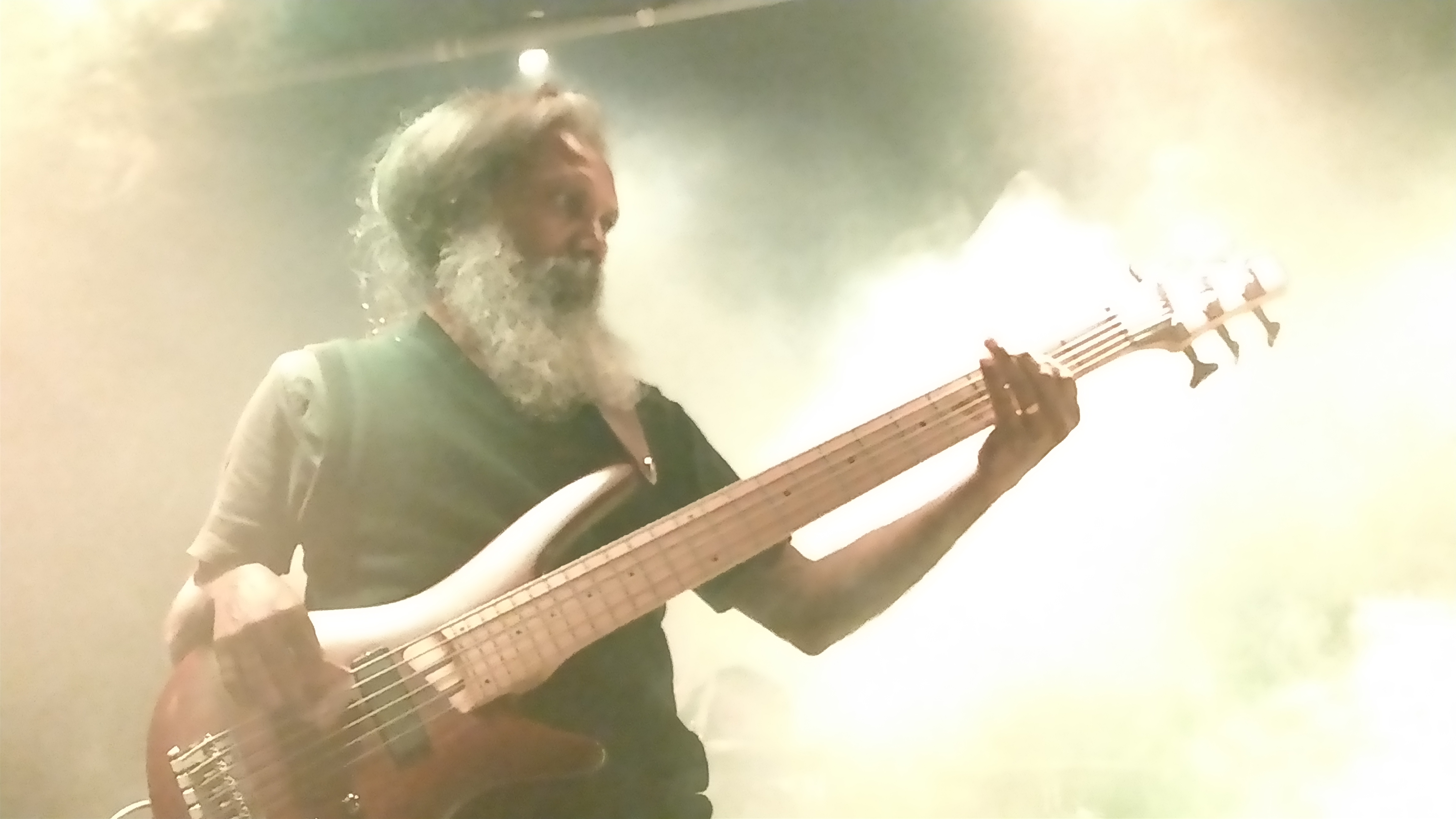
Binni Issac Performing during their show at the Xu, Leela Palace, Bangalore, after completing 10 years of Avial Band.

Rex Vijayan is endorsed by Gibson guitars among other guitarists from India. The band is known as the pioneers of their style of "alternative Malayalam rock". The Hindu said, "In singing in Malayalam, however, Avial proves more than anything else that language isn't really a barrier for good music." Their performance at Kyra Theatre, Bangalore was nominated in NH7.in's list "The Indiecision '10: Best Gig Indian" among four other bands saying, "On home-ish turf, the Mallu band's act becomes a colossal monster fuelled by the undying, unequivocal support of an adoring audience." The album Avial was also in their "Top 25 Albums of The 2000s", they commented, "It didn't matter that the songs had spent so many years in the cans – the band's sound, a brand of classic rock, garnished with elements of metal and electronica was fresh enough, but the vocals, sung in Malayalam further distinguished them from anything else around."

Kerala-based thrash metal band The Down Troddence cited Avial as their main influence and inspiration. Rolling Stone India praised John's on-stage attitude and traditional attire. They commented, "John would only speak in Malayalam wearing his identity with a cool arrogance, and the audience shared his pride." However, they noted his "vocal flaws" after Paul's departure as lead vocalist during their first performance at Blue Frog, South Mumbai in 2011. They further said that none of John's flaws are present in the album or in any studio recording. They summed up the band as, "[Avial] will always be the band that shunned all norms – they released an all-Malayalam album as their debut and turned to their roots for lyrical and musical inspiration."

== Band members ==
Current members

- Rex Vijayan – guitars, synthesiser (2003–present)
- Tony John – lead vocals, turntables (2003–present)
- Mithun Puthanveetil – drums (2008–present)
- Binny Isaac – bass (2008–present)

Former members

- Anandraj Benjamin Paul – lead vocals (2003–2008)
- Naresh Kamath – bass (2003–2008)
- C.I. Joffy – Drums (2003–2008)
- John P. Varkey – guitar, songwriter (mid 90s)

== Discography ==
=== Studio albums ===
==== Avial (2008) ====
Avial

Studio album by Avial
- Released: 8 February 2008
- Genre: Alternative rock
- Length: 40:52
- Label: Phat Phish

This was their first studio-album Avial, released on 8 February 2008.

=== Track listing ===
| No. | Title | Writer(s) | Length |
|---|---|---|---|
| 1. | "Nada Nada Remix" | Engandiyur Chandrashekaran/John P. Varkey | 5:05 |
| 2. | "Chekkele" | Traditional | 5:02 |
| 3. | "Njan Aara" | Avial/John P. Varkey/P. B. Gireesh | 5:33 |
| 4. | "Arikuruka" | Engandiyur Chandrashekaran/Traditional | 3:43 |
| 5. | "Aranda" | P. B. Gireesh | 3:57 |
| 6. | "Karukare (feat. Aparna Sree)" | Kavalam Narayana Panicker | 6:21 |
| 7. | "Aadu pambe (feat. Aparna Sree)" | Avial/Sudhi Velamanoor | 5:22 |
| 8. | "Ettam paattu" | Avial/Sudhi Velamanoor | 5:49 |

=== Singles ===
| No. | Title | Writer(s) | Length |
|---|---|---|---|
| 1. | "Aanakallan" | | 3:58 |
| 2. | "Ayyo!" | Engandiyur Chandrashekaran | 2:56 |
| 3. | "Thithithara" | Engandiyur Chandrashekaran | 2:46 |
| 4. | "Arambath" | | 4:22 |

== See also ==
- Indian rock
- Kryptos (band)
- Bhayanak Maut
- Demonic Resurrection
- Nicotine (band)
- Inner Sanctum (band)
- Agam
- Indian Ocean
- Parikrama
- Pentagram
