= Sanjay Pinto =

Indian television personality (born 1973)

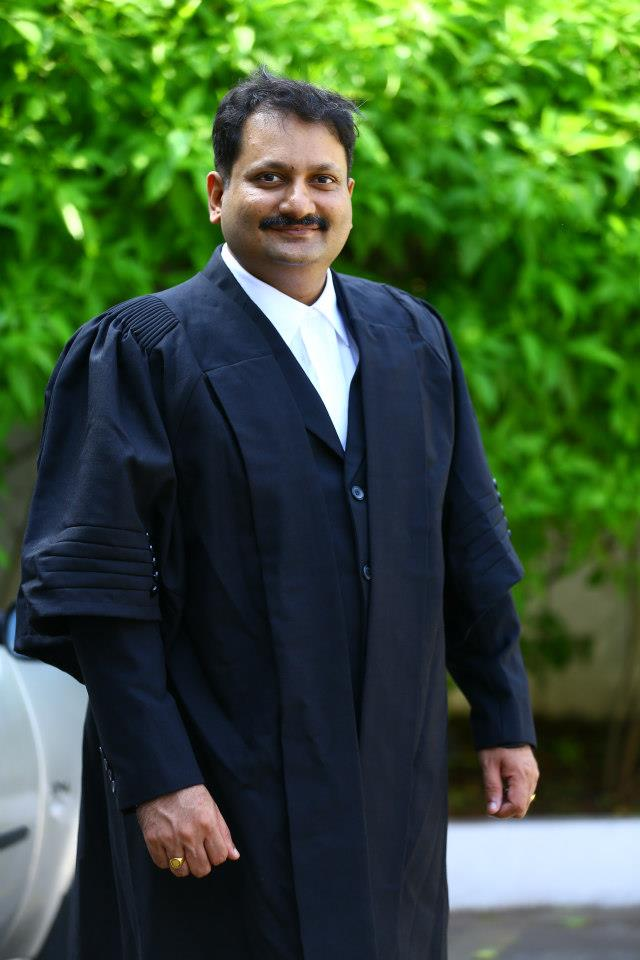
Sanjay Pinto

Sanjay Pinto (born 14 November 1973) is an Indian Advocate practising at the Madras High Court, Legal Columnist, Author of 4 books, public speaker, Former Bureau Chief and Resident Editor at NDTV 24x7 and Executive Editor at NDTV Hindu.

== Early life ==
Pinto was born to school teacher Judy Pinto and textile marketing executive Antony Vincent Pinto. Pinto studied at Don Bosco Matriculation Higher Secondary School, Egmore, Chennai. He appeared as the compere for his school play, Who Killed Cock Robin?. He was the Troop Commander of the Road Safety Patrol and was adjudged the Best Outgoing Student in 1991.

== Education ==
A student of History and Politics at Loyola College, Chennai, Pinto founded and edited a students' magazine in college, the Loyola Herald and was the President of the Loyola Debating Society. He contributed to a column called Campus Beat in the Indian Express. He won the Gold Medal and the "Most Outstanding Student of the year" award in 1994.

While at Loyola, Pinto completed a twinning course on Creative Writing through the college's tie-up with Cornell University. Pinto won the national debating championship representing the Dr. Ambedkar Government Law College, Chennai, where he completed his law degree in 1997. While in college, he was offered a weekly column in the Indian Express to review programmes on television.

== Television journalism ==
Pinto joined NDTV New Delhi Television in February 1998 as the Tamil Nadu correspondent for the 24 hour Star News Channel. He did live reports, news bulletins, and election special shows. Pinto became the Bureau Chief of Tamil Nadu and Puducherry of NDTV 24x7 in 2006. Pinto went on deputation to editorially head a new sister channel NDTV Hindu as its Executive Editor (Consultant-English News). At NDTV Hindu, Pinto spearheaded the live telecast of 17 news bulletins daily.

Pinto left NDTV Hindu in January 2012, took a sabbatical for a few months and returned to NDTV 24x7 as the Resident Editor (Consultant) for Tamil Nadu. Pinto quit NDTV in September 2012.

Pinto was conferred the Vocational Excellence Award for his contribution to the Indian Media by the Rotary Club of Madras North in 2012.

== Radio talk shows ==
Pinto used to host shows on All India Radio even as a school and college student. In 2009, Pinto conceptualised and anchored a daily debate show on ChennaiLive 104.8 FM. This was followed by other shows like 'Voice of Chennai' and 'You're Hired' (a career guidance show) and ‘Welcome Home’, a show on real estate and fine living.

== Columns ==
Pinto has been writing a weekly legal column "Justice For ALL" in the Deccan Chronicle and monthly columns in Ritz Newspaper on the bureaucracy "Corridors of Power" and social issues "point Blank".

Pinto formerly wrote a national fortnightly column on the social media for The Hindu since 2012 and a column on political issues for Tehelka.

== Books ==
Pinto's first book, Speakers Are Made Not Born is on public speaking and published by Covenant Media in 2013 and received positive reviews.

His second book Justice For All earned testimonials from the Governor of Tamil Nadu, Maharashtra Shri CH Vidyasagar Rao, and television journalist and Pinto's friend and former colleague, Arnab Goswami. "My NDTV Days" published by Pan Macmillan and "High & Law" published by Thomson Reuters are his third and fourth books.

== Public speaking ==
Pinto conducts the Landmark Debates every year. It started as a series of debates involving public figures but is now restricted to students. He is a public speaker at seminars, conferences, and panel discussions such as the Battle of Ideas. He regularly presides over Rotary Club events and Annual Day functions of educational institutions.

== Legal practice ==
Practicing as a lawyer at the Madras High Court, he specialises in Media, Constitutional, Criminal, Consumer and Arbitration Law representing celebrity clients.

Pinto represented India in the United States Consulate funded International Visitor's Leadership Program (IVLP) on the "Rule of Law & Judicial Reforms" in the United States in 2014. He is a regular panelist on legal and political issues on national TV debates. He is a guest faculty on Media Law at Symbiosis Law School, Pune.

== Personal life ==
Pinto is married to Vidya, also an Advocate, a former television journalist and former college lecturer. They have twin children (Vidan and Sanvi Pinto)
