= Nimbuzz =

Proprietary cross-platform instant messaging

- Developers: Nimbuzz; Kuraakani Online Private Limited
- Initial release: 13 May 2008
- Stable release: Android: 7.1.0 (10 March 2019; 6 years ago) [±] iOS: 5.11.0 (1 February 2018; 7 years ago) [±] BlackBerry OS: 4.0 (10 December 2013; 11 years ago) [±] Windows Phone: 1.1.8.1 (16 April 2014; 11 years ago) [±]
- Operating system: Android, iOS.
- Available in: English, Spanish, French, German, Italian, Dutch, Portuguese, Russian, Hindi, Nepali, Arabic and more.
- Type: Instant Messaging Client & VoIP
- Licence: Proprietary
- Website: www.nimbuzz.com

Nimbuzz is a proprietary cross-platform instant messaging and social media and mobile payment developed by Kuraakani Online Private Limited, with the origins of its technology dating back to the early 2000s. As of March 2013, Nimbuzz had 150 million users in 200 countries. By April 2014, Nimbuzz was growing by more than 210,000 new registrations per day. In October 2014, now with over 200 million users, New Call acquired 70% of Nimbuzz, valuing the app at $250 million. Under Nimbuzz Board & Management teams leadership, Nimbuzz suite of applications enables users to enjoy end-to-end encrypted free calls, instant messaging, games, file sharing, social networking, mobile payments & movies on their mobile device. Nimbuzz has more than 3 million lines of code. Initially, Nimbuzz offered discounted calling rates to most countries in the world. The platform processed more than a billion call minutes and in excess of 100 billion messages a month.

Nimbuzz recently relaunched itself as one of the world's few pure encrypted "SUPERAPP's" with chat, social networking, games, digital wallet, e-commerce, ott, & other unique features all integrated in it.

== Company history and background ==
Adopting the Nimbuzz brand from 2004 onwards, the company entered the mainstream Voice-over-Internet Protocol (VoIP) market in January 2007. In May 2008, the company launched its combined VoIP and instant messaging client. In January 2009, the company was selected as one of 100 winners of the Red Herring Global 100 technology industry awards for 2008.

Early stage investors over three rounds between December 2005 and July 2008 included SkypeMangrove Capital Partners, Naspers and HV Holtzbrinck Ventures, before its eventual majority acquisition by New Call in October 2014. MSM consolidated Nimbuzz with some of its other social media, digital currency, digital wallet, VoIP and instant messaging technologies in March 2017.

MSM is headquartered in Dubai with its principal development centres in Gurugram and New Delhi, India, after a relocation in May 2012 to be closer to the mobile Internet boom and rapidly growing smartphone penetration across South Asia. A fifth of Nimbuzz's users reside in India, and the app accounts for a quarter of the smartphone chat market in the country. The company has over 100 employees in its India development centres and about a further 30 in Kathmandu, Nepal. Additional offices are located in Rotterdam, the Netherlands, in San Francisco, California, in São Paulo, Brazil, and in Córdoba, Argentina, where a further software development team is located.

Revenue for the company, which in 2015 was reportedly approximately $30 million, comes from NimbuzzOut, e-commerce sales on N-World, from in-app purchases and subscriptions. An advertising and partners' platform provides the majority of the revenue. The company also partners directly with telecom operators.

== Features and functionality ==
Nimbuzz has been made available for Android, iOS, BlackBerry OS, Symbian, Windows Phone and Java ME recently on Cloudphone mobile operating systems. It was one of the few instant messaging apps available for Java-based phones, and they account for 25% of Nimbuzz users. For non-natively supported devices, a WAP interface is available. For desktop computers, clients are available for both Windows and Mac OS X. It is available in Spanish, French, German, Italian, Dutch, Portuguese, Russian, Hindi and Arabic.

Nimbuzz users can send XMPP based instant messages, images, and share their location. Group chat is also supported. Voice-over-Internet Protocol calls between most Nimbuzz clients is supported, and there is a VoIP-to-PSTN (landline/cellular) service branded as NimbuzzOut. Nimbuzz can be set up with any valid SIP (VoIP) account.

Nimbuzz supported interaction with popular messaging services such as Twitter, Facebook Chat and Google Talk. In February 2012, Nimbuzz announced the discontinuation of support for ICQ, AIM, Myspace and Hyves because of the general lack of usage of these chat services.

Nimbuzz has an in-app portal called N-World, with applications, gifts, games, avatars and other virtual goods for sale. N-World has its own digital currency called Nimbuckz.
