= Celkon =

Indian manufacturer of smartphones and accessories

- Type: Private
- Industry: Telecommunications, Consumer Electronics
- Founded: 2009
- Headquarters: Hyderabad, Telangana, India
- Area served: Worldwide
- Key people: Y Guru(Chairman)
- Products: Mobile Phones, Smartphones, Tablets
- Revenue: ▲₹925 crore (US$99 million)
- Website: www.celkonmobiles.com

Celkon is an electronics manufacturing company in India based at Hyderabad. It used to manufacture dual-sim and single sim, VoLTE and LTE smartphones, feature phones and Android and Windows tablets. Its smartphones were sold under two brands: CAMPUS and a high-end series MILLENNIA.

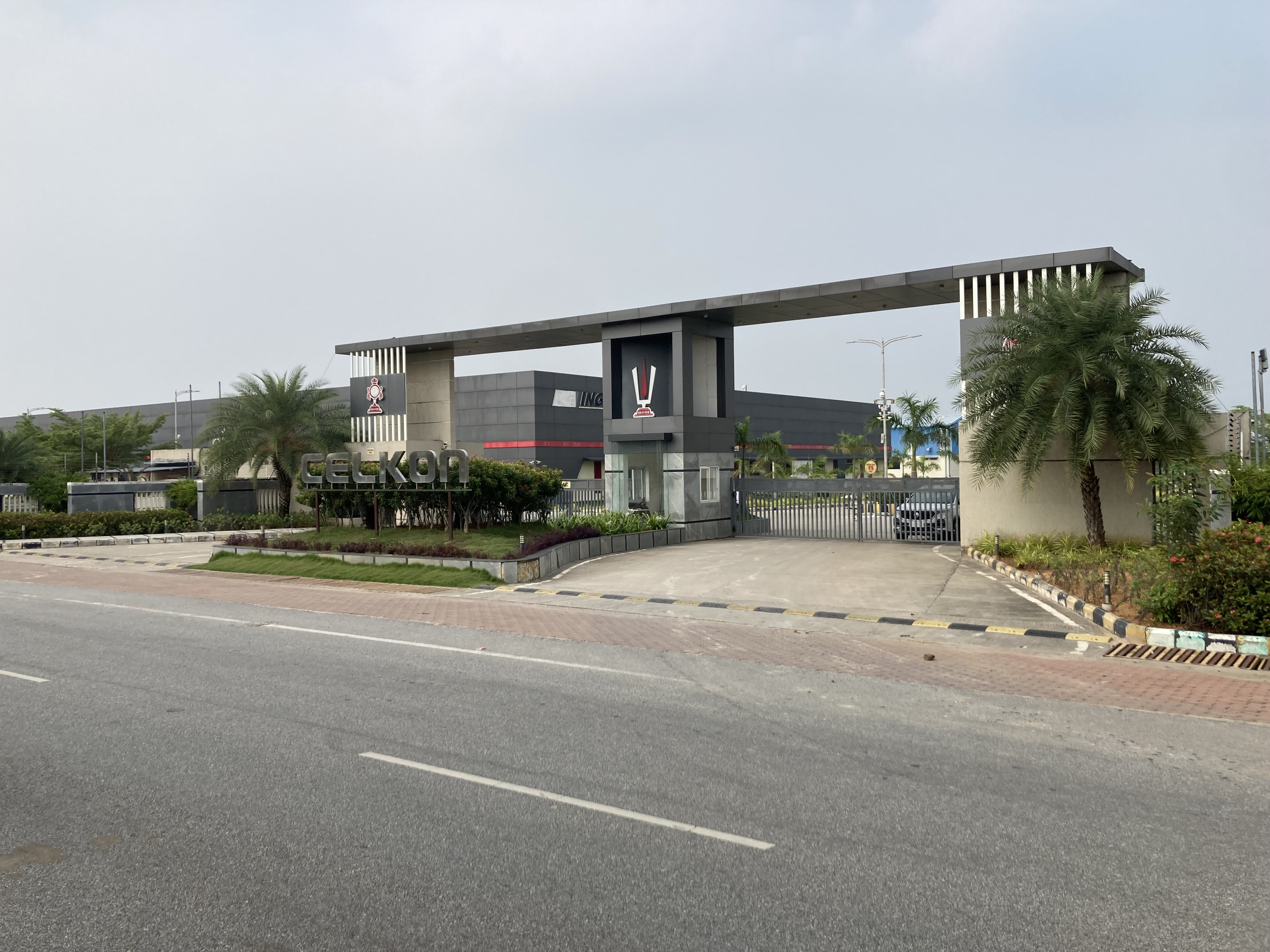
Celkon Manufacturing plant at Tirupati

The founder and CMD of Celkon group is Y. Guru. Initially its mobiles and tablet PCs were assembled in Taiwan and China. Celkon started its assembly line in Medchal, Hyderabad with a capacity of 200,000 mobile phones and later set up two more units – one in Tirupati, Andhra Pradesh and other in Hyderabad, Telangana. However, the company ended up for lack of innovation and funding and now does not produce dual-sim and single sim, VoLTE and LTE smartphones, feature phones and Android and Windows tablets.
