= City Union Bank =

Indian private sector bank

City Union Bank Limited
- Type: Public
- Traded as: NSE: CUB; BSE: 532210
- Industry: Banking, Financial services
- Founded: 1904 (122 years ago)
- Founders: R. Santhanam Iyer; S. Krishna Iyer; V. Krishnaswami Iyengar; T. S. Raghavachariar
- Headquarters: Kumbakonam, Tamil Nadu, India
- Number of locations: 1000 branches (2026)
- Key people: G.Mahalingam (Chairman); R.Vijay Anandh (MD & CEO)
- Products: Asset management, Consumer banking, Corporate banking, Finance and Insurance, Forex, Investment banking, Mortgage loans, Payment solutions, Private banking
- Revenue: ▲₹6,012.22 crore (US$620 million) (2024)
- Operating income: ▼₹1,516.73 crore (US$160 million) (2024)
- Net income: ▲₹1,015.73 crore (US$110 million) (2024)
- Total assets: ▲₹70,825.86 crore (US$7.4 billion) (2024)
- Number of employees: 7188 (2024)
- Capital ratio: 23.7% (2024)
- Website: https://www.cityunionbank.bank.in

City Union Bank Limited is an Indian private sector bank headquartered in Kumbakonam, Tamil Nadu. The bank was initially named Kumbakonam Bank Limited, and was incorporated on 31 October 1904. The bank focused on operating as a regional bank in Kumbakonam, Tamil Nadu.

== History ==
The City Union Bank Limited was originally incorporated under the name Kumbakonam Bank as a limited company on 31 October 1904.

The bank preferred a regional role and adopted an agency model in the initial years. The first branch was opened in 1930. In 1987, the name of the bank was changed to City Union Bank.

The first branch outside the state of Tamil Nadu was opened at Sultanpet, Bangalore in Karnataka in September,1980.

The Bank started its own Staff Training College on 21st August, 1989 at Kumbakonam.

== Operations ==
In FY26 the bank had a market capitalization of ₹93.62 billion (US$970 million) and operated 932 branches, and 1762 ATMs.

== See also ==
- Banking in India
- List of banks in India
- Reserve Bank of India
- Indian Financial System Code
- List of largest banks
- List of companies of India
- Make in India
