= Joe Paul (lyricist) =

Indian lyricist and music composer

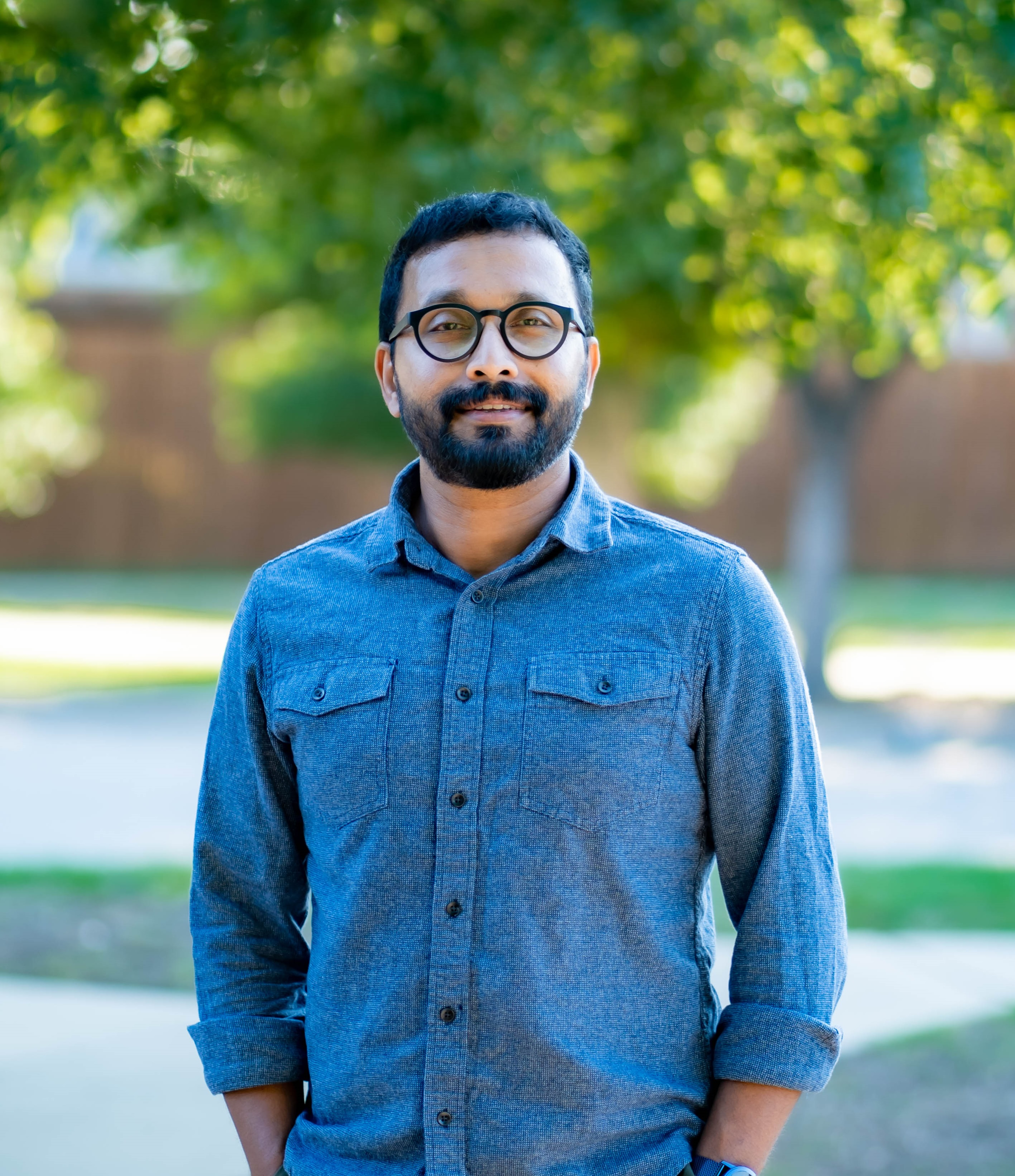
- Born: Kunnamkulam, Kerala, India
- Education: Kerala Agricultural University; University of Minnesota
- Occupation: Lyricist
- Years active: 2000–present
- Spouse: Dhanya
- Children: Samuel (son); Isaiah (son)
- Parents: P. P. Paul (father); Baby Paul (mother)

Joe Paul is an Indian lyricist and music composer who works in Malayalam Cinema. He began his film career in 2015 with the movie You Too Brutus.

== Early life and background ==
Paul was born in Kunnamkulam, Thrissur, Kerala to P. P. Paul and Baby Paul and grew up in Kochi. He graduated with a BSc Agriculture from Kerala Agricultural University, and master's from the University of Minnesota. He is settled in Dallas with his family.

== Writing career ==
In 2000, Paul composed and wrote his first work Krooshitharoopam, a devotional song. He made his debut as a lyricist in the Malayalam film industry in 2015 with the song Raavukalilfor the movie You Too Brutus. His popular works include lyrics for the songs from the movies Queen, Dear Comrade, Ranam, Ishq etc.

== Filmography ==
=== As lyricist ===
Year	Song	Film	Composer	Singer	Remarks
2015	Mazhamegha	Rasputin	Roby Abraham	Roby Abraham, Ajay Sathyan	
2015	Raavukalil	You Too Brutus	Roby Abraham	Madonna Sebastian	
2018	Saare Njangal	Queen	Jakes Bejoy	Benny Dayal, Jakes Bejoy, Zia Ul Haq, Kavita Gopi, Zonobia Safar	
2018	Aaraandaa	Queen	Jakes Bejoy	Ajaey Shrvan, Jakes Bejoy, Keshav Vinod	
2018	Podipaarane	Queen	Jakes Bejoy	Ajaey Shrvan, Sunil Kumar, Keshav Vinod	
2018	Ponnumkasavitta	Queen	Jakes Bejoy	Neha Nair	
2018	Nenjinakath Lalettan	Queen	Jakes Bejoy	Jakes Bejoy, Dijo Jose Antony	
2018	Maayilla Njaan	Queen	Jakes Bejoy	Sruthy Sasidharan	
2018	Ini Raave	Ranam	Jakes Bejoy	Vidhu Prathap	
2018	Ayudham Eduda	Ranam	Jakes Bejoy	Fejo, Jakes Bejoy, Fu Ra, Ajaey Sharavan	Co-writer: Fura, Fejo
2018	Vijana Vazhikalil (Kaathangal)	Swathanthryam Ardharathriyil		Sreekumar Vakkiyil	
2018	Nee Vilagi	Dha Dha 87	Lander Lee Marty	Anand Aravindakshan, Sruthy Sasidharan	Co-writer: Vijay Sri G
2019	Parayuvaan	Ishq	Jakes Bejoy	Sid Sriram, Neha S. Nair	
2019	Peda Peda	Porinju Mariam Jose	Jakes Bejoy	Jakes Bejoy, Keshav Vinod, Jithin, Merrin Gregory	
2019	Kinavoo (Thenthulli)	Manoharam	Sanjeev Thomas	Sanjeev Thomas, Shweta Mohan	
2019	Munnotitha	Manoharam	Sanjeev Thomas	Sanjeev Thomas	
2019	Veyilnaalangal (Thaaro)	Manoharam	Sanjeev Thomas	Vineeth Sreenivasan	
2019	Akale	Manoharam	Sanjeev Thomas	Sid Sriram	
2019	Neerolam Mele Moodum	Dear Comrade	Justin Prabhakaran	Gowtham Bharadwaj	
2019	Madhu Pole	Dear Comrade	Justin Prabhakaran	Sid Sriram, Aishwarya Ravichandran	
2019	Thiri Thiri	Dear Comrade	Justin Prabhakaran	Remya Nambeesan, Nakul Abhyankar	
2019	Canteen	Dear Comrade	Justin Prabhakaran	Jakes Bejoy	
2019	Dear Comrade Anthem	Dear Comrade	Justin Prabhakaran	Dulquer Salmaan, Dope Daddy, Stony Psyko	
2019	Thaalam Kottedo	Dear Comrade	Justin Prabhakaran	Sarath Santhosh	
2019	Ee Kathayo	Dear Comrade	Justin Prabhakaran	Sathya Prakash, Chinmayi Sripaada	
2019	Mazhamegham	Dear Comrade	Justin Prabhakaran	Sooraj Santhosh	
2019	Jimmy ivan keniyaada	Jimmy Ee Veedinte Aishwaryam	Arun Daan	Mithun Ramesh, Divya Pillai, Divyavalli Santhosh	
2019	Praanaantham Kaliyudham	Kalki	Jakes Bejoy	Jakes Bejoy, Zeba Tommy	
2019	Red Blue Black	Kalki	Jakes Bejoy	Jakes Bejoy, Niranj Suresh, Keshav Vinod, Ajaey Shravan	
2020	Ilam Poove	Anveshanam	Jakes Bejoy	Sooraj Santhosh	
2020	Minnaninja Raave	Deira Diaries	Sibu Sukumaran	Najim Arshad, Aavani Malhar	
2020	Saayaahnamegham	Deira Diaries	Sibu Sukumaran	Vijay Yesudas	
2020	Sararaanthale	Deira Diaries	Sibu Sukumaran	K. S. Harisankar	
2020	Maanin Mizhiyulla (Penne)	2 States	Jakes Bejoy	Karthik	
2020	Yaathana Dandana	Durgamati	Jakes Bejoy		
2020	Neelayaamangal	Vrithakrithiyilulla Chathuram	Ajmal Hasbulla	Harish Sivaramakrishnan	
2020	Chiraku Vanna	Vrithakrithiyilulla Chathuram	Ajmal Hasbulla	Harris Mihraj	
2021	Iruvazhiye	Operation Java	Jakes Bejoy	Alan Joy Mathew Parvathy Nair, Vivzy	
2021	Varavayi Nee	Sara's	Shaan Rahman	Vineeth Sreenivasan, Divya Vineeth	
2021	Nenjame Nenjame	Sara's	Shaan Rahman	Vineeth Sreenivasan, Gowri Lakshmi	
2021	Tharam marannoromal	Sara's	Shaan Rahman	Nithya Mammen	
2021	Lokam Cheradinja Golam	Bhramam	Jakes Bejoy	Prithviraj Sukumaran	
2021	Venmukile	The Cabin	Hesham Abdul Wahab	KS Harishankar	
2022	Jana Gana Mana Anthem	Jana Gana Mana	Jakes Bejoy	Shankar Mahadevan	Co-writer: Raqeeb Alam
2022	Doorangal Thedi	Archana 31 Not Out	Rajat Prakash	Tessa Chavara	
2022	Kannil Minnum Mandaaram	Meppadiyan	Rahul Subramaniyan	Karthik, Nithya Mammen	
2022	Mele Vaanil	Meppadiyan	Rahul Subramaniyan	Vijay Yesudas	
2022	Swapnadoorame	Radhe Shyam	Justin Prabhakaran	Sathya Prakash	
2022	Malarodu Saayame	Radhe Shyam	Justin Prabhakaran	Sooraj Santhosh	
2022	Ninnale Ninnale	Radhe Shyam	Justin Prabhakaran	Anurag Kulkarni, Shweta Pandit	
2022	Kaanaakkare	Radhe Shyam	Justin Prabhakaran	Nihas Saidq, Harini Ivaturi	
2022	Sundarippenne	Lal Jose	Binesh Mani	Sid Sriram	
2022	Kannum Kannum	Lal Jose	Binesh Mani	Vijay Yesudas	
2022	Theeyaanu Chankathu	Pathrosinte Padappukal	Jakes Bejoy	Kapil Kapilan	
2022	Padakalunare	Panthrandu	Alphons Joseph	Alphons Joseph	
2022	Vaanathiril	Panthrandu	Alphons Joseph	Shahabaz Aman	
2022	Thuzhayumo	Panthrandu	Alphons Joseph	Alphons Joseph	
2022	Pularaan Marannu	Kaduva	Jakes Bejoy	Jakes Bejoy	
2022	Maarivilthoovale	Ullasam	Shaan Rahman	Harib Hussain, Sanah Moidutty	
2022	Pakalo Kaanaathe	Saudi Vellakka	Palee Francis	Job Kurien	
2022	Panthumaay Doore	Aanapparambile World Cup	Jakes Bejoy	Sailakshmi, Sreehari, Akshith, Richu	
2022	Madhurajeevaraagam	Sundari Gardens	Alphons Joseph	Mridula Warrier	
2022	Maayamoham	Sundari Gardens	Alphons Joseph	Alphons Joseph, Sithara (singer)	
2022	Paaduvaan	Sundari Gardens	Alphons Joseph	Alphons Joseph, Mridula Warrier	
2022	Naal Haritham	Sundari Gardens	Alphons Joseph	Alphons Joseph	
2022	Sooryaamsame	Sundari Gardens	Alphons Joseph	Mridula Warrier	
2022	Nilaathumbi Nee	Saturday Night	Jakes Bejoy	Vijay Yesudas	
2022	Mandarappoove	Kumari	Jakes Bejoy	Aavani Malhar	
2022	Enthaada Saji	Enthada Saji	Jakes Bejoy	Jakes Bejoy	Motion Title Poster track
2022	Cheranaadu	Paper Rocket	Simon K. King	Ramya Nambessan	Co-writer: Ku. Karthick
2023	Maayunnuvo	Janaki Jaane	Sibi Mathew Alex	Sooraj Santhosh	
2023	Novaathe	Janaki Jaane	Sibi Mathew Alex		
2023	Minnal Minnane	2018 - Everyone Is A Hero	William Francis	Shankar Mahadevan	
2023	Venmegham	2018 - Everyone Is A Hero	Nobin Paul	KS Harishankar	
2023	Innithile	2018 - Everyone Is A Hero	Nobin Paul	Ezma Nobin	
2023	Uyiraay Maarave	2018 - Everyone Is A Hero	Nobin Paul		
2023	Udayam	2018 - Everyone Is A Hero	Nobin Paul		
2023	Kalapakkaara	King of Kotha	Jakes Bejoy		
2023	Kotha Bharikkunna	King of Kotha	Jakes Bejoy	Jakes Bejoy	
2023	Kannil Njano	Chitta	Dhibu Ninan Thomas	Haricharan, Chinmayi Sripaada	
2023	Theera Swaasame	Chitta	Dhibu Ninan Thomas	Benny Dayal	
2023	Ariyanila	Chitta	Santhosh Narayanan	Aditya Ravindran	
2023	Silayaay	Aval Peyar Devayani	Aby Tom Cyriac		
2024	Oru Naaloru Naal	Malayali From India	Jakes Bejoy	KS Harishankar	
2024	Mandaarappoovum	Abhirami	Sibu Sukmaran	Sachin Warrier, Nithya Mammen	
2024	Mandaarappoovum	Mazhavillin	Sibu Sukmaran	Sanah Moidutty	
2024	Naayo Nariyo	Checkmate	Ratish Sekhar	KS Harishankar, Keerthana Vijay Ratish Sekhar	
2024	Moolokam	Checkmate	Ratish Sekhar	Ratish Sekhar	
2024	Ullaasam	Surya's Saturday	Jakes Bejoy	Devanand Sp, Sruthy Sivadas	
2024	Sa Ri Ma Pa	Surya's Saturday	Jakes Bejoy	Najim Arshad	
2024	Puliyaa	Surya's Saturday	Jakes Bejoy		
2024	Vaarilam Raagam	Surya's Saturday	Jakes Bejoy		
2024	Dimbhaka	Surya's Saturday	Jakes Bejoy		
2024	Idi Garjjana	Surya's Saturday	Jakes Bejoy		
2024	Yudhathinu	Surya's Saturday	Jakes Bejoy		
2024	Iravukal	Surya's Saturday	Jakes Bejoy		
2024	Arumakkili	Hello Mummy	Jakes Bejoy	Sujatha Mohan	

== Non-Film Songs ==
No	Year	Song	Album / Single	Composer	Singers
1	2016	Kannodu Kannil	Veruthe	Roby Abraham	Madonna Sebastian
2	2017	Oru neram	Kadalassu Thoni	Aby Tom Cyriac	Afzal Yusuff, Roopa Revathi
3	2017	Thenoliyumaay	Kadalassu Thoni	Aby Tom Cyriac	Roopa Revathi
4	2017	Madhumozhi	Madhumozhi	Appu John	Najim Arshad
5	2018	Kaarmukile	December	Hariprasad	Hariprasad
6	2018	Doore Doore	Harsham	Syamdas	Sanoop Kumar
7	2018	Unaroo Keralame	Unaroo	Joby Mackolil	Vidhu Prathap, Zonobia Safar
8	2019	Thirayum Manalum	Café Love	Aby Tom Cyriac	Thaha Kolpad, Neerada Sheen
9	2019	Maayunnuvo	November	Aby Tom Cyriac	Afzal Yusuf
10	2020	Kannadikkaade	Namma Kanath	Afzal Yusuf	Sooraj Santhosh
11	2020	Kaathil Veezhum	Kaathil Veezhum	K J Jomon	Mithun Jayaraj
12	2020	Chithram	Chithram	Appu John	Najim Arshad
13	2020	Paalnilaavil	Mazhayil	Nithin George	Nithin George
14	2020	Aaru Nee	Rithu	Prithviraj MR	Sudeep Palanad, Beena Liboy
15	2021	Neeyaam	Neeyaam Nizhalil	Jubair Muhammed	Varshith Radhakrishnan
16	2022	Kaanaakkinaavin	Paathi	Jubair Muhammed	Harib Hussain
17	2022	Thaniye	Sameera	Hesham Abdul Wahab	Hesham Abdul Wahab
18	2022	Kannoram	Himalayan Love Story	Varun Krrishna	Naresh Iyer

== Devotional Songs ==
No	Year	Song	Album / Single	Composer	Singers
1	2007	Thiruhridayam	Ennennum Yesuvinte	Joe Paul	Madhu Balakrishnan
2	2007	Eden Vaniyil	Ennennum Yesuvinte	Soby Chacko	Sujatha Mohan
3	2007	Ente Yesuvin	Ennennum Yesuvinte	Joe Paul	Kester
4	2007	Onnunarnnu Njaan	Ennennum Yesuvinte	Appu John	Karthik
5	2007	Ente Yesuvin	Ennennum Yesuvinte	Joe Paul	Swetha Mohan
6	2011	Kroositharoopam	Manassu	Joe Paul	Anju Joseph
7	2011	Eeso Ennum	Manassu	Joe Paul	Joe Paul
8	2011	Sukhamakkoo	Manassu	Soby Chacko	Sikha Nair
9	2011	Nee Niraamayan	Manassu	Appu John	Neha Nair
10	2011	Eesoye	Manassu	Soby Chacko	Suchith Suresan
11	2011	Kroositharoopam	Manassu	Joe Paul	Joe Paul
12	2011	Eeso Ennum	Manassu	Joe Paul	Megha Jacob
13	2011	Pithaave	Manassu	Joe Paul	Nitin Raj
14	2011	Munthirichedi	Manassu	Soby Chacko	Amal Antony
15	2011	Eesoye	Manassu	Soby Chacko	Bhadra Rajin
16	2011	Udayasooryane	Manassu	Appu John	Arun Alat
17	2013	Enne Ariyunna	Single	Appu John	Najim Arshad
18	2017	Neehaara Raavu	Single	Jafeth Jose	Jafeth Jose
19	2019	Swarggam Kaviyukayaay	Single	Joby Mackolil	Tojo Varghese, Sreya Jayadeep
20	2021	Mizhikalaavolam	Single	Joby Mackolil	Tojo Varghese, Sreya Jayadeep

== Awards ==
=== International Indian Film Academy Awards ===
- 2024 - IIFA Award for the best lyrics (Malayalam) - 2018 - "Venmegham", "Uyiraay"
