= Malayalee from India =

- Theatrical release poster
- Directed by: Dijo Jose Antony
- Written by: Sharis Mohammed
- Produced by: Listin Stephen
- Starring: Nivin Pauly Dhyan Sreenivasan Deepak Jethi Anaswara Rajan Yashika Sharma
- Cinematography: Sudeep Elamon
- Edited by: Sreejith Sarang
- Music by: Jakes Bejoy
- Production company: Magic Frames
- Distributed by: Magic Frames
- Release date: 1 May 2024
- Running time: 158 minutes
- Country: India
- Language: Malayalam
- Box office: est.₹18.37 crore

Malayalee From India is a 2024 Indian Malayalam-language survival comedy-drama film directed by Dijo Jose Antony, written by Sharis Mohammed, and produced by Listin Stephen for Magic Frames. It stars Nivin Pauly, Dhyan Sreenivasan, Anaswara Rajan and Yashika Sharma in lead roles, while Deepak Jethi and Shine Tom Chacko play the supporting roles. The film's music was composed by Jakes Bejoy.

Malayalee from India was released on 1 May 2024 to mixed reviews from critics with praise for its cast performance and soundtrack but criticism for its writing, screenplay dialogues and pace. It was a box office bomb.

== Plot ==
Set in the village of Mullakara in Kerala's Kannur district, the narrative follows Aalparambil Gopi, a young man leading a carefree life. Gopi spends his days playing cricket and engaging in local political activities, often aligning with nationalist ideologies. His closest companion, Malghosh, shares his penchant for mischief, leading them into various troubles that exasperate Gopi's hardworking mother, Suma, who shoulders the family's financial burdens.

Gopi harbors affection for Krishna, a younger woman from the village. Their budding relationship, however, is overshadowed by escalating communal tensions. An incident during a cricket match, where children from the Muslim community celebrate Pakistan's victory, ignites misunderstandings. This event, exacerbated by existing prejudices, leads to violent clashes between Hindu and Muslim communities in Mullakara. Caught in the turmoil, Malghosh suffers injuries, and Gopi becomes a target for both the police and enraged villagers. To ensure his safety, Gopi's family arranges for him to work abroad.

Gopi finds himself in a desolate desert region, employed on a camel farm under the supervision of Sahib, a Pakistani national. Initial interactions between Gopi and Sahib are strained, reflecting their deep-seated biases. However, as they confront challenges together—such as Gopi contracting COVID-19 and Sahib caring for him, and Gopi defending Sahib from attackers—their relationship evolves into a profound friendship. Sahib shares his personal tragedies, including the loss of his son due to extremist violence, and his hopes for his daughter, Dua, emphasizing the transformative power of education.

Tragically, Sahib succumbs to COVID-19. Honoring his friend's memory, Gopi travels to Rawalpindi to meet Sahib's family. He encourages Dua to pursue her education, gifting her a copy of "Wings of Fire" to inspire her aspirations. Five years later, Dua addresses the United Nations, attributing her achievements to the "man from India" who changed her life. Back in Mullakara, Gopi has transformed, distancing himself from divisive politics and earning Krishna's affection. The film concludes with Gopi welcoming a Pakistani worker, reflecting on his journey towards empathy and unity.

== Cast ==
- Nivin Pauly as Aalparambil Gopi
- Dhyan Sreenivasan as Malghosh KP, Gopi's Best Friend
- Anaswara Rajan as Krishna, Gopi's Love Interest
- Deepak Jethi as Jalal Bin Omar Al Rashid aka Sahib
- Yashika Sharma as Dua, Jalal Bin Omar's daughter
- Salim Kumar as Hamsa / Hamsakka
- Manju Pillai as Suma, Gopi's Mother
- Shine Tom Chacko as District Collector Sajin Babu IAS (Cameo)
- Vijayakumar as Murali, Gopi's Uncle
- Nandu as Bharathan, Gopi's Uncle
- Sandhya as Vaishnavi, Gopi's Sister
- Shaju Sreedhar as Malghosh's Father
- Santhosh G. Nair as Political Leader
- Dijo Jose Antony as Shyju, KPSC Coaching Centre Faculty (Cameo)
- Aju Varghese as Muafaq, Sahib's Co-Worker (Voice-Over)
- Mathew Thomas as Krishna's Bestie (Photo Presence)

== Production ==
The film's title was announced in December 2023 with a promotional video.

== Music ==
The music and background score is composed by Jakes Bejoy, in his maiden collaboration with Nivin Pauly; thirdth with Dijo Jose Antony after Queen (2018) and Jana Gana Mana (2022). The audio rights were acquired by Magic Frames Music. The first single "Krishna Song" was released on 24 March 2024. The second single "World Malayalee Anthem" was released on 20 April 2024. The last single "The World of Gopi" was released on 28 April 2024. The entire soundtrack album was released on 30 April 2024.

Track listing
No.	Title	Lyrics	Singer(s)	Length
1.	"Krishna Song"	Titto P. Thankachen	Vineeth Sreenivasan	3:56
2.	"World Malayalee Anthem"	Sharis Mohammed; Suhail Koya; Asal Kolaar	Akshay Unnikrishnan; Jakes Bejoy; Asal Kolaar (Tamil Rap)	4:19
3.	"The World of Gopi"	Suhail Koya	Abhijith Anilkumar	4:04
4.	"Veruthe Haath Tharunne"	Suhail Koya	Jakes Bejoy; Suhail Koya	4:13
5.	"Hey Rabba Rabba"	Titto P. Thankachen	Vaikom Vijayalakshmi	3:18
6.	"Daivame Daivame"	Titto P. Thankachen	Nikhil Prabha; Akhil J Chand	3:41
7.	"Orunnaal Orunnaal"	Joe Paul	K. S. Harisankar; Ishaan Nigam	4:52
8.	"Poru Poru"	Anwar Ali	Jakes Bejoy; Amal C Ajith; Daniel Joseph Antony; Midhun Anand; Maneeth Manoj; Gayathry Rajiv; Avani Malhar	3:04

== Release ==
=== Theatrical ===
Malayalee from India was released in theatres on 1 May 2024.

=== Home media ===
The film's post-theatrical digital streaming rights were acquired by Sony LIV, and started streaming on 5 July 2024.

== Reception ==
Gopika I. S. of The Times of India gave 3/5 stars and wrote, "The message of the film is clear but it goes to deliver it in such a roundabout way that one would feel like they watched two different films". Rohit Panikker of Times Now gave 3.5/5 stars and wrote, "If anything, this film is saved by some relatable moments of humour, a little bit of bold political statements, and a solid performance by Nivin Pauly".

Rashmi Kuttan of Asianet Newsable wrote that, "The anticipation is palpable, especially after Nivin's impressive cameo in Varshangalkku Shesham alongside Dhyan Sreenivasan. With the dynamic duo reuniting, this time as buddies, expectations are soaring". Sanjith Sidhardhan of OTTPlay gave 3.5/5 stars and wrote, "Whether you are a fan of political satires or entertainers, this Nivin Pauly-starrer has enough to keep you entertained in theatres".

Janani K of India Today gave 2.5/5 stars and wrote, "Throw in some Pakistani education activist Malala Yousafzai, you get 'Malayalee From India". Anandu Suresh of The Indian Express wrote that, "In short, Malayalee From India is loud, irritating and underwhelming and serves as a reality check for Malayalees amidst the recent flurry of successful films".

S. R. Praveen of The Hindu wrote that, "Some subtlety and an organic narrative could have gone a long way into turning this into a much more relevant film than it is now". Latha Srinivasan of Hindustan Times wrote that, "Malayalee From India is disappointing and is not the comeback that the talented Nivin Pauly deserves".

Arjun Menon of Film Companion wrote that, "However, the execution feels far-fetched and overdrawn and this affects any sense of engagement with the film's flawed yet fascinatingly interwoven political vision".
