= Ayyappanum Koshiyum (soundtrack) =

Soundtrack album by Jakes Bejoy
- Released: 10 February 2020
- Recorded: 2019–2020
- Genre: Feature film soundtrack
- Length: 16:00
- Language: Malayalam
- Label: Manorama Music
- Producer: Jakes Bejoy

Jakes Bejoy chronology
Anveshanam (2020)	Ayyappanum Koshiyum (2020)	Mafia: Chapter 1 (2020)
External audio
- Audio Jukebox on YouTube

Ayyappanum Koshiyum is the soundtrack to the 2020 film of the same name directed by Sachy starring Prithviraj Sukumaran and Biju Menon. The film's soundtrack featured four songs composed by Jakes Bejoy, with lyrics written by B. K. Harinarayanan, Rafeeq Ahamed and Nanjiyamma. The soundtrack was released by Manorama Music on 10 February 2020.

== Development ==
Jakes Bejoy researched on the music for around a year and found over 300 folk styles that has been used in the music of Kerala. Given that the film is set in Attappadi, Bejoy went with tribal music as per Sachy's suggestion and cited Ludwig Göransson's score for Black Panther (2018) as an inspiration for the film's music. Hence, he decided to meet a tribal troupe in Attappadi and while recording the samples for the music, he found that Nanjiyamma's voice stood out for the film. Nanjiyamma has been part of the Azad Kala Samithi which performed several music and dance-related events across and outside Kerala. Pazhani Swamy S, the leader of the troupe said that 11 members from the troupe had recorded a session in Kochi, while the songs were recorded in Chennai.

The title track "Kalakkatha" was chosen from the many songs that the troupe performed at the studio with their own percussion instruments. Bejoy sampled those instruments played by the troupe, and blended those cues through his keyboard. Bejoy further felt that Nanjamma was not comfortable singing at the studio as "She couldn't keep up with the rhythm. So we had to adjust the tempo after the recording".

== Track listing ==
No.	Title	Lyrics	Singer(s)	Length
1.	"Ariyathariyathe"	Rafeeq Ahamed	Kottakkal Madhu	4:50
2.	"Thaalam Poyi"	Rafeeq Ahamed	Jakes Bejoy, Sangeetha Sajith, Nanjiyamma	5:22
3.	"Kalakkatha"	Nanjiyamma	Nanjiyamma	2:04
4.	"Adakachakko (Promo Song)"	B. K. Harinarayanan	Prithviraj Sukumaran, Biju Menon, Nanjiyamma	3:44
Total length:				16:00

== Reception ==
Anjana George of The Times of India wrote "Jakes Bejoy makes the film natural with his music by blending it very well with the visuals". Vishal Menon of Film Companion complimented the music as "great", and Cris of The News Minute wrote "Jakes Bejoy’s music adds a mystical element to the narration". Navamy Sudhish of The Hindu wrote "The music is another vital aspect, which adds to the tempo of the film". Anna M. M. Vetticad of Firstpost described it as "folksy, poignantly earthy".

Award (Note: Awards, festivals and organizations are in alphabetical order.)	Date of ceremony (Note: Date is linked to the article about the awards held that year, wherever possible.)	Category	Recipient(s)	Result	Ref.
Filmfare Awards South	9 October 2022	Best Lyricist – Malayalam	Rafeeq Ahamed – (for song "Ariyathariyathe")	Won	
Kerala State Film Awards	17 December 2021	Special Mention	Nanjiyamma – (for the song "Kalakkatha")	Won	
National Film Awards	30 September 2022	Best Female Playback Singer	Nanjiyamma – (for song "Kalakkatha")	Won	
South Indian International Movie Awards	19 September 2021	Best Music Director – Malayalam	Jakes Bejoy	Won	
South Indian International Movie Awards	19 September 2021	Best Lyricist – Malayalam	Rafeeq Ahamed – (for song "Thaalam Poyi")	Nominated	
South Indian International Movie Awards	19 September 2021	Best Female Playback Singer – Malayalam	Nanjiyamma – (for song "Kalakkatha")	Nominated	
South Indian International Movie Awards	19 September 2021	Best Female Playback Singer – Malayalam	Sangeethaa Sajith – (for song "Thaalam Poyi")	Nominated	
