= Sudeep Elamon =

Indian cinematographer

- Born: Thiruvananthapuram, Kerala, India
- Occupation: Cinematographer
- Years active: 2017
- Notable work: Ayyappanum Koshiyum (2020); Jana Gana Mana (2022)

Sudeep Elamon is an Indian film director, cinematographer who works in the Malayalam cinema. He won the SIIMA Awards for Best Cinematography for his work in Ayyappanum Koshiyum (2020).

== Career ==
Sudeep's first directorial and director of photography was the film Sleeplessly Yours. He became known for films like Pathinettam Padi (2018), Ayyappanum Koshiyum (2020), Jana Gana Mana (2022).

== Filmography ==
- All films are in Malayalam, unless mentioned otherwise.

As cinematographer
Year	Title	Director	Notes
2018	Pathinettam Padi	Shanker Ramakrishnan	Debut
2019	Finals	Arun P. R.	
2020	Ayyappanum Koshiyum	Sachy	
2022	Aviyal	Shanil	
2022	Jana Gana Mana	Dijo Jose Antony	
2023	B 32 Muthal 44 Vare	Shruthi Sharanyam	
2024	Malayalee from India	Dijo Jose Antony	
2025	Madharaasi	A. R. Murugadoss	Tamil film
2026	Kattalan	Paul George	Additional cinematography
2026	Thudakkam	Jude Anthany Joseph	Additional cinematography
