= Baby Girl (film) =

2026 Indian Malayalam-language thriller film

- Theatrical release poster
- Directed by: Arun Varma
- Written by: Bobby-Sanjay
- Produced by: Listin Stephen
- Starring: Nivin Pauly; Sangeeth Prathap; Lijomol Jose
- Cinematography: Faiz Siddik
- Edited by: Shyjith Kumaran
- Music by: Sam C. S.
- Production company: Magic Frames
- Distributed by: Magic Frames
- Release date: 23 January 2026
- Running time: 124 minutes
- Country: India
- Language: Malayalam
- Box office: est. ₹5 crore

Baby Girl is a 2026 Indian Malayalam-language medical thriller film directed by Arun Varma and written by the screenwriter duo Bobby–Sanjay. The film is produced by Listin Stephen under the banner of Magic Frames. It stars Nivin Pauly, Sangeeth Prathap, Lijomol Jose, Abhimanyu Shammi Thilakan, Aditi Ravi, Azees Nedumangad, and Aswanth Lal.

This film was released on 23 January 2026 and received mixed to negative reviews from critics. The film was a box office bomb.

== Plot ==
The story is set mainly in a hospital in Thiruvananthapuram, Kerala, where a three-day-old baby girl goes missing from the maternity ward under baffling circumstances. Sanal Mathew (played by Nivin Pauly) is a hospital attendant who arrives late for his shift on the day the infant vanishes. Because of his lateness and his presence at the scene, he immediately comes under suspicion from the police and hospital authorities. As the investigation unfolds, tension rises and suspicion spreads. Sanal, desperate to clear his name, starts his own search for the missing child, digging deeper into the case and uncovering hidden secrets and unexpected truths within the hospital environment. The narrative explores how pressure, fear, and suspicion affect everyone involved — from staff to family members — and raises questions about innocence, guilt, and responsibility.

The film plays out as a high-stakes mystery thriller, with much of the action and revelations occurring within a short span of time, keeping the audience on edge as the truth behind the baby’s disappearance slowly comes to light.

== Cast ==
- Nivin Pauly as Sanal Mathew
- Sangeeth Prathap as Rishi
- Lijomol Jose as Rithu
- Rudraksh as the titular baby girl (three day old infant)
- Aditi Ravi as Sini
- Abhimanyu Shammi Thilakan as SI Rakesh Narayan
- Azees Nedumangad as ASI Akbar
- Major Ravi as Commissioner of Police Shameer Musthafa IPS
- Sreejith Ravi as Circle Inspector Sujith
- Mythili Nair as Meenakshi
- Akshay Prashanth as Akash
- Jaffar Idukki as Security Sukumaran
- Aswath Lal as CPO Jeffin
- Alphy Panjikaran as Meenakshi's sister
- Nandhu as Akash's father
- Nisha Sarangh as Akash's mother
- Ranjini George as Meenakshi's mother
- Prem Prakash as Chief Minister
- James Eliya as Meenakshi's father
- Kichu Tellus as Binoy
- Anoop Krishnan as Police Constable
- Archana Prakash as Sister Nisha

== Production ==
=== Development ===
In January 2025, Baby Girl was officially announced with Nivin Pauly in the lead role, marking his reunion with writers Bobby–Sanjay after Kayamkulam Kochunni. The film is the second directorial of Arun Varma after Garudan.

=== Casting ===
In April 2025, the makers announced that Nivin Pauly had replaced Kunchacko Boban as the lead actor due to scheduling conflicts. The decision was taken shortly before the commencement of filming and was officially confirmed by multiple publications.

=== Filming ===
Principal photography for Baby Girl began in April 2025 in Thiruvananthapuram. Nivin Pauly joined the sets during the second schedule of filming, which took place later that month. The shooting was completed after multiple schedules across Kerala, with reports confirming the wrap-up in late 2025.

=== Marketing ===
The first look and motion poster of Baby Girl were unveiled during the Onam festival. The promotional material introduced Nivin Pauly’s character, Sanal Mathew, and suggested a dark, suspense-driven narrative.

== Soundtrack ==
The music of the film is composed by Sam C. S.

No.	Title	Lyrics	Singer(s)	Length
1.	"Baby Girl Promo Song"	Vaisakh Sunagan	Sam C.S.	3:00
Total length:				3:00

== Release ==
=== Theatrical ===
The film was released on 23 January 2026.

=== Home media ===
The post theatrical digital streaming rights of the film were acquired by SonyLIV.

== Reception ==
Anandu Suresh of The Indian Express said that “Not only do Bobby and Sanjay fail to raise the stakes in the Nivin Pauly-starrer, but they also fail to ensure adequate character development or to anchor the narrative strongly somewhere”. Vishal Menon of The Hollywood Reporter India said that “Instead of getting Ritu to sit across Meenakshi to have an extremely difficult conversation, what we see is a convoluted mess with this baby being treated like a package that goes missing”.
