= Garudan (2023 film) =

2023 Indian Malayalam film

- Theatrical release poster
- Directed by: Arun Varma
- Screenplay by: Midhun Manuel Thomas
- Story by: Jinesh M
- Produced by: Listin Stephen
- Starring: Suresh Gopi; Biju Menon
- Cinematography: Ajay David Kachappilly
- Edited by: Sreejith Sarang
- Music by: Jakes Bejoy
- Production company: Magic Frames
- Distributed by: Magic Frames
- Release date: 3 November 2023
- Running time: 138 minutes
- Country: India
- Language: Malayalam
- Budget: est. ₹7 crore
- Box office: est. ₹27.35 crore

Garudan (transl. Brahminy kite) is a 2023 Indian Malayalam-language crime thriller film directed by Arun Varma in his directorial debut, written by Midhun Manuel Thomas and produced by Listin Stephen under the banner Magic Frames. The film stars Suresh Gopi and Biju Menon in the lead roles, alongside Siddique, Jagadish, Abhirami, Divya Pillai, Thalaivasal Vijay, Major Ravi, Dileesh Pothan, and Nishanth Sagar in supporting roles. The film revolves around a legal conflict between DCP Harish Madhav (Gopi), a police officer, and Nishanth Kumar (Menon), a college professor, following the brutal sexual assault of a student.

Garudan was released in theatres on 3 November 2023 to positive reviews from critics and emerged as a commercial success, emerging as the seventh highest-grossing Malayalam film of 2023.

== Plot ==
Theresa Philip, a college student, is sexually assaulted, and Deputy Commissioner of Police Harish Madhav is assigned to investigate the case. Salam Kyperi, who witnessed the perpetrator, provides the police with information. Their investigation leads them to Sudev V. Rajan, a Hyderabad-based IT professional whose DNA matches that found in the case. Sudev's connection to college professor Nishanth Kumar leads Harish to him, and Salam identifies Nishanth as the perpetrator. Based on the evidence collected by Harish, Nishanth is arrested and charged. Harish's friend, Advocate Thomas Iype, represents the prosecution and secures Nishanth's conviction, resulting in a life sentence.

Seven years later, Theresa remains in a coma, while her father, Colonel Philip George, is suffering from Alzheimer's disease. Harish receives a transfer to the Kerala Armed Police shortly before his retirement. After his release from prison, Nishanth reunites with his wife Haritha and their daughter, although Haritha remains distant towards him. Harish plans to use his retirement benefits to support his son Vijay's education and settle into a quiet life with his wife Sreedevi. He also gives a statement against Minister Mathew in connection with a dollar-smuggling case.

On the day of Harish's retirement as Deputy Commandant, Nishanth files a petition before the Kerala High Court seeking a retrial. The court agrees to reconsider the case. At Iype's request, Harish assists with the proceedings. Harish and Iype visit Salam's wife and persuade her to have Salam testify. During the retrial, Iype represents the state, while Nishanth, who obtained an LL.B. degree while in prison, chooses to represent himself.

Nishanth challenges Salam's credibility by establishing that he is a chronic alcoholic and disputes the reliability of the DNA report submitted by the laboratory director. He also asks the court for permission to practise as an advocate and to suspend his conviction. During the proceedings, a burglar named Murugan confesses to assaulting Theresa. Nishanth is consequently acquitted, and the court orders Harish to pay him ₹70 lakh as compensation for defamation.

Following his humiliation, Harish sends his family to Palakkad. Nishanth begins practising law and reconciles with Haritha and their daughter. Although Iype believes that they made a mistake in the original investigation, Harish remains convinced that he acted correctly. After returning home, Harish discovers that his house has been vandalised and that his pet dog Drake has been killed. He initially suspects Nishanth, but later learns that Minister Mathew and his associates were responsible.

Harish visits Jayadevan, the superintendent of Central Prison, Viyyur, who tells him about Nishanth's relationship with Nari Suni, an influential prisoner. Harish concludes that Nishanth had deliberately manipulated the retrial and the witnesses to establish his innocence, but Iype dismisses this as speculation. Harish later tells Iype that he suspects Nishanth intends to attack Arunima, an intern at Nishanth's office.

While following Arunima, Harish discovers her unconscious in a public toilet. After she regains consciousness and sees Harish, she mistakenly believes that he attacked her. Sub-inspector Varghese Cherian arrests Harish and places him in custody. Nishanth decides to represent Harish and visits him in the lock-up to obtain an authorisation letter. Harish tells Nishanth about his investigation into Suni's rise as the wealthy businessman Sunil Kumar and his alleged manipulation of witnesses to secure acquittals.

Harish eventually admits that he made a mistake in the original investigation into Theresa's assault by failing to conduct a thorough background investigation. He begins to suspect that Nishanth may have been responsible for the deaths of Safia Sait and Sunita Sharma. Nishanth then reveals that he has committed two additional murders that were unknown to Harish, confirming Harish's suspicions about his involvement in multiple killings.

Nishanth subsequently takes radio jockey Neethu hostage at Harish's house and informs Harish of his actions. However, when he arrives at the house, he finds Haritha instead. He realises that the situation has been orchestrated by Harish, Inspector General Cyriac Joseph and Varghese Cherian to expose his involvement in the murders and his obsession with killing.

During the court proceedings, Philip informs Harish and Iype that Theresa has died. Iype requests that Nishanth also be charged under Section 302 of the Indian Penal Code for her murder. The court orders the Kerala Police to conduct a further investigation and declares Nishanth an accused in the case. Nari Suni, Murugan and several others are also ordered to be investigated as co-accused.

In a post-credits scene, Mathew and his private secretary are travelling in a vehicle when their path is blocked by a broken-down truck in an isolated area. Harish approaches Mathew and shows him a photograph of Drake, asking whether he has seen the film John Wick. The vehicle's doors then lock, trapping Mathew and his secretary inside, while their driver is nowhere to be seen.

== Cast ==
- Suresh Gopi as DCP Harish Madhav IPS
- Biju Menon as Ex-Prof. Adv. Nishanth Kumar
- Siddique as Adv. Thomas Iype, Harish's best friend and public prosecutor
- Jagadish as Salaam Kaiperi
- Abhirami as Sreedevi Madhav, Harish's wife
- Divya Pillai as Haritha Kumar, Nishanth's wife
- Thalaivasal Vijay as Colonel Philip George
- Major Ravi as Dr. Babu Mathew, Central Chemical Laboratory Director, Kochi
- Dileesh Pothan as IG Cyriac Joseph IPS, Commissioner of Kochi City Police
- Jayan Cherthala as Ex-Minister Mathew Peter
- Arjun Nandhakumar as SI Alex George
- Jaise Jose as Thaskara Murugan
- Santhosh Keezhattoor as SI Cherian Varghese
- Josekutty Jacob Kochuparambil as Sudev V. Rajan
- Malavika Vipin as Arunima
- Chaithania Prakash as Theresa Philip
- Krishna Vijayachandran as Vijay Madhav, Harish's son
- Nishanth Sagar as "Nari" Suni / Sunil Kumar
- Dinesh Prabhakar as Shaji, Nishanth's friend
- Balaji Sarma as Haridas, a college lecturer and Nishanth's friend
- Megha Thomas as RJ Neethu
- Dinesh Panicker as the Magistrate of the District and Sessions Court, Ernakulam
- Sadiq as Jail Superintendent Jayadevan
- Mahesh as the Magistrate of the District and Sessions Court, Ernakulam
- Kalabhavan Haneef as Charlie, a tea vendor
- Prem Prakash as Samuel John
- Kichu Tellus as Jijo Manalil, a fishmonger at Vypin Harbour and Smitha's husband
- Saranya Anand as Smitha Jijo
- Ambika Mohan as Nishanth's relative
- Ranjini George as Raziya, Salaam's wife
- James Eliya as Doctor
- Listin Stephen as George (cameo appearance)

== Production ==
=== Development ===
The core storyline for Garudan was conceived by Jinesh M, drawing inspiration from case studies he reviewed while pursuing his Master of Laws from the National University of Advanced Legal Studies in 2015. Jinesh was introduced to filmmaker Arun Varma through a mutual friend, and the duo selected the story of Garudan from a pool of potential concepts they discussed. Jinesh and Arun approached several producers with the story before getting Listin Stephen on board. They completed the first draft of the screenplay in 2019. Stephen brought writer and director Midhun Manuel Thomas on board, who revised and rewrote the final script. The project was officially announced on 15 April 2023, coinciding with the occasion of Vishu. The film marks the reunion of Suresh Gopi and Biju Menon after 13 years. They previously acted together in the 2011 film Christian Brothers.

=== Casting ===
Biju Menon was initially considered for the role of the police officer, but expressed interest in playing the professor's role. Suresh Gopi, who initially intended to play the professor's role, later agreed to play the police officer's role. The film marks the reunion of Gopi and Menon following their last appearance together in Christian Brothers (2011).

=== Filming ===
Following an announcement in April 2023, the film began principal photography on 12 May 2023 in Kochi. The filming began with a pooja ceremony in the presence of Abhirami, Thalaivasal Vijay, Midhun Manuel Thomas, Listin Stephen and Major Ravi. Major Ravi lit the Nilavilakku first and gave the first clap, while the film's story writer, Jinesh M, performed the switch-on. Suresh Gopi joined the film set on 15 May 2023. Biju Menon joined the set at the beginning of July after completing his shoot for Jis Joy's film. Union Christian College at Aluva was also used for filming. Apart from Kochi, Hyderabad was another main shooting location. The shoot took place for 75 days on three schedules. The entire filming wrapped up on 19 August 2023 in Kochi and entered post-production work. Suresh Gopi completed his dubbing portions in the first week of October 2023.

== Music ==
The songs and background score are composed by Jakes Bejoy in his third collaboration with Magic Frames, following Jana Gana Mana and Kaduva in 2022.

Track listing
No.	Title	Lyrics	Singer(s)	Length
1.	"Tear My Soul" (English)	Clint Lewis	Clint Lewis	1:54
2.	"Koorambay"	Anwar Ali	Zeba Tommy	2:55
3.	"Move On" (English)	Clint Lewis	Clint Lewis	1:26
Total length:				6:15

== Release ==
=== Theatrical ===
The film was censored with a U/A certificate by the Central Board of Film Certification. A preview of the film was held at PVR INOX at LuLu Mall, Kochi on 2 November 2023. Garudan was released in theatres on 3 November 2023.

=== Home media ===
Amazon Prime Video acquired the digital rights and began streaming it on 1 December 2023.

== Reception ==
=== Box office ===
Garudan reportedly collected ₹1.15 crore on its opening day. The film grossed a total of ₹5.25 crores from the Kerala box office, in its first five days.

The film grossed ₹16.3 crore in Kerala, ₹1.5 crore in the rest of India, and ₹9.55 crore overseas, totaling ₹27.35 crore worldwide and thereby becoming a commercial success. It earned $17,343 in the United Kingdom, $9,922 in Australia, and $4,818 in New Zealand. It earned a total of $898,000 from GCC, $112,000 from Canada, $32,000 from USA and $4000 from Singapore.

=== Critical response ===
Garudan received positive reviews from critics.

Subhash K. Jha of Times Now gave 3.5 out of 5 stars and wrote, "Garudan is a compelling beast of a film. It grips you by the neck and hurls you from one twist to another until you are pleasantly exhausted at the end while reaching a culmination that is both expected and unexpected." Gopika Is of The Times of India gave 3.5 out of 5 stars and wrote, "Arun Varma's Garudan is a perfect dose of everything for Malayali audiences who go to theatres with not much hope now." Vignesh Madhu of Cinema Express gave 3.5 out of 5 stars and wrote, "Pitted against each other in equally prominent roles, seasoned performers Suresh Gopi and Biju Menon keep us on the edge of our seats."

Anandu Suresh of The Indian Express gave 3 out of 5 stars and wrote, "Garudan is undoubtedly a breath of fresh air for viewers inundated with mindless thrillers that have dominated our industries in recent times." Neelima Menon of OTTPlay gave 3 out of 5 stars and wrote, "You might guess how Garudan a tense investigative thriller, will unravel. But the cleverness of its execution will still leave you impressed." S. R. Praveen of The Hindu wrote, "If Garudan manages to keep on flying, it is only due to the strength of the story at its core, although one wishes things were a bit more convincing." Princy Alexander of Onmanorama wrote, "Though the screenplay by Jinesh and Midhun Manuel is good, there are some weak moments in the film. The second half feels rushed, which affects the climax slightly. Nevertheless, the movie offers a lot of interesting twists that keep the audience engaged."

== Future ==
In an interview with The Hindu, Arun Varma said that a sequel to Garudan is likely, and that he and Midhun Manuel Thomas are working on it.
