= Pallichattambi =

2026 Indian Malayalam-language film

- Theatrical release poster
- Directed by: Dijo Jose Antony
- Written by: S. Suresh Babu
- Produced by: Noufal; Brijeesh; Chanukya Chaithanya Charan
- Starring: Tovino Thomas; Kayadu Lohar
- Cinematography: Tijo Tomy
- Edited by: Sreejith Sarang
- Music by: Jakes Bejoy
- Production companies: World Wide Films; C Qube Bros Entertainments
- Distributed by: Chakra Pictures
- Release date: 15 April 2026
- Country: India
- Language: Malayalam
- Budget: est. ₹45 crore
- Box office: est. ₹20 crore

Pallichattambi (transl. Church-rowdy) is a 2026 Indian Malayalam-language period action drama film directed by Dijo Jose Antony and written by S. Suresh Babu. It stars Tovino Thomas in a lead role alongside Kayadu Lohar, Shatru, Vijayaraghavan, Siddique, Baburaj, Nibraz Noushad, T. G. Ravi, Johny Antony, Sudheer Karamana, Alexander Prasanth, Midhun Venugopal, and Eldho Mathew. Prithviraj Sukumaran appears in an cameo appearance as the main antagonist in this film. The film's soundtrack is composed by Jakes Bejoy.

The film was released worldwide on 15 April 2026 with dubbed versions in Tamil, Telugu, Hindi, and Kannada. The film received negative reviews and was a box-office bomb..

== Plot ==
The story is set in the 1930s British Raj and begins by introducing the ruthless antagonist, Pattelar Kunjambu Nambiar "The Great". It then shifts to a young baby whose family, living in South Canara—Malabar border of Madras Presidency (now Karnataka—Kerala border) is murdered by Pattelar's goons—either for robbery or to seize their land. The child is the only survivor. His hand bears a tattoo with the name “Krishna Pillai,” hinting at the name of a prominent Communist leader, and his family were the rightful owners of the land Pattelar is searching for. He was rescued by a Christian priest and a few local Hindu families in the region, who adopted him as their own. The plot continues with the adoptive family and sister being killed later, for a different reason, due to Pattelar's influence over the police.

In 1958, the Liberation Struggle rages across Kerala against the ruling Communist Party. During this period, in the small village of Kaaniyar, the Church—feeling threatened by the Communists—searches for a “Christopher,” someone who can protect it. The men sent by the Church find such a person in Krishna Pillai, whom they introduce as Pothan Christopher. Upon arriving in Kaaniyar, Pothan thrashes the Communists and, with his cheerful personality, wins over the hearts of the villagers.

Later, the Church faces a new threat in the form of Ningalenne Communistakki, a play famed for propagating Communism. Pothan promises to prevent the play from being staged, but upon reaching the venue, he is reminded of his sister's death and becomes unable to stop it. During this time, he befriends the lead actress, Rebecca, after saving her from a kidnapping attempt. Before parting ways, Rebecca confides in him about the threats she faces for refusing to give up her land, where she plans to build a school open to all.

The following day, the Church turns against Pothan for failing in his task and for allegedly “hiding” his true identity. He is expelled from Kaaniyar. On his way home, he shares a bus ride with Rebecca, during which they develop a romantic bond. After Pothan gets off, Rebecca continues her journey, only to be fatally shot by Rairu Ramanna, an ACP notorious for inciting violence and killing innocent civilians.

Under Ramanna's orders, riots erupt in multiple places, claiming numerous lives. Krishna Pillai witnesses one such riot and is confused as the rioters speak a different language. He later comes across Rebecca's corpse and is puzzled to find ink on her thumb. He takes her body back to Kaaniyar for burial. Meanwhile, Ramanna targets Kaaniyar next, planning to wipe it out completely. Fortunately, a young man from Puthupally named Oommen Chandy warns the villagers in time.

Under Krishna's leadership, the Church and the various communities of Kaaniyar unite to fight the police forces sent by Ramanna. They successfully defend the village, and Krishna kills Ramanna, who, before dying, warns that the true lord of Kaaniyar is yet to come.

This lord is none other than Nambiar—the same man responsible for the deaths of Krishna's parents and sister. Pattelar is a ruthless feudal lord who runs a mining company and owns a mountain near Kaaniyar, rich in gold. After investing heavily in mining operations that were rejected by the newly formed Communist government under E. M. S. Namboodiripad, he orchestrates multiple riots and frames them as anti-Communist uprisings. He is also revealed to be the one who ordered Rebecca's murder, as she refused to part with her land, and who instructed Ramanna to incite violence and destroy Kaaniyar, which lay in the path to the mountain.

As peace returns to Kaaniyar, tensions between the Church and the Communists ease. The villagers realise that humanity stands above divisions of religion, caste, and political ideology. Together, they decide to build a school open to all communities, fulfilling Rebecca's dream. Krishna is welcomed back as the protector of Kaaniyar.

A year later, at Talakaveri, Krishna confronts Nambiar, setting the stage for a sequel.

== Cast ==
- Tovino Thomas as Krishna Pillai / Pothan Christopher
- Prithviraj Sukumaran as Pattelar Kunjambu Nambiar alias "The Great" (cameo appearance)
- Kayadu Lohar as K. P. A. C. Rebecca, Krishna Pillai's love interest
- Shatru as ACP Rairu Ramanna IPS
- Vijayaraghavan as Fr. Pulamplaavil
- Siddique as Ex. Additional Home Secretary Eappan Daniel
- Baburaj as "Quintal" George
- Nibraz Noushad as Saly, Krishna Pillai's friend and helper
- T. G. Ravi as Fr. Gregory
- Johny Antony as Aanandan Muthalali
- Sudheer Karamana as Kuncheria
- Alexander Prasanth as Chamakkala Devassy
- Abu Salim as Martin
- Josekutty Jacob as Fr. Cyriac
- Devika Anoop as Saramma
- Vinod Kedamangalam as Pappi
- Midhun Venugopal as Davi
- Eldho Mathew as Rathnakaran
- Unni Raja as K&K bus driver
- Ratheesh Rama as Chief Minister E.N.S
- Muhammed Faizal as Chief Secretary
- Alex E. Kurian as Political Secretary
- Aadukalam Naren as Ayyanar Perumal
- Dhruvan as Kannappa Nambiar, Pattelar Kunjambu Nambiar's Brother
- Ravi Mariya as Sakthivel
- Dijo Jose Antony as Photographer (cameo appearance)

== Production ==
Principal photography began in Thodupuzha and extended across multiple states. Costume design was overseen by Manjusha Radhakrishnan. Sound design was handled by Sync Cinema, with art direction by Rajesh Menon and casting by Binoy Nambala.

== Release ==
The film was released worldwide on 15 April 2026 on Vishu.

The digital rights of the film were acquired by SonyLIV. The film premiered on 23 July 2026, a day before the announced date.

== Reception ==
=== Critical reception ===
Pallichattambi received mixed-to-negative reviews.

S. R. Praveen of The Hindu wrote, "Tovino Thomas brings an admirable physicality to the role, but the weak screenplay doesn’t allow him to do anything more. The period setting is inconsistent. The hint dropped at the climax regarding a sequel, without entirely resolving the narrative conflict in this part, becomes another dampener. The director follows the easy decision chosen by many filmmakers and screenwriters these days, with the sequel never materialising. Pallichattambi is an ahistorical period movie that fails to take off."

Gopika Is of The Times of India rated the film 3/5 stars and wrote, "With too many ideas crammed into a film that is a little over two hours, many are left underdeveloped. ... While avoiding clichés is difficult here, the presentation goes slightly overboard. ... The ending feels undecided — it could have stopped at the night fight or been extended into a fuller final showdown."

Anandu Suresh of The Indian Express rated the film 1.5/5 stars and wrote, "Although Tovino Thomas' performance is better than what he delivered in Narivetta, some of his acting choices have detracted from the experience."

Prathyush Parasuraman of The Hollywood Reporter India described the film as "Full of idealism, lacking fire" and wrote, "Even as Pallichattambi walks that path of love, it quickly steers away into the battleground of good VS evil, one that is bored by repetition, frustrated by lethargy, and drowned by density."

Arjun Menon of Rediff.com rated the film 2/5 stars and wrote, "Pallichattambi is a functional exercise in action cinema, that neither focuses on the logistics of its action choreography, nor makes the setting rousing enough to meet the expectations of a 'chosen one' narrative. The action, though not overused as in many contemporary movies, feels incidental and old-fashioned without any of the slickness associated with the current standards of hand-to-hand combat scenes in our films."

Vignesh Madhu of The New Indian Express rated the film 2/5/5 stars and wrote, "Pallichattambi had all the ingredients to be a standout entry in Tovino’s filmography. With a sharper focus, more layered storytelling, and restraint in its scale-driven approach, it could have been a more compelling socio-political drama. Instead, it remains a film of unrealised potential, weighed down by its own ambitions."

Princy Alexander of Onmanorama wrote, "Tovino Thomas leads an emotionally charged period drama which feels too familiar."
