= Hello Mummy =

2024 Indian film

- Theatrical release poster
- Directed by: Vaishakh Elans
- Written by: Sanjo Joseph
- Produced by: Jomin Mathew; Aibin Thomas; Rahul E.S
- Starring: Sharafudheen; Aishwarya Lekshmi
- Cinematography: Praveen Kumar
- Edited by: Chaman Chakko
- Music by: Songs: Jakes Bejoy; Aswin Ram; Score: Jakes Bejoy
- Production companies: Hangover Films; A&HSProductions
- Distributed by: Dream Big Films
- Release date: 21 November 2024
- Running time: 135 minutes
- Country: India
- Language: Malayalam
- Box office: ₹ 18 crore

Hello Mummy is 2024 Indian Malayalam-language horror comedy film directed by Vaishakh Elans and written by Sanjo Joseph. In the film, Boney is about to marry Stephy, but he is haunted by the ghost of her dead mother, who dislikes him. The film stars Sharafudheen and Aishwarya Lekshmi, alongside Jagadish, Johny Antony, and Sunny Hinduja (in his Malayalam debut).

It was released on 21 November 2024. The film was a commercial success at box office.

== Plot ==
Boney, a carefree and mischievous man, avoids marriage despite his family's constant efforts. He runs a pet shop and spends most of his time with his malicious best friend, Bichu. His brother-in-law, who runs a matrimonial office, finally convinces him for the sake of family to meet Stephy, a highly educated woman, assuming she will reject him. However, Boney and Stephy unexpectedly develop a connection.

As their relationship grows, Stephy raises a condition before wedding — Boney must move into her house after marriage. Soon after, she abruptly cuts contact, later explaining that her late mother Grace’s spirit disapproves of him. Boney initially dismisses this as an excuse, but after their wedding, he experiences the spirit's presence firsthand when an invisible force physically throws him out of the bedroom. Living in Stephy’s house, Boney struggles with strict household rules dictated by Grace's spirit. Determined to win Grace’s approval, Boney and Stephy communicate secretly via text, as Grace can only hear spoken words. They fake a pregnancy announcement to gain sympathy, but chaos ensues when Boney’s intoxicated father disrupts the house. Meanwhile, Boney is warned by an investigative journalist, Boss, that Stephy’s family harbors a dark secret. Though skeptical, Boney seeks the help of Kanchamma, a fading spiritual expert, when a sinister man named Aashabha offers to remove Grace's spirit. Aashabha, however, is revealed to be a spirit hunter, seeking to capture and exploit powerful souls.

In a climactic showdown at Aashabha’s lair, Grace’s spirit and Kanchamma join forces to protect Stephy and Boney. Ultimately, the evil is vanquished and the spirit is set free, bringing peace to Stephy’s family.

== Cast ==
- Sharaf U Dheen as Boney
- Aishwarya Lekshmi as Stephy
- Sunny Hinduja as Aashabha
- Jagadish as Samuel, Stephy's father
- Johny Antony as Philip, Boney's father
- Aju Varghese as Boss, investigative broadcaster
- Joemon Jyothir as Bichu
- Bindu Panicker as Kanchamma / Professor
- Arun Cherukavil as Fr. Francis
- Ganga Meera as Soyamma, Boney’s Mother
- Sruthy Suresh as Tincy, Boney's Sister
- Adhri Joe as Boney's Brother in law

== Music ==
The film has songs composed by Jakes Bejoy and Aswin Ram.

Track listing
No.	Title	Lyrics	Music	Singer(s)	Length
1.	"Readya Maaran"	Mu.Ri	Jakes Bejoy	Dabzee, Ziya Ul Haq, Jakes Bejoy	3:48
2.	"Pulliman Kannile"	Manu Manjith	Jakes Bejoy	Deepak Nair	3:14
3.	"Hello Mummyfied"	Adhri Joe	Aswin Ram	Adhri Joe	2:24
4.	"Arumakkili"	Joe Paul	Jakes Bejoy	Sujatha Mohan	3:57
Total length:					9:26

== Reception ==
The film received mixed reviews from critics.

Anna Mathews of The Times of India rated the film two-and-a-half out of five stars and wrote that "The script by Sanjo Joseph of Falimy fame and direction by debutant Vaishakh Elans feels a bit disjointed. Even the editing by Chaman Chakko doesn't make the scenes flow smoothly." Anandu Suresh of The Indian Express gave it two out of five stars and opined that "From the start, Sanjo Joseph's script and Vaishakh's direction fail to deliver the comedy, only evoking weak smiles from audiences. By relying too much on familiar, clichéd moments that come with portraying characters like Bony, the film is unable to keep the viewers engaged and both the humour and situations come across as half-baked or forced."

Vivek Santhosh of The New Indian Express gave it two out of five stars and wrote that "With tighter editing and a more focused script, Hello Mummy could have been a somewhat fun 90-minute entertainer. Instead, it drags on, with redundant sequences, especially with the scenes involving Aju Varghese, and an overblown climax that sacrifices coherence for spectacle. While the ending teases a sequel, the idea of revisiting this world feels more like a threat than a promise." Shilpa Nair Anand of The Hindu wrote, "The film is not intellect-stimulating, nor is it gory. It is the kind of breezy film you can watch as a family. If we can forgive Bhool Bhulaiyaa 3, then say, Hello Mummy."

Arjun Ramachandran of The South First gave it three out of five stars and wrote that "Hello Mummy is a horror comedy that entertains and does justice to its genre. Performances by Sharafudheen, Aishwarya Lekshmi, Jagadish and other actors are the major highlights of the movie." Swathi P. Ajith of Onmanorama wrote that "As for the horror aspect, the film successfully introduces a mystical and fantastical vibe. Vaishakh leans heavily on slapstick comedy for most of the film, and it works for the most part."
