= Jakes Bejoy =

Indian music composer

- Born: Erattupetta, Kottayam, Kerala, India
- Occupations: Music composer; Keyboardist; Singer
- Years active: 2007–present
- Musical career
- Genres: Film score; Soundtrack; Synthpop; World Music; Game music
- Instruments: Keyboard, Synthesizer [Guitar]
- Labels: Goodwill Entertainments; Manorama Music; Magic Frames Music; Lyca Music; Sony Music India; Saregama

Jakes Bejoy is an Indian film composer and playback singer. He primarily works in Malayalam cinema, along with Tamil and Telugu films. He made his debut as a film composer with the Malayalam thriller Angels (2014). He is known for his constributions to the films Queen (2018), Swathanthryam Ardharathriyil (2018), Ranam (2018), Ishq (2019), Kalki (2019), Porinju Mariam Jose (2019), Ayyappanum Koshiyum (2020) and Lokah Chapter 1: Chandra (2025).

Jakes is known for combining electronic and contemporary production with regional and folk musical elements. His score for Ayyappanum Koshiyum incorporated elements of Kerala's tribal music, following research into various folk traditions. He subsequently composed music for films including Forensic (2020), Operation Java (2021), Kuruthi (2021), Kaduva (2022), Jana Gana Mana (2022), King of Kotha (2023), Officer on Duty (2025), Thudarum (2025), Narivetta (2025), Thudarum (2025) and Lokah Chapter 1: Chandra (2025). He has also worked in Tamil and Telugu cinema, including Dhuruvangal Pathinaaru (2016), Taxiwaala (2018), Mafia: Chapter 1 (2020), Chaavu Kaburu Challaga (2021), Oke Oka Jeevitham (2022), Por Thozhil (2023) and Saripodhaa Sanivaaram (2024).

== Early life and education ==
Born in Erattupetta, Kottayam, Kerala to Bejoy Jacob and Shammy Bejoy. Jakes is trained in Carnatic music. He attained a bachelor's degree in Electronics and Communication Engineering at the Rajagiri School of Engineering and Technology in Kochi, India. Jakes earned his master's degree in Music Science and Technology from Stanford University, California.

== Career ==
Following Jakes' graduate studies at Stanford, he became an intern at Activision Blizzard working on the Guitar Hero series. He also worked with the audio team at The Walt Disney Company on video games including Cars, Brave, and Toy Story 3.

In 2013, Jakes moved back to India to pursue more film composing work and received an offer to work on the Malayalam film Angels. He has since worked as music director and written music for successful Malayalam, Tamil and Telugu films such as Dhuruvangal Pathinaaru, Ranam, Queen, Swathanthryam Ardharathriyil, Monsoon Mangoes, Taxiwala (starring Telugu debut), Saripodha Sanivaram, and more recently, box-office record holders like Thudarum and Lokah Chapter 1: Chandra.

In 2021, Jakes won "Best Music Director – Malayalam" at the South Indian International Movie Awards for his score for Ayyappanum Koshiyum, one of the highest-grossing films of 2020.

He had a phenomenal year in 2025, scoring major back to back hits with Officer on Duty, Thudarum, Narivetta and Lokah Chapter 1: Chandra.

Jakes is a member of the executive committee of FEFKA (Film Employees Federation of Kerala)’s Music Directors’ Union (FEMU).

== Discography ==
Key
†	Denotes films that have not yet been released

Year	Title	Language	Songs	Background Score	Notes	Ref.
2014	Angels	Malayalam	Yes	Yes	Malayalam Debut	
2015	Thakka Thakka	Tamil	Yes	Yes	Tamil Debut	
2016	Monsoon Mangoes	Malayalam	Yes	Yes		
2016	Kavi Uddheshichathu..?	Malayalam	Yes	Yes		
2016	Dhuruvangal Pathinaaru	Tamil	Yes	Yes		
2017	Chennaiyil Oru Naal 2	Tamil	Yes	Yes		
2018	Queen	Malayalam	Yes	Yes		
2018	Mannar Vagaiyara	Tamil	Yes	Yes		
2018	Swathanthryam Ardharathriyil	Malayalam	Yes	No		
2018	Ranam	Malayalam	Yes	Yes		
2018	Taxiwala	Telugu	Yes	Yes	Telugu debut	
2019	The Gambinos	Malayalam	Yes	Yes		
2019	Mera Naam Shaji	Malayalam	No	Yes		
2019	Ishq	Malayalam	Yes	Yes		
2019	Suttu Pidikka Utharavu	Tamil	Yes	Yes		
2019	Kakshi: Amminippilla	Malayalam	No	Yes		
2019	Kalki	Malayalam	Yes	Yes		
2019	Porinju Mariam Jose	Malayalam	Yes	Yes		
2020	Anveshanam	Malayalam	Yes	Yes		
2020	Ayyappanum Koshiyum	Malayalam	Yes	Yes		
2020	Mafia: Chapter 1	Tamil	Yes	Yes		
2020	Forensic	Malayalam	Yes	Yes		
2020	2 States	Malayalam	Yes	Yes		
2020	Adho Andha Paravai Pola	Tamil	Yes	Yes	Unreleased	
2020	Mamakiki	Tamil	Yes	Yes	Released on ZEE5	
2020	Durgamati	Hindi	No	Yes	Hindi Debut; Direct OTT release on Amazon Prime	
2021	Operation Java	Malayalam	Yes	Yes		
2021	Chaavu Kaburu Challaga	Telugu	Yes	Yes		
2021	Kuruthi	Malayalam	Yes	Yes		
2021	Bhramam	Malayalam	Yes	Yes		
2022	Salute	Malayalam	Yes	Yes		
2022	Pathrosinte Padappukal	Malayalam	Yes	Yes		
2022	Jana Gana Mana	Malayalam	Yes	Yes		
2022	CBI 5	Malayalam	Yes	Yes		
2022	Puzhu	Malayalam	Yes	Yes		
2022	Jack N' Jill	Malayalam	No	Yes		
2022	Pakka Commercial	Telugu	Yes	Yes		
2022	Kaduva	Malayalam	Yes	Yes		
2022	Paappan	Malayalam	Yes	Yes		
2022	Oke Oka Jeevitham	Telugu	Yes	Yes		
2022	Kanam	Tamil	Yes	Yes		
2022	Kotthu	Malayalam	No	Yes		
2022	Kumari	Malayalam	Yes	Yes	Also one of the producers	
2022	Saturday Night	Malayalam	Yes	Yes		
2022	Aanaparambile WorldCup	Malayalam	Yes	Yes		
2022	Kaapa	Malayalam	Yes	Yes	1 song	
2023	Iratta	Malayalam	Yes	Yes		
2023	Ayalvaashi	Malayalam	Yes	Yes		
2023	Por Thozhil	Tamil	No	Yes	The film has no songs.	
2023	Padmini	Malayalam	Yes	Yes		
2023	King of Kotha	Malayalam	Yes	Yes		
2023	Garudan	Malayalam	Yes	Yes		
2023	Antony	Malayalam	Yes	Yes		
2024	Malayalee from India	Malayalam	Yes	Yes		
2024	Secret	Malayalam	Yes	Yes		
2024	Saripodhaa Sanivaaram	Telugu	Yes	Yes		
2024	Adios Amigo	Malayalam	Yes	Yes		
2024	Nirangal Moondru	Tamil	Yes	Yes		
2024	Mechanic Rocky	Telugu	Yes	Yes		
2024	Hello Mummy	Malayalam	Yes	Yes		
2025	Identity	Malayalam	Yes	Yes		
2025	Deva	Hindi	Yes	Yes		
2025	Officer on Duty	Malayalam	Yes	Yes		
2025	Thudarum	Malayalam	Yes	Yes		
2025	Narivetta	Malayalam	Yes	Yes		
2025	Lokah Chapter 1: Chandra	Malayalam	Yes	Yes		
2025	Paathirathri	Malayalam	Yes	Yes		
2025	Kaantha	Tamil	No	Yes		
2025	Vilayath Buddha	Malayalam	Yes	Yes		
2026	Pallichattambi	Malayalam	Yes	Yes		
2026	Mollywood Times	Malayalam	Yes	Yes		
2026	I, Nobody	Malayalam	Yes	Yes		
2026	Thudakkam	Malayalam	Yes	Yes		
2026	Khalifa	Malayalam	Yes	Yes		
2026	I'm Game	Malayalam	Yes	Yes		
2026	Hail Mary †	Malayalam	Yes	Yes		
2026	Mysaa †	Telugu	Yes	Yes		
2026	Athimanoharam †	Malayalam	Yes	Yes		
TBA	Avaran †	Malayalam	Yes	Yes		
TBA	Operation Cambodia †	Malayalam	Yes	Yes		
TBA	Lokah: Chapter 2 †	Malayalam	Yes	Yes		
TBA	KH 237 †	Tamil	Yes	Yes		
