= Mannar Vagaiyara =

- Theatrical release poster
- Directed by: G. Boopathy Pandian
- Written by: G. Boopathy Pandian
- Produced by: Vimal
- Starring: Vimal; Anandhi
- Cinematography: P. G. Muthiah; Sooraj Nallusami
- Edited by: Gopi Krishna
- Music by: Jakes Bejoy
- Production company: A3V Cinemaz
- Release date: 26 January 2018
- Country: India
- Language: Tamil

Mannar Vagaiyara (transl. Rulers Clan) is a 2018 Indian Tamil-language action comedy film written and directed by G. Boopathy Pandian. The film is produced by actor Vimal, who also stars alongside Anandhi, while Prabhu, Saranya Ponvannan, Chandini Tamilarasan and Karthik Kumar among others appear in supporting roles. Featuring music composed by Jakes Bejoy and cinematography by P. G. Muthiah and Sooraj Nallusami, the film was released on 26 January 2018.

== Plot ==
Govindaraja Mooriyar is a respected person in a town living with his wife and two sons – Arivazhagan and Madhi. Ilayarani also hails from a nearby town and lives with her parents Rajangam, and Kalaiyarasi as well as her elder sister Selvarani and her elder brother JP. Madhi falls in love with Ilayarani which she reciprocates.

Karunakaran is a local business man and a relative of Rajangam, however, enmity prevails between both families. Kalaiyarasi plans to unite both families by getting Selvarani married to Karunakaran's brother. To everyone's surprise, Selvarani elopes on the day of her wedding along with Arivazhagan with the help of Madhi. It is revealed that Selvarani and Arivazhagan are in love. Knowing this, both families disown the couple forcing them to stay alone on the outskirts of town with the help of Madhi. Selvarani is conceived and Madhi convinces both his and Selvarani's families that they are united.

Karunakaran suggests his brother to be married to Ilayarani to which everyone agrees. Govindaraj learns of Madhi and Ilayarani's love affair and is infuriated. Madhi decides to sacrifice his love so that Rajangam and Karunakaran's families can be united. Madhi promises Govindaraj that he will move away from Ilayarani's life. On the day of Ilayarani's wedding, she goes missing and Govindaraj doubts Madhi as he has planned something. However, Madhi denies any wrongdoing but everyone in the marriage hall learns of the love between Madhi and Ilayarani.

Finally, it is found that Ilayarani is still staying at her house and calls Rajangam and JP requesting to cancel the wedding as she is not interested in it. Everyone decides to get Ilayarani married to Madhi and they are united at the end. Madhi feels sorry for Karunakaran's brother as his wedding is cancelled twice because of him and gets him married to another girl.

== Cast ==
- Vimal as Madhiyazhagan Mooriyar Thevar
- Anandhi as llaiyarani
- Prabhu as Govindaraja Mooriyar Thevar, Madhiyazhagan's father
- Saranya Ponvannan as Kalaiyarasi, Ilaiyarani's mother
- Chandini Tamilarasan as Selvarani Arivazhagan
- Robo Shankar as Attack Durai
- Karthik Kumar as Arivazhagan Mooriyar Thevar
- Meera Krishnan as Kamatchi, Madhi and Arivu's mother
- Jayaprakash as Rajangam Ilaiyarani's father
- Singampuli as Puli Mootta
- Vamsi Krishna as JP Vandayar Thevar, Ilaiyarani's brother
- Neelima Rani as Easwari JP
- Abhishek Vinod as Karunakaran vandayar
- Rethika Srinivas as Karunakaran's wife
- Sathya SK as Karunakaran's brother
- Sangili Murugan as Sangili Thatha
- Karate Raja as JP's henchman
- Swaminathan as Priest
- Bharathi Kannan
- Vichu Vishwanath
- Singamuthu
- Sai Dheena
- T. P. Radhamani Grandmother, Rajangam's mother
- Madhurai Raja
- Ilamparithi
- Supergood Subramani
- Yogi Babu as Kannan (special appearance)
- Maria Juliana in a guest appearance

== Production ==
Production began in December 2015. It was produced by the lead actor Vimal through his newly launched company A3V Cinemaz. He thus chose to prioritise the production of Mannar Vagaiyara and opted against working on other projects simultaneously. Soori was supposed to act in the film, but his busy schedule meant that Robo Shankar later took the role, and parodied Dhanush's character in Maari (2015) as a part of his character.

== Soundtrack ==
Mannar Vagaiyara

Soundtrack album by Jakes Bejoy
- Released: 3 January 2018
- Genre: Film soundtrack
- Length: 22:08
- Label: New Music
- Producer: Jakes Bejoy

Jakes Bejoy chronology
Queen (2018)	Mannar Vagaiyara (2018)	Swathandriam Ardharathriyil (2018)
External audio
- Audio Jukebox on YouTube

The film's music was composed by Jakes Bejoy, and the soundtrack was released on 3 January 2018.

Track listing
No.	Title	Lyrics	Singer(s)	Length
1.	"Ada Ada"	Sarathi	Madhu Balakrishnan	3:02
2.	"Annana Pathi"	Boopathy Pandian	Remya Nambeesan, Renjith, Inzamam-Ul-Huq	3:57
3.	"Mama Mama"	Mani Amudhavan	Mukesh	4:13
4.	"Mannar Mannar"	Sarathi	Ananthu, Velmurugan, Kavitha Gopi	4:20
5.	"Oru Thattane Pole"	Mani Amuthavan	Sathyaprakash Dharmar, Vandana Srinivasan	4:20
6.	"Vanna Vanna"	Mani Amuthavan	Keshav Vinod, Deepika	2:16
Total length:				22:08

== Release ==
Mannar Vagaiyara was planned to release for the Pongal season of mid-January 2018, but were forced to delay due to a lack of screens. Eventually, it was released on 26 January the same month.

== Reception ==
Thinkal Menon of The Times of India wrote, "With a slew of characters, each of them having adequate screen space, Mannar Vahaiyara works to a good extent, thanks to decent humour and engaging emotional sequences, which strike the right chord. The film which starts off as an OKish one, but pleasantly turns into an entertaining fare as it progresses". Gopinath Rajendran of Cinema Express wrote that "though the film's been in the making for two years, nothing about it feels irrelevant or outdated either. On the whole Mannar Vagaiyara is a mediocre entertainer that might appeal a lot more to the B and C centres". Sify wrote, "Overall, Mannar Vagaiyara is neither good to appreciate nor bad to ignore. If you are a fan of Vemal's hit rural films, you might end up finding Mannar Vagaiyara a watchable flick".
