= Maari (film) =

2015 Indian film by Balaji Mohan

- Theatrical release poster
- Directed by: Balaji Mohan
- Written by: Balaji Mohan
- Produced by: Listin Stephen; Radhika Sarathkumar; R. Sarathkumar; Dhanush
- Starring: Dhanush; Kajal Aggarwal; Vijay Yesudas
- Cinematography: Om Prakash
- Edited by: Prasanna GK
- Music by: Anirudh Ravichander
- Production companies: Wunderbar Films; Magic Frames
- Distributed by: Magic Frames
- Release date: 17 July 2015
- Running time: 138 minutes
- Country: India
- Language: Tamil

Maari is a 2015 Indian Tamil-language action crime comedy film written and directed by Balaji Mohan, jointly produced by Listin Stephen's Magic Frames and Dhanush's Wunderbar Films. The film stars Dhanush and Kajal Aggarwal, while Vijay Yesudas, Robo Shankar, Kalloori Vinoth, Kaali Venkat, and Mime Gopi play supporting roles. Dhanush plays Maari, a local gangster. This film also marks Vijay Yesudas's Tamil debut as an actor.

Anirudh Ravichander composed the film's soundtrack and score while Om Prakash and Prasanna G. K. undertook the film's cinematography and editing respectively. After being in pre-production phase since March 2014, principal photography began on 5 November 2014 and lasted till 15 March 2015. The film was released on 17 July 2015 to mixed reviews and performed well at the box office. A sequel titled Maari 2 was released on 21 December 2018.

== Plot ==
Police Constable Arumugam talks to the new Sub-Inspector, Arjun, about Maari, a local rowdy who rose to fame after killing a rival rowdy, Pandi. He wants to get evidence that Maari murdered Pandi so that he can put Maari behind bars. Maari is an irritating guy who, along with his henchmen Sanikilamai and Adithangi, constantly pesters the people in the area and extorts money from them. His main line of work is training racing pigeons. His boss is Velu, a don also involved in pigeon races and sandalwood smuggling.

Maari constantly fights with "Bird" Ravi, another local rowdy who also works under Velu. One day, a lady named Sridevi enters the business, trying to open a boutique in Maari's area, and Maari forcefully becomes her partner in the shop. He angers her after she loses a couple's order after Maari purposely increases their bill. Soon after, he starts to annoy one of her customers. She goes to the police station and decides to help Arjun catch Maari by getting close to him, pretending to fall in love with him, and incriminating him with evidence of his confession. He had tried to kill the rival rowdy but failed. She shoots the talk with Maari in a drunken state, who describes the murder. Eight years ago, Pandi killed one of Maari's pigeons, and Maari stabbed Pandi, who was later killed by somebody else, for which Maari took credit. The next morning, Arjun arrests Maari.

Seven months later, when Maari is released, he discovers that the police also arrested Velu for sandalwood smuggling. The people discover that Arjun is a corrupt cop, and he and Ravi work together and have arrested some people in the area under the pretext of smuggling to extort money and send them to prison. Maari decides to take revenge on the duo. He first frees the local people from the extortion by Ravi's gang, while Sridevi apologizes to him and falls in love with him for real. Sanikilamai tells Sridevi that Maari loved and cared for his pigeons since no one cared for him.

Later, Maari captures one of Arjun's smuggling vehicles and the driver, forcing Arjun to release Velu. Also, the people arrested for removing sandalwood get released, and the people respect Maari. When Arjun takes revenge by burning Maari's pigeon coop, which kills 10 of his pigeons, he gets angry. He goes to Arjun's sandalwood place and beats up Arjun, Ravi, and their henchmen. Ravi agrees to confess everything. Angered, Arjun stabs Ravi but is eventually arrested by the Revenue Department after Aarumugam reveals Arjun's secrets to them. Finally, Sridevi approaches Maari to confess her love, but he rejects it and returns to pestering the local people and extorting them for cash.

== Cast ==
- Dhanush as Maari
- Kajal Aggarwal as Sridevi
- Vijay Yesudas as Inspector Arjun Kumar
- Robo Shankar as Sanikilamai
- Kalloori Vinoth as Robert (Adithangi)
- Kaali Venkat as Constable Aarumugam
- Shanmugarajan as Velu Anna
- Mime Gopi as "Bird" Ravi
- Supergood Subramani as TV Shop Owner
- Sriranjani as Sridevi's mother
- Sampath Ram as Pandi
- Chelladurai as Maari's supporter
- Azhagu as Anbu
- Raja Rani Pandian as Officer at Chennai Homing Pigeon Fanciers Club
- George Vijay Nelson as Ravi's henchman
- Sharath Ravi as Villager
- Anirudh Ravichander as himself in the song "Maari Thara Local" (Guest appearance)
- Baba Bhaskar (special appearance in the song "Maari Thara Local")
- Balaji Mohan as himself (cameo appearance)

== Production ==
The collaboration between Listin Stephen and Radhika's production house and director Balaji Mohan was first revealed in early January 2014, with Dhanush and Kajal Aggarwal being signed on to be a part of the "romantic entertainer". The first look poster released later indicated that Dhanush was a co-producer of the film. Balaji Mohan wanted the film not to be a bilingual like his previous ventures as he found it difficult to shoot the same shot twice and to retain the same energy in both of them. He said in an interview in March 2014 that he narrated a one-liner to Dhanush, on whose consent, he would develop the complete script after releasing Vaayai Moodi Pesavum (2014), adding that this film would "definitely not be a love story". Dhanush said in early August 2014 that the project was in pre-production. Anirudh Ravichander was selected as the film's music director, marking his fifth collaboration with Wunderbar Films. Prasanna, an assistant of A. Sreekar Prasad, was signed in on as the film's editor while Om Prakash undertook the cinematography. R. K. Vijay Murugan was signed in on as the film's art director. On 7 November 2014, Mohan announced that the film was titled Maari.

Sources close to the film's unit said that Dhanush would be seen as a local slum chieftain for which he had to speak in a Madras accent. Aggarwal, who was supposed to work with Dhanush in Polladhavan (2007), was cast on Dhanush's insistence, who wanted to gain a foothold in Telugu cinema by cashing in on Aggarwal's stardom there. She said in an interview that she overcame her fear of birds due to her experiences with pigeons during the film's shoot. Although Aggarwal was signed during the film's initial stages of production, she joined the sets in November 2014. Robo Shankar, one of the cast of Vaayai Moodi Pesavum, was signed in on for an important role. Playback singer Vijay Yesudas joined the team in December 2014, making his debut as an actor in Tamil cinema. He stated in late February 2015 that he would play the role of a police officer. Anirudh made a cameo appearance in the film and joined its sets in mid March 2015.

Principal photography began on 4 November 2014 at T. Nagar in Chennai. The film's second schedule began on 25 November 2014. Dhanush confirmed the completion of principal photography on 15 March 2015 through his Twitter page.

== Soundtrack ==
The soundtrack album was composed by Anirudh Ravichander, with lyrics written by Dhanush, Vignesh Shivan and G. Rokesh. The film marks the third collaboration between Dhanush and Anirudh Ravichander. The album was released on 7 June 2015 through the Sony Music record label.

== Release ==
Maari was released in theatres on 17 July 2015. Its television premiere took place on Star Vijay on 10 November 2015, during Diwali.

== Reception ==
=== Critical reception ===
Maari received mixed reviews from critics.

Baradwaj Rangan wrote for The Hindu, "Save for the bits with Robo Shankar, the writing is shockingly ordinary — lots of tells, very little show...Does making a mass movie mean that you forget to make an interesting one?" The Times of India gave 2 out of 5 and wrote, "If you, like many others, had been excited about Maari after watching its trailer, be prepared for disappointment. Almost all the worst bits from the film are already in the trailer and the film clearly lacks the crackling energy that we see in the trailer. Maari largely feels like one huge build-up without any proper pay-off". NDTV wrote, "A couple of mass moments and some quirky humor apart, there's nothing in Maari to justify the much-anticipated Balaji Mohan- Dhanush collaboration". Indo-Asian News Service wrote, "the director isn't capable of delivering a wholesome commercial entertainer with some story, some heroism and some cliches a la Dhanush's recent blockbuster Vella Illa Pattathari. Except for the story, we get everything else from Maari, and that's the smallest concern of the movie", with the critic adding that "Dhanush saves a very ordinary film".

Rediff.com gave 0.5 out of 5 and wrote, "Uninspiring and predictable, director Balaji Mohan's Maari is just another mass masala movie created to idolise its hero". The New Indian Express wrote, "The director's attempt to go 'commercial' this time, concentrating more on his hero than the script, backfires. The film gives a sense of Deja vu throughout, the real interesting moments very few and far between", calling the film "a painless tedious experience, meant for hardcore Dhanush fans". Sify gave 1 out of 5 by saying Director Balaji Mohan has made the film with childish punch dialogues, slow-motion shots and an adrenaline flawless background score by Anirudh. It is a film that makes no bones, no pretenses about the fact that it is packaged for E audiences.

=== Box office ===
Despite the release of Baahubali: The Beginning, Maari collected ₹20.1 crore (equivalent to ₹33 crore or US$3.4 million in 2026) in its opening weekend, the highest for a Dhanush film to that point. A week later, it reportedly grossed ₹50 crore (equivalent to ₹82 crore or US$8.6 million in 2026).

=== Accolades ===
Awards	Date of ceremony (Note: Date is linked to the article about the awards held that year, wherever possible.)	Category	Recipient(s) and nominee(s)	Result	Ref.
Edison Awards	14 February 2016	Best Mass Hero	Dhanush	Won	
Filmfare Awards South	18 June 2016	Best Music Director – Tamil	Anirudh Ravichander	Nominated	
IIFA Utsavam	24–25 January 2016	Performance in a Comic Role – Tamil	Robo Shankar	Nominated	
IIFA Utsavam	24–25 January 2016	Best Music Director – Tamil	Anirudh Ravichander	Nominated	
IIFA Utsavam	24–25 January 2016	Best Lyricist – Tamil	Dhanush – ("Don'u Don'u Don'u")	Won	
IIFA Utsavam	24–25 January 2016	Best Male Playback Singer – Tamil	Anirudh Ravichander – ("Don'u Don'u Don'u")	Nominated	
South Indian International Movie Awards	30 June–1 July 2016	Best Actor in a Negative Role – Tamil	Vijay Yesudas	Nominated	

== Controversies ==
Former health minister and politician Anbumani Ramadoss, criticised Dhanush for portraying on-screen smoking in this film. Replying to this Dhanush, in an interview, stated "It is a call taken by the director of the film. The script and my character of a local thug demanded such a sequence in the film. But in real life, I don't smoke. And I request my fans to take that as inspiration and not to smoke, and give up smoking if they are smokers."

== Sequel ==
A sequel titled Maari 2, again directed by Balaji Mohan and starring Dhanush, was released on 21 December 2018.

== Legacy ==
The glasses used by Dhanush in Maari is a single original piece. There is only one piece of the exact specification of roundness and measurement, and no duplicate or spare version of the glasses exists. The makers of Maari carefully preserved the glasses for use in its sequel. The outfits worn by Dhanush in this film became popular after its release. Robo Shankar parodied Dhanush's character in the film Mannar Vagaiyara (2018).
