= Deira Diaries =

- Directed by: Mushtaque Rahman kariyaden
- Screenplay by: Mushtaque Rahman kariyaden
- Produced by: Madhu karuvath
- Starring: Abu Valayamkulam; Shalu Rahim; Arfaz Iqbal; Roni Abraham; Sanju Philips; Naveen illath; Ben Sebastian; Sangithaa Bijesh; Bindu Sanjeev; Letha Das; Reju Antony Gabriel
- Cinematography: Deen kamar
- Edited by: Naveen P Vijayan
- Music by: Sibu Sukumaran
- Production companies: MJS Media; Forever Friends
- Release date: 19 March 2021
- Running time: 128 minutes
- Country: India
- Language: Malayalam

Deira Diaries is a 2021 Indian Malayalam-language drama film written and directed by Mushtaque Rahman kariyaden. The film was directly released on NeeStream, a Malayalam OTT platform on 19 March 2021.

== Plot ==
Film tells the story of a 60-year-old Malayali who spent four decades as an expatriate in the Gulf and the direct and indirect influence he has had on different individuals. It is said to be distinct from the usual Gulf-based dramas made in Malayalam.

== Cast ==
- Abu Valayamkulam as Yousef
- Shalu Rahim
- Arfaz Iqbal as Shanu
- Roni Abraham
- Sanju Philips
- Naveen Illath
- Roopesh Tellicherry
- Ben Sebastian
- Bindu Sanjeev
- Sangithaa Bijesh
- Reju Antony Gabriel

== Music ==
The film music and score were composed by Sibu Sukumaran.The song "Minnaninja Rave" sung by Najim Arshad and Aavani Malhar, was uploaded on 22 August 2020 on Smart4music YouTube as part of the promotions.

No.	Title	Lyrics	Singer(s)	Length
1.	"MINNANINJA RAVE "മിന്നണിഞ്ഞ രാവേ""	Joe Paul	Najim Arshad	4:17
2.	"SAAYANNA MEGHAM "സായാഹ്ന മേഘം""	Joe Paul	Vijay Yesudas	3:21
3.	"SHARARANTHALE "ശരറാന്തലെ""	Joe Paul	K. S. Harisankar	4:38
Total length:				12:16
