= Aviyal (2022 film) =

- Theatrical release poster
- Directed by: Shanil
- Written by: Shanil
- Produced by: Sujith Surendran
- Starring: Joju George; Anaswara Rajan; Sirajudeen Nazir; Ketaki Narayan; Anjali Nair; Sanju Sanichen; Shravan Satya; Dain Davis; Athmiya Rajan; Prasanth Alexander
- Cinematography: Ravi K. Chandran; Sudeep Elamon; Jimshi Khalid; Gikku Jacob Peter
- Edited by: Rahman Muhammed Ali; Lijo Paul
- Music by: Shankar Sharma; Sharreth
- Production company: Pocket SQ2 Productions
- Distributed by: Pocket SQ2 Productions
- Release date: 7 April 2022
- Running time: 125 minutes
- Country: India
- Language: Malayalam

Aviyal is a 2022 Indian Malayalam-language film, written and directed by Shanil, who had earlier co-directed Philips and the Monkey Pen along with Rojin Thomas. The film produced by Sujith Surendran, starring Joju George and Anaswara Rajan in lead roles of father and daughter respectively was released with mixed reviews.

Actor Sirajudeen Nazir plays the central character and the film was shot for a period of over two years, as the actors had to alter their physical appearance.

== Premise ==
Aviyal tells the story of Krishnan, a music-obsessed man born in Kannur and his four stages—childhood, adolescence, youth and old age of life.

== Cast ==
- Joju George as Krishnan
- Sirajudeen Nazir as Young Krishnan
- Armaan Mistry
- Anaswara Rajan as Ammukutty
- Alexander Prasanth as Sebastian
- Ketaki Narayan
- Athmiya Rajan as Nithula
- Anjali Nair
- Dain Davis
- Sanju Sanichen
- Shravan Satya
- Swathi
- Prasanth Alexander
- Shafeer Khan
- Shivadas
- Unni Shivapal
- Vishnu_Govindan
- Zinil Zainudeen
- Subeesh Sudhi

== Production ==
Director Shanil, who had earlier co-directed Philips and the Monkey Pen was supported by the producer Sujith Surendran for the coming of age film, his third directorial. Actors Joju George and Anaswara Rajan were signed to play the lead roles. The principal photography began on 14 January 2020, but the film was shot for a period of over 2 years as the film makers wanted the actors to alter their physical appearance according to their respective characters. Cinematographers Sudeep Elamon, Jimshi Khalid, Ravi K. Chandran and Gikku Jacob Peter worked in each schedule at different locations of Kannur, Goa and Kodaikanal.

== Release ==
After multiple postponements, the film was released on 7 April 2022. The film was digitally released on Amazon prime on 20 May 2022.

== Critical response ==
S. R. Praveen of The Hindu mentioned that the director wrote some convincing initial portions, but makes a patchy final product. Deepa Soman of The Times of India rated the film with 3 out of 5 stars, stating that the film was shot over a few years, deserves appreciation for the rarely attempted, but patience-testing method of filmmaking, that makes the narration close to ordinary life, due to the sheer passage of time captured in the film. Sajin Shrijith of Cinema Express rated the film with 2.5 out of 5 stars, stated that the film has an excellent first half, but a huge let down by some familiar and predictable scenes later on. The News Minute rated the film with 2.5 out of 5 stars, wrote that the film, though appreciable in parts, has a lot to patch up in storytelling, performances and music, that is often irritating.
