= Identity (2025 film) =

2025 Indian film

- Theatrical release poster
- Directed by: Akhil Paul; Anas Khan
- Written by: Akhil Paul; Anas Khan
- Produced by: Raju Malliath; CJ Roy
- Starring: Tovino Thomas; Trisha Krishnan; Vinay Rai
- Cinematography: Akhil George
- Edited by: Chaman Chakko
- Music by: Jakes Bejoy
- Production companies: Ragam Movies; Confident Group
- Distributed by: Sree Gokulam Movies
- Release date: 2 January 2025
- Running time: 158 minutes
- Country: India
- Language: Malayalam
- Budget: ₹12 crore
- Box office: ₹18 crore

Identity is a 2025 Indian Malayalam-language action thriller film written and directed by Akhil Paul and Anas Khan. It is produced by Confident Group and Ragam Movies. The film stars Tovino Thomas, Trisha Krishnan and Vinay Rai.

The film was officially announced on 25 November 2022. Principal photography commenced on 12 September 2023, in Goa. The soundtrack and score was composed by Jakes Bejoy. It was released on 2 January 2025 and received mixed reviews from critics.

== Plot ==
Amar Felix, an employee at a clothing store, secretly records a woman in a changing room and blackmails her for money. He has carried out similar schemes with other women, blackmailing them or their relatives, and operates from an abandoned clothing warehouse he owns. One day, a mysterious individual enters the warehouse, kills Amar, and burns it down along with his body.

Weeks later, DYSP Dineshan is contacted by Malayali-Tamil CI Allen Jacob of the Karnataka Police, who has been assigned to investigate Amar's murder. Allen reveals he has an eyewitness, Alisha, whose identity is being protected and is called Ann for the investigation. Ann, who has a photographic memory, claims she can identify the killer. Dineshan offers them a safe house in his building, where Haran Shankar, a part-time karate instructor with OCPD caused by an abusive father, lives with his sister Devika and half-sister Neerja.

During a scooter theft incident in the neighborhood, Haran demonstrates his sketching skills, learned from his late mother, a police sketch artist. Impressed, Allen asks Haran to sketch the killer based on Ann's description. Ann's first description unexpectedly matches Haran's face, raising Allen's suspicions. However, when Haran creates a second sketch at the crime scene, it produces a different face, which Ann confirms as the killer.

A lookout notice is issued, but it is revealed that Haran is, in fact, the one who killed Amar. Realizing his identity might be compromised, Haran attempts to break into Ann's house but is caught by his uncle Sudarshan, a doctor. Ann holds them at gunpoint, and Sudarshan realizes that Ann cannot recognize faces and her memory is unreliable. Allen arrives and addresses Ann as Alisha.

Four weeks earlier, Alisha Abdul Samad, a news presenter, had been informed by Nakul, a hacker, about Amar's crimes. Seeking to expose him, she secretly entered Amar's warehouse but was caught in the fire set by Haran and fled, only to be struck by a truck, leading to her developing prosopagnosia.

Allen attempts to arrest Haran, but another man, Ameer Ali, surrenders and confesses, clearing Haran's name. However, Haran later reveals to Alisha that he killed Amar after discovering that Amar had raped his sister Neerja and her friend Sakina. Haran had remained silent until Sakina's brother Ansar, blackmailed by Amar, sought his help. Furious, Haran killed Amar and Ansar's father, who turned out to be Ameer, vowed to protect Ansar.

The next day, Allen disappears. Haran realizes Allen is after Amar's hard drive, which contains incriminating videos. Allen attacks Haran and Alisha during a car chase, stealing Haran's disguise to approach Dineshan. Allen kills Dineshan to retrieve the hard drive, but Alisha mistakenly believes Haran is responsible. Two days later, Haran proves his innocence to her. Allen's backstory reveals he is a suspended officer who exploited the Witness Protection Scheme to sell new identities to criminals, including business magnate Chinappa. In one instance, he sold the identity of Chitrammal, a journalist's widow, to Chinappa, who tried to kill her. To silence Chithrammal permanently, Allen hired Amar to blackmail Ansar into facilitating her murder during a flight to Bangalore. Amar, however, abducted Neerja and Sakina for his own schemes, setting off the chain of events.

Allen holds Devika and Neerja hostage at Devika's hospital headquarters while the police question Sudarshan about Haran's past. It is revealed that Haran is actually a former NSG commando and an active Sky Marshal. Haran boards Chitrammal's flight and, with Nakul and Alisha's help, discovers that seven other witnesses are onboard whose identities Allen had sold. Allen plans to crash the flight with the help of a blackmailed air traffic controller. Haran disables the flight's transponder, averting the crash thereby saving the lives of numerous passengers on board, but Allen manages to escape easily. However, he loses his hard drive after being exposed to the radiation of an MRI room.

Weeks later, Allen attempts to flee on a private jet. Haran, assigned as the Sky Marshal for the flight, confronts him mid-air. In a final fight, Haran kills Allen and his bodyguards, avenging Dinesh's death and thereby ending his criminal enterprise, ensuring justice for all the victims.

== Cast ==
- Tovino Thomas as Haran Shankar, a Sky Marshal and former NSG Commando from the Ministry of Home Affairs
  - Izin Hash as Young Haran
- Trisha Krishnan as Alisha Abdul Salam / Ann (voiceover by Anne Amie)
- Vinay Rai as Ex CI Allen Jacob, Karnataka Police
- Aju Varghese as DYSP Dinesh Chandran
- Shammi Thilakan as Dr. Sudharshan, Haran's uncle
- Adithya Menon as Raghunath Chinappa, Business Tycoon
- Vishak Nair as Nakul Sachdev
- Archana Kavi as Dr. Devika Shankar, Haran's elder sister
- Gopika Ramesh as Neerja Sudip, Haran's stepsister
- Sujith Shankar as ATCO Sudev Anand
- Arjun Radhakrishnan as Amar Felix
- Rahul Rajagopal as CAS Raveendran
- Dhruvan as Deepak John, Haran's subordinate
- Giju John as Rohan Raphael
- Major Ravi as Chief Siddhayya
- Asha Madathil as Chithrammal
- Mandira Bedi as Supriya Gopal
- Arya as Latha Dinesh, Dinesh's wife
- Assim Jamal as Ameer Ali
- Krishna Vijayachandran as Ansar Ali
- Mahima Radhakrishnan as Sakina Ali
- Aparna Mulberry as News Reporter
- Nilja K Baby as Emy John
- Gilu Joseph as Smitha Shankar
- Shinu Shyamalan as Dr. Anitha
- Litty Thomas as Niveditha
- Sethu Lekshmi as Natasha
- Vriddhi Vishal as Athira
- Raja Rani Pandian as SP Ramamurthy IPS
- Mohan Thankam as ASI Johny
- Adam Sabiq as Pilot
- Swathidas as Pushpanath
- Sreerang as Ashwin
- Chikku as Amar's boy who snatches phone
- Akhil Paul as Flight Passenger
- Anas Khan as Flight Passenger

== Production ==
=== Casting ===
Tovino Thomas was cast in the lead role, marking his second collaboration with Anas Khan and Akhil Paul after Forensic. Trisha and Vinay Rai were also cast in prominent roles.

=== Filming ===
Principal photography commenced in September 2023 in Goa. Trisha joined filming in December 2023. Filming took place across Rajasthan, Kochi, Chennai, Thrissur, Erode, Bangalore and Thiruvananthapuram Filming was concluded in July 2024.

=== Marketing ===
On 30 June 2023, Identity was officially announced with a title poster featuring Tovino Thomas in the lead role. After filming commenced, the production team confirmed that Trisha would be playing the female lead. The complete cast was later revealed through a series of promotional posters. Marketing for the film began in early October 2024, with ongoing promotional activities leading up to the release.

== Music ==
The music and original background score for Identity were composed by Jakes Bejoy.

Identity

Soundtrack album by Jakes Bejoy
- Released: 19 December 2024
- Genre: Feature film soundtrack
- Length: 14:18
- Language: Malayalam
- Label: Sony Music

Track listing

No.	Title	Lyrics	Singer(s)	Length
1.	"Cyclone Central"	Muhsin Parari	Yazin Naizar, Reyan, Melvin	3:44
2.	"Bhoologam Sundaram"	Rajat Prakash	Rajat Prakash, Rehna Shaz	3:13
3.	"Thalarathe"	Anwar Ali	Sreekanth Hariharan	3:11
4.	"Spirit of Haran - Teaser Theme"		Instrumental	1:38
5.	"Call of the Skies - Trailer Theme"		Instrumental	2:30
Total length:				14:18

== Release ==
=== Theatrical ===
Identity was released theatrically on 2 January 2025.

=== Home media ===
The digital streaming rights of the film were acquired by ZEE5, and it started streaming in Malayalam, Tamil, Kannada and Telugu from 31 January 2025. The film is soon to be released with a dubbed version in Hindi which will be available to watch on Ultra Play app.

== Reception ==
=== Critical response ===
The film received mixed reviews from critics. The Indian Express gave the film 2 out of 5 stars, saying that "Tovino Thomas, Trisha's action thriller is high on style but low on substance." Times of India gave the film 2.5 out of 5 stars and wrote that "Too many twists spoil the plot". India Today gave the film 3 out of 5 stars and wrote that "Tovino Thomas, Trisha's thriller is engaging albeit convenient." The Hindu wrote that "Tovino Thomas-Trisha Krishnan investigate thriller gets lost in a convoluted plotline." News18 gave the film 3 out of 5 stars and wrote that "Trisha and Tovino Thomas' thriller is engaging but wants to be many things at once." Sajin Shrijith of The Week gave the film a rating of 2.5 out of 5 stars and called it a "largely insipid thriller with an exciting third act."

=== Box office ===
The film concluded its run with a worldwide gross estimated to be ₹18 crore.
