= Anveshanam =

2020 film directed by Prasobh Vijayan

Anveshannam
- Theatrical release poster
- Directed by: Prasobh Vijayan
- Written by: Francis Thomas; Ranjeet Kamala Sarkar; Salil V.
- Produced by: A.V. Anoop; Mukesh R. Mehta; C. V. Sarathi
- Starring: Jayasurya; Shruti Ramachandran; Leona Lishoy; Vijay Babu
- Cinematography: Sujith Vaassudev
- Edited by: Appu N. Bhattathiri
- Music by: Jakes Bejoy
- Production company: E4 Entertainment
- Distributed by: AVA Productions
- Release date: 31 January 2020
- Running time: 102 minutes
- Country: India
- Language: Malayalam

Anveshanam (transl. Investigation) is a 2020 Indian Malayalam-language mystery thriller film directed by Prasobh Vijayan and produced by E4 Entertainment. The film stars Jayasurya, Shruthi Ramachandran, Vijay Babu, and Leona Lishoy. It was released on 31 January 2020.

== Synopsis ==
Aravind is informed that something unexpected has happened to his family and has to reach the hospital immediately. What awaits him comes as a shock as he is soon sucked into a miasma of questions that he has to fight to find the answers.

== Cast ==
- Jayasurya as Aravind
- Shruti Ramachandran as Kavitha Aravind
- Vijay Babu as Dr. Gautham
- Leona Lishoy as ACP Latha Siddarth IPS
- Nandu as Alphonse
- Lal as Dr. Fariz
- Lena as Sister Sony Cherian
- Srikant Murali as Dr. Ashok
- Jai Vishnu as Sarath
- Shaju K. S. as Sethunath
- Jess Sweejan as Mishka

== Music ==
The film's music was composed by Jakes Bejoy.

No.	Title	Singer	Lyricist
1	Ilam Poove Ennum	Sooraj Santhosh	Joe Paul
