= 2 States (2020 film) =

2020 Indian Malayalam-language film

- Film poster
- Directed by: Jacky S. Kumar
- Written by: Jacky S. Kumar
- Produced by: Sulfikar Kaleel; Naufal M. Thameem
- Starring: Manu Pillai; Sharanya R Nair; Mukesh; Vijayaraghavan
- Cinematography: Sanjay Harris; Prasanth Krishna
- Edited by: Sagar Das
- Music by: Jakes Bejoy
- Release date: 6 March 2020
- Country: India
- Language: Malayalam

2 States is a 2020 Indian Mayalam-language romantic comedy film directed and written by Jacky S. Kumar. It stars Manu Pillai, Sharanya R Nair, Mukesh, and Vijayaraghavan.

== Cast ==
- Manu Pillai as Harikrishnan
- Sharanya R Nair as Sushitha
- Mukesh as Vijayaraghavan
- Vijayaraghavan as Appappan
- Aroul D. Shankar as Sushitha's father
- Shammi Thilakan as the nervous goon
- Pradeep Kottayam
- Vinod Kedamangalam
- John Vijay as Police Officer
- Unni Nair
- Santhosh Keezhattoor
- Indrans as Judge (cameo appearance)

== Release ==
The film was set to release on Valentine's Day, but was postponed to 28 February.

The Times of India gave the film two-and-half out of five stars and stated that " The progression of the story is more or less predictable, except for a suspense element towards the end".
