= Enthada Saji =

- Theatrical release poster
- Directed by: Godfy Xavier Babu
- Written by: Godfy Xavier Babu
- Produced by: Listin Stephen
- Starring: Kunchacko Boban; Nivetha Thomas; Jayasurya
- Cinematography: Jithu Damodar
- Edited by: Ratheesh Raj
- Music by: William Francis
- Production company: Magic Frames
- Release date: 8 April 2023
- Running time: 123 minutes
- Country: India
- Language: Malayalam

Enthada Saji (transl. What is it, Saji) is a 2023 Indian Malayalam-language fantasy comedy film written and directed by Godfy Xavier Babu. The film features Kunchacko Boban, Nivetha Thomas in the title role, and Jayasurya in leading roles. It is produced by Listin Stephen under the banner of Magic Frames. This film marks Nivetha Thomas' return to Malayalam cinema after a 9-year hiatus.

== Plot ==
Sajimol is a lazy and spoiled young woman often teased about her single status. One day, after praying in the chapel, she hears the voice of Saint Roch and talks to him through his statue. She requests a personal meeting, and he agrees on the condition that she attends daily mass. Sajimol complies, meeting and conversing with him daily, and he helps transform her life. She adopts a stray dog, rekindles her romance with her old crush Roy, who has returned to Kerala, and Saint Roch promises to ensure her marriage goes smoothly.

Sajimol proposes to Roy in a cemetery, and he accepts. Their happiness is short-lived when the statue of Saint Roch is stolen. Sajimol reports it, but the locals dismiss it as the statue holds no significant value, deciding to replace it with a new one. The church allocates funds for the new statue, but the money is misappropriated and divided among members. Cleetus's son donates money to buy the statue to have his name inscribed on it, but Sajimol discovers that this new statue does not speak to her.

Determined to recover the original, Sajimol and her friend Minimol search for it. In a dream, Saint Roch reveals that her adopted dog is his. When the dog goes missing but is later found, Sajimol reads the Bible for clues and locates the statue in an abandoned house, only for it to be stolen again. Sajimol pursues the thieves on her bicycle and retrieves the statue. The chapel rewards her with the statue, and a few months later, Sajimol marries Roy.

== Cast ==
- Kunchacko Boban as Saint Rocky
- Nivetha Thomas as Sajimol Thomas
- Jayasurya as Roy Augustine
- Prayaga Martin as Annie
- Senthil Krishna as Vishnu "Minnal"
- Rajesh Sharma as Maliyekkal Thomas, Sajimol's father
- Sidhartha Siva as Priest
- Arya Rohit as Minimol
- Prem Prakash as Puthenpurayil Augustine, Roy's father
- Sreejith Ravi as Cleetus
- Baiju Ezhupunna as Puthenpurayil Kunjukunju, Augustine's younger brother
- Benny P Nayarambalam as the Parish Clerk

== Production ==
Principal photography began on 1 April 2022. This film marks the director's debut. The trailer was released on 6 April 2023. The film, which received mixed reviews, was released in theatres on 8 April 2023.

== Music ==
The soundtrack album for Enthada Saji was composed by William Francis, while the original background score was created by Jakes Bejoy. The songs "Neehaaram" and "Athmavil, Doorangal" were composed by William Francis.

== Reception ==
Vignesh Madhu, critic of Cinema Express, wrote that "Watching Enthada Saji feels like attending a prayer session as the makers indulge in plenty of preachiness, told mostly through Bible verses," and gave it 2.25 stars out of 5. Sanjith Sidhardhan, critic of OTTPlay, gave it 3 out of 5 and stated that "Enthada Saji is simple and pleasing, elevated by some warm moments and delightful performances of its cast". Mathrubhumi gave it a mixed review.

== Release ==
=== Theatrical ===
The film was released in theatres on 7 April 2023.

=== Home media ===
The digital streaming rights of Enthada Saji were acquired by Amazon Prime Video.
