= Listin Stephen =

Indian film producer and distributor (born 1986)

- Born: Uzhavoor, Kottayam, Kerala, India
- Occupations: Film producer; Film distributor
- Years active: 2011–present
- Organization: Magic Frames
- Spouse: Benitta Jacob (m. 2015)
- Children: 2
- Relatives: Justin Stephen (brother)
- Awards: National Film Award for Best Popular Film Providing Wholesome Entertainment (2012)

Listin Stephen is an Indian film producer and distributor who works in Malayalam, Tamil and Hindi film industries. He founded the film production company Magic Frames that has produced and distributed a lot of successful movies over a decade. His debut production was Traffic (2011), which heralded in a new age of film-making style and rejuvenated Malayalam cinema.

== Career ==
His debut production was Traffic (2011), which heralded in a new age of film-making style into Malayalam cinema. His second production was Chaappa Kurish (2011). While it encountered controversies, the film turned out to be a moderate commercial and critical hit. In 2012, he produced Ustad Hotel which won three National Film Awards, including the one for the Best Popular Film. Following the success of his films, he remade all three films in Tamil in association with R. Sarathkumar.

== Filmography ==
Key
†	Denotes films that have not yet been released

=== As producer ===
Year	Title	Language	Notes
2011	Traffic	Malayalam	Filmfare Award for Best Film – Malayalam
2011	Chaappa Kurish	Malayalam	
2012	Ustad Hotel	Malayalam	National Film Award for Best Popular Film Providing Wholesome Entertainment; SIIMA Award for Best Film; Asianet Film Award for Best Film; Nominated—Filmfare Award for Best Film – Malayalam
2013	Chennaiyil Oru Naal	Tamil	Remake of Traffic
2013	Pulivaal	Tamil	Remake of Chaappa Kurish
2014	How Old Are You	Malayalam	
2015	Chirakodinja Kinavukal	Malayalam	
2015	Sandamarutham	Tamil	
2015	Maari	Tamil	
2015	Idhu Enna Maayam	Tamil	
2017	Vimaanam	Malayalam	
2019	Margamkali	Malayalam	
2019	Brother's Day	Malayalam	
2019	Kettyolaanu Ente Malakha	Malayalam	
2019	Driving Licence	Malayalam	
2021	Mohan Kumar Fans	Malayalam	
2022	Jana Gana Mana	Malayalam	
2022	Kaduva	Malayalam	
2022	Kooman	Malayalam	
2022	Gold	Malayalam	
2023	Ennalum Ente Aliya	Malayalam	
2023	Selfiee	Hindi	Remake of Driving License; co-produced with Hiroo Yash Johar, Aruna Bhatia, Supriya Menon, Karan Johar, Prithviraj Sukumaran, Apoorva Mehta
2023	Thuramukham	Malayalam	
2023	Enthada Saji	Malayalam	
2023	Ramachandra Boss & Co	Malayalam	
2023	Garudan	Malayalam	
2024	Malayalee from India	Malayalam	
2024	ARM	Malayalam	
2024	Extra Decent	Malayalam	
2025	Prince and Family	Malayalam	
2025	Moonwalk	Malayalam	
2026	Baby Girl	Malayalam	
2026	Oru Durooha Saahacharyathil	Malayalam	
2026	Avaraachan & Sons	Malayalam	

=== As distributor ===
Year	Title	Language	Notes
2019	Petta	Tamil	Kerala Distribution
2019	Bigil	Tamil	Kerala Distribution
2021	Master	Tamil	Kerala Distribution
2022	Beast	Tamil	Kerala Distribution
2022	K.G.F: Chapter 2	Kannada	Kerala Distribution
2022	The Legend	Tamil	Kerala Distribution
2022	Nna Thaan Case Kodu	Malayalam	
2022	Chattambi	Malayalam	
2022	Godfather	Telugu	Kerala Distribution
2022	Thiruchitrambalam	Tamil	Kerala Distribution
2022	Kantara	Kannada	Karnataka Distribution
2022	Kumari	Malayalam	Co-Distributed with Prithviraj Productions
2022	Aanaparambile World Cup	Malayalam	
2022	DSP	Tamil	Kerala Distribution
2022	Gatta Kusthi	Tamil	Kerala Distribution
2023	Samara	Malayalam	
2023	Ayisha	Malayalam	
2024	ARM	Malayalam	

== Television ==
Year	Title	Language	Notes
2017–18	Avaril Oral	Malayalam	TV series on Surya TV
2021	Varnapakittu	Malayalam	TV series on Surya TV

== See also ==
- Thrissur Magic FC
- Nivin Pauly
