= Queen (2018 film) =

- Theatrical release poster
- Directed by: Dijo Jose Antony
- Written by: Sharis Mohammed; Jebin Joseph Antony
- Produced by: Shibu K. Moideen; Rinshad V
- Starring: Saniya Iyappan; Dhruvan; Ashwin Jose; Eldho Mathew; Arun H. Das
- Cinematography: Suresh Gopi
- Edited by: Sagar Dass
- Music by: Jakes Bejoy
- Production company: Arabian Dreams Entertainment
- Distributed by: Central Pictures
- Release date: 12 January 2018 (India)
- Running time: 157 minutes
- Country: India
- Language: Malayalam

Queen is a 2018 Indian Malayalam-language drama thriller film directed by Dijo Jose Antony and produced by Arabian Dreams Entertainment Co by Shibu K Moideen & Rinshad Vellodathil. It features Saniya Iyappan as a student in Mechanical Engineering batch. The idea was inspired from the 2015 Onam Celebration that took place in College of Engineering Adoor, Pathanamthitta, which was a massive controversy, and Sree Buddha College of Engineering, Pattoor, Alappuzha an institution in Kerala where a mass gang of boys and their only female classmate of the Mechanical Engineering Department made a dramatic entry making it a unique event becoming viral on internet, too.

Queen was released in India on 12 January 2018, where it became a commercial success at the box office. Saniya Iyappan won Filmfare Award for Best Female Debut – South for her performance in the film. It was remade in Tamil as Friendship in 2021 starring Harbhajan Singh, Arjun Sarja and Losliya Mariyanesan.

== Plot ==
Chinnu is a first semester mechanical branch student, who joins the college and soon becomes a lovable character within the entire first year batch of the college. Her classmates discover that she is an orphan and a cancer patient. During her time at the hospital, Chinnu's friends keep her company and makes friends with other patients. Chinnu recovers from the cancer through chemotherapy and surgery, where she visits college during Onam celebrations just to have fun with her friends and enjoy the campus life. Chinnu returns home in the evening to recuperate completely, but she gets kidnapped and sexually assaulted causing her death. Chinnu's friends and the people from the community fight for justice, where Adv. Mukundan also helps them. The real culprits are caught and delivered a death sentence by the trial court. In the aftermath, the students turn to social services and the film ends with the message that "women are not opportunities, but responsibilities of men".

== Cast ==
- Salim Kumar as Adv. Mukundan Unni (Extended Cameo) (Character from the movie Meesa Madhavan)
- Saniya Iyappan as Chinnu
- Dhruvan as Balu
- Aswin Jose as Muneer / Kooli
- Eldho Mathew as Eldho
- Arun Haridas as Jaban
- Sooraj Kumar as Varghese Kurien / Varkichan
- Sam Sibin as Shankar / Gymman
- Muhasin Moozi as Shyam / Shyama
- Jenson Alappat as Madapravu Ajith
- Vijayaraghavan as Principal Alex Abhraham
- Nandu as Adv. Kaaloor
- Kalasala Babu as Judge
- Sreejith Ravi as Minister
- Junice I V as Comrade Naushadikka
- Midhun A. E. as Senior student
- Monika Thomas Puthuran as Eliza
- Sunil K Babu as Viswaroopan (Buji)
- Niyas Backer as Head of Mechanical Department
- Dijo Jose Antony as Professor at Mechanical Department, Signing Professor at Marriage (Guest Appearance)
- Aneesh G Menon as Minister's assistant
- Sethu Lakshmi as Mother Thresiamma
- Santhosh Keezhattoor as Bride's father
- Malini Sivaraman as Bride's friend
- Baby Meenakshi as Bride's sister
- Jaimi Afzal as Bride
- Leona Lishoy
- Deepika Mohan as Balu's mother
- Hochimin K C
- Unni Meghalan as Unni

== Production ==
The movie was produced by Shibu K Moideen and Rinshad Vellodathil, from the studio Arabian Dreams Entertainment.

== Music ==
Queen

Soundtrack album by Jakes Bejoy
- Released: 3 January 2018
- Genre: Feature film soundtrack
- Label: Satyam Audios

Jakes Bejoy chronology
10 Endrathukulla (2015)	Queen (2018)	Mannar Vagaiyara (2018)

Singles from Queen
- 1. "Lal Anthem" Released: 23 January 2018

The original songs for the film were composed by Jakes Bejoy, with lyrics written by Joe Paul, Sharis Muhammed, and Jyothish T. Kasi. The soundtrack album was released by Satyam Audios on 3 January 2018. Dijo Jose Antony and Arun Nandakumar choreographed the songs "Saare Njangal" and "Podi Parane" respectively.

Queen (Original Motion Picture Soundtrack)
No.	Title	Singer(s)	Length
1.	"Saare Njangal"	Jakes Bejoy, Benny Dayal, Ziya Ul Haque, Kavitha Gopi, Zonobia Safar	4:30
2.	"Aarandda"	Ajaey Shravan, Kesav Vinod, Jakes Bejoy	2:04
3.	"Vennilave"	K. S. Harisankar, Sooraj Santhosh, Ziya Ul Haque, Ajaey Shravan	5:27
4.	"Podipaarana"	Ajaey Shravan, Kesav Vinod, Sunilkumar P. K.	4:35
5.	"Ponnumkasavinte"	Neha Nair	4:24

== Release ==
The film was released on 12 January 2018 across 84 theaters in Kerala.

== Reception ==
=== Critical response ===
Arjun R Krishnan from Malayala Manorama has written that 'Queen', the debut work by director Dijo Jose Antony, presents quite a few contemporary issues in a titillating cinematic wrap and rated the movie 3.5 out of 5.

The film, however, was not received well by some critics. Anna MM Vetticad of Firstpost refused to rate the film, calling it a 'non-film', and was outraged by the fact that this 'nondescript' film managed to get released not only in Kerala, but outside it as well, when far superior films were struggling to find theaters. Sowmya Rajendran of The News Minute wrote that the film does a disservice to rape survivors by suggesting that the rape and murder of the female protagonist in the film is tragic only because she was an orphan, a cancer patient, and blameless in all respects. She also criticized the film's concluding message that men should see women as their responsibility and assume the role of their protectors.
