= Kaduva =

2022 Indian film directed by Shaji Kailas

- Theatrical release poster
- Directed by: Shaji Kailas
- Written by: Jinu V. Abraham
- Produced by: Supriya Menon; Listin Stephen
- Starring: Prithviraj Sukumaran; Vivek Oberoi; Samyuktha
- Cinematography: Abinandhan Ramanujam
- Edited by: Shameer Muhammed
- Music by: Jakes Bejoy
- Production companies: Prithviraj Productions; Magic Frames
- Distributed by: Magic Frames
- Release date: 7 July 2022
- Running time: 154 minutes
- Country: India
- Language: Malayalam
- Box office: ₹50 crore

Kaduva (transl. Tiger) is a 2022 Indian Malayalam-language action film directed by Shaji Kailas, written by Jinu V. Abraham and produced by Prithviraj Productions and Magic Frames. It stars Prithviraj Sukumaran in the title role alongside Vivek Oberoi, Arjun Ashokan, Samyuktha, Alencier Ley Lopez, Baiju Santhosh and Kalabhavan Shajohn. Set in 1990s, Kaduva revolves around an ego war between Kaduvakunnel Kuriyachan, an arrogant businessman and IG Joseph Chandy.

Principal photography took place from April 2021 to March 2022 at Pala, Erattupetta, Vandiperiyar, Mundakkayam and Ernakulam. Jakes Bejoy composed the soundtrack and film score, while the cinematography and editing were handled by Abinandhan Ramanujam and Shameer Muhammed respectively.

Kaduva was released on 7 July 2022 to mixed reviews from critics and became the third highest-grossing Malayalam film of 2022.

== Plot ==
In the late 1990s, Kaduvakunnel Kurian Koruthu alias Kuriyachan "Kaduva", a wealthy and arrogant businessman in Pala, is brought to the district jail in Kottayam, where a murder attempt is made on him by three goons from Kottarakkara sub-jail under the orders of IG Joseph Chandy alias Ousepputty, but Kaduva defeats them. Before getting arrested, Kaduva was living a happy life with his family consisting of his wife Elsa and children Tessa, Eva and Chacko. However, Kaduva, due to his arrogance, had an ego-war with Joseph by speaking bad about Joseph's son, who has down syndrome, resulting Joseph to dislike Kaduva. When Joseph's mother Theruthi Chedathi lied that a piano was gifted to the church's perverted priest Fr. Robin Poovampura, instead of the church, Kaduva insults Joseph's late father Karikandhathil Chandichayan, making Joseph and Theruthi Chedathi to swear vengeance on Kaduva for the humiliation.

Joseph swore vengeance against Kaduva and transfers all the cops in Pala and appoints SI Dominic and new officers to replace them. Dominic already had a grudge on Kaduva as his father Benjamin was thrashed by Kaduva earlier. Joseph bought land that belonged to an American family, which was sold by Kaduva, and closes down his bar. With his influence, Joseph issues a search warrant on Kaduva's house. On his way back home, Kaduva was stopped by ASI Johny Antonio, who tried arresting Kaduva in an arms licence case, but Kaduva thrashed them and was subsequently surrendered. Kaduva's bar licence gets revoked due to his alleged involvement in spirit smuggling.

After narrating his past, Kaduva is released two weeks later and learns that his father's Ambassador car has been seized by Benjamin and that Tessa has fractured her leg. Tessa secretly tells him that Robin had caused her injury and attempted to molest Elsa. When Tessa tried intervening, Robin pushed her down the stairs. Tessa makes Kaduva promise not to cause any problems. Kaduva meets his friend Victor and learns that Dominic had thrashed him as he was about to file a complaint against Benjamin and other officers to the DGP.

Meanwhile, Ananthanathan is ousted from his CM post due to his corrupt activities, which comes into limelight. It is revealed that Kaduva had met his sister Leena's classmate Sunny in prison, where he learns that the evidence linking the politician's illegal activities are with Francis Paul and Kunjithomman. After his release, Kaduva, with Sunny's help, makes a deal with Francis and Thomman to provide the video evidence of the party's corruption in exchange for money and leadership changes in the party, to which they agree. Due to the deal, Kaduva had sold some of his estate. After Thomman becomes the CM and Sunny's release from prison, Kaduva brutally thrashes Robin and throws him into the church's well. Kaduva also makes Thomman to issue an order to freeze the promotion of Joseph to ADGP due to multiple accusations against him.

Kaduva thrashes Dominic and retrieves his father's Ambassador car. Ananthanathan learns that there will be a raid in his house by the CVC and asks Joseph to transport the goods to a safe place. Joseph attempts to transports the goods to his plantation in Anakkara, only to be thwarted by Kaduva. The goods are discovered and Joseph gets suspended. Enraged, Joseph hires a goon from a mental asylum to kill Kaduva at a church festival, but Kaduva manages to thrash him and his goons to death, where he fights Joseph and defeats him. Joseph is later arrested on charges of corruption. Kaduva also blackmails Thomman and Paul for a lifetime commitment when he shows them the video of the meeting between him and them. Whilst leaving for prison, Joseph tells Kaduva that their feud has not finished and promises to meet him soon, to which Kaduva agrees.

== Cast ==
- Prithviraj Sukumaran as Kaduvakunnel Kurian Korthu / Kuriyachan "Kaduva"
- Vivek Oberoi as IG Joseph Chandy IPS (voice dubbed by Vineeth)
- Arjun Ashokan as Victor, Kuriyachan's friend
- Samyuktha as Elsa Kurian, Kuriyachan's wife
- Baiju Santhosh as Advocate Kora
- Alencier Ley Lopez as Varkey, Kuriyachan's mentor
- Kalabhavan Shajohn as SI Dominic Benjamin
- Rahul Madhav as Fr. Robin Poovampara
- Priyanka Nair as Merin, Joseph's wife
- Janardhanan as Ananthanathan, former CM of Kerala
- Seema as Theruthi Chedathi, Joseph's mother (voice dubbed by Mallika Sukumaran)
- Innocent as Fr. Vattasheryil
- Suresh Krishna as CM Kunji Thomman
- Shivaji Guruvayoor as Revenue Minister Thomas Poovampara
- Nandhu as SI Manmadhan
- Joy Mathew as Bishop of Pala
- Aneesh G. Menon as Sunny
- Sudheesh as Mathai
- Sudheer Karamana as Basheer, Jail Superintendent
- Vijayakumar as CI Rajeevan
- Abu Salim as Benjamin, Dominic's father
- Chali Pala as Charlie
- V. K. Sreeraman as Bishop of Thrissur
- Angelina Abraham as Tessa Kurian, Kuriyachan's elder daughter
- Vriddhi Vishal as Eva Kurian, Kuriyachan's younger daughter
- Arish Anoop as Chacko Kurian, Kuriyachan's son
- Jolly Chirayath as Victor's mother
- Gouri Parvathi as Victor's sister
- Rajesh Hebbar as Dr. Paulachan
- Malavika Menon as Mary
- Ranjini George as Varkey's wife
- Saju Navodaya as Shankaran
- Balaji Sarma as Jail Warden
- Jaise Jose as SI Chandrababu
- Kottayam Ramesh as Fr. Gabriel
- Renji Panicker as Judge of District Court (voiceover)
- N. F. Varghese as Karikandathil Chandychan, Joseph's late father (photo presence)
- Mammootty as Kaduvakunnel Koruthu, Kuriyachan's late father (photo presence)

== Production ==
=== Development ===
Kaduva was officially announced on 16 October 2019 on Prithviraj Sukumaran's birthday, to be directed by Shaji Kailas and written by Jinu V. Abraham, along with a poster featuring Prithviraj captioned "inspired from a true story". Jointly produced by Prithviraj's Prithviraj Productions and Listin Stephen's Magic Frames. Jinu said, although the film is inspired by a true story, it constitutes only five percent of the film and rest is fictional, which is set in 1990s. He first narrated the screenplay to Prithviraj, who suggested Kailas' name as director and brought him on board. The film was expected to begin production in March 2020 as soon as Prithviraj completes Aadujeevitham.

Prithviraj plays the character of Kaduvakunnel Kuryachan, a young planter from a Christian family in Pala. Prithviraj said, though he received the screenplay only in early 2019 he had heard about the character even before that. Prithviraj was filming for Driving Licence when he called Shaji Kailas for directing the film. It was after Kailas agreed to do the film Prithviraj and Listin decided to produce it. Shooting which was scheduled to begin somewhere in mid-2020 was postponed due to the COVID-19 pandemic in India. In June that year, an untitled film to be directed by Mathews Thomas, produced by Tomichan Mulakuppadam, and starring Suresh Gopi was announced, which bears the same character name Kaduvakunnel Kuruvachan. This prompted Jinu to file a case against them at District Court, Ernakulam alleging plagiarism. The court stayed its production and promotional activities as Jinu's screenplay was registered under copyright law. Beside character name, promotional materials of SG250 (working title) also bears similarity to what is depicted in Kaduva's poster, said Jinu. The initial title he found for Kaduva was Kaduvakunnel Kuruvachan and the screenplay was also registered under that title, it was changed after producer Stephen asked him to choose a shorter title. Jinu V. Abraham said Mathews had worked under him as an assistant director and had known him since 2011, with whom he had discussed stories, including Kaduva.

In October 2020, upholding the order of District Court, the High Court of Kerala gave clearance to Kaduva to proceed with production while restricting SG250 from making a film unless they create a new character and make major changes in the screenplay. A plea challenging the stay order of District Court was filed by the makers of SG250 (officially titled Ottakkomban), but it was dismissed by the Supreme Court of India in April 2022.

A petitioner, Kuruvinakunnel expressed doubt as whether Kaduva and SG250 are based on his life. Clarifying that, Shaji Kailas said it was Jinu V. Abraham who came to him with the screenplay which he originally wrote for another director, and Kaduva is not based on Kuruvinakunnel's life and Jinu's Kuruvachan is an imaginary character who also happens to be a planter. The District Court s quashed the petition and questioned the intentions of the petitioner in filing a case just before the release of the movie.

=== Casting ===
Prithviraj said that they shortlisted several names for the character of Joseph Chandy, and at one time considered Biju Menon for the role, but since both Prithviraj and Menon has done similar roles in Ayyappanum Koshiyum they ruled out Menon and ultimately zeroed in Vivek Oberoi as per majority opinion. There were rumours that Mohanlal was part of the cast, appearing in a cameo role. Addressing it, Shaji Kailas clarified that they indeed had planned to cast Mohanlal in a cameo role, but it did not work out.

=== Filming ===
Principal photography began on 17 April 2021. However, by the end of that month, filming was suspended after a surge in COVID-19 cases in Kerala. After completing Alone, Shaji Kailas began the second schedule of Kaduva on 24 October, which was expected to last for 70 days. Prithviraj joined in the second schedule. Oberoi joined the set in November. Abinandhan Ramanujam was the cinematographer. Filming was completed in March 2022.

The film was mainly shot at locations in Pala and Erattupetta in Kottayam district and Vandiperiyar in Idukki district. Since the film is set in 1990s, they wanted to recreate old District Court, Kottayam, it was created as set in a 4-5 acre land at Ernakulam. While filming in Mundakkayam, there was a 50-person limit pertaining to COVID-19 restrictions set by the government. At Mundakkayam, the crew suffered flood and landslide, the set constructed was damaged. Filming went past three waves of COVID-19 in India. Prithviraj and Shaji Kailas was tested COVID-19 positive. Five fight sequences and three songs were filmed for the film. Kalabhavan Shajohn was tested COVID-19 positive while filming in Kochi. The film took two years to complete, overcoming COVID-19 pandemic, flood, and landslide.

== Music ==
The film was announced with Thaman. S as the music director, making his Malayalam debut. But after the project was delayed, Thaman was replaced by Jakes Bejoy. The first single was released on 19 June 2022.

Track listing
No.	Title	Lyrics	Singer(s)	Length
1.	"Paalvarnna Kuthiramel"	Santhosh Varma	Jakes Bejoy, Libin Scaria, Midhun Suresh, Swetha Ashok	4:19
2.	"Pala Palli"	Santhosh Varma, Sreehari Tharayil	Athul Narukara	4:35
3.	"Kudamattam Palli"	Santhosh Varma	Vijay Yesudas, Swetha Ashok, Sachin Raj	3:03
Total length:				11:57

== Release ==
=== Theatrical ===
Kaduva was released on 7 July 2022. In addition, the film will be released in dubbed versions of Tamil, Kannada, Hindi, and Telugu languages. It was initially scheduled for a theatrical release on 30 June 2022. The team promoted the film at an event in Bangalore and Chennai.

=== Home media ===
The digital streaming and satellite rights of the film are acquired by Amazon Prime Video and Surya TV, while the Hindi version was sold to Disney+ Hotstar. The film was digitally streamed on 4 August 2022

=== Controversies ===
The protagonist, played by Prithviraj Sukumaran, was seen making inappropriate comments against disabled persons and their parents. The dialogue was eventually removed from the film.

== Reception ==
=== Box office ===
On its opening day, Kaduva grossed around ₹7 crore. On its third day, the film has earned around ₹15 crore at the Kerala box office. On the seventh day of its release, the film has grossed around ₹30.20 crore and became one of successful ventures in Malayalam cinema after Bheeshma Parvam, Hridayam and Jana Gana Mana. The film grossed over ₹50 crore (equivalent to ₹58 crore or US$6.0 million in 2026) and became one of the highest grossing Malayalam films of 2022.

=== Critical response ===
Kaduva received mixed reviews from critics. On the review aggregator website Rotten Tomatoes, 40% of 5 critics' reviews are positive, with an average rating of 3.5/10.

Sajin Shrijith of The New Indian Express gave 3.5/5 stars and stated "We need to see the bad guys do something that would provoke our ire so that when, finally, the hero returns for payback, we take delight in every punch that lands. Thankfully, Kaduva follows this philosophy to a T, and I had quite a blast." Arjun Menon of Pinkvilla gave 3.5/5 stars stating that "However, the film is a made-for-theatre watch, aided by a splendidly enjoyable background score from Jakes Bejoy and the thunderous frames that elevate the commonplace plot to new heights of first-rate commercial filmmaking that is meant to be experienced with a bunch of strangers in a dark room. Yes, Kaduva might have just saved Malayalam cinema for all we know or set off a new focus on narrating larger-than-life tales with the grounded, economy of new-age storytelling.

Cris of The News Minute gave 3.5/5 stars and wrote "The film starts and ends in the middle of nowhere, extracting a slice of Kuriachan's life. You do get to taste a bit of nostalgia in seeing land phones, Doordarshan's intro theme and a single television reporter in front of the CM. But the rest of the film is just a nicely edited long and unexciting script." Anna Mathews of The Times of India gave 3/5 stars and wrote "If you are in the mood for a Prithviraj mass thriller, you might enjoy the movie, but don't expect to be wow-ed." India Today gave 2.5/5 stars and wrote "Kaduva is entertaining despite its predictability. But, a little bit of inventiveness could have elevated Kaduva more." Jayadeep Jayesh of Deccan Herald gave 2.5/5 stars and wrote "'Kaduva' can be appreciated for representing a style of filmmaking that Malayalam cinema has long forgotten. There are many nostalgia-inducing moments and Prithviraj's charisma is captivating. Apart from these aspects, the film is just average.

Anna M. M. Vetticad of Firstpost gave 1.75/5 stars and wrote "There is a lot of physical movement in Kaduva – fists and legs swing across the screen, vehicles speed and overturn, bodies spin in mid-air. Shaji Kailas' storytelling though remains frozen in time, back in the 1990s when he first shot into the limelight, as unmoving as the mundu tucked around Kuriyaachan's waist." Manoj Kumar R of The Indian Express wrote "And this entire movie, which is a celebration of vanity, is so excruciatingly dull. One can't help but wonder, who still finds slow-motion walks and frequent twirls of moustache a product of big-screen entertainment?"

S. R. Praveen of The Hindu stated that "Shaji does manage to deliver that, dipped in more than an ounce of predictability, but for those looking for some novelty, Kaduva might not be it. This is despite it being a notch better than all of the work that Shaji has done post-2000." Vishal Menon of Film Companion wrote "Yet you have to give it to Jakes Bejoy's background score and Abhinandan Ramanujam's camera for working overtime to re-interpret what could have been a 30-year-old film. Not only do they get exactly what the director's trying to make, but they also give it their own individual tributes to make something old feel new. The result is a balls-out unpretentious action movie that owns every second of its pitch as an ultimate male revenge fantasy."
