= Dhruvan =

Actor

- Born: Ottapalam, Kerala, India
- Occupations: Actor; model
- Years active: 2018–present
- Notable work: Queen
- Spouse: Anjali (m. 2022)

Dhruvan is an Indian actor who works primarily in Malayalam cinema.

== Career ==
Dhruvan started his career as a junior artist in Lisammayude Veedu (2013). He garnered recognition through the film Queen (2018), in which he portrayed the male lead role of Balu.

== Personal life ==
Dhruvan married Anjali on 28 March 2022. Their wedding took place at Palakkad, Kerala.

== Filmography ==
Year	Title	Role	Notes
2013	Lisammayude Veedu		Junior artist
2013	Pattam Pole		Junior artist
2014	Gangster	Akbar Ali Khan's Team member	
2015	Lord Livingstone 7000 Kandi		Junior artist
2018	Queen	Balu	Debut as Lead
2019	Children's Park	Rishi	
2019	Finals	Aadhi	Cameo appearance
2022	Aaraattu	Sreedharan Master's son	Cameo appearance
2022	Valimai	Amith	Tamil film
2022	Jana Gana Mana	Shaheen	
2023	Adi	Joby Varghese	
2023	Kasargold	Rajeesh	
2023	Kannur Squad	Zulfiqar Ali	
2025	Identity	Deepak John	
2025	Nancy Rani	Ashik Peter James	
2025	Khajuraho Dreams	Surya Narayanan	
2026	Vivaah		
