= Dijo Jose Antony =

Indian film director

- Born: 25 August 1988 (age 38); Ernakulam, Kerala, India
- Education: Bhavan's Vidya Mandir, Girinagar and Federal Institute of Science and Technology
- Occupation: Film director
- Years active: 2018–present
- Spouse: Pratibha Susan Thomas
- Parent(s): Jose Antony and Deena Jose

Dijo Jose Antony (born 25 August 1988) is an Indian film director, ad film maker and musician who works predominantly in Malayalam cinema. He debuted as a film director with the film Queen (2018) featuring newcomers. Dijo has also directed many ad films including the Kairali TMT's viral advertisement starring Mohanlal.

== Early life ==
Dijo Jose Antony was born in Ernakulam, Kerala on 25 August 1988 to Jose Antony and Deena Jose. He has two siblings, Deepu Jose and Deepti Jose. Dijo was educated in Bhavan's Vidya Mandir, Girinagar and graduated in Electrical Engineering from the Federal Institute of Science and Technology, Angamaly. Dijo began his media career in 2010 with a Malayalam musical album titled "La Cochin". In 2018, he debuted as a film director with the film Queen which featured many debutant artists and crew members. Dijo is also an ad filmmaker, making ads for various brands and corporates under the brand name La Cochin.

== Career ==
=== Feature films ===
In 2010, Dijo composed music and directed the musical album "La Cochin" which featured songs by renowned singers Vineeth Sreenivasan, Vidhu Prathap and Franco Simon. Later, Dijo ventured into making short films while managing his full time IT job. His short films won various accolades. In 2017, Dijo quit his IT career and joined the Malayalam film industry as a filmmaker.

Dijo's first film Queen became a box-office hit in 2018. It spoke about social injustice towards young girls and the atrocities they face on their day-to-day life.

Dijo's second feature film Jana Gana Mana starring Prithviraj Sukumaran and Suraj Venjaramoodu in the lead opened to mostly positive reviews and emerged as a commercial success. His debut film, Queen, has been remade into Tamil as Friendship, starring cricketer Harbhajan Singh.

In December 2023, the official YouTube Channel of Magic Frames film production company released the official promo of Dijo's next directorial titled Malayalee From India. The promo featured Dijo, Nivin Pauly, Dhyan Sreenivasan, and Anaswara Rajan. The movie released on 1 May 2024. His fourth directorial venture was the much hyped Pallichattambi starring Tovino Thomas and Kayadu Lohar, with Prithviraj Sukumaran in an extended cameo.

=== Advertisements ===
Dijo heads the advertisement film production house La Cochin named after his debut music album. He has directed and produced several commercials under the production house, with the viral Kairali TMT ad featuring Mohanlal being the most popular one.

== Personal life ==
He is married to Pratibha Susan Thomas and the couple has a son named David Joseph Dijo.

== Filmography ==
Year	Title	Co-writers	Notes	Ref.
2018	Queen	Sharis Muhammed, Jebin Joseph Antony	Debut	
2022	Jana Gana Mana	Sharis Muhammad		
2024	Malayalee From India	Sharis Muhammad		
2026	Pallichattambi	S. Suresh Babu		
