= Jana Gana Mana (2022 film) =

2022 film directed by Dijo Jose Antony

- Theatrical release poster
- Directed by: Dijo Jose Antony
- Written by: Sharis Mohammed
- Produced by: Supriya Menon; Listin Stephen
- Starring: Prithviraj Sukumaran; Suraj Venjaramoodu; Pasupathi Raj; G. M. Sundar; Mamta Mohandas; Sri Divya
- Narrated by: Mammootty
- Cinematography: Sudeep Elamon
- Edited by: Sreejith Sarang
- Music by: Jakes Bejoy
- Production companies: Prithviraj Productions; Magic Frames
- Distributed by: Magic Frames
- Release date: 28 April 2022
- Running time: 165 minutes
- Country: India
- Language: Malayalam
- Box office: est. ₹50 crore

Jana Gana Mana (transl. The Minds of All People) is a 2022 Indian Malayalam-language political crime legal thriller film directed by Dijo Jose Antony and starring Prithviraj Sukumaran, Suraj Venjaramoodu, Pasupathi Raj, G. M. Sundar, Mamta Mohandas, Sri Divya. The music was composed by Jakes Bejoy with cinematography by Sudeep Elamon and editing by Sreejith Sarang. The film released on 28 April 2022 to positive reviews for its narrative style, cast performances, and technical aspects.

== Plot ==
The suspicious death of Saba Mariyam, a progressive and socially responsible college professor at the Central University in Ramanagara, sparks massive student protests led by student activist Gouri Lakshmi. When the state police brutally suppress these demonstrations, it triggers a nationwide wave of outrage against police brutality. Under immense public pressure, the Karnataka government appoints ACP Sajjan Kumar to spearhead the murder investigation.

Sajjan's initial probe reveals that four suspects cornered Saba and burned her to death. He arrests the individuals, but before they can be presented in court, political interference from top-tier police officials strips Sajjan of his jurisdiction over the case. Desperate to prevent the politically connected suspects from escaping judicial punishment, Sajjan takes them to an isolated location under the pretext of a crime scene reconstruction and orchestrates a fatal encounter, shooting them dead. The summary execution transforms Sajjan into a national hero in the public's eyes. However, human rights activists promptly file an official complaint challenging the legality of the encounter, forcing a high-profile court inquiry.

Aravind Swaminathan, a physically challenged advocate, takes up the legal defense for the encounter victims. Throughout the trial, Aravind strategically dismantles the public narrative, exposing how systemic prejudice, media sensationalism, and widespread thirst for vigilante justice have compromised both law enforcement and the judiciary. In a final courtroom revelation, Aravind exposes a massive, coordinated conspiracy by the Karnataka government designed to retain power in the upcoming elections, with Sajjan acting as the operational mastermind.

In truth, Saba’s death was a localized hit-and-run committed by her colleague, Vydarshan, who ran his car over her after she filed official charges against him for driving a lower-caste student named Vidya to suicide. When this routine vehicular homicide unexpectedly captured national headlines, Home Minister Nageshwara Rao, who was faced with intelligence reports projecting a crushing electoral defeat for his party, was advised by Sajjan to convert the tragedy into a highly publicized political tool to manufacture popular public support.

Sajjan is immediately arrested, but a subsequent twist reveals that he was the anonymous whistleblower who provided Aravind with the incriminating evidence. After his young son was injured in a suspicious accident (implied to be a warning engineered by Nageshwara Rao), a chance interaction with Saba's grieving mother, Shabana, left a terrified Sajjan overwhelmed by immense guilt and remorse. Seeking redemption, Sajjan collaborated with his colleague, Moorthy, who had witnessed the execution of the four framed suspects, to covertly compile and deliver the necessary state evidence to Aravind's team.

Sometime later, Moorthy visits a reformed and at-peace Sajjan in prison, updating him on Vydarshan’s formal arrest and shedding light on Aravind’s hidden background. Aravind was actually a former DCP who had aggressively opposed Nageshwara Rao’s criminal network years prior. In retaliation, the politician had orchestrated a strike that killed Aravind's wife, Padma, and framed Aravind, resulting in his wrongful imprisonment. Alerted to Saba's manufactured encounter by Moorthy, Aravind had weaponized the trial to systematically dismantle Nageshwara Rao's political empire as personal vengeance. Sajjan acknowledges a past connection with Aravind, choosing to keep the details private. Inspired by Saba’s legacy, her former students decide to contest the upcoming elections directly against Nageshwara Rao’s party. The narrative concludes as Nageshwara Rao receives a menacing phone call from Aravind, who warns him that the courtroom exposure was merely a preliminary strike. As the student movement mobilizes for political change, Aravind casts aside his crutches, signaling the true commencement of his long-awaited retribution.

== Cast ==
- Prithviraj Sukumaran as Ex-DCP Adv. Aravind Swaminathan
- Suraj Venjaramoodu as Ex-ACP Sajjan Kumar
- Pasupathi Raj as Moorthy
- G. M. Sundar as Nageshwara Rao, Karnataka Home Minister
- Mamta Mohandas as Professor Saba Mariyam
- Sri Divya as Padma, Aravind's wife
- Shari as Shabana Mariyam, Saba's mother
- Priyanka Nair as Anitha Sajjan, Sajjan's wife
- Vaishnavi Venugopal as Sana Mariyam, Saba's younger sister
- Vincy Aloshious as Gouri Lakshmi
- Chitra Iyer as Swetha Gupta, chairperson of National Commission for Women
- Ilavarasu as Anpumani
- Shammi Thilakan as Adv. Raghuram Iyer
- Raja Krishnamoorthy as Justice Alok Varma
- Dhruvan as Shahin
- Harikrishnan as Mathew
- Shanavas as Sreenivasa Rao
- Midhun Venugopal as Omprakash
- Josekutty Jacob as Kishore
- Dhanya Ananya as Vidya
- Dileep K. Menon as Professor Vydarshan
- Vinod Sagar as Victor
- Raj Bal as Pavan Shetty
- Dijo Jose Antony as Professor Maharajas
- Bijin K. Baby as ASI Denzil D'Souza
- Anand Bal as Police Constable
- Sagar Surya as Party Member
- Jiffin George as News Anchor

== Production ==
The film is produced by Supriya Menon and Listin Stephen. The film stars Prithviraj Sukumaran, Suraj Venjaramoodu, Pasupathi Raj, G. M. Sundar and Mamta Mohandas.

== Music ==
The music of the film is composed by Jakes Bejoy.

No.	Title	Lyrics	Singer(s)	Length
1.	"Aalum Thee"	Sharfu	Jakes Bejoy, Akhil J. Chand	3:51
2.	"Etho Tharattin"	Jyothish T. Kashi	Jakes Bejoy, Sooraj Santhosh	4:01
3.	"Nila"	Jyothish T. Kashi	Aavani Malhar	2:52
4.	"Jana Gana Mana Anthem"	Joe Paul, Raqeeb Alam	Jakes Bejoy, Shankar Mahadevan, Shatadru Kabir	4:12

== Release ==
=== Theatrical ===
Jana Gana Mana released on 28 April 2022. The film was previously scheduled to release in late 2021, but was delayed due to the COVID-19 pandemic in India. The film was released in Malayalam along with the dubbed version in Tamil, Telugu and Kannada.

=== Home media ===
The digital streaming rights of the film were bought by Netflix and streaming started from 2 June 2022. The satellite rights of the film were sold to Surya TV.

== Reception ==
=== Critical response ===
Jana Gana Mana received positive reviews from critics and audience alike. Deepa Soman of The Times of India gave the film 3.5 out of 5 writing "Those who love a good political crime thriller inspired from real-life incidents can feast on Jana Gana Mana, that teaches you to think, question, challenge and more as a common man who consumes news at its face value." Pinkvilla gave 3.5/5 and wrote, An engaging Social drama about social conscience and asking the right questions. The Indian Express wrote "Prithviraj steals the show in this preachy and patronising political thriller". The New Indian express wrote "Prithviraj-starrer is an epic, high-impact political thriller". Ancy K Sunny of The Week rated 3.5 out of 5 and wrote "Suraj Venjaramoodu steals the show in a thought-provoking political thriller".

The film is loosely based on several real-life incidents in India, including the 2016 suicide of Rohith Vemula, 2018 murder of a tribal man in Kerala, the 2019 Hyderabad gang rape case and the 2019 suicide of Fathima Latheef.

== Sequel ==
On 29 March 2022, during the press event of the film, Prithviraj revealed that the pre-production works of the sequel of the film had already begun. He also revealed that the visuals featured in the teaser and trailer of the film were from the second part of the film. The first part would primarily feature flashback sequences while the second part would feature the story taking place during the current time.
