= Joju George filmography =

Indian actor, playback singer

Joseph George, better known as Joju George, is an Indian actor, playback singer and producer who works mainly in Malayalam cinema. His made his directorial debut with the film Pani.

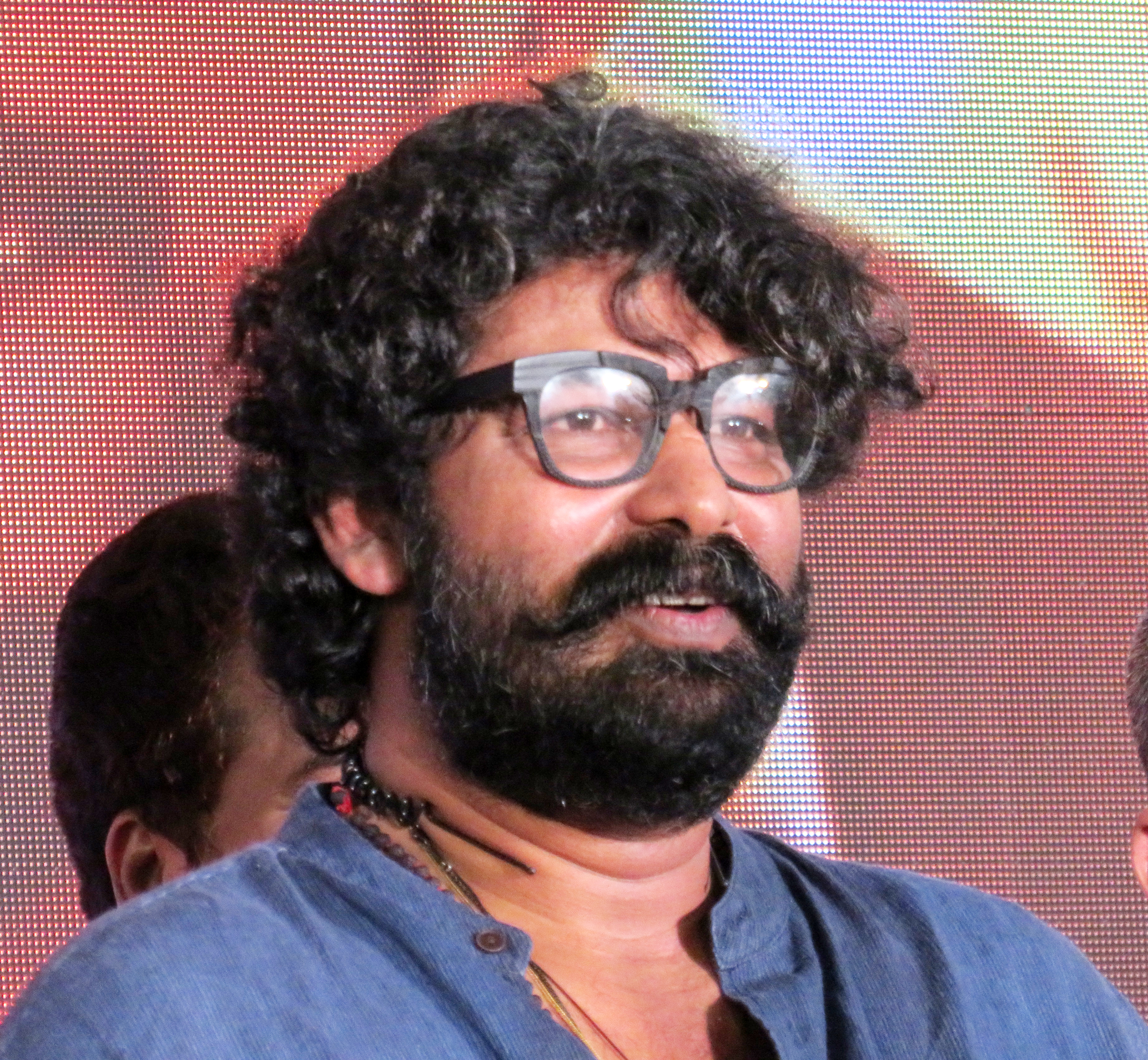
Joju George

== As actor ==
Key
†	Denotes films that have not yet been released

- All films are in Malayalam language unless otherwise noted

Year	Title	Role(s)	Notes
1995	Mazhavilkoodaram	College Student	
1999	Friends	Police Officer	Uncredited
1999	Independence	Bodyguard	Uncredited
2000	Dada Sahib	Governor's bodyguard	
2001	Rakshasa Rajavu	Gunashekharan's Henchmen	Uncredited
2001	Ravanaprabhu	Police Officer	
2001	Praja		
2003	Pattalam	Sajan	
2003	War and Love	Santhos	
2003	Manassinakkare	Politician	
2004	Vajram	SI	
2004	Freedom		
2004	Black	Ashok's friend	
2005	Finger Print	CI Shekhar	
2005	Chanthupottu	Police Officer	
2005	Nerariyan CBI		
2006	Vaasthavam	Basheer	
2007	Detective	Shekhar	
2007	Nadiya Kollappetta Rathri	Selvan	
2007	Rock & Roll	Gangster of Saidapet Giri	
2008	Mulla	Babu	
2008	Annan Thambi	Prakashan	
2008	Sulthan		
2008	Thirakkatha		
2008	Twenty:20	Gunda	Uncredited
2009	Angel John	Bus Conductor	
2010	Cocktail	Anand, Ravi's colleague	
2010	Best Actor		
2011	Race	Aanad Patel	
2011	Doubles	Doctor	
2011	Sevenes	Rameshan	
2011	Indian Rupee		Cameo appearance
2011	Beautiful		
2012	Ordinary	Sebastian	
2012	Outsider	Antony	
2012	Mayamohini	Police Officer John	
2012	Mallu Singh	Anandan's Youngest brother	
2012	Thattathin Marayathu	Viswan	
2012	Run Baby Run	Shibu	
2012	Trivandrum Lodge	Althas	
2012	Jawan of Vellimala	Vinu	
2012	I Love Me	Chacko	
2013	My Fan Ramu	Sanju	
2013	Kammath & Kammath	Malikapurakkal Tomichan	
2013	David & Goliath		
2013	Kili Poyi	Tony	
2013	Natholi Oru Cheriya Meenalla	Chicken Merchant	
2013	Sound Thoma	Chacko	
2013	Hotel California	Bharath Chandran IPS	
2013	Neram	Jiju	
2013	Pullipulikalum Aattinkuttiyum	Chakkattutharayil Suku	
2013	D Company	Abhilash Pillai	
2013	Vishudhan		Narator Voice only
2013	Escape from Uganda	Gautham	
2014	1983	Cricket Coach	
2014	Mosayile Kuthira Meenukal	Mathew P Mathew	
2014	Angry Babies in Love	Alex Maliyekkal	
2014	Vegam	George	
2014	Manglish	Luckochan	
2014	Avatharam	Surendran	Guest appearance
2014	RajadhiRaja	Ayyappan	
2014	Money Ratnam	Makudi Das	
2014	Homely Meals	Music Director	
2014	Odum Raja Adum Rani		
2014	The Dolphins	Koniyac ("Cognac") Pappinu	
2014	Karanavar	Kichu	
2014	Cousins	Tony	
2015	Mili	Eby	
2015	Onnam Loka Mahayudham	Anirudhan	
2015	Oru Second Class Yathra	Jolly Kurien	
2015	Lukka Chuppi	Rafeek	
2015	Loham	Pallan Davis	
2016	Action Hero Biju	Head Constable Minimon	
2016	Hello Namasthe	JayaMohan	
2016	IDI – Inspector Dawood Ibrahim	Vasu	
2016	10 Kalpanakal	Vakkachan	
2017	Fukri	Usman	
2017	Kunju Daivam	Shibu	
2017	Take Off	Nurse's husband	
2017	Ramante Eden Thottam	Elvis	
2017	Kadam Kadha		
2017	Oru Visheshapetta BiriyaniKissa	Maimootty	
2017	Udaharanam Sujatha	Head Master (Kuthira)	
2017	Melle		
2017	History of Joy	Police	
2018	Kaly	C.I Thilakan.T	
2018	Poomaram	Police inspector	
2018	Njan Marykutty	Police Inspector	
2018	Chalakkudikkaran Changathi	Raj Kumar	
2018	Joseph	Joseph	
2018	Ottakoru Kaamukan	Ananthakrishnan	
2019	Lonappante Mamodeesa	Babu	
2019	June	"Panama" Joy Kalarikkal	
2019	Virus	Babu	
2019	Porinju Mariam Jose	Kattalan Porinju Joy	
2019	Chola	Boss	
2019	Valiyaperunnal	Perumbavoor Shivakumar	
2020	Trance	Newsreader	
2020	Halal Love Story	Director Siraj	
2020	Kilometers and Kilometers	Appachan	
2021	Churuli	Thankan	
2021	One	Babychan	
2021	Aanum Pennum		
2021	Nayattu	ASI Maniyan	
2021	Mālik	Anwar Ali I.A.S., Sub-Collector	
2021	Star	Roy	
2021	Madhuram	Sabu	Released on Sony LIV
2021	Oru Thathvika Avalokanam	MLA Shanker	
2022	Freedom Fight	Baby	Malayalam Anthology film; Segment 'Old Age Home'
2022	Pada	Aravindan Mannoor	
2022	Aviyal	Krishnan	
2022	Solamante Theneechakal	CI D.Solaman	
2022	Peace	Carlos	
2022	Adrishyam	Sethu	
2023	Iratta	DYSP Pramod Kumar and ASI Vinod Kumar	Dual role
2023	Thuramukham	Mymoo	
2023	Article 21		
2023	Voice Of Sathyanathan	Balan	
2023	Pulimada	CPO Vincent Kariya	
2023	Antony	Antony Anthrapper	
2024	Aaro		
2024	Pani	Giri	Directorial debut
2025	Narayaneente Moonnaanmakkal	Sethu	
2026	Valathu Vashathe Kallan	Samuel Joseph	
2026	Varavu	Kaattungal Paulson	
2026	Aasha †	Jeemon	
2026	Ajasundari †	TBA	
2026	Paripadi †	TBA	

== Other language films ==
Year	Title	Role(s)	Language	Notes
2021	Jagame Thandhiram	Sivadoss	Tamil	Netflix release
2022	Putham Pudhu Kaalai Vidiyaadhaa	Murali	Tamil	Anthology series Segment: Mouname Paarvayaai
2022	Buffoon	Dhanpal	Tamil	
2023	Aadikeshava	Chenga Reddy	Telugu	
2025	Retro	Thilagan	Tamil	
2025	Thug Life	Pathros	Tamil	
2025	Bandar		Hindi	Monkey in a Cage at TIFF

== As producer ==
Year	Title	Notes
2015	Charlie	
2017	Udaharanam Sujatha	
2018	Joseph	
2019	Chola	
2019	Porinju Mariam Jose	
2021	Madhuram	
2023	Iratta	

== Playback singer ==
Year	Film	Song	Ref.
2018	Joseph	"Paadavarambathiloode"	
2021	Adrishyam	"Chandrakaladharane"	
2022	Peace	"Kallatharam"	
2023	Iratta	"Enthinadi Poonkuyile"	

== As director ==
Year	Title	Producer	Ref
2024	Pani	Appu Pathu Pappu	
2026	Paripadi †	Venu Kunnappilly	

== As writer ==
Year	Title	Director	Notes	Ref
2024	Pani	Joju George	Writer	
2026	Asha †	Safar Sanal	Writer	
2026	Paripadi †	Joju George	Writer	
