= Officer on Duty =

2025 Indian crime thriller film

- Theatrical release poster
- Directed by: Jithu Ashraf
- Written by: Shahi Kabir
- Produced by: Martin Prakkat; Renjith Nair; Siby Chavara
- Starring: Kunchacko Boban; Vishak Nair; Priyamani; Jagadish
- Cinematography: Roby Varghese Raj
- Edited by: Chaman Chakko
- Music by: Jakes Bejoy
- Production company: Martin Prakkat Films
- Release date: 20 February 2025
- Running time: 137 minutes
- Country: India
- Language: Malayalam
- Budget: ₹13 crore
- Box office: ₹54.25 crore

Officer on Duty is a 2025 Indian Malayalam-language crime action thriller film directed by Jithu Ashraf (in his directorial debut) and written by Shahi Kabir. It stars Kunchacko Boban in the title role. with Vishak Nair, Priyamani, Jagadish, Ramzan Muhammed, Aishwarya Raj and Leya Mammen in the supporting roles.

The film was positively received by critics, with the performance of its cast (particularly Kunchacko Boban, Jagadish and Vishak Nair), story, and music garnering praise and was a commercial success. It emerged as the top grossing solo release of Kunchacko, surpassing Anjam Pathira (2020).

== Plot ==
In Bangalore, Police Inspector Joseph Chembola of the Karnataka Police hangs himself in his house after leaving a suicide note orchestrated by a group of drug addicts led by Christy Savio.

Eight months later, in Kerala, Harishankar alias Hari is a hot-headed and impulsive officer who was recently demoted from his DYSP rank to CI after assaulting his superior officer by accident. Hari is subsequently assigned as the SHO of the Aluva police station. He receives a complaint about a KSRTC conductor named Chandrababu attempting to pawn an imitation gold chain. This seemingly minor case leads him to investigate a series of gruesome crimes, which are revealed to be connected to his own past personal tragedy.

Hari has PTSD which causes him to express his trauma violently, particularly toward his wife, Geetha. One day, Chandrababu reports to the police station that his gold chain was replaced with fake gold when he attempted to pawn it for his wife's surgery. Upon investigation, Hari discovers that Chandrababu's daughter Krishnapriya had switched the chain herself after being sexually exploited by an unknown perpetrator. Hari attempts to file a POCSO case, but before he can proceed, Krishnapriya commits suicide by hanging. Chandrababu blames Hari for his rude behaviour and his daughter's death. Witnessing her death triggers Hari's buried trauma, revealing that Hari's elder daughter, Nila, had also been sexually exploited. In a fit of rage, Hari kills a drug addict named Shyam in custody after discovering a sex tape of Nila on his laptop. Overcome with grief, Hari attempts to confront Nila, but she had already hung herself. The trauma causes his brain to suppress the incident.

In the present, Christy and his gang go to ASI Thomas, a recently released policeman who had taken the blame for Shyam's custodial death. Thomas had done so in an attempt to protect Hari since his own daughter had also been exploited by Shyam. To avenge Shyam's killing, Christy and his gang murder Thomas and his wife, but before dying, Thomas’ wife reveals to them that Hari was the one who actually killed Shyam. Meanwhile, Hari investigates and tracks down Anna, a member of Christy's gang, following her to Bangalore. A chase ensues, and Anna is fatally struck by a truck, dying on the spot. Later, Christy and his gang attempt to ambush Hari in the mortuary, but he successfully fends them off.

As the investigation unfolds, Hari discovers that Joseph had once arrested Shyam, Celine, and Anna for using drugs and slapping a girl's mother on a bus where Chandrababu was the conductor. While in custody, Joseph raped both Anna and Celine, leading Christy's gang to seek revenge on those responsible. Their revenge plan involved exploiting the women closest to those who contributed to their arrest. They began by targeting Joseph's daughter Angel, Krishnapriya and also Nila. It is revealed that Geetha and Nila were the mother and daughter who had been slapped by them and Geetha was the one who initially confronted the gang, making them a target.

Christy stabs Chandrababu and eventually tracks down Geetha and her younger daughter, Minnu, at her father's farmhouse. Christy and his gang attempts to kill them, but Geetha's father, a former soldier, fights back. However, he is soon killed by Christy. Geetha and Minnu try to escape from them but Christy follows them alone and stabs Geetha. Minnu escapes from him but he follows her and reaches a small building in the woods. His gang also arrives and before they can make a move, Hari arrives and a final showdown ensues where he brutally overpowers them. He nearly kills Christy for what he did to his and Chandrababu's family.

A few months later, Hari returns to his normal life and begins to focus more on his family. Meanwhile, Christy and his gang are released on bail and plan their next attempt to kill Hari. However, Hari anticipates their move and laces their drugs with poison, ultimately killing them and avenging Nila's death.

== Cast ==
- Kunchacko Boban as DYSP/ CI R. Hari Shankar
- Vishak Nair as Christy Savio
- Jagadish as Chandrababu, a KSRTC Conductor
- Priyamani as Geetha, Hari's wife
- Meenakshi Anoop as Nila, Geetha's and Hari's elder daughter
- Eithal Evana Sherin as Minnu, Geetha's and Hari's younger daughter
- Vaisakh Shankar as DYSP Shahul Hameed
- Ramzan Muhammed as Shyam Babu
- Vishnu G Varrier as Sathya Mithiran
- Aishwarya Raj as Anna Louis
- Leya Mammen as Celine John
- Amit Eapen as Lance
- Jithu Ashraf as CI Joseph Chembola, Karnataka Police
- Unni Lalu as Praveen
- Srikant Murali as ASI Venu
- Manoj K. U. as ASI Thomas
- Jain Andrews as SP Sooraj Rajan IPS, Ernakulam Rural
- Muthumani as Advocate Rekha Chandrasekhar
- Raghunath Paleri as Geetha's father
- C. J. Antony as Antony
- Angel Mariya as Angel, Joseph's daughter
- Sreelakshmi Meledath as Haseena
- Sheethal Thambi as Joseph's wife
- Henna Bella as Henna
- Jaya Kurup as Gracy
- Nileen Sandra as Police surgeon
- Anju Abraham as Chithra
- Delta Mani as Shivappa
- Pradeep as Pramod Shetty
- Shanth Kumar as Bangalore Police SI
- Babu Philip as Judge
- Kumariyamma as elderly complainant

== Production ==
=== Development ===
Kunchako Boban's untitled film was announced on 27 April 2024. Priyamani will be starring as the leading actress. The film marks the directorial debut of Jithu Ashraf, who previously served as an assistant director on films including Action Hero Biju, Udaharanam Sujatha, and Ela Veezha Poonchira and noted for his acting performances in Nayattu and Iratta. It is produced by Martin Prakkat Films and Siby Chavara and Ranjith Nair's The Green Room. The film is scripted by Shahi Kabir. Jithu and Shahi were earlier supposed to work on a project titled Aaravam, which was reportedly based on the snake boat race in Kerala and lives of the boat race community with Tovino Thomas, but it got dropped due to some unknown reasons and instead they went on with a different project. It has Roby Varghese Raj as the cinematographer, Jakes Bejoy as the music director and Chaman Chakko as the editor. The film was titled "Officer on Duty" which was announced on November 2, 2024.

=== Filming and casting ===
The principal photography commenced with a puja ceremony held at Lions Community Hall, Ernakulam on 27 April 2024. Vishak Nair, Priyamani, Meenakshi Anoop, Jagadish, Manoj K. U, Srikant Murali, Unni Lalu, Jay Kurup, Vysakh Shankar, Ramzan, Vishnu G. Nair, Anunath, Laiyam Mamman, Aishwarya and Amit Eapan will also be seen in pivotal roles in the film. In August 2024, it was reported that Vishak Nair was selected to play the villain role in the film.

== Music ==
The soundtrack was composed by Jakes Bejoy.

Track listing
No.	Title	Lyrics	Singer(s)	Length
1.	"Neon Ride"	Baby Jean, Ramya RamC	Baby Jean, Ramya RamC, Zeba Tommy	3:11
2.	"Vinnathiru Sakshi"	Vinayak Sasikumar	Vijay Yesudas	3:54
3.	"Kathum Kaanal"	Joe Paul	Aadhi Gopakumar	2:57
Total length:				10:02

== Release ==
Officer on Duty was released theatrically on 20 February 2025. The post theatrical digital streaming rights of the film was acquired by Netflix. The film started streaming from 20 March 2025.

== Reception ==
=== Critical reception ===
Sajin Shrijith of The Week rated the film four out of five stars and noted that "After Joseph and Nayattu, writer Shahi Kabir delivers another haunting investigative thriller, but this time with the slight trappings of a mass entertainer — a good one at that!" Rohit Panikker of Times Now gave the film three-and-a-half out of five stars and wrote, "Officer On Duty is a well-crafted investigative thriller that tries to be different but still relies on quite a lot of the genre's established templates. The film is worth a watch for its technical superiority, gripping performances, and a tight screenplay that offers an interesting experience even though it may not be something entirely new."

Anjana George of The Times of India gave it three out of five stars and wrote, "While Officer on Duty is a gripping, well-crafted thriller that keeps viewers on edge, it also serves as a stark reminder of how crime films continue to exploit the suffering of women for shock value." Vignesh Madhu of The New Indian Express gave it three out of five stars and wrote, "Officer on Duty could have been among the riveting cop thrillers in recent times, if not for the 'commercial compromises' it settles for."

Anandu Suresh of The Indian Express gave it two out of five stars and stated that "One of the film's biggest shortcomings is its inability to fully explore its emotional and dramatic moments. While the subject matter is undeniably serious and holds immense potential, Shahi Kabir's writing only scratches the surface, leaving many key moments feeling half-cooked". Cris of The News Minute wrote, "Where the script lacks is in expanding it into a package and writing the 'bad' characters. As soon as the 'villain' gang appears on screen, you realise the film has gone back decades, bringing alive forgotten stereotypes of wrongful youngsters, by the way they look, behave and indulge in vices."

S. R. Praveen of The Hindu wrote, "With Officer On Duty, Shahi Kabir conjures up yet another gripping police tale which works despite faltering at some points." Swathi P. Ajith of Onmanorama wrote, "The movie doesn't reinvent the wheel, but it delivers a solid, well-packaged thriller. It doesn't go overboard and keeps things as grounded as possible. For those who enjoy a good investigative drama, 'Officer on Duty' is definitely worth a watch on the big screen."

=== Box office ===
On its first day the film grossed ₹2.60 crore globally and ₹1.25 crore in Kerala. In 2 days, it grossed around ₹6 crore at the worldwide box office. In its first four-day opening weekend it grossed ₹10.65 crore in India out of which ₹9.15 crore came from home state and ₹1.50 crore from ROI and ₹10 crore from overseas, to a worldwide gross of ₹20 crore.

As of 2 March 2025, the film grossed ₹41 crore worldwide with Kerala standing at ₹20.75 crore. On 11 March 2025 the film's worldwide gross reached ₹50 crore. In 21 days, the film grossed ₹25.95 crore from Kerala. In its final run, it grossed ₹29.75 crore from Kerala, ₹4 crore from other states and ₹20.5 crore from overseas to a worldwide gross of ₹ 54.25 crore.
