= Pulimada =

2023 Malayalam film by A. K. Sajan

- Theatrical release poster
- Directed by: A. K. Sajan
- Written by: A. K. Sajan
- Produced by: Rajesh Damodaran; Sijo Vadakkan
- Starring: Joju George; Aishwarya Rajesh
- Cinematography: Venu
- Edited by: A. K. Sajan
- Music by: Ishaan Dev (songs); Anil Johnson (score)
- Production companies: Appu Pathu Pappu Production House; Ink Lab Cinemas; Land Cinemas
- Distributed by: Ann Mega Media Release
- Release date: 26 October 2023
- Running time: 110 minutes
- Country: India
- Language: Malayalam

Pulimada (transl. Leopard's den) is a 2023 Indian Malayalam-language thriller film written, edited and directed by A. K. Sajan. The plot follows the unforeseen events that occur on Vincent Kariya's (Joju George) wedding day and his subsequent mood changes. The film also features Aishwarya Rajesh, Chemban Vinod Jose, Jaffar Idukki, Johny Antony, Lijomol Jose, Jeo Baby and Balachandra Menon in the supporting cast.

Principal photography began in January 2022 in Wayanad. The songs were composed by Ishaan Dev, while Anil Johnson provided the background score. The cinematography is handled by Venu.

Pulimada was released on 26 October 2023 to mixed reviews from critics.

== Plot ==
Vincent Kariya (Scaria), also known as Ummachan, is a 40-year-old unmarried civil police officer who lives in 10th Mile, Wayanad, Kerala. He leads a lonely life and is haunted by memories of his deceased mother, who suffered from mental disorders. Following his engagement to Jessy, Vincent meets Dr. Joshi Kuriyan and expresses concern that his mother's mental disorders may pass on to him, causing several of his prior marriage proposals to be canceled. The doctor advises him to proceed with the marriage and instills confidence in him. Vincent's relatives Appachan and Kuttappaappi arrive with their families on the eve of the wedding. When the presence of a tiger is confirmed in the Thirunelly and Ambalavayal areas, forest officials issue an alert to the public through an announcement vehicle.

The next day, Vincent, his relatives, and friends arrive at the church for the wedding. Everyone realizes that Jessy eloped with her boyfriend. On hearing this, Vincent returns home in a flustered mood and asks everyone to leave. Late at night, he approaches a woman he knows and asks for sex. However, the woman avoids him since she is on her period. Vincent then approaches his friend, Kambikkuttan, and talks about the matter. On the way, he meets a young lady named Mahishmathi Emily Jayaram, whose car broke down while heading to Muthanga. Meanwhile, once the presence of the tiger has been confirmed, Vincent's friend, SI Ashokan, is on patrol duty. Vincent takes Mahishmathi to his house when she inquires about a place to stay for the night. She thinks it is a homestay, and Vincent introduces his friend Kuttimani as the manager and himself as its general manager.

Ashokan gets information that a girl is missing from Kalpetta. Sini, a civil police officer, suspects that the missing girl might be with Vincent. While on patrol, Sini informs Ashokan that there is a possibility of a crime at Vincent's home, but Ashokan ignores it. Mahishmathi learns through the wedding invitation card that it was Vincent's wedding night and tries to comfort him. Vincent asks Mahishmathi whether he can marry her, which she takes as a joke. He then attempts to sexually abuse Mahishmathi while inebriated.

The body of a girl is found in the forest by police officers. Vincent awakens from his drunken state to find Mahishmathi lying on the floor, bleeding. He calls Ashokan, who is at the scene of the girl's death. Vincent digs a pit near his house to bury Mahishmathi's body and calls the SP to inform him that a crime has been committed there. He calls Ashokan and tells him everything. Sini then requests that Ashokan do something right away. After the patrol, Ashokan and other officers arrive at Vincent's house in the morning. However, they were unable to locate the girl mentioned by Vincent. Ashokan says to Vincent that he must have felt all of those while intoxicated and asks him to join the service immediately.

Vincent, along with his Valyammachi, goes on a pilgrimage with a group to the Basilica of Our Lady of Good Health in Velankanni, Tamil Nadu. A female jailer calls Vincent and informs him that there is a molestation case against him and that he must surrender immediately. Mahishmathi, who was actually a culprit, unexpectedly comes on the call and tells Vincent that she actually pranked him that night because she didn't like the way he behaved with her. She also says that they will meet again soon. Later, Ashokan takes the initiative and arranges Vincent and Sini's marriage.

== Cast ==
- Joju George as CPO Vincent Kariya alias Ummachan
- Aishwarya Rajesh as Mahishmathi Emily Jayaram
- Chemban Vinod Jose as SI Ashokan
- Jaffar Idukki as Appachan
- Johny Antony as Kuttappaappi
- Lijomol Jose as CPO Sini
- Jeo Baby as Agustine
- Abin Bino as Kuttimani
- Balachandra Menon as Dr. Joshi Kuriyan
- Dileesh Nair as CPO Chandrabos
- Firoz as CPO Prasad
- Krishna Praba as CPO Anasuya
- Pauly Valsan as Valyammachi, Vincent's aunt
- Sona Nair as Molly, Appachan's wife
- Jolly Chirayath as Sherly, Kuttappaappi's wife
- Fara Shibla as Jessy
- Abu Salim as Kambikkuttan
- Roshan NG as Father
- Sajitha Madathil as Assistant Prison Officer Sreelakshmi
- Parvathi T. as Ammachi, Vincent's mother

== Production ==
=== Development ===
Pulimada marks the return of cinematographer Venu to Malayalam films after a nine-year gap. In January 2022, It was reported that Jakes Bejoy would be composing the music and Vivek Harshan was assigned as the editor. It was also reported that the film would be produced by Dixon Poduthas and Suraj P. S. under the banner of Ink Lab Cinemas in association with Super Deluxe Entertainment. The film was jointly produced by Rajesh Damodaran and Sijo Vadakkan under the banners of Appu Pathu Pappu Production House, Ink Lab Cinemas and Land Cinemas.

=== Filming ===
Principal photography began on 5 January 2022 in Wayanad. The filming began with a customary puja ceremony held at the Mount Avenue Hotel in Ambalavayal. The Nilavilakku was first lit by Stephy Zaviour, while producer Dixon Poduthas performed the switch-on and Suraj P. S. gave the first clap. The film was shot in 60 days on a single schedule.

== Music ==
The songs are composed by Ishaan Dev, while the background score is provided by Anil Johnson. Rafeeq Ahamed, Dr. Thaara Jeyashankar and Fr. Michael Panachikal wrote the lyrics. Ishaan Dev began composing songs for the film in 2022 in collaboration with the Budapest Orchestra. The first song "Arikil Onnu Vannal" was released on 22 August 2023. A promo song titled "Mada Trance," sung, written and composed by Dabzee, was released on 27 October 2023.

Track listing
No.	Title	Lyrics	Singer(s)	Length
1.	"Arikil Onnu Vannal"	Rafeeq Ahamed	Pradeep Kumar, Ishaan Dev	4:56
2.	"Neela Vaanile"	Dr. Thaara Jeyashankar	Pradeep Kumar	3:20
3.	"Swargam Vithakkunna"	Fr. Michael Panachikal	K. S. Chithra, Kester	4:27
4.	"Alakalil"	Dr. Thaara Jeyashankar	Ishaan Dev	3:31
Total length:				16:14

== Release ==
=== Theatrical ===
The film was released in theatres on 26 October 2023. It was distributed by Ann Mega Media Release.

=== Home media ===
The digital distribution rights were sold to Netflix and streaming began on 23 November 2023 in Malayalam, Tamil, Telugu, Kannada and Hindi.

== Reception ==
=== Box office ===
The film grossed $5,077 in the United Arab Emirates.

=== Critical response ===
Pulimada received mixed reviews from critics.

Kusumika Das of Times Now gave 3 out of 5 stars and wrote, "Pulimada offers a turbulent journey into the mind of its protagonist, with stellar performances and captivating visuals. While stumbling in its resolution, the film manages to be a worthwhile cinematic experience." Akhila Menon of OTTPlay gave 2.5 out of 5 stars and wrote, "Pulimada tries hard to establish itself as an edge-of-the-seat thriller. But predictability and inconsistency in writing prevent this Joju George starrer from emerging as an engaging watch."

Anandu Suresh of The Indian Express gave 2 out of 5 stars and wrote, "Although Pulimada mostly prompts a sense of bewilderment, the engaging performances and the brilliance of certain technical aspects render the AK Sajan film watchable." Vignesh Madhu of Cinema Express gave 2 out of 5 stars and wrote, "Though the actor excels throughout, it's hard not to get reminded of his previous performances from Joseph, Nayattu, and Iratta. It has also got to do with the fact that all these films are also set against the same hilly backdrop and have him as a disturbed, drunkard cop. But sadly, Pulimada doesn't achieve the cinematic excellence of any of those films."

Athira M. of The Hindu wrote, "AK Saajan's Pulimada (Tiger's Den) is a roller-coaster ride with twists and turns. However, the film falters at a few junctures, taking the sheen off an interesting narrative." Swathi P. Ajith of Onmanorama wrote, "Pulimada offers an enjoyable viewing experience that is sure to captivate, if not completely thrill, the audience. While the movie does tend to be quite loud with its background score, it does make for a decent watch, especially if approached with moderate expectations."
