= Ajayan Adat =

Audio engineer and sound designer

Ajayan Adat അജയൻ അടാട്ട്
- Born: Thrissur, Kerala, India
- Education: Film and Television Institute of India, Pune in 2016
- Occupations: Sound designer and Production sound mixer
- Years active: 2016 – present
- Spouse: Parvathy
- Children: May Sithara
- Parent(s): K Aravindakshan and T Padmavathy
- Awards: 53rd Kerala State Film Awards for best Sound design for the film Ela Veezha Poonchira & 54th Kerala State Film Awards for Best Sync Sound award for the film Pani

Ajayan Adat (born in Thrissur on 31 December 1987) is working in film sector as recordist, sync sound Recordist and Sound Designer mainly in South Indian cinema. He is based in Cochin. He is best known for his work in films like Soni (film), Nayattu (2021 film), Virus, Koode etc. He completed his primary and secondary education at Sree Rama Krishna Gurukula Vidhaya Mandiram. After completing his Graduation in Physics from the Sree Kerala Varma College in 2008, he joined the Film and Television Institute of India, Pune for Post Graduation Diploma in Sound Recording and Sound Design. After graduating in 2016, he started his career in Malayalam film industry as recordist, Sync sound Recordist., Recipient of 53rd Kerala State Film Award for best Sound design for the film Ela Veezha Poonchira. and 54th Kerala State Film Awards for Best Sync Sound award for the film Pani

== Filmography ==
=== As Production Sound Mixer ===
Year	Film	Language	Director
2025	Aaro-Short Film	Malayalam	Ranjith (director)
2025	Aasha	Malayalam	Safar Sanal
2025	Toxic: A Fairy Tale for Grown-Ups	Kannada & English	Geetu Mohandas
2024	Pani	Malayalam	Joju George
2023	Muthu Endra Kaattan	Tamil	M. Manikandan
2023	Adrishya Jalakangal	Malayalam	Dr. Biju
2023	Thangalaan	Tamil	Pa. Ranjith
2022	Wonder Women	English	Anjali Menon
2022	Natchathiram Nagargiradhu	Tamil	Pa. Ranjith
2022	Badhaai Do	Hindi	Harshavardhan Kulkarni
2021	Bell Bottom	Hindi	Ranjit M Tewari
2020	Nayattu	Malayalam	Martin Prakkat
2019	Kadaisi Vivasayi	Tamil	M. Manikandan
2019	Virus	Malayalam	Aashiq Abu
2018	Koode	Malayalam	Anjali Menon
2018	Soni	Hindi	Ivan Ayr for Netflix Original
2018	Oru Kuttanadan Blog	Malayalam	Sethu
2018	Poomaram	Malayalam	Abrid Shine
2017	Moothon	Malayalam	Geethu Mohandas
2017	Aeden	Malayalam	Sanju Surendran
2017	Raja Rasoi aur Andaz Anukha	Hindi	TV series
2016	Samarppanam	Malayalam	Kunnath Gopinathan
2015	In Their Shoes	Hindi	Atul Sabharwal
2014	The Superstars of Koti	Hindi	Films Division of India

=== As Sound Designer ===
Year	Film	Language	Director
2026	Aasha	Malayalam	Safar Sanal
2025	Vilayath Buddha	Malayalam	Jayan Nambiar
2025	Malayali Memorial	Malayalam	Nidheesh
2024	Pattth	Malayalam	Jithin Issac Thomas
2024	Pani	Malayalam	Joju George
2024	Pattth	Malayalam	Jithin Isaac Thomas
2023	Adrishya Jalakangal	Malayalam	Dr. Biju
2022	Peace	Malayalam	Sanfeer K
2022	Ela Veezha Poonchira	Malayalam	Shahi Kabeer
2022	Pada	Malayalam	Kamal KM.
2022	Kadaisi Vivasayi	Tamil	M. Manikandan
2021	Nayattu	Malayalam	Martin Prakkat
2019	Virus	Malayalam	Aashiq Abu
2018	Eeda	Malayalam	B. Ajithkumar
2014	Masala Republic	Malayalam	Visakh GS

=== As additional sync sound recordist ===
Year	Film	Language	Director
2018	Hey Jude	Malayalam	Shyamaprasad
2017	Mayaanadhi	Malayalam	Aashiq Abu
2017	Thondimuthalum Driksakshiyum	Malayalam	Dileesh Pothan
2017	Rakshadhikari Baiju Oppu	Malayalam	Ranjan Pramod
2014	Hi I'm Tony	Malayalam	Lal Jr.
2013	Annayum Rasoolum	Malayalam	Rajeev Ravi
