= Drishyam 3 (soundtrack) =

2026 soundtrack album by Anil Johnson

Soundtrack album by Anil Johnson
- Released: 18 May 2026
- Recorded: 2024–2026
- Studio: El Studios, San Francisco
- Genre: Feature film soundtrack
- Length: 7:27
- Language: Malayalam
- Label: Panorama Music
- Producer: Anil Johnson

Drishyam 3 is the soundtrack album composed by Anil Johnson for the 2026 Indian-Malayalam language crime drama thriller film of the same name, written and directed by Jeethu Joseph and produced by Antony Perumbavoor under Aashirvad Cinemas, starring Mohanlal, alongside Meena, Siddique, Kalabhavan Shajohn and Murali Gopy. The tracks are written by Vinayak Sasikumar.

The original soundtrack album consists of only 2 tracks, released on 18 May 2026 and 24 May 2026 respectively, while the background score album consists of 60 tracks which was released on 3 June 2026, all under the label of Panorama Music.

== Background ==
The film's soundtrack, along with the background score, was composed by Anil Johnson who worked for entire Drishyam franchise. Anil is the frequent collaborator of Jeethu Joseph and Drishyam 3 is the eighth collaboration of the latter after Memories (2013), Drishyam (2013), Life of Josutty (2015), Oozham (2016), Aadhi (2017), Mr. & Mrs. Rowdy (2019), Drishyam 2 (2021) and 12th Man (2022).

Additionally, Ajeesh Anto compsed the film's trailer theme, released on 9 May 2026.

== Track listing ==
No.	Title	Lyrics	Music	Singer(s)	Length
1.	"Ini Varumo"	Vinayak Sasikumar	Anil Johnson	Evugin	3:43
2.	"Ini Varumo (Female Version)"	Vinayak Sasikumar	Anil Johnson	Daliya Navas	3:43
3.	"Drishyam 3 – Motion Poster Theme"	Instrumental	Anil Johnson	Instrumental	1:20
4.	"Drishyam 3 – Trailer Theme"	Instrumental	Ajeesh Anto	Instrumental	1:13
5.	"Drishyam 3 – Teaser Theme"	Instrumental	Anil Johnson	Instrumental	1:51

== Background score ==
Drishyam 3

Film score by Anil Johnson
- Released: 3 June 2026
- Recorded: 2024-2026
- Genre: Film score
- Length: 1:02:50
- Language: Malayalam
- Label: Panorama Music
- Producer: Anil Johnson

The background score was composed by Anil Johnson and it consists of 60 tracks, with a runtime of over 1 hour and was fully released on 3 June 2026, under the label of Panorama Music.

Drishyam 3 (Original Background Score)
No.	Title	Length
1.	"Krishnakumar's Arrest"	1:46
2.	"Geetha Prabhakar in Depression"	0:42
3.	"Georgekutty's Family Moments"	1:06
4.	"Anju In Clinic"	0:42
5.	"Anju's Proposals"	1:15
6.	"Distribution of 'Drishyam'"	0:48
7.	"Yamini's Enquiries"	0:29
8.	"Family's Concerns"	1:37
9.	"Adv. Renuka Explains"	1:02
10.	"What About The Acid?"	1:02
11.	"Family Man's Freetime with Family"	0:57
12.	"Another Proposal"	0:29
13.	"Jose's Confession"	1:08
14.	"Georgekutty Helps"	1:19
15.	"At The DGP's Office"	1:37
16.	"Rajan's Betrayal"	1:37
17.	"Eye for an Eye"	1:21
18.	"Georgekutty's Fears"	1:58
19.	"Yamini Follows Georgekutty"	1:09
20.	"Georgekutty's Mistakes"	1:33
21.	"The Ditch"	1:05
22.	"Inside The Ditch In Rain"	1:10
23.	"Sahadevan's Return"	0:54
24.	"Past Sins"	0:30
25.	"A Reconstructed Love"	1:08
26.	"Avira's Proposal"	0:32
27.	"Hearing Aid"	0:35
28.	"Yamini in Shreya's House"	1:08
29.	"A Marriage Fixing"	0:35
30.	"Sahadevan At Clinic"	1:15
31.	"Sahadevan's Warning"	0:54
32.	"Reunion"	1:03
33.	"Georgekutty Meets Yamini"	2:25
34.	"IG Thomas Bastin"	1:14
35.	"Prabhakar's Re-entry"	1:17
36.	"Varun's Remains"	1:12
37.	"I Need Justice"	2:07
38.	"Prabhakar's Plans"	2:26
39.	"Prabhakar Recalls Sahadevan"	0:46
40.	"Sahadevan's Findings"	0:35
41.	"The Investigation Is On"	1:42
42.	"Marriage Plans"	2:11
43.	"Rani's Sorrows"	0:57
44.	"Confession: From Court to Church"	1:16
45.	"Marriage Turmoils"	0:20
46.	"Who's After It?"	0:57
47.	"Bail Granted"	1:26
48.	"Georgekutty Helps Anju"	2:02
49.	"Prabhakar's Plans (V2)"	1:27
50.	"Conclusion Of The Plan"	2:27
51.	"He Had Other Plans"	1:25
52.	"The Chase"	2:54
53.	"Finding Sahadevan"	2:54
54.	"Something's Not Right"	2:54
55.	"Georgekutty vs. Sahadevan"	1:06
56.	"Prabhakar's Threat"	1:33
57.	"This Isn't Me"	0:33
58.	"The Real Twist"	1:00
59.	"Surrender For Family"	2:31
60.	"The Finale"	1:57
Total length:		1:02:50
