= Visithiran =

Indian Tamil-language film

- First Look Poster
- Directed by: M. Padmakumar
- Written by: Shahi Kabir
- Based on: Joseph (2018) by M. Padmakumar
- Produced by: Bala; Siva Sekar Kilari
- Starring: R. K. Suresh; Poorna
- Cinematography: Vetrivel Mahendran
- Edited by: Sathish Suriya
- Music by: G. V. Prakash Kumar
- Production companies: B Studios; Shark Pictures
- Release date: 6 May 2022
- Country: India
- Language: Tamil

Visithiran (transl. Stranger) is a 2022 Indian Tamil-language police procedural film directed by M. Padmakumar starring R. K. Suresh and Poorna. It is a remake of the director's own Malayalam film Joseph (2018).

The film follows a retired police officer known for his investigative skills who becomes unexpectedly involved in an organ trafficking case following the death of his ex-wife.

The film was scheduled to release on 20 May 2022 but ended up releasing earlier on 6 May.

== Cast ==
- R. K. Suresh as Maayan
- Poorna as Stella
- Madhu Shalini as Meenakshi
- Bagavathi Perumal as Peter
- Ilavarasu
- George Maryan as Church Father
- Anil Murali as Police Officer
- G. Marimuthu
- Ravi Venkatraman
- Pondy Ravi as Police Officer
- Sudha Chandran as Advocate Srinithi
- Sangeetha V as Doctor
- Ganeshkar as Driver

== Production ==
Director Bala decided to produce the remake of Malayalam film Joseph under his banner with actor R. K. Suresh reprising the role of Joju George. John Mahendran was signed to write the dialogues for the original script of Shahi Kabir. Suresh increased his weight by 22 kilos and later had to shed weight for his young appearance, moreover, Suresh had to give three different voices in the dubbing for the film. Poorna and Madhu Shalini were signed to play the roles of Athmiya Rajan and Madhuri Braganza respectively. Malayalam actor Anil Murali reprised the same role in the original.

== Soundtrack ==
The music is composed by G. V. Prakash Kumar.

- "Aararo" - Nakkhul
- "Deva Emmai" - Yazin Nizar
- "Kaanaadha Deepam" - Arjun Muralidharan, Sindoori Vishal, Padmalatha
- "Kanne Kanne" - Roshan Sebastian
- "Ooduthe Ovvovuru Naalum" - Hariharasudhan

== Reception ==
Logesh Balachandran of The Times of India opined that "Overall, Vichithiran might appeal an audience that is on the lookout for an engaging emotional thriller as their weekend watch". Vignesh Madhu of Cinema Express stated that "With a lot going for it, especially RK Suresh's performance and the earnestness in storytelling, Visithiran is definitely one of the better remakes to come our way hitting not only the same highs of the original but resorting to similar lows". A critic from Behindwoods said that "Visithiran which is an official remake of the Malayalam superhit stays true to the original thanks largely to the captain of the ship M. Padmakumar". A critic from Maalai Malar Noted that "Through the screenplay, the director has shown how human lives are affected by the industries around medicine. They have made the film in the style of organ theft emotional thriller. He has skillfully worked among the characters.". Critic from Dinamalar gave 2.75 rating out of 5
