= Ronth =

2025 Indian Malayalam film

- Theatrical Release Poster
- Directed by: Shahi Kabir
- Written by: Shahi Kabir
- Produced by: Vineet Jain; Rathish Ambat; Renjith EVM; Jojo Jose
- Starring: Dileesh Pothan; Roshan Mathew
- Cinematography: Manesh Madhavan
- Edited by: Praveen Mangalath
- Music by: Anil Johnson
- Production company: Junglee Pictures Festival Cinemas
- Distributed by: Festival Cinemas
- Release date: 13 June 2025
- Running time: 122 minutes
- Country: India
- Language: Malayalam
- Box office: ₹9.03 crore (US$940,000)

Ronth (transl. Patrol) is a 2025 Indian Malayalam crime thriller film written and directed by Shahi Kabir and produced by Vineet Jain, Rathish Ambat, Renjith EVM, and Jojo Jose, under Junglee Pictures and Festival Cinemas. It stars Dileesh Pothan and Roshan Mathew in the lead roles. The film is a spiritual successor to and set in the same creative universe as 2021 film Nayattu.

== Plot ==
Ronth is the story of Sub‑Inspector Yohannan and rookie cop Dinanath as they patrol the city at night and attend to various cases like a suicide, a mentally unstable violent man terrorizing neighbors, domestic violence, and the elopement of a girl from a wealthy family with a boy from a poor family. Dinanath's father died by suicide, and the incident left him traumatized. Yohannan and his wife had a stillbirth, which made his wife mentally unstable. He is the sole caregiver for his wife. Dinanath lacks experience and reacts emotionally to situations. At the same time, Yohannan, a seasoned police officer, is both frustrated and amused by Dinanath's inexperience. The wealthy and influential family of the girl who eloped with her boyfriend kills one of the daughter's boyfriend's friend, and Yohannan and Dinanath are framed for the murder by their superior, who is a friend of the influential family. Dinanath panics when he is arrested and runs away, but gets hit by a truck that kills him instantly, while Yohannan vows to fight for his innocence in court.

== Cast ==
- Dileesh Pothan as Grade SI Yohannan
- Roshan Mathew as CPO Dinanath
- Arun Cherukavil as DYSP Jacob J.
- Roshan Abdul Rahoof as Roshan
- Krisha Kurup as Anu
- Lakshmi Menon as Salomi
- Carmen S. Mathew as Jincy
- Sajan Sebastian as Grade SI, Anil Mohan
- Kumaradas T. N. as GD ASI Sadanandan
- Kochouseph Chittilappilly as Dr. Jacob Thomas
- Nandutty as Molutty
- Akhila Nath as Woman CPO, Jasmine
- Sudhi Koppa as Pastor (cameo appearance)
- Rajesh Madhavan (cameo appearance) as CPO's husband
- Kunchako Boban as CPO Praveen Michael (photo only; Archived from Nayattu)
- Nimisha Sajayan as WCPO Sunitha (photo only; Archived from Nayattu)

== Release ==
=== Theatrical ===
Ronth was released theatrically on 13 June 2025.

=== Home media ===
The film digitally released on the streaming platform JioHotstar from 22 July 2025 in Malayalam, along with dubbed versions in Tamil, Telugu, Kannada, and Hindi.

== Reception ==
=== Critical reception ===
Ronth received positive reviews from critics.

Rohit Panikker of Filmfare gave 4/5 stars and wrote "Ronth isn’t here to thrill. It’s here to haunt. It’s a quiet, unhurried, and deeply unsettling portrait of what it means to patrol the line between order and morality—and what happens when that line begins to blur." Sajin Shrijith of The Week gave 4/5 and wrote "Ronth contains what I would call the career-best performances of Dileesh Pothan and Roshan Mathew. In Ronth, the characters venture to the exteriors, to areas that are either desolate, haunting or breathtakingly beautiful (captured effectively by cinematographer Manesh Madhavan). There is a strong sense of alienation following these two characters." Manjusha Radhakrishnan of Gulf News gave 4/5 and wrote, "Movies like Ronth remind you that what stays with you isn't star power or action set pieces — it's powerful performances, moral complexity, and a sense of truth. Ronth — which means 'patrol' — is a film that will haunt you."

Anandu Suresh of The Indian Express gave 3.5/5 and wrote "Shahi makes an even more meticulous use of the narrative element, crafting a story in which the khaki-clad metaphorical hunters, through moments of peripeteia, become the hunted." Vignesh Madhu of The New Indian Express gave 3.5/5 and wrote "Through two conflicting cops on patrol duty, Shahi Kabir succeeds in crafting yet another layered police story with hard-hitting socio-political commentary." Gopika I. S. of The Times of India gave 3.5/5 and wrote "Ronth is yet another haunting, thought-provoking police drama from Shahi Kabir. His own experience as a police officer clearly informs the authenticity and intensity of this story."

Nirali Kanabar of Times Now wrote "Ronth is a powerful tale that goes beyond the genre tropes, delivering a deeply human story. The way it draws parallels between the characters' professional duties and personal struggles is subtle and impactful. Watch it for a great theatrical experience." S. R. Praveen of The Hindu wrote "With ‘Ronth’, director Shahi Kabir continues to tap into his experiences in the police department, mining uncommon stories which paint an unflattering picture of the force." Swathi P. Ajith of Malayala Manorama wrote "'Ronth' is worth a watch. It holds your attention from start to finish, with each small incident adding a layer to the whole."

=== Box office ===
Ronth collected ₹5 crore within its first 3 days of release.
