= Anil Johnson =

Indian keyboard programmer and composer

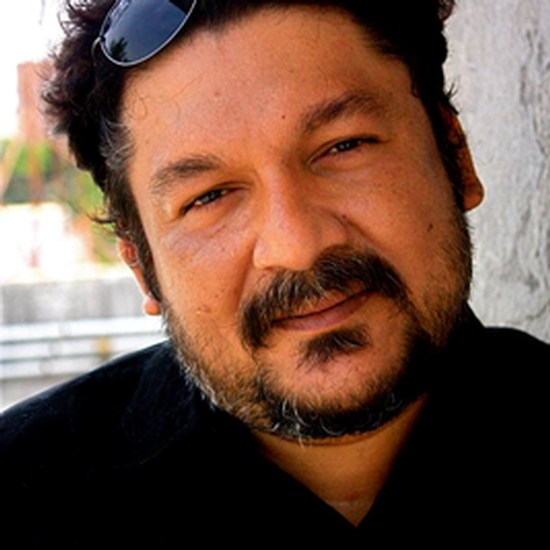
- Anil Johnson

Background information
- Born: 24 March 1973 (age 53); Kochi, Kerala, India
- Genres: Film score; classical music
- Occupations: Music composer; Songwriter; Record Producer
- Instruments: Piano, Synthesisers, Hand percussion

Anil Johnson is an Indian film composer and record producer who works in Malayalam cinema. Besides feature films, he has composed for commercials, documentaries, corporate films, short films and music videos. Prior to becoming a mainstream score composer, he worked as an arranger for several other composers and bands in the Indian music industry. He had also directed television commercials in the mid-2000s.

== Filmography ==
Year	Title	Director	Songs	Score	Notes
2013	3 Dots	Sugeeth	No	Yes	
2013	Memories	Jeethu Joseph	No	Yes	
2013	Drishyam	Jeethu Joseph	Yes	Yes	
2014	Onnum Mindaathe	Sugeeth	Yes	Yes	
2015	Life of Josutty	Jeethu Joseph	Yes	Yes	
2016	Oozham	Jeethu Joseph	Yes	Yes	
2016	Olappeeppi	Krish Kaimal	Yes	Yes	
2017	Aby	Srikant Murali	No	Yes	
2017	Lakshyam	Anzar Khan	No	Yes	
2017	Aadhi	Jeethu Joseph	Yes	Yes	
2018	Joseph	M Padmakumar	No	Yes	
2019	Mr. & Ms. Rowdy	Jeethu Joseph	No	Yes	
2019	MEI	SA Baaskar	No	Yes	Tamil film
2021	Drishyam 2	Jeethu Joseph	Yes	Yes	
2021	Visithiran	M Padmakumar	No	Yes	Tamil film
2022	Unlock	Sohan Seenulal	No	Yes	
2022	12th Man	Jeethu Joseph	Yes	Yes	
2022	Ela Veezha Poonchira	Shahi Kabeer	No	Yes	
2022	Aalankam	Shani Khader	No	Yes	
2023	Pulimada	A. K. Sajan	No	Yes	
2024	Big Ben	Bino Augustine	No	Yes	
2025	Ronth	Shahi Kabir	Yes	Yes	
2026	Drishyam 3 †	Jeethu Joseph	Yes	Yes	

== Awards and nominations ==
Award	Year	Project	Category	Outcome
Movie Street Film Award	2019	Joseph	Best Background Score	Won
