= Operation Tral =

- Directed by: Ratheesh Vega
- Written by: Ratheesh Vega
- Produced by: Joby George Thadathil
- Starring: Jayasurya; Vinay Rai; Amyra Dastur; Murali Sharma; Vikram Kochhar
- Cinematography: Naveen Najose
- Edited by: Shafeeque V.B.
- Music by: Ratheesh Vega
- Production company: Goodwill Entertainments
- Release date: 4 December 2026
- Country: India
- Language: Malayalam

Operation Tral is a 2026 Malayalam-language film written and directed by Ratheesh Vega under the banner of Goodwill Entertainments. The film stars Jayasurya, Ritika Singh, and Vinay Rai in lead roles. Other cast include Vikram Kochhar, Kavya Shetty, Siddique, Saikumar, Anson Paul, Manju Pillai, Yash Gera, Hansika Bharat Jangid, Akshay Radhakrishnan, Sirajudheen Nazar, Neethu Krishna, Bashid Basheer, and Joel Jo George.

== Cast ==
- Vinay Rai
- Jayasurya
- Amyra Dastur
- Ritika Singh
- Kavya Shetty
- Anson Paul
- Murali Sharma
- Vikram Kochhar
- Siddique
- Sai Kumar
- Tarun Arora
- Neethu Krishna

== Production ==
=== Development ===
The film was announced by the makers on 16 March 2026 with a title teaser. Ratheesh Vega and Jayasurya teamed up for the project with the title "Operation Tral". The film marks music director Vega's directorial debut.

A first look teaser was released on 25 April 2026.

=== Casting ===
Jayasurya plays role of a NIA officer while Vinay Rai plays role of an army officer. Ritika Singh, Amyra Dastur, Siddique, Sai Kumar, Nandu, and Anson Paul were also finalised as part of the cast. ON 10 August 2026, the makers confirmed that Murali Sharma was also part of the cast.

=== Filming ===
Principal photography commenced on 18 May 2026 with a puja ceremony at Crowne Plaza of Kochi. The film was extensively shot in Kerala, Coimbatore, New Delhi, Kullu, Manali, Mussoorie and Ladakh. Filming concluded in early August 2026, after shooting for 3 months.

=== Marketing ===
A teaser was released on 26 August 2026.

== Music ==
The music and the background score were composed by Ratheesh Vegha. The first song "Jai Ho" was released on 15 August 2026, where the lyrics was penned by Irshad Dalal, composed by and sung by Sudhir Yaduvanshi.

== Release ==
The film is slated to release in December 2026.

== Controversy ==
On 2 September 2026, Sound designer Ajayan Adat posted a comment as reply to a teaser video, shared by the film's sound designer R.S. Vicky on Instagram, accusing the film as RSS backed propaganda. Immidietly the makers of the film issued a press release stating that the film is not any propaganda but inspired by real-incident which tells the story of Indian security forces who gave up their lives for the country.
