= Srikant Murali =

Indian filmmaker and actor (born 1976)

- Born: 3 October 1971 (age 54)
- Education: Mahatma Gandhi University, Kerala
- Occupations: Director; actor; filmmaker
- Years active: 1988–present
- Spouse: Sangeeta Srikant
- Children: 1

Srikant Murali (also spelt Srikanth Murali) is an Indian actor, director and ad filmmaker. He has acted in Malayalam films such as Home (2021), Aby (2017), Virus (2019) and Action Hero Biju (2016). As an ad filmmaker Srikant has created material in various Indian languages.

== Career ==
Srikant started his career with K. G. George as his assistant in the year 1988, when he was 16 years. After completing his graduation in Chemistry from M G University, Srikant Murali himself started doing short films and documentaries for DD TVM in 1992. Hails from a traditional Kerala family, he is a well trained Kadhakali artist, proved his caliber both in art and literature during his school and college days. Srikant has joined as assistant to Mr Priyadarshan, the ace film director and producer in the year 1996, and worked with him for his all film ventures until 2006. He started working as a free lance film maker, later launched his own production house called “Mindscape productions” in 2008.

In 2016 he has started his acting career. In 2017 in his directorial debut Aby he portrayed the life of Saji Mathew who wants to fly an aeroplane. The movie depicts how the hero struggles to make his dream come true and the obstacles he faces on his way to success and achieve glory. Srikant also has worked in popular movies like Chathur Mukham, Forensic, Under World and Ente Mezhuthiri Athazhangal etc.

Srikant has also worked as the eviction director for Bigg Boss Malayalam Season 1 and Season 2.

== Filmography ==
=== As director ===
Year	Title	Note
2017	Aby	Directional Debut
2022	Untitled Indrajith Sukumaran film	Announced

=== As actor ===
Year	Title	Role	Notes
2016	Action Hero Biju	Adv. Jayakrishnan	
2017	Aana Alaralodalaral	Jamaludeen	
2017	Thondimuthalum Driksakshiyum	Murali	
2017	Oru Cinemakkaran	Fr. Kuriachan	
2018	Mandharam	Charu's Uncle	
2018	Ente Mezhuthiri Athazhangal	Narayanan Nair	
2018	Kuttanpillayude Sivarathri	Fr. Rodriguez	
2018	Ira	Dr. V.K. Madhavan	
2019	Vijay Superum Pournamiyum	Event Manager	
2019	Helen	Dr. Cyriac John	
2019	Nalpathiyonnu	Narayan Swami	
2019	Under World	Potti	
2019	Sathyam Paranja Viswasikkuvo	S.I Aboobhakkar	
2019	Kakshi: Amminippilla	Judge Mathan	
2019	Kalki	Rival (leftist) party leader	
2019	Luca	Jayaprakash	
2019	Virus	Dr. Moopan	
2019	Neeyum Njanum	Nampiri Mash	
2020	Forensic	SP Issac IPS, Crime Branch	
2020	Anveshanam	Dr. Ashok	
2021	Vaanku		
2021	Krishnankutty Pani Thudangi	Krishnankutty	
2021	Mohan Kumar Fans	Nandakishor	
2021	Chathur Mukham	Philip Tharian	
2021	Say No to Dowry	The father	Malayalam Short Film by FEFKA
2021	Home	Joseph Lopez	Released in Amazon Prime
2022	19(1)(A)	Gangettan	
2022	Madappally United	Adv. Prakash	
2023	Thankam	Mani Kurup	
2023	Iratta	DySP Satheesh Chandran	
2023	Kallanum Bhagavathiyum		
2023	Corona Papers		
2023	Valatty	Swamy	
2023	Kurukkan	Judge	
2023	Oruvattam Koodi	Dr. Salil Varma	
2023	Theeppori Benny	Shekharan	
2023	Master Peace	Jose Kumar	Disney+ Hotstar Web series
2023	Dhootha	Charles	Prime Web series
2023	Antony	CI Pramod	
2023	Rajni	Krishnan	Malayalam/Tamil film
2023	Bullet Diaries		
2024	Golam	Commissioner Babu Thomas IPS	
2024	Swargathile Katturumbu		
2024	Partners		
2024	Chithini		
2025	Rekhachithram	Forensic Surgeon	
2025	Moonwalk		
2025	Officer on Duty	ASI Venu	
2025	Meesha		
2026	Spa		
2026	Drishyam 3	Public Prosecutor	
2026	Uyir		
TBA	Ottakkomban †	TBA	Upcoming Movie
TBA	The Secret of Women †	TBA	Upcoming Movie
TBA	Bermuda †	TBA	Upcoming Movie
