= Manesh Madhavan =

Indian cinematographer

Personal details
- Born: Ernakulam, India
- Education: Film and Television Institute of India, Pune
- Occupation: Cinematographer, Writer
- Website: www.maneshmadhavan.com

Manesh Madhavan is an Indian cinematographer. He graduated from Film and Television Institute of India, Pune.

== Career ==
He is an alumnus of Berlinale Talent Campus at 58th Berlin International Film Festival 2008. A student of Polish Filmmaker Andrzej Wajda, Ellen Kuras ASC (At Berlinale 2008) and Santosh Sivan (at FTII Pune) and his credits includes feature films, documentaries, short films, advertisement films and music videos. He also worked as a Director of Photography for the Diploma Film of the famous University of California, Los Angeles (UCLA) the United States of America. He won the Kerala State Film Award for Cinematographer in 2018 for the movie Aedan

== Filmography ==
=== As cinematographer ===
Year	Title	Language	Notes
2009	Aadmi Ki Aurat Aur Anya Kahaniya	Hindi	
2011	Green Bangles	Hindi	Short film
2012	Gundert the Man the Language	Malayalam	
2012	Afterglow	English	Short film
2014	Kapila	Malayalam	Documentary
2014	Garass	Hindi	Short film
2015	A Poet a City and a Footballer	Bengali	Documentary
2016	Daftar	Hindi	
2016	Tree Of Tongues in Tripura	Malayalam	
2017	Samarpanam	Malayalam	
2018	Padmini	Malayalam	
2018	Aedan- Garden of Desire	Malayalam	Won 'Rajatha Chakoram for the Best Debut Director' at 22nd IFFK. Kerala State Award for Best Cinematography
2018	Joseph	Malayalam	
2021	19(1)(A)	Malayalam	
2022	Ela Veezha Poonchira	Malayalam	Kerala State Award for Best Cinematographer
2022	Wonder Women	English	
2023	Vaathil	Malayalam	
2024	Perumani	Malayalam	
2025	Ariku	Malayalam	
2025	Ronth	Malayalam	

=== As writer ===
Year	Film	Language	Notes
2016	Tree Of Tongues in Tripura	Malayalam	Feature film
