= Aadhi =

2018 Malayalam chase film by Jeethu Joseph

- International poster (GCC)
- Directed by: Jeethu Joseph
- Written by: Jeethu Joseph
- Produced by: Antony Perumbavoor
- Starring: Pranav Mohanlal; Jagapathi Babu; Siddique; Lena; Aditi Ravi; Anusree
- Cinematography: Satheesh Kurup
- Edited by: Ayoob Khan
- Music by: Anil Johnson
- Production company: Aashirvad Cinemas
- Distributed by: Maxlab Cinemas and Entertainments
- Release date: 26 January 2018 (India)
- Running time: 160 minutes
- Country: India
- Language: Malayalam
- Box office: est. ₹50 crore

Aadhi is a 2018 Indian Malayalam-language action thriller film directed by Jeethu Joseph and produced by Antony Perumbavoor through Aashirvad Cinemas. The film stars Pranav Mohanlal in the title role (in his debut role) and with an ensemble cast including Jagapathi Babu, Siddique, Lena, Aditi Ravi, Anusree, Sharaf U Dheen, Siju Wilson, Meghanathan, Sijoy Varghese, Tony Luke and Krishna Shankar. The original soundtrack for the film was composed by Anil Johnson.

The principal photography took place between August and November 2017 in Kochi, Bangalore, and Hyderabad.

Aadhi was released in India on 26 January 2018 and met with positive response for its story, action sequences and performances The film was a major commercial success, becoming one of the highest-grossing Malayalam films of 2018.

== Plot ==
Aadhi is a talented young musician struggling to find his big break in the film industry. While his mother, Rosy, is his biggest supporter, his father, Mohan Varma, remains skeptical, hoping Aadhi will eventually commit to a stable career in the family business. Beyond his music, Aadhi is a skilled practitioner of parkour, a passion his mother particularly disapproves of due to its physical risks.

The conflict begins when Mohan asks Aadhi to travel to Bengaluru to pick up his friend Roy from the airport. While waiting, Aadhi visits a popular nightclub frequented by influential music industry figures. During his visit, a tragic accident occurs: the son of a powerful business tycoon, Narayana Reddy, dies under suspicious circumstances. A man named Jayakrishnan, who is actually responsible for the incident, frames Aadhi for the death. Driven by grief and rage, Reddy uses his vast influence to launch a ruthless underground manhunt for Aadhi, ordering his henchmen to capture him at any cost.

Aadhi finds himself on the run in an unfamiliar city, relying on his parkour skills to evade Reddy’s men. He eventually crosses paths with Sharath, a man who harbors a deep grudge against Reddy for destroying his own family. Sympathetic to Aadhi’s plight, Sharath, along with his sister and their friend Mani Annan, agrees to help him hide. Despite their best efforts to plan an escape, the net closes in as Reddy’s men begin tracking Aadhi’s communications with his parents.

Jayakrishnan, realizing that Sharath is protecting Aadhi, murders Sharath before he can expose the truth. This tragedy forces Aadhi to change his strategy. Realizing that Jayakrishnan orchestrated the entire frame-up to save his own skin, Aadhi teams up with Mani Annan and Ebin, a former employee of Reddy’s "Pinnacle Group," to infiltrate Reddy’s office and retrieve the security footage that will prove his innocence.

Aadhi and his accomplice, Anjana, successfully bypass security and confront Reddy. Aadhi manages to convince the tycoon of the truth, but before they can act, Jayakrishnan arrives with his partner, Siddhu. A violent confrontation ensues, during which Jayakrishnan and Siddhu reveal their true motive: they intended to kill Reddy all along to seize his wealth. A chaotic struggle follows, resulting in the deaths of the two traitors.

The climax leads to a daring escape from the high-rise building, during which Aadhi uses his parkour expertise to survive an explosion and secure his freedom. Ultimately, Reddy learns the truth, and Aadhi is cleared of all charges, finally allowing him to return to his life and musical aspirations.

== Cast ==
- Pranav Mohanlal as Aditya Mohan / Aadhi
- Jagapathi Babu as Narayana Reddy
- Siddique as Mohan Varma, Aadhi's father
- Lena as Rosy, Aadhi's mother
- Aditi Ravi as Anjana, Aadhi's classmate
- Anusree as Jaya, Sarath's elder sister
- Sijoy Varghese as Siddharth / Siddhu
- Siju Wilson as Jayakrishnan
- Meghanathan as Mani Annan
- Sharaf U Dheen as Sarath Nair
- Tony Luke as Ebin
- Krishna Shankar as Nadhir, Aadhi's friend
- Kritika Pradeep as Anu, a girl who has a crush on Aadhi
- Mohanlal as Himself (Cameo appearance)
- Antony Perumbavoor as Himself (Cameo appearance)
- James Pottackal as Man walking in GCDA (Cameo appearance)
- Jeethu Joseph as Man walking in street (Cameo appearance)
- Roy C. J. as Himself (Cameo appearance)
- Nithin Hari as Reddy's Son

== Production ==
=== Development ===
On 30 September 2016, Mohanlal announced that his son Pranav Mohanlal would be acting in a film directed by Jeethu Joseph and produced by Aashirvad Cinemas, which would be a thriller. The film marks the return of Pranav as an actor, who had earlier appeared as child actor. He had worked with Jeethu as an assistant director in two films—Papanasam and Life of Josutty. The project was green-lit a few days before the announcement when Jeethu had a discussion with Pranav. After learning Pranav wanted to return to acting, Jeethu approached him with an abstract idea of a film and received positive feedback.

Jeethu was in charge of writing; he had completed the story by the time of the announcement and had begun writing the screenplay, intending it to be his next directorial. He described the film as an action movie and a thriller, but it will not resemble a thriller like his 2013 film Memories. Jeethu had developed the story idea during his college education. His protagonist was a marathon or cross country runner, whose athletic skills aid him in the story. For the film, it was changed to parkour since Pranav had learned it during his academic life. The entire plot takes place within one week or 10 days. By the end of March 2017, Jeethu said he was working on the script and hoped to start filming by June, with the rest of the cast finalizing after the first draft is prepared. In early May, Jeethu confirmed that the first draft was complete and they were about to enter pre-production, with the filming planned to begin in the second half of 2017. In mid-May he stated that he is still working on the screenplay.

In early July 2017, Jeethu said he intended to start filming by the end of that month. For the film, Pranav trained in parkour. The title Aadhi along with an animated digital poster were revealed on 5 July at the puja function of the film held at hotel Vivanta by Taj in Thycaud, Thiruvananthapuram. The venue was shared with the puja of Aashirvad Cinemas's Odiyan. Aadhi is billed with the tagline, "some lies can be deadly". Satheesh Kurup was signed as the cinematographer, while Anil Johnson as music composer.

=== Casting ===
Pranav plays Aadhi, an urban youth who loves music and aspires to become a music director. Although Pranav was described about his character, Jeethu gave him freedom to mould the character accordingly. In August 2017, Siddique, Sharaf U Dheen, and Siju Wilson were confirmed in prominent roles. Initially Sunny Wayne was signed for a role but had to cancel because of scheduling conflicts. The film has no romantic track. The leading female roles were played by Anusree, Aditi Ravi, and Lena. Aditi plays Anjana, a Bangalore-based Malayali banking professional. She was suggested to Jeethu by cinematographer Satheesh Kurup, who worked in her debut film Alamara; Aditi was cast after a screen test. Siddique and Lena play Aadhi's father and mother. Also in August 2017, confirming his presence, Tony Luke shared his character look on a social networking site, sporting a thick beard. By the end of the month, Jagapati Babu was confirmed to be in the cast in a significant role.

=== Filming ===
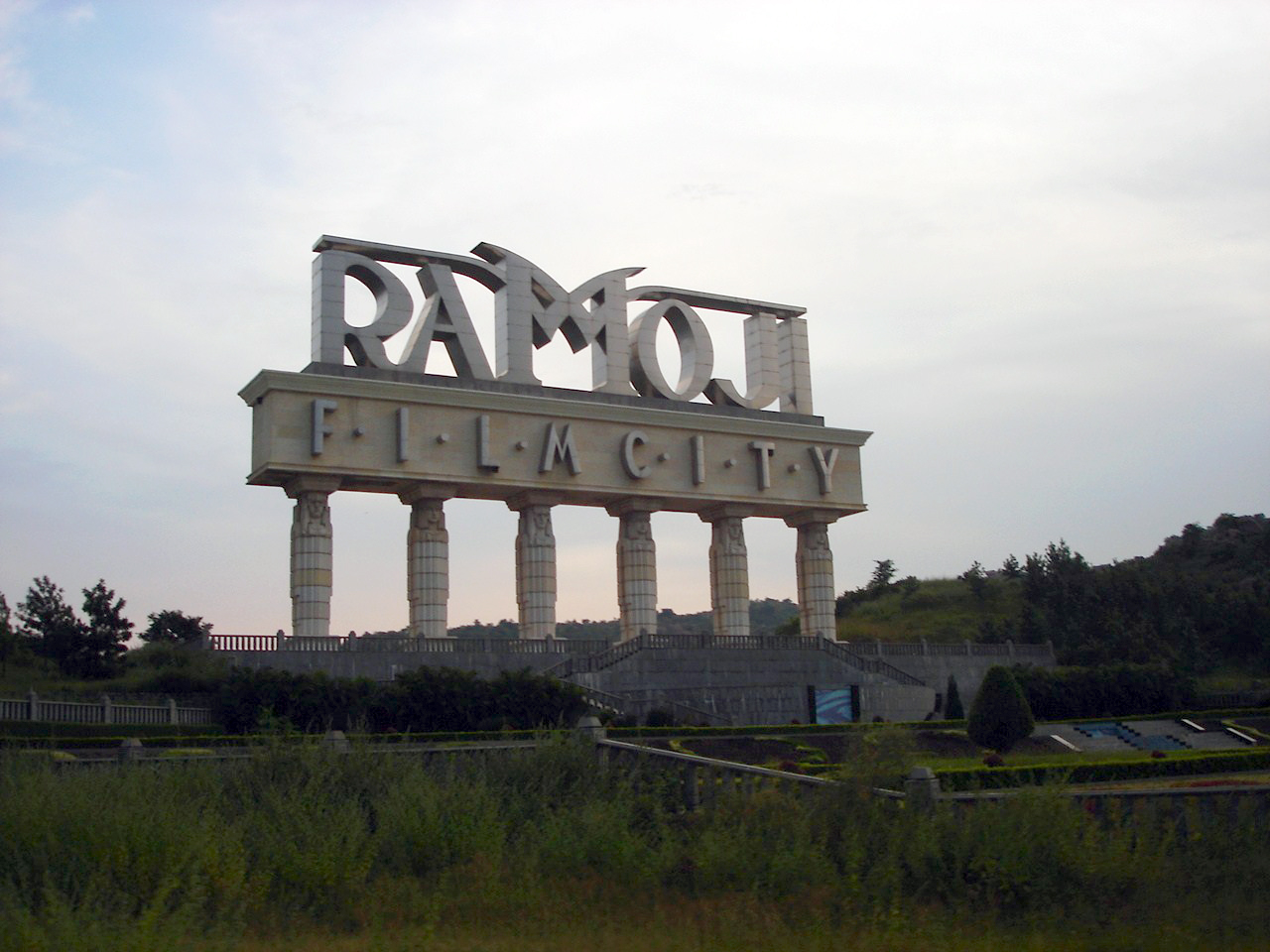
Ramoji Film City, where parts of the film was shot.

Preliminary principal photography commenced on 5 July 2017 at hotel Vivanta by Taj in Thycaud, Thiruvananthapuram after a puja function held at the same venue—it was a single brief shot featuring Pranav. The regular filming began on 1 August 2017 in Nedumbassery, Kochi. Pranav was seen playing a guitar in the scene stills taken on the day. Early in this schedule, some scenes were filmed inside a studio near Pathadipalam in Kochi, inside which a house was created in set. Pranav and Anusree were present in that segment. The first schedule in Kochi continued until 10 August and the second schedule began in Bangalore the following week. The schedule was expected to continue until mid-September and then shift to Hyderabad by the end of the month.

In early September, Jeethu said the crew had already filmed two songs of the three songs. The unit finished filming in Bangalore and shifted to Hyderabad earlier than scheduled due to rain. Filming began at Ramoji Film City in Hyderabad from 3 September; the scenes including an office, a building, a club, and a dance bar had originally been planned for Bangalore but were shot in Ramoji Film City instead. The schedule in Ramoji Film City was planned for 20 days. The film also had location shooting in a few streets in Hyderabad. Pranav, Aditi, and Anusree took part in this schedule. Jeethu's spouse Linta Jeethu was the film's costume designer.

Pranav received the screenplay early and had several discussions with Jeethu, who said, "because he has been through the script so many times, he is able to add his improvisations" and "directing him has been a seamless experience". By the end of September 2017, Jeethu said they had one month of shoot left in Hyderabad and would soon film the action scenes, for which a foreign stunt director would join the unit. After completing the action scenes, the crew would shift again between Kochi and Bangalore. On 23 October, the unit returned to Kochi to begin the final phase of filming; the climax scenes were shot in the next two days.

Pranav was injured while breaking glass for a scene. While performing an action scene in Kochi, Pranav's finger bruised and bled; he was taken to a hospital and was prescribed two days' rest. The crew had only three days of filming left and were about to return to Hyderabad for the weekend. Since the upcoming action scenes require many hand movements, filming was postponed to the next week. They were permitted to shoot only at weekends. When the first poster of the film was released on 4 November, Jeethu wrote on his social networking page that the final phase of filming was progressing in Hyderabad. Filming was wrapped on 8 November 2017.

=== Music ===
Aadhi

Soundtrack album by Anil Johnson
- Released: 26 January 2018
- Recorded: 2017
- Venues: Kochi, Chennai
- Studios: Blacknoise Studio; 20 dB Studios
- Genre: Feature film soundtrack
- Label: Goodwill Entertainments
- Producer: Anil Johnson

Anil Johnson chronology
Lakshyam (2017)	Aadhi (2018)	Joseph (2018)

Anil Johnson composed the music for the film, it features three songs. Besides acting, Pranav made his debut as a playback singer and songwriter with a retro English track in the film. When Jeethu asked, Pranav expressed interest in writing and singing the track that appears in a live performance scene in the film. He also played the guitar. Johnson was confident of Pranav's singing and guitar skills. Titling the song, finalizing the tune, and recording, was done in Kochi after Pranav returned from the final filming schedule in Hyderabad. "Sooryane", a single from the film was released by Goodwill Entertainments label on 5 January 2018 for digital download and as music video on YouTube. It was sung by Najim Arshad and written by Santhosh Varma. The music work was done at Blacknoise studio in Kochi and 20 dB Studios in Chennai.

Aadhi (Original Motion Picture Soundtrack)
No.	Title	Writer(s)	Singer	Length
1.	"Gypsy Women"	Pranav Mohanlal	Pranav Mohanlal	3:35
2.	"Sooryane"	Santhosh Varma	Najim Arshad	4:14
3.	"Piriyum Naam"	Santhosh Varma	Najim Arshad	3:36
4.	"Gypsy Women" (Karaoke Version)			4:01
5.	"Sooryane" (Karaoke Version)			4:14
6.	"Piriyum Naam" (Karaoke Version)			3:36

== Release ==
The makers initially targeted a release by Christmas 2017, but in August that year, Jeethu confirmed the film would not be released at Christmas because filming was expected to finish by October and the film would have an extensive post-production. In early November 2017, Jeethu stated they had a few more days of filming left but had already begun the post-production work to ensure a release by the end of January 2018. Release date was confirmed in December 2017. Aadhi released in India on 26 January 2018.

=== Critical reception ===
Aadhi opened to positive response from critics.

Anna M. M. Vetticad of Firstpost rated 3.5/5 stars and wrote "Aadhi is one of the most exciting rollercoaster rides ever to emerge from Malayalam cinema." Meera Suresh of The New Indian Express gave 3.5/5 stars and called it "an impressive debut from Pranav", stating that "With mind-boggling action sequences and enough screen presence, Mohanlal's son makes a comfortable debut, winning us with his charisma."

G. Ragesh of Malayala Manorama gave 3.5/5 stars and wrote "Aadhi is tailor-made for the entry of Pranav Mohanlal into the world of stardom and the writer-director has done everything possible to keep the fans of the superstar in good spirits." Sify gave 3/5 stars and wrote "Aadhi is an entertaining journey of a youth, which gives you some edge of the seat moments with his action skills. Jeethu Joseph has evidently tried to keep the viewers engaged using a fast-paced presentation."

Manoj Kumar R. of The Indian Express gave 3/5 stars and wrote "Pranav's performance in action sequences is one of the mainstays in the film. Shot in real locations, Pranav draws applause for his skills in free running or popularly known as Parkour." Deccan Chronicle gave 3/5 stars and said the film is "A high-octane, action-packed drama keeps audience, irrespective of ages, engaged." Deepa Soman of The Times of India gave 3/5 stars and wrote "Aadhi deserves your time if you can look past the familiarity of the story, and want to enjoy a mix of Mohanlal nostalgia, stunts and the genuine efforts of a newbie actor to breathe life into his debut character."

=== Box office ===
The film was a commercial success at the box office, becoming one of the highest-grossing Malayalam films of the year. It grossed ₹50 Crore from the box office worldwide and ran over 100 days in theatres. In the opening weekend (9–11 February), the film grossed $42,907 (₹32.19 lakh) from 38 screens in the United States and £2,666 from two theatres in the United Kingdom. It collected £25,583 (₹23.19 lakh) from 94 screens in the UK in the second week. In four weeks, the film grossed $85,982 (₹55.98 lakh) in the US and £50,571 (₹45.34 lakh) in the UK. In the opening weekend (15–18 February), it grossed $403,843 from 41 screens in the United Arab Emirates (UAE)—second best opener of that weekend (behind Black Panther) and $9,557 from 3 screens in New Zealand. It collected $526,393 from the UAE in four weeks and $10,851 from New Zealand in two weeks. Three week gross in New Zealand was NZ$14,875.

=== Awards ===
Pranav won the Best Debut Actor award at the 8th South Indian International Movie Awards (SIIMA). Lena also won the SIIMA Award for Best Actress in a Supporting Role. Anusree won the award for Best Character Actress at the 21st Asianet Film Awards.
