= Meesha (film) =

Indian Malayalam-language action thriller film

- Theatrical release poster
- Directed by: Emcy Joseph
- Written by: Emcy Joseph
- Starring: Kathir; Hakim Shahjahan; Shine Tom Chacko
- Cinematography: Suresh Rajan
- Edited by: Manoj
- Music by: Sooraj S. Kurup
- Production company: Unicorn Movies
- Release date: 1 August 2025
- Country: India
- Language: Malayalam

Meesha (transl. Moustache) is a 2025 Indian Malayalam-language action thriller film directed by Emcy Joseph and starring Kathir (in his Malayalam film debut), Hakim Shahjahan and Shine Tom Chacko. The film was released on 1 August 2025 to mixed reviews.

== Cast ==
- Kathir as Mithun
- Hakim Shahjahan as Anandhu
- Shine Tom Chacko as Kitho
- Sudhi Koppa as Imod
- Srikant Murali
- Jeo Baby
- Hasli Amaan
- Unni Lal

== Production ==
The film was initially titled Kombu. According to the director, the film is about shades of gray in male friendships, which don't include toxic masculinity.

== Soundtrack ==
The music was composed by Sooraj S. Kurup.

| No. | Title | Lyrics | Singer(s) | Length |
|---|---|---|---|---|
| 1. | "Moustache" | The Imbachi, Sooraj S. Kurup | The Imbachi, Sooraj S. Kurup | 2:29 |
| 2. | "Thee Veyil" | Shabareesh Varma | Arvind Venugopal, Chinmayi Kiranlal, Minya P Panikkar, Manita P Panikkar, Aavani Malhar, Krithikha S, Jerine Anna, Lal Krishna, Akhil Dev | 3:21 |
| 3. | "Meesha Trance" | Sooraj S. Kurup | Sooraj S. Kurup | 3:04 |
| 4. | "Neriye" | Dhanya Suresh Menon | Anthony Daasan, Anila Rajeev | 3:42 |
| 5. | "Kadalayi" | Dhanya Suresh Menon, Souparnika Rajagopal | Job Kurian, Souparnika Rajagopal | 3:31 |
| 6. | "Kaathe Kaalam" | Dhanya Suresh Menon | Pranavya Das, Pavithra Das, Nandhagopan V, Sunil | 3:43 |
| Total length: | | | | 19:50 |

== Reception ==
Vishal Menon of The Hollywood Reporter India wrote, "More than the plot, it's Anandhu and Mithun, who deserved a better film and ending worthy of their friendship". Vignesh Madhu of the Cinema Express rated the film 2/5 stars and wrote, "At a time when mainstream films largely celebrate male friendships, it is refreshing to see someone going the extra mile to examine it from a different lens. Yet, it feels like an opportunity lost... in the wild". A critic from OnManorama wrote, "The film's absorbing premises and compelling characters, along with a gripping style of storytelling, keep you engrossed, though the narrative falls flat at times". Gayathri Krishna of OTTplay rated the film 3.5/5 stars and wrote, "The action thriller, which is set in a forest, is a compelling flick that explores friendship and the urge to give up the ones you value about the most in order to pursue your goals".
