= Rajesh Cherthala =

Indian musician

- Born: Rajesh Kumar MD; 9 June 1978 (age 48); Cherthala, Alappuzha district, Kerala, India
- Origin: India
- Genres: Carnatic; Hindustani; Western
- Occupation: Musician
- Instrument: Flute
- Years active: 2004 - Present
- Website: http://rajeshcherthala.in/

Rajesh Cherthala (born 9 June 1978) is a musician and flutist from Cherthala, Kerala, in India, who has been recorded on more than 150 Indian film songs. He is known for his live performances of fusion music incorporating a variety of genres like Western, Carnatic and Hindustani.

== Personal life ==
Rajesh was born as eldest son of Cherthala Math Dasappan and Nirmala in Cherthala, Alappuzha district, Kerala. He studied at St. Mathews High School, Kannankara and SN College, Cherthala. His parents encouraged him to learn music in his childhood days.

His wife is Raji Rajesh. They have two daughters Amala. R.Das and Amrutha.R.Das.

== Career ==
His first teacher was an artist named 'Sunbright' from Puthanangadi, Cherthala. Pandit Hariprasad Chaurasia is his Guru now. He studies flute at Chaurasya's Vrindavan Gurukul in Mumbai, staying with him. His first studio recording was that conducted by violinist Thiruvizha Ullas at Kalabhavan Kochi, Rajesh was introduced into cinema by Jassie Gift, one of the well-known Malayalam playback singers from Kerala, in 2004. Later, he went on to play for over 300 films, completing more than 1,000 songs (not to include the albums).

== Filmography ==
Rajesh performed as an instrumentalist for the following films:

- Rain rain come again
- Aswaroodan
- Ananda bhadram
- Arabikkadha
- Nasrani
- Kavyam
- Love in Singapore
- Daddy Cool
- Minnaminni koottam
- Dam 999
- Best Actor
- Mayamohini
- Avatharam
- Jewan of Vellimala
- Rose Guitarinal
- Kaliyachan
- ABCD
- Balyakalasakhi
- Pakida
- Poly Technic
- Vedi vazhipadu
- Ring Master
- Bangalore Days
- Munnariyippu
- Mr.Fraud
- AngriBabies in Love
- Vikramadityan
- Manglish
- Low point
- varsham
- Ithihas
- Ormayundo Ee Mukham
- Abhiyum Njanum
- Sworgathekkal Sundaram
- Bhaskar the Rascal
- Loham
- Mathai kuzhappakkaranalla
- Kanthari
- Chirakodinja Kinavukal
- Lukka Chuppy
- Oru Second class Yatra
- Premam
- KL10
- Anarkkali
- RaniPadmini
- SheeTaxy
- pathemary
- Sarathi
- Vellimoonga
- Left RIGHT left
- Kammath & Kammathñ
- Janapriyan
- Palery Manikyam
- Da ...Thadiya
- Thathwamasi
- Veeraputran
- Veendum Kannr
- Bavuttiyude namathil
- Chennaiyil Orunal
- Jileby

== Television Episodes ==
- Comedy Super Nite – 2

== Awards ==
- Baba Alexander New Delhi honoring Social Activist Award 2017
- Radio Mrchi Award
