= Best Actor (film) =

- Theatrical Poster
- Directed by: Martin Prakkat
- Screenplay by: Bipin Chandran; Martin Prakatt
- Story by: Martin Prakatt
- Produced by: Naushad
- Starring: Mammootty; Sruthi Krishnan; Lal; Sreenivasan; Salim Kumar; Vinayakan; Nedumudi Venu; Joju George
- Cinematography: Ajayan Vincent
- Edited by: Don Max
- Music by: Bijibal
- Distributed by: Souparnika; Big Screen; PJ Entertainments Europe
- Release date: 9 December 2010
- Running time: 155 minutes
- Country: India
- Language: Malayalam

Best Actor is a 2010 Malayalam-language action comedy film co-written and directed by Martin Prakkat. It stars Mammootty, Sruthi Ramakrishnan, Lal, Sreenivasan, Salim Kumar, Vinayakan, Nedumudi Venu, Joju George, K. P. A. C. Lalitha, Master Sreedharan Nampoothiri and Sukumari. The film marks the debut of Prakatt as director. It was produced by Naushad under the banner of Big Screen. Several film directors made cameo appearances in the film. The film is all about the travails of a schoolteacher who dreams of being a film actor. It features cinematography by Ajayan Vincent, music by Bijibal and editing by Don Max. The film was a commercial success at the box office.

== Cast ==
- Mammootty as Mohan, a UP school teacher who wants to be an actor / Bombay, a former Mumbai-based don.
- Sruthi Ramakrishnan as Savithri, Mohan's wife and a music teacher by profession
- Lal as Vandipetta Shaji
- Sreenivasan as Film director Sreekumar
- Nedumudi Venu as Denver Aashan, the leader of a gang
- Salim Kumar as Vadival Pranchi
- Vinayakan as Pottan
- Bijukuttan as Surendran
- Master Vivas as Unnikkuttan, Mohan's son
- K. P. A. C. Lalitha
- Sukumari as Mother Superior
- Manikandan Pattambi
- Joju George as Film director
- Baiju Santhosh as police officer

=== Cameo appearances ===
- Lal Jose as himself
- Ranjith as himself
- Blessy as himself
- Vipin Mohan as himself
- K. K. Rajeev as himself
- Mafia Sasi as himself
- Sunil Sukhada
- Sreedharan Nampoothiri as a contestant
- Jijoy Rajagopal as Assistant director

== Production ==
The filming began on 6 June 2010 in Ernakulam. The first schedule was completed in various parts of Amaravila and Thrippunithura Boys High School. Second and last schedule was held at Mattancherry from 5 August onwards. The filming was completed on 9 September, with some post-production activities left. The movie was earlier titled Oru Cinemakkatha. The heroine of the film is Kannada actress Sruthi Krishnan. The film marks her debut in Malayalam cinema. According to Martin Prakatt, "This is not a cinema-within-cinema format, but it shows the world of movies from the point of view of an outsider".

== Release ==
A preview of the film was held at AVM preview theatre in Chennai. Those who watched the preview said that "it is a light hearted comedy entertainer". The film released on 9 December 2010, in 78 theatres in Kerala and in another 12 theatres outside Kerala.

== Reception ==
=== Critical response ===
Indiaglitz published a positive review saying "the movie really scores well with its fluid narratives and balancing of emotions. All in all, Mammootty and Martin Prakkat definitely have a winner in Best Actor. The movie which is almost sure to work well with the family audiences and the fans is definitely a right start for a promising director." Paresh C Palicha of Rediff rated the film 3 in a scale of 5 and commented that "the movie is watchable" and "has a very compelling feel good story." Nowrunning published an extreme positive review saying, "Best Actor is more than reason for celebration for fans of Mammootty. For the rest of us who would like to have a bit more than star charisma from his films, Martin Prakkatt has plenty to offer as well." Metromatinee also published a positive review saying, "Through Best Actor Martin Prakatt has plenty to offer as well. In his directorial debut Martin tells a simple story in a surprisingly imposing manner that does make us sit up and take note of his promising entry into films." Sify gave the movie a verdict of Above Average saying that, "Best Actor may not stir you up but could be fine, if you are there at the cinemas without much expectation. The film has its moments, but gives the feeling that it could have worked even better, if it had a better script and was approached with more passion." Reviewscreen also published a positive review and rated the film 4 in a scale of 5. They said that "The movie is a clean family entertainer. A total fun-filled movie with all the ingredients audience demanded. It is going to be one of the best movies of 2010." Mammootty received the Best Actor award from Asianet Film Awards while Nedumudi Venu won the Best Supporting Actor- Male.

=== Box office ===
The film was commercial success.

== Soundtrack ==
Best Actor

Soundtrack album by Bijibal
- Released: 27 November 2010
- Genre: Film soundtrack
- Label: Manorama Music
- Producer: Bijibal

The film score and songs were composed by Bijibal, with lyrics penned by Santhosh Varma and Sreerekha. The audio, consisting of five songs, was released by Manorama Music on 1 December 2010. The audio release function was held at Kadavu Resorts, Calicut and Mammootty presented the first copy to director V. M. Vinu.

No.	Title	Artist(s)	Length
1.	"Swapnam Oru Chak"	Arun Alat
2.	"Kanalu Malayude"	Anand Narayan, Bijibal
3.	"Machuva Eri"	Shankar Mahadevan
4.	"Katha Poloru"	Vishwajith
5.	"Swapnam Oru Chak" (Remix)	Arun Alat
6.	"Katha Poloru" (Instrumental)	Rajesh Cherthala
