= Archana 31 Not Out =

- Official Film Poster
- Directed by: Akhil Anilkumar
- Written by: Akhil Anilkumar
- Produced by: Martin Prakkat; Siby Chavara; Renjith Nair
- Starring: Aishwarya Lekshmi; Indrans; Ramesh Pisharody; Hakkim Shajahan; Sruthy Suresh; Dileep Mohan
- Cinematography: Joyal Joji
- Edited by: Nushin PM
- Music by: Rajat Prakash; Maathan
- Release date: 11 February 2022
- Country: India
- Language: Malayalam

Archana 31 Not Out is a 2022 Indian Malayalam-language comedy-drama film written and directed by Akhil Anilkumar, and produced by Martin Prakkat, Siby Chavara and Renjith Nair. The film stars Aishwarya Lekshmi, alongside Hakim Shahjahan, Dileep Mohan, Indrans and Ramesh Pisharody.

The plot revolves around the wedding of a 28-year-old school teacher named Archana, to an NRI groom takes unexpected twists. It was released on 11 February 2022 to mostly mixed reviews.

== Premise ==
Archana is a private school teacher. She goes through a tough phase as she is 28 and not married yet, also she is losing her job because of a management decision. 30 suitors have rejected Archana and 31st suitor is a NRI guy Prasad working in Gulf. His family members meet Archana and her family. Everything seems to fall in place as the engagement and subsequent marriage is fixed. Things seem to go in the right track, when just before the day of the marriage, Archana receives a call from Prasad's brother in law informing her that Prasad has eloped with a girl. With the marriage not happening, a lot of emotions go through Archana's mind. She does not reveal on Prasad eloping and the marriage stands cancelled to anyone. On the day of marriage, the ceremony goes as per the plan, but Archana reveals to her guests about Prasad's betrayal and says boldly that its not a time to cry, but be happy that the marriage with a treacherous person did not happen. The guests understand her and everyone celebrates with Archana. In the end its shown that Archana has decided to take her life in her own hands rather than worry about the society.

== Cast ==
- Aishwarya Lekshmi as Archana
- Indrans as Deity
- Hakim Shahjahan as Venu
- Dileep Mohan as Shibu (Archana's relative)
- James Varghese as Madhavan (Archana's father)
- S.K. Mini as Archana's Mother
- Aarcha as Anu (Venu's niece and Archana's student)
- Ramesh Pisharody as Satheeshan (Archana's cousin)
- Rajesh Madhavan as Broker
- Anju Joseph as Saranya (Archana's colleague)
- Renjith Shekar Nair Sumesh
- Sruthy Suresh as Sumesh's wife
- Sunil Sukhada as school principal
- Lukman Avaran as Prasad
- Azeez Nedumangad as Jignesh (Prasad's brother-in-law)
- Anjana Appukuttan as Praveena (Prasad's sister)
- Remya Suresh
- Vinod Vasudevan as Saranya's husband
- Vinod Thomas
- Archana Anilkumar
- Sneha Reji
- Thankam Mohan
- Joy Payyappilly

== Release ==
The film was released on 11 February 2022.

== Reception ==
The film met with mostly mixed reviews. The Times of India gave 3/5 and wrote "A movie that would have worked best as a short-film". Ottplay gave 3/5 and wrote "Aishwarya Lekshmi, interesting climax elevate this simple but sluggish tale". The News Minute gave 2.5/5 and wrote "This Aishwarya Lekshmi film starts smoothly, slips midway". The Indian Express wrote "Aishwarya Lekshmi shines in tiring watch".

== Soundtrack ==
The film's soundtrack was composed, programmed and arranged by Maathan and Rajat Prakash.

Archana 31 Not Out

Soundtrack album by Maathan and Rajat Prakash
- Released: January 16, 2022
- Genre: Feature film soundtrack
- Label: Saina Audios

Archana 31 Not Out (Original Motion Picture Soundtrack)
No.	Title	Lyrics	Music	Singer(s)	Length
1.	"Manasuno"	Maathan, James Paul	Maathan	Ramesh Pisharody; Backing vocals: Maathan, Finny Kurian	2:42
2.	"Arrival Of Archana"	Maathan, D. Santhosh	Maathan	Sayanora Philip	3:06
3.	"Kalyanamaane"	Dhanya Suresh Menon	Rajat Prakash	Rajat Prakash, Parvathy Jayadevan, Lal krishna, Swetha Sankar	3:54
4.	"Doorangal Thedi"	Joe Paul	Rajat Prakash	Tessa Chavara	3:56
5.	"Kandor kaanatte"	Dhanya Suresh Menon	Rajat Prakash	Rajat Prakash, Sheetal Nair	4:23
6.	"Manathe Chemparunthe"	Maathan	Maathan	Maathan	3:12
