= Hakim Shahjahan =

Indian actor

- Occupation: Actor
- Years active: 2013–present
- Spouse: Sana Althaf (m. 2024)

Hakim Shahjahan is an Indian actor who works predominantly in Malayalam films.

== Career ==
Hakim Shahjahan worked as an assistant director before making his debut as an actor through ABCD: American-Born Confused Desi (2013). He played one of the lead roles in Oru Sopetty Katha (2013) co-starring Shafique Rahman and played supporting roles in many films such as the Tamil film Kadaseela Biriyani (2021) and Archana 31 Not Out (2022). He went on to act in films like Pranaya Vilasam (2023), Bazooka (2025) and Mirage (2025).

He played one of the lead roles in Meesha (2025) with a critic noting that "Hakim portrays Anandhu convincingly, capturing the character's emotional highs and lows with precision".

== Filmography ==
Year	Title	Role	Notes
2013	ABCD: American-Born Confused Desi	College student	
2013	Oru Soppetty Katha	Tony Mathew	
2017	Rakshadhikari Baiju Oppu	Josemon	
2018	Naam	Manu Alexander	
2021	Nayattu	Hakkim	
2021	Kadaseela Biriyani	Johan Kariya aka Panni Kusu Roast	Tamil film
2021	Freedom @ Midnight	Das	Short film
2022	Archana 31 Not Out	Venu	
2022	Dear Friend	Sreenath	
2022	Visudha Mejo	Rahul	
2022	The Teacher	Sujith	
2023	Pranaya Vilasam	Vinod	Won–SIIMA Award for Best Supporting Actor
2024	Kadakan	Sulfi	
2024	Kadha Innuvare		
2024	Oru Kattil Oru Muri		
2024	Sorgavaasal	Tiger Mani	Tamil film
2025	Bazooka	Sunny Varghese / Mr. Mario / SD_47	
2025	Meesha	Anandhu	
2025	Mirage	Kiran / Amal	
2026	Pennu Case	CI Manoj	
2026	I, Nobody	Anas Rahman	
2026	Jailer 2	Sharva Kalpak	Tamil film
2026	Hail Mary †	TBA	
