= Shahi Kabir =

Indian director and screenwriter

- Born: 28 September 1978 (age 47); Alappuzha, Kerala, India
- Occupations: screenwriter; film director
- Years active: 2018-present
- Police career
- Department: Kerala Police
- Service years: 2005- present
- Rank: Civil Police Officer (CPO)

Shahi Kabir is an Indian screenwriter and film director who works in Malayalam films. He won the National Film Award for Best Screenplay and the Kerala State Film Award for Best Story for Nayattu. He has also won the Kerala State Award for Best Debut Director for Ela Veezha Poonchira.

== Career ==
Shahi Kabir was born in Alapuzha, Kerala, India, and currently lives in Kottayam. He previously served as a civil police officer with the Kerala Police.
He is known for his police procedural films, often portraying police work and investigations realistically, drawing on his experience as a police officer.
Shahi is known for writing the films Joseph (2018), Nayattu (2021) and Officer on Duty (2025). He made his directorial debut with the film Ela Veezha Poonchir (2022). His second directorial Ronth has been released on 13 June 2025.

== Filmography ==
Key
†	Denotes films that have not yet been released

=== As assistant director ===
- Thondimuthalum Driksakshiyum (2017)

=== As screenwriter ===
Year	Title	Director	Notes	Ref.
2018	Joseph	M. Padmakumar	Debut film	
2021	Nayattu	Martin Prakkat		
2025	Officer on Duty	Jithu Ashraf		
2026	Unmadham	Kiran Das		

=== As screenwriter and director ===
Year	Title	Notes	Ref.
2022	Ela Veezha Poonchira	Debut film	
2025	Ronth		
