= Madhuri Braganza =

Indian actress

- Occupation: Actor
- Years active: 2018–present

Madhuri Braganza is an Indian actress, who predominantly appears in Malayalam films. She also appeared in a Kannada film.

== Acting career ==
She debuted in the Malayalam movie Ente Mezhuthiri Athazhangal and in 2018 gained popularity through the movie Joseph. She acted in Ittymaani: Made in China along with Mohanlal.

She played a character role of a serious journalist in the Malayalam film Pattabhiraman. She is popular on social media for her active interaction with fans and critics alike. She acted in her debut Kannada film, Kushka, that was released in 2020. She also started her singing career in films in the movie Al Mallu. She has done eight Malayalam movies.

== Filmography ==
Key
†	Denotes film or TV productions that have not yet been released

Year	Title	Role	Language	Notes
2018	Ente Mezhuthiri Athazhangal	Paromitha Chhel	Malayalam	
2018	Joseph	Lisamma	Malayalam	
2019	Pattabhiraman	Maya	Malayalam	
2019	Ittymaani: Made in China	Young Theyyamma	Malayalam	
2020	Al Mallu		Malayalam	cameo appearance in song
2020	Kushka	Maimoon	Kannada	
2022	Pathonpatham Noottandu	Katha	Malayalam	
2022	Varaal		Malayalam	
