= Martin Prakkat =

Indian filmmaker

- Born: Changanassery, Kerala, India
- Occupations: Film director; screenwriter; film producer
- Years active: 2010–present

Martin Prakkat is an Indian film director, screenwriter, and producer who works primarily in Malayalam cinema. He is known for directing films such as Best Actor, ABCD: American-Born Confused Desi, Charlie, and Nayattu. His films have received several honours, including Kerala State Film Awards, with Charlie and Nayattu receiving critical recognition.

== Early life ==
Martin Prakkat was born to Kunjamma and P. J. Sebastian of Prakkat house in Changanassery, Kerala. He completed his collegiate education at St. Berchmans College in Changanacherry.

Before entering the film industry, Prakkat worked for approximately a decade as a celebrity photographer for Vanitha, a Malayalam-language magazine. His experience in photography preceded his transition to filmmaking.

== Career ==
Prakkat made his directorial debut with Best Actor (2010), a comedy-drama starring Mammootty as a schoolteacher who aspires to become an actor. The film was a commercial success and earned Prakkat the Kerala Film Critics Association Awards for Best Debut Director. He followed it with ABCD: American-Born Confused Desi (2013), starring Dulquer Salmaan and Aparna Gopinath. The film was commercially successful and further established his career as a director.

In 2015, Prakkat directed Charlie, a romantic drama starring Dulquer Salmaan and Parvathy Thiruvothu. The film received critical acclaim and won several honours, including multiple Kerala State Film Awards.

Charlie emerged as one of the major winners at the 2015 Kerala State Film Awards, receiving awards in eight categories. Prakkat won the award for Best Director, while Prakkat and Unni R. shared the award for Best Screenplay. Dulquer Salmaan received the Best Actor award for his performance in the film, and Parvathy Thiruvothu won the Best Actress award for her performances in Charlie and Ennu Ninte Moideen. Cinematographer Jomon T. John won the Best Cinematographer award for his work in Charlie, Ennu Ninte Moideen, and Nee-Na.

After a gap in his directorial career, he returned with Nayattu (2021), a socio-political thriller centred on three police officers on the run. The film received critical acclaim for its screenplay, performances, and portrayal of policing and political influence.

== Filmography ==
Year	Film	Credited as			Notes
Year	Film	Director	Screenplay	Producer	Notes
2010	Best Actor	Yes	Yes	No	Co-writer: Bipin Chandran
2013	ABCD: American-Born Confused Desi	Yes	Yes	No	Co-writer: Naveen Bhaskar, Sooraj-Neeraj
2015	Charlie	Yes	Yes	Yes	Co-producer: Shebin Becker, Joju George
2017	Udaharanam Sujatha	No	No	Yes	Co-producer: Joju George
2021	Nayattu	Yes	No	Yes	Co-Producer: Ranjith, P. M. Sasidharan
2022	Archana 31 Not Out	No	No	Yes	Co-producer: Renjith Nair, Siby Chavara
2023	Iratta	No	No	Yes	Co-producer: Joju George, Sijo Vadakkan
2025	Officer on Duty	No	No	Yes	Co-producer: Renjith Nair, Siby Chavara

=== Advertising work ===
The production house has produced commercials for brands in banking, FMCG, jewellery, education, and consumer services, often timed around culturally significant moments like Onam and festive seasons. He has worked on campaigns such as South Indian Bank festive films, Parle-G’s “Genius Onam” ad, Kavitha Gold & Diamonds’ gender-neutral communication featuring Fahadh Faasil, and spots for H2O Care.

=== As actor ===
- Achuvinte Amma
- Theevram - as himself, Cameo appearance

== Awards ==
- 2010 Kerala Film Critics Award for Best Debut Director for Best Actor
- 2015 Kerala State Film Award for Best Director for Charlie
- 2015 Kerala State Film Award for Best Screenplay for Charlie
- 2021 Kerala Film Critics Award for Best Director for Nayattu
- 2021 Best International Feature Film Award at the Swedish Film Festival for Nayattu
- 2021 National award for best screenplay for Nayattu
- 2022 Shortlisted for India's submission for Best International Feature Film at the Academy Awards for Nayattu
- 2022 Official Selection at Dhaka International Film Festival for Nayattu
- 2024 Kerala State Film Award for Second Best Film for Iratta
