= Ela Veezha Poonchira =

- Directed by: Shahi Kabir
- Written by: Nidhish G Shaji Maarad
- Produced by: Vishnu Venu
- Starring: Soubin Shahir; Sudhi Koppa; Jude Anthany Joseph
- Cinematography: Manesh Madhavan
- Edited by: Kiran Das
- Music by: Anil Johnson
- Production company: Kadhaas Untold
- Release date: 15 July 2022
- Running time: 104 minutes
- Country: India
- Language: Malayalam

Ela Veezha Poonchira (transl. Pond where leaves don't fall) is an Indian Malayalam-language crime thriller film directed by Shahi Kabir. It stars Soubin Shahir, Sudhi Koppa, and Jude Anthany Joseph. The movie was produced by Vishnu Venu under his banner Kadhaas Untold. The film was released on 15 July 2022. Ela Veezha Poonchira is the first ever Malayalam film to be released in Dolby Vision 4K HDR.

== Plot ==
Madhu, a police officer stationed at a remote hilltop outpost known for frequent lightning strikes, returns to duty after witnessing a boy die in a lightning accident. He is soon joined by Sudhi, an inquisitive and carefree officer whose curiosity leads him to uncover a partially buried human hand near the station. When Sudhi attempts to alert the authorities, Madhu prevents him and later reveals that the hand belongs to his wife, Amrutha.

Madhu explains that his marriage had deteriorated due to his erectile dysfunction and Amrutha's affair with another man. After discovering that Amrutha had died by suicide while pregnant and consumed by guilt, Madhu dismembered her body to conceal her death, insisting that he did not kill her. He further reveals that Sudhi was Amrutha's lover, and implies that the biryani he served Sudhi contained the fetus she had been carrying.

Police records confirm Sudhi's relationship with Amrutha and show that he had rejected her after learning of the pregnancy. Madhu ties Sudhi to a metal fence, where he is struck and killed by lightning. Although a senior police officer suspects Madhu's involvement, he ultimately classifies Sudhi's death as a lightning accident, effectively closing the case.

== Cast ==
- Soubin Shahir as Police constable Madhu P. M.
- Sudhi Koppa as Police constable Sudheer "Sudhi"
- Jude Anthany Joseph as Venkayam
- Jithu Ashraf as Inspector SHO Jinto P. K.
- Vincent Vadakkan as SP Manoj C. Madathil
- Girish Mohan as Forensic expert
- Jineesh Chandran as The lover
- Rajesh Kumar as CPO Driver Rajesh Kumar

== Production ==
The film was produced by Vishnu Venu under the banner Kadhaas Untold. The film was scripted by police officers Nidhish G. and Shaji Maarad. Manesh Madhavan handled the cinematography. While Anil Johnson composed music for the film, Ajayan Adat designed the sounds. Kiran Das was the editor. 4K HDR colour grading was contributed by colourist Robert Lang.

=== Casting ===
Soubin Shahir arrives in the main role as a policeman who is a security guard in the high range of Ilaveezhapoonchira and the story of the film is a murder and its investigation. Sudhi Koppa and Jude Anthony Joseph are the other important characters in the film.

=== Filming ===
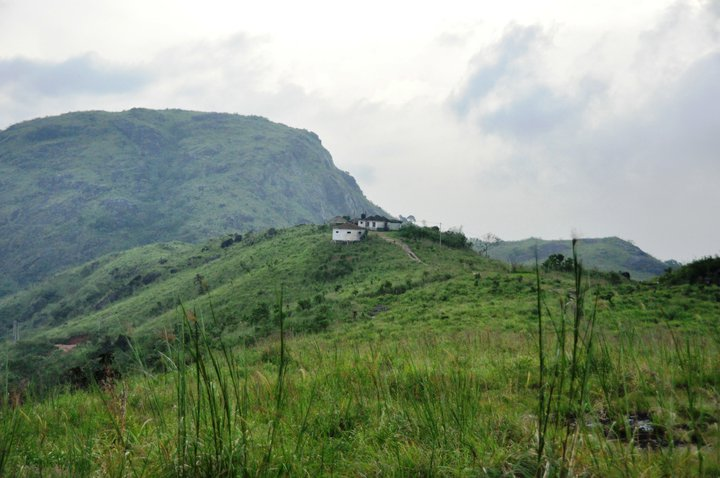
Location: Ilaveezha Poonchira

The film is set in the secluded region of Ilaveezhapoonchira located at an altitude of over 3000 feet above sea level. The place is located in Melukavu village in Kottayam district. Although the place is a tourist attraction, the chances of thunderstorms are very high.

== Release ==
The film was announced on 28 September 2021 through Kadhaas Untold's official Facebook page. The trailer of the film was released in YouTube on 26 June 2022. The film was released on 15 July 2022.

== Accolades ==
Year	Award	Category	Winner	Ref
2023	Kerala State Film Awards	Best Debutant Director	Shahi Kabir	
2023	Kerala State Film Awards	Best Cinematography	Manesh Madhavan	
2023	Kerala State Film Awards	Best Sound Design	Ajayan Adat	
2023	Kerala State Film Awards	Best Processing Lab / Colourist	Robert Lang CSI	

== See also ==
- Ilaveezha Poonchira (tourist place)
