= Ilaveezha Poonchira =

Village in Kottayam District, Kerala, India

Coordinates: 9.9000°N 76.7170°E

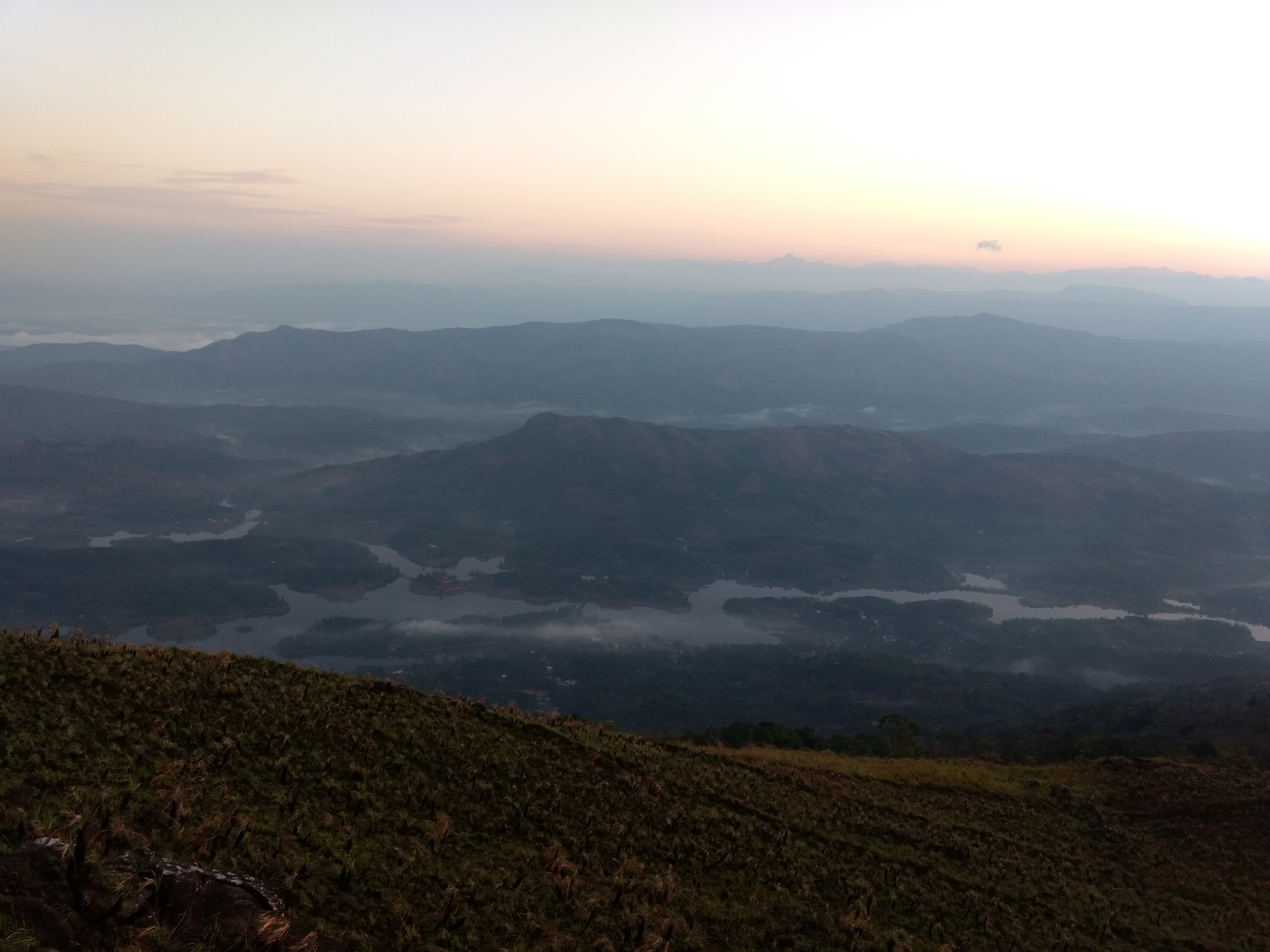
Ilaveezha Poonichira top view

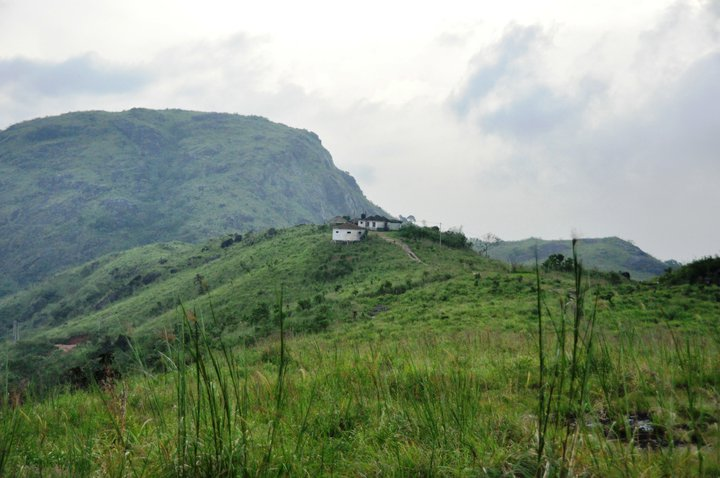
Ilaveezha Poonchira

Ilaveezhapoonchira is a tourist destination located in Melukavu village in Kottayam district near Kanjar. Ilaveezha Poonchira is surrounded by three enchanting hillocks - Mankunnu, Kodayathoormala and Thonippara. This makes the place ideal for trekking (Elevation 962 m (3155 ft)).

== Etymology ==
"Ila-veezhaa-poonchira", means 'the pond of flowers where the leaves do not fall'. During the monsoons, the valley between a complex of mountains fills up to form a large pond.

== Tourism ==
Ilaveezhapoonchira is an established destination for both domestic as well as foreign tourists. It is a hill station in bordering Idukki Kottayam district, Kerala, southern India. It is 3,200 feet above sea level and surrounded by lush green tea plantations and valleys.

== Legends related to Ilaveezha poonchira ==
According to local Legends, the Pandava had a sojourn here during their life incognito. Their wife, Draupadi, came to bathe at a lake, which was present at that time. Some devas, bewitched by her beauty, tried to satisfy their voyeuristic itch. King of devas, Lord Indra, learned of the situation, and built screens or hills heaping flowers and prevented them from indulging in such a practice. And the pond thus became a dam isolated by floral hills. Since there were no trees around the bund, it was always free of leaves and so it was called Ila-veezha-poonchira. Some say that the name comes from the fact that it is always windy at the place and hence the leaves are carried away.

Poonjira's Legends is also related to story of Agastya and his hermitage, he lived here and some of the native people believes that he still lives here, his hermitage is hidden in somewhere here. Another attraction is the ancient Krishna temple, that was believed to be founded by Panjali herself. It is believed that Panjali's akshayapatra is hidden here and it is protected by agastya. The Legend is also associate with Ramayana his vanavasa popularly believes that he lived here with Lakshmana for few months

== Location ==
Ilavvezha Poonchira is located 20 km from Thodupuzha and is located 55 km from Kottayam. From Ilaveezha Poonchira, it is possible to see large parts of Idukki, Kottayam, Ernakulam, Alappuzha, Pathanamthitta and Thrissur districts. Sunrise and sunset can both be observed here.
