= Iratta =

2023 Indian film by Rohit M. G. Krishnan

- Film poster
- Directed by: Rohit M. G. Krishnan
- Written by: Rohit M. G. Krishnan
- Produced by: Joju George; Martin Prakkat; Sijo Vadakkan
- Starring: Joju George; Anjali; Arya Salim; Srikant Murali
- Cinematography: Vijay
- Edited by: Manu Antony
- Music by: Jakes Bejoy
- Production companies: Appu Pathu Pappu Production House; Martin Prakkat Films
- Release date: 3 February 2023
- Running time: 111 minutes
- Country: India
- Language: Malayalam

Iratta (transl. Twin) is a 2023 Indian Malayalam-language crime thriller film written and directed by Rohit M. G. Krishnan, starring Joju George in dual roles, Anjali, Arya Salim and Srikant Murali. The film revolves around the death of a policeman during duty hours at Vagamon police station and the investigation that follows by his estranged twin brother.

== Plot ==
The film begins with the murder of 52-year-old ASI Vinod Kumar, the twin brother of DYSP Pramod. There are three suspects in the murder: ASI John, CPO Bineesh, and SCPO Sandeep. All three worked with Vinod at the Vagamon police station and held ill-will towards Vinod, due to different incidents. It is revealed through the incidents, narrated by the trio individually, that Vinod was a drunkard and womanizer . Bineesh narrates how he once caught Vinod coming out of a lodge room after raping a 17-year-old girl in an inebriated state.

Pramod is a recovered alcoholic, who is now sober but is separated from his wife, Sreeja, and daughter. Unable to withstand his drunkard behaviour, Sreeja had left for Mumbai with their newborn daughter. Pramod recalls his and Vinod's childhood. The two brothers grew up in the same household with an abusive and absent father, who was a police constable. One day, their parents had a violent fight over their father's infidelity. This causes their parents' separation. Pramod stays with their mother, while Vinod is forcibly taken away by their father. This fuels Vinod's resentment towards Pramod and their mother, as he feels betrayed and left alone to face their father's abuse. One day, a few people hack their father to death, after he tried to sleep with an underaged girl and molest her. Years later, both the twins become police officers, but take different paths. Pramod starts as a sub-Inspector and eventually becomes a respected and honest Deputy Superintendent of Police (DYSP), while Vinod started as a constable and becomes a violent and street-smart Assistant Sub-Inspector (ASI).

At present, DYSP Satheesh, who has close ties with Vinod, leads the investigation. He also doubts Pramod, as he is aware of the duo's past and hatred towards each other. This is further fueled by the statement of Vinod's lover, Malini, who recently came into his life and changed him for the better. Hence, Pramod is kept away from the investigation initially, but he requests to take over the case. He quickly proceeds with the investigation, and it turns out that all the three suspects have legitimate alibis. He then finds camera footage from a media personnel recording, in which he sees two children playing cricket with their dog in the nearby field. Upon contacting them, it is revealed that Vinod actually committed suicide by shooting 3 times on his chest and one of them witnessed it while picking up their cricket ball.

Puzzled and shocked by the new discovery, Pramod starts to look into the motive for Vinod's suicide, especially since it seemed as though he was very happy after Malini had come into his life. At this point, a few constables receive the footage of the music reality show that Vinod was watching just before he committed suicide. Pramod sees Sreeja in the audience and realises that his grown-up daughter Swetha is one of the participants. Pramod suspects the worst and confirms the identity of the minor girl raped by Vinod in the lodge with the reality show and realises that the girl was Swetha. Pramod infers that Vinod realised that he raped his own niece and unable to bear the guilt, he committed suicide.

The film ends with Sreeja trying to reconnect with Pramod, after hearing of Vinod's death. However, he strictly instructs her not to tell Swetha about him or ever show her his face, as she has unknowingly "seen" her father's face on that unfortunate night at the lodge. Pramod, unknowingly, has to now atone for the sins of both Vinod, their father and also his mistakes done to Sreeja.

== Cast ==
- Joju George in a dual role as:
  - SI/DYSP Pramod Kumar
    - Sabarinath Shyam as Young Pramod
  - Head Constable/ASI Vinod Kumar
    - Kashinath Shyam as Young Vinod
- Anjali as Malini, Vinod's partner
- Arya Salim as SP Savitha Sathyan IPS
- Srikant Murali as DYSP Satheesh Chandran
- Abhiram Radhakrishnan as CPO Bineesh
- Sabumon Abdusamad as SCPO Sandeep
- Manoj K. U. as ASI John
- Srindaa as Minister Geetha Rajendran
- Meenakshi Dinesh as Swetha
- Sreeja Ajith as Sreeja Ram, Pramod's wife
- Pooja Mohanraj as SCPO Amrutha
- Sruthy Suresh as SCPO Salini
- Shebin Benson as Bobby
- James Eliya as Dr. James
- Sarath Sabha as Sabu
- Sruthy Jayan as Saradha
- Kichu Tellus as Chandran Pillai
- Abhilash Vijay as CPO Abhilash
- Dhanesh Anand as Chanel Reporter
- Deepu G Panicker as SI Arun Nath
- Samson Mathew Valiyaparambil as DGP
- Jithu Asharef as Samson Wilfred

== Release and reception ==
The film released in theatres in Kerala on 3 February 2023. It had its theatrical release outside Kerala on 17 February 2023, and had its digital premiere on Netflix on 3 March 2023.

The film received positive reviews. S. R. Praveen of The Hindu opined that "Joju George's double act and a gut-wrenching climax" redeems the otherwise "average police procedural." A reviewer from Malayala Manorama noted that the film is an "emotional, suspense-filled thriller," and "yet another excellent cinema in Malayalam." Rating the film 4/5, a reviewer from The Times of India wrote, "Iratta is a movie that draws you in, steals your breath and leaves you with pain." Telangana Today praised Joju George's ability to bring out the different exposure and exhibition of the two characters. Saketh Reddy Eleti of ABP Desam rates this Movie 3.5 out of 5 stars and wrote, "Iratta is an Excellent thriller with a Disturbing Twist." He praised Joju George's performance as Pramod and Vinod.
