= Nayattu (2021 film) =

2021 film directed by Martin Prakkat

- Theatrical release poster
- Directed by: Martin Prakkat
- Written by: Shahi Kabir
- Produced by: Ranjith; P. M. Sasidharan
- Starring: Kunchako Boban; Joju George; Nimisha Sajayan
- Cinematography: Shyju Khalid
- Edited by: Mahesh Narayanan; Rajesh Rajenndrran
- Music by: Vishnu Vijay
- Production companies: Gold Coin Motion Picture Company; Martin Prakkat Films
- Distributed by: Magic Frames
- Release date: 8 April 2021 (India)
- Running time: 122 minutes
- Country: India
- Language: Malayalam

Nayattu (transl. Hunt) is a 2021 Indian Malayalam-language drama thriller film directed by Martin Prakkat and written by Shahi Kabir. It was produced by Ranjith and P. M. Sasidharan through Gold Coin Motion Picture Company in association with Martin Prakkat Films. The film stars Kunchako Boban, Joju George, and Nimisha Sajayan. Vishnu Vijay composed the original songs and background score.

The film was released on 8 April 2021 to widespread critical acclaim for its direction and the cast's performances. It was one among the 14 films shortlisted for India's submission for the Best International Feature Film at the 94th Academy Awards, but lost in final selection. The film was remade in Telugu as Kota Bommali PS (2023). A spiritual successor of the film titled Ronth was released in 2025.

== Plot ==
Praveen Michael rejoins the police force in a new station as a CPO. (Note: CPO stands for Civil Police Officer, a designation used for constable in the Kerala Police.) A local political goon named Biju, who is related to police officer CPO Sunitha, is summoned for being a constant troublemaker. Praveen and his senior officer ASI Maniyan get into a scuffle with the goon and lock him up in a cell, but he is later released without charge due to the political influence of his Dalit party. After a wedding party, Maniyan and Praveen are drunk, joined by Sunitha who accepts a lift. With Maniyan's nephew Rahul as the driver, they get into a collision with a motorbike. They move to assist after realizing that the bike rider Jayan is a friend of Biju.

Rahul flees from the scene immediately, after which the trio gets spotted by civilians. They attempt to rescue Jayan, who is announced dead on arrival, sending Biju's mob into a rage and forcing the trio to flee to their station. At the station, Maniyan realizes that they will be accused of murder and arrested soon, resulting in the trio going on the run. With political pressure mounting on the police to frame them, they retreat to Munnar to seek asylum with an old acquaintance of Maniyan. The CM gets involved in the matter due to an impending election where the support of the Dalit organization is crucial for victory. The investigation is handed over to the State Crime Branch. A squad of senior police officers, led by SP Anuradha, is sent in pursuit of the fugitives.

Anuradha and her squad manage to locate the runaways but cannot launch an assault due to the strategic location of their hiding place. In the city, the police decides to stage a drama with the allowance of the CM. They announce that all three police officers are arrested and parade dummies with faces covered to the media. When the squad finally makes the move, Praveen and Sunitha run, only to find Maniyan hanging dead in a building with a suicide video note in his mobile phone as a dying declaration. Due to the previous dummy arrest, the squad is in trouble. The CM threatens to place the blame on the police department, ordering them to clean up the mess.

Praveen tries to escape to safeguard the suicide video but is captured and is arrested along with Sunitha and brought to the police club along with Maniyan's body. The police officers stage Maniyan's suicide in police custody and compel the other two to give corroborating statements, which makes Maniyan responsible for the death of the Dalit youth and thus making them free of the crime. Praveen and Sunitha both refuse, and they are given time to change their mind till they reach the court. They are later placed in custody and transported to court in a police van as the voting for the by-elections takes place. The police try to destroy the video of Maniyan, which is the dying declaration. Later, the other police officers present the same in the court. The court orders for a CBI probe in the proceedings of the case for further enquiry.

== Cast ==
- Kunchako Boban as CPO Praveen Michael
- Joju George as ASI Maniyan
- Nimisha Sajayan as WCPO Sunitha
- Jaffar Idukki as Chief Minister Jayaprakash
- Jithu Asharef as SHO
- Yama Gilgamesh as Crime Branch SP Anuradha IPS
- Anil Nedumangad as Crime Branch DYSP Santhosh
- Vinod Sagar as Moorthi
- Krishna Prasad
- Hakim Shahjahan as Hakkim
- Dineesh P. as Biju
- Jineesh Chandran as Rahul
- Abhilash Vijay as Crime Branch Officer Kishore
- Samson Matthew Valiyaparambil as Chief Secretary
- Seju K. Eapen as IG, Crime Branch
- Ajit Koshy as DGP
- Ghanshyam Nair as ADGP
- Rajendran as Local SP
- Manohari Joy as Praveen's mother
- Sminu Sijo as Maniyan's wife
- Arafaath Ansaari as Praveen's friend
- Ajayan Adat as Doctor

== Production ==
Principal photography of the film began before the COVID-19 pandemic in India and stopped during lockdown period. The filming resumed by the end of September and was completed in October 2020.

== Music ==
The music was composed by Vishnu Vijay.

Nayattu

Soundtrack album by Vishnu Vijay
- Released: 19 April 2021
- Recorded: 2020–2021
- Genre: Feature film soundtrack
- Length: 10:25
- Language: Malayalam
- Label: 123 Musix
- Producer: Vishnu Vijay

Vishnu Vijay chronology
Ambili (2019)	Nayattu (2021)	Bheemante Vazhi (2021)
External audio
- Audio Jukebox on YouTube

Nayattu
No.	Title	Lyrics	Artist(s)	Length
1.	"Appalaale"	Anwar Ali	Madhuvanthi Narayan	3:22
2.	"Marukara Thedum (Travel Song)"	Vinayak Sasikumar	Antony Dasan	4:02
3.	"Narabali"	Vedan	Vedan	3:01
Total length:				10:25

== Release ==
The movie was released on 8 April 2021.

== Accolades ==
Year	Award/Festival	Category	Recipient	Notes
2021	Diorama International Film Festival	Second Best Indian Feature Film		
2021	Diorama International Film Festival	Best Actor	Joju George	
2021	Kerala State Film Awards	Best Actor	Joju George	
2021	Kerala State Film Awards	Best Story	Shahi Kabir	
2021	Kerala State Film Awards	Best Editor	Mahesh Narayanan and Rajesh Rajendran	

== Reception ==
On the review aggregator website Rotten Tomatoes, 100% of 6 critics' reviews are positive, with an average rating of 7.5/10.

Baradwaj Rangan of Film Companion wrote, "Nayattu is an object lesson on how to take a thriller template and subvert it, leaving the audience thinking that they've watched a hard-hitting social drama". S. R. Praveen of The Hindu wrote, "‘Nayattu’ is a convincing portrayal of the mercilessness of a faceless system, where the hunters could become hunted before they even realise it." Anna MM Vetticad of Firstpost gave 4/5 stars and said, "It did not seem possible that Malayalam cinema could throw up a gem to rival The Great Indian Kitchen this year, but it already has – Nayattu is it." Manoj Kumar R of The Indian Express gave 3.5/5 stars and wrote, "This film is as much a thriller as it is the indictment of the failure of the public to be reasonable". Anna Mathews of The Times of India gave 3.5/5 stars and wrote, "Nayattu is well worth a watch for the whole family, with its mix of police story, personal drama and message on our politics".
