= Joseph (2018 film) =

2018 Indian crime thriller film

- Theatrical release poster
- Directed by: M. Padmakumar
- Written by: Shahi Kabir
- Produced by: Joju George
- Starring: Joju George; Dileesh Pothan; Athmiya Rajan; Malavika Menon; Madhuri Braganza
- Cinematography: Manesh Madhavan
- Edited by: Kiran Das
- Music by: Songs: Ranjin Raj; Score: Anil Johnson
- Production company: Appu Pathu Pappu Production
- Distributed by: Showbiz Studios
- Release date: 16 November 2018
- Running time: 138 minutes
- Country: India
- Language: Malayalam

Joseph is a 2018 Indian Malayalam-language crime thriller film directed by M. Padmakumar and written by Shahi Kabir. It stars Joju George, Dileesh Pothan, Irshad, Athmiya Rajan, Johny Antony, Sudhi Koppa, Malavika Menon, and Madhuri Braganza.

The story, an investigation thriller, develops through the life of four retired policemen. Some scenes in movie (the double crime scene in beginning) is based on real life experience from the writer, Shahi Kabir. Joju won the Kerala State Film Award for Best Character Actor and also won Special Mention in the National Awards. The film was remade in Kollywood as Visithiran (2022), in Tollywood as Sekhar (2022) and in Sandalwood as Ravi Bopanna (2022). A Bollywood remake is also being made with Sunny Deol titled Suryaa: Ant Se Aarambh Tak.

== Plot ==
Joseph, a retired detective CPO with sharp investigating skills, lives a lonely life, and is separated from his wife Stella, who is now married to another person named Peter. One day, Joseph is called by SP Venugopal to investigate a crime scene involving the murder of an old couple. He reaches the crime scene and begins his investigation. Upon questioning the people present at the crime scene, it is revealed that a person named Manu was the first to witness the incident when he came to supply milk to their house and was also the one who informed the police.

After questioning the members present at the crime scene, Joseph deduces that Manu is the culprit and arrests him using his skills and experience . Few days later, Joseph learns that Stella, his ex-wife met with an accident and rushes to the hospital to enquire about her condition. His friends find out that Joseph still has love for Stella and then enquires about the reason for separation. Joseph reveals that few years after he married Stella, he went to investigate a crime scene, while examining the corpse, he was shocked to find out that the corpse was of his ex-girlfriend Lisamma, and her death really haunted him to the extent that he was afraid to even touch Stella and did not reveal this fact to Stella, which rendered him alcoholic and caused the separation. But later, he reveals everything to Stella, which she accepts but says it's too late for their relationship. Later, Stella is declared brain dead and is requested for the donation of her organs by the doctor which is signed by Peter, her current husband. Joseph recalls a similar incident when his daughter died a year earlier, due to an accident, and was asked consent for organ donation which him and Stella signed together.

Joseph and his friends reach the spot where Stella met with the accident, and receives the car number from the tea shop owner, who also describe the incident as seen by him. Joseph guesses that the car number would be a fake, which proved to be true. Joseph finds out that when Stella fell, her forearm would have received maximum injury and would be less chances for a head injury to happen. Joseph tracks all the second hand used cars of the car model recognized by the eyewitness and traces its ID. He also made sure that an eyewitness is present in order to make the case a-hit-and-run rather than a murder. Joseph tells his friends that a crime happens within 48 hours after a new SIM card is taken by the lady who traveled in the car.

Meanwhile, Joseph visits a girl named Renuka to whom his daughter's heart was transplanted and finds her still sick. Joseph tells the girl's mother to meet his cardiologist friend for checking up the girl's persisting sickness. After some days Joseph is informed that Renuka has died. Joseph tracks the mobile of the people who took Stella to the hospital and gathers some information about a new second hand car that got sold in the hospital locality and arranges his friends to follow it, but on the day when the black used car comes out, Joseph's friends' car gets punctured and they were unable to follow that car. His friends try to call Joseph but he doesn't pick up the phone. Joseph travels on his bike, mimicking the accident happened to Stella, is hit down and picked up by the same couple in the black car.

At the court, the advocate tells that Joseph has provided strong evidence of the crime conducted in the name of organ transplantation for ₹1 crore from each hospital for organ transplant in the place of ₹10 lakhs profit made if the patient is to be treated to become well. It is revealed that Joseph's bike fitted with a camera at its rear which records the event. The killers' jeep comes and hits him down and is being picked up by a couple in a black used car. Inside the car, a camera which was earlier fitted by Joseph's friend shows the female hitting Joseph's head with a hammer rendering him brain damaged and finally gets operated in the operation theater as an organ donor.

It is revealed that Joseph was told by his cardiologist friend that the aforementioned transplantation had no effect for the girl as if it was not done. Joseph tracked some big hospital records which show transplantation was done for foreigners on the same day that his daughter's organ was donated and Stella's organs were also donated to a foreigner. Joseph found a high priority list for AB negative blood group which was matching his own blood group, to come under the focus of the hospital in killing him. Joseph conducted a trial suicide previously by cutting his vein and getting admitted in the hospital for listing himself as a possible donor of the rare group. Joseph was spied on by the hospital's arranged killers to watch his daily activities.

Finally, Joseph punctures his friend's car by himself so that the crime gets conducted in the usual manner, gets recorded and full evidence should be recorded intact. Later, Joseph's diligence and sacrifice for exposing the crime conducted by the hospital for organ transplantation gets acknowledged. Peter receives the medal in the name of Joseph and later pays tribute to him along with other officers at his grave located just next to Stella and Dayana's grave.

== Cast ==
- Joju George as retired CPO Joseph Parekkatil
- Athmiya Rajan as Stella Joseph/Stella Peter, Joseph's ex-wife
- Malavika Menon as Dayana Joseph, Joseph's and Stella's daughter
- Madhuri Braganza as Lisamma, Joseph's ex-love interest
- Dileesh Pothan as Peter, Stella's new husband
- Irshad as T.Sidique, Joseph's friend
- Sudhi Koppa as Sudhi, Joseph's friend
- James Eliya as Joseph's friend
- Kijan as Joseph's friend
- Nedumudi Venu as Adv. Srinivasan
- Johny Antony as Church Priest
- Jaffar Idukki as Church Priest
- Bitto Davis as Tea Shop Owner
- Rajesh Sharma as Viswanathan
- Anil Murali as SP Venugopal IPS
- Idavela Babu as Car Owner
- Prem Prakash as Cardiologist
- Sonia M S as Renuka (The Girl who receives Dayana's heart)

== Music ==
The songs were composed by Ranjin Raj and Bhagyaraj (Pandu Paadavarambathiloode), while the film score was composed by Anil Johnson

No.	Title	Lyrics	Singer(s)	Length
1.	"Poomuthole (Version II)"	Ajeesh Dasan	Niranj Suresh	5:20
2.	"Poomuthole (Version I)"	Ajeesh Dasan	Vijay Yesudas	5:20
3.	"Karineela Kannulla"	B.K.Harinarayanan	Karthik, Akhila Anand	4:19
4.	"Pandu Paadavarambathiloode"	Bhagyaraj	Joju George & Benedict Shine	4:11
5.	"Uyirin Naadhane"	B.K.Harinarayanan	Vijay Yesudas & Merin Gregory	4:48
6.	"Kannethaa Dooram"	B.K.Harinarayanan	Vijay Yesudas	5:07

== Release ==
The film was released on 16 November 2018.

=== Box office ===
Joseph was commercial success and ran for 125 days in theatres.

== Controversy ==
The film was criticised by Indian Medical Association for depicting a plot which included murder of potential donors for the sake of organ transplantation scam, on the backdrop of reducing numbers of organ transplantation in Kerala during recent years mainly due to stricter laws.

In an interview to The Hindu, the writer Shahi Kabir responded that he did not intend to create a scare about Mrithasanjeevani (Kerala Network for Organ Sharing), a project of the state government, but an attempt to prevent a crime. He narrowed on the topic after several discussions about organ donation in public platforms including social media.

== Awards ==
Awards	Category	Recipient
National Film Awards	Special Mention	Joju George
Kerala State Film Awards	Best Character Actor	Joju George
Kerala State Film Awards	Best Playback Singer (Male)	Vijay Yesudas
Kerala State Film Awards	Best Lyricist	B. K. Harinarayanan
Movie Street Film Awards	Best Actor	Joju George
Movie Street Film Awards	Best Music Direction	Ranjin Raj
Movie Street Film Awards	Best Background Score	Anil Johnson
Filmfare Awards South	Best Actor	Joju George
Filmfare Awards South	Best Playback Singer - Male	Vijay Yesudas
South Indian International Movie Awards	SIIMA Award for Best Male Playback Singer	Vijay Yesudas

== Critical reception ==
In a review for The Hindu, S. R. Praveen called Joseph "a rewarding character study". Anna M. M. Vetticad, of FirstPost, found Joju George "dominate(d) an atmospheric, poignant, but over-stretched cop saga."

Anjana George, in The Times of India praised the film and rated it 4 stars out of 5.

== Other information ==
The film Joseph explicitly discusses the illegal organ trade. Anshul Sinha's 2015 docufiction Gateway to Heaven also explores the dark side of human organ sale through the black market
