= Assistant sub-inspector of police =

Police officer rank in India, Pakistan and Nepal

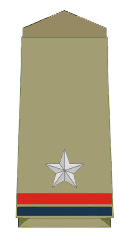
Insignia of an Indian Police officer holding the rank of Assistant Sub-Inspector

In the police forces of India, Nepal, and Pakistan an assistant sub-inspector (ASI) is a non-gazetted police officer ranking above a head constable and below a sub-inspector. The rank insignia of an Assistant Sub-Inspector of Police (ASIP) is one star, with a red and blue striped ribbon at the outer edge of the shoulder straps. An assistant sub-inspector can be an investigating officer, and is often the officer in charge of Police Outposts, or "phari", or Investigation Centres.

In the State Armed Police Forces and Central Armed Police Forces, an assistant sub-inspector will serve as platoon second-in-command to a Sub-inspector. In the Border Security Force, an assistant sub-inspector will be in charge of a border patrol platoon.
