= Joju George =

Indian actor and film producer

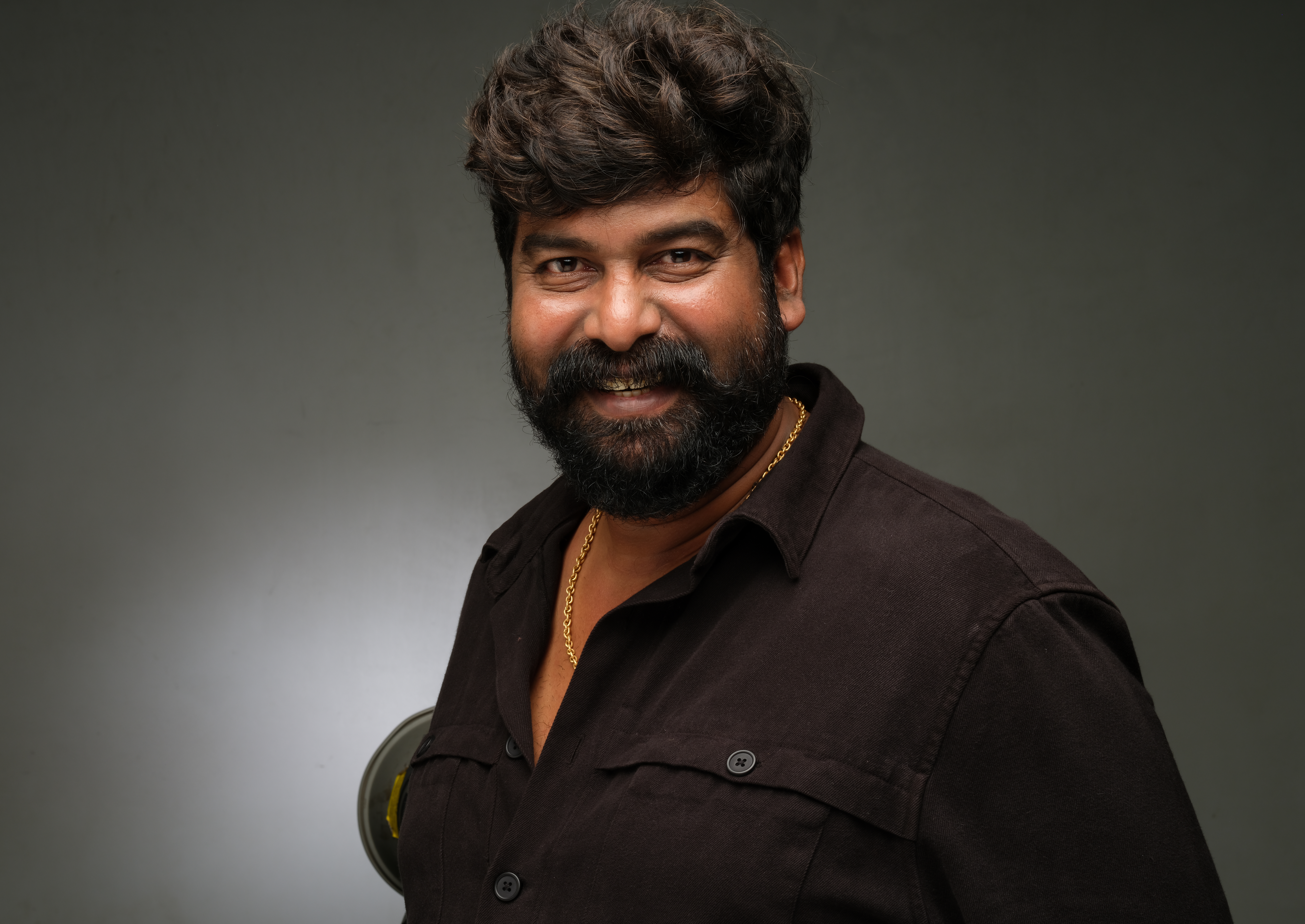
- Born: Joseph George; 22 October 1978 (age 48); Mala, Kerala, India
- Education: Christ College, Irinjalakuda
- Occupations: Actor; producer; writer; director; singer
- Years active: 1995–present
- Works: Full list
- Spouse: Abba
- Children: 3
- Awards: National Film Award (1); Kerala State Film Awards (4)

Joseph "Joju" George (born 22 October 1978) is an Indian actor, playback singer, director, writer and producer who primarily works in Malayalam cinema along with Tamil, and Telugu cinemas.

In 2015, he won the Kerala State Film Award – Special Mention for his supporting roles in Oru Second Class Yathra and Lukka Chuppi. His film Joseph got special mention at 66th National Film Awards.

In 2015, he stepped into film production and produced films such as Charlie and Udaharanam Sujatha before successfully launching his own production house Appu Pathu Pappu Production, which has produced several of his films. He is a recipient of more than 20 awards, awarded for either his acting or production.

== Early life ==
Joju was born as Joseph George in Mala, Thrissur district, Kerala to Rosy and George of the Parecattil house. He studied at the Government High School in Kuzhur and at Christ College, Irinjalakuda, before entering the film industry as a junior artist in 1995 and subsequently working as an assistant director from 1997.

== Film career ==
Joju debuted as an actor in the 1995 film Mazhavilkoodaram as a junior artist. This was followed by several minor roles in the late 1990s and 2000s. In the 2010s, he gradually shifted to playing supporting roles. In 2013 Joju got a major comic role as a Police commissioner in Hotel California directed by Aji John, gathered attention of both industry insiders and audience alike which was his first ever full-length character role in a feature film. In 2015, he won his first Kerala State Film Award (Special Mention) for his supporting roles in the films Oru Second Class Yathra, Yathra Chodikkathe and Lukka Chuppi. His breakthrough came when he played the leading role in the 2018 film Joseph, directed by M. Padmakumar, in which he played a retired police officer investigating a personal case while fighting demons of his own. The film received a special mention in the National Film Awards that year and Joju received his second Kerala State Film Award, this time for Best Character Actor for Joseph and the film Chola. In 2021, he was awarded at the 3rd Diorama International Film Festival under the category of Best Actor for his performance in Nayattu. He was the first Malayali to win the award. Since then, he has played several leading roles in films such Porinju Mariam Jose, Halal Love Story, Jagame Thanthiram, Pada, and Aviyal. He received praise for his performances in the films Nayattu, Madhuram and Freedom Fight for which he won the award for Best Actor that year at the Kerala State Film Awards. In the same year, he debuted in Tamil cinema alongside Dhanush in the film Jagame Thandhiram, directed by Karthik Subbaraj, which was released on Netflix. His second Tamil release was the Anthology series Putham Pudhu Kaalai Vidiyaadhaa, an Amazon Original. In 2025, he starred in Subbaraj's Retro alongside Suriya and Pooja Hegde.

In addition to acting, he has produced 6 films under his production house including Charlie (2015), Joseph (2018) (in which he also played the lead role in), Chola (2019), Porinju Mariam Jose (2019) and Madhuram (2021). He has been credited as a playback singer, having sung in his own film Joseph.

== Personal life ==
Joju married Abba in 2008, and they have three children: Ian, Sarah, and Ivan.

== Awards and nominations ==
Awards and nominations
Award	Wins	Nominations
Filmfare Awards	3	0
National Film Awards	1	0

Totals (Note: Certain award groups do not simply award one winner. They acknowledge several different recipients, have runners-up, and have third place. Since this is a specific recognition and is different from losing an award, runner-up mentions are considered wins in this award tally. For simplification and to avoid errors, each award in this list has been presumed to have had a prior nomination.)
- Wins: 27
- Nominations: 4

Award	Year	Category	Film	Result
National Film Awards	2019	Special Mention (feature film)	Joseph	Won
Kerala State Film Awards	2023	Second Best Feature Film	Iratta	Won
Kerala State Film Awards	2021	Best Actor	Freedom Fight, Naayattu, Madhuram,Thuramukham	Won
Kerala State Film Awards	2015	Special Mention	Oru Second Class Yathra; Lukka Chuppi	Won
Kerala State Film Awards	2018	Best Character Actor	Chola; Joseph	Won
Kerala Film Critics Award	2015	Most Popular Film	Charlie	Won
Kerala Film Critics Award	2018	Second Best Actor	Joseph	Won
Kerala Film Critics Award	2018	Second Best Film	Joseph	Won
Filmfare Awards South	2018	Best Actor (Malayalam)	Joseph	Won
Filmfare Awards South	2024	Best Film – Malayalam	Iratta	Nominated
Filmfare Awards South	2024	Best Actor – Malayalam	Iratta	Nominated
Filmfare Awards South	2024	Critics Best Actor – Malayalam	Iratta	Won
Filmfare Awards South	2021	Best Supporting Actor – Malayalam	Nayattu	Won
Filmfare Awards South	2026	Best Debut Director	Pani	Won
South Indian International Movie Awards	2016	Best Actor in a Comedy Role (Malayalam)	Action Hero Biju	Won
South Indian International Movie Awards	2017	Best Actor in a Supporting Role (Malayalam)	Ramante Edanthottam	Nominated
South Indian International Movie Awards	2018	Best Actor – Malayalam	Joseph	Nominated
South Indian International Movie Awards	2018	Best Actor in a Negative Role (Malayalam)	Njan Marykutty	Nominated
South Indian International Movie Awards	2019	Best Actor in a Supporting Role (Malayalam)	June	Nominated
South Indian International Movie Awards	2020	Best Actor in a Supporting Role (Malayalam)	Halal Love Story	Won
South Indian International Movie Awards	2026	Best Debut Director	Pani	Won
Asianet Film Awards	2017	Special Jury Award (Actor)	Udaharanam Sujatha	Won
Asianet Film Awards	2018	Special Jury Award (Actor)	Joseph	Won
Vanitha Film Awards	2017	Most popular movie	Udaharanam Sujatha	Won
Vanitha Film Awards	2018	Performer of the Year	Joseph	Won
CPC Cine Awards	2026	Best Actor	Joseph	Won
Thikkurissi Film Awards	2026	Best Actor	Narayaneente Moonnaanmakkal	Won
Asiavision Awards	2018	Best Character Actor	Joseph	Won
Flowers Indian Film Awards	2018	Best Character Actor	Udaharanam Sujatha; Ramante Edanthottam	Won
Flowers Indian Film Awards	2018	Best Film on Social Commitment	Udaharanam Sujatha	Won
North American Film Awards (NAFA)	2017	Best Character Actor	Action Hero Biju	Won
North American Film Awards (NAFA)	2018	Best Actor in a Negative Role	Ramante Edanthottam	Won
Movie Street Film Awards	2019	Best Actor	Joseph	Won
Red FM Malayalam Music Awards	2019	Best Folk song	"Pandu Paadavarambathiloode" (Joseph)	Won
Golden Sparrow Award at 3rd Diorama International Film Festival	2021	Best Actor	Nayattu	Won
