= Bluff Master =

Bluff Master may refer to:

- Bluff Master (1963 film), a Hindi film directed by Manmohan Desai
- Bluff Master (2018 film), a Telugu film directed by Gopi Ganesh Pattabhi

== See also ==
- Bluffmaster!, a 2005 Hindi film directed by Rohan Sippy
