= T. R. Shamsudheen =

Indian educationist and film producer

- T. R. Shamsudheen with Former President of India A. P. J. Abdul Kalam
- Born: Thoppilthodi Raheem Shamsudheen; 12 May; Thrissur, Kerala, India
- Education: Jawahar Navodaya Vidyalaya; Anna University
- Occupations: Entrepreneur, film producer
- Spouse: Alka Shamsudheen

Thoppilthodi Raheem Shamsudheen is an Indian educationist, film producer and technocrat. He is the producer of Malayalam movies 1983 and Queen. Besides his contributions to film, Shamsudheen is the chairman of the Cochin College of Engineering and Technology and Cochin Institute of Science & Technology. He is also an angel investor and technologist and is involved with multiple technology start-ups and media-related technology solutions.

== Early life ==
Born to K Raheem and Khadeeja Beevi, Shamsudheen completed his schooling in Jawahar Navodaya Vidyalaya, Thrissur and earned a Bachelor of Technology from Anna University, Chennai through St Michael College of Engineering & Technology, Sivaganga, Tamil Nadu. During his undergraduate years, Shamsudheen was active in his entrepreneurial efforts and garnered a reputation for helping his undergraduate institution improve its admission rates. Based on his experience with undergraduate engineering education in the state, at the age of 24, Shamsudheen set up the Malabar College of Engineering and Technology (MCET) at Pallur, Thrissur, Kerala in 2009, in partnership with a businessman from Malappuram, Kerala. The institution was inaugurated by the former President of India, Dr. APJ Abdul Kalam.

== Entrepreneurship ==
In 2012, he moved out of the trust managing MCET and sold his shares in the college to go solo with his entrepreneurial ventures. He established the Cochin College of Engineering & Technology (CCET) at Valancherry, Malappuram, Kerala and Cochin Institute of Science & Technology (CISAT) at Mannathur, Muvattupuzha, Kerala in the same year. He serves as the chairman of both institutions and the colleges are affiliated to APJ Abdul Kalam Technological University and sanctioned by the All India Council for Technical Education (AICTE). The Innovations and Entrepreneurship Cell of CISAT was inaugurated by former President of India Dr. APJ Abdul Kalam in 2015.

== Movie production ==
In 2013, Shamsudheen started the film production company Shams Films which produced the Malayalam movie 1983. While Shamsudheen himself was a debutant in film production, the director of the movie Abrid Shine and actor Nikki Galrani also made their debut in this movie which involved a family drama taking place around the game of cricket. The movie 1983 went on to win many awards for Best Background score (National Award), Best Actor, Best Debut Director & Best Supporting Actor (Kerala State Awards), Best Female Debut & Best Lyricist (Filmfare Awards).

In 2017, Shamsudheen co-produced the Malayalam movie Queen which was released in February 2018, by a debutant Director Dijo Jose Antony. The movie went on to become a box office success.

In 2021, Shamsudheen produced the movie, Kaanekkaane, starring Tovino Thomas, Aishwarya Lekshmi, Suraj Venjaramoodu, Shruti Ramachandran, Prem Prakash in important roles. The movie is planned to release through the SonyLIV OTT Platform on 17 September 2021.

== Awards and recognitions ==
He is the recipient of the 2015 Emerging Entrepreneur Award from the Junior Chamber International, Kochi chapter, the 2017 Edupreneur Award by Microtec Educational Consultants and the 2015 Young Entrepreneur Award by DC Books.

== Professional memberships ==
Shamsudheen holds professional memberships in the Kerala Chamber of Commerce & Industry, The Indus Entrepreneurs, Kerala Chapter and the Kerala Film Chamber of Commerce.
