= Konidela Production Company =

Indian film studio

- Type: Private
- Industry: Entertainment
- Founded: 2016
- Founder: Ram Charan
- Headquarters: Hyderabad, India
- Area served: Telugu Cinema
- Key people: Ram Charan
- Products: Films
- Services: Film production , Film distribution
- Owner: Ram Charan
- Subsidiaries: Anjana Productions; Pawan Kalyan Creative Works; Pink Elephant Pictures; Gold Box Entertainments; V Mega Pictures

Konidela Production Company is an Indian film production company established by actor Ram Charan.

== Production ==
Year	Film	Director	Language	Actors
2017	Khaidi No. 150	V. V. Vinayak	Telugu	Chiranjeevi, Kajal Aggarwal
2019	Sye Raa Narasimha Reddy	Surender Reddy	Telugu	Chiranjeevi, Amitabh Bachchan, Nayanthara, Tamannaah, Sudeep, Vijay Sethupathi, Jagapathi Babu
2022	Acharya	Koratala Siva	Telugu	Chiranjeevi, Ram Charan, Pooja Hegde, Sonu Sood, Jisshu Sengupta
2022	Godfather	Mohan Raja	Telugu	Chiranjeevi, Salman Khan, Nayanthara, Satyadev

== Film Distribution ==
No	Year	Film	Language	Actors	Notes
1	2018	Rangasthalam	Telugu	Ram Charan, Samantha, Aadhi Pinisetty, Jagapati Babu, Prakash Raj	Co distribution with UV Creations and Mythri Movie Makers
2	2022	Godfather	Telugu	Chiranjeevi, Nayanthara, Salman Khan	Distribution by PVR Pictures, Magic Frames
