= Janakan =

- Theatrical release poster
- Directed by: N. R. Sanjeev
- Written by: S. N. Swami
- Produced by: M. C. Arun Nair; Sudeep Karakkat
- Starring: Mohanlal; Suresh Gopi
- Cinematography: Sanjeev Shankar
- Edited by: G. Murali; Sangeeth Kollam
- Music by: C. Rajamani
- Production company: Line of Colours
- Distributed by: Maxlaab Entertainments
- Release date: 8 April 2010
- Running time: 122 minutes
- Country: India
- Language: Malayalam

Janakan (transl. Father) is a 2010 Indian Malayalam-language crime thriller film directed by N. R. Sanjeev (in his directorial debut) and written by S. N. Swami, starring Mohanlal and Suresh Gopi. The music was composed by M. Jayachandran. It was released on 8 April 2010 in Kerala and was distributed by Maxlab Entertainments. Janakan is credited as the 200th film appearance of Suresh Gopi. The film won the Kerala state Film Award for Best playback singer - Female for Rajalakshmy for the song "Olichirunne".

== Plot ==
Vishwanathan is a man who murdered three people who raped his only daughter Seetha alias Anu, a college-going girl. Anu is raped by her boyfriend Reji and his uncle's Kuttiyachan and ACP Vikraman after he cheats her and forces her to come to their house. She is raped for a few days. She gets killed by Vikraman in the hospital, through carbon dioxide poisoning.

Suryanarayanan, is an advocate who comes to the Vishwam's rescue. Surya is one of the best lawyers in the country and is known to have a way with words. Suryanarayanan takes it upon himself to release Vishwam from the clutches of the judiciary, because he is convinced of the man's justice.

Monai and Pazhani are Vishwam's friends, who accompany him to visit Suryanarayanan. The rest of the story is how Suryanarayanan saves Viswam and his friends from punishment.

== Cast ==
- Mohanlal as Adv. Suryanarayanan
- Suresh Gopi as Vishwanathan
- Biju Menon as Monayi
- Harisree Ashokan as Pazhani
- Priya Lal as Seetha Viswanathan (Anu)
- Jyothirmayi as Dr. Rani Mathew
- Kaveri as Nirmala Vishwanathan
- Rejith Menon as Ambarish Divakaran
- Vijayaraghavan as City Police Commissioner Lokanathan IPS
- K. B. Ganesh Kumar as ACP Rajeev Kumar IPS
- Vijayakumar as Assistant Commissioner Jayapalan IPS
- Shivaji Guruvayoor as Home Minister Divakaran
- Sampath Ram as ACP Vikraman IPS
- Dinesh Panicker as Kuttiyachan
- Arun V. Narayan as Reji / Vijeesh
- Chali Pala as CI Haridas
- Krishna Nair as SI Shyama
- Krishna Praba as Raji
- Pratheesh Nandhan
- Kalesh Kallakoddu

== Production ==
Director N. R. Sanjeev, also known as Saji Paravoor, had previously worked on movies like Mazha (2000), Makante Achan (2009), Sethurama Iyer CBI (2004), Mahasamudram, Nerariyan CBI (2005) and Yes Your Honour (2006), and had assisted several well-known directors. The script was written by S. N. Swami, known for his thriller screenplays. Sajeev Shanker was the cinematographer, and editing was done by B. Murali. The music was composed by music director M. Jayachandran and lyrics were by Gireesh Puthenchery. Mahadevan Thampi was the still photographer of this movie. Malayalam Serial actress Sree Kutty stated through her YouTube channel that she was actually called for the daughter role. Unfortunately, she rejected the role as she had already signed as a heroine for Tamil film.

Janakan was filmed in Thiruvananthapuram and surrounding areas in Kerala.

== Soundtrack ==
Music for the film was composed by M. Jayachandran with lyrics by Gireesh Puthenchery. The film contains one song "Olichirunne" sung by Rajalakshmy. The soundtrack album was released by Satyam Audios.

1. "Olichirunne", Rajalakshmy – 4:06

== Release ==
The movie was released on 8 April 2010.

=== Reception ===
Sify.com gave a "watchable" verdict and said "There are no real experiments here, true, but the film has its moments and as they say, the heart at the right place. Though the film is just above two hours, it could have been more enjoyable, if it was shorter by some 20 minutes or so". Indiaglitz.com stated it "above average" and added "With a relevant message and above average narratives, 'Janakan' may find needed audiences, to end up as a safer movie at the Box Office.". Paresh C Palicha of Rediff.com rated 2.5 out of 5 and said "Janakan is promising. In short, this film heavily depends on the actors to pull it off after the initial excitement dies down. So, Mohanlal has to use his aura to the maximum which he does, making his fans happy. Suresh Gopi in the subdued rustic role wins hands down. Biju Menon and Harisree Asokan are mostly mute supporters. It is pleasantly surprising to see Harisree not in a separate comic track. Jyothirmayi, in the meaty role of Dr Rani Mathew, does well.". Ibnlive.in.com rated 2.5 out of 5 and concluded "Director Sanjeev has tried to give a new angle to a story that's already been told several times, but he has failed to use class actors Mohanlal, Suresh Gopi and Biju Menon up to their potential. A watchable movie, if you don't expect much!". Nowrunning.com gave an average rating of 2 out of 5 and said "Janakan tells a new age story that's already been told. There is no denying the societal renovation that it aims at, but perhaps it needed to reinvent its modes of delivery.".

=== Box office ===
The film was a moderate success at the box office.

=== Awards ===
- Kerala State Film Award for Best Female Playback Singer - Rajalakshmy
- Kerala Film Critics Association Award for Best Popular Film
