= Love (2026 TV series) =

#Love
- Poster
- Genre: Romantic comedy
- Written by: Nirmal Williams
- Directed by: Balaji Mohan
- Starring: Arjun Das; Aishwarya Lekshmi
- Composer: Sean Roldan
- Country of origin: India
- Original language: Tamil
- No. of seasons: 1
- No. of episodes: 6

Production
- Executive producer: Jithin Thorai
- Producer: Soundarya Rajinikanth
- Editor: Sai Muthuraman
- Running time: 24–30 minutes
- Production company: May6 Entertainment Factory

Original release
- Network: Netflix
- Release: 2 October 2026

#Love (pronounced Hashtag Love) is a 2026 Indian Tamil-language romantic comedy television series. The series stars Arjun Das and Aishwarya Lekshmi. The plot follows a romance between two rival dating-app founders with opposing philosophies on love.

#Love was produced by Soundarya Rajinikanth under the May6 Entertainment Factory banner and consists of six episodes, all directed by Balaji Mohan. The series was released in its entirety on Netflix on 2 October 2026.

== Episodes ==
Title	Episode	Directed by	Written by	Original release date
1	"Episode 1"	Balaji Mohan	Unknown	2 October 2026
2	"Episode 2"	Balaji Mohan	Unknown	2 October 2026
3	"Episode 3"	Balaji Mohan	Unknown	2 October 2026
4	"Episode 4"	Balaji Mohan	Unknown	2 October 2026
5	"Episode 5"	Balaji Mohan	Unknown	2 October 2026
6	"Episode 6"	Balaji Mohan	Unknown	2 October 2026

== Cast ==
- Arjun Das as Matthew Jebaraj
- Aishwarya Lekshmi as Tara Krishnan
- Arjun Chidambaram as Harish
- Gayatri Hariharan as Mridhula
- Namita Krishnamurthy as Mia Jebaraj
- Harini Sundararajan as Sylvia
- Abishek Joseph George as George
- R Badree as Chakri Gopalakrishnan
- Arjun Manohar as Arjun (Jay)

== Production ==
The series was announced in October 2025. It was produced by Soundarya Rajinikanth and she also serves as showrunner. Balaji Mohan, who directed all episodes, was not part of the writing team unlike his previous directorial ventures. He explained, "Directing scripts that have already been completed, like #Love, requires me to understand the idea and see if it resonates with me". He added that the series was being developed over a year: "Extensive work was already involved in the project, and it did not necessitate my intervention".

== Release and reception ==
The series was released in its entirety on Netflix on 2 October 2026. Jayabhuvaneshwari B of Cinema Express rated the entire series 2.5/5 and wrote, "Aishwarya Lekshmi, Arjun Das, and bold ideas make this series bingeable, but Balaji Mohan's signature charm feels lost amid underdeveloped storylines". Udita Jhunjhunwala of Scroll.in wrote, "#Love gives the familiar romantic question a contemporary spin through dating apps, algorithms and start-up culture. The result is breezy viewing that raises potentially interesting questions about how we connect". Puja Talwar of The Federal wrote, "#Love is a breezy, pacy watch and wins its quiet argument: between compatibility and chemistry, love is less a matter of algorithms than of showing up as you are, glitches and all".

Anisha Rao of India Today said it "has a clever premise, attractive leads, some genuinely touching side stories and enough visual polish to make for an easy watch. But it is caught between being a breezy rom-com and a deeper examination of love in the dating-app era". M. Suganth of The Times of India wrote, "Despite a premise with potential, #Love treads very familiar territory in a very predictable manner with characters and scenes that seem like a checklist of romance tropes from American TV shows", although the lead actors "look their parts and are likeable, which might help those with a sweet tooth for candyfloss romance stick on through the six episodes".
