= Guvva Gorinka =

Indian Telugu-language romance film

- Theatrical release poster
- Directed by: Mohan Bammidi
- Written by: Mohan Bammidi
- Produced by: B. Jeevan Reddy; Kosanam Damu Reddy
- Starring: Satyadev; Priyaa Lal
- Cinematography: Mailesan Rangaswamy
- Edited by: Pranav Mistry
- Music by: Suresh Bobbili
- Production companies: Mango Mass Media; Akar Works
- Distributed by: Amazon Prime Video
- Release date: 17 December 2020
- Running time: 121 minutes
- Country: India
- Language: Telugu

Guvva Gorinka (transl. Dove and myna) is a 2020 Indian Telugu-language romantic drama film written and directed by Mohan Bammidi.The film is based on the 2015 French movie “Blind date”. The film stars Satyadev and Priyaa Lal, with Priyadarshi Pulikonda, Chaitanya Rao Madadi, Madhumita and Rahul Ramakrishna playing other roles. The film is produced by B. Jeevan Reddy and Damu Reddy Kosanam. The music is composed by Bobbili Suresh. The film premiered on 17 December 2020 on Amazon Prime Video.

== Plot ==
Sadanand (Satyadev) is a mechanical engineer who wants to invent a soundless vehicle. On the other hand, Siresha (Priyaa Lal) is a musician who comes to Hyderabad to do her Masters's. They live in adjoining flats and somehow stumble upon each other by talking from their homes. They don't see each other but keep talking for a long time. This casual conversation develops into friendship and eventually, they fall in love. What happens to them in the course of time forms the story of the film.

== Cast ==
- Satyadev as Sadanand aka Silencer
- Priyaa Lal as Sirisha aka Violin
- Chaitanya Rao Madadi as Arya, Harika's boyfriend
- Madhumitha Krishna as Harika, Sirisha's friend
- Priyadarshi Pulikonda as Raghu Ram, Sadanand's friend
- Rahul Ramakrishna
- Fish Venkat as Sadanand's father
- Prabhakar as Sirisha's father
- Mangli as Prank reporter
- Bitthiri Sathi

== Production ==
The film was initially launched in 2017, but due to various reasons the filming was delayed. Finally, the film was released on Amazon Prime in 2020.

== Reception ==
Thadhagath Pathi of The Times of India wrote that, "When you read the title Guvva Gorinka, you expect a cutesy love story that reflects the chemistry between two beautiful souls. But director Mohan Babu does anything but that. The concept of falling in love without meeting each other is not new to Tollywood but the writing of this film is what lets it down." Surya Prakash of Asianet News rated the film 1/5 and criticized it wafer-thin storyline. He compared the film's premise with the 2003 film Turn Left, Turn Right but added that script failed to raise beyond it."
