= Kaanekkaane =

2021 film by Manu Ashokan

- Promotional poster
- Directed by: Manu Ashokan
- Written by: Bobby and Sanjay
- Produced by: T. R. Shamsudheen
- Starring: Suraj Venjaramoodu; Tovino Thomas; Aishwarya Lekshmi; Shruti Ramachandran
- Cinematography: Alby Antony
- Edited by: Abhilash Balachandran
- Music by: Ranjin Raj
- Production company: DreamKatcher
- Distributed by: SonyLIV
- Release date: 17 September 2021 (India)
- Running time: 120 minutes
- Country: India
- Language: Malayalam

Kaanekkaane is a 2021 Indian Malayalam-language drama thriller film written by Bobby and Sanjay and directed by Manu Ashokan. The film stars Suraj Venjaramoodu, Tovino Thomas, Aishwarya Lekshmi and Shruthi Ramachandran in important roles. The film which was produced by T. R. Shamsudheen under the banner of DreamKatcher, made a direct release through SonyLIV on 17 September 2021.

== Plot ==
Deputy Tahsildar Paul Mathai arrives in town for some court dealings. He visits his late daughter Sherin's house to meet his long-seen grandson Kuttu. Her husband Allen is now married to Sneha and leading a seemingly happy life which irks Paul out of jealousy, mostly against the new woman for taking his daughter's role as mother. Even though Paul decides to accept the situation, he is suddenly taken aback by an abrupt revelation about the death of his daughter which prompts him to seek justice through any means available. An emotional transverse through vulnerable human conditions.

== Cast ==
- Suraj Venjaramoodu as Paul P. Mathai
- Tovino Thomas as Allen
- Aishwarya Lekshmi as Sneha George
- Shruti Ramachandran as Sherin P. Allen
- Prem Prakash as George, Sneha's father
- Rony David as Advocate Prasanth
- Binu Pappu as the Police Officer
- Dhanya Mary Varghese as Zarine, the Marriage Counselor
- Master Alok Krishna as Aaron "Kuttu" Allen
- Sruthy Jayan as Tara, Sherin's friend
- Sreeja Das as Sreekala

== Production ==
The film was announced by the director through the social media on 26 September 2020. The film marks the second directional of Manu Ashokan after the film Uyare and is the second movie in which Aishwarya Lekshmi and Tovino Thomas reunites after the film Mayanadi. The shooting of the film began in Ernakulam on 18 October 2020 after the Pooja Ceremony. Tovino Thomas who was undergoing rest after getting injured during the shoot of the movie Kala, joined the set during the first week of November. After a single schedule of about one and half months, the shooting was completed during the start of December 2020. The dubbing and other post production works of the movie was completed by the end of January 2021. The first look poster of the film was launched on January 21, 2021, by Mammotty, Manju Warrier, Indrajith Sukumaran, Asif Ali and other few actors, on Tovino's birthday. The teaser of the film was released on September 11, 2021. The trailer of the film was released on September 12, 2021

Alby Antony has been roped in as the cinematographer and Abhilash Balachandran is the editor of the movie. Dileep Nath does the art work in the movie. Sreya Aravind is the costume designer and makeup of the film is handled by Jayan Poonkunnam.

== Music ==
Ranjin Raj is the music director of the movie. He has composed the song and did the background scores of the movie. The film has a single song titled Palnilavin Poykayil. The veteran singer G. Venugopal sings the male version of the song and Sithara Krishnakumar sings its female version The lyrics of the song was penned by Vinayak Sasikumar.

== Awards and nominations ==
Award	Category	Recipient	Result	Ref.
52nd Kerala State Film Awards	Best Female Playback Singer	Sithara Krishnakumar	Won	
10th South Indian International Movie Awards	Best Actress (Malayalam)	Aishwarya Lekshmi	Won	
10th South Indian International Movie Awards	Best Actress in a Supporting Role (Malayalam)	Shruti Ramachandran	Nominated	
10th South Indian International Movie Awards	Best Music Director (Malayalam)	Ranjin Raj	Nominated	
10th South Indian International Movie Awards	Best Female Playback Singer (Malayalam)	Sithara Krishnakumar	Nominated	
10th South Indian International Movie Awards	Best Lyricist (Malayalam)	Vinayak Sasikumar	Nominated	
OTT Play Awards 2022	Best Emerging OTT Star	Aishwarya Lekshmi	Won	

== Release ==
The film was not released in theatre due to the COVID-19 pandemic and was directly released on the OTT Platform, SonyLIV on September 17, 2021. It was the first Malayalam movie to be premiered through SonyLIV.

== Reception ==
The movie opened to generally positive reviews from critics and audiences alike. The Times Of India gave a rating of 3.5 on 5 for the movie and commented that, "Kaanekkane is an emotional ride throughout, exploring the scenario from the point-of-view of each of the imperfect characters involved, through its non-linear narration." S. R. Praveen of The Hindu wrote that, "The ‘Uyare’ director's latest film works when it patiently unravels its many layers, but spoils it with a convenient stitching-up towards the end". Sawmya Rajendran of The News Minute said that, "Kaanekkaane is certainly among the better thrillers to have come out of Malayalam cinema in recent times. Within its runtime of just over two hours, Kaanekkaane keeps us on the edge, for the most part, unable to choose which of the characters should triumph." Indian Express gave a rating of 3 on 5 for the film and wrote that, "All actors delivered strong performance, Suraj's performance as Paul Mathai was outstanding in the film, which explores how difficult it is to look someone you love in the eye and tell them you have wronged them.

Pinkvilla rated 3 on 5 for the movie and said that, "The movie engages with its clear, coherent character work, its self-contained moral takeaways and amazing performances and it sheds some light on the darkest pitfalls of human nature that has not been delved with much finesse that sure sheds some light on the dark edges of our souls that stay hidden under the seemingly perfect outside." The Firstpost gave a rating of 3.5 on 5 for the movie and said that, "Kaanekkaane is at one level a thriller, but an unconventional addition to that genre since the big reveal comes much before the climax and the heart and soul of Kaanekkaane is Suraj Venjaramoodu who has had an incredible journey in recent years from character artiste to leading man."
