= Godfather (2022 film) =

2022 Indian film by Mohan Raja

- Theatrical release poster
- Directed by: Mohan Raja
- Screenplay by: Mohan Raja
- Dialogues by: Lakshmi Bhupal
- Based on: Lucifer by Murali Gopy (2019)
- Produced by: R. B. Choudary; N. V. Prasad; Listin Stephen; Ram Charan; Upasana Kamineni
- Starring: Chiranjeevi; Nayanthara; Satyadev
- Cinematography: Nirav Shah; Chota K. Naidu (1 song)
- Edited by: Marthand K. Venkatesh
- Music by: Thaman S
- Production companies: Konidela Production Company; Super Good Films
- Distributed by: PVR Pictures; Magic Frames
- Release date: 5 October 2022
- Running time: 157 minutes
- Country: India
- Language: Telugu
- Budget: ₹100 crore
- Box office: est. ₹105.5 crore

GodFather is a 2022 Indian Telugu-language political action thriller film directed by Mohan Raja. The film stars Chiranjeevi in the title role, alongside Nayanthara, and Satyadev while Salman Khan makes a cameo appearance, which marks his Telugu debut. It is produced by R. B. Choudary and N. V. Prasad under the Konidela Production Company and the Super Good Films' banners. It is a remake of the 2019 Malayalam film Lucifer. When the supreme leader of the ruling party dies, leaving a huge vacuum, not only in the electoral and leadership spheres of the party but also that of the state. In the inevitable succession squabble the thin line that separates good and bad becomes irrecoverably blurred. Whoever will succeed him forms the plot.

Principal photography commenced in August 2021 with filming taking place in Hyderabad, Ooty and Mumbai. The music is composed by Thaman S with cinematography handled by Nirav Shah. Godfather was released theatrically on 5 October 2022. It received mixed reviews from critics and audiences.

== Plot ==
At Interpol's office in France, an officer hands over his unsolvable case about the mysterious smuggler kingpin, Abraham Qureshi, to his junior. Meanwhile, in Andhra Pradesh, Chief Minister (CM) Padmakanth Reddy (PKR), leader of the ruling Jana Jagruti Party (JJP), dies in the hospital. Acting CM Narayana Varma exploits the situation, inciting riots outside the hospital to benefit the upcoming election.

Govardhan, a truth-seeker, condemns PKR in a live YouTube stream, revealing that he was a puppet controlled by a financial syndicate. He asserts that the JJP has twice the money of the state's treasury and that PKR's successor is crucial. He lists four potential candidates: Sathyapriya, Jaidev Das, Narayana Varma, and Brahma Teja.

Sathyapriya, PKR's daughter, is married to Jaidev, a drug dealer involved in real estate and Hawala scams. Varma, due to his seniority and lobbying skills, believes he is the rightful successor. Brahma, PKR's secret first child, is labeled as the "most dangerous" by Govardhan and known for his corporate contract work in Chennai.

In Mumbai, Jaidev and Varma meet Abdul, Jaidev's partner, discussing how PKR had given Jaidev an ultimatum to stop his illegal activities. With PKR's death, Jaidev plans to fund the JJP with drug money, striking a deal with Lukas to transfer ₹750 crore (US$90 million) monthly in exchange for unchecked drug imports into Hyderabad. To proceed, Jaidev must set up a discreet drug factory on a government-sealed roadside.

During PKR's last rites in Hyderabad, Sathya asks Varma to prevent Brahma from attending. Varma's enforcer, Indrajeet, fails to stop Brahma. That night, Jaidev gives malana cream to Sathya's sister, Jhanvi, and informs JJP ministers about his plan to dissolve the ministry, advance elections, and nominate himself as CM. Varma advises negotiating with Brahma, the current financier, but Brahma refuses to fund the party with drug money, threatening Jaidev instead. Enraged, Jaidev bribes 140 MLAs to support his nomination as CM.

Jaidev's men set up the drug factory, but Brahma kills them. Jaidev's mole, Koti, reports this to both Brahma and Jaidev. Indrajeet finds no evidence at the factory. From Sathya's diary, Jaidev learns of her resentment towards Brahma, who was favored by their father. Koti persuades Renuka to falsely accuse Brahma of abuse, leading to his arrest and imprisonment. In prison, Brahma receives a call from his contractor and trusted aide, Masood Bhai. Jaidev sends goons to kill Brahma in prison, but the attempt fails.

Brahma sabotages Lukas's containers while transferring bribe money. He meets Govardhan, providing evidence of JJP workers' corruption and explaining his drug trade involvement. Koti and Renuka confess their lies about Brahma on national news, leading to his release. Jhanvi is hospitalized after a drug overdose, revealing Jaidev's predatory behavior towards her. When confronted, Jaidev admits his crimes and threatens Sathya and Jhanvi. Sathya seeks Brahma's help, who vows to protect them.

Brahma kills Indrajeet and clears the NNTV news channel's debts, giving control to Sathya. He and Masood Bhai blackmail Varma and the MLAs into allying with him. Jaidev kidnaps Jhanvi, forcing Sathya to announce him as CM. Brahma and Masood Bhai kill Jaidev's associates and confront Jaidev. Lukas reveals that Brahma is actually Abraham Qureshi, the "Godfather." Defeated, Jaidev kills himself. Sathya becomes the new JJP president and CM, while Brahma heads to Paris with Masood Bhai. There, they gather and eliminate major drug lords.

== Cast ==
- Chiranjeevi as Brahma Teja / Abraham Qureshi
  - Master Gaurav as adoloscent Brahma
- Nayanthara as Sathyapriya
  - Ahana as young Sathya
- Satya Dev as Jaidev Das
- Murali Sharma as Narayana Verma
- Tanya Ravichandran as Jaanvi
- Samuthirakani as ACP Indrajeet IPS
- Sarvadaman D. Banerjee as CM Padmakanth Ramdas Reddy "PKR"
- Sunil as Koti
- Brahmaji as Narasimha Reddy
- Divi Vadthya as Renuka
- Shafi as Murugan
- Sayaji Shinde as Bangaram Naidu
- Bharath Reddy as Ram Prasad
- Kasthuri Shankar as Brahma's mother and PKR's secret wife
- Anasuya Bharadwaj as Swetha Ram Prasad's wife
- Murali Mohan as an elder man in Ashram
- Pragathi as Sowjanya
- Nawab Shah as Abdul
- Gangavva as Kanthamma
- Mark Bennington as Lukas
- Harsha Vardhan as Jailer
- Puri Jagannadh as Govardhan
- Salman Khan as Mazoom Bhai (cameo appearance)
- Prabhu Deva as himself in the song "Thaar Maar Thakkar Maar"
- Hira Warina as a dancer in the item number "Blast Baby"

== Production ==
=== Development ===
The Telugu remake of the 2019 Malayalam film Lucifer was announced in April 2020 with Chiranjeevi in the lead role. Sujeeth was signed to direct the project, who had also started working on the script for the Telugu adaptation. Sujeeth opted out of the project in September 2020 due to creative differences. Later, V. V. Vinayak was approached in replace him. In December 2020, Mohan Raja was confirmed as the director, marking his return to Telugu cinema after 20 years. Hanuman Junction (2001) was his first and only Telugu film until then. The film was officially launched in January 2021 with a traditional pooja ceremony in Hyderabad. The film marks the maiden collaboration of Chiranjeevi with composer Thaman S. Nirav Shah was signed as the cinematographer. It was to be produced by Konidela Production Company and Super Good Films. The film's title was unveiled as Godfather in August 2021.

=== Casting ===
In September 2021, Nayanthara, Biju Menon and Satyadev entered talks to sign the film. Nayanthara and Satyadev were confirmed to be a part of the film in November and the latter was signed in to play the main antagonist in this film. Gangavva plays a supporting role next to Chiranjeevi in the film. Director Puri Jagannadh had a special role in the film. Bigg Boss 4 contestant Divi Vadthya joined the film as Chiranjeevi promised her a role in the season's finale.

In August 2021, Bollywood actor Salman Khan was approached to play a key role in the film. In November, Thaman confirmed that Khan would star alongside Chiranjeevi, in addition to appearing a dance number, thus marking Khan's debut in Telugu cinema. Khan reportedly portrays the role of Zayed Masood (Prithviraj Sukumaran) from Lucifer.

=== Filming ===
Principal photography of the film began on 13 August 2021. The first schedule of the film took place in Hyderabad. The second schedule of the film began in September 2021 in Ooty. Shooting was halted in October as Chiranjeevi underwent a surgery on his right hand which was followed by a 15-day bed rest. He resumed the shoot in November 2021 in Hyderabad. In January 2022, the actor tested positive for COVID-19 and therefore had to quarantine himself. This proceeded to shoot a few crucial scenes that didn't involve him during which Nayanthara joined the production. Chiranjeevi joined the sets back in February following his recovery. Salman Khan completed filming his portions in March 2022 in a week-long schedule at ND Studios, Karjat, Mumbai. Khan also shot for a song alongside Chiranjeevi in Hyderabad under the choreography of Prabhu Deva.

== Music ==
Godfather

Soundtrack album by Thaman S
- Released: 4 October 2022
- Recorded: 2021–2022
- Genre: Feature film soundtrack
- Length: 21:26
- Language: Telugu
- Label: Saregama
- Producer: Thaman S

Thaman S chronology
| Thank You (2022) | Godfather (2022) | Prince (2022) |
External audio
- Godfather - Full Album on YouTube

Singles from Godfather
- 1. "Thaar Maar Thakkar Maar" Released: 15 September 2022; 2. "Najabhaja" Released: 27 September 2022; 3. "Godfather - Title Song" Released: 3 October 2022

The film score and soundtrack album of the film is composed by Thaman S. The music rights were acquired by Saregama. The first single titled "Thaar Maar Thakkar Maar" was released on 15 September 2022.

Telugu
| No. | Title | Lyrics | Singer(s) | Length |
|---|---|---|---|---|
| 1. | "Thaar Maar Thakkar Maar" | Anantha Sriram | Shreya Ghoshal | 4:28 |
| 2. | "Najabhaja" | Anantha Sriram | Sri Krishna, Prudhvi Chandra | 3:18 |
| 3. | "Godfather - Title Song" | Ramajogayya Sastry | Anudeep Dev, Aditya Iyengar, Raghuram, Saicharan Bhaskaruni, Arjun Vijay, Ritesh G Rao, Chaitu Satsangi, Bharat, Arun Kaundinya, Sri Krishna, Adviteeya, Sruthika, Pranathi, Pratyusha Pallapothu, Rachita, Vaishnavi, Harika Narayan, Sruthi Ranjani, Sahiti Chaganti | 2:46 |
| 4. | "Blast Baby" | Ramajogayya Sastry | Damini Bhatla, Blaaze | 3:39 |
| 5. | "Padara Sainika" | Ramajogayya Sastry | Sreerama Chandra | 4:09 |
| 6. | "Annayya" | Ramajogayya Sastry | Vaishnavi Kovvuri | 3:08 |
| Total length: | | | | 21:26 |

Hindi
| No. | Title | Lyrics | Singer(s) | Length |
|---|---|---|---|---|
| 1. | "Thaar Maar Thakkar Maar" | Vimal Kashyap | Shreya Ghoshal | 4:28 |
| 2. | "Dekho Dekho" | Vimal Kashyap | Ritesh G. Rao, Sai Charan Bhaskaruni | 3:18 |
| 3. | "Godfather - Title Song" | Vimal Kashyap | Anudeep Dev, Aditya Iyengar, Raghuram, Saicharan Bhaskaruni, Arjun Vijay, Ritesh G Rao, Chaitu Satsangi, Bharat, Arun Kaundinya, Sri Krishna, Adviteeya, Sruthika, Pranathi, Pratyusha Pallapothu, Rachita, Vaishnavi, Harika Narayan, Sruthi Ranjani, Sahiti Chaganti | 2:46 |
| 4. | "Blast Baby" | Vimal Kashyap | Blaaze, Pratyusha Pallapothu | 3:39 |
| 5. | "Chalo Chalo Sainiko" | Ritesh G. Rao | Sreerama Chandra | 4:09 |
| 6. | "Thu Hi Hai" | Vimal Kashyap | Vaishnavi Kovvuri | 3:08 |
| Total length: | | | | 21:26 |

== Release ==
=== Theatrical ===
Godfather was released in cinemas on 5 October 2022 in Telugu along with a Hindi dubbed version. The film is distributed in India by Konidela Production Company along with PVR Pictures while the overseas distribution is by Sarigama Cinemas through Phars Film. Worldwide theatrical rights of the film were sold at a cost of ₹91 crore. The Tamil dubbed version was released on 14 October 2022.

=== Home media ===
The film's digital streaming rights were acquired by Netflix at a cost of ₹57 crore. It has been reported from News18 that, the film producers have been offered ₹45 crore for the satellite and digital rights for the Hindi dubbed version of this film. The film was digitally streamed on Netflix from 19 November 2022. Gemini TV acquired satellite rights of the film. The received 7.08 TV in Urban and Rural Market across Telugu states.

== Reception ==
=== Critical response ===
Godfather opened to mixed reviews from critics.

Murali Krishna CH of The New Indian Express rated the film 3.5 out of 5 stars and wrote, "Watch it definitely for the Megastar, who delivers enough bang for your buck". Arvind V of Pinkvilla rated the film 3 out of 5 stars and wrote "Chiranjeevi, after a dull performance in Acharya, is terrific here. Satyadev delivers an award-winning output". Opining the same, Manoj Kumar R of The Indian Express appreciated Mohan Raja's work and stated that he "has steered clear of mystery and has turned GodFather into a full-fledged political drama".

Roktim Rajpal of India Today rated the film 3 out of 5 and wrote, "The Chiranjeevi-led political thriller is massier and more action-packed than the Malayalam version. GodFather is a grand celebration of the brand Chiranjeevi that proves to be a treat for the veteran hero's ardent fans". The Hans India rated the film with 3 out of 5, stating that the film is a decent one-time watch and offers something to cheer for Chiranjeevi's fans. Deepa Gahlot of Rediff.com rated the film with 3/5 stars, stating the film has a gracefully aged Chiranjeevi, who plays Brahma with a quiet but menacing look keeping the audience engaged.

Sowmya Rajendran of The News Minute rated the film 2.5 out of 5 stars and wrote "Director Mohan Raja seems to have been torn between his instincts to make a solid political thriller and the compulsions to pander to his leading man’s fanbase". Abhimanyu Mathur of Hindustan Times stated that, the film works only when Chiranjeevi is on screen, with the veteran actor more than holds his own and simply carries the film with his stardom and screen presence to save the film from flaws. On the contrary, Priyanka Sundar of Firstpost rated the film 2.5 out of 5 stars and wrote "The magic touch seems to be missing in GodFather. It is certainly not a movie that would put you to sleep, however, it is neither one that would elicit excitement either".

Paul Nicodemus of The Times of India gave a rating of 3.5 out of 5 stating that the film proves to be a worthy remake of the Malayalam original with Chiranjeevi coming up with a charismatic performance.

=== Box office ===
On the first day, it collected ₹21.7 crores include ₹15.7 crores from India and ₹7.0 crores overseas. In its first weekend, the film's box office collection was around ₹85 crores.
