= Maaman =

2025 Tamil film by Prasanth Pandiyaraj

- Theatrical release poster
- Directed by: Prasanth Pandiyaraj
- Screenplay by: Prasanth Pandiyaraj
- Story by: Soori
- Produced by: K. Kumar
- Starring: Soori; Rajkiran; Aishwarya Lekshmi; Swasika
- Cinematography: Dinesh Purushothaman
- Edited by: Ganesh Siva
- Music by: Hesham Abdul Wahab
- Production company: Lark Studios
- Distributed by: Sri Kumaran Films
- Release date: 16 May 2025
- Running time: 151 minutes
- Country: India
- Language: Tamil
- Box office: est. ₹50.75 crore

Maaman (transl. Maternal Uncle) (Note: also meant for Husband.) is a 2025 Indian Tamil-language action drama film directed by Prasanth Pandiyaraj, from a story written by Soori, and produced by K. Kumar under Lark Studios. The film stars Soori, alongside Rajkiran, Aishwarya Lekshmi, Swasika, Bala Saravanan, Baba Bhaskar, Viji Chandrasekhar, Nikhila Sankar and Geetha Kailasam.

Maaman released worldwide on 16 May 2025 in theaters to mixed reviews from critics, who praised the performances of the cast, especially Soori and Aishwarya, but criticised the plot and screenplay. Nevertheless, it was a successful venture in the box office

== Plot ==
In Trichy, Girija, Inba's sister, faces verbal taunts and abuse from her mother-in-law for being childless after over 10 years of marriage, despite seeking medical treatment and visiting temples. However, her life takes a turn when she confirms her pregnancy at a baby shower function and later gives birth to a baby boy, Nilan "Laddu". During this time, Inba's caring nature towards his sister catches the attention of Girija's doctor, Rekha, who develops feelings for him. As Inba and Rekha grow closer, they fall in love. Despite initial hesitation from Rekha's parents, they eventually approve of their marriage. As Inba and Rekha prepare to tie the knot, Laddu becomes a precocious and adamant presence in their lives, often inserting himself between the couple. During the wedding ceremony and even on their first night, Laddu insists on staying between Inba and Rekha. The couple tries to adjust to having Laddu by their side, but they struggle to find private moments amidst the chaos of family gatherings. In an attempt to find some intimacy, Inba takes Rekha to his grandfather's room, but their plans are foiled when the old cot breaks, embarrassing them in front of their relatives.

The family plans a honeymoon trip for the newlyweds, but Laddu's antics lead to its cancellation. An argument ensues between Inba and Rekha, with Rekha feeling that Inba prioritizes Laddu over her. In a heated moment, Inba swears to never meet Rekha again, but he along with his family later apologizes and convinces her to reconcile. The tension between Inba and Rekha escalates as Inba continues to prioritize Laddu, making Rekha express her desire for private time with Inba, but feels it's impossible with Laddu's constant presence. The situation worsens as Rekha distances herself from Girija. A misunderstanding leads Girija to believe that Rekha called Laddu "mental," causing a heated argument between Girija and her mother. Rekha explains that she said Laddu is hyperactive and needs counseling only, but Girija refuses to accept her explanation. The conflict peaks at Laddu's ear-piercing ceremony, where Girija accuses Rekha of insulting her son, with Girija chasing Inba and Rekha out of the ceremony and hitting her own son. Meanwhile, Rekha receives a transfer order to Madurai. Inba's father-in-law meets him, highlighting the importance of Ravi, Laddu's father, being involved in his son's life. Inba realizes the importance of balance and decides to move to Madurai with Rekha.

Meanwhile, Laddu becomes troubled and weepy, missing Inba. As Inba and Rekha settle into their new life, they grow closer, and Rekha becomes pregnant. However, Rekha discovers that Girija had told Laddu that Inba had died and the child had been mourning him. Rekha is furious, and a confrontation ensues. Inba and his mother, who knew this already are speechless. Girija pleads with her mother that she didn't do it intentionally, but just to control her son as he got fits due to Girija's beatings. The situation is further complicated when Ravi, Girija, and Laddu are involved in a road accident, and Laddu is severely injured. Inba rushes to the hospital, despite promising Rekha that he wouldn't. Rekha shouts at him stating, that he had skipped the promise that he made to his baby, meaning, that he doesn't care about Rekha or his child, but only his sister, and her family. Inba then slaps a pregnant Rekha. Feeling betrayed, Rekha throws away her thali, and applies for a divorce, while Inba lets her go, still hurt after knowing that she had intentionally got a transfer to Madurai, to separate him from his family.

Around the same time, Inba's aunt, Singarayar's wife, Pavunu, passes away and Singarayar follows her in death, leaving a deep impact on Inba and Rekha. Upon hearing Rekha's delivery, Inba visits the hospital, but Rekha's relatives bar him and his family from seeing the child. Girija apologizes to Rekha's family and Inba, acknowledging her role in their estrangement. Meanwhile, Laddu visits Rekha in the maternity ward and is delighted to see the twin babies. Laddu affectionately talks to the babies, assuming the role of their Paternal uncle. Moved by Laddu's innocence and love, Rekha begins to understand the bond between Inba and his nephew. Laddu apologizes to Rekha for being the reason for her separation from Inba. Inba also apologizes to Rekha for not finding a balance between his love for her and his family. Moved by each other's apologies, Inba and Rekha decide to put their differences aside, reunite, and resolve to live a loving life together, just like the elderly couple, Singam and Pavunu who loved each other till death.

== Cast ==
- Soori as Inba
- Rajkiran as Singarayar "Singam", Inba's relative grandfather
- Aishwarya Lekshmi as Rekha, Inba's wife (Voice dubbed by Ashmini Balakrishnan)
- Swasika as Girija, Inba's elder sister, Ravi's wife and Laddu's mother (Voice dubbed by Semmalar Annam)
- Saratha as Baba Bhaskar's Mother
- Master Prageeth Sivan as Nilan "Laddu"
- Baba Bhaskar as Ravi, Girija's Husband and Laddu's father
- Bala Saravanan as Selvam, Inba's friend
- Jayaprakash as Rekha's father
- Viji Chandrasekhar as Pavunu, Singam's wife
- Geetha Kailasam as Inba's and Girija's mother
- Kalaivani Bhaskar
- Melvin as Rekha's brother
- Nikhila Sankar as Anitha
- Tamilselvi as Rekha's aunt
- Vimal as a magician, Inba's friend (cameo appearance)

== Production ==
On 19 August 2024, before the theatrical release of Kottukkaali (2024), Soori announced his next project in the lead role with Bruce Lee (2017) and Vilangu (2022) fame Prasanth Pandiyaraj. The film marks the consecutive collaboration of K. Kumar's Lark Studios, with Soori after Garudan (2024). On 16 December 2024, the title of the film Maaman was revealed after an inaugural pooja ceremony in Trichy following which the production began. Aishwarya Lekshmi was cast as the female lead while Rajkiran was chosen for an important role and Lubber Pandhu (2024) fame Swasika as Soori's sister alongside Bala Saravanan, Baba Bhaskar, Viji Chandrasekhar, Nikhila Sankar, Geetha Kailasam and others in supporting roles. The film has cinematography handled by Dinesh Purushothaman, editing done by Ganesh Siva and music composed by Hesham Abdul Wahab. A few days before the release date announcement, Sivakarthikeyan made a surprise visit to the film's sets, sharing an emotional moment with Soori, with whom he had previously collaborated in Varuthapadatha Valibar Sangam (2013), Rajini Murugan (2016), and Don (2022).

== Music ==
Maaman

Soundtrack album by Hesham Abdul Wahab
- Genre: Feature film soundtrack
- Label: Think Music
- Producer: Hesham Abdul Wahab

Hesham Abdul Wahab chronology
Manamey (2024)	Maaman (2025)	Samshayam (2025)

Singles from Maaman
- 1. "Kallaliye Kallaliye" Released: 11 May 2025; 2. "Vizhuthe Thalavizhuthe" Released: 14 May 2025

The soundtrack and background is composed by Hesham Abdul Wahab in his Tamil debut. Think Music acquired the audio rights. After the pre-release event, the audio album containing 6 songs was released. The video song of the first single "Kallaliye Kallaliye" was released on 11 May 2025. The lyrical video of the second single "Vizhuthe Thalavizhuthe" released on 14 May 2025. The song "Kannale Pesuma" is based on "Pottu Thotta Pournami" from Hridayam.

Track listing
No.	Title	Lyrics	Singer(s)	Length
1.	"Kallaliye Kallaliye"	Vivek, Eknath	Hesham Abdul Wahab, Sharanya Srinivas	5:08
2.	"Azhage Agarame"	Vivek	Ravi G	3:43
3.	"Dheivamagane Dheivamagane"	Vivek	K. S. Harisankar	3:22
4.	"Kannale Pesuma"	Vivek	Shweta Mohan	2:59
5.	"Vizhuthe Thalavizhuthe"	Manikandan	Sean Roldan, Sanjana Kalmanje	3:05
6.	"Vaanam Kizhiyuthu"	Vivek	Job Kurian	2:48

== Release ==
=== Theatrical ===
Maaman was released theatrically on 16 May 2025 in theatres.

=== Distribution ===
The Tamil Nadu distribution rights were acquired by Rasi Chidambaram's Sri Kumaran Films. AV Media Consultancy acquired the distribution rights of the film for Karnataka.

=== Home media ===
The post-theatrical streaming rights of the film were bought by ZEE5 and the satellite rights of the film were bought by Zee Tamil and Zee Thirai.

== Reception ==
Maaman received mixed reviews from critics. Abhinav Subramanian of The Times of India rated with 2.5/5 stars and wrote "The strain of integrating into a close-knit family, the subtle power dynamics, even a child's need for boundaries. But it rarely commits to exploring them with any real depth. Instead, it often defaults to another scene of the nephew being, well, a lot." Avinash Ramachandran of Cinema Express gave 2.5/5 stars and wrote "Maaman worked as long as it was just about the primary conflict. However, in an attempt to make an overarching commentary on marriages and masculinity, the film misses out on delivering a more complete film." Kirubhakar Purushothaman of News 18 gave 2.5/5 stars and wrote "Maaman will strike many such chords throughout. If it doesn’t—and you squirm at the melodrama—the film will feel like a bundle of clichés. [...] The film is quietly skewed in Inba’s favour, even while pretending otherwise. Crucially, it never addresses how the family will resolve the Inba–Nilan dynamic. It’s implied that Reka will simply accept it." Janani K of India Today rated the film 2/5 stars and wrote "While the film sets up nice conflicts, it often gets subverted due to skewed ideas about family." Anusha Sundar of OTTPlay rated the film 2/5 stars and wrote "Soori's family drama suffers from misdirected emotions and overstretched familial bonds". Latha Srinivasan of Hindustan Times rated with 2/5 stars and wrote "this Soori Tamil drama is underwhelming and overly reliant on family sentiment."

Anandu Suresh of The Indian Express rated the film 1.5/5 stars and wrote "Maaman, in fact, shows that the makers missed a golden opportunity to create a full-fledged romantic film with the two." Bhuvanesh Chandar of The Hindu wrote "Director Prasanth Pandiyaraj’s film fails to build on its intriguing central conflict, and the many regressive undertones only take away from its good intentions.[...] Maaman, at the end of the day, makes a case for this sub-genre of family dramas centring around a joint family set in southern Tamil Nadu. After all, a family is a microcosm of a society."
