= Locked (miniseries) =

Indian crime thriller miniseries

- Promotional poster
- Genre: Crime; Thriller; Drama
- Written by: Pradeep Deva Kumar
- Directed by: Pradeep Deva Kumar
- Starring: Satyadev; Samyukta Hornad; Sri Lakshmi; Keshav Deepak; Aberaam Varma; Vasu Inturi; Bindu Pagidimarri; John Kottoly
- Composer: Prashanth Srinivas
- Country of origin: India
- Original language: Telugu
- No. of seasons: 1
- No. of episodes: 7

Production
- Executive producer: Ram Ganesan
- Producers: K.S. Madhubala; Shanmuga Raja
- Cinematography: Nijai Gowthaman
- Editor: Prasanna GK
- Running time: 25 minutes
- Production company: Tribal Horse Entertainment

Original release
- Network: Aha
- Release: 25 March – 27 March 2020

Locked is a 2020 Indian Telugu-language crime thriller miniseries written and directed by Pradeep Deva Kumar. It stars Satyadev, Samyukta Hornad, Sri Lakshmi, Keshav Deepak, Aberaam Varma, Vasu Inturi, Bindu Pagidimarri, and John Kottoly. The plot follows Dr. Anand Chakravarthy (Satya Dev), a neurosurgeon who is trapped inside his own mansion with uninvited guests and robbers. Season 1 has 7 episodes and premiered on Aha on 25 March 2020. In July 2021, the series was renewed for a second season.

== Plot ==
Dr. Anand Chakravarthy is a successful neurosurgeon who has never lost a patient, owing to his extensive research on brain surgeries. One day, he saves a child who is in a critical condition and leaves for his house. However, Padmini, a thief who wants money to provide a good life to her grand child hires Vaishnavi, an ex-IT employee who wants to take care of her mentally ill sister and Siva, a cab driver who tries to commit suicide due to his breakup for not having money becomes a gang to rob bachelor's homes. They entered Anand's house to carry out a robbery. After a lot of chaos, they try to outsmart Anand, but finally he gets hold of them and locks them in a room.

Meanwhile, his colleague, Dr. Misbah, an anesthesiologist, arrives at Anand's house as he’s tired of his wife Fatima’s suspicious nature. Though Anand does not want to host him, he agrees reluctantly. Much to the dismay of Misbah, Fatima also arrives in the house to share her feelings with Anand. Misbah and Fatima accuse each other of cheating. On the other hand, Inspector Sivalingam, who was at the house for a drink, finds a mysterious black cover filled with body organs. He questions Anand about it, threatening to arrest him. But Anand slices a knife through his stomach, killing him grotesquely. Fatima tries to escape, but she is caught by Anand's henchman.

Anand's junior, Avinash, is an admirer of Anand and owed him for saving his mother, by conducting a successful surgery on a rare tumor. Later, he finds out that Anand is carrying out research by kidnapping and killing homeless people. Then, he is also held captive by Anand. He explains his research to him that he is trying to bring a dead man back to life, by recreating the memory of the human brain. He decided to work on this research after his loving wife Sudha's death, a result of brain cancer. He announces that he was going to succeed in his research in a week by killing them and researching their brains. His aim is to being a man alive by bringing his memories back, through altering the memories. He announces to start the surgery with his wife and bring her back alive by recreating her memories.

As the night progresses, there is a power outage that gives the guests a chance to escape. While escaping, Fathima kills Anand's henchman, but the house is locked from outside. Then, however, Avinash has managed to escape and grabs Anand's research book and blackmails him to destroy the book in exchange for saving their lives. But Anand is not bothered by his warnings and says that his research is on his mind because he practically gained all the knowledge. He also says he was writing this book to his next generation of enthusiastic doctors like Avinash, who can make a better world to live in.

Meanwhile, all try to escape, but Anand holds them back again. After knowing that Siva had been killed and his brain is taken by Anand to experiment on, Padmini hatches a plan to kill Anand for saving their lives. In that struggle, Vaishnavi successfully escapes from the house and the house becomes dark.

Six months later, Vaishnavi is back in the IT industry. Anand gives a sudden visit to her house one day, offering her a lump sum for keeping his secrets, with a warning not to go against him. Vaishnavi curiously asks him about the remaining people to which Anand replies with a smirk and leaves, which indicates that he has killed all the people and taken their brains for his research. Later, depressed and dehydrated, Avinash leaves his class and heads home. He checks his head which had been operated. It is revealed that Avinash was shocked after looking at his mother among the abducted people and pleaded with Anand to spare him and his mother. Anand had done a mysterious surgery on him and let him go. The following day's newspaper front headline reads "successor in Hyderabad: Altering memory modules" which hints towards a new season.

== Cast ==
- Satyadev as Dr. Anand Chakravarthy
- Samyukta Hornad as Vaishnavi
- Aberaam Varma as Dr. Avinash
- Sri Lakshmi as Padmini
- Keshav Deepak as Dr. Misbah
- Vasu Inturi as Inspector Sivalingam
- Bindu Pagidimarri as Fatima
- Phanindra Gollapalli as House Owner
- John Kottoly as Unnamed henchman
- Rishikanth as Sagar
- Kaushik as Unknown victim
- Pradeep Yarlagadda as victim's father
- Sri Divya as victim's mother
- Master Harshit as Vicky
- Deepthi as Nurse
- Phanindra as Dr. Cheliyan

== Episodes ==
No.	Title	Directed by	Written by	Original release date
1	"The Loot of a Lifetime"	Pradeep Deva Kumar	Pradeep Deva Kumar	25 March 2020
2	"Hired Guns"	Pradeep Deva Kumar	Pradeep Deva Kumar	25 March 2020
3	"Parched"	Pradeep Deva Kumar	Pradeep Deva Kumar	27 March 2020
4	"Euphoric Mind"	Pradeep Deva Kumar	Pradeep Deva Kumar	27 March 2020
5	"The Deamons Calling"	Pradeep Deva Kumar	Pradeep Deva Kumar	27 March 2020
6	"A Mare's Nest"	Pradeep Deva Kumar	Pradeep Deva Kumar	27 March 2020
7	"Tabula Rasa"	Pradeep Deva Kumar	Pradeep Deva Kumar	27 March 2020

== Release ==
Along with the original version in Telugu, the series is also available in Hindi & Marathi language dubbed versions streaming on Ultra Play & Ultra Jhakaas app respectively.

== Reception ==
Locked opened to positive reviews from the critics. Neeshita Nyapathi of The Times of India rated the series 3 stars out of 5 and stated "Locked keeps you engrossed and is brave for a Telugu series." Nyapathi appreciated the performances, writing that "Satyadev shoulders the mini-series with his performance, making the switch to show off all the shades of his character with remarkable ease. Sri Lakshmi, Samyuktha, Keshav and Inturi too fare well."

India Today editor Janani K opined that the series is "intriguing in parts." Though she criticized the series for "tardy screenplay" and "logical loopholes," K opined that the it picks momentum in latter half. She termed the performances of Kancharana, Hornad, and Lakshmi as "top-notch" and felt that the series is strong on the technical front.

Prathysu Parasuraman of Film Companion also praised the performances but opined that the series lost its charm midway. A reviewer from Sakshi appreciated Locked for its narration, performances and technical aspects but was critical about some of its loopholes and dark tone.
