= 47 Days =

2020 Telugu film directed by Pradeep Maddali

- Release Poster
- Directed by: Pradeep Maddali
- Written by: Pradeep Maddali
- Produced by: Vijay Donkada; Raghu Kunche; Sridhar Makkuva; Dabbara Sashi Bhushan Naidu
- Starring: Satyadev; Pooja Jhaveri
- Cinematography: GK
- Edited by: M. S. Rajashekhar Reddy (S. R. Shekhar)
- Music by: Raghu Kunche
- Production company: Title Card Entertainment
- Distributed by: ZEE5
- Release date: 30 June 2020
- Country: India
- Language: Telugu

47 Days is a 2020 Indian Telugu-language mystery drama film written and directed by Pradeep Maddali. Produced by Title Card Entertainment, the film stars Satyadev and Pooja Jhaveri with music composed by Raghu Kunche.

The film began its production in 2018 which was delayed due to COVID-19 pandemic. 47 Days was digitally released on 30 June 2020 via ZEE5, and opened to mixed reviews.

== Plot ==
Satyadev is an ACP whose wife Paddu dies. While inspecting a case similar to the death of his wife, Satyadev becomes a part of a larger issue.

Amidst his grief, Satya stumbles upon the suicide of Srinivas, a pharmaceutical tycoon, which bears a link to his wife's death through a distinctive club stamp found on both their bodies. To uncover the truth, Satya begins an investigation that leads him to a woman named Juliet, who seems entangled in the mystery. The film explores his race against time to solve the case and uncover the hidden circumstances around his wife's death.

== Cast ==
- Satyadev as Satyadev
- Pooja Jhaveri as Juliet
- Roshini Prakash as Paddu
- Satya Prakash as Shafi
- Hari Teja as Zumba Trainer
- Ravi Varma as Ravi
- Srikanth Iyyengar as Raja Ram
- Irfan
- Baby Akshara as Swetcha
- Mukhtar Khan
- Kireeti Damaraju
- Ashok Kumar
- Appaji Ambarisha Darbha as Beach jogger

== Production ==
The film is directed by Pradeep Maddali, a former software engineer who worked as an assistant director under Puri Jagannadh. He met Satyadev on the sets of Rogue (2017). The film is based on a scene from his short film Juliet (2011) and began production in 2018. Satyadev was signed to play an ACP in the film. The makers of the film obtained the permission to use the name 47 Days after the 1981 film of the same name. The film was scheduled to release in theaters following Satyadev's Uma Maheswara Ugra Roopasya; however, the film released on ZEE5 on June 30, 2020, due to COVID-19 after much delay.

== Music ==
The songs were composed by Raghu Kunche. Puri Jagannadh released the song "Kya Karoon" on Valentines Day 2018, performed by Neeha Kadiveti with lyrics by Lakshmi Bhupala.

== Reception ==
47 Days received mixed reviews from critics with praise for performances and technical output but criticism for the storyline and narration. Neeshita Nyayapati of Times of India gave the film two stars out of five, saying "47 Days only works in bits and pieces because Satyadev does enough to ensure you stay invested." Sangeetha Devi Dundoo of The Hindu wrote that, "There’s a lot going on in the film written and directed by Pradeep Maddali, but it ends up as a hotchpotch. The only reason to watch it till the end is its leading man Satyadev, whose empathetic performance goes in vain."
