= 1983 (film) =

- Theatrical poster
- Directed by: Abrid Shine
- Screenplay by: Abrid Shine; Bipin Chandran
- Story by: Abrid Shine
- Produced by: T. R. Shamsudheen
- Starring: Nivin Pauly; Anoop Menon; Nikki Galrani; Srinda Arhaan
- Cinematography: Pradeesh M. Varma
- Edited by: Manoj
- Music by: Gopi Sunder
- Production company: Shams Films
- Distributed by: LJ Films (India) / PJ Entertainments & Tricolor Entertainments.
- Release date: 31 January 2014
- Country: India
- Language: Malayalam

1983 is a 2014 Indian Malayalam-language coming-of-age sports film directed by fashion photographer Abrid Shine (in his directorial debut) who wrote the story and co-wrote the script with Bipin Chandran. The film, produced under the banner of Shams Films, stars Nivin Pauly in the lead role. Anoop Menon, Nikki Galrani, Joy Mathew, Srinda Arhaan, Jacob Gregory, Saiju Kurup, Binoy Antony, Shine Tom Chacko, Dinesh, Sui Joseph, Neeraj Madhav and Sanju, make up the rest of the cast. Pradeesh Varma cranked the camera and the music director was Gopi Sunder, for which he received the 62nd National Film Awards for Best Background Score.

The film is a family drama that revolves around cricket. It centers on Rameshan (Nivin Pauly) and his memories from 1983 when India won its first World Cup under Kapil Dev. 1983, which is also a tribute to cricketer Sachin Tendulkar, was released on 31 January and was the first success film of 2014. All the songs composed by Gopi Sunder became popular and one of them, "Olanjali Kuruvi", was a chartbuster.

The film received three Kerala State Film Awards including Best Debut Director for Abride Shine, Best Actor for Nivin Pauly and Second Best Actor for Anoop Menon. It is widely regarded as one of the best movies during the Malayalam New Wave.

== Plot ==
In a remote village in Kerala named Brahmamangalam, the people have a passion for cricket. From India winning their first Cricket World Cup in 1983, to present times, the story follows the father-son relationship of two generations. As a teenager Rameshan is passionate about cricket and performs well in his academics. His father wants his son to become an engineer one day. Rameshan is in love with Manjula, who is studying in the same school. He is part of a local cricket team, formed by his close friends, and wins many local tournaments with his above par performance in batting. However, with time his academic results turn very poor and he even fails his 12th Board exams. Even if he fails in his academics, his love for the game remains the same and his father continues to protest against this. His love interest, Manjula, is very good at her studies and joins another college for higher education.

Rameshan joins his father in running an electrical workshop and lives a modest life. His love for game continues all this while. Eventually, he loses his lover who marries an Indian-American. A depressed Rameshan is encouraged by his friends and family to marry a girl from the same village. His wife, Susheela, is ignorant about cricket to such an extent that she doesn't know Sachin Tendulkar. Rameshan is blessed with his son, Kannan, who shows an interest in cricket at a very young age. Rameshan still plays cricket and starts coaching his son. Rameshan wants his son to become a cricketer. He takes his son to a former state cricket player Vijay Menon's sports academy. Rameshan faces many financial problems to support his son's coaching. His wife helps him against his mother's wishes. After some days unfortunately Vijay wants to go to Chennai, as he was called by his senior coach Chandrakant and he wants Vijay to be with him to take responsibility of his cricket coaching club. For a better future for Kannan, Vijay advises Rameshan to join the cricket academy of his friend. But Kannan could get the selection in order to join the academy. But he fails to get the selection as the ball strikes on the back tail and he gets injured.

Rameshan's father and son play a vital role in his life and eventually his father gives him his support to pursue his love for cricket. At the end, Rameshan, with the help of his father, makes a bowling machine to help his son play pace. After many ups and downs, and motivation from Vijay, Kannan gets selected for the Under-14 district team. Like how he loved the cricket now his son also loves cricket. The movie ends with Rameshan talking about wanting to see his son wearing India's jersey.

== Cast ==
- Nivin Pauly as Rameshan
- Anoop Menon as Vijay Menon, cricket coach
- Bhagath Abrid as Kannan, Son of Rameshan
- Srinda Arhaan as Susheela, wife of Rameshan
- Nikki Galrani as Manjula Sasidharan, ex-lover of Rameshan
- Joy Mathew as Gopi Aashaan, father of Rameshan
- Seema G. Nair as Rameshan's mother
- Binoy Antony as Basheer
- Saiju Kurup as Pappan
- Dinesh Prabhakar as Ambrose Saji
- Sanju Sivram as Babukuttan
- Neeraj Madhav as Prahaladan a.k.a. Vilakkoothi
- Kalabhavan Prajod as Mantle Jerry
- Jacob Gregory as Sachin (extended cameo)
- Joju George as David, cricket coach
- Nandhana Varma as Young Manjula Sasidharan
- Ambika Mohan as Manjula's Mother (cameo appearance)
- Arun as Manjula's Husband (cameo appearance)
- Valsala Menon
- Gokulan as Kuttan
- Sajan Palluruthy as commentator
- Jiya Irani as Minnal Freddy
- Priyanka as Beautician (cameo appearance)
- Chembil Ashokan as Tea Shop Owner (cameo appearance)

== Production ==
The film started its shoot in May 2013 in Ernakulam, produced by Shamsudheen under the banner of Shams films. The movie distribution was done by LJ Films, owned by director Lal Jose.

== Soundtrack ==
1983

Soundtrack album by Gopi Sunder
- Released: 2014
- Genre: Feature film soundtrack
- Language: Malayalam
- Label: Manorama Music
- Producer: Gopi Sunder

Gopi Sunder chronology
Salala Mobiles (2014)	1983 (2014)	Happy Journey (2014)

All lyrics are written by Santhosh Varma except where noted; all music is composed by Gopi Sundar.

No.	Title	Lyrics	Artist(s)	Length
1.	"Olanajali Kuruvi"	Hari Narayanan	P. Jayachandran, Vani Jairam	4:48
2.	"Thalavettam Kanumba"		Gopi Sundar, Nivas	3:20
3.	"Nenjile Nenjile"		Gopi Sundar, Aleetta Dennis	4:50
4.	"Olakkam Choodumaayi"		Nivas, Aleetta Dennis	4:52

== Reception ==
Entertainment site oneindia gave the film 3.5/5 stars and said "1983 is a thoroughly enjoyable entertainer which pleases your heart throughout. For almost all generations, it's a nostalgic revisit to those childhood memories, where you had played cricket with your friends, a tennis ball, wickets of stick, and a bat carved from leaf stalk".

IBTimes ranked Abrid Shine first in its list of the top 5 debutant Malayalam directors of 2014.

== Box office ==
It was one of the biggest commercial successes of 2014 in Malayalam.

== Awards and nominations ==
Award	Date of ceremony (Note: Date is linked to the article about the awards held that year, wherever possible.)	Category	Recipient(s)	Result	Ref.
Asianet Film Awards	11 January 2015	Best Character Actor	Anoop Menon	Won	
Asianet Film Awards	11 January 2015	Best New Face Award	Nikki Galrani	Won	
Asianet Film Awards	11 January 2015	Best Music Director	Gopi Sundar	Won	
Asiavision Awards	14 November 2014	Best Debut Director	Abrid Shine	Won	
Asiavision Awards	14 November 2014	Star of The Year – Male	Nivin Pauly	Won	
Asiavision Awards	14 November 2014	Best Music Director	Gopi Sundar	Won	
Asiavision Awards	14 November 2014	Best Playback Singer – Female	Vani Jairam ("Olanajali Kuruvi")	Won	
Filmfare Awards South	26 June 2015	Best Film – Malayalam	1983	Nominated	
Filmfare Awards South	26 June 2015	Best Director – Malayalam	Abrid Shine	Nominated	
Filmfare Awards South	26 June 2015	Best Actor – Malayalam	Nivin Pauly	Nominated	
Filmfare Awards South	26 June 2015	Critics Best Actor – Malayalam	Nivin Pauly	Won	
Filmfare Awards South	26 June 2015	Best Female Debut – Malayalam	Nikki Galrani	Won	
Filmfare Awards South	26 June 2015	Best Lyricist – Malayalam	B.K.Harinarayanan ("Olanajali Kuruvi")	Won	
Filmfare Awards South	26 June 2015	Best Female Playback Singer – Malayalam	Vani Jairam ("Olanajali Kuruvi")	Nominated	
Kerala State Film Awards	10 August 2015	Best Debut Director	Abrid Shine	Won	
Kerala State Film Awards	10 August 2015	Best Actor	Nivin Pauly	Won	
Kerala State Film Awards	10 August 2015	Best Character Role - Male	Anoop Menon	Won	
National Film Awards	3 May 2015	Best Music Direction (Background Score)	Gopi Sundar	Won	
South Indian International Movie Awards	6—7 August 2015	Best Debut Director – Malayalam	Abrid Shine	Won	
South Indian International Movie Awards	6—7 August 2015	Best Actor – Malayalam	Nivin Pauly	Won	
South Indian International Movie Awards	6—7 August 2015	Best Female Debut – Malayalam	Nikki Galrani	Won	
South Indian International Movie Awards	6—7 August 2015	Best Actress in a Supporting Role – Malayalam	Srinda Arhaan	Nominated	
South Indian International Movie Awards	6—7 August 2015	Best Lyricist – Malayalam	B.K.Harinarayanan ("Olanajali Kuruvi")	Won	
South Indian International Movie Awards	6—7 August 2015	Best Male Playback Singer – Malayalam	P. Jayachandran ("Olanajali Kuruvi")	Nominated	
Vanitha Film Awards	15 February 2015	Best Film	1983	Won	
Vanitha Film Awards	15 February 2015	Most Popular Actor	Nivin Pauly	Won	
Vanitha Film Awards	15 February 2015	Best Supporting Actress	Srinda Arhaan	Won	
Vanitha Film Awards	15 February 2015	Best Newcomer Actress	Nikki Galrani	Won	
Vanitha Film Awards	15 February 2015	Best Lyricist	B.K.Harinarayanan ("Olanajali Kuruvi")	Won	
