= Satyadev (actor) =

Indian actor (born 1988)

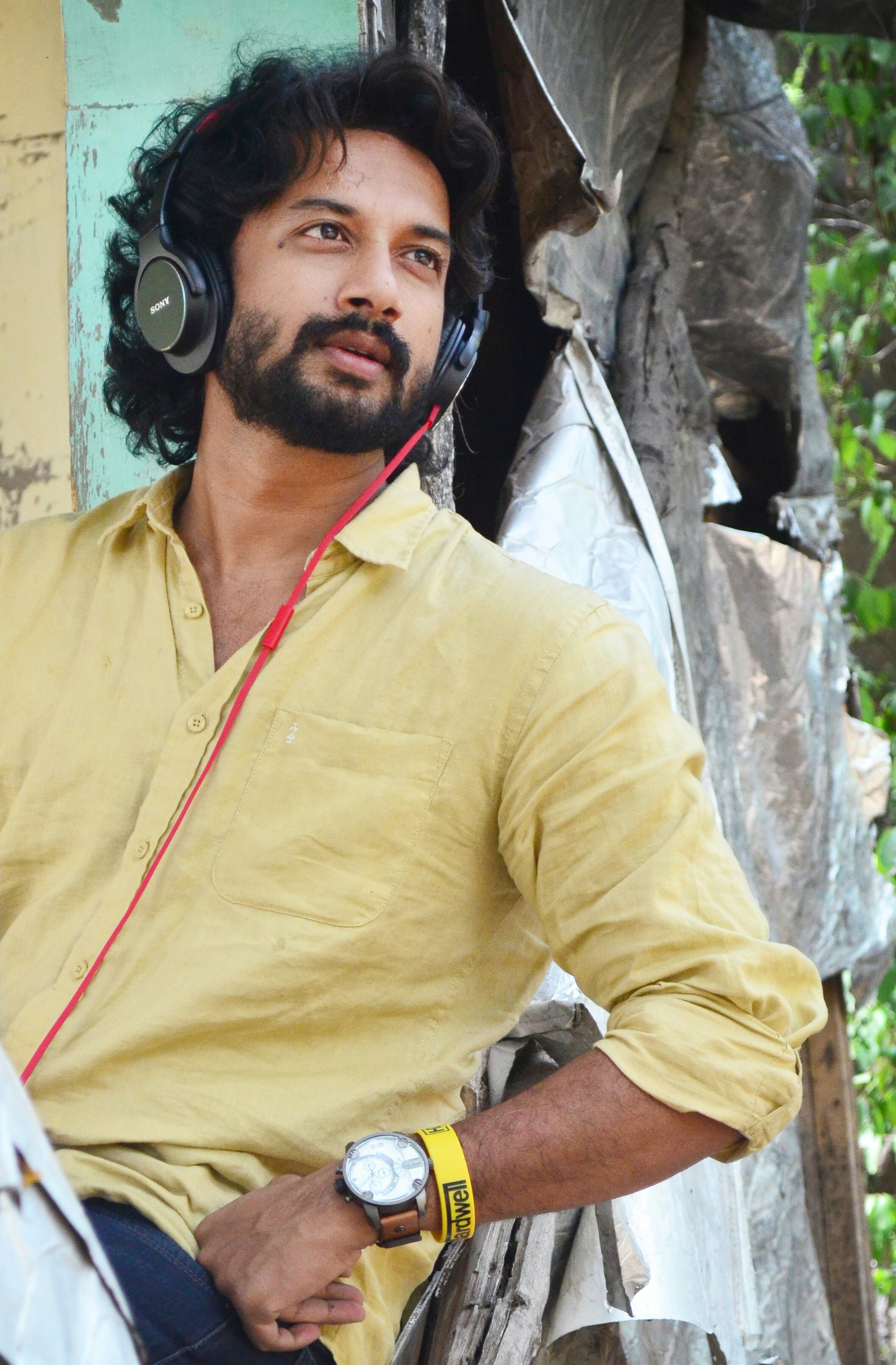
- Satyadev during a photoshoot
- Born: Satyadev Kancharana; 4 July 1988 (age 38); Visakhapatnam, Andhra Pradesh, India
- Other name: Satya Dev
- Education: MVGR College of Engineering
- Occupation: Actor
- Years active: 2011–present
- Spouse: Deepika
- Children: 1

Satyadev Kancharana (born 4 July 1988) is an Indian actor primarily working in Telugu cinema. He has received a SIIMA Award and two Filmfare Award South nominations.

Satyadev made his acting debut in a supporting role in Mr. Perfect (2011), and later took on supporting parts in Jyothi Lakshmi (2015), Kshanam (2016) and Ghazi (2017). He established himself as a leading actor with successful films including Bluff Master (2018), Brochevarevarura (2019), iSmart Shankar (2019) and Uma Maheswara Ugra Roopasya (2020).

== Early and personal life ==
Satyadev was born on 4 July 1988, in Visakhapatnam. He attended SFS School and Nalanda Talent School in Visakhapatnam, and graduated in Computer Science Engineering from MVGR College of Engineering, Vijayanagaram. Satyadev worked as a virtual design architect for IBM and VMware until 2016, when he quit to focus on his film career.

Satyadev is married to Deepika. The couple have a son named Savarnik, born in 2020.

== Career ==
=== Early work and success (2011–2019) ===
Satyadev started his career in 2011 with a minor role in Mr. Perfect. He continued playing minor roles in the 2013 films Seethamma Vakitlo Sirimalle Chettu and Attarintiki Daredi, and the 2014 film Mukunda. His first major role came in his other 2014 release Maine Pyar Kiya. Although the film received a limited response, Suresh Kavirayani of the Deccan Chronicle stated: "Another promising debutant is Satya Dev, who had to perform two characters—one young and the other, in the 40s. The variations in both characters are brought out superbly by Dev." In 2015, Satyadev was selected from over 500 artistes for the lead role in Jyothi Lakshmi. The film was a moderate success and provided him with recognition. That year, he also appeared in Asura, which was again a commercial success.

In 2016, Satyadev played a businessman in Kshanam (opposite Adah Sharma), an autorickshaw driver in Mana Oori Ramayanam, and made a cameo appearance in Appatlo Okadundevadu. All three films emerged as critical and commercial successes. Reviewing Mana Oori Ramayanam, Suhas Yellapantula called his performance "top notch". For Kshanam, Pranita Jonnalagedda stated that he gave his maximum to a "well-etched character". Satyadev started 2017 with the bilingual The Ghazi Attack, where he played a sonar operator. The film was a box office success and received positive response. Later that year, he played a constable in Rogue, which failed at the box office. In 2018, he first played dual roles in Antariksham 9000 KMPH. He then played a con man opposite Nandita Swetha in Bluff Master. A critic of 123telugu was appreciative of his screen presence.

Satyadev had further success with his four releases in 2019. He first played an assistant director in Brochevarevarura opposite Nivetha Pethuraj. The film was a major box office success and Palaparthi Srividya was appreciative of his "mature performance". He then played a CBI officer in another commercial success, iSmart Shankar opposite Nidhhi Agerwal. Hemanth Kumar of Firstpost noted, "Satyadev delivers another solid performance and his presence is felt till the end of the film." He next appeared in George Reddy. In his final release of the year, he played a fashion photographer and filmmaker opposite Eesha Rebba in Raagala 24 Gantallo. A critic for The Hindu noted that he "sparkle[d]" in his role. Satyadev then made his web series debut with Gods of Dharmapuri, playing a gangster. Hemanth Kumar CR stated that he delivers a "terrific" performance.

=== Critical acclaim and fluctuations (2020–present) ===
Satyadev started 2020 with the year's second highest-grossing film, Sarileru Neekevvaru, where he played an army officer. He then played a police officer opposite Pooja Jhaveri in 47 Days. Sangeetha Devi Dundoo noted, "The only reason to watch it till the end is Satyadev, whose empathetic performance goes in vain." Satyadev next appeared in his most critically acclaimed film, Uma Maheswara Ugra Roopasya, where he played a photographer. Haricharan Pudipeddi opined, "Satyadev, who is consistently good lately, is a solid match to Fahadh Faasil and even though you're reminded of the latter's mannerisms in a few scenes, he makes his character unique in his own way." Later the year, he played a mechanical engineer opposite Priyaa Lal in Guvva Gorinka, which opened to mixed reviews. Following this, he appeared as a neurosurgeon in the series Locked. Both the series and his performance received positive response.

In 2021, Satyadev first appeared as a writer in the anthology Pitta Kathalu. Following this, he played an advocate in Thimmarusu opposite Priyanka Jawalkar. Murali Krishna C H stated, "Satyadev is really in good form. He fits perfectly into the role and powers Thimmarusu to gloss over its uneven edges." Later he played a crook alongside Nithya Menen in Skylab. A critic of The News Minute found him to be "impressive". In the same year, he also featured in the music video "Daare Leda" alongside Roopa Kodavayur.

In his first film of 2022, Satyadev had a cameo in Acharya as a comrade. He then played a businessman turned rebel alongside Aishwarya Lekshmi in Godse, which was an average grosser. Paul Nicodemus noted that he "evokes the right emotions among the audience" with his act. In Godfather, he played an aspiring politician opposite Nayanthara. Despite the big budget, it was a box office failure. His performance earned him a nomination for the Filmfare Award for Best Supporting Actor – Telugu, and critic Sowmya Rajendran opined, "Satyadev is marvellous. As the manipulative Jai who wins Satya's trust easily, Satyadev gets a bigger role in the remake and does justice to it." Satyadev then expanded to Hindi films with Ram Setu, portraying Lord Hanuman in human disguise. The film was a box office failure. Abhimanyu Mathur of Hindustan Times stated, "Even though AP is written as a stereotypical Lankan with the clichéd accent, he brings through his performance enough charm and humour for the role to stand out." In his final film of the year, he played a software engineer opposite Tamannaah Bhatia in Gurthunda Seethakalam, which emerged as another box office failure. Consequently, Satyadev had no film releases in 2023.

The year 2024 began with Satyadev playing an orphan in Krishnamma. In a mixed review, a critic of Cinema Express was appreciative of his character's "raw vulnerability". In his next release, Satyadev played a bank employee opposite Priya Bhavani Shankar in Zebra. Srivathsan Nadadhur of The Hindu found him to be "sharp as ever" in a character with larger-than-life presence.

== Filmography ==
Key
†	Denotes films that have not yet been released

=== Films ===
- All films are in Telugu, unless otherwise noted.

Year	Title	Role	Notes	Ref.
2011	Mr. Perfect	Vicky's friend		
2013	Seethamma Vakitlo Sirimalle Chettu	Chinnodu's friend		
2013	Attarintiki Daredi	Prameela's kidnapper		
2014	Maine Pyar Kiya	Bharath		
2014	Mukunda	Chairman's henchman		
2015	Asura	Daya		
2015	Jyothi Lakshmi	Satya		
2015	Letter		Short film	
2016	Kshanam	Karthik		
2016	Mana Oori Ramayanam	Shiva		
2016	Appatlo Okadundevadu	Praneeth Kumar / Tester	Cameo appearance	
2017	Ghazi	Rajeev Thakur	Simultaneously shot in Hindi as The Ghazi Attack	
2017	Rogue	Constable Murali	Simultaneously shot in Kannada	
2018	Antariksham 9000 KMPH	Karan / Aditya		
2018	Bluff Master	Uttam Kumar	Also playback singer for "What the Beep"	
2019	Brochevarevarura	Vishal		
2019	iSmart Shankar	Arun		
2019	George Reddy	Satya		
2019	Raagala 24 Gantallo	Rahul		
2020	Sarileru Neekevvaru	Captain Ajay		
2020	47 Days	Satyadev		
2020	Uma Maheswara Ugra Roopasya	Uma Maheswara "Mahesh" Rao		
2020	Guvva Gorinka	Sadanand / Silencer		
2021	Pitta Kathalu	Vivek	Segment: "Pinky"	
2021	Thimmarusu	Advocate Ramachandra "Ram"		
2021	Skylab	Dr. Anand		
2022	Acharya	Comrade Shankar	Cameo appearance	
2022	Godse	Viswanath Ramachandra / Nathuram Godse		
2022	Godfather	Jaidev Das		
2022	Ram Setu	Anjaneyan Pushpakumaran "AP"	Hindi film	
2022	Gurthunda Seethakalam	Satyadev "Dev"		
2024	Krishnamma	Bhadra		
2024	Zebra	Surya Kancharana		
2025	Kingdom	Siva		
2025	Drive	John	Cameo appearance	
2026	Rao Bahadur	Bhuvanam Ramappa Rao Bahadur		
TBA	Samavarthi †	Mahadev		

=== Television ===
Year	Title	Role	Network	Ref.
2019	Gods of Dharmapuri	Venu Reddy	ZEE5	
2020	Locked	Anand Chakravarthy	Aha	
2025	Arabia Kadali	Nuragala Badiri	Amazon Prime Video	

=== Music video ===
Year	Title	Singer	Ref.
2021	"Daare Leda"	Roshan Sebastian	

=== As voice actor ===
Year	Title	Role	Actor	Notes	Ref.
2018	Nawaab	Ethirajan "Ethi" Senapathi	Silambarasan	Telugu dubbed version	
2019	Saaho	Jai / Ashok Chakravarthy	Neil Nitin Mukesh		
2020	Aakaasam Nee Haddhu Ra	Nedumaaran Rajangam "Maara"	Suriya	Telugu dubbed version	
2024	Mufasa: The Lion King	Taka	Kelvin Harrison Jr.	Telugu dubbed version	

== Awards and nominations ==
Year	Award	Category	Work	Result	Ref.
2021	9th South Indian International Movie Awards	Best Actor – Telugu	Uma Maheswara Ugra Roopasya	Nominated	
2023	11th South Indian International Movie Awards	Best Actor in a Negative Role – Telugu	Godfather	Nominated	
2024	68th Filmfare Awards South	Best Supporting Actor – Telugu	Godfather	Nominated	
2026	14th South Indian International Movie Awards	Best Supporting Actor – Telugu	Kingdom	Won	
