= Acharya (2022 film) =

2022 film directed by Koratala Siva

- Theatrical release poster
- Directed by: Koratala Siva
- Written by: Koratala Siva
- Produced by: Niranjan Reddy; Anvesh Reddy
- Starring: Chiranjeevi; Ram Charan; Pooja Hegde; Sonu Sood; Jisshu Sengupta
- Cinematography: Tirru
- Edited by: Naveen Nooli
- Music by: Mani Sharma
- Production companies: Konidela Production Company; Matinee Entertainment
- Release date: 29 April 2022
- Running time: 154 minutes
- Country: India
- Language: Telugu
- Budget: ₹140 crore

Acharya (transl. Teacher) is a 2022 Indian Telugu-language action film written and directed by Koratala Siva. Produced by Konidela Production Company and Matinee Entertainment, the film stars Chiranjeevi as the titular character alongside Ram Charan, Pooja Hegde, Sonu Sood, and Jisshu Sengupta in supporting roles. The music was composed by Mani Sharma, cinematography by Tirru, and editing by Naveen Nooli.

The film was launched in October 2019. Principal photography began in January 2020 and suffered delays due to the COVID-19 pandemic. Acharya was released theatrically on 29 April 2022 and opened to highly negative reviews, criticizing the story, outdated screenplay, VFX, weak direction, and editing, but praising the performances of Chiranjeevi and Ram Charan. It was a Box-office bomb, grossing ₹78 crore against a budget of ₹140 crore.

== Plot ==
Dharmasthali and the adjoining hamlet of Padaghattam are Temple towns which are surrounded by the Siddhavanam forest. The two towns are interlinked by their values and faith to the goddess Gattamma. Dharmasthali operates under the tyrannical rule of Basava, the local municipal chairman who intends to give the lands of Dharmasthali and Padaghattam to Rathod and his brother Vikram for mining purposes. The people of Padaghattam, who are known for their expertise in Ayurvedic medicine, start visiting Dharmasthali less frequently due to Basava's cruel regime. Acharya, a naxal, arrives in Dharmasthali in the guise of a carpenter. He starts retaliating for the atrocities committed by Basava to the villagers. It is revealed that Acharya came to Dharmasthali to fulfill his best friend Siddha's promise. He reveals about Siddha's past and origin to Dharmasthali villagers.

Past: Siddha is a disciple of the local Gurukul and a strong advocate for Dharma. Apart from him, Basava and the other men of the village study with him in the Gurukul. Basava hatches a plan with Vikram and his friend to destroy the village's Gattamma Temple, under the guise of flooding from torrential rain to start mining. Siddha discovers Basava's plan and attacks the trio on the night they plan to destroy the temple. He is gravely injured in the ensuing chaos. Acharya's squad arrives to his rescue and takes him away to the nearby Siddhavanam forest and heals him. Siddha wakes up, and Acharya's comrade Bose reveals his origins. Siddha was born to Comrade Shankar, Acharya's naxal squadron leader. In a shootout with the local law enforcement, Siddha's parents are both killed. Before dying, Shankar makes a young Acharya promise to raise Siddha with awareness about their fight for Dharma. To protect him, Acharya hands the newborn Siddha over to Adanna to be brought up in Dharmasthali. However, Acharya watches and protects Siddha from afar as he grows up. Siddha learns of his origins and is willingly initiated into Acharya's naxal squad. During a mission in rescuing the children of Adivasis who were forcibly taken away by Rathod's men for child labor in his mines, Siddha comes across a map of lands to be blasted for mining purposes, which includes the lands around Padaghattam and Dharmasthali. When Siddha goes back to his village to stop the mining, he comes across Rathod's henchmen heading to kill Acharya's squad. While trying to finish them with Acharya, Siddha is shot and killed by Rathod's henchman Khilla. Before dying, Acharya promises to Siddha that he will protect the village and stop the illegal mining planned by Basava and Rathod.

Present: After the reveal of Siddha's past, Acharya is arrested by the local police, while Basava and Rathod hatch a plan to wipe out the entire village during Gattamma's festival. Meanwhile, Acharya's squad manages to break him out of the police convoy while he is being taken away. He then kills each and every one of Rathod's henchmen, including Vikram and Khilla before killing both Rathod and Basava, thus avenging Siddha's death. After coming to terms with Siddha's demise, Acharya bids his farewell to Padaghattam and Dharmasthali and goes back to the forest with his squad to continue Siddha's legacy of upholding Dharma and their fight.

== Cast ==
- Chiranjeevi as Comrade Acharya
- Ram Charan as Comrade Siddha
- Pooja Hegde as Neelambari
- Sonu Sood as Basava, (voice dubbed by P. Ravi Shankar)
- Jisshu Sengupta as Rathod, (voice dubbed by Vedala Hemachandra)
- Saurav Lokesh as Vikram, Rathod's brother
- Kishore as Basava's aide
- Nassar as Adanna
- Ajay as Vedanna
- Tanikella Bharani as Priest
- Vennela Kishore as Acharya's disciple
- Banerjee as Comrade Bose
- Shatru as Khilla
- Raghu Babu as Drug Supplier (Basava's henchman)
- Raja Ravindra as Basava's henchman
- Ravi Prakash as Comrade Sivudu
- Pawan as Obulu, Basava's henchman
- C. V. L. Narasimha Rao
- Ravi Kale
- Chammak Chandra
- Getup Srinu
- Josh Ravi
- Sanjay Raichur
- Satyadev as Comrade Shankar, Siddha's late father
- Sangeetha Krish as a dancer in the song "Laahe Laahe"
- Regena Cassandrra as Mandakini, a bar dancer in the item song "Saana Kastam"
- Mahesh Babu as Narrator (voice - over)

== Production ==
=== Development ===
The film was launched on 8 October 2019 with the working title of Mega152 on Vijayadashami festival, being the first collaboration of Koratala Siva and Chiranjeevi. Chiranjeevi accidentally revealed the title as Acharya during audio launch of the film O Pitta Katha in March 2020.

Mani Sharma is the music composer. Cinematography and editing is performed respectively by Tirru and Naveen Nooli. Suresh Selvarajan is the art director.

In January 2022, Asianet News reported that the film's storyline is based on the Naxalite movement in Srikakulam district, led by poet and cultural activist Subbarao Panigrahi.

=== Casting ===
Trisha was cast as the lead but exited later, citing creative differences, and eventually was replaced by Kajal Aggarwal. Reportedly, Mahesh Babu was offered the cameo role in the film. However, Chiranjeevi later confirmed his son Ram Charan for the role; Koratala adjusted the role to make it full-fledged. In an interview with Variety, Charan who plays Sidhha, said “It’s a 40-minute role, it’s pretty much the whole of the second half."

Pooja Hegde was cast as Neelambari opposite Charan, has an extended cameo. Regina Cassandra was signed for a special song in March 2020. Mahesh Babu has given narration for this film.

=== Filming ===
Principal photography began in January 2020. Important portions were shot with Chiranjeevi and others at Ramoji Film City. The filming was going at a brisk pace until suspension in March 2020 due to COVID-19 pandemic. Filming was resumed in November 2020, and Aggarwal joined the sets in December 2020 in Hyderabad. A temple town set spanning 20 acres was built for the film.

Charan joined the production in January 2021. The film team reached Rajahmundry the same month. In March 2021, Pooja Hegde shot her portions with a montage song at a specially-constructed set in Maredumilli. A schedule took place at Singareni coal mines, Yellandu later that month. Owing to the second wave of COVID-19 pandemic, the filming was paused again and later resumed in July 2021 at a village set in Hyderabad. Both Ram Charan and Chiranjeevi resumed shooting their portions that month. Except for two songs, the rest of shoot was finished in August 2021.

Following her pregnancy in September 2021, Aggarwal requested the makers to complete her portions at the earliest. It is reported she subsequently opted out of the project owing to the delays in shoot and has not re-joined the production since. However, in April 2022, Koratala stated that Aggarwal's scenes were cut from the final draft of the film as he felt that the role she played could not match her stature.

=== Legal issues ===
In August 2020, writer Rajesh Manduri alleged that Acharya was plagiarized from his script. He supposedly narrated the story to production house Mythri Movie Makers a few years ago which did not materialize. Mythri Movie Makers refuted the allegation, calling it a "gimmick." Matinee Entertainment stated that any such claims were baseless, iterating that the story of Acharya belongs to Koratala. Koratala responded that his story had no resemblance to Manduri's.

== Music ==
Acharya

Soundtrack album by Mani Sharma
- Released: 20 May 2022
- Recorded: 2020–2021
- Genre: Feature film soundtrack
- Length: 24:10
- Language: Telugu
- Label: Aditya Music
- Producer: Mani Sharma

Mani Sharma chronology
Republic (2021)	Acharya (2022)	Shaakuntalam (2022)

Singles from Acharya
- 1. "Laahe Laahe" Released: 31 March 2021; 2. "Neelambari" Released: 5 November 2021; 3. "Saana Kastam" Released: 3 January 2022; 4. "Bhale Bhale Banjara" Released: 18 April 2022

The film's soundtrack album is composed by Mani Sharma in his eleventh collaboration with Chiranjeevi, third with Charan, and first with Koratala.

Track listing
No.	Title	Lyrics	Singer(s)	Length
1.	"Laahe Laahe"	Ramajogayya Sastry	Harika Narayan, Sahithi Chaganti	4:07
2.	"Neelambari"	Ananta Sriram	Anurag Kulkarni, Ramya Behara	4:14
3.	"Saana Kastam"	Bhaskarabhatla	Revanth, Geetha Madhuri	4:04
4.	"Bhale Bhale Banjara"	Ramajogayya Sastry	Shankar Mahadevan, Rahul Sipligunj	4:19
5.	"Putuka Thone"	Ramajogayya Sastry	Anurag Kulkarni	4:03
6.	"Acharya Slokam"	Kalyan Chakravarthy	M.L. Sruthi	3:20
Total length:				24:10

== Release ==
=== Theatrical ===
Acharya was released theatrically on 29 April 2022. Earlier, it was scheduled to release on 13 May 2021, but was pushed back due to production delays and the COVID-19 pandemic in India. In October 2021, it was announced that the film would release 4 February 2022. In January 2022, it was then pushed to 1 April 2022 due to the increasing number of COVID-19 cases, fuelled by the SARS-CoV-2 Omicron variant. Later that month, it was pushed back to 29 April 2022 in order to avoid a clash with Charan's other film RRR.

=== Home media ===
The satellite rights were acquired by Gemini TV while the digital distribution rights were acquired by Amazon Prime Video. The film premiered on Amazon Prime Video on 20 May 2022 in Telugu along with dubbed versions in Tamil, Malayalam and Kannada languages. Meanwhile, the Hindi version was later released on ZEE5.

== Reception ==
=== Box office ===
On its opening day, Acharya grossed ₹52 crore worldwide with a distributor's share of ₹35 crore. In three days, the film grossed ₹70.35 crore, taking its distributor's share to ₹45 crore. By the end of its theatrical run, the film collected ₹76 crore gross worldwide with a distributor's share of ₹48.36 crore. News18 Telugu estimated that the losses of the film amount to ₹84.14 crore from its theatrical business, making it a commercial failure.

=== Critical response ===
Acharya received negative reviews from critics, with strong criticism for the story, outdated screenplay, VFX, weak direction, and editing but praise for the lead cast's performances.

Neeshita Nyayapati of The Times of India gave the film a rating of 2.5/5 and wrote "Acharya lacks the soul it needed to pull off a tale that banks too much on people connecting to the concept of dharma". Janani K of India Today gave the film a rating of 2.5/5 and wrote "Acharya is an outdated story that talks about dharma, illegal mining and the importance of our roots. The father-son duo tried their best to keep things interesting". A reviewer from The Hans India gave the film a rating of 2.25/5 and wrote "‘Acharya’ movie is an outdated story and is further ruined by an unimpressive narration from Koratala Siva".

Medabayani Balakrishna of News 18 gave the film a rating of 1.5/5 and wrote "The sloppy play with the routine scenes, the boring treatment and the weak sequences are the minus points for this movie. Manoj Kumar R of The Indian Express gave the film a rating of 1/5 and wrote "The writing is so poor that even the two actors' massive stardom feels inadequate to lift this movie. It's a snooze fest". Sangeetha Devi Dundoo of The Hindu stated "The playoffs between Chiranjeevi and Ram Charan are endearing, but the film is utterly boring". Sowmya Rajendran of The News Minute gave the film a rating of 1/5 and wrote "It is puzzling how director Koratala Siva managed to achieve this casting coup with such a tedious storyline".
