= Skylab (film) =

2021 film by Vishvak Khanderao

- Theatrical release poster
- Directed by: Vishvak Khanderao
- Written by: Vishvak Khanderao
- Produced by: Prithvi Pinnamaraju; Nithya Menen
- Starring: Nithya Menen; Satyadev; Rahul Ramakrishna
- Cinematography: Aditya Javvadi
- Edited by: Ravi Teja Girijala
- Music by: Prashanth R Vihari
- Production companies: Byte Features; Nithya Menen Company
- Distributed by: Niravana Cinemas (overseas)
- Release date: 4 December 2021
- Running time: 148 minutes
- Country: India
- Language: Telugu

Skylab is a 2021 Indian Telugu-language period comedy drama film written and directed by debutant Vishvak Khanderao. Produced by Byte Features in association with Nithya Menen Company, the film stars Nithya Menen, Satyadev and Rahul Ramakrishna. The plot follows fictitious incidents in a Telangana village preceding the disintegration of the American space station Skylab in 1979. The film traces the fear looming among the villagers in a comical manner in light of these developments.

Skylab was released theatrically on 4 December 2021.

== Plot ==
The film is set in 1979, in the remote village of Bandalingampalli in United Andhra Pradesh (now Telangana). This is also the time when a US-based Skylab satellite fails and its debris is all set to fall to Earth. Information about the satellite's fall is communicated to scientists in India.

Dr. Anand and Subedar Ramarao become friends over the bus journey to Bandalingampalli. Gowri returns from Hyderabad after learning about her father's illness. Because her car broke down, she travels on the same bus as Anand and Ramarao. On reaching the village, Gowri learns that her father is well and that her mother, along with the servant, had sent false information. Disappointed with the return from the city, she decides to write and post it. Gowri's mother and Seenu decide not to tell Gowri about the newspaper dismissal.

Meanwhile, Anand wants to earn Rs.5000 to re-establish his lost medical license. He decides to team with Ramarao to open the clinic, which has been shut for 25 years. Ramarao's family has a lot of debt, and they are against doing menial jobs. Ramarao decides to pawn another of the family's antique jewellery to restart the clinic. Despite the village panchayat asking him not to reopen the clinic, the duo decides to turn it into a major village event. Gowri starts looking into how she can get her big story published.

The possibility of Skylab falling in India is announced over the radio, and villagers begin talking about it. The clinic opens to fanfare, and the announcement is made. The villagers decide to close the clinic and demand that Anand and Ramarao pay a fine. Gowri, meanwhile, starts scaring the villagers about the real possibility of Skylab falling on the village. Immediately, the Panchayat chief falls, and Anand is called for medication. He tells the villagers that the chief needs to be cared for at the clinic, and they all agree to reopen it.

Over 40 days, everyone begins to worry about the real possibility of Skylab crashing in the village and looks for alternative places to seek protection. Gowri gets an idea from her school teacher to write a story about village life, and it is published. Anand, who had wanted to leave the village after his grandfather paid the fee to obtain his final license, decides against it. Anand and Ramarao successfully help with a childbirth and the entire village is content. Given the circumstances of the D-day, the untouchables enter the temple, the maids and servants use their owner's goods, and everyone attempts to fulfil their wishes. They eventually learn over the radio that Skylab has fallen into the Indian Ocean, and everyone is elated.

== Cast ==
- Nithya Menen as Gowri
- Satyadev as Dr. Anand
- Rahul Ramakrishna as Subedar Ramarao
- Tanikella Bharani as Sadashivam, Anand's grandfather
- Vishnu Oi as Seenu
- G. V. Narayana Rao as Venkataraju, Gowri's father
- Tulasi as Padma, Gowri's mother
- Subbaraya Sharma as Sudarshan Rao, Telugu schoolmaster
- Tharun Bhascker as a scientist (Cameo)

== Production ==
Debutant writer-director Vishvak Khanderao wrote Skylab from the stories he heard in his village in Karimnagar district of Telangana about the crashing American space station Skylab in 1979. In an interview with The Hindu, Khanderao talked about the storyline. "The main characters are eccentric and the story not only explores what happens when the news of Skylab’s crash breaks out, but also the human psyche. The comedy is situational and in sync with the characters," he added.

Nithya Menen, Satyadev and Rahul Ramakrishna play the principal characters of Skylab. The film also marked Menen's maiden production venture. She also spoke in Telangana dialect for the first time in the film. Skylab began its production in March 2020 but was halted after a day of shoot due to the COVID-19 pandemic and resumed later. The film was released on 4 December 2021.

== Reception ==
Writing for The Hindu, Sangeetha Devi Dundoo called the film "a charming tale of a peculiar village." Dundoo appreciated the performances, stating, "Nithya is credible as the aristocrat who yearns for her identity but hasn’t yet worked enough for it and Satya Dev looks every bit the opportunist who later has a change of heart and has a homecoming of sorts." Rating 3 stars of 5, Thadagadh Pathi of The Times of India wrote, "This is a rare film where there’s no such thing as a ‘lead’ because it’s the story that’s the hero of the tale. Director Vishvak Kanderao truly pours life into the character inhabiting this world, aided by heart-touching dialogues."

Appreciating the storyline and performances, The News Minute critic Balakrishna Ganeshan said, "While Skylab is largely fun, sans violence, and a well-intentioned film, some of the scenes are inorganic." In his review for Cinema Express, Ram Venkat Srikar praised the technical values of the film, writing, "Prashanth R Vihari’s lovely score wonderfully captures the varying moods without overselling the emotion. Ravi Teja Girijala’s editing finds simple yet inventive methods to exalt simple scenes and montages. Aditya Javvadi’s camera and lighting are in a duet throughout, and yet the frames never come across as flashy."

Anji Shetty of Sakshi appreciated Khanderao for picking a novel storyline but opined that he couldn't translate the humour and narration well onto the screen. A reviewer from Eenadu also felt the same, saying that the film's pacing could have been better.
