= Aasha (2026 film) =

- Theatrical release poster
- Directed by: Safar Sanal
- Written by: Joju George; Ramesh Girija; Safar Sanal
- Produced by: Vinayaka Ajith
- Starring: Urvashi; Aishwarya Lekshmi; Joju George
- Cinematography: Madhu Neelakandan
- Edited by: Shan Mohammed
- Music by: Midhun Mukundan; Govind Vasantha
- Production company: Ajith Vinayaka Films
- Distributed by: Phars Film
- Release date: 11 September 2026
- Running time: 127 minute
- Country: India
- Language: Malayalam

Aasha is a 2026 Indian Malayalam-language psychological thriller film directed by Safar Sanal and produced by Vinayaka Ajith. It stars Urvashi, Joju George, Aishwarya Lekshmi, Vijayaraghavan, Joy Mathew in lead roles.

The film was theatrically released on 11 September 2026. Premiered on ZEE5 on October 16, 2026.

== Plot ==
Aasha is a widowed, middle-aged woman who runs a plant nursery and lives with her younger daughter, Anagha, while her elder daughter resides in Dubai. Hardened by a history of domestic abuse from her late husband, Aasha exhibits a volatile and unyielding temperament. Although her widower neighbor, Santhosh, harbors feelings for her, she postpones any thoughts of companionship until her Anagha is settled. Aasha strongly disapproves of Anagha's unemployed boyfriend, Sreejith, and actively arranges for prospective grooms to visit their home.

One night, while driving home from a movie, Aasha swerves abruptly to avoid a pothole. Consequently, a pickup truck trailing behind them—driven by a plumbing worker named Jeemon alongside his colleague, Asif veers off the road and crashes into a tree to avoid a collision. Enraged by the vehicular damage and Asif's minor head injury, Jeemon confronts Aasha and confiscates her car keys. Refusing to acknowledge her fault, Aasha escalates the altercation. When locals intervene and notice that Jeemon has been drinking, Aasha fabricates a narrative, accusing the men of drunkenly stalking and harassing them.

Despite the police and Anagha's advising a compromise, Aasha files a formal complaint, resulting in the police physically abusing and humiliating Jeemon. The following day, acting on instructions from his employer, Jose, to resolve the matter amicably, Jeemon approaches Aasha to apologize and request the withdrawal of the case, warning her that prolonged animosity will only breed trouble. Aasha, however, remains defiant. Soon after, Anagha deliberately arrives late to sabotage a matchmaking visit, sparking a heated argument with Aasha before storming out of the house late at night.

Hours later, Aasha learns that Anagha has been hospitalized following a severe road accident. Reviewing the hospital's CCTV footage, Aasha discovers that Jeemon and Asif were the ones who brought unconscious Anagha to the emergency ward before departing. Consumed by paranoia, Aasha suspects the duo orchestrated the accident in retaliation and sexually assaulted incapacitated Anagha. At Aasha's insistence, the doctor conducts a medical examination, which confirms recent sexual activity. Convinced that Jeemon and Asif raped Anagha, Aasha resolves to exact vengeance.

Obtaining Jeemon's contact details through Jose, Aasha lures Jeemon and Asif to an adjacent house she is renovating under the pretext of urgent plumbing repairs, leaving poisoned food on the dining table. While Jeemon steps outside to take a phone call, Asif consumes the laced food and collapses, vomiting blood. When Jeemon rushes back inside, Aasha ambushes him from behind with a shovel, knocking him unconscious. After binding both men in a storage room, she cleans the crime scene, disposes of their phones in a river, and returns to the hospital upon hearing that Anagha has regained consciousness.

At the hospital, Aasha attempts to administer an emergency contraceptive pill to Anagha, prompting a confrontation. To Aasha's horror, Anagha reveals that the sexual encounter was consensual with Sreejith earlier that evening. Furthermore, when her scooter had broken down at night, Jeemon and Asif had merely stopped to help her restart it and politely asked her to mediate with her mother regarding the police case; panicked by their presence, she had sped off into the path of an oncoming truck, after which the duo rescued her.

Realizing she has attacked innocent men, a guilt-ridden Aasha rushes back to the house, only to find that Asif has succumbed to the poison. Under the cover of night, she disposes of Asif's corpse in a backyard drainage pit and seals the concrete slab with cement to mask the decomposing stench. Terrified of legal repercussions and the ruin of her daughters' lives, Aasha keeps the surviving Jeemon captive while nursing his injuries and hides his material-laden work truck at a scrapyard. Meanwhile, a humbled Aasha finally gives her blessing to Sreejith, who has newly secured a position as a guest lecturer.

As days pass, Jose reports the disappearance of his workers and the truck to the police, who begin investigating Aasha after tracing her phone calls to Jeemon. In captivity, Jeemon confesses that he and Asif are orphans with no family searching for them, and he pleads for a second chance at life, promising never to expose her crimes.

With her elder daughter preparing to visit from Dubai and the police investigation closing in, Aasha decides to release Jeemon. She retrieves his truck from the scrapyard, parks it outside, and cuts his restraints. Jeemon remarks that her own conscience will be her ultimate punishment and prepares to leave peacefully. However, overcome with remorse, Aasha weeps and confesses that out of fear for her daughters' future, she had laced his final meal with poison, begging him to rush to the hospital to save himself. Betrayed and furious, Jeemon momentarily chokes her before fleeing in his truck toward the hospital. While driving down the highway, the poison takes effect; Jeemon dies at the wheel, causing the truck to veer off the road and crash into a ditch. His death is ultimately ruled an accident following a suspected theft, leaving Aasha's crimes undetected as she breaks down in agonizing guilt.

== Cast ==
- Urvashi as Aasha
- Joju George as Jeemon
- Aishwarya Lekshmi as Anakha, Aasha's younger daughter
- Vijayaraghavan as Santhosh, Aasha's neighbour
- Ajayan Adat as Sreejith, Anakha's love interest
- Ramesh Girija as Asif, Jeemon's friend and coworker
- Lakshmi Menon as Anitha, Aasha's elder daughter
- Joy Mathew as Varkey, Aasha's neighbour
- Alexander Prasanth as Sabu, Aasha's brother
- Prasanth Madhavan as SI Manoj Kurian
- Kottayam Ramesh as Kuri Jose
- Shari as Geetha, Aasha's friend (cameo appearance)
- Bhagyalakshmi as a person in the bank (cameo appearance)

== Production ==
=== Casting ===
Urvashi played the titular role, while Joju George played as Jeemon, while Aishwarya Lekshmi played the role of Anagha.

=== Marketing ===
A trailer of the film was released on 8 September 2026.

== Release ==
The film was released in theaters on 11 September 2026.

Home Media

The film premiered on ZEE5 on October 16, 2026.

== Critical reception ==
S.R. Praveen for The Hindu observed "The primary conflict in the film is also on weak footing. Aasha’s drastic actions arise from certain assumptions about a situation, but it does not turn out to be a surprise for the audience when she finally realises the big picture." Anandu Suresh for The Indian Express rated the movie 3/5 stars and noted "Aasha could have been a brilliant character study; however, the creators’ overt obsession with Urvashi’s acting potential also affects the movie, as the script sometimes fails to flesh out what it should have to make the movie better."

Aiswarya S Nair for The Times of India rated the movie 3.5/5 stars and observed "The film does have loopholes in its plot, and some turns may not feel completely convincing." Princy Alexander for Onmanorama opined "The film’s central idea, however, is stronger than its execution. The screenplay does manage to unravel several layers of the story, but there are times when it struggles to give the developments that follow enough weight and credibility."

Sajin Shrijith of The Week opined "The film successfully plants the seed of a certain idea in our minds, and it's easy to fall for it because that has been, traditionally, the path that most filmmakers take when writing thrillers involving two individuals." Vivek Santhosh for The New Indian Express wrote "Although the film slows down a bit in the second half, its surprising character developments and compelling central conflict keep it engaging. It's not simply a tale of good and evil; rather, it explores how both can exist in the same person."
