= Killadi Raman =

2011 film by Thulasidas

- Directed by: Thulasidas
- Story by: Rajan Kiriyath; V R Gopalakrishnan
- Produced by: Francis Antony; Joseph Cherian
- Starring: Mukesh; Siddique; Guinness Pakru; Lalu Alex; Jagathy Sreekumar; Jaffar Idukki
- Cinematography: Anandakuttan
- Music by: M. Jayachandran
- Production company: Far East Creations International
- Distributed by: Far East Creations International
- Release date: 9 December 2011
- Country: India
- Language: Malayalam

Killadi Raman is a 2011 Malayalam film directed by Thulasidas, starring Mukesh, Siddique Guinness Pakru, Lalu Alex, Jagathy Sreekumar and Jaffar Idukki in the lead roles. The film was released on 9 December 2011 alongside Happy Durbar, another Mukesh starrer.

== Plot ==
Killadi Raman is about the vagaries and paradoxes of life. Mahadevan's life takes a turn when he witnesses an accident, where Radhika has been hit by a vehicle. He takes her to a hospital but it only lands him in more trouble, when Meera, Radhika's friend, approaches him.

== Cast ==
- Mukesh as Mahadevan
- Siddique as Chandru
- Meghna Nair as Meera
- Priya Lal as Radhika
- Lena as Seethalakshmi
- Flemin Francis
- Lalu Alex as Prabhakaran Thampi
- Jagathy Sreekumar as Kuriakose
- Guinness Pakru as Bada Bhai
- Jaffar Idukki as Manikandan
- Kochu Preman as Abdul Gafoor
- Narayanankutty
- Sreelatha Namboothiri
- Rani Maria
