= Godse (film) =

2022 film by Gopi Ganesh

- Theatrical release poster
- Directed by: Gopiganesh Pattabhi
- Written by: Gopiganesh Pattabhi
- Produced by: C. Kalyan
- Starring: Satyadev; Aishwarya Lekshmi
- Cinematography: Suresh Sarangam
- Edited by: Sagar Udagandla
- Music by: Sandy Addanki
- Production company: CK Screens
- Release date: 17 June 2022
- Country: India
- Language: Telugu

Godse is a 2022 Indian Telugu-language vigilante action thriller film written and directed by Gopiganesh Pattabhi and produced by C. Kalyan under the banner of CK Screens. The film stars Satyadev and Aishwarya Lekshmi (in her Telugu debut). The film is a remake of the 2018 Korean film The Negotiation and the Spanish crime-thriller series Money Heist. Godse released on 17 June 2022 to mixed reviews from the critics.

== Plot ==
Vaishali, a hostage negotiator, fails to save a pregnant woman during a robbery in which one robber is killed while the other slits the woman's throat and escapes. 63 days later, she is assigned to negotiate with a mysterious person named "Nathuram Godse", who kidnaps several high-profile businessmen and SP Sameer. Vaishali speaks with Godse, while the police surround his base in a secret island. Godse tells Vaishali to bring Industrial Minister Phani Kumar. After answering many questions, Phani Kumar reveals the existence of shell companies, which are nonexistent and only printed on newspaper. They can be used to commit fraud against jobless persons in exchange for profits.

This enrages Godse, who kills Sameer despite threats from the DGP. Vaishali leaves after scolding the Home Secretary and manages to discover that Godse is actually a London-based businessman named Viswanath Ramachandra. Anand Kumar replaces her to negotiate with Godse, but the latter warns him to leave by threatening and kidnapping his minister uncle at knifepoint, since he wants to negotiate with Vaishali only. Vaishali is called back and Godse tells her to call MP Ajay Sarathy next. He confronts Ajay over killing Godse's pregnant wife, Shalini, by staging it as a robbery (the same case Vaishali failed in the beginning of the movie) and also brings the goon who had killed her.

When asked about his purpose, Godse asks Vaishali to bring media baron Punyamurthy, retired Chief Justice Anantha Krishnan and Chief Election Commissioner Lakshmi Narayana. Afterwards, Godse kills the goon in front of Vaishali. It is revealed that Godse arrived at the World Business Summit and was proposed a project by Phani Kumar and Ajay Sarathy. He refused the project and later came to his village for a college reunion, but learned that his best friend Rajaram had committed suicide. Rajaram was an unemployed science aspirant working as a painter, and committed suicide after being insulted and unable to fulfill his ambition.

Godse decide to shut down his businesses and start a new firm in India, but was stopped by Ajay, Phani Kumar, and the CM by making him to stop the construction and return to London. However, Godse decided to stay back and with the help of his hacker friend, managed to gather evidence about the CM, Phani Kumar, and Ajay's illegal activities. He went to provide the evidence to the Governor, but the CM orchestrated an accident which killed his friend, though Godse escaped. After learning about Shalini's death, he became a vigilante. In the present, Godse reveals that he already leaked about the ministers' illegal dealings to the media.

Anand and his team arrive at the island, but find that Godse escaped. Anand accidentally detonates a bomb, killing himself and the kidnapped businessmen. Godse arrives at the CM's house with purchased drones and attacks the security, where he meets the CM, Ajay and others. He makes an impassioned speech about the sacrifices of parents and students seeking jobs which is not their qualification, along with other aspirant businessmen seeking to do something for the nation. Godse then detonates his bomb jacket, which explodes and kills the CM and others along with him. Vaishali receives a hard drive from Godse's friend, and she submits its contents to the Governor, explaining that Godse's actions were a result of the corrupt political system. With this, the Governor takes actions against the politicians.

== Cast ==
- Satyadev as Viswanath Ramachandra alias Nathuram Godse
- Aishwarya Lekshmi as Vaishali
- Brahmaji as a Special Officer
- Tanikella Bharani as a Retired Judge
- Nagendra Babu as the Governor
- Shiju as CM
- Jia Sharma as Shalini, Godse's wife
- Prudhvi Raj as Industrial Minister Phani Kumar
- Priyadarshi Pulikonda as a Hacker
- Noel Sean as Raghava, Godse's friend
- Chaitanya Krishna as "Scientist" Rajaram, Godse's friend
- Ravi Prakash as SP Sameer
- Sasikumar Rajendran as Anand IPS, Manik Rao's nephew
- Mathew Varghese
- Pawan Santosh
- Guru Charan

== Production ==
The principal photography of the film began on 11 February 2021. The film marks Aishwarya Lekshmi (in her Telugu debut).

== Release ==
=== Theatrical ===
The film was released theatrically on 17 June 2022.

=== Home media ===
The digital streaming rights of the film is owned by Netflix. The film is scheduled to stream on Netflix from 17 July 2022.

== Reception ==
Paul Nicodemus of The Times of India rated the film 3 out of 5 and wrote "Satyadev once again hit it out of the park when it comes to getting under the skin of his characters. The actor aces his role like a breeze and evokes the right emotions among the viewers". 123Telugu rated the film 2.5 out of 5 and wrote, "On the whole, Godse is a half-baked hostage drama that has a decent first half. The second half is dull and the emotional aspect does not click. In all this, what keeps you going is Satyadev’s sincere and intense performance".

Y. Sunita Chowdhary of The Hindu opined that the film "has an interesting story of police-politicians nexus, but fails to engage". Asianet Telugu gave a rating of 2 out of 5 and felt that the film is lacks freshness and similar to Prathinidhi.
