= Aishwarya Lekshmi =

Indian actress (born 1991)

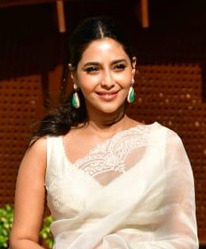
- Aishwarya in 2023
- Born: 6 September 1991 (age 35); Thiruvananthapuram, Kerala, India
- Education: Sree Narayana Institute of Medical Sciences, Kerala (MBBS)
- Occupations: Actress; producer
- Years active: 2017–present

Aishwarya Lekshmi (born 6 September 1991) is an Indian actress and producer who works predominantly in Malayalam and Tamil films. She has received one Filmfare Award South, one Tamil Nadu State Film Award, one Kerala Film Critics Association Award and three SIIMA Awards.

Lekshmi made her acting debut with the 2017 Malayalam film Njandukalude Nattil Oridavela, which earned her the Filmfare Award for Best Female Debut – South. She went on receive praises for Mayaanadhi (2017), Varathan (2018), Kaanekkaane (2021), the two-part Tamil epic Ponniyin Selvan: I (2022), which is her highest grossing releases and Ponniyin Selvan: II (2023), Ammu (2022), Kumari (2022), Gatta Kusthi (2022), Hello Mummy (2024) and Maaman (2025).

== Early life ==
Lekshmi was born on 6 September 1991 in Thiruvananthapuram, Kerala. She did her schooling at the Holy Angel's Convent Thiruvananthapuram and at Sacred Heart Convent Girls Higher Secondary School, Angamaly. She completed her MBBS degree from Sree Narayana Institute of Medical Sciences, Ernakulam, in 2017. She later completed her internship at the institute.

== Career ==
=== Debut and breakthrough (2017-2021) ===
Lekshmi has been modelling since 2014. She has appeared on the covers of magazines such as Flower World, Salt Studio, Vanitha and FWD Life. She has modelled for brands such as Chemmanur Jewellers, Karikkineth Silks, La Brenda, Ezva Boutique, Akshaya Jewels and Sri Lakshmi Jewellery among others.

Lekshmi states that she "never planned on acting", but gave her audition for Althaf Salim's 2017 film Njandukalude Nattil Oridavela starring Nivin Pauly and was cast in a prominent role. She then played an aspiring actress in the romantic thriller Mayaanadhi opposite Tovino Thomas. The film became a major success. Neelima Mohan of The News Minute called her the "heart and soul" of the film and added, "Emotions flit easily across her face—as a lover, the struggling model, the mortified daughter. She is a natural." In 2018, she appeared in Varathan opposite Fahadh Faasil, a box office success. Sajin Shrijith stated, "Aishwarya gets her own mass moment too through her act."

In 2019, Lekshmi had three Malayalam releases: Vijay Superum Pournamiyum opposite Asif Ali, Argentina Fans Kaattoorkadavu opposite Kalidas Jayaram and Brother's Day alongside Prithviraj Sukumaran. She also made her Tamil debut that year, with Action, opposite Vishal. In 2021, she first appeared in the Tamil film Jagame Thandhiram opposite Dhanush, and then had two Malayalam film releases, Laughing Budha and Kaanekkaane opposite Tovino Thomas. Anna MM Vetticad noted, "Tovino and Aishwarya are as immersed in their roles as they usually are, making it hard to unequivocally pass judgement against their characters."

=== Career expansion and commercial success (2022-present) ===
The year 2022 was a turning point in her career with nine film releases. Among these, only Gargi, Ponniyin Selvan: I and Gatta Kusthi emerged as commercial successes. Apart from a cameo in Gargi, which she also co-produced, she appeared in the anthology Putham Pudhu Kaalai Vidiyaadhaa, in Godse alongside Satyadev, her Telugu debut, in Captain opposite Arya. Ponniyin Selvan: I saw her play Poonguzhali opposite Ashwin Kakumanu. The film emerged as the fifth highest-grossing Tamil film of all time. She received praises for playing the titular role of a teacher in Archana 31 Not Out, a domestic violence victim in Ammu and an orphan in Kumari. For Ammu, Haricharan Pudipeddi of Hindustan Times noted, "As the helpless wife, Aishwarya plays her part so well. This is one of her best performances." Her last release that year was Gatta Kusthi, where she played a wrestler opposite Vishnu Vishal. Navein Darshan of Cinema Express stated, "Aishwarya sells the role effortlessly with both comedy and action."

In 2023, Lekshmi first appeared in Christopher alongside Mammootty. Gayathri Gokul of The Week stated that she does justice to her role. Lekshmi then reprised her character in the sequel Ponniyin Selvan: II. Later, she appeared opposite Dulquer Salmaan in King of Kotha. Lekshmi's first film of 2024 was Pon Ondru Kanden opposite Ashok Selvan, which simultaneously released on OTT and television. In her next film, she played an educated woman opposite Sharaf U Dheen in Hello Mummy. The film was a box office success.

Lekshmi's first release of 2025 saw her play a doctor opposite Soori in Maaman, which emerged a commercial success. Avinash Ramachandran of Cinema Express stated, "Aishwarya is terrific in a role that is quite layered, but is never given the breathing space to become something more prolific." She next played a doctor and Silambarasan's long lost sister in the multi-starrer Thug Life, which underperformed at the box office.

In her first release of 2026, Lekshmi reprised her role of a wrestler in Gatta Kusthi 2, reuniting with Vishnu Vishal. Janani K felt Lekshmi "owned the screen" with her performance, but criticised the character. The film emerged a commercial success. Following this, she played Urvashi's daughter in Aasha. Vivek Santhosh of The New Indian Express stated, "Even with comparatively limited screen time, Lekshmi makes a noticeable impression as the daughter, especially in scenes where she confronts Aasha's controlling nature." The film failed at the box office. Lekshmi then played a dating app founder opposite Arjun Das in her streaming debut Love. Udita Jhunjhunwala of Scroll.in felt she provide the series its "emotional texture" and was appreciative of her chemistry with Das.

== In the media ==
Lekshmi in 2019

Her performance in Mayaanadhi, is regarded as one of the "100 Greatest Performances of the Decade" by Film Companion. In 2022, Forbes India included Lekshmi in its first ever "Showstoppers – India's Top 50 Outperformers" list. Lekshmi was named the Kochi Times Most Desirable Women, both in 2018 and 2019, and was placed 4th in the list, in 2020. In the Times 50 Most Desirable Women list, she was placed 48th in both 2018 and 2019.

== Filmography ==
=== Films ===
Key
| † | Denotes films that have not yet been released |

| Year | Title | Role(s) | Language | Notes | Ref. |
|---|---|---|---|---|---|
| 2017 | Njandukalude Nattil Oridavela | Rachel | Malayalam | | |
| 2017 | Mayaanadhi | Aparna "Appu" Ravi | Malayalam | | |
| 2018 | Varathan | Priya Paul | Malayalam | | |
| 2019 | Vijay Superum Pournamiyum | Pinky / Pournami | Malayalam | | |
| 2019 | Argentina Fans Kaattoorkadavu | Meharunnisa Khaderkutty | Malayalam | | |
| 2019 | Brother's Day | Santa / Peeli | Malayalam | | |
| 2019 | Action | Meera | Tamil | | |
| 2021 | Jagame Thandhiram | Attilla | Tamil | | |
| 2021 | Laughing Budha | Dr. Angel | Malayalam | | |
| 2021 | Kaanekkaane | Sneha George | Malayalam | | |
| 2022 | Archana 31 Not Out | Archana | Malayalam | | |
| 2022 | Putham Pudhu Kaalai Vidiyaadhaa | Shobi | Tamil | Segment: "Nizhal Tharum Idham" | |
| 2022 | Gargi | Ahalya | Tamil | Cameo appearance; also producer | |
| 2022 | Captain | Kavya | Tamil | | |
| 2022 | Ponniyin Selvan: I | Poonguzhali | Tamil | | |
| 2022 | Gatta Kusthi | Keerthi | Tamil | | |
| 2022 | Godse | Vaishali | Telugu | | |
| 2022 | Ammu | Amudha "Ammu" Ravindranath | Telugu | Released on Amazon Prime Video | |
| 2022 | Kumari | Kumari Devan | Malayalam | Also co-producer | |
| 2023 | Christopher | Advocate Amina Ismail | Malayalam | | |
| 2023 | King of Kotha | Tara | Malayalam | | |
| 2023 | Ponniyin Selvan: II | Poonguzhali | Tamil | | |
| 2024 | Pon Ondru Kanden | Sundari "Sandy" | Tamil | Released on JioCinema | |
| 2024 | Hello Mummy | Stephy | Malayalam | | |
| 2025 | Maaman | Dr. Rekha | Tamil | | |
| 2025 | Thug Life | Chandra / Dr. Anna | Tamil | | |
| 2026 | Gatta Kusthi 2 | Keerthi | Tamil | | |
| 2026 | Aasha | Anagha | Malayalam | | |
| 2027 | SYG - Sambarala Yeti Gattu † | Vasantha | Telugu | Filming | |

=== Television ===
| Year | Title | Role(s) | Language | Ref. |
|---|---|---|---|---|
| 2026 | Love | Tara Krishnan | Tamil | |

=== Dubbing artist ===
- Minnal Murali (2021) for a school girl

== Awards and nominations ==
| Year | Award | Category | Film | Result | Ref. |
|---|---|---|---|---|---|
| 2017 | Asianet Comedy Awards | Most Promising Actor | Njandukalude Nattil Oridavela | Won | |
| 2018 | Asianet Film Awards | Best New Face – Female | Njandukalude Nattil Oridavela | Won | |
| 2018 | Filmfare Awards South | Best Female Debut | Njandukalude Nattil Oridavela | Won | |
| 2018 | South Indian International Movie Awards | Best Female Debut – Malayalam | Njandukalude Nattil Oridavela | Nominated | |
| 2018 | South Indian International Movie Awards | Best Actress – Malayalam | Mayaanadhi | Nominated | |
| 2018 | South Indian International Movie Awards | Best Actress Critics – Malayalam | Mayaanadhi | Won | |
| 2018 | Kerala Film Critics Association Awards | Second Best Actress | Mayaanadhi | Won | |
| 2018 | Vanitha Film Awards | Most Romantic Heroine | Mayaanadhi | Won | |
| 2018 | Filmfare Awards South | Best Actress – Malayalam | Mayaanadhi | Nominated | |
| 2019 | Asiavision Awards | Star of the Year | Varathan | Won | |
| 2019 | CPC Cine Awards | Best Actress in a Leading Role | Varathan | Won | |
| 2019 | Vanitha Film Awards | Best Popular Actress | Varathan | Won | |
| 2019 | Filmfare Awards South | Best Actress – Malayalam | Varathan | Nominated | |
| 2019 | Asianet Film Awards | Best Actress | Varathan | Nominated | |
| 2019 | Asianet Film Awards | Best Popular Actress | Varathan | Won | |
| 2019 | South Indian International Movie Awards | Best Actress – Malayalam | Varathan | Won | |
| 2022 | South Indian International Movie Awards | Best Actress – Malayalam | Kaanekkaane | Won | |
| 2023 | Filmfare Awards South | Best Actress – Malayalam | Kumari | Nominated | |
| 2023 | Filmfare Awards South | Best Actress – Telugu | Ammu | Nominated | |
| 2023 | Filmfare Awards South | Best Actress – Tamil | Gatta Kusthi | Nominated | |
| 2023 | Filmfare Awards South | Best Supporting Actress – Tamil | Ponniyin Selvan: I | Nominated | |
| 2023 | Filmfare Awards South | Best Film - Tamil | Gargi | Nominated | |
| 2026 | Tamil Nadu State Film Awards | Best Film | Gargi | Won | |
