= Priyaa Lal =

British actress

- Born: Priyanka Lalaji; 1 August, Liverpool, England
- Other name: Priya
- Occupations: Actress; Sports Presenter
- Years active: 2010–present

Priyanka Lalaji, better known as Priyaa Lal is a British actress who primarily appears in Malayalam, Tamil and Telugu Feature films. She made her cinematic debut in the Malayalam film Janakan in 2010, directed by N. R. Sanjeev with Mohanlal and Suresh Gopi.

== Early life ==
Priyaa Lal was born in Ras al-Khaimah in the United Arab Emirates. Her Malayali parents Lalaji and Beena are from Kerala. She has an elder brother Deepak Lalaji. When Priyaa was a young child, her family migrated to the United Kingdom, to Liverpool, England.

== Career ==
Priyaa debuted with Janakan in 2011 which was a commercial success. She later did a couple of movies in Malayalam film industry including Killadi Raman (2011) and Lord Livingstone 7000 Kandi (2015).

== Filmography ==
=== Film ===
Year	Film	Role	Language	Notes
2010	Janakan	Seetha/Anu	Malayalam	Debut Film
2011	Killadi Raman	Radhika	Malayalam	
2015	Lord Livingstone 7000 Kandi	Meenkanni	Malayalam	
2018	Genius	Jasmine	Tamil	
2019	Lots of Love (LOL)	Nagalakshmi (Telugu); Harini (Tamil)	Telugu & Tamil	Web Series for MX Player
2020	Guvva Gorinka	Shirisha	Telugu	Released on Amazon Prime Video
2023	Gentleman2	unknown	Tamil	Announced

=== Television ===
Year	Title	Role	Channel
2016	Comedy Super Nite 2	Host	Flowers TV
2019	Champions Boat League (CBL)	Sports Presenter	Star Sports
2019-2020	Indian Super League (ISL)	Sports Presenter	Star Sports
