= Bluff Master (2018 film) =

2018 film by Gopi Ganesh Pattabhi

- Theatrical release poster
- Directed by: Gopiganesh Pattabhi
- Story by: H. Vinoth
- Produced by: Ramesh P. Pillai
- Starring: Satyadev; Nandita Swetha; Brahmaji
- Cinematography: Dasaradhi Sivendra
- Edited by: Naveen Nooli
- Music by: Sunil Kashyap
- Production company: Abhishek Films
- Release date: 28 December 2018
- Running time: 138 minutes
- Country: India
- Language: Telugu
- Box office: 3.3 crore

Bluff Master is a 2018 Indian Telugu-language heist thriller film directed by Gopiganesh Pattabhi starring Satyadev and Nandita Swetha in the lead roles, while Brahmaji play supporting role. Produced by Ramesh P Pillai, it features music by Sunil Kashyap and cinematography by Dasaradhi Sivendra. It is an official remake of 2014 Tamil movie, Sathuranga Vettai. The film received positive responses after its digital release since the film had a limited theatrical release.

== Plot ==
Uttam Kumar is a skilled con man. He dreams of doing ingenious scams and executes them perfectly. His scams include selling ignorant people ordinary snakes, claiming that they are exotic and will fetch crores in the international market, promoting a nonexistent multi-level marketing company with its controversial chain referral schemes promising a BMW car within a year. His scams include duping people through impersonation - posing close to/claiming relationship with influential people, the convincing people of things such as Lilliput, exotic stones, and artifacts, last but not least the infamous Emu scam, where the investors were offered exorbitant returns through Emu farms. Avani is an orphan from Chinna Waltair. She comes to work for Uttam and falls for his charms. Uttam, despite having a soft corner for her, has money as his first priority. Because of this, he abandons Avani.

About 40 minutes into the film, Uttam is arrested in a minor scam, but the local police didn't realise his real identity. As the newspaper publishes this scam as a small box news of low importance, ACP Chandra Sekhar IPS of Hyderabad Police identifies Uttam and informs the local police and multiple cases are filed against him. The police subject him to torture and try to recover the money but in vain. Uttam comes to reveal his past - He hails from a very poor family with his father working as a clerk and his mother a flower selling vendor. Once, when his father heard his higher officials talking about starting a scam. He politely asks them not to do so, but he is thrown and fired by them. Following a stampede, his father dies, and his mother goes in a critical condition. A kind woman assures her that her son will be educated only to be seen leaving with a suitcase. When Uttam said the whole story to his mother, she suddenly dies. Overcome by grief, he decides to cheat greedy people. As the court releases him months later due to the absence of solid evidence, his associates betray Uttam and escape with the remaining money. An angered investor hires Pasupathi and his gang to recover his money and kill Uttam. The Gang nabs him outside the court, and he is beaten to a pulp. Later, he convinces them to make another con of worth a billion rupees and pay them more than their hirer. Believing his abilities, they kill and dispose of their hirer and pull another scam to fuel a bigger one. He believes that if a person is foolish or greedy enough to be duped, then the person is to be blamed. He argues that every election voters are conned by the candidates who promise them the moon but never come through.

The next scam was nothing but a trap laid for gang by Uttam, he sends the gang to a victim of one his old scams Dhana Setty knowing that they'll get caught as he's alert and will call the police due to his past experience. The gang gets arrested and angered by Uttam's betrayal.

Meanwhile, he moves back to Avani, and she looks after him for some time, gives a second chance to him, and they get married and leave for Chikmagalore and starts a small nursery, in the process he realises the value of hard earned money. Later, she becomes pregnant. As the gang gets released, they threaten Uttam to pull a bigger scam and compensate their losses and settle their lump sum of money, else he and his wife will be killed.

Uttam agrees, gang leaves Basava to keep an eye on pregnant Avani, and leaves to Bengaluru to perform a final heist to hand over the money to them. They target Ugrappa Gowda, a rich and politically well-connected marble and granite businessman, they target him through - the rice pulling scam, one of the high-profile scams during the times. They offer the artifact involved in the scam as a solution to his personal, economical and political problems. As Ugrappa agrees to the deal, the artifact is transferred after rituals, and the gang receives 100 Crore Rupees as payment.

The passage of money results in a tussle. Uttam kills them and returns to his wife and child with the money. Meanwhile, Basava, after observing Avani, completely changed his attitude and transformed into a good, sensitive, and careful human being who once a ruthless gangster. Finally, Avani looks at him at scared and disgust, and then Uttam realizes the value of life, and he leaves the money to the police custody.

== Cast ==
- Satyadev as Uttam Kumar
- Nandita Swetha as Avani
- Brahmaji as Guru Bhai
- Adithya Menon as Pasupathi
- Prudhvi Raj as Dhana Shetty
- Shiju as ACP Chandra Sekhar
- Temper Vamsi as Basava
- Chaitanya Krishna as Nandu
- Fish Venkat as Guard
- Ashok Kumar
- Kotesh Manava as Judge

== Soundtrack ==
Bluff Master

Soundtrack album by Sunil Kashyap
- Released: 20 December 2018
- Recorded: 2018
- Genre: Feature film soundtrack
- Length: 17:22
- Language: Telugu
- Label: Aditya Music
- Producer: Sunil Kashyap

The official soundtrack of Bluff Master consisting of four songs was composed by Sunil Kashyap.

Track listing
| No. | Title | Lyrics | Singer(s) | Length |
|---|---|---|---|---|
| 1. | "Yevo Rangula Parichayam" | Ramajogayya Sastry | Sricharan Janga | 3:45 |
| 2. | "Ye Mayo Yemo" | Vishwanath kaarasala | Sunitha | 3:59 |
| 3. | "Neethone" | Ramajogayya Sastry | Sunil Kashyap | 2:55 |
| 4. | "Satkarmabhista" | Madhurakavi Koganti Venkataacharyulu, Ramajogayya Sastry | Sunil Kashyap, Anurag Kulkarni, Mohana Bhogaraju | 2:49 |
| 5. | "What The BEEP (promotional song)" | Lakshmi Bhupala | Satyadev, Sunil Kashyap | 3:33 |
| Total length: | | | | 13:46 |

== Reception ==
The Times of India gave the film two-and-a-half out of five stars and wrote that "Though Bluff Master never runs out of steam, the director Gopi Ganesh Pattabhi and his screenplay stumble in striking an emotional connect to the story.". The Hindu wrote that " Satyadev's energy and the background score try to elevate the story".
