= Rajalakshmy =

Indian singer (born 1983)

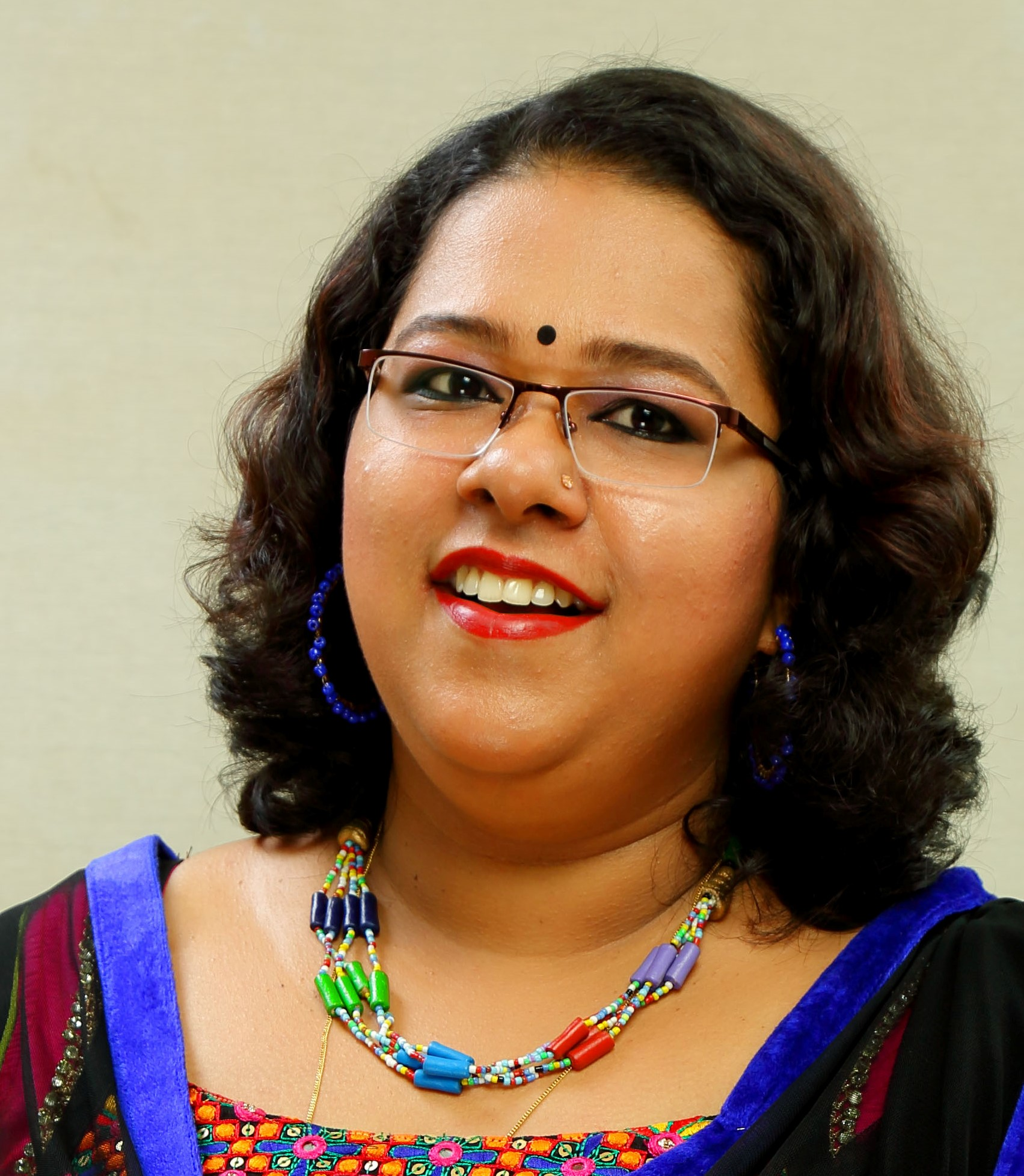
- Born: 13 October 1983 (age 43)
- Occupation: Singer
- Years active: 1994–present
- Spouse: Abhiram Krishnan
- Children: Aaryan R Krishna

Rajalakshmy is a playback singer and made her mark in the Malayalam film music industry by winning the Kerala State Film Award for the Best Playback Singer in 2011.

== Personal life ==
Rajalakshmy was born on 13 October, in to a musical family in Eranakulam. Her talent was recognized at a very early age by her mother Parvathy, who was a professional singer in the early 1960s. Rajalakshmy attended St. Ann's English Medium Higher Secondary School, Eloor and Government Girls Higher Secondary School, Eranakulam. She attained a bachelor's degree in English literature from St. Teresa's College, Eranakulam.

== Professional career ==
Rajalakshmy began her career at the age of nine. She appeared as a child artist in hundreds of ganamela stages of Tansen Music, Cochin Kalabhavan, Cochin Melodies, C.A.C. She did more than 1000 musical albums, and worked with music directors K. Raghavan, Raveendran, Johnson, Jerry Amaldev, Syam, Ouseppachan, Mohan Sitara Jaya (Vijaya), Vidyasagar, Sharett, M. Jayachandran, Jassie Gift, Bijibal, Deepak Dev, Gopi sundar, Afsal Yusaf, Stephan Devassy, and Rony Raphel. Doordarshan's Hamsadwany, the first music competition in Malayalam television, made Rajalakshmy more popular among viewers. Rajalakshmy was introduced to the film industry by Jassie Gift in the film Aswaroodan directed by Jayaraj. But a break was given by M.Jayachandran in the film Orkuka Vallapozhum.

== Discography ==
Year	Song	Film	Composer(s)	Lyricist	Co-singer(s)
2025	Kondattam	Thudarum	Jakes Bejoy	Vinayak Sasikumar	M. G. Sreekumar
2018	Oru Kannuneerkkanam	Oru Kuprasiddha Payyan	Ouseppachan	Sreekumaran Thampi	Sudeep Kumar
2016	Sneham Nee	Charlie	Gopi Sundar	Rafeeq Ahamed	(Solo)
2015	Malarvaakakkombathu	Ennum Eppozhum	Vidyasagar	Rafeeq Ahamed	P. Jayachandran
2011	Innu Penninu	China Town	Jassie Gift	Anil Panachooran	Manjari
2009	Olichirunne	Janakan	M. Jayachandran	Girish Puthenchery	(Solo)
2009	Neela Koovala	Katha Samvidhanam Kunchacko	M. Jayachandran	Girish Putherncherry	Vineeth Sreenivasan
2008	Nalla Maambooppaadam	Orkkuka Vallappozhum	M. Jayachandran	Gireesh Puthenchery	Anand Narayan
