= List of Malayalam films of 2020 =

This is a list of Malayalam films that released in 2020.

== Released films ==
*	Film released directly on OTT platform(s).

Opening		Title	Director	Cast	Production house	Ref
J A N U A R Y	2	Dhamaka	Omar Lulu	Arun Kumar, Nikki Galrani, Urvashi, Dharmajan Bolgatty, Salim Kumar, Sabumon Abdusamad	Good Line Productions	
J A N U A R Y	3	Thallumpidi	Prajin Prathap	Devi Ajith, Prajin Prathap, Muhammed Raffi, Kulappulli Leela, Bijil Babu Ramakrishnan	P Cinemas	
J A N U A R Y	3	Maarjaara Oru Kalluvacha Nuna	Raakesh Baala	Hareesh Peradi, Tini Tom, Abhirami, Sudheer Karamana, Jason Chacko, Renu Soundar, Vihaan	Mullappally Productions	
J A N U A R Y	3	Kuttiyappanum Daivadhootharum	Gokul Hariharan	Lal Jose, V. Suresh Thampanoor, Arun Gopan	Feel Good Entertainments	
J A N U A R Y	3	Sameer	Rasheed Parakkal	Mammukoya, Anand Roshan, Anagha Sajeev, Chinju Sunny	Good Day Movies	
J A N U A R Y	3	Velathaan	Karumadi Rajendran	Shibu Jayaraj	K.J.L. Films	
J A N U A R Y	10	Anjaam Pathiraa	Midhun Manuel Thomas	Kunchacko Boban, Sreenath Bhasi, Ramya Nambeeshan, Sharafudheen, Jinu Joseph, Unnimaya Prasad	Ashiq Usman Productions & Manual Movie Makers	
J A N U A R Y	10	Kalamandalam Hyderali	Kiran G. Nath	Renji Panicker, Ashokan, Jayan Cherthala, Kalabhavan Rahman, Paris Laxmi	Chithranjali Studio & Vedhas Creations	
J A N U A R Y	11	Aalkoottathil Oruvan	Sainu Chavakkandan	Hari Menon, Aiswarya Anil Kumar, Kichu Tellus, Bitto Davis, Tony, Spadikam George, Saju Navodaya	High Seas International	
J A N U A R Y	16	Big Brother	Siddique	Mohanlal, Arbaaz Khan, Anoop Menon, Sarjano Khalid, Siddique, Vishnu, Tini Tom, Irshad, Mirnaa Menon, Honey Rose	S Talkies, Shaman International & Vaishaka Cynyma	
J A N U A R Y	17	Uriyadi	M J Varghese	Sreenivasan, Siddique	56 Cinemas, Friends Film Factory	
J A N U A R Y	17	Al Mallu	Boban Samuel	Namitha Pramod, Miya George	Mehfil Productions	
J A N U A R Y	17	24 Days	Sreekanth E.G.	Adith U.S., KK Menon, Ranjith Gopal, Binoy Sudhan, Risham Khan, Rajeev Ashok, Simi Sunny	Adith	
J A N U A R Y	23	Shylock	Ajai Vasudev	Mammootty, Meena, Rajkiran, Arthana Binu, Hareesh Kanaran, Siddique, Baiju Santhosh	Goodwill Entertainments	
J A N U A R Y	24	The Kung fu Master	Abrid Shine	Neeta Pillai, Jiji Scaria, Sanoop Dinesh	FullOn Studio Frames	
J A N U A R Y	24	Silencer	Priyanandan	Lal, Meera Vasudev, Irshad	Benzy Productions	
J A N U A R Y	24	Kottayam	Binu Bhaskar	Sangeeth Sivan, Aneesh G. Menon, Annapoorna	Nitevox	
J A N U A R Y	24	Cochin Shadhi at Chennai 03	Manjith Divakar	Neha Saxena, Sonia Agarwal, Charmila, R. K. Suresh, Akshatha Sreedhar	Arya Aadhi International Movies	
J A N U A R Y	24	Thakkol Pazhuthu	Hafiz Ismail	Santhosh Keezhattur, Bose Venkat	Anandam Pictures D D Movies	
J A N U A R Y	31	Anweshanam	Prashobh Vijayan	Jayasurya, Vijay Babu, Lal, Shruthi Ramachandran, Leona Lishoy	AVA Productions & E4 Entertainment	
J A N U A R Y	31	Mariyam Vannu Vilakkoothi	Jenith Kachappilly	Siju Wilson, Krishna Shankar, Shabareesh Varma	ARK Media & Ragam Movies	
J A N U A R Y	31	Gauthamante Radham	Anand Menon	Neeraj Madhav, Renji Panicker, Basil Joseph, Biju Sopanam	Kichappus Entertainments	
J A N U A R Y	31	Oru Vadakkan Pennu	Irshad Hameed	Vijay Babu, Nadiya Kalhara, Sreejith Ravi, Sona Nair, Anjali Nair	Jams Film House	
J A N U A R Y	31	Kattu Kadal Athirukal	Samad Mankada	Anu Mohan, Leona Lishoy, Anil Murali	Cocoon Productions	
J A N U A R Y	31	Vahni	Adwaith Shine	Neena Kurup, Kulappulli Leela, Priya Shine, Ashitha Aravind	Nechuraan Films	
F E B R U A R Y	7	Ayyappanum Koshiyum	Sachy	Prithviraj Sukumaran, Biju Menon, Ranjith, Anna Rajan, Gowri Nandha	Gold Coin Motion Pictures	
F E B R U A R Y	7	Varane Avashyamund	Anoop Sathyan	Dulquer Salmaan, Suresh Gopi, Shobana, Kalyani Priyadarshan, Urvashi	Wayferer films and M Star entertainments	
F E B R U A R Y	7	Pachamanga	Jayesh Mainagapally	Pratap K. Pothen, Sona Heiden	Full Mark Cinema & Team Cinema	
F E B R U A R Y	14	Balcony	Krishnajith S. Vijayan	Bhama Arun, Vishnu Raghu	Edamula Films	
F E B R U A R Y	14	Uriyattu	K.Bhuvanachandran	Ashish Vidyarthi, Sunil Sukhada, Sreejith Ravi, Malavika Mohanan, Jayan Cherthala	Play N Picture Creations	
F E B R U A R Y	20	Trance	Anwar Rasheed	Fahadh Faasil, Nazriya Nazim, Gautham Vasudev Menon, Soubin Shahir, Vinayakan, Dileesh Pothan, Chemban Vinod Jose, Joju George, Dharmajan Bolgatty, Sreenath Bhasi	Anwar Rasheed Entertainments	
F E B R U A R Y	21	Paapam Cheyyathavar Kalleriyatte	Shambhu Purushothaman	Vinay Forrt, Srindha, Santhy Balachandran, Anumol, Arun Kurien	Spire Productions	
F E B R U A R Y	28	Forensic	Akhil Paul, Anas Khan	Tovino Thomas, Mamta Mohandas, Reba Monica	Juvis Production	
F E B R U A R Y	28	Veyilmarangal	Bijukumar Damodaran	Indrans, Prakash Bare, Saritha Kukku	Soma Creations	
F E B R U A R Y	28	Bhoomiyile Manohara Swakaryam	Shyju Anthiikkad	Deepak Parambol, Prayaga Martin, Lal, Anju Aravind, Shine Tom Chacko	Bioscope Talkies	
F E B R U A R Y	28	Isha	Jose Thomas	Kishor Satya, Abhishek Vinod, Margaret Antony	Visual Dreams	
F E B R U A R Y	28	Kaalan Venu	Wilson Kavilpad	Edwin Sabu, Baby Xavier	Olattpuram Films	
F E B R U A R Y	28	Love FM	Sreedev Kappur	Sarath Appani, Titto Wilson, Malavika Menon, Janaki Krishna, Anju Sasi	Benzy Productions	
F E B R U A R Y	28	Joshua	Peter Sunder Dhas	Master Abel Peter, Priyanka Nair, Hemanth Menon, Anand, Dinesh Panicker	The Alive Media	
M A R C H	6	Kappela	Muhammad Musthafa	Roshan Mathew, Sreenath Bhasi, Anna Ben, Sudhi Koppa	Kadhaas Untold	
M A R C H	6	2 States	Jacky S Kumar	Manu Pillai, AJITH KUMAR, Sharanya R Nair, Mukesh, Vijayaraghavan	Renaissance Pictures	
M A R C H	6	Kozhipporu	Jinoy Janardhanan	Veena Nandakumar, Indrans, Jinoy Janardhanan	PIC Movies	
M A R C H	6	Varkey	Adarsh Venugopalan	Samad Sulaiman, Drishya Dinesh, Salim Kumar, Sreejith Ravi		
J U N E	20	Alt Ctrl Del	Gireesh Nair	Priya Pradeep, Shaniya Mishra, Sonith Chandran, Sanoj NC, Gopu Keshav	Cockroach Media, MX Player	
J U N E	28	Fourth River	RK DreamWest	Diphul Mathew; Nithu Chandran; Baiju Bala	Dreamwest Global India Pvt. Ltd., Amazon Prime Video	
J U L Y	3	Sufiyum Sujatayum	Naranipuzha Shanavas	Jayasurya, Aditi Rao Hydari, Dev Mohan, Siddique	Friday Film House, Prime Video	
J U L Y	3	Pixelia	Ratheesh Ravindran	Sanal Aman, Vijay Menon, Gowri Savithri, Afeeda KT, Vedh Vishnu	DocArt Productions	Released on MX player and later on Neestream on 7 August 2021
J U L Y	6	Musical Chair	Vipin Atley	Vipin Atley, Allen Rajan Mathew	Spyrogyra Productions	
J U L Y	27	Elam	Vinod Krishna	Thampy Antony, Kavitha Nair	Ego Planet Productions, Amazon Prime	
A U G U S T	8	Konnappookkalum Mampazhavum	Abhilash S	Jaidan Philip, Sreedarsh, Sanjay Suni, Anagha	Village Talkies	
A U G U S T	24	Idam	Jaya Jose Raj	Seema Biswas, Hareesh Peradi, Anil Nedumangad, Abija Shivakala, Leela Panikker	Bodhi Academy	Released on Mubi.com and on various OTT platforms in 2021
A U G U S T	28	Velutha Rathrikal	Razi Muhammed	Smitha Anbu, Saritha Kukku, Disney James	Blue Light Films	Released on Mubi.com and on Cave India OTT on 5 May 2021
A U G U S T	31	Maniyarayile Ashokan	Shamzu Zayba	Jacob Gregory, Anupama Parameswaran, Nazriya Nazim, Dulquer Salmaan, Anu Sithara	Wayfarer Films, Netflix	
A U G U S T	31	Kilometers and Kilometers	Jeo Baby	Tovino Thomas, India Jarvis	NHQ Cochin	Onam premiere release on Asianet
S E P T E M B E R	1	C U Soon	Mahesh Narayanan	Fahadh Faasil, Roshan Mathew, Darshana Rajendran, Saiju Kurup	Amazon Prime Video	
O C T O B E R	9	Transition (2020 film)	Krishnanunni Mangalath	Akhil Prasannakumar, Megha Priya Sunil, Reghu Chullimanoor, Krishna Kanth, Sreekumar Nair	Two Jobless People, Luna Creations	Released through Mainstream TV
O C T O B E R	9	Virgin	Arun Sagara	Sethu Madhavan Thampi, Maneesha Mohan	Heaven Movies	Released through Prime Theatre OTT
O C T O B E R	15	Halal Love Story	Zakariya Mohammed	Indrajith Sukumaran, Joju George, Parvathy Thiruvothu, Sharaf U Dheen, Grace Antony, Soubin Shahir	Papaya Films; OPM Cinemas; Ourhood Movies	
O C T O B E R	15	Love	Khalid Rahman	Shine Tom Chacko, Rajisha Vijayan, Johny Antony, Sudhi Koppa	Ashiq Usman Productions	Initially released in UAE and later released in India on 29 January 2021
N O V E M B E R	1	Oru Arabian Pranayakadha	Vishnu Gopi	Vijil Shivan, Deepthi Prakash, Shafas Basheer, Dileep Kumar	Saina Play, Viral Grid	
D E C E M B E R	28	Prathividhi	Sravan Sumith	Shaijal Safath, Dhanil Krishna, Rahoof P K	Neestream, Four S Creations	First Film of Neestream OTT
