= Sreejesh Nair =

Indian sound Mixer

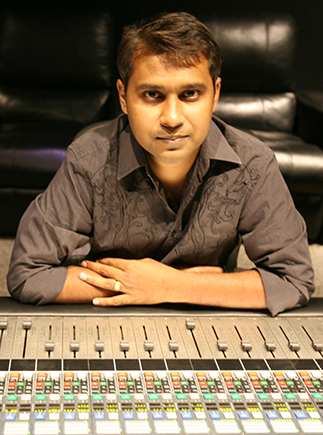
- Born: 5 October 1980 (age 45); Thiruvananthapuram
- Occupation: Sound engineer
- Years active: 2003–present
- Children: Shriyana, Shriha

Sreejesh Nair (born 1980) is an Indian sound engineer and sound mixer. He has worked in Hindi, Marathi, Tamil and Malayalam films.

== Biography ==
Sreejesh Nair owns to his credit a span of decades of experience since 2012, as a Sound Mixer in this industry. Sreejesh, who is currently based in Dubai and hails from Thiruvananthapuram, has done his B.Tech in Mechanical Engineering from Rajiv Gandhi Institute of Technology, Kottayam and mastered Audio Engineering From Chetana Sound Studios, Thrissur. He started his career as assistant sound re-recording mixer in Rajkamal(FutureWorks) studios and has since become a Senior Re-Recording Mixer there. He has worked on more than 200 movies since then. He was part of the First Dolby Atmos Mix theater installation in India and the first Dolby Atmos Premiere mix room in the world. He is an internationally renowned subject expert for Dolby Atmos and immersive Music mixing. Sreejesh Nair won the 60th National Film Awards for the best Re-recordist of the Final Mixed Track for the film Gangs of Wasseypur. His work for the documentary, A Few Sound Men, directed by Avinash Jojo Antony, earned him 4 IRAA Awards in 2020. The highest number by a single person. He has also done a number of art installations in Paris and Mumbai with artists like Shilpa Gupta & Rajivan Ayyappan. He is currently working as Solutions Specialist at Avid.

== Awards and recognition ==
– 60th National Film Awards: Best Re-recordist of the Final Mixed Track for Gangs of Wasseypur - Part 2 (2013).

– IRAA Awards 2020: Won four awards for his work on the documentary A Few Sound Men, directed by Avinash Jojo Antony.

– IRAA Awards 2024: Awarded for Immersive Music Mixing for the project Mohabbat – Love with Pride.

== Selected filmography ==
Year	Title	Director	Language	Notes	Credit
2024	Jigra	Vasan Bala	Hindi		Re-Recording Mixer
2024	Umro Ayyar - A New Beginning	Azfar Jafri	Urdu		Re-Recording Mixer
2023	Equals	Suruchi Sharma	Hindi		Music Mix for 2 Episodes
2023	Thankamani (film)	Ratheesh Reghunandan	Malayalam		Sound Mix & Sound Design
2023	Jawan	Atlee	Hindi		Additional Mix
2023	Ennalum Ente Aliya	Bash Mohammed	Malayalam		Sound Mix & Sound Design
2022	The Legend of Maula Jatt	Bilal Lashari	Punjabi		Sound Mix & Sound Design
2019	Thirike	George Kora	Malayalam		Re-recording Mixer
2019	Valiyaperunnal	Dimal Dennis	Malayalam		Re-recording Mixer
2018	Balekempa	Ere Gowda	Kannada		Re-recording Mixer
2017	Njandukalude Nattil Oridavela	Althaf Salim	Malayalam		Re-recording Mixer
2017	Jagga Jasoos	Anurag Basu	Hindi		Additional Re-recording Mixer
2016	The Fakir of Venice	Anand Surapur	Hindi		Re-recording Mixer
2016	Udta Punjab	Abhishek Chaubey	Hindi		Re-recording Mixer
2015	Moor	Jami	Urdu		Re-recording Mixer
2015	Bombay Velvet	Anurag Kashyap	Hindi		Re-recording Mixer
2013	Inkaar	Sudhir Mishra	Hindi		Re-recording Mixer
2012	Balak-Palak	Ravi Jadhav	Marathi		Re-recording Mixer
2012	Billa – II	Chakri Toleti	Tamil		Re-recording Mixer
2012	Rowdy Rathore	Prabhu Deva	Hindi	Remake of Telugu Film Vikramarkudu	Re-recording Mixer
2012	Gangs of Wasseypur – II	Anurag Kashyap	Hindi		Re-recording Mixer
2012	Agneepath	Karan Malhotra	Hindi		Re-recording Mixer
2011	Jo Hum Chahein	Pawan Gill	Hindi		Re-recording Mixer
2011	Aazaan	Prashant Chadha	Hindi		Sound Editor
2011	My Friend Pinto	Raaghav Dar	Hindi		Re-recording Mixer
2011	Rascals	David Dhawan	Hindi		Sound Editor
2011	Force	Nishikanth Kamath	Hindi		Effects Mixer
2011	Harry Potter and the Deathly Hallows – Part 2	David Yates	English		Version Re-recording Mixer
2011	Green Lantern	Martin Campbell	English		Version Re-recording Mixer
2011	Stanley Ka Dabba	Amole Gupte	Hindi		Re-recording Mixer
2011	Happy Husbands	Anay Sharma	Hindi		Re-recording Mixer
2011	Sucker Punch	Zack Snyder	English		Version Re-recording Mixer
2011	Yeh Saali Zindagi	Sudhir Mishra	Hindi		Sound Designer
2011	Yamla Pagla Deewana	Samir Karnik	Hindi		Sound Editor
2010	Khelein Hum Jee Jaan Sey	Ashutosh Gowarikar	Hindi		Re-recording Mixer
2010	Allah Ke Banday	Faruk Kabir	Hindi		Re-recording Mixer
2010	Harry Potter and the Deathly Hallows – Part 1	David Yates	English		Version Re-recording Mixer
2010	Nakshatra	Mohan Savalkar	Hindi		Sound Designer & Re-recording Mixer
2010	Kajraare	Pooja Bhatt	Hindi		Re-recording Mixer
2010	Knock Out	Mani Shankar	Hindi		Sound Editor & Re-recording Mixer
2010	Apoorvaragam	Sibi Malayil	Malayalam		Re-recording Mixer
2010	Inception	Christopher Nolan	English		Version Re-recording Mixer
2010	Clash of the Titans	Louis Leterrier	English		Version Re-recording Mixer
2010	LSD: Love, Sex Aur Dhokha	Dibakar Banerjee	Hindi		Re-recording Mixer
2010	Chance Pe Dance	Ken Ghosh	Hindi		Film Score Mixer
2010	Aayirathil Oruvan	K.Selvaraghavan	Tamil		Sound Designer
2010	Natarang	Ravi Jadhav	Marathi		Re-recording Mixer
2009	Paa	R. Balki	Hindi		Re-recording Mixer
2009	Tum Mile	Kunal Deshmukh	Hindi		Re-recording Mixer
2009	London Dreams	Vipul Shah	Hindi		Re-recording Mixer
2009	Aladin	Sujoy Ghosh	Hindi		Sound Editor
2009	What's Your Rashee?	Ashutosh Gowariker	Hindi		Re-recording Mixer
2009	Road, Movie	Dev Benegal	Hindi		Sound Editor
2009	Kaminey	Vishal Bharadwaj	Hindi		Re-recording Mixer
2009	Well Done Abba	Shyam Benegal	Hindi		Associate re-recording Mixer
2009	Detective Naani	Romilla Mukherjee	Hindi		Associate re-recording Mixer
2009	99	Krishna D.K & Raj Nidimoru	Hindi		Sound effects editor
2008	Dhoondte Reh Jaaoge	Umesh Shukla	Hindi		Sound Editor
2008	Watchmen	Zack Snyder	English		Version Re-recording Mixer
2008	The Fakir of Venice	Anand Surapur	Hindi		Re-recording Mixer
2008	Jumbo	Kompin Kemgumnird	Hindi		Sound Editor & Re-recording Mixer
2008	Dasvidaniya	Shashant Shah	Hindi		Sound Editor & Sound Mixer
2008	Rang Rasiya	Ketan Mehta	Hindi		Re-Recording Mixer
2008	Welcome to Sajjanpur	Shyam Benegal	Hindi		Associate Re-recording Mixer
2008	Firaaq	Nandita Das	Hindi		Sound mixing assistant
2008	Love Story 2050	Harry Baweja	Hindi		Assistant sound designer
2008	Jannat	Kunal Deshmukh	Hindi		Re-recording Mixer
2008	Jodha Akbar	Ashutosh Gowariker	Hindi		Re-recording Mixer, Sound Editor
2007	Saade Maade Teen	Ankush Choudhary	Marathi		Re-recording Mixer
2007	Speed	Vikram Bhatt	Hindi		Associate Re-recording Mixer
2007	Go	Manish Shrivastava	Hindi		Associate Re-recording Mixer & Sound Designer
2007	Dhokha	Pooja Bhatt	Hindi		Associate Re-recording Mixer
2007	Harry Potter and the Order of the Phoenix	David Yates	English		Version Re-recording Mixer
2007	Cheeni Kum	R. Balki	Hindi		Associate Re-recording Mixer
2007	Life in a... Metro	Anurag Basu	Hindi		Associate Re-recording Mixer
2007	Kya Love Story Hai	Lovely Singh	Hindi		Associate Re-recording Mixer
2007	The Reaping	Stephen Hopkins	English		Version Re-recording Mixer
2007	Just Married	Meghna Gulzar	Hindi		Re-recording Mixer
2007	Honeymoon Travels Pvt. Ltd.	Reema Kagti	Hindi		Associate Re-recording Mixer
2006	Shubhamangal Savadhan	Mahesh Kothare	Marathi		Re-recording Mixer
2006	300	Zack Snyder	English		Version Re-recording Mixer
2006	Sarhad Paar	Raman Kumar	Hindi		Associate Re-recording Mixer
2006	Jaan-E-Mann	Shirish Kunder	Hindi		Associate Re-recording Mixer
2006	Zindaggi Rocks	Shirish Kunder	Hindi		Associate Re-recording Mixer
2006	Woh Lamhe	Mohit Suri	Hindi		Associate Re-recording Mixer
2006	Anthony Kaun Hai?	Raj Kaushal	Hindi		Associate Re-recording Mixer
2006	Omkara	Vishal Bhardwaj	Hindi		Sound Editor
2006	Poseidon	Wolfgang Petersen	English		Version Re-recording Mixer
2006	Gangster	Anurag Basu	Hindi		Associate Re-recording Mixer
2006	Shaadi Se Pehle	Satish Kaushik	Hindi		Associate Re-recording Mixer
2006	Teesri Aankh: The Hidden Camera	Harry Baweja	Hindi		Associate Re-recording Mixer
2006	Printed Rainbow	Gitanjali Rao		Short	Re-recording Mixer
2006	Pyaar Ke Side Effects	Saket Chaudhary	Hindi		Mixing Assistant
2006	Taxi No. 9 2 11: Nau Do Gyarah	Milan Luthria	Hindi		Assistant Re-recording mixer
2006	Aisa Kyon Hota Hai?	Ajay Kanchan	Hindi		Associate Re-recording mixer
2006	Chingaari	Kalpana Lajmi	Hindi		Associate Re-recording mixer
2006	Holiday	Pooja Bhatt	Hindi		Associate Re-recording mixer
2006	Rang De Basanti	Anubhav Sinha	Hindi		Assistant Re-recording mixer
2006	Tathastu	Rakeysh Omprakash Mehra	Hindi		Assistant Re-recording mixer
2005	Bluffmaster!	Rohan Sippy	Hindi		Sound Editor
2005	Ek Ajnabee	Apoorva Lakhia	Hindi		Associate Re-recording Mixer
2005	Kalyug	Mohit Suri	Hindi		Associate Re-recording Mixer
2005	Ek Khiladi Ek Haseena	Suparn Verma	Hindi		Associate Re-recording Mixer
2005	Being Cyrus	Homi Adajania	English		Version Re-recording Mixer
2005	The Legend of Zorro	Martin Campbell	English		Version Re-recording Mixer
2005	The Blue Umbrella	Vishal Bhardwaj	Hindi		Associate Re-recording Mixer
2005	Main, Meri Patni Aur Woh	Chandan Arora	Hindi		Additional Re-recording Mixer
2005	Mangal Pandey	Ketan Mehta	Hindi		Assistant Sound Mix Engineer
2005	Dus	Anubhav Sinha	Hindi		Associate Re-Recording Mixer
2005	Fareb	Deepak Tijori	Hindi		Associate Re-Recording Mixer
2005	Jo Bole So Nihaal	Rahul Rawail	Hindi		Associate Re-Recording Mixer
2005	Netaji	Shyam Benegal	Hindi		Assistant Sound Mix Engineer
2005	XXX: State of the Union	Lee Tamahori	Hindi		Version Re-Recording Mixer
2005	My Brother…Nikhil	Onir	Hindi		Associate Re-Recording Mixer
2005	Zeher	Mohit Suri	Hindi		Associate Re-Recording Mixer
2005	Tango Charlie	Mani Shankar	Hindi		Associate Re-Recording Mixer
2005	Karam	Sanjay F Gupta	Hindi		Associate Re-Recording Mixer
2005	Zameer: The Fire Within	Kamal	Hindi		Associate Re-Recording Mixer
2005	Rog	Himanshu Brahmbhatt	Hindi		Associate Re-Recording Mixer
2004	Charas: A Joint Operation	Tigmanshu Dhulia	Hindi		Associate Re-Recording Mixer
2004	Dil Bechara Pyaar Ka Maara	Onkar Nath Mishra	Hindi		Associate Re-Recording Mixer
2004	Dil Maange More	Anant Mahadevan	Hindi		Associate Re-Recording Mixer
2004	Swades	Ashutosh Gowariker	Hindi		Assistant Sound Mix Engineer
2004	American Daylight	Roger Christian	Hindi		Re-Recording Mixer
2004	Let's Enjoy	Ankur Tewari & Siddharth Anand Kumar	Hindi		Re-Recording Mixer
2004	Popcorn Khao! Mast Ho Jao	Kabir Sadanand	Hindi		Associate Re-Recording Mixer
2004	Kyun! Ho Gaya Na...	Samir Karnik	Hindi		Associate Re-Recording Mixer
2004	Raincoat	Rituparno Ghosh	Hindi		Associate Re-Recording Mixer
2004	Dev	Govind Nihalani	Hindi		Associate Re-Recording Mixer
2004	Harry Potter and the Prisoner of Azkaban	Alfonso Cuarón	English		Version Re-Recording Mixer
2004	Saatchya Aat Gharat	Sanjay Surkar	Marathi		Re-Recording Mixer
2004	Run	Jeeva	Hindi		Associate Re-Recording Mixer
2004	Shaadi Ka Laddoo	Raj Kaushal	Hindi		Associate Re-Recording Mixer
2004	Hellboy	Guillermo del Toro	English		Version Re-Recording Mixer
2004	Khakee	Rajkumar Santoshi	Hindi		Re-Recording Mixer
2004	Ek Hasina Thi	Sriram Raghavan	Hindi		Associate Re-Recording Mixer
2004	Aga Bai Arrecha!	Kedar Shinde	Marathi		Re-Recording Mixer
2004	Pachhadlela	Sajid Sheikh & Mahesh Kothare	Marathi		Re-Recording Mixer
2003	Chameli	Sudhir Mishra & Anant Balani	Hindi		Associate Re-Recording Mixer
2003	Paap	Pooja Bhatt	Hindi		Associate Re-Recording Mixer
2003	Tehzeeb	Khalid Mohammed	Hindi		Associate Re-Recording Mixer
