= Tholvi F.C. =

2023 Malayalam film by George Kora

- Theatrical release poster
- Directed by: George Kora
- Written by: George Kora
- Produced by: Abraham Joseph
- Starring: Sharaf U Dheen; Johny Antony
- Cinematography: Syamaprakash M. S.
- Edited by: Lal Krishna
- Music by: Vishnu Varma; Karthik Krishnan; Sijin Thomas
- Production company: Nationwide Pictures
- Distributed by: Central Pictures
- Release date: 3 November 2023
- Running time: 120 minutes
- Country: India
- Language: Malayalam

Tholvi F.C. (transl. Losers F.C.) is a 2023 Indian Malayalam-language comedy-drama film written and directed by George Kora. The film stars Sharaf U Dheen, Johny Antony, George Kora, Asha Madathil Sreekanth and Meenakshi Raveendran. In the film, Kuruvila, his wife, and their children try to succeed in life by doing something on their own.

Principal photography commenced in August 2022 in Thrikkakkara and wrapped up in September 2022. The songs were composed by Vishnu Varma, Karthik Krishnan and Sijin Thomas, while the cinematography and editing were handled by Syamaprakash M. S. and Lal Krishna.

Tholvi F.C. was released in theatres on 3 November 2023, was a box-office bomb, and received mixed reviews from critics.

== Premise ==
Kuruvila is interested in making profit by investing in cryptocurrency. His elder son, Oommen, quits his IT job in Bangalore to start his own venture called Chai Nation. Thampi is Kuruvila's younger son. He manages a children's football club called Thambi FC in Kadavanthra, which has lost every game it has played. Shoshamma, Kurivila's wife, wishes to become a writer of thriller stories.

== Cast ==
- Sharaf U Dheen as Oommen
- Johny Antony as Kuruvila
- George Kora as Thambi
- Althaf Salim as Althaf
- Asha Madathil Sreekanth as Shoshamma
- Meenakshi Raveendran as Maryam
- Amith Mohan Rajeshwari as Nirmal
- Joemon Jyothir as Wannabe Filmmaker
- Anuraj O. B. as Abu
- Poonam Gurung as Sharmin
- Ashlee Issac Abraham as Bhoskar
- Srikanth Mohan as Baby
- Abraham Joseph as Feroz
- Anju Abraham as Shahana
- Ayden Abraham as Ayden
- Humble Musician

== Production ==
The film marks the second directorial of George Kora after his debut film Thirike (2021). George, who co-wrote Njandukalude Nattil Oridavela (2017) with Althaf Salim, has also written the film's script. After his first collaboration with George Kora in Thirike, Abraham Joseph produced the film under the banner Nationwide Pictures. Syamaprakash M. S. and Lal Krishna were recruited as the cinematographer and editor. In an interview with The New Indian Express, George stated that he always intended to do a film with Sharaf U Dheen. Principal photography began on 17 August 2022 at Bharata Mata College with a customary puja ceremony and switch-on. Kakkanad was the main filming location. The shooting wrapped up in September 2022.

== Music ==
The film has songs composed by Vishnu Varma, Karthik Krishnan and Sijin Thomas. Sibi Mathew Alex provided the background score. The audio rights were obtained by Think Music. The first song "The Tholvi Song" was sung, written and composed by Karthik Krishnan. Released on 4 October 2023, It is a rap song about finding happiness in the middle of failure, with words in both English and Malayalam. The second song "Hey Nin Punchiri" was released on 18 October 2023. It was composed by Vishnu Varma, sung by Vineeth Sreenivasan and written by Vinayak Sasikumar. The third song "Pathiye" was released on 31 October 2023, composed by Sijin Thomas, written by Rijin Devasia and sung by Sijin Thomas and Sooraj Santhosh.

Track listing
No.	Title	Lyrics	Singer(s)	Length
1.	"The Tholvi Song"	Karthik Krishnan	Karthik Krishnan	2:17
2.	"Hey Nin Punchiri"	Vinayak Sasikumar	Vineeth Sreenivasan	3:37
3.	"Pathiye"	Rijin Devasia	Sijin Thomas, Sooraj Santhosh	3:46
Total length:				9:40

== Release ==
The film was released in theatres on 3 November 2023. It was distributed by Central Pictures.

== Reception ==
=== Critical response ===
Tholvi F.C. received mixed reviews from critics.

Saraswathy Nagarajan of The Hindu wrote "Tholvi FC takes on several threads, all with the best intentions, but the fabric of the narrative does not live up to expectations." Arjun Menon of Film Companion wrote "The innate corniness in the writing holds back the film and its well-meaning intentions." Sajin Shrijith of Cinema Express wrote "Tholvi FC reminds you that sometimes it's better to endure a long wait to accept what is truly right for you."
