= Kiran Das =

Indian film editor

- Born: 1 June 1983 (age 43); Muvattupuzha, Ernakulam, Kerala, India
- Education: SSM College Of Engineering, Komarapalayam; Sree Sankara Vidyapeetom College, Valayanchirangara; Nirmala Higher Secondary School, Muvattupuzha
- Occupation: Film editor
- Years active: 2014–present
- Spouse: Divya Kiran
- Children: 2
- Parents: Ravindradas M. U.; Thulasy Das
- Awards: Kerala State Film Award for Best Editor (2019)

Kiran Das (born 1 June 1983) is an Indian film editor who predominantly works in Malayalam cinema. He is a recipient of the Kerala State Film Award for Best Editor in 2019 for the movie Ishq. His other notable works include Thondimuthalum Driksakshiyum (2017), Joseph (2018), Ambili (2019) and Joji (2021).

== Filmography ==
Key
†	Denotes films that have not yet been released

=== As an editor ===
Year	Title	Director	Notes
2016	Pa Va	Sooraj Tom	
2017	Thondimuthalum Driksakshiyum	Dileesh Pothan	
2018	Joseph	M. Padmakumar	
2018	Samaksham	Anwar Abdulla, Aju K. Narayanan	
2019	Ishq	Anuraj Manohar	
2019	Ambili	Johnpaul George	
2019	Moothon	Geetu Mohandas	
2021	Joji	Dileesh Pothan	
2021	Krishnankutty Pani Thudangi	Sooraj Tom	
2021	Jan.E.Man	Chidambaram S Poduval	
2022	Kudukku 2025	Bilahari	
2022	Prappeda	Krishnendu Kalesh	
2022	Appan	Maju	
2022	Ela Veezha Poonchira	Shahi Kabir	
2022	Upacharapoorvam Gunda Jayan	Arun Vaiga	
2022	Palthu Janwar	Sangeeth P Rajan	
2022	Rorschach	Nisam Basheer	
2022	Oh Meri Laila	Abhishek KS	
2023	Thankam	Saheed Arafath	
2023	Romancham	Jithu Madhavan	
2023	Sesham Mike-il Fathima	Manu C. Kumar	
2024	Panchavalsara Padhathi	P G Premlal	
2024	Jananam: 1947 Pranayam Thudarunnu	Abijith Asokan	
2024	Ullozhukku	Christo Tomy	
2024	Thekku Vadakku	Prem Sankar	
2025	Painkili	Sreejith Babu	
2025	Lovely	Dileesh Nair	
2025	Moonwalk	Vinod AK	
2025	Mindiyum Paranjum	Arun Bose	
2026	Aashaan	Johnpaul George	

=== As a director ===
Year	Title	Notes
2026	Unmadham	

== Awards ==
Year	Film	Award	Category	Notes
2019	Ishq	Kerala State Film Awards	Best Editor	
2017	Thondimuthalum Driksakshiyum	Asianet Film Awards	Best Editing	
2017	Thondimuthalum Driksakshiyum	CPC Cine Awards 2017	Best Editor	
