= Janaki Jaane =

- Theatrical release poster
- Directed by: Aneesh Upasana
- Written by: Aneesh Upasana; Anil Narayanan; Rohan Raj
- Produced by: Shenuga; Shegna; Sherga
- Starring: Navya Nair; Saiju Kurup
- Cinematography: Syamaprakash ms
- Edited by: Noufal Abdulla
- Music by: Kailas Menon; Sibi Mathew Alex
- Production company: SCube Films
- Distributed by: Kalpaka Release
- Release date: 12 May 2023
- Running time: 122 minutes
- Country: India
- Language: Malayalam

Janaki Jaane is a 2023 Indian Malayalam-language comedy drama film written and directed by Aneesh Upasana. The film features an ensemble cast including Navya Nair in the title role along with Saiju Kurup, Sharaf U Dheen, Anarkali Marikar, Johny Antony, Kottayam Nazeer, George Kora, Sminu Sijo, Pramod Veliyanadu and James Eliy among others. Upon release, it received mixed reviews.

== Plot ==
Janaki marries Unni Mukundan (Saiju Kurup), a subcontractor doing road works at the panchayat level. When the power goes off during their wedding reception, a scared Janaki goes to her husband to feel secure. But when the power gets restored, she is seen hugging a young politician Martin (Sarjano Khalid), by mistake, who stands near her husband. This instance is photographed by the rival party members of Martin who is contesting for his constituency by-elections. This image goes viral on social media and the rival political party takes advantage of the situation. The news report of these photographs, aimed at tarnishing the image of Martin, gets flashed on news channels. Janaki and Unni initially handle the situation. But later, they are forced to leave their house as the media starts discussing the news in prime time. How the couple faces the issues and how Janaki, a vulnerable woman, overcomes these critical situations form the crux of the movie.

== Cast ==
- Navya Nair as Janaki
- Saiju Kurup as Unni Mukundan
- Dhyan Sreenivasan as Lishan
- Sharaf U Dheen as Manu Bhaskar
- Anarkali Marikar as Maria
- Kottayam Nazeer as P. R. Shaji
- Johny Antony as Suku
- George Kora as Martin
- Sminu Sijo as Satyabhama
- Pramod Veliyanadu as Johnny
- James Eliya as Kariyachan
- Jordi Poonjar as Divakaran
- Vidhya Vijayakumar as Treesa
- Anjali Satyanath as Sofiya
- Sathi Premji as Lakshmi
- Sylaja Sreedharan Nair as Devu
- Anwar Shereef as Jo
- Shamnas M Ashraf as Shafi
- Deepa Kartha as Ramla
- Nitha as Dhanya
- Mayoon as Nandhan
- Vishnu Prasad as Jomon
- Swami as Saji
- Shabin T. V. as YouTuber Manja Prasad
- T. K. Kabir as Mukundan
- P. L. Chacko as Bhaskaran
- Aneesh Upasana as News Reader
- Hitha Hareesh as Rini Alex

== Production ==
=== Filming ===
The principal photography began on 10 November 2022. The team began shooting for the film at Karalam after the pooja ceremony. Shooting took place for a month in Karalam, Irinjalakuda, and Kodungallur. The principal photography wrapped on 17 December 2022.

=== Marketing ===
The first-look poster of the film was released in January 2023. The film got "U" censored from Central Board of Film Certification. Later, the trailer was released.

== Reception ==
=== Critical reception ===
Critics from Manorama Online and News18 gave mixed reviews. A critic from Mathrubhumi wrote that, "Ultimately the film is about how one overcomes the fear within. Dare to buy tickets to watch this story of Janaki becoming a brave woman."

Vignesh Madhu of Cinema Express wrote that Janaki Jaane is slightly problematic because the film doesn't endorse therapy or seeking medical help to overcome fears and gave 2.5 stars out of 5 Anna Mathews of The Times of India gave 2.5 out of 5 and wrote that, "So, while the movie is watchable, it doesn't offer anything special." S. R. Praveen of The Hindu wrote that, "Navya Nair does not have much of a scope to perform, while Saiju Kurup has become a tad repetitive in his recent roles. In all, Janaki Jaane fails to utilise its promising premise."

Crics of The News Minute gave 2.5 out of 5 and wrote that, "Thankfully, it is steered away before it turns too ugly."
