= Aashaan =

2026 Indian Malayalam-language comedy-drama film

- Theatrical release poster
- Directed by: Johnpaul George
- Written by: Johnpaul George
- Produced by: Johnpaul George; Annam Johnpaul; Suraj Philip Jacob
- Starring: Indrans; Joemon Jyothir; Shobi Thilakan; Madan Gowri; Bibin Perumpally; Abin Bino; Kudassanad Kanakam
- Cinematography: Vimal Jose Thachil
- Edited by: Kiran Das
- Music by: Songs: Johnpaul George; Background Score: Ajeesh Anto
- Production company: Guppy Cinemas
- Distributed by: Wayfarer Films
- Release date: 5 February 2026
- Running time: 160 minutes
- Country: India
- Language: Malayalam

Aashaan is a 2026 Indian Malayalam-language comedy drama film written and directed by Johnpaul George. The film is produced by Johnpaul George, Annam Johnpaul and Suraj Philip Jacob under the banner of Guppy Cinemas. It stars veteran actor Indrans in the titular role alongside Joemon Jyothir, Shobi Thilakan, Madan Gowri, Bibin Perumpally, Abin Bino and Kudassanad Kanakam.

== Plot ==
Aashaan is a meta comedy-drama that follows an ageing filmmaker who decides to pursue one final cinematic dream after a series of personal and professional setbacks. The narrative unfolds as a film-within-a-film, blending humour and emotion while celebrating the spirit of creativity and filmmaking.

== Cast ==
- Indrans as Aashaan aka Marlon Brando
- Joemon Jyothir as Anantharaman
- Shobi Thilakan as Director KRS
- Madan Gowri as Vinod
- Bibin Perumpally as Superstar Karan Chand
- Abin Bino as Ambadi
- Kudassanad Kanakam as Violet

== Production ==
The film was officially announced in 2025. Director Johnpaul George, known for his earlier films Guppy and Ambili, also composed the songs for the film, marking his debut as a music composer. The background score was composed by Ajeesh Anto, with cinematography by Vimal Jose Thachil and editing by Kiran Das.

== Music ==
The film features songs composed by Johnpaul George with lyrics by Vinayak Sasikumar, while the background score was composed by Ajeesh Anto. The song "Mayila Cinemayila" gained popularity on social media platforms ahead of the film's release.

Track listing
No.	Title	Lyrics	Singer(s)	Length
1.	"Kunjikkavil Meghame"	Vinayak Sasikumar	Sooraj Santhosh	04:44
2.	"Chirake Chirake"	Vinayak Sasikumar	Johnpaul George & Indrans	06:02
3.	"Nirangal Aayirangal"	Vinayak Sasikumar	S.P. Charan & Avirbhav	03:12
4.	"Chinnambal Kurunne"	Vinayak Sasikumar	M.G. Sreekumar	04:37
5.	"Mayila Cinemayile"	Vinayak Sasikumar & mcrzl	mcrzl, Milan Joy, Soorya Shyam Gopal, Bharath Sajikumar & Amal C Ajith	03:22
6.	"Kunjikkavil Meghame (Reprise)"	Vinayak Sasikumar	Sooraj Santhosh	02:07
Total length:				24:04

== Release and reception ==
Aashaan was released theatrically on 5 February 2026, with distribution in Kerala handled by Wayfarer Films.
