= Sarasa Balussery =

Indian actress

- Born: Sarasa Balussery; Balussery
- Occupation: Actor
- Years active: 1985–present

Sarasa Balussery is a stage actress in Kerala and a film actress in Malayalam cinema. Her films include Sudani from Nigeria (2018), Virus (2019), Thirike (2021) and Dakini (2018).

She became more popular after being cast in the 2018 Malayalam film Sudani from Nigeria, which was successful and her performance received various awards.

== Personal life ==
Sarasa has acted for five decades on the Malayalam stage. Her association was with Kozhikode based drama theaters such as Kalinga, Sangamam, Stage Inda, Chiranthana and she performed in numerous plays. Three decades ago she was cast in the Malayalam film Uyarum Njan Nadake, which was an early Mohanlal film, as the mother role.

== Filmography ==
Year	Title	Role	Notes
1985	Uyarum Njan Nadake	Darappan's mother	
2018	Sudani from Nigeria	Beeyumma	
2018	Dakini	Saroja	
2019	IDDAH: The God's Decision	Asyumma	Short film
2019	Allu Ramendran	Jithu's grandmother	
2019	Virus	Khadeeja	
2019	Kakshi: Amminippilla	Pradeepan's mother	
2019	Subharathri	Moothumma	
2019	Porinju Mariam Jose	Rosili	
2019	Ittymaani: Made in China	Inmate at old age home	
2019	Pranaya Meenukalude Kadal	Ayisha	
2019	Ulta	Jyothisharatnam Eashwariyamma	
2019	Edakkad Battalion 06	Thithummachi	
2020	Praanan - Short film	Johnson's mother	
2020	Citizen Number '21	Muslim lady	Musical video
2021	Thirike	Sosama Ammachi	
2021	Vaanku	Razia's grandmother	
2021	Star	Ardra's grandmother	
2022	Nna Thaan Case Kodu		
2022	Peace		
2022	Padachone Ingalu Katholee!		
2022	Aanapparambile World Cup	Ummumma	
2023	Pookkaalam	Alamma	
2023	Sesham Mike-il Fathima	Valiyumma	
2024	Qalb	Asura Aunty	
2025	Narayaneente Moonnaanmakkal	Devaki	
2025	Theatre †	TBA	

== TV serials ==
- Swapnamoru Chakku (Flowers TV)

== Awards and achievements ==
- 2019 Best Character Actress shared with Savithri Shreedharan at the 49th Kerala State Film Awards
- 2019 Best supporting Actress shared with Savithri Shreedharan at the 21st Asianet Film Awards
