= Johnpaul George =

Indian script writer and film director

- Born: 14 February
- Education: Swathi Thirunal College of Music
- Occupations: Film Director; Screenwriter; Film Producer
- Years active: 2011–present
- Spouse: Annam Johnpaul (m. 2022)
- Children: yes

Johnpaul George is an Indian script writer, film director and Film Producer active in the Malayalam film industry. He is best known for his debut film Guppy, which was released in August 2016.

== Film career ==
He started his film career as a chief assistant director in the 2011 Rajesh Pillai–directed movie Traffic. Later, he was the associate director for Sameer Thahir in the following movies: Chaappa Kurishu, 5 Sundarikal, and Neelakasham Pachakadal Chuvanna Bhoomi. He also worked as the production partner of E4 Entertainment from 2013 to 2016. He made his directorial movie debut through the Malayalam movie Guppy, which was released in August 2016. His second Malayalam film Ambili was released on 2019. He is also the producer of Romancham, which was released in February 2023.

== Awards ==
- Best Debutant Director – South Indian International Movie Award (SIIMA) 2017
- Best Debutant Producer – South Indian International Movie Award (SIIMA) 2024

== Filmography ==
=== As director ===
Year	Title	Credited as		Cast	Notes
Year	Title	Director	Writer	Cast	Notes
2016	Guppy	Yes	Yes	Chethan Jayalal, Tovino Thomas, Sreenivasan	Debut film
2019	Ambili	Yes	Yes	Soubin Shahir, Tanvi Ram, Naveen Nazim	
2026	Aashaan	Yes	Yes	Indrans, Joemon Jyothir, Shobi Thilakan	

=== As associate director ===
Year	Title	Notes
2011	Chaappa Kurishu	Associate Director
2013	5 Sundarikal	Associate Director
2013	Neelakasham Pachakadal Chuvanna Bhoomi	Associate Director

=== As Chief Assistant Director ===
Year	Title	Notes
2011	Traffic	Chief Assistant Director

=== As producer ===
Year	Title	Notes
2023	Romancham	Produced by Johnpaul George and Girish Gangadharan
