= Tanvi Ram =

Indian actor

- Born: Shruthi Ram; Kannur, Kerala, India
- Occupation: Actress
- Years active: 2019–present

Shruthi Ram, known by her stage name Tanvi Ram, is an Indian actress who works primarily in Malayalam cinema apart from a few Telugu films. She was a Miss Kerala 2012 Finalist. She is best known for her roles in Ambili (2019) and 2018 (2023).

== Career ==
Born in Kannur, Tanvi started her career as a banking professional in Bengaluru for seven years before she turned her focus towards acting. She landed her first role in the film Ambili (2019) alongside Soubin Shahir. She next acted in the film Kappela (2020).

She made her debut in Telugu cinema opposite Nani in the film Ante Sundaraniki. She portrayed a significant role in the film 2018 (2023) which became an all-time blockbuster.

She also played lead role in Abhilasham (2025) alongside Saiju Kurup. She also play Radha in the 2024 Telugu film KA opposite Kiran Abbavaram.

== Filmography ==
Key
†	Denotes films that have not yet been released

Year	Title	Role	Language	Notes	Ref
2019	Ambili	Teena Kurian	Malayalam		
2020	Kappela	Annie	Malayalam		
2022	Ante Sundaraniki	Pushpa Thomas	Telugu		
2022	Aaraattu	Commissioner's daughter	Malayalam	Cameo appearance	
2022	Thallumaala	Treesa Reji	Malayalam		
2022	Kumari	Nangakutty	Malayalam		
2022	Mukundan Unni Associates	Adv. Jyothi Lakshmi	Malayalam		
2023	Enkilum Chandrike	Sujina	Malayalam		
2023	Khali Purse of Billionaires	Nidhi	Malayalam		
2023	2018	Manju	Malayalam		
2024	KA	Radha	Telugu		
2025	Aap Kaise Ho	Nirmala	Malayalam		
2025	Abhilasham	Sherin Moosa	Malayalam		
2025	Param Sundari	Parvathy	Hindi		
2026	Shankarabharanna	Jenny	Kannada		
