= Abhilasham =

Indian Malayalam language film

- Theatrical release poster
- Directed by: Shamzu Zayba
- Written by: Jenith Kachappilly
- Produced by: Ann Sariga Antony; Shankar Das
- Starring: Saiju Kurup; Arjun Ashokan; Tanvi Ram
- Cinematography: Sajad Kaakku
- Edited by: Nimz
- Music by: Sreehari K Nair
- Production company: Second Show Productions
- Distributed by: Second Show Productions; Phars Film
- Release date: 29 March 2025
- Country: India
- Language: Malayalam

Abhilasham is a 2025 Indian Malayalam language film directed by Shamzu Zayba and written by Jenith Kachappilly featuring Saiju Kurup, Arjun Ashokan and Tanvi Ram in lead roles.

== Plot ==
Two childhood friends separated by time and unspoken feelings reunite in their hometown. Abhilash sees a second chance with Sherin, but the past casts a long shadow over their present.

== Cast ==
- Saiju Kurup as Abhilash Kumar
  - Vasudev Sajeesh as young Abhilash Kumar
- Arjun Ashokan as Thaju
- Tanvi Ram as Sherin Moosa
  - Nimna Fathoomi as young Sherin Moosa
- Navas Vallikkunnu as Adv Ajesh Alappat
  - Adhish Praveen as young Ajesh
- Arjun Ashokan as Thaju
- Uma K.P. as Radha, Abhilash's mother
- Neeraja Rajendran as Sherin's Mother
- Sheethal Zackaria as Suhara
- Ajisha Prabhakaran as Rasiya
- Zhinz Shan as School Headmaster
- Nandana Rajan as Megha Mohan
- Binu Pappu as Pachikka (Extended Cameo Role)
- Shine Tom Chacko as Zulfiqer (Cameo)

== Reception ==
=== Critical reception ===
Vivek Santhosh of Cinema Express rated the film 2/5 stars and wrote, "Despite Saiju Kurup and Tanvi Ram’s sincerity, the film fails to elevate its tired premise, reducing deep-rooted affection to a series of forced moments."

Divya P. of OTTplay rated the film 2.5/5 stars and wrote, "A charming Saiju Kurup takes us back to old-school romance but it might not be for the best."

== Controversies ==
In February 2026, the Kochi City Police registered a case alleging cheating and fraud in connection with the production of Abhilasham. The complaint was filed by one of the film's producers, Ann Sariga Antony, who alleged that certain crew members and a distribution firm misrepresented the film's production budget, resulting in financial losses of approximately ₹4 crore.

According to the complaint, an agreement executed in July 2023 estimated the production cost at ₹2.25 crore, but the actual expenditure allegedly rose to around ₹3.25 crore due to delays and additional expenses. The complainant also alleged improper handling of post-production materials, including the unauthorised transfer of the final master copy of the film to a third party without consent. Five individuals, including an associate director and representatives of the distribution firm, were named in the case.
