= Allu Ramendran =

2019 Indian Malayalam-language film

- First-look poster
- Directed by: Bilahari
- Written by: Sajin Cherukayil; Vineeth Vasudevan; Girish A.D
- Produced by: Ashiq Usman
- Starring: Kunchacko Boban; Chandini Sreedharan; Krishna Shankar; Aparna Balamurali
- Cinematography: Jimshi Khalid
- Edited by: Lijo Paul
- Music by: Shaan Rahman
- Production company: Ashiq Usman Productions
- Distributed by: Central Pictures
- Release date: 1 February 2019
- Running time: 135 minutes
- Country: India
- Language: Malayalam

Allu Ramendran (transl. Nail Ramendran) is a 2019 Indian Malayalam-language comedy thriller film directed by Bilahari and starring Kunchako Boban in the title role, while Chandini Sreedharan, Aparna Balamurali and Krishna Shankar play the supporting roles. The screenplay was written by Sajin Cherukayil, Vineeth Vasudevan, and Girish A. D., the film was produced by Ashiq Usman. Shaan Rahman composed the music. The film was released in India on 1 February 2019.

== Plot ==
Police driver Ramendran leads a typical life with his wife Viji, his father and sister Swathi. His jeep always gets a puncture with nails and is baffled as this happens only to him, but doesn't occur if anyone else is driving the vehicle. He is now on a quest to find out who puts the nails (allu) in his path, earning him the nickname Allu Ramendran.

One day while inspecting a puncture on the roadside he sees and almost catches the person who put the nails, but misses. After the scuffle Ramendran finds his wallet with a childhood photo in it but couldn't identify him. Due to all these mishaps, Ramendran is forced to go on leave. Meanwhile, his sister Swathi is in love with a young man named Jithu who is unemployed and is hopeful of an upcoming interview to Dubai. Jithu could not land the job as well seems to be shocked to realize Ramendran is Swathi's brother, which he was not aware till now. As the family starts to look for a suitable groom for Swathi, they plot a plan and ask Jithu to come home with the proposal as if in an arranged marriage.

Everything goes well until Swathi's family visit Jithu's home and Ramendran finds old photos of him. Ramendran confronts Jithu, and he confesses that he was the culprit. On the day of his interview, Jithu had parked the bike in front of a tea shop, and Ramendran while chasing a runaway accused Amruthesh, had taken his bike, and in the heat of the moment leave it on the roadside, fallen. All of his certificates were soiled and hence to take revenge started to keep spikes for Ramendran's vehicle. Ramendran makes Jithu do many petty things like making two self-goals in the local football tournament, beg on the street etc., if Jithu wants to marry Swathi. Jithu does everything but at last Ramendran would still won't say yes to their marriage.

Ramendran now happy that his spike (Allu) nightmares are over rejoins his job, and on the first day while transporting a gun to the court gets a spike again. Alarmed, he and a fellow policeman will spot a person and chase him while the custodial gun gets stolen from the jeep. Ramendran is again on suspension and believes that Jithu has done this. During a local event, he spots Amruthesh, (he had relocated to Bangalore after the initial scuffle) and while following him is attacked by his goons. Jithu comes to save Ramendran and the lost gun is found with Amruthesh.

In the end, Ramedran begrudgingly allows Jithu to marry Swathi, but still feels sour about the events. When Ramendran mentions that Jithu put spikes on the road 35 times, Jithu reveals that he only did it 18 times, having stopped his revenge after learning Ramendran was Swathi's brother. As everyone tries to guess who put all the remaining spikes, their car is hit by another hidden spike. Ramendran sees the real culprit, his face covered, and angrilly chases after him, while Jithu runs behind to help him, after Swathi warns him that he'll be blamed for this spike if he doesn't help.

== Cast ==
- Kunchacko Boban as CPO Ramachandran T.G ("Allu" Ramendran)
- Krishna Shankar as Jithu, Swathi's love interest
- Chandini Sreedharan as Viji, Ramendran's wife
- Aparna Balamurali as Swathi, Ramendran's sister and Jithu's love interest turned wife
- Dharmajan Bolgatty as Ayyappadas
- Hareesh Kanaran as Coach Vijayan
- Salim Kumar as SI Sinto Simon
- Sreenath Bhasi as Amruthesh
- Assim Jamal as Sathyan, Viji's brother and Ramendran's brother-in-law
- Sarasa Balussery as Jithu's grandmother
- Althaf Salim as Driver
- Krishna Prabha as CPO Rani
- Rajesh Paravoor as Varghese
- Neeraj Madhav in a cameo appearance in song
- Nadirshah in a cameo appearance

== Soundtrack ==
The songs and score was composed by Shaan Rahman. Soundtrack was released by the label Muzik 247 on 18 February 2018.

All lyrics are written by Harinarayanan.

No.	Title	Writer(s)	Singer(s)	Length
1.	"Aarum Kaanaathe"	B.K.Harinarayanan	Adheef Mohammad	4:06
2.	"Mele Kaavil"	B.K.Harinarayanan	Vineeth Sreenivasan	3:24
3.	"Ethaatha Kombaanada"	B.K.Harinarayanan	Shaan Rahman	3:29
4.	"Puncture"	B.K.Harinarayanan	Shaan Rahman	2:04
Total length:				13:03

== Release ==
The film was released in India on 1 February 2019.

=== Critical reception ===
The Times of India rated the film 3 out of 5 stars and stated "The film is a good time-pass comedy, a wholesome family entertainer". The Deccan Chronicle considered the film to be "A throughout entertainer which won't disappoint you" and rated the film 3 out of 5 stars. Malayala Manorama rated the film 3.5 out of 5 stars, saying "It is a tale with romance, comedy, suspense, action, drama, many flat tires and a hell of a lot of fun". Filmibeat rated the film 3.5 out of 5 stars and said that "with a thin-yet-interesting storyline and fresh narration, Allu Ramendran does join the league of well-crafted entertainers".
