= Guppy (film) =

- Theatrical-release poster
- Directed by: Johnpaul George
- Written by: Johnpaul George
- Produced by: Mukesh R. Mehta; A. V. Anoop; C. V. Sarathi
- Starring: Chethan Jayalal; Tovino Thomas; Sreenivasan
- Cinematography: Girish Gangadharan
- Edited by: Dilip Dennis
- Music by: Vishnu Vijay
- Production companies: E4 Entertainment; A. V. A. Productions; Yopa Cinemas
- Distributed by: E4 Entertainment
- Release date: 5 August 2016
- Country: India
- Language: Malayalam
- Budget: ₹3.10 crores

Guppy is a 2016 Indian Malayalam-language drama film written and directed by Johnpaul George (in his directorial debut). It stars Chethan Jayalal and Tovino Thomas in the lead roles, along with Sreenivasan, Rohini, Sudheer Karamana, Dileesh Pothan, and Alencier Ley Lopez in supporting roles. The film was released on 5 August 2016 to positive reviews, but had a moderate performance in the box office.

The film revolves around the unexpected rivalry that starts between a teenager, Guppy and the engineer who comes for the construction of the village dream project. Centered on the theme of hope.

== Plot ==
Michael, better known as Guppy, is a schoolboy and talented artist who supports his disabled mother by breeding and selling ornamental fish. He dreams of buying her a motorized wheelchair someday. His life is filled with the mischief of his friends and the charm of Amina, a village girl living with her grandparents. Meanwhile, the government sanctions the construction of a railway over-bridge, creating excitement in the village.

The project engineer, Thejus Varkey, arrives by motorcycle from the Himalayas. At their first meeting, Guppy offends him while serving tea, leading to mutual resentment. A near accident gives Guppy and his gang an excuse to demand money from Thejus, worsening their relationship. When Thejus pressures the village officer to cut the payment for Guppy’s fish, the boy retaliates by vandalizing his jeep. The confrontation escalates when Thejus slaps Guppy, who in turn injures the engineer’s hand with a stone. Later, the team’s tent is mysteriously burned, leaving Thejus to continue the work alone.

Studying the canals, Thejus arranges for the demolition of Guppy’s fish tanks and roadside stall, citing illegal construction. This destroys the boy’s livelihood. In desperation, Guppy hires a thug to harm the engineer, but Thejus is stabbed, horrifying the boy. Although fearful of retaliation, Guppy learns that the real attacker was Amina’s grandfather, Uppooppa, the railway gate operator who faced losing his job once the bridge was built. Stricken with guilt, Uppooppa is hospitalized.

Recovering, Thejus realizes his presence has devastated both Guppy and Uppooppa’s families. He concludes that the bridge is politically motivated and technically unfeasible, and cancels the project. Seeking reconciliation, he forgives Uppooppa, promises to help with Amina’s education, and rebuilds Guppy’s fish tanks. Guppy, overjoyed, rushes to tell his mother, only to find she has died, with the long-awaited wheelchair still on its way.

Later, an elderly villager named Tinku reveals Thejus’s past: years earlier, while inaugurating the Omallur Bridge, Thejus lost his parents, wife, and young daughter Malu in an accident. Riding became his way of coping with grief, and he saw every child he met as Malu. The railway over-bridge project was his only major work since.

In the final sequence, Thejus is seen riding through the Himalayas along with Guppy as his companion, both of them having found peace in their lives.

== Cast ==
- Chethan Jayalal as Michael / Guppy
- Tovino Thomas as Engineer Thejus Varkey
- Sreenivasan as Upooppa
- Rohini as Guppy's mother
- Nandhana Varma as Aamina
- Vijilesh Karayad as Pappoy
- Karthik Vishnu as Christy
- Arun Paul as Abu
- Sarath Jayan as Jaffer
- Alencier Ley Lopez as Paappan
- Sudheer Karamana as Lalichan
- Dileesh Pothan as Krishnan, village officer
- Sudhi Koppa as Chink Divakar
- Pauly Valsan as Molly
- Noby as Oanachan
- K. L. Antony Kochi as Tinku
- Poojappura Ravi as Chinnappan
- Devi Ajith as Aamina's grandmother
- Anand Bal as Police Inspector

== Production ==
The film is jointly produced by E4 Entertainment and A. V. A. Productions, in association with Yopa Cinemas.

== Soundtrack ==
Guppy

Soundtrack album by Vishnu Vijay
- Released: 2016
- Recorded: 2016
- Genre: Feature film soundtrack
- Length: 16:58
- Language: Malayalam
- Label: E4 Entertainment

Vishnu Vijay chronology
Guppy (2016)	2019 (2019)

The soundtrack features songs composed by Vishnu Vijay. The lyrics were penned by Vinayak Sasikumar, Rafeeq Ahamed and Johnpaul George. The background score was also produced by Vishnu Vijay and orchestrated by Sushin Shyam.

Tracklist
No.	Title	Writer(s)	Singer(s)	Length
1.	"Gabrielinte"	Vinayak Sasikumar	Anthony Daasan	3:35
2.	"Athiraliyum"	Rafeeq Ahmed	Vijay Yesudas, Lathika	4:10
3.	"Virinja Poonkurunne"	Vinayak Sasikumar	Vishnu Vijay	1:18
4.	"Thaniye"	Vinayak Sasikumar	Sooraj Santhosh	4:57
5.	"Thira Thira"		Madhuvanthi Narayan, Suchith Suresan, Vijayan Ambalapuzha	3:38
Total length:				16:58

== Release ==
Guppy was originally scheduled to release on 29 July 2016, but due to some procedural issue in getting the film censored, the release was postponed to and released on 5 August 2016. The film was released in 72 theaters across Kerala.

== Critical reception ==
The film received positive reviews from critics.

Times of India gave a rating of 3/5 and mentioned that director and scriptwriter Johnpaul George deserves credit for weaving the beautiful tale

The Hindu mentioned that in Guppy director Johnpaul George is visibly eager to bring on screen everything he ever wanted to shoot and ends up packing in just a little too much.'

Malayala Manorama gave a rating of 3/5 and said that 'While it's a thumbs up for the maiden directorial venture, one is too tempted to sing 'beauty, beauty everywhere, but a good number of edits short of being a fine film'

The Entertainment website Sify described Guppy as "a good film that has its fine moments."

The power of the screenplay in getting the audience involved, choosing between sides, and later making them regret their choice is one which is worthy of mention.

== Awards ==
47th Kerala State Film Awards

The film won 5 awards for 2016 47th Kerala State Film Awards which was announced on 7 March 2017.

- Best Child Artist - Chethan Jayalal
- Best Background Music - Vishnu Vijay
- Best Male Singer - Sooraj Santhosh
- Best Costume Designer - Stephy Zaviour
- Special Mention - Girish Gangadharan

== Home media ==
Guppy garnered excellent reviews after the DVD release which prompted lead actor Tovino Thomas asking through Facebook about re-releasing the movie in theaters again. The lead actor said that after the release of the DVD, he has been receiving a lot of messages from people who regret missing out on the movie in theaters.

== See also ==
- Guppy
