= Althaf Salim =

Indian film director and actor

- Born: Kerala, India
- Occupations: Director; Actor; Writer
- Years active: 2015 - present
- Notable work: Njandukalude Nattil Oridavela

Althaf Salim is an Indian film director and actor who works in Malayalam film industry. He is known for directing Njandukalude Nattil Oridavela.

== Career ==
Althaf started his career with the film Premam as Jahangir on 2015. In 2017, Althaf directed Njandukalude Nattil Oridavela which became a huge box office success.

Althaf become best known for his role in the 2024 romantic comedy film Premalu.

== Filmography ==
=== As director ===
Year	Title	Direction	Story	Notes	Ref.
2017	Njandukalude Nattil Oridavela	Yes	Yes	Debut	
2025	Odum Kuthira Chaadum Kuthira	Yes	Yes		

=== As actor ===
Year	Title	Role	Notes	Ref.
2015	Premam	Jahangir	Debut	
2017	Sakhavu	Mahesh		
2017	Njandukalude Nattil Oridavela		Cameo	
2019	Allu Ramendran	Sudhi		
2019	Oru Adaar Love	Manikandan		
2019	Sathyam Paranja Viswasikkuvo	Sujith		
2020	Mariyam Vannu Vilakkoothi	Unnikrishnan Nambuthiri		
2021	Operation Java	Shanu		
2022	Karnan Napoleon Bhagath Singh	Soji		
2022	Makal	Solomon		
2022	Mahi			
2022	Kochaal	Pharmacist		
2022	Pyali	Inby		
2022	Mukundan Unni Associates	Suresh		
2022	Gold	Velukkutan		
2023	Pachuvum Athbutha Vilakkum	Sujith		
2023	Madhura Manohara Moham	Ambadi		
2023	Kallanum Bhagavathiyum	Enchanter's Assistant		
2023	Padmini	Siju		
2023	Jaladhara Pumpset Since 1962	Arun		
2023	Rahel Makan Kora			
2023	Tholvi F.C.	Althaf		
2023	Bullet Diaries			
2024	Premalu	Shobhi Sir		
2024	Thundu	Dr. Vidhyesh		
2024	Nadikar			
2024	Kattis Gang			
2024	Mandakini	Aromal	Debut as lead actor	
2024	Vishesham	Saji		
2024	Adios Amigo	Rony		
2024	Nunakkuzhi	Naveen		
2024	Prathibha Tutorials			
2024	Oshana			
2025	Communist Pacha Adhava Appa			
2025	Ennu Swantham Punyalan	Kapyar		
2025	Anpodu Kanmani	Rafeeque		
2025	Hridayapoorvam	Film Actor	Cameo appearance	
2025	Odum Kuthira Chaadum Kuthira		Cameo appearance	
2025	Innocent	Vinod		
2025	Sarvam Maya	Delivery Boy		
2026	Secret of Kalinga			
2026	Mollywood Times	Sunil		
2026	Pluto	Pluto		
2026	Melcow Pondicherry			
2026	Cosmic Samson †	TBA		
