= Marubhoomiyile Aana =

- Theatrical release poster
- Directed by: V. K. Prakash
- Written by: Y. V. Rajesh
- Produced by: David Kachappilly
- Starring: Biju Menon; Krishna Shankar; Lalu Alex; Samskruthy Shenoy; Balu Varghese; Hareesh Perumanna
- Cinematography: Ajay David Kachappilly
- Edited by: Lijo Paul
- Music by: Ratheesh Vega
- Production company: David Kachappilly Productions
- Distributed by: Davis Edakalathur
- Release date: 12 August 2016
- Running time: 120 minutes
- Country: India
- Language: Malayalam

Marubhoomiyile Aana (transl. Elephant of the desert) is a 2016 Indian Malayalam-language comedy film directed by V. K. Prakash. It stars Biju Menon in the role of a Qatar-born Malayali Sheikh in the Middle East. Filming locations include Qatar and Kerala. The film was released on 12 August 2016.

== Plot ==
Sughu and his family were rich and Kamalan was their steward. Sughu's father was an alcoholic, so Kamalan used that and turned over his employer's land and house in his name. Kamalan now lives a life of luxury and his cunning knack helps him to amass more wealth. Sughu is in love with Kamal's daughter Keerthi. He plans to make quick money through trafficking drugs to Qatar, a one time deal that could help him regain his family's honor and get his girl. However, matters doesn't go well, and he gets very less money compared to the amount promised.

When going back to Kerala, he gets tied up with a penniless Half-Malayali Sheikh named Sultan Hamad Bin Saud Bin Khalifa Bin Jasim Al Thani Mohammed in the airport. There is a murder case that has followed with the Sheikh from Qatar. The identity of the Sheikh, Sughu's own story of love, Kamal's greedy plans, and the murder case that has followed them to Kerala are all thick plot-lines which are explored.

== Cast ==
- Biju Menon as His Highness Sheikh Sultan Hamad Bin Saud Bin Khalifa Bin Jasim Al Thani Mohammed (Sheikh Al Ahmmadi)
- Krishna Shankar as Sukumara Menon (Suku)
- Lalu Alex as Kamalaasanan (Kamalan), Keerthy's father
- Balu Varghese as Martin, Suku's friend
- Samskruthy Shenoy as Keerthy
- Hareesh Perumanna as Satheesan, Suku's brother-in-law
- Saju Navodaya as Satheeshan, Kamal's PA
- Major Ravi as Mahesh Panicker, Qatar Vigilance officer
- Sunil Sukhada as Albert Pannadan, Bride's Rich & Affluent father
- Bindu Panicker as Pannadan's wife
- Rosin Jolly as Sukanya, Keerthy's friend
- Shafna as Bride, Pannadan's daughter
- Jennifer Antony as Deepa, Keerthy's mother
- Jayaraj Warrier as Porinju, Jewellery owner
- Arun Ghosh as Joy Cheruvarakkal, Qatar businessman turned drug dealer and a wanted criminal who gets killed by the Sheikh but later it turns out Suku killed him
- Mamukkoya as Gafoor (Cameo appearance) (Reprising the character of Nadodikkattu)
- Indira Thampi as old lady at airport
- Sneha Sreekumar
- Sajin Gopu as Suku's friend (uncredited)

== Production ==
Principal photography began in late April 2016, soon after which Samskruthy Shenoy was cast as the film's lead actress. Krishna Shankar, plays the major role in the film, which was first offered to Asif Ali. The shooting ended on 20 June 2016.

=== Animal rights issue ===
During a shooting session of the film in March 2016, a tiger, who allegedly escaped from the sets, was seen roaming through a Doha express highway. A video of the tiger's escape quickly went viral online, causing the makers of the film to face heavy backlash from social media, international news agencies, and animal rights activists. The situation cooled off only after the makers called a press release and clarified that "the big cat had escaped from its cage when it was being taken to the shooting site." The producers of the film were eventually fined for not handling the animal properly. "The video featuring a tiger appeared at Doha Express highway has gone viral on the internet and the truth is that the tiger was brought there for the shoot of film Marubhoomiyile Aana and had to pay a big penalty for the incident (sic)," the makers had posted on the Facebook page of the movie.

== Release ==
The film was released in India on 12 August 2016.
