= Enkilum Chandrike =

2023 Malayalam film

- Theatrical release poster
- Directed by: Adithyan Chandrashekar
- Written by: Arjun Narayanan; Adithyan Chandrashekar
- Produced by: Vijay Babu
- Starring: Suraj Venjaramoodu; Basil Joseph; Saiju Kurup; Tanvi Ram; Niranjana Anoop; Ashwin Vijayan
- Cinematography: Jithin Stanislaus
- Edited by: Lijo Paul
- Music by: Ifthi
- Production company: Friday Film House
- Release date: 17 February 2023
- Country: India
- Language: Malayalam

Enkilum Chandrike is a 2023 Indian Malayalam-language romantic comedy film directed by Adithyan Chandrashekar and produced by Vijay Babu under the banner of Friday Film House. It features Suraj Venjaramoodu, Basil Joseph, Saiju Kurup, Ashwin Vijayan, Niranjana Anoop and Tanvi Ram as the main leads. The film was released on 17 February 2023.

== Plot ==
Abhi, Kiran and Amal are members of their local Sumalatha Arts Club, headed by Pavithran aka Paviyettan, a bachelor in his 30s whom they all look up to. Bibeesh, one of the members of the club, decides to get married without informing the club members and they take offense to this. When they question Bibeesh, they learn that the reason he didn't tell them is because his bride to be is Chandrika, a girl whom Abhi has loved since his school days, yet never has been able to confess to. He however knows that Chandrika loves him as well. When Bibeesh decides to proceed with the wedding nonetheless, Abhi, Kiran and Amal decide to ruin the wedding before it even happens. They however decide not to involve Pavithran in their plans, believing he won't approve of it.

Meanwhile, Chandrika is unhappy with the wedding, as it was arranged without her interest or consent by Ravindran, her strict father. Sujina, Chandrika's elder sister, knows this, as well as the fact that Chandrika loves a boy named Abhi. She approaches Pavithran, who is a friend following a failed marriage alliance between the two, and asks his help in ruining the upcoming wedding. Despite his hesitations and worries, Pavithran decides to help, having understood the problems in the whole thing. He, along with his neighbor Chandran, try to ruin the wedding, but do not inform of their plan to the rest of club members, believing it will set a bad example to them.

The two groups, separately, try hook and crook to make sure the wedding doesn't happen, but nothing works. Their attempts to keep the truth hidden from the other, further complicates the situation. Eventually, Pavithran and the Club Members realize the truth and the fact that they are working towards the same goal, so they decide to work together. As a last ditch effort, they decide to help Chandrika and Abhi elope and get married in a nearby temple. Everything goes without a hitch, until they reach the temple, where they learn to their shock that the "Abhi" that Chandrika loves is not their Abhi, but a guy named Abhishek, who works as a driver. She actually doesn't even know their Abhi, or the fact the he loves her. They nonetheless get Chandrika and Abhishek married. They also learn that Bibeesh actually has a girlfriend, with whom he reconciled and eloped on the same day as Chandrika.

At the end of everything, the club members decide to find the positive out of their experiences. Abhi decides to earn a living, eventually finding his own happiness, while Pavithran and Sujina get married, having fallen in love during their efforts to help Chandrika. Pavithran also assures that he'll find a way to mend the differences between Chandrika and Ravindran and invite her and Abhishek back home. Kiran, an aspiring director, writes a script based on his experiences that becomes a success and is interviewed by a journalist, where he speaks about reality and imagination, using a spinning top as an example.

== Cast ==
- Suraj Venjaramoodu as Pavithran aka Paviyettan
- Basil Joseph as Kiran
- Saiju Kurup as Abhi aka Abhiyettan Chandrika's one-side love interest
- Niranjana Anoop as Chandrika, Sujina's younger sister
- Tanvi Ram as Sujina, Pavithran's love interest and Chandrika's elder sister
- Aswin Vijayan as Amal
- Rajesh Sharma as Ravindran
- Abhiram Radhakrishnan as Bibeesh
- Maniyanpilla Raju as Shambu
- Unni Raja as Photographer
- Neeraj Madhav as Abhishek, Chandrika's real love interest(Cameo Appearance)

== Production ==
The film is the first feature film for director Adithyan Chandrashekar. The title was announced in November 2022. The production company announced that the film would be released on 10 February 2023, then postponing it to 17 February to coincide with other releases on that date. The trailer was released on 4 February 2023.

== Release ==
The film was released in theatres on 17 February 2023. The digital rights were acquired by ManoramaMAX, and it started streaming on the platform and also via Amazon Prime Video Channels on 1 April 2023.

== Reception ==
The film received mixed responses upon release. Anna Mathews critic of The Times of India gave 3 out of 5 stars, calling it a "Mild entertainer". S.R. Praveen from The Hindu wrote that "The humour falls flat in this old-fashioned tale" India Today gave it 3 stars out of 5 and stated that "It's more about love and friendship in general, but Adithyan Chadrashekar and Arjun Narayanan have given us a film that we can enjoy and leave the theatre smiling.

== Box office ==
According to Times of India, the film collected Rs 1.67 crores at the box office.
