= Chandramathi =

Indian writer (born 1954)

- Born: 17 January 1954 (age 72); Thiruvananthapuram, Kerala, India
- Education: University of Kerala
- Occupations: Author; academic; translator; critic
- Writing career
- Pen name: Chandramathi
- Language: English, Malayalam
- Notable awards: Padmarajan Puraskaram, Kerala Sahitya Akademi Award
- Website: chandrikabalan.com

Chandrika Balan (born 17 January 1954) is an Indian writer who has published books in English and Malayalam, under the pen name Chandramathi. She is a writer of fiction, translator, and critic in English and Malayalam. Chandramathi has published four books in English and 20 in Malayalam, including 12 collections of short stories, an anthology of medieval Malayalam poetry, two collections of essays, two memoirs, and five books translated from English. The Malayalam film Njandukalude Nattil Oridavela was based on her book.

== Biography ==
Chandramathi was born in Thiruvananthapuram, Kerala. She graduated in English Language and Literature from the University of Kerala in 1976. In 1988 she received her PhD, from the University of Kerala. She was Professor of English literature at All Saints' College, Thriuvananthapuram. From 1993 to 1994 she served as Executive Editor of Medieval Indian Literature. She received the Professor Sivaprasad Foundation Award for Most Outstanding Teacher in 1999 and Alumni Association of St. Berchmans College's award for Best College Teacher in Kerala in 2002. In 1998 she visited Sweden with a team of 10 Indian writers under the Sahitya Akademi's cultural exchange programme. The visit inspired her to write the short story "Reindeer".

== Awards ==
- Thoppil Ravi Foundation Award (1995)
- V.P.Sivakumar Smaraka Keli award for The Best Short Story of the Year (1996)
- Katha National Award for fiction and translation (1997)
- The State Bank of Travancore Literary Award for the Best Collection of fiction, 1997. (1998)
- Odakkuzhal Award for the Best Work, 1998.
- The Kerala Sahitya Akademi Award for Best Fiction-1996-1998. (1999)
- The Muthukulam Parvathy Amma Award for the Best Woman Writer of 2003. (2004)
- A.P.Kalakkad Award for the Best Fiction. (2004)
- Kerala Sahitya Akademi C.B.Kumar Endowment Award for the Best collection of Essays. (2005)
- Padmarajan Puraskaram for the Best Short Fiction of 2006. (2007)
- Kairali Award (New York) for the Best Writer in Malayalam (2007)
- Avaneebala Puraskaram for the best woman writer (2009)
- O.V.Vijayan Puraskaram for the best work of short fiction. The Indian Express. 23 October 2016.
- The first Snehathalam Award for Excellence in the field of Literary Works. 2018
- Pattom Ramachandran Nair Smaraka award for total contribution to Malayalam Literature. 2022.
- Padmarajan Puraskaram for the Best Novel of the Year (2026) for "Ozhukathe Oru Puzha."

== Selected works ==
=== Books in English ===
- V. K. Krishna Menon. (Co-Author). Madras: Macmillan, 1990.
- Best-Loved Stories. (Co-Editor). Madras: Anu Chitra, 1991.
- The Private Garden : Family in Post-war British Drama. (Author). New Delhi: Academic Foundation, 1993.
- Critical Spectrum: Responses to Contemporary Literary Theories. (Editor). Calcutta : Papyrus, 1993.
- Arya and Other Stories. Hyderabad: Orient Blackswan, 2014.
- Invisible Walls. Novel. Published by Niyogi Books, New Delhi.2018.

=== Books in Malayalam: fiction ===
- Aryavarthanam. [Arya Repeated]. Kottayam: DC Books, 1995.
- Devigramam. [Village of the Goddess] Kottayam: DC Books, 1997.
- Reindeer. Calicut: Mulberry, 1998.
- Swayam, Swantham. [Me, Mine]. Trivandrum: Prabhath Books, 1999.
- Vethaalakathakal. [Tales From the Vetaal]. Thrissur : Current Books, 1999.
- Daivam Swargathil. [ God is in His Heaven]. Kottayam: DC Books, 2000.
- Thattarakkudiyile Vigrahangal. [The Idols of the Blacksmiths' Street]. Kollam: Sankeertanam- Publishers, 2002.
- Annayude Athazhavirundu. [Anna's Banquet]. Kottyam: DC Books, 2006.
- Ente Priyappetta Kathakal. [ Stories Dear to Me]. Kottayam: DC Books
- Chandramathiyude Kathakal. [Compilation all the stories]. Kottayam: DC Books, 2009.
- Ivide Oru Techie. [ A Techie Here ]. Kottayam: DC Books, 2010.
- Sherlock Holmes. [Stories for children]. Calicut : Poorna Publications, 2010.

Aparnayude Thadavarakal(Aswathiyudethum) [ The Prison houses of Aparna; Aswathy's Too. NOVEL]. Kottayam: DCBooks 2013

- Ningal Nireekshanathilaanu" [ You are Under Surveillance]. Kottayam: DC Books, 2017
- Wanderlust. Kottayam: DC Books. 2020
- Ozhukathe Oru Puzha. [A Stagnant Stream]. Novel on the life of Sophia Tolstoy). Kozhikode: Mathrubhumi Books, 2025.

Children's Literature

- Sherlock Holmes Calucut: Poorna
- Thankathilakkam. Calicut: Mathrubhumi
- Snehapoorvam Nikitha. Kottayam: DCBooks
- Ishtakkuttiyum Ishtallakkuttiyum. H&C Books. 2023

=== Books in Malayalam: non-fiction ===
- Madhyakaala Malayala Kavitha. [Medieval Malayalam Poetry] (Co-Editor). New Delhi : National Book Trust, 1998.
- Perilla Prasnangal. [ Problems without a Name]. Thrissur: Current Books, 2003.
- Njandukalude Naattil Oru Idavela. [ An Interval in the Land of the Crabs : Cancer memoirs]. Kottayam: DC Books, 2006.
- Sooryarajaavinte Pranayini. [The Lover of the Sun-God]. Kottayam : DC Books, 2007.
- Njan Oru Veedu. [I, A House]. (Childhood Memoirs). Trichur: H&C, 2010.Revised edition by H&C in 2022.
- Oliverude Diarykkurippukal. [ Ruskin Bond's novel Mr. Oliver's Diary ].Kottayam: DC Books,2011.

The latest Malayalam movie of Nivin Pauly—Njandukalude Nattil Oru Idavela is based on Chandramati's well-known memoirs titled Njandukalude Nattil Oru Idavela which is an autobiographical story of her long fight with cancer and survival.

- Lenin Rajendran's award winning movie രാത്രിമഴ (Night Rain) is based on her short story "Website"

=== Books in Malayalam: translations ===
- Thakazhi Sivasankara Pillai. (Monograph by K. Ayyappa Paniker). Kottayam : DC Books, 1992.
- Janu. (Novel by Menon Marath). Thrissur : Kerala Sahitya Akademi, 2003.
- Vanchana. (Harold Pinter's play : The Betrayal). Trivandrum : Chintha Publishers, 2008.
- Unmeshadinangal. ( Laurent Graff's novel Happy Days). Kottayam : DC Books, 2010.
- Kazhinja Kaalangal. (Harold Pinter's play Old Times) Trivandrum: Chintha Publishers, 2010.
