= Chethan Jayalal =

Indian actor

- Occupation: actor
- Years active: 2012–present
- Parent(s): Jayalal; Manuja

Chethan Jayalal is an Indian actor who appears in Malayalam films. He is known for Guppy (2016), Iyobinte Pusthakam (2014) and Oppam (2016). He won the Kerala State Film Award for Best Child Artist in 2016 for portraying the character Guppy in the film Guppy.

== Filmography ==
1. Nanpakal Nerathu Mayakkam (2023)
2. Bheeshma Parvam (2022)
3. I promise RIA (2020)- Web Series
4. Ambili (2019)
5. Varathan (2018) – Preman
6. Sanchari (2018) - Short film
7. En Kadhal (2018) - Musical Album
8. Carbon (2018) – Kannan
9. Crossroad (2017)
10. Sughamano Daveede. (2017)
11. Rakshadhikari Baiju Oppu (2017) – Vipin
12. Guppy (2016) – Guppy
13. Oppam (2016)
14. Charlie (2015) – Balan Pillai
15. Jilebi (2015)
16. Lailaa O Lailaa (2015)
17. Oru Vadakkan Selfie (2015)
18. Chirakodinja Kinavukal (2015)
19. Vikramadithyan (2014)
20. Iyobinte Pusthakam (2014)
21. Central Theater (2014)
22. Sesham Kadhabhagam (2014)
23. Law Point (2014)
24. Thanal Theduna Bhoomi (2014)
25. Salala Mobiles (2014)
26. Orissa (2013)
27. 5 Sundarikal (2013) – Abhilash
28. ABCD: American-Born Confused Desi (2013)
29. Black Forest (2013)
30. Theevram (2012)
31. Ozhimuri (2012)
32. Bachelor Party (2012) - Tony(childhood)
