= George Kora =

Indian actor and filmmaker

- Citizenship: Indian
- Occupations: Actor; Writer; Director
- Years active: 2015–Present
- Spouse: Grace Zacharia

George Kora is an Indian actor and filmmaker who works in Malayalam film industry. He is known for directing Tholvi F.C. and Thirike.

== Filmography ==
Year	Title	Director	Writer	Notes	Ref.
2017	Njandukalude Nattil Oridavela	No	Yes	Written with Althaf Salim	
2021	Thirike	Yes	Yes	Directed with Sam Xavier	
2023	Tholvi F.C.	Yes	Yes		

=== As actor ===
Year	Title	Role	Notes	Ref.
2015	Premam	George		
2021	Thirike	Thoma		
2022	Anantham	Krishnan Menon	Tamil TV Series	
2022	Mukundan Unni Associates	Dr. Vincent		
2023	Janaki Jaane	Martin		
2023	Tholvi F.C.	Thambi		
2023	Christy	Sajan		
2025	Nesippaya	Karthik Adhinarayanan	Tamil film	
