= 24 Days (2019 film) =

- Directed by: Sreekanth.E.G
- Screenplay by: Sreekanth.E.G; Adith.U.S
- Story by: Sreekanth.E.G; Adith.U.S
- Produced by: Adith.U.S
- Starring: Adith.U.S; Ranjith Gopal; Binoy Sudhan; K.K. Menon
- Cinematography: Nijin Lightroom
- Edited by: Pradeep Shankar
- Music by: Seven Clouds; Vishnu Shyam (BGM)
- Production company: LetGo Productions
- Release dates: 24 January 2019 (Jaipur); 17 January 2020
- Running time: 90 minutes
- Country: India
- Language: Malayalam

24 Days is a 2019 Indian Malayalam-language film, directed by debutant Sreekanth.E.G and produced by Adith.U.S, who also plays the lead role. The film was an official selection in several film festivals and has won many accolades and had the theatrical release on 17 January 2020. The digital release of the film was through OTT service 'Saina Play'.

== Plot ==
24 Days tells the story of a group of youngsters who becomes a part of a bike rally that starts from Kanyakumari and ends at the Great Himalayas precisely in 24 days.

== Cast ==
- Adith.U.S. - Steephen
- Ranjith Gopal - Chethan
- Binoy Sudhan - Nabeel
- K.K. Menon - Swami & Vikram Sir
- Shajeerlal - Ikka
- Risham Khan - Ron
- Anilkumar - Father
- Charulatha - Amma
- Shyamala Amma - Vallyammachi
- Rajani Nedumangad - Nurse
- Uma - Riya / Nurse
- Rajeev Ashok - Man in the Forest
- Simi Sunny - Elder daughter
- Shaji A.J. - Doctor

== Production ==
Sreekanth and Adith are officers in merchant navy and were college mates. They decided to make the film once they zeroed in the subject and communicated through email to complete the screenplay. Major funding for the movie was done by seafarers, mainly the captains and chief engineers who sailed with Adith and Sreekanth and their batchmates from their college. 15 actors were selected through audition held at Trivandrum, conducted by Criyathmah and they had to undergo 3 days acting workshop under actor Santhosh Keezhattoor and Anuj Ramachandran. The principal photography of the film started on 13 August 2017 and the film was shot at the locations of Trivandrum, Kanyakumari, Waynad and Kannur, with the scenes involving Adith alone was shot with just the actor, director and cinematographer. The film was completed in a span of 45 days. Adith and Sreekanth along with their friends, Rakesh, Jithin A K, Jithin K V and Davis co-founded the production house 'LetGo Productions', where ‘Let Go’ is the terminology to drop the anchor, as commanded by the captain of the ship.

== Accolades ==
| Year | Festival | Category | Result | Ref. |
|---|---|---|---|---|
| 2019 | Jaipur International Film Festival | Mainstream | Won Best Makeup artist and Hair stylist | |
