= Jenith Kachappilly =

Indian writer and director (born 1987)

- Born: 23 June 1987 (age 38)
- Citizenship: Indian
- Occupations: Writer; film director
- Years active: 2020 - present

Jenith Kachappilly is an Indian writer and film director who works in the Malayalam film industry. He is known for his works in Mariyam Vannu Vilakkoothi and Abhilasham.

== Filmography ==
List of Jenith Kachappilly film credits as director or writer
Year	Title	Credited as		Notes	Ref.
Year	Title	Director	Writer	Notes	Ref.
2020	Mariyam Vannu Vilakkoothi	Yes	Yes	Debut film	
2025	Abhilasham	No	Yes		
