= Mayoon =

Village in northern Pakistan

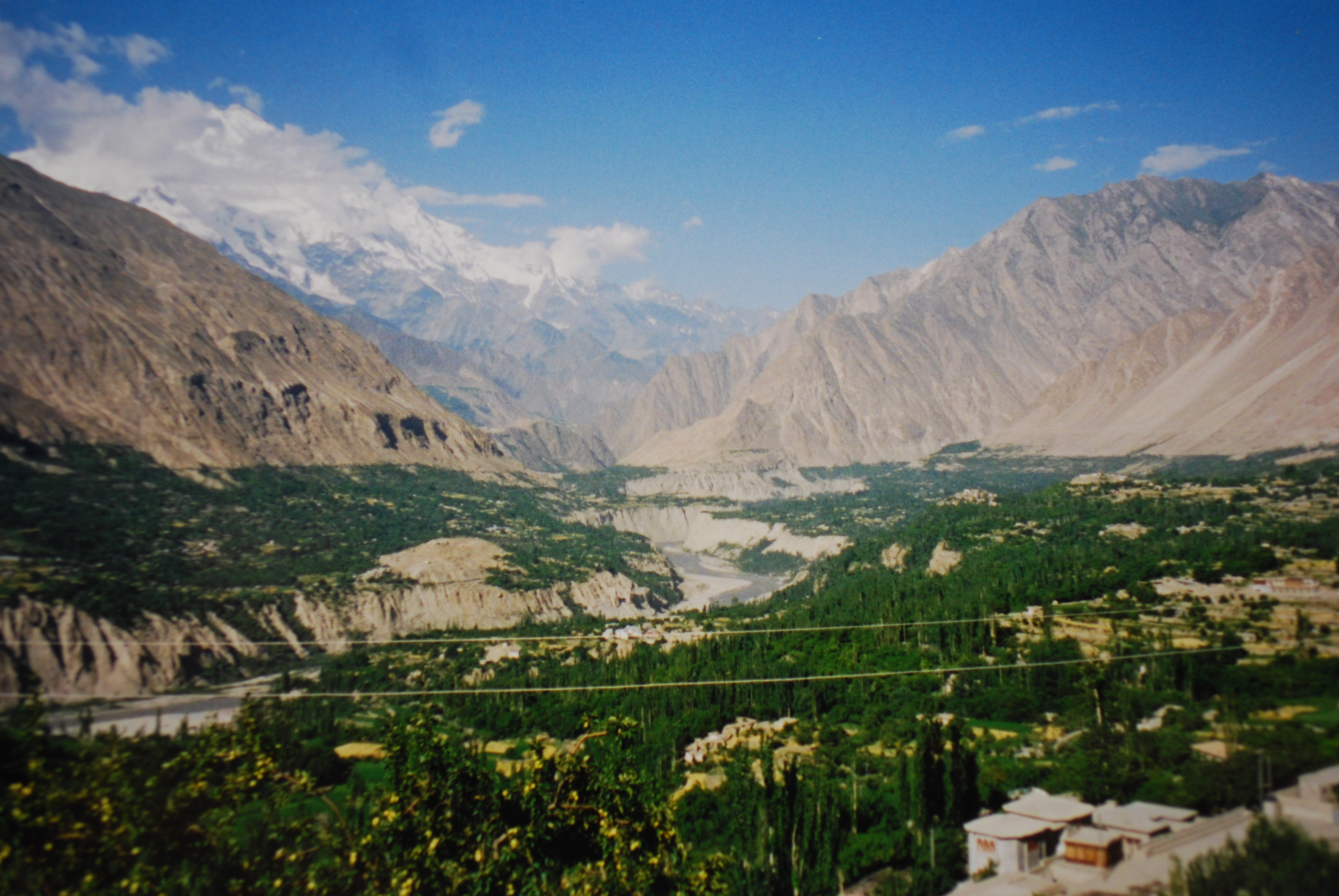
View of Hunza Valley near Mayoon

Mayoon or Maiun is a village and a small region of modern farms in the high mountainous Hunza area of northern Pakistan. It lies along one of the paths of the ancient Silk Road and has long been a trade crossroads for China, Afghanistan, India, and Pakistan. This has led to skirmishes and battles over the centuries.

Mayoon has approximately 120 dwellings (1,000 residents) along the alpine Hunza-Nagar River. Mayoon is 218 km southwest of China by the Karakoram Highway, 150 km north of India, and less than 100 km southeast of Afghanistan. The economy is sustained by agriculture and tourism. This region of the Hunza Valley is known for its high quality water, scenic views of the nearby mountain peaks, and its advanced agriculture. Major crops include corn, wheat, mulberries, peas and assorted vegetables. The mountainous region also produces fruits including grapes, apricots, plums, and cherries.

== Language ==
The dominant local language is Shina, an Indo-Aryan language. The Shina spoken at Mayoon is a regional dialect which diverges somewhat from the Shina spoken in nearby Gilgit and Nager. Brushuski, Wakhi language, and Domki are also spoken within the region. Urdu, Pakistan's national language, functions as the lingua franca while English is spoken among the educated and those involved in the tourism industry.

== History ==
Most of Mayoon's 1,000 residents are descendants of Shinaki Hunza migrants from the town of Nasirabad. The Shinaki group settled the area in the early 19th century.

The region falls along one of the many Silk Road trade routes and has been contested by Chinese, Indian, Afghan, Soviet, and English armies over the centuries. Nasirabad and Mayoon are old settlements which used to be the first bastions of defence in the lower Hunza valley, protecting the main upper Hunza region. People from Nasirabad and Mayoon fought wars and battles against Sikhs, British and other forces in the late 19th century. ‘Sikh Mara Jung’ is a deep, narrow valley where the people of Mayoon defeated an army of 500 Sikhs in a single night. Colonel Durand was wounded by a gunshot, reportedly fired from Mayoon Fort.

The modern stereotyping of Shinakis as straightforward and aggressive people stems from the centuries of fighting. Besides warfare, the region of the Hunza Shinaki was also famous for its simplicity. The King of Hunza had a special respect for lower Hunza. In the modern era, people of these areas are typically well educated, simple and financially strong. Amir Hussain, emerging young intellectual, columnist and one of the leading social development experts of Gilgit-Baltistan, belongs to the Village of Mayoon. He is a graduate of the London School of Economics and has been one of the well known figures in the contemporary intellectual history of Hunza.

== Culture ==
The culture of the Shinaki tribe of Mayoon derives from local social customs and religious practice. The main celebrations are Nowruz, Ginani and Saalgirah. On such occasions, traditional delicacies are made.

Mayoon is a Pakistani pre-wedding custom, during which the bride often goes into a 7 to 15-day seclusion before the wedding. The seclusion is from the groom until the wedding. In other cases, a party of her close friends is held, during which she dresses in yellow. It is not known if this custom takes its name from the community of Mayoon, or if the name is separately derived.

Both private and government educational institutions operate in the region. Most of the people of the Mayoon region are Isma'ili Muslims, followers of the Aga Khan.

== Transport ==
Popularly known as the Silk Road, the Karakoram Highway (KKH) runs about 100 km from Gilgit to Hunza. Most people travel by road; it takes between two and three hours to reach Hunza from Gilgit. The journey from Islamabad to Hunza can take as long as 24 hours. The main bus stand is on the KKH in Aliabad. Along the KKH, there are booking agents in towns for long-distance buses and jeeps.

From Kashgar (China), a regular international bus service to Hunza via Sust crosses the Khunjerab Pass (about 5000 meters high). Across the river in Hunza, at Sust, there is a village called Khuda Abad. People usually do not stop at Khunjerab Pass on their way to Sust by bus. In Sust, one may trek in the valleys or continue to Hunza-Karimabad (two hours), to the Baltit Fort. The Khunjerab Pass is open from 1 May to 30 December and closed in winter.

The international bus waits until enough people have gathered, which can take days (as of 2012). An alternative option is to take a first bus to Tashkurgan, stay one night, go to immigration for departure approval and then take a second bus to Sust and another to Hunza.

=== Airport ===
Mayoon is served by Gilgit Airport (IATA: GIL), a small domestic terminal approximately 40 km to the south. It offers 45-minute flights to Islamabad, substantially reducing the transit from 15 hours by car or 24 hours by bus. The service is provided by Pakistan International Airlines (PIA), which offers regular flights on 42-seat planes between Gilgit and Islamabad. Connections, however, are often subject to weather cancellations, particularly in winter when flights may be delayed several days.

=== Transport links ===
- To China: The bus service (NATCO & PTDC) is scheduled to begin crossing the border from Sust, Gilgit-Baltistan to Tashkurgan, China every day at nine o'clock in the summer. In autumn, the bus runs only when full. If passengers are lacking, buses may be delayed for several days before embarking to Tashkurgan.
- To Islamabad via the Karakoram Highway: several buses leave each day from Ali Abad (20 km east), Hunza, and Gilgit.
- To Gilgit via the Karakoram Highway: mini-buses leave for Gilgit every 30 minutes from Ali Abad (20 km east).

== Demographics ==
The approximately 1,000 inhabitants of Mayoon occupy about 120 dwellings. The people are broadly considered Hunza. The fair-skinned and light-eyed Hunzakuts are somewhat anomalous to the region and claim to be descendants of soldiers lost from Alexander's army when Alexander invaded India in 326 BC, although genetic studies have not confirmed this speculation.

== Geography ==
Mayoon is in a mountainous region and has an elevation of 1892 meters. The swift-flowing Hunza Nagar River provides ample water for irrigation of crops, but it also serves as a barrier that prevents direct access from the community of Mayoon to the paved Karakoram Highway. Access is by a shallow river crossing about 10 kilometres away. The community occupies a wedge of fertile land 1 kilometre east-west and 0.5 kilometre north-south. Its geographic coordinates are 36°14'25"N, 74°25'28"E.

Nearby major peaks include the Rakaposhi (7788 m), the recently climbed Ultar Peak (7388 m) and Bublimoting Peak (6000 m).
