= Kochaal =

- Release poster
- Directed by: Shyam Mohan
- Written by: Midhun; Prajith
- Produced by: Deep Nagda
- Starring: Krishna Shankar; Murali Gopy; Indrans
- Cinematography: Jomon Thomas; Arun Bhaskar
- Edited by: Bijish Balakrishnan
- Music by: Songs: P S Jayhari; Iskra; Background Score: Manikandan Ayyappa
- Production company: Sierra Talkies
- Distributed by: Century Films
- Release date: 10 June 2022
- Running time: 147 minutes
- Country: India
- Language: Malayalam

Kochaal is 2022 Indian Malayalam-language action film directed by Shyam Mohan and produced by Sierra Talkies. It stars Krishna Shankar, Murali Gopy, Indrans, and Shine Tom Chacko in lead roles.

== Cast ==
- Krishna Shankar as CPO Sreekuttan/Kochaal
- Murali Gopy as DYSP Simon Thomas
- Indrans as Senior CPO Poulose
- Shine Tom Chacko as Pinker Babu
- Arya Salim as Nisha
- Zeenath as Mariyamma
- Vijayaraghavan as Paily
- Gokulan as SCPO
- Chembil Ashokan
- Assim Jamal
- Nishanth Sagar

== Production ==
The puja function of the film was held in Kochi. The film shooting started in December 2019 but was postponed due to the COVID-19 pandemic. The teaser and trailer were released prior to the main release of the film.

== Release ==
The film was released on 10 June 2022 in theatres and streamed on ZEE5 on 27 November 2022.

== Reception ==
Vinod Nair, a critic writing in The Times of India, gave the film 3 stars out of 5, stating that "Shyam Mohan's direction is lacking is [sic] creating a full picture of the protagonist's life, his family, romance etc., and so the character isn't memorable and you don't sympathise or empathise with him". A critic from Indian Express stated that "Jomon Thomas' visuals add to the enjoyment level of the film". Critics of the Manorama Online gave mixed reviews. A Times Internet critic also 3 gave the film stars out of 5, commenting that "The film is doing justice to the audience".
