= Ambili (film) =

2019 film directed by Johnpaul George

- Theatrical release poster
- Directed by: Johnpaul George
- Written by: Johnpaul George
- Produced by: Mukesh R. Mehta; A. V. Anoop; C. V. Sarathi
- Starring: Soubin Shahir; Naveen Nazim; Tanvi Ram
- Cinematography: Sharan Velayudhan
- Edited by: Kiran Das
- Music by: Vishnu Vijay
- Production companies: E4 Entertainment; AVA Productions
- Distributed by: World Wide Films
- Release date: 9 August 2019
- Running time: 140 min
- Country: India
- Language: Malayalam

Ambili is a 2019 Indian Malayalam-language comedy drama film written and directed by Johnpaul George. The film is produced by Mukesh R. Mehta, A. V. Anoop, C. V. Sarathi under the banner of E4 Entertainment and AVA productions. It stars Soubin Shahir, Naveen Nazim and Tanvi Ram.

Guileless like a child and ever so full of life, Ambili is beloved to everyone in his village. The story traces Ambili's outlook towards life and the challenges that he faces everyday. This movie received positive response from audience but bombed at the box office due to the 2019 Kerala floods that affected viewership in theatres.

== Plot ==
Ambili Ganapathi (Soubin Shahir), a mentally challenged yet lovable orphan man, lives with his grandmother in a town in Kerala. The film starts off with an insight into his relationship with his childhood crush Teena Kurian (Tanvi Ram).

Ambili faces his daily struggles in life with a smile, slowly winning the hearts of everyone in the village. Teena's younger brother and Ambili's old friend Bobby Kurian (Naveen Nazim) is a cyclist and a frequent traveller whose passion is to get into the Guinness World Records by having the Around the World Cycling Record. Before heading to his cycling trip to Kashmir, he heads home to meet his family, where Teena expresses her desire to marry Ambili. Upset by this, Bobby fights with Ambili and sets off for his trip to Kashmir. Ambili, who looks up to Bobby, follows Bobby on his cycle. Bobby, though angry at first, later lets Ambili join him. It is later revealed that Ambili's parents died in a terrorist attack in Kashmir when he was young. His father Major Ganapathi (Binu Pappu) was a Military Officer in the Indian Army and was the one who taught Bobby how to cycle. The journey eventually restores the lost bond between Bobby and Ambili. When they finally reach Kashmir, Ambili is filled with emotions as he remembers his family and growing up with Teena and Bobby.

== Cast ==
- Soubin Shahir as Ambili Ganapathi
  - Ajmal M. V. as Young Ambili
- Naveen Nazim as Bobby Kurian
  - Nizam Zifran as Young Bobby
- Tanvi Ram as Teena Kurian
  - Sanjana as Young Teena
- Jaffar Idukki as P. Vijayan
- Sreelatha Namboothiri as Teena's grandmother
- Rabiya Beegum
- Binu Pappu as Major Ganapathi, Ambili's deceased father
- Vettukili Prakash as Kurian / Kuriachen, father of Teena and Bobby, and Army colleague of Ganapathi
- Neena Kurup as Kuriachen's wife, mother of Teena and Bobby
- Anil K. Shivaram as Police Constable
- Kochu Preman as Vasukkuttan
- Fahadh Faasil as Narrator

== Release ==
The official teaser was released by E4 Entertainment on 19 July 2019.

The film was released on 9 August 2019.

== Soundtrack ==
Ambili

Soundtrack album by Vishnu Vijay
- Released: 2019
- Genre: Film soundtrack
- Length: 35:30
- Language: Malayalam
- Label: E4 Entertainment
- Producer: Vishnu Vijay

Vishnu Vijay chronology
Guppy (2016)	Ambili (2019)	Nayattu (2021)

The soundtrack for Ambili was composed by Vishnu Vijay and Sujith Sreedhar. Song released under E4 Entertainment official label.

Track listing
No.	Title	Lyrics	Singer(s)	Length
1.	"Njan Jackson Allada"	Vinayak Sasikumar	Anthony Daasan	4:27
2.	"Aaradhike"	Vinayak Sasikumar	Sooraj Santhosh, Madhuvanthi Narayan	5:53
3.	"Oru cherukiliyude"	Vinayak Sasikumar	Benny Dayal, Chorus
4.	"Nenchakame"	Vinayak Sasikumar	Shankar Mahadevan
5.	"Kunjanambili"	Vinayak Sasikumar	Sajani, Idashiga, Riya, Kavya, Shreya, Thejaswini
6.	"Pulari virinju melle"	Vinayak Sasikumar	Vishnu Vijay
7.	"Aajare aajare"	Kamal Karthik	Ramesh Narayan, Madhuvanti Narayan
Total length:				35.30
