= Sooraj Santhosh =

Indian singer

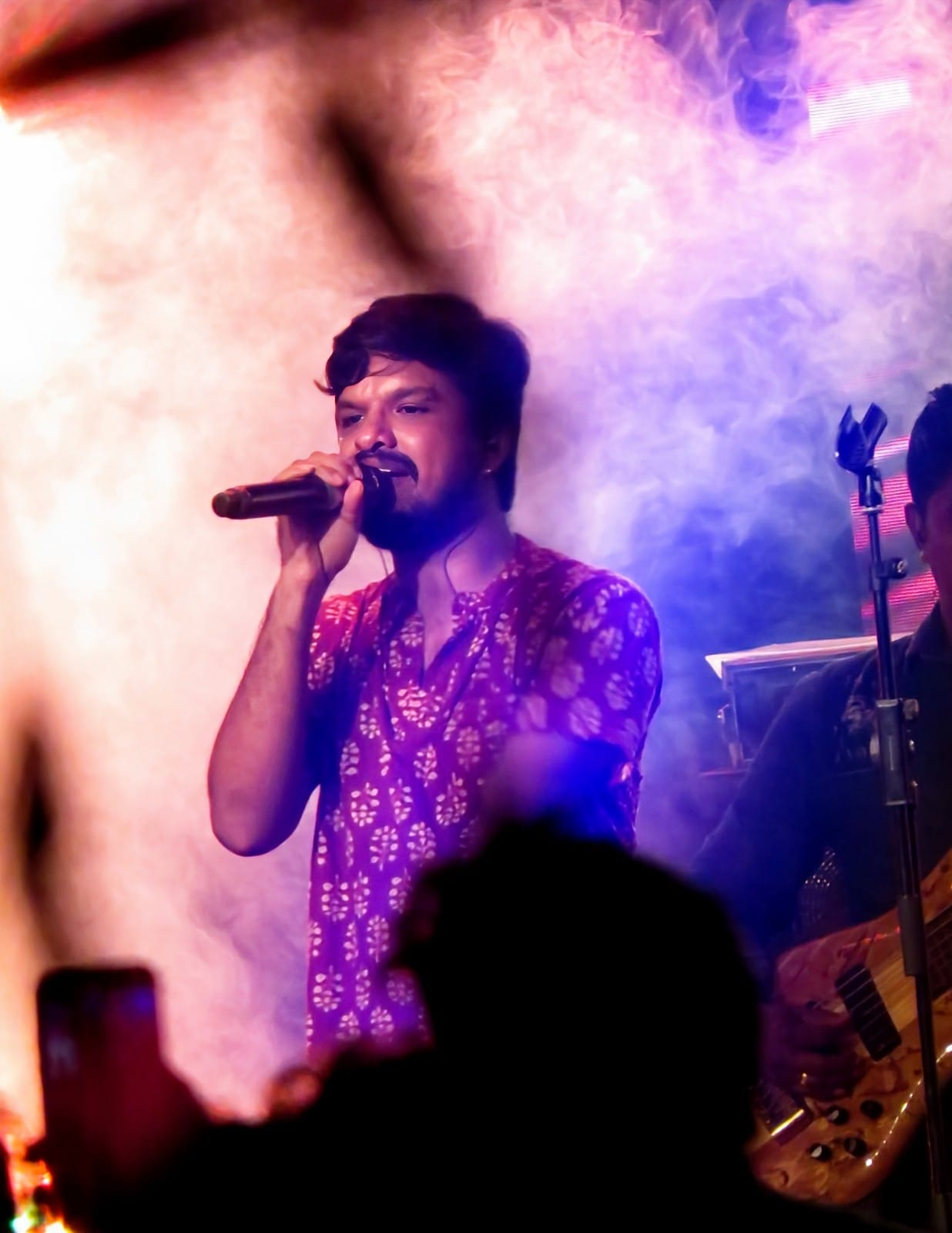

Background information
- Born: 19 September 1987 (age 39); Paravur, Kollam, Kerala, India
- Occupations: Singer; Songwriter; Music Composer
- Member of: Sooraj Santhosh Live
- Formerly of: Masala Coffee
- Website: soorajsanthosh.com

Sooraj Santhosh (born September 19, 1987) is an Indian singer, songwriter, and composer. Santhosh is the recipient of a Kerala State Film Award (2016), 2 Mirchi Music Awards, and a Kerala State Film Critics Award (2021). He has sung around 300 songs in 8 languages.

Santhosh released his independent solo EP, The Gypsy Sun, in 2020. It's a multi-genre, multi-lingual album that consists of 5 songs.

Santhosh was the lead singer and has composed and performed with Masala Coffee until 2019, when he decided to dedicate more time to his own creative endeavors. Now he performs with his own band, Sooraj Santhosh Live.

== Career ==
In 2016, he was awarded the Kerala State Film Award for Best Playback Singer for the song "Thaniye", composed by Vishnu Vijay for the film Guppy.

Santhosh's first international project was with Ganesh B Kumar and the European Chamber Choir. He performed the Shanmukha Kavacham in Germany along with the Choir.

=== Independent Music ===
In 2019, Santhosh started work on his solo independent EP, The Gypsy Sun, which had five songs in it. It's a multi-lingual album with tracks in Malayalam, Hindi and Tamil. He collaborated with musicians from across genres for this, like the hiphop artist Insanoid, music producer Varkey, and the renowned singer Sayanora.

=== Masala Coffee ===
Santhosh was the former lead vocalist of Masala Coffee, which made its debut on Kappa TV's Music Mojo. The band composed the soundtrack for the Tamil movie, Uriyadi, co-produced by Nalan Kumarasamy. They composed the title track and featured in a promo video for the Malayalam movie, Hello Namasthe. Masala Coffee performed at the RAAG 'N' ROCK Indie Music Festival at Al Nasr Leisureland, Dubai, on September 11, 2015, releasing their first music video titled 'Aalayaal Tharam Venam', in 2016.

His first song "Inka Etho" composed by G.V Prakash for the Telugu Darling won him the Mirchi Music Awards South conducted by Radio Mirchi for the Best Upcoming Singer in Telugu (2010). "A Special program on the Mirchi Music Awards hosted to felicitate all the singers and musicians of South India"

Santhosh made his entry into the Tamil film industry by singing "Uyirin Suvaril" and "Vegam vegam" in the movie Sridhar (2012), which the music was composed by Rahul Raj. He got his break with a duet song "Yamma Yamma" in All in All Azhagu Raja (2013) with Shreya Ghoshal, music composed by S. Thaman. "Othakadai othakadai" and "Yaelley Yaelley" from the film Pandiya Naadu (2013) composed by D. Imman are other Tamil songs.

He has been nominated in the category of Best Upcoming Vocalist (Male) in Malayalam (2013) by Music Mirchi Awards, for his rendition of the song 'Iniyum Nin Mounam' for the movie KQ.

He won the Kerala State Film Award for Best Male Playback Singer for the song "Thaniye Mizhikal" from the film Guppy.

==== The Gypsy Sun ====
Santhosh is working on his debut solo album, which is a multilingual album consists of 6 songs, Recently he released one among them. "Thani Malayalam" which has wooed the audience with its unique theme and offbeat composition. The song's genesis is rooted in Santhosh's love for language. The Music Video features eminent personalities from Malayalam literature, culture, art and cinema like M T Vasudevan Nair, Sara Joseph, Benyamin, Nedumudi Venu, Peeshapilly Rajeevan, Artist Bhattathiri, Methil Devika, Peruvanam Kuttan Marar, Ramachandra Pulavar.

== Discography ==
=== Malayalam ===
Year	Film	Song
2013	Second Show	"Ee Ramayanakootil"
2013	Lokpal	"Arjunante"
2013	Lokpal	"Mayam Mayam"
2013	Rebecca Uthup Kizhakkemala	"Nin Neelamizhi"
2013	Ladies and Gentleman	"Palaniram padarume"
2013	KQ	"Iniyum Nin Mounam"
2015	Mallanum Mathevanum	"Azhakey Allimalarey"
2015	Kunjiramayanam	"Salsa"
2015	Madhura Naranga	"Oru Naal"
2015	Madhura Naranga	"Melle Vannu Konjiyo"
2016	Hello Namasthe	"Ulakil Karanamila"
2016	Guppy	"Thaniye"
2017	Team 5	"Azhcha"
2017	Ramante Edanthottam	"Kavitha Ezhuthunnu"
2017	Njandukalude Nattil Oridavela	"Enthaavo"
2017	Himalayathile Kashmalan	"Akkidi"
2017	Solo	"Aalayaal Thara Venam"
2018	Queen	"Vennilave"
2018	Naam	"Adichu Polichu"
2018	Naam	"Tank Takara"
2018	Naam	"Get Out House"
2018	Kaly	"Kinnam Katta Kallan"
2019	June	"Adyam Thammil"
2019	Kumbalangi Nights	"Uyiril Thodum"
2019	Ambili	"Aaraadhike"
2019	Android Kunjappan Version 5.25	"Pularan Neram"
2019	Underworld	"Paravakal"
2019	Subharathri	"Aalameenithinaadiyonu"
2019	Valiyaperunnal	"Labbaikkallah"
2019	Dear Comrade	"Mazhamegham"
2020	Anveshanam	"Ilam Poove"
2020	Gauthamante Radham	"Theythaka Tharam"
2020	Kappela	"Kannil Vidarum"
2021	Roy	"Arikin Arikil"
2021	Malik	"Theerame"
2021	Madhuram	"Gaaname"
2023	Tholvi F.C.	"Pathiye"
2024	Vaazha – Biopic of a Billion Boys	"Makane"
2024	Rifle Club	"Gandharva Ganam"
2024	Amaran (D)	"Uyire Uyire"
2025	Coolie (2025 film) (D)	"Kokki"
2026	Vaazha 2 (2026 film) (D)	"Koodappirannor"
2026	Vaazha 2 (2026 film) (D)	"Makane x Koodappirannor"

=== Tamil ===
Year	Film	Song
2012	Sridhar	Uyirin Suvaril Naane
2012	Sridhar	Vegam vegam
2012	Chandramouli	Kala Kala kala Kala
2012	Chandramouli	Dharmam Vazha
2013	Pandiya Naadu	Yaeley Yaeley Maruthu
2013	Pandiya Naadu	Othakadai Othakadai Machaan
2013	All in all Azhagu Raja	Yamma Yamma
2013	Varuthapadatha Vaalibar Sangam	Yennada Yennada
2013	Kadhal Solla Aasai	Madai Thiranthathu
2014	Bramman	Vaanathile Nilavu
2014	Sooraiyadal	Adiye Sarithaana
2014	Kadavul Paathi Mirugam Paathi	Naan Indru Naan Thaane
2014	Anjaan	Kaadhal Aasai
2015	Soan Papdi	Enga Kaattula Mazhai
2015	Mozhivathu Yadhenil	Vilai Illathadhu
2015	Ore Oru Raja Mokka Raaja	Malare Mooche Eduthu
2015	Thoppi	Paava patta naanga
2015	Achcharam	Perazhaghai Thirudida
2015	Ivanuku Thannila Gandam	Mappilla Mappilla
2015	Nanbargal Narpani Mandram	Sirichaenae Chinna Ponudha
2015	Kanchana 2	Motta Paiyan
2015	Vaa Deal	Vaa Deal
2015	Kida Poosari Magudi	Chinna Paya Vayasu
2015	Ithiraiyil Varum Sambavangal Anaihtum Karpanaiyae	Somariyum Neethan
2015	Vasuvum Saravananum Onna Padichavanga	Vasuvum Saravananum
2015	Puli	Mannavanae Mannavanae
2015	Pattanathu Raja	Edho Ondru Thonudhadi
2015	Selvandhan	Rama Rama
2015	Mooch	Marachan Bommai
2015	Jippaa Jimikki (2015)	Ayyo Ayyo
2015	Kuttram Nadanthathu Enna	Nee Konjumbothey
2015	Meymarandhaen Paaraayo	En Kaadhale
2015	Meymarandhaen Paaraayo	Appuram Enoa
2016	Vidayutham	Allipoo
2016	Uriyadi	Agni Kunjondru Kandaen
2016	Uriyadi	Kantha
2016	Munnodi	Akkam Pakkam
2017	Tubelight	Kaathirunden
2018	Santhoshathil Kalavaram	Kaatru Vaanga Nalla Kaatru
2018	Maniyaar Kudumbam	Adi Pappali Palame
2019	Kanne Kalaimaane	Endhan Kangalai
2019	Naadodigal 2	Adhuva Adhuva
2020	Kannum Kannum Kollaiyadithaal	Kanave Nee Naan
2025	3BHK	"Kaanalin Mele"
2025	Coolie	"Kokki"
2025	Aaromaley	"Valiye Valiye"
2025	Sirai	"Neelothi"'

=== Telugu ===
Year	Film	Song
2008	Villagelo Vinayakudu	Muddugaare
2010	Darling	Inka Edho
2012	Marina	Snehitudokadunte
2012	Crazy (Dubbed version)	Alagodhey Alagodhey
2012	Crazy (Dubbed version)	Theme Music
2013	ABCD: Any Body Can Dance (Dubbed version)	I am a fool
2013	ABCD: Any Body Can Dance (Dubbed version)	Chirunavvula Thotaku Swagatam
2013	Tadakha	Viyyalavaru
2013	Palnadu	Kalley Kalley Palike
2013	Satya 2	Bhashma dhaari
2013	Satya 2	Samaram Daarilo Velithey
2013	Adhee Lekka	Emaina edhemaina
2013	1-Nenokkadine	O Sayonara Sayonara
2014	Legend	Thanjavuru
2014	Ra Ra Krishnayya	Come on baby
2014	Alludu Sreenu	Labbar Bomma
2014	Rabhasa	Dam Damare
2014	Paathshala	Friendship Day Anthem Song
2014	Power	Nuvvu Nenu Janta
2014	Aagadu	Bhelpuri
2014	Ala Ela	Yedutakaladu
2014	Ala Ela	Yenduke
2015	Tiger	Hey Tiger
2015	Maha Maharaju	Evaremi Antunna
2015	S/O Satyamurthy	One & Two & Three
2015	S/O Satyamurthy	Chal Chalo Chalo
2015	Mosagallaku Mosagadu	Oho Sundari
2015	Mosagallaku Mosagadu	Raamaaya Raamabhadraaya
2015	Rakshasudu (2015)	Masss (Remix)
2015	Ganga	Gundabbaayi
2015	Ak Rao Pk Rao	Nuvu Vachetappudu
2015	Rahadhari	Na Manasu
2015	Srimanthudu	Rama Rama
2015	Jaya Suriya	Urike Chilaka
2015	Prema Leela	Jatha Kadathaavo
2015	Prema Leela	Jvaliyinchele
2015	Nenu Sailaja	Masti Masti
2016	Nannaku Prematho	Love Me Again
2016	Pelli Choopulu	Ee Babu Gariki
2016	Maari (Maas) (Dubbed version)	Donu Donu Donu
2016	Supreme	Anjaneyudu Neevadu
2017	Jaya Janaki Nayaka	Andhamaina Seetakoka Chiluka
2018	Soda Goli Soda	Teeranney
2018	Sanjeevani	Jaano
2019	Ee Nagaraniki Emaindi	Maarey Kalaley
2019	Brochevarevarura	Vaale Chinukule
2019	Nandini Nursing Home	Nanney Nanney
	Music Shop Murthy	"Chinni Chinni"
2025	Coolie (2025 film) (D)	"Kokki"

=== Kannada ===
Year	Film	Song
2014	Hara	Hare Rama
2015	Titlu Beka	Hrudya Maaro
2016	Godhi Banna Sadharana Mykattu	Ale Moodadhe
2016	Srinivasa Kalyana	Bettadmele Srinivasu
2017	Ondu Motteya Kathe	Keli Nodri
2019	Mundina Nildana	Manase Maya
2019	Dear Comrade (Dubbed version)	Kareyuveya

=== Hindi ===
Year	Film	Song
2025	Coolie (2025 film) (D)	"Kokki"

== Awards ==
- 2016: Best Male Playback Singer – 'Thaniye Mizhikal', Guppy
- 2017: SIIMA, Best Playback Singer (Malayalam)- 'Thaniye Mizhikal', Guppy
