= Thirike =

2021 Indian film directed by George Kora and Sam Xavier

- Directed by: George Kora; Sam Xavier
- Written by: George Kora
- Produced by: Abraham Joseph; Deepak Dilip Pawar
- Starring: Gopikrishna Varma; George Kora; Shanthi Krishna; Gopan Mangat; Sarasa Balussery; Namita Krishnamurthy; Jinu Ben; Ayden Abraham
- Cinematography: Cherin Paul
- Edited by: Lal Krishna
- Music by: Ankit Menon
- Production company: Nationwide Pictures
- Release date: 26 February 2021
- Running time: 109 minutes
- Country: India
- Language: Malayalam

Thirike (English: The Return) is a 2021 Indian Malayalam family film. The directoral debut of George Kora and Sam Xavier, the film stars Kora and Gopikrishna Varma in lead roles along with Shanthi Krishna, Gopan Mangat, Sarasa Balussery and Namita Krishnamurthy in supporting roles. The story depicts the strong bond of brotherhood between the lead characters, one of whom is a boy with Down syndrome.

Produced by Abraham Joseph and Deepak Dilip Pawar under the banner of Nationwide Pictures, the film was released on 26 February 2021 on regional OTT platform, Neestream.

== Synopsis ==
Little Thoma and his elder brother Sebu are abandoned at an orphanage after the death of their parents. Thoma is fiercely protective of Sebu who is a boy with Down syndrome. A young couple, Rafiq and Fatima, adopt Sebu leaving Thoma heartbroken.

Years later, Thoma, now a grown man and employed at a bakery, wants to reclaim his brother who is now rechristened as Ismu by his adoptive parents. Ismu is a happy-go-lucky boy who goes to a school for disabled children. Thoma, who is seldom allowed visitations to Ismu, uses every opportunity to reinstate the fact he is the rightful blood brother which irks Ismu's mother, Fatima. But soon Thoma sees his plans crumble when Fatima gives Thoma the news that they are shifting to Dubai for Ismu's better prospects. A shattered Thoma, in a last ditch desperate attempt, kidnaps his own brother and takes off to their childhood home.

The rest of the story is what follows as Thoma fulfils his half-hatched plan to reclaim his brother (who thinks they are on a fun brothers-only trip) and their past, while Rafiq and Fathima set out in search of their missing son. Soon the boys discover old roots and relations and have the time of their lives. But things take unexpected turns and Thoma comes to the painful realisation that his brother deserves more than him. Thus, he returns him home. But a year later, on a visit from Dubai, Fatima invites a newly reformed Thoma into the family too.

== Cast ==
- George Kora as Thoma
- Gopikrishna Varma as Ismu
- Shanthi Krishna as Fatima
- Gopan Mangat as Rafiq
- Namita Krishnamurthy as Sneha, Thoma's girlfriend
- Jinu Ben as Jinu, Manager of the bakery
- Sarasa Balussery as Sosama Ammichi
- Ayden Abraham as young Thoma
- Najim as young Sebu
- Anju Abraham as mother of young Thoma and Sebu
- Abraham Joseph as father of young Thoma and Sebu
- Franco Davis Manjila as Monichen
- Feroz Ismail as Feroz
- Ramkumar as Doctor
- Savio Joy as S I Balu

== Production ==
George Kora had written the script four years ago, but could not pursue it as he was unsure whether he could find an actor with Down syndrome. He discovered Gopikrishna with the help of Dr. Shaji Thomas John of Baby Memorial Hospital in Kozhikode. George is also the co-writer of the 2017 film 'Njandukalude Nattil Oridavela'.

Sam Xavier, an ad filmmaker, had worked as an assistant director for Bejoy Nambiar's 2017 bilingual film 'Solo'.

The film is the first production venture of Nationwide Pictures. It is co-produced by Ronylal James, Paul Karukappillil, Dijo Kurian, Manu Mattamana and Sijo Peter.

Principal photography took place in Kochi, Kumali, Kothamangalam and Thodupuzha. Cherin Paul is the cinematographer and Lal Krishna is the editor.

== Release and reception ==
Owing to COVID-19 pandemic, the film was released directly on regional OTT platform Neestream on 26 February 2021. The film received positive reviews with critics praising the performance and inclusion of a lead actor with down syndrome. The India Book of Records certified actor Gopikrishnan Varma and OTT platform Neestream for casting a hero with Down's Syndrome in a commercial movie for the first time.

== Soundtrack ==
Thirike

Soundtrack album by Ankit Menon
- Released: February 2021
- Genre: Film soundtrack
- Length: 11:40
- Language: Malayalam

Ankit Menon chronology
Gauthamante Radham (2020)	Thirike (2021)	Thala (TBA)

The original soundtrack is composed, programmed, and arranged by Ankit Menon. The album also includes a remastered version of the song 'Vaazhthidunnitha' from the 1993 Malayalam film Samagamam.

Track listing
No.	Title	Lyrics	Music	Singer(s)	Length
1.	"Ormakkaalame"	Vinayak Sasikumar	Ankit Menon	Benny Dayal	3:04
2.	"Thirike Varaam"	Sam Mathew	Ankit Menon	Parvatish Pradeep	4:17
3.	"Vaazhthidunnitha"	O. N. V. Kurup	Johnson	S. Janaki	4:19
Total length:					11:40
