= Krishna Sankar =

Indian actor

S. V. Krishna Sankar
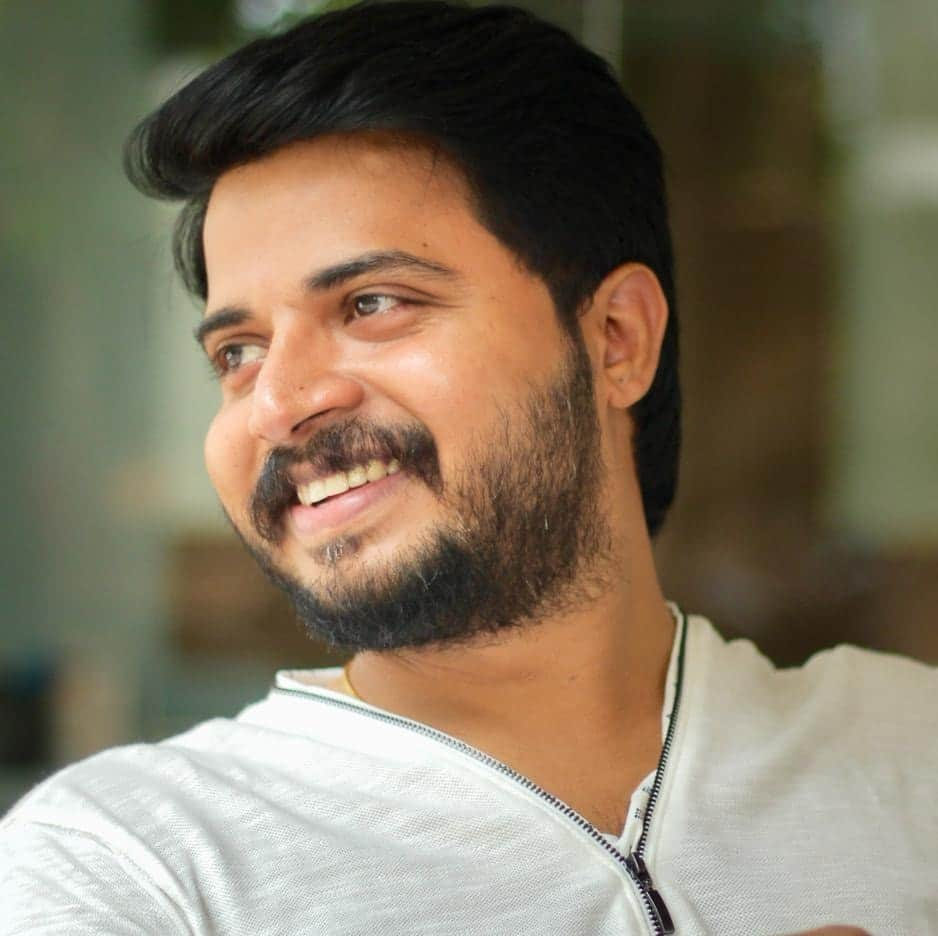
- Born: S. V. Krishna Shankar; Aluva, Kerala, India
- Education: MES College Marampally, Aluva
- Occupation: Actor
- Years active: 2013 – present
- Spouse: Neena (m. 2012)
- Children: 2

S. V. Krishna Sankar is an Indian actor who predominantly acts in Malayalam films. His notable films include Neram (2013), Premam (2015), Marubhoomiyile Aana (2016) and Njandukalude Nattil Oridavela (2017).

== Career ==
Krishna Shankar was born in Aluva, and attended MES College Marampally, Aluva. He debuted in the 2013 comedy-thriller film Neram directed by his friend Alphonse Puthren. In 2015, he starred in Puthren's second directorial Premam, starring alongside Nivin Pauly. In 2016, he starred in Marubhoomiyile Aana in which he played the lead role. He will act and produce his next film under his banner SVK Productions titled Kudukku 2025 alongside Durga Krishna.

== Filmography ==
Year	Title	Role	Notes
2013	Neram	Manick	Bilingual film
2013	Red Wine	Tony	
2014	Law Point	Abay	
2014	Bhaiyya Bhaiyya	Jayakrishnan Namboothiri	
2015	Premam	Koya	
2015	Waiting	Dr. Ravi	Hindi film
2016	Valleem Thetti Pulleem Thetti	Gagan	
2016	Marubhoomiyile Aana	Suku	
2017	Njandukalude Nattil Oridavela	Subbu	
2018	Aadhi	Nadhir	
2018	Thobama	Mammu	
2019	Allu Ramendran	Jithu	
2020	Mariyam Vannu Vilakkoothi	Rony	
2020	Maniyarayile Ashokan	Ratheesh	
2021	Mohan Kumar Fans	Prajeesh	
2022	Trojan		
2022	Kochaal	Kochaal	
2022	Kudukku 2025	Maaran	
2022	Gold	Baazi	
2023	Ayisha	Abid	
2023	Vaathil		
2023	Vellari Pattanam	Radhan	
2024	Pattapakal		
2025	Vadakkan	R. K. Ravi	
