= Mariyam Vannu Vilakkoothi =

Indian Malayalam-language Comedy thriller film

- First look poster
- Directed by: Jenith Kachappilly
- Written by: Jenith Kachappilly
- Produced by: Rajesh Augustine
- Starring: Siju Wilson; Krishna Shankar; Shabareesh Varma; Althaf Salim
- Cinematography: Sinoj P. Ayyappan
- Edited by: Appu N. Bhattathiri
- Music by: Wazim-Murali
- Production company: ARK Media
- Distributed by: Sree Senthil Pictures
- Release date: 31 January 2020
- Country: India
- Language: Malayalam

Mariyam Vannu Vilakkoothi (transl. Mariyam came and blew the lamp) is an Indian Malayalam-language stoner film written and directed by debutant Jenith Kachappilly and produced by Rajesh Augustine under the banner of ARK Media. The film starring Siju Wilson, Krishna Shankar, Shabareesh Varma and Althaf Salim, follows Unni and his friends who are staying as paying guests at Mariyamma's home. Debutants Wazim-Murali composed the music. Sidhartha Siva and Basil Joseph play other important roles.

The film was theatrically released on 31 January 2020.

== Plot ==
Three friends, all the way from their school days and are still together, working in the same company. The problems start when the trio decided to celebrate their colleague's birthday at the place where he stays as a paying guest.

== Cast ==
- Siju Wilson as Umman Koshi
- Krishna Shankar as Rony
- Shabareesh Varma as Balu
- Althaf Salim as Unnikrishnan Nambuthiri
- M. A. Shiyas as Addu
- Sethu Lakshmi as Mariyamma George (teacher)
- Irena Mihalkovich as Michelle
- Sidhartha Siva as Boss
- Baiju Santhosh as Subhash (SI)
- Basil Joseph as Pizza Delivery Boy
- Abu Salim as George (CI)

== Soundtrack ==
The songs and score are composed by debutants Wazim and Murali.

== Release ==
The film was theatrically released on 31 January 2020.
