= Njandukalude Nattil Oridavela =

- Theatrical release poster
- Directed by: Althaf Salim
- Written by: Althaf Salim; George Kora
- Based on: Njandukalude Nattil Oridavela by Chandramathi
- Produced by: Nivin Pauly
- Starring: Nivin Pauly; Siju Wilson; Shanthi Krishna; Lal; Srinda Arhaan; Aishwarya Lekshmi; Ahaana Krishna
- Cinematography: Mukesh Muraleedharan
- Edited by: Dileep Dennies
- Music by: Justin Varghese
- Production company: Pauly Jr. Pictures
- Distributed by: Chakkalakel Films
- Release date: 1 September 2017
- Running time: 132 minutes
- Country: India
- Language: Malayalam
- Box office: est. ₹20 crore (Kerala)

Njandukalude Nattil Oridavela (English: An interval in the land of Crabs) is a 2017 Indian Malayalam-language tragicomedy film directed and co-written by Althaf Salim (in his directorial debut). It stars Nivin Pauly, Siju Wilson, Shanthi Krishna, Lal, Ahaana Krishna, and Aishwarya Lekshmi. The film is based on writer Chandramathi's memoirs of the same name, which narrates her long fight with cancer. Co-written by George Kora, the film was produced by Nivin under his home banner, Pauly Jr. Pictures. Njandukalude Nattil Oridavela released on 1 September 2017. Shanthi Krishna won several awards including Filmfare Award for Best Supporting Actress – Malayalam. Aishwarya Lekshmi made her feature film debut through this film.

== Plot ==
Sheela worries that she is developing cancer after finding a lump on her body. She discloses this to her husband Chacko and they contact their eldest son Kurien, settled in London, and force him to come back home, still without disclosing the secret. Kurien misunderstands the rush to have him return to India as his part of his parents' efforts to arrange his marriage.

Chacko and Sheela decide to go for a checkup at Dr. Saiju's oncology clinic at Aster Medcity in Kochi, where Dr. Saiju tells them to come back after a few days when the results are available. Meanwhile, Kurien meets his old friend Subbu with whom he planned a supermarket chain but Subbu ended up being a supermarket owner on his own. A few days later, Dr. Saiju tells Sheela that she has Stage II breast cancer, but there isn't a problem and she can undergo chemotherapy. They realise they have to disclose the matter to the whole family including Kurien, their daughters Sarah and Mary, and son-in-law Tony Edayady.

Everybody in the family goes gloomy and agree on chemotherapy sessions and a lump removal surgery. In one of the chemotherapy sessions, as Chacko was petrified about going with Sheela, Kurien goes instead and there he meets Rachel in a funny situation. They then get to know each other and also that they have similar situations.

They meet occasionally and Rachel tricks Kurien by asking whether he wants to be her boyfriend. Kurien agrees but then realises she deceived him and decides not to marry. Meanwhile, Sheela starts losing her hair as a side effect. So, she trims her head and temporarily quits her lecturing job. They decide to get Sara engaged. During the occasion, Sara asks Kurien if their mother has the confidence to go through with the treatment. Kurien tells her Sara a story about her during the Gulf War in 1990. Iraqi soldiers invaded Kuwait and they escaped to India via Jordan without her confidence going down even by a little bit.

One day, she develops a fever and the children take her to the hospital thinking it to be serious, but she comes out fine and Kurien goes home alone where 'Appachan' (Grandfather) is alone. He asks for a piece of orange but as Kurien is obsessed with Lays, he decides to give him some Lays. As he bursts open the Lays packet, simultaneously the room blacks out with a deafening sound of the thunder outside. 80-year-old Appappan dies instantly in the sudden shock. After that the family plan for a trip to Kodaikanal and when they reach there, Kurien gets a call from the doctor. He smiles after attending the call, signifying that Sheela has been cured. The following scenes show flashbacks where each family member cries behind closed doors, hiding their tears from Sheela. The last scene of the movie shows Kurien crying and when Sheela calls him, he wipes his tears and goes. At the end of the film, Kurien marries Rachel.

== Cast ==
- Nivin Pauly as K. C. Kurien
- Siju Wilson as Tony
- Lal as K. C. Chacko
- Shanthi Krishna as Sheela Chacko
- Srinda Arhaan as Mary Tony
- Aishwarya Lekshmi as Rachel
- Ahaana Krishna as Sarah Chacko
- Baby Kalyani as Riya Tony
- K. L. Antony as Cheriyan "Chachan", Kurien's grandfather
- Mariamma Athiyalil as Kurien's grandmother (only photo)
- Saiju Kurup as Dr. Saiju
- Dileesh Pothan as Dr. Abraham
- Krishna Shankar as Subbu
- Sharaf U Dheen as Yesudas
- George Kora as Mathew
- Jayalakshmi as Lakshmi
- Vijay Suresh as Vijay
- Sidhartha Siva as Kurien's friend (Cameo appearance)
- Omana Ouseph as Tony's mother
- Shiny Rajan as Geetha
- Dr.Ramkumar as Rachel's father
- Harish as Security
- George V. as Lift operator
- Ashok Menon as Priest
- Dr. Ramesh as Rameshan
- Mukesh (cameo)
- Akshay Ramesh as Guy caught watching it.

== Production ==
Director Althaf Salim co-wrote the film with George Kora. Principal photography of the film began on 25 September 2016. Mukesh Muraleedharan was the cinematographer. The film is inspired from author Chandramathi's book of the same name, about her cancer survival. Althaf calls the film a dramedy, because it is "a family drama that deals with a pertinent social issue but told with lots of humour. That's why we like to call the film a dramedy". The film marks Shanthi Krishna's return to acting after a 19-year hiatus.

== Soundtrack ==
Njandukalude Nattil Oridavela

Soundtrack album by Justin Varghese
- Released: 1 September 2017
- Recorded: 2017
- Genre: Feature film soundtrack
- Length: 8:16

Justin Varghese has composed the music and background score in his feature film debut.

No.	Title	Lyrics	Artist(s)	Length
1.	"Enthaavo"	Santhosh Varma	Sooraj Santhosh	3:54
2.	"Nanavere"	Santhosh Varma	Tessa Chavara, Vipin Lal	4:22
Total length:				8:16

== Release ==
The film was released on 1 September 2017 in about 108 screens across Kerala during Onam.

=== Box office ===
The film was a commercial success. The film grossed around ₹20 crore from Kerala box office. The film collected ₹23.72 lakh (US$25,000) in its two weekends from Chennai box office. The film collected $33,825 and $667,344 from UK and UAE box office respectively from its first weekend.
