= Vidyasagar discography =

This is a discography of composer, record producer and multi-instrumentalist Vidyasagar.

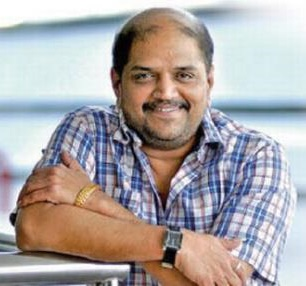
Vidyasagar at his residence in Chennai, India

== Original scores ==
=== 1980s ===
Year	Film	Language	Notes
1988	Paravaigal Palavitham	Tamil	Background Score Only
1989	Poo Manam	Tamil	
1989	Dharma Teja	Telugu	
1989	Sahasame Naa Oopiri	Telugu	

=== 1990s ===
Year	Film	Language	Notes
1990	Vishnu	Telugu	
1990	Seetha	Tamil	
1990	Nila Pennae	Tamil	
1990	Doshi Nirdoshi	Telugu	
1990	Alajadi	Telugu	
1990	Kadapa Reddamma	Telugu	
1990	Aatha Naan Pass Ayittaen	Tamil	
1991	Prema Entha Madhuram	Telugu	
1991	Sarpayagam	Telugu	
1991	Minor Raja	Telugu	
1991	Teneteega	Telugu	
1991	Parishkaram	Telugu	
1991	Kalikaalam	Telugu	
1991	Jagannatakam	Telugu	
1992	Allari Pilla	Telugu	
1992	Pachani Samsaram	Telugu	
1992	Chilara Mogudu Allari Koduku	Telugu	
1992	420	Telugu	
1992	Madhavayya Gari Manavadu	Telugu	
1992	Chitram Bhalare Vichitram	Telugu	
1993	One by Two	Telugu	
1993	Manavarali Pelli	Telugu	
1993	Alibaba Aradajanu Dongalu	Telugu	
1993	Urmila	Telugu	
1993	Maathangal Ezhu	Tamil	25th Film
1993	Enti Baava Mareenu	Telugu	
1993	Pillalu Diddina Kapuram	Telugu	
1993	Prema Chitram Pelli Vichitram	Telugu	
1993	Chirunavvula Varamistava	Telugu	
1993	Rowdy Annayya	Telugu	
1993	Asale Pellayinavaanni	Telugu	
1994	Donga Rascal	Telugu	
1994	Mugguru Monagallu	Telugu	
1994	Bangaru Mogudu	Telugu	
1994	Aame	Telugu	
1994	Allarodu	Telugu	
1994	Jai Hind	Tamil	
1995	Simha Garjana	Telugu	
1995	Vaddu Bava Thappu	Telugu	
1995	Chilakapachcha Kaapuram	Telugu	
1995	Karnaa	Tamil	
1995	Pasumpon	Tamil	
1995	Vetagadu	Telugu	
1995	Murai Maman	Tamil	
1995	Villadhi Villain	Tamil	
1995	Mr. Madras	Tamil	
1995	Ayudha Poojai	Tamil	50th Film
1995	Alibaba Adbuthadeepam	Telugu	
1996	Coimbatore Mappillai	Tamil	
1996	Mummy Mee Aayanochadu	Telugu	
1996	Azhakiya Ravanan	Malayalam	Kerala State Film Award for Best Music Director; Kerala Film Critics Award for Best Music Director; Nominated – Filmfare Award for Best Music Director
1996	Musthaffaa	Tamil	
1996	Mahathma	Malayalam	
1996	Sengottai	Tamil	
1996	Ladies Doctor	Telugu	
1996	Priyam	Tamil	
1996	Indraprastham	Malayalam	
1996	Subash	Tamil	
1996	Tata Birla	Tamil	
1996	Akkum Bakkum	Telugu	
1996	Nethaji	Tamil	
1997	Thaali	Telugu	
1997	Pudhayal	Tamil	
1997	Ganga Yamuna	Kannada	Remake of Shubhalagnam
1997	Mangalasutra	Kannada	
1997	Varnapakittu	Malayalam	
1997	Thaali Pudhusu	Tamil	
1997	Oru Maravathoor Kanavu	Malayalam	
1997	Mama Bagunnava	Telugu	
1997	Rukmini	Telugu	
1997	Krishnagudiyil Oru Pranayakalathu	Malayalam	Kerala Film Critics Award for Best Music Director; Nominated – Kerala State Film Award for Best Music Director; Nominated – Filmfare Award for Best Music Director
1997	Aahaa Enna Porutham	Tamil	75th Film
1997	Arasiyal	Tamil	
1997	Smile Please	Tamil	Not Released
1998	Pranayavarnangal	Malayalam	Kerala State Film Award for Best Music Director; Kerala Film Critics Award for Best Music Director; Asianet Film Award for Best Music Director
1998	Zor	Hindi	Background Score only.
1998	Gamyam	Telugu	
1998	Elavamkodu Desam	Malayalam	
1998	Sidhartha	Malayalam	
1998	Nilaave Vaa	Tamil	
1998	Veedu Samanyudu Kaadu	Telugu	
1998	Thayin Manikodi	Tamil	
1998	Summer in Bethlehem	Malayalam	Filmfare Award for Best Music Director
1998	Uyirodu Uyiraga	Tamil	
1998	Aayanagaru	Telugu	
1999	Ethirum Pudhirum	Tamil	
1999	Ustaad	Malayalam	
1999	Ezhupunna Tharakan	Malayalam	
1999	Suyamvaram	Tamil	One Song
1999	Chandranudikkunna Dikhil	Malayalam	Kerala Film Critics Award for Best Music Director
1999	Pooparika Varugirom	Tamil	
1999	Niram	Malayalam	Filmfare Award for Best Music Director; Kerala Film Critics Award for Best Music Director; Nominated – Kerala State Film Award for Best Music Director; Two songs were reused in the Telugu remake Nuvve Kavali

=== 2000s ===
Year	Film	Language	Notes
2000	Millennium Stars	Malayalam	
2000	Dreams	Malayalam	
2000	Sathyam Sivam Sundaram	Malayalam	
2000	Sanchalanam	Telugu	
2000	Balaram	Telugu	
2000	Mr. Butler	Malayalam	
2000	Daivathinte Makan	Malayalam	
2000	Madhuranombarakattu	Malayalam	
2000	Puratchikkaaran	Tamil	100th Film
2000	Snehithiye	Tamil	
2000	Devadoothan	Malayalam	Kerala State Film Award for Best Music Director; Nominated – National Film Award for Best Music Direction; Nominated – Filmfare Award for Best Music Director; Nominated – Asianet Film Award for Best Music Director
2001	Dhosth	Malayalam	Kerala Film Critics Award for Best Music Director; Nominated – Kerala State Film Award for Best Music Director; Nominated – Asianet Film Award for Best Music Director
2001	Dhill	Tamil	Tamil Nadu State Film Award for Best Music Director
2001	Poovellam Un Vasam	Tamil	Tamil Nadu State Film Award for Best Music Director
2001	Vedham	Tamil	
2001	Dubai	Malayalam	
2001	Alli Thandha Vaanam	Tamil	
2001	Randam Bhavam	Malayalam	
2001	Soori	Telugu	
2001	Thavasi	Tamil	Tamil Nadu State Film Award for Best Music Director
2002	O Chinadana	Telugu	
2002	Priya Nestama	Telugu	score only
2002	Gramaphone	Malayalam	
2002	Neetho	Telugu	
2002	Meesa Madhavan	Malayalam	Filmfare Award for Best Music Director; Kerala Film Critics Award for Best Music Director; Nominated – Kerala State Film Award for Best Music Director; Nominated – Asianet Film Award for Best Music Director
2002	Karmegham	Tamil	
2002	Run	Tamil	Nominated – Tamil Nadu State Film Award for Best Music Director
2002	Beyond the Soul	English	
2002	Villain	Tamil	
2003	Dhool	Tamil	Nominated – Filmfare Award for Best Music Director; Nominated – Tamil Nadu State Film Award for Best Music Director
2003	Naaga	Telugu	2 songs
2003	Anbe Sivam	Tamil	125th Film
2003	Anbu	Tamil	
2003	Pallavan	Tamil	
2003	Ottesi Cheputunna	Telugu	
2003	Kilichundan Mampazham	Malayalam	
2003	Well Done	Tamil	
2003	Parthiban Kanavu	Tamil	
2003	C.I.D. Moosa	Malayalam	
2003	Aahaa Ethanai Azhagu	Tamil	
2003	Kadhal Kisu Kisu	Tamil	
2003	Thithikudhe	Tamil	
2003	Dongodu	Telugu	Remake of Meesha Madhavan.
2003	Alai	Tamil	
2003	Pattalam	Malayalam	
2003	Thirumalai	Tamil	
2003	Iyarkai	Tamil	
2003	Villain	Telugu	
2003	Joot	Tamil	
2004	Love Today	Telugu	
2004	Thendral	Tamil	
2004	Varnajalam	Tamil	
2004	Nenu	Telugu	
2004	Ghilli	Tamil	
2004	Sullan	Tamil	150th Film
2004	Madhurey	Tamil	
2004	Swarabhishekam	Telugu	National Film Award for Best Music Direction; Nandi Award for Best Music Director
2004	Hulchul	Hindi	
2004	Rasikan	Malayalam	
2004	Nothing but Life	Malayalam	
2005	Ji	Tamil	
2005	London	Tamil	
2005	Alice in Wonderland	Malayalam	
2005	Chandramukhi	Tamil	
2005	Chandrolsavam	Malayalam	
2005	Kochi Rajavu	Malayalam	
2005	Kana Kandaen	Tamil	
2005	Power of Women	Tamil	
2005	Ponniyin Selvan	Tamil	
2005	Chanthupottu	Malayalam	
2005	Majaa	Tamil	
2006	Paramasivan	Tamil	
2006	Aathi	Tamil	
2006	Pasa Kiligal	Tamil	
2006	Thambi	Tamil	
2006	Bangaram	Telugu	
2006	Em Magan	Tamil	Three songs were reused in the Kannada remake Putra
2006	Sivappathigaram	Tamil	
2006	Poi	Tamil	
2007	Kaiyoppu	Malayalam	175th Film
2007	Raakilipattu	Malayalam	
2007	Mozhi	Tamil	Tamil Nadu State Film Award for Best Music Director; Nominated – Vijay Award for Best Music Director
2007	Periyar	Tamil	Volga River Side Film Festival Award
2007	Goal	Malayalam	
2007	Rock 'n' Roll	Malayalam	
2008	Pirivom Santhippom	Tamil	
2008	Sundarakanda	Telugu	
2008	Mulla	Malayalam	Asianet Film Award for Best Music Director; Vanitha Film Magazine Award For Best Music Direction; Nominated -Filmfare Award for Best Music Director
2008	Arai En 305-il Kadavul	Tamil	
2008	Kuruvi	Tamil	
2008	Mere Baap Pehle Aap	Hindi	All songs except for "Ishq Subhan Allah"
2008	Kaamannana Makkalu	Kannada	Remake of Thommanum Makkalum
2008	Muniyandi Vilangial Moonramandu	Tamil	
2008	Jeyam Kondaan	Tamil	
2008	Alibhabha	Tamil	
2008	Raman Thediya Seethai	Tamil	
2008	Ellam Avan Seyal	Tamil	
2008	Mahesh, Saranya Matrum Palar	Tamil	
2008	Abhiyum Naanum	Tamil	Composed one new song for Telugu version Aakasamantha
2009	Sasirekha Parinayam	Telugu	
2009	Kadhalna Summa Illai	Tamil	2 songs
2009	1977	Tamil	
2009	Peraanmai	Tamil	
2009	Kanden Kadhalai	Tamil	Nominated – Filmfare Award for Best Music Director
2009	Ilamai Itho Itho	Tamil	Not Released
2009	Neelathamara	Malayalam	200th Film; Filmfare Award for Best Music Director

=== 2010s ===
Year	Film	Language	Notes
2010	Paappi Appacha	Malayalam	
2010	Apoorva Ragam	Malayalam	
2010	Mandhira Punnagai	Tamil	
2010	Magizhchi	Tamil	
2011	Ilaignan	Tamil	
2011	Siruthai	Tamil	
2011	Kaavalan	Tamil	
2011	Makeup Man	Malayalam	
2011	Thambi Vettothi Sundaram	Tamil	
2011	Sadhurangam	Tamil	Delayed release, Filmed in 2003-06
2012	Spanish Masala	Malayalam	
2012	Vydooryam	Malayalam	
2012	Ordinary	Malayalam	
2012	Diamond Necklace	Malayalam	Filmfare Award for Best Music Director; Nominated —SIIMA Award for Best Music Director
2012	Uu Kodathara? Ulikki Padathara?	Telugu	1 song
2012	Thappana	Malayalam	
2013	3 Dots	Malayalam	
2013	Thalaivan	Tamil	
2013	Puthiya Thiruppangal	Tamil	
2013	Pullipulikalum Aattinkuttiyum	Malayalam	
2013	Nadodimannan	Malayalam	
2013	Geethaanjali	Malayalam	Kerala Film Producers Association Award for Best Music Director
2013	Jannal Oram	Tamil	Remake of Ordinary.
2013	Oru Indian Pranayakadha	Malayalam	Nominated —Asiavision Award for Best Music Director
2014	Bhaiyya Bhaiyya	Malayalam	225th Film
2015	Mariyam Mukku	Malayalam	
2015	Ennum Eppozhum	Malayalam	Nominated —Filmfare Award for Best Music Director; Nominated —Asiavision Award for Best Music Director
2015	Eli	Tamil	
2015	Anarkali	Malayalam	
2016	Uchathula Shiva	Tamil	
2016	Thoppil Joppan	Malayalam	
2016	Jomonte Suvisheshangal	Malayalam	
2017	Thiruttu Payale 2	Tamil	
2018	Aaruthra	Tamil	
2019	My Santa	Malayalam	

=== 2020s ===
Year	Film	Language	Notes
2022	Solamante Theneechakal	Malayalam	
2024	Double Tuckerr	Tamil	
2024	Uyir Thamizhukku	Tamil	
2024	Marivillin Gopurangal	Malayalam	
2025	Desingu Raja 2	Tamil	

=== Web series ===
Year	Title	Language	Platform
2024	My Perfect Husband	Tamil	Disney+ Hotstar

=== Non-film songs ===
Year	Song	Language	Notes
1998	Thiruvona Kaineettam	Malayalam	Tharangini's Onam album
2018	Makkal Needhi Maiam	Tamil	Written and sung by Kamal Haasan

== As singer ==
Year	Film	Song	Notes
1994	Jai Hind	"Thanni Vachu"	
1996	Nethaji	"Holey Holey", "Machamunna"	
1996	Subash	"Hey Saloma"	
1996	Tata Birla	"London Paris", "Are Bapre"	
1997	Rukmini	"Prema O Prema"	Telugu
1997	Pudhayal	"Baba Baba"	
1998	Nilaave Vaa	"Akkuthe Akkuthe"	
1999	Niram	"Yaathrayaay"	
1999	Ezhupunna Tharakan	"Thekku thekku"	Humming
2002	Kaarmegam	"Kaasu Padi Alantha"	
2007	Aagomai	"Gopal Guhali Parote"	Assamese; credited as Bidya Sagar
2008	Raman Thediya Seethai	"Enna Pulla Senja"	
2008	Arai En 305-il Kadavul	"Kaadhal Sei"	
2008	Kuruvi	"Palaanadhu"	
2012	101 Weddings	"Cheruchillayil"	Music: Deepak Dev
2017	Thiruttu Payale 2	"Thiruttu Payale"	
2025	Desingu Raja 2	"Pidari Koil"	

== Reused tunes ==
Remake films

Most are remakes of Malayalam films.

- Dongodu (2003) from Meesa Madhavan (2001) (4 songs)
- Kaamannana Makkalu (2008) from Majaa (2005; which itself is a remake of Thommanum Makkalum) (3 songs)
- Jannal Oram (2013) from Ordinary (2012) (1 song)

Apart from remake films, Vidyasagar has reused the following tracks:

Original version	Remade version	Notes	Ref.
"En Anbe" (Poomanam; 1989, Tamil)	"May Maasam" (Alice In Wonderland; 2005, Malayalam)		
"Adarale Pilla" (Madhavayya Gari Manavadu; 1992, Telugu)	"Pularipoo Penne" (Ennum Eppozhum; 2015, Malayalam)		
"Meetu Ennai" (Maathangal Ezhu; 1993, Tamil)	"Aaro Viral Neetti" (Pranayavarnangal, 1998, Malayalam)		
"Okate Korika" (Chirunavvula Varamistava; 1993, Telugu)	"Malare Mounama" (Karnaa; 1995, Tamil) "Olave Mounava" (Ganga Yamuna; 1997, Kannada)		
"Thamarai Poovukkum" (Pasumpon, 1995, Tamil)	"Ammadi Ammadi" (Ooriki Monagadu; 1995, Telugu), "Vannalo Veluva" (Balaram; 2000, Telugu) "Ishq Mein Pyar Mein" (Hulchul; 2004, Hindi)		
"Adi Aathi" (Pasumpon, 1995, Tamil)	"Chali Gali" (Ladies Doctor; 1996, Telugu)		
"Dheemthathakida" (Villadhi Villain; 1995, Tamil)	"Gumthalakkadi" (Thaali, 1997, Telugu)		
"Oh Na Ennanu" (Ayudha Poojai, 1995, Tamil)	"Oh Akashavani" (Ladies Doctor; 1996, Telugu)		
"Coimbatore Mappillaiku" (Coimbatore Mappillai, 1996, Tamil)	"Jaaru Paita" (Aayanagaru; 1998, Telugu)		
"Ulle Ullele" (Thaali; 1997, Telugu)	"Vulakku Le Le" (Aaha Enna Porutham; 1998, Tamil)		
"Poothirukum Maname" (Pudhayal; 1997, Tamil)	"Maalikeya" (Siddhartha; 1998, Malayalam)		
"Kannadi Koodum" (Pranayavarnangal; 1998, Malayalam)	"Mainave Mainave" (Thithikudhe; Tamil, 2003)		
"Oru Rathri Koodi" (Summer in Bethlehem; 1998, Malayalam)	"Malai Kaatru Vandhu" (Vedham; Tamil, 2001)		
"Havva Havva" (Sathyam Sivam Sundaram, 2000, Malayalam)	"Havva Havva" (O Chinadana; 2002, Telugu)		
"Walking In The Moonlight" (Sathyam Sivam Sundaram; 2000, Malayalam)	"Walking in" (Love Today; Telugu, 2004), "Kannal Pesum Penne" (Mozhi; Tamil, 2007)		
"Radhai Manadhil" (Snegithiye; 2000, Tamil)	"Dum Dum Dum" (Dongodu; Telugu, 2003)		
"Pudhu Malar" (Poovellam Un Vaasam; 2001, Tamil)	"Dhinnutara" (O Chinnadana; 2002, Telugu)		
"Thattama Peru" (Dosth; 2001, Malayalam)	"Navvale Neetho" (Neetho; 2002, Telugu)		
"Kadhal Vandhadhum" (Poovellam Un Vaasam, 2001, Tamil)	"Pannendintiki" (Neetho; 2002, Telugu)		
"Vaadi Vaadi" (Alli Thantha Vaanam; 2001, Tamil)	"Yelo Yelo Eluroda" (Ottesi Cheputunna; 2003, Telugu)		
"Panjangam Paakathe" (Thavasi; 2001, Tamil)	"Meesala Gopala" (Dongodu; 2003, Telugu)		
"Un Samayal Arayil" (Dhill; 2001, Tamil)	"Naa Gunde Gudilo" (Villain; 2003, Telugu)		
"Chingamasam" (Meesha Madhavan; 2002, Malayalam)	"Satham Podum" (Karmegham; 2003, Tamil)		
"Panikaatrey" (Run; 2002, Tamil)	"Hum Dil Ke" (Hulchul; 2004, Hindi)	Original only present in the film's soundtrack	
"Karimizhi Kuruviye" (Meesha Madhavan; 2002, Malayalam) "Aasai Aasai" (Dhool; 2003, Tamil)	"Rafta Rafta" (Hulchul; 2004, Hindi)		
"Ithanundu Muthathile" (Dhool; 2003, Tamil)	"Entha Chinna Muddu" (Naaga; 2003, Telugu)		
"Koduva Meesai" (Dhool; 2003, Tamil)	"Anakapalli Centrelo" (Naaga; 2003, Telugu)		
"Sillendra Theepori" (Thittikudhe; 2003, Tamil)	"Cheppave" (Love Today; 2004, Telugu)		
"Kandum Kanamal" (Pirivom Santhippom; 2007, Tamil)	"Dooram Kaavala" (Aakasamantha; 2009, Telugu)		
