= List of films directed by Lal Jose featuring Vidyasagar =

This is a list of Malayalam movies made by the Indian director Lal Jose featuring the Indian music composer Vidyasagar.

== History ==
Lal Jose began his career by assisting noted director Kamal. Vidyasagar's first Malayalam film Azhakiya Ravanan was directed by Kamal. Lal Jose was also the assistant director of the film.

In 1998, he made his debut as an independent director with Oru Maravathoor Kanavu, which starred Mammootty and was scripted by Sreenivasan. Lal Jose asked Vidyasagar to compose for his film. The huge success Oru Maravathoor Kanavu earned him a positive reputation. The songs became very popular. Vidyasagar made a Christian devotional song Karunamayane in the movie, it was well appreciated by the audience and critics.

In 1999, his second directorial venture Chandranudikkunna Dikhil was released. The songs of the film was regarded as the best songs of Malayalam cinema in that year. Lal Jose worked with Vidyasagar for his first seven films continuously. all those films and songs were successful. Vidyasagar has won several awards for his compositions.

== List of films ==
Key
| † | Denotes films that have not yet been released |

| Year | Film | Awards |
|---|---|---|
| 1998 | Oru Maravathoor Kanavu | Nominated - Kerala Film Critics Award for Best Music Director; Nominated - Kerala State Film Award for Best Music Director |
| 1999 | Chandranudikkunna Dikhil | Kerala Film Critics Award for Best Music Director; Asianet Film Award for Best Music Director |
| 2001 | Randam Bhavam | |
| 2002 | Meesa Madhavan | Filmfare Award for Best Music Director; Kerala Film Critics Award for Best Music Director; Nominated - Kerala State Film Award for Best Music Director; Nominated - Asianet Film Award for Best Music Director |
| 2003 | Pattalam | Kerala Film Critics Award for Best Music Director; Nominated - Asianet Film Award for Best Music Director; Nominated - Kerala State Film Award for Best Music Director |
| 2004 | Rasikan | |
| 2005 | Chanthupottu | Kerala Film Critics Award for Best Music Director; Nominated - Asianet Film Award for Best Music Director |
| 2008 | Mulla | Asianet Film Award for Best Music Director; Vanitha Film Magazine Award For Best Music Direction; Nominated - Filmfare Award for Best Music Director; Nominated - Kerala State Film Award for Best Music Director |
| 2009 | Neelathamara | Filmfare Award for Best Music Director; Kerala Film Critics Award for Best Music Director; Nominated - Kerala State Film Award for Best Music Director; Nominated - Asianet Film Award for Best Music Director |
| 2012 | Spanish Masala | |
| 2012 | Diamond Necklace | Filmfare Award for Best Music Director; Nominated - SIIMA Award for Best Music Director; Nominated - Kerala State Film Award for Best Music Director |
| 2013 | Pullipulikalum Aattinkuttiyum Immanuel | Nominated - Asianet Film Award for Best Music Director |
| 2022 | Solamante Theneechakal | |
| TBA | Oru Bhayankara Kaamukan | Announced |
