= Spanish Masala =

- Theatrical release poster
- Directed by: Lal Jose
- Written by: Benny P. Nayarambalam
- Produced by: Noushad
- Starring: Dileep; Kunchacko Boban; Biju Menon; Daniela Zacherl; Javier Sandoval; Nelson Sooranad; Nivin Pauly; Archana Kavi
- Cinematography: Loganathan Srinivasan
- Edited by: Ranjan Abraham
- Music by: Vidyasagar
- Production company: Big Screen Productions
- Distributed by: Plaza Group Release
- Release date: 20 January 2012
- Running time: 160 minutes
- Country: India
- Language: Malayalam
- Budget: ₹14 crore
- Box office: ₹4.60 crore (US$480,000)

Spanish Masala is a 2012 Indian romantic comedy film directed by Lal Jose. The film stars Dileep, Kunchacko Boban, Biju Menon, Daniela Zacherl, Javier Sandoval and Nelson Sooranad. With Nivin Pauly and Archana Kavi In Cameo appearance.In the film, Charlie, an impressionist works at an Indian restaurant in Spain, he becomes close to his employer's blind daughter by imitating her lost boyfriend's voice and tries to reunite them. Spanish Masala was released on 20 January 2012 to positive reviews from critics and the film became a flop at the box office.

== Plot ==
The story is set in Spain, and revolves around Charlie, an illegal immigrant stranded in Madrid. To make things worse, he is conversant only in Malayalam. He gets a job as a cook in an Indian restaurant, as he has some experience in running a roadside eatery in his homeland, run by an expatriate, Majid. In the restaurant he is assigned with the task of serving up various types of dosa and, he comes up with a local variant named Spanish Masala. This turns out to be his passport to employment in the home of an ex-diplomat, who had earlier served in India.

There he meets the diplomat's daughter Camilla, who is visually impaired. She becomes a big time fan of Charlie's Spanish Masala. She is not on talking terms with her father, who is believed to have killed her Indian lover, Rahul, the son of her Malayali nanny, from whom she has learnt to speak Malayalam. Later Camilla starts to get closer to Charlie. Since he can imitate impersonate voices, one servant Pappan leads him to imitate Rahul's voice and keep Rahul's memory alive.

After some days, she recovers and her eyesight returns, but now her father is no more. A strange incident occurs when Rahul arrives for his funeral. One day, as per Menon's instruction, Charlie cleans Señor's (Camilla's dad) room. He finds a CD which Señor had seen before he died, and from that he finds out that Rahul was sent to Portugal to avoid the relationship between Camilla and Rahul, by paying him money by Señor. Again Rahul is spared by Charlie.

As it goes, one day Menon enters a bar where he sees Rahul and another girl dancing together. He went to interrogate about it by following him, when he saw Rahul sitting with some goons and the girl. Later he researched it, when he discovered it wasn't a good life for Rahul in Portugal. He sold the factory which Señor offered him and he had taken a loan from some goons for gambling and could not repay them. Camilla heard about it and she felt sorrow that she was keeping a crooked lover in her mind. Later Camilla and Menon return to Kerala, India to fix marriage between Charlie and Camilla.

== Cast ==
- Dileep as Charlie, an impressionist and cook
  - Sidharth Madhav as Young Charlie
- Kunchacko Boban as Rahul, Camila's ex-lover
- Biju Menon as Menon, Philip De Albe's Manager
- Daniela Zacherl as Camilla De Albey, a blind Spanish girl
- Javier Sandoval as Spanish ambassador Philp De Albey, Camilla's father
- Nelson Sooranad as Pappan, an employee at Philp De Albe's Palace
- Chrys Hobbs as Maria de Albey, sister of Philip
- Clemens Berndorff as Fernado, son of Maria De Albey
- Nivin Pauly as Mathews, Charlie's Brother-in-Law (Cameo Appearance)
- Archana Kavi as Lilly, Charlie's Sister (Cameo Appearance)
- Raquel Ameghashie as Jennifer, wife of Pappan
- Vinaya Prasad as Margaret, Rahul's mother
- Kalaranjini as Theresa, Charlie's mother
- Sivaji Guruvayoor as Joseph, Charlie's father
- Nandhu Pothuval as Troupe Manager, Ravi Kothadu
- Majeed as Varghese Maash, Charlie's Teacher
- Niyas Backer as Abdu, a Mimicry Artist
- Gopalan Adattu as Majeed, Owner of Indian Restaurant in Madrid
- Njarakkal George as Villager
- Nandhan Chaliserry as Villager
- Franco Simon as himself (cameo)

== Production ==
Most of the film was shot in Madrid, with one song shot in Vienna, and the remainder scenes in Cochin and Alappuzha districts of Kerala. The film portrays several Spanish arts, festivals and sports such as bullfighting, flamenco dance and La Tomatina which was the real la tomatina festival shot for the first time in Indian cinema. Daniela Zacherl, the female lead, is an Austrian model. She replaced Amy Jackson who had to drop out due to conflicts with Ekk Deewana Tha.

== Music ==
Spanish Masala

Soundtrack album by Vidyasagar
- Released: 13 December 2011
- Recorded: Varsha Vallaki Studios
- Genre: Feature film soundtrack
- Length: 24:26
- Label: Satyam Audios
- Producer: Vidyasagar

Vidyasagar chronology
Thambi Vettothi Sundaram (2011)	Spanish Masala (2011)	Ordinary (2012)

The audio launch was done on 14 December at IMA Hall in Kochi. Song composer was Vidyasagar, the lyrics are penned by R. Venugopal. The soundtrack was rated 6/10 by Music Aloud.

No.	Song	Singers
1	"Akkare Ninnoru"	Vineeth Sreenivasan, Sujatha Mohan
2	"Aareyuthiyaavo"	Karthik, Shreya Ghoshal
3	"Hayyo Hayyo"	Yazin Nizar, Franco
4	"Irulil Oru"	Udit Narayan, Vidyasagar
5	"Irulil Oru"	Karthik, Udit Narayan
5	"Omana"	Nikita Balasubramanian
