= Ordinary (film) =

- Theatrical release poster
- Directed by: Sugeeth
- Screenplay by: Nishad Koya; Manu Prasad
- Story by: Sugeeth
- Produced by: Rajeev Nair
- Starring: Kunchacko Boban; Biju Menon; Shritha Sivadas; Asif Ali; Ann Augustine; Jishnu Raghavan
- Cinematography: Faisal Ali
- Edited by: V. Saajan; Sangeeth Kollam
- Music by: Vidyasagar
- Production company: Magic Moon Productions
- Distributed by: Kalasangham Films; Kas & Right
- Release date: 17 March 2012 (Kerala)
- Running time: 145 minutes
- Country: India
- Language: Malayalam
- Budget: ₹3.3 crore
- Box office: est. ₹20 crore

Ordinary is a 2012 Indian Malayalam-language comedy thriller film directed by Sugeeth (in his directorial debut) and written by Nishad K. Koya and Manu Prasad. The film stars Kunchacko Boban, Biju Menon, Asif Ali and Shritha Sivadas. The music was composed by Vidyasagar. The film follows the life of a driver and conductor of a KSRTC bus that travels from Pathanamthitta to the village of Gavi, Kerala via Angamoozhy.

The film was released in India on 17 March 2012, and received positive response from audience. A blockbuster at the box office, the film was remade in Tamil as Jannal Oram by Karu Pazhaniappan and in Telugu as Right Right.

== Plot ==
Iravi Kuttan Pillai, from Thrissur, is hired by KSRTC as a bus conductor and assigned the Pathanamthitta–Gavi route for his first posting. Gavi is a picturesque small village inside a forest with a small local population, many of whom travel daily to Pathanamthitta for work. Situated near the reservoir of a dam, the village charms him, and he quickly adapts to his new life. He befriends the locals and falls in love with a native of the village, Kalyani.

Everything goes well for him, until one fateful day, the bus breaks down en route to Gavi. The passengers are provided with alternative transport and servicemen are called in for the repairs. The bus driver Suku, from Palakkad, gets drunk with a friend during the repairs, making him unable to drive. Iravi has to replace him to take the bus back to Gavi, although unauthorized to do so. Dim lighting of the evening, fog and distractions from his conversations with Suku make him late to see a person standing in the road. The brakes are applied too late, and the bus presumably hits him. In the panic of the situation and unable to think straight, they send the bleeding victim in a pickup truck that arrived soon after. They lie about the accident, claiming it to be a hit-and-run, while the driver takes him to hospital. One of the bags of the victim gets misplaced and they take it with them.

Guilt-ridden, Iravi along with Suku, search the victim's bag and recognize him to be Devan – the son of Venu master (a retired well-respected school headmaster and Gavi panchayat member ) and the fiancé of Anna, his childhood friend. He works in Surat, Gujarat and is to be married during his current visit. They search for him the next day in the hospitals, but is staggered to know that he is not admitted anywhere. Two days later, the police find his corpse at the bottom of hill, seemingly jumped off of the cliff. Without any other leads, the police believe it to be a suicide, but the two know otherwise. Iravi wishes to confess, but is prevented by Suku, as his sister's marriage is near. He assures to do so, immediately after the marriage.

They search for the truck driver, but to no avail. Meanwhile, Anna finds Devan's bag with Iravi through Kalyani, who mistakes the bag to be his. Iravi's grief leads him to confess, taking the blame entirely to himself. He is arrested and the police does not take into consideration the story of the truck driver. Suku is left free of charge as Iravi confessed even to his part. Suku continues with the search and tracks him down. Iravi gets bail and both of them capture him. They learn that the crime was committed by Bhadran – Devan's best friend since childhood.

Bhadran is the local handyman of the village and the shutter operator of the dam's reservoir. During his childhood, his father had committed suicide in the dam, for the grief of his wife eloping with someone. Bhadran had an eccentric odd character – aimless, unrelenting to act as per his wishes, lonely in his ways, but friendly with the village people. The villagers know him as a good fellow with a peculiar attitude. He had loved Anna since childhood, known to none – even to his best friend. He secretly admired her, even when she was engaged to Devan. On his visit, Devan called Bhadran, who came with the truck driver, to take him home. In a fit of rage, Bhadran attacks Devan. But the sight of the bus foiled his plans. The bus, while not hitting him, could not save him as Devan was taken by the truck driver who is unknown to both of them. Bhadran along with the driver kill him, faking it as a suicide. Later, he pretends to be shocked by Devan's death and then turning violent at Iravi while he made his confession.

Bhadran tries to capture Anna and escape with her, but is cornered on top of the dam. He then holds Anna hostage to try to escape. With no way out and rejection from Anna (on learning about the facts), he jumps off the dam and commits suicide. In time, Iravi is shown married to Kalyani, Anna got over Devan and is now married to Jose master. Suku and Iravi are now in different places. The end-credits shows them assigned together on a new common route.

== Cast ==
- Kunchacko Boban as Iravi Kuttan Pillai: A KSRTC conductor from Thrissur. Kalyani's lover turned husband and Suku's best friend
- Biju Menon as Suku: A KSRTC driver from Palakkad, Iravi's best friend
- Ann Augustine as Anna: A native of Gavi and a postwoman; Devan's ex-fiancé and Jose's wife
- Asif Ali as Bhadran: A native of Gavi; Anna's obsessive lover. The main antagonist
- Jishnu Raghavan as Jose Mash: A native of Gavi and a teacher; Anna's husband (voice-over by Jis Joy)
- Shritha Sivadas as Kalyani: Iravi's lover turned wife
- Hemanth Menon as Devan: Venu Mash's son and Anna's ex-fiancé
- Lalu Alex as Venu Mash: A native of Gavi, panchayat member and Devan's father
- Ambika Mohan as Sharada: Devan's mother
- Baburaj as Vakkachan: A frequent passenger of the Gavi-visiting KSRTC bus
- Salim Kumar as Ashaan: A drunken bus mechanic
- Dharmajan Bolgatty as Anttappan: Iravi's friend
- Chemban Vinod Jose as CI Habeeb Rahman (voice-over by Shobi Thilakan)
- Kochu Preman as Peethambaran: Ex-panchayat president
- Narayanankutty as KSRTC staff
- Joju George as Sebastian
- Raghavan as Priest
- T. P. Madhavan as Bhargavan
- Sreedevi Unni as Lalitha, Iravi's mother
- Kalamandalam Radhika as Jose's mother
- Bindu Murali as Kalyani's mother
- Vaigha Rose as Latha
- Niyas Backer as KPAC. Chandran
- Archana Menon as Shanthi: A sex worker
- Prasanth Alexander as Velayudhan, Jeep driver and Bhadran's friend
- Nimisha Suresh as Bus conductress (Guest appearance)
- Sreenivasan as Narrator (Voice-only)
- Baby Sandra

== Production ==
Shritha Sivadas made her movie debut in this film.

== Soundtrack ==
Ordinary

Soundtrack album by Vidyasagar
- Released: 4 March 2012
- Recorded: Varsha Vallaki Studios
- Genre: Feature film soundtrack
- Length: 25:04
- Language: Malayalam
- Label: Satyam Audios
- Producer: Vidyasagar

Vidyasagar chronology
Spanish Masala (2012)	Ordinary (2012)	Diamond Necklace (2012)

The soundtrack of the film was composed by Vidyasagar, with all the lyrics written by producer Rajeev Nair. The soundtrack album was released on 4 March 2012 at Gold Souk Mall in Kochi, India.

No.	Title	Singers(s)	Length
1.	"Enthinee Mizhi"	Karthik, Shreya Ghoshal	4:50
2.	"Sun Sun Sundari"	Karthik, Madhu Balakrishnan	4:21
3.	"Suryasalabham"	K. J. Yesudas	4:58
4.	"Karutha Munthiri"	Vidyadharan	1:54
5.	"Chenthamara"	Anusri, Vinayak Sunder, Vaishali Unnikrishnan, Geo Jomin Shaji, George, Maria Jemi Shaji, Rosella, Kingini, Blassy, Ardra, Divya Sabu	2:56
6.	"Thechippoo mantharam"	Tippu, Biju Narayanan, Sujatha, Sannidanandan	5:20
7.	"Kanju Poyenteyee"	Vidyadharan	1:35
Total length:			25:04

== Reception ==
=== Critical reception ===
A critic from The Hindu wrote that "A lot of things work for 'Ordinary' while the crucial elements of suspense and the build-up towards the climax leave much to be desired." A critic at The Times of India wrote, "A simple film about the close friendship between the conductor and driver of a lone bus to a distant village, it knows its limits, offers lively moments, bewitching visuals and has a neat climax." IndiaGlitz rated the film 3.25 out of 5 and said "All in all, 'Ordinary' is definitely a watchable flick for the families and the youth, for its freshness and simplicity in storytelling and treatment."

=== Box office ===
The film was a commercial success. The film ran for over 150 days in theatres and grossed a total of ₹20 crore from the box office.

The Times of India determined that the film was an "extraordinary hit".

=== Home videos ===
In July 2012, the DVD of the movie was released by Movie channel Home Entertainment followed by the Blu-ray release. The satellite rights of the movie was acquired by Surya TV.

== Awards and nominations ==
Year	Award	Category	Recipients	Result
2012	Asianet Film Awards	Best Negative role	Asif Ali	Won
2012	Asianet Film Awards	Best Character Actor	Biju Menon	Won
2013	Filmfare Awards South	Best Supporting Actor	Biju Menon	Won
2013	South Indian International Movie Awards	Best Female Debutant	Shritha Sivadas	Nominated
