= Biju Menon =

Indian actor

- Menon in 2022
- Born: 9 September 1970 (age 56); Thrissur, Kerala, India
- Education: St. Thomas College, Thrissur
- Occupation: Actor
- Years active: 1995–present
- Spouse: Samyuktha Varma (m. 2002)
- Children: 1
- Awards: Kerala State Film Awards (1997, 2010, 2021); National Film Award for Best Supporting Actor (2022)

Biju Menon (born 9 September 1970) is an Indian actor who predominantly appears in Malayalam films, and also has a few Tamil, Telugu and Kannada film credits. He made his debut in the 1995 Malayalam film Puthran. In a career spanning over three decades, he has appeared in more than 150 films, and has won one National film award for Best Supporting Actor, three Kerala State Film Awards including one best actor, two Filmfare Awards South and nine Asianet Film Awards. He got the Kerala State Film Award for Best Actor in 2021 for the film Aarkkariyam.

Biju Menon's popular characters were in films such as Mannar Mathai Speaking (1995), Azhakiya Ravanan (1996), Krishnagudiyil Oru Pranayakalathu (1997), Pathram (1999), Kannezhuthi Pottum Thottu (1999), Madhuranombarakattu (2000), Meghamalhar (2001), Shivam (2002), and T. D. Dasan Std. VI B (2010).

He shifted to comedic from serious roles, beginning from 2010 and played several notable roles in films such as Marykkundoru Kunjaadu (2010), Seniors (2011), Ordinary (2012), Run Baby Run (2012), Romans (2013), Vellimoonga (2014), Anarkali (2015), Leela (2016),Rakshadhikari Baiju Oppu (2017), Sherlock Toms (2017), Adhyarathri (2019), and Ayyappanum Koshiyum (2020).

== Early life ==
Biju Menon was born on 9th September 1970 to Madathiparambil P. N. Balakrishna Pillai and Malathiyamma Menon. His father was a police officer. He has four brothers: Soman, Suresh, Rajendran, and Sreekumar.

Menon did his schooling at J.T.S. Technical High School in Thrissur. He then pursued a degree in Commerce from St. Thomas College, Thrissur. He also holds a master's in Social Work (MSW).

== Acting career ==
Biju Menon started his acting career through Malayalam television serials such as Ningalude Swantham Chanthu, Parudeesayilekulla Patha and Mikhayelinte Santhathikal. He made his debut in films with Puthran, the debut film of Jude Attipetty and the sequel of Mikhayelinte Santhathikal. He acted in a number of movies as the villain or the secondary hero. During the late 1990s, he was considered to be a superstar in making. But most of the films with Biju Menon as the hero failed at the box office, in spite of his good performance, though his roles as second hero were popular. He acted with Suresh Gopi in hit movies like Pathram, F. I. R. and Chinthamani Kolacase. During the later 1990s and early 2000s he appeared in a few offbeat movies with directors like T. V. Chandran, Lenin Rajendran and Kamal in the films Mazha, Madhuranombarakkattu, Anyar and Meghamalhar.

He has appeared in the majority of the films made by director Lal Jose, including Oru Maravathoor Kanavu, Chandranudikkunna Dikhil, Randaam Bhavam, Pattalam, Rasikan, Chanthupottu, Mulla and Spanish Masala. He won the Kerala State Film Award for Second Best Actor twice in his acting career for his roles as Akhilachandran in Krishnagudiyil Oru Pranayakalathu (1997) and Nanda Kumar in T. D. Dasan Std. VI B(2010). He has also acted as antagonist in Tamil films and has been successful in films like Majaa and Thambi. In May 2018, he proved his versatility as a stage artist and singer in Madhuram 18 Mega Stage Show performing in 15 stages in U.S.A and Canada.

== Personal life ==
Menon is married to the former Malayalam actress Samyuktha Varma, on 21 November 2002, who co-starred with him in Mazha, Madhuranombarakkattu and Meghamalhar. The couple has a son, Daksh Dharmik, born on 14 September 2006.

== Filmography ==
Key
†	Denotes films that have not yet been released

=== As actor ===
==== Malayalam ====
Key
†	Denotes films that have not yet been released

Year	Title	Role	Notes
1995	Puthran	Alosys	
1995	Samudayam		
1995	Highway	Pavitran	
1995	Mannar Mathai Speaking	Mahendra Varma	
1995	Aadyathe Kanmani	Padmarajan	
1995	Karma	Sreekuttan	
1996	Mahathma	Mustafa	
1996	Azhakiya Ravanan	Sharath	
1996	Dilliwala Rajakumaran	Veerendran	
1996	Kanjirappally Kuriachan	Roy	
1996	Manthrika Kuthira		
1996	Malayala Masam Chingam Onnu	Dr.Prasad	
1996	Man of the Match	Rajendran	
1996	Sathyabhamakkoru Premalekhanam	Sethumadhavan	
1996	Udhyanapalakan	Mohan	
1996	Ee Puzhayum Kadannu	Gopi's friend	
1997	Kudamattom	Pankajakshan	
1997	Manasam	Jayadevan / Sudhakaran (Dual Role)	
1997	Krishnagudiyil Oru Pranayakalathu	Akhilachandran	Kerala State Film Award for Second Best Actor
1997	Asuravamsam	Jayamohan	
1997	Innalekalillaathe	Tony	
1997	Kaliyattam	Kanthan	
1998	Mangalya Pallakku	Dinesh	
1998	Pranayavarnangal	Victor	
1998	Sidhartha	Sethu	
1998	Pathram	Firoz Mohammed	Asianet Film Award for Best Supporting Actor
1998	Oru Maravathoor Kanavu	Michael	
1998	Oro Viliyum Kathorthu	Kesavan Kutty	
1998	Chitrashalabham	Dr.Sandeep	
1998	Kannezhuthi Pottum Thottu	Uthaman	Asianet Film Award for Best Supporting Actor
1998	Ormacheppu	Mohan	
1998	Sneham	Sasidharan Nair	
1999	Chandranudikkunna Dikhil	Radha's husband	
1999	F.I.R	Gregory	
2000	Millennium Stars	Shivan	Asianet Film Award for Best Supporting Actor
2000	Mazha	Sastrigal	
2000	Madhuranombarakattu	Vishnu	
2000	Cover Story	ACP Anand S. Nair	Asianet Film Award for Best Supporting Actor
2000	Karunam		
2001	Dubai	Kiran Pothan Cherian	
2001	Randaam Bhavam	Jeevan	
2001	Achaneyanenikkishtam	Anand	
2001	Meghamalhar	Rajeeev Menon	Asianet Film Award for Best Star Pair
2001	Praja	Arjun	
2002	Onnaman	ACP Vishnu S. Pillai	
2002	Shivam	Bhadran K. Menon	
2002	Sesham	Shyam Sundar IAS	
2003	Relax	Sankarapandi	
2003	Chronic Bachelor	Hareendran	
2003	Anyar	Suraj Nambiar	
2003	Pattalam	Benny	
2003	Ivar	Pambu Jose	
2004	Agninakshathram	Aniyan	
2004	Soumyam		
2004	Perumazhakkalam	John Kuruvila	
2004	Rasikan	Kapil Dev	
2005	Chanthupottu	Freddy	
2005	Anandabhadram	Siva Ram	
2006	Chinthamani Kolacase	Jagannivasan	
2006	Vadakkumnadhan	Prabhakara Pisharadi	
2006	Kisan	Devendra Varma	
2006	Ammathottil		
2006	Keerthi Chakra	Gopinath	
2006	Photographer	Forest Minister	
2006	Baba Kalyani	CI Thomas	
2007	Bharathan Effect	Bharathan	
2007	Heart Beats	Police Commissioner	
2007	Nagaram	Dr Raveendran	
2007	Kichamani MBA	Devanarayanan	
2007	Nasrani	Xavier Paul	
2008	Mulla	Ambi	Nominated – Filmfare Award for Best Supporting Actor – Malayalam
2008	Kurukshetra	Major Rajesh	
2008	Twenty:20	ASP Jacob Eraly	
2008	Crazy Gopalan	Police Commissioner	
2009	Red Chillies	Stalin	
2009	Vilapangalkkappuram	Dr. Gopinath	
2009	Daddy Cool	Roy Alex	
2009	Kaana Kanmani	Rajeevan	
2009	Robinhood	Nandakumara Menon	
2009	Parayan Marannathu	Chandrasekharan	
2010	Aagathan	Dr. Sudhi	
2010	April Fool	Sharath	
2010	Janakan	Monayi	
2010	T. D. Dasan Std. VI B	Nandakumar Pothuval	Kerala State Film Award for Second Best Actor
2010	Raama Raavanan	SP Surya Narayanan	
2010	Pranchiyettan and the Saint	Joppan	
2010	Kaaryasthan	Jayashankar	
2010	College Days	Sudeep Hariharan	
2010	Marykkundoru Kunjaadu	Jose	Filmfare Award for Best Supporting Actor – Malayalam
2011	Arjunan Saakshi	Aby Abraham	
2011	Khaddama	Radhakrishnan	
2011	Christian Brothers	Hariharan Thampy	
2011	Seniors	Philip Idikulla	Asianet Film Award for Best Character Actor
2011	Ulakam Chuttum Valiban	Saajan Joseph	
2011	Snehaveedu	Balachandran	Asianet Film Award for Best Character Actor
2011	Venicile Vyapari	Ajayan	
2011	Electra	Peter	
2012	Spanish Masala	Menon	
2012	Orange	Baboottan	
2012	Masters	Sethu	
2012	Ordinary	Suku	Asianet Film Award for Best Character Actor; Filmfare Award for Best Supporting Actor – Malayalam; Nominated—SIIMA Award for Best Comedian
2012	Mayamohini	Balakrishnan	
2012	Mallu Singh	Karthi	
2012	Mr. Marumakan	Babu Raj	
2012	Run Baby Run	Rishikesh	Asianet Film Award for Best Character Actor
2012	Ithra Mathram	Vasudevan	
2012	101 Weddings	Aantappan	
2012	Chettayees	Kichu	
2013	Romans	Shibu / Fr. Sebastian a.k.a. Fr. Sebu	
2013	3 Dots	Louis	
2013	5 Sundarikal	Jonathan Antony	
2013	Kalimannu	Shyam	
2013	Kadhaveedu	Balachandran	
2014	Mannar Mathai Speaking 2	Mahendra Varma/Hareendra Varma	
2014	Pakida	George Koshi Andrapper	
2014	Hi I'm Tony	Samuel	
2014	Bhaiyya Bhaiyya	Babulal Chatterji	
2014	Vellimoonga	Mamachan	Asianet Film Award for Best Popular Actor
2015	Madhura Naranga	Salim	
2015	Kunjiramayanam	Manoharan	Cameo appearance; also narrator
2015	Salt Mango Tree	Aravind TP	
2015	Anarkali	Zachariah	Asianet Film Award for Best Character Actor
2016	Leela	Kuttiyappan	
2016	Marubhoomiyile Aana	Sheikh	
2016	Anuraga Karikkin Vellam	Raghu	Asianet Film Award for Best Character Actor
2016	Kochavva Paulo Ayyappa Coelho	Airline Passenger	Cameo appearance
2016	Olappeeppi	Unni Menon	
2016	Swarna Kaduva	Rini Iype Maatummel	
2016	Kavi Uddheshichathu..?	Minnal Simon	
2017	Rakshadhikari Baiju Oppu	Baiju Kumbalam	
2017	Lakshyam	Mustafa	
2017	Sherlock Toms	Toms	
2017	Lava Kusha	Joy Cappan	
2018	Rosapoo	Shanu	
2018	Orayiram Kinakkalal	Sreeram	
2018	Padayottam	Chengal Raghu	
2018	Aanakallan	Pavithran	
2019	Mera Naam Shaji	Shaji Usman	
2019	Sathyam Paranja Viswasikkuvo?	Suni	
2019	Adhyarathri	Manoharan	
2019	Nalpathiyonnu (41)	Ullas	
2020	Ayyappanum Koshiyum	Ayyappan Nair	National Film Award for Best Supporting Actor
2021	Aarkkariyam	Ittyavira	Kerala State Film Award for Best Actor
2022	Lalitham Sundaram	Sunny	Disney+ Hotstar film
2022	Oru Thekkan Thallu Case	Ammini Pilla	
2022	Naalam Mura	Jayaraj	
2023	Thankam	Muthu	
2023	Garudan	Nishanth Kumar	
2024	Thundu	Baby	
2024	Thalavan	SHO/DySP Jayashankar	
2024	Nadanna Sambhavam	Unni	
2024	Manorathangal	Gopalankutty	Segment: Silalikhitham
2024	Kadha Innuvare	Ramachandran	
2026	Valathu Vashathe Kallan	CI Antony Xavier	
2026	Drishyam 3	Harikumar	Cameo Appearance
2026	Avaraachan & Sons	Avarachan	

=== Other languages ===
Year	Title	Role	Language	Notes
2005	Majaa	Rajavelu	Tamil	
2006	June R	Arun	Tamil	
2006	Thambi	Sankarapandian	Tamil	
2006	Ranam	Bhagavathi	Telugu	
2006	Khatarnak	Lawyer	Telugu	
2007	Agaram	Varma	Tamil	
2008	Pazhani	Jeevanandham	Tamil	
2008	Arasangam	Manoj/Martin Jayapal	Tamil	
2008	Alibhabha	Police Commissioner	Tamil	
2010	Porkkalam	Inspector Rangasamy	Tamil	
2017	Aadu Aata Aadu		Kannada	
2025	Madharaasi	NIA Team Head Premnath	Tamil	
2027	Dragon †	Jaleel Rahman	Telugu	Filming

=== As dubbing artist ===
- Makaramanju – Voice for Santhosh Shivan
- Vismayam (Malayalam dubbed version of Manamantha) – Voice for P. Ravi Shankar

=== Television ===
- Ningalude Swantham Chanthu (Doordarshan)
- Mikhayelinte Santhathikal (Doordarshan)
- Parudeesayilekulla Patha (Doordarshan)
- Niramala (Doordarshan)

== Awards and nominations ==
Biju Menon awards and nominations
Awards and nominations
Award	Wins	Nominations

Totals (Note: Certain award groups do not simply award one winner. They acknowledge several different recipients, have runners-up, and have third place. Since this is a specific recognition and is different from losing an award, runner-up mentions are considered wins in this award tally. For simplification and to avoid errors, each award in this list has been presumed to have had a prior nomination.)
- Wins: 26
- Nominations: 1

Award	Year	Category	Film	Result
National Film Awards	2022	Best Supporting Actor	Ayyappanum Koshiyum	Won
Kerala State Film Awards	2021	Best Actor	Aarkkariyam	Won
Kerala State Film Awards	1997	Second Best Actor	Krishnagudiyil Oru Pranayakalathu	Won
Kerala State Film Awards	2010	Second Best Actor	T. D. Dasan Std. VI B	Won
Kerala Film Critics Awards	2010	Best Supporting Actor	Marykkundoru Kunjaadu, Gadhama	Won
Kerala Film Critics Awards	2011	Second Best Actor	Various Films	Won
Kerala Film Critics Awards	2020	Best Actor	Ayyappanum Koshiyum	Won
Asianet Film Awards	1999	Best Supporting Actor	Pathram, Kannezhuthi Pottum Thottu	Won
Asianet Film Awards	2000	Best Supporting Actor	Millennium Stars	Won
Asianet Film Awards	2001	Best Star Pair Award (with Samyuktha Varma)	Meghamalhar	Won
Asianet Film Awards	2011	Best Character Actor	Snehaveedu, Seniors, Ulakam Chuttum Valiban	Won
Asianet Film Awards	2012	Best Character Actor	Ordinary, Run Baby Run	Won
Asianet Film Awards	2013	Best Actor in a Comic Role	Romans	Won
Asianet Film Awards	2014	Most Popular Actor	Vellimoonga	Won
Asianet Film Awards	2015	Best Character Actor	Anarkali	Won
Asianet Film Awards	2016	Best Character Actor	Anuraga Karikkin Vellam	Won
Filmfare Awards South	2010	Best Supporting Actor (Malayalam)	Marykkundoru Kunjaadu	Won
Filmfare Awards South	2012	Best Supporting Actor (Malayalam)	Ordinary	Won
Filmfare Awards South	2024	Best Actor (Malayalam)	Thankam	Nominated
Filmfare Awards South	2024	Best Supporting Actor (Malayalam)	Garudan	Nominated
North American Film Awards	2017	Popular Hero of the Year	Anuraga Karikkin Vellam	Won
Vanitha Film Awards	2010	Best Supporting Actor	Marykkundoru Kunjaadu	Won
Asiavision Awards	2011	Special Jury Award	Marykkundoru Kunjaadu	Won
Asiavision Awards	2013	Second Best Actor	Romans	Won
Asianet Comedy Awards	2017	Most Popular Actor	Rakshadhikari Baiju Oppu	Won
Anand TV Awards	2018	Popular Actor	Rakshadhikari Baiju Oppu	Won
Mazhavil Entertainment Awards	2022	Best Entertainer Actor	Ayyappanum Koshiyum	Won
10th South Indian International Movie Awards	2022	Best Actor in a Leading Role - Critics	Aarkkariyam	Won
10th South Indian International Movie Awards	2022	Best Actor in a Leading Role	Aarkkariyam	Nominated
