= Nalpathiyonnu (41) =

Indian Malayalam film

- Theatrical release poster
- Directed by: Lal Jose
- Written by: P. G. Prageesh
- Produced by: G. Prajith; Anumodh Bose; Aadharsh Narayanan
- Starring: Biju Menon; Sharanjith; Nimisha Sajayan; Dhanya Ananya; Suresh Krishna; Indrans; Shivaji Guruvayoor
- Cinematography: S. Kumar
- Edited by: Ranjan Abraham
- Music by: Bijibal
- Production company: Signature Studios
- Distributed by: LJ Films
- Release date: 8 November 2019
- Running time: 134 minutes
- Country: India
- Language: Malayalam

Nalpathiyonnu (41) is a 2019 Indian Malayalam-language devotional satirical drama film directed by Lal Jose and written by P. G. Prageesh. It stars Biju Menon, Sharanjith, Nimisha Sajayan, Dhanya Ananya, Indrans and Suresh Krishna in the lead roles. The film is produced by G. Prajith, Anumod Bose and Adarsh Narayan and the music was composed by Bijibal.

This socio-political satire unravels through hilarious incidents when two people - strong followers of Communist ideologies-set out on a pilgrimage to Sabarimala. This is the 25th directorial venture of ace director Lal Jose. The film was released on 8 November 2019.

The film is inspired from true events. The climax of the film talks about the 2011 Sabarimala stampede, the tragedy which shocked Kerala.

== Plot ==
This socio-political satire unravels through hilarious incidents when two people - leftist, fellow traveller, rationalist and educator Ullas Maashu and party activist Vavachi Kannan - set out on a pilgrimage to Sabarimala Temple. The story begins with showing Ullas proving people on how people can cheat them and there is no God.

== Cast ==
- Biju Menon as C. S. Ullas Kumar
- Sharanjith as Vavachi Kannan
- Nimisha Sajayan as Bhagyasooyam
- Dhanya Ananya as Suma
- Suresh Krishna as Ravi Nambiar
- Indrans as Kuttan Mesthiry, Bhagyasooyam's father
- Shivaji Guruvayoor as Sebastian Maashu
- Vijilesh Karayad as Lijo
- Srikant Murali as Narayana Swami
- Gopalakrishnan as Abubacker
- Elsy Sukumaran as Ullas' mother
- Guru Manaf as Therali Maashu
- Subheesh Sudhi as Parunthu Biju
- Kottayam Pradeep as Dr. Kochaniyan
- Sivadas Mattannur
- Sabu Thottapalli as Ambalappuzha Bus Depot Security

== Soundtrack ==
Bijibal provided the music and background music for the film.

41

Soundtrack album by Bijibal
- Recorded: 2019
- Genre: Feature Film Soundtrack
- Language: Malayalam

No.	Title	Lyrics	Singer(s)	Length
1.	"Arutharuthu"	Rafeeq Ahammed	Vijesh Gopal
2.	"Ayyanayyan"		Sharathu

== Release ==
Naalpathyonnu (41) was released in India on 8 November 2019.
