= Achanurangatha Veedu =

- Video CD cover
- Directed by: Lal Jose
- Written by: Babu Janardhanan
- Produced by: Reji Puthayath
- Starring: Salim Kumar; Muktha; Samvrutha Sunil; Indrajith Sukumaran
- Cinematography: Manoj Pillai
- Edited by: Ranjan Abraham
- Music by: Alex Paul
- Production company: Griha Mithra
- Distributed by: Shirdhisayi Films
- Release date: 28 January 2006
- Country: India
- Language: Malayalam

Achanuragantha Veedu (lit. 'House of a sleepless father') is a 2006 Indian Malayalam-language drama film directed by Lal Jose and written by Babu Janardhanan. It stars Salim Kumar, Muktha, Samvrutha Sunil, Prithviraj Sukumaran and Indrajith Sukumaran. The film was released on 28 January 2006. For his performance, Salim Kumar won the Kerala State Film Award for Second Best Actor.

== Plot ==
Samuel after his wife's death faces hardship raising his three daughters. The story takes a mysterious route when his youngest daughter disappears.

== Cast ==
- Salim Kumar as Samuel / Prabhakaran
- Muktha as Lisamma Samuel
- Samvrutha Sunil as Sherly Samuel
- Suja Karthika as Tressa Samuel
- Usha as Lillykutty
- Prithviraj Sukumaran as Harikrishnan
- Indrajith Sukumaran as Police sub-inspector
- Murali as Shekharan Nair
- Sadiq as M.L.A Kuruvila
- T.S Raju as S.P Thomas Mathew
- Madhu Warrier as Gopy
- Manikandan Pattambi as Maniyappan
- Dinesh Prabhakar as Rajeev
- Prasanth as Tommy
- Harisree Ashokan as Johnykutty
- Baby Nayanthara as Nayana John
- Manka Mahesh as Saramma
- Ambika Mohan as Harikrishnan's mother
- Bindu Ramakrishnan as School principal
- Cherthala Lalitha as Devaki
- Radhika as Harikrishnan's Wife

== Production ==
The story came to Janardhanan's mind after he watched the Suryanelli rape case proceedings. The film portrayed Pentecostal denomination quite extensively. It was shot in Peermade in Kerala.

== Reception ==
The film received positive critical reception, particularly noted for Salim Kumar's transformation from a comedian to serious roles.

== Sequel ==
A sequel titled Lisammayude Veedu was later produced in 2013. It was written and directed by Babu Janardhanan.
