= Mulla (film) =

- Directed by: Lal Jose
- Written by: M. Sindhuraj
- Produced by: Shebin Backer; Jemi Hameed; Sagar Shereef; Sundararajan
- Starring: Dileep; Meera Nandan; Biju Menon; Saiju Kurup
- Cinematography: Vipin Mohan
- Edited by: Ranjan Abraham
- Music by: Vidyasagar
- Release date: 27 March 2008
- Running time: 138 minutes
- Country: India
- Language: Malayalam

Mulla (transl. Jasmine) is a 2008 Indian Malayalam-language drama film directed by Lal Jose, starring Dileep, Meera Nandan, Biju Menon, and Saiju Kurup.

== Plot ==
Lachi is a hard-working 19-year-old girl who supports her family after her father's mysterious death. While she was traveling on a train, Mulla, a gangster and his men from a local colony named Karakkattu Colony enter. They argue over silly issues, and he discovers a baby in a bag on the train. They try to find the baby's parents but fail. Mulla decides to adopt the child and eventually, Mulla and Lachi fall in love.

Lachi's uncle, CI Bharathan, who murdered Lachi's father and the baby's parents, wants to break up the two to keep his secrets. He kills Mulla's friend, Ambi, who helped Bharathan kill Lachi's father to ensure that Lachi does not learn who killed his father. Finally, Mulla and Bharathan get into a fight, where Mulla kills Bharathan and avenges Ambi's death. However, Lachi tells the police that she committed the murder and goes to prison. After five years, when she returns, she finds that Mulla has lost a leg in a fight between the colony residents and the police. The colony residents had started a new business, and they all are having a good life now. The only thing they lacked was Lachi's presence. Lachi and Mulla finally unite.

== Cast ==
- Dileep as Mulla
- Meera Nandan as Lachi
- Saiju Kurup as CI Bharathan (Main Antagonist)
- Biju Menon as Ambi
- Suraj Venjaramood as Bijumon
- Shruthy Menon as Vasanthi
- Bhavana as a lunatic woman (cameo appearance)
- Salim Kumar as 'Thotti' Sasi
- Guinness Pakru as Chandran
- Chali Pala
- Rizabawa as Venu
- Sukumari as Akka
- Shivaji Guruvayoor as Bhadran
- Joju George as Babu
- Vanitha Krishnachandran as Lachi's mother
- Sudheer Karamana
- Mala Aravindan
- Reena Basheer as Malathi
- Anoop Chandran as Idiyappam
- Bala Singh
- Ashok in a special appearance in the song "Katteda"
- Suja Varunee in a special appearance in the song "Katteda"
- Japan Kumar in a special appearance in the song "Katteda"

== Production ==
The film was shot on a rented train for 16 days.

== Soundtrack ==
Mulla

Soundtrack album by Vidyasagar
- Released: 10 March 2008
- Recorded: Varsha Vallaki Studios
- Genre: Feature Film Soundtrack
- Length: 29:20
- Language: Malayalam
- Label: Satyam Audios
- Producer: Vidyasagar

Vidyasagar chronology
Sundarakanda (2008)	Mulla (2008)	Arai En 305-il Kadavul (2008)

All music is composed by Vidyasagar.

No.	Title	Artist(s)	Length
1.	"Kanalukal"	Shreekumar Vakkiyil, Sujatha Mohan
2.	"Ee Ravil"	Rahul Nambiar, Reshmi
3.	"Kannin Vaathil" (Female)	Gayatri Asokan
4.	"Katteda"	Tippu, Manikka Vinayagam, Gemon, Rimi Tomy, Reshmi
5.	"Theme Song"	Instrumental
6.	"Kannin Vaathil" (Male)	Devanand
7.	"Aarumukhan"	Rimi Tomy

== Reception ==
G. Jayakumar of The Hindu wrote that "The film, directed by Lal Jose, has an interesting storyline, about a thug who becomes a law-abiding citizen. But the transformation is not expressed convincingly enough". A critic from Rediff.com wrote that "Mulla may be one of the worst films of Lal Jose in his decade old career. Yes, this from the man who gave us Meesa Madhavan, Classmates, Achanurangatha Veedu and Arabikkadha". A critic from Sify wrote that "On the whole the Lal Jose- Dileep team has delivered a dud with Mulla as it has far too many gaping plot holes, no story to say, and drags big time".
