= Millennium Stars =

- Directed by: Jayaraj
- Screenplay by: Vinod Ranganath
- Story by: Jayaraj
- Produced by: N. Krishnakumar (Kireedam Unni)
- Starring: Suresh Gopi; Jayaram; Biju Menon; Abhirami
- Music by: Vidyasagar
- Release date: 1 January 2000
- Country: India
- Language: Malayalam

Millennium Stars is a 2000 Indian Malayalam-language drama film directed by Jayaraj. It stars Suresh Gopi, Jayaram, Biju Menon and Abhirami in the lead roles. The soundtrack of the film was composed by Vidyasagar. It became the first Malayalam movie to be released in the new millennium. Biju Menon won the Asianet Film Award for Best Supporting Actor for this film. Later dubbed into Tamil and released as Sivasankar.

== Plot ==
When they were children, Shiva and Shankar went to Mumbai in search of a living. Circumstances put them in jail, where they meet a bully named Karunan. They escape from jail. Several years later, Shankar and Shiva dream of becoming singers. Karunan is still active as a criminal. Through their hard work, the Shiva-Shankar duo become successful singers and start being called "Millennium Stars". Then the villain enters and tries to separate the two. Karunan convinces them not to separate.

== Cast ==
- Suresh Gopi as Karunan
- Jayaram as Shankar
- Biju Menon as Shivan
- Abhirami as Radha
- Suja Raghuram
- Harisree Asokan
- Devan
- Shishir Sharma
- Kalabhavan Mani
- Manorama as roadside stall owner
- Laxmi Rattan
- Jagathy Sreekumar
- Senthil

== Soundtrack ==
Millennium Stars

Soundtrack album by Vidyasagar
- Released: December 1999
- Studios: Varsha Vallaki, Chennai
- Genre: Film soundtrack
- Labels: Johny Sagariga; T-Series

The film's music was composed by Vidyasagar, with Malayalam lyrics by Gireesh Puthenchery, Hindi lyrics by Tahir Faraz and English lyrics by Recardo Barrantes. Though the film failed at the box-office, the soundtrack is considered as one of Vidyasagar's career bests.

Track	Title	Singer(s)	Lyricists	Raga(s)
1	"O... Mumbai"	K. J. Yesudas, Vijay Yesudas	Gireesh Puthenchery, Tahir Faraz	
2	"Parayaan Njan Marannu"	K. J. Yesudas, Hariharan, Vijay Yesudas, Sujatha Mohan (humming)	Gireesh Puthenchery, Tahir Faraz	
3	"Krishna Krishna"	K. J. Yesudas, Vijay Yesudas	Poonthanam Nambudiri	
4	"Kuku Kuku Theevandi"	Harikrishnan, Anand Kumar	Gireesh Puthenchery	Kalyani
5	"Maha Ganapathim"	K. J. Yesudas, Hariharan, Srinivas, Harish Raghavendra, Vijay Yesudas, Pushpa Raman, Chorus	Muthuswami Dikshitar, Tahir Faraz, Recardo Barrantes	Nata
6	"Shravan Gange"	K. J. Yesudas, Hariharan, Vijay Yesudas, Chorus	Gireesh Puthenchery, Tahir Faraz	Charukesi, Bahudari

== Box office ==
This film was released with huge expectations but was a box office failure as the producer lost ₹1.5 crore (US$160,000).
