= Lal Jose =

Indian Malayalam filmmaker

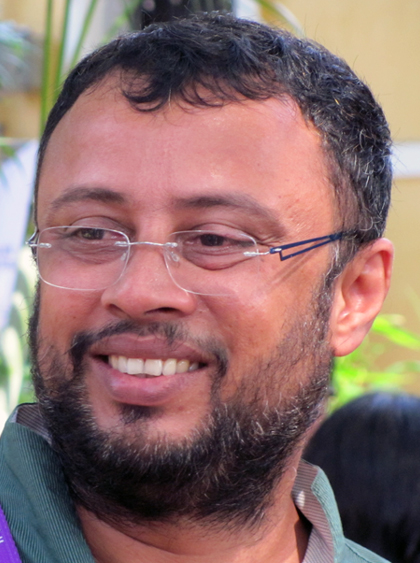
- Jose in 2010
- Born: Valapad, Thrissur, Kerala, India
- Occupations: Film director; Actor; Producer; Distributor
- Years active: 1989–present
- Spouse: Leena
- Children: 2

Lal Jose is an Indian film director, actor, producer, and distributor who works in Malayalam cinema. He began his career as an assistant director, and made his directorial debut with the 1998 film Oru Maravathoor Kanavu.

Lal Jose started his film career as an assistant director to Kamal. Lal worked on a slew of Kamal's films during the 1990s. His popular films include Chandranudikkunna Dikhil (1999), Meesa Madhavan (2002), Chanthupottu (2005), Classmates (2006), Arabikkatha (2007), Neelathaamara (2009), Diamond Necklace (2012), Ayalum Njanum Thammil (2012), Immanuel (2013), and Vikramadithyan (2014).

== Early life ==
Born in Valapad in Thrissur district, Kerala to Lilly and Jose of the Mechery house. Lal did his schooling at NSS KPT School and NSS College, Ottapalam. He is married to Leena. The couple have two daughters, Irene and Catherine. After completing his degree, he left for Chennai, with an aim of getting into movies. He got into the world of cinema by assisting noted director Kamal. He worked with Kamal in 16 films, from Pradheshika Varthakkal to Krishnagudiyil Oru Pranayakalathu. He worked as the associate director to prominent filmmakers like Thampy Kannamthanam, Lohithadas, Harikumar, Vinayan, K. K. Haridas, and Nizar.

== Film career ==
In 1998, he made his debut as an independent director with Oru Maravathoor Kanavu, which starred Mammootty and was scripted by Sreenivasan. Producer Siyad Koker asked Lal Jose to direct a film for him. The film Oru Maravathoor Kanavu was a success for him.

In 2002 Lal Jose, teaming up with screenwriter Ranjan Pramod, who had earlier scripted Randaam Bhavam, came up with Meesa Madhavan, which was a milestone in his career along with that of Dileep. Meesa Madhavan was a hit and established Dileep in the industry. But Lal proved his critics wrong in the year 2005 with Chanthupottu, starring Dileep. The box-office success of Chanthupottu took Lal Jose's career to new heights. In 2006, Lal directed Achanurangatha Veedu, a low-budget film, which failed to bring audiences to the movie halls, though it won critical appreciation.

In 2006, Lal Jose's film Classmates was released without much publicity, with no big stars, but became the highest-grossing film in Malayalam, until its record was broken by Twenty:20 two years later. In 2007, he did Arabikkatha, with Sreenivasan in a leading role. Arabikkatha was critically and commercially a big hit. His next movie was Mulla, starring Dileep. In 2009, Lal directed Neelathamara, written by M. T. Vasudevan Nair, which was a remake of the 30-year-old movie with the same name. It was accepted well by the critics and the masses. He directed a story with Mammootty as lead in Kerala Cafe in 2010. He then directed the hit film Elsamma Enna Aankutty without multistars. In 2011, he became a judge on a reality show on Surya TV called Vivel Active Fair Big Break, where the winner would be the heroine in his next movie.

== Awards ==
Kerala state film awards

- 2006: Best Popular Film – Classmates
- 2005: Kerala state film awards for Second Best Film – Achanurangatha Veedu
- 2012: Best Director- Ayalum Njanum Thammil
- 2012: Best Popular Film- Ayalum Njanum Thammil

South Indian International Movie Awards

- 2013: Best Director for Ayalum Njanum Thammil
- 2013: Nominated—Best Film for Diamond Necklace

Asianet Film Awards

- 2007: Best Director Award for Arabikkatha

Ramu Karyat Awards

- 2010: Best Director Award for Elsamma Enna Aankutty

Asiavision Awards

- 2013 – Asiavision Awards – Artistic Movie – Ayalum Njanum Thammil

== Filmography ==
Key
†	Denotes films that have not yet been released

- All films are in Malayalam language unless otherwise noted.

=== As director ===
Year	Film	Writer	Notes
1998	Oru Maravathoor Kanavu	Sreenivasan	
1999	Chandranudikkunna Dikkil	Babu Janardhanan	
2001	Randaam Bhavam	Ranjan Pramod	
2002	Meesa Madhavan	Ranjan Pramod	
2003	Pattalam	Reji Nair	
2004	Rasikan	Murali Gopy	
2005	Chanthupottu	Benny P. Nayarambalam	
2006	Achanurangatha Veedu	Babu Janardhanan	
2006	Classmates	James Albert	
2007	Arabikkatha	Iqbal Kuttippuram	
2008	Mulla	M. Sindhuraj	
2009	Neelathaamara	M. T. Vasudevan Nair	
2009	Kerala Cafe	Yes	Segment: Puramkazchakal
2010	Elsamma Enna Aankutty	M. Sindhuraj	
2012	Spanish Masala	Benny P. Nayarambalam	
2012	Diamond Necklace	Iqbal Kuttippuram	
2012	Ayalum Njanum Thammil	Bobby–Sanjay	
2013	Immanuel	A.C. Vijeesh	
2013	Pullipulikalum Aattinkuttiyum	M. Sindhuraj	
2013	Ezhu Sundara Rathrikal	James Albert	
2014	Vikramadithyan	Iqbal Kuttippuram	
2015	Nee-Na	R. Venugopal	
2017	Velipadinte Pusthakam	Benny P. Nayarambalam	
2018	Thattumpurath Achuthan	M. Sindhuraj	
2019	Nalpathiyonnu (41)	P. G. Prageesh	25th film
2021	Meow	Iqbal Kuttippuram	
2022	Solomonte Theneechakal	P. G. Prageesh	

=== As second unit or assistant director ===
- Meenathil Thalikettu (1998) (story and associate director)
- Krishnagudiyil Oru Pranayakalathu (1997) (assistant director)
- Bhoothakannadi (1997) (associate director)
- Manasam (1997) (assistant director)
- Azhakiya Ravanan (1996) (assistant director)
- Udyana Palakan (1996) (associate director)
- Mazhayethum Munpe (1995) (assistant director)
- Maanthrikam (1995) (associate director)
- Sudinam (1994) (associate director)
- Vadhu Doctoranu (1994) (associate director)
- Bhoomi Geetham (1993) (assistant director)
- Champakulam Thachan (1992) (assistant director)
- Ennodishtam Koodamo (1992) (assistant director)
- Pookkalam Varavayi (1991) (assistant director)
- Ulladakkam (1991) (assistant director)
- Pradeshika Varthakal (1989) (assistant director)

=== Story ===
- Meenathil Thalikettu (1998)
- Chandranudikkunna Dikkil (1999)

=== As producer ===
- Diamond Necklace (2012)
- Vikramadhithyan (2014)
- Nee-Na (2015)
- Solomonte Theneechakal (2022)

=== As distributor ===
- Thattathin Marayathu (2012)
- Theevram (2012)
- Diamond Necklace (2012)
- Neram (2013)
- Pullipulikalum Aattinkuttiyum (2013)
- Thira (2013)
- Ezhu Sundara Rathrikal (2013)
- 1983 (2014)
- Homely meals (2014)
- Vikramadithyan (2014)
- KL.10 Pathu (2015)
- Action Hero Biju (2016)
- Jacobinte Swargarajyam (2016)
- Style (2016)
- Lens (2016)
- Aanandam (2016)
- Veeram (2017)

=== As actor ===
Year	Title	Role	Notes
1993	Bhoomi Geetham	Journalist	
1995	Sargavasantham		
1996	Azhakiya Ravanan	Assistant Director	
2007	Rock & Roll	Himself	
2010	Best Actor	Himself	
2010	Nadan	Himself	
2014	Ohm Shanthi Oshaana	Jacob Tharakan	
2016	Oru Muthassi Gadha	Himself	
2017	Sunday Holiday	David Paul	
2018	Kammara Sambhavam	Himself	
2018	Ente Mezhuthiri Athazhangal	Augustine Theodorus	
2018	Ennaalum Sarath..?	Peter	
2019	Oru Nakshathramulla Aakasham	John Paul	
2019	Mohabbathin Kunjabdulla		
2020	Varane Avashyamund	Sivaprasad	
2020	Gypsy	Muthaleef	
2021	Kuttiyappanum Daivadootharum	Himself	
2021	Kshanam	Himself	Cameo
2022	Nipah		
2022	Haya	Dr. Sai Nath	
2023	Imbam	Devan	
2024	Oru Sarkar Ulpannam	Dasettan	
2024	Mandakini	Sudevan	
2026	Pradhama Drishtiya Kuttakkar	Doctor	

=== As Narrator ===
- Vellimoonga (2014)
- Chirakodinja Kinavukal (2015)

=== Television ===
- 2012 :Vivel Big Break (Surya TV) as Judge
- 2018 : Makkal (TV series) (Mazhavil Manorama) as himself
- 2019: Comedy Stars season 2 (asianet) as Judge
- 2022: Wife is Beautiful ( Zee Keralam) as promo voice over
- 2023:Charithram Enniloode ( Safari TV) as host

== Recurring collaborators ==
Music composer VidyaSagar has worked on 12 films out of Lal Jose's total 22 feature-length films. Sukumari had acted on 12 films, whereas Salim Kumar in 11 and Biju Menon in 9 and Dileep, Indrajith, Jagathy Sreekumar and Suraj Venjaramoodu appeared on 7 films. Dubbing artiste Sreeja Ravi works as heroine voice for many films.

Films	Dileep	Biju Menon	Indrajith	Samvrutha Sunil	Jagathy Sreekumar	Nedumudi Venu	Sukumari	Sreenivasan	Salim Kumar	Kunchako Boban	Vidyasagar	Suraj Venjaramoodu	Joju George	Sreeja Ravi
Oru Maravathoor Kanavu (1998)		check				check	check	check			check			check
Chandranudikkunna Dikhil (1999)	check	check					check				check			check
Randaam Bhavam (2001)		check				check	check				check			
Meesa Madhavan (2002)	check		check		check		check		check		check			check
Pattalam (2003)		check	check		check		check		check		check		check	check
Rasikan (2004)	check	check		check	check		check		check		check	check		check
Chanthupottu (2005)	check	check	check				check		check		check		check	check
Achanurangatha Veedu (2006)			check	check	check				check					
Classmates (2006)			check		check		check					check		check
Arabikkatha (2007)			check	check	check	check		check	check			check		
Mulla (2008)	check	check					check		check		check	check	check	check
Kerala Cafe (Puram Kazchakal) (2009)								check						
Neelathaamara (2009)				check							check			
Elsamma Enna Aankutty (2010)			check		check	check				check		check		
Spanish Masala (2012)	check	check								check	check			
Diamond Necklace (2012)				check			check	check			check			
Ayalum Njanum Thammil (2012)				check			check		check					
Immanuel (2013)						check	check		check					
Pullipulikalum Aattinkuttiyum(2013)										check	check	check	check	
Ezhu Sundara Rathrikal(2013)	check							check				check		
Vikramadithyan(2014)														
Nee-Na(2015)														
Velipadinte Pustakam(2017)									check					
Thattumpurath Achuthan (2018)						check				check				
Nalpathiyonnu (41) (2019)		check												
Meow (2021)									check					
Solamante Theneechakal (2022)											check		check	

== See also ==
- List of films directed by Lal Jose featuring Vidyasagar
