= Solomonte Theneechakal =

2022 Malayalam film

- Theatrical release poster
- Directed by: Lal Jose
- Written by: P. G. Prageesh
- Screenplay by: P. G. Prageesh
- Produced by: Lal Jose
- Starring: Joju George; Darshana S Nair; Vincy Aloshious; Shambhu Menon; Addis Antony Akkara
- Cinematography: Ajmal Sabu
- Edited by: Ranjan Abraham
- Music by: Vidyasagar
- Production company: LJ Films
- Distributed by: LJ Films
- Release date: 18 August 2022
- Country: India
- Language: Malayalam

Solomonte Theneechakal (transl. Solomon's Honeybees) is a 2022 Indian Malayalam-language romantic thriller film directed by Lal Jose and written by P. G. Prageesh. Produced by Lal Jose through the production house LJ Films, the film stars Joju George, Darshana S. Nair and Vincy Aloshious along with debutants Shambhu Menon and Addis Antony Akkara. Vidyasagar composed the film's music, and the cinematography was handled by Ajmal Sabu.

== Plot ==
Women police constables Suja and Glyna are two best friends who are always cheerful. However, their bond of friendship is tested when Suja's lover is guilty of a committing a crime.

== Cast ==
- Joju George as Investigating Officer CI D. Solomon
- Darshana S. Nair as CPO Suja S., Traffic Police
- Vincy Aloshious as CPO Glyna Thomas
- Shambhu Menon as Sharath Balakrishnan
- Addis Antony Akkara as CI Binu Alex
- Johny Antony as SI Abu Hamsa
- Shaju Sreedhar as Senior CPO Kunju Muhammed
- Binu Pappu as Public Prosecutor Stephen Philip
- Shiva Parvathy as Valarmathi (voice dubbed by Savitha Reddy)
- Manikandan Achari as Arumughan
- Sunil Sukhada as Nikhil Davis
- Shivaji Guruvayoor as City Police Commissioner
- Abhinav Manikantan as Sandeep
- V. K. Baiju as ACP
- Aurora Adya

== Production ==
=== Casting ===
The first audition of the film was held in 2018 and 16 actors were shortlisted including eight male and eight females from nearly 10,000 applications. In May 2018, it was announced by director Lal Jose that the lead actors for his upcoming film will be selected through a talent hunt show Nayika Nayakan aired on Mazhavil Manorama which will have 16 contestants competing in 4 rounds. On the finale, Shambhu Menon and Darshana S. Nair were declared the winners of the show by Jose and the lead pair for his upcoming film. The runners-up of the show Vincy Aloshious and Addis Antony Akkara were selected to play pivotal roles in the film. Jose commended that the reason he chose Shambhu and Darshana was purely professional. He added that "he wanted them for the particular roles in that movie. Their body language, accent, gestures, past life etc. were apt for his character." Lead actor, Shambhu transformed his physique to suit the character and also started practising martial arts and parkour for his upcoming role. On 17 November 2021, Joju George was revealed to be a part of the film. Scriptwriter P. G. Prageesh disclosed that Vincy and Darshana would be playing two women civil police officers who lead an ordinary life in the outskirts of Kochi. Addis will be playing the character of a circle inspector with Shambhu cast as a youngster who lives alone in Kochi, doing random jobs. Johny Antony was also announced as a part of the cast in March 2022.

=== Filming ===
The film was expected to start rolling in May 2019 but was delayed due to the COVID-19 pandemic. Principal photography began on 17 November 2021 with a customary pooja function held in Kochi. The film was expected to wrap up in a single schedule by mid-January 2022. The film had Njarakkal Police Station, Eloor, Kumbalangi and other different parts of Kochi as the film's locations.

=== Post-production ===
The title of the film was announced as Solamante Theneechakal through a title-poster released on 5 March 2022 through the official social media accounts of director Lal Jose. The filming was also revealed to be over on an unspecified date. The character posters from the film were launched from June 2022. Actress Vincy Aloshious completed dubbing for her character in June 2022. Actor Kalesh Ramanand of Hridayam fame has dubbed for several characters. Official character teaser of Joju George's Solaman was released by Dulquer Salmaan on 17 July 2022. The director's trailer was released on 30 July 2022 by Mammootty.

== Soundtrack ==
Solamante Theneechakal

Soundtrack album by Vidyasagar
- Released: 2022
- Recorded: 2021–2022
- Genre: Feature film soundtrack
- Length: 17:41 minutes
- Language: Malayalam
- Label: Manorama Music

Vidyasagar chronology
My Santa (2019)	Solamante Theneechakal (2022)	Double Tuckerr (2024)

Composer Vidyasagar provided the music for the film. The soundtrack album was distributed by the label of Manorama Music. The film's soundtrack audio was launched at the grand finale of reality show Super 4 Juniors, aired in Mazhavil Manorama. The lyrical video of the first song of the film "Aanandamo", written by Vinayak Sasikumar was released on 20 April 2022. The lyrical video of the second song "Viral Thodathe" was released on 9 July 2022. The video song of the third song, "Pancharakko", penned by Vayalar Sarath Chandra Varma was released on 7 August 2022.

=== Track listing ===
Original songs
No.	Title	Lyrics	Singer(s)	Length
1.	"Aanandamo"	Vinayak Sasikumar	Abhay Jodhpurkar, Anwesshaa	5:21
2.	"Viral Thodathe"	Vinayak Sasikumar	Nakul Abhyankar	4:39
3.	"Pancharakko"	Vayalar Sarath Chandra Varma	Athira Sujith, Reena Murali	4:20
4.	"Vaanam Para Para"	Vinayak Sasikumar	Anand Sreeraj	3:21
Total length:				17:41

== Release ==
The film was released theatrically on 18 August 2022. The streaming rights was bagged by ManoramaMax.

== Reception ==
=== Critical response ===
S. R. Praveen from The Hindu called it "better than Lal Jose’s recent works, but not near his best". He further wrote "Though there are some effective twists and turns written into the script, the investigation part might pale in comparison to some of the more slick crime thrillers being made these days due to the way it has been translated on the screen". He thought that some of the young crop of actors, including lead actors Vincy Aloshious, Darshana, Shambhu and Addis, showed promise.

Princy Alexander of Onmanorama wrote: "Solomonte Theneechakal is clearly not a film that banks solely on content to sell. Rather it is a movie which aims at celebrating its young crop of promising actors, handpicked by the director himself". She further thought "it would have been more satisfying had the director chosen to stick to only one genre, without attempting to mix two subjects.

Lakshmi Priya for The News Minute wrote: "Solomonte Theneechakal is by no means a ‘grand return’ for Lal Jose, but it is still a gripping crime thriller that effectively pulls off several twists and turns".
