= Meow (2021 film) =

- Theatrical release poster
- Directed by: Lal Jose
- Written by: Iqbal Kuttippuram
- Starring: Soubin Shahir; Mamta Mohandas
- Cinematography: Ajmal Sabu
- Edited by: Ranjan Abraham
- Music by: Justin Varghese
- Production company: Thomas Thiruvalla Films
- Release date: 24 December 2021
- Country: India
- Language: Malayalam

Meow is a 2021 Indian Malayalam-language family drama film directed by Lal Jose and written by Iqbal Kuttippuram. It stars Soubin Shahir and Mamta Mohandas. The film is about a non-resident Indian businessman named Dasthakir who lives in the United Arab Emirates. He is from Aluva and hates cats. The film was shot in Ras Al Khaimah, United Arab Emirates.

== Cast ==
- Soubin Shahir as Dasthakir "Dasthu"/ "Dostoevsky"
- Mamta Mohandas as Sulaikha (Sulu)
- Salim Kumar as Ustad
- Harisree Yousuf as Chandran
- Cat as Diana

== Soundtrack ==
Music by Justin Varghese.

- ‘Hijabi’ - Adheef Muhamed (lyrics by Suhail Koya)

== Reception ==
A critic from Sify wrote that "Meow is narrated in a conventional way and if you are fine about that style, this one could be a fine watch".

The Times of India wrote that "Both the script and the direction needed to be tighter to keep the audience interested, particularly when viewers are spoilt for choice on OTT platforms".

A critic from The News Minute wrote that Meow is just a random sequence of events in somebody's life that you get to watch, but you don't really get the point of it".

A critic from The Hindu wrote that "Meow is one of those films that does not hit any highs or lows, and proceeds along at a largely uneventful, even pace".

Contrary to the negative reviews, a critic from Manorama Online praised the film and said that "In short, Meow is the perfect family entertainer for this Christmas".
