= Samastha Keralam PO =

- Directed by: Bipin Prabhakar
- Written by: K. Gireesh Kumar
- Produced by: Howly Pottoor
- Starring: Jayaram; Serah; Jagathy Sreekumar
- Cinematography: Rajarathinam
- Edited by: Ranjan Abraham
- Music by: M. Jayachandran
- Release date: 31 March 2009
- Running time: 130 minutes
- Country: India
- Language: Malayalam

Samastha Keralam PO is a 2009 Indian Malayalam political drama film by Bipin Prabhakar starring Jayaram, Priyanka Nair and Jagathy Sreekumar.

== Plot ==
Member Prabakaran is a Gandhian and Panchayat Member in Thonnurkara village who always thinks about the welfare of the people. He is willing to fight against the ruling party as well as with the opposition when he sees injustice being done. Such a selfless politician naturally earns more enemies than friends and his enemies join hands against him.

== Cast ==
- Jayaram as P. K. Prabhakaran Nair
- Jagathy Sreekumar as Avarachan
- Jagadish as Chandy
- Suraj Venjaramood as Oshanam Abdullah
- Salim Kumar as Subramanian
- Serah as Renjini Ramakrishnan
- Priyanka as Radha
- Balachandran Chullikad as Balagangadharan
- Janardhanan as Valiya Ammavan
- Innocent
- Kunchan as Sitharthan
- Premkumar as "Mao" Mohanan
- Meena Ganesh as Narayani
- P. Sreekumar as Ramakrishnan Nair
- Chitra Shenoy as Saraswathy Amma
- Shivaji Guruvayoor as Dasan
- Irshad as Bharathan
- Vincent Asokan as Christy Thomas / Michael
- Sadiq as Subair
- Kochu Preman as the oracle
- Shaju as Suresh
- Kalabhavan Prajod as Raghu

== Soundtrack ==
Lyrics were written by Vayalar Sarath Chandra Varma.

- "Kulirengum Thooviyethum" - Vineeth Sreenivasan
- "Poonthen Nilave" - Rimi Tomy
- "Maandhara Manavaatti" - Manjari
- "Sundari Sundari" - Vijay Yesudas
- "Pandente Arikathu" - Jithendra Varma
- Maarikaavadi - Pradeep Pallaruthy, Palakkadu KL Sreeram,
- Andy Day, Luke Toulson, Donald Cameron, Jacob Scipio,

== Box office ==
The film was a commercial failure at box office.
