= Azhakiya Ravanan =

1996 Indian Malayalam drama film

- Poster
- Directed by: Kamal
- Screenplay by: Sreenivasan
- Story by: Sreenivasan
- Produced by: V. P. Madhavan Nair
- Starring: Mammootty; Bhanupriya; Sreenivasan; Innocent; Biju Menon; Rajan P. Dev; Cochin Haneefa
- Cinematography: P. Sukumar
- Edited by: K. Rajagopal
- Music by: Vidyasagar
- Distributed by: Murali Films
- Release date: 9 February 1996
- Running time: 162 minutes
- Country: India
- Language: Malayalam

Azhakiya Ravanan (Handsome Ravanan) is a 1996 Indian Malayalam-language romantic comedy-drama film directed by Kamal and written by Sreenivasan. The film has an ensemble cast of Mammootty, Bhanupriya, Sreenivasan, Innocent, Biju Menon, Rajan P. Dev, and Cochin Haneefa. The movie was produced by V. P. Madhavan Nair under the banner of Murali Films, while the music was composed by Vidyasagar as his debut in Malayalam. The 2015 film Chirakodinja Kinavukal is a spin-off to this film.

== Plot ==
Shankar Das (Mammootty) is a rich man who returns to his native village in Alappuzha. No one in the village is aware of his past. During his childhood, he was a servant of the local feudal lord, Chatothu Panickar (Rajan P. Dev). He left the job after getting severely punished for kissing the lord's young daughter Anuradha (Bhanupriya). He fled to Mumbai and becomes a successful entrepreneur.

Now, he has returned to the village incognito. He is a very boastful man and revels in the praises showered on him by his sycophants. He reveals his identity to Ambujakshan (Sreenivasan), his childhood friend and currently who is a tailor and an unsuccessful novelist. He also confides in him his interest in Panicker's daughter, Anuradha, who was his childhood infatuation. Ambujakshan succeeds in convincing Shankar to produce a film by telling him that it would help him earn the respect of the villagers and win over Anuradha. Thus, the production of the film starts under the direction of Sharath who is also the love interest of Anuradha.

Shankar renders unsolicited financial help to Panicker's family. He later realizes the affection between Anuradha and Sharath(Biju Menon), leading to a pause in the film's production. Later, Shankar proposes marriage to Anuradha which she declines. However, the family, indebted to him, coerces her to marry him. Anuradha, who is infuriated, decides that she will not present herself as a virgin before Shankar and makes love with Sharath. After the marriage, she learns from Shankar that Sharath has accepted money from him for not creating any trouble for their marriage. This causes another heartbreak for her and she confesses about her relationship with Sharath to Shankar. In the end, Shankar embraces Anuradha, and their marital relationship resumes.

== Cast ==
- Mammootty as Shankar Das / Kuttishankaran
- Sreenivasan as Ambujakshan
- Bhanupriya as Anuradha
  - Kavya Madhavan as Young Anuradha
- Biju Menon as Sarath
- Cochin Haneefa as Varghese, Shankar Das's Assistant
- Innocent as Karayogam President T.P.V Kuruppu
- Rajan P. Dev as Chathothu Panicker
- Valsala Menon as Omanakuttyamma
- Santhakumari as Sarath's mother
- Anju Aravind as Sandhya
- Vineeth Kumar as Santhosh, Anuradha's Brother
- Kunchan as Music Director Siddiq
- Lal Jose as Assistant Director
- Jagadish as himself
- Madhupal as himself
- Spadikam George as himself
- Zainuddin as himself
- Krishna Kumar
- Beena Antony as herself
- Vinodhini
- Vichithra

== Soundtrack ==
Azhakiya Ravanan

Soundtrack album by Vidyasagar
- Released: January 1996
- Genre: Feature film soundtrack
- Length: 23:35
- Label: Satyam Audios
- Producer: Vidyasagar

Vidyasagar chronology
Mummy Mee Aayanochadu (1995)	Azhakiya Ravanan (1996)	Indraprastham (1996)

This movie marked Vidyasagar's entry into Malayalam films. He won Kerala State Film Award for Best Music Director for his songs.

All lyrics are written by Kaithapram Damodaran Namboothiri; all music is composed by Vidyasagar.

No.	Title	Singer(s)	Length
1.	"Vennila Chandana"	K. J. Yesudas, Shabnam	5:14
2.	"Pranayamanithooval"	Sujatha Mohan	4:31
3.	"Sumangalee"	K. J. Yesudas	4:46
4.	"Pranayamanithooval"	K. J. Yesudas	4:30
5.	"O Dilruba"	K. S. Chithra, Hariharan	5:14
6.	"Vennila Chandana"	K. S. Chithra	5:14
Total length:			25:35

== Awards ==
Kerala State Film Awards

- Best Lyricist - Kaithapram Damodaran Namboothiri
- Best Music Director - Vidyasagar
- Best Female Singer - Sujatha Mohan

Kerala Film Critics Association Awards

- Best Female Playback Singer - Sujatha Mohan
