= Diamond Necklace (film) =

2012 film by Lal Jose

- Theatrical release poster
- Directed by: Lal Jose
- Written by: Iqbal Kuttippuram
- Produced by: PV Pradeep; Lal Jose
- Starring: Fahadh Faasil; Samvrutha Sunil; Anusree; Gauthami Nair
- Cinematography: Sameer Thahir
- Edited by: Ranjan Abraham
- Music by: Vidyasagar
- Production companies: Anitha Productions; LJ Films
- Distributed by: LJ Films
- Release date: 4 May 2012
- Running time: 157 minutes
- Country: India
- Language: Malayalam
- Budget: ₹3.5 crore
- Box office: ₹ 12.57 crore

Diamond Necklace is a 2012 Indian Malayalam-language romantic comedy-drama film directed and co-produced by Lal Jose. It stars Fahadh Faasil, Samvrutha Sunil, Anusree, and Gauthami Nair. The film tells the story of Dubai-based oncologist, Dr. Arun Kumar, and the end of his luxurious life after meeting three women from different lifestyles.

Diamond Necklace was released on 4 May 2012. It received positive reviews from critics and was a commercial success at the box-office. The film won two Filmfare Awards South — Best Supporting Actress (Gauthami Nair) and Best Music Director (Vidyasagar).

== Plot ==
Dr. Arun Kumar is a young oncologist based in Dubai. He lives off of credit cards, drives luxurious cars, and enjoys life to the hilt without worrying about the future. The risk of credit card debt is revealed when his car is towed by his creditors.

The film also focuses on his relationship with the people around him. Dr. Savithri Akka, his boss in the hospital, spoils him with sisterly affection. Lakshmi, a newly recruited Tamil nurse in his department, is the first girl Arun is seriously smitten by. Lakshmi has come to Dubai to fulfill her mother's dream of building a hospital in their village, as her father died due to lack of proper treatment. Arun and Lakshmi secretly start dating and end up consummating their relationship.

Meanwhile, Maya, a relative of Savithri, a fashion designer formerly based in the UK and France and now settled in Dubai, wants to start her own boutique in Dubai. Maya is engaged to Deepak, who is in France. Maya is diagnosed with cancer and treated by Savithri. Deepak leaves her due to her illness, leaving Maya depressed. While moving Maya's belongings to the ward, Arun notices a diamond necklace worth ₹7 million.

One day, Venu, a laborer from his town in Kerala, informs Arun that his mother is not well. Arun cannot leave the country due to his creditors. He gets to meet Narayana Menon, who also happens to be from the same town. Through Narayanan's influence, Arun is granted permission to leave the country. When he arrives in India, he is tricked into marrying Narayanan's niece, Rajasree. Rajasree is a typical village girl who has no clue about city life.

When he returns, he learns that his friend's family has returned and he can no longer stay with him. He searches for a space but finds that he lacks the funds to pay the advance for rented accommodation. He moves to the labor camp where Venu is staying. Lakshmi learns that Arun is married and puts an end to their relationship. He ends up staying with Maya, who is searching for a person to share her spacious flat. Arun and Maya develop a liking for each other. Maya is unaware of the fact that Arun is married. Savithri forces Arun to vacate Maya's flat and bring Rajasree to Dubai. Arun vacates Maya's flat, brings his wife to Dubai, and the couple starts staying together.

Maya and Arun see each other on Maya's last day in her flat and have sex as she is unaware of Arun's marriage to Rajasree. A few days later, Maya happens to see Arun and Rajasree together in a mall. This leaves Maya mentally shocked and her illness aggravates. Injecting morphine, a pain reliever is the only option. Upon Maya's request to relieve her pain, Arun injects an excess dose of morphine. To pay off his debt, Arun steals Maya's diamond necklace and replaces it with a fake one, with the intention of returning it when a loan he has applied for is approved. Meanwhile, Maya admits that she is sorry to have entered into Arun's life and falls asleep. Rajasree, on finding the diamond necklace, thinks it is her birthday gift from her husband Arun.

When Venu learns about Arun's debt, he speaks to the bank manager, pays the first installment, and arranges for Arun to pay back the bank in installments. Maya develops complications from the overdose and narrowly escapes death. Lakshmi, who was on duty at that time and had injected an initial dose of the pain reliever, is dismissed from duty. Maya leaves the hospital, leaving a gift cover with Savithri to be given to Rajasree by her husband, Arun. When Arun opens the cover the gift eventually turns out to be the fake diamond necklace that he replaced.

Arun drops Lakshmi at the airport and puts the original diamond necklace into her bag, so that she can fulfill the dream that she and her mother had seen the hospital. Although she lost her hair as a result of the treatments, Maya is now shown living a lonely but happy life in a remote Himalayan valley remembering Arun's words to live life without worrying about past and future.

The story ends with Arun realizing that Rajasree loved him more than the diamond necklace (the fake one, a fact that Rajasree was unaware of) that he had given her when she threw it into the ocean to prove her love to him, and the movie ends with him hugging her.

== Cast ==
- Fahadh Faasil as Dr. Arun Kumar, an oncologist based in Dubai
- Anusree as Kalamandalam Rajasree, Arun's wife
- Samvrutha Sunil as Maya
- Gauthami Nair as Nurse Lakshmi, a Tamil native
- Sreenivasan as Venu, Arun's native
- Rohini as Dr. Savithri, Arun's senior doctor
- Maniyanpilla Raju as V. K. Narayana Menon, Rajasree's maternal uncle
- Sreedevi Unni as Susheela Teacher, Arun's mother
- Kailash as Sarath, Arun's childhood friend
- Shivaji Guruvayoor as Gopalan Nair, Rajasree's father
- Sukumari as Rajasree's grandmother
- Mithun Ramesh as Basheer
- Thesni Khan as Sister Santhamma, Arun's co-worker
- Satheesh Menon as Thrissur Mathai
- Rama Devi as Omana, Rajasree's aunt
- Ninin as Pooja Shinde
- Jaya as Sumithra, Rajasree's mother
- Arunkumar as Shukkur
- Raj as Praveen
- Vettoor Sreedharan as Chandrettan
- Moideen Koya as Vijayan
- Asim as Jose
- Prashant Nair as Neurologist
- Joy Alukkas as himself

== Production ==
=== Casting ===
It was widely reported that Amala Paul had agreed to play one of the female leads in the film, however she was later replaced by Gauthami Nair.

=== Filming ===
Filming took place in Dubai between February and March 2012. Filming locations in Dubai included the Armani Residences, Atlantis The Palm, and Dubai Gold Souk.

== Soundtrack ==
Diamond Necklace

Soundtrack album by Vidyasagar
- Released: 5 April 2012
- Recorded: Varshaa Vallaki Studios
- Genre: Feature film soundtrack
- Length: 14:35
- Language: Malayalam
- Label: Satyam Audios
- Producer: Vidyasagar

Vidyasagar chronology
Ordinary (2012)	Diamond Necklace (2012)	Uu Kodathara? Ulikki Padathara? (2012)

The original soundtrack and background score were composed by Vidyasagar, who had earlier collaborated with Lal Jose in his previous films. Rafeeq Ahamed wrote the lyrics for the songs.

All lyrics are written by Rafeeq Ahamed.

Diamond Necklace
No.	Title	Singer(s)	Length
1.	"Nilamalare"	Srinivasan Ragunathan (Nivas)	4:12
2.	"Thottu Thottu"	Najim Arshad, Abhirami Ajai	4:41
3.	"Nenjinullil"	Sanjeev Thomas	4:22
4.	"Hey I am"	Sanjeev Thomas	1:21
Total length:			14:35

== Release ==
Diamond Necklace was released on 4 May 2012, alongside Grandmaster and Mallu Singh on that weekend. In September 2013, Press Trust of India reported that Jose was planning to remake the film in Hindi, however Jose stated that "nothing has been finalised as of now".

== Reception ==
=== Critical reception ===
The film received generally positive reviews. Rediff rated the film 3.5 out of 5 stars and concluded that "One can just end by saying that Lal Jose puts his might behind the change sweeping Malayalam Cinema of late and has come out with a Diamond Necklace that is not to be missed". Times of India gave the film 3 out of 5 stars and commented "it is a beautifully shot movie put together with some stirring moments and hearty one-liners by scriptwriter Dr. Iqbal Kuttippuram".

=== Box office ===
The film was both a critical and commercial success, running for more than 100 days in theatres.

== Accolades ==
- Asianet Youth Icon Award - Fahadh Faasil
- Filmfare Award for Best Supporting Actress – Malayalam - Gauthami Nair
- Filmfare Award for Best Music Director – Malayalam - Vidyasagar
