= Manasam =

- Directed by: CS Sudheesh
- Written by: P. Balachandran
- Screenplay by: P. Balachandran
- Produced by: Francis Palayoor; Raphel T Joseph
- Starring: Dileep; Biju Menon; Srividya; Kaveri
- Music by: Johnson
- Release date: 21 August 1997
- Country: India
- Language: Malayalam

Manasam is a 1997 Indian Malayalam psychological romantic drama film directed by CS Sudheesh (in his directorial debut) and the film stars Dileep in the main protagonist and Biju Menon in the main antagonist with Srividya and Kaveri in female lead roles.

== Synopsis ==
Soloman lost his parents in a car accident and is depressed. After recovery, his brother would not accept him. Rajalakshmi leads a lonely life. She adopts Solomon as her son. Solomon tries to help Rajalakshmi solve her problems. One day, Maya, Menon's granddaughter, visits Rajalakshmi's house. Rajalakshmi reminisces about her childhood, such as when Maya got her childhood face and Soloman got Appu's face.

Appu and Rajalakshmi love each other. Appu is an art culture worker. Rajalakshmi's father Kunjiraman hurt him as his father works for Rajalakshmi's father. Sudhakaran is Rajalakshmi's cousin. He wants to marry Rajalakshmi. Sudhkaran learn about Appu and Rajalakshmi. He beats Kunjiraman to find out Appu. Kunjiraman attempts suicide. Rajalakshmi ready to marry Sudhakaran.

Jayadevan visits Menon to see his mother Rajalakshmi. Rajalakshmi requests Menon to not let Jayadevan stay in Menon's House. Menon rejects Jayadevan as her son. Rajalakshmi learns that her mother died. She informs Menon to take Jayadevan for his grandmother's funeral. Jayadevan visits Rajalakshmi, but she rejected him. She is afraid that Jayadevan will attack Soloman. Kichamani told Menon about Soloman and Maya. Menon dislikes their relationship. Menon is ready to marry Maya to Jayadevan.

Jayadevan tells Menon about his blood cancer. Solomon visits Maya, but Menon beats him. Jayadevan supports Soloman. Some goons attack Soloman. Rajalakshmi blames Jayadevan as he hates Soloman. Menon calls Rajalakshmi as Maya is missing. Menon doubts Soloman. Soloman learns that Maya is at Rajamma's house. Menon accepts Soloman and Maya. Rajalakshmi reminisces about her past when Appu visited Rajalakshmi. Appu tells her he has a job in a town. He is ready to marry Rajalakshmi, but is told she married Sudhakaran. Sudhakaran sees Appu and kills him. Sudhakaran is sentenced to death. Rajalakshmi tries to kill Jayadevan as his father killed Appu. But Jayadevan is dead. Rajalakshmi learns about his blood cancer and cries. She is admitted to a mental asylum. When Soloman and Maya visit Rajalakshmi, she does not recognize them.

== Cast ==
- Dileep in a Dual role as :
  - Solomon, maya's love interest
  - Appu, rajalakshmy's love interest.Killed by Sudhakaran
- Srividya as Rajalakshmy Appu's love interest and Sudhakaran's wife
- Kaveri in a dual role as :
  - Maya,Solomon 'love interest
  - Young Rajalakshmi, appu's love interest
- Biju Menon in a dual role as:
  - Jayadevan, Rajalakshmy's son
  - Sudhakaran, Rajalakshmy's husband, appu's killer, The main antagonist
- Nedumudi Venu as Balakrishnan Menon
- Jagathy Sreekumar as Kichamani
- M. S. Thripunithura as Rajalakshmi's Father
- Ponnamma Babu as Rajalakshmi's Mother
- Priyanka as Rajamma
- Risabava as Doctor
- Yadhukrishnan
- Franlee [Master role]
