= Pullipulikalum Aattinkuttiyum =

- Directed by: Lal Jose
- Written by: M. Sindhuraj
- Produced by: Zulfi Hasis; Shebin Backer
- Starring: Kunchacko Boban; Namitha Pramod; Suraj Venjaramoodu
- Narrated by: Sreenivasan
- Cinematography: S. Kumar
- Edited by: Ranjan Abraham
- Music by: Vidyasagar
- Production company: Balcony 6
- Distributed by: LJ Films
- Release date: 9 August 2013
- Country: India
- Language: Malayalam

Pullipulikalum Aattinkuttiyum (transl. the Leopards and Lamb) is a 2013 Malayalam-language action comedy film directed by Lal Jose and written by M. Sindhuraj. It stars Kunchacko Boban and Namitha Pramod, alongside Suraj Venjaramoodu,Irshad, Joju George, Shiju, Harisree Ashokan, Anusree and Shammi Thilakan. The film tackles social issues in Kuttanad, through the tale of a hapless youth.

== Plot ==
Chakkattutharayil Gopan alias Aadu Gopan is a house boat owner and tourist guide residing in Kuttanad, who doesn't have a satisfying life even though he earns money through his business. He is the sole breadwinner of his family, which consists of his mother and three elder brothers: Maniyan, Vijayan and Suku. The three brothers are good for nothing loafers who spend their day drinking and do odd jobs like threatening people for a living. They have many enemies, who take revenge on the helpless Gopan instead. Gopan also has a business rival, Kavalakkal Kuriyachan.

One day, Gopan manages to get some tourists. But he has to provide them some entertainment. He approaches his friend Mamachan who does multiple jobs such as travel agency and marriage brokering. Mamachan's attitude of doing everything earned him the name 'Enthinum Eathinum Mamachan' (Anything and Everything Mamachan). Mamachan arranges a dancer, Kainakary Jayasree for Gopan's guests. Jayasree's mother Revamma, a former drama actress, is a bit dubious of Gopan and tries to increase their payment day by day. She even fakes an illness with Jayasree for the money. During one such dance, the police come searching for a missing girl. Gopan tells them to search in Kuriyachan's boat and it ends up getting Kuriyachan arrested for immoral trafficking.

Gopan begins to panic, as he thinks Kuriyachan's men will come for revenge. After some comic events involving Kuriyachan, Gopan gets beaten by Kuriyachan's men while taking Jayasree back to her home. In revenge, Gopan's brothers, who realize their mistakes, go to Kuriyachan's house and beat him and his men. After Gopan recovers, he falls for Jayasree. But they get arrested for a fake human trafficking case, which was planned by Kuriyachan. They manage to escape unscathed, after Gopan's brothers and friends threaten the policeman with evidence of bribes and his affairs with other women.

Sometime later, Maniyan suddenly has a chest pain and is taken to the hospital. The doctor informs Gopan that the pain was only acidity from drinking too much alcohol, but Gopan convinces the doctor to tell his brothers that it was a heart attack, sensing an opportunity to change his brothers' way of living. The doctor convinces Maniyan, Suku and Vijayan that they could also have a heart attack if they don't change their habits. The fear of death has the brothers changing their habits and becoming hardworking men. They enter the boat racing team with Maniyan being the team captain. The brothers are also married to their subsequent significant others.

Meanwhile, Revamma, who was against Gopan's and Jayasree's relation, tries many tricks to separate them but is forced to give up. But Kuriyachan's vengeance increases as he was sacked from team captain spot and replaced by Maniyan. He wrecks the race boat and burns Gopan's house boat, which is the only source of income for Gopan's family. He also cheats Revamma, who was trying to sell her home. Heartbroken, Revamma suffers from a heart attack and dies. Not wanting to bring his brothers back to their old rowdy life, Gopan and his friends go to take revenge. They bash up Kuriyachan and his men and leave him to be beaten up by the remaining villagers for destroying the race boat.

In the final scene, Gopan and Jayasree are shown on a boat, planning to live together and to start a new life ahead.

== Cast ==
- Kunchacko Boban as Chakkattutharayil Gopan (Chakka Gopan/Aadu Gopan)
- Namitha Pramod as Kainakary Jayasree, Gopan's love interest turned wife
- Suraj Venjaramoodu as Mamachan, Gopan's friend
- Irshad as Chakkattutharayil Maniyan (Chakka Maniyan), Gopan's eldest brother
- Joju George as Chakkattutharayil Suku (Chakka Suku), Gopan's older brother
- Shiju as Chakkattutharayil Vijayan (Chakka Vijayan), Gopan's older brother
- Harisree Ashokan as Susheelan, Gopan's friend
- Anusree as Kochurani, Vijayan's love interest turned wife
- Shammi Thilakan as Kavalackal Kuriyachan, the main antagonist
- Dinesh Prabhakar as Adv. Ashokan Kunnumpuram, friend of Gopan's brothers
- K. P. A. C. Lalitha as Chakkattutharayil Madhavi (Chakkattamma), Maniyan's, Suku's, Vijayan's and Gopan's mother
- Bindu Panicker as Kainakary Revamma, Jayasree's mother
- Thesni Khan as Jalaja, Maniyan's wife
- Anjana Appukuttan as Ramani, Suku's wife
- Shivaji Guruvayoor as Kapyar (Parish Clerk), Kochurani's father and Soshamma's husband
- Ponnamma Babu as Soshamma, Kochurani's mother and Kapyar's wife
- Reena Basheer as Lissy, Kuriyachan's wife
- Seema G. Nair as Vimala, Revamma's neighbour and friend
- Krishna Prasad as Santhosh, Gopan's friend
- Subeesh as Sranku Babu
- Chali Pala as SI George
- Sreenivasan as Narrator (Voice Only)
- Sunil Babu as 'Joker' Jose

== Soundtrack ==
Two trailers and two songs from the film, "Cheru Cheru" & "Otta Thumbi" from the film were released online. "Koottimuttiya" was also released on YouTube in a video that features Kunchacko Boban and Namitha Pramod.

Pullipulikalum Aattinkuttiyum

Soundtrack album by Vidyasagar
- Released: 7 June 2013
- Recorded: Varshaa Vallaki Studios
- Genre: Feature film soundtrack
- Length: 20:50
- Language: Malayalam
- Label: East Coast Audio Entertainments
- Producer: Vidyasagar

Vidyasagar chronology
Puthiya Thiruppangal (2013)	Pullipulikalum Aattinkuttiyum (2013)	Nadodimannan (2013)

All lyrics are written by Vayalar Sarath; all music is composed by Vidyasagar.

No.	Title	Artist(s)	Length
1.	"Otta Thumbi"	Shankar Mahadevan, K. S. Chithra
2.	"Cheru Cheru"	Afsal, Vidhu Prathap, Sricharan
3.	"Kootti Moottiya"	Najim Arshad, Sujatha Mohan
4.	"Hailasa Hailasa"	Franco Simon, Nikhil Mathew
5.	"Pullipulikal Moonu"	Varsha Renjith
6.	"Shappinte Muttathe"	Vidyasagar, Franco Simon, Nikhil Mathew, Najim Arshad

== Box office ==
The film had a high opening at the Kerala box office. The film collected ₹6 crore from 21 days in Kerala box office. This film was commercial success.
