= Oru Maravathoor Kanavu =

- Poster
- Directed by: Lal Jose
- Written by: Sreenivasan
- Produced by: Siyad Kokker
- Starring: Mammootty; Biju Menon; Mohini; Kalabhavan Mani; Divya Unni; Sreenivasan; Sukumari; Nedumudi Venu
- Cinematography: Vipin Mohan
- Edited by: Ranjan Abraham
- Music by: Vidyasagar
- Production company: Kokers Films
- Distributed by: Kokers; Evershine; Anoopama
- Release date: April 8, 1998
- Running time: 140 minutes
- Country: India
- Language: Malayalam

Oru Maravathoor Kanavu is a 1998 Indian Malayalam comedy-drama musical film directed by Lal Jose and written by Sreenivasan. It stars Mammootty, Biju Menon, Mohini, Divya Unni, Sreenivasan, Kalabhavan Mani, Sukumari and Nedumudi Venu. The music was composed by Vidyasagar.

It was the directorial debut of Lal Jose, who had previously worked as an assistant director in many Malayalam films. Playback singer Devanand also debuted through this film. The film was a box-office success. The core plot of the movie is based on the 1986 French movie Jean de Florette (itself an adaptation of Marcel Pagnol’s 1963 novel The Water of the Hills).

== Plot ==
Michael, his wife Mary and their son buy a farmland in Maravathoor that is coveted by a rich man named Palanichamy. In order to drive away all prospective buyers, Palanichamy and his nephew Maruthu try everything. When they realise that Michael has bought the farm, they block up a spring water source on the farm to make things hard for Michael and ultimately force him to sell the farm.

Michael and his family stay with Annie and her grandmother at their house while they work on the farm. The farm struggles due to water shortage, and Michael's vices (gambling and alcoholism) add to the hardship. To support Michael, his brother Chandy comes to Maravathoor. Chandy is an active party worker in Southern Kerala and acts as a muscle for his party's needs. His arrival changes the fortunes of the farm and halts the activities of Palanichamy.

To support Chandy's activities, Antappan and friends (party workers/goons) arrive as well from Chandy's hometown. To eliminate the threat of Chandy, Palanichamy spreads a rumour of an illicit relationship between Michael's wife, Mary and Chandy. Evil plans of the rich man comes to a fruition when one morning Maravathoor wakes to the news that Chandy and Mary have run away together.

The movie ends with Chandy coming back to bury his deceased brother Michael and facing the wrath of his nephew and the villagers. He explains that he left that day earlier because the leader of his political party, Korah Sir had died. Later, Michael had come to see Chandy and under the influence of alcohol said that he had gambled away his money and accidentally caused the death of his wife. Michael also told Chandy about the rumor that had been passing around the village and Chandy comforted Michael not to worry and to let the rumor be as it is. He gives the replies to the letters that he received from Michael to Michael's son which in turn proves Chandy's innocence. The scandal is resolved, and Chandy finds his home again in Maravathoor.

== Cast ==
- Mammootty as Chandy "Chandy Kunju"
- Biju Menon as Michael
- Mohini as Mary
- Divya Unni as Annie
- Sreenivasan as Maruthu
- Kalabhavan Mani as Antappan
- Augustine as Moidheen
- James as Kuttapayi
- Sukumari as Grandmother of Annie
- Nedumudi Venu as Palanichamy
- Oduvil Unnikrishnan as Kunjoottychayan
- Meghanathan as driver Thankappan
- Baburaj as Devassykkutty
- Sadiq as Johny
- Ottapalam Pappan as Father Alex
- Cherthala Lalitha as Maria

== Soundtrack ==
The soundtrack features seven songs composed by Vidyasagar, with lyrics by Gireesh Puthenchery.

#	Title	Singer(s)
1	"Kanninila"	Biju Narayanan, Sujatha Mohan
2	"Kanninila"	K. S. Chithra, Chorus
3	"Karunaamayane"	K. S. Chitra
4	"Karunaamayane"	K. J. Yesudas
5	"Mohamaay"	K. S. Chithra, Raveendran
6	"Pandengadee Naattil"	K. S. Chithra, Chorus
7	"Sundariye Sundariye"	K. J. Yesudas, Pushpavanam Kuppusamy, Sujatha Mohan
8	"Thaarakkoottam"	M. G. Sreekumar, G. Venugopal, Srinivas
9	"Thinkalkkuri"	K. S. Chithra, Raveendran (Music: Raveendran)
10	"Thinkalkkuri"	Devanand, K. S. Chithra, Raveendran (Music: Raveendran)

== Box office ==
The film was both commercial and critical success.It had a 130 days theatrical run.

== Legacy ==
The film was earlier planned to title with the name or Priyamulla ChandikunjeKuttiyil Chandi. Mammooty was planned this name earlier, and later it got titled with the current name. The name Kuttiyil Chandi became a troll material by means of social medias and it's also made by Mohanlal fans to create vulger trolls against Mammootty.
