= Shivaji Guruvayoor =

Indian actor

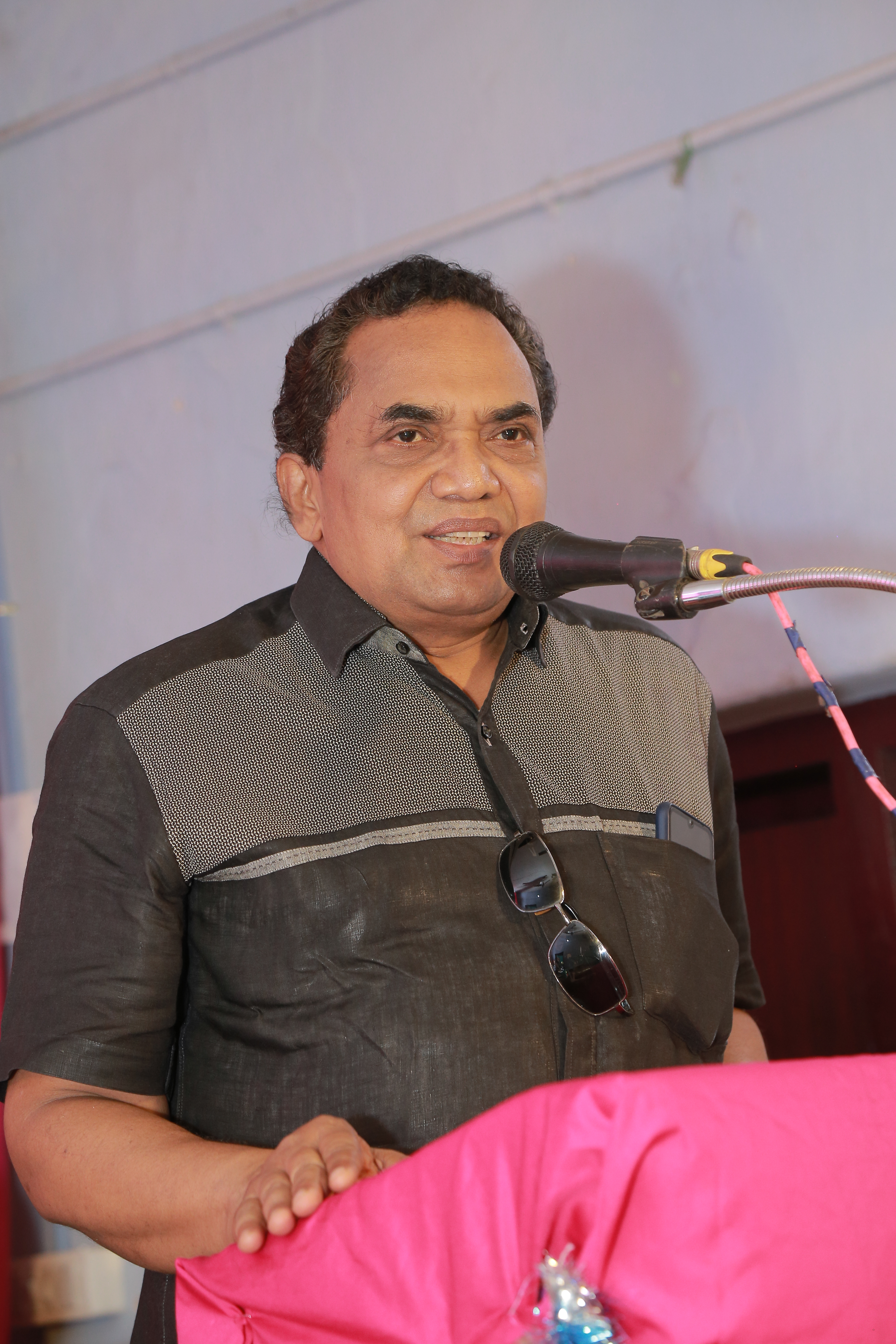
- Shivaji Guruvayoor speaks in Jnana Saradhi preview ceremony
- Born: 28 May 1961 (age 65); Guruvayoor, Thrissur, Kerala, India
- Education: Sree Krishna College, Guruvayur
- Occupation: Actor
- Years active: 1990 – present
- Spouse: Lilly
- Children: 2

Shivaji Guruvayoor (born 28 May 1961) is an Indian actor who works in Malayalam cinema. He started his film career with the film Arabikkatha. He is known for his negative roles and character roles.

== Personal life ==
He is married to Lilly and has two sons.

== Filmography ==
Key
†	Denotes films that have not yet been released

- All films are in Malayalam language unless otherwise noted.

Year	Title	Role	Notes
2007	Arabikkatha	Sakhavu Karunan	
2008	Aayudham		
2008	Sulthan		
2008	Veruthe Oru Bharya	Chackochan	
2008	Chithrasalabhangalude Veedu		
2008	Madampi		
2008	One Way Ticket		
2008	Mulla	Bhadran	
2008	Thirakkatha		
2009	Pramukhan	Erode Bhadran Thampuran	
2009	Samayam		
2009	Malayali	Georgettan	
2009	I. G. – Inspector General	Dineshan, Party Secretary	
2009	Swapnamalika		
2009	Swantham Lekhakan	Madhavan	
2009	Keralotsavam 2009		
2009	Passenger	Station Master	
2009	Bhagavan	Zachariah Thomas	
2009	Bharya Onnu Makkal Moonnu	Sachidanandan Thampi	
2009	Kadha, Samvidhanam Kunchakko	Sadanandan	
2009	Sagar Alias Jacky Reloaded		
2009	Samastha Keralam PO	Dasa	
2010	Valiyangadi	Anandhu's father	
2010	Pulliman		
2010	Janakan	Home Minister Divakaran	
2010	Thaskara Lahala	Home Minister	
2010	Aakashayathra		
2010	Nanthuni		
2010	Penpattanam	SI Balachandran	
2010	The Thriller	DGP Eapen IPS	
2010	Puthumukhangal	Partham Pillai	
2010	Kanmazha Peyyum Mumpe		
2010	Advocate Lakshmanan – Ladies Only		
2010	Pranchiyettan & the Saint	Antony Master	
2010	Annarakkannanum Thannalayathu		
2010	Thanthonni	Adv. Charlie	
2010	Kadaksham		
2010	Sadgamaya		
2011	Christian Brothers	IG Chandradas IPS	
2011	Pachuvum Kovalanum	Production Controller	
2011	The Filmstaar		
2011	Indian Rupee		
2011	Vellaripravinte Changathi		
2011	Swargam Nine Kilometer		
2011	Rajavum Ammayum		
2011	Sevenes		
2011	Azhakadal	Pappichayan	
2011	Orma Mathram		
2011	Swapna Sanchari	Bank Manager	
2011	Shankaranum Mohananum		
2011	Mohabbath		
2012	Veendum Kannur	Madayi Surendran	
2012	Diamond Necklace	Gopalan Nair	
2012	Run Baby Run	Minister Kunju Moidheen	
2012	Josettante Hero	Rahul Krishnadas	
2012	Akasmikam		
2012	Jawan of Vellimala		
2012	Molly Aunty Rocks!	Menon	
2012	Scene Onnu Nammude Veedu	Rajan	
2012	Mr. Marumakan		
2012	Chapters		
2012	Spirit		
2012	Nidra	Bhaskara Menon	
2012	Spanish Masala	Cyril, Charlie's father	
2012	Pedithondan		
2012	Face 2 Face	DGP Nandakishore Varma IPS	
2012	Ennennum Ormakkayi		
2012	Crime Story		
2012	Thappana		
2012	Achante Aanmakkal	Vishwambaran	
2012	Nadabrahmam		
2013	Romans	Bishop Idachal	
2013	Kammath & Kammath		
2013	Pullipulikalum Aattinkuttiyum	Francis	
2013	ABCD: American-Born Confused Desi	Vennala Gopalan	
2013	Ladies and Gentleman	Kunjunni	
2013	Nadodimannan	Hameed	
2013	Radio		
2013	Lokpal	Muraleedharan	
2013	Mr. Bean		
2013	72 Model	Govindan	
2013	Red Wine	Commissioner George Joseph IPS	
2013	Bharya Athra Pora	Advocate	
2013	Immanuel	Simon	
2013	Aattakatha	Sekharan Nair	
2013	Punyalan Agarbattis	Hassan Marakkar	
2014	God's Own Country		
2014	Sapthamashree Thaskaraha	Xavier	
2015	Kasthoorba	Khan Saheb	
2015	Signal		
2015	TP 51		
2015	KL 10 Patthu	Beeran	
2015	Kunjiramayanam		
2015	Ennu Ninte Moideen	Kanchana's uncle	
2016	Happy wedding	Shahina's Father	
2016	Zoom	Hotel MD	
2016	Kappiri Thuruthu		
2016	Dooram		
2017	Jomonte Suvisheshangal	Ravunni	
2017	Velipadinte Pusthakam	Fr. George Kaattu Paramban	
2017	Adventures of Omanakuttan	Sreedharan Nair	
2017	Seethakali		
2017	Chicken Kokkachi		
2018	Puzha		
2018	Daivame Kaithozham K. Kumar Akanam		
2019	Lucifer	Medayil Rajan	
2019	My Great Grandfather	Shivan's Father	
2019	Odunnon		
2019	Brother's Day	Faizal Mohammed	
2019	Driving License	Saheer	
2020	Cochin Shadhi at Chennai 03	Bus Driver	
2021	Who is Right		Short film
2021	Ayisha Weds Sameer		
2022	Solamante Theneechakal	Commissioner of Police	
2022	Pathonpatham Noottandu	Cherthala Naduvazhi	
2022	Swapnasundari	Zachariah Punnoose	
2022	Kadal Kuthira		
2023	Pappachan Olivilanu	Fr. Geevarghese	
2023	Corona Dhavan	DSP Antony Thomas	
2023	Aadhiyum Ammuvum		
2023	Jaladhara Pumpset Since 1962	Sub-inspector Rajendran	
2023	Imbam	Adv. Bhaskara Pillai	
2024	Aaro		
2025	Empuraan	Medayil Rajan	
2025	The Protector		
2025	Sambavasthalathu Ninnum		
2026	Faces		
2026	Kalam Paranja Kadha		

== Television career ==
Year	Title	Channel	Notes
2010	Karunyam	DD Malayalam	
2011-2012	Manasaveena	Mazhavil Manorama	
2012	Chandralekha	Asianet TV	
2011-2012	Avakashikal	Surya TV	
2016	Jagratha	Amrita TV	
2017	Kayamkulam Kochunniyude Makan	Surya TV	
2018	Decemberile Aakasham	Amrita TV	
2019	Thamarathumbi	Surya TV	
2019-2020	Kathayariyathe	Flowers TV	Won Kerala State Television Award for Best Actor
2020–2022	Raakkuyil	Mazhavil Manorama	
2020	Sri Lokanarkavilamma	Kaumudy TV	
2021	Ente Maathavu	Surya TV	
2021–2022	Nandanam	Flowers TV	
2023	Gouri Shankaram	Asianet	
2023	Kudumbavilakku	Asianet	
2023–2024	Radiogramam 2.0	Saina Play	Web series
2024	Perilloor Premier League	Disney+ Hotstar	Web series
2024–2025	Meenu's Kitchen	Mazhavil Manorama	
2025–present	Advocate Anjali	Asianet	
