= Ammathottil =

Ammathottil (also called Amma Thottil in Malayalam, meaning "Cradle") is an initiative by the Government of Kerala under The Kerala State Council for Child Welfare to provides care and services for abandoned children.

The Kerala State Council for Child Welfare has passed laws, and as part of these legislative actions, an automatic "Baby Cradle" was established at the council's headquarters in Thiruvananthapuram, where women can bring unwanted children rather than leaving them in trash receptacles. The hope is that by offering such an alternative to abandonment, women might leave their children with people who can help the child. It is situated in the heart of Thiruvananthapuram.

Ammathottil was started in Trivandrum 2002 November 14.
