= Double Tuckerr =

- Theatrical release poster
- Directed by: Meera Mahadhi
- Written by: Meera Mahadhi
- Starring: Dheeraj; Smruthi Venkat
- Cinematography: Gautham Rajendran
- Edited by: Vetrivel A.S
- Music by: Vidyasagar
- Production company: Air Flick
- Distributed by: PVR Inox Pictures
- Release date: 5 April 2024
- Running time: 120 minutes
- Country: India
- Language: Tamil

Double Tuckerr is 2024 Indian Tamil-language live-action animated fantasy comedy film written and directed by Meera Mahadhi. The film stars Dheeraj and Smurthi Venkat. The film was produced by Air Flick and co-produced by Chandru. The film is based on the life after death. It was released on 5 April 2024. The film marked only the second film appearance for prominent Chennai based cardiovascular surgeon Dheeraj who portrayed the main lead role in the film. The film also includes two animated angel characters named "left" and "right" in the prominent roles. It was also the first instance where a Tamil film used the concept of angels.

== Plot ==
Aravind has been gifted with two angels in his life ever since his birth. However, his life dramatically changes forever when one of the angels commits an error that accidentally costs him his life, resulting in his untimely demise.

== Cast ==
- Dheeraj as Aravind and Raja
- Munishkanth as Left, Aravind's good side angel
- Kaali Venkat as Right, Aravind's bad side angel
- Smruthi Venkat as Paaru
- Kovai Sarala as Shanmugavalli
- M. S. Bhaskar as Brammanantham
- Sunil Reddy as Rocker Reddy
- Shah Ra as Murder Mani
- Karunakaran as Moorthy
- Yashika Aannand as Velvet Vennila
- George Vijay as Madhi
- Teddy Gokul as Sillu Vandu

== Production ==
Double Tuckerr is the directorial debut of Meera Mahadhi. The film includes both live action and animation. The film project was initially planned to be based on a storyline featuring Yama and Chitragupta with the idea of casting Yogi Babu and Munishkanth. However the idea was shelved as Yogi Babu had already done a film similar to the storyline involving the characters of Yama and Chitragupta in Dharmaprabhu. The filmmakers then came up with a paradigm shift approach by bringing in the concept of angels and children were kept as the prime target audience for the film project.

Dheeraj, who has been serving as a cardiovascular surgeon in Chennai for a long time, had shown his ambitious efforts in pursuing a film career and opted to choose the film after listening to the script with eagerness. Dheeraj had previously involved in short films such as Dheergayushmman Bhava. He made his acting debut in Bodhai Yeri Buddhi Maari whereas Dheeraj received fame and recognition for his role in the film which also opened floodgates for himself.

== Critical reception ==
Roopa Radhakrishnan of The Times of India wrote, "There are moments when Double Tuckerr truly comes into its own; it's solely in those moments that the film lives up to and justifies its absurd spirit. But, otherwise, this Meera Mahadhi directorial isn't half as quirky or distinctive as it considers itself to be". Narayani M of Cinema Express rated two star out of five star and noted that "Double Tuckerr has some clever ideas and a very interesting premise." Ananda Vikatan wrote that mainly, the visual effects and animation work for the multi-incarnated fairy puppets and the dialogues they speak make the film stand out.
