= Chanthupottu =

2005 film by Lal Jose

- The music CD cover
- Directed by: Lal Jose
- Written by: Benny P Nayarambalam
- Produced by: Lal
- Starring: Dileep; Indrajith Sukumaran; Lal; Biju Menon; Gopika; Bhavana
- Cinematography: Alagappan N
- Edited by: Ranjan Abraham
- Music by: Vidyasagar
- Distributed by: Lal Release & PJ Entertainments
- Release date: 26 August 2005
- Running time: 125 minutes
- Country: India
- Language: Malayalam

Chanthupottu is a 2005 Indian Malayalam-language romantic comedy-drama film directed by Lal Jose, written by Benny P. Nayarambalam, and produced by Lal. The film was based on a play of the same name, which in turn, was based on the life of an actual man with feminine mannerisms. The story is about a man named Radhakrishnan (Dileep) who was brought up like a girl by his grandmother. The film was a commercial success at the box office.

== Plot ==
Radhakrishnan is raised as a girl by his grandmother who wanted a granddaughter. She calls him Radha, which becomes his nickname. Radha's father Divakaran, a fisherman, goes to jail for an accidental murder. Radha is ridiculed among the people in the village as he is considered effeminate. However, he is not bothered and spends time with the girls, singing and teaching dance. His best friend is Malu who is wooed by Kumaran, a local money lender and the son of the man whom Radha's father had killed in a fight when Kumaran harasses Radha for behaving like a girl.

Divakaran returns from jail and dislikes his son's mannerisms, but is helpless. Slowly, Radha's liking for Malu turns into love. When Kumaran learns of this, he beats up Radha with the help of her father Thorayil Aashan, a local astrologer, and dumps him in the deep sea by saying he is a curse to the shore. Radha is saved by Freddy, a restaurant owner, on a distant shore. Freddy takes him to his home where he lives with his sister, Rosie, and his grandmother who is a mental patient due to the shock of the sudden death of Freddy's other sibling, Jonfy. He soon becomes a part of their family as the grandmother begins to identify him as the late Jonfy. With a change in environment, Radha also tries to change his behaviour, adopting more traditionally male mannerisms. One day, Radha fights with Cleetus, an old enemy of Freddy, when Cleetus tries to molest Rosie. During the fight, Cleetus suffers a head injury, so Radha returns to his home to escape from the police.

On reaching his native shore, he discovers that his family, along with his house, was burned down by Kumaran. He also learns that Malu is pregnant with his child. His arrival follows a fight with Kumaran. Towards the end of the fight, Radha defeats Kumaran and when he is about to kill him, Malu arrives. He spares Kumaran by telling that he needs to live with Malu and his child. Radha reunites with Malu. Kumaran tries to kill Radha and Malu but the villagers save them and hit Kumaran. They threaten to kill him if he returns to the shore again. In the meantime, Malu prematurely gives birth to Radha's child. When Radha sees the child, he vows to raise it as a boy, ripping off the ribbon tied to its hair as the baby is a male. The movie ends with Radha going to the sea as a fisherman, an occupation which he refused to do in his early life.

== Cast ==
- Dileep as Radhakrishnan (Radha)
- Indrajith Sukumaran as Komban Kumaran
  - Balu Varghese as Young Kumaran
- Lal as Divakaran, Radha's father
- Biju Menon as Freddy
- Gopika as Malathi (Malu) (voice over by Sreeja Ravi)
- Bhavana as Rosie, Freddy's sister (Voice over by Meera)
- Rajan P. Dev as Thorayil Aashan, Malu's father
- Mala Aravindan as Kanaran, Divakaran's friend and neighbour
- Shobha Mohan as Shantha, Radha's mother (Voice over by Anandavally)
- Koottickal Jayachandran as Lawrence, Kanaran's son-in-law & Radha's friend
- Kalabhavan Shajohn as Peter
- Salim Kumar as "Paradooshanam" Vareed, a tea shop owner
- Sukumari as Bhavaniyamma, Radha's grandmother
- Cherthala Lalitha as Karthu, Kanaran's wife
- Anil Murali as Bhaskaran, Kumaran's father
- Sreejith Ravi as Cleetus
- Valsala Menon as Freddy's and Rosie's grandmother
- Unni S Nair as Cherukandath Suppran
- Joju George as (Cameo)
- George Peter as Freddy's friend
- Renjusha as Ramani

== Music ==
Chanthupottu

Soundtrack album by Vidyasagar
- Released: 2005
- Genre: Feature film soundtrack

Vidyasagar chronology
Chanthupottu (2005)	Rasikan (2004)

1. "Azhakadalinte" – S. Janaki
2. "Azhakadalinte" (Male) - P Jayachandran
3. "Omanapuzha" – Vineeth Sreenivasan
4. "Chanthu Kudanjoru" – Shahabaz Aman, Sujatha Mohan
5. "Kana Ponnum" – Franko, Ranjith, Chorus

== LGBT controversies ==
The film was criticized by the LGBT community of Kerala for its distorted portrayal of gender and sexuality. In 2019, queer activists reported that the word "chanthupottu" was used to harass transgender persons and pointed at the deeply problematic idea that beatings and a heterosexual relationship could "correct" behaviour that goes against traditional gender norms. Prabhakaran and Poovathingal (2013) argue that "the movie brought forth traditional machismo of the male hero and defined an unsophisticated masculinity", despite its attempts to portray an effeminate man in a positive light. Director Lal Jose responded to the claims by saying that "In the movie, Radha or Radhakrishnan is a man, he is not a transgender person. There is no doubt about his gender. He falls in love with a woman, has a child from the woman. The only thing was that he had an effeminate aspect to his behaviour. There is no gender issue in that film.”

== Box office ==
The film was a commercial success.
