= Ranjan Abraham =

Indian film editor

- Born: Ranjan Abraham; Kerala, India
- Occupation: Film editor
- Years active: 1998–present

Ranjan Abraham is an Indian film editor who predominantly works in Malayalam films. He has worked over 100 Malayalam films. He started as an assistant of noted editor G. Venkitaraman. His first independent assignment was Maravathoorkanavu directed by debutant Lal Jose. He frequently collaborated with Joshiy, Lal Jose, Johny Antony and Vineeth Sreenivasan.

== Career ==
He has debuted in Lal Jose directorial movie Oru Maravathoorkanavu in 1998. Since then he has been a regular editor of directors like Lal Jose, Vineeth Sreenivasan, Renjith, Johny Antony, Roshan Andrrews and Joshy.

Ranjan is from Kerala and now stays at Valsarvakom, Chennai with his wife and daughter. His works includes Meesa madhavan, Classmates, Udayananu Tharam, Thuruppugulan (2006 film), Rajamanikyam, C.I.D.Moosa, Raavanaprabhu and Thattathin Marayathu.

== Filmography ==
=== Film editor ===
Year	Title	Notes
1998	Oru Maravathoor Kanavu	
1999	Chandranudikkunna Dikkil	
1999	English Medium	
2000	Dreams	
2001	Ravanaprabhu	
2001	Ee Parakkum Thalika	
2001	Randam Bhavam	
2001	Saivar Thirumeni	
2002	In the Name of Buddha	
2002	Mazhathullikkilukkam	
2002	Meesa Madhavan	
2003	Pattanathil Sundaran	
2003	Ammakilikkoodu	
2003	Mizhi Randilum	
2003	Melvilasam Sariyanu	
2003	Pattalam	
2003	C.I.D. Moosa	
2003	Mr. Brahmachari	
2004	Oridam	
2004	Runway	
2005	Rajamanikyam	
2005	Chanthupottu	
2005	Kochi Rajavu	
2005	Udayananu Tharam	
2005	Naran	
2006	Notebook	
2006	Pothan Vava	
2006	Classmates	
2006	Vargam	
2006	Cineku (short)	
2006	Lion	
2007	Katha Parayumpol	
2007	Nasrani	
2007	Arabikkatha	
2007	July 4	
2007	Speed Track	
2007	Inspector Garud	
2008	Sultan	
2008	Twenty:20	
2008	Veruthe Oru Bharya	
2008	One Way Ticket	
2008	Cycle	
2008	Mulla	
2008	Pachamarathanalil	
2009	Ee Pattanathil Bhootham	
2009	Passenger	
2009	Kaana Kanmani	
2009	Neelathamara	
2009	Robin Hood	
2009	Samastha Keralam PO	
2010	Kaalchilambu	
2010	Malarvaadi Arts Club	
2010	Advocate Lakshmanan – Ladies Only	
2011	Sevenes	
2011	Orma Mathram	
2011	Christian Brothers	
2011	Payyans	
2011	Arjunan Saakshi	
2012	Masters	
2012	Perinoru Makan	
2012	Diamond Necklace	
2012	Thattathin Marayathu	
2012	Thappana	
2012	Ayalum Njanum Thammil	
2012	916	
2013	Red Wine	
2013	Pullipulikalum Aattinkuttiyum	
2013	Thira	
2014	Polytechnic	
2014	Vikramadithyan	
2014	Bhaiyya Bhaiyya	
2015	Picket 43	
2015	Mariyam Mukku	
2015	Oru Vadakkan Selfie	
2015	Kanal	
2015	Anarkali	
2015	Rajamma @ Yahoo	
2015	My God	
2016	Jalam	
2016	Moonam Naal Njayarazhcha	
2016	Dhanayathra	
2016	Jacobinte Swargarajyam	
2016	Thoppil Joppan	
2016	Ore Mukham	
2017	Oru Cinemakkaran	
2017	Velipadinte Pusthakam	
2018	Aravindante Athidhikal	
2018	Paviyettante Madhurachooral	
2018	Pappu	
2018	Thattumpurath Achuthan	
2019	Sathyam Paranja Viswasikkuvo	
2019	Sachin	
2019	Naalpathiyonnu	
2020	Ayyappanum Koshiyum	
2021	Kunjeldho	
2021	Meow	
2022	Hridayam	
2022	Solamante Theneechakal	
2023	Kurukkan	
2023	Cheena Trophy	
2024	Varshangalkku Shesham	
2025	Oru Jaathi Jaathakam	
2025	Karam	
2025	Ambalamukkile Visheshangal	
2025	Bha. Bha. Ba.	
2026	Uyir	

== Awards ==
- Kerala State Film Award for Best Editor for C.I.D. Moosa (2003)
- Asianet Film Award for Best Editing for C.I.D. Moosa (2003)
- Asianet Film Award for Best Editing for Chanthupottu (2005)
- Asianet Film Award for Best Editing for Classmates (2006)
- Asianet Film Award for Best Editing for Veruthe Oru Bharya (2008)
