= Varsha Vallaki Studios =

Indian recording studio

- Type: Recording studio
- Genre: Various
- Founder: Vidyasagar
- Headquarters: T. Nagar, Chennai, India
- Key people: Vidyasagar (Founder)
- Products: Music
- Owner: Vidyasagar

Varshaa Vallaki is the recording studio founded by Indian film composer & singer Vidyasagar at Chennai, Tamil Nadu. Many of his songs are recorded at this studio.

== Profile ==
It was established by Vidyasagar. It has in its credit number of audio albums mainly associated with him. Now it continues to produce songs which is composing by him.

== Vidyasagar's engineers ==
- M. Senthil Kumar
- Murugan
