= Satyam Audios =

Indian record company

- Industry: Music
- Genre: Various
- Founded: 1990s
- Headquarters: Kochi, India
- Products: Music
- Owner: Premachandran AG
- Parent: Sony Music India
- Website: satyamaudios.com

Satyam Audios is an Indian record label based in Kochi, Kerala. They cover a large portion of the music labels in Kerala. They have produced and distributed film soundtracks, poems, pop albums, soundtrack & pop singles, including “Jimmiki kammal” and the latest songs of Mohanlal’s film “Odiyan”. They also work with and coach musicians.

The label also includes a production house called “Satyam Cinemas.”
