= Vidyasagar (composer) =

Indian music composer (born 1963)

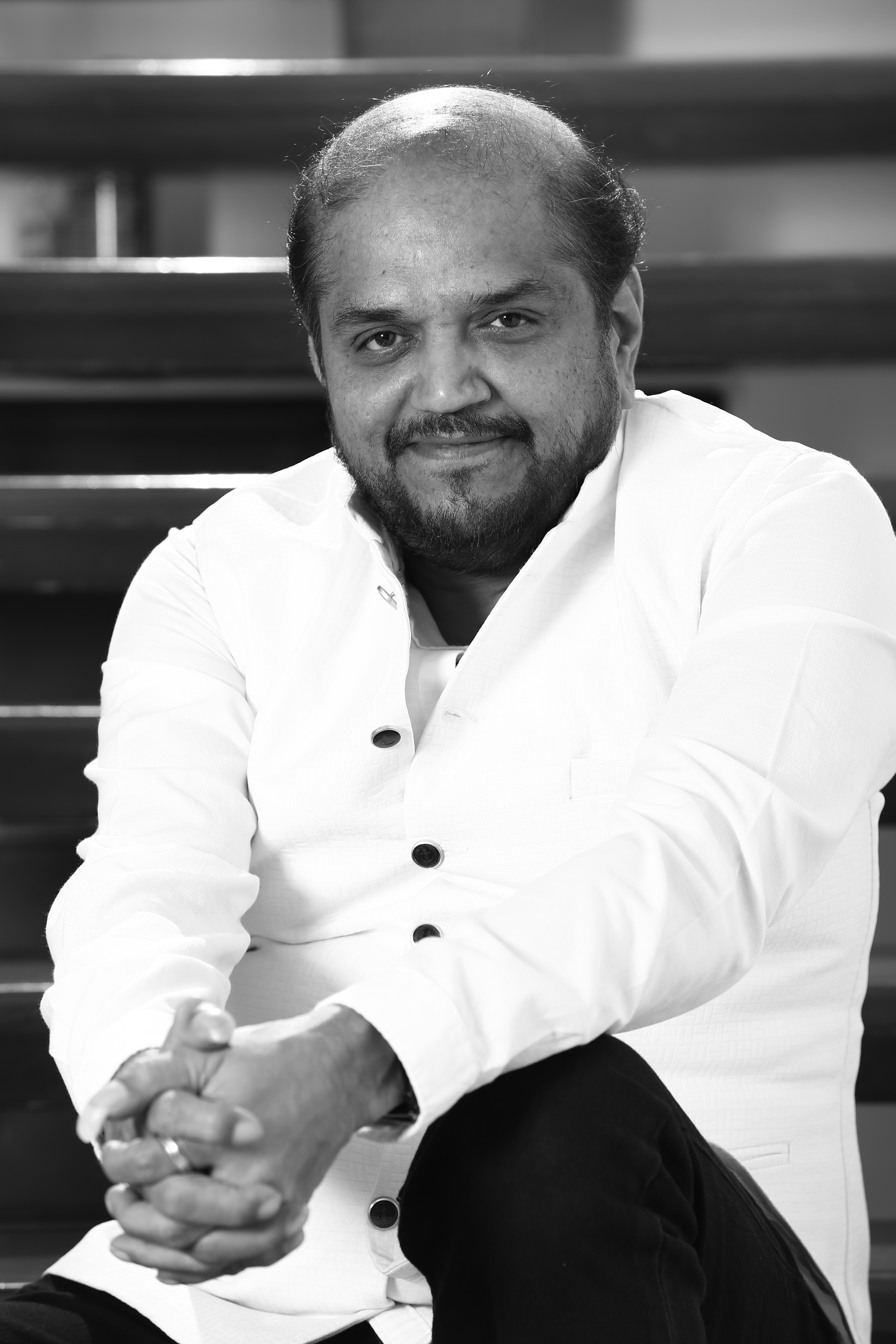
- Vidya Sagar in 2018

Background information
- Born: Upadrasta Vidya Sagar; 2 March 1963 (age 63); Vizianagaram, Andhra Pradesh, India
- Genres: Film score, dance music, classical music
- Occupations: Singer; songwriter; composer; record producer; music director; arranger; conductor
- Instruments: Harmonium, santoor, vibraphone, keyboard, piano, guitar, vocal.
- Years active: 1989–present

Upadrasta Vidya Sagar (born 2 March 1963), better known as Vidyasagar, is an Indian composer, musician and singer who works predominantly in the Tamil, Malayalam, and Telugu film industries. After working with several composers as assistant and conductor, Vidyasagar made his debut as a film composer in the 1989 Tamil film Poo Manam and is nicknamed as "Melody King". Working for over 225 feature films, he is the recipient of one National Award, multiple State Awards and five Filmfare Awards. He is widely regarded as one of the finest and most acclaimed composers in the history of Indian cinema.

== Life and career ==
Vidyasagar was born into a Telugu-speaking family to Upadrasta Ramachandra Rao, a musician, and Suryakantham in Vizianagaram, Andhra Pradesh. His grandfather was a court vidwan in Bobbili Samsthanam.

Vidyasagar is settled in Chennai. He is married and has 2 daughters and a son. One of his daughters, Susarla Pallavi, is a social media influencer. His son, Harsha Vardhan, works as a musician and programmer in independent Tamil music videos. He underwent Carnatic vocals training first and then started taking classical guitar classes in Chennai from Master Dhanraj and then later piano.

Vidyasagar became an independent film composer with the song En Anbe in the 1989 Tamil movie Poomanam. Vidyasagar started his music career with a Tamil film, he gained recognition in the Tamil music industry at a later stage. He also started composing for Telugu Films in 1989.

In 1993–94, Vidya Sagar was approached by Tamil actor-director Arjun, with whom he worked for many musical films like Jai Hind, Karna and Subash. Their combination resulted in acclaimed Tamil language melodic songs like Malare and Paadu .. Paadu.

From 1996 to 2001 Vidyasagar mainly concentrated on Malayalam films. During this period, Vidyasagar also composed for a few Tamil movies like Nilaave Vaa and Uyirodu Uyiraga. He won three Kerala State Film Awards. About his stint in the Malayalam cinema, Vidyasagar was quoted saying "I believe that it was a God sent opportunity for me to work in one of the finest film industries".

From the year 2001, he started composing soundtracks for Dhil, Run, Dhool, Ghilli etc. in Tamil and Summer in Bethlehem, Meesha Madhavan, Kilichundan Mampazham, Pattalam, C.I.D. Moosa etc. in Malayalam. His Bollywood venture Hulchul directed by Priyadarshan was a box-office blockbuster, but the songs only became nominal hits, not bringing him the acclaim he was usually used to in Tamil and Malayalam films.

During this period, Vidyasagar became the first South Indian Composer to have composed for an English language feature, Beyond The Soul, an Indo American film directed by Rajiv Anchal.

Between 2003 and 2005, he composed songs for several notable films like Anbe Sivam, Madhurey, Kochi Rajavu, Ji and Chandrolsavam in 2004–05. The year 2005 saw Vidyasagar receiving his first National Film Awards for his music in the Telugu film Swarabhishekam directed by K. Vishwanath. The music in the film was predominantly Carnatic. The same year, he composed music for the film Chandramukhi.

In 2007, Vidyasagar was signed by Prakash Raj for his production venture Mozhi starring Prithviraj Sukumaran and Jyothika. The film directed by Radha Mohan had critically acclaimed melodies like Kaatrin Mozhiye and Sevvanam. The songs of Mozhi had the distinction of being completely devoid of duets. In 2008 Vidyasagar's notable releases were Vijay's Kuruvi and the Priyadarshan directed Mere Baap Pehle Aap in Hindi.

After his brief dull phase in Malayalam, he made a comeback into the scene with the Lal Jose directorial Neelathamara, scripted by M.T. Vasudevan Nair, with the song "Anuraga Vilochananaayi" becoming a favorite. He followed it up with hits in Apoorva Ragam and Makeup Man. Meanwhile, in Tamil, he delivered hits with Karthi's Siruthai and Vijay's Kaavalan.

In 2012, Vidyasagar had three releases in Malayalam with Diamond Necklace, Thappana and Ordinary.

In 2013, Priyadarshan signed him in for his film, Geethaanjali in Malayalam with Mohanlal in the lead role. Lal Jose's Pullipulikalum Aattinkuttiyum and Jannal Oram, the Tamil remake of Ordinary were his other releases of the year. The end of veteran filmmaker Sathyan Anthikkad's 10-film long collaboration with composer Ilaiyaraaja saw him collaborate with Vidyasagar for the film Oru Indian Pranayakatha. Sathyan Anthikad continued his collaboration with Vidyasagar for his next 2 films, Ennum Eppozhum (released in 2015) and Jomonte Suvisheshangal (released in 2017).

== See also ==
- List of films directed by Lal Jose featuring Vidyasagar
- Varsha Vallaki Studios
