= List of awards and nominations received by Manju Warrier =

Manju Warrier

Manju Warrier is an Indian actress and dancer who primarily appears in Malayalam films. She is one of the most successful leading actresses in Malayalam cinema.

Warrier won the National Film Award – Special Mention for her performance as Bhadra in Kannezhuthi Pottum Thottu. She also won the Kerala State Film Award for Best Actress for her performance as Anjali in Ee Puzhayum Kadannu, along with six Filmfare Awards for Best Actress, a record in that category.. She also won the Tamil Nadu State Film Award for Best Actress for her performance as Pachaiyamal in Asuran.

== National Film Awards ==
Year	Category	Film	Result
1999	Special Mention (Best Actress)	Kannezhuthi Pottum Thottu	Won

== Kerala State Film Awards ==
Year	Category	Film	Result	Ref.
1996	Best Actress	Ee Puzhayum Kadannu	Won	

== Tamil Nadu State Film Awards ==
Year	Category	Film	Result	Ref.
2019	Best Actress	Asuran	Won	

== Filmfare Awards South ==
Year	Category	Film	Result	Ref.
1996	Best Actress (Malayalam)	Ee Puzhayum Kadannu	Won	
1997	Best Actress (Malayalam)	Kaliyattam & Aaram Thamburan	Won	
1998	Best Actress (Malayalam)	Kanmadam	Won	
1999	Best Actress (Malayalam)	Pathram	Won	
2014	Best Actress (Malayalam)	How Old Are You	Won	
2015	Best Actress (Malayalam)	Rani Padmini	Nominated	
2016	Best Actress (Malayalam)	Karinkunnam 6's	Nominated	
2017	Best Actress (Malayalam)	Udaharanam Sujatha	Nominated	
2017	Critics Best Actress (Malayalam)	Udaharanam Sujatha	Won	
2018	Best Actress (Malayalam)	Aami	Won	
2024	Best Actress (Malayalam)	Ayisha	Nominated	

== Kerala Film Critics Association Awards ==
Year	Category	Film	Result	Ref.
1996	Best Actress	Sallapam, Ee Puzhayum Kadannu, Thooval Kottaram	Won	
1999	Special Jury Mention	Kannezhuthi Pottum Thottu	Won	
2017	Best Actress	Udaharanam Sujatha & C/O Saira Banu	Won	
2019	Best Actress	Prathi Poovankozhi	Won	

== Screen Videocon Awards ==
Year	Category	Film	Result
1996	Best Actress (Malayalam)	Ee Puzhayum Kadannu	Won
1997	Best Actress (Malayalam)	Aaram Thampuran & Krishnagudiyil Oru Pranayakalathu	Won

== South Indian International Movie Awards ==
Year	Category	Film	Result	Ref.
2014	Best Actress (Malayalam)	How Old Are You	Won	
2016	Best Actress (Malayalam)	Vettah	Nominated	
2017	Best Actress (Malayalam)	Udaharanam Sujatha	Nominated	
2019	Best Actress (Malayalam)	Lucifer & Prathi Poovankozhi	Won	
2019	Best Actress (Tamil)	Asuran	Nominated	
2019	Best Actress – Critics (Tamil)	Asuran	Won	

== Asianet Film Awards ==
Year	Category	Film	Result	Ref.
1998	Best Actress	Kanmadam	Won	
1999	Best Actress	Kannezhuthi Pottum Thottu and Pathram	Won	
2014	Best Actress	How Old Are You?	Won	
2015	Best Actress	Rani Padmini and Ennum Eppozhum	Nominated	
2016	Best Actress	Vettah	Won	
2017	Best Actress	Udaharanam Sujatha and C/O Saira Banu	Nominated	
2018	Best Actress	Aami and Odiyan	Won	
2019	Best Actress	Prathi Poovankozhi	Nominated	
2019	Most Popular Tamil Actress	Asuran	Won	

== Vanitha Film Awards ==
Year	Category	Film	Result	Ref.
2015	Best Actress	How Old Are You?	Won	
2017	Best Actress	Karinkunnam 6's	Won	
2018	Best Actress	Udaharanam Sujatha	Won	
2019	Best Actress	Aami & Odiyan	Won	
2020	Best Actress	Prathi Poovankozhi & Lucifer	Won	

== Asiavision Awards ==
Year	Category	Film	Result	Ref.
2014	Best Actress	How Old Are You?	Won	
2015	Best Actress	Rani Padmini	Nominated	
2016	Best Actress	Vettah & Karinkunnam 6's	Won	
2017	Best Actress	Udaharanam Sujatha	Won	
2018	Best Actress	Aami	Won	

== IIFA Utsavam ==
Year	Category	Film	Result
2015	Best Actress	Ennum Eppozhum	Nominated
2016	Best Actress	Vettah	Nominated

== North American Film Awards ==
Year	Category	Film	Result	Ref.
2017	Best Actress	Vettah & Karinkunnam 6's	Won	
2018	Best Actress	Udaharanam Sujatha	Won	

== Other awards ==
Year	Award	Category	Film	Result	Ref.
1996	Film Fans Awards	Best Actress	Thooval Kottaram	Won	
2014	Mangalam Film Awards	Best Actress	How Old Are You?	Won	
2014	Kerala Sangeetha Nataka Akademi Award	Kuchipudi	—N/a	Won	
2014	Manorama Awards	Newsmaker of the Year	—N/a	Won	
2016	Janmabhumi Awards	Best Actress	Vettah	Won	
2017	Anand TV Awards	Best Actress	Vettah & Karinkunnam 6's	Won	
2017	Movie Street Film Excellence Awards	Best Actress	Udaharanam Sujatha & C/O Saira Banu	Won	
2017	Asianet Comedy Awards	Best Actress	Udaharanam Sujatha & C/O Saira Banu	Nominated	
2018	Flowers Indian Film Awards	Best Actress	Aami & Udaharanam Sujatha	Won	
2019	Nana Film Awards	Best Actress	Aami	Won	
2019	Behindwoods Gold Medals	Best Actress	Lucifer & Prathi Poovankozhi	Won	
2019	Behindwoods Gold Medals	Best Actress - Special Mention	Asuran	Won	
2020	JFW Movie Awards	Best Actress	Asuran	Won	
2022	Mazhavil Entertainment Awards	Best Entertainer Actress	Prathi Poovankozhi	Won	
