= Filmfare Award for Best Actress – Malayalam =

Indian annual film award

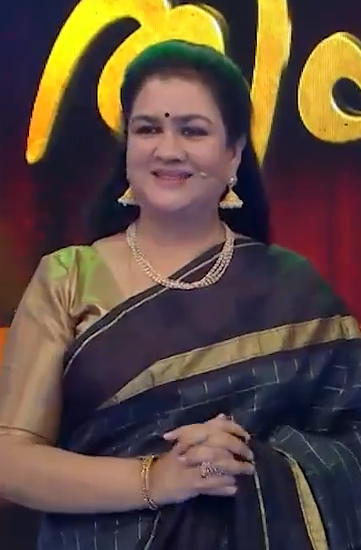
- The 2024 recipient: Urvashi
- Awarded for: Best Performance by an Actress in a Leading Role in Malayalam films
- Country: India
- Presented by: Filmfare
- First award: Roja Ramani for Chembarathy (1972)
- Currently held by: Urvashi for Ullozhukku (2024)
- Website: http://filmfareawards.indiatimes.com/

The Filmfare Award for Best Actress – Malayalam is given by the Filmfare magazine as part of its annual Filmfare Awards South for Malayalam films. The awards were extended to "Best Actress" in 1972.

== Superlatives ==
Superlative	Actor	Record
Actress with most awards	Manju Warrier	6
Actress with most nominations	Shobana	14
Oldest Nominee	Revathi	57
Oldest Winner	Urvashi	54
Youngest Winner	Roja Ramani	14
Youngest Nominee	Roja Ramani	14
Most nominations without a win	Aishwarya Lekshmi, Nazriya Nazim	3

== Multiple winners and nominations ==
Actor	wins	Most nominations
Shobana	14	2
Urvashi	01	12
Manju Warrier	6	10

== Winners ==
Here is the list of the award winners and the roles and films they won for. The year indicates the year the film was released.

Year	Actress	Role	Film	Ref
1972	Roja Ramani	Santha	Chembarathy	
1973	Nanditha Bose	Gowri	Swapnam	
1974	Lakshmi	Julie	Chattakari	
1975	Lakshmi	Pavizham	Chalanum	
1976	Lakshmi	Mohini	Mohiniyaattam	
1977	Sheela	Lakshmi	Lakshmi	
1978	Jayabharathi	Aswathi	Vadakakkoru Hridhyam	
1979	Srividya	Rohini	Edavazhiyile Poocha Minda Poocha	
1980	Srividya	Sreelatha	Puzha	
1981	Jalaja	Remani	Venal	
1982	Poornima Jayaram	Radha Ravi Chattan	Olangal	
1983	Seema	Neeli	Aaroodam	
1984	Seema	Devyani	Adiyozhukkukal	
1985	Nadhiya	Girly Mathew	Nokkethadhoorathu Kannum Nattu	
1986	Shari	Sofia	Namukku Parkkan Munthiri Thoppukal	
1987	Sharada	Saraswathi Amma	Oru Minnaminunginte Nurunguvettam	
1988	Revathi	Kakkothi	Kakkothikkavile Appooppan Thaadikal	
1989	Rekha	Annie	Dasharatham	
1990	Shobana	Maya / Gowri	Innale	
1991	Amala	Reshma	Ulladakkam	
1992	Geetha	Sethulekshmi	Aadhaaram	
1993	Madhavi	Annie	Akashadoothu	
1994	Shobhana	Karthumbi	Thenmavin Kombath	
1995	Annie	Shruthi	Mazhayethum Munpe	
1996	Manju Warrier	Anjali	Ee Puzhayum Kadannu	
1997	Manju Warrier	Unnimaya; Thamara	Aaraam Thampuran; Kaliyattam	
1998	Manju Warrier	Bhanumathi	Kanmadam	
1999	Manju Warrier	Devika Shekar	Pathram	
2000	Samyuktha Varma	Bhadra	Mazha	
2001	Samyuktha Varma	Nanditha	Meghamalhar	
2002	Navya Nair	Balamani	Nandanam	
2003	Meera Jasmine	Priyamvada	Kasthoorimann	
2004	Geethu Mohandas	Rose	Akale	
2005	Meera Jasmine	Aswathi	Achuvinte Amma	
2006	Padmapriya	Poompodi	Karutha Pakshikal	
2007	Meera Jasmine	Deepthi	Ore Kadal	
2008	Priyamani	Malavika	Thirakkatha	
2009	Shwetha Menon	Cheeru	Paleri Manikyam	
2010	Mamta Mohandas	Vidyalakshmi	Katha Thudarunnu	
2011	Kavya Madhavan	Aswathi	Gaddama	
2012	Rima Kallingal	Tessa K. Abraham	22 Female Kottayam	
2013	Ann Augustine	Gayathri	Artist	
2014	Manju Warrier	Nirupama Rajeev	How Old Are You?	
2015	Parvathy Thiruvothu	Kottathil Kanchanamala	Ennu Ninte Moideen	
2016	Nayanthara	Vasuki Iyer	Puthiya Niyamam	
2017	Parvathy Thiruvothu	Sameera	Take Off	
2018	Manju Warrier	Kamala Surayya	Aami	
2019	AWARDS FUNCTION WAS SUSPENDED DUE TO COVID-19 PANDEMIC			
2020–2021	Nimisha Sajayan	Unnamed Wife	The Great Indian Kitchen	
2022	Darshana Rajendran	Jaya	Jaya Jaya Jaya Jaya Hey	
2023	Vincy Aloshious	Rekha	Rekha	
2024	Urvashi	Leelamma	Ullozhukku	

== Nominations ==
Year	Actress	Role	Film	Ref.
2008	Priyamani	Malavika	Thirakkatha	
2008	Gopika	Bindu	Veruthe Oru Bharya	
2008	Meera Jasmine	Krishna Priya	Calcutta News	
2008	Meera Nandan	Lachi	Mulla	
2008	Padmapriya Janakiraman	Anu Sachidanandan	Panchamara Thanalil	
2009	Swetha Menon	Cheeru	Paleri Manikyam	
2009	Gopika	Vimala	Swantham Lekhakan	
2009	Jyothika	Nimisha	Seethakalyanam	
2009	Kanika	Daisy	Bhagyadevatha	
2009	Priyanka Nair	Zahira	Vilapangalkkappuram	
2010	Mamta Mohandas	Vidhyalakshmi	Kadha Thudarunnu	
2010	Archana Jose Kavi	Jewel	Mummy & Me	
2010	Kavya Madhavan	Annie	Paappi Appacha	
2010	Priyamani	Padmashree	Pranchiyettan & the Saint	
2010	Samvrutha Sunil	Parvathy	Cocktail	
2011	Kavya Madhavan	Ashwathi	Khaddama	
2011	Jaya Prada	Grace	Pranayam	
2011	Rima Kallingal	Surya Prabha	City of God	
2011	Samvrutha Sunil	Reshmi	Swapna Sanchari	
2011	Shwetha Menon	Maya Krishnan	Salt N' Pepper	
2012	Rima Kallingal	Tessa K. Abraham	22 Female Kottayam	
2012	Kavya Madhavan	Vanaja	Bavuttiyude Namathil	
2012	Mamta Mohandas	Anuradha	Arike	
2012	Revathi	Molly Aunty	Molly Aunty Rocks!	
2012	Shweta Menon	Kali Pillai	Ozhimuri	
2013	Ann Augustine	Gayathri	Artist	
2013	Mamta Mohandas	Janet	Celluloid	
2013	Meena	Rani George	Drishyam	
2013	Shobhana	Dr. Rohini Pranab	Thira	
2013	Shweta Menon	Meera	Kalimannu	
2014	Manju Warrier	Nirupama Rajeev	How Old Are You?	
2014	Anusree	Janaki	Ithihasa	
2014	Aparna Gopinath	Anjali Arakkal	Munnariyippu	
2014	Asha Sarath	Nandini	Varsham	
2014	Nazriya Nazim	Pooja Mathew	Om Shanti Oshana	
2015	Parvathy	Kanchanamala	Ennu Ninte Moideen	
2015	Amala Paul	Mili	Mili	
2015	Anusree	Sushama	Chandrettan Evideya	
2015	Mamta Mohandas	Laya Cherian	Two Countries	
2015	Manju Warrier	Padmini	Rani Padmini	
2016	Nayanthara	Vasuki Iyer	Puthiya Niyamam	
2016	Manju Warrier	Vandhana	Karinkunnam 6'S	
2016	Rajisha Vijayan	Elizabeth	Anuraga Karikkin Vellam	
2016	Sai Pallavi	Anjali Siddarth	Kali	
2016	Shruthy Menon	Anita	Kismath	
2017	Parvathy	Sameera	Take Off	
2017	Aishwarya Lekshmi	Aparna Ravi	Mayanadhi	
2017	Anu Sithara	Malini	Ramante Edanthottam	
2017	Manju Warrier	Sujatha Krishnan	Udaharanam Sujatha	
2017	Nimisha Sajayan	Sreeja	Thondimuthalum Driksakshiyum	
2018	Manju Warrier	Kamala Surayya	Aami	
2018	Aishwarya Lekshmi	Priya Paul	Varathan	
2018	Anu Sithara	Anitha Sathyan	Captain	
2018	Nazriya Nazim	Jennifer Maria Thomas	Koode	
2018	Nimisha Sajayan	Aishwarya Gopal	Eeda	
2020–2021	Nimisha Sajayan	The Wife	The Great Indian Kitchen	
2020–2021	Anna Ben	Jessy	Kappela	
2020–2021	Darshana Rajendran	Anumol	C U Soon	
2020–2021	Grace Antony	Suhara	Halal Love Story	
2020–2021	Kani Kusruti	Khadeeja	Biriyaani	
2020–2021	Rima Kallingal	Mariya	Santhoshathinte Onnam Rahasyam	
2020–2021	Shobhana	Neena	Varane Avashyamund	
2022	Darshana Rajendran	Jaya	Jaya Jaya Jaya Jaya Hey	
2022	Aiswarya Lekshmi	Kumari	Kumari	
2022	Devi Varma	Ayisha Rawther	Saudi Vellakka	
2022	Navya Nair	C L Radhamani	Oruthee	
2022	Nithya Menen	Penkutty	19(1)(a)	
2022	Revathi	Asha	Bhoothakalam	
2023	Vincy Aloshious	Rekha Rajendran	Rekha	
2023	Anjana Jayaprakash	Hamsadhwani	Pachuvum Athbutha Vilakkum	
2023	Jyothika	Omana Philip Mathew	Kaathal – The Core	
2023	Kalyani Priyadarshan	Fathima Noorjahan	Sesham Mike-il Fathima	
2023	Lena	Tamara	Article 21	
2023	Manju Warrier	Nilambur Ayisha	Ayisha	
2023	Navya Nair	Janaki	Janaki Jaane	
2024	Urvashi	Leelamma	Ullozhukku	
2024	Divya Prabha	Anu	Prabhayay Ninachathellam	
2024	Kani Kusruti	Prabha	Prabhayay Ninachathellam	
2024	Mamitha Baiju	Reenu Roy	Premalu	
2024	Nazriya Nazim	Priyadarshini Antony	Sookshmadarshini	
2024	Parvathy Thiruvothu	Anju	Ullozhukku	
2024	Zarin Shihab	Anjali	Aattam	
