= List of awards and nominations received by Vidyasagar =

List of awards and nominations by Vidyasagar
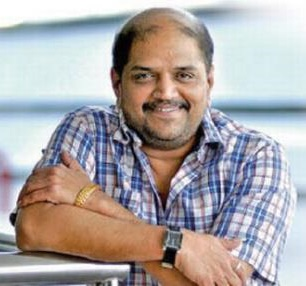
Awards & nominations
Award	Won	Nominated
Asianet Film Awards	3	7
Asiavision Awards	3	2
Filmfare Awards South	5	5
Ghantasala Puraskar Award	1	0
Kalaimamani Awards	1	0
Kerala State Film Award	3	10
Kerala Film Critics Awards	11	6
Mathrubhumi Film Awards	1	0
Mirchi Music Awards	3	0
Nandi Awards	1	0
National Film Awards	1	4
Tamil Nadu State Film Awards	2	6
Vanitha Film Awards	1	0
Volga Film Festival Award	1	0
- Total number of wins and nominations
Totals	43	48

This is a list of awards and nominations received by Vidyasagar, an Indian composer, musician and singer who predominantly works in Tamil, Malayalam, Telugu and Hindi film industries.

== Honorary ==
=== Government ===
Year	Award	Honouring body	Notes
2006	Kalaimamani Award	Government of Tamil Nadu	Awarded for contributions to music

=== Other ===
Year	Award	Honouring body	Notes
2010	Ghantasala Puraskar Award	Sharan Incorporation	Awarded for contributions to music
2016	Swaralaya Kairali Yesudas Award	Kairali TV	Awarded for best contributions in Malayalam Cinema

== Film awards and nominations ==
=== Asianet Film Awards ===
Year	Film	Category	Result
1998	Pranayavarnangal	Best Music Direction	Won
2000	Chandranudikkunna Dikhil	Best Music Direction	Won
2008	Mulla	Best Music Direction	Won
2002	Meesa Madhavan	Best Music Direction	Nominated
2005	Chanthupottu	Best Music Direction	Nominated
2007	Rock n' Roll	Best Music Direction	Nominated
2009	Neelathamara	Best Music Direction	Nominated
2012	Diamond Necklace	Best Music Direction	Nominated
2013	Oru Indian Pranayakadha	Best Music Direction	Nominated
2015	Anarkali	Best Music Direction	Nominated

=== Asiavision Awards ===
Year	Film	Category	Result
2008	Mulla	Best Music Direction	Won
2009	Neelathamara	Best Music Direction	Won
2012	Diamond Necklace	Best Music Direction	Won
2013	Oru Indian Pranayakadha	Best Music Direction	Nominated
2015	Ennum Eppozhum	Best Music Direction	Nominated

=== Filmfare Awards South ===
Year	Film	Category	Result
1998	Summer in Bethlehem	Best Music Direction	Won
1999	Niram	Best Music Direction	Won
2002	Meesa Madhavan	Best Music Direction	Won
2009	Neelathamara	Best Music Direction	Won
2012	Diamond Necklace	Best Music Direction	Won
1996	Azhakiya Ravanan	Best Music Direction	Nominated
1997	Krishnagudiyil Oru Pranayakalathu	Best Music Direction	Nominated
2003	Dhool	Best Music Direction	Nominated
2008	Mulla	Best Music Direction	Nominated
2009	Kanden Kadhalai	Best Music Direction	Nominated

=== Kerala State Film Awards ===
Year	Film	Category	Result
1996	Azhakiya Ravanan	Best Music Direction	Won
1998	Pranayavarnangal	Best Music Direction	Won
2000	Devadoothan	Best Music Direction	Won

=== Kerala Film Critics Association Awards ===
Year	Film	Category	Result
1996	Azhakiya Ravanan	Best Music Direction	Won
1997	Krishnagudiyil Oru Pranayakalathu	Best Music Direction	Won
1998	Pranayavarnangal	Best Music Direction	Won
1999	Niram & Chandranudikkunna Dikhil	Best Music Direction	Won
2000	Devadoothan	Best Music Direction	Won
2002	Meesa Madhavan	Best Music Direction	Won
2005	Chanthupottu	Best Music Direction	Won
2007	Rock n' Roll	Best Music Direction	Won
2008	Mulla	Best Music Direction	Won
2009	Neelathamara	Best Music Direction	Won
2012	Diamond Necklace	Best Music Direction	Won
2001	Dhosth & Randaam Bhavam	Best Music Direction	Nominated
2003	Kilichundan Mampazham	Best Music Direction	Nominated
2005	Kochi Rajavu	Best Music Direction	Nominated
2007	Goal	Best Music Direction	Nominated
2013	Oru Indian Pranayakadha	Best Music Direction	Nominated
2015	Ennum Eppozhum	Best Music Direction	Nominated

=== Mirchi Music Awards ===
Year	Film	Category	Result
2009	Neelathamara	Mirchi Listener's Choice; Song of the Year - Anuraga Vilochananayi	Won
2012	Diamond Necklace	Best Music Direction	Won
2012	Diamond Necklace	Song of the Year - Nilamalare	Won

=== National Film Awards ===
Year	Film	Category	Result
2004	Swarabhishekam	Best Music Direction	Won

=== Tamil Nadu State Film Awards ===
Year	Film	Category	Result
2007	Mozhi	Best Music Direction	Won
2001	Dhill, Thavasi, Poovellam Un Vasam	Best Music Direction	Won
2002	Run	Best Music Direction	Nominated
2003	Dhool	Best Music Direction	Nominated
2004	Ghilli	Best Music Direction	Nominated
2007	Periyar	Best Music Direction	Nominated
2009	Kanden Kadhalai	Best Music Direction	Nominated
2011	Kaavalan	Best Music Direction	Nominated

=== Other Awards ===
- Nandi Awards
  - 2004 – Best Music Direction – Swarabhishekam
- Volga River Side Film Festival Award
  - 2007 – Best Music Direction – Periyar
- Vanitha Film Awards
  - 2008 – Best Music Direction – Mulla
- Mathrubhumi Film Awards
  - 2009 – Best Music Direction – Neelathamara
- Kerala Film Producers Association Awards
  - 2014 – Best Music Director – Geethaanjali

=== Nominations ===
- Vijay Awards
  - 2007 – Best Music Direction – Mozhi
- SIIMA Awards
  - 2012 – Best Music Direction – Diamond Necklace
