= Lady Superstar =

Lady Superstar is the nickname of various woman celebrities in Indian cinema, including:

- Vijayashanti, Indian actress and politician
- Manju Warrier, Indian actress, dancer and singer
- Anushka Shetty, Indian actress
- Nayanthara, Indian actress
