= International Women's Trade Centre =

International Women's Trade Centre (iWTC) is an initiative of the Kerala Gender Park's "Vision 2020", running under the State's Department of Social Justice, designed to help women entrepreneurs by providing a safe space away from home to set up or expand their businesses and market their products abroad.

It also has a dedicated space to promote performing arts and cultural forms like dance, music and theatre for women.

Currently Kerala is setting-up its first centre in Kozhikode. The initiative is in its first phase, and is based on the United Nations' Sustainable Development Goals (SDGs) with the principle of "leaving no one behind".

The centre is housed in environmentally-friendly and resource-efficient buildings. A crèche and daycare centre is available for children, adults and the elderly, to help the businesswomen to focus on their work.

== See also ==
- She Taxi
