= Santhosh Keezhattoor =

Indian actor

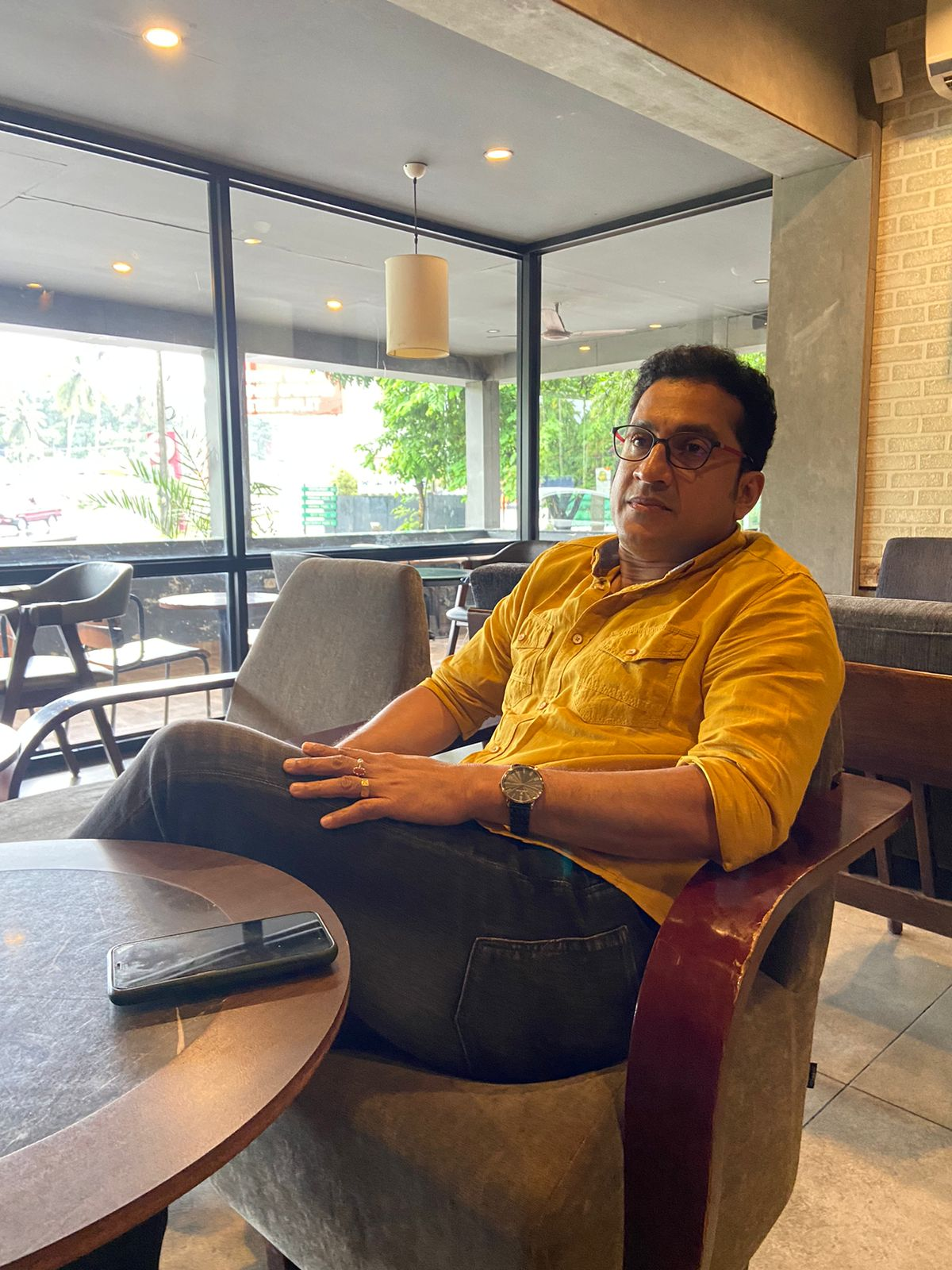
- Born: Taliparamba, Kerala, India
- Occupations: Actor; theatre artist
- Years active: 1992–present
- Spouse: Sini Santhosh
- Children: Yadusanth
- Parents: P. Damodaran (father); K. Karthyani (mother)

Santhosh Keezhattoor is an Indian actor known for his work in Malayalam films and television. Before working in films, he worked as a theatre artist and programme producer.

== Personal life ==
Santhosh hails from Taliparamba, Kerala, India. At the age of 16, he joined Kannur's professional theatre group Sangatha Chethana. He won acclaim for a solo drama that narrated the life of Ochira Velukkutty. He also performed in a theatre performance called Pen Nadam which was critical acclaimed.

== Filmography ==
Key
| † | Denotes films that have not yet been released |

=== Films ===
- All films are in Malayalam language unless otherwise noted.

| Year | Title | Role | Notes |
|---|---|---|---|
| 2003 | Chakram | Satheeshan | |
| 2014 | Varsham | Satheesan | |
| 2014 | Vikramadithyan | Kunjunni Menon | |
| 2015 | Ivan Maryadaraman | Kunjunni Menon | |
| 2015 | Aana Mayil Ottakam | Puthkottayil Veerabhadran | |
| 2015 | Kanal | Anandan's Friend | |
| 2015 | Saigal Padukayanu | | |
| 2015 | Ennum Eppozhum | Taxi driver | |
| 2015 | Onnam Loka Mahayudham | | |
| 2015 | Mariyam Mukku | Bernard | |
| 2015 | Oru Vadakkan Selfie | Mohan | |
| 2015 | KL.10 | Ali Sir | |
| 2015 | Urumbukal Urangarilla | Davis | |
| 2015 | Loham | Sudheer | |
| 2015 | Pathemari | Majeed | |
| 2015 | Jamna Pyari | | |
| 2015 | Aana Mayil Ottakam | | |
| 2016 | Pulimurugan | Murugan's father | |
| 2016 | Marupadi | | |
| 2016 | Swarna Kaduva | Surendran | |
| 2016 | Ottakolam | | |
| 2016 | Karinkunnam 6's | Vasudev | |
| 2016 | Mudhugauv | Chandran, Bharath's father | |
| 2016 | Mohavalayam | | |
| 2016 | Vettah | Security Guard | |
| 2016 | Style | | |
| 2017 | Samarpanam | Chandrkanth | |
| 2017 | The Great Father | James a.k.a. Joker | |
| 2017 | Sakhavu | Senthil | |
| 2017 | Viswasapoorvam Mansoor | | |
| 2017 | Kharam | Murali | |
| 2017 | Nilavariyathei | | |
| 2017 | Paathi: the Half | Pavithran | |
| 2017 | Pretham Undu Sookshikkuka | | |
| 2017 | Gemini | Mohana Varma | |
| 2018 | Aami | Mohanan | |
| 2018 | Kammara Sambhavam | Vishwambaran Nambiar | |
| 2018 | Koode | Darius | |
| 2018 | Ranam | Aadhi's father | |
| 2018 | Kala Viplavam Pranayam | Comrade Ravi | |
| 2018 | Odiyan | Vasudevan | |
| 2018 | Thanaha | Prabhakaran | |
| 2018 | Aickarakkonathe Bhishaguaranmaar | Sathish | |
| 2018 | Oru Pazhaya Bomb Kadha | Comrade | |
| 2018 | Mazhayathu | Sathyan | |
| 2018 | Aravindante Athidhikal | Raghavan | |
| 2018 | Kala Viplavam Pranayam | Ravi | |
| 2018 | Bonsai | | |
| 2018 | Captain | Sathyan's elder brother | |
| 2018 | Kadha Paranja Kadha | | |
| 2018 | Queen | Bride's father | |
| 2019 | Soothrakkaran | Balachandran | |
| 2019 | Madhura Raja | Police Constable Poulo | |
| 2019 | Edakkad Battalion 06 | Ummer | |
| 2019 | Fancy Dress | Martin | |
| 2019 | A for Apple | SI Jayasankar | |
| 2019 | And the Oscar Goes To... | Basheer | |
| 2019 | Kuttymama | Bank Manager Koshi | |
| 2019 | Theerumanam | Adv. K. R. Ishwar | |
| 2019 | Odunnon | Pappan | |
| 2019 | Moppala | Ambhu Panikkar | |
| 2020 | 2 States | Advocate | |
| 2020 | Bhoomiyile Manohara Swakaryam | Fr. Dominic | |
| 2020 | Thakkol Pazhuthu | Gireesh | |
| 2020 | Maniyarayile Ashokan | Shyama's father | |
| 2020 | Shyamaragam | Krishnamoorthy Senior | |
| 2021 | Vellam | Rajan | |
| 2021 | Vishudha Rathirkal | Police Inspector | |
| 2021 | Kaaval | Thomas | |
| 2021 | Marakkar: Lion of the Arabian Sea | Kokkattu Panicker | |
| 2022 | Kallan D'Souza | CPO Jayakrishnan | |
| 2022 | Aaraattu | SP Ramdas IPS | |
| 2022 | Pada | N. P. Ravichandran IAS | |
| 2022 | Night Drive | Pappan | |
| 2022 | CBI 5: The Brain | DySP Baburaj | |
| 2022 | Ullasam | Ajayan | |
| 2022 | Marakkar: Arabikadalinte Simham | Kokkattu Panicker | |
| 2023 | Divorce | Vinu | |
| 2023 | 90:00 Minutes | Advocate Sandeep Kumar | |
| 2023 | Within Seconds | Njeezhur Vakeel | |
| 2023 | Neeraja | Neeraja’s boss | |
| 2023 | Por Thozhil | John Sebastian | Tamil film |
| 2023 | Theeppori Benny | Maramattam Varkey | |
| 2023 | Garudan | SI Varghese Cherian | |
| 2024 | Palayam PC | | |
| 2024 | Thankamani | SI Nithin Panicker | |
| 2024 | Ajayante Randam Moshanam | Paramu Nambiar | |
| 2024 | Cup | Sub Inspector | |
| 2025 | 1098 Ten, Nine, Eight: A Countdown to Infinity | | |
| 2026 | Juniors Journey | | |
| 2026 | Bhishmar | | |
| 2026 | Derby | | |

=== Television ===
| Year | Title | Role | Channel |
|---|---|---|---|
| 2010-2012 | Devimahathmyam | Lord Shiva | Asianet |
| 2016 | Jagratha | Niranjan | Amrita TV |
| 2016 | Jagratha | C.I. Tom Jose | Amrita TV |
| 2021 | Ente Maathavu | Devaraj | Surya TV |
| 2021 | Swantham Sujatha | Adv. Swaminathan | Surya TV |
| 2023 | Geetha Govindam | Arakkal Madhavan | Asianet |
| 2023 | Madhanakamarajan | Mahendra Maharaja | YouTube |

=== Short films ===
| Year | Title | Notes |
|---|---|---|
| 2021 | Mridu Bhavye Drida Krithye | |
| 2021 | COVID -19 STIGMA | |
| 2021 | Who is Right | |
| 2021 | Hot Date | |
| 2021 | Karimeen | |
| 2021 | Black Label | |
| 2021 | The Rain Tree | |
| 2021 | The Return | |
| 2021 | Sneez | |
