= Manju Warrier =

Indian actress

- Manju Warrier at an event
- Born: 10 September 1978 (age 48) or 10 September 1979 (age 47); Nagercoil, Tamil Nadu, India
- Occupation: Actress
- Years active: 1995–1999; 2014–present
- Spouse: Dileep (m. 1998; div. 2015)
- Children: 1
- Relatives: Madhu Wariar (brother)
- Awards: Full list

Manju Warrier (ʋaːɾjər; born 10 September 1978/1979) is an Indian actress, dancer and producer who works predominantly in Malayalam and Tamil cinema. She is the recipient of a National Film Award, a Kerala State Film Award, a Tamil Nadu State Film Award and seven Filmfare Awards South. She received the Kerala Sangeetha Nataka Akademi Award in 2014 and was the first person to receive the award for Kuchipudi.

Warrier made her acting debut with Sakshyam (1995). Her most notable films include Thooval Kottaram (1996), Sallapam (1996), Ee Puzhayum Kadannu (1996), Aaraam Thampuran (1997) and Summer in Bethlehem (1998). Post her marriage in 1998, she took a break from acting. Warrier returned to cinema with the acclaimed film How Old Are You? (2014).

== Early life ==
Manju Warrier was born on 10 September 1978/1979 at Nagercoil in the Kanyakumari district of Tamil Nadu in a Malayali family. Her family is originally from Pullu village in the Thrissur district of Kerala.

Warrier's father, T. V. Madhavan, worked as an accountant at Shakthi Finance's Nagercoil regional office, and her mother, Girija (from Thiruvilwamala), was a housewife. She has an elder brother, Madhu Wariar, who is also an actor and producer.

Warrier studied at C.S.I. Matriculation School in Nagercoil. After her father was promoted, they returned to Kerala and settled in the Kannur district. She then studied at Chinmaya Vidyalaya and at Chovva Higher Secondary School in Kannur.

== Career ==
=== Early work, breakthrough and success (1995–1999) ===
Manju first appeared in a television serial Moharavam which was telecast on Doordarshan.

At the age of 17, she debuted in the film Sakshyam (1995). A year later, she acted in the movie Sallapam (1996), co-starring Dileep, whom she later married.

Though her first stint in the industry was only for 3 years, Manju featured in 20 Malayalam films that won her numerous accolades from audiences and critics alike. Her performance in the film Kannezhuthi Pottum Thottu (1999) won a special mention from the jury for the National Film Awards. Her other note-worthy films during these years include: Aaraam Thampuran (1997) and Kanmadam (1998) with Mohanlal, Ee Puzhayum Kadannu and Kudamattam with her now ex-husband Dileep, Kaliyattam (1997), Summer in Bethlehem (1998), Pranayavarnangal (1998) and Pathram (1999) with Suresh Gopi, and Dilliwala Rajakumaran (1996), Kaliveedu (1996), Thooval Kottaram (1996), Irattakuttikalude Achan (1997) and Krishnagudiyil Oru Pranayakalathu (1997) with Jayaram. In 1998, Manju was the lead in the M T Vasudevan Nair film, Daya that went onto win several awards.

She won the Kerala State Film Award for Best Actress for her performance in the film Ee Puzhayum Kadannu (1996). Manju won four consecutive Filmfare Award for Best Actress for Ee Puzhayum Kadannu in 1996, Aaram Thampuran and Kaliyattam in 1997, Kanmadam in 1998 and Pathram in 1999.

Most of her movies were commercially successful as well, with Aaram Thampuran and Pathram being the highest grossing Malayalam films in the years 1997 and 1999 respectively. Her last film before she took a sabbatical from films was Kannezhuthi Pottum Thottu.

=== Return to films (2012–2014) ===
Manju took a hiatus from films after marriage to Dileep and on 24 October 2012, Manju returned to the stage to perform a Kuchipudi dance recital at the Navaratri Nritha Mandapam in the Guruvayur Sree Krishna Temple, in front of hundreds of spectators.

Later in July 2013, she acted in a commercial for Kalyan Jewellers with Amitabh Bachchan. She also acted alongside Nagarjuna Akkineni, Prabhu Ganesan and Shiva Rajkumar in Telugu, Tamil and Kannada versions of the same ad-film. She continued to appear in many advertisements and stage performances. The same year she published a book titled Sallapam that was "a series of memoirs of her life".

She made her much awaited comeback to movies after 15 years in 2014 with Rosshan Andrrews's How Old Are You?.

=== Career expansion (2015–present) ===
Manju's next film was Sathyan Anthikad's Ennum Eppozhum which reunited her with Mohanlal after a gap of 17 years. Her next project was Rani Padmini by Aashiq Abu along with Rima Kallingal, released in October 2015. Despite not faring well at the box office, it has been considered an 'underrated gem' of a movie that celebrates female friendships. She appeared as an animator in Jo and the Boy, her last release of the year.

In 2016, she had Rajesh Pillai's Vettah, Karinkunnam 6's and Shakuntala, a Drama In 2017, Warrier had C/O Saira Banu, Villain, and Udaharanam Sujatha.

In 2018, Manju appeared in the lead role in the Kamala Surayya biopic Aami. Her next film for release was the musical-romantic-comedy drama Mohanlal, in which she played a die-hard fan of Mohanlal. Though the movie received mixed responses, the actress was appreciated for her comic timing and for understanding how a 'crazy fan lives and breathes.' Her final release of the year was the much-hyped fantasy drama Odiyan, which has the highest opening day collection for a film at the Kerala box office and for a Malayalam film at the worldwide box office. The movie opened to mixed reviews, but Warrier was praised for being uniformly good as the lonesome Prabha 'who has always known that her fate was written the moment she was born into a particular social class and often summons up the spirit to defy that written word.' Her first release in 2019 was Lucifer directed by Prithviraj Sukumaran. Manjusha Radhakrisnan wrote in her review, "To watch top Malayali talent Manju Warrier as a grieving daughter of a political leader, who dies suddenly, leaving a political vacuum in her family and her political outfit, is pure gold. Warrier as a troubled mother and wife Priyadarshani — who unearths a string of dark secrets within her family circles — is heartbreaking. In limited screen-time, she comes across as a paragon of vulnerability and strength — an indication to the strength of her acting prowess." Lucifer went on to become the first Malayalam film to earn more than ₹200 crore, and is currently the third highest-grossing Malayalam film. In the same year, she made her Tamil debut with Vetrimaaran's Asuran opposite Dhanush. Sreedhar Pillai called her performance 'intense' in his review for Firstpost. "Manju, as Dhanush's wife, makes a sensational debut in Tamil. You can feel her anger and the wetness in her tears." Her final release of the year saw her collaborating with her comeback director Rosshan Andrrews for the revenge thriller Prathi Poovankozhi. Critics unanimously praised her arresting screen presence and acting. In his review for Film Companion, Vishal Menon noted, "..if anyone thought Manju Warrier hasn't had too many great performance in her second coming, show them Prathi Poovankozhi along with Asuran, to remind them that no one can play anger like she can." For her portrayals of bold, brave women on screen who defy the notions of what roles women can play, Manju Warrier was named a 'disruptor' by Film Companion.

In March 2021, Warrier began filming for Amriki Pandit, her Hindi debut opposite R. Madhavan. In 2021, she acted with Mammootty for the movie The Priest. In 2022, Manju reunited with Biju Menon through Lalitham Sundaram after a gap of 20 years.

== Personal life ==
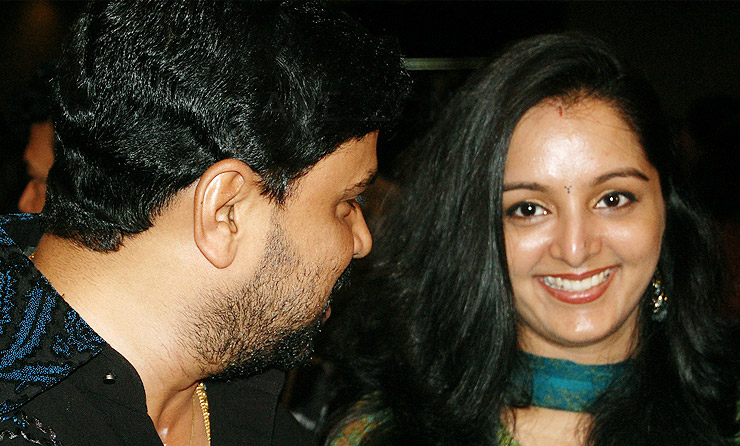
Manju Warrier with her then spouse, Dileep, attending a function in 2010

On 20 October 1998, Manju married actor Dileep at the Aluva Sri Krishna Temple. The former couple has a daughter, Meenakshi. They filed for divorce in 2014, and it was granted by the Ernakulam Family Court in January 2015.

Manju now lives at Pullu, Thrissur.

== In the media ==
Manju's characters appear on many lists featuring strong women characters in Indian Cinema. She is considered one of the highest paid Malayalam actresses.

She is also a professional Kuchipudi dancer, having learnt the art from Geetha Padmakumar. She actively performs in many classical dance programs and plays. Her return to stage was at Guruvayur in 2012 as part of the Navaratri dance festival. She received the Kerala Sangeetha Nataka Akademi Award in 2014 and was the first person to receive the award for Kuchipudi.

Apart from films, she is a brand ambassador of Kalyan Jewellers, Sony India, Lasagu Coaching App, MyG, Ujala Detergent, Kitchen Treasures, Ajinorah and KLM Axiva. She has also appeared in commercials for Lifebuoy, Meriiboy Icecreams, Dhathri etc. She also became the first ever brand ambassador of a Malayalam Entertainment channel, through Zee Keralam.

She is also the goodwill ambassador and face of various government and social causes like State Literacy Mission, She Taxi, Kudumbashree's organic farming project (inspired by her role in How Old Are You), Horticorp and Naipunnya Development projects.

== Filmography ==
=== As actress ===
Key
| † | Denotes films that have not yet been released |

List of Manju Warrier film credits
| Year | Title | Role | Language | Notes | Ref. |
|---|---|---|---|---|---|
| 1995 | Sakshyam | Smitha | Malayalam | Debut film | |
| 1996 | Sallapam | Radha | Malayalam | | |
| 1996 | Thooval Kottaram | Devaprabha Varma | Malayalam | | |
| 1996 | Dilliwala Rajakumaran | Maya | Malayalam | | |
| 1996 | Kaliveedu | Mridula | Malayalam | | |
| 1996 | Ee Puzhayum Kadannu | Anjali | Malayalam | | |
| 1997 | Kudamattam | Gauri | Malayalam | | |
| 1997 | Irattakuttikalude Achan | Anupama | Malayalam | | |
| 1997 | Krishnagudiyil Oru Pranayakalathu | Meenakshi | Malayalam | | |
| 1997 | Kaliyattam | Thaamara | Malayalam | | |
| 1997 | Sammanam | Rajalakshmi | Malayalam | | |
| 1997 | Aaraam Thampuran | Unnimaya | Malayalam | | |
| 1997 | Innalekalillaathe | Beena | Malayalam | | |
| 1998 | Pranayavarnangal | Aarathi Nair | Malayalam | | |
| 1998 | Daya | Daya / Sumuru / Sameer | Malayalam | | |
| 1998 | Kanmadam | Bhanumathi | Malayalam | | |
| 1998 | Summer in Bethlehem | Abhirami/Amy | Malayalam | | |
| 1998 | Thirakalkkappuram | Seetha | Malayalam | | |
| 1999 | Pathram | Devika Shekhar | Malayalam | | |
| 1999 | Kannezhuthi Pottum Thottu | Bhadra | Malayalam | | |
| 2014 | How Old Are You? | Nirupama Rajeev | Malayalam | | |
| 2015 | Ennum Eppozhum | Adv. Deepa | Malayalam | | |
| 2015 | Rani Padmini | Padmini | Malayalam | | |
| 2015 | Jo and the Boy | Jo / Joan Mary John | Malayalam | | |
| 2016 | Paavada | Babu's fiancé | Malayalam | Cameo appearance | |
| 2016 | Vettah | Commissioner Sribala IPS | Malayalam | | |
| 2016 | Karinkunnam 6's | Vandana Aby | Malayalam | | |
| 2017 | C/O Saira Banu | Saira Banu | Malayalam | | |
| 2017 | Udaharanam Sujatha | Sujatha Krishnan | Malayalam | | |
| 2017 | Villain | Dr. Neelima Mathew | Malayalam | | |
| 2018 | Aami | Kamala Surayya | Malayalam | | |
| 2018 | Mohanlal | Meenakshi / Meenukutty | Malayalam | | |
| 2018 | Odiyan | Prabha | Malayalam | | |
| 2019 | Lucifer | Priyadharshini Ramdas | Malayalam | | |
| 2019 | Asuran | Pachaiyammal Sivasaami | Tamil | Tamil Debut | |
| 2019 | Prathi Poovankozhi | Madhuri | Malayalam | | |
| 2020 | Kayattam | Maya | Malayalam | Also co-producer | |
| 2021 | The Priest | Susan | Malayalam | | |
| 2021 | Chathur Mukham | Thejaswini | Malayalam | Also producer | |
| 2021 | Marakkar: Arabikadalinte Simham | Subaida | Malayalam | | |
| 2022 | Lalitham Sundaram | Annie Mary Das | Malayalam | Also producer | |
| 2022 | Meri Awas Suno | Dr. Reshmi Padath | Malayalam | | |
| 2022 | Jack N' Jill | Parvathy | Malayalam | Partially reshot in Tamil as Centimeter | |
| 2023 | Thunivu | Kanmani | Tamil | | |
| 2023 | Ayisha | Ayisha | Malayalam; Arabic | Bilingual film | |
| 2023 | Vellari Pattanam | K.P Sunandha | Malayalam | | |
| 2024 | Footage | The mysterious woman | Malayalam | | |
| 2024 | Vettaiyan | Thara Athiyan | Tamil | | |
| 2024 | Viduthalai Part 2 | Mahalakshmi | Tamil | | |
| 2025 | L2: Empuraan | Priyadarshini Ramdas | Malayalam | | |
| 2025 | Aaro — Someone | Visitor | Malayalam | Short film | |
| 2026 | Mr. X | Indira Varma | Tamil | | |
| TBA | Nere Chovva † | TBA | Malayalam | Filming | |
| TBA | HappiLoop † | Jayashree | Malayalam | Filming | |
| TBA | Odiyan: The Age of Illusion † | TBA | Malayalam | Filming | |
| TBA | Ameriki Pandit † | Shubha | Hindi | Hindi debut; filming | |

=== As dubbing artist ===
List of Manju Warrier film dubbing credits
| Year | Title | Character | Language | Notes |
|---|---|---|---|---|
| 2016 | Girls | Narrator | Malayalam; Tamil | Bilingual Film |
| 2023 | Alone | Yamuna | Malayalam | |

== Discography ==
Discography of Manju Warrier
| Year | Song | Film/Album | Language | Co-Singers | Lyrics | Composer | Ref. |
|---|---|---|---|---|---|---|---|
| 1998 | "Vezhambal Mamazha" | Chingapoovu (album) | Malayalam | Mohanlal | Bichu Thirumala | Berny–Ignatius | |
| 1998 | "Pakal Kinakkal" | Chingapoovu (album) | Malayalam | Solo Song | Bichu Thirumala | Berny–Ignatius | |
| 1999 | "Chembazhukka" | Kannezhuthi Pottum Thottu | Malayalam | Dr. K. J. Yesudas, Kalabhavan Mani | Kavalam Narayana Panicker | M. G. Radhakrishnan | |
| 2015 | "Do Do Do" | Jo and the Boy | Malayalam | Sanoop Santhosh | Santhosh Varma | Rahul Subramanian | |
| 2016 | "Swanthana Geetham" | Kerala Can (show) Manorama News | Malayalam | Chorus | Harinarayanan | Ratheesh Vega | |
| 2022 | "Kim Kim" | Jack N' Jill | Malayalam | Solo Song | B. K. Harinarayanan | Ram Surendar | |
| 2022 | "Kim Kim" | Centimeter (D) | Tamil | Solo Song | Lalithanand | Ram Surendar | |
| 2022 | "Isthako" | Kayyattam | Malayalam | Solo Song | Ratheesh Eettillam, Devan Narayanan, Aastha Gupta, Sanal Kumar Sasindran | Ratheesh Eetillam | |
| 2023 | "Kasethan Kadavulada" (video version) | Thunivu | Tamil | Vaisagh, Ghibran | Vaisagh | Ghibran | |
