= Madhu Neelakandan =

Indian cinematographer, film producer

- Occupations: Cinematographer; film producer
- Years active: 1998–present
- Awards: Kerala State Film Award for Best Cinematography (2012, 2021)

Madhu Neelakandan ISC, sometimes spelled Madhu Neelakantan is an Indian cinematographer and film producer who works predominantly in Malayalam cinema. He won the Kerala State Film Award for Best Cinematography in 2012 for Annayum Rasoolum and in 2021 for Churuli. He is a part of Collective Phase One, a creative group that has produced films such as ID and Njan Steve Lopez. He completed his postgraduate diploma in cinematography from the Film and Television Institute of India.

== Filmography ==
List of Madhu Neelakandan film credits
Year	Title	Language	Notes
2003	Ivar	Malayalam	
2003	Saphalam	Malayalam	
2004	Vajram	Malayalam	
2009	Chal Chala Chal	Hindi	
2010	Kushti	Hindi	
2012	Masters	Malayalam	
2012	I.D.	Hindi	
2012	The Hitlist	Malayalam; Kannada	
2013	Annayum Rasoolum	Malayalam	Won—Kerala State Film Award for Best Cinematography
2013	Kadal Kadannu Oru Maathukutty	Malayalam	
2014	Drishya	Kannada	
2015	Rani Padmini	Malayalam	
2016	Kammatipaadam	Malayalam	
2017	Solo	Malayalam; Tamil	
2017	Udaharanam Sujatha	Malayalam	
2017	Ramante Edanthottam	Malayalam	
2018	Aami	Malayalam	
2020	Run Kalyani	Malayalam	
2021	Churuli	Malayalam	Won—Kerala State Film Award for Best Cinematography
2021	Sunny	Malayalam	
2023	Thuramukham	Malayalam	Additional cinematography
2024	Merry Christmas	Hindi; Tamil	
2024	Malaikottai Vaaliban	Malayalam	
