= Jack N' Jill =

2022 film directed by Santhosh Sivan

- Poster
- Directed by: Santosh Sivan
- Written by: Santosh Sivan; Ajil Sim; Vijesy Thottingal; Amith Mohan Rajeshwari; Suresh Kumar Raveendran
- Produced by: Santosh Sivan Productions; M. Prashanth Das
- Starring: Manju Warrier; Kalidas Jayaram; Shaylee Krishen; Soubin Shahir; Aju Varghese
- Cinematography: Santosh Sivan
- Edited by: Renjith Touchriver
- Music by: Jakes Bejoy; Gopi Sundar; Ram Surendar
- Production companies: Santosh Sivan Productions; SEWAS Films
- Distributed by: Joy Movie Productions; Sree Gokulam Gopalan
- Release date: 20 May 2022
- Country: India
- Language: Malayalam

Jack N' Jill (pronounced as Jack and Jill) is a 2022 Indian Malayalam-language science fiction comedy film directed by Santosh Sivan. It stars Manju Warrier, Kalidas Jayaram, Soubin Shahir, Shaylee Krishen, and Esther Anil. The film marks cinematographer Santosh Sivan's directorial comeback in Malayalam cinema after nearly seven years. It was released in theatres on 20 May 2022. The film is partially reshot in Tamil under the title Centimeter with Yogi Babu replacing Soubin Shahir and was also released on the same day. It received negative reviews from critics and was a box office bomb. This film marked the final film of veteran actor Nedumudi Venu following his death in October 2021.

== Plot ==
Kesh is a young scientist who returned from abroad to his grandfather's ancestral home in Kerala after winning an award in AI Robotics. He, along with his colleague, a miniature robot named Kuttaps, and childhood friends, plans to complete his deceased father's dream project named 'Jack N' Jill' which would boost the human brain to its maximum level. They search for a test object who is suffering from a brain-related disease, like dementia/amnesia, and eventually abduct an elderly person. However, phase 1 of the project fails due to a mistake made by Kesh's friend. Afterward, they find Parvathy, another potential test subject, as she is mentally unstable due to post-traumatic amnesia. Kesh makes her their next test subject. They successfully complete phase 1 and 2 of the project. After phase 2, Parvathy regains her memories (but she pretends to be abnormal) and develops some combat skills. The antagonists of the story are Stephen Tharakan and his son who want to establish a chemical factory, even though it would be detrimental to the environment. Stephen and his henchmen slaughter the entire family of Parvathy when her family tries to protect Aarthy, the daughter of Stephen Tharakan's deceased partner. Parvathy is injured badly during the incident and loses all her memories. Whether she avenges the death of her loved one forms the remainder of the story.

== Cast ==
- Manju Warrier as Parvathy
- Kalidas Jayaram as Kesh
- Soubin Shahir as Kuttaaps
- Yogi Babu as Centimeter (Tamil version)
- Shaylee Krishen as Tara
- Esther Anil as Arathy
- Aju Varghese as Dr. Subramaniam
- Indrans as Anthrappan
- Nedumudi Venu as Colonel Ramachandran Nair
- Basil Joseph as Ravi
- Ramesh Pisharody
- Ida Sofie Straume as Cheorlett
- Vineetha as Jalgi
- Gokul Anand as Joseph
- Sunil Varghese as Stephan Tharakan
- M Prashanth Das as Bhasker
- Sethu Lakshmi as Ammini Amma, Parvathy's grandmother

== Soundtrack ==
The songs are composed by Jakes Bejoy, Gopi Sundar and Ram Surendar.

- "Kim Kim" - Manju Warrier
- "Angane" - Sithara
- "Jack And Jill" - Jithin Raj
- "Enganokke Enganokke" - Ram Surendar, Sree Nanda
- "Annatha Pokki" - Kavya Ajit, Ram Surendar

== Release ==
=== Theatrical ===
The film was released theatrically on 20 May 2022.

=== Home media ===
The digital rights of the film is acquired by Amazon Prime Video and started streaming on 17 June 2022.

== Reception ==
=== Critical reception ===
The film received highly negative reviews from critics as well as the audience. S. R. Praveen of The Hindu stated "A bad advertisement for AI and cinema". Sanjith Sidhardhan of OTTplay gave 2 stars out of 5 and wrote "If Jack N' Jill was Santosh Sivan's attempt at making a quirky sci-fi film set against a village backdrop, it falls way off the mark with the screenplay all over the place. The actors look equally confused in this experimental film that fails to hold interest and gets bizarre as the story progresses.". Anjana George of The Times of India noted "There is violence, drugs and women assault, if not, this could have been a good children's film for the summer vacation." and gave 2.5 ratings out of 5.
