= Sreejaya Nair =

Indian film actress and dancer

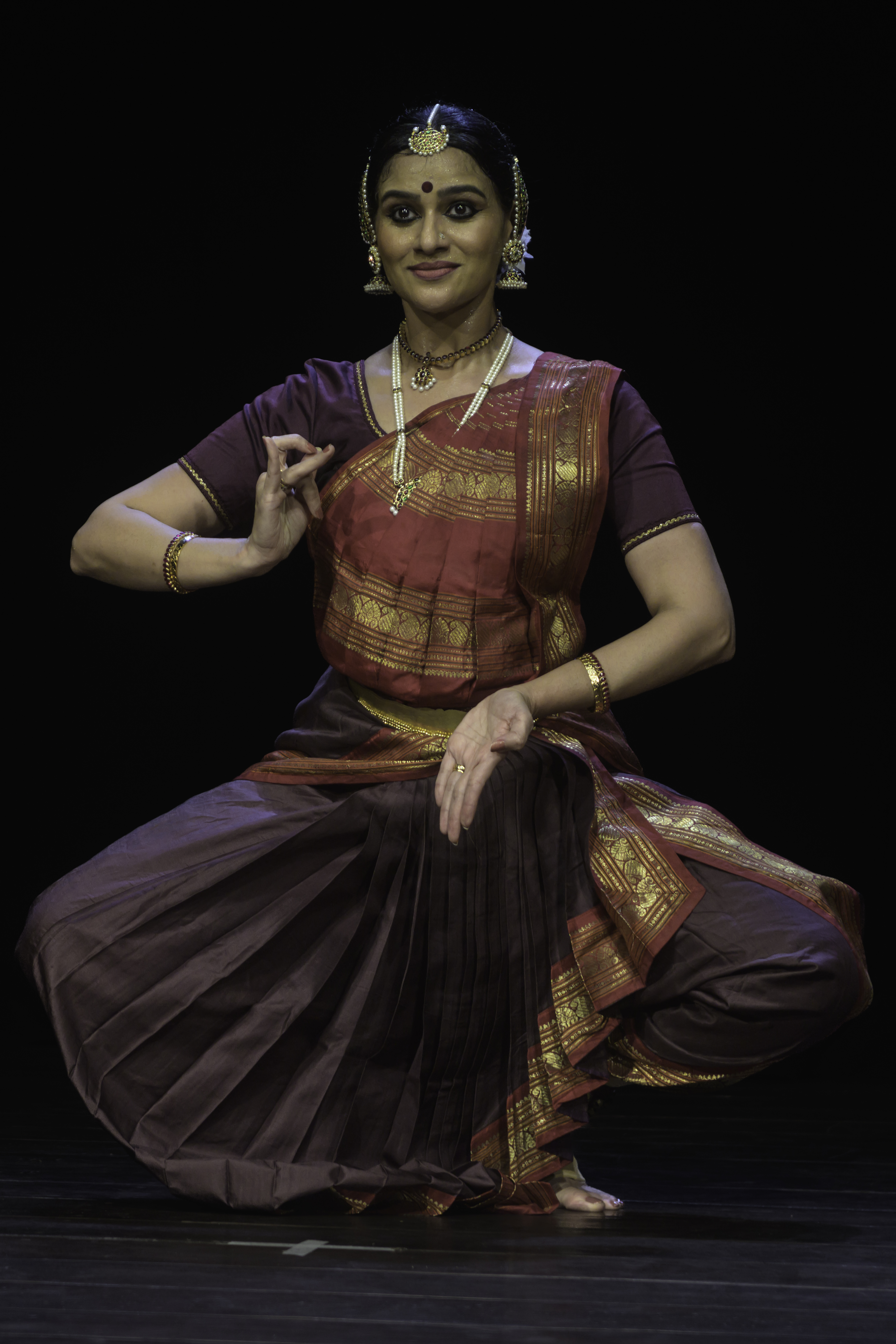
- Born: 7 September 1977 (age 48)
- Occupations: Actress, dancer
- Years active: 1992 – 2000 (acting); 2014 – present (acting)
- Spouse: Madhan Nair(2000-Present)
- Children: Mythili Nair
- Parent(s): Chandrasekhar, Jaya
- Website: sreejaya.in

== Biography ==
Sreejaya Nair is an Indian actress and dancer born on 7 September 1977 to Chandrasekhar & Jaya at Kothamangalam. She worked in the Malayalam film industry throughout 1990s and retired after marriage and returned to acting in 2014. She is a professional dancer and conducts a dance school named Sreejaya's School of Classical Dance in Bangalore.

== Early life ==
Sreejaya hails from Kothamangalam, Kerala, India. She began learning dance from the age of five under the teachers Kalamandalam Sumathi who is actress Asa Sharath’s mother and Kalamandalam Saraswathi. She joined Kerala Kalamandalam and took classes in Bharatanatyam, Mohiniyattam and Kuchipudi. She later began training under the teacher Chitra Chandrasekhar Dasarathy.

== Career ==
She made her film debut in the Malayalam drama film Kamaladalam in 1992. In 1998, she acted in comedy drama Summer in Bethlehem. She took a break after her marriage.

== Personal life ==
Sreejaya is married to businessman Madhan Nair and the couple has a daughter named Mythili. They moved to Kozhikode and then to Bangalore and Canada after marriage. Later returned to and settled in Bangalore. Sreejaya conducts a dance school named Sreejaya's School of Classical Dance in Bangalore, which has 1 branche in the city and trains more than 20 students.

== Filmography ==
=== Films ===
| Year | Title | Role | Notes |
|---|---|---|---|
| 1992 | Kamaladalam | Dancer, Malavika's friend | |
| 1994 | Sagaram Sakshi | Indu | |
| 1994 | Vendor Daniel State Licency | Balagopalan's sister | |
| 1994 | Ponthan Mada | Reshmi | |
| 1994 | Parinayam | Unnimaya's friend | |
| 1995 | Ormakalundayirikkanam | Ammu | |
| 1995 | Boxer | Reena Cheriyan | |
| 1997 | Superman | Nalini | |
| 1997 | Vamsam | Meenu / Meenakshi | |
| 1997 | Lelam | Ammini | |
| 1998 | Kanmadam | Suma | |
| 1998 | Summer in Bethlehem | Devika | |
| 1998 | Meenakshi Kalyanam | Lakshmi | |
| 1998 | Anuragakottaram | Anna | |
| 1998 | Ayal Kadha Ezhuthukayanu | Shobha | |
| 1998 | Rakthasakshikal Sindabad | Ammini | |
| 1999 | Pathram | Jessy Peter | |
| 1999 | Parassala Pachan Payyannur Paramu | Maneesha | |
| 1999 | Stalin Sivadas | Indhu | |
| 1999 | Veendum Chila Veettukaryangal | Lizzy | |
| 1999 | Mohakottaram | Nisha | |
| 2000 | Aanamuttathe Aangalamar | Mamatha Menon | |
| 2000 | Ayyappantamma Neyyappam Chuttu | Sr.Tissa | |
| 2014 | Avatharam | Valsala George | |
| 2017 | Careful | Mrs. Sudeep | |
| 2018 | Aravindante Athidhikal | Janaki Subhramanyam | |
| 2018 | Odiyan | Thankamani Varassiar | |
| 2021 | Vishudha Rathrikal | Noble Lady | |
| 2026 | Madhuvidhu | Mercy | |

=== Television ===
| Year | Show | Role | Channel | Notes |
|---|---|---|---|---|
| 1994 | Melappadam | | DD Malayalam | Serial |
| 1999-2000 | Shamanathalam | | Asianet | Serial |
| 2012-2013 | Aayirathil Oruval | | Mazhavil Manorama | Serial; Character - Vrinda; Best actress at Kazhcha TV Awards 2013 |
| | Verutha Alla Bharya | | Mazhavil Manorama | Reality TV |
| | Vanitha | | Mazhavil Manorama | |
| | Tharapakittu | | Kaumudy TV | |
| | Annie's Kitchen | Herself | Amrita TV | Talk show |
