= Madhuvidhu (2026 film) =

2026 Indian Malayalam-language film

- Theatrical release poster
- Directed by: Vishnu Aravind
- Written by: Bibin Mohan; Jai Vishnu
- Produced by: Ajith Vinayaka; Santhakumar; Malavika Krishnadas
- Starring: Sharaf U Dheen; Kalyani Panicker; Azees Nedumangad; Vijitha Vijayakumar; Jagadish; Sreejaya Nair; Saikumar
- Cinematography: Viswajith Odukkathil
- Edited by: Christy Sebastian
- Music by: Hesham Abdul Wahab
- Production companies: Ajith Vinayaka Films; Babu Ettan Films
- Distributed by: Ajith Vinayaka Films
- Release date: 23 April 2026
- Country: India
- Language: Malayalam
- Box office: ₹11.4 crore

Madhuvidhu (transl. Honeymoon) is a 2026 Indian Malayalam-language romantic comedy film directed by Vishnu Aravind and written by Bibin Mohan and Jai Vishnu. The film stars Sharaf U Dheen, Kalyani Panicker, Azees Nedumangad, Vijitha Vijayakumar, Jagadish, Sreejaya Nair and Saikumar. It is produced by Ajith Vinayaka under Ajith Vinayaka Films and co-produced by Santhakumar and Malavika Krishnadas under Babu Ettan Films. Viswajith Odukkathil handles the cinematography and Christy Sebastian edits the film. Hesham Abdul Wahab composes the songs and background score.

Madhuvidhu was released theatrically on 23 April 2026, receiving mixed to positive reviews, and became a commercial success.

== Plot ==
Amruthraj "Ammu" Aanjilimoottil is a successful café owner. Despite Ammu being interested in marriage, his prospects are hindered because of the superstitious belief that women who marry into the Aanjilimoottil family are cursed.

Ammu falls in love with Sneha Markose. Sneha belongs to the Markose family, which includes her younger sister Sophie, their father Markose, their aunt Mercy, and Mercy’s daughter Mili. Both Sneha and Sophie are initially engaged to brothers Joel and Tom, respectively. Markose, having witnessed Mercy’s abusive marriage, is deeply protective of the women in his family.

Although disappointed by the broken engagement with Joel, Markose eventually agrees to Sneha marrying Ammu. However, their wedding plans are disrupted when Mercy elopes with Ammu’s father Rajkumar, revealing a past romance between them that had been forcibly separated. Feeling betrayed, Markose calls off the wedding, leading to a temporary separation between Ammu and Sneha.

The couple later reconciles, and Sneha agrees to marry Ammu on the conditions that he moves out of his family home and excludes Mercy from the wedding. Ammu agrees, but tensions persist after marriage, especially between Sneha and Mercy, eventually causing Sneha to return to her parental home after a conflict with Ammu.

Ammu initially blames his father for the turmoil, but Rajkumar explains the depth of his love for Mercy and the hardships they endured. Understanding this, Ammu reconciles with his father and seeks forgiveness from Sneha and Markose, leading to another reconciliation.

As Markose prepares for Sophie’s grand wedding to Tom to restore family honor, Sophie confides in Ammu that she is actually in love with Joel, Tom’s brother and Sneha’s former fiancé. Unable to confront her father, she asks Ammu for help. Ammu attempts to persuade Joel and Tom, but both initially refuse to act.

At a pre-wedding gathering, Tom publicly challenges Sophie’s lover to reveal himself. Amidst the chaos, Markose realizes Ammu’s involvement and confronts him angrily. Eventually, Joel confesses his love for Sophie, and Tom reveals he was aware of their relationship, orchestrating the confrontation to force honesty.

Markose comes to terms with his own shortcomings as a father, acknowledging that his strictness prevented open communication. He recognizes Ammu’s role in supporting Sophie and forgives him. Sneha also reconciles with Ammu, realizing his integrity and commitment.

Sophie and Joel are married, and the Aanjilimoottil family breaks the supposed curse as its members build harmonious relationships with their wives. The film concludes with Vimal hoping for success in his own love story with a girl named Thumbi.

== Cast ==
- Sharaf U Dheen in dual roles as:
  - Aanjilimoottil Amruth Raj "Ammu"
  - Aanjilimoottil Narayanan Kartha
- Kalyani Panicker as Sneha Markose
- Jagadish in dual roles as:
  - Aanjilimoottil Rajkumar
  - Kizhikattoor Kochuraja
- Azees Nedumangad as Aanjilimoottil Ambareesh
- Vijitha Vijayakumar as Chinnu
- Sreejaya Nair as Mercy
- Saikumar as Markose
- Anusreya Rajan as Sofiya Markose
- Amal Jose Antony as Aanjilimoottil Vimal Raj
- Kaumudi Kalarikkandy as Mili
- Vineeth Thattil David as Surammavan
- Suresh Babu as Shekharan
- Sanju Madhu as Jijo Thankachan
- Murali Krishnan as Boney
- Shersha Sherief as Joel
- Lucky as Tom
- Shyni Vijayan as Subhadra Kunjamma
- Bindu Panicker as Gynaecologist (cameo appearance)
- Vineeth Sreenivasan as Aanjilimoottil Arumughan Kartha (cameo appearance)
- Urvashi as Sarojini (Photo presence)

== Soundtrack ==
Madhuvidhu

Soundtrack album by Hesham Abdul Wahab
- Released: 4 April 2026
- Recorded: 2026
- Studios: Aural Alchemy Productions, Ernakulam; Mlounge, Ernakulam; HW Studio, Ernakulam; The Mystic's Room, Chennai
- Genre: Feature film soundtrack
- Length: 28:36
- Language: Malayalam
- Label: Zee Music Company

Hesham Abdul Wahab chronology
Made in Korea (2026)	Madhuvidhu (2026)	Once More (2026)

The soundtrack album of the film is composed by Hesham Abdul Wahab. Zee Music Company procured the audio rights of the soundtrack. The first single Mellave Mellave was released on 29 March 2026. The second single En Kaathaake Nee was released on 9 April 2026.

No.	Title	Lyrics	Singer(s)	Length
1.	"Mellave Mellave"	B. K. Harinarayanan	Vineeth Sreenivasan, Sithara Krishnakumar	03:28
2.	"En Kaathaake Nee"	Suhail Koya	Chinmayi Sripada, Hesham Abdul Wahab	02:59
3.	"Hridhayame"	Arun Alat	K. S. Harisankar, Divya S. Menon	03:24
4.	"Nin Ormathan"	Arun Alat	Job Kurian, Athira Job	04:10
5.	"Erathil Kattil"	Adhri Joe	Vineeth Sreenivasan	03:08
6.	"Kaninmaniye"	Arun Alat	Rimi Tomy, Hesham Abdul Wahab, B. Murali Krishna	03:46
7.	"Va Nee Va"	Arun Alat	Hesham Abdul Wahab, Anila Rajeev	03:16
8.	"Puthan Penne Manavatty"	Fejo	Fejo	04:25
Total length:				28:36

== Release ==
Madhuvidhu was released theatrically on 23 April 2026 through Ajith Vinayaka Films (India) and Phars Film (GCC).

=== Home Media ===
The film’s digital rights have been acquired by SonyLIV. The film started streaming from 22 May 2026.

== Reception ==
=== Critical reception ===
Madhuvidhu received mixed to positive reviews from critics, who praised the performances of the lead cast but noted issues with the script's depth. S. R. Praveen of The Hindu described the film as a light-hearted entertainer that "squanders a promising conflict" in its second half. Dhanya K. Vilayil of The Indian Express appreciated the performances of Sharaf U Dheen and Jagadish, noting the film's situational humor. Swathi P. Ajith of Malayala Manorama wrote "Madhuvidhu is a film that starts with a compelling idea and a warm, engaging tone but loses direction as it moves forward."

Vivek Santhosh of The New Indian Express gave 2.5/5, calling it "a fun romantic comedy short on emotional weight" but highlighting the chemistry between Sharaf U Dheen and Kalyani Panicker. Sreeju Sudhakaran of Rediff.com gave 2.5/5 and wrote "Madhuvidhu is a family entertainer that works in parts but falters when its drama turns unconvincing." Lensmen Reviews noted that while the direction was competent, the plot felt thin towards the climax.

=== Box office ===
Madhuvidhu earned a worldwide gross of ₹4.3 crore in its first four days of release. Within 19 days, the film grossed ₹11.4 crore worldwide and was declared a commercial success.
