= Chinmaya Vidyalaya, Kannur =

Coordinates: 11.8787°N 75.3686°E

- Kannur, Kerala, India; India

Information
- Type: Private
- Established: 1977
- School board: CBSE
- School district: Kannur
- Authority: Chinmaya Mission Trust
- Principal: C. Radhakrishnan
- Grades: K to 12
- Education system: Indian
- Affiliation: CBSE - Delhi (No. 930028)
- Website: http://www.chinmayakannur.ac.in/

Chinmaya Vidyalaya, Kannur is a senior secondary school in Kannur, Kerala, India. The school has two campuses in Kannur.

== Origin ==
The foundation stone for Chinmaya Vidyalaya, Cannanore was laid by H.H. Swami Chinmayananda on 3 February 1977. In 1989 it grew to a full-fledged secondary high school affiliated with the CBSE, New Delhi. In August 1989 Vidyalaya was upgraded into the Senior Secondary level. Students were admitted to the science stream on a merit basis. A commerce stream was introduced in 1995.

== Chinmaya Balabhavan ==
The Chinmaya Balabhavan is a part of Chinmaya Vidyalaya situated at the heart of the city where students from class I-V are taught.

== Chinmaya Vidyalaya, Govindagiri ==
The classes from 1st to 12th are at the main campus in Govindagiri. At 12 acres (49,000 m^{2}), this is one of the largest school campuses in Kerala. The school also sponsors 10 children from Kargil and Ladakh who are unable to pursue their education there due to border conflicts. This school imbues culture in its students and is a School With A Difference.

== Alumni ==
- Manju Warrier, Malayalam cinema actress
