= Ee Puzhayum Kadannu =

- Theatrical release poster
- Directed by: Kamal
- Written by: Shatrughnan
- Produced by: Kannan Perumudiyoor
- Starring: Dileep; Manju Warrier; Mohini; Biju Menon
- Cinematography: P. Sukumar
- Edited by: K. Rajagopal
- Music by: Johnson
- Production company: Harishree Films International
- Distributed by: Harisree Films Release
- Release date: 20 December 1996
- Running time: 139 minutes
- Country: India
- Language: Malayalam

Ee Puzhayum Kadannu (transl. Across this river) is a 1996 Indian Malayalam-language romantic drama film directed by Kamal and starring Dileep and Manju Warrier. The film was a box office success. It was remade in Telugu as Pelli Peetalu (1998), in Tamil as Kanna Unnai Thedukiren (2001) and in Kannada as Sambhrama (1999).

== Plot ==
Anjali is the third daughter of a late music teacher. She lives with her two elder sisters, Ashwathy and Aarthi, and grandmother. Her life changes when Gopi moves into his brother's house as her neighbor. They fall in love. However, she has a problem with their marriage since she has two elder unmarried sisters. Gopi finds a groom for Ashwathy, but the marriage is called off as she is mute and deaf. After two failed attempts to get her married, they all feel hopeless when out of the blue, Gopi's friend admits that he loves Ashwathy. Hence, Gopi helps him marry her. Following this, they try to get Aarthi married; but she admits to never having gotten over her old boyfriend. Gopi and Anjali track him down and ask him to marry her. He admits to liking her but reveals that his mother would ask for a lot of dowry. Gopi does everything he can, including making his brother loan out his house to obtain the money and the ornaments they demanded, which were provided by Aarthi's boyfriend himself.

However, that night, when their drunkard step-brother steals the ornaments from Anjali's house, Gopi finds him and accidentally kills him. He confesses to Anjali that he killed him, but they hide this until Aarthi's wedding is over. Eventually, Gopi is arrested in front of the wedding guests.

After five years, when Gopi is back from jail, Anjali and her whole family are waiting for him, and the movie ends on a positive note.

== Cast ==
- Dileep as Gopi, a watch repairer; a neighbour of Anjali who falls for her
- Manju Warrier as Anjali, the youngest of three sisters who falls in love with Gopi, a salesgirl
- Biju Menon as Unni, Gopi's friend, who secretly loves Anjali's mute and deaf sister, later husband
- Mohini as Ashwathy, the eldest of three sisters who is mute and deaf; an artisan
- Chippy as Aarathi, the middle one among three sisters
- Sudheesh as Satheshan, Aarathi's love interest, later Husband
- Lekshmi Krishnamoorthy as Manthottathil Maheshwari Amma, Grandmother of the three sisters
- Harisree Ashokan as Ramankutty, Gopi's best friend
- Meghanathan as Raghu, half brother of the three sisters
- N. F. Varghese as Sukumaran, Gopi's elder brother
- Reena as The deceased mother of the three sisters.
- Bindu Panicker as Bharathi, Gopi's sister-in-law
- Baby Neethu Praveen as Sukumaran's and Bharathi's daughter.
- Oduvil Unnikrishnan as Achuthan Nair, uncle of the three sisters
- Remadevi
- Shilpa Punnoose as Young Aswathy
- K. P. A. C. Premachandran as Bharathan master, a music teacher and father of Anjali, Aarathi and Ashwathy.

== Production ==
This film marked the first collaboration between Kamal and lyricist Gireesh Puthenchery. The latter had met Kamal at Hotel Maharani in Kozhikode and while drunk, chided him for not collaborating with him. Although Gireesh was drunk and apologised the following day, Kamal agreed to collaborate with him as opposed to his regular collaborator Kaithapram Damodaran Namboothiri.

== Soundtrack ==
Ee Puzhayum Kadannu

Soundtrack album by Johnson
- Released: 1997
- Genre: Film soundtrack
- Labels: Sargam Speed Audios; Majid Cassettes; Satyam Audios

The movie has melodious songs composed by Johnson, with lyrics by Gireesh Puthenchery.

Track	Song title	Singer(s)	Other notes
1	"Raathinkal Poothaali"	K. J. Yesudas	Raga: Tilang
2	"Devakanyaka"	K. J. Yesudas	
3	"Paathira Pullunarnnu"	K. J. Yesudas	Raga: Abheri
4	"Vaidoorya Kammalaninju"	M. G. Sreekumar, K. S. Chithra, Sujatha Mohan	
5	"Sreelalolayam"	K. S. Chithra	Raga: Sankarabharanam
6	"Devakanyaka"	K. S. Chithra	
7	"Kaakka Karumban"	Sujatha Mohan	Raga: Kedaragowla
8	"Thankachengila"	G. Venugopal	Raga: Chakravakam
9	"Vaidoorya Kammalaninju"	M. G. Sreekumar	

== Box office ==
The film became a commercial success.

== Awards ==
Manju Warrier won both Kerala State Film Award for Best Actress & Filmfare Award for Best Actress – Malayalam for portraying her role Anjali' in this film.
