= Ennum Eppozhum =

2015 film by Sathyan Anthikad

- Theatrical release poster
- Directed by: Sathyan Anthikad
- Screenplay by: Ranjan Pramod
- Story by: Raveendran
- Produced by: Antony Perumbavoor
- Starring: Mohanlal; Manju Warrier; Innocent; Lena; Reenu Mathews; Jacob Gregory
- Cinematography: Neil D' Cunha
- Edited by: K. Rajagopal
- Music by: Vidyasagar
- Production company: Aashirvad Cinemas
- Distributed by: Maxlab Cinemas and Entertainments (Kerala); Four Brother's Release (India); MAS Film and Entertainment Ltd & Ashirvad UK (Europe Release)
- Release date: 27 March 2015
- Running time: 147 minutes
- Country: India
- Language: Malayalam
- Box office: ₹120 crore (Kerala)

Ennum Eppozhum (transl. Forever and always) is a 2015 Indian Malayalam-language comedy-drama film directed by Sathyan Anthikad and written by Ranjan Pramod based on a story by Raveendran. It was produced by Antony Perumbavoor under the production company Aashirvad Cinemas. It stars Mohanlal and Manju Warrier, alongside a supporting cast, including Innocent, Reenu Mathews, Jacob Gregory, Lena, and Renji Panicker. It also marked the reunion of Mohanlal and Manju Warrier after 17 years. Ennum Eppozhum was released across India on 27 March 2015 and met with mixed reviews from critics. The film was a commercial success though at the box office. The song "Malarvaka Kombathu" won Kerala State Film Award for Best Singer for P. Jayachandran.

== Synopsis ==
Ennum Eppozhum tells the story of two people - Vineeth N. Pillai, a senior reporter of Vanitharatnam magazine, who is a sloth and lacks inspiration in his work and Deepa, a junior family court lawyer who is eager to do pro bono cases for the goodwill of the society. Vineeth is holding on to this job due to his mother's rapport with the magazine management. Vineeth's new boss, Kalyani, wants to throw him out of his position due to his negligence in duty. He has to interview Deepa for the new edition of the magazine. However, he was not even able to present the need for an appointment with her due to Deepa's schedule and other commitments. Finally, Vineeth becomes close with Deepa, her child, and friends through a series of humiliating events. Out of pressure, he throws his resignation at Kalyani but is later reinstated in his post by her mother. Kalyani becomes attracted to Vineeth, but it leaves in the air without much response. Deepa lands in trouble and Vineeth helps her. The resulting events are narrated through the film.

== Cast ==
- Mohanlal as Vineeth N. Pillai, a lazy senior correspondent of women's magazine "Vanitharathnam"
- Manju Warrier as Adv. Deepa, a single parent & junior lawyer who has a headstrong perception and attitude towards life and a classical dancer
- Innocent as Kariachan, a retired postmaster
- Lena as Farah, a close friend of Deepa and a boutique owner
- Reenu Mathews as Kalyani, newly appointed editor-in-chief of Vanitharathnam
- Jacob Gregory as Mathan, a dim-witted photographer who accompanies Vineeth in his assignment
- Minon John as Ganapathy, Mathan's assistant
- Renji Panicker as a Builder
- Usha S Karunagapally as Rosy Mol, Kariachan's wife, who has worked in a radio station
- Baby Adhvaitha as Miya
- Kalpana as Bindhu Ninan
- Santhosh Keezhattoor as Jaleel, Taxi driver
- Chali Pala as Georgettan
- Dileesh Pothan as Deepa's client's Son
- Sreeya Ramesh as Dr. Usha, Wife of Deepa's Ex-husband
- Kozhikode Sarada as Deepa's client
- Disney James as Vytila Byju, Gangster who helps Deepa's client
- Ajith as Advocate
- Babu Annur as Peon
- Baiju V.K. as Advocate Sundararajan
- Antony as Senior Advocate of Deepa
- Kochouseph Chittilappilly as himself
- Jayaprakash Kuzhoor as Judge
- Pradeep Kottayam as Canteen supplier
- Divya M Nair

== Production ==
=== Development ===
Sathyan Anthikad announced that his next film after Oru Indian Pranayakadha will be a Mohanlal-starrer for Aashirvad Cinemas. Since Snehaveedu (2011), Mohanlal and Sathyan have been collaborating after a gap of 4 years. Antony Perumbavoor has been the producer of all their movies since Rasathanthram. Initially, it was reported to be the comeback film of Sathyan Anthikad-Sreenivasan-Mohanlal team. Sathyan later denied the reports and said that he is planning a different project for Aashirvad Cinemas, even though a project with Mohanlal and Sreenivasan is also in the pipeline.

After Snehaveedu, Sathyan made it clear that he would not be writing scripts for his own films. Since 2006, he has been writing his own scripts, which led to criticism that he is rehashing his earlier hits. In March, Sathyan Anthikad announced that Ranjan Pramod will be scripting the film based on actor Raveendran's story. Ennum Eppozhum be the third film for Sathyan written by Ranjan after Manassinakkare (2003) and Achuvinte Amma (2005). Ranjan has earlier scripted Mohanlal starred Naran (2005) and Photographer (2006) (which was also his directorial debut). Sameer Thahir was initially announced as the cinematographer and was later replaced by Neil D'Cunha of Philips and the Monkey Pen (2013) fame. Vidyasagar and Rafeeq Ahammed returned as the music composer and lyricist, respectively after Oru Indian Pranayakadha.

Writing the script Ranjan said, "It is a challenge for any writer to pen a script to accommodate two brilliant actors like Mohanlal and Manju with such huge fan followings." It was Antony Perumbavoor who called Ranjan to script the film. Earlier, Aashirvad Cinemas had an agreement with Ranjan to make a film with Manju which did not materialize. So, Antony asked him whether he would be able to write a script for her and Mohanlal. Ranjan had to postpone a film that he was planning to direct to script the film.

=== Casting ===
In August, Manju Warrier was confirmed to play the female lead as Adv. Deepa. This is her first film with Mohanlal after her comeback. Reenu Mathews was roped in to play the role of Kalyani. She joined the sets in the second schedule in January. Innocent plays the role of Kariachan, a retired postmaster while Lena plays Farah, Deepa's best friend cum a boutique owner. Jacob Gregory of ABCD: American-Born Confused Desi (2013) fame plays the role of videographer Maathan who assists Vineeth in his assignments. Drama artist Usha S. Karunagapally plays the role of Kariachan's wife Rosy, a radio announcer while Baby Adhwika was chosen for the role of Deepa's daughter Miya.

=== Filming ===
The film was originally scheduled to start filming on 31 October 2014, and Mohanlal was said to join the next day. The shoot commenced on 1 November 2014 at Kochi. The film took a schedule break on 15 November when Mohanlal went for his Antarctica trip. The second schedule commenced on 4 December. By the end of January 2015, the shooting got completed and entered into post-production stage. Sathyan Anthikkad who is known for naming his films only during its filming or in the post-production stage, officially announced the title Ennum Eppozhum on 8 February.

== Soundtrack ==
Ennum Eppozhum

Soundtrack album by Vidyasagar
- Released: 15 March 2015
- Recorded: Varsha Vallaki Studios
- Genre: Feature Film Soundtrack
- Length: 17:42
- Language: Malayalam
- Label: Satyam Audios
- Producer: Vidyasagar

Vidyasagar chronology
| Mariyam Mukku (2015) | Ennum Eppozhum (2015) | Eli (2015) |

All lyrics are written by Rafeeq Ahammed; all music is composed by Vidyasagar.

| No. | Title | Artist(s) | Length |
|---|---|---|---|
| 1. | "Malarvaka Kombathu" | P. Jayachandran, Rajalakshmy | 4:48 |
| 2. | "Nilavum Mayunnnu" | K. S. Harisankar | 4:19 |
| 3. | "Dhithiki Dhithiki" | Binni Krishnakumar | 4:32 |
| 4. | "Pularipoo Penne" | Vijay Yesudas | 3:58 |
| Total length: | | | 17:42 |

The song Dhithiki Dhithiki had Manju Warrier doing a classical dance. The song was composed in the raga Sarasangi. The song "Pularipoo Penne" is based on "Adarale Pilla" from Madhavayya Gari Manavadu.

== Release ==
The film was released on 27 March 2015 in 215 centers all over India (89 centers in Kerala), making it the biggest release for a Sathyan Anthikad cinema. MAS Film and Entertainment distributed the film in Europe, while Achu and Achu's Creations in Australia and New Zealand, Singapore Coliseum in Singapore and Celluloid Japan in Japan.

=== Home media ===
The Blu-ray, DVD and VCD of Ennum Eppozhum was released by Central Home Entertainment.

== Reception ==
=== Critical response ===
The film mostly received mixed reviews.

Malayala Manorama rated 3.5 out of 5 stars and said "The highlight of the film is its director-actors combo". "Ennum Eppozhum is for you, if you belong to that set of people who believe that films should be as light as possible since life is unbearably heavy". Gulf News wrote "Ennum Eppozhum is a clean family drama. Ennum Eppozhum makes no lofty pretensions but narrates a simple story that could be yours, or your neighbour’s or maybe the woman up the alley". The Hindu stated, "Ennum Eppozhum is a family drama that sans the drama. Ennum Eppozhum is buoyed by its star cast and a host of light moments though not particularly funny. This is the second in series aimed at bringing back star power of Manju Warrier. Its romance is treated with subtlety and without challenging conservative beliefs, making one drive to open conclusions and ‘drivel confusion’."

=== Box office ===
Ennum Eppozhum opened well at the box office. According to the Film Producers Association of Kerala, the film is a "Hit" even though it could not meet the high expectations of the audience. It was added that the film "would break even and certainly bring profits to the producer". The association also said that the report card for the first quarter of 2015 looked bleak except for the success of Oru Vadakkan Selfie and Ennum Eppozhum. However, Suresh Shenoy stated that the Vishu festival season of 2015 had "turned out to be a dampener except for the continuing rush for Oru Vadakkan Selfie". The film is one of the profitable Malayalam films in the first half of 2015. As per June 2015, the film grossed ₹12 crore (US$1.3 million) from Kerala box office.

=== Awards ===
Kerala State Film Awards

- Best Male Singer - P. Jayachandran (Malarvaka Kombathu)

Kerala Film Critics Association Awards

- Nominated - Best Music Direction - Vidyasagar

2015 Asiavision Awards

- Most promising new singer - K. S. Harisankar (Nilaavum Maayunnu)
- Nominated - Best Music Direction - Vidyasagar

Asianet Film Awards

- Multifaceted Personality of the Year - Innocent
- Best Film - Nominated
- Best Actor - Mohanlal - Nominated
- Best Actress - Manju Warrier - Nominated (shared with Rani Padmini)
