= Pathram =

1999 film directed by Joshiy

- Theatrical Release Poster
- Directed by: Joshy
- Screenplay by: Renji Panicker
- Produced by: K. Gangaduth; Executive Producer: G. P. Vijayakumar
- Starring: Suresh Gopi; Biju Menon
- Cinematography: Sanjeev Shankar
- Edited by: K. Sankunni
- Music by: S. P. Venkatesh; Gireesh Puthenchery (Poem)
- Production company: Seven Arts Films
- Distributed by: Seven Arts International Ltd.; Surya Cine Arts; Kavyachandrika & Manu International (PJ Entertainments UK)
- Release date: 15 February 1999
- Running time: 178 minutes(2hour 58minutes)
- Country: India
- Language: Malayalam

Pathram (transl. Newspaper) is a 1999 Indian Malayalam-language neo-noir political thriller film written by Renji Panicker and directed by Joshi. The movie stars Suresh Gopi and Manju Warrier in the lead role

The film collected over ₹5.15 crore in 25 days at the box office. It became a blockbuster and was the second highest-grossing Malayalam film of 1999 behind Friends. The film ran for over 250 days in theatres. The film was known for the controversies surrounding it when leading Malayalam dailies Malayala Manorama and Mathrubhumi boycotted the film for portraying them in a bad light. The film's music and lyrics were by S. P. Venkatesh and Gireesh Puthenchery, art direction By Sabu Pravadas, and publicity designing by Gayathri Ashokan. The film's location was Ernakulam and surrounding places.

For her incredible performance as Devika Shekhar, Manju Warrier went on to win her record fourth consecutive Filmfare Award for Best Actress - Malayalam

== Plot ==
Nandagopal, an associate editor with one of the leading newspapers Kerala Reshmi, is an aggressive and daring journalist who enjoys a reputation among the media circle. He is the son of Venugopal, an iconic journalist, who was killed by the textile mafia for being a staunch supporter of trade unions. In Kochi, Nandan meets Shekaran, an old naxalite and his father's friend, who is running Jagratha, a newspaper which is feared by the hypocritical political class. Shekaran's outspoken and belligerent nature has earned him more enemies than friends, and he is constantly fighting Vishwanathan, an estranged ideological disciple of Shekaran, who rules the city with his money and power.

Vishwanathan holds a large share in Kerala Reshmi (acquired through deceit) and enjoys huge political clout at the state and central levels. C.I Haridas, a close friend of Shekaran, informs him about a vital source to collect evidence against Vishwanathan. Shekaran decides to expose Vishwanathan's role in the murder of Vincent Peter and numerous other crimes by publishing the confessions made by a henchman of Vishwanathan. The plan is revealed to Vishwanathan by a key journalist in Jagratha, effectively double-crossing Shekaran. A bomb explosion orchestrated by Vishwanathan eliminates Shekaran and C.I. Haridas.

Jagratha, the newspaper run by Shekaran is inherited by Devika Shekar, the only daughter of Shekaran, who is a fiery journalist like her father. Nandan, who was very close to Sekharan, manages to ensure that the case is investigated by an incorruptible investigating officer. Firoze Mohammed IPS, an old admirer of Nandan, is gathering evidence against Vishwanathan. Nandan is arrested by the police in a fabricated case and sacked from Kerala Reshmi. Meanwhile, Firoz decides to arrest Vishwanathan as he makes a drastic headway into the case. While arresting Vishwanathan, Firoz is killed by the latter and his henchmen. Nandan is released on bail and takes the law into his hands. He shoots down Vishwanathan and takes over as the new chief editor of Jagratha.

== Cast ==
- Suresh Gopi as Nandagopal / Nandan
- Manju Warrier as Devika Shekhar / Devu
- N. F. Varghese as Vishwanathan, The main antagonist
- Murali as Shekharan, Devika's Father
- Biju Menon as SP Firoz Mohammed IPS, Nandan's Friend
- Cochin Haneefa as DIG David Sabhapathy IPS
- Janardhanan as Kuruvithadam Baby
- Jagannatha Varma as Paattathil Outhakkutty
- Babu Namboothiri as Warrier
- Abhirami as Shilpa Mary Cherian
- Jose Prakash as Madhavan
- Vijayakumar as Vincent Peter
- Spadikam George as CI Thomas Vazhakkali
- Vijay Menon as Vipin, Still Photographer
- Kunchan as Kunjoos / Nair
- Sarath Das as Ibnu
- Nandu Pothuval as Kuttikanam
- Vimal Raj as Aandavan
- K. P. A. C. Azeez as K.K. Nambiar
- James as Aravindan
- Mohan Jose as Kodupalli Surendran
- Chali Pala as ASI Parameswara Kurup
- Shammi Thilakan as CI Haridas
- M. S. Thripunithura as Konathiri
- T. P. Madhavan as Harivamsilal Pannalal Sett
- Reena as Vasundhara Thampi
- Praseetha Menon as Monica David Sabhapathy, Sabhapathy's Daughter
- Sukumari as Vincent's Mother
- Sreejaya Nair as Jessy Peter, Vincent's Sister
- Usharani as Outhakkutty's Wife
- Keerikkadan Jose as Chandan Bhai
- Gayathri Varsha as Aswathi, Journalist
- Karthika Kannan as Journalist
- Indulekha as Journalist
- Jayasurya as Journalist
- Abraham Koshy as Sub Inspector

== Reception ==
K Jayalakshmi of Deccan Herald wrote, "Given the publicity and promise preceding the film, one was expecting more than the usual crime and punishment drama. However, do not go expecting a behind-the-scenes peek at a newspaper office. What one is offered is a highly unrealistic, idealistic, fired-up illusion of investigative journalism. Time-pass stuff. Malayalam movie can never have a dearth of bad guys. Check out the baddies in this one, the one in Khadi and the other in khaki. Take your pick. Equally repulsive, both. This action-packed movie from Joshi has some very realistic fights and some explicit scenes on police atrocities, if nothing else".

== Awards and nominations ==
- Filmfare Award for Best Actress - Malayalam - Manju Warrier
