= Kannezhuthi Pottum Thottu =

1999 film by T. K. Rajeev Kumar

- Directed by: T. K. Rajeev Kumar
- Written by: T. K. Rajeev Kumar
- Produced by: Maniyanpilla Raju; Radhakrishnan; G. Suresh Kumar
- Starring: Manju Warrier; Thilakan; Biju Menon; Abbas
- Cinematography: Ravi K. Chandran
- Edited by: A. Sreekar Prasad
- Music by: M. G. Radhakrishnan; Sharreth (score)
- Production company: One Two One Creations
- Distributed by: Soorya Cine Arts
- Release date: May 16, 1999
- Country: India
- Language: Malayalam

Kannezhuthi Pottum Thottu (transl. With lined eyes and a pottu) is a 1999 Indian Malayalam-language drama film written and directed by T. K. Rajeev Kumar. It stars Manju Warrier, Thilakan, Biju Menon, Abbas, and Kalabhavan Mani. The film features songs composed by M. G. Radhakrishnan and background score by Sharreth.

The plot follows Bhadra, a female farmhand who seeks revenge on landlord Nateshan for murdering her parents when she was a child. Manju Warrier was a strong competitor for Shabana Azmi in the final round of National Film Awards 1999 and received a National Film Award - Special Mention for her excellent performance as Bhadra.

== Plot ==
A young woman named Bhadra wants to take revenge against a landlord, Natesan, who murdered her parents 15 years ago. She gets a job at Natesan's land. The other female workers help her get familiar with the new job. Natesan's son, who has an eye on Bhadra, grabs her without her consent. She gets furious but her workmates calm her. One fine day, she notices that a man, Chindan, who is mentally ill is ill-treated. She befriends him.

That night, the eldest worker narrates a story about a man who gave his life for the land. It was a lie set up by Natesan to hide his killing of Bhadra's father. Bhadra always goes to the spot where her father was buried alive.

Bhadra then meets Rosakutty who now works for Uthaman (Natesan's son) and seduces him. She gets angry at her and tries to kill her. But her attachment to Rosa makes her let go.

Bhadra falls in love with Moosakutty, a bangle seller and fisherman whose father was also murdered by Natesan. She remembers the past. Her father was a trade union leader, and they had protested against the landlord (Natesan) for increasing the wages. Her father and mother were doting parents to Bhadra. Natesan had an eye on Bhadra's mother, and to get hold of her, he buried him alive on the farmland. He then makes up a story of sacrifice that spreads like folklore. Bhadra's mother comes running hearing the news. When Natesan tries to grab her, she runs along with Bhadra. Bhadra's mother gives her a sickle and says to run away and avenge her parents' death. Bhadra, from a distance, sees her mother pouring kerosene and burning herself alive. Bhadra then lights a lamp at the spot every night.

Rosakutty is killed by Uthaman. Bhadra now secures a job in Natesan's house as a help, and looks for an opportunity to kill Natesan. Once Natesan's wife asks the Namboodiri about her husband's health and he says there is an issue. He suggests that theeyattu must be done to appease the Goddess.

Several women perform mudiyattam to appease the Goddess during theeyattu and secure health. Chindan points a woman to Bhadra and says that she is being married to Uthaman. Bhadra is gripped by rage and seeks the blessings of the goddess. When the Kali gives vermillion, she prays to the goddess and applies it on her forehead. She goes to the place where women are appeasing the goddess by performing mudiyattam, and unwraps her long hair. She then prays to the goddess and swings it along with the beats, appeasing the goddess. She begins her plan the next day.

Bhadra acts as if she is interested in Natesan. She tries to make Natesan attracted to her and also seduces Uthaman. Both son and father become arch-enemies in the name of Bhadra. Bhadra invites both to the place where her father was murdered to meet her.

Natesan comes first, followed by Uthaman. A brawl ensues between the two. When it rains, both slip into the field. Bhadra breaks open the Mada and watches as the field gets flooded. Due to the winds, a power cable breaks down into the water. Uthaman kills Natesan, just as Bhadra had planned, and Uthaman is electrocuted to death by the wire.

In the end, Bhadra marries Moosakutty.

== Cast ==
- Manju Warrier as Bhadra
- Thilakan as Ettuveettil Natesan Muthalali
- Biju Menon as Uthaman (Kochu Muthalali)
- Abbas as Moosakutty (voice dubbed by Krishnachandran)
- Kalabhavan Mani as Chindan
- Kaviyoor Renuka as Sarojini, Natesan Muthalali's wife and Uthaman's mother
- Siddique as Chandrappan, Bhadra's father
- Maniyanpilla Raju as Mulaku
- Ravi Vallathol as Chackochi
- Kunchan as Natesan's Helper
- Poojappura Ravi as Vaidyar
- Kannur Sreelatha as Rosakutty
- Kanakalatha as Kanakam
- Bhagyashree as Gowri, Bhadra's mother
- Baby Krishna as Child Bhadra
- Poojappura Radha Krishnan
- Kuttyedathi Vilasini
- Kozhikode Sarada
- Bobby Kottarakkara

== Production ==
This is the first Malayalam movie done fully in Avid post-production design, edited in Media Composer, dubbed, re-recorded, and mixed in Avid Audio Vision. After completing the film, Manju Warrier took a sabbatical to marry Dileep and start a family life. The filming was held at Kuttanad.

== Soundtrack ==
The songs were composed by M. G. Radhakrishnan, and the lyrics were written by Kavalam Narayana Panicker. The film score was composed by Sharreth. Although Mohanlal had not acted in the film, he sang the song "Kaithappoovin" with K. S. Chithra.

Kannezhuthi Pottum Thottu (Original Motion Picture Soundtrack)
No.	Title	Singer(s)	Length
1.	"Chembazhukka Chembazhukka" (Version 1)	K. J. Yesudas, Kalabhavan Mani, Manju Warrier	3:26
2.	"Kaithappoovin"	Mohanlal, K. S. Chithra	4:03
3.	"Meenakkodikkaate"	K. S. Chithra	4:17
4.	"Chembazhukka Chembazhukka" (Version 2)	K. J. Yesudas, Kalabhavan Mani, Manju Warrier	3:26
5.	"Harichandana Malarile" (based on the ragam Devagandhari)	M. G. Sreekumar	4:38
6.	"Theithaaro Thaka"	Kalabhavan Mani	3:11
7.	"Kaithappoovin" (Female version)	K. S. Chithra	4:01
8.	"Poochakorumookuthi"	K. J. Yesudas, M. G. Sreekumar	5:19

== Reception ==
Jayalakshmi K from Deccan Herald wrote that "Some good songs and excellent acting make it worth your time". A critic from The New Indian Express wrote "at a time when the matriarchal system and the elevated female status it implies is the biggest joke in Kerala, this movie makes you want to stand up and cheer for those women who thumb their broken noses at the status quo".

== Accolades ==
National Film Awards

- Special Jury Award - Manju Warrier

Asianet Film Awards

- Best Actress - Manju Warrier
- Best Supporting Actor - Biju Menon
