= Vettah =

2016 film by Rajesh Pillai

- Theatrical release poster
- Directed by: Rajesh Pillai
- Written by: Arunlal Ramachandran
- Produced by: Haneef Mohammed; Rajesh Pillai
- Starring: Kunchacko Boban; Indrajith Sukumaran; Manju Warrier; Sandhya; Deepak Parambol
- Cinematography: Anishlal R S
- Edited by: Abhilash Balachandran
- Music by: Shaan Rahman
- Production company: Rajesh Pillai Films
- Distributed by: Red Rose Creations
- Release date: 26 February 2016
- Running time: 120 minutes
- Country: India
- Language: Malayalam

Vettah (English: Hunt) is a 2016 Indian Malayalam-language psychological crime thriller film directed and co-produced by Rajesh Pillai. The film stars Kunchacko Boban, Indrajith Sukumaran, Manju Warrier and Sandhya. The script was written by Arunlal Ramachandran. Anishlal R. S. handles the cinematography. The director, Rajesh Pillai, died on 27 February 2016, the day after the film was released.

== Plot ==
Commissioner Sreebala and Assistant Commissioner Xylex Abraham are tasked with investigating the disappearance of actress Uma Sathyamoorthi. The investigation leads to them arresting Melvin, who was a classmate of Uma. During the interrogation, Melvin confesses to murdering his wife Sherin and covering it up as a drug-induced suicide to take revenge on her for cheating on him. The man she had been having an affair with was Uma's boyfriend, and Melvin had planned their kidnapping and subsequent murder. However, he refuses to reveal where he had dumped their bodies.

Since they cannot make much progress in the case, Sreebala and Xylex are pulled off the investigation, but not before Melvin plants seeds of doubt in the minds of both. Sreebala comes across signs of foulplay in her father's accident, which left him in a vegetative state. She suspects Xylex had some part in the accident, and becomes wary of him. Meanwhile, Xylex grows increasingly suspicious of his wife. He secretly follows her around, and seeing her frequently with the same man confirms his suspicion. Subsequently, he kills the man and makes it look like an accident, echoing Melvin's own crime.

Melvin agrees to give up the location of his victims' corpses but insists that only Sreebala and Xylex accompany him to the spot. But when they get there, Uma and her boyfriend are well and alive. The investigation team concludes that Melvin had become deranged and paranoid following his wife's suicide. The case is wrapped up and Melvin is turned over to psychiatric care. Xylex learns that the man he had murdered – Rony and his wife had been helping Xylex's wife arrange for an adoption, keeping it as a surprise for him. Xylex's involvement in the murder becomes known to Sreebala when she receives a videotape of the accident.

The true facts of Melvin's case come to light. Sherin had not been having an affair, and her death had not been a suicide either. Melvin reveals the circumstances of her death to Sreebala and Xylex. Melvin had a daughter named Angel, who was locked up in a cage by the school's headmistress because she had failed to score good marks. Angel had died due to a panic-induced asthma attack when the headmistress had left her locked in a cage and forgot about her when the school closed. Melvin's attempts to seek justice for his daughter were cut short by the owner of the school – revealed to be the now-deceased Rony, who had used his influence to cover up the incident, and had murdered Sherin in the process. The case's investigating officer had been Sreebala's father, who had met with an accident when he got close to discovering the truth. Melvin had orchestrated the kidnapping, counting on Sreebala and Xylex joining the investigation; the former because of her father's history, and the latter because of his wife's association with Ronnie. Melvin had influenced Xylex to murder Ronnie, and in a final twist, as they drive through the forest, Sreebala accidentally runs over the headmistress who was responsible for Melvin's daughter's death. Melvin had actually avenged his family while being innocent of any actual crime.

== Cast ==
- Kunchacko Boban as Melvin Philip
- Indrajith Sukumaran as ACP Xylex Abraham IPS
- Manju Warrier as Sreebala IPS, Kochi City Police Commissioner
- Sandhya as Sherin Philip, Melvin's wife
- Rony David as CI Rajeev Kurup
- Prem Prakash as Philip Tharakan a.k.a. Appachan, Melvin's father, Sherin's father-in-law, and Angel's paternal grandfather
- Jivika Pillappa as Anu Cyril Abraham
- Sanusha as Uma Sathyamoorthi
- Mithun Ramesh as Emil
- Deepak Parambol as Rony Varghese
- Vijayaraghavan as CI Sreenivasan
- Akhil S Prasad as Jobin
- Kottayam Nazir as Sainudheen
- Sreeya Ramesh as Headmistress
- Santhosh Keezhattoor as Sunil, Security Guard
- Akshara Kishor as Angel Philip
- Baby Nandana Sajan as Sribala's daughter
- Akash Keralan
- Irshad as ADGP Bhargavan Menon
- Santhosh Krishna as SI Anil
- Krishna Prasad
- Jith Pirappancode

== Production ==
Vettah was announced by director Rajesh Pillai on 20 October. The announcement stated that Kunchacko Boban, Indrajith Sukumaran, and Manju Warrier would be the lead actors and that Bhama, Vijayaraghavan, Prem Prakash and Deepak Parambol were considered for other roles. Bhama was later replaced by Sandhya. Initially, Jayasurya was considered for the role of ACP Zylex Abraham IPS, but it was later confirmed that this character would be portrayed by Indrajith Sukumaran.

Principal photography started on 7 October at Ernakulam. The first schedule was finished by the first week of November. The second schedule started on 11 December at Punalur, Kollam.

== Critical response ==
The Times Of India gave the film 3 out of 5 and stated "Vettah can be a moderately engaging one-time watch if you walk in with reasonable expectations". Manorama Online gave the film 3 out of 5 and stated "Vettah is a one time watch for those who are looking for something fresh on screen". Filmi Beat rated the film 3 out of 5 stars saying that" Vettah is a well-crafted, unique psychological thriller, with some exceptional performances".

== Box office ==
By 6 April 2016, the film had grossed approximately ₹6.54 crore (US$680,000).

== Awards and nominations ==
Asiavision Awards – 2017

- Best Actress – Manju Warrier (shared with Karinkunnam 6S)
- Man of the Year – Kunchacko Boban (shared with Kochavva Paulo Ayyappa Coelho)

Asianet Film Awards

- Best Cinematography – Anishlal R S

Vayalar Awards

- Best Actress – Manju Warrier (shared with Karinkunnam 6S)

Vanitha Film Awards

- Best Actress – Manju Warrier (shared with Karinkunnam 6S)

NAFA 2017

- Best Actress – Manju Warrier (shared with Karinkunnam 6S)

Janmabhumi Awards

- Best Actress – Manju Warrier

2nd IIFA Utsavam

- Nominated – Best Actress – Manju Warrier

Filmfare Awards South

- Nominated – Best Lyrics – Manu Manjith
- Nominated – Best Playback Singer (Female) – Rinu Razak

SIIMA 2017

- Nominated – Best Actress – Manju Warrier

Anand TV Awards

- Best Actress – Manju Warrier
