= Prathi Poovankozhi =

2019 Indian Malayalam language thriller film

- Theatrical release poster
- Directed by: Rosshan Andrrews
- Screenplay by: Unni R.
- Based on: Sankadam by Unni R.
- Produced by: Gokulam Gopalan
- Starring: Rosshan Andrrews; Manju Warrier; Anusree
- Cinematography: G. Balamurugan
- Edited by: A. Sreekar Prasad
- Music by: Gopi Sundar
- Production company: Sree Gokulam Movies
- Distributed by: Central Pictures
- Release date: 20 December 2019
- Country: India
- Language: Malayalam

Prathi Poovankozhi (transl. Accused rooster) is a 2019 Indian Malayalam-language revenge thriller film directed by Rosshan Andrrews and written by Unni R. based on his story Sankadam. It stars Rosshan Andrrews, Manju Warrier, and Anusree in main roles. Central Pictures released the film in theaterson 20 December 2019. Boney Kapoor purchased the Tamil, Telugu, Hindi and Kannada remake rights of the movie.

== Plot ==
Madhuri is a saleswoman from one of the leading clothing stores in the city. Madhuri and her mother live on her income and sewing job. One day while going to her workplace, Madhuri gets molested in a bus by a goon. She runs behind him, but he manages to escape. She determines to payback the thug for the eve teasing. Madhuri goes in search of the teaser, named Anthappan who is currently on a hideout because of another fight that happened between him and some thugs. After a lot of searches, Madhuri finds Anthappan near a railway station. However, before Madhuri could get close Anthappan is attacked by a goon squad. Anthappan gets critically injured and Madhuri takes him to a hospital. She tells her friend that she wants Anthappan to come back to life so that she can have her revenge.

Madhuri gets to know that the goons that tried to kill Anthappan were employed by the local police inspector himself because he feared Anthappan was taking over his control over the market. In the police investigation that followed, Madhuri is framed by the inspector as the prime suspect. The police keep an eye on Madhuri in the hopes that Madhuri will manage to find Anthappan who is currently on bail and has managed to flee. The plan was that when Madhuri see Anthappan, they will kill Anthappan and blame it on Madhuri. But Madhuri manages to fool those who were following her and finds Anthappan. Anthappan has now paralyzed waist down. Anthappan's wife says to him that Madhuri helped him to get to the hospital and he is alive only because of that. Anthappan, on seeing her starts to cry out of guilt, Madhuri leaves him without a word.

Madhuri on her way back home, sees a man groping a schoolgirl on the bus. She throws him out of the bus and crushes his hand with a stone. She takes all her anger on Anthhappan, on this guy and calls him Anthappan. He says I am not Anthappan and his name is Satheesh, but Madhuri says that Anthappan and Satheesh are the same. The story ends when Madhuri walks away from the scene and the schoolgirl who got molested goes back to Satheesh and starts thrashing him.

== Cast ==
- Rosshan Andrrews as Antony "Antappan" Joseph
- Manju Warrier as Madhuri
- Anusree as Rosamma, Madhuri's friend
- Saiju Kurup as Sub Inspector Sreenath K.
- Grace Antony as Sheeba
- Alencier Ley Lopez as Gopi
- S. P. Sreekumar as Chacko
- Divya Prabha as Jolly (Antappan's wife)
- Sashikala Nedungadi as Madhuri's mother
- Sekhar Menon as Happymon, Rosamma's fiancée
- Sooraj Pops as Seban, Rossamma's Love Interest
- Chali Pala as Surendran, Madhuri's employer
- Boban Alummoodan as Vivek, Madhuri's suitor
- Jeeja Surendran as Madhuri's Neighbour
- Laya Simson as Theresa, Sales Girl
- Keerthana Poduwal as Sheela
- Trikannan

== Music ==
The Original Soundtrack of the film was composed by Gopi Sundar and The lyrics of the songs were written by Anil Panachooran.

No.	Title	Length
1.	"Eninna Enithenna"	2:40

== Reception ==
Cris of The News Minute rated the movie 2.5 out of 5 stating: "Manju gives devoted performance in a film that tells off harassers." Cris also praised the film's director Rosshan Andrrews and wrote that "Rosshan and his team do deserve a pat for delivering this message clearly. Only if they had the backing of some good writing, the film would have reached out a lot more." Padmakumar K. of Malayala Manorama rated it 3 out of 5 stars and gave the verdict: "Telling it point-blank." He concluded that "Prathi Poovankozhi may not instill a sense of integrity among probable abusers, but will sure give them a fair idea about how a woman actually feels when she is objectified." Sify awarded 3 in a scale of 5 and commented: "Topical and hits you hard!" The reviewer appreciated Manju Warrier's performance and wrote that she "performs her well written role with dedication and confidence." Sajin Shrijith of The New Indian Express gave the film a 3.5 out of 5 rating and wrote: "Manju Warrier and Rosshan Andrrews stand out in this tense thriller." Baradwaj Rangan of Film Companion South wrote " The film belongs as much to Manju Warrier and Rosshan Andrews as Unni R, the writer who adapted his short story, Sankadam.".
