= Ayisha (film) =

2023 Malayalam film

- Theatrical release poster
- Directed by: Aamir Pallikkal
- Written by: Aashif Kakkodi
- Produced by: Zakariya Mohammed
- Starring: Manju Warrier; Mona Tawil; Krishna Sankar; Radhika
- Cinematography: Vishnu Sharma
- Edited by: Appu N. Battathiri
- Music by: M. Jayachandran
- Production company: Cross Border Cinema
- Distributed by: Magic Frames; (in association with Prithviraj Productions)
- Release date: 20 January 2023
- Running time: 142 minutes
- Country: India
- Languages: Malayalam; Arabic

Ayisha is a 2023 Indian bilingual biographical film based on the life of Nilambur Ayisha, directed by Aamir Pallikkal (in his directorial debut) and produced by Zakariya Mohammed under Cross Border Cinema. The movie features Manju Warrier and Mona Tawil in lead roles, while Krishna Sankar and Radhika plays important supporting roles. It was released on 20 January 2023. The film features dialogues predominantly in Malayalam and broken Arabic and English. Upon release, the film was a disappointment at the box office.

== Plot ==
Ayisha migrates to the Gulf as a domestic worker for an elite Arab family, slowly learning all the palace etiquette. An interesting course of events leads to the development of a beautiful bond between Mama and Ayisha.

== Cast ==
- Manju Warrier as Ayisha
- Mona Tawil as Umera Nassar/ Mama
- Krishna Sankar as Abid
- Radhika as Nisha
- Latheefa as Sara
- Arwa as Salama
- Ram as Mama's police son
- JNR as Abdulla, Mama's son
- Barrah Al Nizami as Aqif
- Mini Alphonsa as Nurse
- Shamsudheen as Hamza

== Production ==
The film was shot in the Ras Al Khaimah and Kerala. The production team announced that Manju Warrier would headline the Indo-Arab film. 40 days of filming was held in the United Arab Emirates. Prabhu Deva was onboarded as choreographer for the film. The first look of the film was released in February 2023. United Arab Emirates schedule was wrapped on 10 March 2022 and the entire shooting was completed on 21 April 2022. The production company released a video song for the birthday of Manju Warrier. The film was released on 20 January 2023.

== Music ==
Track listing
No.	Title	Lyrics	Singer(s)	Length
1.	"Ayisha Ayisha"	B. K. Harinarayanan	Shreya Ghoshal	4:05
2.	"Kannilu Kannilu"	B. K. Harinarayanan	Ahi Ajayan	4:02
3.	"Masalama"	B. K. Harinarayanan; Dr. Noora AlMarzooqi	Shreya Ghoshal	3:23
4.	"Thala'al-Badru Alaina"	Traditional	Suchetha Satheesh, Chorus	1:46
5.	"De De Dil"	Manoj Yadav	Benny Dayal, Shilpa Surroch	3:28
6.	"Vadakku Dhikkile"	Suhail Koya	Manjari	2:18
Total length:				17:03

== Reception ==
Sukanya Shaji of The News Minute gave 3 stars out of 5 and stated that "Ayisha is tricky to write an opinion on". Anjana George of The Times of India wrote that "Ayisha is a beautiful, slice of life movie that brings out the struggles of an actress who broke all the barriers to chase her dreams" and gave 4 stars out of 5 and appreciated the film. A critic from India Today gave 3 out of 5 stars and stated that "The film also feels a bit dragged when Ayisha moves back to Kerala." Sajin Shrijith of The New Indian Express wrote that "Ultimately, Ayisha is a tale of resilience, and Manju exudes all the necessary strength that a story and character of this nature demand, and for that, I’m thankful." Onmanorama critic gave a mixed review.
