= Thooval Kottaram =

- Promotional poster
- Directed by: Sathyan Anthikad
- Written by: A. K. Lohithadas
- Produced by: Grihalakshmi Productions
- Starring: Jayaram; Sukanya; Manju Warrier; Dileep
- Cinematography: Vipin Mohan
- Edited by: K. Rajagopal
- Music by: Johnson
- Production company: Grihalakshmi Productions
- Distributed by: Kalpaka Films
- Release date: 23 August 1996
- Running time: 150 minutes
- Country: India
- Language: Malayalam

Thooval Kottaram (transl. Feather Palace) is a 1996 Indian Malayalam-language romantic drama film directed by Sathyan Anthikad and written by A. K. Lohithadas. It stars Jayaram, Sukanya and Manju Warrier in lead role. The music was composed by Johnson. The film won three Filmfare Awards South, was a commercial success, and ran for about 300 days in theatres. Jayaram won his first Kerala State Film Award, a Special Jury Award, for his role as Adv. Mohanachandra Poduval.

== Plot ==
Mohanachandra Poduval is a lawyer, also working as a plumber, caterer, electrical worker, driver, and Chenda player at festival programs. He is engaged to Sujatha, a music and dance teacher, who is the daughter of Achu Marar. Ravi Chandran, his younger brother, studies at a medical school. Mohanachandran is hopeful that, once his brother becomes a doctor, his financial troubles will be over. Radhakrishnan, his brother-in-law and a police constable, brings an alliance of his senior officer, a police inspector for his sister Remani, which gets almost fixed.

Things go smoothly until Devaprabha and her grandfather Rama Varma arrive in the village. Devaprabha, the heiress of the royal family, forms a strong relationship with Mohanachandran. She was suffering from depression after the death of her only brother Sudev Varma and came to the village as part of her treatment. Mohanchandran helps her become almost normal. However, Sujatha, his fiancée, finds it intolerable and complains to him. Slowly things go out of control as Devaprabha turns stubborn and possessive about Mohanachandran. One day, he flatly refuses to accompany her, adding that he doesn't want to see her.

Devaprabha again shows changes in behavior, making Rama Varma fear that her mental problems are returning. He summons his son Balarama, who is Devaprabha's father and a rich businessman in Bangalore. He proposes that she marry Mohanachandran, but Mohanachandran is unwilling. Balarama Varma approaches Achu Marar and Sujatha and asks them to leave Mohanachandran to help his daughter. Regardless, Devaprabha surprises everyone by revealing that she sees Mohanachandran as her dead brother, by calling him "Sudev".

== Cast ==
- Jayaram as Adv. Mohanachandran Pothuval (Appu)
- Sukanya as Sujatha, Mohanachandran's love interest
- Manju Warrier as Devaprabha Varma
- Dileep as Ravichandran Pothuval
- Murali as Balaraman Varma, father of Devaprabha Varma
- Oduvil Unnikrishnan as Achuthan Marar
- Babu Swamy as Ramavarma Thampuran
- Innocent as Radhakrishnan
- Lakshmi Krishnamurthy as Madhavi
- Bindu Panicker as Rama
- Mamukkoya as Moytheen Hajiyar
- Kuthiravattam Pappu as Kunjuraman Menon
- Sankaradi as Advocate
- Paravoor Ramachandran as Ramabhadran
- Sreenath as Advocate Salim
- Sona Nair as Hema
- Kozhikode Narayanan Nair
- Ramankutty Varrier As Temple Priest
- Sadiq
- Manju Satheesh as Maalu

== Soundtrack ==
The film's music was composed by Johnson and the lyrics were written by Kaithapram and Sathyan Anthikad (Thankanoopuramo). K. J. Yesudas sang most of the songs in the film. K. S. Chithra, Lekha, and Raveendran were the other singers involved.

Track	Song title	Singer(s)
1	"Sindhooram Peythirangi"	K. J. Yesudas
2	"Aadhyamay Kanda Naal"	K. J. Yesudas, K. S. Chithra
3	"Thankanoopuramo"	K. J. Yesudas
4	"Sindhooram Peythirangi"	Raveendran, Lekha R Nair, K. J. Yesudas
5	"Parvathi Manohari"	K. J. Yesudas

== Awards ==
Kerala State Film Award

- Best Male Playback Singer - K. J. Yesudas
- Second Best Actor - Oduvil Unnikrishnan
- Special Jury Award - Jayaram

Filmfare Awards South

- Best Film - Malayalam - P. V. Gangadharan
- Best Director - Malayalam - Sathyan Anthikad
- Best Actor - Malayalam - Jayaram

== Box office ==
The film was a commercial success and ran for over 300 days in theatres. It was released alongside Indraprastham and The Prince on the occasion of Onam and emerged the winner that season.
