= Kanmadam =

- Promotional poster
- Directed by: A. K. Lohithadas
- Written by: A. K. Lohithadas
- Produced by: Mohanlal
- Starring: Mohanlal; Manju Warrier; Lal
- Cinematography: Ramachandra Babu
- Edited by: A. Sreekar Prasad
- Music by: Raveendran (songs); S. P. Venkatesh (score)
- Production company: Pranavams International
- Distributed by: Pranamam Pictures
- Release date: 14 April 1998
- Running time: 162 minutes
- Country: India
- Language: Malayalam

Kanmadam (transl. Viscous rock) is a 1998 Indian Malayalam-language drama film, written and directed by A. K. Lohithadas. It stars Mohanlal, Manju Warrier and Lal while K. P. A. C. Lalitha and Siddique appear in guest roles. The songs were composed by Raveendran, while S. P. Venkatesh composed the background score, Ramachandra Babu was the cinematographer and A. Sreekar Prasad was the editor. The film was produced and distributed by Pranavams International. Kanmadam was released on 14 April 1998 on Vishu. The film received critical acclaim and was a commercial success at the box office. It completed 100 days run in theatres.

== Plot ==
A thug-turned-cab driver, Vishwanathan (Mohanlal), lives in Mumbai next to his friend Johnny (Lal), a pimp who sells unassuming women as prostitutes to a brothel. One day, while he and Johnny are driving in a cab, a man (Siddique) enters the cab and holds Vishwan at gunpoint. While driving, Johnny and Vishwam manage to disarm him, however he dies following an accident. When Vishwam checks the dead man's belongings, he discovers stolen jewellery and letters from his sister Bhanu (Manju Warrier) revealing that his name is Damodaran and his family has debts in the village and are going to lose their belongings. He decides to leave for Kerala to help them.

Meanwhile, in Kerala, Bhanu is a short-tempered blacksmith, being the sole breadwinner in her family that consists of her grandparents, an unmarried elder sister Suma with a child and a school-attending younger sister Raji. She is harassed by workers of the quarry led by Kumarettan whose tools she works on.

Vishwam arrives in Damu's village, visiting his house bringing gifts to the family. He tells the family he is a friend of Damodaran who has left for the Gulf and has tasked him to make arrangements for the family. Bhanu hears of his arrival, and being cautious of him as an unknown, tells him to leave with his presents which he does.

The next day, she is harassed again by Kumarettan and after a brief altercation Kumarettan grabs her by the arms following which she bites him in the neck. At night, Kumarettan harasses the family in front of her house which is witnessed by Vishwam.

The day after, Vishwam confronts Kumarettan at the quarry trying to persuade him to stop the abuse, following which a fight ensues where Vishwam gains the upper hand.

One day, the private debtors arrive wanting their money back stating the family had managed to pay back their bank loan. Vishwam reveals he paid it back, claiming Damu told him to do so. He also convinces the lenders to take 25,000 rupees as repayment from him in advance, getting the rest in 6 months.

At night, Bhanu confronts Vishwam telling him she knows he lied about being Damu's friend, asking him to tell the truth. He complies and Bhanu breaks down crying.

The next day, Vishwam leaves to visit his family, including his mother and stepfather. Here, it is revealed that Vishwam ran away from home after slashing his stepfather, paralysing him in the process. When he meets his family, his mother is initially overjoyed. Yet after the stepfather inquires about the visitor, she tells him to leave, saying that he is not her son. He returns to Damu's village meeting Johnny who has arrived there in search for him.

They both begin to work in the quarry and settling in the village in hopes of breaking the cycle of crime. When Johnny mentions Bhanu's attractiveness after seeing her bathe, Vishwam decides to let Bhanu know of his feelings. He waylays her the next day pretending to tell her and grabs her hands, putting a kiss on her lips following which they become lovers.

Vishwam and Johnny meanwhile clash because Vishwam fears that Johnny might retort to his old behaviour. Johnny wants to return to Mumbai. Vishwam finds out his mother has died from the newspaper and leaves for his village. He reconciles with his stepfather and performs the funeral rites. When he returns, he is shocked to find out from the grandmother that Johnny had asked for Suma's hand. He objects to the marriage, however he doesn't give any reason. When Johnny arrives with clothes for Suma, he is told by the family that Damu's consent is needed. He rages and when he finds out Vishwam has objected to the marriage, he leaves to confront Vishwam who tells him he won't let him marry Suma as he is not trustworthy. Following this, Johnny ends their friendship and joins hands with Kumarettan. They kidnap Raji and her lover in order to sell Raji. When Vishwam finds out, he beats Johnny up. When Johnny is hospitalised, Kumarettan gets the information about the brothel owner off Johnny. However, Johnny sends the quarry owner to Vishwam, telling him where the lovers are hidden. Vishwam attacks Kumarettan's group at the hideout and manages to free the lovers. After Johnny is discharged, he apologises to Damu's family and intends to leave, only for Vishwam to stop him and telling him he has to stay, resuming their friendship.

== Cast ==
- Mohanlal as Vishwanathan
- Manju Warrier as Bhanu
- Lal as Johnny
- Mala Aravindan as Swami Velayudhan
- Sreejaya as Suma
- Dhanya Menon as Raji, Bhanu's younger sister
- Siddique as Damodaran
- K. P. A. C. Lalitha as Yasodha Gopalakrishnan
- Cochin Hanifa as Shaji, a Police officer
- Antony Perumbavoor as Sandeep, Police Constable
- Vimal Raj as Kumaran
- Sarada Nair as Bhanu's grandmother
- Usharani as Raakkamma
- Srihari
- Gayathri
- Mahima as Geetha
- Ramya Salim

== Production ==
=== Casting ===
Lal played Johnny. Lal, was in his early career and had difficulty playing his character and decided to abandon the role. Lohithadas persuaded him to continue. His performance received appreciation. For the role of Muthassi, they considered several actresses, but settled on Savithri Amma, who was not an actress. Cinematographer Ramachandra Babu recalls that she had "not seen a movie filming until then, but performed excellently. She enjoyed delivering natural dialogues. It can be seen in the film that she performed like an experienced artist in the scene where she cries remembering her grandson".

=== Filming ===
The film was shot in 55 days. Filming began in February 1998 two months before the scheduled release date. Palakkad in Kerala was the main location, while some scenes were shot in Madras (now Chennai) in Tamil Nadu and Bombay (now Mumbai) in Maharashtra. The temperature was high during filming, which affected their work. Some of the crew suffered sun burn. Palakkad recorded the highest temperature in Kerala.

The screenplay was incomplete when filming began. Lohithadas wrote the scenes to be shot each day the same morning. Hence, filming often began late. Blessy served as an associate director to Lohithadas in the film. A major part of the film was shot in Kava, near Malampuzha Dam in Palakkad. Their location was a rocky area, it was difficult to set tracks for the camera trolley. They borrowed apple boxes from Merryland Studio in Thiruvananthapuram, originally used by Berta for the film Vanaprastham. Bhanu's house in the film is situated on the top of a giant rock, her workplace – a forge set was created beside it. A quarry in Palakkad was another filming location.

Due to the season, most regions were dry. It was difficult to find a beautiful place for filming the song sequences. Due to time constraints they selected a greener area inside the dried out Malampuzha reservoir. After wrapping the shoot, they went to Madras for post-production. The outdoor scenes including Mohanlal, Siddique, and Lal were shot in Bombay. They returned to Madras to shoot the remaining indoor scenes in the studio, with a few outdoor scenes. A set was created in Madras for the scene where the Bombay police assault Viswanathan inside the lock-up. Film scoring, editing and dubbing were ongoing at the same time at AVM studio. The remaining song sequences were shot in the garden inside the studio. They shifted to Thrissur, Kerala for filming the scene where Viswanathan goes to see his stepfather. They were denied permission at the planned site and switched to another location by evening where they filmed until sunrise.

== Soundtrack ==
The soundtrack consists of five songs composed by Raveendran and written by Gireesh Puthenchery. The film score was done by S. P. Venkatesh. Babu remembers that "many of the crew were not happy with the song "Manjakkiliyude" when it was first heard at the location from a recorded track sung by Raveendran. Because it did not suit the voice of Raveendran, but Yesudas with his voice made the song eternal".

Song	Singers
"Doore Karalilurukumoru"	K. J. Yesudas
"Kaathoram Kannaaram"	Sudeep Kumar, K. S. Chithra
"Manjakkiliyude"	K. J. Yesudas
"Manjakkiliyude"	Radhika Thilak
"Moovanthi Thazhvarayil"	K. J. Yesudas
"Thiruvaathira"	M. G. Sreekumar, Radhika Thilak
"Thiruvaathira"	Sudeep Kumar, Radhika Thilak

== Reception ==
The film received critical acclaim and was also a commercial success at the box office. It completed 100 days in two releasing theatres—Sangeetha (Ernakulam) and Sreekumar (Thiruvananthapuram), and had a three-week run in Bangalore.

== Accolades ==
Lal won the Kerala Film Critics Association Award for Best Supporting Actor.
