= Karinkunnam 6's =

2016 film by Deepu Karunakaran

Karinkunnam 6S
- Theatrical release poster
- Malayalam: കരിങ്കുന്നം സിക്സസ്
- Directed by: Deepu Karunakaran
- Screenplay by: Deepu Karunakaran
- Story by: Arunlal Ramachandran
- Produced by: Anil Biswas; Jayalal Menon
- Starring: Manju Warrier; Anoop Menon; Babu Antony; Sudheer Karamana; Baiju; Padmaraj Ratheesh; Sudev Nair; Jacob Gregory; Santhosh Keezhattoor; Suraj Venjaramoodu; Sreejith Ravi; Nandu; Pradeep Kottayam
- Cinematography: Jaya Krishna Gummadi
- Edited by: V. Saajan
- Music by: Rahul Raj
- Production company: Backwater Studios
- Distributed by: Magic Frames; Maasthi Release; MAX Release
- Release date: 6 July 2016 (Kerala)
- Country: India
- Language: Malayalam
- Budget

Karinkunnam 6's is a 2016 Indian Malayalam sports drama film directed by Deepu Karunakaran. The film stars an ensemble cast including Manju Warrier, Anoop Menon, Babu Antony, Baiju, Padmaraj Ratheesh, Sudev Nair, Sudheer Karamana, Santhosh Keezhattoor, Nandu, Jacob Gregory, Suraj Venjaramoodu, Sreejith Ravi and Pradeep Kottayam. The musical score and songs are composed by Rahul Raj. It was released in Kerala on 6 July 2016. The film is a tribute to Jimmy George.

== Plot ==
It's an underdog story of motivated prisoners led by Vandhana and Aby. Aby starts a Volleyball Premier League (VPL) with businessman Mukul Keshav and Kuriyachan. Aby's ego doesn't match with his colleagues. Aby gets injured and is unable to train a team for VPL. His Karinkunnam 6's team players get acquired by Kuriyachan under Golden Smashers. Vandhana fills in for Aby's passion and responsibility and attempts to regroup the team under her and Aby's banner Karinkunnam 6's but gets snatched up by Felix for Southern Warriors. Disheartened Vandhana tries to recruit a bunch of prisoners as their team through IG Haritha. The rest of the film follows how Vandhana and her band of misfits from Poojappura Central Prison are able to win VPL facing slight challenges.

== Cast ==
- Anoop Menon as Aby
- Manju Warrier as Vandhana, Aby's Wife
- Babu Antony as Douglas
- Baiju as Lalu
- Sudheer Karamana as Sasankan
- Sudev Nair as Ikru
- Jacob Gregory as Bruno
- Padmaraj Ratheesh as Mohsin
- Santhosh Keezhattoor as Vasudev
- Sreejith Ravi as Bharathan, a kind-hearted Prison Warden
- Suraj Venjaramoodu as Nelson, a ruthless and sadistic Prison Warden
- Samuthirakani as Saravanan
- Jagadish as Narayanan, Commentator
- Pradeep Kottayam as Bhasi, Vandhana's assistant
- Nandu as Ambootty
- Maniyanpilla Raju as Pillai
- Shyamaprasad as Mukul Keshav
- Vijayakumar as Pranchi
- Balaji Sarma as Satheeshan
- Manikuttan as Vishnu
- Shaji Nadeshan as Kuriyachan
- Rony David as Tomy
- Vivek Gopan as Francis, Team player
- DySP Rajkumar Rajasekharan
- Taniya Stanley as Shreya, Ikru's girlfriend
- Major Ravi as IG Thobias John IPS
- Lena as IG Haritha Krishnan IPS
- Hareesh Peradi as Santhosh, Shreya's Father
- Asottan Bombay as Kunjumon, Referee
- Bindhu Krishna as Vasudev's wife
- Ambika Mohan
- Gayathri Suresh as Photographer (cameo appearance)

== Soundtrack ==
The songs and score were composed by Rahul Raj. Vinaayak Sasikumar wrote lyrics for the songs. "Ulakathin", the first video song from the film was released by the label Muzik 247 through YouTube on 21 June 2016.

Track listing

- "Ulakathin" (Rahul Raj, Arun Alat, Joju Sebastian) - 3:17
- "Medapoompattum Chutti" (Najim Arshad) - 1:29
- "Dhadakne De" (Rahul Raj, Najim Arshad) - 2:49

== Release ==
The film was certified by the Central Board of Film Certification on 27 June 2016. Karinkunnam 6'S was released on 6 July 2016 in 49 screens in Kerala on the eve of Eid. The film clashed with the coinciding release of Shajahanum Pareekuttiyum.

=== Critical reception ===
Deepa Soman of The Times of India rated the film three out of five stars and wrote that "Karinkunnam Sixes deserves to be watched for its interesting characters, story setting and the love for sports, and can offer a good time if your expectations aren't sky high." Paresh C. Palicha of Rediff gave it two-and-a-half out of five stars and wrote, "Karinkunnam 6s may lack the depth to be a great film but it is a decent watch." O. P. Olassa of Samayam rated the film three out of five stars, commending its sports drama credentials for its era, while noting its reliance on familiar clichés.

=== Box office ===
The film made a gross collection of ₹2.1 crore (US$220,000) in three days at Kerala box office.

== Awards and nominations ==
Asiavision Awards - 2017

- Best Actress - Manju Warrier (shared with Vettah)

Asianet Film Awards

- Best Actress - Manju Warrier (shared with Vettah)

Vanitha Film Awards

- Best Actress - Manju Warrier (shared with Vettah)

NAFA 2017

- Best Actress - Manju Warrier (shared with Vettah)

Filmfare Awards South

- Nominated — Best Actress - Manju Warrier (shared with Vettah)
