= Krishnagudiyil Oru Pranayakalathu =

- DVD cover
- Directed by: Kamal
- Screenplay by: Kamal
- Story by: Ranjith
- Produced by: R. Mohan
- Starring: Jayaram; Manju Warrier; Biju Menon; Balachandra Menon; Vinaya Prasad
- Cinematography: P. Sukumar
- Edited by: K. Rajagopal
- Music by: Vidyasagar
- Production company: Shogun Films
- Distributed by: Shogun Films
- Release date: 12 September 1997
- Running time: 160 minutes
- Country: India
- Language: Malayalam

Krishnagudiyil Oru Pranayakalathu (transl. During a romantic season in Krishnagudi) is a 1997 Indian Malayalam-language romance film written and directed by Kamal, starring Jayaram, Manju Warrier, Balachandra Menon, Biju Menon, and Vinaya Prasad. The music is composed by Vidyasagar.

== Plot ==
Meenakshi, after her father's death, joins her sister, Uma, and brother-in-law, Pavithran, at Krishnagudi, a small fictional village in Andhra Pradesh as Pavithran and Uma are Army officers posted there. The jovial and amiable atmosphere brings cheer and happiness back to Meenakshi.

Giri, a family friend of Pavi, falls in love with Meenakshi, but she is not ready to accept his feelings. Akhil Chandran, Meenakshi's spoiled cousin, was supported by her father after the death of his parents. Her father always wanted her to marry Akhil. However, his extra-possessive attitude and violent behavior had created problems for her. Though she never had any soft feelings for him, Meenakshi had promised her father on his deathbed that she would marry Akhil.

Pavi and Uma now want Meenakshi to marry Giri, who is a soft-spoken and fun-loving guy. Akhil goes missing for a long time. Pavi suggests that Meenakshi should wait six months. If Akhil doesn't turn up by that time, Meenakshi should accept Giri. She agrees. She mails Akhil about her decision but does not receive any reply. Giri and Meenakshi grow close.

Suddenly, one evening, a man named Renji turns up at the quarter of Giri. Renji, a close friend of Akhil, informs Giri that Akhil has had an accident on his way to Krishnagudi and is partially paralysed. He was under Renji's care, and now Renji has to leave for the U.S. So, Akhil should be handed over to Meenakshi. Giri breaks down after hearing the news that Akhil is returning.

Giri and Jose, his roommate, take Akhil to a vacant quarter nearby and decide to take care of him, without letting Meenakshi or Pavi know. Akhil, a completely changed man, does not want to be a burden to Meenakshi and wants her to marry Giri as she had planned. After a few days, Giri is unable to take it anymore and reveals the truth to Meenakshi and Pavi.

When she learns this, Meenakshi believes it is her moral responsibility to take care of the paralysed Akhil, and she decides to leave Krishnagudi for Kerala with him. Pavi and Uma go along to drop them off in Kerala. At the last moment, from the train, Akhil, using all his power, pushes Meenakshi out, asking her to join Giri for the rest of her life.

== Cast ==
- Jayaram as Giri Menon, a railway employee. Love interest of Meenakshi
- Manju Warrier as Meenakshi, Sister of Pavi, fiancée of Akhil Chandran, Love interest of Giri
- Biju Menon as Akhil Chandran, Family friend of Pavi and Meenakshi, Fiancée of Meenakshi.
- Balachandra Menon as Pavithran, brother-in-law of Meenakshi
- Vinaya Prasad as Uma, wife of Pavi and sister of Meenakshi
- Siddique as Renji, friend of Akhil Chandran
- Jagadish as Jose, colleague, roommate, and best friend of Giri
- Narendra Prasad as Krishnankutty, Meenakshi's father
- Augustine as Gangadharan, an alcoholic colleague of Giri and Jose
- Vineeth Kumar as Balan
- Sukumari as Giri's mother
- Kavya Madhavan as Anjali (Giri's sister)
- Srividya as Mrs. Nair
- Vijayan Peringodu as Ayyappan, Giri's Uncle

== Soundtrack ==
Krishnagudiyil Oru Pranayakalathu

Soundtrack album by Vidyasagar
- Released: 15 August 1997
- Recorded: 1997
- Venue: Chennai
- Genre: Feature film soundtrack
- Language: Malayalam
- Label: Satyam Audios
External audio
- Audio Jukebox on YouTube

The songs were composed by Vidyasagar and the lyrics are penned by Girish Puthenchery. The latter received the Kerala State Film Award for Best Lyricist for the song "Pinneyum Pinneyum".

#Track	Song title	Singer(s)	Duration
01	"Pinneyum Pinneyum"	K. J. Yesudas	5:03
02	"Kaathiruppoo"	K. J. Yesudas, K. S. Chithra	4:59
03	"Vinnile"	Sujatha, M. G. Sreekumar	4:18
04	"Manju Maasa Pakshi"	Daleema	4:21
05	"Pinneyum Pinneyum" (Female)	K. S. Chithra	4:42
06	"Suvi Suvi"	Kousalya	2:08
07	"Manju Maasa Pakshi"	K. J. Yesudas	4:21
08	"Sandhramaam"	K. J. Yesudas	4:57

== Awards ==
Year	Category	Award	Recipient
1997	Kerala State Film Awards	Kerala State Film Award for Second Best Actor	Biju Menon
1997	Kerala State Film Awards	Kerala State Film Award for Best Lyricist	Girish Puthenchery
