= She Taxi =

She Taxi is a fleet of taxicabs, owned and operated by women, for transporting women commuters exclusively. The establishment of the fleet was initiated by Gender Park, an autonomous institution promoted by the Department of Social Justice, Government of Kerala State, India. The services of the fleet was launched on 19 November 2013 in Thiruvananthapuram with a fleet of five cars. ‘Safe, secure and responsible’ travel for women was the main objective of the service.
