= Udaharanam Sujatha =

- Theatrical release poster
- Directed by: Phantom Praveen
- Screenplay by: Ashwiny Iyer Tiwari; Neeraj Singh; Pranjal Choudhary; Nitesh Tiwari
- Additional screenplay: Martin Prakkat; Naveen Bhasker
- Story by: Nitesh Tiwari
- Produced by: Martin Prakkat; Joju George
- Starring: Manju Warrier; Anaswara Rajan
- Cinematography: Madhu Neelakandan
- Edited by: Mahesh Narayanan
- Music by: Gopi Sundar
- Production company: The Scene Studios
- Release date: 28 September 2017 (India)
- Country: India
- Language: Malayalam

Udaharanam Sujatha (transl. For Example, Sujatha) is a 2017 Indian Malayalam-language drama film directed by director "Phantom" Praveen (in his directorial debut) adapted by Naveen Bhaskar and produced by Martin Prakkat and Joju George. It is a remake of the 2015 Hindi-language film Nil Battey Sannata (The New Classmate), although, the theme of the film has appeared in many films like, Back to School.

The film stars Manju Warrier as a single mother living in an impoverished colony in Thiruvananthapuram doing menial jobs to support her daughter Anaswara Rajan's education. The cast also includes Anaswara Rajan and Mamta Mohandas. Principal photography began on 4 May 2017 and was completed exclusively in Thiruvananthapuram. Madhu Neelakandan handles cinematography. Gopi Sunder is the music director. The film has seven songs, including one promo song sung by V. Suresh Thampanoor.

The film released in India on 28 September 2017 and was a box office success. It received positive reviews from critics and audiences alike and won a number of accolades.

== Plot ==
Sujatha Krishnan is a high-school drop-out, a young widow and a single mother living in the city of Thiruvananthapuram. She lives to see her daughter Athira's academic success, taking up more and more trivial jobs at apartments and factories to support her schooling (and the planned expensive "private coaching" for SSLC). Her daughter, though, is far from grateful. She is unmotivated, never studies properly, gets low marks in her school exams and won't quit believing that she can't be anything more than a petty "domestic help" like her mother.

Sujatha narrates her dilemma to her rich employer George Paul. A kind and open-hearted man, he tells Sujatha about an uncanny solution to her daughter's poor academic performance. Under the new plan, Sujatha will enrol in her daughter's school so that she can learn math and tutor Athira herself. This embarrasses Athira. Sujatha slowly starts impressing her classmates and scores pretty much well in maths exams. No one, except for the school's kind principal, is aware of Sujatha's relationship to Athira. Athira begs Sujatha to stop attending the school. She is angered by Sujatha's success in math, as she herself continues to fail to understand it. Both of them start a rivalry where if Athira scores more marks than Sujatha, then she should leave school. Athira, seeing no other solution but to score better than Sujatha, starts studying well. She scores a "personal" record 58% marks in her next mathematics exam. Sujatha is happy, and leaves school.

Sujatha, being naïve, decides to meet the District Collector Deepa to plan her daughter's academic future. She somehow manages to get into collector's residence and tells the Collector about her dream to see Athira as a District Collector. The Collector - much to the surprise of Sujatha - tells her that she herself came from a very low income family and couldn't afford to go to expensive private "coaching classes" for Civil Service Exams.

Sujatha soon discovers that Athira only scored good marks in the last series of exams because she didn't want to attend classes with Sujatha. Determined to change her, Sujatha again starts attending the school. Sujatha now starts taking more and more jobs, works late into the night in small restaurants, and saves more and more money for Athira (and to pay out her family debts). One day, Sujatha finds out that Athira has stolen her savings to buy expensive school bags, slippers and dress. Sujatha gets humiliated by the landlady Thulasi to whom she owes money. Athira suspects that Sujatha is earning money by prostitution. The relation between the mother and daughter reaches an all-time low.

While going to work, Sujatha meets with a road accident and is severely wounded. In the hospital, Athira gets to know from her friend Rajeev that Sujatha is not doing any prostitution but she is working day and night in a small restaurant in the city. Athira visits Sujatha in the hospital and asks for forgiveness and vows to "study hard from now on".

After realising her mistakes, Athira passes the (SSLC) exams with good marks, along with Sujatha, and she eventually fulfils her mother's dream by becoming a District Collector. After being asked what inspired her to apply for the Administrative Service, she answers that she is inspired by her mother, who now tutors economically backward students for free.

== Cast ==
- Manju Warrier as Sujatha Krishnan, Athira's mother
- Anaswara Rajan as Athira Krishnan, Sujatha's daughter
  - Aditi Ravi as Adult Athira Krishnan (IAS)(Cameo)
- Mamta Mohandas as Deepa.M, District Collector (Thiruvananthapuram)
- Nedumudi Venu as George Paul, Malayalam Script Writer
- Joju George as Headmaster Sreekumar "Kuthira"
- Abhija Sivakala as Thulasi
- Sudhi Koppa as Jayan
- V. Suresh Thampanoor as Auto Driver
- Alencier Ley Lopez as P.C. Cheriyan
- Swaraj Gramika as Rajeev
- Lukman Avaran as Rajeev's elder brother
- Jikku Chacko as Malayalam Teacher

== Critical reception ==
The film released in Kerala to positive reviews from the critics. Ashwiny Iyer Tiwari, director of Nil Battey Sannata, the original 2015 film on which Udaharanam Sujatha was based, tweeted that she loved the film and praised the songs.

Malayalam Manorama describes, "Manju Warrier and Anaswara Rajan together have captured the authenticity of the characters with the story-line's intensity, the warmth of mother-daughter love that culminates is the grand catharsis. Nedumudi Venu as scriptwriter George Paul and Joju George as school headmaster with de-glam avatars do justice to their roles by getting into the skin of the character as the story progresses. [Phantom] Praveen have pitched the characters on the right spot with moderation throughout the story."

Times of India noted the film to be "an interesting story, good performances, music and subtle humour, all of which merit your time in the theatre. Not everyone would be proud of their kids following their footsteps, especially parents belonging to the lower-middle class section of the society. They dream big, so that at least their kids don't end up struggling, doing low-paying jobs like them. The film portrays this fact well, through the performances of its lead actors, Manju Warrier and Anaswara Rajan.".
