= Rani Padmini (film) =

2015 film by Aashiq Abu

- Theatrical release poster
- Directed by: Aashiq Abu
- Written by: Ravisankar; Syam Pushkaran
- Produced by: P. M. Harris; V. S. Muhammed Althaf; Mohammed Kassim (co-producer); P. V. Sasi (co-producer)
- Starring: Rima Kallingal; Manju Warrier; Srinda Ashab; Sajitha Madathil
- Cinematography: Madhu Neelakandan
- Edited by: Saiju Sreedharan
- Music by: Bijibal
- Production company: Fort Entertainment
- Release date: 23 October 2015
- Country: India
- Language: Malayalam

Rani Padmini is a 2015 Indian Malayalam film directed by Aashiq Abu, starring Manju Warrier and Rima Kallingal in the lead. Produced by the company Fort Entertainment. The script was written by Syam Pushkaran and Ravisankar . The music score was composed by Bijibal. It is a portrayal of the journey towards the amative awakening of two women from different backgrounds with a blend of feminism. The film pays homage to Narendra Prasad. It was released on 23 October 2015.

== Plot ==
Padmini (Manju Warrier), a traditional married woman, goes to Manali, Himachal Pradesh to meet her car rallying driver husband Giri (Jinu Joseph) to resolve a personal conflict. Rani, (Rima Kallingal) is a tomboy brought up in North India. She is running away from a wanted criminal, Raja, who has posed a threat to her life. Rani and Padmini meet on a bus and a memorable journey starts with the pleasantness of simple interpersonal relations. Together they try to find Giri while simultaneously trying to evade capture by Raja's gang.

== Cast ==
- Manju Warrier as Padmini
  - Theertha Vinod as Young Padmini
- Rima Kallingal as Rani
  - Ivana as Young Rani
- Jinu Joseph as Giri
- Sajitha Madathil as Lalithamma
- Dileesh Pothan as Ullas Menon
- Sreenath Bhasi as Trekker
- Sandeep Narayanan as Hulk
- Soubin Shahir as Madan
- Sooraj Harris as Sharukh Khan
- Binu Pappu as Kareem
- Kunchan as Shankaran Vaidyar
- Ambika Mohan as Padmini's mother
- Srinda as Nandhini
- Sana Althaf as Trekker
- Vivek Bhaskar as Rana Sherghill
- Subbalakshmi as Rani's grandmother/Suresh

== Production ==
The official launch of the film was held at a function in Kochi on 14 April 2015. Filmmakers Lal Jose, Anwar Rasheed, and Sameer Thahir were present at the function along with actors Shekhar Menon, Sana Althaf, Maqbool Salmaan, and Siddique. Talking about the subject in an interview, actress Manju said that many would consider it as a women's empowerment movie with two female in the lead, it is not. "It is a visual treat with a lot of humor in a feminine tone and celebration of all-rounder aspect of women's capability, who can care, comfort and in even dire situations be a guiding force".

Apart from Kerala, the film was shot extensively in Kashmir Valley, Himachal Pradesh, and Delhi. The first look poster was released on 23 July. The first official trailer released on 9 October.

== Critical reception ==
Veeyen of Nowrunning.com wrote that "Aashiq Abu's go-girl tour-de-force is syrupy without ever being saccharine and tugging without ever being overwhelming. It's a film with the actress' proofed script for re-entry and strengthening of yesteryear female leads in Mollywood. It is intriguing with retrospection, and bolstered by a sharp planning and a helms a scrupulous director that can strike chords of the heart." Paresh C Palicha of Rediff.com stated that the film is an entertainer, and that "director Aashiq Abu takes up the gamble of making a film with no male superstar."

== Box office ==
The film collected ₹38 lakh (US$41,000) on its first day of release and collected ₹1.66 crores within four days. It grossed ₹2.85 crore (US$300,000) in 14 days.

== Music ==
Rani Padmini

Film score by Bijibal
- Released: 14 October 2015
- Genre: Film soundtrack
- Label: Muzik 247
- Producer: Bijibal

Bijibal chronology
Amar Akbar Anthony (2015)	Rani Padmini (2015)	Salt Mango Tree (2015)

The songs were released by the music label Muzik 247 on 14 October. Featuring four tracks, the music was composed by Bijibal with lyrics written by Rafeeq Ahammed and Nellai Jayantha ("Puthu Puthu").

The first video song titled "Varu Pokaam Parakkaam" was released on 28 September. The song features childhood of Rani and Padmini.

Track	Title	Singer (s)	Lyrics	Duration
1	"Varu Pokaam Parakkaam"	Shweta Menon, Devdutt, Lola	Rafeeq Ahammed	4.22
2	"Oru Makaranilavay"	Chithra Arun	Rafeeq Ahammed	3.35
3	"Puthu Puthu"	Soumya Ramakrishnan	Nellai Jayantha	2.16
4	"Mizhimalarukal"	Sayanora	Rafeeq Ahammed	5.05

== Awards ==
Vanitha Film Awards

- Special Performance (female) - Rima Kallingal

5th South Indian International Movie Awards

- Nominated - Best Actress in a Supporting Role - Rima Kallingal
- Nominated - Best Music Director - Bijipal

63rd Filmfare Awards South

- Nominated - Best Actress - Manju Warrier
- Nominated - Best Playback Singer Female - Chitra Arun - "Oru Makaranilavay"
