= Sathyan Anthikad filmography =

Sathyan Anthikad is an Indian film director, screenwriter, and lyricist who predominantly works in Malayalam cinema. In a career spanning five decades he has directed more than 50 films, been the lyricist for 12 films and been the scriptwriter for 7 films.

Sathyan has created many critical and commercially successful films, especially when working with Sreenivasan as the scriptwriter. Sathyan made his debut with the 1982 film Kurukkante Kalyanam. The following is a complete list of works by Sathyan Anthikad.

== Films ==
=== As director ===
Year	Title	Writer	Notes
1982	Kurukkante Kalyanam	P. Balakrishnan	
1983	Kinnaram	P. Balakrishnan	
1983	Mandanmmar Londonil	P. Balakrishnan	
1984	Veruthe Oru Pinakkam	P. Balakrishnan	
1984	Appunni	V. K. N.	
1984	Kaliyil Alpam Karyam	P. Balakrishnan	
1984	Aduthaduthu	John Paul	
1985	Adhyayam Onnu Muthal	John Paul	
1985	Gaayathridevi Ente Amma	Venu Nagavally	
1986	Pappan Priyappetta Pappan	Siddique–Lal	
1986	T. P. Balagopalan M.A.	Sreenivasan	
1986	Revathikkoru Pavakkutty	John Paul	
1986	Gandhinagar 2nd Street	Sreenivasan	
1986	Sanmanassullavarkku Samadhanam	Sreenivasan	
1987	Sreedharante Onnam Thirumurivu	Sreenivasan	
1987	Nadodikkattu	Sreenivasan	
1988	Kudumbapuranam	A. K. Lohithadas	
1988	Pattanapravesham	Sreenivasan	
1988	Ponmuttayidunna Tharavu	Sreenivasan	
1989	Varavelpu	Sreenivasan	
1989	Artham	Venu Nagavally	
1989	Lal Americayil	Cochin Haneefa	
1989	Mazhavilkavadi	Raghunath Paleri	
1990	Sasneham	A. K. Lohithadas	
1990	Kalikkalam	S. N. Swamy	25th Film
1990	Thalayanamanthram	Sreenivasan	
1991	Ennum Nanmakal	Raghunath Paleri	
1991	Kanalkkattu	A. K. Lohithadas	
1991	Sandhesam	Sreenivasan	
1992	Snehasagaram	J. Pallassery	
1992	My Dear Muthachan	Sreenivasan	
1993	Samooham	J. Pallassery	
1993	Golanthara Vartha	Sreenivasan	
1994	Pingami	Raghunath Paleri	
1994	Santhanagopalam	Raghunath Paleri	
1995	No. 1 Snehatheeram Bangalore North	Fazil	
1996	Thooval Kottaram	A. K. Lohithadas	
1997	Irattakuttikalude Achan	Sreenivasan	
1997	Oral Mathram	S. N. Swamy	
1999	Veendum Chila Veettukaryangal	A. K. Lohithadas	
2000	Kochu Kochu Santhoshangal	Yes	
2001	Narendran Makan Jayakanthan Vaka	Sreenivasan	
2002	Yathrakarude Sradhakku	Sreenivasan	
2003	Manassinakkare	Ranjan Pramod	
2005	Achuvinte Amma	Ranjan Pramod	
2006	Rasathanthram	Yes	
2007	Vinodayathra	Yes	
2008	Innathe Chintha Vishayam	Yes	
2009	Bhagyadevatha	Yes	
2010	Kadha Thudarunnu	Yes	50th Film
2011	Snehaveedu	Yes	
2012	Puthiya Theerangal	Benny P. Nayarambalam	
2013	Oru Indian Pranayakadha	Iqbal Kuttippuram	
2015	Ennum Eppozhum	Ranjan Pramod	
2017	Jomonte Suvisheshangal	Iqbal Kuttippuram	
2018	Njan Prakashan	Sreenivasan	
2022	Makal	Iqbal Kuttippuram	
2025	Hridayapoorvam	Sonu T.P	
TBA	L-Sathyan Anthikad Project †	TBA	

=== As assistant director ===
Year	Movie	Director
1979	Agniparvatham	P. Chandrakumar
1980	Adhikaram	P. Chandrakumar
1980	Kaavalmaadam	P. Chandrakumar
1980	Ithile Vannavar	P. Chandrakumar
1980	Deepam	P. Chandrakumar
1981	Kaattu Kallan	P. Chandrakumar
1981	Aarathi	P. Chandrakumar
1982	Aayudham	P. Chandrakumar

=== Story Credits ===
Year	Movie	Director	Notes
1986	T. P. Balagopalan M. A.	Himself	Story Credits
1986	Gandhinagar 2nd Street	Himself	Story Credits
1986	Sanmanassullavarkku Samadhanam	Himself	Story Credits
1987	Sreedharante Onnam Thirumurivu	Himself	Story Credits
1988	Annanagar Mudhal Theru	Balu Anand	remake of Gandhinagar 2nd Street; story credits

=== As lyricist ===
Year	Film	Song	Composer
1976	Sindooram	Oru Nimisham Tharoo Ninnilaliyan	A.T. Ummer
1977	Saritha	Pooveyil mayangum ponnushashin	Shyam
1979	Agni Vyooham	Yaminee Neeyunaroo	A.T. Ummer
1979	Choola	Tharake Mizhiyithalil Kanneerumayi	Raveendran
1981	Dhruvasangamam	Manasa Devi	Raveendran
1981	Dhruvasangamam	Sharathkaala Megham	Raveendran
1981	Thadavara	kaattum ee kadinte kulirum	A.T. Ummer
1981	Thadavara	Aananda raagamezhuthiya	A.T. Ummer
1981	Thadavara	Nee maayalle	A.T. Ummer
1982	Njan Ekananu	O Mridule	M.G. Radhakrishnan
1982	Njan Ekananu	Pranaya Vasantham Thaliraniyumbol	M.G. Radhakrishnan
1984	Kaliyil Alpam Karyam	Kannodu Kannaya Swapnangal	Raveendran
1984	Kaliyil Alpam Karyam	Manatharil Ennum	Raveendran
1984	Veruthe Oru Pinakkam	Manasse Ninte Maninoopurangal	Raveendran
1984	Aduthaduthu	Aalolam Chanchadum	Raveendran
1984	Aduthaduthu	Illikkadum Chellakkattum	Raveendran
1996	Thooval Kottaram	Thanka Noopuramo	Johnson
1996	Veendum Chila Veettukaryangal	Viswam Kakkunna Nadha	Johnson
