= Maha Subair =

Indian film producer

- Born: Subair Pareed; Kerala, India
- Occupation: Film producer
- Years active: 2002 - present
- Notable work: Meesa Madhavan; Manassinakkare; Thirakkatha; Christian Brothers
- Awards: National Film Award for Best Feature Film in Malayalam; Kerala State Film Award for Best Film; Filmfare Award for Best Film – Malayalam; Vanitha Film Award for Best Film

Maha Subair, born Subair Pareed, is an Indian film producer, predominantly working in Malayalam films. He is associated with Varna Chithra and has produced a number of films such as Meesa Madhavan, Manassinakkare, Thirakkatha, Christian Brothers.Meesa Madhavan was highest grossing Malayalam film in 2002.

== Filmography ==
Year	Title	Director	Notes
2002	Meesa Madhavan	Lal Jose	
2003	Manassinakkare	Sathyan Anthikkad	
2003	Pattalam	Lal Jose	
2005	Udayon	Bhadran	
2007	Speed Track	S.L. Puram Jayasurya	
2008	Thirakkatha	Ranjith	
2009	Paleri Manikyam: Oru Pathirakolapathakathinte Katha	Ranjith	
2010	Penpattanam	V. M. Vinu	
2011	Christian Brothers	Joshiy	
2012	Mr. Marumakan	Sandhya Mohan	
2013	Rose Guitarinaal	Ranjan Pramod	
2014	Salaam Kashmier	Joshiy	
2017	Aakashamittayee	Samuthirakani & M. Padmakumar	
2018	Drama	Ranjith	
2023	Kurukkan	Jayalal Divakaran	
2023	Qurbani	Geo.V	
2025	Oru Jaathi Jathakam	M. Mohanan	
2026	Law and Order	Ranjith	

== Awards and honours ==
Award	Year	Film	Reference
National Film Award for Best Feature Film in Malayalam	2008	Thirakkatha	
Kerala State Film Award for Best Film	2009	Paleri Manikyam	
Kerala Film Critics Award for Popular Film	2002	Meesa Madhavan	
Filmfare Award for Best Film – Malayalam	2003	Manassinakkare	
Filmfare Award for Best Film – Malayalam	2008	Thirakkatha	
Vanitha Film Award for Best Film	2003	Manassinakkare	
Vanitha Film Award for Best Film	2008	Thirakkatha	

== See also ==
- Antony Perumbavoor
- P. K. R. Pillai
- G.P. Vijayakumar
