= Vishal Krishna (child actor) =

Indian child actor

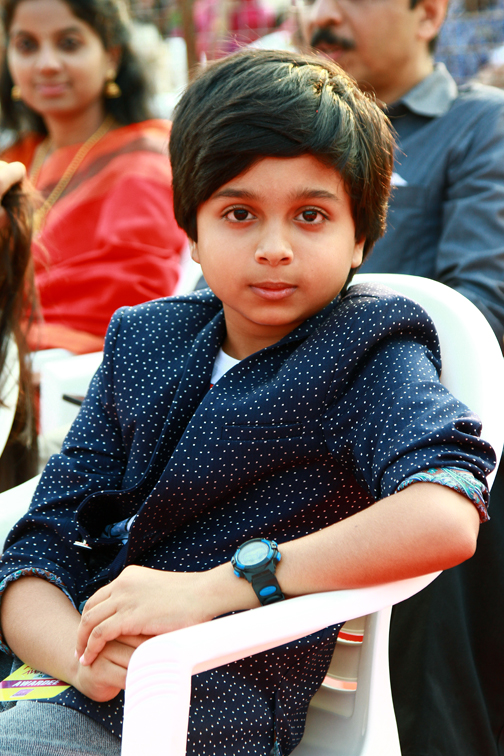
- Born: 5 October 2004 (age 21)
- Occupation: Child artist
- Years active: 2016–present
- Parents: Sunil. K.R (father); Ambika. K.P (mother)

Master Vishal Krishna (born 5 October 2004) is an Indian former child actor in the Malayalam film Industry. Vishal made his debut in Maalgudi Days (2015), in which he played the role of a 9-year-old boy named Milan. He won Best Child Artist at the 2015 Kerala Film Critics Association Awards 2015.

In 2016, he took part in the Movie named Annmariya Kalippilaanu directed by Midhun Manuel Thomas. In 2017 he played the role of Eric in Ranjan Pramod's Rakshadhikari Baiju Oppu and portrayed Sethumadhavan as a child in Sajid Yahiya's Mohanlal starring Manju Warrier and Indrajith Sukumaran.

== Personal life ==
Vishal was born on 5 October 2004 to Sunil K.R and Ambika K.P in Vyttila, Kerala. He attended Chinmaya Vidyalaya, Tripunithura. He is currently pursuing his BTech in Mechanical Engineering at College of Engineering, Trivandrum.

== Filmography ==
Year	Title	Role
2015	Maalgudi Days	Milan
2015	Ben	Ben's friend
2016	Annmariya Kalippilaanu	Avinash
2017	Rakshadhikari Baiju Oppu	Rithik
2018	Mohanlal	Sethu
2019	Nine	Albert (Albi)

== Awards ==
- Best child artist - Kerala Film Critics Association Awards 2015.
