= College of Engineering, Trivandrum =

Government Engineering College in Thiruvananthapuram

College of Engineering Trivandrum
- Motto: Karma jyāyohyakarmaņah "Action is superior to inaction" (Bhagavad Gita 3:8)"
- Type: Government College
- Established: 3 July 1939; 87 years ago
- Affiliations: Universities (Since 1939): 1. APJ Abdul Kalam Technological University (Since 2015); 2. University of Kerala (1957-2015); 3. University of Travancore (1939-1957)
- Dean: Jisha V R (UG); Lekshmi A (PG); Sumesh Divakaran (Research); Haris P A (International Affairs)
- Principal: Suresh K
- Faculty: 400
- Undergraduates: B.Tech - 2830; B. Arch- 210
- Postgraduates: M. Tech - 787; M. Arch - 104; MCA - 120; MBA -237
- Doctoral students: Engineering : 151 (FT) & 105 (PT); Management : 9 (FT) & 16 (PT)
- Location: Thiruvananthapuram, Kerala, 695016, India; 8°32′45″N 76°54′22.5″E
- Campus: 80 acres (320,000 m^{2})
- Language: English
- Acronym: CET
- Website: www.cet.ac.in

The College of Engineering Trivandrum, commonly shortened to CET, is an engineering college in the Indian state of Kerala, situated in Thiruvananthapuram. Founded in 1939 by the Travancore monarch Chithira Thirunal, it is the state's oldest technical institution. It currently offers undergraduate, graduate and research programs in eight branches of engineering and has been affiliated to the APJ Abdul Kalam Technological University since 2015, prior to which it was part of the University of Kerala.

== History ==
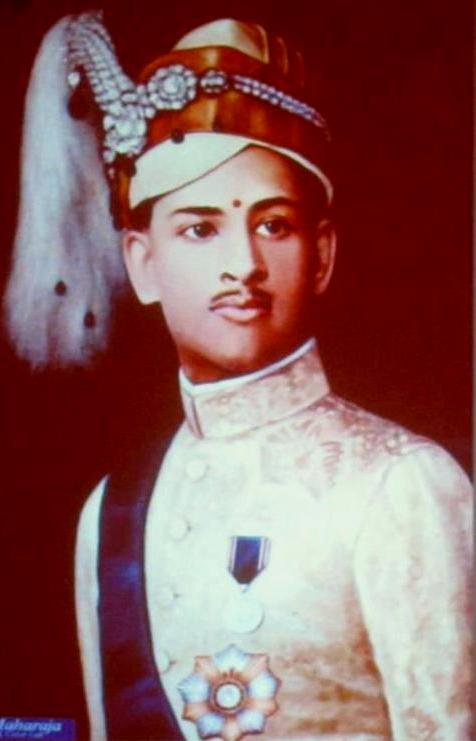
The Founder of the College of Engineering- Sree Chithira Thirunal

On 3 July 1939, the college formally came into existence. The institution owes its foundation to the vision of the Maharajah of Travancore, Sree Chitra Tirunal Balarama Varma. It initially started functioning in the former office and bungalow of the Chief Engineer (which is now the office of the Postmaster General (PMG)). Maj. T. H. Mathewman was appointed as the first principal of the college with Vastuvidya Kushala Sri, Balakrishna Rao and Prof. D. L. Deshpande on the faculty. The college had an intake of 21 students each for the Degree courses in Civil, Mechanical and Electrical branches of Engineering, under the then Travancore University. With the establishment of the Directorate of Technical Education in the late 1950s, the college administration came under the direct control of the government. In 1960, the college was shifted to its present 101 hectare or 250 acre campus at Kulathoor. The undergraduate and postgraduate courses are accredited by AICTE. The college has a library, a central computing facility and a planetarium.

== General information ==
The college was established on 3 July 1939 as a part of the erstwhile University of Travancore, Kerala, India.

The college campus is situated in Kulathoor near Sreekariyam, 13 km from Thiruvananthapuram Central (railway station), extending over 80 acres of land. The Masterplan of the campus, and the main building and other structures in the campus were designed by Prof. Joseph. Chandra Alexander, who was the first Chief Architect and Chief Town planner of the Govt. of Kerala. He was also instrumental in starting the first Architectural education centre of the state in this college.

Main Block, College of Engineering Trivandrum.

The main building resembles a spanner from the air, around which are spread the departmental buildings, library block, laboratories, workshops, hostels, a planetarium, staff quarters, canteens and stadiums.

Regular BTech admissions to this college are based on All Kerala Engineering Entrance Examination. and MTech, based on GATE examination. Besides the regular BTech, BArch, MTech, M.Plan, MBA and MCA programmes, the college also conducts Part Time BTech and MTech classes for diploma holders. There is Lateral Entry Scheme to admit diploma holders to the second year/third semester of the BTech courses to acquire a degree in engineering based on a state-level entrance examination.

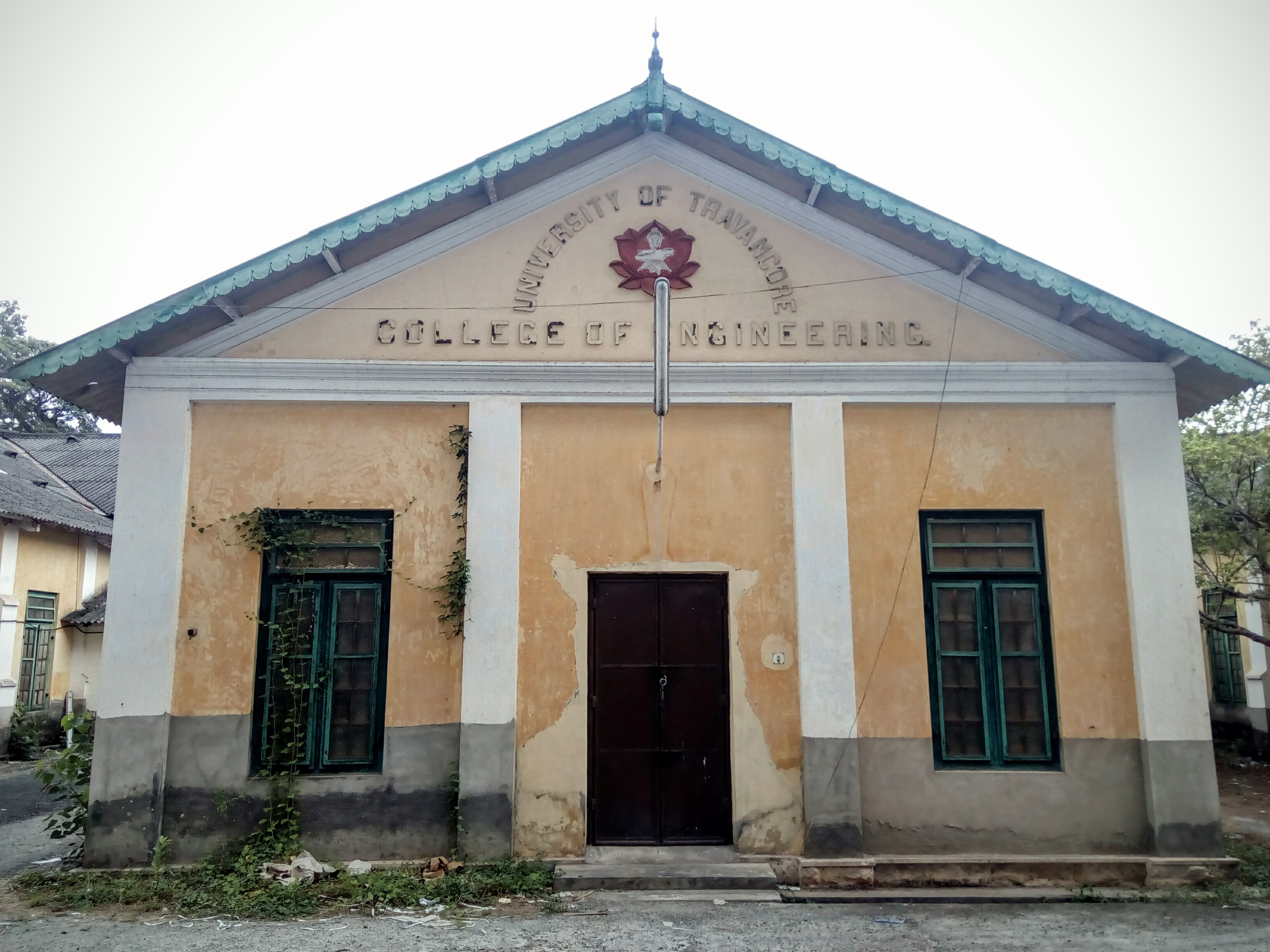
CET Old campus Main Building

There was a proposal to convert CET to a Centre of Excellence, upgrading it to 'Kerala Institute of Technology (KIT)', so that a technical university can grow around it, but the plan was later dropped to form a new separate single university for all engineering colleges in the state, named KTU.

The college has a student community running various technical, cultural inter and intra-collegiate festivals, such as 'Demo Week', where final year students dress up according to different themes.

CET over the years (An image from College Library)

On 15 February 2023, the 83 year old College of Engineering Trivandrum (CET) became the first State-run college to extend its campus hours till night. Even though the class hours from 9 am to 4 pm remained unchanged, the students benefited through unhindered access to the libraries and laboratories for research activities from 9 am to 9 pm, nearly doubling the previous working hours.

== Notable alumni ==
- S. Krishna Kumar – Former Union Minister, Government of India
- G. Madhavan Nair – Former chairman of ISRO and Secretary to the Department of Space, Government of India.
- D. Babu Paul – Bureaucrat and Author
- V. R. Lalithambika – director, directorate of Human Space Program, Indian Space Research Organisation (ISRO)
- Hashir Mohamed, Malayalam Film writer
- Jayaraj – Film director National award winner
- Joy Vazhayil IAS - Chief Secretary, Govt. of Kerala
- M. P. Parameswaran – Nuclear scientist, now full-time activist with the Kerala Sastra Sahitya Parishad.
- Mini Shaji Thomas, former director, Indian Institute of Information Technology, Tiruchirappalli
- Anand – Malayalam fiction writer and essayist
- Venu Nagavally – Film actor, director and writer
- G. Shankar – An architect from Kerala
- Alexis Leon – is an Indian software consultant
- T. G. Mohandas – Orator, writer and critic
- K. S. Sabarinathan – Former MLA of the Kerala Legislative Assembly- Aruvikara and INC leader
- Eugene Pandala – Architect known for building with environmental sustainability
- M. Jayachandran – Music Director and singer, National Award winner
- Erickavu N. Sunil - A-Grade Mridangam Artist & Author
- Manoj Vasudevan – An International speaker, author, consultant and coach.
- Basil Joseph – Film director and actor
- Soumya Sadanandan – Film director and TV anchor
- Unimaya Prasad – Film actor, kerala state award winner
- Vishal Krishna – child actor
