= Naran (film) =

- 100 days poster
- Directed by: Joshiy
- Written by: Ranjan Pramod
- Produced by: Antony Perumbavoor
- Starring: Mohanlal; Madhu; Siddique; Innocent; Jagathy Sreekumar
- Cinematography: Shaji Kumar
- Edited by: Ranjan Abraham
- Music by: Deepak Dev (Songs); Ouseppachan (Score)
- Production company: Aashirvad Cinemas
- Distributed by: Central Pictures
- Release date: 3 September 2005
- Running time: 168 minutes
- Country: India
- Language: Malayalam

Naran (transl. Man) is a 2005 Indian Malayalam-language action thriller film directed by Joshiy and written by Ranjan Pramod. The film tells the story of Velayudhan (Mohanlal), a sincere and tough homeless ruffian who exercise control over the Mullankolly village to maintain order with his code of conduct. Produced by Antony Perumbavoor through Aashirvad Cinemas, it also features Madhu, Siddique, Jagathy Sreekumar, Innocent, Bhavana, Devayani, Mamukoya, and Maniyanpilla Raju in supporting roles.

The film features original songs composed by Deepak Dev and background score by Ouseppachan. Naran was released in Kerala on 3 September 2005 prior to Onam. The film became the third highest-grossing film of the year behind Rajamanikyam and Udayananu Tharam.

== Plot ==
Mullankolli is a rustic remote village in Wayanad district of northern Kerala. Velayudhan is an orphan whose pregnant mother had come floating during heavy floods years ago, and was brought up by a kind feudal landlord named Puthusseri Valiya Nambiar. Velayudhan grows up into a kind-hearted local goon who hates injustice and has set his own rules for the villagers who are scared of him including local moneylender and panchayat's member Kurup and Valiya Nambiar's son-in-law Gopinath Nambiar, who wants to rule over the village in his own way. When Velayudhan plants a stick or rod, it means that it has his stamp of authority. The only men he listens to are Valiya Nambiar and Kelappan, who looked after him as a child.

The villagers including Kurup and Gopinathan regularly bring goons from outside the village to fight Velayudhan but to no avail. Velayudham meets three women in his life - a prostitute Kunnummel Shantha, his childhood crush Janaki and Kelappan's daughter Leela. Janaki's husband Krishnan, who runs a PDS store and is a heavy drinker, hates Velayudhan as he was Janaki's childhood crush. Gopinathan has his eyes over Janaki as well and Velayudhan despite knowing Gopi's true colors doesn't harm him solely due to his respect towards Gopi's wife Sunanda and Valiya Nambiar's daughter. During the annual temple festival in the village, Kurupp accepts donations from most of the villagers, where he hires goons from Mattanchery to fight Velayudhan.

Just before their fight, Gopi gives them extra payment to stab Velayudhan in the dark. However, all their efforts end in vain and all of them are beaten up by Velayudhan shortly before Velayudhan gets arrested by the police for the same. Later the SI lets him free after learning of his innocence from an elderly constable. Soon, the monsoon season arrives and Velayudhan gets engaged in his routine adventure of getting hold of articles (including large tree trunks) which come flowing with the stream water as part of the floods. Assisted by Kelappan and boat man Ahmed, Velayudhan is trying to get hold of a fast-flowing tree log when Hamsa, a goon hired by Gopi, cuts off the hanging rope tied to a tree using which Velayudhan balances himself and also gets hold of objects.

However Velayudhan spots him shortly where he manages to get hold of his target log and ties it to an adjacent tree. Velayudhan thrashes Hamsa and breaks his teeth in front of Gopi and Kurup to issue them a warning. Velayudhan is planning to bring in a marriage proposal for Leela. Kelappan's wife Narayani who hated Velayudhan starts treating him well when she realises his love for the family. However, the proposal fails as Gopi's men spread rumour that Velayudhan has illicit relationships with Kelappan's daughters, a lie invented by Gopi via Kurup. Velayudhan is angered and beats up Gopi's men for creating troubles to Kelappan and his family. However, Kelappan asks Velayudhan to stop his act and even slaps him in public before asking him to get out of his house forever.

A heartbroken Velayudhan goes to Gopi's house and condemns his cowardly ways. Realising his innocence, Valiya Nambiar meets him and tells him to marry Leela as according to him that is the only way to save her name. Valiya Nambiar tells Kelappan about Velayudhan's innocence. However, Leela dislikes Velayudhan and decides to commit suicide to escape from the marriage. While attempting to jump off from a cliff, she is stopped by Velayudhan who assures that he isn't interested in marrying her. The next day, Valiya Nambiar makes Velayudhan to promise Leela and Kelappan that he will never drink or beat anyone again. That night, Velayudhan narrates about his embarrassing childhood and also his love for Janaki to Ahmed, who feels sorry for him and gives him shelter. However, the next morning Ahmed arrives to see Velayudhan beaten up badly in his sleep, by the village goons.

Ahmed informs this to Valiya Nambiar, who feels guilty as Velayudhan kept his promise of not beating anyone. Some of the villagers even sympathize with Velayudhan after the incident. In the absence of Velayudhan, goons cause mayhem in the village and everyone realises how much Velayudhan's absence has affected the village. Later, Gopi asks his henchman Keeri Raghavan to provide necessary food items to Janaki as an attempt to earn her respect. Despite Janaki turning the offer down, Krishnan (who is regretful of his actions towards his wife) confronts Keeri at the local toddy shop and gets beaten up by Keeri. In the chaos, Krishnan is inadvertently stabbed by Keeri using a glass bottle and flees after understanding the danger. Gopi shelters Keeri at his home, but also cunningly informs the police about his hideout thereby getting him arrested.

Later, Gopi also gets hold of documents under the chit fund scheme headed by Kurup, who later understands that he has been duped but can't do anything to resist. Valiya Nambiar understands Gopi's intentions and apologises to Velayudhan for making him promise that he won't beat anyone. However, the next day, Valiya Nambiar dies apparently due to a heart attack and his death is mourned by the entire village, including Velayudhan. Hamsa provokes him into fixing a fight after his limbs rejuvenate. However, Velayudhan plants his walking stick and silences Hamsa. The entire village wants Velayudhan back in power. Despite heavy rains in the village, Velayudhan plans to carry out his usual river adventure with bandaged limbs much to the fear of Ahmed and Kelappan and sets out to get hold of a log in the river, where he somehow ties himself after which Kelappan and Ahmed try to pull him towards the bank.

The entire village and even Kurup gets hold of the rope enthusiastically and Velayudhan walks to the shore as the log gets pulled by the group of people. That night, Janaki and her daughter are confronted by Gopi, who lusts after her. In the following struggle, Janaki and the girl jumps into their well and Gopi escapes. In the morning, the cops arrives while Kurup tells Velayudhan that Gopi is responsible and also reveals that he is also the one who killed Valiya Nambiar. Velayudhan confronts Hamsa, and breaks his promise with a smile before beating up Hamsa while Kurup reveals to the villagers that Valiya Nambiar was murdered by Gopi. Gopi flees in his jeep, but gets interrupted by Velayudhan and the villagers. After a long fight, Velayudhan drowns Gopi in the river and kills him, thereby avenging the murders of Valiya Nambiar and Janaki. As the police arrives, Velayudhan hides his tears and reveals that he is too happy to see the entire Mullankolli Village present to bid farewell to him.

== Cast ==
- Mohanlal as Mullankolli Velayudhan
- Siddique as Gopinathan Nambiar "Cheriya" Nambiar, Valiya Nambiar's son-in-law, the main antagonist
- Madhu as Puthusseri Valiya Nambiar, Velayudhan's adopted father
- Innocent as Kelappan, Velayudhan's caretaker
- Jagathy Sreekumar as Panchayath Member Kurup
- Maniyanpilla Raju as Krishnan, Janaki's husband
- Bhavana as Leela, Kelappan's younger daughter
- Devayani as Janaki, Velayudhan's childhood crush and ex-lover
- Bindu Panicker as Narayaniyamma, Kelappan's wife
- Mamukkoya as Ahammedikka, Boat Man and Velayudhan's caretaker
- Vijeesh as Vasukkuttan, Toddy Supplier and Velayudhan's friend
- Rekha as Sunantha, Valiya Nambiar's daughter
- Bheeman Raghu as Keeri Raghavan
- Saikumar as Police Officer
- V. K. Sreeraman as Hajiyar, who runs a wood mill
- Anju Aravind as Zainaba, Hajiyar's daughter
- Sona Nair as Kunnummel Shantha, a prostitute
- Baby Niranjana as Janaki's daughter
- Manikandan Pattambi as a villager
- Thalapathy Dinesh as Hamsa
- Salim Kumar as Idimutti Rajan (guest appearance)
- Biju Pappan as Mattanchery Sivankutty
- Lakshmi Priya as Pushpa, Kelappan's elder daughter
- Vijayan Peringode as Unni Nair, a hotelier
- Augustine as Vareed, a marriage broker
- Keerikkadan Jose as Kuttychira Pappan
- Ottapalam Pappan as Kunjambu
- Idavela Babu as Paramu, Pappan's right-hand man
- Salu Kuttanad

== Production ==
Naran was initially the title given for a project starring Mohanlal, directed by Joshiy and written by Ranjan Pramod and a pooja ceremony was held for the film but was cancelled before beginning filming. Joshiy adapted the title of that film. The film is set in a village in a hilly area. It was shot at Hogenakkal village in the inter-state borders Chamarajanagar district of Karnataka and Dharmapuri district of Tamil Nadu. Mohanlal performed stunt scenes in the river in Hogenekkal. One day, Mohanlal spend an entire day in the river. It was after filming that the crew was informed that there was a crocodile in it.

== Music ==
Naran

Soundtrack album by Deepak Dev
- Released: 1 July 2007
- Genre: Feature film soundtrack
- Language: Malayalam
- Label: Manorama Music
- Producer: Aashirvad Cinemas

Deepak Dev chronology
Naa Oopiri	Naran	Ben Johnson

Singles from Ponnaryan
- 1. "Ponnaryan" Released: 1 January 2005

The film features original songs composed by Deepak Dev, lyrics were by Kaithapram Damodaran. The soundtrack album was released on 1 July 2007 by Manorama Music. Before that, a single, Ponnaryan, was released on 1 January 2005, composed by Sunny Joseph, written by O. N. V. Kurup and sung by K. J. Yesudas. The film was scored by Ouseppachan. The songs "Omal Kanmani" (Naran) and "Velmuruka" became trendsetters upon release. "Velmuruka" was choreographed by Prasanna. The song is often played on almost every Malayali occasion and it is frequently performed in local Ganamela in Kerala.

Naran (Original Motion Picture Soundtrack)
No.	Title	Singer(s)	Length
1.	"Thumbikkinnaram"	K. J. Yesudas, Gayatri Asokan	5:06
2.	"Velmuruka"	M. G. Sreekumar	5:26
3.	"Naran"	K. S. Chithra, Vineeth Sreenivasan	3:19
4.	"Minnadi Minnadi"	K. S. Chithra	3:54
5.	"Velmuruka" (Remix)	M. G. Sreekumar	4:36
6.	"Thumbikkinnaram" (Unplugged)		5:12
7.	"Minnadi Minnadi" (Karaoke)		3:52

== Release ==
Naran was released on 3 September 2005 prior to the Onam festival week in Kerala.

=== Box office ===
Naran was a commercial success. It was the top grosser among the Onam releases at Kerala box office, outperforming Chanthupottu and Nerariyan CBI. Including print and publicity, the film was reportedly made on a budget of ₹2.55 crore. The film had a huge opening day gross all over Kerala and Bangalore. The film had a 100 percent attendance in Kairali and Apsara theatres in Kozhikode. In Trivandrum, the police had to conduct mild lathi charge to disperse the crowd that turned violent in front of Sreekumar and Sreevisakh theatres. From the first two weeks itself, it collected a distributor's share of ₹1.69 crore and netted ₹2.70 Crore from the Kerala box office. Naran was one of the highest-grossing Malayalam films of the year. It ran for 100 days in major releasing centers. It was the third highest grosser of the year after Rajamanikyam and Udayananu Tharam.

=== Critical reception ===
Sify stated the film is a "paisa vasool" and wrote that "veteran director and his script writer Ranjan Pramod uses Mohanlal's larger-than-life image and blends it with the milieu, successfully in this action adventure film laced with sentiments. It is old wine in a new tetra pack with hardly any story or twists but the great man simply lights up the screen with his sheer presence." Franco Davis of Nowrunning wrote, "Mohanlal's performance is close to being called impeccable. The naturalness, for which he is famous for, comes through in trickles and flows. But the actor should take care about his ever-growing, rotund frame. He looks very bulky in the vest with a protruding paunch and tattooed biceps." Varnachithram wrote: "What makes this movie is interesting is Ranjan Pramod's script. Remember the movie Meesha Madhavan in which he bought into life a village called Chekku in which the hero was a thief, but had a heart of gold? Mullamkolli is a similar village with a similarly flawed hero."
