= P. V. Gangadharan =

Indian film producer and businessman (1943–2023)

- Born: Parayarukandi Vettath Gangadharan; 1943; Calicut, Madras Province, British India
- Died: 13 October 2023 (aged 80); Kozhikode, Kerala, India
- Occupations: Producer; businessman
- Years active: 1977–2023
- Notable work: spouse = P.V Sherien

Parayarukandi Vettath Gangadharan (1943 – 13 October 2023) was an Indian film producer and businessman from Kerala. He produced 22 Malayalam films under his production company Grihalakshmi Productions. As a producer, he won two National Film Awards, five Kerala State Film Awards, and six Filmfare Awards South among other awards.

== Biography ==
Parayarukandi Vettath Gangadharan was born at Calicut in 1943 to Madhavi Sami (1916–1996) and Sami of the Parayarukandi Vettath house (1912–1990), a popular businessman and founder of KTC Group of Companies. He was the younger brother of P. V. Chandran, managing editor of Mathrubhumi newspaper, and an industrialist himself. P. V. G., as he was known, also served as the director of Mathrubhumi.

Gangadharan was married to P.V. Sherien, daughter of former Advocate General Ratna Singh. He had three daughters: Shenuga Jaithilak, Shegna Vigil and Sherga Sandeep. He died on 13 October 2023, at the age of 80.

== Filmography (producer) ==
#	Movie	Year	Director
1	Sujatha	1977	Hariharan
2	Manasa Vacha Karmana	1979	I. V. Sasi
3	Angadi	1980	I. V. Sasi
4	Ahimsa	1981	I. V. Sasi
5	Chiriyo Chiri	1982	Balachandra Menon
6	Kattathe Kilikkoodu	1983	Bharathan
7	Ithiri Poove Chuvannapoove	1984	Bharathan
8	Ozhivukaalam	1985	Bharathan
9	Vartha	1986	I. V. Sasi
10	Oru Vadakkan Veeragatha	1989	Hariharan
11	Ennum Nanmakal	1991	Sathyan Anthikad
12	Adhwaytham	1992	Priyadarshan
13	Ekalavyan	1993	Shaji Kailas
14	Thooval Kottaram	1996	Sathyan Anthikad
15	Kaanaakkinaavu	1996	Sibi Malayil
16	Ennu Swantham Janakikutty	1998	Hariharan
17	Veendum Chila Veettukaryangal	1999	Sathyan Anthikad
18	Kochu Kochu Santhoshangal	2000	Sathyan Anthikad
19	Shantham	2001	Jayaraj
20	Achuvinte Amma	2005	Sathyan Anthikad
21	Yes Your Honour	2006	V. M. Vinu
22	Notebook	2006	Rosshan Andrrews
23	Janaki Jaane	2023	Aniesh Upasana

== Awards ==
National Film Awards

Year	Title
1997	Nargis Dutt Award for Best Feature Film on National Integration - Kanakkinavu
2000	Best Feature Film - Shantham

Filmfare Awards South

Year	Title
1986	Best Film - Vartha
1989	Best Film - Oru Vadakkan Veeragatha
1996	Best Film - Thooval Kottaram
1999	Best Film - Veendum Chila Veettukaryangal
2005	Best Film - Achuvinte Amma
2006	Best Film - Notebook

Kerala State Film Awards

Year	Title
1989	Kerala State Film Award for Best Film with Popular Appeal and Aesthetic Value- Oru Vadakkan Veeragatha
1997	Kerala State Film Award for Second Best Film- Kanakkinavu
1999	Best Film with Popular Appeal and Aesthetic Value - Veendum Chila Veettukaryangal
2005	Best Film with Popular Appeal and Aesthetic Value- Achuvinte Amma
2006	Second Best Film - Notebook

Asianet Film Awards

Year	Title
1999	Best Film Award - Veendum Chila Veettukaryangal
2005	Best Film Award - Achuvinte Amma
2009	Best Lifetime Achievement Award
