= Christian Brothers (film) =

2011 film by Joshiy

- Theatrical release poster
- Directed by: Joshiy
- Written by: Udayakrishna-Siby K. Thomas
- Produced by: A. V. Anoop; Maha Subair
- Starring: Mohanlal; Suresh Gopi; Dileep; R. Sarathkumar
- Cinematography: Anil Nair
- Edited by: Ranjan Abraham
- Music by: Deepak Dev; C. Rajamani
- Production company: Varnachithra Big Screen
- Distributed by: AVA Productions
- Release date: 18 March 2011 (India)
- Running time: 181 minutes
- Country: India
- Language: Malayalam
- Budget: ₹9 crore

Christian Brothers is a 2011 Indian Malayalam language epic action thriller film directed by Joshiy and written by Udayakrishna and Siby K. Thomas. The film features Mohanlal in the title role alongside Suresh Gopi, Dileep and R. Sarathkumar with an ensemble supporting cast. The film features musical score composed by Rajamani and songs by Deepak Dev.

Christian Brothers was released worldwide on 18 March 2011 and had the largest release for a Malayalam language film at that time.. The film was a commercial success and was the highest grossing Malayalam movie of 2011.

== Plot ==
Palamattathu Varghese Mappila is a generationally wealthy man and retired captain from the Indian Army. He is a widower and has four children named Christy, Joji, Jessy and Stella. Varghese is entrusted with an important document pertaining to the transfer of vast amount of land, which was once granted to the Christian missionaries by his younger brother Thomas alias Kochu Thoma, a village officer. While Varghese was serving in the Army, his children were taken care by Kochu Thoma, who remained unmarried, took care of them and buried the absence of motherly affection and care. Christy is currently working as a high-profile police informant and as a secret agent of the Central Government in Mumbai. Joji left for Italy to study theology, but he travels to London and later opts out after he falls in love with Meenakshi, the daughter of State Home Minister Sudhakaran.

Kunnel Kumaran Thampi, a ruthless liquor baron wants to usurp the land for the construction of a resort, where he kills Kochu Thoma for his incorruptible obstinacy and orders to dump his body in a quagmire with his car, where he sets to find the documents. Varghese lodges a missing petition with the cops regarding the prolonged disappearance of his brother. Meanwhile, Meenakshi's father learns her relationship with Joji and fakes a heart attack to make Meenakshi return from London. When Joji finds out that she is leaving, he joins her but her cousin Vinod and his friends burns his passport. Upon returning to India, Meenakshi gets kidnapped and the case is assigned to Christy due to his professional experience. To his shock, Christy learns that the kidnapper is Jessy's husband Georgekutty and recollects his past.

Past: Christy arrived at Mumbai to work as a senior manager in a bank, where he decided to spend some time with Jessy and Georgekutty who were also in Mumbai at the time. Unbeknownst to them, Georgekutty was a pimp, womaniser and a gangster, who is also involved in narcotics and extortion. Christy happens to run into a cat and goose chase when Georgekutty was targeted by Andrews Bandara alias Karim Lala's men. Georgekutty gave a gun to Christy, with which he killed a few goons during the fight. Christy was imprisoned as the gun carried his fingerprints. When Jessy learns of this, she tries to inform Varghese, but Jessy is killed by Georgekutty. Georgekutty misleads the entire family into believing that Christy was the reason for Jessy's death. Since then, Varghese disowns Christy and considers Georgekutty as his elder son while Christy is released from prison by Andrews.

Present: Christy goes to the building where Georgekutty has kept Meenakshi as hostage and rescues her. After a few hours, the cops learn that Georgekutty was murdered. After George Kutty is found murdered, Christy is arrested as the primary suspect by SP Joseph Vadakkan and City Commissioner Hariharan Thampi. During the investigation, Andrews Bandra appears and deceives the officers by posing as Christy's enemy, claiming that a gang-war is ongoing between them. He convinces the police that Christy should be released into his custody so he can end the war by killing him. Believing his story, the police implement strict security measures while escorting Christy to court. During the transfer, Andrews stages a fabricated gang-war attack, creating chaos and the illusion of a confrontation with the police, and uses the situation to cleverly rescue Christy.

Joseph marries Stella while Christy attends the marriage in secret. With Joseph's help, Christy helps Joji and Meenakshi get married. Later, Joseph tells Varghese about Christy's innocence in Georgekutty's and Jessy's death. They all return home and Christy reconciles with Varghese.

Soon, Joseph concludes that Joji is Georgekutty's murderer. Being questioned by Joseph, Joji reveals the truth. After Vinod and his friends burned his passport, he revealed everything to Georgekutty and seeks help from him to convince Meenakshi about the plan her father had made to separate them. But Georgekutty plays foul and bargained ransom with Meenakshi. Joji arrives at the place and learned this after he saw Georgekutty's conversation with Christy. When Joji confronted Georgekutty, he reveals his true face and Christy's innocence. Angrily, Joji kills Georgekutty with Christy's gun, as he ruined their family and killed Jessy. Christy believed that what he did was right and decided to take the blame to save Joji. Varghese overhears the conversation and becomes very emotional. At this time, Kumaran Thampi, along with his sons and goons barge into Palamattathu to steal the property deed from Varghese's locker and hurriedly leaves after fatally shooting Varghese. During the chaos, Thampi reveals the fate of Kochu Thoma, which is later told to Christy by a terribly wounded Varghese. At the hospital, the doctors administer ventilator support to Varghese, as his condition is critical. Enraged about Varghese's plight and the murder of his loving uncle, Christy and Joseph goes to take revenge on Kumaran Thampi. Meanwhile, a group of goons tries to kidnap Meenakshi and attack Joji. Andrews saves them and fights all the goons. They later go to help Christy and Joseph and the four of them together kill Kunnel Kumaran Thampi and his sons.

== Cast ==
- Mohanlal as Christy Varghese Mappila (Sherson)
- Suresh Gopi as SP Joseph Vadakkan IPS, Christy's brother-in-law
- Dileep as Joji Varghese Mappila, Christy's younger brother and Joseph Vadakkan's brother-in-Law (extended cameo appearance)
- R. Sarathkumar as Andrews Bandra (Karim Lala), Christy's brother like friend (extended cameo appearance)
- Sai Kumar as Captain Palamattathu Varghese Mappilla, Ex-Indian Army officer and feudal lord. Christy's, Joji', Jessy's and Stella's father and Joseph's father-in-law
- Vijayaraghavan as Kunnel Kumaran Thampi
- Biju Menon as Commissioner Hariharan Thampi IPS, Kunnel Kumaran Thampi's younger son
- Jayan Cherthala as Rajan Thampi, Kunnel Kumaran Thampi's elder son
- Kaniha as Stella Varghese Mappila, Christy's and Joji's younger sister and Joseph Vadakkan's wife
- Kavya Madhavan as Meenakshi, Joji's lover turned wife
- Subair as Anil Thampi, Kumaran Thampi's son in law
- Anand as Ranjith, Christy's assistant
- Niyas Musliyar as Rocky, Christy's assistant
- Kiran Raj as Williams, Andrews's assistant
- Devan as Sudhakaran, Home Minister of Kerala and Meenakshi's father
- Jagathy Sreekumar as Thomas Palamattathu (Kochu Thoma), Varghese Mappilla's younger brother
- Babu Antony as Captain Rasheed Rahman, NSG officer
- Suresh Krishna as George Kutty, Jessy's husband who is a pimp
- Sivaji Guruvayoor as IG Chandradas IPS
- Anoop Chandran as Kunjachan, Varghese Mappila's assistant
- Salim Kumar as Purushothaman, Minister's personal assistant
- Kunchan as Achuthan, Minister's driver
- Shobha Mohan as Viji, Sudhakaran's wife and Meenakshi's mother
- Kalabhavan Shajon as SI Damodaran
- Santhosh Jogi as SI Johnson
- Jagannatha Varma as Bishop Alexander
- P. Sreekumar as Sathyanath IAS, Home Secretary of Kerala
- Kollam Thulasi as Tahsildar
- Lakshmi Gopalaswamy as Jessy Varghese Mappila, Christy's younger sister
- Raai Laxmi as Sophie, Christy's love interest
- Kaviyoor Ponnamma as Joseph's mother
- Harisree Ashokan as Krishnankutty, marriage broker
- Suraj Venjaramood as Pappu, Master chef in minister's house
- Kazan Khan as Khan Bhai, Karim Lala's assistant
- Besant Ravi as Crane Murugan

== Production ==
=== Development ===
The film was announced as a big budget film but the Kerala Film Producers Association had set a norm that no Malayalam film should have a budget of more than ₹3.5 crore. The association refused to give a clearance for the film's shoot. The producers stated that given the star-cast and the subject of the film, it is not possible to make it at a lesser budget. Following the interests from stars, exhibitors and theatre-owners, the film was given a clearance despite its budget, which was many times the restriction set by the association.

Tamil actor Arjun Sarja registered a complaint with Association of Malayalam Movie Artists (AMMA) about using his name and photographs in connection with the film without his consent or knowledge. Arjun commented that no one has approached him to act in Christian Brothers and all this has happened without his consent or knowledge. However, the issue was resolved when there came an official clarification that Arjun was replaced by actor Sarathkumar in the film.

In February 2010, it was reported that the producers of Christian Brothers excluded actor Thilakan from the film at the request of the Film Employees Federation of Kerala (FEFKA), the predominant film technicians association. Thilakan had been earlier signed for the role played by Sai Kumar in the film. On 3 February 2010, Thilakan publicly protested against the unofficial ban enforced on him by FEFKA. The Association of Malayalam Movie Artists issued a show cause notice to Thilakan for bringing the issue into the public domain. Thilakan accused AMMA, of which he too is a member. Several political parties came out openly in support of Thilakan.

=== Filming ===
The film began production on 11 January 2010. First schedule of the film occurred at various locales in Kerala from January through September 2010. Palamattam tharavadu, where the major parts of the film is set was shot from Netto's bungalow near Edakochi. The second schedule, which mainly included picturisation of a song, commenced in London the same month. The principal photography was completed by the end of 2010.

== Music ==
Christian Brothers

Soundtrack album to Christian Brothers by Deepak Dev
- Released: 11 March 2011
- Recorded: 2011
- Venue: Chennai
- Studio: Kodandapani Studio
- Genre: Feature Film Soundtrack
- Length: 18:31
- Label: Satyam Audios
- Producer: Deepak Dev

Deepak Dev chronology
Tournament – Play & Replay (2010)	Christian Brothers (2011)	Urumi (2011)
External audio
- Audio Jukebox (Satyam Audios) on YouTube
- Video Song on YouTube

Singles from Christian Brothers
- 1. "Karthaave Nee" Released: 11 March 2011; 2. "Sayyaave" Released: 11 March 2011

The soundtrack features four songs composed by Deepak Dev with lyrics by Kaithapram Damodaran Namboothiri. The songs managed to top the music charts in the initial weeks. The soundtrack album was released by Satyam Audios.

Christian Brothers: Original Motion Picture Soundtrack
No.	Title	Singer(s)	Length
1.	"Karthaave nee kalppichappol"	Shankar Mahadevan	4:58
2.	"Sayyaave"	Shankar Mahadevan, Shweta Mohan	5:05
3.	"Mizhikalil Naanam"	Nikhil Mohan, Ranjith, Rimi Tomy	4:31
4.	"Karthaave"
5.	Untitled (Karaoke Version)		4:32
Total length:			22:58

== Controversies ==
Complaint by Arjun

Tamil actor Arjun registered a complaint with Association of Malayalam Movie Artistes (AMMA) about using his name and photographs in connection with the film without his consent or knowledge. Arjun commented that no one has approached him to act in Christian Brothers and all this has happened without his consent or knowledge. However, the issue was resolved when there came an official clarification that Arjun was replaced by another Tamil actor Sarathkumar in the film.

Replacement of Thilakan

In February 2010, it was reported that the producers of Christian Brothers excluded many actors from the film, including veteran actor Thilakan from the film at the request of the Film Employees Federation of Kerala (FEFKA), the predominant film technicians association. Thilakan had been earlier signed for the role played by Sai Kumar in the film. On 3 February 2010, Thilakan publicly protested against the unofficial ban enforced on him by FEFKA. The Association of Malayalam Movie Artists (AMMA) issued a show cause notice to Thilakan for bringing the issue into the public domain. Thilakan accused AMMA, of which he too is a member. Several political parties came out openly in support of Thilakan.

== Release ==
The film was released with a total of 400 prints; 157 centres in Kerala, 100 centres outside Kerala and 85 centres overseas, making it the largest release for a Malayalam film at that time.This film beat previous collection records. It was released in the United Kingdom, United States and Australia on 25 March 2011, in Gulf countries on 31 March 2011.

== Reception ==
=== Box office ===
The film was made on a budget of ₹9 crore (US$930,000). Christian Brothers completed 100 days run at theatres. In two weeks, the film grossed ₹11.35 crore (US$1.2 million) from Kerala box office with a distributors share of ₹5.60 crore (US$580,000). It did good business in initial weeks grabbing a distributors share of ₹8.5 crore (US$880,000) in 25 days. Christian Brothers was the highest-grossing Malayalam film of the year. Apart from the box office revenue, the film made ₹5 crore (US$520,000) from satellite, overseas and outside Kerala distribution rights.

=== Critical response ===
The film received positive reviews praising plot and the performances. Neethu Reghukumar of Bangalore Mirror gave a positive review and said, "The much-anticipated Christian Brothers proved to be worth the wait. Finally fans have something to rejoice as he has made a rollicking start this year. Back in all elements, all steals the show, firing on all cylinders. However, at no stage the multi-starrer film does appear as a one-man show."

M. Ashitha of Deccan Herald commented, "True, too many cooks spoil the broth. Despite having the luxury of actors like Mohanlal, Suresh Gopi, Dileep and Sarath Kumar together in the movie, Christian Brothers turns out not to be a disappointment. The film, heavily depending on the star power, is a good entertainment." Paresh C. Palicha of Rediff.com stated, "Christian Brothers is a typical multi-starrer that is made with an eye at the box office with not much depth in the subject. But you still get entertained."

Sify.com's reviewer rated the film as a "Racy Entertainer" and stated, "Christian Brothers is a loud and high voltage thriller, for which you don't have to use your brains much. It could have definitely been more enjoyable if it was shorter by some twenty minutes or so, but even in the current form it could make you smile as the end credits start rolling. It's absolutely a no logic-popcorn fun and perhaps not meant to be taken too seriously."
