= V. R. Lalithambika =

Indian engineer

- Born: Thiruvananthapuram, Kerala
- Education: B.Tech from College of Engineering, Thiruvananthapuram M.Tech in Control Engineering from College of Engineering, Thiruvananthapuram
- Occupation: Scientist at ISRO
- Years active: 1988 - Present
- Employer: Indian Space Research Organisation

Dr. V. R. Lalithambika (born 1962) is an Indian engineer and scientist who has been working with the Indian Space Research Organisation (ISRO). She is a specialist in Advanced Launcher Technologies and was leading the Gaganyaan mission to send Indian astronauts to space by 2022.

== Early life ==
Lalithambika was born in 1962 in Thiruvananthapuram, Kerala, India. The proximity of her house to the Thumba rocket testing centre got her fascinated by ISRO, right from her childhood. Her exposure to science started very early primarily because of her grandfather, who used to make gadgets like lenses, microscopes, etc. at the house itself and also kept her updated about ISRO's work. Her grandfather was a mathematician, an astronomer, and a gadget-maker. Her father was also an engineer.

She studied B. Tech. in Electrical Engineering at the College of Engineering, Trivandrum and later pursued her M. Tech. in Control Engineering at the College of Engineering, Trivandrum. She worked at two colleges before joining ISRO. She did her Ph.D. while working with ISRO.

== Career ==
Lalithambika is a specialist in Advanced Launch Vehicle Technology. She had joined the Vikram Sarabhai Space Centre (VSSC), Thiruvananthapuram, in 1988. She led a team that designed rocket control and guidance systems. She has worked with various ISRO rockets including the Augmented Satellite Launch Vehicle (ASLV), Polar Satellite Launch Vehicle (PSLV) and Geosynchronous Satellite Launch Vehicle (GSLV) and Reusable Launch Vehicle (RLV). She has been a part of over 100 space missions.

Before moving to ISRO headquarters in Bengaluru, she was the deputy director (control, guidance and simulation) at VSSC, Thiruvananthapuram. She will lead the Gaganyaan mission as the Director of the Indian Human Spaceflight Programme which is intended to send Indian astronauts into space by 2022.

== Awards ==
She was awarded the Space Gold Medal (2001), ISRO Individual Merit Award and ISRO Performance Excellence Award (2013). She has also won Astronautical Society of India award for excellence in launch vehicle technology. In 2023 she was awarded the highest French civilian order Legion d'Honneur for boosting space cooperation between India and France.

== Personal life ==
Her husband Pradeep Kumar A. B. is former Chairman of Kerala State Pollution Control Board.
