= Annmariya Kalippilaanu =

- Theatrical poster
- Directed by: Midhun Manuel Thomas
- Written by: Midhun Manuel Thomas; John Manthrichal
- Produced by: Alice George
- Starring: Sara Arjun; Sunny Wayne; Aju Varghese; Siddique; Leona Lishoy; Saiju Kurup
- Cinematography: Vishnu Sarma
- Edited by: Lijo Paul
- Music by: Songs: Shaan Rahman; Background Score: Sooraj S. Kurup
- Production company: Goodwill Entertainments
- Distributed by: Playhouse Motion Pictures
- Release date: 5 August 2016
- Running time: 127 minutes
- Country: India
- Language: Malayalam

Annmariya Kalippilannu (transl. Annmariya is Angry) is a 2016 Indian Malayalam-language children's film directed by Midhun Manuel Thomas, and written by Thomas and John Manthrichal. The film stars Sara Arjun, Sunny Wayne, Siddique and Aju Varghese. along with a cameo appearance by Dulquer Salmaan. It was later dubbed into Telugu as Pilla Rakshasi and in Tamil as Annmariya . The film was a box office success.

The film narrates the story of friendship of a schoolkid (Sara) and an easygoing youth (Wayne) and the changes this relationship brings about in their life. It was released on August 5, 2016.

== Plot ==
Annmaria aka Ann is the 10-year-old daughter of Dr. Roy and his wife Dr. Teresa Roy. Roy tells Ann of how he went to Kakkadan Mala, a hill in his hometown and prayed for an angel. An angel appeared and blessed him, thus he got a medal in long jump. Ann dreams of meeting the angel and winning a medal in long jump.

Ann overhears her mother advising their domestic help to call a goon and beat up an unwanted suitor. One day, she sees her English teacher being harassed by David, the PT master. She informs the principal, who then questions David. But David, who has political influence, escapes easily. He then begins to have a grudge on Ann.

On the day of the sports trials, David deliberately disqualifies Ann as revenge. A heartbroken Ann plans revenge. She recalls what her mother said about hiring a goon. She approaches her friend Avinash for help. Avinash, although initially stunned, agrees to help. He approaches his friend Sarath, a boaster. Sarath arranges a goon, named Poombatta Gireesh, who is a relative of Sarath. Gireesh is actually a fraudster working with his good-for-nothing con friend Ambrose. Ann offers him an iPhone 6s, as his fee, which he takes. He and Ambrose take the phone to Sabu, who owns a mobile shop. Sabu however cheats them and only pays 2000 in place of the real amount of 50,000.

Ann and Avinash is eagerly waiting for Girish to beat up PT master, they confronts Girish and Ambrose who laughs the matter off. Ann seeks the help of her uncle who is a Sub Inspector in Police. Her uncle procures the iPhone from Sabu and give it to Ann. She confronts Girish again and says that she is ready to give iPhone provided he does the deed. To her luck there was a local goon, Suku, whom Girish owes some money. He forces Girish to confront PT master and take the iPhone.

With no other way Girish faces David and is knocked out in single kick. Ann seeks her mother help and hospitalises Girish. He later wakes at hospital and Teresa realises that it's through her conversation Ann got the idea of hiring a goon. Ann feels bad for Girish as he is badly beaten up. She gives all her savings plus some borrowed money from Teresa to Girish. This act of Ann deeply influence Girish and he wants to repay her by getting the iPhone back.

Meanwhile, the relationship between Teresa and Roy is on a low note. She is contemplating a divorce and Roy hurries back to meet his family. Ann is exciting on meeting Roy and wants to spend some quality time with parents. She overhears discussion of her parents about divorce and is shattered.

Girish gets to know from Sabu that he has sold iPhone to Baby, a self made millionaire realtor. He meets Baby and ask him to give back the iPhone. As Baby has the policy of not selling once bought items, Girish had to leave empty handed. But Girish is persistent and keeps bothering Baby. Finally late night when Baby is fully drunk and unable to drive, Girish drives Baby back to home. On reaching home Baby was impressed with honesty of Girish and offers him a full-time job as his driver.

Girish, now a changed man develops good relationship with Baby and shares the story of iPhone. Baby gives back iPhone to Girish as token for his efforts. Girish returns the iPhone back to Ann and become good friends with her.

Ann is in double mind to participate for long jump in annual school meet. Girish offers to ride her to Kakkadan mala and arranges a person to role-play as angel. Baby shares tragic death of his daughter, and encourages Girish to make happen Ann's dream of meeting angel. Girish gets the permission of Teresa and drives her to the mountain top. Girish is worried if arranged person would show up on time. By coincidence someone comes as an angel. Ann is elated and tells her innermost wish. On their return journey David sees them and make out it's Ann who arranged to get him beaten up.

During sports meet, David approaches Ann and shows the photograph and threaten her to get dismissed. She is shaken and while preparing for the jump she collapses. Girish knowing this musters the courage to challenge David and beats him black and blue.

A little while later Ann is shown to be participating in a zonal level meet. Her first two jumps were fouls and is very disappointed. Suddenly the person whom she met at mountain top and mistook for angel shows up and encourages her, who was indeed an angel. With a new found confidence she takes the jump and comes first. Girish reveals that her parents have reconciled and her father going to stay always with her thus giving a happy ending to the story. With Baby's help, Ambrose gets a job as a helper in a lorry, going to North India. The driver turns out to be Suku.

== Cast ==
- Sara Arjun as Annmariya / Ann
- Sunny Wayne as Gireesh a.k.a. Poombatta Gireesh
- Master Vishal Krishna as Avinash, Ann's wannabe boyfriend
- Aju Varghese as Ambrose
- Siddique as Baby Perumkudy
- Saiju Kurup as Dr. Roy, Annmariya's father
- Leona Lishoy as Dr. Teresa Roy, Annmariya's mother
- Shine Tom Chacko as Suku
- Dharmajan Bolgatty as Saabu
- Sethu Lakshmi as Gireesh's mother
- John Kaippallil as David, PT Master
- Althaf Manaf as Sarath, Avinash's boaster friend
- Vijayakumar as SI
- Bijukuttan as Vellichapadu/ Angel for hire
- Anjali Aneesh as Megha, English Teacher
- Dulquer Salmaan as Angel (cameo)
- Saranya Sasi
- Divya M Nair as Advocate

== Production ==
The film is jointly scripted by Midhun Manuel Thomas and John Manthrichal. While Vishnu Sharma handles photography, songs are composed by Shaan Rahman and while the score is composed by Sooraj S. Kurup.

In June 2016, Dulquer Salmaan released the first look poster of the film and announced that he will make a special appearance in it. "His character is integral to the development of the plot" said Midhun Thomas in an interview. This is Midhun's second feature film, unlike his first venture, this film is all about soul, freshness and unadulterated fun which could be enjoyed as a family.

== Music ==
Annmariya Kalippilannu

Soundtrack album by Shaan Rahman
- Released: August 2016
- Recorded: 2016
- Genre: Feature film soundtrack
- Length: 5:50
- Language: Malayalam
- Label: Millennium audios

Soundtrack
No.	Title	Lyrics	Singer(s)	Length
1.	"Tharamai Thinkalai"	Manu Manjith	Sachin Warrier	2:46
2.	"Kurumbathi Chundari Nee"	Manu Manjith	Vineeth Sreenivasan	3:04
Total length:				5:50

== Release ==
Annmariya Kalippilannu released on August 5, 2016. Sethu Lakshmi won the Asianet Film Award for Best Supporting Actress for this film in 2016.
