= Meesa Madhavan =

2002 Malayalam movie, directed by Lal Jose

Meesha Madhavan
- Official poster
- Directed by: Lal Jose
- Written by: Ranjan Pramod
- Produced by: Maha Subair; Sudhish
- Starring: Dileep; Indrajith Sukumaran; Kavya Madhavan; Jagathy Sreekumar
- Narrated by: Ranjith
- Cinematography: S. Kumar
- Edited by: Ranjan Abraham
- Music by: Vidyasagar
- Production company: Moviekshetra
- Distributed by: Kalasangham Films; Kas; Varnachithra
- Release date: 4 July 2002
- Running time: 160 minutes
- Country: India
- Language: Malayalam
- Budget: ₹1.45 crore
- Box office: ₹21 crores

Meesha Madhavan (lit. 'Moustache Madhavan') is a 2002 Indian Malayalam-language action comedy film directed by Lal Jose and written by Ranjan Pramod. The film stars Dileep in the title role, while Indrajith Sukumaran, Kavya Madhavan, Jagathy Sreekumar, Harisree Asokan and Cochin Haneefa play supporting roles. It became the highest-grossing Malayalam film ever at the time and was the highest grossing film of the year. The success of the movie catapulted Dileep to superstardom in Malayalam cinema. It was remade in Telugu as Dongodu (2003) starring Ravi Teja, in Kannada as Hori (2011) starring Vinod Prabhakar and in Tamil as Kollaikaran (2012) starring Vidharth.

== Synopsis ==
The story revolves around Madhavan, a man who became a petty thief due to family debts and is well respected by the villagers. However, he lands in trouble after he gets falsely accused of stealing the idol of the village goddess. He escapes from the police custody and tries to find the real culprit.

== Plot ==
The prologue shows a young Madhavan stealing from the house of Krishnavilasam Bhageerathan Pillai, a cut-throat loan shark. While escaping, he is helped by an old thief, 'Mullani' Pappan, who learns the boy was stealing to pay a debt due the next day.

Set in the fictional village of Chekk, Palakkad, the story introduces Madhavan, a local Robin Hood nicknamed "Meesa" Madhavan on Vishu. Madhavan and his friends, ruins the Vishu kani of his nemesis Bhageerathan. Madhavan had turned to petty thieving after his father's death to support his family. His epithet "Meesa" Madhavan, reflects the belief that if he twirls his handlebar moustache, a robbery will occur.

When a corrupt new Sub-Inspector, Eapen Pappachi, arrives, Bhageerathan allies with him to publicly humiliate Madhavan. Eapen threatens to make Madhavan shave his moustache. To save his house from Bhageerathan's scheme, Madhavan plans to win over his daughter, Rukmini, who was also his childhood sweetheart. After she insults him and challenges him to steal from her house, he accepts. Madhavan steals her golden waist Chain, knowing she cannot report the theft without dishonoring herself.

A humiliated Rukmini teams up with her father and his dim witted adviser Thirivikraman to frame Madhavan for theft by burying banknotes in his yard. Eapen and the police arrive during a marriage proposal for Madhavan’s sister and force him to dig, but they find only jackfruit seeds. Eapen arrests Madhavan and thrashes him at the station, but he is bailed out by Advocate Mukundan Unni. Madhavan confronts the trio for ruining his sister’s marriage proposal, threatening Bhageerathan. Rukmini, realizing her mistake, begins to fall for him. Eapen, who pursues Rukmini, is later beaten up by Madhavan after showing up at her house drunk. Eapen then accuses Rukmini of having an affair with Madhavan, causing an enraged Bhageerathan to lock her in her room.

Bhageerathan’s advocate convinces him to seize Madhavan's property to force him to abandon Rukmini. Faced with losing his home and his sister’s wedding, Madhavan publicly declares his love for Rukmini. To help him, his sister’s fiancé Balan gives Madhavan the money needed to settle his debt. Madhavan goes to the temple to thank the goddess, which is witnessed by an ambalavasi Warrier even though the sanctum is closed.

The next day, the temple idol is missing and everyone thinks that Madhavan stolen it. Eapen arrests Madhavan who is attacked by a mob but he escapes and meets Pappan, the only one who believes his innocence. While hiding, Madhavan discovers that Eapen stolen the idol with the help of 2 men and has hidden it in a deadwells in Pappan’s compound. Pappan and Madhavan plans to expose Eapen by forcing him to retrieve the idol in front of the villagers. After a duel and a brief capture, Madhavan is freed by Pappan. The mob, now led by the Head Constable Nambooriyachan, helps Madhavan to overpower Eapen and his men. Madhavan returns the idol, becomes a hero and Bhageerathan accepts his relationship with Rukmini.

== Cast ==
- Dileep as Poovathingal Madhavan Nair (Meesha Madhavan)
  - Arun Kumar as Young Madhavan
- Indrajith Sukumaran as SI Eapen Pappachi, the main antagonist
- Kavya Madhavan as Rukmini, Madhavan's childhood sweetheart
  - Sanusha as Young Rukmini
- Jagathy Sreekumar as Krishnavilasom Bhageerathan Pillai, Rukmini's father
- Harisree Ashokan as Sugunan, Madhavan's friend and Handyman Working at Village Store
- Cochin Haneefa as Thrivikraman, Bhageerathan Pillai's Adviser and Political Member at Thiruvananthapuram
- Salim Kumar as Advocate Mukundan Unni, Madhavan's friend and advocate
- Oduvil Unnikrishnan as Head Constable Achuthan Namboothiri, Prabha's Father, Madhavan's Father's Close Friend
- Mala Aravindan as "Mullani" Pappan, Madhavan's Mentor
- Jyothirmayi as Prabha, Achuthan's Daughter and Madhavan's Ex-Lover
- Karthika Mathew as Malathi, Madhavan's Younger Sister
- Sukumari as Yashodha Madhavan's Mother
- James as Pattalam Purushu, Madhavan's Friend and Soldier
- E. A. Rajendran as Poovathingal Vishwam, Madhavan's Elder Brother and Post Office Employee
- Machan Varghese as Lineman Lonappan, Madhavan's Friend and KSEB Employee Worker
- Manikandan Pattambi as Pushkaran, Madhavan's Friend
- Guinness Pakru as Tea Boy
- J. Pallassery as Poovathingal Gangadharan Nair, Madhavan's Father
- Jayesh Pazhanimala as Madhavan's childhood friend
- Kalabhavan Prajod as Prabha's Husband
- Ambika Mohan as Santhamma, Bhageerathan Pillai's Wife and Rukmini's Mother and Madhavan's Supporter
- Gayathri as Sarasu, Purushu's wife and Bhageerathan Pillai's Lover
- Meena Ganesh as Kalmayi Thatha, the village match-maker who brings proposal for Malathi
- Yamuna as Sindhu, Vishwam's Wife and Madhavan's Sister-in-Law
- Dinesh Prabhakar as Koya, Madhavan's Friend
- Vijayan Peringode as Warrier, Temple Committee Member
- Abraham Koshy as Eapen's henchman
- Kozhikode Narayanan Nair as Mukundan Unni's Senior Advocate and Bhageerathan Pillai's Legal Aide
- Alexander Prasanth as Background dancer in the track "Penne Penne"
- Arun Cherukavil as Background dancer in the track "Penne Penne"

== Soundtrack ==
Meesha Madhavan

Soundtrack album by Vidyasagar
- Released: 6 June 2002
- Genre: Feature film soundtrack
- Label: Satyam Audios
- Producer: Vidyasagar

Vidyasagar chronology
| Randam Bhavam (2001) | Meesha Madhavan (2002) | Pattalam (2003) |

The music album of Meesa Madhavan happens to be one of the most popular works of Vidyasagar. The lyrics were written by Gireesh Puthenchery. Originally, the song 'Elavathooru Kayalinde' was written by Arumugan Venkitangu as a folksong. A part of the song "Karimizhi Kuruviye" was reused by Vidyasagar himself in "Aasai Aasai Ippozhuthu" in Dhool and "Rafta Rafta" in Hulchal.

| Track | Song title | Singers | Raga(s) |
|---|---|---|---|
| 1 | "Ente Ellamellam" | K. J. Yesudas, Sujatha Mohan, Sreeja Ravi(Dialogues) | Desh |
| 2 | "Karimizhi Kuruviye" | Sujatha Mohan, V. Devanand | Kapi |
| 3 | "Penne Penne" | M. G. Sreekumar, K. S. Chithra, Kalyani Menon. | Valachi |
| 4 | "Chingamaasam" | Shankar Mahadevan, Rimy Tomy | Shanmukhapriya |
| 5 | "Theme Music" | Instrumental | |
| 6 | "Elavathooru" | P. Madhuri | |
| 7 | "Pathiri Chuttu" | Machad Vasanthi | |
| 8 | "Ente Ellam" | K. J. Yesudas | |
| 9 | "Karimizhi Kuruviye" | Sujatha Mohan | Kapi |
| 10 | "Vaaleduthal" | Vidhu Prathap, Anuradha Sriram | Kharaharapriya |

== Reception ==
A critic from Deccan Herald wrote that "After Tenkashi Pattanam, this is another comedy that actually tickles you into laughter. Portraying the travails of a thief, Dileep characteristically performs to perfection eclipsing even the versatile Jagadhi Sreekumar. Kavya Madhavan as Rukmani has pretty little to do. The storyline itself has nothing new to offer, but it is the treatment of situations that require credit".

== Box office ==
The film was commercial success at the box office and became the highest-grossing Malayalam film of 2002, boosting Dileep to superstardom. It had completed 250 days in theatres.

== Accolades ==
Kerala Film Critics Association Awards

- Best Music Director – Vidyasagar
- Best Choreographer – Prasannan
