= Maalgudi Days =

- Directed by: Visakh Vivek Vinod
- Starring: Anoop Menon; Bhama; Janaki Menon; Vishal Krishna; Saiju Kurup; T P Madhavan; Priyanka Nair
- Cinematography: Anil Nair
- Edited by: Shaijal PV
- Music by: Dr Praveen, T S Vishnu
- Production company: V Company
- Distributed by: Murali Films
- Release date: 8 January 2016
- Running time: 124 Minutes
- Country: India
- Language: Malayalam

Maalgudi Days is a 2016 Indian Malayalam-language thriller film scripted and directed by brothers Vivek, Visakh, and Vinod in their directorial debut. Set in an imaginary school named Malgudi Residential School, it is based on a real incident that happened in the Indian state of Nagaland in the year 2002. The film stars Anoop Menon, Bhama, Janaki Menon, Vishal Krishna, and Saiju Kurup in the lead roles. It was released on 8 January 2016.

Janaki Menon won the Best Child Actor (Female) at Kerala State Film Awards 2015 for portraying the character of Atheena in the film.
Master Vishal Krishna and Janaki Menon won Best Child artists Kerala Film Critics Association Awards for portraying the character of Milan and Atheena.

== Plot ==
The story happens in a winter season at a hill station near Vagamon. The landmark of the place is Malgudi National Public School which has “winter vacation” in place of summer vacation. The two child characters are Atheena and Milan pursuing their studies in this school.

Atheena:- 9 years old girl who is under depression after the accidental death of her father and is referred to this school by a psychiatrist to recover from the haunting memories of her father's demise, but carries his spectacles with her.

Milan:- 9 years old boy who is troublesome for the entire staff and other children in the school because of his mischievous nature. Milan and Atheena, though poles apart in character, soon become friends. In fact, it is the diversity in their nature which brings them together.

Zephan:- The lead role in the movie who is an escaped convict now. A flash back shows that he is an artist and craftsman by profession and was living happily with his wife and daughter, in a nearby village. One night when their daughter is away, his life turns topsy-turvy, after giving shelter to 4 unknown men in his house. What ensues is a series of unfortunate incidents and now he is on the run for his life, trying to evade police arrest. He seeks refuge in an abandoned house adjacent to the school.

Atheena and Milan accidentally meet Zephan at the deserted house behind the school. Though frightened in the beginning, later they feel sympathetic for him as he is badly injured. Even though he is not disclosing his identity and his miseries, they get a feeling that he could be innocent. They start helping him with food, water and medicines which eventually builds up a strong emotional bond between them. He impresses them with his innovative art work (Origami style).

Advent of winter:- Principal declares vacation and Zephan realizes this would be best time for him to plan his escape. On the final day, Atheena realizes that she missed to take her father's spectacles and she along with Milan gets down from the school bus and sneaks their way to the hostel room. By chance, security locks the hostel without realizing that children are inside and the bus filled with students returning home sets off without them.

The second half of the movie is about the 48 hours of their struggle to escape from the hostel room surviving the thirst, hunger, cold and fear. As Milan tries to escape by using the bathroom window, he falls on the roof below it. Meanwhile, Zephan returns to the school after he sees the news reporting that Atheena and Milan are missing. Zephan calls out to Milan when he sees him lying on the roof, but Milan accidentally falls and Zephan manages to catch him. After finding Atheena, Zephan lays them both on the stairs leading to the school office. After walking to the nearest shop for water, he finds it closed. He then sees the police standing nearby and surrenders so that the police can find and rescue the kids. The children are then found by the police and taken to the hospital where they wake up later and are taken home by their parents. On the way home, Athena spots Zephan kneeling on a rock with the police standing behind him. She tells her mother to stop, then runs out of the car with her mother chasing after her. Before she reaches the spot, the police shoot Zephan in the head. Upon hearing the shot, Atheena stops in shock realising he's dead and her mother takes her home. Meanwhile, as a final request, Zephan had asked the police to enrol his daughter Jenny in Malgudi School and mentioned there are two children who would take care of her. Later, Atheena and Milan can be seen on a bench with Zephan's daughter Jenny.

== Cast ==
- Anoop Menon as Zephan, the mysterious man
- Bhama as Janet
- Janaki Menon as Atheena
- Vishal Krishna as Milan
- Priyanka Nair as Swathy
- Saiju Kurup as Sub. Inspector Manu Varma
- T P Madhavan as Principal
- Irshad as Maoist Sudarshan
- Sathyadev as Akbar Khan, Commando Officer
- Noby Marcose as School Security Guard

== Production ==
Pre-production work started in January 2015, and the principal photography commenced on 9 July 2015. With locations in Munnar, Peerumedu, Vagamon, Mont Fort School at Yercaud and Trivandrum, the shooting was completed in 35 days. Despite its title, the film is not related to the short story collection by R. K. Narayan.

== Awards ==
Janaki Menon won the Best Child Actor (Female) at 46th Kerala State Film Awards for portraying the character of Atheena. Vishal Krishna and Janaki Menon won Best Child artists Kerala Film Critics Association Awards for portraying the character of Milan and Atheena.

== Reception ==
Paresh C Palicha critic of Rediff.com gave 2 stars out of 5 and stated that " Malgudi Days tries to say too much but fails to convey anything.". Sanjith Sidhardhan critic of The Times of India gave 2 stars out 5 and stated that " While Malgudi Days has its tense moments, you wouldn't mind giving this one a miss."
