= Kurukkan =

2023 Malayalam film by Jayalal Divakaran

- Theatrical release poster
- Directed by: Jayalal Divakaran
- Written by: Manoj Ramsingh
- Produced by: Maha Subair
- Starring: Vineeth Sreenivasan; Shine Tom Chacko; Sreenivasan
- Cinematography: Jibu Jacob
- Edited by: Ranjan Abraham
- Music by: Unni Elayaraja
- Production company: Varnachithra Productions
- Distributed by: Varnachitra Big Screen
- Release date: 27 July 2023
- Running time: 123 minutes (Note: According to the British Board of Film Classification, the duration is 123 minutes and 11 seconds. According to the Central Board of Film Certification, the duration is 124 minutes and 51 seconds.)
- Country: India
- Language: Malayalam

Kurukkan (transl. Fox) is a 2023 Indian Malayalam-language crime comedy drama film directed by Jayalal Divakaran (in his directorial debut) and produced by Maha Subair. The film stars Vineeth Sreenivasan, Shine Tom Chacko, and Sreenivasan in the lead roles. In the film, Inspector Dinesh investigates the death of a social media celebrity and implicates a suspect in the case, which eventually leads to the disclosure of reality.

Principal photography began in November 2022 in Kochi and was wrapped up in December 2022. Unni Elayaraja composed the music, while the cinematography and editing were handled by Jibu Jacob and Ranjan Abraham.

Kurukkan was released in theatres on 27 July 2023 and underperformed at the box office.

== Plot ==
Circle inspector Dinesh K. T. of the Gandhi Nagar police station is in charge of the investigation into the death of Neenu, a celebrity model and social media influencer. As part of the investigation, he questions Anjitha, Neenu's roommate, and Bhagat, Neenu's manager. Meanwhile, Commissioner Balachandran K. informs Dinesh that the case investigation must be concluded soon, or it will be handed over to the Crime Branch.

Dinesh instructs his subordinates, SI Sajad Hassan and SI Reena Mathew, to call Hari, who delivers the newspaper to Neenu's house every morning, to the police station. Through Hari's interrogation, Dinesh learns that he was a cyber security analyst for an IT company and is currently preparing to launch his own start-up. After interrogation, Hari is allowed to go. But Dinesh suspects Hari of murdering Neenu. He informs Sajad and Reena that Hari was fired for assaulting the CEO of the company for which he worked and that he was the only one in the area when Neenu died. However, Sajad and Reena suggest Hari should be detained only once adequate proof is obtained.

Meanwhile, Dinesh's friend Manoj from Yellow News informs him that two people are in a hotel bearing drugs. Dinesh, looking for an opportunity to boost his image, arrests a lady and a young man from the hotel room the following day. However, upon examination at the police station, it was found that their bag contained gypsum powder. Dinesh, ashamed in front of everyone, makes some decisions in his mind. Dinesh talks with a defense lawyer to consider implicating Hari in the case. The lawyer supports him and instructs him to proceed with the arrest. Dinesh convinces Commissioner Balachandran as well. A police team led by Dinesh arrests Hari, who was preparing to take the PSC exam.

The police present Krishnan Rajasekharan, a documentator who frequently appears in court to falsely testify, as a witness. In the presence of the commissioner, Krishnan makes a false statement. Though Hari emotionally responded to it, he was taken to jail. At jail, Hari is beaten up by a group of accused, and the police take him to the hospital. During the commissioner's visit, Hari escapes from the hospital in an ambulance. Dinesh scares Krishnan by telling him about Hari's anger toward him for falsely testifying. Arya, Hari's lover, helps him hide in a warehouse owned by Ahammad. While staying there, he organizes the numbers of Dinesh, Krishnan, and other inspectors. Hari then threatens Krishnan over the phone, telling him that he must file an affidavit in court.

With the help of Arya and Ahammad, Hari gets Krishnan's mobile from a truck, retrieves its deleted call history, and locates him. Hari and Arya arrive at the Cochin Tower hotel after learning that Krishan is staying there. Krishnan, however, manages to escape after seeing them in front of his room. Hari chases Krishnan to the Palarivattom metro station but fails to catch him. On Krishnan's information, a police team led by Dinesh arrives at the metro station, but Hari smartly escapes.

While traveling, Hari's vehicle was involved in a minor accident. This information was passed by the traffic police to the control room, where Sajad and Krishnan were present. Hari and Ahammad grab an autorickshaw and escape the scene of the accident. The traffic SI tells Sajad the name of the autorickshaw by checking the CCTV visuals. Knowing Hari is traveling in his friend Manaf's autorickshaw, Krishnan calls him and tells him of the situation. Manaf then turns his autorickshaw onto a narrow road, where police arrest Hari. But Dinesh arrives and takes credit for catching Hari.

At court, the defense lawyer portrays Hari as a suspect based on circumstantial evidence. Hari defends himself without a lawyer. With clear evidence, he proves that the statements given by Anjitha and Krishnan against him were fake. Hari then questions Dinesh and proves his relationship with Neenu. Their WhatsApp chats, CCTV footage, and personal videos are produced as proof. Dinesh's wife Bincy George, also testifies against him. But Dinesh screams and says that he had nothing to do with Neenu's death. Dinesh is arrested for accusing Hari, along with Krishnan, who falsely testified in court.

== Cast ==
- Vineeth Sreenivasan as CI Dinesh K.T.
- Sreenivasan as Krishnan Rajasekharan alias Vendor Krishnan
- Shine Tom Chacko as Hariprasad
- Srikant Murali as Judge Kurup
- Gowri Nandha as Bincy George
- Malavika Menon as Arya
- Dileep Menon as Public Prosecutor
- Sudheer Karamana as Defense Lawyer
- Aswath Lal as SI Sajad Hassan
- Sruthy Jayan as SI Reena Mathew
- Joji Mundakayam as Balachandran K. IPS, Commissioner of Police
- Mareena Michael Kurisingal as Neenu
- Ansiba Hassan as Anjitha
- Balaji Sharma as Vishwambharan
- Krishnan Balakrishnan as Sathyanathan
- Azees Nedumangad as Manaf, a driver
- Nandan Unni as Manager Bhagat
- Anjali Sathyanath as Bangalore lady
- Arjun as Bangalore boy
- Sohan Seenulal as Neenu's neighbour
- Nissar as Benjamin
- Shaji Marad as Inspector Prasanth
- Tajuddin as Ahammad
- Manoj Ramsingh as Manoj Yellow News
- Sujaya Parvathy as Sujaya, a reporter

== Production ==
=== Filming ===
The film marks the reunion of Vineeth Sreenivasan and Sreenivasan following Aravindante Athidhikal (2018). Principal photography commenced in Kochi on 6 November 2022 with a pooja ceremony and switch-on delivered by Lokanath Behera at St. Albert's HSS, Ernakulam. Tamima Nasrin lit the Nilavilakku, while M. Mohanan gave the first clap. The filming wrapped on 20 December 2022.

=== Marketing ===
On 1 April 2023, the makers unveiled a first-look poster featuring Vineeth Sreenivasan, Sreenivasan, and Shine Tom Chacko. A second-look poster was released on 16 June 2023.

== Soundtrack ==
Kurukkan

Soundtrack album by Unni Elayaraja
- Released: 2023
- Venue: Kochi
- Studio: My Studio
- Genre: Feature film soundtrack
- Length: 12:09
- Language: Malayalam
- Label: Satyam Audios
- Producer: Unni Elayaraja
External videos
- Kurukkan Video Songs Jukebox on YouTube

Unni Elayaraja composed the film's music, with lyrics written by Manu Manjith and Shafi Kollam.

Track listing
No.	Title	Lyrics	Singer(s)	Length
1.	"Eeswaran Lunchinu"	Manu Manjith	Athul Narukara	3:45
2.	"Ayn Thudir Ya" (Arabic Song)	Shafi Kollam	Girish Thiruvali	2:11
3.	"Thee Kathana Kannalivan"	Manu Manjith	Vineeth Sreenivasan	2:33
4.	"Subha Vibhathamayi"	Manu Manjith	K. S. Harisankar	3:40

== Release ==
=== Theatrical ===
The film was given a U certificate by the Censor Board prior to its release. It was released in theatres on 27 July 2023 by Varnachitra Big Screen.

=== Home media ===
ManoramaMAX acquired the digital distribution rights and began streaming it on 25 August 2023. The satellite rights of the film was obtained by Mazhavil Manorama.

== Reception ==
=== Critical response ===
Gopika ls of The Times of India gave 3 out of 5 stars and wrote "Kurukkan by Jayalal Divakaran is a mixture of comedy, murder mystery, and investigation, at a time when genre lines are being breached in the most unconventional ways." S. R. Praveen of The Hindu wrote "Keeping you on the edge of the seat is not one of the stated purposes of Jayalal Divakaran's 'Kurukkan', scripted by Manoj Ramsingh." Cris of The News Minute gave 2.5 out of 5 stars and wrote "Kurukkan is not poorly made. The scenes are straightforward, and at a little more than two hours, the script is not boring at all. But the writing fails in stretching out the idea."

Princy Alexander of Onmanorama wrote "Kurukkan aims to find the fox, and there's an element of surprise when the true nature of one of the characters is unravelled." Vignesh Madhu of The New Indian Express wrote "What promised to be an intriguing character study of three like-minded men ends up as a lacklustre crime-comedy... with only a handful of comedies worth remembering."
