= Thirakkatha =

- Theatrical Release Poster
- Directed by: Ranjith
- Written by: Ranjith
- Screenplay by: Ranjith
- Story by: Ranjith
- Produced by: Ranjith, Maha Subair
- Starring: Prithviraj Sukumaran; Anoop Menon; Priyamani
- Narrated by: Prithviraj Sukumaran
- Cinematography: M. J. Radhakrishnan
- Edited by: Vijay Shankar
- Music by: Sharreth
- Distributed by: Varnachithra Big Screen
- Release date: 12 September 2008
- Running time: 120 minutes
- Country: India
- Language: Malayalam

Thirakkatha (transl. Screenplay) is a 2008 Malayalam romantic drama film co-produced, written, and directed by Ranjith. The film is a tribute to the yesteryear actresses who had been graceful, popular figures in cinema during their younger age with patronage and later got completely disregarded by the industry, media, and the masses alike.

Ranjith emphasized that the film should be seen as a work of fiction and not as the real-life story of Srividya or any other actress. The story shifts between the present and flashbacks through the perspective of different characters. It is divided into three monologues which meet in the climax. The film garnered positive reviews from critics and audiences alike.

The film won the National Film Award for Best Feature Film in Malayalam (Ranjith and Maha Subair) and Priyamani won the Filmfare Awards South for Best Actress.

== Plot ==
Akbar Ahmed alias Akky is a film director. After his highly successful first film, he becomes the most sought after director in the Malayalam film industry. Akbar and his girlfriend, Devayani, along with a group of friends share a passion for cinema. Akbar directed and produced his first film with them, which went on to become a huge success. He also runs a cafe called Casablanca named after the classic Hollywood film. For him, cinema is not a job, it is his passion. Akbar decides to choose a very different kind of story for his second film and sets on a journey in search of it.

Akbar decides to base his second film on the life of yesteryear actress Malavika, who was once a very popular actress and whose present whereabouts are unknown. Akbar and his friends go tracking down Malavika's biography. Her husband, Ajayachandran, is the reigning superstar of the industry. Akbar starts his search at the house of film director Aby Kuruvilla. Kuruvilla's son gives his father's old letters and diaries to Akbar from which he starts learning about the whirlwind romance of Malavika and Ajayachandran which led to marriage. How differences between them led to a breakup and how this affected their careers along with Akbar's efforts to find Malavika form the major plot of the film. The film ends in a touching climax with a poetic narration.

== Cast ==
- Priyamani as Malavika
- Prithviraj Sukumaran as Akbar Ahammed
- Anoop Menon as Ajayachandran
- Samvrutha Sunil as Devayani
- Ranjith as Director Aby Kuruvilla
- Praveena as Meera
- Arun as Narendran
- Nishanth Sagar as Kevin
- Nandu as Krishnamoorthy
- Siddharth Siva as Sathya
- Surabhi Lakshmi as Valarmathi
- Augustine as Chackochan

== Reception ==
The film was received well by audiences and critics alike. Some of the major reviews in the media were all praises for the film. Nowrunning.com opined that "It is a charming film that's plainly life-affirming without being overly pretentious or markedly melodramatic". Paresh C Palicha at Rediff.com opined that "It is exciting to see Ranjith bounce back to form with his best effort so far." Almost all reviewers were unanimous about the brilliant performances of the lead stars, especially of Priyamani, Anoop Menon and Prithviraj.

== Accolades ==
2008 : Film Awards

National Film Awards

- National Film Award for Best Feature Film in Malayalam

Kerala State Film Awards

- Kerala State Film Award for Second Best Actor -Anoop Menon
- Best Makeup - Ranjith Ambadi

Filmfare Awards South

- Filmfare Award for Best Actress - Malayalam - Priyamani
- Best Film Malayalam
- Best Director - Ranjith
- Best Music Director - Sharath
- Best Female Playback Singer - K. S. Chithra

== Music ==
The score and soundtrack of the movie were composed by Sharreth, who returned to the field after a long gap.

Thirakkatha

Soundtrack album by Sharreth
- Released: 14 August 2008
- Recorded: 2008
- Genre: Soundtrack
- Length: 31:59
- Label: Anak Audio
- Producer: Sharreth

Sharreth chronology
Shyaamam (2006)	Thirakkatha (2008)	Kalavaramaye Madilo (2009)

Track-List
No.	Title	Lyrics	Singer(s)	Length
1.	"Arikil Nee Illa" (Male)	Rafeeq Ahammed	Madhu Balakrishnan	3:15
2.	"Oduvil Oru" ((Female) (Won Best Filmfare Award for Best Female Playback Singer – Malayalam))	Rafeeq Ahammed	K. S. Chithra	4:10
3.	"Paalapoovithalil"	Rafeeq Ahammed	Shweta Mohan, Nishad	4:29
4.	"Manjuneeril" (Version 1)	Rafeeq Ahammed	Kalpana	4:25
5.	"Onnondonnu Chernu"	Rafeeq Ahammed	Ranjini Haridas, Shankar Mahadevan	3:51
6.	"Arikil Nee Illa" (Female)	Rafeeq Ahammed	Teenu Tellence	3:15
7.	"Oduvil Oru" (Male)	Rafeeq Ahammed	Sharreth	4:09
8.	"Manjuneeril" (Version 2)	Rafeeq Ahammed	Kalpana	4:25
Total length:				31:59
