= Rakshadhikari Baiju Oppu =

2017 film by Ranjan Pramod

- Theatrical release poster
- Directed by: Ranjan Pramod
- Written by: Ranjan Pramod
- Story by: Arjun T. S.
- Produced by: Alexander Mathew
- Starring: Biju Menon; Aju Varghese; Hareesh Perumanna
- Cinematography: Prasanth Raveendran
- Edited by: Samjith Mohammed
- Music by: Bijibal
- Production company: 100th Monkey Movies
- Distributed by: 100th Monkey Movies
- Release date: 21 April 2017
- Country: India
- Language: Malayalam

Rakshadhikari Baiju Oppu (transl. Patron Baiju, Signature) is a 2017 Indian Malayalam-language comedy-drama film written and directed by Ranjan Pramod and produced by 100th Monkey Movies. It stars Biju Menon in the lead role with Aju Varghese and Hannah Reji Koshy playing supporting roles. The songs and background score are composed by Bijibal. The plot follows Baiju, a local sports club patron, as he tries to resolve various issues in their village in Kerala.

Rakshadhikari Baiju Oppu was released in India on 21 April 2017. The film won three Kerala State Film Awards—Best Film with Popular Appeal and Aesthetic Value, Best Sync Sound (for Smijith Kumar), and Best Child Artist (for Nakshatra).

== Plot ==
The story revolves around a middle-aged man, Baiju, who works as a government employee and patron of a local arts and sports club.

== Cast ==
- Biju Menon as Baiju Kumbalam
- Aju Varghese as Unni
- Sankar Induchoodan as Hari Kumbalam
- Deepak Parambol as Manoj
- Hareesh Perumanna as Velu
- Hannah Reji Koshy as Ajitha
- Anagha as Rosy
- Krishna Padmakumar as Sreekala
- Janardhanan as Narayanan
- Ambika Mohan as Narayanan's Wife
- Indrans as Vilasan
- Vijayaraghavan as Balakrishnan, Baiju's father
- Dileesh Pothan as George
  - Arun Paul as young George
- Padmaraj Ratheesh as Chandran
- Alencier Ley Lopez as Surendran
- Nebish Benson as Alvin
- Manikandan Pattambi as Alvin's Father
- Divya M Nair as Alvin's Mother
- Sasi Kalinga
- Anjali Aneesh as Bijila, Baiju's Sister
- Sreedhanya as Nirmala
- Koottickal Jayachandran as Panchayath Member
- Pauly Valsan as Sharadha, cleaning staff
- Chethan Jayalal
- Ayman Abdulla as Rohit
- Aabid Nassar as Abhi
- Nakshathra Manoj as Babitha, Baiju's daughter
- Master Vishal Krishna as Rithik
- Hakim Shahjahan as Josemon
- Indian Pallassery as Akhil
- K.T.S. Padannayil
- Neeraja as Lalitha

== Production ==
The production of the movie started on 6 October 2016.

== Release and reception ==
Rakshadhikari Baiju Oppu was released on 21 April 2017. After a slow start at the box office, it soon picked up pace and reportedly collected ₹ 8.32 crore in 21 days. The film completed 100 days in theatres and fetched ₹ 23.6 crore gross.

Critical reviews of the film have been mostly positive. Lauding the film as a feel-good entertainer, Mythili Ramachandran of Gulf News wrote: "Rakshadhikari Baiju is a refreshing film with its characters leaving behind a nice feeling." Veeyen also gave a positive review, writing, "Clever, enjoyable, witty and poignant by turns, ‘Rakshadhikari Baiju Oppu’ is an entertaining character drama with a subtle, pertinent note concealed within its folds."

Baradwaj Rangan of Film Companion South wrote "Baiju is beautifully shot and edited. The frames are dense – there's always something happening in the background. The camera could change its focus, and there'd be another set of lives, another set of stories to follow."

== Music ==
The music album was released by the label Millennium audios.

1. "Mohabathin Munthirineere" - Bijibal, Bhavana Vijayan, Rakesh Brahmanandan
2. "Njaanee Oonjaalil" - P. Jayachandran, Chithra Arun
3. "Aakaasham Panthalu Ketti" - Sudeep Kumar
4. "Vellilappoovine" - Anakha Sadan
5. "Raasaathi Ivan" - Anuradha Sriram
6. "Jeevithamennathu" - Arun Alat
7. "Kathiravanivide" - Bhavya Lakshmi, Bijibal
