= Randam Bhavam =

2001 film by Lal Jose

- VCD cover
- Directed by: Lal Jose
- Written by: Ranjan Pramod
- Produced by: K. Mohanan (Seven Arts Mohan)
- Starring: Suresh Gopi; Biju Menon; Thilakan; Poornima Mohan; Narendra Prasad
- Cinematography: S. Kumar; Vipin Mohan
- Edited by: Ranjan Abraham
- Music by: Vidyasagar
- Production company: Jayatara
- Distributed by: Amma Arts; Sagar Movies; Rajasree Films Release
- Release date: 14 April 2001
- Running time: 160 minutes
- Country: India
- Language: Malayalam

Randam Bhavam (transl. Second persona) is a 2001 Indian Malayalam-language crime drama film directed by Lal Jose and written by Ranjan Pramod. It stars Suresh Gopi in a dual role along with Thilakan, Biju Menon, Poornima Mohan, Lena, Narendra Prasad, Lal and Srividya in pivotal roles.

== Plot ==
The film begins with Police Officer Jeevan taking charge of Mangalore city Police. He learns from his subordinate Sudhakaran Nair that the city is still ruled by an underworld don Harigovindan alias Govindji. Navaneethakrishnan alias Kishanji is Govindji's lead henchman and a right-hand man. Govindji acts as a sort of Godfather to him. Kishan has a face-off with Jeevan and Jeevan gets injured in the fight. Jeevan later is surprised to see Kishan during a train journey but it turns out that it is Ananthakrishnan alias Ananthu, Kishan's identical twin, who, unlike Kishan, is a well-educated lecturer and righteous person. Jeevan visits their family home in Kerala to confirm the facts. He learns that Kishan, despite being from a well-off family and a topper at school, ran off during his teenage and joined the gangs of Mangalore owing to a punishing father. Jeevan also meets Kishan's uncle and his daughter Manikkutty who is Ananthu's fiancée.

Back in Mangalore, Jeevan meets Govindji and he introduce Jeevan to his lawyer as the officer responsible for destroying Pune underworld and as the son of former DGP Chandrasekharan Nair. Later, it is hinted that Govindji is responsible for the death of Jeevan's father and Jeevan is seeking revenge. Kishan's best friend Muhammed Ibrahim works for Mahendra Reddy, the leader of the rival gang. Despite this, they keep their friendship alive.

Kishan lives in a flat provided by Govindji and has a deep relation with neighbouring family of Akhila and her mother, whom he calls Mommy. Akhila is in love with Kishan but he wears a stern face to hide his love. Ananthu visits Kishan at his flat and befriends Akhila. Kishan becomes visibly jealous with the affection and respect that Akhila shows to Ananthu. Ananthu requests Kishan to return home, however Kishan refuses as he still strongly hates his father. Kishan murders Mehaboob, a close associate of Muhammed Ibrahim which upsets him greatly. Jeevan counsels Muhammed and he provides information on Reddy's secret godowns. Jeevan raids the godowns and arrests Reddy. Govindji senses danger and he convinces Kishan to kill Muhammed Ibrahim which he does with a single shot from behind with great grief. Back home, Kishan finds 'Mommy' murdered and realizes that Govindji has ordered the hit. Kishan visits Govindji and gets furious with him. He kills the man who murdered Mommy and quits the gang. In response Govindji puts out a 'shoot at sight' order against Kishan. Jeevan learns this and tries to protect Kishan. Meanwhile, Ananthu arrives in Mangalore to pursue Kishan to attend their sister's wedding. Jeevan manages to find Kishan but Ananthu is killed in front of them by Govindji's men. Jeevan and Akhila convince Kishan to pretend as Ananthu so as to escape Govindji. Kishan, Jeevan and Akhila take Ananthu's body back to Kerala. At home, he finds his parents grieving his death. After the funeral, Jeevan returns while Akhila stays for a few more days. Kishan tries to be Ananthu, without knowing anything about him. He finds it very difficult and goes lonely most of the time. He takes a long leave from college and also understands how much his father loves him. Also, his mother reveals to him that she had understood his identity at first sight.

Back in Mangalore, Govindji finds a new hitman and kills Reddy to destroy evidence against him. Jeevan visits Kishan and request his assistance to destroy Govindji. He tries to provoke Kishan to seek revenge for his brother's death. However, Kishan refuses to help as he is trying to carry on his new life. Ananthu gets honoured by a national award for his contributions to bird watching. Kishan finds it difficult to face the press interviews following the award. He reveals the truth to his uncle. Meanwhile, Govindji reads about the award and learns that Kishan has a twin brother. He gets alerted immediately and visits Kishan's house pretending to give a compensation to the family for his former employee. Kishan handles the situation well, but Govindji's doubt remains. Govindji abducts Akhila and learns that Kishan is the one who is alive and tries to get Kishan come back to Mangalore. Finally, Kishan decides to go and his father also learns the truth. He arrives in Mangalore and takes hand in hand with Jeevan. They capture all of Govindji's men in a single night and raids all of his hideouts. Kishan comes to Govindji's bungalow and rescues Akhila while Govindji stands alone helpless. Kishan tells Govindji that he is defeated but does not want to kill him. He hands his gun to Govindji. But instead of killing Kishan, Govindji commits suicide with the gun.

== Cast ==
- Suresh Gopi in a dual role as:
  - Navaneetha Krishnan "Kichu" (Kishanji)
  - Anantha Krishnan "Ananthu"
- Thilakan as Harigovindan "Govindji", a Mafia Don
- Biju Menon as Mangaluru City Police Commissioner Jeevan IPS
- Lal as Mohammed Ibrahim
- Poornima Mohan as Akhila, Kichu's love interest
- Lena as Manikutty, Ananthu's fiancée
- Nedumudi Venu as Prof. Kurup, Kichu's and Ananthu's uncle, Manikutty's father
- Narendra Prasad as Haridas, Kichu's and Ananthu's father
- Srividya as Kichu's and Ananthu's mother
- Janardhanan as DIG Sathyaprathapan IPS
- Oduvil Unnikrishnan as Adv. Subramanian Potti, Govindji's lawyer
- Sukumari as Akhila's mother
- Bala Singh as Mahendra Reddy, a Mafia Don and rival of Govindji
- Sadiq as SI Sudhakaran Nair
- Augustine as Pushpangadan, Govindji's and Kishan's driver
- Nadirshah as Mehaboob
- Baburaj as Shetty
- Nandu Pothuval as Subhramanyan, a gangster working for Mahendra Reddy
- Motta Rajendran as a gangster working for Mahendra Reddy
- Kaviraj as Muttaiah, a gangster working for Govindji

== Soundtrack ==
Randam Bhavam

Soundtrack album by Vidyasagar
- Released: 2 September 2001
- Recorded: Varsha Vallaki Studios
- Genre: Feature Film Soundtrack
- Length: 28:06
- Language: Malayalam
- Label: Satyam Audios
- Producer: Vidyasagar

The music and background score for the film was composed by Vidyasagar, with lyrics penned by Gireesh Puthenchery.

Song title	Singers
"Amma Nakshathrame"	K. J. Yesudas
"Danapparappara"	Mano, Vidhu Prathap, Dileep
"Kiss Lamhe Ki"	Hariharan
"Marannittumenthino"	P. Jayachandran, Sujatha Mohan
"Marannittum"	P. Jayachandran
"Randam Bhavam"	Suresh Peters
"Ven Prave"	K. J. Yesudas

== Reception ==
A critic from indiainfo wrote that "Lal Jose has come up with a storyline, which is as ancient as the Cinema itself".

The film had a lukewarm reception at the box-office, although the songs were well received. The song 'Marannittumenthino' is still very popular among Keralites. However, the film had a surge in popularity since it has been released on DVD and when it was started airing on television. Many consider this to be one of the best action-drama films of the decade acclaiming performance of Suresh Gopi and Thilakan. The direction of Lal Jose was also praised.
