= Manassinakkare =

2003 Indian Malayalam film by Sathyan Anthikad

- VCD cover
- Directed by: Sathyan Anthikad
- Written by: Ranjan Pramod
- Produced by: Maha Subair
- Starring: Jayaram; Sheela; Nayanthara; Innocent; Siddique
- Cinematography: Alagappan N
- Edited by: K. Rajagopal
- Music by: Ilaiyaraaja
- Distributed by: Varnachithra
- Release date: 25 December 2003 (Kerala)
- Running time: 155 minutes
- Country: India
- Language: Malayalam

Manassinakkare (trans. On the Other Shore of the Mind) is a 2003 Indian Malayalam family drama film directed by Sathyan Anthikad and written by Ranjan Pramod. It stars Jayaram, Sheela, and Nayanthara in lead roles, while Innocent, Oduvil Unnikrishnan, K. P. A. C. Lalitha, Siddique, Sukumari, Nedumudi Venu, and Mammukoya play supporting roles. The film's score and soundtrack were composed by Ilayaraja. The film marked the return of Sheela as an actress and the film debut of Nayanthara. It won five awards at Filmfare Awards South.

== Plot ==
Kochu Thresia is a rich widow living a retired life in a quaint but beautiful village called Kinassery, filled with eclectic characters. Her children and children-in-laws are tired of Thresia's eccentricities, which they consider bad behavior for a woman of her age; they think she is a nuisance who creates unnecessary trouble for them in their busy lives. Though old, Thresia is still young at heart and knows how to enjoy life, getting into humorous predicaments which further incense her grown-up children. They only tolerate her as much of the family property is still in her name.

It is during this time that Kochu Thresia meets Reji, a young, down-to-earth farmer, who lives with his alcoholic but playful father Chacko Mappila. Kochu Thresia finds a sympathetic and understanding friend in Reji and his young neighbour Gowri, and starts seeing him like a son. Reji eagerly fulfils her wishes, including riding on an elephant, playing cards, watching movies.They enjoy their time together.

However, their friendship becomes a displeasure to her family, and she finds herself getting further and further alienated from them. Reji's life also takes a turn when Chacko Mappila suddenly passes away, leaving him alone. Kochu Thresia helps Reji and Gowri realize their mutual interest and unites them.

After a few more problems in her home and further realizations, Kochu Thresia finally decides to bring a closure to everything. She calls all her children and reveals that she has decided to sell all her assets and properties to whichever of her children can pay her a particular amount. After a bit of a tussle, the elder son Tony buys all the properties from Kochu Thresia, who decides to leave the family home, wishing to no longer be a burden, nor keep any more relations, finally standing up for herself.

While sitting alone in an old hut which she and her husband Mathukutty first built when they came to Kinaserry, Kochu Thresia is visited by Reji, who asks if she wants to come live with him and Gowri. Kochu Thresia, overwhelmed by Reji's unconditional love for her, agrees, and they both ride off to his home as a new day dawns.

== Cast ==
- Sheela as Kombanakattu Kochu Thresia
- Jayaram as Reji Chacko
- Nayanthara as Gouri Maneeram Kandath
- Innocent as Thekkethalaickal Chacko Mappila
- Siddique as Tony Kutty
- KPAC Lalitha as Kunju Maria
- Oduvil Unnikrishnan as Sreedharan
- Sukumari as Shantha
- Nedumudi Venu as Kuriakose "Kuriyappi
- Sona Nair as Sherry Kuriakose, Kochu Tresia's daughter
- Madhupal as Party Leader Benny Kombodokkan
- Rajesh Hebbar as George Kombanakkadan
- Reshmi Nambiar as Molly Aunty, Tony's wife
- Reena as Sherly Kombanakkadan
- Anitha Nair as Reetha George
- Mamukoya as Kunji Khader
- T. P. Madhavan as Advocate Charlie
- Santhakumari as Kochuthressia's house asst.
- Manikandan Pattambi as Philipose, a politician
- Joju George as Shaju, a politician
- Shivaji as CI of Police
- Ottapalam Pappan as Chandy
- Dinesh Prabhakar as Rameshan
- Vijayan Peringod as Kelu Police
- Salu Kootanadu as coconut climber Satheesan
- Prem Nazir as Mathukkutty (Archive footage)

== Production ==
Manassinakkare was Nayanthara's debut film. During pre-production, Sathyan cast every major character except the role of Gowi, for which he sought a newcomer to keep Sheela as the major attraction in the cast. Filming was in Pattambi, Palakkad, with the major location being the house of Kochu Thresia. Since Gauri's scenes were not involved in the house, Sathyan started filming hoping he could find a cast before wrapping. During one of the filming days, he was reading Vanitha magazine and was struck by Nayanthara's picture in a jewellery advertisement. She was contacted and cast as Gauri.

== Soundtrack ==
Manassinakkare

Soundtrack album by Ilaiyaraaja
- Released: 17 November 2003
- Studios: Prasad Digital, Chennai
- Genre: Film
- Language: Malayalam
- Label: Satyam Audios

The film features songs composed by Ilaiyaraaja and written by Gireesh Puthenchery.

Track	Song title	Singer	Raga
1	"Melleyonnu"	K. J. Yesudas, Jyotsna	Pahadi
2	"Marakkudayaal"	M. G. Sreekumar, Chorus	Keeravani
3	"Thankathinkal Vaanil"	Vijay Yesudas, Asha G. Menon, Chorus	Gambhiranata
4	"Chellathathe"	K. S. Chithra	
5	"Chendaykkoru Kolundeda"	P. Jayachandran, M. G. Sreekumar	
6	"Melleyonnu"	K. J. Yesudas	Pahadi
7	"Chellathathe"	K. S. Chithra, Biju Narayanan	

== Reception ==
A critic from Deccan Herald wrote: "Shot mostly around the beautiful locations of Thodupuzha, Sathyan Anthikad's Manassinakkare is a beautiful mix of emotional situations and comic interlude".

== Box office ==
The film was a commercial success and ran for more than 200 days in theatres.

== Awards ==
Filmfare Awards South

- Best Film - Maha Subair
- Best Director - Sathyan Anthikkad
- Best Music Director - Ilaiyaraaja
- Best Actor - Jayaram
- Filmfare Award for Best Supporting Actress – Malayalam - K. P. A. C. Lalitha

Asianet Film Awards

- Best Director - Sathyan Anthikkad
- Best Male Playback Singer - M. G. Sreekumar
- Best Makeup Artist - Pandyan
- Best New Face of the Year - (Female) - Nayanthara

Kerala Film Critics Awards

- Best Dubbing Artist Female - Sreeja for Nayantara
