= Kurukkante Kalyanam =

1982 Indian film by Sathyan Anthikad

- Theatrical release poster
- Directed by: Sathyan Anthikad
- Written by: P. Balakrishnan
- Produced by: Rasheeda Rasheed
- Starring: Sukumaran; Madhavi
- Cinematography: Anandakuttan
- Edited by: G. Venkitaraman
- Music by: Zero Babu; Guna Singh
- Production company: Riyas Films
- Distributed by: Soori Films
- Release date: 12 November 1982
- Running time: 120 minutes
- Country: India
- Language: Malayalam

Kurukkante Kalyanam (transl. Fox's wedding) is a 1982 Indian Malayalam-language comedy film directed by Sathyan Anthikad (in his directorial debut) and written by P. Balakrishnan. The film revolves about a shy, timid, and introverted Sivasubrahmania Hariramachandran (Sukumaran), who falls head over heels for the petite and spunky Saritha (Madhavi), regardless of an age difference of 14 years.

The film features original songs composed by Zero Babu and a score by Guna Singh. The cinematography of the film was handled by Anandakuttan, while the editing was done by G. Venkitaraman. The film was remade in Tamil as Aavathellam Pennale starring S. Ve. Shekher.

== Plot ==
Sivasubrahmanian is 32-year-old, simple but shy man who still hasn't got over a rejection from his childhood, and is an unhappy bachelor. Desperate to break away from an overbearing and spiritually inclined father, he escapes to another town along with his best friend Kumar. He falls in love with Saritha, their new neighbor, 14 years junior to him. Saritha also happens to be his boss's daughter's best friend, who also stays in the same building. In the same building, their stays a nurse, who is a divorcee and this nurse falls for subramaniam and wants to marry him.

Meanwhile, Subramaniam's boss wife Amina doubts about the boss having an affair with the nurse. Kumar's uncle was a cook in the army, who also stays in the same building.

== Cast ==
- Sukumaran as Sivasubrahmania Hariramachandran
- Madhavi as Saritha
- Jagathy Sreekumar as Kumar
- Bahadoor as Soopi Hajiyar
- Nithya as Sainaba
- Mohanlal as Sainaba's husband
- Meena as Amina
- Sathaar as Gopi
- Sankaradi as Thrivikraman
- Paravoor Bharathan as Sankaran Nair
- Kunchan as Dilip Kumar

== Production ==
The film was shot on sets at Sathya Studios in Madras.

== Soundtrack ==
The music was composed by Zero Babu and the lyrics were written by Sathyan Anthikkad.

No.	Song	Singers	Lyrics	Length (m:ss)
1	"Anuragame En Jeevanilunaroo"	K. J. Yesudas	Sathyan Anthikkad	
2	"Manavaattippennorungi"	Vani Jairam	Sathyan Anthikkad	
3	"Ponnonathumbikalum Ponveyilum"	K. J. Yesudas	Sathyan Anthikkad	
