= Appunni =

1984 Indian film by Sathyan Anthikad

- Poster designed by Kitho
- Directed by: Sathyan Anthikad
- Written by: V. K. N.
- Produced by: Ramachandran
- Starring: Nedumudi Venu; Mohanlal; Menaka; Bharath Gopi; Sukumari
- Cinematography: Anandakuttan
- Edited by: G. Venkitaraman
- Music by: Kannur Rajan
- Production company: Revathi Productions
- Distributed by: Soori Films
- Release date: 17 March 1984
- Country: India
- Language: Malayalam

Appunni is a 1984 Indian Malayalam-language romantic comedy film directed by Sathyan Anthikad and written by V. K. N., based on his story Premavum Vivahavum. It is the only screenplay he has ever written. The film stars Nedumudi Venu in the title role, alongside Mohanlal, Menaka, Bharath Gopi, and Sukumari.

== Plot ==
Appunni is a simple and kind man who lives in a quiet village. He has loved Ammukutty since they were young, and people in the village know about their relationship. Ammukutty lives with her father, Ayyappan Nair, and her mother, Malu. Appunni spends his days taking part in ordinary village life and meeting people such as Adhikari, Hajiyar, Kurup Mash, Karunakaran, and Kalyani Amma. Their peaceful life begins to change when Ayyappan Nair finds another man whom he thinks would be a better husband for Ammukutty. This man is Menon Maashu, a schoolteacher who appears to have a better position in life. Ammukutty agrees to leave Appunni and marry Menon, which leaves Appunni hurt. As the wedding gets closer, village life continues around them, including local customs and the traditional Theyyam ritual.

On the wedding day, everyone waits for Menon, but he does not arrive on time. As the hours pass, Ayyappan Nair believes that Menon has cheated the family by not coming to the wedding. The family now faces the shame of having a wedding with no groom. Ayyappan Nair quickly turns back to Appunni and asks him to marry Ammukutty. Appunni agrees, and Appunni and Ammukutty are married. However, the situation changes again later that night when Menon finally arrives. Ayyappan Nair then changes his mind once more. Even though Ammukutty is already married to Appunni, her father wants her to leave Appunni and marry Menon instead.

Ammukutty now makes her own decision. She refuses to follow her father's new plan and does not leave Appunni for Menon. She shuts the door on Ayyappan Nair and Menon and chooses to stay with Appunni. The story therefore ends with Appunni and Ammukutty together after a series of changes in which Ammukutty was first expected to be with Appunni, then chose Menon, then married Appunni when Menon failed to arrive, and finally chose to remain with Appunni when Menon appeared after the wedding.

== Cast ==
- Nedumudi Venu as Appunni
- Mohanlal as Menon maashu
- Menaka as Ammukutty
- Bharath Gopi as Ayyappan Nair, Ammukutty's father
- Sankaradi as Adhikari
- Bahadoor as Hajiyar
- Sukumari as Malu, Ammukutty's mother
- Oduvil Unnikrishnan as Kurup Mash
- Kuthiravattam Pappu as Karunakaran
- Meena as Menon's mother
- Kuttyedathi Vilasini as Kalyani Amma

== Production ==
The screenplay was written by V. K. N., based on his story Premavum Vivahavum. Some characters were newly created for the film. The character Hajiyar was adapted from another of V. K. N.'s work. Appunni remains the only screenplay he has ever wrote.

The film's switch-on ceremony, marking the start of filming, was performed by author Vaikom Muhammad Basheer at V. K. N.'s suggestion, although V. K. N. himself did not attend the event.

== Soundtrack ==
The music was composed by Kannur Rajan and the lyrics were written by Bichu Thirumala.

No.	Song	Singers	Lyrics	Length (m:ss)
1	"Kinnaaram Tharivalayude"	Vani Jairam	Bichu Thirumala	
2	"Thoomanjin Thulli"	K. J. Yesudas	Bichu Thirumala	

== Release ==
The screenplay of Appunni was published by Mathrubhumi Books.
