= Achuvinte Amma =

2005 Indian film

- Poster
- Directed by: Sathyan Anthikad
- Screenplay by: Ranjan Pramod
- Story by: Rajesh Jayaraman
- Produced by: P. V. Gangadharan
- Starring: Urvashi; Meera Jasmine; Narain
- Cinematography: Alagappan N.
- Edited by: K. Rajagopal
- Music by: Ilaiyaraaja
- Production company: Grahalakshmi Productions
- Distributed by: Kalpaka Films Release
- Release date: 28 January 2005
- Running time: 162 minutes
- Country: India
- Language: Malayalam
- Budget: ₹65 lakhs

Achuvinte Amma (transl. Achu's mother) is a 2005 Indian Malayalam-language comedy drama film directed by Sathyan Anthikad and written by Ranjan Pramod from a story by Rajesh Jayaraman. It stars Urvashi, Meera Jasmine and Narain. The music is composed by Ilaiyaraaja. It was also a comeback movie for Urvashi in Malayalam after a gap of six years. The film has won several awards, including the National Film Award for Best Supporting Actress (Urvashi), Filmfare Award for Best Film - Malayalam, and Filmfare Award for Best Actress - Malayalam for Meera Jasmine.

== Plot ==
Vanaja is a single mother who lives with her daughter Ashwathy (Achu) a civil engineer and works as an insurance agent at LIC. Achu and her mother have a close relationship and never keep secrets from each other. One day, they meet Emmanuel John, known as Ijo who is an advocate, at a railway station in Trivandrum, where Achu has a job interview at a private firm. After this first meeting, Achu and Ijo run into each other periodically, developing a friendship, and eventually, a budding romance. Achu gets a job with a construction company and she and her mother's standard of living improves. She expresses her wish to marry Ijo to Vanaja. Vanaja wishes to meet Ijo's parents to learn more about him. Ijo takes them to a cemetery revealing that he is an orphan and his family had committed mass suicide due to a financial crisis, leaving him as the sole survivor. Vanaja suddenly changes her mind and opposes the marriage, saying she wants her daughter to get married into a big family where there would be many people who would care and help them when they were in need.

Vanaja's opposition shocks and infuriates Achu and she confronts Vanaja with questions about her father, leading to an argument. Vanaja refuses to reveal anything and Achu storms out. She ultimately decides to stay with Ijo, though he advised her to return home. Achu is adamant and remains with her friend. Meanwhile, Ijo tries to mend the relationship between Achu and her mother, but Achu doesn't listen to him.

Meanwhile, due to unforeseen circumstances, Achu has to leave her friend's place. Realizing that she has no place to stay, Achu loses hope and is met with a road accident. Vanaja rushes to see her in hospital but Achu still refuses to talk to her mother. Vanaja opens up to Ijo and tells him about her past. An old woman raised Vanaja, and after her death, Vanaja did odd jobs and worked as a laborer along with other adolescent girls. One day, all the girls Vanaja was working with were going to be transported for Flesh Trade. Vanaja, upon finding this out decided to run away instead and in the process came across a young girl with whom she escaped. Vanaja adopts the girl and names her Achu.

Vanaja tells Ijo that he should marry Achu as soon as possible, while Ijo promises to take good care of her. Ijo reveals the whole story to Achu. A few days later, Achu returns to Vanaja suffering from the utmost guilt and regret. As they reunite, it is revealed that Vanaja adopted another little girl as her daughter as well. Everyone happily reunites.

== Cast ==
- Urvashi as K.P. Vanaja, an LIC agent
  - Althara as young Vanaja
- Meera Jasmine as Aswathy / Achu
- Narain as Advocate Immanuel John (Ijo) (voiceover by Sarath Das)
- Innocent as Paulose
- K. P. A. C. Lalitha as Kunjala Chedathi
- Sukumari as Moothamma
- Oduvil Unnikrishnan as Abdullah
- P. Sreekumar as ASI Madhusoodhanan Pillai
- Vettukili Prakash as Kunjoy
- Anoop Chandran as Ijo's friend
- Pala Aravindan as Hospital Staff
- Valsala Menon as Kathreena
- Reshmi Boban as Usha
- Mahima as Ramla
- Anitha Nair as Smiley (Achu's neighbor & a serial actress)
- Manikandan Pattambi
- Vinod Kovoor as an employee in Paulose shop
- Lakshana as Rukhiya
- Nivedita
- Vijayan Peringode
- Ranjan Pramod as Co-traveller in bus (cameo)
- Suraj Venjaramoodu as Bus conductor
- Ambika Rao as Vanaja's Neighbour
- Dinesh Prabhakar as staff in bus

== Soundtrack ==
Achuvinte Amma

Soundtrack album by Ilaiyaraaja
- Released: January 2005
- Genre: Film
- Language: Malayalam
- Label: Manorama Music

The film features songs composed by Ilaiyaraaja and written by Gireesh Puthenchery.

Track	Song title	Singer(s)
1	"Thamarakuruvikku"	Manjari, Chorus
2	"Enthu Paranjaalum"	K. S. Chithra
3	"Swaasathin Thaalam"	K. J. Yesudas, Manjari
4	"Enthu Paranjaalum"	Vijay Yesudas

== Reception ==
=== Critical ===
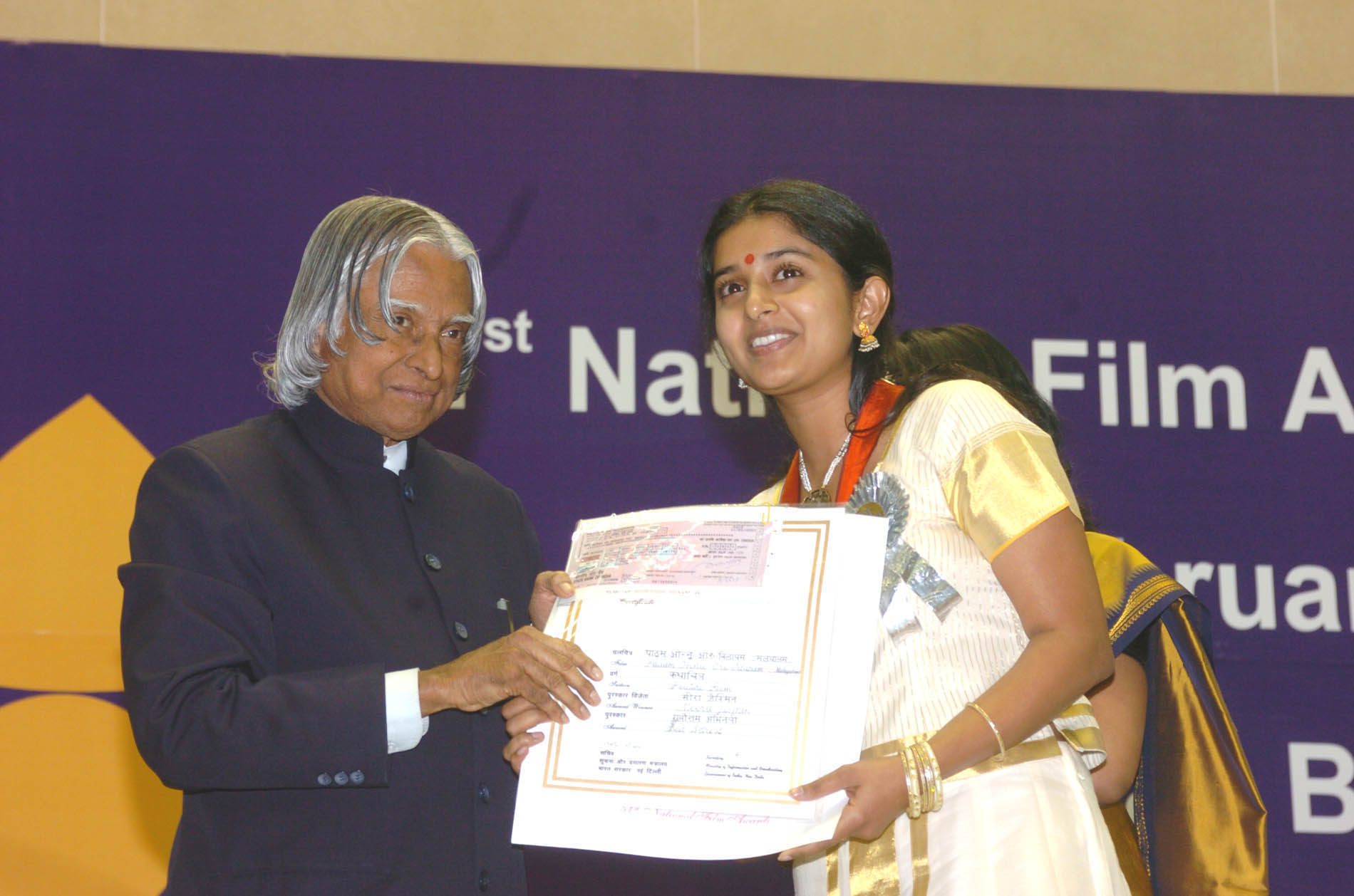
Meera Jasmine's (above) and Urvashi's (below) performance received praise. Urvashi went on to win the National Film Award for Best Supporting Actress.

The Hindu ranked it amongst the most critically acclaimed films of 2005. Reviewing the film for Now Running, Hari Krishnan gave the film 3 stars out of 5 and wrote, "Achuvintte Amma is a relevant subject that both scriptwriter and director dealt with very efficiently. Satyan Anthikkad reiterates that good films can win the heart of public and he is still with family-oriented subject, which has a moral value in the society." He also praised the performance of the lead cast writing, "Urvashi registers a brilliant comeback. Meera Jasmine excels with her natural performance and Sunil Kumar an upcoming star has long way to go. Actors like K. P. A. C Lalitha, Innocent, Sukumari and Oduvil Unnikrishnan supported the main actors very well." Oneindia gave the film 4 out of 5 stars and a Hit mark. Sify gave an "Above Average" verdict and wrote, "Satyan has succeeded in bringing out the bond between a young mother and her 20-year-old daughter effectively in the first half and laced it with some hilarious moments. But post interval, the story loses its track and the script goes haywire." They further added, "Though Achuvinte Amma has some flaws in its story telling method, that mars the tempo, the film is recommended for the sake of the one woman dynamo called Urvashi." Deccan Herald wrote "When the overall effect of a work of art invokes a desired impact, the fallacies may be forgiven. Achuvinte Amma could have been forgiven but for the final sequence".

In 2019, Neelima Menon of The News Minute criticizes the climax writing, "Urvashi's single mother not only has a bizarre backstory about rescuing the child and adopting her, we are also shown society's myopic reactions to her single status." Apunkachioce described Achuvinte Amma as an "eminently watchable film".

=== Theatrical ===
The film was commercially successful. It completed 200 days in noon show in Thiruvananthapuram and Kozhikode, at the state government run Kairali theatre. On 24 March 2006, Sreedhar Pillai of The Hindu wrote, "A film that ran for 200 days. It was a big hit, especially with women who thronged the theatres to watch her (Urvashi) play foster mother to Meera Jasmine." According to a trade analysis by Sify, Achuvinte Amma performed well in bigger cities than smaller ones. It managed to get a share of around ₹7 lakhs from Kairali theatre, Thiruvananthapuram in 40 days, while it only got distributors share of ₹1.1 lakhs in Kottayam. It was the only film of the year that was successful without featuring any major stars.

== Awards ==
National Film Awards

- 2006: Best Supporting Actress - Urvashi

Filmfare Awards South

- Filmfare Award for Best Film - P. V. Gangadharan
- Filmfare Award for Best Actress - Malayalam - Meera Jasmine
- Filmfare Award for Best Music Director - Malayalam - Ilaiyaraaja

Asianet Film Awards

- Asianet Film Awards for Best Film - P. V. Gangadharan
- Asianet Film Awards for Best Actress - Meera Jasmine
- Asianet Film Awards for Best Female Playback Singer - K.S.Chitra

Kerala State Film Awards

- Kerala State Film Award for Best Film with Popular Appeal and Aesthetic Value- P. V. Gangadharan, Sathyan Anthikkad
- Kerala State Film Award for Best Dubbing Artist - Sarath Das
