= Alexis Leon =

Indian software consultant and author

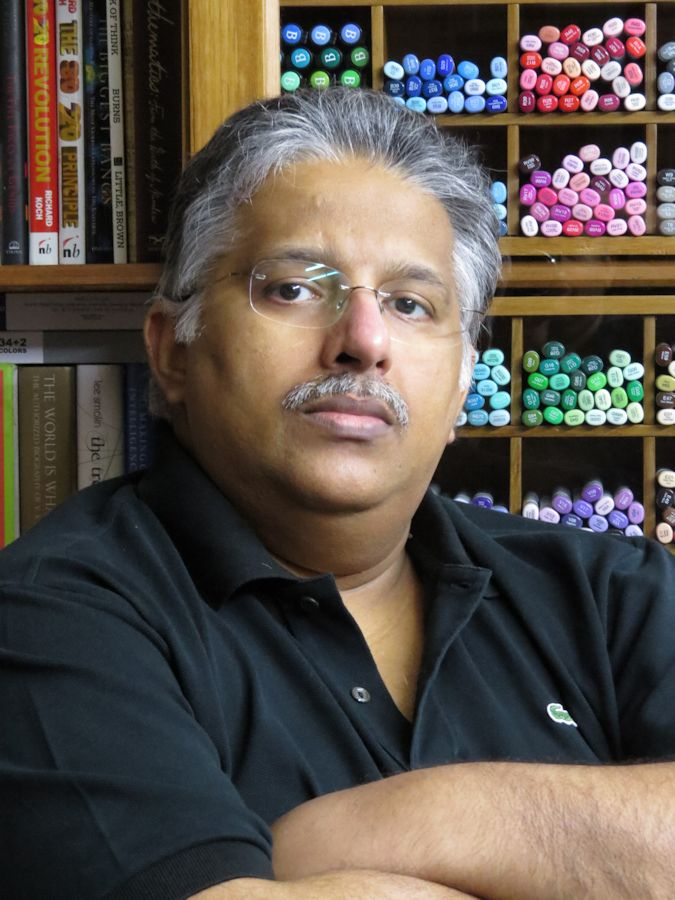
- Alexis Leon
- Born: 19 July 1966 (age 60); Kochi, India
- Occupations: Author, Software consultant
- Notable work: Internet for Everyone, A Guide to Software Configuration Management
- Website: www.alexisleon.com

Alexis Leon (born 19 July 1966) is an Indian software consultant and author of 50 books on IT, Internet, and management. Several of his books are included in the syllabuses of various universities in Africa, Europe, and Asia. His publications are also used as reference books in many organisations. His bestsellers are Internet for Everyone which has sold more than 200,000 copies and A Guide to Software Configuration Management which was the Artech House Bestseller for two years. Two of his books were translated into Mandarin. He is also a mentor at International Mentoring Network Organization.

Leon lives in Kakkanad, Kerala. He passed B. Tech. in industrial engineering from University of Kerala with first rank, and then took M.Tech. He suffered a vehicle accident in 1993 which left him paralysed from chest down and confined to a wheel chair. It was after the accident that he took to writing books.

Leon is a member of the Association for Computing Machinery (ACM), the Institute of Electrical and Electronics Engineers (IEEE), the IEEE Computer Society, the Institute of Industrial Engineers (IIE), the Modern Language Association (MLA), the Computer Assisted Language Instruction Consortium (CALICO), the Indian Institution of Industrial Engineering (IIIE), and the Computer Society of India (CSI).
