= Ranjan Pramod =

Indian screenwriter and director

- Occupations: Screenwriter, Director
- Years active: 2001 - 2006, 2012 - present

T.P Pramod, popularly known as Ranjan Pramod is an Indian screenwriter and director best known for his work in Malayalam cinema. He made his debut as a writer with Randam Bhavam (2001). His popular films include Meesa Madhavan (2002), Manassinakkare (2003), Achuvinte Amma (2005), and Naran (2005), all of them being blockbuster hits. He directed the film Rakshadhikari Baiju Oppu, which received positive reviews and was declared a Super Hit. It also won him the Kerala State Film Award for " Best Film with Popular Appeal and Aesthetic Value" in 2017.

== Career ==
"There is no art in cinema. Art is in the perspective. The fate of the film mainly depends on how well people can relate to the story, how well they can identify themselves with the characters."

— Ranjan Pramod on an interview.

Pramod started his career through the movie Randam Bhavam (2001) directed by Lal Jose. He scripted a variety of commercial successes and well-acclaimed movies including Meesa Madhavan (2002), Manassinakkare (2003), Achuvinte Amma (2005), and Naran (2005). He has directed three movies, Photographer (2006), Rose Guitarinal(2013) and Rakshaadhikari Baiju Oppu (2017) which was a major comeback from Ranjan Pramod in his directorial career. After 10 years, Pramod returned to scriptwriting in Ennum Eppozhum starring Mohanlal and Manju Warrier.

== Notable Work and Style ==
Ranjan Pramod is recognized for his contributions to Malayalam cinema in the 2000s, having written several commercially successful and critically acclaimed films, including Meesa Madhavan (2002), Achuvinte Amma (2005), Manassinakkare (2003), and Naran (2005). These works are considered influential in shaping family-oriented and emotionally driven narratives in the Malayalam film industry. His scripts are characterized by simplicity, rooted storytelling, and relatable characters.

After a period of limited activity, Pramod returned to filmmaking with Rakshadhikari Baiju Oppu (2017), a low-budget film noted for its realistic portrayal of everyday life. The film received both commercial success and state recognition, reinforcing his reputation as a filmmaker prioritizing craft and narrative authenticity.

Pramod’s writing style is grounded, avoiding exaggerated heroism and overtly dramatic sequences. He is noted for developing characters through attention to small, everyday details. His work frequently demonstrates nuanced emotional layering, exemplified in the depiction of familial relationships in Achuvinte Amma and the exploration of rural life in Rakshadhikari Baiju Oppu, often achieving emotional depth without relying on melodrama.

== Filmography ==
Year	Film	Role	Director	Notes
2001	Randam Bhavam	Screenwriter	Lal Jose	
2002	Meesa Madhavan	Screenwriter	Lal Jose	
2003	Manassinakkare	Screenwriter	Sathyan Anthikad	Won, Filmfare Best Film award
2005	Achuvinte Amma	Screenwriter	Sathyan Anthikad	Won, Filmfare Best Film award, National Award for Best Supporting Actress
2005	Naran	Screenwriter	Joshiy	
2006	Photographer	Director and Writer	Himself	Won, Kerala State Film Award for Best Child Artist, Mathrubhumi Award for Best Music Director, Mullasserry Raju Music Award
2013	Rose Guitarinaal	Director and Writer	Himself	
2015	Ennum Eppozhum	Screenwriter	Sathyan Anthikad	Vishu Release 2015
2017	Rakshadhikari Baiju Oppu	Director and Writer	Himself	Won, Kerala State Film Award for Best Film with Popular Appeal and Aesthetic Value, Kerala State Film Award for Best Sync sound, Kerala State Film Award for Best Child Artist
2023	O.Baby	Director and Writer	Himself	
