= Sathyan Anthikad =

Indian film director, screenwriter, lyricist

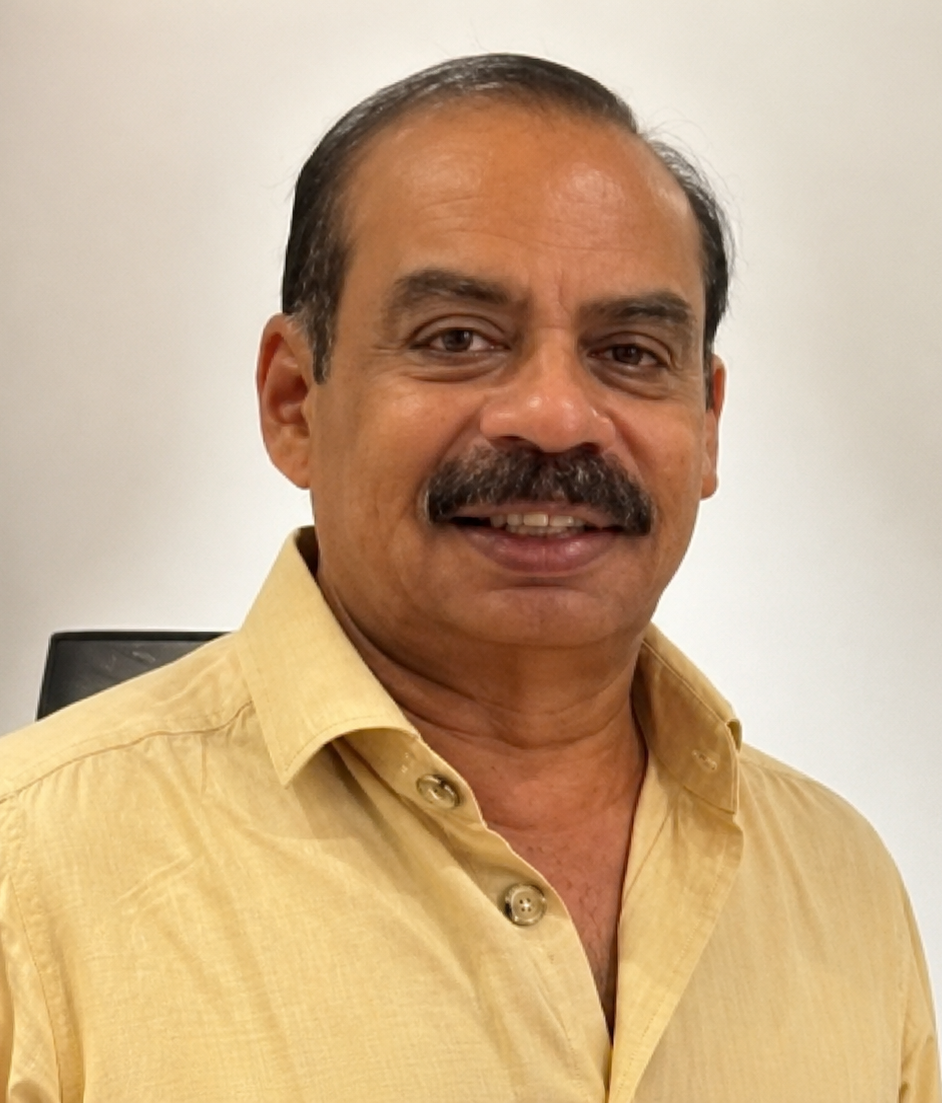
- Sathyan Anthikad in 2025
- Born: Sathyan Anthikad; Anthikad, Thrissur, Kerala
- Occupations: Director; screenwriter; lyricist
- Years active: 1982–present
- Works: Filmography
- Spouse: Nimmy
- Children: Arun Sathyan; Anoop Sathyan; Akhil Sathyan
- Awards: 2008, 2005, 1999 -Kerala State Film Award for Best Popular Film

Sathyan Anthikad is an Indian film director, screenwriter, and lyricist who predominantly works in Malayalam cinema. In a career spanning five decades, he has directed more than 50 films, been the lyricist for 12 films and the scriptwriter for 6 films. He is the recipient of several accolades including a National Film Award, five Kerala State Film Awards and three Filmfare Awards. He received the Kerala Sahitya Akademi Award for Humour in 2019 for his book, Eeswaran Mathram Sakshi.

== Early life ==
Sathyan Anthikad was born to M. V. Krishnan and M. K. Kalyani Amma at Anthikad in the Thrissur district of Kerala. He is married to Nimmy. They have three sons: Arun and twins Anoop and Akhil, both of whom are film directors.

== Career ==
In 1973, Sathyan debuted as an assistant director to P. Balakrishnan in Rekha Cine Arts. He was the associate director of P. Chandrakumar and also assisted director Jeassy in a few films. Sathyan kickstarted his film direction with Kurukkante Kalyanam in 1982. He teamed up with Sreenivasan and made some Malayalam films, with Sreenivasan as the screenwriter. Thalayanamanthram, Nadodikkattu and Sandesam are some of the films born from this team. Sathyan made two novels into films: Appunni starring Mohanlal (a film adaptation of a V. K. N. novel) and C. V. Balakrishnan's Irattakkuttikalude Achan starring Jayaram and Manju Warrier (an adaptation of novel). Films like Pingami, though a commercial failure at the time of release, have over the years gained a cult following.

== Books ==
Sathyan Anthikad has authored Eeswaran Mathram Sakshi, Shesham Vellithirayil and Aathmaavinte Adikkurippukal. Eeswaran Mathram Sakshi received the Kerala Sahitya Akademi Award for Humour in 2019.

== Awards ==
Year	Award	Category	Film	Ref(s)
2024	Mazhavil Entertainment Awards	Master Entertainer (Director) Award		
2001	National Film Awards	Best Feature Film in Malayalam	Kochu Kochu Santhoshangal	
1986	Kerala State Film Awards	Best Story	T. P. Balagopalan M. A.	
1999	Kerala State Film Awards	Best Film with Popular Appeal and Aesthetic Value	Veendum Chila Veettukaryangal	
2005	Kerala State Film Awards	Best Film with Popular Appeal and Aesthetic Value	Achuvinte Amma	
2007	Kerala State Film Awards	Best Screenplay	Vinodayathra	
2008	Kerala State Film Awards	Best Film with Popular Appeal and Aesthetic Value	Innathe Chintha Vishayam	
1996	Filmfare Awards South	Best Director	Thooval Kottaram	
2003	Filmfare Awards South	Best Film	Manassinakkare	
2003	Filmfare Awards South	Best Director	Manassinakkare	
2003	Asianet Film Awards	Best Director	Manassinakkare	
2005	Asianet Film Awards	Best Film	Achuvinte Amma	
1999	Asianet Film Awards	Best Film	Veendum Chila Veettukaryangal	
2006	Mathrubhumi Film Awards	Best Director	Rasathanthram	
2019	South Indian International Movie Awards	Best Director	Njan Prakashan	
