= Bithiri Sathi =

Indian reporter, actor (born 1979)

- Born: Chevella Ravi Kumar (Kavali Ravi Kumar); 5 April 1979 (age 47); Chevella, Andhra Pradesh, India (now in Telangana, India)
- Occupations: News presenter, reporter, actor, singer
- Years active: 2007–present

Chevella Ravi Kumar (born 5 April 1979) known for his TV pseudonym, Bithiri Sathi, is an Indian TV anchor, reporter and actor. Bithiri Sathi, a title character played by him, is part of the daily news, Teenmaar News, on Telugu news channel, V6 News. His news program is a parody on current affairs, politicians and entertainment industry which runs for around 10 minutes. It is a hit for the channel. He became a YouTube sensation with Telugu audience and has millions of hits for his programs.

== Early life ==
Kavali Ravi Kumar (birth name) was born in Pamena village Chevella mandal in Ranga Reddy, Telangana to Yadamma and Kavali Narsimhulu. His father was a drama performer (Bagotham and yakshagana) in the villages. He studied till 5th standard in his village and went to Chevella for high school education. He discontinued education after his intermediate. He was a good mimicry artist and was good at imitating and making fun of people. He became popular among his friends and known circle, and was encouraged to pursue a career in acting in Hyderabad.

== Career ==
Ravi moved to Hyderabad to pursue a career in acting but struggled as was rejected. He worked small jobs to make a living. He finally made his TV debut on Zee Telugu show, Comedy Club, a comedy show with 6–8 participants, and imitation of Tollywood and popular culture personalities. He did well in imitating Tollywood characters.

=== Narsayya Thata ===
He started working with Telugu news channel, 6 TV, and did the program, Odavani Muchata and Mana Ooru. He interviewed celebrities and visited remote villages in an old man's attire. It was well received by the audience. He worked for two years until he moved to V6 news channel.

=== Bithiri Sathi ===
His character, Bithiri Sathi, is part of a daily news parody show on V6 News, Theen Maar News. His role along with the host, Savithri, is funny and asks hilarious questions in a vernacular Telangana dialect.

He developed Bithiri Sathi character, by closely watching two people in Chevella with specially challenged condition. He learnt their true nature, behavior and interaction with the people. Bithiri in Telugu means immature minded person.

== TV shows ==
- Zee Telugu Comedy Club
- 6TV Telangana Narssayya Thata – 2012–2014
- V6 News Teen Maar News – 2015–2019(August)
- V6 News Weekend Teenmaar Special with Bithiri Sathi – 2015–2019(August)
- TV9 Telugu "iSmart News" – 2019(September) – Present.
- Sa Re Ga Ma Pa The Next Singing ICON (2020) as a guest in episode 9

== Filmography ==
- Seema Sastry (2007) – cameo
- Rudramadevi (2015) – cameo
- Goutham Nanda (2017) – himself
- Winner (2017) – as himself
- Nene Raju Nene Mantri (2017) – as reporter
- Raja The Great (2017) - as kabaddi player
- Paper Boy (2018) – as himself
- Diksoochi (2019)
- Sita (2019)
- Brochevarevarura (2019)
- Thupaki Ramudu – As lead actor (2019)
- Gamanam (2020)
- Dochevaarevarura (2023)
- Sathi Gani Rendu Ekaralu (2023)
- Intinti Ramayanam (2023)
- Unstoppable (2023)
- Bhola Shankar (2023)
- Jilebi (2023)
- Tiragabadara Saami (2024)
- Aho Vikramaarka (2024)
- Seetha Payanam (2026)

== Awards and honors ==
- Haasya Prapurna title (2015) – Surya Chandra International's Seva Prapurna Puraskar
- Best Presenter Award (2015) – Padmamohana TV Awards
