= Pearl (cultural festival) =

Annual cultural festival of BITS Pilani, Hyderabad Campus

- The 2018 logo of the fest
- Genre: cultural festival
- Locations: Hyderabad, India
- Founded: 2009
- Filing status: Non-Profit Organization
- Sponsor: BITS Pilani - Hyderabad
- Website: Pearl Website

Pearl is the annual national cultural fest of BITS Pilani, Hyderabad Campus. Initially introduced in 2009 as an intra-college festival, a year after the foundation of BITS Pilani, Hyderabad, the fest grew into a national level college cultural fest with participation from more than 50 colleges across India with footfall around 8000. Pearl hosts a variety of cultural events and competitions which include music, dance, literary, photography and quizzing. The fest also hosts talks and pro-shows with celebrities and bands of national and international renown appearing and/or performing during the fest in the 15 years since its inception.

== History ==
The idea of a college fest for BITS-Pilani Hyderabad was initially conceived by its students in the first academic year of the campus, 2008–09. It was named Pearl in reference to the popularity of Hyderabad for its pearls. Initially envisioned as a cultural-cum-technical fest of the campus, the first edition of Pearl was organized in 2009 as a conglomeration of intra-college competitions. The following year, it turned into an inter-college festival with participants from 50 colleges across India attending it. Since inception, the organization of Pearl has been solely the responsibility of the students of BITS-Pilani Hyderabad. For the first four years, i.e. 2009–2012, Pearl consisted of both technical and cultural events. In 2013, however, the technical events were separated and began being organized as the technical fest of the campus, ATMOS.

Pearl 2018 Logo

Over the 15 years since its first edition, the fest grew into one of the biggest fests in the states of Telangana and Andhra Pradesh and a widely known college fest across India. National and international artists and bands including Farhan Akhtar, Grammy-winning Wolfmother, Vishal–Shekhar, Strings, Xandria, and Dark Tranquility have performed during the pro-shows of the fest. In each edition of Pearl since 2010, the organizing body has based the events and shows of the fest on a theme. The themes of the editions so far are:

Edition	Theme
Pearl 2010	Genesis
Pearl 2011	Dreamscape
Pearl 2012	World 1-2
Pearl 2013	Hakuna Matata
Pearl 2014	Incredible India
Pearl 2015	Odyssey of Legends
Pearl 2016	Live Evil
Pearl 2017	The Carnivalesque Episode
Pearl 2018	Wanderlust
Pearl 2019	Shades Of Hyderabad
Pearl 2020	An Underground Mayhem
Pearl 2021	Fest not held due to COVID-19
Pearl 2022	Fest was rebranded as Orbe Novo 2022
Pearl 2023	Summer of Love
Pearl 2024	Streets of Hyderabad
Pearl 2025	Fiesta del Sol

Pearl 2021, which was scheduled to be conducted from March 20 to 22, was cancelled because of the COVID-19 pandemic.

== Events ==
All the cultural clubs of BITS-Pilani Hyderabad Campus, organize online and offline competitions in the weeks leading up to and during Pearl. The nature of events and the clubs organizing them are following:

- Art (Shades Club)
- Dance (Dance Club)
- Design (Designers Anonymous)
- Dramatics (Dramatics Club)
- Hindi literary (Tarang)
- Journalistic (Journal Club)
- Literary (English Language Activities' Society)
- Music (Music Club)
- Photography (Photog Club)
- Quizzing (Quiz Club)
- Vfx (VFx Club)
- Foreign languages (Sanskrit and Foreign Language Association)
- Cooking (Cooking Club)
- Fashion (fashion society)

Each of the above clubs organizes multiple competitions in their domain. Popular among them include Till Deaf Do We Part (Music), Terpsicore (Dance), Abhivyaktha (Indian Classical Dance), Soul'O (solo dance) Photog Fest (Photography), Sherlocked (English), and Q: Quiz Fest (Quizzing). The Photg Fest also includes an exhibition of as many as 500 photographs taken by the members of the club during the fest. Many of these competitions have regional rounds in metropolitan cities including Kolkota, Sikkim, Mumbai, Bengaluru, Chennai, and Delhi. The winners of these regional rounds compete during Pearl for the final prize. The fest organizing body also organizes Culinary Factory (food festival), Glitterati (fashion show), Catharsis (film festival), Crimson Curtain (dramatics competitions) and Miss Diva (beauty pageant contest). Apart from the above, informal events like Bollywood quiz, Treasure Hunt, and Crossword are also conducted. The total prize money of the events during Pearl is usually about Rs.15 laksh.

=== Aspire Talks ===
Apart from the events, the Centre for Entrepruniaural Leadership (CEL) and the BITS Embryo of the BITS-Pilani Hyderabad organize the Aspire Talks, wherein people of various walks of life who have distinguished themselves in their professions interact with students and share their life stories.

== Pro-Shows and Celebrities ==
Pankaj Bhadouria during Pearl 2016.

Pearl has hosted many celebrities of vernacular, national and international renown over years since its inception. Each of the three days of the festival ends with a performance by a celebrity performer or band. The people/bands that performed during Pearl are Farhan Akhtar, Vishal–Shekhar, Grammy-winning Wolfmother, Dark Tranquility (the Swedish metal band), Xandria (the German metal band), Thaikkudam Bridge (Indian rock band), Strings, Bharat Jain, Javed Ali, Benny Dayal, Thurisaz (the Belgian metal band), Parikrama, Ganesh and Kumaresh, Karthik, DJ Nucleya, Amplifier (band) (British psychedelic prog rock band), Kryptos (band), the Ghatam Brothers, and the Indian JAM Project.

Apart from pro-shows, Pearl also hosted celebrities promoting films. Pearl 2015 hosted Varun Dhawan and Yami Gautam for the promotion of film Badlapur. The winner of MasterChef India, Pankaj Bhadouria attended the food festival during Pearl 2016. Telugu actors Nani and Vijay Deverakonda visited the campus during Pearl 2015 for the promotion of their film Yevade Subramanyam. Comedian Abish Matthew performed during the comedy night of Peal 2016.

== See also ==
- BITS Pilani Hyderabad Campus
- ATMOS -Technical Fest of BITS-Pilani Hyderabad
- Verba Maximus - Literary Fest of BITS-Pilani Hyderabad
