= Dilip Kumar Salvadi =

Indian actor and director, born 1985

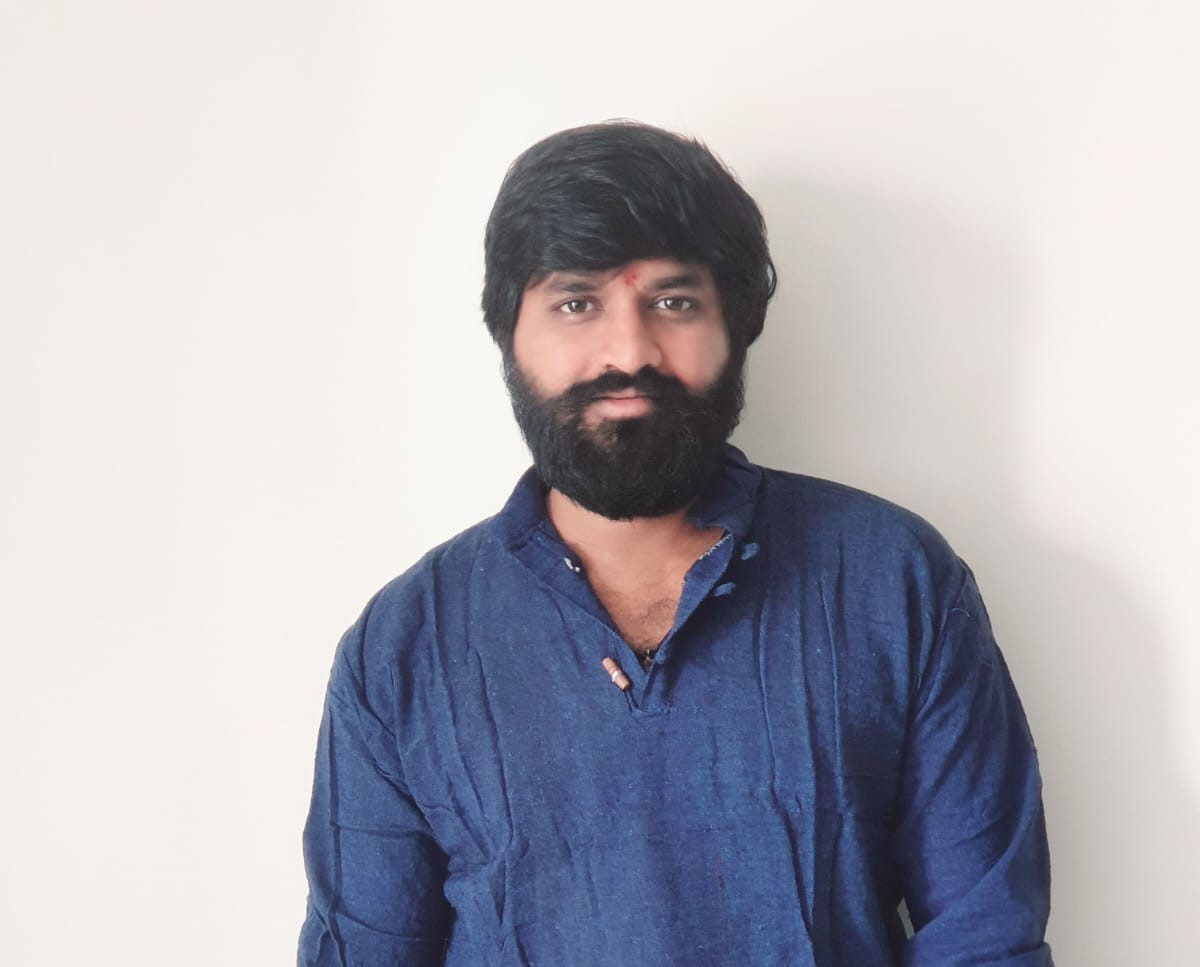
- Other names: Dileep Kumar
- Occupations: Actor; director; editor
- Years active: 1994-2006; 2012-present

Dilip Kumar Salvadi (born 30 April 1985) is an Indian actor, director, and editor who works predominantly in Telugu and Tamil films.

== Career ==
He started his career as a child artist between the early 1990s and 2000s starting with Number One (1994). As a child artist, he has performed in more than 20 films, and is most noted for playing the younger version of Gopichand in Jayam (2002) and its Tamil remake. He began his career as a lead protagonist in the movie Seenu c/o Anu (2005). He continued for a decade for several films in Telugu, Malayalam and Tamil. He collaborated with director Arjunaraja for three films: Maiyam Konden, Kovalanin Kadhali and Thiru-pugaz. He starred in Sasi Shanker's Pagadai Pagadai (2014) in dual roles.

In 2019, he worked as a director for the period film Diksoochi (2019). Regarding his performance in the film, a critic wrote that "Dileep Kumar played multiple roles for the film, as an actor, as a director, and as an editor. He played his part very well in the movie. As a story-teller, he is brilliant and at the same time, as an actor, he is good. He scored good marks in the debut".

== Filmography ==
Child Artist

- Note: all films are in Telugu, unless otherwise noted.

Filmography
Year	Film	Role	Notes
1994	Number One	Young Vijay's brother	
1994	Thodi Kodallu	Boy at funeral	
1994	Bhale Mammayya	Chinni	
1994	Punya Bhoomi Naa Desam	Young Bangaraiah's son	
1995	Pokiri Raja	CM's son	
1995	Mounam	Kiran's son	
1996	Dharma Chakram	Newspaper boy	
1996	College Student	Hero's Neighbour	
1998	Bavagaru Bagunnara	Boy in celebration	Uncredited role
1998	Manasichi Choodu	Boy on cycle	
1999	Sneham Kosam	Young Simhadri	
1999	Manikyam	Meenakshi's brother	
1999	Anaganaga Oka Ammai	Tea shop boy	
2000	Annayya	Young Rajaram	
2000	Manasichanu	Heroine's friend	
2000	Maa Annayya	Young Madhu	
2001	Daddy	Car accident boy	
2002	Jayam	Young Raghu	
2003	Jayam	Young Raghu	Tamil film
2005	Bhagmati	Youngster	Hindi film

Lead Actor

Filmography
Year	Film	Role	Language	Notes
2005	Seenu c/o Anu	Seenu	Telugu	
2006	Venkat Tho Alivelu	Venkat	Telugu	
2012	Steps		Malayalam	
2013	Maiyam Konden		Tamil	
2013	Oke Oka Chance		Telugu	
2013	Thiru-pugaz	Pugal	Tamil	
2013	Na Sami Ranga	Seenu	Telugu	
2014	Kovalanin Kadhali	Pandian	Tamil	
2014	Pagadai Pagadai	Saravanan, Karthik Kameshwaran	Tamil	dual roles
2019	Diksoochi	Dileep	Telugu	Also director, writer and editor
2026	Shambhala	TBA	Telugu	Also director and writer

=== Television ===
List of television roles
Year	Film	Role	Language	Notes
1994	Vandemataram		Telugu	Child artist
1996-97	Punarapi Jananam		Telugu	Child artist
1996-97	Drusthi		Telugu	Child artist
1996-97	Dongala Bandi		Telugu	Child artist
1996-97	Srimath Virat Potuluri Veerabrahmendra Swami Charitha	Veera Brahma Swami	Telugu	Child artist
1997–2001	Ruthuragalu	Vardhan	Telugu	Child artist
	Malle Pandhiri		Telugu	Child artist
2022	She	Chinnanna	Hindi	Netflix series; season 2 episode "The Test"
