= ATMOS (festival) =

Techno-management festival of BITS Pilani, Hyderabad Campus

ATMOS, BITS Pilani Hyderabad Campus
- Genre: Techno-management festival
- Begins: 7 November 2025
- Ends: 9 November 2025
- Venue: BITS Pilani, Hyderabad Campus
- Locations: Hyderabad, India
- Coordinates: 17°32′43.9″N 78°34′13.8″E
- Founded: 2012
- Organiser: Student Union of BITS Pilani, Hyderabad Campus
- Filing status: Non-Profit Student Organization
- Sponsor: BITS Pilani, Hyderabad Campus
- Prize money: ₹ 10 Lakhs
- Slogan: A Neon Dystopia
- Website: BITS Atmos

ATMOS is the annual techno-management festival of BITS Pilani, Hyderabad Campus, located in Hyderabad, India. It is known for a wide range of events, such as workshops, quizzes, lectures, technical exhibitions and competitions. Among the notable events conducted annually during it are the national level quiz Enigma and BITS MUN Hyderabad. Started in 2012, ATMOS aims at improving the technical culture among Indian colleges as well as providing a platform to showcase their abilities. In its fourteenth year now, ATMOS is growing rapidly with participation from students, academics, entrepreneurs and speakers from all over India.

In 2015, BITS MUN Hyderabad was organized alongside ATMOS as a collaboration and has witnessed wide engagement from students across the country. The annual Tech Expo was launched in the 5th edition of ATMOS, as a platform for innovators to showcase their projects to prospective sponsors and incubators. The current edition will be held from 18 to 20 October 2019.

== History ==
=== 2012 ===
The turnout for the festival in 2012 was about 200 colleges from all over India. The festival ran for three days from 25 to 27 October. Notable companies like Wikipedia and DreamWorks Animation conducted workshops, while other events included robotics and circuit Design competitions.

=== 2013 ===
ATMOS 2013 was organized from 10 to 13 October. Various events, workshops, and talks were hosted including a Raspberry Pi workshop and a Windows 8 Appfest. Enigma 2013 was organized too, with the finals at Hyderabad. BITS MUN Hyderabad 2013 was organized alongside ATMOS this year. ATMOS 2013 received a footfall of over 4000 in a period of 3 days.

=== 2014 ===
The festival ran from 9 to 12 October this year with growing focus on the management aspect of the festival, including several events based on finance and managing firms. The fest was graced by the presence of the Telangana IT minister, K. T. Rama Rao. This year's Enigma established it on the national scene with over 250 teams participating in the regional rounds and the finals conducted in Hyderabad. ATMOS 2014 registered a footfall of over 5000 over three days.

=== 2015 ===
The 2015 event was sponsored by a number of organizations, including Coca-Cola, Uninor, Hero MotoCorp and Redbull. Several workshops, competitions and talks were organized over three days, including a two-day hackathon organized by Microsoft, and an Hackathon by Firefox. Dr, G. Satheesh Reddy, the technological adviser to the Defence Minister and Director, Research Center Imarat (DRDO) and Justice Markandey Katju, retired Chief Justice of India and former Chairman of the Press Council of India were the guests of honor. The finals of Enigma were conducted by quizmaster Vikram Joshi, with the winners of eight regional rounds participating. BITS MUN Hyderabad 2015 was also organized with a pre-conference headliner event. With a footfall of over 8000, ATMOS 2015 was the biggest to date.

=== 2016 ===
The fifth edition had as its title sponsor Cyient with Co-title sponsors being Prodigy Finance and WATConsult, a part of the Dentsu Aegis Network among others like State Bank of India, Oracle Corporation etc. Mrs. Tessy Thomas, Project Director of Agni-V was present as the Chief Guest for the inauguration. A new event was introduced this year namely, Project JumpStart, where 4 prominent start-up founders had an interactive session with the audience. Various renowned speakers addressed at the ATMOS Conclave this year including Padma Bhushan winner and founder of Narayana Health, Devi Prasad Shetty. Another new event set up by the Electrical engineering department was Quark Expo, which aims to provide an excellent platform for electrical enthusiasts to showcase their projects and talents and win prizes. The Finance and Investment club- Bulls and Bears conducted a first ever Case study event where participants had to showcase their skills and display a shrewd understanding of Finance and the Market, to be judged by a panel. Microsoft also hosted a Cloud Computing Workshop on Azure Machine Learning, providing an opportunity to learn more about the field of data analytics. Another highlight of the fest was the Python PyBITS conference organized in association with Python Software Foundation. There was a workshop on Animated Film making conducted by DreamWorks as well.

The headliner event being the Tech Expo aimed at providing a platform for thinkers and techies to showcase their projects to prospective sponsors, incubators and mentors. It witnessed wide participation from teams across the country, both independent and from various colleges like IIT Bombay, IIT Kanpur etc. WATCounsult has established an innovation lab called INNOWAT at their Mumbai office, and the first of its projects received funding at this event.

=== 2017 ===
The sixth edition begun on 27 October and lasted 3 days with this year's theme "A Neon Dystopia". The fest had several new events and an even more bigger and extravagant show.

=== 2020 & 2021 ===
These were held virtually, owing to COVID-19 pandemic.

=== 2022 ===
Atmos was merged with Pearl, the campus's cultural fest, to create Orbe Novo, the largest and event in BPHC history. Held over five days, Orbe Novo became a grand celebration of technology and culture, featuring an array of technical competitions, cultural performances, workshops, and exhibitions. With thousands of participants from across the country, the fest set new standards for campus festivals, combining the best of innovation, creativity, and entertainment in a single platform.

== Organisation ==
ATMOS is organized almost entirely by the students of BITS-Pilani Hyderabad campus. The administrative work is divided among various departments, with the heads of the departments comprising the Fest Organising Body, which is led by the President of the Students' Union. The workshops and events are organized by the Tech Senate, which comprises the associations and the technical societies and clubs. The Tech Senate is led by the Technical Convener. The departments, clubs, societies and associations work together under the supervision of the Technical Convener to ensure smooth functioning and streamlined management and administration.

== Events ==
=== Quizzes ===
==== Enigma ====
Enigma is BITS Pilani, Hyderabad campus' annual national level general quiz. It consists of two rounds, a regional round and a national round. The regional rounds are conducted in various Indian cities, with the winners moving on to the finals in Hyderabad. It is a college level event, though high school students are allowed to participate too. Prominent quiz masters are invited to host the final rounds of the competition each year.

Other quizzes include the Midnight AV quiz and the SciTech quiz which is focused on testing your technical knowledge.

=== BITS MUN Hyderabad ===
BITS MUN Hyderabad is the Model United Nations Conference hosted by BITS Pilani, Hyderabad campus. Started in 2012, BITS MUN has collaborated with ATMOS since its inception. It has grown to become one of the largest and most competitive MUNs in the South Indian circuit. In 2015, BITS MUN hosted a panel discussion led by Justice R.S. Rathore on "Freedom of speech in the Digital Age" as a pre-conference headliner event.

=== Workshops ===
A broad range of workshops ranging from a few hours to multiple days, in diverse disciplines like Computer Science, Mechanical Engineering, Industrial Engineering, Electronics, Cinema, Design, Aerodynamics, Economics, Biology etc. is one of the highlights of the festival. They include, an IOT Workshop, Augmented reality workshop, Cloud Computing workshop, Industrial Automation workshop, Petroleum Refining workshop, Workshops in Aerodynamics, Filmmaking, Electronics among others. Each new edition sees many newer and different workshops.

=== Competitions ===
==== Robowars ====
In this event, fighting robots constructed by teams participate in one-on-one fights, clearing various stages leading up to a final. Staged in a closed arena, Robowars is one of the most popular events in the fest, attracting a large audience.

==== Quadcopter Challenge ====
Quadcopter Challenge is an event for quadcopters constructed by teams of students. In this event, the competitors build multi-coloured drones and fly them through obstacles of increasing difficulty, completing challenges with points being awarded for each round.

==== Mini GP ====
Mini GP is another team event, where teams have to construct and race remote-based internal combustion engine cars through tracks of increasing complexity, including Qualifiers and head-to-head races. Another crowd-puller, the rules for competition are based on real world racing events and attracts great participation as well.

==== Anatomy of Murder ====
This event is based on forensic skills and crime scene analysis. The first round is a written quiz testing knowledge of basic forensic skills. In the second round, three member teams gather evidence including blood samples and fingerprints and trace a killer.

=== Code Jam ===
Code Jam is ATMOS' headliner coding contest. Conducted in association with HackerEarth, it aims to find the best coder present. Teams of two can participate and code in any language from the given options. Contestants are judged on mathematical ability and how well they implement algorithms. The competition consists of a set of challenging algorithmic problems which must be solved in a fixed amount of time. There are 2 rounds and the top 25 teams enter the finals, where the winners are given prize money.

Other coding competitions include the Reverse Coding challenge, and Algomaniac, which tests your analytical prowess along with pattern recognition skills.

=== Exhibitions ===
==== Tech Expo ====
The Tech Expo newly launched in the 5th edition-ATMOS 16' aims at providing a platform for thinkers and techies to showcase their projects to prospective sponsors, incubators and mentors. In its first edition itself, it witnessed wide participation from teams across the country, both independent and from various colleges like IIT Bombay, IIT Kanpur etc.

=== Hackathon ===
ATMOS hosts at least one Hackathon, with the contest typically a day or more. It is a team event, with three or four programmers coming up with an idea and writing the rudimentary code for it. Hackathons test a programmer's ability to be creative and sustain concentration under pressure. Companies like Microsoft and Firefox have organized Hackathons here previously.

== Partners ==
ATMOS has consistently partnered with major firms over the years. ATMOS has also received patronage from the Government initiative Make in India. The fest has gained extensive coverage over the years from Media partners such as Times of India, Radio Mirchi, ETV, Sakshi, 6TV etc. ATMOS has associated with prominent organizations like Coca-Cola, Red Bull, Oracle Corporation, LG, Comedy Central, VH1 India State Bank of India, State Bank of Hyderabad, ACT Fibernet, and FedEx. Automobile partners have included the likes of Hero MotoCorp, KTM, and Honda, among others.

== See also ==
- Pearl (cultural festival of BITS Pilani Hyderabad Campus)
- BITS Pilani, Hyderabad Campus
