= Pagadai Pagadai =

2014 Indian film by Sasi Shanker

- Theatrical release poster
- Directed by: Sasi Shanker
- Written by: V. Prabhakaran (dialogues)
- Screenplay by: V. Prabhakaran
- Story by: Sasi Shanker
- Starring: Dilip Kumar Salvadi; Divya Singh
- Cinematography: Y. N. Murali
- Edited by: Suresh Urs
- Music by: John Peter; Ramji
- Production companies: Wisdom Films; VRDD Arts Films
- Release date: 5 December 2014
- Country: India
- Language: Tamil

Pagadai Pagadai is a 2014 Indian Tamil-language romantic action thriller film directed by Sasi Shanker and starring Dilip Kumar Salvadi in dual roles and Divya Singh. The film was released to mixed-to-negative reviews.

== Cast ==
- Dilip Kumar Salvadi as Saravanan and Karthik Kameshwaran
- Divya Singh as Priya
- Ilavarasu as S. Kotteswaran
- Richu (special appearance in the song "Pappali")
- Kovai Sarala as Anbukkarasi
- Mayilsamy as Kalyan
- Singamuthu as Saravanan's father
- Santhana Bharathi as Priya's father
- Muthukaalai as S. Pitchandi
- Chelladurai as Bus Passenger
- Ambani Shankar as Anjaneyulu
- Ravi Venkataraman as Hotel staff member

== Soundtrack ==
The music was composed by Ramji and John Peter.

Track listing
No.	Title	Lyrics	Singer(s)	Length
1.	"Pakatai"	Tamizhamuthan	Mukesh
2.	"Pakkadia"	Paul Mugil	Rita
3.	"Man Vaasam"	Va. Karuppan	Saindhavi, Jagadees
4.	"Thookkividu Collor"	Tamizhamuthan	Mukesh
5.	"Maarudhea"	Tamizhamuthan	Pooja
6.	"Pakatai"	Tamizhamuthan	Mukesh, Kritika, J. Kumar
Total length:				25:31

== Reception ==
A critic from The New Indian Express wrote that "There is nothing much to entice a viewer in the movie". A critic from iFlicks wrote that "Director Sasi Shankar has tried to make the movie lively but the lack of continuity is a big drawback. Likewise many comedians are present in the cast but the director fails to make the movie hilarious". On the contrary, a critic from Kungumam wrote that "Director Sasi Shankar has told the story humorously with comedy actors".
