= Thommanum Makkalum =

2005 Indian Malayalam-language film

- VCD cover
- Directed by: Shafi
- Written by: Benny P Nayarambalam
- Produced by: Lal
- Starring: Mammooty; Rajan P. Dev; Lal
- Cinematography: Sanjeev Sankar
- Edited by: Hariharaputhran K.P
- Music by: Alex Paul
- Production company: Lal Creations
- Distributed by: Lal Release
- Release date: 18 March 2005
- Running time: 130 minutes
- Country: India
- Language: Malayalam

Thommanum Makkalum (English: Thomman and Sons) is a 2005 Indian Malayalam-language action comedy film directed by Shafi, written by Benny P. Nayarambalam, and produced by Lal under his production house Lal Creations. The film stars Mammootty, Rajan P. Dev and Lal in main roles.

Shafi remade the film in Tamil as Majaa (2005) and in Kannada as Kaamannana Makkalu (2008).

== Plot ==
The movie revolves around Shivan, his friend Sathyan, and their adopted father Thomman, a notorious thief of that land. The story begins when they decide to mend their ways and lead a hardworking life. They own a lorry now and want to find work. Their lorry breaks down near Udumalpet. There the twists start. Sathyan steals some food from Panicker's house. The food is mixed with poison by Panicker due to oppression from the village head Thevar because Panicker's son cheats him and his daughter. Thomman eats the food and is hospitalised. After returning from the hospital, Thomman and his sons approach Panicker to know the truth. Thomman and his sons decides to help Panicker and they defeat Thevar's gang and take Thevar's henchman Rajakkannu as their slave. Later Thevar's daughter Poonkavanam falls in love with Shivan. Thevar arranges Shivan's marriage with his daughter. Kaliyappan who is Poonkavanam's maternal uncle successfully stops the wedding. At the wedding night Sathyan becomes a thief who robs the groom's ornaments, which makes the brothers to part ways. However, Kaliyappan was the real culprit. He tries to kill Sathyan and tell everyone that he escaped with the money. Panicker's son is killed by Kaliyappan. Shivan comes and helps Sathyan. They go to Thevar's house and reveal to him the truth about Panicker's son and all the misdeeds of Kaliyappan. After all goes well, it was revealed by Rajakkannu that Thomman, due to his son's separation, attempts to commit suicide from a cliff. His sons rushes to the cliffside and Thomman tell that they would fight and defeat him in order to reconsider his decision. at the climax, Shivan and Sathyan beats Thomman and the trio reunite.

== Cast ==
- Mammootty as Shivan
- Rajan P. Dev as Thomman, the adopted father of Shivan and Sathyan
- Lal as Sathyan, Shivan's friend
- Laya as Poonkavanam
- Sindhu Menon as Sheela
- Salim Kumar as Rajakannu
- Janardhanan as Panicker
- Kalasala Babu as Thevar
- Besant Ravi as Thangavelu
- Abu Salim as Manikyan, Kaliyappan's henchman
- Anand as Kaliyappan
- Mohan Jose as Pillai
- Yadu Krishnan as Gunashekaran, Sheela's former husband
- Boban Alummoodan as Gopi Krishnan (Cameo appearance)
- Kochu Preman as Doctor Satheeshan
- Machan Varghese as Raghu
- Baiju Ezhupunna as SI Thankaraj

== Soundtrack ==
The film's soundtrack contains 7 songs, all composed by Alex Paul and Lyrics by Kaithapram.

#	Title	Singer(s)
1	"Aadya Raathri"	K. J. Yesudas
2	"Karppaka Malare"	Afsal, Madhu Balakrishnan, Pradeep Palluruthy, Savitha Krishnamoorthy, Vipin
3	"Nerinazhaku"	P. Jayachandran, Mano
4	"Nerinazhaku [D]"	Biju Narayanan, Manjari
5	"Punyavan"	Pradeep Palluruthy
6	"Vattolakkuda"	K. J. Yesudas, K. S. Chitra
7	"Vattolakkuda (F)"	K. S. Chitra

== Release ==
The film was released on 18 March 2005.

=== Critical reception ===
Sify gave it a rating of 3 out of 5.

=== Box office ===
The film was commercially successful. and completed 100 days in theatres.

== Remakes ==
Following its success in Malayalam, the film was later remade in Tamil as Majaa, with Vikram. It is also remade in Kannada as Kaamannana Makkalu with Sudeep.
