= Punya Bhoomi Naa Desam =

- Directed by: A. Kodandarami Reddy
- Written by: K. K. Singh
- Based on: Krantiveer (Hindi)
- Produced by: Mohan Babu
- Starring: Mohan Babu; Meena; Dasari Narayana Rao; Annapoorna; Brahmanandam
- Cinematography: K. V. Anand
- Music by: Bappi Lahiri
- Production company: Sri Lakshmi Prasanna Pictures
- Release date: 11 November 1994
- Country: India
- Language: Telugu

Punya Bhoomi Naa Desam is a 1994 Indian Telugu film directed by A. Kodandarami Reddy and produced by Mohan Babu under the banner of his production company Sri Lakshmi Prasanna Pictures. It stars Mohan Babu and Meena in lead roles, while Dasari Narayana Rao, Gollapudi Maruti Rao, Annapoorna, Brahmanandam and Babu Mohan played other pivotal roles. The film is a remake of the Hindi film Krantiveer. The film's title is based on a song from Major Chandrakanth (1993), which also starred Mohan Babu.

== Cast ==
- Mohan Babu as Bharath
- Manchu Manoj as child Bharath
- Meena as Swathi
- Dasari Narayana Rao as Bangaraiah
- Raj Kumar as Bangaraiah's son
- Dilip Kumar Salvadi as young Bangaraiah's son
- Subhashri
- Annapoorna
- Brahmanandam
- Babu Mohan
- Gollapudi Maruthi Rao
- Narra Venkateswara Rao
- AVS
- M. S. Narayana

== Soundtrack ==
All music was composed by Bappi Lahiri.

1. "Pahadarella Redu" (Singers: S.P. Balasubrahmanyam, K. S. Chitra)
2. "Toorupulona Suryudu" (Singers: S.P. Balasubrahmanyam, K. S. Chitra)
3. "Jai Durga" (Singers: S.P. Balasubrahmanyam, K. S. Chitra)
4. "Abbaya Chesuko Pelli" (Singers: S. P. Balasubrahmanyam)
5. "Bharataa Desamaa" (Singers: S. P. Balasubrahmanyam)
6. "Teenage Sweety Beauty" (Singers: S. P. Balasubrahmanyam, K. S. Chitra)
