= Verba Maximus =

Annual literary festival in Hyderabad, India

- Verba Maximus 2018 Logo
- Genre: Literary festival
- Locations: Hyderabad, India
- Founded: 2011
- Sponsor: BITS Pilani, Hyderabad Campus
- Website: Official webpage

Verba Maximus (abbreviated VM) is the annual literary festival of BITS Pilani, Hyderabad Campus. It is one of the 4 fests conducted in the college, the other 3 being Atmos, Pearl and Arena. It is a national event, held usually in the last weeks of January or the first week of February. Regional rounds, preceding the main fest in Hyderabad, are generally conducted in major metropolitan cities like Bengaluru, Chennai, Delhi, Hyderabad, Jaipur, Kolkata, Mumbai, Vijayawada and Visakhapatnam and feature events like Just a Minute (JAM), spell bee, and debate.

== History ==
Eight editions of the fest have been conducted over the years, the latest of which was held over 19–21 January 2018. The multi-lingual fest is organised by the English Language Activities Society (ELAS), Journal Club and Hindi Tarang, which are student organisations at BITS Pilani, Hyderabad Campus. The first edition of the fest took place in 2011, less than three years after the campus became fully operational.

=== Verba Maximus 2016 ===
Verba Maximus 2016 (VM16) was held on 30 and 31 January 2016. VM16 had events like Yin Yang (writing two sides of the same story), Words of a Feather (weaving a story around words that are announced one at a time), Picture Perspective (writing stories around a picture shown), apart from the regular events lit-quiz, group discussion and debate. Harimohan Paruvu, cricketeer and author, hosted a session at the fest. Stand-up comedian Biswa Kalyan Rath performed at VM16, which features a stand-up show every year.

=== Verba Maximus 2017 ===
Verba Maximus 2017 (VM17) was held from 4–6 February 2017 and featured authors Ashwin Sanghi and Indu Balachandran, popular Quoran Balaji Vishwanathan as well as a show by stand-up comedian Kenny Sebastian.

== Events ==
The fest has literary events like picture perspective (writing about a picture or image that is presented), a Hindi mock parliament called the "Youth Sabha", lit-quiz, debate, group discussion and Sherlocked, an investigative journalism event in which participants have to investigate a crime based on hints given to them. Some editions of the fest also had events like 'Pada Vinayasam', a Telugu crossword and writing event. Recent editions of the fest, including Verba Maximus 2018, have newer events like Man from Amorium (write a story around a given skeletal plot), Symphonies of the Soul (write about a clip of music that is played) and Devil's Advocate (defend an unpopular opinion or ideology).
