= Kunjikoonan =

- VCD cover
- Directed by: Sasi Shanker
- Written by: Benny P. Nayarambalam
- Based on: Vikalanga Varsham by Benny P. Nayarambalam
- Produced by: Milan Jaleel
- Starring: Dileep; Navya Nair; Manya; Sai Kumar
- Cinematography: P. Sukumar; Saloo George
- Edited by: Ranjan Abraham
- Music by: Mohan Sitara
- Production company: Galaxy films
- Release date: 11 October 2002
- Running time: 155 minutes
- Country: India
- Language: Malayalam
- Budget: ₹1.9 crore

Kunjikoonan (transl. The little hunchback) is a 2002 Indian Malayalam-language comedy drama film directed by Sasi Shanker and produced by Milan Jaleel under his banner Galaxy Films. The film's script was written by Benny P. Nayarambalam, based on his own stage play Vikalanga Varsham. It stars Dileep, Navya Nair and Manya. Dileep plays dual roles in this movie and won Asianet Film Awards for Best Actor. The film was later remade into different Indian languages, such as Perazhagan (2004) in Tamil and Manmatha (2006) in Kannada. The film was a commercial success, and Dileep's handicapped character was praised by the critics.

== Plot ==
The story revolves around Vimal Kumar alias Kunjan, a village telephone booth owner who is sympathized for his hunchback looks and is lauded for selfless service to others. He covers up his handicap with humor. Unmindful of his looks, Vimal goes around seeking a suitable bride with the help of his friend, Thoma. Brushing aside many an insult hurled at him, he carries on. He carried the hardships of his life on his back and the pain of others too. He was of peak human morals, a man of great virtue.

In contrast to him is Prasad, a violent college student and a well-talented basketball player, who loves his classmate, Lakshmi. She comes across Vimal, who assures her that he will get her married to the man of her heart. However, she is killed in a fracas by a dreaded gangster named Vasu. Prasad gets accused of the murder and is jailed. Vimal saves Prasad by telling Lakshmi's father, CI Madhavan, that Vasu actually killed her, and he was helping them elope and get married. Vasu gets arrested, and Prasad gets released. Meanwhile, Vimal comes across an orphaned blind girl, Chembagam. He wins her heart by helping her out.

Thanks to his efforts, Chembagam regains her vision through Lakshmi's eyes. This results in a tussle between Vimal and Prasad as to who Chembagam belongs to now. However, fearing his looks, Vimal decides to make way for the other after he sees Prasad and Chembagam together and misunderstands them. Thoma later finds him and tells him that Chembagam is waiting for him. They decide to get married, but on the night before their wedding, Vasu comes to Vimal's house to kill him. After he learns that Vimal is going to get married, Vasu tries to rape Chembagam. Vimal saves her, but Vasu tries to kill Vimal. When she runs away, Prasad catches her. When he sees Vasu going to kill Vimal, he saves him by fighting off Vasu and killing him, thereby avenging Lakshmi's death. Prasad approves Kunjan and Chembagam before being sent to jail.

== Cast ==
- Dileep in dual role as:
  - Vimal Kumar (Kunjan), a hunchbacked telephone booth owner
  - Prasad, a short-tempered college student and sports player
- Navya Nair as Chembakam, Kunjan's love interest
- Manya as Lakshmi, Prasad's love interest
- Sai Kumar as 'Garudan' Vasu (Vasuannan), the main antagonist
- Cochin Haneefa as Thoma, Kunjan's friend
- Salim Kumar as Chandran, Thoma's associate
- Machan Varghese as Divakaran
- Bindu Panicker as Aishumma, Kunjan's foster mother
- Guinness Pakru as Suhasini (voice dubbed by Anandavalli)
- Nedumudi Venu as Constable Padmanabhan, Prasad's father
- Manka Mahesh as Prasad's mother
- Spadikam George as CI Madhavan, Lakshmi's father
- Reena as Lakshmi's mother
- Geetha Salam as Chembakam's father
- Narayanankutty as Chayakada owner
- Johny Antony as a caller at the Telephone booth (special appearance)
- Nithya Das in a cameo role as Kunjan's dream wife in the song "Kunjante Penninu"

== Production ==
=== Filming ===
The film was mainly shot at various locations in Thodupuzha. It was filmed in 83 days.

== Soundtrack ==
Kunjikoonan

Soundtrack album by Mohan Sithara
- Released: 2002
- Length: 39:12
- Language: Malayalam
- Label: Satyam Audios

Mohan Sithara chronology
Oomappenninu Uriyadappayyan (2002)	Kunjikoonan (2002)	Pranayamanithooval (2002)

The songs of this movie were composed by Mohan Sithara and penned by Yusufali Kechery. In 2002, Radhika Thilak received best female playback singer award from Kerala film critics association for the song "Omanamalare Ninmaran".

All lyrics are written by Yusufali Kechery; all music is composed by Mohan Sithara.

No.	Title	Artist(s)	Length
1.	"Azhake Varu Nee"	Mahadevan	4:23
2.	"Katte Poonkatte"	P. Jayachandran	5:00
3.	"Kadanja Chandanamo"	K. J. Yesudas	4:25
4.	"Kanne Unaru Nee (Male Version)"	K. J. Yesudas	5:18
5.	"Kanne Unaru Nee (Female Version)"	Sujatha Mohan	5:16
6.	"Kunjante Penninu (Male Version)"	Vidhu Prathap	4:46
7.	"Kunjante Penninu (Female Version)"	Jyotsna Radhakrishnan, Hridya Suresh
8.	"Omana Malare"	Radhika Thilak	5:01
Total length:			39:12

== Reception ==
A critic from Nowrunning wrote that "Dileep scores again with his new release kunjikoonan. This time he comes in double role, one that of a handicap and has excelled in the role and the other as handsome college boy which is not worth mentioning. Those who expect an entertainer like 'Meesha Madhavan' are likely to be disappointed, at least to some extent". A critic from Sify wrote that "The highlight of the film is Dileep in the title role and he is extraordinary. Here is one of his most lovable performances as the handicap, though as the handsome Prasad he just passes muster.

== Accolades ==
Kerala Film Critics Association Awards

- Best Actor – Dileep
- Best Actress – Navya Nair
- Best Female Playback Singer – Radhika Thilak
- Special Jury Award – Saikumar
