= Mister Butler =

- Theatrical release poster
- Directed by: Sasi Shanker
- Screenplay by: Sasi Shanker
- Story by: Pandiarajan
- Based on: Gopala Gopala (1996) by Pandiarajan
- Produced by: K. Pradeep Kumar
- Starring: Dileep; Ruchita Prasad; Innocent; Nedumudi Venu; Jagathy Sreekumar
- Cinematography: Chandramouli
- Edited by: A. Sukumaran
- Music by: Vidyasagar
- Production company: Master Creations
- Distributed by: Master Release; Blue Moon Release
- Release date: 15 April 2000
- Running time: 130 minutes
- Country: India
- Language: Malayalam

Mister Butler is a 2000 Indian Malayalam-language comedy-drama film scripted and directed by Sasi Shanker. It is a remake of the 1996 Tamil film Gopala Gopala. The film stars Dileep and Ruchita Prasad. The music was composed by Vidyasagar. Though failed to find audience initially later became sleeper hit due to positive word of mouth.

== Plot ==
Gopalakrishnan, a chef by profession, arrives at a flat and mesmerises all the housewives in the building with his amazing skills in cooking. He solves several problems within the houses of several families living in the flat and thus gains the trust of everyone. In a food fest he impresses one of the customers who is the director of a channel and gets an opportunity to perform a food show on the channel. He goes to the channel office where he has to perform the cooking show. But the show gets cancelled and he gets trapped in the lift there with Radhika Menon. Inside the lift, he befriends Radhika with his innovative ideas for light and food, and cooks biriyani for her inside the lift. Radhika turns out to be the cinematographer of Gopalakrishnan's food show. Soon they fall in love during the shoot of food show episodes, and they marry with the support of his neighbours and Radhika's rich household. In the middle of their marriage ceremony, Radhika learns that Gopalakrishnan has already married a girl named Mallika and she asked permission from Gopalakrishnan to go with her lover as she was pregnant with her lover's child. Radhika feels upset thinking Gopalakrishnan cheated her without disclosing this information. She refuses to live with Gopalakrishnan. But everyone convinces her to give Gopalakrishnan a chance and she moves in to his house, to a different room, accompanied by her grandmother who fuels her mistrust because she does not like Gopalakrishnan. During that time Gopalakrishnan's friend arrives who is a cook in the army right now and acts as his father. He tries to help Gopalakrishnan win Radhika back, but his plans misfire and lead to problems instead. One day, Radhika comes home to see Mallika leaving the house and this leads to Radhika deciding to end all relations with Gopalakrishnan, and she goes to her home and asks for a divorce from Gopalakrishnan. Saddened by the events Gopalakrishnan drives car in deep mental agony, and ends up getting hit by a lorry. He is however, taken to the hospital on time and his life is saved. Meanwhile, Radhika's father, upon coming to know that Radhika had initiated divorce proceedings against Gopalakrishnan, tells her that Gopalakrishnan had informed him of the marriage with Mallika and her eloping, etc. earlier itself, and he did not convey it to Radhika because he did not consider it relevant. Apparently, Mallika was Gopalakrishnan's uncle's daughter and because he allowed her to elope with her lover, the uncle and sons attacked Gopalakrishnan and he was forced to flee from his hometown. Radhika on being informed about Gopalakrishnan's past and his talks with her father, feels guilty for causing this immense pain for Gopalakrishnan. At the hospital Radhika asks for forgiveness and they reunite there.

== Cast ==
- Dileep as Gopalakrishnan
- Ruchita Prasad as Radhika Menon
- Sonia as Mallika, Gopalakrishnan's first wife
- Innocent as Captain K. G. Nair
- Jagathy Sreekumar as Achayan
- Nedumudi Venu as Menon, Radhika's Father
- Janardhanan as Ramakrishnan
- Cochin Haneefa as Thirupathy, Aanandham's husband
- Kuthiravattam Pappu as Sivaraman
- Zeenath as Sivaraman's wife
- Renuka as Manju, Ramakrishnan's wife
- Manju Pillai as Aanandham
- Vijayan as Vijayan
- Chithra as Vijayan's wife
- Lalithasree
- Philomina as Radhika's Grandmother
- Manka Mahesh as Radhika's Mother
- Kalabhavan Mani as 'Major' Kuttan
- Madhupal as Madhu

== Soundtrack ==
Mister Butler

Soundtrack album by Vidyasagar
- Released: November 6, 1998 (Audio Cassette); January 2000 (Audio CD)
- Labels: Sargam Speed Audios; Satyam Audios

The film's soundtrack contains six songs composed by Vidyasagar, with lyrics by Gireesh Puthenchery. "Virahini Raadhe" is based on raga Dwijavanthi (Jaijaivanti). It was released on 6 November 1998 by Sargam Speed Audios for Audio Cassette format and in January 2000 by Satyam Audios for Audio CD format.

Mr. Butler (Original Motion Picture Soundtrack)
No.	Title	Singer(s)	Length
1.	"Virahini Raadhe"	K. J. Yesudas, K. S. Chitra	5:05
2.	"Nizhalaadum Deepame"	K. J. Yesudas	5:03
3.	"Kunukku Penmaniye"	M. G. Sreekumar, K. S. Chithra, Innocent	3:50
4.	"Raara Venu"	K. S. Chithra, Kalyani Menon	5:03
5.	"Nizhalaadum Deepame"	K. S. Chitra	5:04
6.	"Muthaaram Muthundu"	M. G. Sreekumar, Harini	4:47
