= Diksoochi =

- Theatrical release poster
- Directed by: Dilip Kumar Salvadi
- Written by: Dilip Kumar Salvadi
- Produced by: Narasimha Raju Rachuri; Shailaja Samudrala
- Starring: Dilip Kumar Salvadi; Chatrapathi Sekhar; Chandni Bhagwanani; Sameti Gandhi
- Edited by: Dilip Kumar Salvadi
- Music by: Padmanav Bharadwaj
- Production company: SRS Associates Private Limited
- Release date: 26 April 2019
- Country: India
- Language: Telugu

Diksoochi (transl. Guide) is a 2019 Indian Telugu-language mythological mystery thriller film directed by Dilip Kumar Salvadi starring himself, Chatrapathi Sekhar, Chandni Bhagwanani, and Sameti Gandhi.

The film is about two mistakes: Ravana kidnapping Sita in Treta Yuga and Draupadi during the Dvapara Yuga. The film was released to mixed reviews.

== Cast ==
- Dilip Kumar Salvadi as Dileep
- Chatrapathi Sekhar
- Chandini Bhagwanani
- Sameti Gandhi
- Bithiri Sathi

== Soundtrack ==
The audio release function was held with Bithiri Sathi as the host.

== Reception ==
A critic from The Hans India rated the film 2 3/4 out of 5 and wrote that "Dileep Kumar played multiple roles for the film, as an actor, as a director, and as an editor. He played his part very well in the movie. As a story-teller, he is brilliant and at the same time, as an actor, he is good. He scored good marks in the debut".
