= Naaraayam (film) =

- Directed by: Sasi Shanker
- Starring: Murali; Urvashi; Jagadish; Kalpana
- Release date: 1993
- Country: India
- Language: Malayalam

Narayam is a 1993 Indian Malayalam-language film, directed by Sasi Sankar and stars Murali and Urvashi in lead roles. At 41st National Film Awards, it won the award for Best Film on Other Social Issues.

== Plot ==
Gayathri, born into an impoverished Hindu Namboothiri family in Palakkad, takes up the post of teaching Arabic in a school in Kozhikode. There she is supported in her decision by writer and social activist Shekharan, a widower with an only child, and the manager of the school, Hajiyar. The prospect of a Hindu woman teaching Arabic to Muslim students leads to communal problems, mainly led by three people: Menon who wants to take over the school management, Hajiyar's son-in-law – Azeez – who happened to take a bribe for appointing a Muslim as an Arabic teacher at the school, and the shrewd politician – Chelakkadan – who is waiting for an opportunity to unleash a communal riot and thereby reap electoral votes.

== Cast ==
- Urvashi as Gayathri
- Murali as Shekharan
- Kalpana
- Prathapachandran as Menon
- Vijayaraghavan as Azeez
- Jagadish as Kunjali
- Kuthiravattam Pappu as Warrier
- M. R. Gopakumar as Damodharan Namboothiri
- M. S. Thripunithura as Iyer
- Mamukkoya as Moosa
- N. F. Varghese as Chelakkadan
- Santha Devi as Amina Umma
- Santhakumari
- V. K. Sreeraman as Hajiyar
- Neena Kurup as Hajiyar's Daughter
- Kundara Johny as DEO
- Vijayan Peringodu
- Rajan Padoor as Ramakrishnan
