= Manthra Mothiram =

- Directed by: Sasi Shanker
- Screenplay by: Benny P. Nayarambalam
- Story by: Sasi Shanker
- Produced by: Lallu films
- Starring: Dileep; Nedumudi Venu; Kalabhavan Mani; Hakim Rawther
- Cinematography: Prathapan
- Edited by: A. Sukumaran
- Music by: Johnson
- Production company: Lallu Films
- Distributed by: Lallu Films
- Release date: 28 February 1997
- Country: India
- Language: Malayalam

Manthra Mothiram (transl. Enchanted Ring) is a 1997 Indian Malayalam film, directed by Sasi Shanker. The film stars Dileep, Nedumudi Venu and Kalabhavan Mani in the lead roles.Though failed to find audience initially later did good business due to positive word of mouth. The film has musical score by Johnson.

== Plot ==
Kumaran is a barber who works for his employer Kurup. He is also an artist at his best friend Pappachan's drama troupe which consists of Abdukka, Sundareshan, Vakkachan supported by their Church priest Fr. Vattakuzhi.

== Cast ==
- Dileep as Kumaran
- Kalabhavan Mani as Pappachan
- Nedumudi Venu as CM M.K.S Warrier, Kumaran's father
- Rajan P. Dev as Achuthan, Meenakshi's brother
- Seline as Lakshmi Kurup
- Sathyapriya as Meenakshi, Warrier's wife
- Keerthi Gopinath as Bindhu, Warrier's daughter
- Indrans as Sundareshan
- Mamukkoya as Abdu
- Machan Varghese as Vakkachan
- Oduvil Unnikrishnan as Fr. Vattakuzhi
- N. F. Varghese as Kurup
- Philomina as Mariyamma, Pappachan's mother
- Kanakalatha as Lakshmi's Mother
- Spadikam George as George Anthony
- Ashokan as Prasad
- Swapna Ravi as Kumaran's Mother
- Manka Mahesh as Shakuntala
- Kalady Jayan
- Hakim Rawther - Cameo Appearance

== Soundtrack ==
The music was composed by Johnson.

No.	Song	Singers	Lyrics	Length (m:ss)
1	"Chiraku Thedumee"	G. Venugopal	S. Ramesan Nair	
2	"Manjin Maarkazhi"	M. G. Sreekumar, Sujatha Mohan	S. Ramesan Nair	
