= Perazhagan =

- Theatrical release poster
- Directed by: Sasi Shanker
- Written by: D. P. Singappuli (dialogues)
- Screenplay by: Sasi Shanker
- Story by: Benny P. Nayarambalam
- Produced by: M. Saravanan; M. Balasubramanian; M. S. Guhan; B. Gurunath
- Starring: Suriya; Jyothika
- Cinematography: R. Rathnavelu
- Edited by: Anthony
- Music by: Yuvan Shankar Raja
- Production company: AVM Productions
- Release date: 7 May 2004
- Running time: 148 minutes
- Country: India
- Language: Tamil

Perazhagan (Note: Spelt as Peralagan on the CBFC certificate.) (pronounced [peːɾaɻaɡan] transl. Handsome man) is a 2004 Indian Tamil-language comedy drama film directed by Sasi Shanker and produced by AVM Productions. It is a remake of the director's 2002 Malayalam film Kunjikoonan which itself was adapted from the play Vikalanga Varsham by Benny P. Nayarambalam. The film stars Suriya and Jyothika, each in dual roles, while Vivek, Manorama, Bobby, Thalaivasal Vijay, and Devan play supporting roles. The music was composed by Yuvan Shankar Raja with cinematography by R. Rathnavelu and editing by Anthony. The film released on 7 May 2004. For his performance, Suriya won the Filmfare Award for Best Actor – Tamil and Jyothika won the Tamil Nadu State Film Award for Best Actress.

== Plot ==
Karthik is a violent college student who madly loves his classmate Priya. In contrast to him is his lookalike Chinna alias Prem Kumar, who is a kindhearted village youth with a hunchback and is lauded for selfless service to others. He covers up his disability with humor and optimism. Unmindful of his looks, Chinna goes around looking for a suitable bride with the help of his friend Kuzhandhaisamy, a marriage assembler. Brushing aside many insults hurled at him, he carries on with his life. One day, Priya meets Chinna, who assures her that he will get her married to Karthik for sure.

Priya and Karthik plan to elope with Chinna's help, as her father rejects Karthik. However, she is killed in a fracas by Varadhan, a gangster, as revenge against Priya's father, DCP Nair, who arrested and assaulted him. She dies in Karthik's arms with Nair watching, and Nair arrests Karthik upon thinking that Karthik is responsible for Priya's murder. Chinna saw Varadhan killing Priya, but Varadhan says that he will be killed if he tells anyone what he saw. After Karthik is jailed as Priya's killer, Chinna pleads with Nair and tells the truth behind Priya's murder. Meanwhile, Chinna comes across an orphaned, poor, blind girl named Shenbagam, who is a lookalike of the dead Priya. He won over her heart by helping her out when her brother died.

After Chinna's efforts, Shenbagam gains her vision back. It is revealed that Priya's eyes were actually transplanted into her after her death. This results in a tussle between Chinna and Karthik as to whom Shenbagam now belongs. However, fearing his looks, Chinna decides to give way to Karthik and ends up staying in a temple, where Kuzhandhaisamy finds him and brings him to Shenbagam. Shenbagam does not care about Chinna's looks and accepts him wholeheartedly. Before their marriage, Varadhan returns to seek revenge from Chinna. Karthik arrives at the nick of time, remembering Priya's death; he seeks revenge by brutally beating and killing Varadhan. Karthik gives consent for Chinna and Shenbagam's wedding before being arrested. The film ends with the couple spending their honeymoon in Ooty.

== Cast ==
- Suriya in a dual role as Prem Kumar (Chinna) and Karthik
- Jyothika in a dual role as Shenbagam and Priya Nair
- Vivek as Marriage assembler Kuzhandhaisamy "Kuzhandha", Chinna's best friend
- Manorama as Pattamma, Chinna's grandmother
- Bobby as Varadhan
- Thalaivasal Vijay as Shenbagam's brother
- Devan as DSP Nair, Priya's father
- Manicka Vinayagam as Karthik's father
- Kalairani as Karthik's mother
- Sukumari as Priya's grandmother
- Manobala as Tea Shop Owner
- T. P. Gajendran as Gajendra, Sneha's father
- Periya Karuppu Thevar as Tea Shop Customer
- Chelladurai as Tea Shop Customer
- Cell Murugan as Murugan
- Muthukaalai as Beggar

Uncredited

- Malavika in a cameo role as Chinna's dream wife in the song "Ambuli Mama"
- Chaams as Groom
- Pandu in a cameo role in the song "Ambuli Mama"
- Kili Ramachandran as Kili
- Boys Rajan as Eye Doctor

== Production ==
I knew if a film was remade one would not get a national award. But I wanted to do the remake of the Malayalam hit [Kunjikoonan] in Tamil. That was Perazhagan. But this was for my satisfaction. The hero of the film was much admired by people

— Suriya on Perazhagan

AVM decided to remake the Malayalam film Kunjikoonan and bought the remake rights after being impressed with it. Sasi Shankar, who made the Malayalam original, was chosen to direct the remake too. Unlike the Malayalam original, where two female characters were played by two different actresses, Jyothika enacted both the roles for the Tamil remake. The film was launched on 26 January 2004. This was the 166th film produced by AVM. The film was shot at locations in Kerala, including Ernakulam, Thodupuzha, Kolappra and Kudaiyathur for 25 days. A village set with modest houses and a temple resembling Madurai was designed by Thotta Tharani at Kudayathur.

== Soundtrack ==
The soundtrack was composed by Yuvan Shankar Raja.

Track listing
No.	Title	Lyrics	Singer(s)	Length
1.	"Ambuli Mama"	Palani Bharathi	Karthik	4:12
2.	"Orae Oru Piravi"	Snehan	Hariharan	3:58
3.	"Kadhalukku"	Kabilan	Pushpavanam Kuppusamy, Sri Vardhini	5:18
4.	"Oru Azhagana"	Thamarai	Surya, Savitha Reddy, Ganga Sitharasu, Mathangi	4:51
5.	"Kaatru Enbatha"	Pa. Vijay	Shankar Mahadevan, Mathangi	4:33
Total length:				22:52

== Critical reception ==
A critic from Sify wrote, "The film makes you laugh and cry at the same time. However the highlight of the film is Surya as Chinna and he is extraordinary. Here is one of his most lovable performances as the handicap, though as the morose Karthik, he just passes muster. Jyothika is a revelation (also in her first dual role) as the bubbly Priya and the blind Shenbagham. In her first de-glamorised role as Shenbagham she has proved her histrionics. Vivek for a change has a full length role and he brings the house down with his one-liners. Music by Yuvan is average but the background score is good. Director Sasi Sankar has to be applauded for making a feel-good film without any violence, vulgarity or even bad words". Visual Dasan of Kalki praised Suriya for showing difference in dual roles and the story had unexpected twists. He concluded the review by appreciating AVM for making a film without including an item number. Malathi Rangarajan of The Hindu wrote, "At no point are you allowed to feel that it is the same actor who is playing the physically challenged Chinna and the rough, ardently-in-love Karthik — therein lies [Perazhagan's] strength". G. Ulagananathan of Deccan Herald praised the acting of Surya and Jyothika, Vivek's humour and Sasishankar's direction.

== Accolades ==
Ceremony	Category	Recipient	Result	Ref.
52nd Filmfare Awards South	Best Actor – Tamil	Suriya	Won	
52nd Filmfare Awards South	Best Comedian – Tamil	Vivek	Won	
Tamil Nadu State Film Awards	Best Actress	Jyothika	Won	
Tamil Nadu State Film Awards	Best Lyricist	Snehan	Won	

== Telugu version ==
Upon release, NP Films bought the Telugu remake rights of the film. However, the remake was not made and the Tamil film was instead dubbed in Telugu as Sundarangadu, and released on 26 November 2004.

== In popular culture ==
Suriya briefly appears wearing Chinna's costume in the song "Palla Palla" in Ayan (2009).
