= Benny P. Nayarambalam =

Indian screenwriter

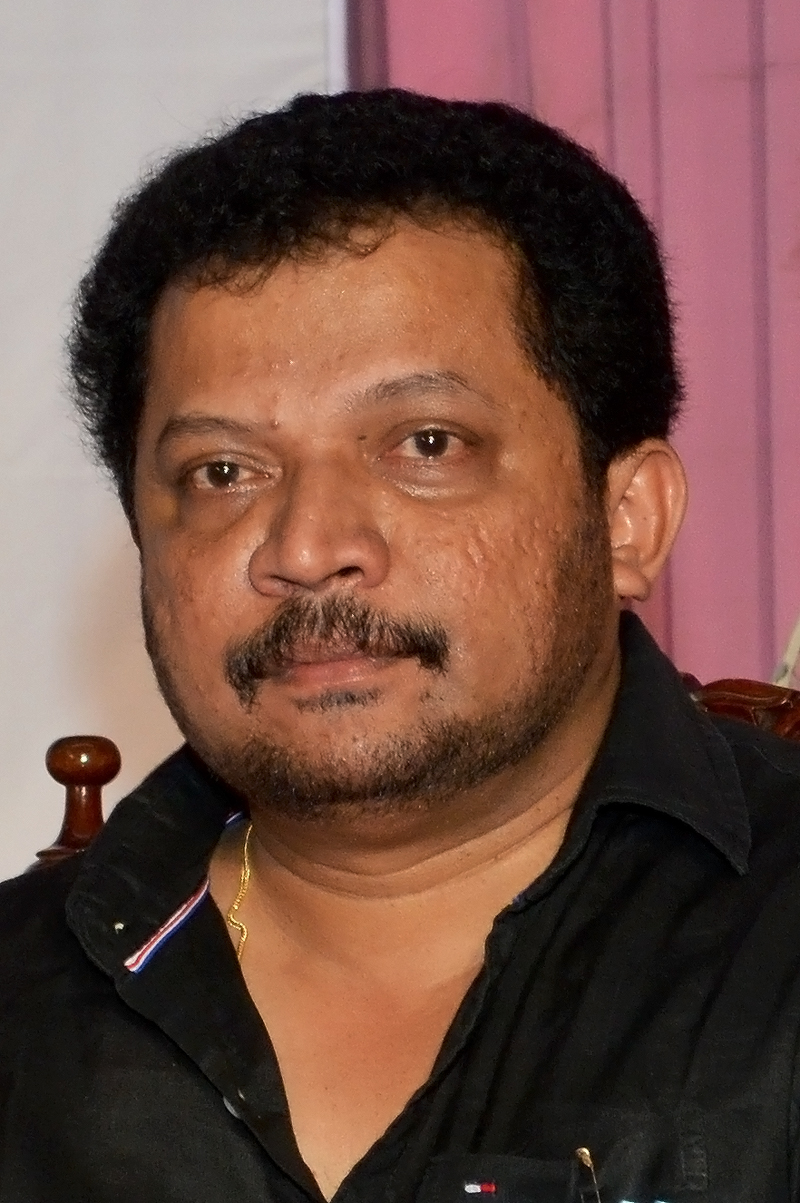
- Born: Nayarambalam, Kerala, India
- Years active: 1992–present
- Spouse: Fulja Benny
- Children: 2, including Anna Ben

Benny P. Nayarambalam is an Indian screenwriter who works in Malayalam films and theatre. He wrote his first theatrical play Athyunnathangalil Deivathinu Sthuthi at the age of 19, for the production company owned by Rajan P. Dev, in which he also performed as Rajan's son. He has a post-graduate degree in Malayalam literature. He made his debut in films as screenwriter through First Bell (1992), directed by P. G. Viswambharan.

Benny had a successful career as a screenwriter, with most of his films turning into blockbusters. And two of his theatre plays Vikalanga Varsham and Arabikkadalum Adbudavilakkum were made into films, Kunjikoonan (2002) and Chanthupottu (2005) respectively. In Chanthupottu, Dileep and Lal played the roles Benny and Rajan P. Dev portrayed in the original play.

== Personal life ==
He is married to Fulja and has two children Anna Ben and Susanna Ben. Anna Ben debuted in Madhu C. Narayanan's first directorial Kumbalangi Nights (2019) as Babymol and received critical acclaim for her commendable performance.

== Filmography ==
Year	Title	Story	Screenplay	Dialogue	Actor	Director	Language	Notes
1992	First Bell	check				P. G. Viswambharan	Malayalam	
1993	Koushalam		check	check		T. S. Mohan	Malayalam	
1995	Keerthanam		check	check		Venu B Nair	Malayalam	
1997	Manthramothiram		check	check		Sasi Shanker	Malayalam	
1997	Junior Mandrake		check	check		Ali Akbar	Malayalam	
1997	Five Star Hospital		check	check		Thaha	Malayalam	
1998	Gramapanchayath		check	check		Ali Akbar	Malayalam	
1998	Achaammakkuttiyude Achaayan	check	check	check		Rajan P. Dev	Malayalam	
1999	Aakasha Ganga	check	check	check		Vinayan	Malayalam	Adapted from his drama Ente Ashamsakal
1999	Vazhunnor	check	check	check		Joshiy	Malayalam	
2002	Naranathu Thampuran	check	check	check		Viji Thampi	Malayalam	
2002	Kalyanaraman	check	check	check		Shafi	Malayalam	
2002	Kunjikoonan	check	check	check		Sasi Shanker	Malayalam	Adapted from his drama Vikalanga Varsham
2004	Perazhagan					Sasi Shanker	Tamil	Remake of his movie Kunjikoonan
2005	Thommanum Makkalum	check	check	check		Shafi	Malayalam	
2005	Chanthupottu	check	check	check		Lal Jose	Malayalam	Adapted from his drama Arabikkadalum Adbudavilakkum
2005	Majaa	check				Shafi	Tamil	Remake of his movie Thommanum Makkalum
2006	Pothan Vava		check	check		Joshiy	Malayalam	
2007	Chotta Mumbai		check	check		Anwar Rasheed	Malayalam	
2008	Annan Thambi	check				Anwar Rasheed	Malayalam	
2008	LollyPop	check				Shafi	Malayalam	
2009	Chattambinadu		check			Shafi	Malayalam	
2010	Marykkundoru Kunjaadu	check				Shafi	Malayalam	
2012	Puthiya Theerangal	check				Sathyan Anthikkad	Malayalam	
2012	Spanish Masala	check				Lal Jose	Malayalam	
2013	Sound Thoma	check				Vysakh	Malayalam	
2013	Daivathinte Swantham Cleetus	check				G. Marthandan	Malayalam	Directional debut of G. Marthandan
2014	Bhaiyya Bhaiyya	check				Johny Antony	Malayalam	check
2016	Welcome to Central Jail	check	check	check		Sundar Das	Malayalam	
2017	Velipadinte Pusthakam	check	check	check		Lal Jose	Malayalam	
2021	Sara's				check	Jude Anthany Joseph	Malayalam	As actor
2023	Anchu Centum Celeenayum				check	Jexson Antony	Malayalam	As actor
2023	Enthada Saji				check	Godfy Xavier Babu	Malayalam	As actor
2023	Voice of Sathyanathan				check	Rafi	Malayalam	As actor
