= Radhika Thilak =

Indian Malayalam playback singer (1969–2015)

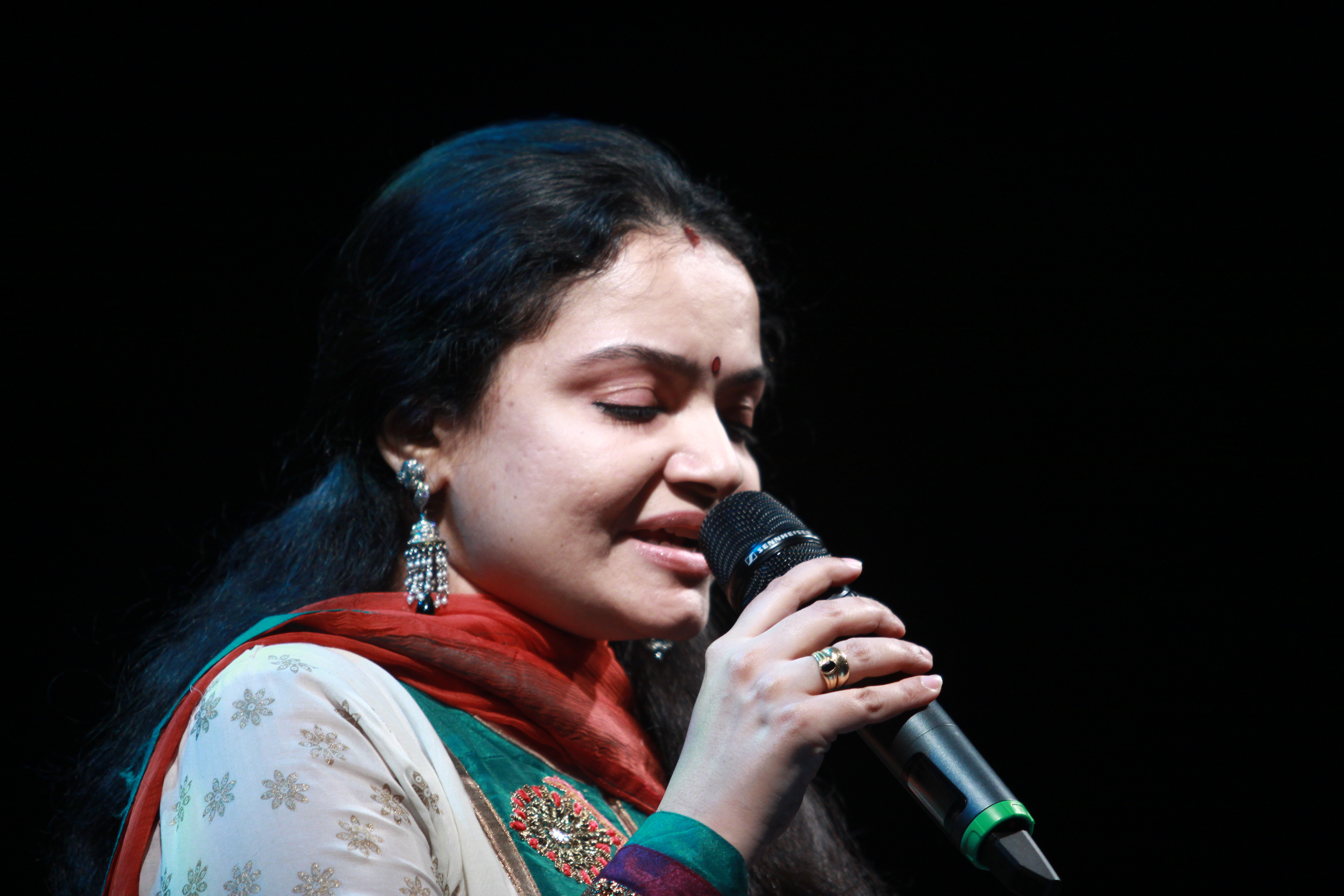
- Thilak in 2014
- Born: 1969
- Died: 20 September 2015 (aged 45–46); Kochi, Kerala
- Education: St. Teresa's College, Kochi
- Occupation: Playback singer
- Spouse: Suresh Krishna
- Children: 1
- Relatives: Paravoor T. K. Narayana Pillai (grandfather); G. Venugopal (cousin); Sujatha Mohan (cousin)

Radhika Jayathilakan (1969 – 20 September 2015), known by her stage name Radhika Thilak, was an Indian playback singer who predominantly worked in the Malayalam film industry. She sang 70 songs for Malayalam films.

== Early life ==
Radhika was born into a family of musicians to Jayathilakan and Girija Devi. She was educated at Chinmaya Vidyalaya and at St. Teresa's College in Kochi. She was a winner of the light music competition held by the MG University. Playback singers G. Venugopal and Sujatha Mohan are her cousins.

Radhika died on 20 September 2015, after a prolonged battle with cancer. She is survived by her husband, Suresh, and daughter, Devika.

== Career ==
Some of her songs are "Arunakirana Deepam", "Deva Sangeetham", "Maya Manchalil", "Kaithapoo Manam", "Thiruvathira Thira Nokkiya", "Ente Ulludukkum Kotti" and "Ninte Kannil". Her song "Ilampani Thuli" from Tamil film Aaradhanai (1981) is well remembered. Apart from film songs, she also sang 200 devotional songs. She was also a TV anchor.

=== Awards ===
In 2002 Kerala film critics association awarded her best female playback singer award for her song Omanamalare Ninmaran from the film Kunjikoonan.

== Discography ==
- Maayamanjalil - Ottayal Pattalam (1991)
- Devasangeetham Neeyalle - Guru (1997)
- Arunakirana Deepam - Guru (1997)
- Manjakkiliyude Moolipattunde - Kanmadam (1998)
- Kaithapoo Manamente - Sneham (1998)
- Ninte Kannil Virunnu - Deepasthambham Mahashcharyam (1999)
- Ente ulludukkum Kotti - Deepasthambham Mahashcharyam (1999)
- Thangamanassin - Sundara Purushan (2001)
- Omanamalare Nin Maaran - Kunjikoonan (2002)
- Manassil Midhunamazha - Nandanam (2002)
- Kananakuyile Kathil Idaanoru - Mr. Brahmachari (2003)
- Vennakkallil Ninnekothi - Pattalam (2003)

== Death ==
On 20 September 2015, Radhika was admitted to a private hospital in Kochi in the evening and was declared dead at around 8:00PM. She was 45. Radhika had been undergoing treatment for cancer for nearly two years.
