= Majaa =

- Poster
- Directed by: Shafi
- Screenplay by: Viji
- Story by: Benny P Nayarambalam
- Based on: Thommanum Makkalum
- Produced by: Rockline Venkatesh
- Starring: Vikram; Asin; Pasupathy
- Cinematography: Balasubramaniem
- Edited by: V. T. Vijayan
- Music by: Vidyasagar
- Production company: Rockline Entertainment
- Distributed by: Aascar Films International
- Release date: 1 November 2005
- Running time: 138 minutes
- Country: India
- Language: Tamil

Majaa (transl. Fun) is a 2005 Indian Tamil-language action comedy film directed by Shafi and produced by Rockline Venkatesh. It is a remake of the director's own Malayalam film Thommanum Makkalum (2005). The film stars Vikram, Asin, and Pasupathy, while Manivannan, Vadivelu, Vijayakumar, Biju Menon (in his Tamil debut), Murali, and Abu Salim (reprising his role from the original) play supporting roles. The music was composed by Vidyasagar. It tells the story of two adopted children changing from their old, mischievous ways of life.

== Plot ==
Govindan is a thief who has two sons: Aadhi and Mathi. Years go by, and the brothers decide to stop stealing, mend their ways, and lead a hardworking life with their father. They migrate to a neighboring village named Devalapatti and meet a retired agricultural officer Chidambaram, who is in deep debt and is under pressure from the village landlord Kalingarayar to clear his debts. In efforts to help Chidambaram, Mathi confronts Seetha Lakshmi, Kalingarayar's daughter, who comes to collect the money Chidambaram owes her father. Seetha Lakshmi starts to acquire a liking for Mathi but keeps it hidden due to her father's atrocious temper. In an attempt to teach Kalingarayar a lesson, Mathi forcibly ties the mangalasutra around Seetha's neck. Kalingarayar, realizing his daughter's love for Mathi, comes down to arrange a grand remarriage between the two. However, things go awry when Rajavelu, Seetha Lakshmi's maternal uncle, comes to town in an effort to stop the wedding between the two as he has wicked plans of marrying Seetha Lakshmi and usurping her family fortune.

== Cast ==
- Vikram as Arivumathi "Mathi"
- Asin as Seetha Lakshmi
- Pasupathy as Aadhi Kesavan "Aadhi"
- Manivannan as Govindan
- Vadivelu as Pulipaandi
- Aadukalam Naren as Ramakrishnan
- Vijayakumar as Chidambaram
- Biju Menon as Rajavelu (Voice dubbed by P. Ravi Shankar)
- Murali as Kalingarayar
- Anu Prabhakar as Selvi
- Nithin Sathya as Muthu, Chidambaram's son
- T. P. Gajendran as Doctor
- Ilavarasu
- Mahanadi Shankar
- Muthukaalai
- Crane Manohar
- Abu Salim as Manickam, Rajavelu's henchman
- Sindu Tolani (special appearance in the song "Ayyarettu")
- Ram Lakshman as Ramudu & Bheemudu

== Production ==
Vikram revealed that he watched the original Malayalam film and approached its director about remaking it in Tamil. The film was primarily shot at Pollachi. Though the title Majaa received criticism from the media due to its perceived suggestiveness, the makers refused to change it.

== Soundtrack ==
The music was composed by Vidyasagar.

Song title	Singers	Lyrics
"Ayyarettu Naattukettu"	Shankar Mahadevan, Anuradha Sriram, Ganga Sitharasu	P. Vijay
"Chi Chi Chi"	Shankar Mahadevan, Harini, Savitha Reddy, Karthik, Manikka Vinayagam	Yugabharathi
"Hey Pangaali"	Udit Narayan, Tippu, Manikka Vinayagam	P. Vijay
"Podhumadaa Saami"	Kailash Kher	P. Vijay
"Sollitharavaa"	Madhu Balakrishnan, Sadhana Sargam	Kabilan

== Release ==
The film was released on 1 November 2005, Diwali day, alongside Sivakasi and Adhu Oru Kana Kaalam.

=== Critical reception ===
Sify wrote, "The major flaw of Majaa is its wafer-thin story and screenplay, a mediocre subject to be remade from Malayalam [...] the film gives you a dreary sense of déjà vu, a feeling that one has seen it before". Malini Mannath from Chennai Online wrote that "'Thomanum Makkalum', the film's original Malayalam version, in which Mammootty starred, had some perfect casting for the trio. But here the combination of Vikram, Pasupathi and Manivannan somehow fails to jell together as a team". A critic from webindia123 wrote that "Overall it is a clean family entertainer worth a watch".

Lajjavathi of Kalki praised the humour and performances of Vadivelu, Pasupathy and Manivannan but felt Asin and Murali were wasted, Vidyasagar did not score well while panning Thaali sentiment scenes, crippling screenplay and lengthy dialogues. He was surprised by Vikram for choosing this film and she do not want to get him wasted in weak plots. S. R. Ashok Kumar of The Hindu wrote "Getting an opening from an established producer like Rockline Venkatesh and with Vikram in the lead, director Shafi should have made the effort to make the fare more interesting". G. Ulaganathan of Deccan Herald wrote "One word to describe the movie--Bad. One wonders how the original film in Malayalam, Thommanum Makklalum clicked. This Tamil version is a rehash of hundred and odd old films and the only novel feature is that instead of the mother-son sentiment, there is father-sons sentiment".

=== Box office ===
It was declared an average grosser.
