= Pamena =

- Village
- Location in Telangana, India Pamena (India)
- Coordinates: 17.1627°N 78.0719°E
- Country: India
- State: Telangana
- District: Ranga Reddy
- Metro: Hyderabad

Government
  - Body: Mandal Office

Area
  - Total: 3.83 km^{2} (1.48 sq mi)

Population (2011)
  - Total: 1,478
  - Density: 386/km^{2} (999/sq mi)

Languages
  - Official: Telugu
- Time zone: UTC+5:30 (IST)
- PIN: 501503
- Vehicle registration: TG-07
- Planning agency: Panchayat
- Civic agency: Mandal Office
- Website: telangana.gov.in

Pamena is a village and panchayat in Ranga Reddy district, Telangana, India. It falls under Chevella mandal. Pamena a village is on the Chevella-Shadnagar road route. It also a part of Hyderabad Metropolitan Development Authority.

== Demographics ==
Pamena is a medium size village located in Chevella of Rangareddy district. Telangana with total 321 families residing. The Pamena village has population of 1478 of which 740 are males while 738 are females as per Population Census 2011.

In Pamena village population of children with age 0-6 is 134 which makes up 9.07% of total population of village. Average Sex Ratio of Pamena village is 997 which is higher than Telangana state average of 993. Child Sex Ratio for the Pamena as per census is 1094, higher than Andhra Pradesh average of 939.

Pamena village has higher literacy rate compared to Andhra Pradesh. In 2011, literacy rate of Pamena village was 67.26% compared to 67.02% of Andhra Pradesh. In Pamena Male literacy stands at 78.70% while female literacy rate was 55.69%.

As per the constitution of India and Panchyati Raaj Act, Pamena village is administered by a sarpanch (head of village) who is an elected representative.

- Caste Factoter

Schedule Castes constitutes 0.27% of total population in Pamena village. The village Pamena currently doesn't have any Schedule Tribe population.

- Work Profile

In Pamena village out of total population, 815 were engaged in work activities. 96.69% of workers describe their work as Main Work (Employment or Earning more than 6 Months) while 3.31% were involved in Marginal activity providing livelihood for less than 6 months. Of 815 workers engaged in Main Work, 471 were cultivators (owner or co-owner) while 210 were Agricultural labourer.

== Important Festivals ==
Bathukamma and Lashkar Bonalu are states official festivals besides these Dussehra, Diwali, Holi, Sri Ramanavami, Shivaratri, Ugadi, Ganesh Chaturthi are the major festivals celebrated in Pamena.
