= Birla Institute of Technology and Science, Pilani – Hyderabad Campus =

University campus in Telangana, India

Coordinates: 17°32′47.39″N 78°34′21.00″E

Birla Institute of Technology and Science, Pilani - Hyderabad Campus
- Motto: ज्ञानं परम् बलं Gyanam paramam balam
- Motto in English: "Knowledge is Supreme Power"
- Type: Private Deemed University, Institute of Eminence
- Established: 2008; 18 years ago
- Affiliations: BITS, Pilani
- Chancellor: Kumar Mangalam Birla
- Vice-Chancellor: V. Ramgopal Rao
- Director: Prof. Dharmarajan Sriram
- Administrative staff: 160+
- Students: 5,450
- Undergraduates: 4,365
- Location: Jawahar Nagar Corporation, Kapra Mandal, Secunderabad City, Hyderabad North East, Telangana, India
- Campus: 275 acres (111 ha); Suburban
- Website: www.bits-pilani.ac.in/Hyderabad/

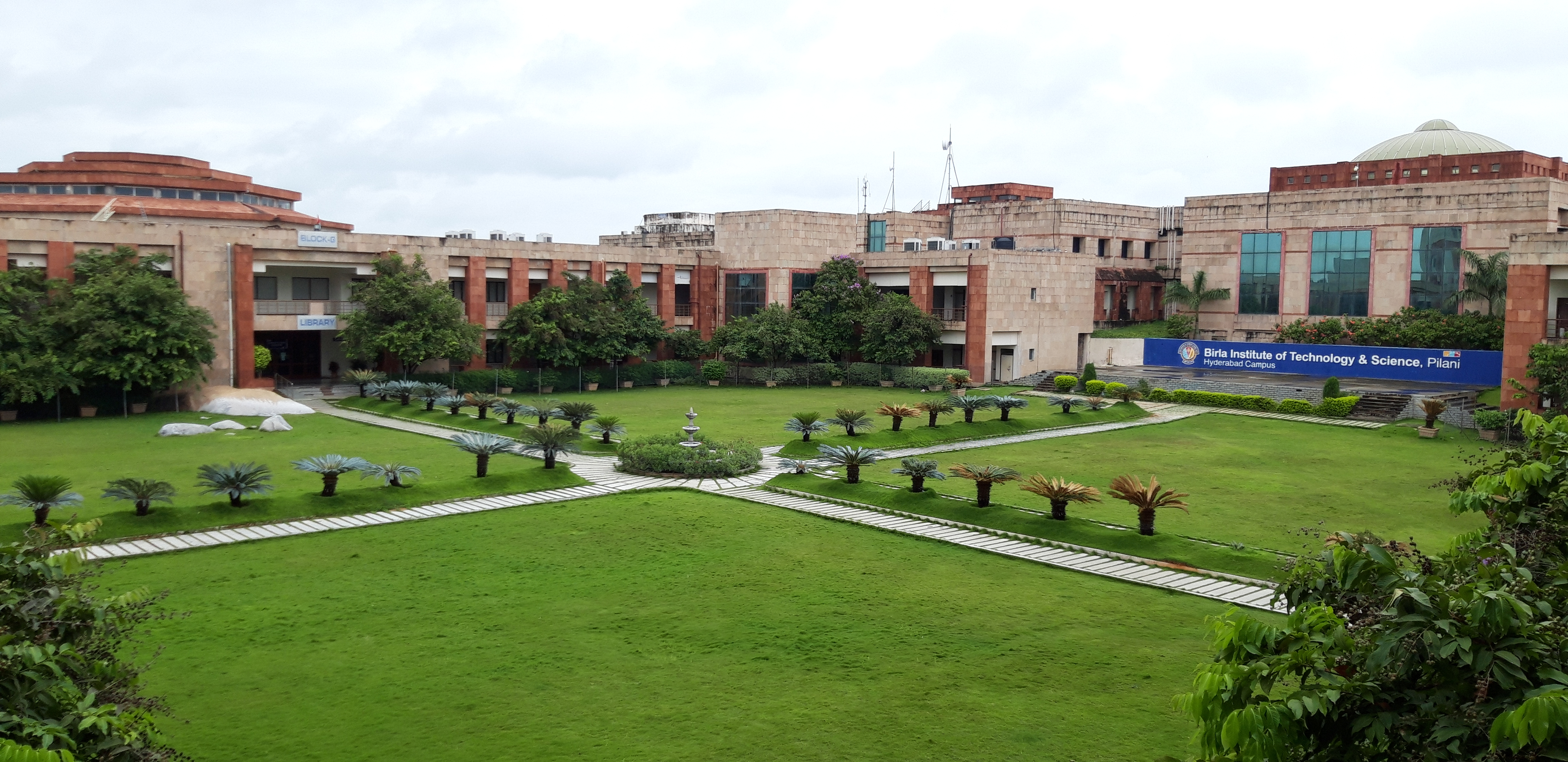
BITS Pilani – Hyderabad Campus

The Birla Institute of Technology and Science, Pilani (BITS Pilani) Hyderabad Campus is one of the five constituent campuses of the BITS Pilani located in Hyderabad, India. BITS opened its campus in Hyderabad upon invitation by the Government of Andhra Pradesh in 2008 with the first batch of campus graduating in 2012. It is a technical and research institute with focus on Engineering and Sciences.

== History ==
=== Early days ===
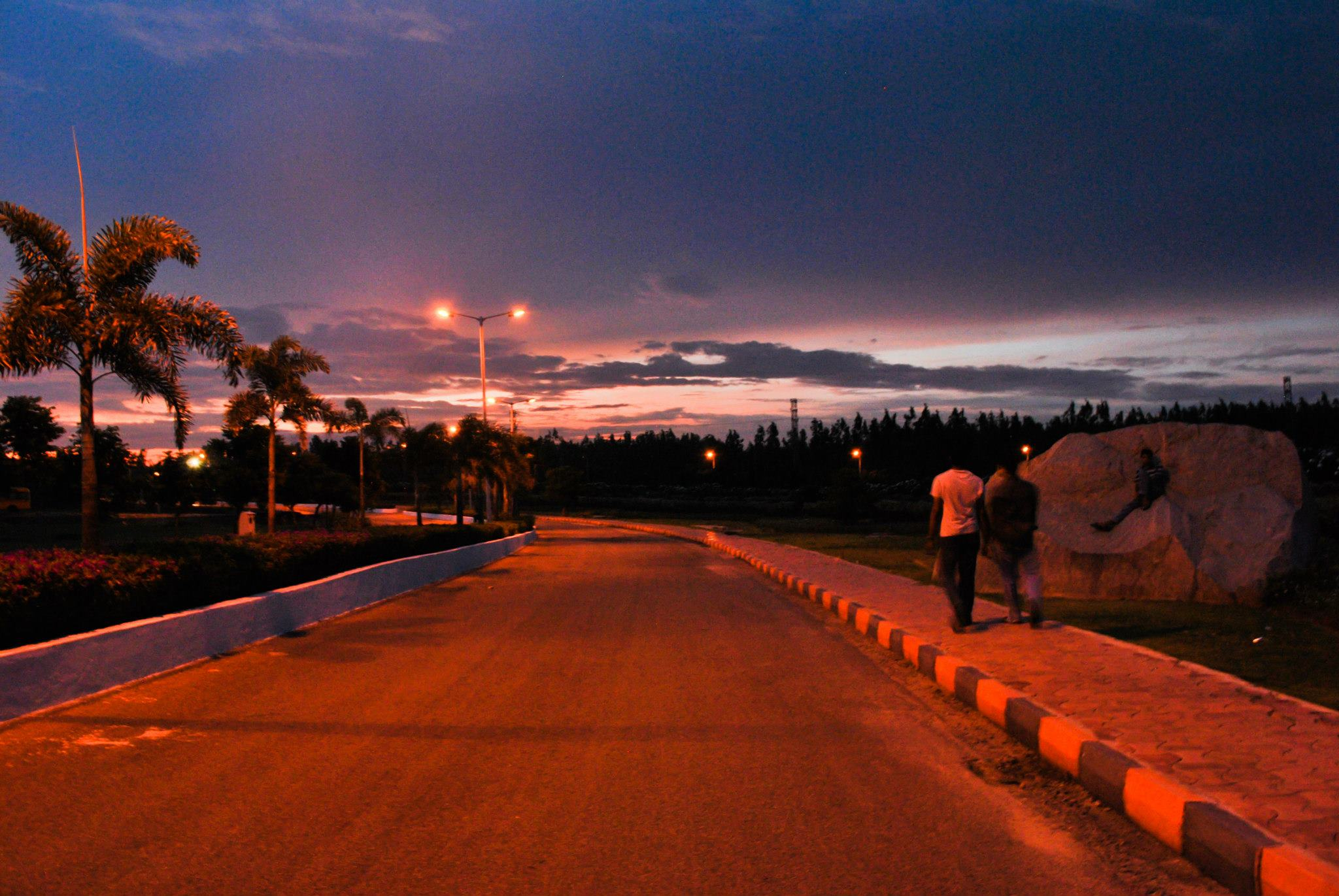
The road leading up to the academic block from the main gate is called the Marine Drive by the students

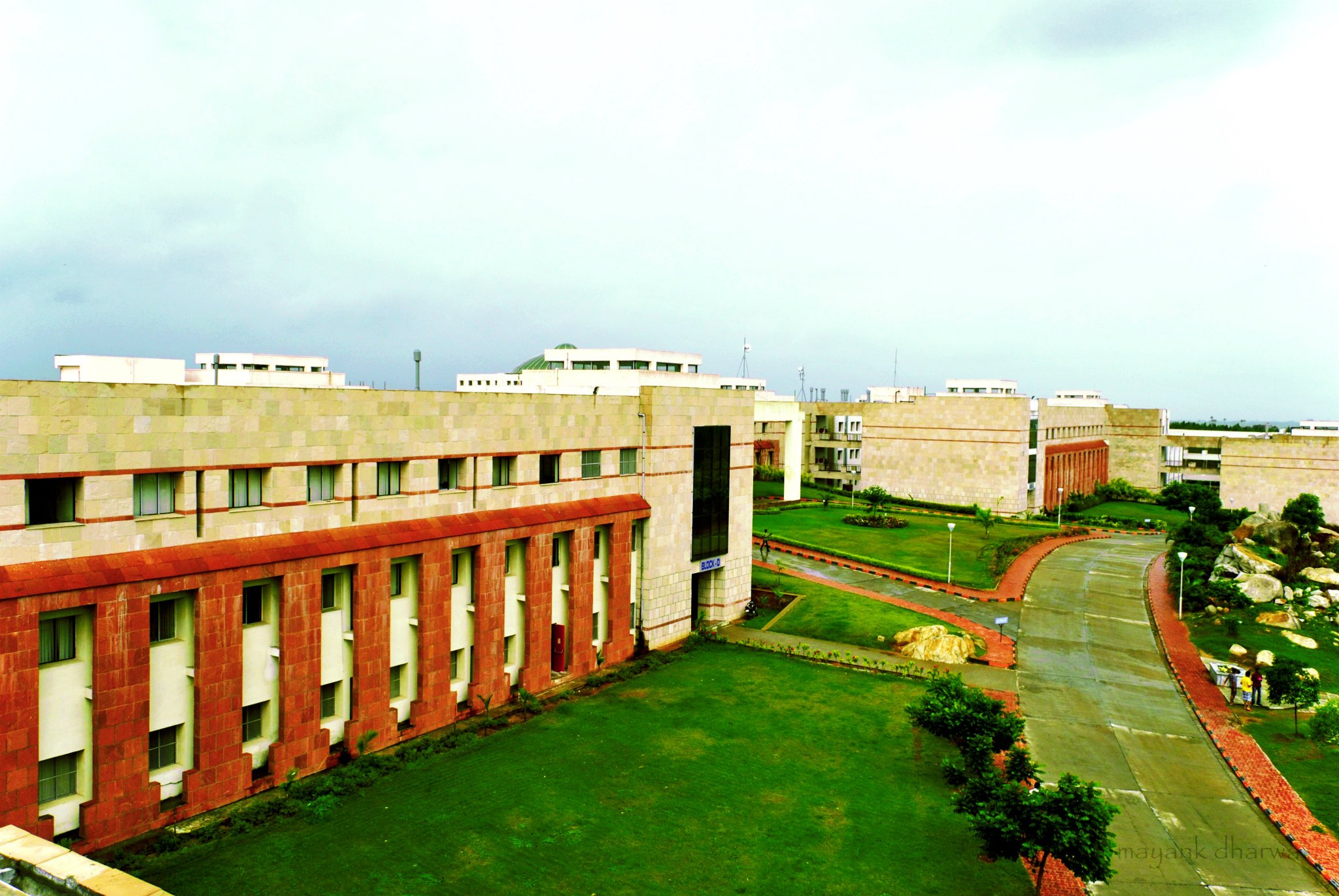
This is the area right in front of the Academic Block

The Hyderabad Campus' foundation stone was laid in the presence of the then Chief Minister of the State Y.S. Rajasekhara Reddy on 27 April 2007. The institute became a functioning entity in 2008.

BITS also runs a virtual university and an extension centre in Bangalore, Chennai and several important cities of India to cater to the academic needs of Industry.

=== Expansion ===
BITS Pilani, Hyderabad Campus is to eventually have ten centres in order to step up activities in research and development in pharmaceutics, mechanics, computer technology and construction engineering.

Out of all the campuses of the BITS Pilani university, the Hyderabad campus is the one which has taken charge of developing a course for Electronics and Communications Engineering. This is because of the campus's presence in Hyderabad, which is notable for a large talent pool in this area. The Goa campus started offering Electronics & Communication Engineering from the academic year 2017–18.

== Academics ==
=== Admission ===
Since 2005, admission to the Undergraduate programmes to the Indian campuses of BITS has been offered to students based on their performance in the all-India Entrance Examination, called BITS Admission Test (BITSAT). BITS Pilani also has the policy of accepting State and National Board toppers from India. From 2015, the institute also started accepting international students on the basis of performance in the SAT Subject Tests in Physics, Chemistry, and Math II followed by an interview. BITS does not implement any State-based or caste/religion based quotas during admission.

=== Research and development projects ===
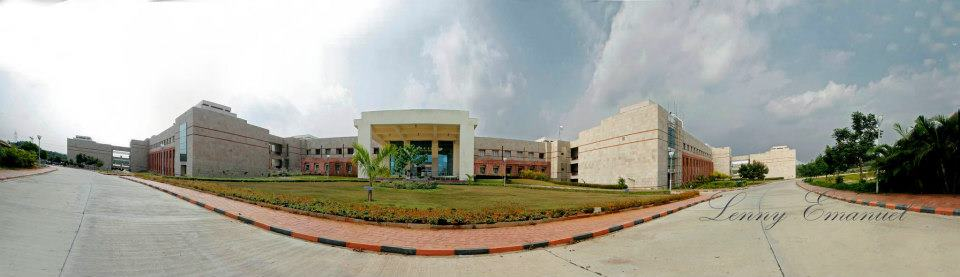
A panorama of the Academic Block

The college has many R&D projects under its departments. These projects take the form of research-based consultancy, sponsored projects or just independent R&D. Some collaborators include the Science and Engineering Research Council (DST-SERC), the University Grants Commission (UGC), the National Programme for Micro and Smart System (NPMASS), AstraZeneca, etc. The funding for these projects runs into several crores. The campus has a Center of Excellence in MEMS, Microfluidics and Nanoelectronics (MMNE) which is one top academic CoE of its kind in India.

== Campus ==
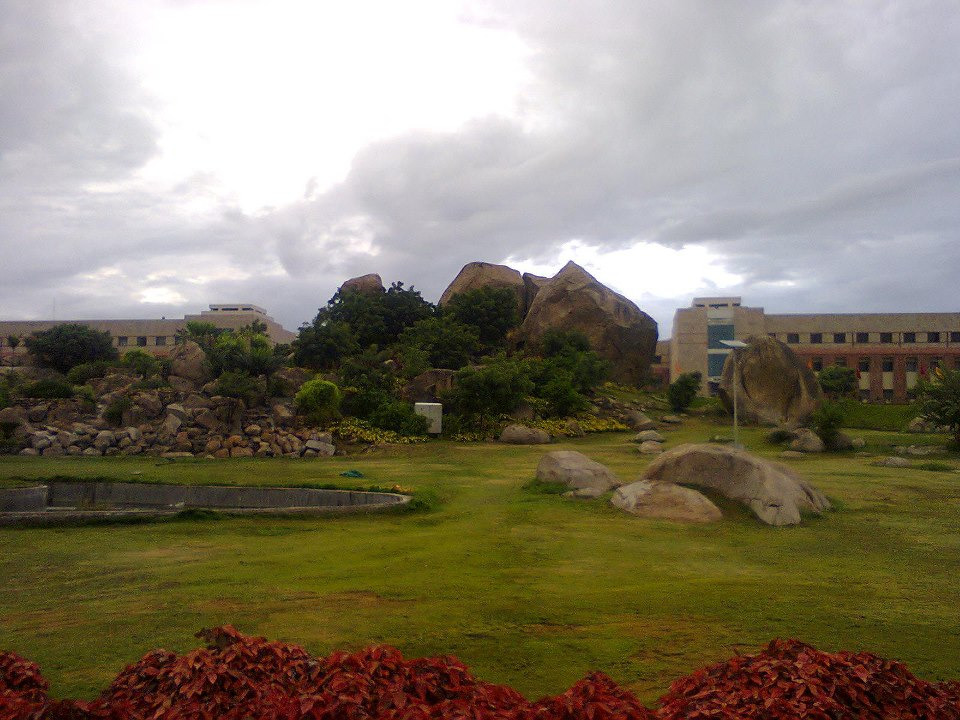
Rock Garden in front of Academic block

=== Second phase of construction ===
The foundation stone for the second phase of campus development was laid by the IT Minister of Telangana, K. T. Rama Rao on 20 February 2016. The state allocated additional 75 acres (30 hectares) to the institute to facilitate its phase-II expansion plans making it the largest physical campus of BITS Pilani. The architect for the campus is Hafeez Contractor.

== Events ==
=== Pearl ===
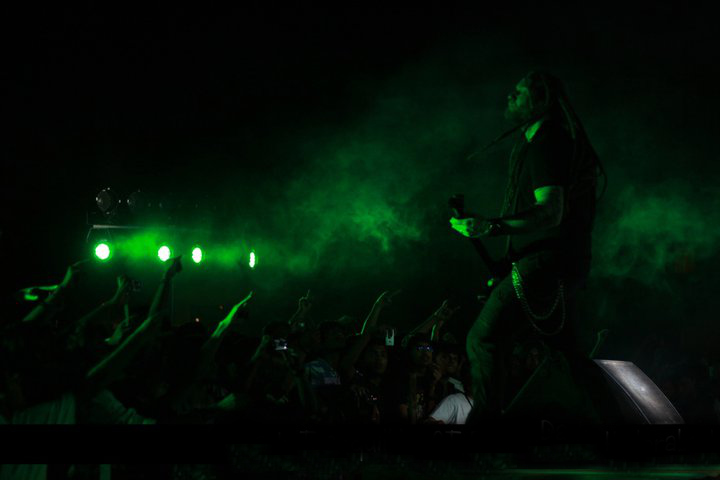
Dark Tranquility performing at Pearl 2011

Pearl is held in March and features competitions in quiz, music, dance and literary events. The first Pearl was held in 2010. The second edition of Pearl in February 2011 was headlined by the Swedish death metal band, Dark Tranquillity. Thurisaz, a metal band from Belgium, performed at Pearl 2012. In 2013, Pearl saw performances by Junkyard Groove, Amplifier and Nikhil Chinappa.

=== ATMOS ===
ATMOS is the Techno-Management Fest of the campus. The First edition was organized on 26 and 27 October 2012 and featured Paper presentations, Technical competitions and Workshops on various disciplines. The next edition was scheduled from 11 October to 13 October 2013. ATMOS aims at improving the technical culture among Indian colleges as well as providing a platform to showcase their abilities. In its eighth year now, ATMOS is growing rapidly with participation from students, academicians, entrepreneurs and speakers from all over India. Each year, a diverse range of challenging and educative Quizzes, Competitions, Case studies, Workshops and Conferences are held, along with interactive sessions with renowned speakers from across the Country.

The fest has also received patronage from the Government initiative Make in India. BITSMUN Hyderabad and Enigma-The National quiz are held during ATMOS. The Tech Expo had participants from across the country.

=== Arena ===
Arena is the national annual sports festival of the campus. The major tournaments it features are cricket, ultimate frisbee, hockey football, throwball, basketball, badminton, table tennis, chess, carrom, athletics, tennis, volleyball and power lifting.

=== TEDxBITSHyderabad ===
The first edition of TEDxBITSHyderabad was held on 25 November 2012. There were a total of 12 speakers, including the four student speakers selected by a panel.

=== Verba Maximus ===
Twelve editions of the Literary fest, Verba Maximus, have taken place until now. The first was in 2012, most recently in 2024. The fest offers a host of events, all literary in nature, as well as visits by authors and other notable literary figures. Verba Maximus 2013 saw a visit by bestselling author of the Shiva Trilogy, Amish Tripathi. The fest has traditionally ended with a comedy show. Both editions of Verba Maximus 2012 and 2013 have featured Saurabh Pant. Other Comedians who have performed at Verba Maximus over the years are Kenny Sebastian, Biswa Kalyan Rath, Raunaq Rajani and Kunal Rao.

While most of the fest is organised by The English Language Activities Society (ELAS), each version of the fest has seen ELAS collaborating with the Journal Club, the Photography Club, Music Club, SaFL Club (Sanskrit and Foreign Languages), Fashion club, the Hindi Club, Brindavanam (Telugu Association) and the Quiz Club.The events Conducted by ELAS are Just a Minute (JAM), Sherlocked (Murder Mystery), Devils Advocate, Shipwrecked, Ying Yang, Twisted Tales, Spelling bee and many such events.

=== MUN ===
From BITSMUN 2011, the first college level Model United Nations Conference in the state BITSMUN 2013 grew into an international MUN conference with over 200 delegates shortlisted from 700 applications.

== Departments ==
=== Biological Sciences ===
The Department of Biological Sciences (DoBS) offers Integrated M.Sc. (Hons.), M.E. Biotechnology and Ph.D. degree programs. The department is DST-FIST funded and has received DST-PURSE and DBT-builder grants. Currently, the department has 24 faculty members including recipients of DBT-Ramalingaswami Re-Entry fellows, DST-Ramanujan fellows and Wellcome Trust-DBT fellows. The department is currently headed by renowned Professor Ch. Mohan Rao, who offers valuable research guidance, contributing significantly to the department's academic development. The department hosts the Intracellular Parasite Education and Research Labs (iPEARL), a center focused on host-pathogen interactions and molecular parasitology. The faculty members get funding from various government funding agencies in India for performing research in different areas including genomics, immunology, molecular biology, neuroscience, industrial microbiology and plant biotechnology.

=== Chemistry ===
The Department of Chemistry at BITS Pilani focuses on teaching and research across diverse areas, including green chemistry, nanomaterials, polymers, soft materials, spectroscopy, energy research, bio-organic and medicinal chemistry, supramolecular chemistry, environmental analytical chemistry, synthetic organic chemistry, and computational chemistry. Currently, the department has 25 faculty members, including Prof. B M Reddy (former Chief Scientist, CSIR-IICT), and Prof. D. Ramaiah, (former Director, CSIR-NEIST). The department is supported by national funding agencies and international grants and is equipped with state-of-the-art analytical and characterization instruments.

== Administration ==
It is one of the constituent campuses of BITS Pilani. Therefore, graduating students are awarded degrees from BITS Pilani.

The administration is divided into eight divisions:

- Faculty Affairs
- Sponsored Research and Consultancy (SRCD)
- International Programmes and Collaboration
- Practice School
- Student Welfare Division (SWD)
- Academic - Undergraduate Studies Division (AUGSD)
- Academic - Graduate Studies and Research Division (AGSRD)
- Alumni Relations

== Other campuses of BITS Pilani ==
- Dubai Campus
- Goa Campus
- Pilani Campus
- Mumbai Campus
