= Sasi Shanker =

Indian film director (1967–2016)

- Born: 1957
- Died: 10 August 2016 (aged 58–59)
- Occupation: Film director
- Spouse: Beena Shanker
- Children: 2

Sasi Shanker (1957 – 10 August 2016) was an Indian film director. He directed a total of twelve films including ten Malayalam films and two Tamil films. He won the National Film Award for Best Film on Other Social Issues in 1993 for his directorial debut film Naaraayam.

== Career ==
Shanker pursued his career in filmmaking as an assistant director to the prominent Malayalam director P. A. Backer and Shanker collaborated with Backer in three of his films. He later joined hands with Sathyan Anthikad as his assistant director with whom he had worked in nearly 30 films.

After gaining a significant learning curve and knowledge by being an assistant director in over 30 films, he plied his trade by venturing into independent filmmaking. He eventually made rapid strides and a phenomenal start to his career as a fully fledged film director, as his debut film, Naarayam, fetched him the prestigious national film award at the 41st National Film Awards. It also marked his first Malayalam film, and the critical reception upon the release of his debut film caught the attention of the film fraternity, and he followed it up with other directorial ventures including Punnaram (1995), Manthra Mothiram (1997), Guru Sishyan (1997), Mister Butler (2000) and Kunjikoonan (2002). His directorial venture Kunjikoonan was well received upon release, for its unique storytelling and execution and the film became a commercial success at the box office while it also endured a nearly 100 days run in the box office. He made his Tamil debut as a film director with Suriya starrer Perazhagan (2004), as the film itself was a remake of Shanker's own Malayalam-language film Kunjikoonan. According to insider sources, it was reportedly Suriya who himself had invited Shanker on board to discuss the possibility of remaking the Kunjikoonan film in Tamil-language, which Shanker had been willing to do upon negotiations.

== Death ==
He died on 10 August 2016 at the age of 58 after suffering from diabetes in the preceding years. He died at his residence at Pancode, a village which is located near Kolanchery. He had been under treatment for diabetes for a few years prior to his death, and his deteriorating health conditions eventually ended his chances of making a comeback as a director in mainstream cinema.

== Filmography ==
=== As a film director ===
Year	Film	Language	Notes
1993	Naaraayam	Malayalam	
1995	Punnaram	Malayalam	
1997	Manthra Mothiram	Malayalam	
1997	Guru Sishyan	Malayalam	
2000	Mr. Butler	Malayalam	
2002	Kunjikoonan	Malayalam	
2004	Perazhagan	Tamil	
2005	Sarkar Dada	Malayalam	
2014	Pagadai Pagadai	Tamil	

=== As a writer ===
Year	Film	Writer	Language	Notes
1991	Souhrudam	Story	Malayalam	
1992	Ponnaramthottathe Raajaavu	Story	Malayalam	
