= 6TV Telangana =

Indian Telugu-language television news channel

6TV Telangana 6TV తెలంగాణ
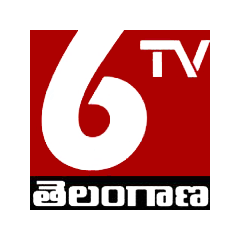
- Country: India
- Headquarters: Hyderabad, Telangana, India

Programming
- Language: Telugu
- Picture format: 1080i (HDTV); (some affiliates transmit 6TV programming in 720p 16:9); 576i (SDTV 4:3/16:9)

History
- Launched: 3 July 2012

Links
- Website: http://6tvtelugu.com/

6TV Telangana is a Telugu news television channel in the Indian State of Telangana. The channel focuses on the culture of Telangana.

== History ==
On 3 July 2014 Hyderabad-based LCGC Broadcasting India headed by Suresh Reddy launched the Channel for the newly created state Telangana while its sister channel 6TV will have its presence in both the Telugu Speaking States.

== Programming and Distribution ==
The Channel 6TV Telangana will be more localised with news reading in Telugu. The programming will also depicts the lifestyle of Telangana People. 6TV Telangana will have three bureaus in Hyderabad, Warangal and Nizamabad.

== Tragedies ==
News Reader Ramana who is an active member of the channel had an untimely demise on 3 March 2015. The News reader Ramana died at a very young age of 28 due to heart attack.
