= Vini Vishwa Lal =

Indian screenwriter (born 1985)

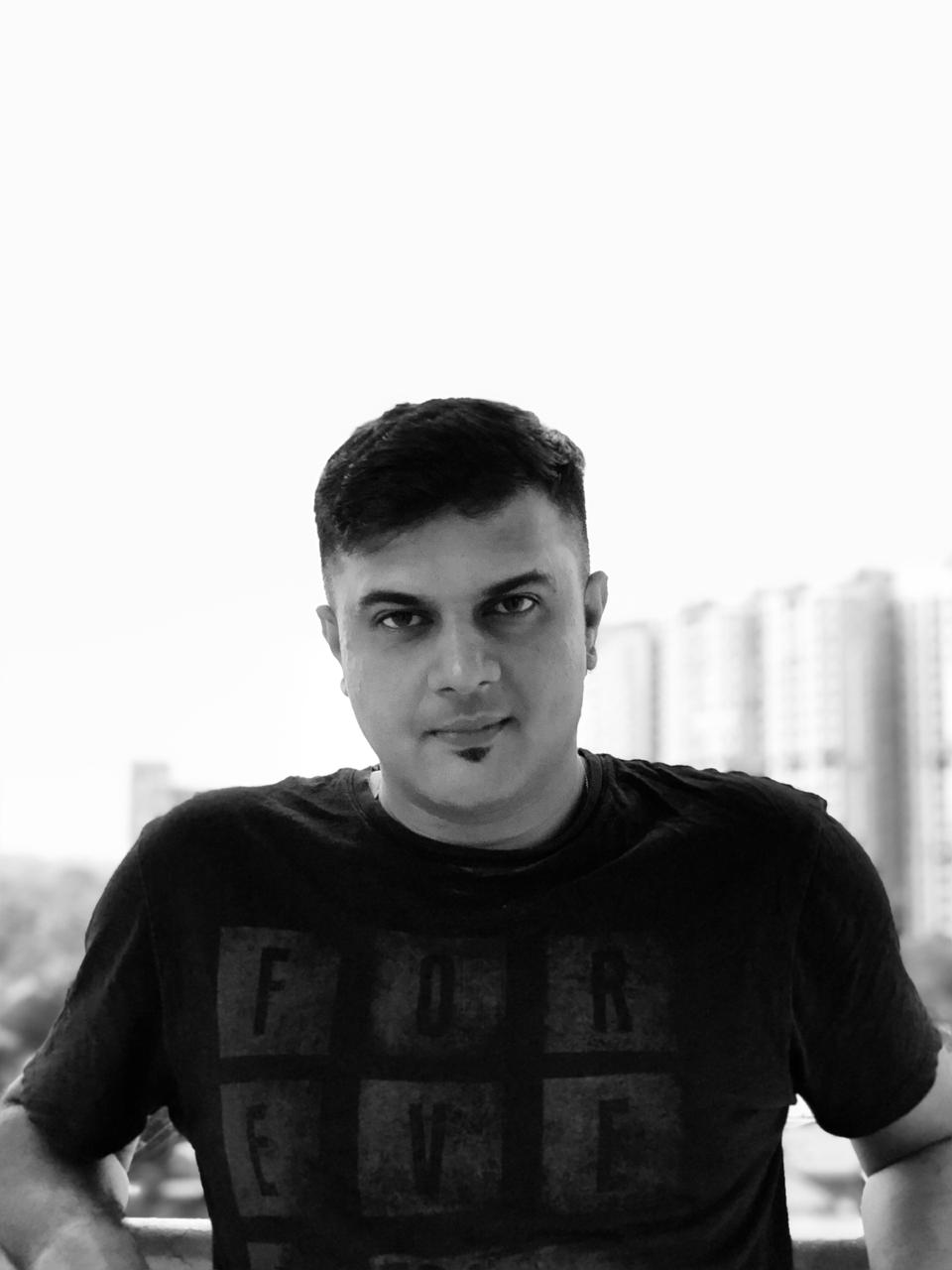
- Viswa in 2017
- Born: 25 May 1985 (age 40); Pathanamthitta, Pathanamthitta, Kerala, India
- Occupations: Screenwriter, Actor
- Years active: 2012–present
- Parent(s): G Viswanathan Pillai; Dr. S Nirmala Devi

Vini Vishwa Lal is an Indian screenwriter who works in Malayalam cinema. Vini's debut movie was Second Show (2012) directed by Srinath Rajendran (debut) . Its also the first movie of Dulquer Salman, Sunny Wayne and Gauthami Nair in their acting career. His next film Koothara starring Mohan Lal, Tovino Thomas, Bharath and Sunny Wayne in the lead released in June 2014. In 2015 Starring Pournami a road trip movie starring Sunny Wayne and Tovino Thomas was penned by Vini. The film later dropped due to some budget issues. His latest movie Theevandi released on 7 September 2018, starring Tovino Thomas and Samyuktha Menon.

Vini also played acting roles in Malayalam movies, first in Ladoo followed by Theevandi and Kalki.

== Personal life ==
Vini Vishwa Lal was born in Pathanamthitta district, Kerala on 25 May 1985. He is the eldest child of G Viswanathan Pillai, (Retd) District Transport Officer at Kerala State Road Transport Corporation and Dr. S Nirmala Devi, (Retd) Principal at Farook Training college - Kozhikode. He has a younger brother Nivi Viswa Lal, a film musician working for Malayalam film industry. Vini grew up in Feroke, where he did schooling at Al-Farook residential school in Feroke, kozhikode. He later studied in CUIET - Calicut University Institute of Engineering and Technology and graduated in Electronics and Communication Engineering. Where he was classmate of Srinath Rajendran - Malayalam movie director and Sunny Wayne - Malayalam movie actor who was his senior.

== Filmography ==
=== Writer ===
Year	Film	Cast	Notes
2012	Second Show	Dulquer Salmaan, Sunny Wayne, Gauthami Nair	Debut film
2014	Koothara	Mohan Lal, Tovino Thomas, Bharath, Sunny Wayne	
2015	Starring Pournami	Sunny Wayne, Tovino Thomas	Not released
2018	Theevandi	Tovino Thomas, Samyuktha Menon	

=== Actor ===
No.	Year	Film	Role	Released On
1	2018	Ladoo	Alex Eepan & Pulimala Sugunan	17 November 2018
2	2018	Theevandi	Shanavas Sir	7 September 2018
3	2019	Kalki	Appu Nanchagotta	8 August 2019
4	2020	Vrittham	Ashok Viswanath	Unreleased Film

=== Others ===
No.	Year	Film	Role	Notes
1	2021	Kurup (film)	Creative director	
