= Starring Pournami =

- Directed by: Alby
- Written by: Vini Vishwa Lal
- Produced by: Shahul Hameed Marikkar
- Starring: Sunny Wayne; Tovino Thomas
- Cinematography: Sinu Siddarth
- Music by: Kailas Menon
- Country: India
- Language: Malayalam

Starring Pournami is an unreleased Malayalam road movie directed by Albey, starring Sunny Wayne, Tovino Thomas and Aju Varghese in the lead roles. The film was shot in seven states of India. The first schedule started in New Delhi and finished in Manali. Second schedule was done in Ladak. The film was later dropped due to some budget issues.
