= Aneesh Gopal =

Indian film actor

- Born: Aneesh Pilathottathil; Cheekkode, Malappuram, Kerala
- Years active: 2012–present
- Notable work: Second Show; Theevandi; Bhramam

Aneesh Pilathottathil better known as Aneesh Gopal is an Indian actor and graphic designer known for his works primarily in malayalam films. He made his debut with Second Show in 2012.

== Personal life ==
Aneesh Gopal was born in Cheekkode village, Malappuram, Kerala. Aneesh came to Malayalam cinema through film poster designing. Aneesh made his Malayalam film debut in 2012 with Srinath Rajendran's Second Show.

== Filmography ==
†	Denotes films that have not yet been released

=== As actor ===
Year	Title	Role(s)	Notes
2012	Second Show	Vikadan	
2014	Koothara	College Student	
2015	Ennu Ninte Moideen		
2018	Kaly	Richie	
2018	Idiyan Kartha	Sudhish	Short film
2018	Kamuki	Snehithan	
2018	Theevandi	Saffer	
2018	Adi Idi Vedi (Short film)	Ubaid	
2018	Ladoo	Drunkard	
2019	Argentina Fans Kaattoorkadavu	Suni	
2019	Jeem Boom Bhaa	Kuko	
2019	Maarconi Mathaai	Afzal	
2019	Janamaithri	Rafael's Brother	
2019	Kalki	Shashankan	
2020	Karnan Napoleon Bhagat Singh		
2020	Chiri		
2021	Nizhal	Police who spies John Baby	
2021	Bhramam	Lopez	
2022	Thattassery Koottam	Kalesh	
2023	Nadhikalil Sundari Yamuna	Chandran	
2024	Partners		
2024	Ajayante Randam Moshanam	Chegu Babu	
2024	Oru Anweshanathinte Thudakkam		
2025	Identity		
2026	Vivaah		
2026	Paathira Kurukkan †	TBA	
