= Filmfare Award for Best Music Director – Malayalam =

Indian annual film award

- Awarded for: Best Music Director in Malayalam Films
- Country: India
- Presented by: Filmfare
- First award: Raveendran for His Highness Abdullah (1990)
- Currently held by: Sushin Shyam for Aavesham (2024)

The Filmfare Award for Best Music Director – Malayalam is given by the Filmfare magazine as part of its annual Filmfare Awards South for Malayalam films.

== Superlatives ==
Superlative	Music Director	Record
Most awards	Vidyasagar	5
Most awards	M. Jayachandran	5
Second most awards	Raveendran	4
Third most awards	Ravi	2
Third most awards	Ilaiyaraaja	2
Third most awards	Gopi Sundar	2
Third most awards	Kailas Menon	2

== Winners ==
Here is a list of the award winners and the films they won for.

Year	Music Director	Film	Ref
2024	Sushin Shyam	Aavesham
2023	Sam C. S.	RDX
2022	Kailas Menon	Vaashi
2020–2021	M. Jayachandran	Sufiyum Sujatayum
2019	AWARDS FUNCTION WAS SUSPENDED DUE TO COVID-19 PANDEMIC
2018	Kailas Menon	Theevandi
2017	Rex Vijayan	Mayaanadhi
2016	Bijibal	Maheshinte Prathikaaram
2015	M. Jayachandran	Ennu Ninte Moideen
2014	Gopi Sundar	Bangalore Days
2013	M. Jayachandran	Celluloid
2012	Vidyasagar	Diamond Necklace
2011	M. Jayachandran	Pranayam
2010	Gopi Sundar	Anwar
2009	Vidyasagar	Neelathaamara
2008	Sharreth	Thirakkatha
2007	Ouseppachan	Ore Kadal
2006	Raveendran	Vadakkumnadhan
2005	Ilaiyaraaja	Achuvinte Amma
2004	M. Jayachandran	Perumazhakkalam
2003	Ilaiyaraaja	Manassinakkare
2002	Vidyasagar	Meesa Madhavan
2001	Suresh Peters	Raavanaprabhu
2000	Mohan Sithara	Joker
1999	Vidyasagar	Niram
1998	Vidyasagar	Summer in Bethlehem
1997	Kaithapram Damodaran Namboothiri	Kaliyattam
1996	Kaithapram Damodaran Namboothiri	Desadanam
1995	Raveendran	Mazhayethum Munpe
1994	Ravi	Parinayam
1993	S. P. Venkatesh	Paithrukam
1992	Ravi	Sargam
1991	Raveendran	Bharatham
1990	Raveendran	His Highness Abdullah
