= Pappu (cinematographer) =

Indian cinematographer (1977/1978 – 2022)

- Born: Sudheesh Pappu; 1977 or 1978; Cochin, Kerala, India
- Died: 14 November 2022 (aged 44); Eranakulam, Kerala, India
- Occupation: Cinematographer
- Years active: 2000–2022

Sudheesh Pappu (1977/1978 – 14 November 2022), professionally credited mononymously as Pappu, was an Indian cinematographer who worked in Malayalam cinema.

== Early life ==
Pappu was born in Thrippunithura, Ernakulam, Kerala. He was schooled in Kendriya Vidyalaya, Ernakulam.

== Career ==
Pappu began his career by assisting cinematographer Rajeev Ravi in films such as Chandni Bar (2001), Sesham (2002) and Dev.D (2009), and subsequently made his debut as an independent cinematographer with the Malayalam crime film Second Show in 2012. From then, Pappu worked in a number of Malayalam films, including the mystery thriller Koothara (2014), Ayaal Sassi, Rose Guitarinaal, Njan Steve Lopez (2014) and the romantic drama Eeda (2018).

== Death ==
Pappu died at Ernakulam on 14 November 2022, at the age of 44. He was suffering from Amyloidosis and was on treatment for some time. He was hospitalised during the filming of Appan.

== Filmography ==
As cinematographer
Year	Film	Director
2012	Second Show	Srinath Rajendran
2013	Rose Guitarinaal	Ranjan Pramod
2014	Njan Steve Lopez	Rajeev Ravi
2014	Koothara	Srinath Rajendran
2017	Ayaal Sassi	Sajin Babu
2018	Eeda	B. Ajithkumar
2022	Appan	Maju

As 2nd unit cinematographer
Year	Film	Director
2011	Annayum Rasoolum	Rajeev Ravi
2016	Kammatipaadam	Rajeev Ravi
2020	Thuramukham	Rajeev Ravi

As assistant cinematographer
Year	Film	Director
2001	Chandni Bar	Madhur Bhandarkar
2002	Sesham	T. K. Rajeev Kumar
2007	Dev.D	Anurag Kashyap

As chief associate cinematographer
Year	Film	Director
2004	Black	Renjith
2005	Classmates	Laljose
