= Kanakarajyam =

2024 Indian film

- Directed by: Sagar Hari
- Written by: Sagar Hari
- Produced by: Ajith Vinayaka
- Starring: Indrans; Murali Gopy
- Cinematography: Abhilash Shankar
- Edited by: Ajeesh Anand
- Music by: Arun Muraleedharan
- Production company: Ajith Vinayaka Films
- Distributed by: Ajith Vinayaka Release
- Release date: 5 July 2024
- Running time: 125 minutes
- Country: India
- Language: Malayalam

Kanakarajyam is a 2024 Indian Malayalam-language family-drama film written and directed by Sagar Hari. It stars Indrans, Murali Gopy and Leona Lishoy. It was produced by Wichu Ajith Vinayaka under the banner of Ajith Vinayaka Films Pvt Ltd and the music was composed by Arun Muraleedharan. It was released on 5 July 2024.

== Plot ==
Ramanandhan, a former Indian military soldier, works as a security guard at a jewelry store. He is about to be celebrated by his recruitment agency for his dedication to his job. Venu is in debt and is forced to pay for his sister-in-law's engagement. The two men's lives become intertwined when they get into an issue. The film explores the complexities of their relationship, including their pride and complexes.

== Cast ==
- Indrans as Ramanandhan
- Murali Gopy as Venu
- Leona Lishoy as Venu's wife
- Rajesh Sharma ad Thothiyannan
- Dinesh Prabhakar as Circle Inspector
- Athira Patel as Ramanadhan's daughter

== Music ==
Arun Muraleedharan composed the music.and B.K.Harinarayanan,Manu Manjith,Dhanya Suresh Menon and Rahul R. Sarma wrote the lyrics.
