= Erida (film) =

2021 film by V. K. Prakash

- Official release poster
- Directed by: V. K. Prakash
- Written by: YV Rajesh
- Based on: Eris (mythology) the Greek goddess of conflict and discord
- Produced by: Aji Medayil; Aroma Babu
- Starring: Samyuktha; Nassar; Kishore; Dharmajan Bolgatty; Hareesh Peradi
- Cinematography: Loganathan Srinivasan
- Edited by: Suresh Urs
- Music by: Abhijith Shylanath
- Production companies: Aroma Cinemas and Good Company; Trends Ad Film Makers Pvt Ltd.
- Distributed by: Amazon Prime Video
- Release date: 28 October 2021
- Running time: 124 minutes
- Country: India
- Languages: Malayalam; Tamil

Erida is a 2021 Indian crime drama film directed by V. K. Prakash. Simultaneously shot in Malayalam and Tamil, the film stars Samyuktha in the titular role with Nassar, Kishore, Hareesh Peradi and Dharmajan Bolgatty in pivotal roles. The film was produced by Aji Medayil and Aroma Babu under the banner of Aroma Cinemas and Good Company in association with Prakash's Trends Ad Film Makers Pvt Ltd.

Erida is a reference to Eris, the Greek goddess of conflict and discord.

Erida released through the OTT service Amazon Prime Video on 28 October 2021.

== Plot ==
In a high-stakes poker game, a wealthy married man offers his attractive wife as a bet. Little does he know that his actions call for a menacing game of deception, hate, and murder.

== Cast ==
- Samyuktha as Anu
- Nassar as Shankar Ganesh
- Kishore as Mathivanan
- Hareesh Peradi as Vijay Menon / Vijay Maaran
- Harish Raj as Inspector Sundar
- Dharmajan Bolgatty as Servant
- Nizhagal Ravi as Uncle
- Y. V. Rajesh as Rajesh
- Jolly Bastin as Vincent
- Sanjay Pal as Sanjay
- Sneha Nambiar as Shankar's wife

== Production ==
The film took 55 days to shoot in Bangalore in 2020 while adhering to COVID-19 safety guidelines. The first-look poster of the film was released on October 1, 2020. The cinematography of the film was by Loganathan Srinivasan, and the editing was handled by Suresh Urs.

== Music ==
The music for the film was composed by Abhijith Shylanath.

== Reception ==
A critic from The Times of India wrote that "While somewhere in the film is the seed of what could have been a fairly engaging film noir, the story just progresses with many flaws". A critic from OTTplay wrote that "With only a handful of engaging sequences, the movie which has nothing new to offer is a tiresome watch".
