= Second Show =

- Theatrical release poster
- Directed by: Srinath Rajendran
- Written by: Vini Vishwa Lal
- Produced by: AOPL Entertainment Private Limited
- Starring: Dulquer Salmaan; Sunny Wayne; Gauthami Nair; Rohini; Sudesh Berry; Baburaj
- Cinematography: Pappu
- Edited by: Praveen K. L. N. B. Srikanth
- Music by: Nikhil Rajan; Avial
- Production company: AOPL Entertainment Private Limited
- Distributed by: AOPL Entertainment Private Limited (Kerala); Fox Star Studios (rest of India and abroad)
- Release date: 3 February 2012 (India)
- Running time: 126 minutes
- Country: India
- Language: Malayalam

Second Show is a 2012 Indian Malayalam-language neo-noir action thriller film directed by debutante Srinath Rajendran and written by debutante Vini Vishwa Lal. The film, set in the backdrop of criminal gangs of varied varieties in Kerala, tells the story of Harilal alias Lalu who rises from an illicit sand miner to a smuggling baron in a short time. It stars Dulquer Salmaan, Sunny Wayne and Gauthami Nair with a supporting cast such as Rohini, Baburaj and Sudesh Berry. The film marks the acting debuts of Dulquer Salmaan, son of Malayalam actor Mammootty, Sunny Wayne and Gauthami Nair.

== Plot ==
The film proceeds as the flashback of an ex-convict Harilal narrated to a man he meets at a bus stop on a rainy night. It is revealed that Harilal (whose nickname is Lalu) is a poor young man who works for the local sand mafia as a driver. He is friends with Kurudi, whose real name is Nelson Mandela PP. One day while at work, Kurudi draws Lalu to a fight leaving the sand smugglers without a driver that causes them to get caught by the police. Now jobless, Lalu and Kurudi join the group of Chaver Vavachan, who is a financier, and take up the job of retrieving vehicles for non-repayment of loans.

Chaver Vavachan is the younger brother of a notorious former goon 'Chaver Antony' who dies due to a cracker burst by a young lad. Vavachan swears revenge and, after a wait of long 25 years, Vavachan finds the lad (who is now a man) at a hospital and tries to kill him by taking off his oxygen support. Just then, a nurse enters and tries to prevent vavachan from doing it, but she is pushed out. She tries to enter again, but Lalu blocks the way. Angered, the nurse slaps him. Next, she is shown lying on a stretcher, unconscious and having three red lines on her cheek, which reveals that Lalu had given her a tight slap in return. Vavachan completes his revenge by bursting crackers on that man. But unfortunately, he killed one of the henchmen of Vishnu Budhan, an influential smuggler. As revenge, Vishnu Budhan kills Vavachan. Vishnu Budhan's henchmen try to kill Vavachan's men (including Lalu and Kurudi). Lalu and his friends come to know about Vavachan's death and try to flee, but Lalu fears Vishnu Budhan's henchmen might come to his house and harm his mother. So, he leaves his mother at his uncle Janardhan's house. He lies to his mom and uncle that he is the manager at Sastha finance. Janardhan makes Lalu meet the latter's cousin Geetanjali alias Geethu, who was the nurse he had slapped earlier that day. He threatens her not to reveal anything about the hospital incident to his mother. Lalu and Kurudi leave and reach a spot where they meet their friends, but they are confronted by Vishnu Budhan's henchmen, who attacks them. Lalu fights against them. Impressed by his courage, Vishnu Budhan takes Lalu into his gang. During one of Vishnu Budhan's deals, Lalu is betrayed by Vikadan, one of his friends and Vishnu Budhan mistakes Lalu for making away with the goods. Vishnu Budhan's son and friends severely thrash Lalu. When he is admitted in a hospital by his friends, one of his friends receives a call from Sachi, one of Buchan's henchmen and a constable of police. He is forced to move away. After riding far long, he and his friends reaches in his another friend Sethu's house. There he lives with his friends by owning a tea shop. On the next day, his friend Kurudi, who got a job as a taxi driver, comes wired differently than before. He says to others that he met with Bhuddhan's son and beaten him and also that all are his, including his phone. They receive a call from Bhuddhan thinking that it is his son itself and says a load is coming on his way. From here, Lalu and his friends start to fight against Bhudhan. In between, Lalu proposes to Geethu, but she denies it, saying that she cannot fall in love with a goon. But Lalu's uncle was planning to have Geethu married to Lalu. Finally, Geethu accepts his proposal. Lalu, however, returns as a smuggler in his own right and starts overshadowing Vishnu Budhan. Angered by this, Vishnu Budhan kills Kurudi, and Lalu avenges his death by killing Vishnu Budhan and taking over his business. One day, his friend Sachi comes to meet him and tells Lalu to meet the new Commissioner of Police. When Lalu sees him, he learns that Sachi is the Commissioner of Police. Eventually, he is jailed. Lalu loses everything except his mother, who still had faith and love on him. Geethu married some other man. He also lost his business.

Back in the present, as Lalu finishes his narration, he says that he was released that day and was returning home. At that time, he sees a suspicious car parked nearby. Realising it is a trap, Lalu becomes alert, but the man to whom Lalu had just narrated his story shoots him. Before leaving, the man reveals that he was actually sent by Vishnu Bhudhan's son to kill Lalu. The final scene shows Lalu lying badly wounded, but his hand moves slightly, revealing that his chapter is not yet over.

== Cast ==
- Dulquer Salmaan as Hari Lal "Lalu"
- Sunny Wayne as Nelson Mandela "Kurudi"
- Gauthami Nair as Geethanjali "Geethu" Janardanan
- Baburaj in a dual role as:
  - Chaver Anthony
  - Chaver Vavachan
- Rohini as Devaki, Lalu's mother and Janardanan's sister
- Sudesh Berry as Vishnu Budhan
- Kunjan as Janardanan, Lalu's uncle and Geethu's father
- Mithun Nair as Sidharth Budhan, Vishnu Budhan's son
- Bibin Perumbillikunnel as Abu
- Anil Anto as Neerali
- Murali Krishnan as Sethu
- Ratheesh as Ummar
- Aneesh Gopal as Vikadan
- Baiju Varghese as Babu
- Sam as Sunil
- Vijay Kumar as Sachin R. Menon IPS (Sachi)
- Noora Michael as Surabhi
- Sundar as Abhi
- Joby as Kochu
- Sreekumar Kozhikode as SI George
- Robin Wilson as Kuttu
- Jayaraj Kozhikode as Ramettan
- Kottayam Bose as Moopan
- Dominin as Interview
- Bibin as Sajan George
- Sidhu R. Pillai as Shyam

== Production ==
Dulquer Salman made his debut in films through Second Show. Dulquer starred alongside debutantes Gauthami Nair, Sunny Wayne and debutant director Sreenath Rajendran. Debutant Vini Vishwa Lal has penned the screenplay and dialogue. Pappu's first film, as independent cinematographer. Sakhi Thomas was the costume designer. AOPL International Pvt Ltd produced the film. Kaithapram has handled the music. Avial band also contributed with a musical number. Baburaj alongside others appeared in supporting roles. The Project was designed by Shaz Shabeer Strikers & Crew.

== Music ==
All lyrics are written by Engandiyur Chandrashekaran; all music is composed by Avial and Nikhil Rajan.

No.	Title	Artist(s)	Length
1.	"Adipidi"	Nikhil Rajan	3:30
2.	"Ee Ramayana"	Sooraj Santhosh, Janani Madhan	4:19
3.	"Ee Ramayana"	Janani Madhan	4:19
4.	"Ayyo"	Avial	4:27
5.	"Thithithara"	Avial	3:29
6.	"Arambath"	Avial	4:22
7.	"Swapnam"	Naresh Iyer	4:43
8.	"Swapnam"	Jakes Bejoy	4:43

== Reception ==
The film was a commercial success. Nowrunning rated the film 2.5 out of 5 and said, "Srinath Rajendran's film does have a head-spinning quality to it that leaves you dazed at times, but remains entertaining and witty to the hilt". IndiaGlitz rated the movie 6.5 out of 10 by saying "Overall, Second show though with its share of little negatives, is an honest effort that deserves to be encouraged". Rediff.com gave the film a rating of 2 out of 5 stars and said the movie was disappointing. Sify in its review said that "It is Dulquer's amazing screen presence and a matured acting style that makes the movie an engaging watch." concluding "Ultimately, it's an above average film, at best time-pass viewing. Watch it with no expectations and if you're ready to think unconventional, this film could be a nice option."
