= Kalki (2019 Malayalam film) =

2019 Indian film by Praveen Prabharam

- Theatrical release poster
- Directed by: Praveen Prabharam
- Written by: Praveen Prabharam; Sujin Sujathan
- Produced by: Suvin K.Varkey; Prashob Krishna
- Starring: Tovino Thomas; Samyuktha
- Cinematography: Gautham Sankar
- Edited by: Ranjith Koozhoor
- Music by: Jakes Bejoy
- Production company: Little Big Films
- Distributed by: Central Pictures
- Release date: 8 August 2019
- Running time: 145 minutes
- Country: India
- Language: Malayalam

Kalki is a 2019 Indian Malayalam-language action crime film directed by Praveen Prabharam (in his directorial debut) and produced by Little Big Films. The film stars Tovino Thomas, alongside Shivajith, Samyuktha and Vini Vishwa Lal. The music was composed by Jakes Bejoy, while the cinematography and editing were handled by Gautham Sankar and Ranjith Koozhoor respectively.

Kalki was released to 8 August 2019 and received mixed reviews from critics.

== Plot ==
Nanchenkotta, a fictional place on the Kerala-Tamil Nadu border, is ruled by Amarnath, the leader of DYP, a political party. Amarnath threatens and tortures the people to keep them under control, which leads many residents to relocate to neighbouring places. Nenchenkotta is filled with goons under Amarnath's command and DYP is also involved in illegal businesses like gun production. The other known members of the party are Amarnath's brother Appu and their cousin Dr. Sangeetha. Another rival party headed by Adv. Lakshmanan participates in election, but to no avail because of Amarnath's influence. Adv. Lakshmanan gives a speech about going against DYP and asks for the vote of the local people, but Lakshmanan is killed by Amarnath's henchman Ummar.

Even though there is a police station, the law is in Amarnath's pocket and the cops are unable to take any action against him. SI Vyshakan, the in-charge of Nanchenkotta, commits suicide after his daughter criticises him for his inability to take action in Lakshmanan's case. The new leader of the rival party and his subordinates start taking their own decisions without thinking about the people. They conduct a meeting to select the candidate for the upcoming election against DYP's candidate Appu. The new decisions are not well received and Sooraj, a senior party member, and several members leave the party to work for the people on their own. The same day, the new leader hires a goon to finish Amarnath, but he ends up getting killed by Amarnath.

Meanwhile, an SI (simply referred as "K") arrives at Nanchenkotta and burns a goon alive as he had taken over the police station. K rallies the other cops and starts clearing Amarnath's goons using illegal methods. K visits the illegal gun manufacturing site headed by Appu and threatens him to shut it down. In response, Ummar arrives at the police station and threatens K, but K orders Ummar not to work under Amarnath. On Amarnath's direction, Ummar tries to make K leave the town or kill him, but to no avail. In a final attempt, Ummar attacks two policemen and one loses his leg in the process.

An agitated K tracks down Ummar in a factory and thrashes him and his allies, where he chops off Ummar's legs with a chainsaw. Sooraj meets K and requests his help to convince the people to return to Nanchenkotta. K starts working for the people against DYP, enraging Amarnath. Amarnath's goons kill a policeman and stabs K, but K manages to defeat them. In the next step, Amarnath finishes Sooraj, which impacts the confidence of the locals. K kidnaps Appu, thrashes him so severely that he falls into a coma. Amarnath is forced to kill Appu to end his suffering and swears to exact revenge against K.

Sangeetha refuses to become the next candidate and leaves for Hyderabad after a cop threatens her. Amarnath asks K to arrive for a final battle. In the subsequent fight, K defeats Amarnath and drags Amarnath's body through the streets, where he orders no one to move until the prison authorities arrive. The people, who had left arrive and walk over Amarnath's unconscious body, thus establishing peace in Nanchenkotta. K secretly leaves Nenchenkotta and arrives at an unknown place in Tamil Nadu to restore peace and order.

== Cast ==
- Tovino Thomas as SI Kalki [short name as k]
- Shivajith as Amarnath
- Sudheesh as HC Abdullah
- James Elia as ASI Kuttan Pillai
- Samyuktha as Dr. Sangeetha
- Dheeraj Denny as Constable Govind
- Siyad Yadhu as Constable Biju
- KPAC Lalitha as Lalithabhai
- Jojo Cyriac George as Manali Sabu
- Vini Vishwa Lal as Appu
- Saiju Kurup as Sooraj
- Siddique as Mohanan
- Aparna Nair as Aavani
- Aneesh Gopal as Shashankan
- Irshad as SI Vaishakhan
- Anjali Nair as Vaishakan's Wife
- Kritika Pradeep as Swapna
- Jilu Joseph as Abdullah's wife
- Anand Bal as Adv. Lakshmanan
- Nazir Mubarak as Jijo

== Production ==
Kalki was announced by Tovino Thomas on 16 September 2018 through his Facebook page. The film is produced by Suvin K. Varkey and Prasobh Krishna under their production house Little Big Films. The first-look poster of the film was also released during the film announcement. Tovino Thomas is portraying the lead role as a police officer, and Samyuktha Menon is playing the female lead. Saiju Kurup playing a supporting role.Principal photography began on 12 March 2019 with a customary pooja function held at Kochi. Filming took place at Tenkasi, Tamilnadu and Kundara, Kerala. The shooting was completed on 29 May 2019 in a single schedule with 62 days of filming.

== Music ==
Kalki

Soundtrack album by Jakes Bejoy
- Released: 16 August 2019
- Recorded: 2018–19
- Studios: Mindscore Studio, Chennai
- Genre: Feature film soundtrack
- Length: 14:58
- Language: Malayalam
- Label: Goodwill Music

Jakes Bejoy chronology
Kakshi: Amminippilla (2019)	Kalki (2019)	Porinju Mariam Jose (2019)

The music of the film was composed by Jakes Bejoy. The audio rights were acquired by Goodwill Music.

Track listing
No.	Title	Lyrics	Singer(s)	Length
1.	"K Swag – Red Blue Black"	Joe Paul, Fejo	Jakes Bejoy, Niranj Suresh, Ajaey Shravan, Saint TFC, Kesav Vinod	4:09
2.	"Kalki – Cop – Theme Music"	Instrumental	Instrumental	1:30
3.	"Nenje"	Mani Amuthavan	Ananthu	4:49
4.	"Vidavangi"	Manu Manjith	Harisankar, Sithara Krishnakumar, Alan Joy Mathew	4:30
Total length:				14:58

=== Background score ===
The background score was released on 30 January 2020.

No.	Title	Length
1.	"Kalki – Intro"	1:56
2.	"Kalki – Cop Theme"	1:30
3.	"Karmadha Asura"	1:42
4.	"Dhol Theme"	1:32
5.	"Villain Theme"	1:00
6.	"Sangeetha Theme"	0:53
7.	"Ummer Theme"	0:46
8.	"Nanjankotta Today"	1:40
9.	"Lost Home"	1:52
10.	"Kalki – Theme Revisited" (Ft. Jos Jossey)	1:16
Total length:		14:14

== Release ==
=== Theatrical ===
Kalki was released worldwide on 8 August 2019.

=== Home media ===
The satellite and digital rights of the film were sold to Zee Keralam and ZEE5.

== Reception ==
=== Critical response ===
Anjana George of The Times of India gave 3.5/5 stars and wrote “If you love to enjoy an adrenaline rush, Tovino’s looks and action sequences with blood, Kalki is for you.” Sify gave 3/5 stars and wrote "Kalki is an action flick that is a gripping ride for sure, especially if you have an idea about what you are going to see. It is a delightful Tovino Thomas show that is definitely worth a watch."

Litty Simon gave 3/5 stars and wrote Onmanorama and wrote "Though entertaining, Kalki did had the potential to be the best provided it was made more engaging." Akhila Menon of Filmibeat gave 2.5/5 stars and wrote "Kalki will surely entertain audiences, who are into mass-action entertainers. This movie is a watchable flick, which has its own strengths and flaws."

S. R. Praveen of The Hindu wrote "Kalki wears its philosophy, belonging to the medieval ages, on its sleeve for much of its duration." Vidya Nair from Deccan Chronicle wrote "The larger-than-life portrayal of action has made Kalki an entertaining and one of the fine movies of this year."
