= Appan (film) =

- Official Film Poster
- അപ്പൻ
- Directed by: Maju
- Written by: Maju; R Jayakumar
- Produced by: Josekutty Madathil; Ranjith Manambarakkat
- Starring: Sunny Wayne; Ananya; Alencier Ley Lopez; Grace Antony; Pauly Valsan; Geethi Sangeetha
- Cinematography: Pappu; Vinod Illampally
- Edited by: Kiran Das
- Music by: Dawn Vincent
- Production company: Tiny Hands Productions
- Distributed by: SonyLIV
- Release date: 28 October 2022
- Running time: 129 minutes
- Country: India
- Language: Malayalam

Appan (transl. Father) is a 2022 Indian Malayalam-language tragedy-drama film co-written and directed by Maju and jointly produced by Josekutty Madathil and Ranjith Manambarakkat under the banners of Sunny Wayne Productions and Tiny Hands Productions. The film stars Wayne as a rubber tapper, with Ananya, Alencier Ley Lopez, Grace Antony, and Pauly Valsan featuring in major supporting roles. The cinematography was done by Pappu, the editing by Kiran Das, and the musical composition by Dawn Vincent.

== Plot ==
Njoonju, a rubber tapper, lives with his father, mother, wife, and son in a small village.

Ittychan, his father, is bedridden, but has always been and continues to be narcissistic, cruel, and a womaniser despite his condition. He harasses, abuses, and tortures his wife, Kuttyamma, and Njoonju. All his family members wait longingly for his death. Many villagers who had bitter experiences with his behavior in the past even make plans to kill him.

Ittychan manipulates his family members to bring their next-door neighbour and prostitute, Sheela, to live with him and take care of him. Though initially the family and Sheela were at loggerheads, both parties warm up to each other as the family sees Sheela as a good-natured woman who ended up in this situation due to her circumstances (later, they understand Ittychan had killed Sheela's father to own her and then dragged her to their hometown resulting in her having to fend for herself through prostitution), and Sheela sees that unlike Ittychan his family are good people.

Noonju makes a plan to leave the village but can't force himself to let go of his duties as a son. Meanwhile, Ittychan's friend dies committing suicide after listening to the news that a man named Kuriakose has been released from Jail.

On a Christmas evening, Kuriakose, whose wife was raped and killed by Ittychan, comes to their house to kill him. Njoonju tries to protect his father. While Njoonju and Kuriakose are fighting, Ittychan asks Kuriakose to kill Njoonju, take the woman, and in return, give him back his life. Sheela gets furious at his words and stabs Ittychan to death. Kuriakose leaves the house. Njoonju and his family inform the neighborhood that Ittychan died from a mild attack. It is indicated that Njoonju's family and Sheela together live peacefully in that home after that.

== Cast ==
- Sunny Wayne as Njoonju
- Alencier Ley Lopez as Ittychan, Njoonju's father
- Pauly Valsan as Kuttyamma, Ittychan's wife
- Ananya as Rosy, Njoonju's wife
- Grace Antony as Molykutty, Njoonju's younger sister
- Vijilesh Karayad as Boban, Molykutty's husband
- Radhika Radhakrishnan as Sheela
- Anil K. Sivaram as Varghese, Ittychan's friend
- Drupad Krishna as Abel, Njoonju's son
- Geethi Sangeetha as Latha, a neighbour
- Unni Raja as Suku
- Shamsudheen Makarathodi as Jhonson
- Ashraf as Kuriako

== Filming ==
The film began principal photography in September 2021 at Thodupuzha in Kerala, where it was extensively shot. The shoot was completed in 50 days.

== Release ==
Initially, the film was planned to be released in theatres. Later, it was released through the SonyLIV platform on 27 October 2022.

== Awards ==
- Kerala Film Critics Association Award for Best Supporting Actor: Alencier Ley Lopez
- Kerala State Film Awards for Special Mention: Alencier Ley Lopez
- Filmfare Critics Award for Best Actor – Malayalam: Alencier Ley Lopez
