= Vivaah (film) =

2026 Indian Malayalam-language drama

- Theatrical release poster
- Directed by: Blesson Elssa
- Written by: Abhishek Sreekumar
- Produced by: Selvam Ponnaiyan
- Starring: Dhyan Sreenivasan; Abhishek Sreekumar; Dhruvan; Nayana Elza; Aneesh Gopal; Sruthy Jayan; Naira Nihar; Archana Vivek
- Cinematography: Rony Sasidharan
- Edited by: Sheril
- Music by: Arun Muraleedharan
- Production company: Selrin Productions
- Release date: 7 August 2026 (Kerala)
- Running time: 101 minutes
- Country: India
- Language: Malayalam

Vivaah is a 2026 Indian Malayalam-language family drama romance film directed by Blesson Elssa and written by Abhishek Sreekumar. Produced by Selvam Ponnaiyan under the banner of Selrin Productions, the film stars Dhyan Sreenivasan, Dhruvan, Abhishek Sreekumar, and Aneesh Gopal in the lead roles, alongside an ensemble female cast featuring Sruthi Jayan, Naira Nihar, Archana Vivek, and Nayana Elza.

== Plot ==
Vivaah explores the intricate lives of four married couples and their individual struggles to untangle the chaos created within their relationships. Each couple faces distinct challenges: one deals with severe personal restrictions, another is navigating a marriage built without mutual interest, and a third involves a woman who has romanticized her life only to end up with a workaholic husband. Seeking the kind of romance she dreams of after observing another happy couple, she embarks on a conquest to replicate it in her own life. The narrative primarily focuses on these four women and the complex societal and personal problems they face.

== Cast ==
- Dhyan Sreenivasan
- Abhishek Sreekumar
- Dhruvan
- Nayana Elza
- Aneesh Gopal
- Sruthy Jayan
- Naira Nihar
- Archana Vivek

== Production ==
=== Development ===
The project was officially announced as a smooth-paced family romantic drama centering around four women and their life struggles. The film is directed by Blesson Elssa and written by Abhishek Sreekumar, who also plays a prominent role in the movie. It is backed by producer Selvam Ponnaiyan under Selrin Productions. Shamlan serves as the creative director, while the technical crew includes Rony Sasidharan as the cinematographer, Sheril as the editor, and Aneesh Kollam as the art director.

== Music ==
The soundtrack and background score for Vivaah are composed by Arun Muraleedharan, with audio rights acquired by Saregama. The lyrical tracks feature contributions from lyricists Titto P. Thankachan, Rahul R. Sarma, King Orekh, and Unni Karthikeyan, and are brought to life by vocalists including Hanan Shah, Vishnu Krishnan, Anantha Gopan, Rithu Krishnan, Krishna Priya, and the composer himself.

The musical promotions featured notable singles such as "Kothiyalere," "Kaney Kandoney," "Thanal Viral," and the track "Mayathe," which was officially released on July 30, 2026. The album blends romantic melodies with situational themes that mirror the emotional journeys of the four couples in the film.

== Release ==
Vivaah is slated for a theatrical release in August 2026. The official teaser and trailer were released in mid-July 2026 by Saregama Malayalam, generating positive traction across social media platforms.
