= Edakkad Battalion 06 =

Indian Malayalam-language action film

- Theatrical release poster
- Directed by: Swapnesh K. Nair
- Written by: P. Balachandran
- Produced by: Shrikant Bhasi; Thomas Joseph Pattathanam; Jayant Mammen
- Starring: Tovino Thomas; Samyuktha; Rekha Harris; Joy Mathew; Sudheesh; Abu Salim
- Cinematography: Sinu Sidharth
- Edited by: Samjith Mohammed
- Music by: Kailas Menon
- Production companies: Carnival Motion Pictures; Ruby Films
- Distributed by: Carnival Cinemas
- Release date: 25 October 2019
- Running time: 122 minutes
- Country: India
- Language: Malayalam

Edakkad Battalion 06 is an Indian Malayalam-language action drama film directed by Swapnesh K. Nair (in his directorial debut), written by P.Balachandran, and produced by Shrikant Bhasi, Tomas Joseph Pattathanam and Jayant Mammen under the banner of Ruby Films. Starring an ensemble cast of Tovino Thomas, Samyuktha, Rekha Harris, Joy Mathew, Sudheesh and Abu Salim, the film is inspired by a true story. The filming began in May 2019.

The film was released on 25 October 2019 during Diwali.

== Synopsis ==
Shafeek's father wanted him to become a chef. He, however, chose to join the Indian Army instead. On his annual leave from work, as a young soldier, he must deal with his family, his bride to be and a gang involved in illegal activities.

== Cast ==
- Tovino Thomas as Captain Shafeeq Muhammad
- Samyuktha as Naina Fathima
- Shalu Rahim as Ashokan, Dineshan's Son
- Jitin Puthanchery as Prince
- Karthik Vishnu as Roopesh
- Shankar Induchoodan as Nanku
- P. Balachandran as Muhammad Kutti
- Rekha Harris as Surayya Muhammad ,Shafeeq's mother
- Santhosh Keezhattoor as Ummer, Shafeek's Brother in Law
- Divya Pillai as Sameera, Shafeek's Sister
- Sarasa Balussery as Thithummachi, Shafeek's Father's Sister
- Joy Mathew as Basheer, Naina Fathima Father
- Uma Nair as Seenath Basheer, Naina Fathima Mother
- Nirmal Palazhi as Shankaran
- Anjali Nair as Shankaran's Sister
- Ponnamma Babu as Shankaran's Mother
- Malavika Menon as Shalini, Shankaran's Sister
- Salim Kumar as Santhosh, School NCC Master
- Sudheesh as Police Constable Dineshan
- Dheeraj Denny
- Sibi K Thomas
- Jithin Premnath as Padmadalakshan Pillai
- Jeo Baby as Villager
- Abu Salim
- Saiju Kurup
- Sasi Kalinga

== Soundtrack ==
Edakkad Battalion 06

Soundtrack album by Kailas Menon
- Released: 28 September 2019
- Recorded: 2019
- Studios: Octaves Studio; K7 Studios
- Genre: Feature film soundtrack
- Language: Malayalam
- Label: Millennium Audios

The soundtrack was composed by Kailas Menon with lyrics written by B K Harinarayanan. For "Shehnai Song", the lyrics are by Manu Manjith.

Track list
No.	Title	Singer(s)	Length
1.	"Edakkad Battalion 06"	K. S. Harisankar, Nithya Mammen	4:55
2.	"Nee Himamazhayayi"	Nithya Mammen Singer, K. S. Harisankar	5:18
3.	"Shehnai Song"	Sithara Krishnakumar, Yazin Nizar	4:36

== Release ==
The film was released on 18 October 2019.

=== Reception ===
The Times of India rated the film 2.5 out of 5 and wrote, "Edakkad Battalion 06 comes as a widely stretched out tribute to the brave martyrs of the land. The gravity and effect of martyrdom plays out in the last 10 minutes of the movie, which is by far the only part that manages to incite an emotion." Sify gave 2.5 and wrote, "With an average script, the story meanders along without a definite direction for most parts here. Perhaps the whole effort was to take it to the climax where there is a wafer thin plot."

The New Indian Express gave 2 out of 5 and wrote, "barring two notably tense moments in the first half—a daring rescue operation (involving fire) and a fight scene (involving water)—Edakkad Battalion fails to make us feel anything in other segments."
