= Samyuktha (actress) =

Indian actress (born 1995)

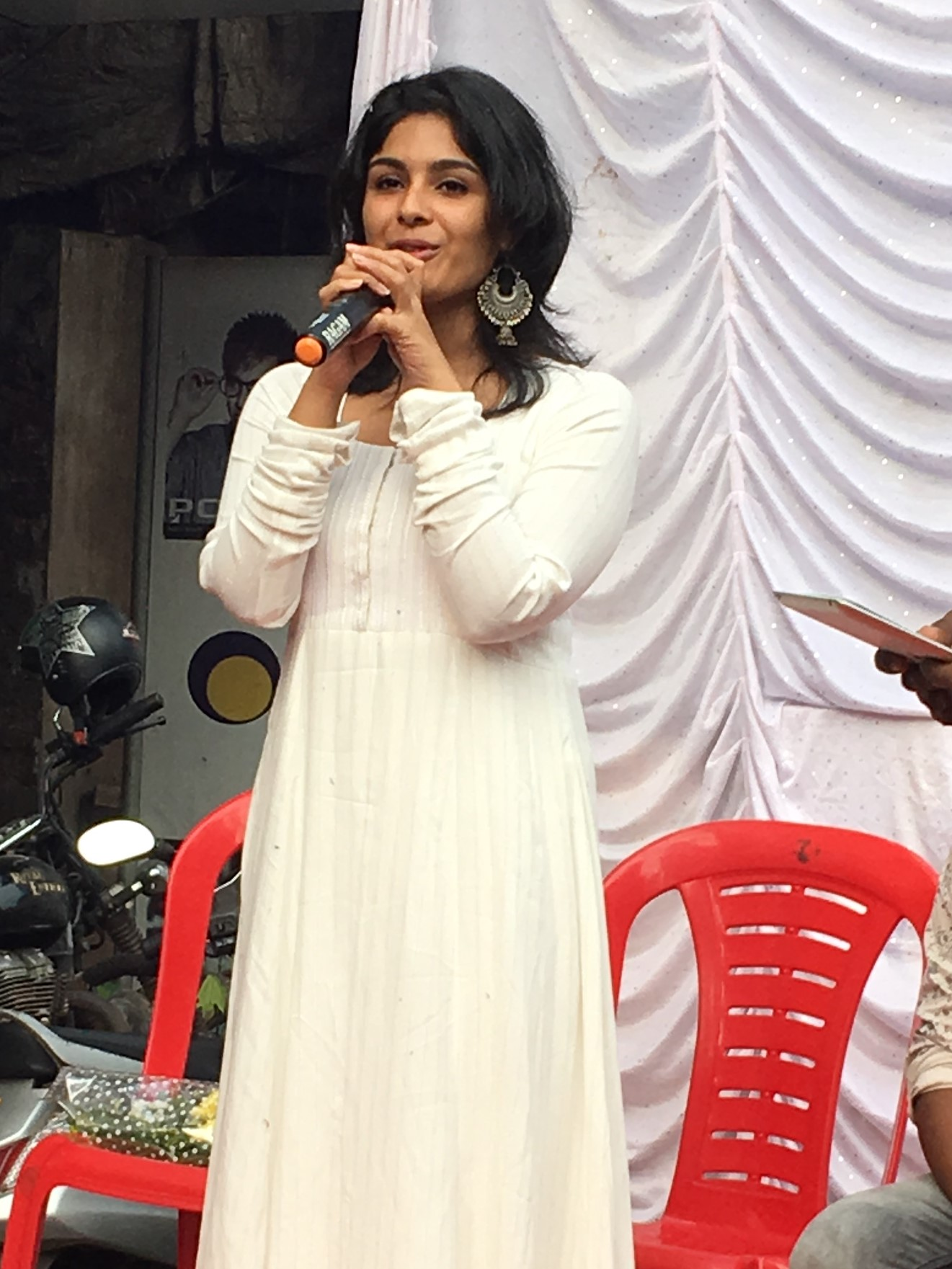
- Samyuktha in 2022
- Born: Samyuktha Menon; 11 September 1995 (age 31); Palakkad, Kerala, India
- Occupation: Actress
- Years active: 2016–present

Samyuktha (born Samyuktha Menon; 11 September 1995) is an Indian actress who predominantly appears in Telugu films and in a few Tamil and Malayalam films.

Samyuktha made her acting debut with the Malayalam film Popcorn (2016). She went on to appear in commercially successful films such as Kalki (2019), Edakkad Battalion 06 (2019), Bheemla Nayak (2022), Kaduva (2022), Bimbisara (2022), Gaalipata 2 (2022), Vaathi (2023), Virupaksha (2023) and Nari Nari Naduma Murari (2026).

== Early life ==
Samyuktha Menon was born on 11 September 1995, in Palakkad, Kerala, India. She completed her schooling from Chinmaya Vidyalaya, Thathamangalam and graduated a bachelors in economics.

== Career ==
=== Debut and early work (2016-2021) ===
Samyuktha made her acting debut in 2016 with the Malayalam film Popcorn, where she played the lead opposite Shine Tom Chacko. In 2018, she had two Malayalam film releases: Theevandi opposite Tovino Thomas and Lilli, where she played the titular role of a pregnant woman. Cris of The News Minute stated, "Samyuktha Menon is convincing as a pregnant woman, but her lines are flawed." That year, Samyuktha also made her Tamil film debut with Kalari opposite Krishna.

The year 2019 was a turning point in her career with six film releases. She first appeared in July Kaatril opposite Ananth Nag. She went on to appear in Oru Yamandan Premakadha opposite Dulquer Salmaan, in Uyare, and in Under World opposite Asif Ali. Samyuktha reunited with Tovino Thomas for her last two releases of the year, Kalki, where she played a doctor and Edakkad Battalion 06, where she played a teacher. For Kalki, Sify found her to be "decent" in her limited role. In 2021, Samyuktha worked in four films, Vellam opposite Jayasurya, the anthology Aanum Pennum, Wolf opposite Arjun Ashokan and Erida, where she played the titular role.

=== Expansion and commercial success (2022-present) ===
Samyuktha had four commercial successes in 2022. Her first release was, Bheemla Nayak, one of the highest grossing Telugu film of the year, opposite Rana Daggubati. She then appeared in one of the highest grossing Malayalam film of the year, Kaduva opposite Prithviraj Sukumaran. In Bimbisara, she played a police officer opposite Nandamuri Kalyan Ram. Later, she made her Kannada film debut with Gaalipata 2 opposite Diganth. A Sharadhaa of The New Indian Express stated that she justifies her character with her act.

In 2023, she first played a teacher opposite Dhanush in Vaathi, highest-grossing Tamil film of the year. She went onto appeared in Boomerang opposite Shine Tom Chacko, and in Devil: The British Secret Agent opposite Nandamuri Kalyan Ram. Neeshitha Nyayapati of Hindustan Times stated, "Samyuktha delivers a good performances for the most part. " Samyuktha then appeared opposite Sai Durgha Tej in Virupaksha. A commercial success, it was one of the highest grossing Telugu film of the year. Sangeetha Devi Dundoo of The Hindu noted, "Samyuktha has a good screen presence and makes it count in the later portions that demand something more from her."

In 2024, her only appearance was in the Telugu film Love Me. In 2025, she played a DRDO officer alongside Nandamuri Balakrishna in Akhanda 2: Thaandavam. T. Maruthi Acharya stated, "Samyuktha appears briefly but tries something different, even if the arc doesn’t fully click". The film failed at the box office. Samyuktha played a woman who is still not divorced from her ex-husband in the 2026 film Nari Nari Naduma Murari opposite Sharwanand. Srivathsan Nadadhur of The Hindu noted, "Samyuktha puts forth an assured, confident performance, bringing authenticity to the part." The film emerged a commercial success.

In the Kochi Times Most Desirable Women list, she was placed 7th both in 2018 and 2019, and 2nd in 2020.

== Personal life ==
In 2023, Samyuktha dropped her surname Menon from her name and said, "When I want to see equality, humanity and love all around, keeping a surname makes it very contradictory to what I want."

== Filmography ==
Key
†	Denotes films that have not yet been released

=== Films ===
Year	Title	Role	Language	Notes	Ref.
2016	Popcorn	Anjana	Malayalam		
2018	Theevandi	Devi	Malayalam		
2018	Lilli	Lilli	Malayalam		
2018	Kalari	Thenmozhi	Tamil		
2019	July Kaatril	Revathi	Tamil		
2019	Oru Yamandan Premakadha	Jesna Johny	Malayalam		
2019	Uyare	Tessa	Malayalam	Cameo appearance	
2019	Kalki	Dr. Sangeetha	Malayalam		
2019	Edakkad Battalion 06	Naina Fathima	Malayalam		
2019	Under World	Aishwarya	Malayalam		
2021	Vellam	Sunitha Murali	Malayalam		
2021	Aanum Pennum	Kochuparu / Savithri	Malayalam	Segment: "Savithri"	
2021	Wolf	Asha	Malayalam		
2021	Erida	Erida	Malayalam	Bilingual film	
2021	Erida	Erida	Tamil	Bilingual film	
2022	Bheemla Nayak	Kamali	Telugu		
2022	Kaduva	Elsa Kurian	Malayalam		
2022	Bimbisara	S.I Vyjayanthi	Telugu		
2022	Gaalipata 2	Anupama	Kannada		
2023	Vaathi	Meenakshi	Tamil	Bilingual film	
2023	Sir	Meenakshi	Telugu	Bilingual film	
2023	Boomerang	Honey Paul / Anjali	Malayalam		
2023	Virupaksha	Nandini Chalapathy	Telugu		
2023	Devil: The British Secret Agent	Nyshada	Telugu		
2024	Love Me	Divyavathi	Telugu	Cameo appearance	
2025	Akhanda 2: Thaandavam	Archana Goswami	Telugu		
2026	Nari Nari Naduma Murari	Dia Kakarla Arya	Telugu		
2027	Swayambhu †	TBA	Telugu	Filming	
2027	Maharagni: Queen of Queens †	Mohini	Hindi	Filming	
2027	Ram †	TBA	Malayalam	Filming	
2027	Benz †	TBA	Tamil	Filming	
2027	Slum Dog: 33 Temple Road †	TBA	Telugu	Filming	
2027	The Black Gold †	TBA	Telugu	Filming	

== Awards and nominations ==
Year	Award	Category	Work	Result	Ref.
2021	Kerala Film Critics Association Awards	Best Actress	Aanum Pennum, Vellam & Wolf	Won	
2023	South Indian International Movie Awards	Best Supporting Actress – Telugu	Bheemla Nayak	Nominated	
2024	South Indian International Movie Awards	Best Actress – Telugu	Virupaksha	Nominated	
2024	Santosham Film Awards	Best Actress	Virupaksha	Won	
