= Koothara =

- Directed by: Srinath Rajendran
- Written by: Vini Vishwa Lal
- Produced by: Shahul Hammeed Marikar
- Starring: Mohanlal; Bharath; Sunny Wayne; Tovino Thomas
- Narrated by: Dulquer Salmaan
- Cinematography: Pappu
- Edited by: N. B. Srikanth
- Music by: Gopi Sundar
- Production company: Marikar Films
- Distributed by: UTV Motion Pictures
- Release date: 13 June 2014
- Country: India
- Language: Malayalam

Koothara is a 2014 Indian Malayalam-language fantasy comedy-drama film directed by Srinath Rajendran and written by Vini Vishwa Lal. It stars Bharath, Sunny Wayne, and Tovino Thomas in the lead roles. Mohanlal makes an extended cameo appearance. The story, set in an untold period, focuses on three engineering students, Koobrin, Tharun, and Ram, and their adventures during college time and post-college life.

The original songs and background score were composed by Gopi Sundar. The film was released on 13 June 2014, and received mixed reviews from critics.

== Plot ==
Engineering students Koobrin, Tharun and Ram become close friends after meeting in college. Despite their different backgrounds, they share a carefree attitude toward life, frequently skip classes and perform poorly academically. Tharun faces pressure from his family to succeed as an engineer, Koobrin joined the course only after being promised a motorcycle by his father, and Ram, though wealthy, has little interest in engineering. After being expelled from their hostel, the three move in with their easy-going lecturer Chandran and his dog, Koothara.

During college, Ram falls in love with Shilpa, while Koobrin has several short-lived relationships. When Koobrin discovers that his girlfriend Sheistha has been unfaithful, the trio publicly confronts her during the college festival, leading to their expulsion from college without completing their degrees.

Struggling to find direction, Tharun returns to his family's painting business, Ram fails at several jobs, and Koobrin is sent to a seminary to train as a priest. Feeling like failures, they decide to start an information technology company called Yellowtooth. After secretly taking money from their families, they invest heavily in the venture despite having no business experience. The company quickly accumulates debt and most of its employees resign. During this period, they become friends with their neighbour Swathi, a single mother, although Tharun initially resents her young son over a previous incident.

After deciding to close Yellowtooth, the trio meet a mysterious fisherman in a bar who befriends them and claims to be a cursed merman. He encourages them to enter the fishing business and persuades them to purchase an old fishing boat from an elderly fisherman named Usthad Sali. With Swathi's assistance, they mortgage Shilpa's property to finance the purchase without inspecting the vessel.

They discover that the boat, nicknamed AK47 or Aale-kolli ("man-killer"), is old, badly damaged and believed to be haunted, with a reputation for causing numerous deaths at sea. The mysterious fisherman is revealed to be Usthad Sali himself, who deceived them into buying the boat for far more than its actual value.

Having no alternative, the friends repair the boat and set out on their first voyage with Koothara. After failing to catch fish, they are caught in a violent storm and become stranded at sea. Usthad contacts them and reveals that abandoning them is revenge for their earlier encounter, leaving them with poison as an apparent means of ending their lives. During their ordeal, Tharun confesses that he previously had a relationship with Swathi.

Refusing to give up, the trio repair the boat, resume fishing and successfully catch enough fish to return safely to shore. They discover that Usthad has disappeared but has returned the money they paid for the boat. Inspired by their experience, they abandon fishing and revive Yellowtooth, eventually building it into a successful company.

Ram marries Shilpa, Tharun marries Swathi, and Koobrin begins a relationship with his former classmate Roshni. During a prank involving a hidden microphone on Tharun and Swathi's wedding night, it is revealed that Tharun is the biological father of Swathi's son.

In the closing scenes, Koothara narrates the story to his son, while Usthad is shown swimming with two mermaids, suggesting that he has finally been freed from his curse.

== Cast ==
- Mohanlal as Serian Semiramis Aegan Derketoa / Ustaad Saali (extended cameo)
- Bharath as Koobrin "Kalikkaran" Antony
- Sunny Wayne as Ram Manohar
- Tovino Thomas as Tharun Madhavan
- Bhavana as Swathy
- Janani as Noora
- Gauthami Nair as Roshni
- Shritha Sivadas as Shilpa
- Nyra Banerjee as Sheistha
- Josekutty Valiyakallumkal as Chandran Sir
- Bibin Perumbilli as Azhar
- Anjali Nair as Priya Miss
- Baburaj as Principal Musthafa
- Ranjini as Ram's mother
- Lishoy as Koobrin's father
- Urmila Unni as Tharun's mother
- Nilambur Ayisha as Muslim lady
- Subbalakshmi as Madhavikutty Koobrin's grandmother
- Arun Benny as Kannan
- Neena Kurup as Ammini
- Sasi Kalinga as Sulaiman
- Aneesh Gopal as Lapthaghosh
- Sunil Sukhada as House Owner
- Kalabhavan Abi as Thufalikka
- Kollam Thulasi as Bar Manager
- Sundra Pandian as Bar Supplier
- Arun Vishwam as Bar Supplier
- Liju Krishna as Sali's Gang Member
- Prem Kumar as Himself (cameo appearance)

== Production ==
Bharath was signed as one of the lead actors for the film. Ranjini was cast for an important role. Madhuurima stated that she would essay the role of Shaista, an NRI in the film. Shritha Sivadas said that her character Shilpa was a simple village girl and that she was paired opposite Sunny Wayne, who played a college student.

The shooting started at Calicut University Institute of Engineering and Technology, Thenhipalam on 25 September 2013. The film was also shot in Kochi, Kozhikode, Thodupuzha, Kodungaloor and the Andaman and Nicobar Islands.

Koothara's poster, designed by YellowTooth, was shortlisted for International Movie Poster Awards (IMP Awards).

== Soundtrack ==
The soundtrack features songs composed by Gopi Sundar and Thakara. The lyrics were written by Hari Narayanan, Thakara and San Jaimt .

Track list

No.	Title	Lyrics	Singer(s)	Length
1.	"Kannethadoore"	Hari Narayanan	Rita Thyagarajan & Gopi Sundar	3:34
2.	"The Country Song"	Hari Naraanan	Jayen Varma	3:46
3.	"Penne"	Hari Narayanan	Sharan Raj	3:22
4.	"Praanth"	Hari Narayanan	Gopi Chandhana	3:48
5.	"Vasudeva"	Hari Narayanan, San Jaimt	Pavithra Menon, San Jaimt & Gopi Sundar	3:22
6.	"Avasaanamayi"	Thakara	James Thakara	2.59
7.	"Promo Song-GVQ"	Thakara	Thakara	4:33
8.	"Official Trailer (Narration)"	--	Dulquer Salmaan	1:50
Total length:				24:27

== Reception ==
=== Critical response ===
The film received negative reviews. Times of India rated it 2.5/5 and said "It cannot be called an enjoyable movie despite a rich verve of youthful energy that is pumped into it. Often it is low, degrading and utterly disappointing rarely eliciting any real laughter."

Gayathry of Oneindia.in said, "Koothara is a one time watchable flick. There are lot to see and laugh during the first half but, the movie disappoints during the second half and reviewed the movie 2/5."

Raj Vikaram of metromatinee said, "Negative title will only serve to accentuate the movie's collapse not that 'koothara', is most badly made movie which is insufficient to the hilt. But its attempt to be a surprise packet, doesn't bear fruit beyond a point."

Deccan Chronicle stated " Koothara is good in parts, just like a use-and-throw razor" and appreciated the technical aspects of the movie.

=== Box office ===
International Business Times reported that Koothara had a first day box office collection of ₹1.3 crore (US$140,000).
