= Krishnankutty Pani Thudangi =

2021 film by Sooraj Tom

- Promotional poster
- Directed by: Sooraj Tom
- Written by: Anand Madhusoodanan
- Produced by: Noble Jose
- Starring: Vishnu Unnikrishnan; Saniya Iyappan; Vijilesh Karayad
- Cinematography: Jithu Damodar
- Edited by: Kiran Das
- Music by: Anand Madhusoodanan
- Production companies: Peppercorn Studios; IIFAR Media
- Distributed by: Zee5
- Release date: 11 April 2021
- Country: India
- Language: Malayalam

Krishnankutty Pani Thudangi(transl. Krishnankutty started the job) is a 2021 Indian rape revenge psychological horror film directed by Sooraj Tom who had earlier directed ‘Pa.Va’ and ‘Ente Mezhuthiri Athazhangal’. It was released on 11 April 2021 simultaneously through Zee Keralam television channel and Zee5 app.

== Plot ==
Unnikannan (Vishnu Unnikrishnan) is a male home nurse who arrives at an isolated bungalow in the middle of the forest to take care of an elderly man. His granddaughter Beatrice (Saniya Iyappan) tries to send Unnikannan back because her parents are not home.

Unnikannan narrates the story of Krishnankutty, a spirit terrorizing his village, and slyly tells Beatrice that no one would find out if something happened to her in the midst of such a huge estate. She retorts to his indecent advances by frightening him. Unnikannan finds a severed head outside the bungalow and informs Beatrice about it, who in turn reveals how her grandmother was murdered by her grandfather and that her spirit is out for vengeance. A terrified Unnikannan urges Beatrice to flee with him but in a horrific twist of events, it is revealed that there is no ghost and it was actually Beatrice who committed the murder, with the help of another man Linto (Vijilesh Karayad).

Unnikannan finds a diary which revealed Beatrice was a young Sri Lankan girl adopted by a Keralite family. The patriarch of the family controlled everyone and sexually abused Beatrice. The son of her adoptive parents also abused her while they turned a blind eye to her suffering. After years of torture and abuse, Beatrice attacks the grandfather and leaves him paralyzed. She yearns for revenge on the whole family. After reading the diary, Unnikannan manages to escape the room about the same time Beatrice and Linto finish disposing off the corpses. She then tries to kill Linto but he tackles her and hits her back. She pushes him down and tries to kill him but when she notices Unnikannan escaping, she runs behind him. He is saved from her when she is tackled by Linto and both of them fall into a pit.

In the next scene, a bandaged Unnikannan is narrating the experience to his friends who refuse to believe him and accuse him of being too lazy to find a job. An irritated Unnikannan walks home alone but is stopped by someone (apparently Krishnankutty's spirit). In the final scene, the bloody hand of Beatrice climbs out of the pit.

== Cast ==
- Vishnu Unnikrishnan as Unnikannan
- Saniya Iyappan as Beatrice
- Santhosh Damodharan as Luyi Paappan
- Vijilesh Karayad as Linto
- Srikant Murali as Krishnankutty
- Dharmajan Bolgatty as Sanoj
