= Kotthu =

Film directed by Sibi Malayil

- First look poster
- Directed by: Sibi Malayil
- Written by: Hemanth Kumar
- Produced by: Ranjith; P. M. Sasidharan
- Starring: Asif Ali; Nikhila Vimal; Roshan Mathew
- Cinematography: Prasanth Raveendran
- Edited by: Rathin Radhakrishnan
- Music by: Kailas Menon (Songs); Jakes Bejoy (Score)
- Production company: Gold Coin Motion Picture Company
- Release date: 16 September 2022
- Running time: 155 minutes
- Country: India
- Language: Malayalam

Kotthu (transl. Stab) is a 2022 Indian Malayalam-language political thriller film directed by Sibi Malayil and written by Hemanth Kumar. It was produced by Ranjith and P. M. Sasidharan. The film stars Asif Ali, Nikhila Vimal, Roshan Mathew, Ranjith, and Sreelakshmi in important roles. Jakes Bejoy composed the original score, while Kailas Menon composed the original songs. It also marks the comeback of Sibi Malayil after seven years. The film received mixed reviews and was a box office failure.

== Plot ==
Inspired by several real-life incidents, the film tells the life of political party workers from Northern Kerala and their bloodshed to reinvigorate the rebellious nature of the parties and the untouchable party worker status at the cost of lives.

== Cast ==
- Asif Ali as Shanavas (Shanu), a member of the political party KCP(M)
- Nikhila Vimal as Hizana (Hizu), Shanu's wife
- Roshan Mathew as Sumesh Chandran, Shanu's friend and party member
- Ranjith as Sadhanandan, the party secretary
- Sreelakshmi as Ammini, Sumesh's mother
- Vijilesh Karayad as Ajith, Shanu's friend
- Atul Ram Kumar as Sreejith, Shanu's friend
- Sudev Nair as A.S.P Niteesh Mitra
- Sreejith Ravi as M. N. Nagendran
- Raghunath Paleri as Hamsa, Hizu's father
- Jitin Puthenchery as Ajmal, Hizu's brother
- Hakkim Shajahan as Yousaf
- Kottayam Ramesh as Balan Master
- Appunni Sasi as the police constable

== Production ==
Principal photography of the film began on 10 October 2020 at Kozhikode following the COVID-19 protocols and safety measures. Kotthu is actor Asif Ali's fourth collaboration with director Sibi Malayil after Apoorvaragam, Violin, and Unnam. The first schedule of the filming at Kozhikode was completed on 25 October 2020.

== Release ==
The film was released in theatres on 16 September 2022.

== Reception ==
The Times of India gave the film 3 out of 5 stars, calling it an insightful political drama that shines a light on the human toll behind political murders in Kerala. It highlighted strong performances from Asif Ali and Roshan Mathew, noting how well the script demonstrates the way political fanaticism pushes young people toward violence.

S.R. Praveen from The Hindu, commended the film’s "laudable message against political violence" and its empathetic focus on the human and familial fallout on both sides of the conflict. However, the reviewer noted that the film "does not tread any new ground" and felt its overall treatment of the subject was somewhat dated and simplistic compared to earlier Malayalam political dramas.
