= Sri Sri Sri Raja Vaaru =

Indian Telugu-language film by Satish Vegesna

- Theatrical release poster
- Directed by: Satish Vegesna
- Written by: Satish Vegesna
- Based on: Theevandi
- Produced by: Chinthapalli Ramarao
- Starring: Narne Nithiin; Sampada Hulivana; Naresh; Rao Ramesh
- Cinematography: Damu Narravula
- Edited by: Madhu
- Music by: Kailas Menon
- Production company: Sri Vedakshara Movies
- Release date: 6 June 2025
- Running time: 122 minutes
- Country: India
- Language: Telugu

Sri Sri Sri Raja Vaaru is a 2025 Indian Telugu-language action comedy film written and directed by Satish Vegesna. The film features Narne Nithiin, Sampada Hulivana, Naresh and Rao Ramesh in important roles.

A remake of the 2018 Malayalam film Theevandi, it was released on 6 June 2025.

== Cast ==
- Narne Nithiin as Raja
- Sampada Hulivana as Nithya
- Naresh as Subbaraju, Raja’s father
- Rao Ramesh as Krishnamurthy, Nithya’s father
- Subhalekha Sudhakar as MLA
- Raghu Kunche as Lanka Hippie 1
- Ravi Varma as Lanka Hippie 2
- Mamilla Shailaja Priya as Raja’s mother
- Praveen as Raja’s brother-in-law
- Sudharshan as Safar, Raja’s friend
- Bhadram as Suribabu, Raja’s friend
- Niharika Harshu as Nithya’s mother
- Racha Ravi as Krishnamurthy’s right-hand man
- Meena Vasu as Meena, Raja’s sister
- Anantha Prabhu as Raja’s uncle
- Sarayu Roy as Saraswati, Panchayat President
- Anand Ramaraju as Saraswati’s husband
- BHEL Prasad Rao as Villager

== Music ==
The soundtrack and background score of the film were composed by Kailas Menon.

All lyrics are written by Sri Mani.

Track listing
No.	Title	Singer(s)	Length
1.	"Madhuram Kada"	Shreya Ghoshal, K. S. Harisankar	3:25
2.	"Mana Sri Sri Sri Raja Vaaru"	Anudeep Dev, Prakash Chodimalla	3:28

== Production and release ==
The film was officially announced in 2022 and was supposed to be Narne Nithiin's debut film. Shot extensively in Andhra Pradesh, the release was rescheduled several times due to delays in production. Its release was deferred multiple times, first scheduled for 11 October 2024, and later 28 November 2024, before finally releasing on 6 June 2025. It began streaming on Aha and Amazon Prime Video on 4 July 2025.

== Reception ==
10TV rated the film 2.75 out of 5. Eenadu praised the performances of Rao Ramesh and Naresh, while criticizing weak story, screenplay and narration.
