= Kaakee Circus =

2026 Tamil-language web series

- காக்கி சர்க்கஸ்
- Genre: Fantasy; Comedy; Thriller
- Written by: Akash Chandramohan; Ameen Barif
- Directed by: Ameen Barif
- Starring: Munishkanth; Subash Selvam; Rajesh Madhavan; Gauthami Nair; Vinsu Rache
- Composer: Vibin Baskar
- Country of origin: India
- Original language: Tamil
- No. of seasons: 1
- No. of episodes: 7

Production
- Cinematography: Neeraj Revi
- Editor: Arjune Babu
- Production company: ZEE5

Original release
- Release: April 10, 2026 – present

Kaakee Circus is an Indian Tamil-language fantasy comedy-thriller web series written and directed by Ameen Barif. The series stars Munishkanth, Subash Selvam, and Rajesh Madhavan in lead roles. The seven-episode series is set to premier on 10 April 2026.

== Plot ==
Set in a sub-jail in a fictional coastal town, the story follows a book-loving jailer and an enthusiastic young constable. Their routine is disrupted when a mysterious and eccentric thief attempts an impossible feat: breaking into the high-security jail. The thief's objective is to steal a temple donation box stored within the premises, leading to a chaotic series of events involving the local police force and the town's residents.

== Cast ==
- Munishkanth
- Subash Selvam
- Rajesh Madhavan
- Gauthami Nair
- Vinsu Rachel Sam

== Production ==
The series was written and directed by Ameen Barif. During its early development stages, the project was titled Once Upon a Time in Kayamkulam before being officially renamed to Kaakee Circus.
