= Kailas Menon =

Indian composer

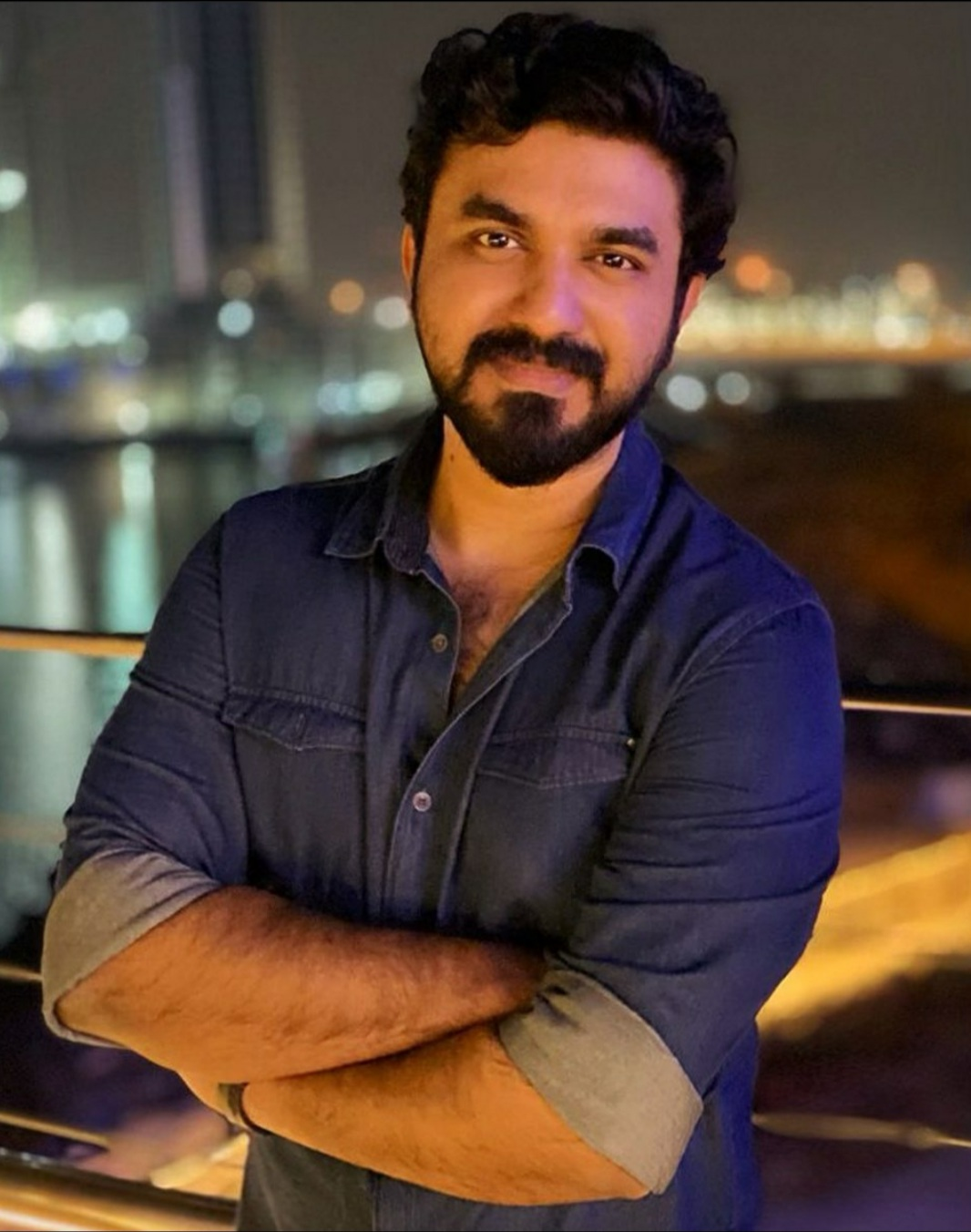
- Born: 30 May 1986 (age 40); Thrissur, Kerala, India
- Occupations: Composer; music producer
- Years active: 2008–present
- Spouse: Annapoorna Lekha Pillai (m. 2014)
- Children: Samanyu Rudra(br.2020)
- Musical career
- Instrument: Keyboard
- Labels: Kailas Menon Productions; Goodwill Entertainments; Muzik247

Kailas Menon is an Indian film composer who works predominantly in Malayalam films and commercials. After working as a composer for television commercials for more than a decade, he debuted as a composer in feature films with director Jayaraj's Pakarnnatam. His first mainstream release happened much later with Theevandi, for which he earned his first Filmfare Award.

== Early life ==
Kailas was born in Thrissur, Kerala on 30 May 1986. He learned carnatic music for eight years and was a self-trained keyboard player. He completed his schooling from Bharatiya Vidya Bhavan, Thrissur. He graduated in Visual Communications from SRM Institute of Science and Technology, Chennai, and pursued a course in sound engineering from SAE Institute, Chennai.

== Career ==
Menon had his first release, the music album Snehathode, at the age of 16.

His professional career began much later, when he joined as an assistant to Malayalam film composer Ouseppachan and subsequently became a sound engineer for Gopi Sunder.

This was followed by a decade-long stint as a composer of television commercials, having scored for over 1000 commercials for brands like Rolls-Royce, Samsung, Toshiba, Unilever, and Bhima Jewellers.

He debuted as a film composer with Jayaraj's off-beat film Pakarnnattam. This was followed by Starring Pournami, which was shelved midway. His first mainstream release happened much later, with Theevandi. The song "Jeevamshamayi", rendered by Shreya Ghoshal and K. S. Harisankar, earned him a Filmfare Award.

In 2019, he launched his own music label, Kailas Menon Productions, and the first film album released from the label was Finals.

== Personal life ==
Menon married Annapoorna Lekha Pillai, a lawyer at the Kerala High Court, on 8 December 2014. Their son, Samanyu Rudra, was born on 17 August 2020.

== Film discography ==
Year	Title	Language	Songs	Background score	Notes
2011	Starring Pournami	Malayalam	Yes	Yes	Unreleased film
2012	Pakarnnaattam	Malayalam	N/A	Yes	
2018	Theevandi	Malayalam	Yes	Yes	Maiden release
2019	Ittymaani: Made in China	Malayalam	Yes	No	One song only
2019	Finals	Malayalam	Yes	Yes	
2019	Edakkad Battalion 06	Malayalam	Yes	Yes	
2021	Six Hours	Malayalam	Yes	Yes	
2021	Member Rameshan 9aam Ward	Malayalam	Yes	Yes	
2021	Kotthu	Malayalam	Yes	No	
2022	Kallan D’Souza	Malayalam	No	Yes	
2022	Vaashi	Malayalam	Yes	No	
2022	Nalaam Mura	Malayalam	Yes	No	
2023	Dear Vaappi	Malayalam	Yes	Yes	
2023	Janaki Jaane	Malayalam	Yes	No	
2023	Flush	Malayalam	Yes	Yes	
2023	Nalla Nilavulla Rathri	Malayalam	Yes	Yes	
2023	Jaladhara Pumpset Since 1962	Malayalam	Yes	Yes	
2025	L Jagadamma Ezham Class B	Malayalam	Yes	Yes	
2025	Sri Sri Sri Raja Vaaru	Telugu	Yes	Yes	

== Awards and nominations ==
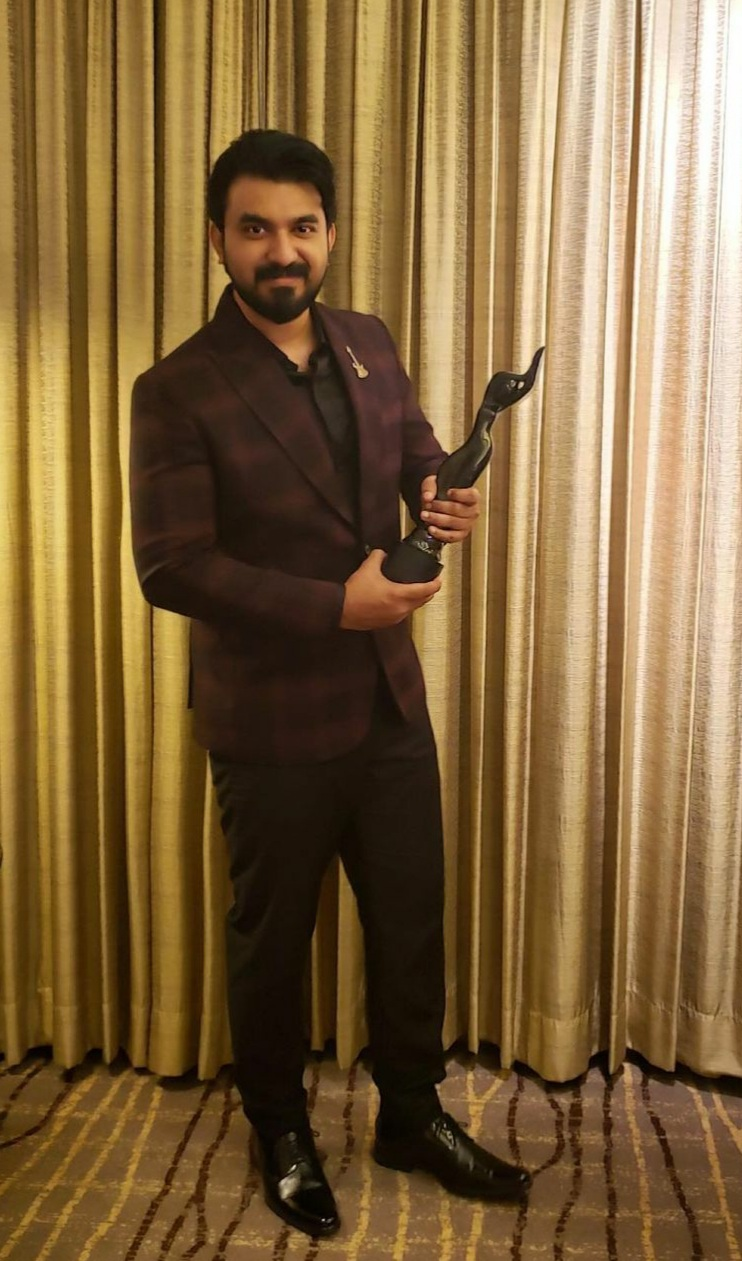
Menon with his Filmfare award

Award	Year	Project	Category	Outcome
Filmfare Award	2019	Theevandi	Best Music Director - Malayalam	Won
Kerala Film Critics Association Awards	2019	Theevandi	Best Music Director	Won
Mazhavil Entertainment Awards	2019	Theevandi	Best Music Director	Won
Asiavision Awards	2019	Theevandi	Best Music Director	Won

Additional awards	Outcome
Indiewood Film Award	Won
Nana Film Award	Won
Janmabhoomi Award	Won
Jaycee Foundation Award	Won
ACV Johnson Master Award	Won
Ramu Kariat Award (Finals BGM)	Won
Creative Film Award	Won
