= Jaladhara Pumpset Since 1962 =

2023 Malayalam film by Ashish Chinnappa

- Theatrical release poster
- Directed by: Ashish Chinnappa
- Written by: Ashish Chinnappa; Prajin M. P.
- Story by: Sanu K. Chandran
- Produced by: Baiju Chellamma; Sagar Rajan; Sanitha Sasidharan; Arya Prithviraj
- Starring: Urvashi; Indrans; Sanusha; Johny Antony; T. G. Ravi
- Cinematography: Sajith Purushan
- Edited by: Rathin Radhakrishnan
- Music by: Kailas Menon
- Production company: Wonderframes Filmland
- Distributed by: Wonderframes Filmland; Sree Priya Combines
- Release date: 11 August 2023
- Running time: 139 minutes
- Country: India
- Language: Malayalam

Jaladhara Pumpset Since 1962 is an Indian Malayalam-language satirical comedy-drama film directed by Ashish Chinnappa in his directorial debut. Ashish Chinnappa and Prajin M. P. co-wrote the film, based on the story by Sanu K. Chandran. The film stars Urvashi and Indrans as the lead characters, with Sanusha, Sagar Rajan, Johny Antony, and T. G. Ravi in the supporting cast. The plot of the film centres around the theft of a pump set from Mrinalini's residence, which subsequently becomes a case and drags on for years in court.

The film is jointly produced by Baiju Chellamma, Sagar Rajan, Sanitha Sasidharan, and Arya Prithviraj under the banner of Wonderframes Filmland. Music is composed by Kailas Menon, with cinematography and editing by Sajith Purushan and Rathin Radhakrishnan. The film was released in theatres on 11 August 2023.

== Cast ==
- Urvashi as Mrinalini teacher<
- Indrans as Motor Mani
- Sanusha as Chippi, Mrinalini's daughter
- Sagar Rajan as Unni, Mrinalini's driver
- Johny Antony as Advocate Bhattathiri, appearing for Mani
- T. G. Ravi as Advocate Ravi, appearing for Mrinalini
- Vijayaraghavan as Chandran Mash, Mrinalini's husband
- Nisha Sarang as Lalitha, Mani's wife
- Jayan Cherthala as Bahuleyan, First-Class Judicial Magistrate
- Althaf Salim as Arun
- Shivaji Guruvayoor as Rajendran, Police Sub-inspector
- Sajin Cherukayil as Gireesh
- Kalabhavan Haneef as Shaji
- Adhil Bruno as Ambaran
- Vishnu Govindhan as Sumesh
- Davinchi Santhosh as Tea Supplyer
- Thankachan Vithura as Adakka Pothen
- Joshy Medayil as Advocate Joji
- Anjali Sunil Kumar as Anjali, Mani's daughter
- Sneha Babu as Kingini
- Nitha Karma as Bindhu
- Shailaja Ambu as Kavitha
- Sree Ramya as Ambili

== Production ==
=== Filming ===
The film's switch-on and pooja were held at Chottanikkara Temple on 14 July 2022. The shooting began on 15 July 2022, and was wrapped up in August. Kollengode in Palakkad district was the main filming location.

=== Marketing ===
The first-look poster for the film was released on 4 July 2023. It was revealed by Suresh Gopi through his social media handles, which featured Indrans, Urvashi, Sanusha, Sagar Rajan, Johny Antony, T. G. Ravi, and Anjali Sunil Kumar. A character poster titled Muthirangadi Kalavara Team featuring Shailaja, Sneha Babu, Nitha Karma, and Sree Ramya was released on 31 July 2023.

== Soundtrack ==
Jaladhara Pumpset Since 1962

Soundtrack album by Kailas Menon
- Released: 2023
- Venues: Kochi, Chennai
- Studios: K-Space; K7 Studios; Octaves Studio
- Genre: Feature film soundtrack
- Language: Malayalam
- Label: T-Series

Kailas Menon chronology
Nalla Nilavulla Rathri (2023)	Jaladhara Pumpset Since 1962 (2023)

Kailas Menon composed the film's music and background score, while Manu Manjith and B. K. Harinarayanan wrote the lyrics. T-Series obtained the film's audio rights.

No.	Title	Lyrics	Singer(s)	Length
1.	"Kuruvi"	Manu Manjith	Vaishnav Girish	4:12
2.	"Ee Mazhamukilo"	B. K. Harinarayanan	K. S. Chitra	2:54

== Release ==
=== Theatrical ===
The film was released in theatres on 11 August 2023 by Wonderframes Filmland through Sree Priya Combines.

=== Home media ===
The digital streaming rights of the film is acquired by JioCinema and started streaming from 15 September 2024.

== Reception ==
=== Critical response ===
S. R. Praveen of The Hindu wrote "The popularity of recent courtroom dramas based on seemingly small incidents, like 'Saudi Vellakka' or 'Nna Thaan Case Kodu' is clearly an inspiration for this attempt at following a successful formula." Princy Alexander of Onmanorama wrote "The narrative, while avoiding preachiness, adeptly highlights the repercussions of human actions and choices, skillfully balancing humour and sentimentality." Vignesh Madhu of The New Indian Express gave 2.5 out of 5 stars and wrote "While Jaladhara Pumpset starts off like a legal fight between a retired school teacher and a local thief, it eventually comes down to the question of adhering to the law or conscience. While the writing does deserve some praise, it's unfortunate that such profound themes couldn't be explored more effectively."
