= Rahul R. Sarma =

Indian film director

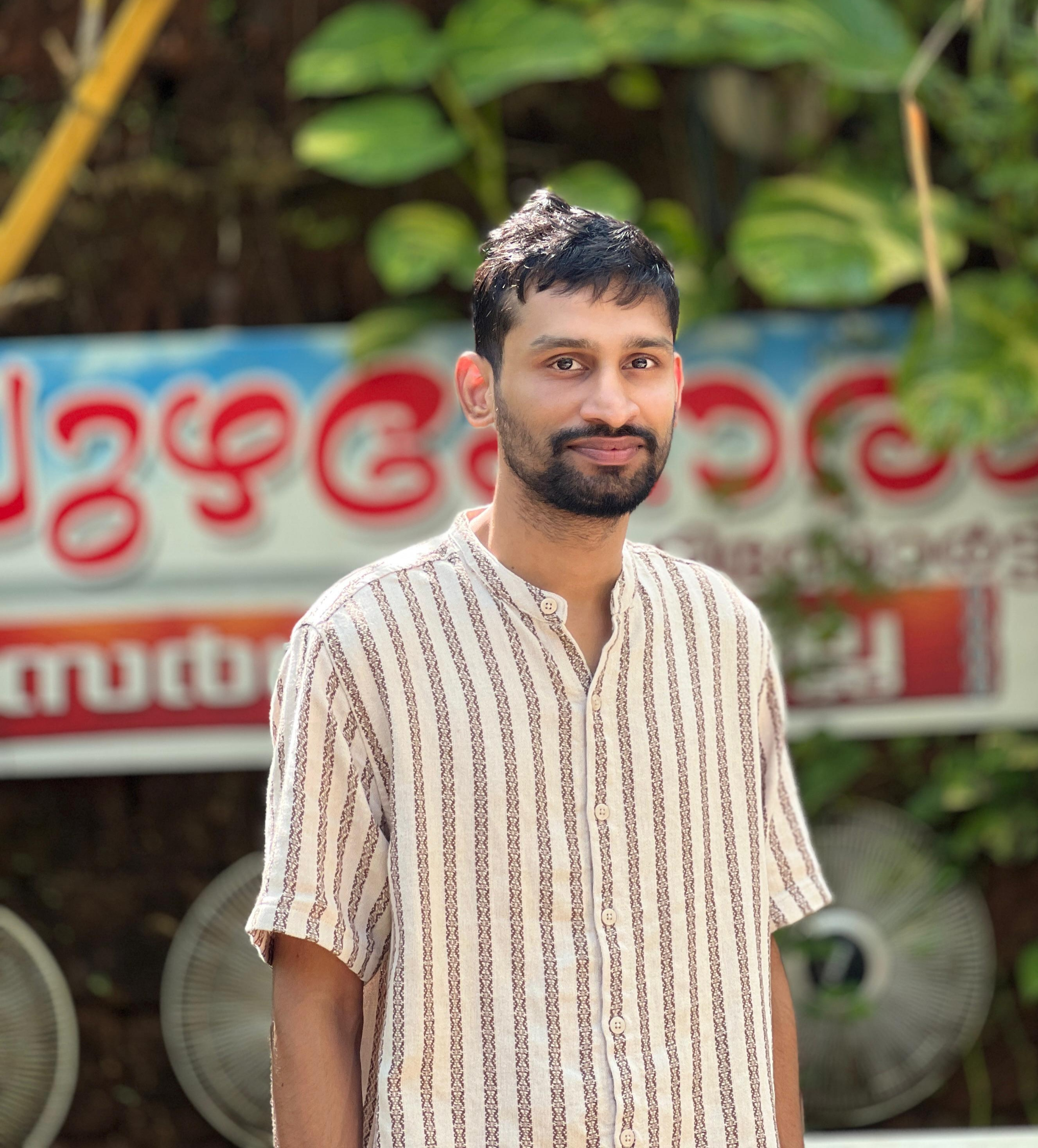
- Born: Kunnamkulam , Thrissur
- Occupation: Film director
- Years active: 2019

Rahul R. Sarma is an Indian film director, writer, editor and lyricist working in the Malayalam film Industry. His film Village Cricket Boy won the Kerala State Television Awards for Best Children's Film in 2022.

== Career ==
Rahul has directed five short films and he was worked as an associated director of Midhun Manuel Thomas.

Rahul's debut film is based on the short story 'Sakshi' written by P. V. Shajikumar.

== Filmography ==
Key
†	Denotes films that have not yet been released

=== Short film ===
Year	Title	Director	Screenwriter	Editor
2017	Oru Ottam Poyalo	Yes	No	Yes
2019	Raghavan	Yes	No	Yes
2022	Night Saloon	Yes	Yes	Yes
2022	Pedi	Yes	No	Yes
2022	Village Cricket Boy	Yes	No	Yes

=== Assistant director ===
Year	Title	Director
2019	Argentina Fans Kaattoorkadavu	Midhun Manuel Thomas
2019	Janamaithri	John Manthrickal
2020	Anjaam Pathiraa	Midhun Manuel Thomas
2023	Valatty	Devan Jayakumar
2023	Phoenix	Vishnu Bharathan
2024	Abraham Ozler	Midhun Manuel Thomas

=== Lyricist ===
Year	Title	Song name
2024	Kanakarajyam	"Kaanaadhoorathaaro"
2026	Vivaah	"Mayaathe"

=== Director ===
Year	Title	Screenwriter	Notes
	Untitled †	P. V. Shajikumar	Debut film
