= Vijilesh Karayad =

Indian actor

- Born: Karayad, Perambra, Kozhikode district
- Education: Sree Sankaracharya University of Sanskrit, Mahatma Gandhi University
- Occupation: Actor
- Years active: 2016–present
- Spouse: Swathi Haridas

Vijilesh Karayad is an Indian actor works in malayalam cinema, known for his performances in Maheshinte Prathikaaram, Varathan, kothth and Krishnankutty Pani Thudangi.

== Early life and career ==
Vijilesh grew up in Karayad, Perambra in the Kozhikode district of Kerala and attended Sree Sankaracharya University of Sanskrit, Kalady, and he also studied in School of letters Mahatma Gandhi University, Kottayam where he received his Master of Philosophy degree in theatre studies. He married Swathi Haridas, a trained high school teacher in sociology. His first noteworthy role was in Dileesh Pothan’s Maheshinte Prathikaaram, as a timid man who learns kung fu to protect his sister from eve-teasers. He played a notable supporting role in the 2021 rape and revenge horror film Krishnankutty Pani Thudangi.

== Filmography ==
Key
†	Denotes films that have not yet been released

Year	Title	Role	Notes
2016	Maheshinte Prathikaaram	Martial Arts Guy	
2016	Kali	Moped Guy	
2016	Guppy	Pappoy	
2017	Alamara	Photographer	
2017	Varnyathil Aashanka	Parthan	
2017	Vimaanam	Venkidi's Friend	
2017	Aabhaasam		
2017	Nalpathiyonnu (41)	Lijo	
2017	Thrissivaperoor Kliptham		
2018	Nimir		Tamil
2018	Kallai FM		
2018	Sukhamano Daveede		
2018	Premasoothram	Pandan Paramu	
2018	Theevandi	Libash	
	Varathan	Jithin	
2019	Panthu		
2019	Happy Sardar	Eldho	
2020	Kappela	Riyas	
2021	Krishnankutty Pani Thudangi		
2021	Peace	Jomon	
2021	Ajagajantharam	Eden	
2022	Salute		
2022	State Bus		
2022	Kotthu	Moeen	
2022	Appan	Boban	
2023	Laika		
2023	Corona Papers		
2023	Corona Dhavan	Manu	
2023	Ramachandra Boss & Co		
2024	Perumani		
2024	Bougainvillea		
