= Boomerang (2023 film) =

2023 Malayalam film

- Theatrical release poster
- Directed by: Manu Sudhakaran
- Written by: Manu Sudhakaran
- Produced by: Aji Medayyi; Thoufeek R
- Starring: Shine Tom Chacko
- Cinematography: Vishnu Narayanan
- Edited by: Akhil A. R.
- Music by: Subheer Ali Khan; KP
- Release date: 24 February 2023
- Country: India
- Language: Malayalam

Boomerang is a 2023 Indian Malayalam-language film directed by Manu Sudhakaran and produced by Aji Medayyil and Thoufeek R. The film features Samyuktha in the lead role. The film was released on 24 February 2023.

== Cast ==
- Shine Tom Chacko as Roney
- Chemban Vinod Jose as S.I Vishwanathan
- Baiju as Jayadevan
- Dain Davis
- Mary Benedit as Fish seller
- Baby as Fish seller
- Samyuktha as Honey Paul / Anjali

== Production ==
Prithviraj Sukumaran revealed the motion poster of the film. Later, the trailer was released on 13 January 2023. The Production team announced the film will release on 24 February 2023.

== Controversy ==
During a press meet in Kochi, producer of the film mentioned that actress Samyuktha Menon is not cooperating with the promotion of the film.

== Reception ==
Sharon Shaji critic of Samayam noted that "The first half of the film, which goes through several stages, is used to set the stage for the story" and gave 3 out of 5 stars. Lensmen reviews critic stated that "The entire first half of the movie has them introducing each of the characters in stretched-out scenes. Manu Sudhakaran seems to have lost judgment on what scenes will work".
