= Theevandi =

2018 film by Fellini T. P.

- Theatrical release poster
- Directed by: Fellini T. P.
- Written by: Vini Vishwa Lal
- Produced by: August Cinema
- Starring: Tovino Thomas; Samyuktha; Surabhi Lakshmi; Saiju Kurup
- Cinematography: Gautham Sankar
- Edited by: Appu Bhattathiri
- Music by: Kailas Menon
- Production company: August Cinema
- Distributed by: August Cinema
- Release date: 7 September 2018 (India)
- Running time: 143 minutes
- Country: India
- Language: Malayalam

Theevandi (transl. Train) is a 2018 Indian Malayalam-language romantic comedy drama film directed by Fellini T. P. (in his directorial debut) and written by Vini Vishwa Lal. The film stars Tovino Thomas, Samyuktha, Sudheesh, Surabhi Lakshmi, Rajesh Sharma, Suraj Venjarammoodu, Saiju Kurup, and Shammi Thilakan in lead roles. Principal photography began in November 2017 and ended around January 2018. Kailas Menon composed the music and Appu Bhattathiri was the editor. The film was released on 7 September 2018. It was remade in Telugu as Sri Sri Sri Raja Vaaru (2025).

== Plot ==
Damodaran, a resident of the fictional village of Pullinad, is unable to transport his pregnant wife to the hospital due to heavy rain and the riots following the assassination of Rajiv Gandhi. His wife's brother, referred to as Ammavan by the protagonist and his friends, arranges for a midwife. Damodaran is initially against it but later agrees. Unfortunately, the child is stillborn, and this devastates Damodaran. He places the lifeless child on a table and goes to see his wife whose condition has worsened. Ammavan, a chain smoker, blows smoke at the seemingly dead child, which causes it to begin breathing.

The child is named Bineesh. As a child, Bineesh buys cigarettes for his uncle using his allowance. When he becomes a teenager, he is prompted by his friend Safar to smoke a cigarette and eventually becomes addicted. Due to a foolish statement made by Safar, Bineesh is caught in the school for smoking and is asked to bring his parents. He decides to bring his uncle instead. That night, while he is going to meet his uncle, he sees a packet of cigarettes and chooses to smoke one. He heads outside and smokes peacefully. However, he is mistaken for a thief by two police constables and is taken to the police station; consequently, people learn about his secret.

As time passes, he becomes more and more addicted and receives the title of Theevandi (chain-smoker, colloquially). His elder sister eventually is married to Vijith, a Bharatiya Socialist Congress League (BSCL) party member while Bineesh falls in love with his childhood friend Devi. Devi is the daughter of Madhu, an active BSCL member. He is against his daughters' relationship with Bineesh but later relents on the condition that Bineesh reduces his smoking.

Devi belongs to a different caste that is accustomed to a different thaali, a holy thread tied around the bride's neck that signifies marriage. Bineesh purchases it, and Devi asks him to show it to her father. After forgetting several times, he decides to bring the thaali in a cigarette packet, which he is sure he will not forget. Devi's heart is broken on seeing the thaali inside the cigarette packet, and this leads to their breakup.

Meanwhile, Ammavan and Safar are shown to frequently visit Edison Thuruthu (Edison's Island) which is hinted at being a haven for drunkards and hippies. Bineesh is frustrated and decides to smoke sixteen packets of cigarettes at a time, setting a new world record. The MLA's Nepali driver, Sanju, gives the money for the cigarettes, confusing everyone. One day, while driving the car with the MLA, it is revealed that the driver is a victim of the Blue Whale Challenge and is about to commit suicide as his fiftieth and final task. The car crashes into the building where Bineesh is smoking. The MLA falls into a coma while the driver manages to escape. Later that night a tiff happens over the nomination of a BCSL candidate for the by-election. Since the MLA is in a coma, they feel that there is no chance of recovery. The majority chooses Madhu while Bineesh demands the nomination of his brother-in-law Vijith. Bineesh, who hates Madhu, does not want him to be the candidate. Madhu is an equally clever person and challenges Bineesh to abstain from smoking until a particular day when the party will organize a widespread protest in the village by forming a human chain. Madhu promises Bineesh that if he succeeds in this, he will renounce his claim to the nomination and let Vijith be the sole nominee. Bineesh accepts the challenge.

Madhu hires a network of spies to follow Bineesh. A few of them are asked to stay in his house and try to make him smoke. Bineesh can refrain from smoking for the first few days, but soon his body begins to react. One night he sneaks out of the house to smoke a cigarette. Libash, Madhu's spy, notices this and climbs a nearby tree to capture a video of Bineesh smoking. Luckily for Bineesh, there happens to be a giant snake in that tree that startles Libash, who falls before Bineesh lights his cigarette. Libash is taken to the hospital, and Madhu's spies accompany him. Vijith finds the cigarettes and decides to take Bineesh to Edison Island. Madhu discovers this and informs his party members. When Vijith returns to the banks after dropping Bineesh on the island, he puts on an act in front of the party members and takes a spy of Madhu to Edison Island.

Meanwhile, Bineesh finds that he has been cheated since Edison Island is devoid of drugs, alcohol, and cigarettes. It is inhabited by two hippie-like musicians, Rasputin and Bob Marley. They moved to the island because they were unable to put up with politics in Pullinad. Bineesh is unable to leave the island since he cannot swim. Safar hires a group of goons to guard the island and wards off Madhu's men who try to smuggle cigarettes to the island on the pretext of meeting Bineesh. After several failed smuggling attempts by Madhu's men, he approaches Libash for an idea. The person who is nursing Libash arranges a group of young men who are practitioners of the Indian martial art Kalaripayattu.

On the last day, the day of the human chain protest, Libash goes with the group and thrashes the goons guarding the banks, and reaches the island on a boat. Upon arrival, Libash prompts Bineesh to smoke an imported cigarette. By now, Bineesh has learned to love the world without cigarettes. He refuses the cigarette and thereby wins the challenge. Vijith is happy, but at the last minute, the MLA returns in a wheelchair to inaugurate the event, thereby shattering Vijiths' dreams. Vijith slips into smoking, thereby becoming a new companion for Ammavan

== Cast ==
- Tovino Thomas as Bineesh Damodaran (Theevandi)
  - Maheen as Young Bineesh
- Samyuktha as Devi
  - Davia Mary as Young Devi
- Suraj Venjarammoodu as Madhu, Devi's Father
- Sudheesh as Sugunan
- Surabhi Lakshmi as Secretary Vishalam
- Saiju Kurup as Vijith, Bineesh's brother-in-law
- Muhammad Musthafa as Imbichi Koya
- Rajesh Sharma as Damodaran, Bineesh's father
- Shammi Thilakan as Balachandran M.L.A
- Aneesh Gopal as Saffer
  - Nithinraj as Young Saffer
- Jaffar Idukki as Grocery Shop Man
- Subeesh Sudhi as D. Narayanan
- Vijilesh Karayad as Libash
- Mannu Pillai as Manu aka Shwanan
  - Sanil Shanavas as Young Shwanan
- Mithun Nalini as Suseej
- Neena Kurup as Shailaja, Devi's Mother
- Vini Vishwa Lal as Shanavas Sir
- Mini K S as Saraswathi, Bineesh's Mother
- Arya as Beena, Bineesh's Sister
  - Shaniya Simon as Young Beena
- Bibin Perumbillikunnel as Rasputin Aashan
- Nivi Viswalal as Bob Marley
- Sumangal as Sanju Bhai
- Shaji Nadesan as Kalari Ashan
- Siyad Yedu as Raman
- Jayaraj as Ittooppu
- Suresh as Kuttiyappu
- Saradha as Lakshmiyamma
- Dr. Uma as Sudha
- Anand Bal as Doctor
- Hari as Pakku
- Manidas Payyoli as Beggar
- Master Aslan as Kannan

== Production ==
In November 2017, Tovino Thomas agreed to work with Fellini T. P. on his debut directorial titled Theevandi. Filming which began in November 2017 was wrapped in January 2018. Tovino plays a chain-smoker in the film. Newcomer Samyuktha Menon played the female lead role.

Fellini said that the film is a "coming-of-age drama" and contains smoking scenes almost throughout. He also said that the movie is a "feel-good entertainer" rather than a dark comedy despite the presence of cigarette smoking.

== Music ==
The music for the film is composed by Kailas Menon. B. K. Harinarayanan won the Kerala State Film Award for Best Lyrics for the song "Jeevamshamayi".

Soundtrack
No.	Title	Music	Singer(s)	Length
1.	"Jeevamshamayi Thaane"	Kailas Menon	Shreya Ghoshal, K. S. Harisankar	5:23
2.	"Thaa Thinnam"	Kailas Menon	Job Kurian	4:20
3.	"Maanathe Kanalaali"	Kailas Menon	Kailas Menon, Alphons Joseph	4:46
4.	"Oru Theeppettikkum Venda"	Kailas Menon	Anthony Daasan
5.	"Vijanatheerame"	Nivi Viswalal	Nivi Viswalal

== Release ==
=== Theatrical ===
The film was originally scheduled to release in May 2018, but was postponed to June end. The 29 June 2018 release date was further postponed due to Kerala Floods and was finally released on 7 September 2018.

=== Critical response ===
The Times of India rated 3.5 out of 5 stars. The Indian Express rated 3 out of 5 stars.

== Accolades ==
Award (Note: Awards, festivals and organizations are in alphabetical order.)	Date of ceremony (Note: Date is linked to the article about the awards held that year, wherever possible.)	Category	Recipient(s)	Result	Ref.
Asianet Film Awards	6–7 April 2019	Most Popular Actor	Tovino Thomas	Nominated	
Asianet Film Awards	6–7 April 2019	Best Character Actor	Suraj Venjaramoodu	Won	
Asianet Film Awards	6–7 April 2019	Best Music Director	Kailas Menon	Nominated	
Asianet Film Awards	6–7 April 2019	Best Lyricist	B.K.Harinarayanan	Won	
Asianet Film Awards	6–7 April 2019	Best Playback Singer (Male)	K. S. Harisankar	Nominated	
Asiavision Awards	16 February 2019	Best Actor	Tovino Thomas	Won	
Asiavision Awards	16 February 2019	Best Music Director	Kailas Menon	Won	
Asiavision Awards	16 February 2019	Best Lyricist	B.K.Harinarayanan	Won	
Filmfare Awards South	21 December 2019	Best Actor – Malayalam	Tovino Thomas	Nominated	
Filmfare Awards South	21 December 2019	Best Supporting Actor – Malayalam	Sudheesh	Nominated	
Filmfare Awards South	21 December 2019	Best Music Director – Malayalam	Kailas Menon	Won	
Filmfare Awards South	21 December 2019	Best Lyricist – Malayalam	B.K.Harinarayanan - ("Jeevamshamayi")	Won	
Kerala State Film Awards	27 July 2019	Best Lyricist	B.K.Harinarayanan - ("Jeevamshamayi")	Won	
South Indian International Movie Awards	15–16 August 2019	Best Actor – Malayalam	Tovino Thomas	Won	
South Indian International Movie Awards	15–16 August 2019	Best Music Director – Malayalam	Kailas Menon	Nominated	
South Indian International Movie Awards	15–16 August 2019	Best Lyricist – Malayalam	B.K.Harinarayanan - ("Jeevamshamayi")	Nominated	
South Indian International Movie Awards	15–16 August 2019	Best Male Playback Singer – Malayalam	K. S. Harisankar - ("Jeevamshamayi")	Nominated	
