= Bhramam =

2021 Indian film

- Official release poster
- Directed by: Ravi K. Chandran
- Screenplay by: Sarath Balan (dialogues)
- Based on: Andhadhun (2018) by Sriram Raghavan
- Starring: Prithviraj Sukumaran; Unni Mukundan; Mamta Mohandas; Raashii Khanna
- Cinematography: Ravi K. Chandran
- Edited by: Sreekar Prasad
- Music by: Jakes Bejoy
- Production companies: Viacom18 Studios; AP International
- Distributed by: Amazon Prime Video (India); AP International
- Release date: 7 October 2021
- Running time: 152 minutes
- Country: India
- Language: Malayalam

Bhramam (transl. Illusion) is a 2021 Indian Malayalam-language black comedy crime thriller film directed and filmed by Ravi K. Chandran. The film stars Prithviraj Sukumaran, Unni Mukundan, Mamta Mohandas, Raashii Khanna, Shankar and Jagadish. It is a remake of the 2018 Hindi film Andhadhun. The film was released on Amazon Prime Video in India and in theatres elsewhere on 7 October 2021. Bharatanatyam dancer Leela Samson made her Malayalam debut.

== Plot ==
The film opens with a boar hunter aiming his shot in a forest, just as the title appears dramatically with the screech of a violent car crash.

The narrative shifts to Ray Mathews, a talented blind pianist living alone in a rented house in Fort Kochi. He frequently performs at orphanages and churches, gaining appreciation for his soulful melodies. Meanwhile, veteran actor Uday Kumar enjoys a peaceful life with his wife Simi, until he's called to Chennai for a business deal worth ₹10 crore.

Ray meets Anna when her scooter accidentally hits him. Feeling guilty, she takes him to her family-run diner, where she and her father are moved by his music. After dropping him home, it's revealed that Ray is pretending to be blind—he removes his lenses and watches her ride away.

Their relationship grows over time, with Ray often performing at the diner. One evening, his tune impresses Uday Kumar, and Anna captures a photo of the two. Later, Uday informs Simi about his trip to Chennai, unaware that this will be his last goodbye.

Ray is invited to perform at Uday’s residence. While playing, he discovers Uday’s dead body and witnesses Simi and her lover Dinesh Prabhakar, a police officer, hide the corpse. Pretending to remain blind, Ray escapes and tries to alert the police, only to find that Dinesh is the investigating officer.

Soon, Uday’s death is declared a suicide, but a neighbor, Irene, suspects foul play. Before she can expose the truth, Simi murders her by pushing her off a building—a crime Ray also secretly witnesses. Later, Simi visits Ray, drugs him under the guise of offering sweets, and confirms her suspicion that he can see. The drug renders Ray permanently blind.

Anna breaks up with Ray after learning he faked his blindness, unaware of the truth behind his actions. Ray becomes a target, with Dinesh attempting to kill him. Ray narrowly escapes and is taken by organ traffickers Martha and Lopez, who are persuaded to spare him in exchange for money.

Ray blackmails Simi for ₹15 lakhs, demanding it for surgery and an escape abroad. Simi and Dinesh plot to kill him, but she is abducted by Martha and taken to Dr. Swamy, an unethical surgeon. Ray and Swamy coerce her into confessing her crimes, which they secretly record.

At a construction site, a confrontation with Dinesh leads to Lopez’s death, and Ray and Swamy knock Simi unconscious. Swamy suggests transplanting her corneas to restore Ray’s sight.

Two years later, Anna reunites with Ray in London after a concert. He recounts how Swamy intended to harvest Simi’s eyes, but she killed him and tried to run Ray over. In a twist of fate, the hunter’s bullet hits a boar, which crashes into Simi’s speeding car, causing a fatal accident.

Ray tells Anna he chose to remain blind, finding peace in his music and life. The film ends with Ray walking away, tapping his stick as a soda can rolls into the street—a quiet echo of his enduring rhythm.

== Cast ==
- Prithviraj Sukumaran as Ray Mathews
- Unni Mukundan as CI Dinesh Prabhakar
- Mamta Mohandas as Simi Udayakumar
- Raashii Khanna as Anna Simon
- Shankar as Udayakumar / Uday
- Jagadish as Dr. Swamy
- Ananya as Swapna Dinesh
- Sminu Sijo as Martha
- Aneesh Gopal as Lopez
- Sudheer Karamana as SI Saijo Babu
- Rajesh Babu as Simon, a diner owner and Anna's father
- Nandhana Varma as Prabha Udayakumar
- Leela Samson as Irene Dicotta
- Major Ravi as City Police Commissioner Ram Raghavan IPS (cameo)
- Sunil Sukhada as Music Store owner (cameo)
- Shine Tom Chacko as a hunter (cameo)
- Menaka as Uday's yesteryear co-star (cameo)

== Production ==
The success of Sriram Raghavan's Hindi film Andhadhun prompted regional film makers to remake the film in several Indian regional languages. The official announcement of the film being remade in Tamil as Andhagan, in Telugu as Maestro, and in Malayalam as Bhramam happened almost at the same time. AJ International signed actors Prithviraj Sukumaran, Mamta Mohandas, Raashii Khanna, Unni Mukundan and Shankar to do the roles of Ayushmann Khurrana, Tabu, Radhika Apte, Manav Vij and Anil Dhawan's roles respectively for the Malayalam version to be directed by cinematographer Ravi K. Chandran. It marks the second Malayalam film for Raashi Khanna after Villain (2017).

Principal photography began on 27 January 2021 with all cast joining the schedule. On 8 February, R. Rahul, an assistant director who was working on the film was found dead at his hotel room in Maradu in Kochi, Kerala. As per news reports, local police suspect suicide as he was found hanging. Principal photography wrapped in early March.

== Music ==
Bhramam

Soundtrack album by Jakes Bejoy
- Released: 2021
- Genre: Feature Film Soundtrack
- Length: 6:59
- Label: API Malayalam
- Producers: Viacom18 Studios; AP International

Jakes Bejoy chronology
Kuruthi (2021)	Bhramam (2021)	Salute (2022)

The music and background scores of the film is arranged by Jakes Bejoy. The song Munthiripoovo from the movie which was sung by Jakes Bejoy and penned by B.K.Harinaraynan was released on 22 September 2021.

=== Track listing ===
All music is composed by Jakes Bejoy.

No.	Title	Writer(s)	Performer(s)	Length
1.	"Munthiripoovo"	B. K. Harinarayanan	Jakes Bejoy	04.02
2.	"Lokam – Who Wants it"	Joe Paul	Prithviraj Sukumaran	02.57
Total length:				6:59

== Release ==
The film was released through Amazon Prime Video only in India and in theatres worldwide (except India) on 7 October 2021.

== Reception ==
Vishal Menon of Film Companion wrote, "Apart from the meta touches, the other way the film works for people who’ve seen the original is how it gets a lot of its casting right."
