= Vaashi (2022 film) =

2022 film by Vishnu G. Raghav

- Theatrical release poster
- Directed by: Vishnu G Raghav
- Written by: Vishnu G Raghav
- Story by: Janiz Chacko Simon
- Produced by: G. Suresh Kumar
- Starring: Tovino Thomas; Keerthy Suresh
- Cinematography: Neil D'Cunha
- Edited by: Arju Benn
- Music by: Kailas Menon
- Production company: Revathy Kalamandhir
- Distributed by: Urvasi Theatres; Remya Movies
- Release date: 17 June 2022
- Running time: 128 minutes
- Country: India
- Language: Malayalam
- Box office: ₹1.8 crore

Vaashi is a 2022 Indian Malayalam-language courtroom drama film written and directed by Vishnu G Raghav and produced by G. Suresh Kumar and co-produced by Menaka Suresh and Revathy Suresh. The film stars Tovino Thomas and Keerthy Suresh in the lead roles. The music is composed by Kailas Menon with cinematography by Neil D'Cunha and editing by Arju Benn. The film released theatrically on 17 June 2022.

== Plot ==
Advocates Ebin and Madhavi are colleagues who fall in love and get married. However, they find themselves on opposite sides of an IPC 375 case that also involves elements of IPC 417. Despite their personal feelings, they both fight the case with the intention of winning, which causes problems in their personal lives. Their mentor and friend, Adv. Mulloor reminds them not to mix personal and professional lives, and eventually, they take his advice and reconcile with each other. Unfortunately, Madhavi's side loses the case, and the victim experiences a form of Stockholm syndrome. Madhavi decides to challenge the case in High Court. Then, both Ebin and Madhavi struggle to accept the moral boundaries of their profession, but they decide to keep their professional and personal lives separate. They come to realize that their love is beyond the egos of the courtroom.

== Cast ==
- Tovino Thomas as Adv. Ebin Mathew
- Keerthy Suresh as Adv. Madhavi Mohan
- Anu Mohan as Gautham Ganesh
- Anagha Narayanan as Anusha Shivakumar
- Baiju Santhosh as Adv. Satheesh Mulloor
- Kottayam Ramesh as Judge Pillai
- G. Suresh Kumar as Mathew
- Nandu as Shivakumar
- Rony David as Jose
- Maya Menon
- Sreelakshmi as Madhavi's mother
- Geethi Sangeetha as Satheesh's wife
- Maya Viswanath
- Arya as Nandhitha
- Vanitha Krishnachandran as Ebin's mother
- Shobha Mohan as Magistrate
- RJ Raghu as Vimal
- Meera Nair PS as Elsy
- Amal Rajdev as Ganesh
- Vijaya Kumari as Ganesh's wife

== Production ==
Principal photography began on 17 November 2021 and filming was wrapped up on 19 January 2022.

== Release ==
=== Theatrical ===
The film was released in theatres on June 17, 2022.

=== Home media ===
The digital streaming rights of the film is acquired by Netflix from amount of ₹ 10 crores. The film started streaming on Netflix from 17 July 2022 in Malayalam and dubbed versions of Tamil, Telugu and Kannada languages.

== Music ==
Soundtrack of Vaashi is composed by Kailas Menon and lyrics by Vinayak Sasikumar. The music rights of the film are owned by Think Music.

=== Track list ===
No.	Title	Lyrics	Singer(s)	Length
1.	"Yaathonnum Parayathe"	Vinayak Sasikumar	Sithara, Abhijith Anilkumar	4:06
2.	"Rithuragam"	Vinayak Sasikumar	Keshav Vinod, Sruthy Sivadas	4:47
3.	"Hey Kanmani"	Vinayak Sasikumar	Abhijith Anilkumar, Greeshma Tharavath	3:51
Total length:				12:45

== Reception ==
=== Critical reception ===
Anjana George of The Times of India criticised the weak script, the lack of depth in Keerthy's character, the usage of conventions and stereotypes of women's identity in a patriarchal society and rated the film 2 out of 5 stars. She wrote: "The movie reveals that the film fraternity is yet to have an idea on relationships, consent, sex, abuse, assault and feminism. It's high time for male scribes who venture to feature complex female characters who contribute significantly to the story considering the market trend, to understand women, their thought on sex, life, love, marriage, feminism and companionship." Cris of The News Minute stated that the film's script, though well-paced, lacked depth. He also stated that the court scenes and dialogues were well paced, the film does not connect much with the audience to support either of the character lawyers or explore the outcome, and felt the film "is more a relationship drama than a thriller" and writing: "'Vaashi' is tightly packed and has some lovely performances." Goutham V. S. of The Indian Express wrote: "Vaashi is an engaging courtroom drama, with Tovino Thomas and Keerthy Suresh playing their roles convincingly." Princy Alexander of Onmanorama wrote: "Though the sound effects are jarring at times, the songs by Kailas Menon and written by Vinayak Sasikkumar are pleasing. Overall, 'Vaashi' leaves an impression on us, giving us some time to think about the case in point without forcing the subject upon the viewer."
