= Cheekkode =

Cikkode
- village
- Location in Kerala, India Cikkode (India)
- Coordinates: 11.2304300°N 75.98934°E
- Country: India
- State: Kerala
- District: Malappuram

Population (2011)
  - Total: 22,413

Languages
  - Official: Malayalam, English
- Time zone: UTC+5:30 (IST)
- PIN: 673645
- Vehicle registration: KL-

Cheekkode is a village in Malappuram district in the state of Kerala, India.

== Demographics ==
As of 2011 India census, Cheekkode had a population of 22,413, with 11,086 males and 11327 females.

== Transportation ==
Cheekode village connects to other parts of India through Feroke town on the west and Nilambur town on the east. National Highway No.66 passes through Feroke, and the northern stretch connects to Goa and Mumbai. The southern stretch connects to Cochin and Trivandrum. State Highway No.28 starts from Nilambur and connects to Ooty, Mysore, and Bangalore through Highways 12,29 and 181. The nearest airport and major railway station is at Kozhikode (Calicut).
