= Gauthami Nair =

Indian actress, film director

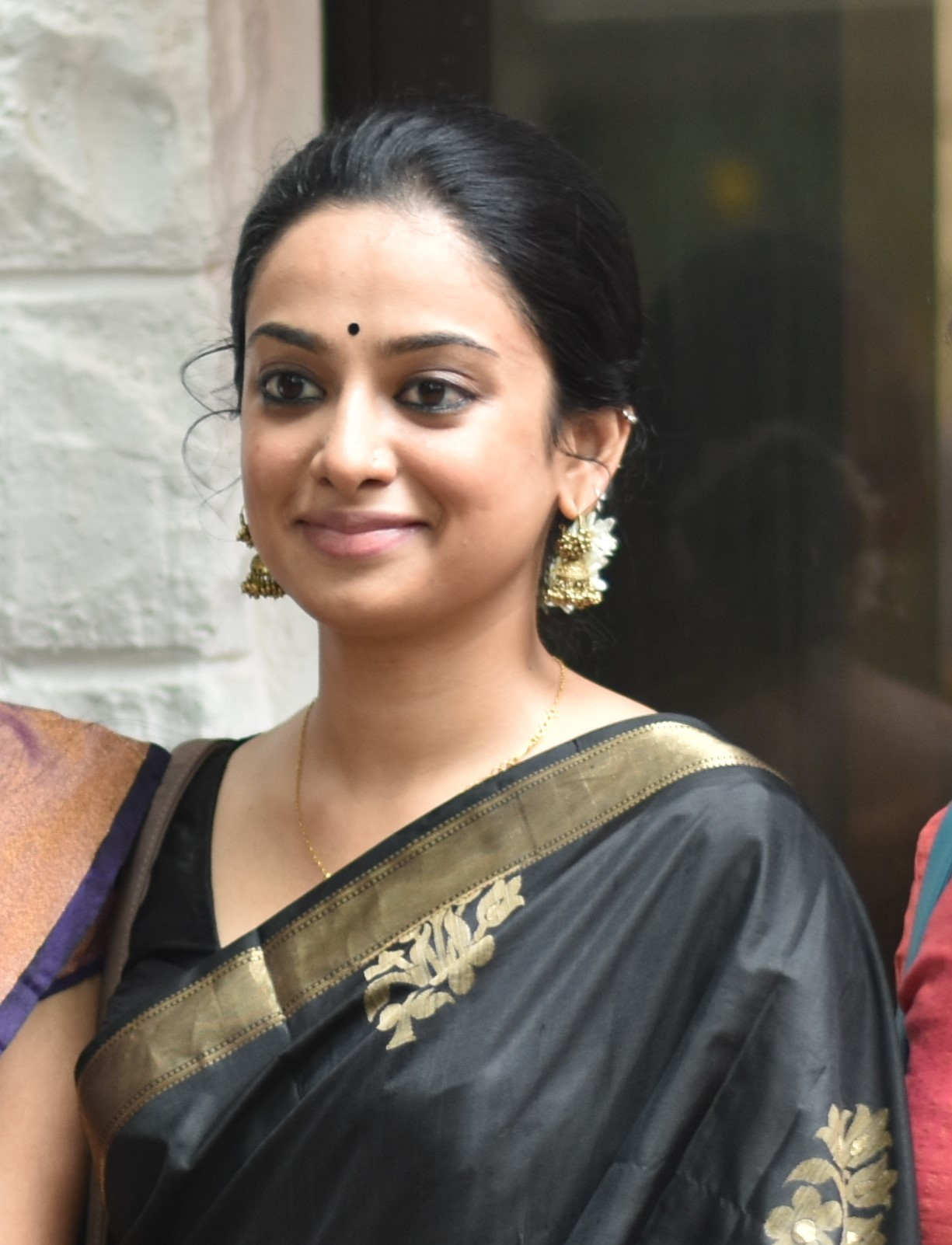
- Gauthami in 2019
- Born: Alappuzha, Kerala, India
- Education: Government College for Women, Thiruvananthapuram (MSc psychology)
- Occupations: Actress; film director
- Years active: 2012–present

Gauthami Nair is an Indian actress and director who is associated with Malayalam films. She made her silver screen debut in the 2012 film Second Show.

== Early life ==
Gauthami Nair was born to Madhu Nair and Sobha in Alappuzha. She has an elder sister, Gayathri.

She left her studies mid-way to pursue a career in films, but in 2012, she enrolled herself in a course in Psychology at the Government College for Women, Thiruvananthapuram. She went on to pursue masters at the same college and graduated with the second rank in the university exams.

== Career ==
She started her acting career by starring in the Malayalam film Second Show. Her second film was Diamond Necklace in Malayalam, in which she starred with Fahadh Faasil and Samvrutha Sunil as a nurse. Her role as a Tamil girl and the charisma with which she carried herself around even when everything around her was collapsing in the film was very much appreciated. Her next Malayalam film Chapters, was also well received.

== Personal life ==
She announced that she will marry someone working in the industry in March 2017 through online news portals, and married film-maker Srinath Rajendran on 2 April 2017. In 2023 she announced that they went separate ways after 3 years of marriage.

== Filmography ==
=== Films ===
Year	Title	Role	Ref.
2012	Second Show	Geethanjali Janardhanan	
2012	Diamond Necklace	Lakshmi	
2012	Chapters	Priya	
2014	Koothara	Roshni	
2016	Campus Diary	Krishnapriya	
2022	Meri Awaaz Suno	R. J. Pauly	
2023	2018	Anupama	
2024	Kondal	Ancy	

=== Other Works ===
Year	Title	Role	Notes	Ref.
2026	Kaakee Circus		Zee5 Original Web Series	
