= Tovino Thomas =

Indian actor and producer (born 1989)

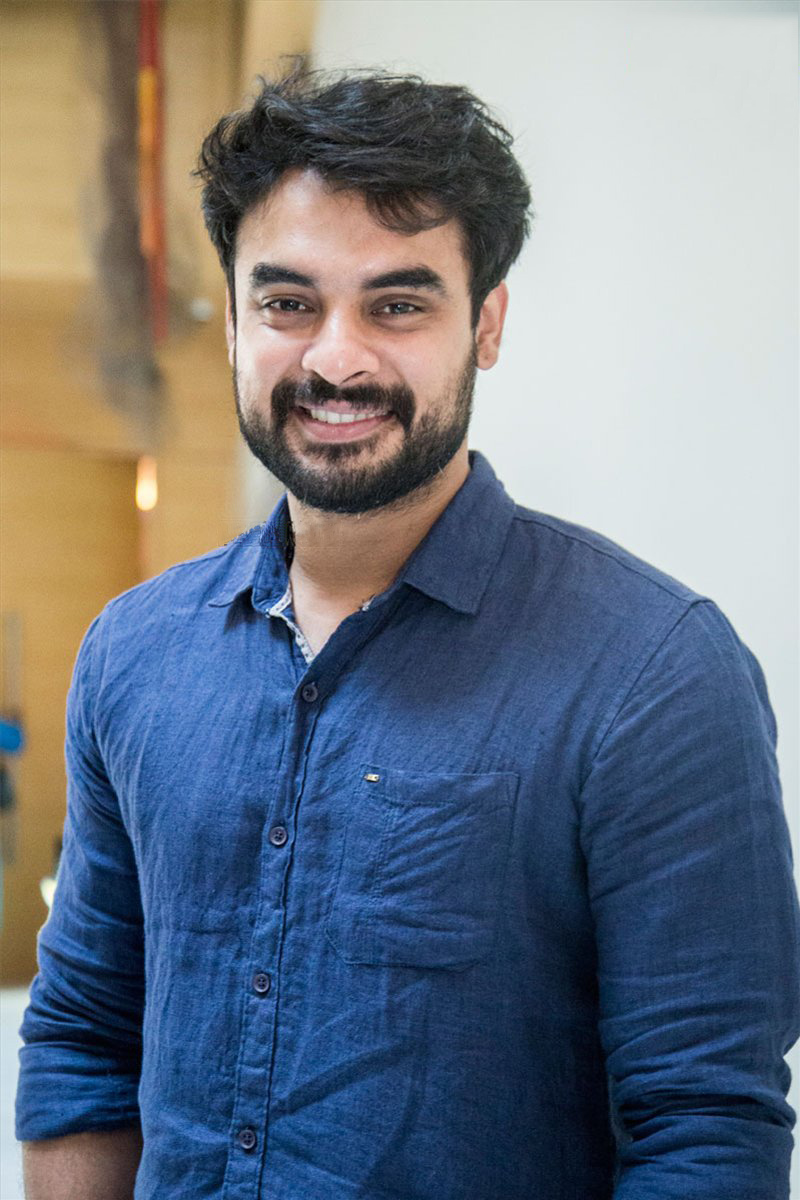
- Tovino in 2018
- Born: 21 January 1989 (age 37); Irinjalakuda, Thrissur district, Kerala
- Occupations: Actor; film producer
- Years active: 2012–present
- Spouse: Lidiya (m. 2014)
- Children: 2
- Website: tovinothomas.com

Tovino Thomas (born 21 January 1989) is an Indian actor and film producer who primarily works in Malayalam films. One of the leading Malayalam actors, he is a recipient of several accolades including one Kerala State Film Award, two Kerala Film Critics Association Awards and two Filmfare Awards.

Tovino made his debut in 2012 with the film Prabhuvinte Makkal. His breakthrough roles were in the films ABCD (2013), 7th Day (2014), Ennu Ninte Moideen (2015). He starred as the titular character in the Netflix superhero film Minnal Murali (2021). He won the Filmfare Award for Best Supporting Actor for his performance in Ennu Ninte Moideen (2015). He also won the Kerala Film Critics Association Award and the Filmfare Critics Award for Best Actor – Malayalam for his performance in Mayanadhi (2017). In 2022, Tovino won the SIIMA Award for Best Actor for Minnal Murali and Kala.

Tovino has co-produced the film Kilometers and Kilometers. On 21 January 2021, he launched his production house, Tovino Thomas Productions. The first venture by his production house became Kala.

== Early life and education ==
Tovino Thomas was born on 21 January 1989 at Irinjalakuda, Thrissur, to Sheela and Adv. E. Thomas of the Ellikkal house as the youngest child. His siblings are Tingston Thomas and Dhanya Thomas. He completed primary schooling from Don Bosco Higher Secondary School, Irinjalakuda, and Secondary (Plus Two) schooling from St. Mary's Higher Secondary School, Irinjalakuda, and then graduated with bachelor's degree in electronics and communication engineering from the Tamil Nadu College of Engineering, Coimbatore. He was a part of the handball team of Don Bosco High School and also served as the school leader. He later worked at Cognizant Technologies as a software engineer. He was quite active in sports, fitness, and modeling.

== Career ==
=== Debut and early work (2012-2014) ===
Tovino Thomas made his acting debut in Prabhuvinte Makkal (2012) directed by Sajeev Anthikkad. Subsequently, he worked as an assistant director in Roopesh Peethambaran's Theevram. In ABCD: American-Born Confused Desi (2013) he portrayed the role of the antagonist. Tovino played one of the leads in the film Koothara, which also featured Mohanlal. Again, he was cast in an important role in Roopesh Peethambaran's second directorial venture You Too Brutus.

He has played roles in the films including 7th Day (2014) and Charlie (2015).

=== Breakthrough and recognition (2015-2019) ===
In 2015, he portrayed the role of Perumparambil Appu in the film Ennu Ninte Moideen which was widely appreciated and received critical acclaim for his performance. He won his first Filmfare Award for Best Supporting Actor for his performance in Ennu Ninte Moideen.

He played the role of Engineer Thejus Varky in Guppy (2016) which was well received by audiences upon the DVD and digital release. He won the New Sensational Hero Award at the NAFA 2017 for his performance in the film.

He played the lead role in Oru Mexican Aparatha, Godha, and Mayanadi in 2017. He won the Filmfare Critics Award for Best Actor – Malayalam and Behindwoods Critics Award for Best Actor for Mayanadi. The film was praised for the way it tackled with sexuality and was included in The Hindu's top 25 Malayalam films of the decade. The same year he appeared in Ezra in a major supporting role.

In 2018, Tovino Thomas was cast in a major role in Maari 2 with Dhanush which was his Tamil debut. His major Malayalam releases for the year includes Theevandi, Ente Ummante Peru, and Oru Kuprasidha Payyan. Tovino had major roles in Lucifer, Uyare and Virus in 2019. His film Uyare was released in South Korea, becoming the first Malayalam film to do so. His other releases in the year were And the Oscar Goes To..., Luca, Kalki, and Edakkad Battalion 06.

=== Established actor (2020–present) ===
In 2020, he played the lead role in the crime thriller Forensic with Mamta Mohandas, which received a good response from the audience and was a major box office success.

In 2021, his first release was Kala which was his second venture as a producer. The film received critical acclaim for its narrative. Kaanekkaane released in 2021, received a positive response and critical acclaim for its narrative and performance by its cast. He starred as the titular character in Minnal Murali, which is the first Malayalam superhero action film, released by Netflix on 24 December. He received immense praise for his work in the film and the movie was also declared as 'Streaming success'. and surpassed the records of most viewed Malayalam Film on OTT previously held by Drishyam 2.

In 2022, Tovino appeared in Naaradan, Dear Friend, Vaashi, and Thallumaala. The latter film proved to be a commercial success.

In 2023, he starred in Neelavelicham, in which he portrayed the role of Vaikom Muhammad Basheer, that film was considered a flop and in 2018, which collected 176 crore and became the 4th Highest grossing Malayalam film ever.

In 2024, he starred in films like Anweshippin Kandethum, Nadikar and A.R.M.. The latter became Tovino's first solo 100 crore grosser.

In 2025, he starred in Identity which under performed significantly at the box office despite a high budget, followed by L2: Empuraan, where he reprised his role as Jathin Ramdas. He did a guest appearance in Basil Joseph starrer Maranamass, which was produced under his banner Tovino Thomas Productions. The same year, he played the role of a police officer in Anuraj Manohar's sophomore directorial Narivetta, which was based on the 2003 Muthanga incident and its aftermath. He played the role of Chathan(goblin) in an extended cameo in the Kalyani Priyadarshan starrer Lokah Chapter 1: Chandra, in which his performance gained praise.

His further films include Pallichattambi, directed by Dijo Jose Antony which was released in April 2026, Athiradi directed by Arun Anirudhan starring Basil Joseph and Vineeth Sreenivasan alongside him, as well as Lokah Chapter 2: Chathan directed by Dominic Arun, which is a direct sequel of the 2025 superhero action film blockbuster Lokah Chapter 1: Chandra.

== Media image ==
Tovino is considered among the highest-paid actors of Malayalam cinema. He stood at the 21st place on Forbes India's most influential stars on Instagram in South cinema for the year 2021. Tovino was named the Kochi Times Most Desirable Men in 2016 and 2018. He was also placed 2nd in 2019 and 5th in 2020. In 2022, Forbes India included him in its first ever "Showstoppers – India's Top 50 Outperformers" list.

== Philanthropy ==
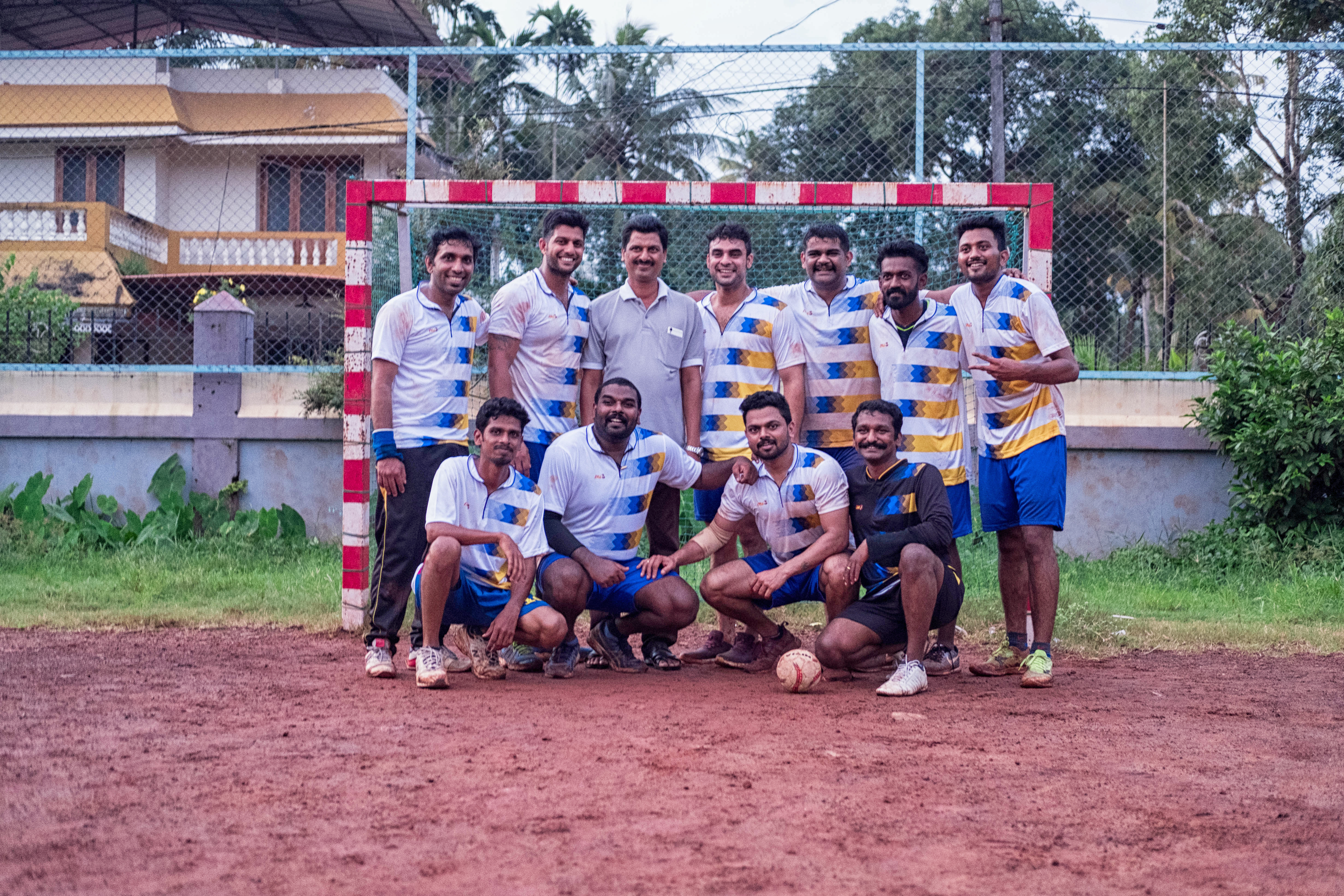
Tovino Thomas (fourth from the left) along Don Bosco Seniors Handball Team and Coach Giby V. Pereppadan

In 2021, Tovino is announced as the ambassador of the Samoohika Sannadhasena, the community volunteer program launched by the Government of Kerala. The community volunteer program was launched to tackle natural disasters by imparting training to volunteers and provide aid to the public in times of crisis. Pinarayi Vijayan, Chief Minister of Kerala appreciated Tovino's involvement in flood relief activities and noted that his presence will influence the youth to join in the community volunteer program.

Tovino had volunteered during 2018 Kerala floods to lead rescue and rehabilitation missions. In 2021, Tovino received golden visa from the Government of UAE.

After Mammootty and Mohanlal, Tovino became the third Malayalam film actor to receive the Golden Visa issued by the United Arab Emirates.

== Personal life ==
Tovino married his longtime girlfriend, Lidiya at St. Thomas Cathedral, Irinjalakuda, on 25 October 2014. The duo had met during their school days and married after nine years. The couple has a daughter and a son born in 2016 and 2020 respectively.

== Filmography ==
Key
†	Denotes films that have not yet been released

- All films are in Malayalam language unless otherwise noted.

=== As actor ===
Year	Title	Role	Notes	Ref
2012	Prabhuvinte Makkal	Che Guevara Sudheendran		
2013	ABCD	Akhilesh Varma		
2013	August Club	Mahesh		
2014	7th Day	Eby Ebineser		
2014	Koothara	Tharun		
2015	You Too Brutus	Tovino		
2015	Onnam Loka Mahayudham	Jacob		
2015	Ennu Ninte Moideen	Perumpparambil Appu		
2015	Charlie	Georgy	Guest appearance	
2016	Monsoon Mangoes	Sanjay		
2016	2 Penkuttikal	Sanju		
2016	Style	Edgar and Fletcher Kelly	Dual role	
2016	Guppy	Engineer Thejus Varkey		
2017	Ezra	Shafeer Ahammed		
2017	Oru Mexican Aparatha	Paul and Kochaniyan	Dual role	
2017	Godha	Anjaneya Das aka Dasan		
2017	Tharangam	G. Padmanabhan Pillai		
2017	Mayanadhi	Mathews aka Mathan		
2018	Aami	Lord Krishna		
2018	Naam	Himself	Cameo	
2018	Abhiyum Anuvum	Abhimanyu / Abhi	Tamil film	
2018	Maradona	Maradona		
2018	Theevandi	Bineesh Damodaran		
2018	Oru Kuprasidha Payyan	Ajayan		
2018	Ente Ummante Peru	Hameed and Khalid	25th film; Dual role	
2018	Maari 2	Gangadhar Beeja aka Thanatos	Tamil film	
2019	Lucifer	Jathin Ramdas		
2019	Uyare	Vishal Rajashekharan		
2019	Virus	Paul K Abraham		
2019	And the Oscar Goes To...	Issak Ebrahem		
2019	Luca	Luca		
2019	Kalki	K / Kalki		
2019	Edakkad Battalion 06	Shafeeque Mohammad		
2020	Forensic	Samuel John Kattookkaran		
2020	Kilometers and Kilometers	Josemon		
2021	Kala	Shaji		
2021	Kaanekkaane	Alan		
2021	Kurup	Charlie	Cameo appearance	
2021	Minnal Murali	Jaison Varghese / Minnal Murali and Martin Rangakala	Dual role	
2022	Naaradan	Chandraprakash		
2022	Dear Friend	Vinod		
2022	Vaashi	Ebin Mathew		
2022	Vazhakku	Siddharthan		
2022	Thallumaala	Manavalan Wazim "Wazi"		
2023	Neelavelicham	Vaikom M. Basheer		
2023	2018	Anoop		
2023	Adrishya Jalakangal	Unnamed young man		
2024	Anweshippin Kandethum	SI Anand Narayanan Pillai		
2024	Nadikar	David Padikkal		
2024	ARM	Ajayan, Maniyan & Kunjikelu	50th film; Triple role	
2025	Identity	Haran Shankar		
2025	L2: Empuraan	Jathin Ramdas		
2025	Maranamass	Puthanthottil Umesh	Cameo appearance; Also producer	
2025	Narivetta	Varghese Peter		
2025	Lokah Chapter 1: Chandra	Michael / Maathan	Dual role; Cameo appearance	
2026	Pallichattambi	Krishna Pillai / Pothan Christopher		
2026	Athiradi	Sreekuttan Vellayani		
2026	Balan: The Boy	Abbas		
2026	Khalifa: The Ruler	Iver Alexander	Cameo appearance	
2026	Scene	Victor	Cameo appearance; Tamil film	
2026	Bachelor Party D'eux	Musthafa	Extended Cameo	
2027	Gracias El Clasico †	TBA	Post-Production	
2027	Munpe †	TBA	Post-Production	
2027	Avaran †	TBA	Pre-Production	

=== Voice actor ===
Year	Title	Role	Notes
2026	Pennum Porattum	Suttu (voice)	

=== Music videos ===
Year	Title	Role	Language	Notes	Ref
2018	Ulaviravu	Tarun	Tamil	Ondraga Original	

=== As producer ===
Year	Title	Notes	Ref
2020	Kilometers and Kilometers		
2021	Kala		
2022	Vazhakku		
2023	Adrishya Jalakangal		
2025	Maranamass		

== Discography ==
Year	Film	Song	Notes	Ref
2022	Thallumaala	"Tupathu"	Co-sung with Shakthisree Gopalan and Vishnu Vijay	

== Awards and nominations ==
Tovino Thomas won the Best Asian Actor award at the Amsterdam-based Septimius Awards in 2023 for 2018, becoming the first South Indian actor to receive the honour, and won it a second time in 2025 for Narivetta. In 2024, he won the Best Actor award at the 44th Fantasporto International Film Festival in Portugal for Adrishya Jalakangal.

Year	Award	Category	Work	Result	Ref.
2015	Asiavision Awards	Best Supporting Actor	Ennu Ninte Moideen	Won	
2016	Asianet Film Awards	Best Supporting Actor	Ennu Ninte Moideen	Nominated	
2016	CPC Cine Awards	Best Character Actor	Ennu Ninte Moideen	Won	
2016	Filmfare Awards South	Best Supporting Actor – Malayalam	Ennu Ninte Moideen	Won	
2016	IIFA Utsavam	Best Supporting Actor – Malayalam	Ennu Ninte Moideen	Nominated	
2016	South Indian International Movie Awards	Best Supporting Actor – Malayalam	Ennu Ninte Moideen	Nominated	
2016	Asiavision Awards	Outstanding Performance of the Year	Guppy	Won	
2017	Asianet Film Awards	Best Supporting Actor	Guppy	Nominated	
2017	Filmfare Awards South	Best Supporting Actor – Malayalam	Guppy	Nominated	
2017	South Indian International Movie Awards	Best Supporting Actor – Malayalam	Guppy	Nominated	
2017	Asianet Comedy Awards	Youth Icon	Godha, Oru Mexican Aparatha	Won	
2017	Asiavision Awards	Man of the Year (Malayalam)	Godha, Oru Mexican Aparatha	Won	
2018	Asianet Film Awards	Performer of the Year	Various films	Won	
2018	Filmfare Awards South	Best Actor – Malayalam	Mayanadi	Nominated	
2018	Filmfare Awards South	Critics Best Actor – Malayalam	Mayanadi	Won	
2018	Flowers Indian Film Awards	Star of the Year	Mayanadi	Won	
2018	Kerala Film Critics Association Awards	Second Best Actor	Mayanadi	Won	
2018	South Indian International Movie Awards	Best Actor – Malayalam	Mayanadi	Nominated	
2018	Vanitha Film Awards	Most Romantic Hero	Mayanadi	Won	
2019	Asianet Film Awards	Performer of the Year	Various films	Won	
2019	Asianet Film Awards	Most Popular Actor	Various films	Nominated	
2019	Asiavision Awards	Best Actor – Malayalam	Mayanadi, Maradona, Theevandi, Oru Kuprasidha Payyan	Won	
2019	Filmfare Awards South	Best Actor – Malayalam	Various films	Nominated	
2019	Mazhavil Entertainment Awards	Best Actor	Various films	Won	
2019	South Indian International Movie Awards	Best Actor – Malayalam	Various films	Won	
2022	South Indian International Movie Awards	Best Actor – Malayalam	Minnal Murali	Won	
2023	Septimius Awards	Best Asian Actor	2018	Won	
2024	Fantasporto International Film Festival	Best Actor	Adrishya Jalakangal	Won	
2025	Septimius Awards	Best Asian Actor	Narivetta	Won	
2025	Kerala Film Critics Association Awards	Best Actor	ARM	Won	
2025	Kerala State Film Awards	Special Mention	ARM	Won	
