= Rima Kallingal =

Indian actress, dancer and film producer

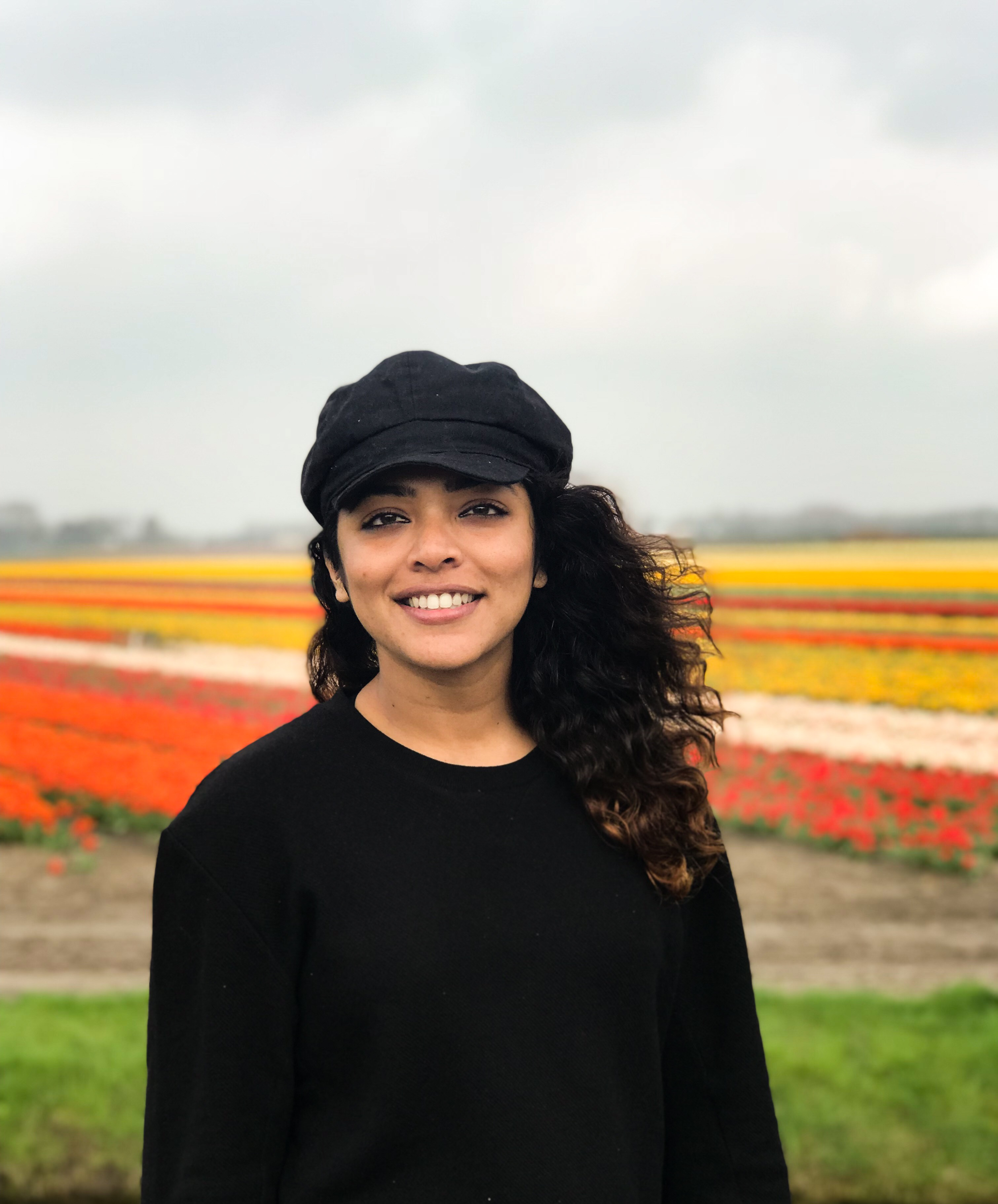
- Kallingal in 2018, photographed by Aashiq Abu
- Born: Rima Kallingal; 18 January 1984 (age 42); Thrissur, Kerala, India
- Education: Christ University (BA Journalism, 2001)
- Occupations: Actress; film producer; dancer; television host
- Years active: 2009–present
- Known for: 22 Female Kottayam (2012); Virus (2019); co-founding Women in Cinema Collective
- Spouse: Aashiq Abu (m. 2013)
- Parent(s): K. R. Rajan (father); Leenabhai (mother)
- Awards: Kerala State Film Award for Best Actress (2013); Filmfare Award for Best Actress – Malayalam (2013); Kerala Film Critics Association Award for Best Actress (2012, 2025)
- Website: rimakallingal (Instagram)

Rima Kallingal (born 18 January 1984) is an Indian actress, dancer, and film producer who primarily works in Malayalam cinema. Trained in dance from a young age, she participated in reality television before placing first runner-up in the Miss Kerala 2008 pageant, which led to her film debut in Ritu (2009). Her performance in 22 Female Kottayam (2012) earned her the Kerala State Film Award for Best Actress and the Filmfare Award for Best Actress – Malayalam. She is a co-founder of the Women in Cinema Collective (WCC), an organisation formed in 2017 to advocate for gender equity and safe working conditions in the Malayalam film industry.

== Early life and education ==
Born in Thrissur, Kerala, Kallingal began practising dance at age 3. She was born to K. R. Rajan and Leenabhai at the Ayyanthole Kallingal family home in Thrissur district. She studied at Stanes Anglo-Indian School in Coonoor up to class 5, and completed her schooling at Chinmaya Vidyalaya in Thrissur, graduating in 2001. She holds a bachelor's degree in Journalism from Christ University, Bengaluru.

She is also trained in Taekwondo, Chao (a Manipuri martial art), and Kalari. She joined the Bengaluru-based contemporary dance company Nritarutya after graduation and performed with the company on national and international stages before transitioning to acting.

She was a semi-finalist on the Asianet reality show Vodafone Thakadhimi, and later participated in the Miss Kerala 2008 beauty pageant, placing first runner-up to Shree Thulasi in a tie-breaker.

== Career ==
=== Acting ===
Director Lal Jose noticed Kallingal on a magazine cover and approached her for a goat herder role in the Tamil film Mazhai Varappoguthu. The project did not go ahead, but director Shyamaprasad subsequently cast her in the lead female role of Varsha in Ritu (2009), which marked her acting debut. In 2009 she also appeared in the anthology film Kerala Cafe, in the segment Mrityunjayam, and in Neelathaamara directed by Lal Jose.

In 2012, Kallingal was cast opposite Fahadh Faasil in 22 Female Kottayam, directed by Aashiq Abu, playing a nurse and rape survivor seeking justice. The film performed well commercially and won Kallingal the Kerala State Film Award for Best Actress and the Filmfare Award for Best Actress – Malayalam. The film also drew praise from critics; Sify wrote that Kallingal "poured her heart into her character" and delivered "a spectacular performance".

In 2013, she hosted the Mazhavil Manorama reality show Midukki, following which the Kerala Film Chamber imposed a temporary ban on her for disregarding a recent notice by the chamber; the ban was subsequently revoked. That same year she played a housewife in August Club. Paresh C. Palicha of Rediff.com noted that Kallingal portrayed a character "who has learnt to stifle her feelings and finding other ways to give them an outlet".

In 2015, she appeared alongside Manju Warrier in Rani Padmini, playing a disruptive North Indian woman on a road trip from Kerala to Shimla. The film was a commercial success and critic Deepa Soman described her performance as a "knockout".

In Virus (2019), directed by Aashiq Abu, Kallingal played nurse Akhila, a character based on Lini Puthussery — the nurse who died treating Kerala's first patient in the 2018 Nipah virus outbreak. Lini Puthussery's husband, who attended a screening of the film, said that Kallingal's portrayal was faithful and delivered "a flawless performance as Lini". Kallingal co-produced the film with Aashiq Abu under their production banner OPM Cinemas. Sowmya Rajendran described her performance as "expressive".

In the 2021 film Santhoshathinte Onnam Rahasyam, directed by Don Palathara, Kallingal played an entertainment journalist opposite Jitin Puthenchery. Baradwaj Rangan described her performance as "terrific". The film won her Best Actress at the Diorama International Film Festival.

In 2023 she appeared in Neelavelicham, a horror drama co-produced with Aashiq Abu.

In 2025, Kallingal starred in Theatre, written and directed by Sajin Baabu, playing Meera, a woman who has lived an isolated life on a coastal Kerala island alongside her elderly mother. The film explores the conflict between traditional belief and modern science. The film had its world premiere at the Eurasian Bridge International Film Festival in Yalta on 9 October 2025, before its theatrical release on 16 October 2025. The role was physically demanding; director Sajin Baabu noted that Kallingal spent several hours atop a coconut tree for a single scene and completed multiple retakes despite sustaining bruises. The film won Kallingal a joint Kerala Film Critics Association Award for Best Actress, shared with Nazriya Nazim.

=== Film production ===
Kallingal co-founded the production banner OPM Cinemas alongside her husband, director Aashiq Abu. The company has backed a range of films, including Maheshinte Prathikaaram (2016), directed by Dileesh Pothan, which was a significant commercial success. As a statement of commitment to workplace safety, Aashiq Abu announced that OPM Cinemas would establish an Internal Complaints Committee (ICC) for every film it produces — the first Malayalam film production company to make such a public commitment.

=== Dance ===
Alongside her screen career, Kallingal has maintained an active presence as a performer and choreographer. In 2014 she established Mamangam, a dance studio in Kochi, which closed in 2021 due to the COVID-19 pandemic. She subsequently reconstituted it as Mamangam Dance Company, which continues to produce and tour contemporary dance work.

In November 2023, Mamangam Dance Company presented its debut full-length contemporary dance production, Neythe — Dance of the Weaves, at the Fine Arts Society Hall, Kochi. The 35-minute work paid tribute to the handloom weavers of Chendamangalam and was inspired by the displacement of livelihoods after the 2018 Kerala floods. The production was staged at the International Theatre Festival of Kerala in Thrissur in March 2025.

Kallingal also created Nayika, a one-hour dance production tracing a century of women in Malayalam cinema, beginning with a tribute to P. K. Rosy, the industry's first actress.

== Women in Cinema Collective ==
In May 2017, following the sexual assault of a prominent Malayalam film actress in Kochi, Kallingal was among a group of women film professionals who petitioned the Chief Minister of Kerala and subsequently co-founded the Women in Cinema Collective (WCC). The WCC was formally registered as a society on 1 November 2017.

The WCC's petition to the government resulted in the formation of the Justice Hema Committee in 2018, tasked with studying the conditions faced by women in the Malayalam film industry. The committee submitted its report in December 2019; it was made public in August 2024 and documented systemic issues including gender-based discrimination, inadequate workplace safety, and the prevalence of power-based exploitation.

As a member of the Association of Malayalam Movie Artists (AMMA), Kallingal resigned in protest when the association reinstated a member accused in the 2017 assault case while the matter was still under judicial consideration. She was one of three WCC members — along with Geethu Mohandas and Remya Nambissan — to resign alongside the survivor herself.

Kallingal has spoken publicly about the personal and professional costs of the collective's advocacy. "We knew it would be tough, but we never imagined it would cost us personal relationships, careers and expose us to such intense social trolling," she told The Federal in 2024. A widely cited moment from this period was her display of the WCC's Avalkoppam ("With Her") solidarity banner following a dance performance at the state government's awards ceremony in 2018, which was met with sustained applause.

== Public image ==
Kallingal's roles in 22 Female Kottayam, August Club, and Rani Padmini are cited among the strongest female-led characters in Malayalam cinema. Kallingal was named the Kochi Times Most Desirable Woman in 2012.

== Personal life ==
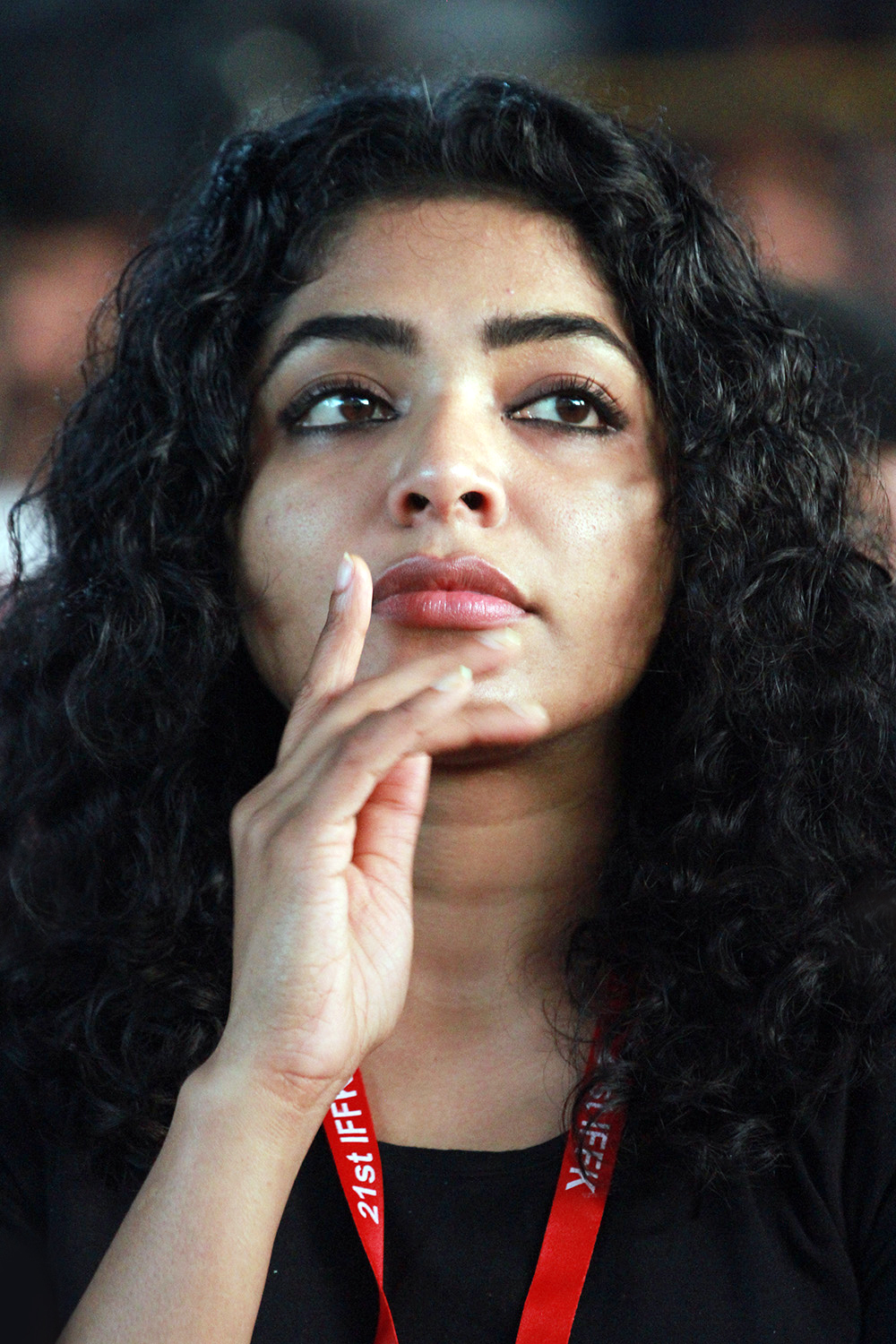
Kallingal in 2016

Kallingal married director Aashiq Abu on 1 November 2013, at the Kakkanad Registration Office, Kochi. Ahead of the ceremony, the couple donated ₹1 million towards the welfare of cancer patients at the General Hospital, Ernakulam, and ₹25,000 towards the dietary kitchen at the same hospital.

== Filmography ==
=== As actress ===
All projects are in Malayalam language unless noted.

Year	Title	Role	Notes
2009	Ritu	Varsha John	Malayalam debut
2009	Kerala Cafe	Grand daughter	Segment: Mrityunjayam
2009	Neelathaamara	Shaarath Ammini	
2010	Happy Husbands	Diana	
2010	Best of Luck	Diya	
2011	City of God	Surya Prabha	
2011	Ko	Herself	Tamil debut; special appearance
2011	Shankaranum Mohananum	Jyotsna Mathew	
2011	Yuvan Yuvathi	Nisha	Tamil film
2011	Sevenes	Aravindan's sister	
2011	Doubles	Seetha Lakshmi	Cameo appearance
2011	Indian Rupee	Beena	
2012	Orkut Oru Ormakoot	Crystal Falth Ritz	
2012	Unnam	Jennifer	
2012	Nidra	Ashwathy	
2012	22 Female Kottayam	Tessa Kurissuparambil Abraham	
2012	Husbands in Goa	Teena	
2012	Ayalum Njanum Thammil	Diya	
2012	Bavuttiyude Namathil	Noorjahan	
2013	Proprietors: Kammath & Kammath	Mahalakshmi	
2013	Natholi Oru Cheriya Meenalla	Annie	
2013	August Club	Savithri	
2013	Zachariayude Garbhinikal	Fathima	
2013	Escape from Uganda	Shikha Samuel	
2013	Ezhu Sundara Rathrikal	Sini Alex	
2015	Chirakodinja Kinavukal	Sumathi	
2015	Rani Padmini	Rani	
2017	Kaadu Pookkunna Neram	Maoist	
2017	Clint	Chinnamma	
2018	Aabhaasam	Passenger	
2019	Virus	Nurse Akhila	Also co-producer
2021	Santhoshathinte Onnam Rahasyam	Maria	
2021	Chithirai Sevvaanam	Asha Nair	Tamil film
2023	Neelavelicham	Bhargavi	Also co-producer
2025	Theatre	Meera	

=== As producer ===
Year	Title	Director	Notes
2014	Gangster	Aashiq Abu	Associate producer
2016	Maheshinte Prathikaaram	Dileesh Pothan	Associate producer
2017	Mayanadi	Aashiq Abu	Associate producer
2018	Ee.Ma.Yau.	Lijo Jose Pellissery	Associate producer
2019	Virus	Aashiq Abu	Co-produced with Aashiq Abu under OPM Cinemas
2021	Bheemante Vazhi	Ashraf Hamza	Co-produced with Chemban Vinod Jose and Aashiq Abu
2022	Naradan	Aashiq Abu	Co-produced with Santhosh T. Kuruvilla and Aashiq Abu
2023	Neelavelicham	Aashiq Abu	Co-produced with Aashiq Abu

=== Television ===
Year	Program	Role	Channel	Notes
2013	Midukki	Host	Mazhavil Manorama	Reality show

=== Web series ===
Year	Title	Role	Language	Notes	Ref.
2021	Zindagi in Short	Dr. Kavya Menon	Hindi	Segment: "Sunny Side Upar"	
2025	Yuva Sapnon Ka Safar	Kanya	Multilingual (mainly English)	Segment: Backstage	

=== Short film ===
Year	Title	Role	Language	Ref.
2022	Lalanna's Song	Miriam	Malayalam	

== Accolades ==
Year	Award	Category	Film	Result	Ref.
2012	Kerala Film Critics Association Award for Best Actress	Best Actress	Indian Rupee	Won	
2013	Kerala State Film Award for Best Actress	Best Actress	22 Female Kottayam	Won	
2013	Filmfare Award for Best Actress – Malayalam	Best Actress – Malayalam	22 Female Kottayam	Won	
2013	SIIMA Critics Award for Best Actress – Malayalam	Critics Award – Best Actress – Malayalam	22 Female Kottayam	Won	
2013	Vanitha Film Awards	Best Actress	22 Female Kottayam	Won	
2016	Vanitha Film Awards	Special Performance – Actress	Rani Padmini	Won	
2021	Diorama International Film Festival	Best Actress	Santhoshathinte Onnam Rahasyam	Won	
2021	Vanitha Film Awards	Best Social Responsible Actress	Virus	Won	
2025	Kerala Film Critics Association Award for Best Actress	Best Actress (joint)	Theatre	Won	
