= Eravathur =

- Village
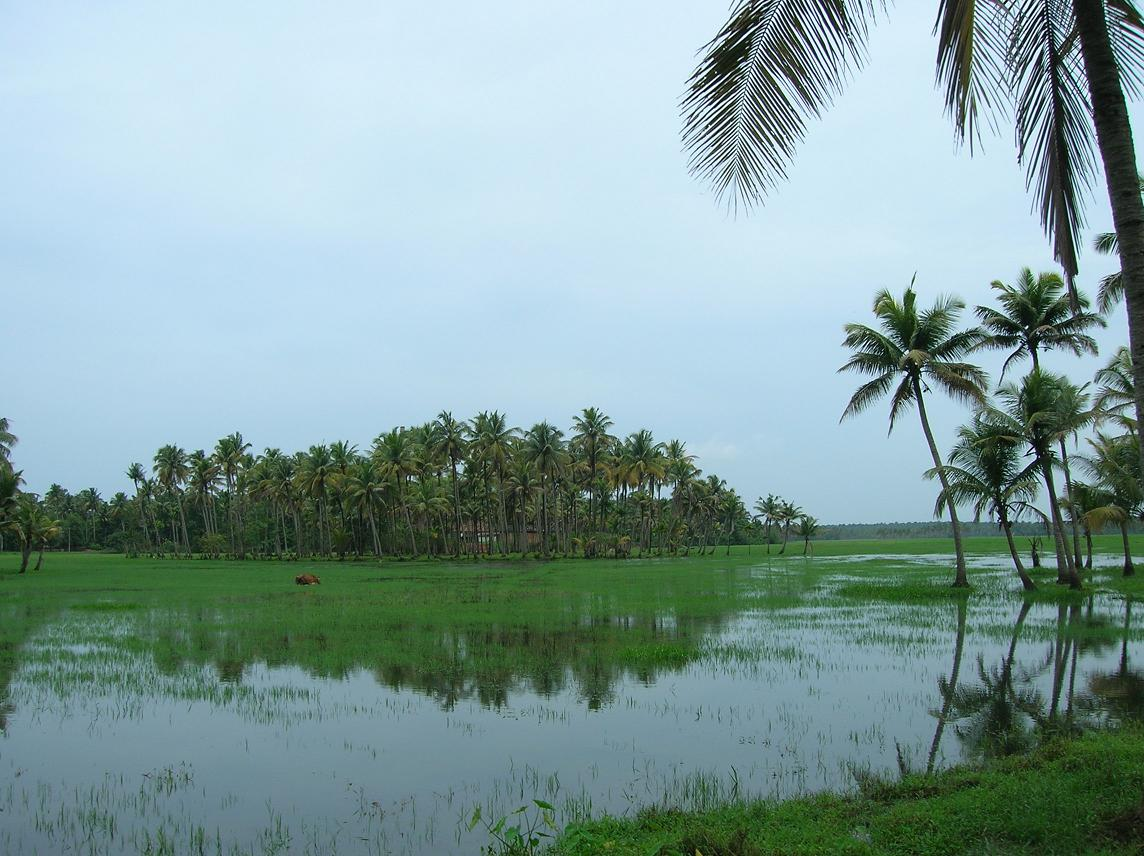

- Location in Kerala, India Eravathur (India)
- Coordinates: 10.200635°N 76.304479°E
- Country: India
- State: Kerala
- District: Thrissur

Languages
  - Official: Malayalam, English
- Time zone: UTC+5:30 (IST)
- PIN: 680734

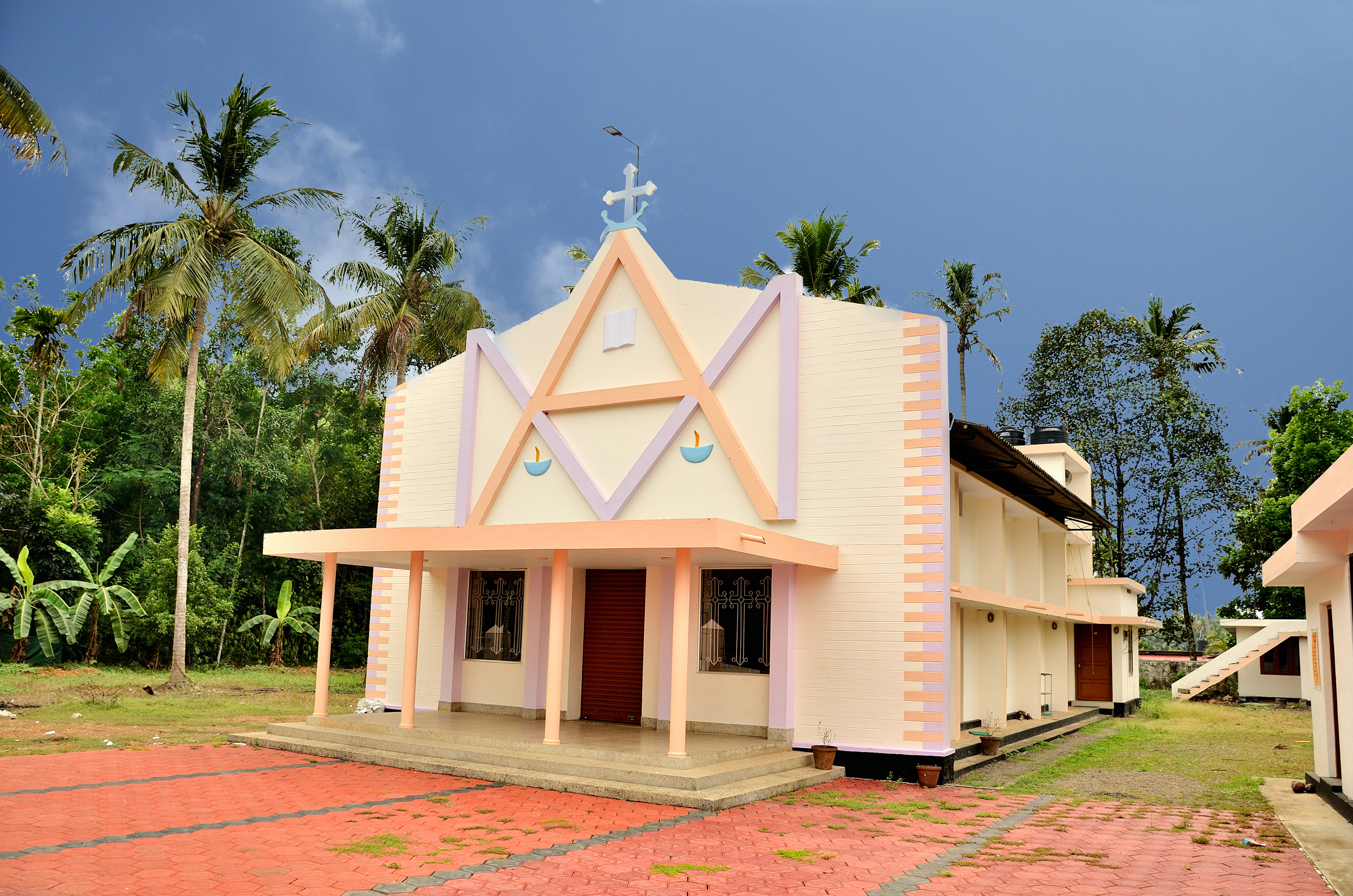
Mariyan Thuruth, Arogyamatha Shrine Church

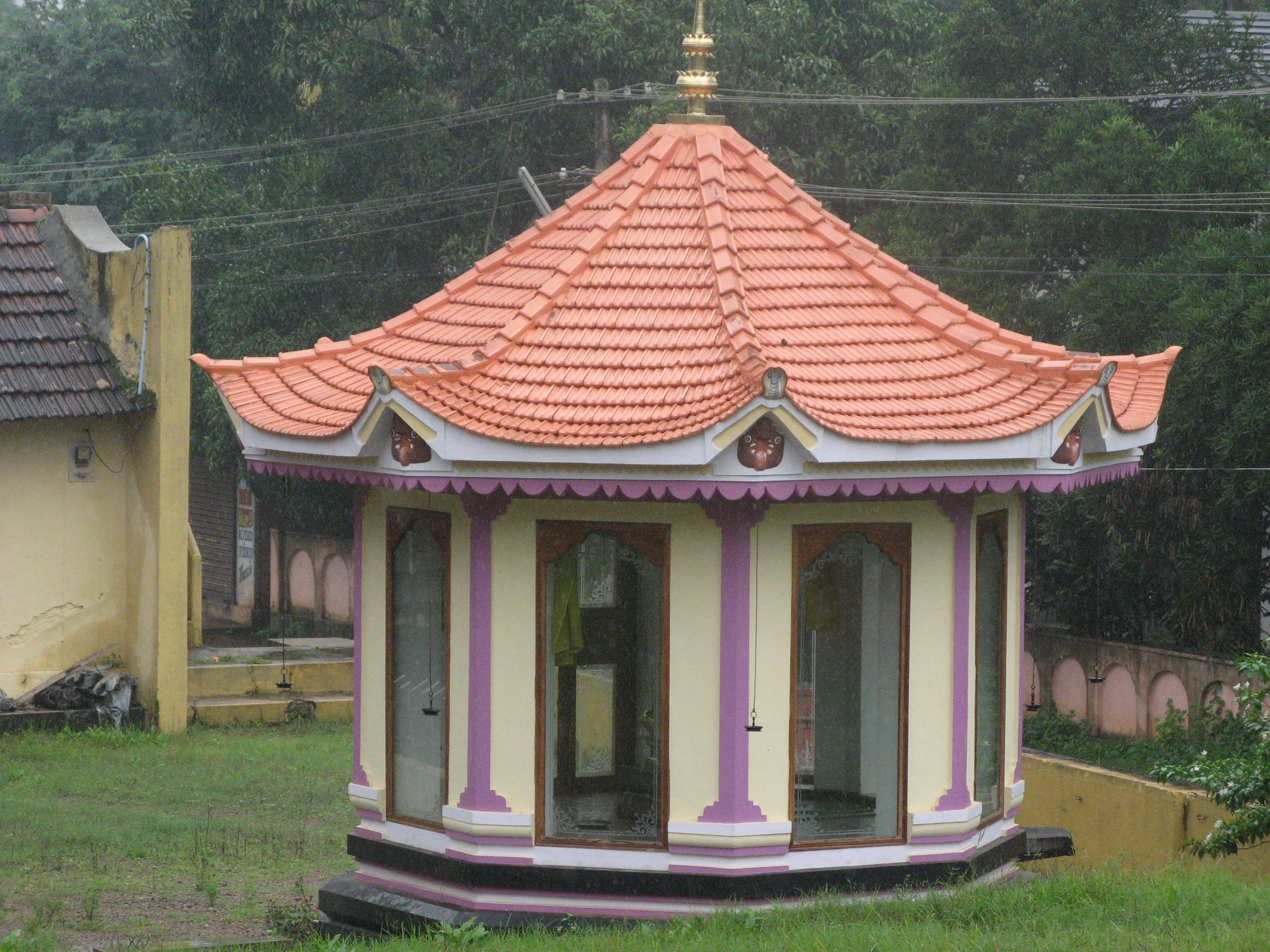
Purappilly Sthoopam

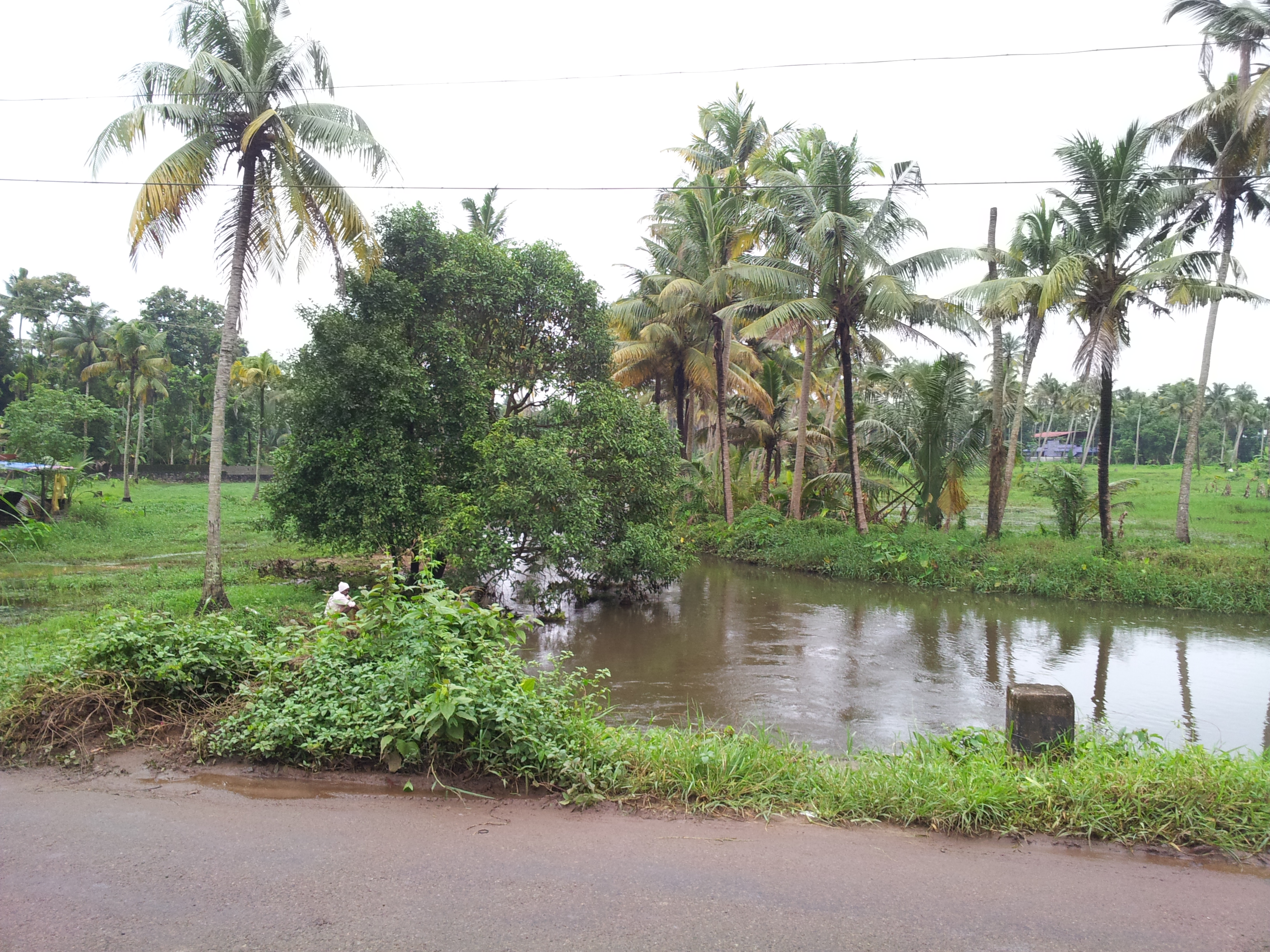
Village Landscape

Eravathur is a small village situated towards the south end of Thrissur district of Kerala state in India. This village is situated nearly 40 km (25 mi) away from Ernakulam city and nearly 45 km (28 mi) from Thrissur city.

== Transport ==
The nearest railway stations are Chalakudy and Angamaly.

The nearest bus stations are at Chalakudy, Mala, and Aluwaye.

The nearest airport is Cochin International Airport.

== Temples & Churches ==
- Thalayakkulam Bhagavathy Kshethram
- Purappillikkavu Bhagavathy Kshethram
- Mary Immaculate Church Kuzhur
- Mary Immaculate Church Eravathoor

== Schools ==
- Eravathur SKVLP School

=== Nearby schools ===
- Govt. Schools Kuzhur.
- S.N.D.P HSS Palissery School

== Nearby villages ==
- Kuzhur
- ValiyaParambu
- Poovathussery
- KochuKadavu
- Kurumassery
