= Divya Gopinath =

Indian actress

- Born: Eloor, Kochi, India
- Education: St. Xavier's College for Women, Aluva
- Occupation: Actress
- Spouse: Jubith Namradath
- Parent(s): K. N. Gopinath (father); C.P. Ushadevi (mother)

Divya Gopinath is an Indian actress who works in Malayalam films. She made her debut in the film Kammatipaadam (2016). She has since played roles in films such as Ayaal Sassi (2017), Virus (2019), and Anjaam Pathiraa (2020).

== Personal life ==
Divya was born in Eloor, Kochi. She has attended Thrissur School of Drama and Fine Arts and has a Master of Commerce from St. Xavier's College for Women, Aluva. She is married to director Jubith Namradath. She is also a member of Women in Cinema Collective.

Divya was allegedly sexually assaulted by actor Alencier Ley Lopez on the set of Aabhaasam.

== Filmography ==
Year	Title	Role	Notes
2016	Kammatipaadam	Paranki Majeed's wife	
2017	Ayaal Sassi	Sreelatha	
2018	Aabhaasam	The Muslim bride	
2019	Virus	Geetha	
2020	Anjaam Pathiraa	SI Preethi Pothuval	
2022	Village Cricket Boy	Mother	Short film
2022	19(1)(a)	Manager	
2023	Thuramukham		
