= French Viplavam =

- Directed by: Maju
- Screenplay by: Anwar Ali & Shajeer Jaleel
- Story by: Anwar Ali & Shajeer Jaleel
- Produced by: Shajeer Jaleel & Jafar Khan
- Starring: Sunny Wayne; Lal; Chemban Vinod Jose; Sasi Kalinga; Arya Salim; Lukman; Noby Marcose; Unnimaya Prasad; V. Suresh Thampanoor; Pauly Valsan
- Cinematography: Pappinu
- Edited by: Deepu Joseph
- Music by: Prashant Pillai
- Release date: 26 October 2018
- Country: India
- Language: Malayalam

French Viplavam is a Malayalam comedy movie, which marks the directorial debut of Maju, starring Sunny Wayne, Lal, Chemban Vinod Jose, and Arya Salim. It was released on 26 October 2018.

The film received negative reviews from critics.

== Plot ==
The film revolves around an innocent bunch in a tranquil village known as KochuKadavu കൊച്ചുകടവ്. It is set in 1996 after the arrack ban in Kerala. The scenes are based on the escapades of a few characters who are constantly desperate for a drink.

Patta Sisupalan owned an arrack shop, which he had to close down due to the ban. Satyan is a youth fooling around with his gang of friends and is in love with Sisupalan's daughter.

The story goes along without any definite direction until a twist happens with a foreign lady's arrival with a bottle of French wine.

== Cast ==
- Sunny Wayne as Satyan
- Lal as Patta Sisupalan
- Chemban Vinod Jose as Chattotty
- Sasi Kalinga
- Arya Salim
- Lukman Avaran
- Noby Marcose
- Unnimaya Prasad as Patta's wife
- V. Suresh Thampanoor
- Pauly Valsan
- Davinchi Santhosh

== Music ==
The film music was composed by Prashant Pillai.

Track listing
No.	Title	Singer(s)	Length
1.	"Mullu Mullu Mullu"	Sunny Wayne, Arya Salim	02:59

== Reception ==
The Times of India gave it a positive review, rating it 3.5 out of 5.

A review from New Indian Express wrote: "With a half-baked script, the effort is to bring in laughs with comical situations and one liners."
