= Sajin Baabu =

Indian film director, screenwriter, and producer

- Born: 1 June 1986 (age 40); Thiruvananthapuram, Kerala, India
- Occupations: Film director; screenwriter; producer
- Years active: 2014–present

Sajin Baabu (born 1 June 1986) is a national and international award-winning Indian film director, screenwriter, and producer, who works in Malayalam cinema. He made his directional debut with Unto the Dusk (or Asthamayam Vare ) in 2014. He is noted for his 2019 movie Biriyaani which bagged numerous awards, including the NETPAC award for best film at ASIATICA, Rome, Italy. He is the winner of Special Jury mention for his movie Biriyaani at the 67th National Film Awards which continues to be screened in various film festivals even now. His latest movie Theatre - The Myth of Reality which released on October 16 has opened to rave reviews and earned praise for its astute story telling and commendable performances.

== Personal life ==
Sajin Baabu was born in a remote village called Koopu in Thiruvananthapuram.

== Filmography ==
Year	Title	contribution	Festivals/ Awards/ Notes
2010	The Delegate	Director	docu-fiction that captures soul and essence of the IFFK.
2011	Music of the broom	Director	
2011	A river flowing deep and wide	Director	
2014	Unto the Dusk	Director, Scriptwriter	World premiere at Mumbai International Film Festival India Gold Competition Section in 2014; Rajathachakoram and the Certificate of Merit for Promotion at IFFK,2014.; Chitrbharathi award for Best Indian Film at Bengaluru International Film festival ,2014
2016	Ayaal Sassi	Director, Scriptwriter	Theatrical release starring the veteran Malayalam actor Srinivasan in a quirky role.
2020	Biriyaani	Director, Scriptwriter, Sound designer	42nd Moscow International Film Festival; NETPAC award at the 20th Asiatica Film Festival in Rome; 44th Kerala Film Critics Award for best screenplay; Special Jury Award for Best Film in the 12th Bengaluru International Film Festival (BIFFES); Best Film in the 6th Caleidoscope Indian Film Festival, Boston; Kani Kusruti won: Kerala State Film Award for Best Actress in 2020, BRICS Best Actress Award at the 42nd Moscow International Film Festival, Critics Award for Best Actress at 67th Filmfare India Awards South, Best second actress award at the Imagine India International Film Festival, Best actress in the 6th Caleidoscope Indian Film Festival, Boston; Features Jury Honorable Mention at IFFLA, Indian Film Festival, Los Angeles; 15th Jogja NETPAC Asian Film Festival, Indonesia; Screened at more than 100 film festivals across the world including: 42nd Moscow International Film Festival - Official Selection; 15th Jogja NETPAC Asian Film Festival, Indonesia; International Film Festival of Kerala - Official Selection; Bangalore International Film Festival - Official Selection; IFFLA, Indian Film Festival, Los Angeles -Official Competition; Tiburon International Film Festival, California, USA - Official Competition; Toulouse Indian Film Festival, France - Official Competition; Caleidoscope Indian International Film Festival, Boston - Official Competition; Imagine India Film Festival, Spain - Official Competition; Nepal International Film Festival - Official Competition; Melbourne Indian Film Festival - Official Competition; Indo German Film Week, Berlin- Official Selection; Yellowstone International film festival- Official selection; New York Indian Film Festival; Regina International Film Festival, Canada; Independent Film festival of Chennai; Soorya Film festival; NFDC Film Bazar Recommends - Official Selection; FIPRESCI India 20 best Films of 2020- Official selection; Indie Meme Film FestivaL
2025	Theatre - The Myth of Reality	Director, Scriptwriter, Sound designer	Premiered at the IX Yalta Film Festival Eurasian Bridge under International Competition Section; Rima Kallingal won the Kerala Film Critics Association Awards 2024 for Best Actress.; Pramod Veliyanad won Special Jury Award for Excellence in Acting at Kerala Film Critics Association Awards 2024; Official Selection for screening at Kazan, Russia as part of the TIME: Tatarstan–India Mutual Efficiency Business Forum's cultural programme; Selected for the CinévSpotlight Section curated by Cinevesture at Chandigarh Film Market
