= Livin C. Lonakutty =

Indian Sign Language interpreter, Screenwriter

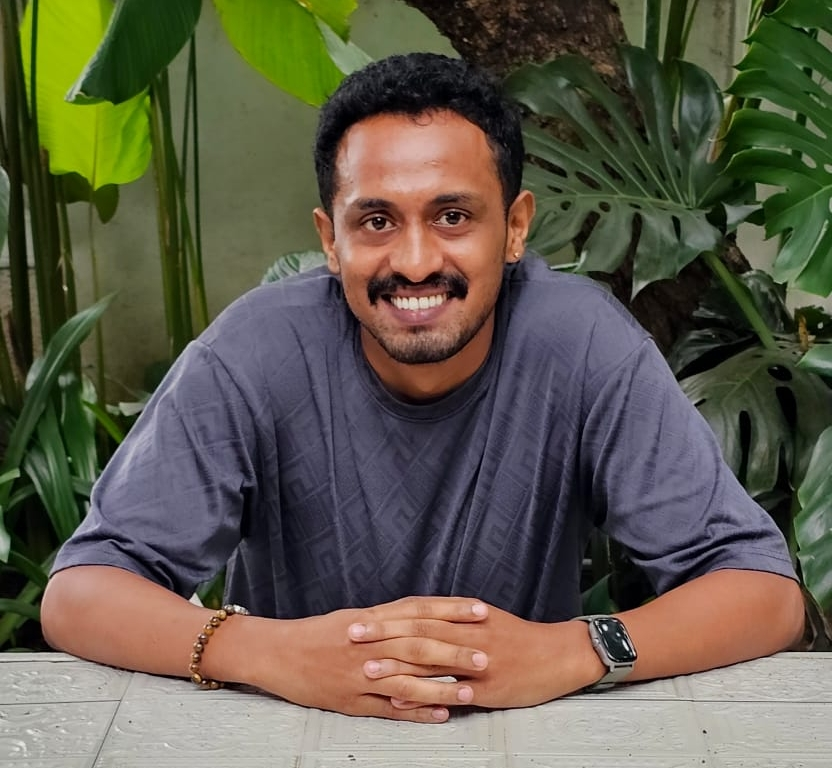
- Born: Thrissur
- Occupations: Sign language interpreter,Screenwriter

Livin C. L. ,better known by his name Livin C. Lonakutty ,is an Indian Sign language interpreter and screenwriter in the Malayalam film industry. He won the Kerala State Television Award for Best Children's Film 2022 for short film Village Cricket Boy.

== Early life and career ==
Livin was born in Thrissur district.He first started writing scripts for short films. He completed B.A English and History and Diploma in Indian Sign Language and MSW from Tamil Nadu Open University. Livin's interpretation work has taken him to various states of India, bridging the communication gaps of the deaf community. He Also worked as a Sign language trainer for the movie Sufiyum Sujatayum and currently working as a Reporter TV Sign language news reader.

== Filmography ==
Key
†	Denotes film or TV productions that have not yet been released

Year	Title	Role	notes
2017	Oru Ottam Poyalo	Screenwriter	short film
2019	Raghavan	Screenwriter	short film
2020	Sufiyum Sujatayum	Sign language trainer	trained Aditi Rao Hydari
2022	Village Cricket Boy	Screenwriter	short film
