= Udayon =

- Theatrical release poster
- Directed by: Bhadran
- Written by: Bhadran
- Produced by: Maha Subair
- Starring: Mohanlal; Laya; Salim Ghouse; Kalabhavan Mani; Manoj K. Jayan; Innocent; Nassar; Jagathy Sreekumar
- Cinematography: Ramachandra Babu
- Edited by: Ranjan Abraham
- Music by: Ouseppachan
- Production company: Varnachithra Big Screen
- Distributed by: Varnachithra Release
- Release date: 15 July 2005
- Running time: 157 minutes
- Country: India
- Language: Malayalam

Udayon (transl. Owner/Overlord) is a 2005 Indian Malayalam-language action-comedy film written and directed by Bhadran and produced by Maha Subair. It stars Mohanlal in dual roles: 75-year-old farmer Suranadu Kunju and his happy-go-lucky son Papoyi, Laya plays the female lead role and also features Salim Ghouse, Manoj K. Jayan, Kalabhavan Mani, Innocent, Jagathy Sreekumar and Siddique in substantial roles. The film features original soundtrack composed by Ouseppachan.

== Plot ==
The story revolves around a 75-year-old father Shooranadu Kunju and his son Papoyi. Kunju thinks that the heartbeat of the earth is in soil (Agriculture) and not in any other vocation. His beliefs on land and agrarianism are good, but his value system that farmers and farming are more important and better than anything else is preposterous. He denies his sons the opportunity to pursue their interests and wants them to be successful in agriculture, which leads to frequent sarcastic quarrels between Kunju and his three sons. Also, when he decides to marry off his daughter to an odd looking but farming enthusiast instead of an educated, handsome doctor makes them feel that the father is destroying and spoiling their lives with his ideals, stubbornness and high handedness.

Kunju had swindled a large portion of land (5 Acres) - which should have been inherited by his sister Eechamma by discreetly altering his Father's Will with the assistance of the family lawyer. The deceit is revealed to Eechamma years later by a severely ailing and remorseful Mullassery Sreedharan, the family lawyer. Eechamma decides to get back her rightful share through a proper legal channel as she is in a tight financial situation compared to Kunju. Eighteen years ago, Eecha's husband (A toddy shop owner) had committed suicide due to a dire financial crisis, after beseechingly requesting Kunju for help, which the latter denied owing to his miserly behaviour.

Mathan, Eecha's second son - known as JCB for owning and operating a bulldozer for his livelihood and brother-in-law Mundaparitha Perumal, a local Tamil village chieftain and an arbitrator, adds a twist as he interferes in the family property dispute. However, Eecha doesn't wish harm upon her brother, and her younger son Pottan Pathru, a speech impaired, also shares her sentiments. Papoyi tries to resolve things but his attempts are unsuccessful. Ultimately, Kunju's youngest son Ponnan is used as bait to coerce the transfer of property. Amidst the chaos, Ponnan is killed and in revenge Kunju kills Perumal and gives the family property keys to Eecha and the patriarch stick to Papoyi after being arrested and taken to the prison. While leaving his house with the Police, Kunju, who is now an impassive individual wails loudly, repenting his misdeeds.

== Cast ==
- Mohanlal in a dual role as:
  - Shooranadu Kunju alias Kunji Pappan (Father)
  - Shooranadu Papoyi (Younger Son)
- Laya as Maya, Papoyi's classmate and love interest
- Salim Ghouse as Mundaparitha Perumal
- Kalabhavan Mani as Mathan, Ichamma's younger son
- Manoj K. Jayan as Pottan Pathru, Ichamma's youngest son
- Innocent as Shooranadu Rarichan, Kunju's elder son
- Nassar as Unni Vaidyan, Kunju's best friend and Maya's uncle
- Bindu Panicker as Ichamma
- Rekha as Nangeli
- Sukanya as Susiemol, Kunju's only daughter and Pappoi's younger sister
- Ambika Mohan as Leelamma, Rarichan's wife
- Adarsh as Ponnan, Kunju's Grandson and Susiemol's son (voice dubbed by Kalidas Jayaram)
- Jagathy Sreekumar as Shavappetty Thoma, Ichamma's elder son
- Siddique as Mammali, Papoyi's best friend
- Cuckoo Parameswaran as Malli
- Shammi Thilakan as SI Itti
- Bheeman Raghu as CI Illikadan
- Mohan Jose as Manthodi Joppan
- Sadiq as Mathai, Papoyi's friend
- Kulappulli Leela as Bullet Kuttiyamma
- Rajan P. Dev as Chetti
- M. R. Gopakumar as Chackochi, Ichamma's husband
- Idavela Babu as Shooranadu Itti, Kunju's third son
- V. K. Sreeraman as Advocate Sreedharan
- Kochu Preman as Kangaroo, Bus conductor
- Vinayakan as Thoma's helper
- Valsala Menon as Karthyayani Amma
- Kalpana as Kunjuamma
- Unnikrishnan Namboothiri as Priest
- Baby Akshai as Kuku Paremeswaran's son
- Vinod Therattil as Person helping Papoyi during the bus accident
- Baiju Ezhupunna as Koothattukulam Mathai a Tipper Lorry Driver

== Production ==
Jyothika was offered to act as lead actress with Mohanlal. But she could not do it due to her busy schedules in Tamil. She was later replaced by Telugu actress Laya.

== Soundtrack ==
The film features original soundtrack composed by Ouseppachan.

=== Track listing ===
No.	Title	Lyrics	Singer(s)	Length
1.	"Angethala"	Kaithapram	Shankar Mahadevan, Mohanlal, Kalidas Jayaram	4:59
2.	"Chiri Chirichal"	Gireesh Puthenchery	Anwar Sadath, Gang	4:36
3.	"Pathinettam Patta"	Arumughan Vengat	Ouseppachan	1:24
4.	"Poondankila"	Arumughan Vengat	Pushpa Anand, Alex	3:24
5.	"Puthumannu"	Gireesh Puthanchery	Ouseppachan	2:03
6.	"Thiruvarangil"	Kaithapram	Madhu Balakrishnan	6:02
7.	"Thiruvarangil"	Kaithapram	K. S. Chithra	6:02

== Release ==
The film was released on 15 July 2005, and became an average in the box office, also getting mixed reviews from the critics. Most of them criticized the complicated plot but Mohanlal's performance as the crafty, tough bordering on villain, Shooranad Kunju was well praised. The Times of India mentioned Mohanlal's appearance as the old but toughened Soornadu Kunju perfectly suits his character. The actor's makeover as a grumpy old farmer is convincing. Mohanlal is spotted with a white moustache and a fake tooth stained with tobacco which is apt for his role of that of an old-fashioned conservative farmer. WebIndia123 called the film "a must see for Mohanlal fans".
