= Unto the Dusk =

- Theatrical release poster
- Directed by: Sajin Baabu
- Screenplay by: Jose John; Sajin Baabu
- Story by: Jose John; Sajin Baabu
- Produced by: M.P. Sheeja; L. Geetha
- Starring: Prakruthi Dutta Mukheri; Shilpa Kavalam; Sanal Aman; Joseph Mapilacherry; Shakkir; Lijo Jose Pallissery
- Cinematography: Karthik Muthukumar
- Edited by: Karthik Jogesh, Finn George Modathara
- Release date: 19 October 2014 (India)
- Running time: 120 minutes
- Country: India
- Language: Malayalam

Unto the Dusk (Asthamayam Vare) is a Malayalam film directed by Sajin Baabu as his first feature project in Malayalam. The film stars first-timers Prakruthi Dutta Mukheri, Shilpa Kavalam, and Sanal Aman.

== Background ==
Wishing to try a "novel approach" to visual communication, Sajin Baabu wrote the script with no background score and with characters being unnamed, and in December 2010, while he was with a team at the Kairali Theatre in Thiruvananthapuram to shoot a documentary of one of the IFFK delegates, he met writer and artist M.P. Sheeja. After he showed her his script for Unto the Dusk, she agreed to produce it with her associate L. Geetha. In December 2013, the film was reported and being near completion with an expected release date for some time in early 2014. Most of the film's cast are "first-timers".

== Plot ==
The film opens with a scene of death of a young choir singer in a seminary with evidence pointing towards necrophilia. The police suspects and tortures two seminary students. What follows is a nonlinear, fragmented, cinematic collection of images that travel back and forth in time, in fine detail at times and just a suggestive glance at other times, thus assisting and obfuscating the viewer in this engagement with the film.

== Cast ==
- Sanal Aman
- Prakruthi Dutta Mukherji
- Shilpa Kavalam
- Joseph Mappilacherry
- Zakkir
- Neeraj Gupta
- Sivan Vadakara
- Stephy Johns
- Meenakshi
- Shabna
- Titus
- Shajahan Abhinaya
- N. M. Sunny
- Saji Kaavalam

== Awards and nominations ==
Unto the dusk was first premiered in Mumbai International Film Festival in 2014 in India Gold category followed by Bengaluru International Film festival 2014 where it won Chitrbharathi award for Best Indian Film. The film was one of the movies that was selected for the International Film competition section in International Film Festival of Kerala (IFFK) 2014 winning Rajathachakoram and the Certificate of Merit for Promotion.

The movie also won the director, Sajin Baabu, the Best-Debut Director Award at Kerala Film Critic's Association 2014.
