= Kerala Film Critics Association Awards 2024 =

Annual Indian film awards ceremony

48th Kerala Film Critics Association Awards
- Organised by: Kerala Film Critics Association

Highlights
- Best Film: Feminichi Fathima
- Most awards: Sookshmadarshini

The 48th Kerala Film Critics Association Awards, recognising excellence in the Malayalam films released in 2024, were announced in April 2025.

== Winners ==
Major Awards
| Category | Winner(s) | Work(s) |
|---|---|---|
| Best Film | Fasil Muhammed | Feminichi Fathima |
| Best Director | Indu Lakshmi | Appuram |
| Best Actor | Tovino Thomas | Ajayante Randam Moshanam, Anweshippin Kandethum |
| Best Actress | Nazriya Nazim | Sookshmadarshini |
| Best Actress | Rima Kallingal | Theatre – The Myth of Reality |
| Second Best Film | MC Jithin | Sookshmadarshini |

Performance Awards
| Category | Winner(s) | Work(s) |
|---|---|---|
| Best Supporting Actor (Male) | Saiju Kurup | Bharatanatyam, The Third Murder, Sthanarthi Sreekuttan |
| Best Supporting Actor (Male) | Arjun Ashokan | Anand Sreebala, Swatham Punyalan, Anpodu Kanmani |
| Best Supporting Actress | Shamla Hamza | Feminichi Fathima |
| Best Supporting Actress | Chinnu Chandini | Vishesham |
| Special Jury Award for Excellence in Acting | Jaffar Idukki, Harilal, Pramod Veliyanad | Orumbettavan, Qalb, Mandakini, Chattuli, Am Ah, Kuttante Shinigami, Aanandhapuram Diaries, Poyyamozhi, Karthavu Kriya Karmam, Prathimukham, Theatre – The Myth of Reality, Kondal |
| Best Child Artiste (Male) | Master Angelo Christiano | Kalam Std V B |
| Best Child Artiste (Female) | Baby Melisa | Kalam Std V B |

Technical and Artistic Awards
| Category | Winner(s) | Work(s) |
|---|---|---|
| Best Screenplay | Don Palathara, Sherin Catherine | Family |
| Best Lyricist | Vasu Areekkode, Vishal Johnson | Ramuvinte Manaivikal, Prathimukham |
| Best Music Director | Rajesh Vijay | Mayamma |
| Best Playback Singer (Male) | Madhu Balakrishnan | "Om Swasthi" (Sukhino Bhavanthu) |
| Best Playback Singer (Female) | Vaikkom Vijayalekshmi, Devananda Girish | "Angu Vaana Konilu", "Naattinidayana" |
| Best Cinematography | Deepak D Menon | Ko |
| Best Film Editor | Krishand | Sangharsha Ghadana |
| Best Sound Design | Resul Pookutty, Arunav Dutta, Robin Kunjukutty | Vadakkan |
| Best Art Direction | Gokul Das | ARM |
| Best Makeup Artist | Gurpreet Kaur, Bhoobalan Murali | Barroz |
| Best Costume Designer | Jyoti Madnani Singh | Barroz |

Special and Thematic Awards
| Category | Winner(s) | Work(s) |
|---|---|---|
| Best Children's Film | Liio Mithran Mathew (Director), Sthanarthi | Kalam Std V B |
| Best Debut Director | Vishnu K Mohan | Iruniram |
| Best Debut Actor | Neha Nasnin | Qalb |
| Special Jury – Direction | Shan Kecheri | Swachanda Mrithyu |
| Best Movie on Women Empowerment | | Her |
| Best Movie on National Integration | | Najas |
| Best Environmental Film | | Aadachayi – The Life of Mangrove |
| Best Movie with Social Relevance | | Prathimukham, Jeevan, Izha |
| Best Movie with a Message | | Mashippachayum Kallupencilum, Swargam |
| Best Sanskrit Movie | | Ekaki, Dharmayodha |
| Best Other Language Film | | Amaran |
| Best Popular Film of the Year | | ARM |
