= Davinchi Santhosh =

Indian actor

- Born: 29 October 2010 (age 15); Vellangallur, India
- Other names: Master Davinchi, Davu
- Occupation: Actor
- Years active: 2018

Davinchi Santhosh is a Malayalam film child actor. His debut was in French Viplavam directed by K.B.Maju. His character in the movie Lonappante Mamodeesa was noticed. He received Kerala State Film Award and Kerala State Television Award for Best Child Actor.

== Personal life ==
Davinchi was born to Santhosh and Dhanya on 29 October 2010 at Vellangallur. He acted in a street drama and then a short films from 4th class. He is student in GHSS Karupadanna.

== Filmography ==
| Year | Title | Role | Notes |
|---|---|---|---|
| 2018 | French Viplavam | Pachu | |
| 2018 | Samaksham | | |
| 2019 | Lonappante Mamodeesa | | |
| 2019 | Thottappan | Joymon | |
| 2021 | Kaadakalam | | |
| 2022 | Bheeshma Parvam | | |
| 2022 | Pada | Azad | |
| 2022 | Varayan | Keppa | |
| 2023 | Jaladhara Pumpset Since 1962 | | |
| 2024 | Pallotty 90's kids | Young Kannan | Kerala State Film Award for Best Child Actor |

== Short film ==
| Year | Title | Notes |
|---|---|---|
| 2018 | Pallotty | |
| 2019 | Ekru | |
| 2020 | Kalamadan | |
| 2022 | Village Cricket Boy | Kerala State Television Award for Best Child Actor. |
| 2023 | Velicham | |
