= Aabhaasam =

2018 film by Jubith Namradath

- Directed by: Jubith Namradath
- Screenplay by: Jubith Namradath
- Produced by: Sanju Unnithan, Rajeev Ravi
- Starring: Suraj Venjaramoodu
- Cinematography: Prasanna S. Kumar
- Edited by: Shameer Muhammed
- Music by: Dev
- Production companies: Spire Productions; Collective Phase One
- Distributed by: Amour Films & Release
- Release date: 4 May 2018 (India)
- Country: India
- Language: Malayalam

Aabhaasam is a 2018 Indian Malayalam-language social satirical film written and directed by Jubith Namradath. The film stars Suraj Venjaramoodu, Alencier Ley Lopez, Indrans, and Rima Kallingal.

== Plot ==
Aabhaasam is a story told through a bus journey from Bangalore to Thiruvananthapuram, it dwells on the theme of suppressed urges of lust and the unapologetic inhumane acts that people find to satisfy it. The film unfolds the theme through instances of the story-line.

== Cast ==
- Suraj Venjaramoodu
- Indrans
- Alencier Ley Lopez
- Nassar
- Rima Kallingal
- Gilu Joseph
- Abhija Sivakala
- Vijilesh Karayad
- Vijayakumar
- Saritha Kukku
- Divya Gopinath
- Nirmal Palazhi
- Anil Nedumangad
- Mamukkoya

== Controversy ==
Divya Gopinath accused Alencier Ley Lopez of sexually assaulting her on set without initially revealing her name in a blogpost in October 2018. Alencier reported that the issue was resolved when asked to which Divya disagreed to.

== Reception ==
Anagha Jayan E. of Onmanorama rated the film 4/5 and wrote, "Graphics, music tracks and editing have played important roles in making Aabhaasam a wholesome artwork. The rebellious mood of the movie is maintained by the striking tracks of popular music band oorali." Deepa Soman of The Times of India rated the film 3/5 stars and wrote, "Parodying many of our prejudices from the rich minefield of societal differences, Aabhasam is a relatable, entertaining watch. [...] For a trip that's as eventful as this, the story ambience at the destination doesn't really excite much. It lacks a certain punch that such a story could have easily offered."

Anna MM Vetticad of Firstpost wrote, "Too many metaphors in Aabhaasam lack subtlety, too many characters rear their heads with promise but then fade away, and there are too many socio-political references that, though current and relevant, barely skim the surface of the issues in question. [...] Jubith Namradath’s sincerity is evident in Aabhaasam but obviously more was needed." S. R. Praveen of The Hindu wrote, "Some of the individual stories prick your interest, like the one involving Indrans. But, as loud as the film is in driving home some of its messages, at times literally explaining it, the script needlessly restrains itself in giving us a little more background of some of the more interesting characters."
