= Varayan =

2022 Malayalam film

- Release poster
- Directed by: Jijo Joseph
- Written by: Danny Capuchin
- Produced by: Premachandran A. G.
- Starring: Siju Wilson; Leona Lishoy; Maniyanpilla Raju
- Cinematography: Rajeesh Raman
- Edited by: Johnkutty
- Music by: Prakash Alex
- Production company: Sathyam Cinemas
- Release date: 20 May 2022
- Running time: 143 minutes
- Country: India
- Language: Malayalam

Varayan is a 2022 Indian Malayalam-language action drama film directed by Jijo Joseph. The film was written by Danny, and it was produced by Premachandran A. G. It stars Siju Wilson and Leona Lishoy in lead roles. The film was released worldwide on 20 May 2022.

== Cast ==
- Siju Wilson as Fr. Eby Capuchin/Ebichan
- Leona Lishoy as Daisy
- Jude Anthany Joseph as Fr.Aju
- Jayashankar
- Vijayaraghavan as Bishop
- Davinchi Santhosh
- Maniyanpilla Raju as Isthak
- Baiju Ezhupunna as Varkey
- Bindu Panicker as Thressia Chedathy
- Adinad Sasi
- Harish Pengan
- Joy Mathew as Fr. Carlose

== Soundtrack ==
The film's soundtrack and score are composed by Prakash Alex. The lyrics for the songs were penned by B. K. Harinarayanan. Sanah Moidutty made her debut as a playback singer in Malayalam in this film.

Varayan

Soundtrack album by Prakash Alex
- Released: 1 June 2022
- Recorded: 2022
- Genre: Feature film soundtrack
- Length: 17:46
- Language: Malayalam

Prakash Alex chronology
Mohanlal (2018)	Varayan (2022)

No.	Title	Lyrics	Singer(s)	Length
1.	"Edanin Madhunirayum"	Harinarayanan BK	Sanah Moidutty	03:41
2.	"Para Para Para Paarupenne"	Harinarayanan BK	Mathai Sunil, Bijibal, Jibin Gopal, Madhu Paul, Vijay Jacob, Poby, Prakash	04:42
3.	"Kayalondu Vattam Varache"	Harinarayanan BK	Sai Bhadra, Anamika Prakash, Pavni Prakash, Joann Lizbet, Christa Merrin	04:11
4.	"Naadente Naadu"	Harinarayanan BK	K. S. Harisankar	04:03
5.	"Penkathiron Varavane"	Harinarayanan BK	Anna Jacob	01:09
Total length:				17:46

== Production ==
The film was produced by Premachandran A. G. under the banner of Sathyam Cinemas. The puja event for the film production was held in Kochi, and the shooting began in December 2019. The first look poster for the film was released on 19 January 2020. The cinematography of the film was done by Rajeesh Raman, and the editing of the film was done by Johnkutty. The actor, Jude Anthany Joseph, got injured in his leg while shooting the film at Alappuzha, and it was shared in an interview on The New Indian Express. The teaser for the film was released on 19 May 2022. The trailer for the film was released on 20 April 2022.

== Release ==
=== Theatrical ===
The film was released theatrically on 20 May 2022.

=== Home media ===
The online streaming rights to the film were sold to Amazon Prime Video.

== Reception ==
V Vinod Nair critic of Times of india gave 3 stars out of 5 and stated that "If you are a Siju Wilson fan, you can watch this light-hearted movie, with a willing suspension of disbelief". Critic from Mathrubhumi and Manorama Online critic gave mixed reviews. Samayam critic gave 3.5 out of 5
