= Biriyaani =

2019 film directed by Sajin Babu

- Theatrical release poster
- Directed by: Sajin Baabu
- Written by: Sajin Baabu
- Starring: Kani Kusruti; Shailaja Jala; Anil Nedumangad
- Cinematography: Karthik Muthukumar
- Edited by: Appu N. Bhattathiri
- Music by: Leo Tom
- Production company: UAN Film House
- Distributed by: Line of Colour
- Release dates: 3 October 2019 (Rome); 26 March 2021 (India)
- Running time: 96 minutes
- Country: India
- Language: Malayalam

Biriyaani is a 2019 Indian Malayalam-language drama film written and directed by Sajin Baabu. It features Kani Kusruti and Shailaja Jala in the lead roles. The film won NETPAC award for best film in 20th Asiatica Film Festival in Rome, Jury prize for Best Film at Bangalore International Film Festival, best film at the Caleidoscope Indian Film festival, Boston etc. Actress Kani Kusruti won the best actress at the BRICS competition section of the 42nd Moscow Film Festival, best actress at the Caleidoscope Indian Film festival, second-best actress award at the Imagine Film Festival in Madrid, Spain, and the 2019 Kerala State Film Award for Best Actress at Kerala State Film Awards for her performance in this film.

== Plot ==
Khadeeja endures a loveless marriage, where she is treated as nothing more than an object for her husband's pleasure. When she seeks her own pleasure, he rebukes her, blaming it on her incomplete circumcision, reinforcing the belief that women should not experience sex. She has strained relationships with her in-laws, while her mother, plagued by anxiety, struggles with her mental health. Though Khadeeja is only educated up to high school, her brother is an engineer who recently returned from the Middle East. His sudden departure triggers another breakdown in their mother, which Khadeeja soothes by promising a feast to commemorate their father's death anniversary.

News reports warn of radical Wahhabi influence spreading through Malayalees returning from Saudi Arabia, fueling extremist activities. Soon, Khadeeja and her mother are investigated due to her brother's alleged ties to terrorism. Under pressure from the community, her husband divorces her via text, forbids her from contacting their son, and abandons her. Seeking answers, she visits Abubakar, her brother's handler who refuses to help, warning them to stay away. The mosque soon excommunicates them. Later, Abubakar brings money from her brother, which she rejects, demanding his return. In a letter, her brother urges her to take their mother to a shrine for healing.

At the shrine, they meet Bijil, a priest who tells them faith alone won't heal her mother—most visitors come for free meals. Khadeeja observes a woman selling her body and the priest's hypocrisy in secret self-indulgence. When Bijil confronts her, she mocks religious double standards. Days later, he shows her news of her brother's death in Kashmir and Abubakar's arrest, she hides this from her mother. Bijil, having no family left, offers her his home and financial support. They relocate, but Khadeeja resists using his money. When a journalist exposes her family's past, her mother dies in shock. Grieving and destitute, she turns to prostitution, shedding her conservative identity. Bijil disapproves but continues helping her.

Determined to honour her mother's wish for a memorial feast, she hosts an iftar, inviting even her ex-husband. Before the event, police detain her under false pretences, causing a miscarriage. At the iftar, guests unknowingly consume biryani laced with her stillborn fetus. Bijil, horrified, leaves her, insisting two wrongs don't make a right. Alone, she feeds a stray dog with her last money before drowning herself.

In her final moments, she imagines being in control of her own body, having sex with her ex-husband as she had always wished.

== Cast ==
- Kani Kusruti as Khadeeja
- Shailaja Jala as Suhara Beevi
- Anil Nedumangad as NIA Officer
- Shyam Reji as Thadiyan
- Surjith Gopinath as Mohammad Bijil
- Mini I G as Journalist
- Thonakkal Jayachandran as Nazeer
- Bob Felix as Abubakar

== Production ==
The film was shot at places close to Varkala, Thiruvananthapuram and also at some places in Tamil Nadu.

Kani Kusruti said that Sajin approached her saying that he had written the role with her in mind.

== Release ==
The film had its world premiere at 20th Asiatica Film Festival in Rome on 3 October 2019.

The Central Board of Film Certification approved of the film with few cuts of close shots of the circumcision scene and that of the goat slaughter. Also the nudity was asked to be blurred. The film was rated ‘adults only’ by the Censor Board. The film was released theatrically in India on 26 March 2021, however several theatres refuse to screen the film.

Baradwaj Rangan of Film Companion South wrote, "The film is about the travails of being an oppressed caste/class Muslim woman, and also about generally being Muslim in Kerala."

== Awards ==
- Kerala State Film Award for Best Actress - 2020
- Best actress in the BRICS competition section at the 42nd Moscow International Film Festival.
- Jury prize for Best Film at Bengaluru International Film Festival.
- Kerala Film Critics Award for Best Screenplay
- Special Mention at 67th National Film Awards
- Filmfare Critics Award for Best Actress – Malayalam
