= Village Cricket Boy =

- poster
- Directed by: Rahul R. Sarma
- Written by: Livin C. Lonakutty
- Produced by: Rijaz Sulaiman; Jomon Kechery(executive producer)
- Starring: Davinchi Santhosh, Divya Gopinath
- Cinematography: Michael Joseph
- Music by: Bijibal
- Release date: 8 July 2022 (Nerambokku youtube channel)
- Running time: 34:20minutes
- Country: India
- Language: Malayalam

Village Cricket Boy is a 2022 Malayalam-language Indian children's short film directed by Rahul R. Sarma, starring Davinchi Santhosh and Divya Gopinath. The film won the 2022 Kerala State Television Awards for Best Children's Film and Best Child Actor.International Documentary Short Film Festival of Kerala was screened in the competition section of the film festival.

== Plot ==
Kannan was born and brought up in a simple family in a small beautiful village. He loved cricket and Sachin Tendulkar very much. One day while playing cricket with his friends, Kannan's cricket bat gets damaged. When he doesn't have enough money to buy a new bat, his friends isolate him. When he comes home, Kannan quarrels with his mother and goes to the next house, where he finds out that there is a free bat signed by Sachin with Boost in the advertisement seen on TV. Gone are the days of making money through many bad methods to buy a boost. When the money is ready, when he comes to the shop, when the shopkeeper informs him that the offer is over, Kannan comes home worried and sees his mother and brother from a distance. Mother comes and hugs me with lots of love.

== Cast ==
- Davinchi Santhosh as Kannan
- Divya Gopinath as Mother

== Award ==
Year	Award	Category	Awardee(s)	Ref.
2022	Kerala State Television Award	Best Child film	Rijaz Sulaiman, Rahul R. Sarma, Livin C. Lonakutty	
2022	Kerala State Television Award	Best Child actor	Davinchi Santhosh	

== Music ==
Bijibal has composed music for two songs written by B.K.Harinarayanan. The first song Naadaanithu Naadu is sung by Bijibal himself. This song was released on 24 July 2021 by Bijibal official YouTube channel. Mammootty shared this song on Facebook. The second song Kadukumanni Kukudu is sung by Daya Bijibal. This song was released along with the film.Rajesh Cherthala played the flute for both the songs.

The final fix of the film is Robin Kunjukutty.
