= Ayaal Sassi =

2017 Indian film

- Theatrical release poster
- Directed by: Sajin Baabu
- Written by: Sajin Baabu
- Produced by: Sudhish Pillai, P. Sukumar
- Starring: Sreenivasan
- Cinematography: Pappu
- Edited by: Ajay Kuyiloor
- Music by: Basil C J
- Production company: Pix N Tales
- Release date: 7 July 2017 (India)
- Running time: 122 minutes
- Country: India
- Language: Malayalam

Ayaal Sassi is a 2017 Indian Malayalam-language film directed by Sajin Baabu, produced by Sudhish Pillai and P. Sukumar, and starring Sreenivasan in the lead role, along with Divya Gopinath, Kochu Preman, S. P. Sreekumar, and Anil Nedumangad. The film's music is composed by Basil C J, while the screenplay is based on a story written by Sajin Baabu. Ayal Sassi was nominated for the Kerala State Film Award in 2016.

== Plot ==
The film revolves around the life of a sexagenarian named Sassi Namboothiri. He is a carefree person with no family baggage and a gang of friends for whom he conducts parties at his home every weekend. He is known to the people as an artist and makes his living by purchasing drawings from fine arts college students and selling them at a higher price, with his name attached.

One day, Sassi finds out that he is suffering from fourth-stage liver cancer due to his drinking habit and has only six months to live. Sassi orders a "smart" coffin to be cremated in, and converts to Christianity.

In the end, he is told that the coffin he has chosen is much bigger than regular ones and thus cannot be allowed to be cremated. Sassi, feeling despondent, casts the coffin adrift and walks away.

== Cast ==
- Sreenivasan as Sassi Namboothiri
- Divya Gopinath as Sreelatha
- S. P. Sreekumar
- Anil Nedumangad as Mansoor
- Kochu Preman as Sathyaneshan

== Soundtrack ==
- "Sasippattu" – Vineeth Sreenivasan
- "Akkana Thikkana" – Sreenivasan

== Reception ==
Padmakumar K. of Onmanorama rated the film 3/5 and wrote, "Had there been a bit more maturity in terms of execution, the film would have stood on a totally different pedestal. Yet, Sajin's effort to save the narrative from falling into an entirely intellectual pattern is evident."
