= Anyarku Praveshanamilla =

- Malayalam: അന്യർക് പ്രവേശനമില്ല
- Directed by: V.S Jayakrishna
- Written by: Jayaraj Madai, Hari Madai
- Produced by: Dhanesh Prabha Kakkad
- Starring: Tini Tom; Suraj Venjaramoodu; Sunil Sukhada; Idavela Babu; Sreejith Ravi; Bijukuttan; Aditi Rai
- Cinematography: Shaji Jacob; Rajesh narayanan
- Edited by: Kapil Gopalakrishnan
- Music by: V.S Jayakrishna; Varun Raghav
- Production companies: DD Entertainment; Grammy Entertainment
- Distributed by: Cinema Paradiso
- Release date: 17 June 2016
- Running time: 135 minutes
- Country: India
- Language: Malayalam

Anyarku Praveshanamilla (transl. No entry for strangers) is a 2016 Malayalam language family comedy thriller film directed by V.S Jayakrishna and produced by Dhanesh Prabha Kakkad and Sajesh Nair under the banner DD entertainment and Grammy entertainment. The film features Tini Tom, Suraj Venjaramoodu, Idavela Babu, Sunil Sugatha in the lead roles. The film was released on 17 June 2016.

The film explains the critical issues, when friends and outsiders are given undue importance and involvement in a family's personal space. Every issue is shared meaningfully and with humor touch throughout the film. The film's title, "Anyarku Praveshanamilla" is thus given appropriately to safeguard family's personal space.

== Synopsis ==
Priyadarshan is a dubbing artist for TV serials and Ad-Films. He married Anjana for four years. They were concerned about not having a child. To overcome that, they socialised without realizing where to control and restrict their friends in their personal family space. Priyadarshan and Anjana are such couple who openly speaks their issues each other and resolve the same. Meera and Valanja Vazhi Sinjo are their intimate friends during college time. It was a surprise for Priyadarshan and Anjana to meet their old friends again after many years. Gradually these old friends started visiting the couple very frequently in their apartment. In one of their neighboring flats stay Chacko, David, and Kaimal. They lead a lavish life. Priyadarshan befriends them. Meanwhile, Anjana smells something fishy about Priyadarshan's behavior. The resulting incidents are narrated in ‘Anyarku Praveshanamilla’ through suspense comedy track. The moral is friends and outsiders should not be overly involved in one family's personal space.

== Cast ==
- Tini Tom as Priyadarshan
- Suraj Venjaramoodu as Valanja Vazhi Sinjo
- Sreejith Ravi as Black Mani
- Idavela Babu as Chako
- Chali Pala as Kaimal
- Sunil Sukhada as David
- Bijukuttan as Shefi
- Aditi Rai as Anjana (Priyadarshan's Wife)
- Ponnamma Babu as Mary
- Jeena Riju as Meera
- Shruti as Kavitha Nair
- Kottayam Pradeep as Director Ittikandom
- Saji Surendran as himself
- Kalabhavan Rahman as Ratheesh
- Shreyani
- Master Koustubh
- Baby Adisha
- Harisree Yousof as Priest

== Production ==
The film is produced by Dhanesh Prabha Kakkad and Sajesh Nair under the banner of DD Entertainment & Grammy Entertainment. Cinematography was done by Rajesh Narayanan. and music direction by VS Jayakrishna & Varun Raghav. Stills were done by Premlal.

The film was shot at various locations in Aluva, Ernakulam, Thodupuzha, Vagamon.

== Music ==
Anyarku praveshanamilla

Soundtrack album by VS Jayakrishna, Varun Raghav
- Released: 22 May 2016
- Recorded: 2015
- Genre: Feature film soundtrack
- Length: 10:17
- Language: Malayalam
- Label: Muzik 247
- Producer: Dhanesh Prabha Kakkad

Two songs were composed for the film. The title song is composed by Varun Raghav and sung by Jassie Gift. The second song, "Dhekho mein thumse" was marked as a highlight of the film, the song was written by the renowned Film director Major Ravi and sung and acted by actor Tini Tom himself, and is composed by director V.S Jayakrishna.

Anyarku praveshanamilla (soundtrack)
No.	Title	Lyrics	Music	Singer(s)	Length
1.	"Dhekho mein thumse-(Hindi)"	Major Ravi	V.S Jayakrishna	Tini Tom, Sheen Shah	5:24
2.	"Kalla Kannaal Karalinakath"	Shabi Panangat	Varun Raghav	Jassie Gift, Anjali Sugunan	4:53
Total length:					10:17

== Release ==
The film was initially planned for a release in February 2016. But the post-production works did not complete, which postponed the film to open during the Hindu festival of Vishu in April 2016. But the release date was again pushed to May as the post-production work had only completed on May first week. Anyarku Praveshanamilla was finally scheduled to release on 17 June 2016.

== Reception ==
The movie had a limited release and was a disaster at the box office.
