= Cuckoo Parameswaran =

Indian actress

- Born: 1972 (age 53–54); Thiruvananthapuram
- Occupations: Film Actress; Dubbing artist

Cuckoo Parameswaran is an Indian actress,dubbing artist and dancer who works predominantly in Malayalam film industry. She won the Kerala State Film Award for Second Best Actress in 1988 for her performance in the film Ore Thooval Pakshikal.

Cuckoo Parameswaran was elected as General Secretary of Association of Malayalam Movie Artists (AMMA) in 2025.

== Career ==
Cuckoo started her acting career as a child artist. she is also a classical dancer, Fashion designer and theatre actress.She studied at the School of Drama and Fine Arts, University of Calicut, specialising in direction. Later, she studied textile design at the National Institute of Fashion Technology. Her performances in the films Cotton Mary, Moonilonnu, Oridathu, Kazhakam, Sammohanam, Vanaprastham, Janam, Anantharam, Thinkalaazhcha Nalla Divasam and Nizhalkuthu have been noted. Her husband is director Murali Menon.

== Filmography ==
=== As an actor ===
Year	Title	Role	Notes
1985	Thinkalaazhcha Nalla Divasam	Sheenu	
1986	Oridathu	Panchami	
1987	Anantaram	Nurse	
1988	Ore Thooval Pakshikal		
1993	Janam	Anjana	
1994	Sammohanam	Kunjuni	
1995	Ormakalundayirikkanam		
1995	Kazhakam	Nandhini	
1995	Mini	Mini's mother	
1996	Moonilonnu	Kalyani	
1999	Cotton Mary	Nurse	English film
1999	Vanaprastham	Savithri	
2001	Jeevan Masai		
2002	Kannathil Muthamittal	Sundari	Tamil film
2002	Nizhalkuthu	Woman seeking treatment in Kaliyappan	
2005	Udayon	Malli	
2023	Avakasikal		
