= Sammohanam (1994 film) =

- Directed by: C. P. Padmakumar
- Written by: Balakrishnan Mangad
- Produced by: C. P. Padmakumar
- Starring: Murali; Nedumudi Venu; Archana
- Cinematography: M. J. Radhakrishnan
- Edited by: K.R. Bose
- Music by: Ilaiyaraaja
- Production company: Cinevalley Motion Pictures
- Release date: 1994
- Running time: 1 hour 44 minutes
- Country: India
- Language: Malayalam

Sammohanam (Enchantment) is a 1994 Indian Malayalam-language film directed by C. P. Padmakumar, starring Murali, Nedumudi Venu and Archana. The film was selected in the Best of the Fest category at the Edinburgh International Film Festival in 1995. The film is based on Rithubhedangal, a story written by Balakrishnan Mangad. The film being non-commercial and off-beat, was made on a controlled budget. Ilaiyaraaja did this film without charging fees as he was impressed with its storyline and also won Kerala State Film Award for Best Background Music.

== Plot ==
Sammohanam tells the story of a mysteriously seductive girl, Pennu in a quiet village to which she has temporarily relocated, in search of her missing grandfather, Karuvan Valyachan. She creates a strange chasm among male folks, breaking marriages and old friendships. Chandu, a wealthy farmer who owns paddy fields was the first to fall for her charms and even breaks up with his wife Jaanu and family. Later when Pennu started wooing Chindan, a jaggery mill owner and a close friend of Chandu, he cannot stand it and attacked Chindan with a sickle, chopping off his earlobe. Then comes Ummini, a travelling seller with his pair of horses. He is an old alley of Pennu's grandfather. Soon he too got enchanted and fell for Pennu's charm. Ambu, a helper of Chandu also has a hidden passion for Pennu, even though he is much younger to Pennu. Chandu sees Ummini and Pennu together and becomes angry and fought Ummini with his sickle. Ambu tries to intervene and gets accidentally knifed to death by Chandu. Chandu out of guilt and grief commits suicide by jumping into a waterfall. Finally Pennu leaves the village alone, after torching her house, having fractured the village community with her sexuality.

== Cast ==
- Murali as Chandu
- Archana as Pennu
- Nedumudi Venu as Ummini
- Sarath Das as Ambu
- Radhakrishnan as Chindan
- K. P. A. C. Lalitha as Chiruthamma
- Bindu Panicker as Jaanu (wife of Chandu)
- Cuckoo Parameswaran as Kunjani (sister of Chindan)
