= Edavela Babu =

Indian actor

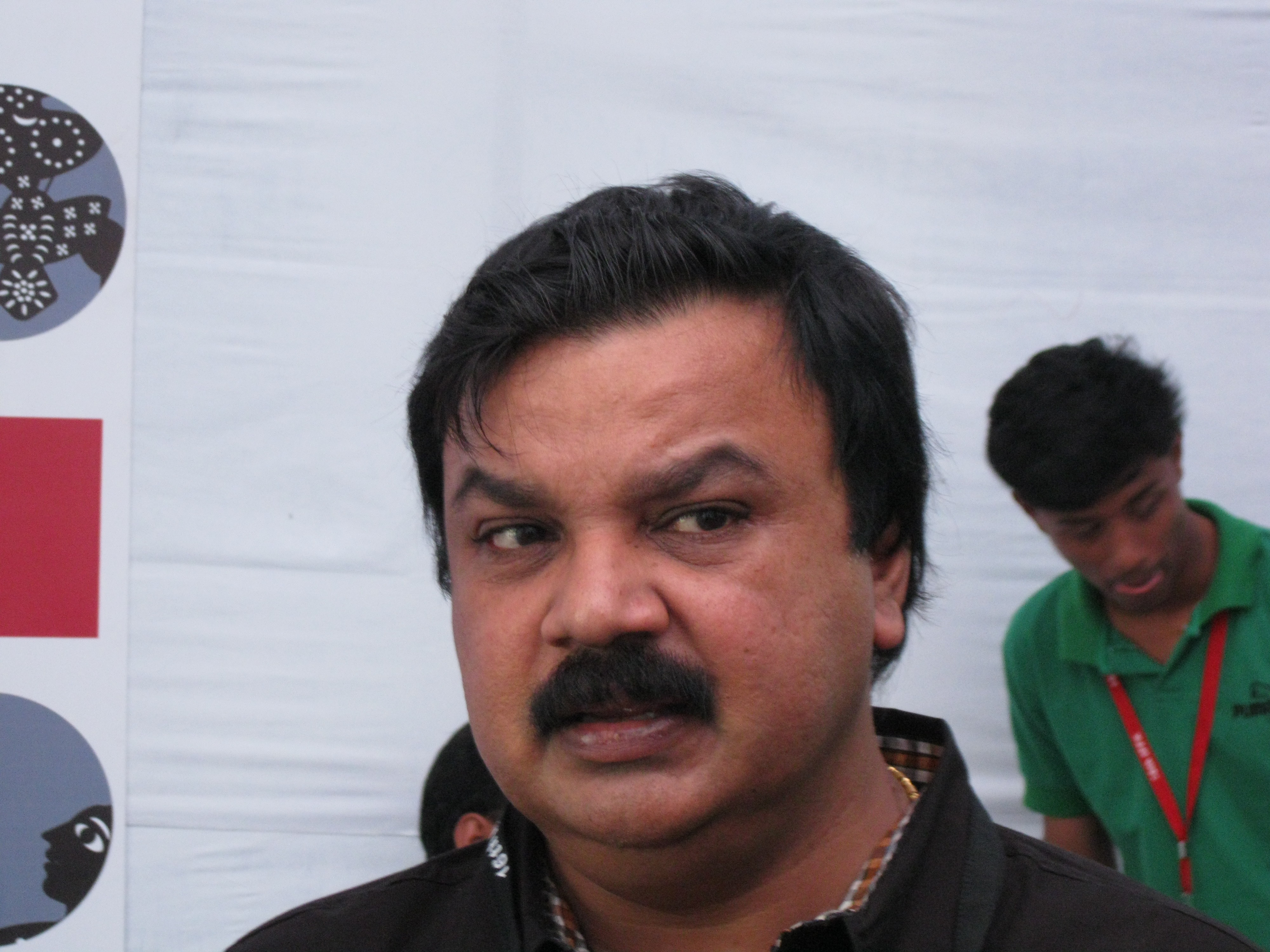
- Edavela Babu at IFFK 2011
- Born: Ammanath Babu Chandran; 11 August 1963 (age 62); Irinjalakuda, Thrissur, Kerala, India
- Occupation: Actor
- Years active: 1981–present
- Website: www.edavelababu.com

Ammanath Babu Chandran (born 11 August 1963), better known by his stage name Edavela Babu, is an Indian actor who appears in the Malayalam cinema. He made his acting debut in 1982 with Idavela, from which he got his stage name. Since then, he has worked in over 200 films. Babu has served as general secretary of Association of Malayalam Movie Artists (AMMA). Currently, he is a part of the Indian National Congress political party.

== Early life and education ==
Babu was born on 11 August 1963 to Raman and Shantha at Irinjalakuda in Thrissur district of Kerala. He completed his schooling from Govt. Model Boys Higher Secondary School, Irinjalakuda. He was graduated in Commerce from the Christ College, Irinjalakuda. He is also a postgraduate in Commerce.

=== Sexual Assault case ===
Edavela Babu was arrested after a round of questioning by the Special Investigation Team in a case of sexual abuse against him based on a complaint of a former actress, but released on bail.

== Filmography ==
=== Films ===
Year	Title	Role	Notes
1982	Idavela	Ravi	
1985	Puli Varunne Puli	Babu	
1985	Ayanum	Lizy's Brother	
1986	Neram Pularumbol		
1987	Sreedharante Onnam Thirumurivu	Babu	
1989	Peruvannapurathe Visheshangal	Suresh	
1989	The News	Albert	
1991	Meena Bazaar	Anil	Hindi film
1991	Ganamela	Babu	
1991	Ottayal Pattalam		
1992	Ennodishtam Koodamo		
1992	Kasarkode Khaderbai		
1992	Thalasthanam		
1992	Aayushkalam	Gopi	
1993	Agnishalabhangal		
1993	Kulapathy		
1993	Ghazal	Nambeesan kutty	
1993	Samagamam	Babu	
1993	Oru Kadankatha Pole	Unni	
1994	Pidakkozhi Koovunna Noottandu		
1994	Cabinet	Sudhakaran	
1995	Keerthanam		
1995	Mazhavilkoodaram	Supru	
1995	Samudhayam		
1996	K. L. 7/95 Ernakulam North	Babu	
1996	Hitlist	Murali	
1996	Ishtamanu Nooru Vattam		
1996	Hitler	Chandru	
1996	Mookkilla Rajyathu Murimookkan Rajavu	Rahul	
1996	Mimics Super 1000	Babu	
1997	The Good Boys	Susheelan	
1998	Gloria Fernandez From USA		
1998	Mayajalam	Vishwan	
1999	Aakasha Ganga	Ravi	
1999	Pranaya Nilavu		
1999	Auto Brothers		
2000	Priyankari		
2003	Chronic Bachelor	'Kuruvi' Kuruvilla	
2003	Kalavarkey	Vishnu	
2003	Pattalam	Krishna Panikkar	
2004	Masanagudi Mannadiyar Speaking		
2004	Nirappakittu		
2005	Naran	Paramu	
2005	Boyy Friennd	Arumukhan	
2005	Udayon	Itti	
2006	Pachakkuthira	Subair - Travel Agent	
2006	Lion	Pathrose	
2008	Twenty:20	Josuttan	
2008	De Ingottu Nokkiye		
2009	Swantham Lekhakan	Bijuraj	
2009	Evidam Swargamanu	Peethambaran	
2010	Brahmasthram	A B P	
2010	Pranchiyettan & the Saint	Yusuf	
2012	Father's Day	Abeed Ali	
2012	Da Thadiya	Jose Prakash	
2012	Friday		
2013	Isaac Newton S/O Philipose	Sexton	
2013	Kadal Kadannu Oru Maathukutty	Himself	Cameo
2013	Tourist Home	Chackochan	
2013	Ithu Pathiramanal		
2013	Punyalan Agarbattis	K. C. Mathews	
2014	How Old Are You?	Bhaskaran, Superintendent	
2014	Avatharam	Babu	
2014	Ormayundo Ee Mukham	Hema's Father	
2015	She Taxi		
2015	Love 24x7		
2015	Mili	School Manager	
2015	Chirakodinja Kinavukal	Thayyalkaran's Friend	
2016	10 Kalpanakal		
2016	Dooram	Priest	
2016	Anyarku Praveshanamilla	Chako	
2018	Kayamkulam Kochunni	Menon	
2019	Mamangam	Chandroth family member	
2019	Driving License	Himself	Cameo
2021	Vellam	Babu	
2022	CBI 5: The Brain	Mammen Varghese	
2022	Monster	Adv. Vasavan	
2022	Gold	Shop owner	
2023	Maheshum Marutiyum	Jacob	
2024	DNA	Eenasu	
2025	Aap Kaise Ho		

=== Television ===
- Kerala Samajam : Oru Pravasi Kadha (Asianet)
- Ayyappa Saranam (Amrita TV)
- Panchavadippalam (flowers TV)
- Kayamkulam Kochunnide Makan (Surya TV)
- Mizhi Randilum (Surya TV)
- Bharya (Asianet)
- Kunjali Marakkar (Asianet)
- Sthree - Part 2 (Asianet)
- Swami Ayyappan (Asianet)
- Kayamkulam Kochunni (Surya TV)
- Swantham Malootty (Surya TV)
- Sayanna Swapangal (DD)
- Chillu (Tele Cinema) (DD)
- Sthree (Asianet)
- Unnimoolam
- Brammannyam
- Neeharam
- Innocent Stories
- Gokulam
- Charulatha
- Ishtamayi
- Pravesam
- Mizhiyoram
- Sparsam
- Periyattin Theerathu
- Ela Pozhiyum Kalam
- Muttathu Varkey Stories
- Desadanakilikal
- Ashtambandham
- O.Hendy Stories
- Kaliyalla Kallyanam
- Tele Cinema
- Sayanna Swapangal
- Andherdhar

== Controversy ==
Following the Hema Committee report on harassment in the Malayalam film industry, actor has been arrested for a sexual assault case but will be released on anticipatory bail. The investigation began after Minu Muneer accused seven individuals, including Babu and Mukesh, of abuse.
