= Anil Nedumangad =

Indian actor (1972–2020)

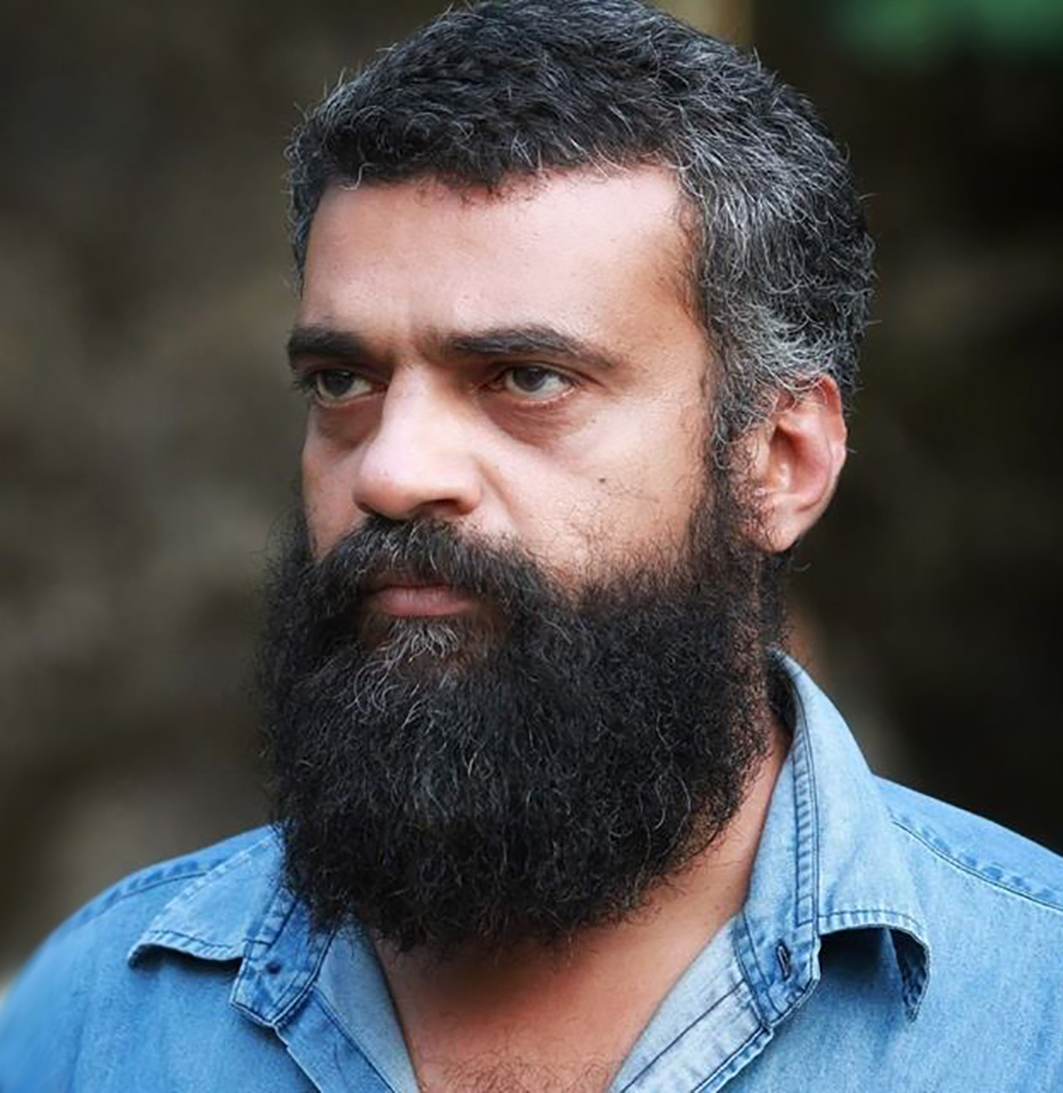
- Born: 30 May 1972; Nedumangad, Kerala, India
- Died: 25 December 2020 (aged 48); Malankara Dam, Kerala, India
- Occupations: Actor; TV anchor
- Years active: 2014–2020

Anil Nedumangad (also known as P. Anil; 30 May 1972 – 25 December 2020) was an Indian actor who appeared in Malayalam films.

== Acting career ==
He made his debut in Thaskaraveeran with an uncredited appearance. His breakthrough was in the 2014 film Njan Steve Lopez, directed by Rajeev Ravi. Other movies where he played important roles were Ayyappanum Koshiyum, Kammatipaadam, Kismath, Paavada and Porinju Mariam Jose.

== Early life ==
Anil was born in Nedumangad, Trivandrum as the son of C. Peethambharan Nair, a retired teacher, and Rajamma. He had an elder brother, Anand, an ayurvedic doctor. He studied in Mancha School, Nedumangad and pursued BA Malayalam course at Mahatma Gandhi College, Trivandrum and then went to School of Drama, Thrissur. He started his career as a TV anchor and program producer for TV Channels Kairali TV, Asianet, JaiHind TV, Reporter TV and Kairali News.

== Death ==
Anil died from drowning at Malankara Dam while swimming with friends during a break of the film Peace on 25 December 2020, aged 48. He re-entered the dam for bathing after already having a bath, and was trapped in an undercurrent. After long search his friends could not find him and sought the help of Kerala Fire Force and local people. Though he was taken to the nearby hospital, his life could not be saved. Locals say that it is difficult to swim in Malankara Dam, even for extremely good swimmers.

== Filmography ==
- All films are in Malayalam language unless otherwise noted.

Year	Film	Role	Notes
2005	Thaskaraveeran	Narayanankutty	Uncredited
2014	Njan Steve Lopez	Freddy Kochachan	
2015	Ayal Njanalla	CI Bhushan Kumar	
2016	Pavada	Drunkard Storyteller	
2016	Kammatti Paadam	Surendran	
2016	Kismath	Mohanan	
2016	Mundrothuruth: Munroe Island	Father	
2017	Samarpanam	Aravindan	
2017	Ayaal Sassi	Mansoor	
2018	Aami	VM Nair	
2018	Kalyanam		
2018	Swathanthryam Ardharathriyil	James	
2018	Parole	Vijayan	
2018	Aabhaasam		
2018	Nonsense	Sudhi	
2019	Janaadhipan	Monichan	
2019	Oru Nakshathramulla Aakasham		
2019	Neermathalam Poothakaalam		
2019	Porinju Mariyam Jose	Raphael	
2019	Thelivu	Philip	
2019	Poozhikadakan	Contractor	
2019	Valiyaperunnal	George Zacharia	
2020	Ayyappanum Koshiyum	C.I. Satheesh	
2020	Paapam Cheyyathavar Kalleriyatte	Rajan	
2020	Idam	Jayakrishnan	Released on Neestream
2021	Biriyaani	NIA Officer	
2021	Ajagajantharam	Sony	
2021	Nayattu	Police officer	Posthumous release
2021	Vishudha Rathrikal		Posthumous release
2021	Cold Case	Police Officer	Posthumous release
2022	Peace	Alex	Posthumous release
2022	Padavettu	Liju Krishna	Posthumous release
