= Sufiyum Sujatayum =

2020 film by Naranipuzha Shanavas

- Official release poster
- Directed by: Naranipuzha Shanavas
- Written by: Naranipuzha Shanavas
- Produced by: Vijay Babu
- Starring: Jayasurya; Aditi Rao Hydari; Dev Mohan; Siddique
- Cinematography: Anu Moothedath
- Edited by: Deepu Joseph
- Music by: M. Jayachandran
- Production company: Friday Film House
- Distributed by: Amazon Prime Video
- Release date: 3 July 2020
- Country: India
- Language: Malayalam

Sufiyum Sujatayum (transl. Sufi and Sujata) is a 2020 Indian Malayalam-language romantic drama film. It is written and directed by Naranipuzha Shanavas, and produced by Vijay Babu under his production company Friday Film House. It stars Jayasurya in the lead role along with Dev Mohan and Aditi Rao Hydari in the title roles. It was released on Amazon Prime Video on 3 July 2020. Actor Dev Mohan made his debut through this film.

== Plot ==
Sujatha is a mute single daughter of Mallikarjunan and Kamala, a Hindu family. She is also a talented Kathak dancer. One day Sujatha meets Sufi on a bus. Sufi is a whirling dervish and a Muslim scholar who returns after an expedition to meet his Ustad. There he loses his misbaha (prayer beads), which Sujatha returns to him. Later, Sufi gifts his misbaha to Sujatha, which was a gift from his mother. Soon after, they fall in love and decide to elope. However, she decides to stay back when her father threatens suicide. Ten years later, she is married to a NRI doctor named V. R. Rajeev, in Dubai with their daughter and thinks that love is lost.

Sufi returns to the village after ten years. Ustad is no more. Sufi visits his grave at the mosque cemetery. Imam finds him there and invites him inside. Sufi gives out the call to prayer and gathers people. Unfortunately, he dies during that prayer. Sujatha is devastated by the news of Sufi's death. Rajeev, who madly loves Sujatha, decides to bring her back to the village to attend Sufi's burial which may help her say goodbye. They reach the funeral only after Sufi's body is in the process of burial. Rajeev pays a visit at the grave, since females aren't allowed inside.

Later that evening, Rajeev realizes that he has lost his passport. After searching for it everywhere, he concludes that it could've fallen from his pocket into Sufi's grave. Rajeev and Mallikarjunan decide to unearth the grave, together with their tenant Kumaran. But the trio ends up bickering with one another when they can't find the passport. Meanwhile, Sujatha arrives there with the passport, which she had hidden so she could return the misbaha, once the grave is unearthed. The couple catches flight to return to Dubai and she lay her head on Rajeev's shoulder.

== Cast ==
- Jayasurya as Dr V. R. Rajeev, Sujatha's husband
- Aditi Rao Hydari as Sujatha, Rajeev's wife
- Dev Mohan as Sufi, Sujatha's former lover
- Siddique as Mallikarjunan, Sujata's father
- Mamukkoya as Imam Salman Hassan
- Hareesh Kanaran as Ashokan, Taxi Driver
- Madhumohan Kuttamparambath
- Kalarenjini as Kamala, Sujatha's mother
- Valsala Menon as Sujatha's grandmother
- Manikandan Pattambi as Kumaran
- Swami Shoonya as Ustad Aboob
- Lohan Balan as Moosakka
- Priya Sunny as Air hostess

== Production ==
=== Development ===
Sufiyum Sujatayum is directed by Naranipuzha Shanavas, known for his debut directorial Karie (2015). Producer Vijay Babu watched a preview screening of Karie and liked Shanavas' direction. After the premiere, Shanavas narrated the film's story to Babu and insisted him to act in the lead role. But as Babu insisted to elevate the story further, the scope of the project became bigger with the inclusion of Aditi Rao Hydari and composer M. Jayachandran. Hence, he instead chose Jayasurya for the lead role, after he previously produced Aadu (2015), Aadu 2 (2017) and Thrissur Pooram (2019).

=== Casting ===
Vijay Babu narrated the film's script to Jayasurya in mid-2019, which made the latter emotional; he described it as "a moment that he did not see on screen" expressing the emotional quotient of the film and did not read the script due to his confidence on it. The film marked Aditi Rao Hydari's return to Malayalam cinema after 14 years since Prajapathi (2006). On accepting the script, Hydari felt that she was drawn to the "fairytale-like quality" of the story adding that "The emotions of the characters are so flawed and yet so sweet and innocent that it almost felt unreal [...] It was an unreal world with real emotions". She described her character Sujata as "an embodiment of [that] true love, innocence and purity".

Dev Mohan made his acting debut with the film. He auditioned for his role as Sufi in late-2017, and eventually selected for the role. For his character, he practised the moves of whirling—a Sufi meditation practiced by dervishing orders in circles—by watching videos in YouTube; Mohan described it as a difficult process as he used to feel dizzy and took him nine months for practising it. He also learnt Arabic for the character.

=== Filming ===
The film was officially announced on 20 September 2019, with principal photography commencing the same day. Anu Moothedath handled the cinematography. The film was shot in three locations across Gundlupet, Karnataka and Kerala; according to Moothedath, Aboob's house was set in Karnataka and Sujata's in Kerala. The river scenes were shot in Attappadi. As the crew could not find the appropriate places, the three locations were combined to appear as one location in the film. The film was shot for 40 days. Aditi Rao Hydari was trained in sign language by Livin C. Lonakutty.

=== Costume design ===
Moothedath opted for vibrant colours for the flashback portions, and relatively muted colours in the present to reflect Sujata's mindset. He eventually refrained using blue coloured costumes, except for the saree which Sujata wears in the climax, as "I wanted the past settings to give off a magical vibe—a contrast to the stark reality of the present" and felt that the costumes, set design and light would be perfectly blend in order to achieve the right feeling. Sameera Sanesh was the costume designer. She was ensured to contrast the colours of costume between Aditi and Dev, as well the sets in the film.

== Music ==
The soundtrack and film score were composed by M Jayachandran. The soundtrack runs for over nineteen minutes and has seven tracks; sung by Sudeep Palanad, Nithya Mammen, and Amrutha Suresh. Manoj Yadav and B. K. Harinarayanan were the lyricists.

== Release ==
Sufiyum Sujatayum was originally scheduled for a theatrical release but was eventually delayed due to the COVID-19 pandemic. In May 2020, Amazon Prime Video announced the slate of seven Indian films set for direct-to-digital release, with Sufiyum Sujatayum being one of them; it was the first Malayalam film to be released on digital platforms. (Note: Although publications cited the same, the Malayalam-language film Fourth River (2020) was the first film to be released on digital platforms.) In June 2020, the film's scheduled premiere on 3 July 2020 was announced.

== Reception ==
Giving a rating of three stars, Sanjith Sridharan of The Times of India wrote that Shanavas "managed to shed light on the struggles, societal presumptions and how ‘religion is just a person's opinion’, through subtle dialogues". Nitya Punnackal of Manorama Online wrote that Shanavas "tosses up a curious mix of a mystical storytelling etched in the genre of lingering romance".

In a negative review, Anna M. M. Vetticad of Firstpost gave 1.5 out of 5 summarising "Deceptive marketing might have been partly forgiven if Sufiyum Sujatayum had something worthwhile to offer." S. R. Praveen of The Hindu wrote "The love and Sufism in Sufiyum Sujatayum disappointingly remains skin-deep, which is a tragedy considering the promise it held." Karthik Kumar of Hindustan Times wrote "Sufiyum Sujatayum just feels like a lot of potential where the surface has barely been scratched." Shubhra Gupta of The Indian Express wrote "for a film which is trying to say something so significant, something which bears repeating in these polarised times, it needed to have been much better." Sowmya Rajendran of The News Minute wrote "Sufiyum Sujatayum strives to be a simple love story—one that does not require explanations or footnotes—but the treatment makes it simplistic instead. A pity, because the idea had the potential to be so much more." Baradwaj Rangan of Film Companion South described it as a classy romance that is too restrained and keeps viewers at arm's length. He further wrote "the film ends up another reminder that a love story isn't quite a love story unless our hearts beat for the lovers as much as theirs beat for one another".

== Awards and nominations ==
Award	Category	Winner	Notes	Result	Ref.
51st Kerala State Film Awards	Best Music Director (song)	M. Jayachandran	For all Songs	Won	
51st Kerala State Film Awards	Best Music Director (scores)	M. Jayachandran		Won	
51st Kerala State Film Awards	Best Female Playback Singer	Nithya Maammen	For the song Vathikkalu Vellaripravu	Won	
51st Kerala State Film Awards	Best Choreographer	Lalitha Soby; Babu Xavier		Won	
51st Kerala State Film Awards	Best Sound Mixing	Ajith Abraham George		Won	
45th Kerala Film Critics Awards	Best Music Director	M. Jayachandran	For all songs	Won	
45th Kerala Film Critics Awards	Popular Movie of the Year	Sufiyum Sujatayum		Won	
10th South Indian International Movie Awards	Best Debutant Actor (Malayalam)	Dev Mohan		Won	
10th South Indian International Movie Awards	Best Female Playback Singer (Malayalam)	Nithya Maammen	For the song Vaathikkalu Vellaripravu	Won	
10th South Indian International Movie Awards	Best Male Playback Singer (Malayalam)	Sudeep Paland	For the song Alhamdulliah	Nominated	
10th South Indian International Movie Awards	Best Lyricist (Malayalam)	B. K. Harinarayanan	For the song Vaathikkalu Vellaripravu	Nominated	
10th South Indian International Movie Awards	Best Cinematographer (Malayalam)	Anu Moothedathu		Nominated	
J C Daniel Film Award	Best Music Director (scores)	M. Jayachandran	For all songs	Won	
