= Poovathussery =

- village
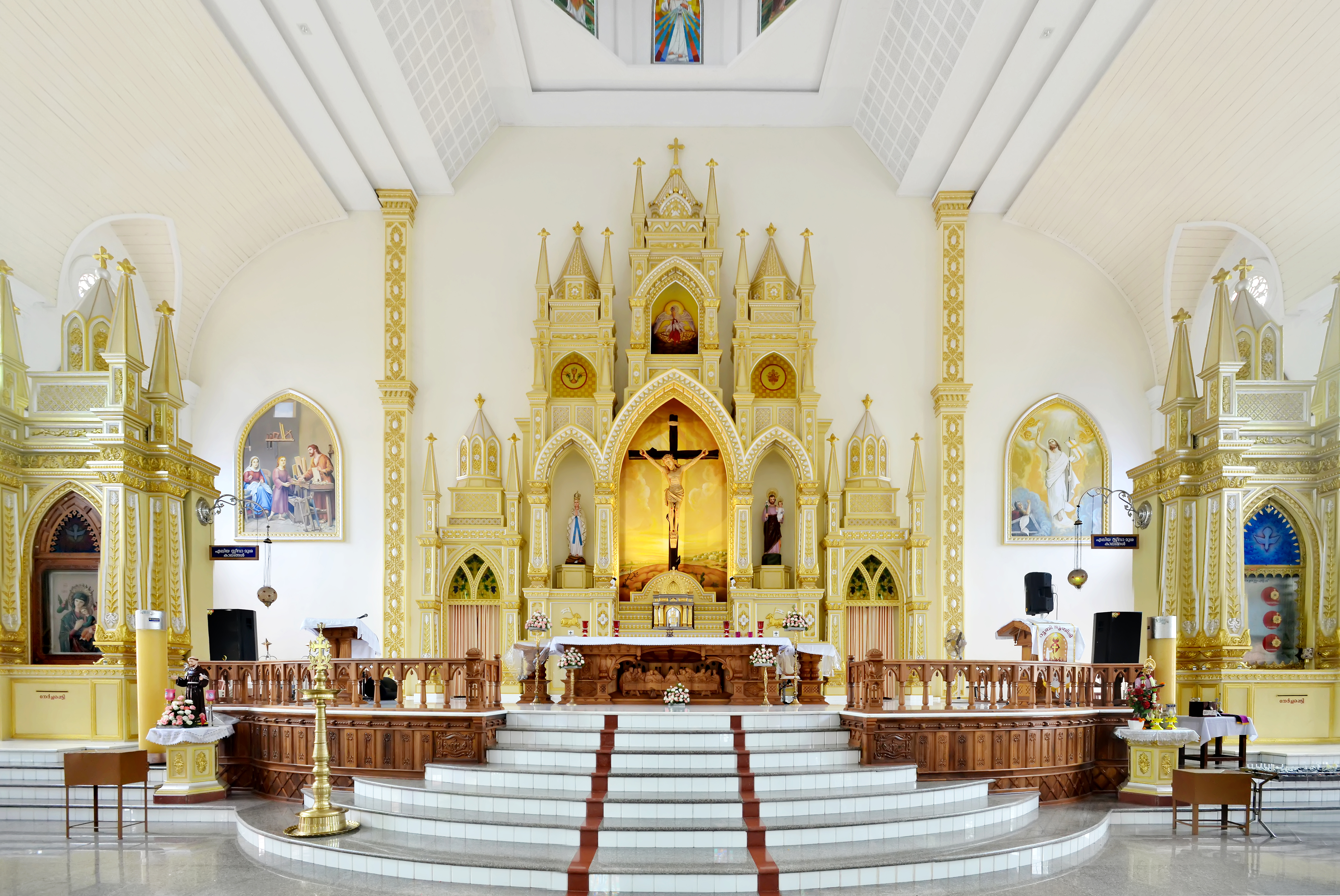
- St. Joseph's Church, Poovathussery

- Location in Kerala, India Poovathussery (India)
- Coordinates: 10°12′0″N 76°19′0″E
- Country: India
- State: Kerala
- District: Ernakulam Thrissur

Languages
  - Official: Malayalam, English
- Time zone: UTC+5:30 (IST)
- PIN: 683579/680741
- Telephone code: 0484/0480
- Vehicle registration: KL-63
- Nearest city: Aluva
- Lok Sabha constituency: Ankamali/ Mukundapuram

Poovathussery is a village in the border between Ernakulam district and Thrissur district of Kerala, India. It is situated on the banks of Chalakudy River and has several paddy lands and coconut trees. Most of the people are farmers.

== Religion ==
Poovathussery hosts The Poovathussery Karthyayini temple which is one of the 108 Durga Temples. It also contains the St Joseph Church.
