= Association of Malayalam Movie Artists =

Indian film acting organisation

- Founded: 1994
- Headquarters: Desabhimani Road, Kaloor, Kochi, Kerala
- Location: India
- Website: ammakerala.com

The Association of Malayalam Movie Artists, abbreviated as AMMA, is an Indian organisation of film actors and actresses working in the Malayalam cinema. Formed in 1994, the association has its headquarters at Kochi.

== Governing body ==
The governing body serves for three years. It includes a President, two vice-presidents, General Secretary, Joint Secretary, Treasurer and other Executive Committee members. Only members with life membership status can become a member of the governing body.

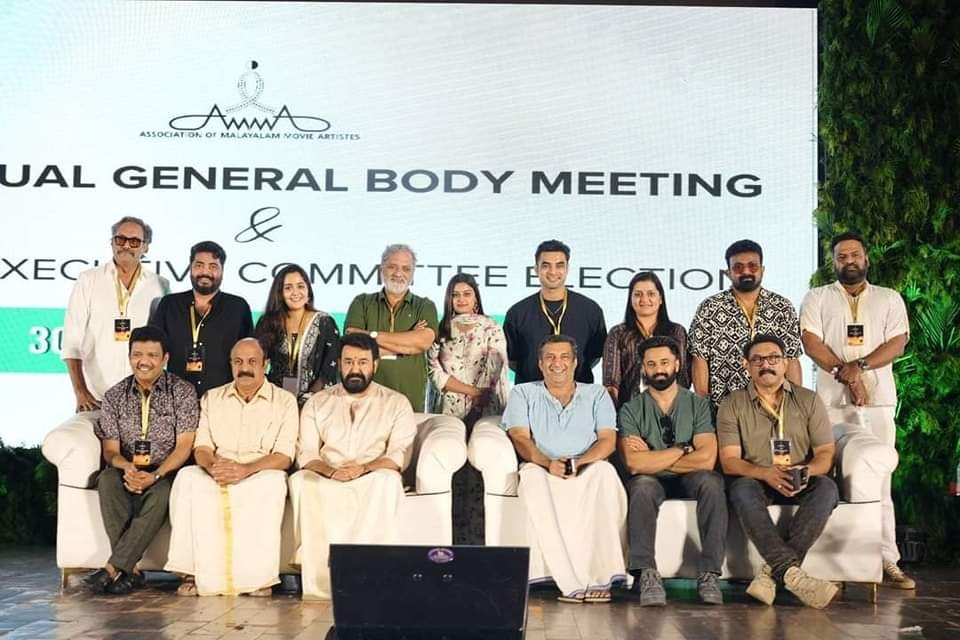
AMMA Executive Committee Members (2024–2027), before the committee's dissolution following allegations of misconduct, August 2024.

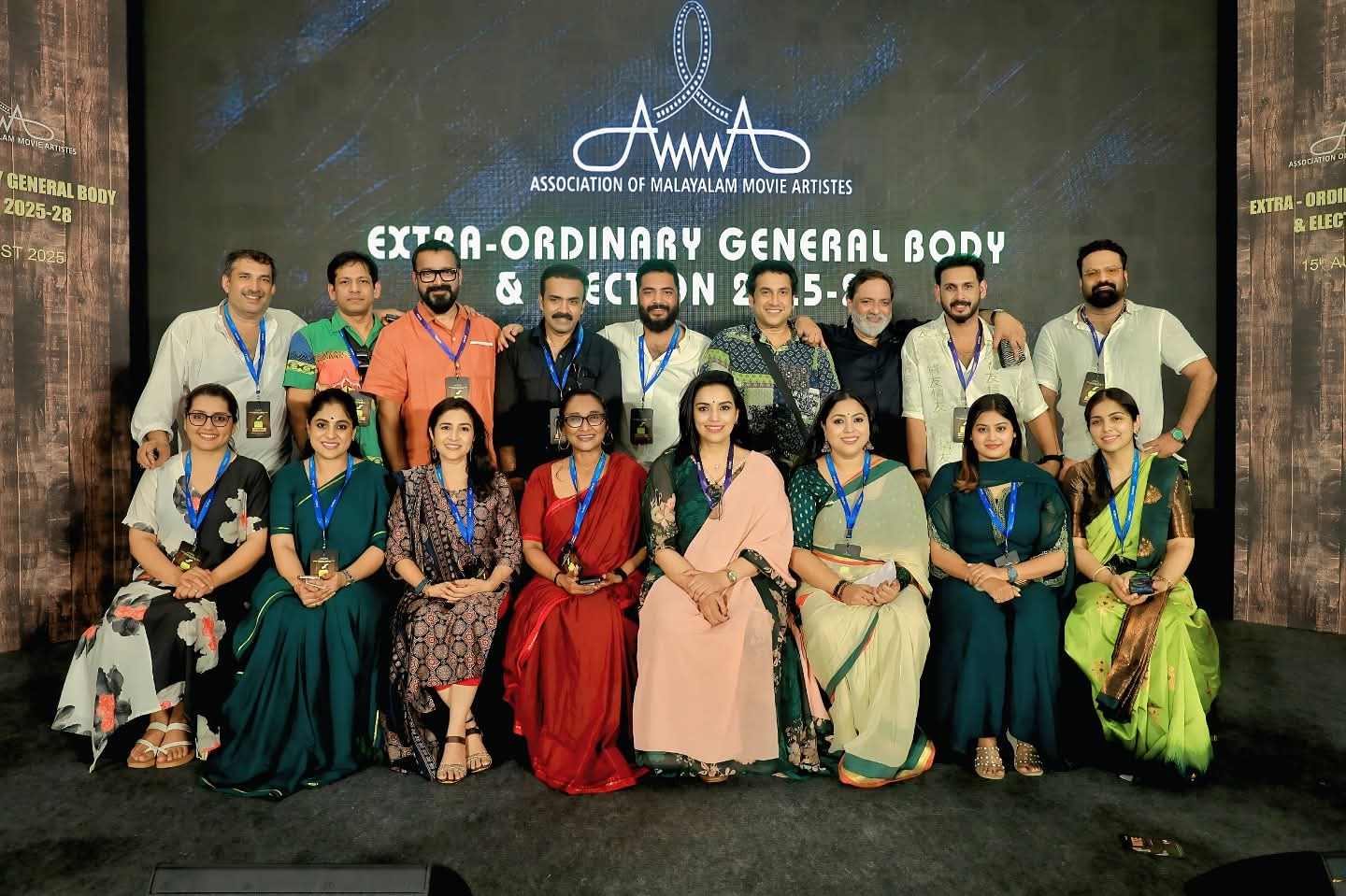
AMMA Executive Committee Members (2025–2028)

== List of AMMA leadership ==
Year	President	Vice President	General Secretary	Secretary	Joint Secretary	Treasurer	Executive Committee Members
2025–2028 (Dissolved in 2026)	Shwetha Menon	Jayan Cherthala and Lakshmi Priya	Cuckoo Parameswaran	-	Ansiba Hassan	Unni Sivapal	Joy Mathew, Tini Tom, Vinu Mohan, Sarayu Mohan, Kailash, Rony David, Santhosh Keezhattoor, Neena Kurup, Anjali Nair, Asha Aravind and Sijoy Varghese
2024–2027 (Dissolved in 2024)	Mohanlal	Jagadish and Jayan Cherthala	Siddique (Resigned)	-	Baburaj	Unni Mukundan (Resigned)	Kalabhavan Shajon, Suraj Venjarammoodu, Joy Mathew, Suresh Krishna, Tini Tom, Ananya, Vinu Mohan, Tovino Thomas, Sarayu Mohan, Ansiba Hassan and Jomol (Dissolved)
2021–2024	Mohanlal	Shwetha Menon and Maniyanpilla Raju	Edavela Babu	-	Jayasurya	Siddique	Sudheer Karamana, Surabhi Lakshmi, Baburaj, Tovino Thomas, Manju Pillai, Tini Tom, Unni Mukundan, Lena, Rachana Narayanankutty and Lal
2018–2021	Mohanlal	-	Edavela Babu	Siddique	Mukesh and K. B. Ganesh Kumar	Jagadish	Indrans, Baburaj, Asif Ali, Honey Rose, Aju Varghese, Jayasurya, Rachana Narayanankutty, Shwetha Menon, Muthumani, Sudheer Karamana, Tini Tom and Unni Shivapal
2015–2018	Innocent	Mohanlal and K. B. Ganesh Kumar	Mammootty	Edavela Babu	-	Dileep	Asif Ali, Cuckoo Parameswaran, Devan, Kalabhavan Shajohn, Maniyanpilla Raju, Mukesh, Nedumudi Venu, Nivin Pauly, Remya Nambeesan and Siddique
2012–2015	Innocent	K. B. Ganesh Kumar and Dileep	Mohanlal	Edavela Babu	-	Kunchacko Boban	Nedumudi Venu, Devan, Lalu Alex, Lal, Siddique, Suraj Venjaramoodu, Jayasurya, Indrajith Sukumaran, Kavya Madhavan, Lena and Cuckoo Parameswaran
2009–2012	Innocent	K. B. Ganesh Kumar and Mukesh	Mohanlal	Edavela Babu	-	Jagadish	Mammootty, Dileep, Cuckoo Parameswaran, Samvrutha Sunil, Indrajith Sukumaran, Jayasurya, Kunchacko Boban, Maniyanpilla Raju, Nedumudi Venu, Siddique and Vijayaraghavan
2006–2009	Innocent	Dileep and Nedumudi Venu	Mohanlal	-	Edavela Babu	Mukesh	Bindu Panicker, Cuckoo Parameswaran, Cochin Haneefa, Harisree Ashokan, Kunchacko Boban, Maniyanpilla Raju, Rajan P. Dev, Sai Kumar, Siddique, V. K. Sreeraman and Vijayaraghavan
2003–2006	Innocent	K. B. Ganesh Kumar and Nedumudi Venu	-	Mohanlal (Hon.)	Edavela Babu and T. P. Madhavan	Jagadish	Sukumari, Baiju Santhosh, Biju Menon, Dileep, Harisree Ashokan, Kalabhavan Mani, Mamukkoya, Maniyanpilla Raju, Mukesh and Siddique
2000–2003	Innocent	Mohanlal and Suresh Gopi	-	Mammootty (Hon.)	T. P. Madhavan and Suchitra Murali / Edavela Babu (acting)	Jagadish	Jayaram, Mukesh, Sreenivasan, Nedumudi Venu, Captain Raju, Maniyanpilla Raju, K. B. Ganesh Kumar, Siddique, Edavela Babu and Ashokan
1997–2000	Madhu	Suresh Gopi and Rajan P. Dev	-	Balachandra Menon and Raghavan	Jagathy Sreekumar and Suchitra Murali	K. B. Ganesh Kumar	Janardhanan, Devan, Kalpana, K. P. A. C. Lalitha, Mamukkoya, Manoj K. Jayan, Mukesh, Murali, Maniyanpilla Raju and Vijayaraghavan
1994–1997	M. G. Soman	Mammootty and Mohanlal	-	T. P. Madhavan	Venu Nagavally	Jagadish	Sukumari, Balachandra Menon, K. B. Ganesh Kumar, Innocent, Madhu, Maniyanpilla Raju, Murali, Nedumudi Venu, Sreenivasan, Suresh Gopi and Cochin Haneefa

== Public contributions ==
- The association contributed ₹50 lakh to the Chief Minister's Distress Relief Fund, to extend its support during the 2018 Kerala floods.
- The AMMA along with Asianet conducted a stage show in Abu Dhabi in December 2018 to raise ₹5 crore for the Chief Minister's Distress Relief Fund.

== Hema committee report ==
In August 2024, the Association of Malayalam Movie Artistes (AMMA) found itself at the center of a storm when the long-awaited Justice Hema Committee report was finally released to the public, following a Kerala High Court order. This report, which had been kept under wraps since its completion in 2019, shed light on the severe challenges and discrimination faced by women in the Malayalam film industry. The committee, formed in 2017 in the aftermath of the shocking abduction and sexual assault of a prominent actress, was tasked with investigating the working conditions of women in the industry.

The report's findings were deeply troubling, revealing a male-dominated industry where misogyny is not only pervasive but institutionalized. The committee's investigation uncovered the existence of a powerful "mafia" within the industry, comprising a small group of influential male actors, directors, and producers who effectively control the industry's operations. This group was found to have significant control over AMMA, the leading industry organization, dictating its decisions and suppressing any attempts to challenge their authority.

Women in the industry, especially actresses, were found to be particularly vulnerable. The report documented numerous instances of sexual harassment, coercion, and exploitation. For example, actresses testified about being forced to repeatedly perform intimate scenes under duress and facing threats when they resisted. The casting couch was reported to be rampant, with new and aspiring actresses often pressured into compromising situations in exchange for roles. The report also highlighted that women producers and those in smaller roles were frequently at the mercy of the male-dominated power structure, facing discrimination and even being denied basic amenities like quality food on set unless they complied with demands.

The Justice Hema Committee also pointed out the ineffectiveness of the Internal Complaints Committees (ICCs) on film sets, which are supposed to address issues of sexual harassment. These committees were found to be largely symbolic, with little real power or will to protect the interests of women. As a result, many women were left without recourse, forced to endure mistreatment or risk being blacklisted from the industry (Telangana Today).

Despite the damning nature of the report, its release was delayed by the Kerala government for several years, leading to widespread criticism. When it was finally made public, key details, including the names of those accused, were redacted, which many saw as an attempt to protect influential figures in the industry. This has led to calls for greater transparency and accountability, with some demanding a judicial inquiry into the allegations and the implementation of the report's recommendations.

The recommendations of the Justice Hema Committee include the establishment of a tribunal with judicial powers to address issues of sexual harassment and contract breaches, mandatory written contracts for all workers in the industry, and gender sensitivity training for those in leadership roles. The committee also emphasized the need for greater representation of women in decision-making roles within AMMA and the industry at large.

As the industry grapples with the fallout from the report, there is growing pressure on AMMA and the Kerala government to take concrete steps to address these issues. The revelations have sparked widespread outrage, not just within the film community but also among the general public, leading to renewed debates about the need for systemic reforms in the Malayalam film industry.

Following the publication of the report, an audio clip of a junior actress naming the late veteran comedian Mamukkoya, the once popular actors Sudheesh, Idavela Babu and Saju Kodiyan as actors who solicited sex from her while she was a struggling director, surfaced in the media.

The first response from AMMA came as a press meet on 25 August, with General Secretary Siddique, and executive members Jayan Cherthala, Jomol, and Ananya downplaying the allegations as isolated incidents.

Shortly after that an actress who had earlier in 2019, accused Siddique of raping her, quickly slammed his pretentious statement to the press. The actress claimed that Siddique had called her to discuss a film but then raped her from the hotel room. As she narrated in gruesome detail how the popular actor had described his fetish over long fingers like hers, fantasized verbally about "licking her if not allowed to penetrate", even suggestively eating food in front of her, shocking the Malayali audience, Siddique was forced to resign from his position of General Secretary of AMMA overnight.

Following the flurry of revelations and accusations that seemed to spare no one, acclaimed actor Mohanlal resigned as the president of AMMA, along with all the members of the executive committee, submitting a joint resignation on 27 August. The committee appears to have been dissolved, though a couple of women members later stated that they have not submitted their resignation. A new committee is expected to be formed after an election within two months, until which time the current committee shall serve as caretakers.

== Controversies ==
- In February 2010, after his exclusion from Christian Brothers (2011), Thilakan announced that members within AMMA had conspired and denied him work. The executive members of AMMA convened multiple meetings to hear his complaints. Since Thilakan did not attend those meetings and continued to publicly defame the association, he was expelled. After Thilakan died, his son Shammi Thilakan, a member of AMMA, requested the AMMA leadership to reconsider and reinstate his father's membership posthumously.
- In March 2017, based on the petition by director Vinayan in 2012, Competition Commission of India (CCI), imposed a total fine of ₹11.25 Lakhs on the AMMA and Film Employees Federation Of Kerala (FEFKA) for denying opportunities for Vinayan, preventing artists from co-operating with Vinayan, and rejecting his films from theaters.
- In July 2017, actor Dileep was removed from AMMA's primary membership after he was charged and arrested for criminal conspiracy in a criminal assault case. He was expelled from actors' guild and lost his primary membership in AMMA.
- In August 2024, actor Siddique resigned as General Secretary of AMMA following allegations of sexual harassment made by an actress. He stepped down after the accusations surfaced, citing his inability to continue in the role amidst the controversy.
- On 27 August 2024, following the release of the Hema Committee report, which detailed allegations from female artists and workers from the Malayalam Cinema, the Association of Malayalam Movie Artists (AMMA) dissolved its entire executive committee for the period 2024–2027.

When Dileep was released on bail, his membership was reinstated by AMMA, claiming his removal was not legally valid as per the laws of the committee. The claim was primarily made by K. B. Ganesh Kumar.

Protesting the lukewarm approach in expelling Dileep, few actresses protested and resigned from AMMA membership. They formed a group named Women in Cinema Collective (WCC). WCC protested through a series of social media interventions that AMMA should take a favorable stand towards the welfare of the female actors in Malayalam cinema. In light of these events, AMMA General body meeting conducted in 2021 revised its bylaws; including more women in the executive body; and established an internal complaints committee for the welfare of women.
