= Hema Committee report =

Report by the Kerala government on women workers

Hema Committee was an advisory committee formed by the Government of Kerala in July 2017, to investigate the issues related to sexual violence and gender inequality, in the Malayalam cinema industry and to submit solutions to them. The three-member committee was chaired by former Kerala High Court judge Justice Hema. Film actress & politician Sarada and former IAS officer KB Vatsalakumari, were the other members of the committee. The committee was formed when the Women in Cinema Collective (WCC), an organization formed after a young actress, who was assaulted in 2017 in Kochi, complained to Chief Minister Pinarayi Vijayan.

The committee, which started functioning on 16 November 2017, consulted multiple women professionals in the Malayalam film industry and recorded detailed statistics on sexual harassment, earned wages and blacklisting from work. A 300-page report, which came to be known as the Hema Committee Report was submitted to Pinarayi Vijayan in December 2019, along with the documents, audio and video evidence supporting the findings.

== History ==
The committee was headed by the former judge of Kerala High Court, Justice retired K. Hema, to investigate the concerns of sexual harassment and gender discrimination in Malayalam cinema. The report was submitted to the government on 31 December, 20 but not released to the public. No action was taken by the Kerala government (First Vijayan Ministry & Second n Ministry) from December 2019 to July 2024.

On 6 July 2024, the Kerala State Information Commission passed an order directing the Kerala government to issue the committee report to RTI applicants before 22 July, after redacting information that could identify individuals mentioned in the report, as prohibited under the Right to Information Act. On 19 August 2024, the report was made available to the RTI applicants after the Kerala High Court, on Tuesday, 13 August, upheld the order of the State Information Commission and allowed for the release of the Justice Hema Committee report, determining that there was no breach of privacy.

The Kerala government released only 233 pages of the report, excluding sections that could infringe on the privacy of the individuals mentioned. The omitted portions include paragraphs 97 to 107 from pages 49 to 53, as well as sections from pages 81 to 100 and pages 165 to 196. According to Manorama News, the 11 paragraphs from pages 49 to 53 were not part of the exclusions submitted by the State Information Commission. The report reveals the existence of an all-male power group of 15 top people in the industry, including directors, producers and actors in the Malayalam industry. According to the report, the power group determined who should stay in the industry and who would be cast in films.

== Reactions ==
Following the Hema Committee Report, numerous actresses and other female workers in the Malayalam film industry came forward to share their harrowing experiences with various industry figures:

1. Bengali actress Sreelekha Mitra revealed a disturbing encounter with Malayalam film director Ranjith Balakrishnan. In response to these allegations, Ranjith resigned from his position as Chairman of the Kerala State Chalachitra Academy. The alleged incident occurred during the production of the 2009 film Paleri Manikyam: Oru Pathirakolapathakathinte Katha.
2. An actress disclosed inappropriate behaviour from Malayalam film actors Siddique and Riyaz Khan. Subsequently, Siddique stepped down as General Secretary of the Association of Malayalam Movie Artists (AMMA).
3. Geetha Vijayan shared her negative experiences with Malayalam film director Thulasidas and producer Aroma Mohan during the filming of Chanchattam in 1991.
4. Sridevika also recounted a distressing encounter with Malayalam film director Thulasidas while working on the film Avan Chandiyude Makan in 2007.
5. An anonymous young scriptwriter came forward with allegations against Malayalam film director V. K. Prakash.
6. An actress alleged that Malayalam film actors Jayasurya, Maniyanpilla Raju, and Edavela Babu exhibited inappropriate behaviour towards her during the production of a film in Kochi in 2014. Additionally, she claimed that actor Mukesh demanded sexual favours in exchange for a membership in the Association of Malayalam Movie Artists (AMMA).
7. A junior artist shared a negative experience with Malayalam film actor-producer Baburaj Jacob.
8. A junior artist, recounted a negative interaction her friend's mother had with the Malayalam actor Mukesh.
9. A man from Kozhikode has filed a sexual abuse complaint against film director Ranjith Balakrishnan. According to him, Ranjith had also claimed to the victim about the involvement of a lady whom Ranjith had referred to as Revathy.
10. A casting couch sexual assault case filed against actor Nivin Pauly. He has denied the whole allegations, calls it "entirely untrue" and he has assured full cooperation with any investigation. Later Nivin petitioned Police Chief and SIT demanding probe into "fake complaints". Later Nivin got clean chit from court that he was innocent.
11. An actress filed a sexual harassment case against actor Alencier Ley Lopez.

On 27 August 2024, following the release of the Hema Committee report, which detailed allegations from female artists and workers from the Malayalam Cinema, the Association of Malayalam Movie Artists (AMMA) dissolved its entire executive committee for the period 2024–2027. Mohanlal, who had by then secured his second term as president of that organisation, was the head of the executive committee who had to step down.

Many, including Prakash Raj acknowledged how deeply engrained harassment of women was across film industries, and the need to start working on the same. "There has been abuse on you, we have been silent and we are sorry. And we have to continue to be sorry for a very long time," he said at the Wayanad Literature Fest (2024).

== Aftermath ==
The Government of Kerala has set up a Special Investigation Team (SIT) to probe sexual harassment allegations in the Malayalam film industry. The SIT, led by IG G. Sparjan Kumar and consisting of four senior women IPS officers, will have ADGP H. Venkitesh overseeing its operations.

The team comprises S. Ajeetha Begum, DIG; Merin Joseph, SP, Crime Branch; G. Poonkuzhali, AIG, Coastal Police; Aiswarya Dongre, Assistant Director, Kerala Police Academy; V. Ajith, AIG, Law and Order; and S. Madhusoodanan, SP, Crime Branch.

Following Kerala's Hema committee, similar proposal for setting up a committee in West Bengal's Bengali cinema has been proposed to the Chief Minister.
