= Theatre: The Myth of Reality =

2025 Indian-Malayalam language film

Theatre
- Directed by: Sajin Baabu
- Written by: Sajin Baabu
- Produced by: Anjana Philip; Philip Zacharia
- Starring: Rima Kallingal; Sarasa Balussery
- Cinematography: Syamaprakash M. S.
- Edited by: Appu N. Bhattathiri
- Music by: Saeed Abbas
- Production company: Anjana Talkies
- Distributed by: Sree Priya Combines
- Release dates: 9 October 2025 (Yalta); 16 October 2025 (India)
- Running time: 138 minutes
- Country: India
- Language: Malayalam

Theatre: The Myth of Reality is a 2025 Indian Malayalam-language mystery film written and directed by Sajin Baabu. The film stars Rima Kallingal and Sarasa Balussery in the lead roles. It is produced by Anjana Philip and Philip Zacharia under the banner Anjana Talkies and co-produced by Santhosh Kottayi. Syamaprakash M. S. handles the cinematography and Appu N. Bhattathiri edits the film. Saeed Abbas composes the songs and background score. The film explores the fragile boundaries between myth and reality, while bringing to life the fading traditions and mystical undercurrents of Kerala.

Theatre had its world premiere on 9 October 2025 at the Eurasian Bridge International Film Festival, Yalta. It was released theatrically on 16 October 2025. The film received positive reviews from critics. The film won two Kerala Film Critics Association Awards – Best Actress and a Special Jury Award.

== Cast ==
- Rima Kallingal
- Sarasa Balussery
- Dain Davis
- Pramod Veliyanad
- Krishnan Balakrishnan
- Mekha Rajan
- Ann Saleem
- Balaji Sarma
- Akhil Kavalayoor
- Meenakshi Raveendran
- Ashwathy B.
- Arun Sol
- Ratheesh Rohini
- Fijo Philip
- Thanseer Kamar
- Bilas Chandrahasan
- Lakshmi Padma
- Gincy Chinnappan
- Reena Indrayani
- Thamanna Sol
- Abraham Vadakkan

== Soundtrack ==
Theatre

Soundtrack album by Saeed Abbas
- Released: 2025
- Genre: Feature film soundtrack
- Length: 4:03
- Language: Malayalam
- Label: Muzik 247

The soundtrack album of the film is composed by Saeed Abbas.

No.	Title	Lyrics	Singer(s)	Length
1.	"Mudiyaattupaattu"	Adwaith B. Kumar	Adwaith B. Kumar	00:45
2.	"Pulluvan Paattu"	Mohanan Pulluvan	Parvathi Devi, Shabarinath, Rama Chandran, Narayanan	03:18
Total length:				04:03

== Release ==
The trailer of the film was launched at the Marché du Film on 13 May 2025. The trailer was released online on 3 October 2025. Theatre has screened in the International Competition Section at the Eurasian Bridge International Film Festival, Yalta on 9 October 2025. It is scheduled to release theatrically on 16 October 2025.

The makers of the film organised a campaign titled #UnwrittenByHer to honour women who carved unconventional paths and created unique spaces for themselves in society. Minister Saji Cherian was the chief guest at the event held in Thiruvananthapuram on 3 October 2025.

The film was released on ManoramaMAX OTT on 20 February 2026.

== Reception ==
=== Critical reception ===
Theatre: The Myth of Reality received positive reviews from critics.

Princy Alexander of Onmanorama praised the cast performance, music, and praised for delving into the themes of social media influence, sexual exploitation, sexual revolution, and nudity "with a certain boldness." She wrote, "Overall, the film thoughtfully explores a range of themes, provoking reflection while maintaining a strong grip on the viewer’s attention."

Sreejith Mullapilly of The New Indian Express rated the film 1.5/5 stars and wrote that Theatre: The Myth of Reality fails to allow the audience to form an emotional connection with the main characters or confront its harsh truths, undermining its potential impact. While the director leaves the film's big ideas open to interpretation, the movie's intimate premise is spoiled by the procedural nature of the middle act. Ultimately, the film never really allows the audience to form any sort of emotional connection with any of the main characters and suffers from a lack of focus.

Anandu Suresh of The Indian Express rated the film 3/5 stars, praising cinematography, editing, music, sound design, the cast performance of Rima Kallingal and Sarasa Balussery. However, he noted that the narrative having too many elements left many aspects half-cooked and only superficially addressed. He felt the film gave little attention to other significant issues, which affects the film's cohesive impact.

Anjana George of The Times of India rated the film 3/5 stars and wrote, "Is it the story of two women, or the story of how we look at women? Is it a critique of capitalism or a participant in its spectacle? Does it liberate its women or merely aestheticise their suffering? Perhaps, like the island it portrays, the film itself stands suspended, beautiful, conflicted, and caught between faith and fantasy."

Sruthi Ganapathy Raman of The Hollywood Reporter characterised the film as "A moving social commentary" and wrote, "The Malayalam film, through the story of an isolated mother-daughter unit, nudges us to look beyond the optics of social media, and for the truth."

== Accolades ==
Kerala Film Critics Association Awards

- Best Actress - Rima Kallingal
- Special Jury Award - Pramod Veliyanad
