= KochuKadavu =

Kochukadavu Kochukadavu
- Village
- Location in Kerala, India Kochukadavu (India)
- Coordinates: 10.188693°N 76.308330°E
- Country: India
- State: Kerala
- District: Thrissur district

Languages
  - Official: Malayalam, English
- Time zone: UTC+5:30 (IST)
- PIN: 680734

Kochukadavu is a village in southern part of Thrissur district. Which is situated in Kuzhoor Grama Panjayath,Kochukadavu is a small village located near the Chalakudy River in the Thrissur district of Kerala, India. It is known for its scenic beauty, paddy fields, and traditional Kerala lifestyle.As per estimates, Kochukadavu has a population of around 1,500–2,000 residents. The main language spoken is Malayalam, while English is used in education and administration. The majority of the residents belong to Muslim Hindu and Christian communities, living harmoniously with a mix of cultural traditions. under Mala Block Panjayath..
