= Women in Cinema Collective =

Indian organization for women in Malayalam cinema

WCC
- Women in Cinema Collective
- Founded: 1 November 2017; 8 years ago
- Headquarters: Building No. XXI/152, Cochin University, Kochi, Kerala, India
- Location: India
- Website: wccollective.org

Women in Cinema Collective, abbreviated as WCC, is an organisation for women working in the Malayalam cinema industry, founded in November 2017. Among other achievements, the Hema committee was formed by the Government of Kerala in 2017 following a request by WCC to investigate problems faced by women in the Malayalam film industry. The Hema report was finally published in August 2024.

== History ==
Following the sexual assault case involving a prominent film actress, who was allegedly abducted and assaulted by a colleague in the industry, the actor Dileep, on 18 May 2017, a group of women who later formed the WCC submitted a petition to the Chief Minister of Kerala, requesting an inquiry and prompt action on the case.

WCC began as an informal WhatsApp support group for the victim of the assault, which grew and transformed into the collective. On 1 November 2017, Women in Cinema Collective Foundation (WCC) was registered as a society in Kerala.

WCC publicly condemned the decision of AMMA to reinstate actor Dileep, when the matter was still sub judice.

Actor Parvathy Thiruvothu, a member of Association of Malayalam Movie Artists and WCC, was one of the first to openly state that films with misogynist dialogues should not be encouraged. She named the senior actor Mammootty's film Kasaba (2016) as one such movie. She requested that senior actors like Mammootty who is much respected and has a wide fan base should refrain from acting in films that have such misogynistic scripts, for the betterment of the society at large. Parvathy's viewpoint received some support from the film fraternity, but much criticism, and she became the victim of cyberbullying. She was viciously trolled and abused by the actor's fans, two of whom were arrested by the Kerala Police following a complaint from Parvathy.

== Description and location ==
The organisation aims to bring social awareness against misogyny practices, and intends to be the unified voice for the welfare of women artists by promoting gender neutral practices in the Malayalam movie industry.

The WCC headquarters are in Building No. XXI/152 at Cochin University, Kalamassery, Ernakulam, Kochi.

== Activities ==
=== Major achievements ===
Women in Cinema Collective sought the intervention of Kerala High Court to ensure formation of Internal Complaints Committees (ICC) and strict implementation of Protection of Women from Sexual Harassment at Workplace (PoSH) Act, 2013 in all Malayalam film production units. Kerala High Court announced the verdict to adhere to the PoSH Act in all film units - which was a significant milestone after the establishment of WCC.

Hema committee formed by the state government to study the problems faced by women in Malayalam film industry, was a direct result of WCC's request to the Chief Minister. The committee submitted its report in December 2019 but the 290-page report was only made available to the public in August 2024. The report described 17 forms of exploitation faced by women in the film industry including sexual harassment by male actors and unleashed a major political storm in the state upon its release.

At the Wayanad Literature Festival, Parvathy Thiruvothu noted that the WCC is a sign of progress, where women are able to speak up about their experiences, and how there are people to listen.

=== PK Rosy Film Society ===
In 2019, the WCC launched a film society in tribute to P. K. Rosy, the first actress in a Malayalam film, called the PK Rosy Film Society. Headed by an all-women panel of 11 women who are executive members of the WCC, the society aims to include all those who have been excluded from cinema history and industry because of their gender, class, religion, or caste. It is only the fourth all-women film society (out of a total of 170) in India, and the first to be run by women film professionals.

=== Other activities ===
- Punarvaayana, a year-long series of events, was intended to address and raise awareness in society on issues such as exclusionary workspaces, workplace exploitation and gender discrimination. It brought together prominent and successful women from various fields — including media people, lawyers, bureaucrats, politicians, and social activists – to discuss these matters.
- WCC celebrates the role of women in cinema by holding exhibitions and announcing end-of-year awards for Malayalam Cinema that pass the Bechdel Test.
- In 2017 WCC members requested the intervention of the government to formalise wage structure and welfare schemes for women working in the film industry, such as maternity pay and tax subsidies for production crews that have at least 30% women representation, among many others.
- WCC requested the Government of Kerala to start more movie production related technical courses that provides direct employment opportunities for more women and provide for more women's reservations in government-owned studios.

== Similar initiatives ==
Film Employees Federation of Kerala (FEFKA) rolls out its own women's wing, chaired by Bhagyalakshmi, who is critical of WCC for being selective in its approach. The new women's wing is described as a platform where concerns of women technicians can be voiced, with the women's wing acting as arbitrators to sort them out.
