= List of Malayalam films of 2022 =

This is a list of Malayalam films that released in 2022.

== January–March ==
Opening		Title	Director	Cast	Production company / Studio	Ref
J A N U A R Y	1	Baby Sam	Jeevan Bose	Mithun Ramesh, Anjali Nair, Naseer Sankranthi, Master Ayush, Rithu P. Rajan	Wings Entertainments and Cinema	
J A N U A R Y	1	RJ Madona	Anand Krishna Raj	Amalendu K. Raj, Anil Anto, Shersha Sherif, Jijo Jacob, Nileen Sandra, Jai Vishnu	Hitchcock Entertainment	
J A N U A R Y	2	Nisabdham	Raghunath N. B.	Krishna Praba, Raghu Gopi	Avishkara Digital	
J A N U A R Y	7	Station 5	Prashanth Kanathur	Indrans, Dayana Hameed, Santhosh Keezhattoor, Shivaji Guruvayoor, Rajesh Sharma, Sunil Sukhada, Priyamvada Krishnan	Map Film Factory	
J A N U A R Y	7	Levya 20:10	Nandan Menon	Nincy Xavier, Sooryalal, Akhil S. Kumar, Aneesh Anand	Live INC, N 4 Film Factory	
J A N U A R Y	7	Randu	Sujith Lal	Vishnu Unnikrishnan, Anna Rajan, Mamitha Baiju, Tini Tom, Mareena Michael Kurisingal, Musthafa, Irshad	Heavenly Movies Private Ltd.	
J A N U A R Y	7	Super Sharanya	Girish A. D.	Anaswara Rajan, Mamitha Baiju, Arjun Ashokan, Antony Varghese, Naslen K. Gafoor	Shebin Backer Productions, Stuckcows	
J A N U A R Y	13	Audi Plus	Master Manaf Adinadu	G. K. Vinod Kumar, Nujoob, Benhar, Sajeev, Manzeer, Ajith, Jibin, Sandra, Indhulekha	DK Movie	
J A N U A R Y	14	Meppadiyan	Vishnu Mohan	Unni Mukundan, Kalabhavan Shajon, Saiju Kurup, Lena, Aju Varghese, Anju Kurian, Arya	Unni Mukundan Films	
J A N U A R Y	14	Sathyam Mathrame Bodhippikku	Sagar	Dhyan Sreenivasan, Sreejith Ravi, Sudheesh, Ambika, Johny Antony	Smruthi Cinemas	
J A N U A R Y	14	Swami Saranam	Vijayakumar	Shivaji Guruvayoor, Neena Kurup, Geetha Vijayan, Jefry Shidharaj, Bhama, K. G. Vijayakumar	Siddhi Vinayak Films, Vyajayanthi Creations	
J A N U A R Y	18	Arangu Thalam Akkarakke	Kavilraj	Kavilraj, Kalamandalam Nandakumar, Jacob Simon, Kalamandalam Parameswaran, Unnikrishnan, Deepthi Mayannoor, Anusree Ajayakumar	Cini Friends Creations	
J A N U A R Y	18	Vishnukavyam	Alex Sharon Babu	Sruthy, Alex, Pratheesh, Aby	Rayce Entertainment	
J A N U A R Y	20	Nerippodu	Hari Narayanan, Prajith Cherukodu	Bibin Benny, Anand Bodh, Surendran Kaliyath, Vishnu Balakrishnan, Neerada, Geethu, Basker Aravind	Matuag Productions, Malayalam Box Office	
J A N U A R Y	21	B. Abu	Zubair Madayi	Anwar Babu, Ashique Mahe, Bindu K. Menon, Jilna Sumesh, Tazim Zubair	One 2 One Media	
J A N U A R Y	21	Bhoothakaalam	Rahul Sadasivan	Shane Nigam, Revathy, Saiju Kurup, Athira Patel	Plan T Films, Shane Nigam Films	
J A N U A R Y	21	Hridayam	Vineeth Sreenivasan	Pranav Mohanlal, Kalyani Priyadarshan, Darshana Rajendran, Arun Kurian	Merryland Cinemas	
J A N U A R Y	21	Kannadi	A. G. Rajan	Siddique, Rahul Madhav, Mamukoya, Vijayaraghavan, Rachana Narayanankutty, Margret Antony	Naduvattam Productions	
J A N U A R Y	26	Bro Daddy	Prithviraj Sukumaran	Mohanlal, Prithviraj Sukumaran, Meena, Kalyani Priyadarshan, Nikhila Vimal, Kaniha, Lalu Alex, Soubin Shahir	Aashirvad Cinemas	
J A N U A R Y	27	Thirimali	Rajiv Shetty	Bibin George, Swastima Khadka, Johny Antony, Dharmajan Bolgatty, Anna Rajan, Naseer Sankranthi, Hareesh Kanaran, Innocent	Angel Maria Cinemas	
J A N U A R Y	27	Mirchi Masala	Rajesh Kannankara	Jayan Cherthala, Sajna, Sreelakshmi, Akhilesh, Bismi, Lekshmi	Aishani Films	
F E B R U A R Y	4	Karnan Napoleon Bhagath Singh	Sarath G. Mohan	Dheeraj Denny, Aadhya Prasad, Indrans, Joy Mathew, Nandu, Vijaya Kumar, Rony David Raj, Eldho Mathew, Althaf Salim, Aneesh Gopal	First Page Entertainment	
F E B R U A R Y	10	Thullal Prapanjam	Balaji Nagalassery	Kalasree Kala Vasudevan Master, Sreela Nalledam	Theertham Production	
F E B R U A R Y	11	Archana 31 Not Out	Akhil Anilkumar	Aishwarya Lekshmi, Indrans, Ramesh Pisharody	Chavara Films, Newspaper Boy	
F E B R U A R Y	11	Freedom Fight	Jeo Baby, Akhil Anilkumar, Kunjila Mascillamani, Jithin Issac Thomas, Francies Louis	Joju George, Rajisha Vijayan, Srindaa, Sidhartha Siva, Unni Lalu, Rohini	Symmetry Cinemas, Mankind Cinemas	
F E B R U A R Y	11	Kallan D’Souza	Jithu K. Jayan	Soubin Shahir, Dileesh Pothan, Surabhi Lakshmi, Hareesh Kanaran	Ramshi Ahmed Productions, Ruby Films, World Wide Films	
F E B R U A R Y	18	Aaraattu	B. Unnikrishnan	Mohanlal, Nedumudi Venu, Shraddha Srinath, Saikumar, Sampath Raj, Neha Saxena, Malavika Menon	RD Illuminations, Hippo Prime Motion Pictures, Movie Pay Media's, Zee Studios	
F E B R U A R Y	25	Member Rameshan 9aam Ward	Aby Treesa Paul, Anto Jose Periera	Arjun Ashokan, Gayathri Ashok, Chemban Vinod Jose, Indrans, Mareena Michael Kurishinkal	Boban and Moly Entertainments	
F E B R U A R Y	25	Team D	Ambady Dinil	Ananthu Bharathan, Sruthy, Shaju Machad, Jomon	Dhanush Films	
F E B R U A R Y	25	Upacharapoorvam Gunda Jayan	Arun Vaiga	Saiju Kurup, Shabareesh Varma, Siju Wilson	Wayfarer Films	
F E B R U A R Y	25	Veyil	Sarath	Shane Nigam, Shine Tom Chacko, Suraj Venjaramoodu, Sona Olickal, Sreerekhaa	Goodwill Entertainments	
M A R C H	3	Bheeshma Parvam	Amal Neerad	Mammootty, Nedumudi Venu, Sreenath Bhasi, Shine Tom Chacko, K. P. A. C. Lalitha, Soubin Shahir, Farhaan Faasil, Nadhiya Moidu	Amal Neerad Productions	
M A R C H	3	Naaradan	Aashiq Abu	Tovino Thomas, Anna Ben, Sharafudheen, Indrans	OPM	
M A R C H	3	Geetha	Cocktales Entertainments	Neeraja S. Pillai, Rahul Pallath, Harikrishnan Sharu	Anon Trendz	
M A R C H	11	Night Drive	Vysakh	Indrajith Sukumaran, Roshan Mathew, Anna Ben, Siddique, Muthumani, Ranji Panicker, Kalabhavan Shajon	Aan Mega Media	
M A R C H	11	Pada	Kamal K. M.	Kunchako Boban, Joju George, Vinayakan, Dileesh Pothan, Prakash Raj, Unnimaya Prasad	AVA Productions, E4 Entertainment	
M A R C H	11	Alli	Rajkumar S.	Saji Venjaramoodu, Biju Sopanam, Aparna Mohan, Neena Kurup	High Five Films	
M A R C H	17	Devika: Neither Virgin Nor Goddess	Jibin George James	Maanav, Athira Madhav, Gayathri Suresh	Focus Film Studio	
M A R C H	17	Salute	Rosshan Andrrews	Dulquer Salmaan, Manoj K. Jayan, Diana Penty, Saniya Iyappan	Wayfarer Films	
M A R C H	18	Anandakalyanam	P. C. Sudheer	Ashkar Soudaan, Archana, Bijukuttan, Neena Kurup, Kottayam Pradeep, Shivaji Guruvayoor, Leela	Zebra Media	
M A R C H	18	God Bless You	Vijeesh Vasudev	Harisree Yousuf, Neena Kurup, Kottayam Pradeep	Full Team Cinemas, Areswaram Cinemas	
M A R C H	18	Lal Jose	Kabeer Puzhambram	Shariq, Ann Andrea, Bhagath Manuel, Devi Ajith	666 Productions	
M A R C H	18	Lalitham Sundaram	Madhu Warrier	Manju Warrier, Biju Menon, Saiju Kurup, Sudheesh, Anu Mohan	Manju Warrier Productions	
M A R C H	18	Oruthee	V. K. Prakash	Navya Nair, Drishya Dinesh, Vinayakan, Saiju Kurup	Benzy Productions	
M A R C H	18	Pathrosinte Padappukal	Afzal Abdul Latheef	Sharaf U Dheen, Naslen K. Gafoor, Grace Antony, Shammi Thilakan, Ranjitha Menon, Dinoy Paulose	Marikar Entertainments	
M A R C H	18	Screenplay	Mehamood K. S.	Prasanth Kanjiramattom, Pragaya, Ranjith Kalabhavan, Aleena, Razak Paradise Ismail, Rafeeq Chokli, Radhika	Century Vision	
M A R C H	18	Twenty One Gms	Bibin Krishna	Anoop Menon, Renji Panicker, Leona Lishoy, Anu Mohan, Ranjith, Manasa Radhakrishnan, Mareena Michael Kurisingal	The Front Row Productions	
M A R C H	25	Escape	Sarshick Roshan	Gayathri Suresh, Sreevidya Mullachery, Santhosh Keezhattoor, Anugraha, Shaju Sreedhar, Disney James, Anu Joseph	SR Big Screen Entertainment	
M A R C H	25	Thirayozhiyathe	Manoj Krishna Ambalathara	Hashim, Shana Sunil, Kozhikode Narayanan Nair, Kozhikode Jayaraj, Jayachandran Kottakochi, Athira Baburaj	Rudhra Annapoorna	
M A R C H	30	Generations	Tijo Thadathil	Athulya Ullas	P&B Media Creations	

== April–June ==
Opening		Title	Director	Cast	Production company / Studio	Ref
A P R I L	7	Aviyal	Shanil	Joju George, Anaswara Rajan, Alexander Prasanth, Dain Davis, Ketaki Narayan, Sinil Sainudheen	Pocket SQ Productions	
A P R I L	8	Gramavrikshathile Kuyil	K. P. Kumaran	Srevalsan J Menon, Pramod Raman, Gargi Ananthan, Rahul Rajagopal	Far Sight Media	
A P R I L	8	Ente Mazha	Sunil Subramaniam	Manoj K. Jayan, Nedumudi Venu, Narain, Yami Sona	Anmay Creations	
A P R I L	8	Kaypakka	K. K. Menon	Rahul Ravi, Nithya Ram Vinaya Prasad, Sonia Agarwal, Sajitha Betti	Porus Cinemas	
A P R I L	8	Moori	Anitta Augustine	Sajith Thoppil, Seema G. Nair	Mekkunnel Films	
A P R I L	8	Origami	Binoy Pattimattom	Santhosh Keezhattoor, Shivaji Guruvayoor, James Parakkal, Beena Kaveri	Pushkas Entertainments	
A P R I L	9	Aquarium	T. Deepesh	Sunny Wayne, Honey Rose, V. K. Prakash	Kannambeth Productions	
A P R I L	14	Myself Clement	S. S. Jishnu Dev	Gautham S Kumar, Jinu Celine, Manasaprabhu, Sasikanthan, Sunil Kumar, Jalatha Bhaskaran, Jainendrakumar	Varaaha Films	
A P R I L	15	Avasthantharangal	Shaji Thejus	Shaji Thejus	Thejus Creations	
A P R I L	15	Premarogi	Pradeep Eloor	Pradeep Eloor, Pradeesh Cherthala, Mahesh Aravindan, Sumesh Thacchandan, Amal Mohan, Rithu, Diya, Midha, Neeraja	Lucky Films	
A P R I L	15	Swargavathil Pakshikal	Shibu Attingal	Rakesh M Roshan, Mubeer Khan, Diana, Jayanthi Singh, Nimisha Nair, Anil R Thampi	Serene Arts Films	
A P R I L	22	Anthakshari	Vipin Das	Saiju Kurup, Priyanka Nair, Sudhi Koppa, Vijay Babu, Shabareesh Varma, Binu Pappu	Sulthan Brothers Entertainments	
A P R I L	22	No Way Out	Nithin Devidas	Ramesh Pisharody, Dharmajan Bolgatty, Basil Joseph, Raveena Nair	Remo Entertainmentz	
A P R I L	22	Thee Mazha Then Mazha	Kunjumon Thaha	Jagathy Sreekumar, Rajesh Cobra, Soorja Sajan, Lakshmi Priya	Seven Birds Films	
A P R I L	28	Jana Gana Mana	Dijo Jose Antony	Prithviraj Sukumaran, Suraj Venjaramoodu, Mamta Mohandas, Dhruvan	Magic Frames	
A P R I L	29	Makal	Sathyan Anthikkad	Jayaram, Sreenivasan, Meera Jasmine, Naslen K. Gafoor, Devika Sanjay, Sree Dhanya	Central Pictures	
M A Y	1	CBI 5: The Brain	K. Madhu	Mammootty, Renji Panicker, Mukesh, Ramesh Pisharody, Soubin Shahir, Kaniha, Asha Sharath, Malavika Menon, Ansiba Hassan	Swargachithra Films	
M A Y	2	Third World Boys	Ayyappa Swaroop	Soubin Shahir, Sreenath Bhasi, Shine Tom Chacko	Little Big Films	
M A Y	3	Ikkakka	Sainu Chavakkadan	Pradeep Babu, Saju Navodaya, Shivaji Guruvayoor, Ashwathi, Heera Thulasi, Gopu Krishna, Kalabhavan Nandana	High Hopes Film Factory	
M A Y	6	Kshanikam	Rajeev Rajendran	Jewel Mary, Nandu	R-Productions Filmy	
M A Y	12	Puzhu	Ratheena P. T.	Mammootty, Nedumudi Venu, Parvathy Thiruvothu, Indrans, Malavika Menon	Cyn-Cyl Celluloid	
M A Y	13	Jo and Jo	Arun D. Jose	Mathew Thomas, Nikhila Vimal, Naslen K. Gafoor	Imagine Cinemas, Signature Studios	
M A Y	13	Meri Awas Suno	Prajesh Sen	Jayasurya, Manju Warrier, Sshivada, Johny Antony	Universal Cinemas	
M A Y	13	Pathaam Valavu	M. Padmakumar	Indrajith Sukumaran, Suraj Venjaramoodu, Aditi Ravi, Swasika, Ajmal Ameer	UGM Productions, Mumbai Movie Studios	
M A Y	20	12th Man	Jeethu Joseph	Mohanlal, Unni Mukundan, Anusree, Anu Sithara, Saiju Kurup, Rahul Madhav, Aditi Ravi, Priyanka Nair, Leona Lishoy, Anu Mohan, Chandhunadh, Sshivada,	Aashirvad Cinemas	
M A Y	20	Ammakanal	Rajesh Vadacode	Sabu Joseph, Kaladi Omana	Krishna Productions	
M A Y	20	Four	Sunil Hanif	Amal Shah, Mamitha Baiju, Minon	Bloom International	
M A Y	20	Jack N' Jill	Santhosh Shivan	Manju Warrier, Soubin Shahir, Kalidas Jayaram, Nedumudi Venu, Aju Varghese	Sree Gokulam Movies, Sevas Pictures	
M A Y	20	Keedam	Rahul Riji Nair	Rajisha Vijayan, Sreenivasan, Vijay Babu	First Print Studios, Fairy Frames	
M A Y	20	Trojan	Dr. Jiss Thomas	Krishna Shankar, Sheelu Abraham, Devan, Shabareesh Varma, Athira Madhav	Silver Blise Movie House	
M A Y	20	Udal	Ratheesh Raghunandan	Dhyan Sreenivasan, Indrans, Durga Krishna	Sree Gokulam Movies	
M A Y	20	Varayan	Jijo Joseph	Siju Wilson, Leona Lishoy, Maniyanpilla Raju	Sathyam Cinemas	
M A Y	27	Bachelors	A. P. Syam Lenin	Levin Simon Joseph, Sadikha Venugopal, Saikumar Sudevan	Think Beyond Production	
M A Y	27	Elmer	Gopi Kuttikol	Santhosh Keezhattoor, Master Dev Rajeshwar	Raj Govind Production	
M A Y	27	John Luther	Abhijith Joseph	Jayasurya, Deepak Parambol, Siddique, Tanvi Ram, Aditi Ravi	Alonsa Films	
M A Y	27	Kalachekon	K. S. Hariharan	Sudheer Karamana, Shivaji Guruvayoor, Devan, Bheeman Raghu	Santhi Matha Creation	
M A Y	27	Kuttavum Shikshayum	Rajeev Ravi	Asif Ali, Sharaf U Dheen, Sunny Wayne, Srindaa, Alencier Ley Lopez	Film Roll Productions	
M A Y	27	Maahi	Suresh Kuttiadi	Aneesh Menon, Gayathri Suresh, Devan	VSDS Entertainments	
M A Y	27	Son of Alibaba Nalapathonaman	Najeeb Ali	Rahul Madhav, Shivaji Guruvayoor, Bineesh Bastin, Lishoy	Filim Fort Media Lab	
M A Y	28	The Proposal	Joe Joseph	Joe Joseph, Amara Raja, Clair Sara Martin, Anumodu Paul, Suhas Pattathil, Karthika Menon Thomas, Sana Subedi	Silver Cloud Pictures	
J U N E	3	Onnu	Anupama Menon	Jojan Kanjani, Rathi Kumar, Sajeev Madhav	Kerala Visual Sign, KSFDC	
J U N E	3	Thattukada Muthal Cemetery Vare	Siraj Fantasy	Jagadish, Shreya Ramesh, V.K. Baiju, Sunil Sukhada	Online Movies	
J U N E	3	Welcome to Pandimala	Mubeen Rauf	Suraj Sundar, Kripa Shekar	Harichanda Creations	
J U N E	9	Innale Vare	Jis Joy	Asif Ali, Reba John, Antony Varghese, Nimisha Sajayan	Central Advertising Agency	
J U N E	10	Chekkan	Shafi Eppikkad	Vinod Kovoor, Thesni Khan, Vishnu Purushan, Nanjiyamma	One 2 One Media	
J U N E	10	Dear Friend	Vineeth Kumar	Tovino Thomas, Darshana Rajendran, Arjun Lal, Arjun Radhakrishnan, Basil Joseph, Sanchana Natarajan	Happy Hours Entertainments, Aashiq Usman Productions	
J U N E	10	Kochaal	Shyam Mohan	Murali Gopy, Indrans, Krishna Shankar, Shine Tom Chacko	Sierra Talkies	
J U N E	11	Vazhiye	Nirmal Baby Varghese	Jefin Joseph, Aswathi Anil Kumar, Varun Ravindran	Casablanca Film Factory	
J U N E	17	Heaven	Unni Govindraj	Suraj Venjaramoodu, Sudev Nair, Reshmi Boban, Sudheesh, Devi Menon, Joy Mathew	Cut 2 Create Pictures	
J U N E	17	Kidnap	Pramod Mohan	Arun Sagara, Firozkhan, Dhanusha	Kolaikal Movies	
J U N E	17	Prakashan Parakkatte	Shahad Nilambur	Mathew Thomas, Dhyan Sreenivasan, Nisha Sarang, Dileesh Pothan, Aju Varghese	Funtastic Films	
J U N E	17	Vaashi	Vishnu G. Raghav	Tovino Thomas, Keerthy Suresh, Kottayam Ramesh, Baiju Santhosh	Revathy Kalamandhir, Urvasi Theatre	
J U N E	17	Viddikalude Mashu	Anish V. A.	Dilip Menon, Anjali Nair, Maniyanpilla Raju, Shari, Manobala	Headz Presents	
J U N E	24	Bheethi	Vinod	Krishna Prabha, Krishnan, Nasif Appu, Dr. Bashith Nakulan, Unni Raj Cheruvathoor	Studio Mojo	
J U N E	24	Panthrand	Leo Thaddeus	Vinayakan, Dev Mohan, Lal, Shine Tom Chacko, Srindaa, Veena Nair, Sreelatha Namboothiri	Skypass Entertainment	
J U N E	24	Porkkalam	Chotta Vipin	Santhosh Keezhattoor, Kiran, Varsha	Alleppey Films	
J U N E	24	Priyan Ottathilanu	Antony Sony	Sharaf U Dheen, Nyla Usha, Aparna Das, Jaffar Idukki, Mammootty	Wow Cinemas	
J U N E	24	Sudokku`N	C. R. Ajayakumar	Ranji Panickar, Maniyanpilla Raju, Narayanankutty, Shankaran	Sangeetha 4 Creations	

== July–September ==
Opening		Title	Director	Cast	Production company / Studio	Ref
J U L Y	1	Adithattu	Jijo Antony	Sunny Wayne, Shine Tom Chacko, Alexander Prasanth, Jayapalan, Joseph Yesudas	Middle March Studios, Kanayil Films	
J U L Y	1	A Violent Tale	Arun Lal	Jithin PG, Shyamprasad S, Abhilash S, Teena Joseph, Midhun Haridas	Empty Company Productions	
J U L Y	1	EMI	Jobi John	Sunil Sukhada, Jayan Cherthala, Yami Sona, Manju Pathrose, Rony David	Joji Films	
J U L Y	1	Santacruz	Johnson John Fernandez	Aniish RRehhman, Noorin Shereef, Aju Varghese, Rahul Madhav, Indrans, Major Ravi, Vidyalakshmi	Chitteth Film House	
J U L Y	1	Ullasam	Jeevan Jojo	Shane Nigam, Aju Varghese, Ambika, Pavithra Lakshmi, Sarayu, Deepak Parambol	Kaithamattom Brothers	
J U L Y	6	Paka: The River of Blood	Nithin Lukose	Basil Paulose, Vinitha Koshy, Athul John, Jeph Stephan Johnson	Studio 99 Films	
J U L Y	7	Kaduva	Shaji Kailas	Prithviraj Sukumaran, Vivek Oberoi, Arjun Ashokan, Samyuktha Menon	Prithviraj Productions, Magic Frames	
J U L Y	8	In	Rajesh Nair	Deepti Sati, Arya, Madhupal, K. K. Menon	Vaya Films, Senn Production	
J U L Y	8	Madappally United	Ajay Govind	Hareesh Peradi, Savithri Sreedharan, Srikant Murali, Renji Kankol	Caroline Pictures	
J U L Y	8	Pyali	Babitha, Rinn	Sreenivasan, Appani Sarath, Mamukkoya, Barbiee Sharma	NF Varghese Pictures, Wayfarer Films	
J U L Y	10	Breakup Party	A. R. Amal Kannan	Viswa Mohan, Sangeetha Padhma	All Is Well Cinemas	
J U L Y	10	Turning Point	Shaiju N.	Rajesh Sharma, P.J. Unnikrishnan, Vijayakumari, Deepa Rakhi George, Vanitha Shoba	Creative Kollam	
J U L Y	15	Ela Veezha Poonchira	Shahi Kabir	Soubin Shahir, Sudhi Koppa, Jude Anthany Joseph, Vincent Vadakkan, Vishnu Venu	Kadhaas Untold	
J U L Y	15	Padma	Anoop Menon	Anoop Menon, Surabhi Lakshmi, Shruthi Rajanikanth	Anoop Menon Storyz	
J U L Y	21	Mahaveeryar	Abrid Shine	Asif Ali, Nivin Pauly, Shanvi Srivastava, Siddique, Lal, Lalu Alex Mallika Sukumaran	Pauly Jr. Pictures, Indian Movie Makers	
J U L Y	22	Kuri	K. R. Praveen	Vishnu Unnikrishnan, Surabhi Lakshmi, Vishnu Govindhan, Aditi Ravi, Sagar Surya	Kokers Media Entertainments	
J U L Y	22	Malayankunju	Sajimon Prabhakaran	Fahadh Faasil, Rajisha Vijayan, Arjun Ashokan, Deepak Parambol, Indrans, Jaffar Idukki	Fahadh Faasil & Friends	
J U L Y	28	Kadal Paranja Kadha	Sainu Chavakkadan	Sunil Aravind, Ankit George, Anagha S, Aparna Nair, Sreelakshmi Iyyer	Jet Media Production House	
J U L Y	29	19(1)(a)	Indhu V. S.	Vijay Sethupathi, Indrajith Sukumaran, Nithya Menen, Atulya Ashadam, Deepak Parambol, Arya Salim	Anto Joseph Film Company	
J U L Y	29	Headmaster	Rajeevnath	Babu Antony, Devi, Sanju Sivram, Manju Pillai, Prem Kumar	Channel 5	
J U L Y	29	Paappan	Joshiy	Suresh Gopi, Gokul Suresh, Neeta Pillai, Nyla Usha, Asha Sharath, Kaniha, Ajmal Ameer	David Kachappilly Productions, Iffaar Media	
J U L Y	29	Thaniye-Alone	Shyju John	Minu Mohan, Baby Ananya Pradeep, Master Adwaith P Nair	Fly Wings Media	
A U G U S T	1	Chalachithram	Gafoor Elliyas	Sudarshan Alleppey, Moses Sunday Oyelere, Oluwatosin Folayan Oyelere	Chalachithram Production	
A U G U S T	4	Aavasavyuham	Krishand R. K.	Nileen Sandra, Sreenath Babu, Zhinz Shan, Sanup Padaveedan, Geethi Sangeetha, Nikhil Prabhakar, Manu Bhadran	1830 Crew Films	
A U G U S T	5	Pothum Thala	Anil Karakkulam	Saju Navodaya, Neena Kurup, Shivaji Guruvayoor, Sunil Sukhada	Valappan Creations	
A U G U S T	5	Sabaash Chandrabose	V. C. Abhilash	Vishnu Unnikrishnan, Johny Antony, Jaffar Idukki, Sneha, Ramya Suresh	Jollywood Movies	
A U G U S T	5	Sayanna Varthakal	Arun Chandu	Dhyan Sreenivasan, Gokul Suresh, Aju Varghese, Sharanya Sharma, Makarand Deshpande	D14 Entertainments	
A U G U S T	5	Two Men	K. Satheesh	M. A. Nishad, Renji Panicker, Lena, Anumol, Arya, Irshad Ali	D Group	
A U G U S T	11	Nna Thaan Case Kodu	Ratheesh Balakrishnan Poduval	Kunchacko Boban, Gayathrie, Basil Joseph, Rajesh Madhavan	Moonshot Entertainment	
A U G U S T	12	College Cuties	A. K. B. Kumar	Kulappulli Leela, Shivaji Guruvayoor, Devan, Nimisha Nair, Narayanankutty, Anay Sathyan	AKB Movie International	
A U G U S T	12	Holy Wound	Ashok. R. Nath	Janaki Sudheer, Amrita Vinod, Sabu Praudeen	Sahasrara Cinemas	
A U G U S T	12	Thallumaala	Khalid Rahman	Tovino Thomas, Kalyani Priyadarshan, Shine Tom Chacko, Chemban Vinod Jose	Aashiq Usman Productions, Plan B Entertainments	
A U G U S T	12	Uthami	S. P. Suresh Kumar	Gayathri Suresh, Raji Menon	Ashtag Films	
A U G U S T	13	Apsara	Syam Krishnan	Alan Chiramel, Akhila Rajan	100 Stories Pictures	
A U G U S T	18	February 29	Devan Nagalassery	Shivaji Guruvayoor, Salman Kkm, Dhanya Kannur	Sensation Films	
A U G U S T	18	Solamante Theneechakal	Lal Jose	Joju George, Vincy Aloshious, Darshana Sudarshan Nair	LJ Films	
A U G U S T	19	Mathukuttiyude Vazhikal	Biju M. Raaj	Kailash, Naiha Nihar	Cheruvelickal Films	
A U G U S T	19	Mike	Vishnu Sivaprasad	Anaswara Rajan, Ranjith Sanjeev, Abhiram Radhakrishnan, Rohini, Jinu Joseph	JA Entertainment	
A U G U S T	19	Simon Daniel	Sajan Antony	Vineeth Kumar, Divya Pillai, V. K. Sreeraman	Migress Productions	
A U G U S T	19	Thee	Anil V. Nagendran	Muhammed Muhsin, Indrans, Ramesh Pisharody, Vinu Mohan, Prem Kumar	UV Creations, Visard Creations	
A U G U S T	19	Ulkkanal	Yateendradas	Sai Kumar, Ambika Mohan, Nanjiyamma	Devi Tripurambika	
A U G U S T	25	Kudukku 2025	Bilahari	Krishna Sankar, Rammohan Ravindran, Aju Varghese, Swasika, Durga Krishna, Shine Tom Chacko	Bilahari Experiments, S.V. Krishnasankar Productions, Ram De Studios	
A U G U S T	25	Theerppu	Rathish Ambat	Prithviraj Sukumaran, Indrajith Sukumaran, Saiju Kurup, Isha Talwar, Hanna Reji Koshy	Friday Film House	
A U G U S T	26	Attention Please	Jithin Isaac Thomas	Vishnu Govindan, Sreejith Babu, Anand Manmadhan	Stone Bench Films, Mangoes N' Coconuts	
A U G U S T	26	Beyond the 7 Seas	Pratheesh Uthaman, Smily Thomas	Prashant Nair	ASDM	
A U G U S T	26	Kottakkulam Payyans	Sudhi Kadalundi Nagaram	Abu Salim, Shobi Thilakan, Vijayan Karanthur, Anilbaby, Devaraj	Calicut Kalakshetra Productions	
A U G U S T	26	Neepa	Benny Asamsa	Salim Kumar, Babu Antony, Johny Antony	Himuchri Creations	
A U G U S T	26	Peace	Sanfeer K.	Joju George, Asha Sarath, Ramya Nambeesan, Anil Nedumangad, Aditi Ravi, Siddique	Script Doctor Pictures	
A U G U S T	26	Sreedhanya Catering Service	Jeo Baby	Gilu Joseph, Phantom Praveen, Anna Fathima, Vyshnavi Kalyani	Mankind cinemas	
A U G U S T	31	Bonamy	Tony Sukumar	Sidhartha, Anjali, Vakkanadu Suresh, Shailaja Ambu, Shajahan Sukumaran, Prasanth Wagamon	Koyas Productions	
S E P T E M B E R	2	Avengers	Mehamood K. S.	Salim Bava, Nimisha Bijo, Aleena Binson	Century Vision	
S E P T E M B E R	2	Palthu Janwar	Sangeeth P. Rajan	Basil Joseph, Indrans, Johny Antony, Shammi Thilakan, Jaya Kurup, Athira Harikumar	Working Class Hero, Bhavana Studios	
S E P T E M B E R	2	Run Kalyani	Geetha J.	Garggi Ananthan, Meera Nair, Manoj Menon	AkamPuram Production	
S E P T E M B E R	2	Sundari Gardens	Charlie Davis	Neeraj Madhav, Aparna Balamurali, Vijayaraghavan	Allens Media	
S E P T E M B E R	4	WFH (Work From Home)	K. P. Nambiathiri	Riyaz Khan, Rajeev Pillai, Shivani Bhai, Bose Venkat	First Shows	
S E P T E M B E R	8	Oru Thekkan Thallu Case	Sreejith	Biju Menon, Nimisha Sajayan, Roshan Mathew, Padmapriya Janakiraman	E4 Entertainment, New Surya Films	
S E P T E M B E R	8	Ottu	Felini T. P.	Kunchacko Boban, Aravind Swamy, Jackie Shroff, Eesha Rebba	August Cinema	
S E P T E M B E R	8	Pathonpatham Noottandu	Vinayan	Siju Wilson, Chemban Vinod Jose, Madhuri Braganza, Anoop Menon, Senthil Krishna, Renu Soundar	Sree Gokulam Movies	
S E P T E M B E R	16	King Fish	Anoop Menon	Anoop Menon, Ranjith, Durga Krishna	Texas Film Factory	
S E P T E M B E R	16	Ulkazhcha	Bijoy Bahuleyan	Anjali Nair, Ambika Mohan, Krishna Praba	Saraswathy Films	
S E P T E M B E R	16	Kotthu	Sibi Malayil	Asif Ali, Roshan Mathew, Nikhila Vimal, Ranjith	Gold Coin Motion Picture	
S E P T E M B E R	16	Vishuda Mejo	Kiran Antony	Dinoy Paulose, Mathew Thomas, Lijomol Jose	Plan J Studios	
S E P T E M B E R	23	Chattambi	Abhilash S. Kumar	Sreenath Bhasi, Chemban Vinod Jose, Grace Antony	Art Beat Studios	
S E P T E M B E R	23	Karmasagaram Visuddha Chavarayachan	Aji K. Jose	Maqbool Salman, Poojitha Menon, Kottayam Ramesh		
S E P T E M B E R	23	Koshichayante Parambu	Saajir Sadaf	Jaffar Idukki, Salim Kumar, Reena Basheer, Geethi Sangeethika	Sandra Performs	
S E P T E M B E R	23	Ormakalil	M. Vishwapratap	Shankar, Deepa Kartha, Poojitha Menon	Premier Cinemas	
S E P T E M B E R	23	Vellarikkapattanam	Maneesh Kurup	Tony Sigimon, Janvi Byju, Jayan Cherthala, M. R. Gopakumar	Mangalasseril Movies	
S E P T E M B E R	30	Joshua Mosayude Pingami	Sudheesh Mohan	Akhilesh Easwar, Midhun Abraham, Anjana Sara, Amrutha Vijai	Cahiers Du Cinemas	
S E P T E M B E R	30	Mei Hoom Moosa	Jibu Jacob	Suresh Gopi, Poonam Bajwa, Srinda	Confident Group, Thomas Thiruvalla Films	
S E P T E M B E R	30	Muri	Aryakrishnan R. K.	Manu Murali, Venus Paul	Mathew production, Soulmate Production	
S E P T E M B E R	30	Ninam	Amardeep	Suryakrishna, Nandan Kalabhavan, Sarath Harisree	Movie Today Creations	

== October–December ==
Opening		Title	Director	Cast	Production company / Studio	Ref
O C T O B E R	4	Eesho	Nadirshah	Jayasurya, Namitha Pramod	Arun Narayan Productions	
O C T O B E R	7	Ini Utharam	Sudheesh Ramachandran	Aparna Balamurali, Kalabhavan Shajohn, Jaffar Idukki, Siddharth Menon	A&V Entertainments	
O C T O B E R	7	Rorschach	Nisam Basheer	Mammootty, Sharaf U Dheen, Kottayam Nazeer, Jagadish, Sanju Sivram, Grace Antony, Bindu Panicker, Babu Annur	Mammootty Kampany, Wayfarer Films	
O C T O B E R	7	Siddy	Pious Raj	Aji John, I. M. Vijayan, Rajesh Sharma, Akshaya Udayakumar, Divya Gopinath, Haritha Haridas	Surya Film Productions	
O C T O B E R	14	My Name is Azhakan	B. C. Naufal	Binu Thrikkakkara, Sharanya Ramchandran, Sudhi Koppa, Tini Tom	Truth Films	
O C T O B E R	14	Oru Pakka Nadan Premam	Vinod Nettathani	Vinu Mohan, Vidhya Mohan, Kulappulli Leela, Madhupal	Ans Productions	
O C T O B E R	14	PK Rosy	Sasi Nadukkadu	Jayan Cherthala, Aristo Suresh, Bheeman Raghu	GS Films	
O C T O B E R	14	Shubhadhinam	Shivaram Mony	Indrans, Gireesh Neyyar, Mareena Michael Kurisingal, Hareesh Kanaran	Neyyar Films	
O C T O B E R	14	Varaal	Kannan Thamarakulam	Anoop Menon, Prakash Raj, Sunny Wayne, Priyanka Nair	Time Ads Entertainment	
O C T O B E R	14	Vichithram	Achu Vijayan	Balu Varghese, Shine Tom Chacko	Joy Movie Productions	
O C T O B E R	20	Samroha	Nithin Narayan	Riyaz Khan, Renjith Kumar, Ajikumar, Salim Punalur	Ranar Arts	
O C T O B E R	21	Monster	Vysakh	Mohanlal, Lakshmi Manchu, Honey Rose, Johny Antony, Sudev Nair	Aashirvad Cinemas	
O C T O B E R	21	Padavettu	Liju Krishna	Nivin Pauly, Aditi Balan, Shine Tom Chacko	Yoodlee Film, Sunny wayne Production	
O C T O B E R	27	Adiyaan	Nithin Noble	Prasanth Murali, Zaira Backer	Interstellar Cinemas	
O C T O B E R	28	5il Oral Thaskaran	Soman Ambat	Indrans, Kalabhavan Shajon, Hareesh Peradi, Renji Panicker, Shravana RS	Jayashree Cinema	
O C T O B E R	28	Appan	Maju	Sunny Wayne, Grace Antony, Ananya, Alancier Ley Lopez, Pauly Valsan	Sunny Wayne Productions, Tiny Hands Productions	
O C T O B E R	28	Autorickshawkarante Bharya	Harikumar	Suraj Venjaramoodu, Ann Augustine, Kailash, Swasika	Benzy Productions	
O C T O B E R	28	Jaya Jaya Jaya Jaya Hey	Vipin Das	Darshana Rajendran, Basil Joseph, Manju Pillai, Aju Varghese, Azees Nedumangad	Scooper Dooper Films, Cheers Entertainment	
O C T O B E R	28	Kumari	Nirmal Sahadev	Aishwarya Lekshmi, Shine Tom Chacko, Surabhi Lakshmi	Prithviraj Productions, Magic Frames	
N O V E M B E R	4	Chathuram	Sidharth Bharathan	Roshan Mathew, Swasika, Alencier Ley Lopez, Santhy Balachandran	Greenwitch Entertainments, Yellow Bird Productions	
N O V E M B E R	4	Ellaam Settanu	Vinu Sridhar	Bipin Jose, Sumesh Chandran, Rajeev Rajan, Sneha Bhagyesh	Amsterdam Movie International	
N O V E M B E R	4	Kooman	Jeethu Joseph	Asif Ali, Renji Panicker, Baiju Santhosh, Pauly Valsan	Magic Frames, Ananya Films	
N O V E M B E R	4	Saturday Night	Rosshan Andrrews	Nivin Pauly, Saniya Iyappan, Siju Wilson, Grace Antony, Aju Varghese	Ajith Vinayaka Films	
N O V E M B E R	11	Etham	Praveen Chandran	Sravana TN, Siddharth Rajan, Prakash Bare	Screen Creations	
N O V E M B E R	11	Mukundan Unni Associates	Abhinav Sunder Nayak	Vineeth Sreenivasan, Suraj Venjaramoodu, Jagadish, Aarsha Chandini Baiju, Tanvi Ram, Sudhi Koppa	Joy Movie Productions	
N O V E M B E R	11	Nishiddho	Tara Ramanujan	Kani Kusruti, Tanmay Dhanania	Kerala State Film Development Corporation	
N O V E M B E R	11	Thattaassery Koottam	Anoop Padmanabhan	Arjun Ashokan, Ganapathi S. Poduval, Vijayaraghavan, Aneesh Gopal	Graand Production	
N O V E M B E R	12	The Dark Secret	Jomon George & Sabu Mani	Santhosh Keezhattoor, Tony O'Sullivan	Magic Triangle Films	
N O V E M B E R	18	1744 White Alto	Senna Hegde	Sharaf U Dheen, Vincy Aloshious, Rajesh Madhavan, Arun Kurian, Sminu Sijo	Kabinii Films	
N O V E M B E R	18	Adrishyam	Zac Harris	Sharaf U Dheen, Joju George, Narain, Anandhi, Athmiya Rajan	AAAR Productions, Film House UAN	
N O V E M B E R	18	Akashathinu Thazhe	Lijeesh Mullezhathu	Kalabhavan Prajod, Siji Pradeep	Amma Films	
N O V E M B E R	18	Paykappal	Mohammed Rafi	Indrans, Surabhi Lakshmi, Meera Vasudevan, Suresh Krishna	Eranadu Films	
N O V E M B E R	18	Perfume - Her Fragrance	Haridas	Tini Tom, Kaniha, Pratap Pothen, Praveena	Moti Jacob Production	
N O V E M B E R	18	Sholai	Siju Mon Kamar	Ayan Adhi, Deppthi Rajesh, Sneha Vijeesh, Aneesh Khan	Manna Movies	
N O V E M B E R	18	Signature	Manoj Palodan	Tini Tom, Karthik Ramakrishnan, Alphy Panjikkaran, Chembil Ashokan, Shaju Sreedhar	Sanjose Creations, Deluxe Cinemas	
N O V E M B E R	18	Vivaaha Aavahanam	Sabu Alumoottil	Aju Varghese, Alexander Prasanth, Niranj Maniyanpilla Raju, Nitaarah Nadin, Sabumon Abdusamad	Karmic Studio, Chand Studio	
N O V E M B E R	19	Aghora	Prabhan Chand	Vinod Kovoor, Glovin Issac, Ramadevi	Aafreen Cinemas	
N O V E M B E R	20	Devil's Bark	Soman Kallikkattu	Aju Irapuram, Bibin Omegha, Vidhu Kallikkattu, Dean Arvin	YARAS Family Entertainment	
N O V E M B E R	24	Padachone Ingalu Katholi	Bijith Bala	Sreenath Bhasi, Ann Seethal, Hareesh Kanaran, Grace Antony, Johny Antony	Tiny Hand Production	
N O V E M B E R	25	4 Years	Ranjith Sankar	Sarjano Khalid, Priya Prakash Varrier	Dreams N Beyond	
N O V E M B E R	25	Aanaparambile World cup	Nikhil Premraj	Antony Varghese, Balu Varghese, Jumana Abdu Rahman, Archana Vasudev, Saiju Kurup, Manoj K. Jayan, I. M. Vijayan, Sreeja Das	Achappu Movie Magic, Mass Media Production	
N O V E M B E R	25	Gila Island	Manu G. Krishna	Indrans, Kailash, Anagha Maria Varghese	Root Productions	
N O V E M B E R	25	Haasyam	Jayaraj	Harisree Ashokan, K. P. A. C. Lalitha, Sabitha Jayaraj, Ullas Pandalam	Epoch Films	
N O V E M B E R	25	Haya	Vasudev Sanal	K R Bharath, Chaithania Prakash, Akshaya Udayakumar, Guru Somasundaram, Johny Antony	Six Silver Souls Studio	
N O V E M B E R	25	Louis	Shabu Usman	Indrans, Manoj K. Jayan, Divya Pillai, Joy Mathew	Koottupallil Movies Productions	
N O V E M B E R	25	Shefeekkinte Santhosham	Prabhan Chand	Unni Mukundan, Manoj K. Jayan, Divya Pillai, Bala, Athmiya Rajan, Shaheen Siddique	Unni Mukundan Films	
D E C E M B E R	1	Gold	Alphonse Puthren	Prithviraj Sukumaran, Deepti Sati, Nayanthara, Ajmal Ameer	Prithviraj Productions, Magic Frames	
D E C E M B E R	2	Khedda - The Trap	Manoj Kana	Asha Sharath, Uthara Sharath, Sudheer Karamana, Sudev Nair	Benzy Productions	
D E C E M B E R	2	Maadan	R. Sreenivasan	Kottarakkara Radhakrishnan, Harshitha Nair, Milan, Anamika	Sreejith Cinemas	
D E C E M B E R	2	Oru Jaathi Manushyan	K. Shameer	Sharook Shameer, Sneha Das S, Fairuz Kamarudheen, Anjana Pallath, Shivaji Guruvayoor, Niyas Backer	Way To Cinema Entertainments	
D E C E M B E R	2	Poriveyil	Farook Abdul Rahman	Indrans, Surabhi Lakshmi	Movie Connoisseurs Society	
D E C E M B E R	2	Prathi Niraparadhiyaano	Sunil Pottammal	Indrans, Nalanda Pradeep, Sunil Sukhada, Abha Shajith, Hareesh Peradi	Volcano Cinemas	
D E C E M B E R	2	Saudi Vellakka - CC225/2009	Tharun Moorthy	Binu Pappu, Lukman Avaran, Devi Varma, Vincy Aloshious, Sujith Shankar	Urvashi Theaters	
D E C E M B E R	2	The Teacher	Vivek	Amala Paul, Hakkim Shah, Manju Pillai, I. M. Vijayan	Nutmeg Productions	
D E C E M B E R	9	Bharatha Circus	Sohan Seenulal	Binu Pappu, Shine Tom Chacko, M. A. Nishad, Sunil Sukhada	Bestway Entertainments	
D E C E M B E R	9	I Am A Father	Raju Chandra	VP Anupama, K Maheen	Vayakodan Movie Studio, Plan Studios Pvt Ltd.	
D E C E M B E R	9	Madhuram Ee Jeevitham	Anil Philip	Prakash Bare, Bhagyalakshmi	Chavara Media House	
D E C E M B E R	9	Red Shadow	Jollymas	Baby Akshaya, Remesh Kumar, Manu Mohan, Deepa Surendran	Film Art Media House	
D E C E M B E R	9	Roy	Sunil Ibrahim	Suraj Venjaramoodu, Shine Tom Chacko, Sija Rose, Rony David	Sony Liv, Coconut Bunch Creations	
D E C E M B E R	9	State Bus	Chandran Narikkode	Santhosh Keezhattoor, Siby Thomas, Vijilesh Karayad	Studio C Cinemas	
D E C E M B E R	9	Veekam	Sagar Hari	Dhyan Sreenivasan, Aju Varghese, Muthumani, Sheelu Abraham, Jagadish	Abaam Movies	
D E C E M B E R	16	Ariyippu	Mahesh Narayanan	Kunchacko Boban, Divya Prabha, Danish Husain, Loveleen Mishra	Shebin Backer Productions, Kunchacko Boban Productions, Moving Narratives	
D E C E M B E R	16	Choran	Santo Anthikkad	Praveen Rana, Sanjjanaa Galrani, Remya Panicker, Vineeth Thattil	Rana's Film Factory	
D E C E M B E R	16	Sanghaporul	Amal Rubinson	Irena Mihalkovich, Hameed Khan, Susmith Anand, Mridula Menon	Ruby	
D E C E M B E R	16	Vamanan	A. B. Binil	Indrans, Baiju Santhosh, Seema G. Nair, Dilshana Dilshad	Movie Gaang	
D E C E M B E R	22	Kaapa	Shaji Kailas	Prithviraj Sukumaran, Asif Ali, Aparna Balamurali, Anna Ben	FEFKA Writers Union, Theatre of Dreams, Saregama India Ltd.	
D E C E M B E R	23	Aanandam Paramanandam	Shafi	Sharaf U Dheen, Indrans, Anagha Narayanan, Aju Varghese	Sapthatharang	
D E C E M B E R	23	Better Half	Sooraj Tom	Jomon K John, Megha Thomas, Rony David	India Evangelical Team	
D E C E M B E R	23	Nalam Mura	Deepu Anthikkad	Biju Menon, Guru Somasundaram, Divya Pillai	Celebrands, Lakshmikanth Creations	
D E C E M B E R	23	Oh Meri Laila	Abhishek K. S.	Antony Varghese, Sona Olickal, Anuraj OB, Nandana Rajan	Dr. Paul's Entertainment	
D E C E M B E R	25	Route Map	Sooraj Sukumar Nair	Shaju Sreedhar, Sinseer, Anand Manmadhan, Sruthi Roshan, Maqbool Salmaan, Sunil Sukhada, Noby Marcose	Padmasree Media & Infotainments	
D E C E M B E R	30	Avalkkoppam	A. U. Sreejith Krishna	Brunda Krishna, Aristo Suresh	Kripanidhi Cinemas	
D E C E M B E R	30	B for Apple A for Darwin	Shafi S. S. Hussain	Rajith Kumar, Ravi Padena, Amrutha Mohan	Shehana Movies	
D E C E M B E R	30	Kakkipada	Shebi Chawghath	Appani Sarath, Niranj Maniyanpilla Raju, Manikandan R. Achari,	SV Productions	
D E C E M B E R	30	Malikappuram	Vishnu Sasi Shankar	Unni Mukundan, Saiju Kurup, Devanandha, Sreepath, Indrans, Manoj K Jayan	Unni Mukundan Pictures	
D E C E M B E R	30	Nalla Samayam	Omar Lulu	Irshad, Vijeesh, Gayathri, Nandana, Neena, Norah, Suvaibathul Aslamiya	Kalandoor Entertainments	
D E C E M B E R	30	Sanjay on Call	Jayan Naduvathazhath	Besu M George, Jewel Baby, Nisha, Sree Thampi, Swaminathan S	Orchid Films International, Benz Vasu Productions	
