= Kalavaramaye Madilo =

- Directed by: Satish Kasetty
- Written by: Satish Kasetty
- Produced by: Mohan Vadlapatla
- Starring: Swati Reddy; Kamal Kamaraju; Vikram Gokhale
- Cinematography: Rajendra Kesani
- Edited by: Basva Paidireddy
- Music by: Sharath
- Distributed by: Mohan Media Creations
- Release date: 17 July 2009
- Running time: 142 minutes
- Country: India
- Language: Telugu

Kalavaramaye Madilo is a 2009 Indian Telugu language musical romance film written and directed by Sathish Kasetty, who had earlier directed a Telugu film Hope which won a National Award. The film stars Swati Reddy and Kamal Kamaraju in the lead roles. The music was composed by Malayalam cinema musician Sharath. The film won two Nandi Awards.

== Plot ==
The film revolves around a girl (Swati Reddy) who is very ambitious and wants to sing under the music direction of A. R. Rahman. Her mother (Delhi Rajeswari) is not a fan of music, while Swati is. So she secretly works at a restaurant as a live singer and (Kamal Kamaraju) is a regular customer there. One day she receives negative criticism from a depressed classical musician (Vikram Gokhale). It is revealed that he was once a celebrated musician but remained poor due to lack of tactics in staying famous. He has a friend and assistant (Tanikella Bharani) who tries to keep him happy and healthy through his otherwise illness and poverty. In a turn of events, Swati happens to come to Vikram Gokhale to learn classical music. Though he refuses in the beginning to teach her, her determination and Tanikella Bharani's persistence make him agree. A quick learner, she happens to soon work on her skills and gain the affection of her teacher. All along, she has kept this a secret from her mother. On one day, an old photograph reveals to Swati and the audience that Vikram Gokhale and Delhi Rajeswari was a couple and Swati is their daughter. It is then revealed by Tanikella Bharani that Rajeswari moved far from her husband as he has nothing but love for music and the love alone can not take care of the financial needs of the family. The rest of the movie is all about Swati determining to bring her parents together, while cozying up to Kamal Kamaraju, now a close friend to her. She participates in a music competition along with other singers like (Sri Krishna). Before she sings on the dais, she pleads emotionally. Though she sings flawlessly, she is disqualified under the norms that prevent participants from emotionally manipulating the audience. However, music director (Koti) who is the chief guest to that competition makes an announcement that he has just received a call from A.R. Rahman and that he wants to make Swati sing in his next film, making her dreams true. Swati's parents unite to give a happy ending to the story.

== Cast ==
- Swati Reddy as Sreya
- Kamal Kamaraju as Seenu
- Vikram Gokhale as Rao
- Pragathi
- Tanikella Bharani
- Sudeepa Pinky
- Komali Sisters
- Koti (special appearance)

== Soundtrack ==
Sharath has composed the original score and soundtracks for the movie. K. S. Chitra, who won Nandi Award for Best Female Playback Singer for the song "Pallavinchane", performed the renditions for the movie. All the lyrics were penned by Vanamali. The tracks "Kalavaramaye Madilo", "Toli Toli Asalenno" & "Pallavinchani" received positive reviews and were hit tracks.

Kalavaramaye Madilo

Soundtrack album by Sharath
- Released: 2009
- Recorded: 2009
- Genre: Soundtrack
- Length: 28:16
- Label: Lahari Music
- Producer: Sharath

Sharath chronology
| Thirakkatha (2008) | Kalavaramaye Madilo (2009) | Chal Chala Chal (2009) |

Track-List
| No. | Title | Singer(s) | Length |
|---|---|---|---|
| 1. | "Kalavaramaye Madilo" | K. S. Chithra | 3:36 |
| 2. | "Toli Toli Asalenno" | K. S. Chithra | 3:23 |
| 3. | "Neelo Anuvantha" | K. S. Chithra, Roshan Sebastian | 4:06 |
| 4. | "Kari Varadhuni" | K. S. Chithra, Sharath | 2:00 |
| 5. | "Gurubrahma" | K. S. Chithra | 2:21 |
| 6. | "Oo Nuvve Oo Nenani" | Hariharan, Kalpana | 3:32 |
| 7. | "Sarigari Sarigari" | Sharath | 1:14 |
| 8. | "Guitar Theme" (Instrumental) | | 2:32 |
| 9. | "Pallavinchani" | K. S. Chithra | 5:32 |
| Total length: | | | 28:16 |

== Awards ==
Nandi Awards - 2009

- Third Best Feature Film - Bronze - Mohan Vadlapatla
- Best Female Playback Singer - K. S. Chithra - "Pallavinchani"
