= Sreemad Bhagavad Geetha =

- Directed by: P. Bhaskaran
- Screenplay by: Nagavally R. S. Kurup
- Produced by: P. Bhaskaran
- Starring: Srividya; Kaviyoor Ponnamma; KPAC Lalitha; Thikkurissy Sukumaran Nair
- Cinematography: U. Rajagopal
- Edited by: K. Sankunni
- Music by: V. Dakshinamoorthy
- Production company: Geethanjali
- Distributed by: Geethanjali
- Release date: 14 January 1977
- Country: India
- Language: Malayalam

Sreemad Bhagavad Geetha is a 1977 Indian Malayalam-language film, directed and produced by P. Bhaskaran. The film stars The film has musical score by V. Dakshinamoorthy.Sreemad Bhagavad Geetha

== Cast ==
- Srividya as Panchali
- Kaviyoor Ponnamma as Kunti
- KPAC Lalitha as Virupakshi
- Thikkurissy Sukumaran Nair as Dhritarashtrar
- Jose Prakash as Dharmaputhrar
- Manavalan Joseph as Mahodaran
- Mohan Sharma as Arjunan
- O. Ramdas as Dronar
- Sankaradi as Bhishmar
- Sreemoolanagaram Vijayan as Durvasavu
- T. R. Omana as Gandhari
- T. S. Muthaiah as Shakuni
- Prathapachandran as Shalyar
- G. K. Pillai as Duryodhanan
- Mallika Sukumaran as Bhanumati
- Murali Mohan as Nakulan
- N. Govindankutty as Kichakan
- P. K. Abraham as Dushasanan
- T. P. Madhavan as Naradan
- Vallathol Unnikrishnan as Vikadan
- Vidhubala as Chitrangada
- Ravikumar as Srikrishnan

== Soundtrack ==
The music was composed by V. Dakshinamoorthy and the lyrics were written by P. Bhaskaran.

No.	Song	Singers	Lyrics	Length (m:ss)
1	"Ellaam Neeye Shoure"	Sreemad Bhagavad Geetha	P. Bhaskaran	
2	"Indraprasthathinnadhinaayakane"	P. Leela, Chorus	P. Bhaskaran	
3	"Karunaasaagara"	Sreemad Bhagavad Geetha	P. Bhaskaran	
4	"Madhurabhaashinikal"	K. J. Yesudas	P. Bhaskaran	
5	"Oordhwamoolamadhashaakham" (Geethopadesam)	Sreemad Bhagavad Geetha		
6	"Paraa Paraa Paraa"	K. J. Yesudas	P. Bhaskaran	
7	"Vilaasalolupayaayi"	P. Susheela, P. Jayachandran	P. Bhaskaran	
8	"Yamunaatheerathil"	Ambili, Jayashree	P. Bhaskaran	
