= Sabaash Chandrabose =

2024 Indian Malayalam-language film

- Theatrical release poster of Sabaash Chandrabose
- Directed by: V. C. Abhilash
- Written by: V. C. Abhilash
- Produced by: Jolly Lonappan
- Starring: Vishnu Unnikrishnan; Dharmajan Bolgatty; Johny Antony; Jaffar Idukki; Sudhi Koppa; Irshad; Sneha Paliyeri; Remya Suresh
- Cinematography: Sajith Purushan
- Edited by: Stephan Mathew
- Music by: Sreenath Sivasankaran
- Production company: Jollywood Movies
- Distributed by: Capital Studios
- Release date: 5 August 2022
- Running time: 123 minutes
- Country: India
- Language: Malayalam

Sabaash Chandrabose is a 2022 Indian Malayalam-language period satirical comedy film written and directed by V. C. Abhilash. The film features Vishnu Unnikrishnan and Johny Antony in the lead roles, with Dharmajan Bolgatty and Jaffar Idukki in supporting roles.

== Plot ==
The plot is set in a rural village in Southern Kerala in 1986. The protagonist, Subhash Chandrabose (Chandran) was named after Netaji Subhas Chandra Bose by his father, an illiterate local activist under the mistaken belief that Nethaji was a prominent Communist leader. After his father passed away, Chandran lived with his mother, two sisters and nephew and is in relationship with Rani. His closest confidant was Yatheendran Nair, a relative of Rani.

The conflict begins when Chandran's family visits Yatheendran's house to watch television on a Sunday. During the visit, Yatheendran's bedridden father-in-law dies. During the funeral arrangements, Chandran's nephew accidentally turns on the TV, which angers Prameela, Yatheendran's wife. She scolds the nephew harshly and an offended Chandran argues with Yatheendran. Chandran challenges Yatheendran that he will buy a color TV larger than the black and white one in the house. Being a low-wage worker, Chandran couldn't afford a color TV at that time and he tries to raise money by asking Chettiyar, his employer and owner of a factory. But the factory soon shut down because of a labor strike. Assuming that the labor strike will last for years, Chandran decided to steal the television from the owner's locked office. However he steals the TV successfully with the help of his uncle Sunichan also a thief, and brings home in a new box, becoming popular as the first person in that village to own a color TV. A week later during the temple festival, Chandran learns that the labor strike has been settled and the factory will reopen on Monday. Chandran got panicked realizing that his theft will be exposed at once. As Sunichan got into police custody for another crime, Chandran reconciles with his friend Yatheendran by revealing the truth. Together they try to return the TV to the factory office. After a series of hurdles and efforts, they successfully place the TV back in office. Back in home, Chandran and Yatheendran catch a thief - an acquaintance of Sunichan trying to steal the same TV. As the thief flees away, Chandran screams that his TV has been stolen.

== Cast ==
- Vishnu Unnikrishnan as Subhash Chandrabose
- Johny Antony as Yatheendran Nair
- Dharmajan Bolgatty as Kallan
- Jaffar Idukki as Genjar/Chettiyar
- Sudhi Koppa as Sunichan
- Irshad as Kalappuraykkal Manoharan
- Sneha Paliyeri as Rani (Chandran's Lover)
- Remya Suresh as Prameela
- Bhanumathi as Amma
- Kottayam Ramesh as Mampadan
- V. C. Abhilash as Kuranchilakkod Bhasi
- Muralidas as Sanku Maman
- Sreeja Das as Latha
- Adhithi as Ambili
- Master Aman as Boy
- Krishnan Kutti as Ashly
- Balu as Balu
- Safvan as Kannan
- Muhammad Eravattoor as Babu
- Siva as Factory Worker
- Sreeju Mohan as Factory Worker
- Anu as Factory Worker

== Production ==
Following the success of his debut film Aalorukkam, V. C. Abhilash collaborated again with producer Jolly Lonappan under the same production banner for his second feature. While their previous collaboration was noted for its academic and social depth, Sabaash Chandrabose marked a departure for the duo, transitioning into a purely commercial and satirical genre.

== Release ==
Sabaash Chandrabose was released theatrically on August 5, 2022, distributed by Capital Cinemas. The film was released to Amazon Prime Video by October 27, 2022.

== Reception ==
The film earned both critical as well as commercial favor from scholars and general audiences alike. Critics specifically praised the authentic recreation of the 1980s aesthetic and the standout performances of Johny Antony and Vishnu Unnikrishnan. Furthermore, reviewers highlighted Abhilash's impressive versatility in transitioning from serious drama to this satirical period comedy.

Vinod Nair from Times of India gave 3 out of 5 noted that Sabaash Chandrabose "is a light-hearted movie which gives a nostalgic feel, and for the young it might provide a new feeling". Anusree Malapattam from Times of India Samayam rated 3.5 out of 5.

== Controversy ==
After the film's release, lead actor Vishnu Unnikrishnan claimed on Facebook that someone was trying to undermine the movie. He stated that although shows were scheduled to begin at 10 a.m., by 9 a.m. the film was already facing cyberattacks from certain English-language profiles.
