= George Kovoor =

Indian neurosurgeon (died 2019)

Dr. George Kovoor
- Died: 9 December 2019
- Occupations: Evangelist, Neurosurgeon
- Spouse: Swapna Kovoor
- Children: Abner Kovoor, Abigail and Abeline.

Ecclesiastical career
- Religion: Christian

George Kovoor was an Indian neurosurgeon, who gained popularity after being featured in many YouTube channels and Malayalam television shows as a Christian evangelist.

== Early life ==
He did his early education at St. Thomas Residential School, Thiruvananthapuram and went on to do his graduation and post graduation from Christian Medical College, Ludhiana.

He died from cancer on 9 December 2019. He left behind his spouse Swapna and his three children — Abner, Abigail and Abeline.

== Professional life ==
He served as neurosurgeon in Kovoor Institute of Neuro-Sciences, Thiruvalla and Trichur Heart Hospital.

== Controversy ==
Maradu apartments demolition order by the Supreme Court within a month after it was found that these were built violating the Coastal Regulation Zones (CRZ) rules made the residents of these apartments dismayed. George Kovoor, who owned an apartment in Jain Housing apartment complex in Kochi, revolted against the demolition order of the Court, that eventually fell on deaf ears.
