= Vidhi (2021 film) =

- Poster
- Directed by: Kannan Thamarakkulam
- Written by: Dinesh Pallath
- Produced by: Abraham Mathew; Sudarsanan
- Starring: Anoop Menon
- Cinematography: Ravichandran
- Edited by: V. T. Sreejith
- Music by: 4 Musics
- Release date: 30 December 2021
- Country: India
- Language: Malayalam

Vidhi (transl. Fate) is a 2021 Indian Malayalam-language film directed by Kannan Thamarakkulam, based on the Maradu apartments demolition order. The film stars Anoop Menon, Dharmajan Bolgatty, Manoj K. Jayan, Sheelu Abraham and Senthil Krishna. It was released on released on 30 December 2021.

== Cast ==
- Anoop Menon as Bharath
- Manoj K. Jayan
- Dharmajan Bolgatty as Maniyan
- Baiju Santhosh
- Senthil Krishna
- Kailash
- Hareesh Kanaran
- Abu Salim
- Kalabhavan Haneef
- Sheelu Abraham
- Noorin Shereef
- Sarayu Mohan
- Anjali Nair
- Jayakrishnan

== Production ==
The film is based on the Maradu apartments demolition order. It began production in late January 2020 under the title Maradu 357.

== Soundtrack ==
The music was composed by 4 Musics.

Track listing
No.	Title	Lyrics	Singer(s)	Length
1.	"Maanam Meethe"	Madhu Vasudevan	Anwar Sadath, Vipin Xavier, Biby Mathew, Haritha Balakrishnan	3:45
2.	"En Nenjinnullil"	Rajeev Alunkal	Hari Raveendran, Evelyn Vincent	3:27
3.	"Ho Jaane De"	Unni Mukundan	Jyotsna Radhakrishnan	2:49

== Release and reception ==
The film was initially scheduled to release on 19 February 2021, but eventually released on 30 December. The Times of India wrote, "It is interesting to see how a real-life story unfolds on screen, but doesn't really get you emotionally involved. You could give it a miss". OTTPlay wrote, "Too many subplots hinder the film from ever taking off". Mathrubhumi reviewed the film more positively, praising the filmmaking, screenplay and music. Asianet News appreciated the music, cinematography and editing, saying they compliment the screenplay.
