= Mareechika =

2026 Indian Telugu film by Satish Kasetty

- Theatrical release poster
- Directed by: Satish Kasetty
- Story by: Lakshmi Bhupala
- Produced by: Rajiv Chilaka; Meghhaa Chilakka
- Starring: Viraj Ashwin; Regena Cassandrra; Anupama Parameswaran
- Cinematography: Arvind Kannabiran
- Edited by: Junaid Siddiqui
- Music by: Ilaiyaraaja
- Production company: Chilaka Productions
- Release date: 29 May 2026
- Running time: 138 minutes
- Country: India
- Language: Telugu

Mareechika is a 2026 Indian Telugu-language mystery crime thriller film co-written and directed by Satish Kasetty. The film stars Viraj Ashwin, Regena Cassandrra and Anupama Parameswaran.

The film was released on 29 May 2026.

== Plot ==
Venkatalakshmi "Venky" rushes to the police station and tells SI Anjibabu that her friend Mareechika killed Sanjay "Sanju". Venky reveals a flashback: Venky was a shy, nerdy college student harboring a one-sided love towards Sanju, who was from a wealthy family and worked at a bakery where Venky regularly visited. Later, she met Mareechika, a beautiful and confident English-speaking girl, while helping her in a supermarket and they both become close friends with each other. Further it is revealed that Mareechika came from a wealthy family and lost her parents in a car crash, and owns multiple properties in various countries. However, she has been getting offers on selling the house she lives in which she declines. Later, when Venky and Mareechika visit Sanju's bakery. Sanju gets attracted to Mareechika and tries to woo her much to Venky's despair. On Valentine's day, Venky sees Sanju confessing to Mareechika to which she agreed. Later, Sanju and Mareechika get into a relationship. Soon, Mareechika proposes marriage to Sanju to which he agrees. However, the day after their wedding Venky finds Mareechika's apartment empty, and also finds out that she lied about her ownership on the house. Suspicious, she investigates the room and comes into a conclusion that Mareechika married Sanjay for monetary benefits and she had planned to extort money from him. Soon, she calls Sanju to warn him. Abruptly, Mareechika decides to take them both on a honeymoon to Singapore. While on the way, Sanju and Mareechika are stopped by Sanju's friends, thereupon revealing Mareechika's plan and that even they are a part of it. A scuffle ensues where Mareechika kills Sanju and flees. Venky has witnessed this.

As Anjibabu attempts to inquire about Sanju, Sanju arrives at the police station alive, much to everyone's shock. Sanju also reveals he doesn't know anyone named Mareechika and that during Valentine's day Venky had confessed to him but he turned her down as he didn't reciprocate. Soon after, Venky becomes erratic and is taken to a psychiatrist who reveals that due to Sanju's rejection, Venky spiraled into depression which lead to schizophrenia, Mareechika is a hallucination created by Venky, who was insecure about herself. Sanju feels guilty, and agrees to marry Venky to take care of her. Later, it is revealed that the whole flashback was fabricated, in fact Mareechika existed and Sanju wanted to buy her assets for which he got close with her. Morever, it wasn't Mareechika but Sanju who proposed marriage and planned the honeymoon to extort money from her. Venky called Mareechika to warn her about Sanju. Sanju actually planned this with his friends, who tried to Mareechika, which lead to a scuffle where Sanju killed Mareechika. After witnessing this, Venky blackmailed Sanju into marrying her, for which she and Sanju pretended she was mentally ill and hired a psychiatrist to lie.

6 months later, however, both Sanju and Venky soon start to see visions of Mareechika haunting them, much to their horror. They encounter Mareechika at Sanju's guesthouse, where she kills Sanju. Venky flees in horror and goes to the police station, where she mentions Mareechika again. This time, Mareechika follows her into the police station, where she is revealed to in fact be alive and admits that she doesn't know who Sanju is. Moreover, when they visit Sanju's guesthouse, it is found empty. Puzzled, Anjibabu, Venky and Mareechika investigate and find out that Sanju died two years ago from suicide. A puzzled Anjibabu assumes that the one who came to the police station five months prior might actually be "Sanju's ghost" or Venky's "mental illness" relapsing again. Venky once again grows erratic and accuses Mareechika of being a "ghost" until the police restrain her and take her away. Mareechika leaves to London.

However, Anjibabu soon pieces the puzzle together: Mareechika had exacted her revenge upon Venky and Sanju for cheating and trying to kill her, which is why she "haunted" them. After Venky and Sanju left Mareechika, she was saved by a bystander, thus surviving her attempted murder. Mareechika had paid someone to fabricate the lie that Sanju committed suicide and showed up at their places to scare them. The movie ends with Anjibabu deciding to keep this case aside and focus on newer cases.

== Cast ==
- Regena Cassandrra as Mareechika
- Anupama Parameswaran as Venkata Lakshmi
- Viraj Ashwin as Sanjay "Sanju"
- Ajay Ghosh as SI Anji Babu, the Investigation officer
- Thagubothu Ramesh
- Bhadram

== Music ==
The soundtrack and background score were composed by Ilaiyaraaja.

All lyrics are written by Lakshmi Bhupala.

Track listing
No.	Title	Singer(s)	Length
1.	"Vennela Thunaka"	Reema	4:55
2.	"Andhee Andhani Andham"	Karthik, Shweta Mohan	4:16

== Release and reception ==
Mareechika was released in theatres on 29 May 2026.

Suresh Kavirayani of Cinema Express rated the film 2.5 out 5 and noted the performances of the lead cast while opining that the film "had the potential to become a gripping mystery crime thriller if the screenplay had been tighter and more engaging". A critic of Eenadu was critical towards the repetitive narration and lack of freshness in the story.
