= Star (2021 film) =

- Theatrical release poster
- Directed by: Domin D'Silva
- Written by: Suvin S. Somasekharan
- Produced by: Abraham Mathew
- Starring: Joju George; Sheelu Abraham; Jaffar Idukki
- Cinematography: Tharun Bhaskaran
- Edited by: Lalkrishnan S. Achutham
- Music by: M Jayachandran; Ranjin Raj
- Production company: Abaam Movies
- Release date: 29 October 2021 (India)
- Country: India
- Language: Malayalam

Star is a 2021 Indian Malayalam-language film directed by Domin D'Silva, written by Suvin S. Somasekharan and produced by Abraham Mathew under the banner of Abaam Movies. The film stars Joju George, Sheelu Abraham, Jaffar Idukki and Prithviraj Sukumaran in a cameo appearance.

The film was released worldwide on 29 October 2021 to mostly negative reviews.

== Plot ==
The film is about a couple, Roy and Ardra, married for 17 years and living happily with their four children. Their life turns upside down once Ardra starts behaving very strangely all of a sudden.

== Cast ==
- Joju George as Roy
- Sheelu Abraham as Ardra
- Prithviraj Sukumaran as Dr. Derrick (cameo appearance)
- Jaffar Idukki
- Subbalakshmi
- Baby Sreelakshmi
- Gayathri Ashok
- Rajesh B.
- Tanmay Mithun Madhavan
- Saniya Babu
- Sarasa Balusherry
- Shiny Sarah
- Sabhita Calicut
- Karam Hamadneh

== Music ==
The music of the film is composed by M. Jayachandran and Ranjin Raj.

Star

Soundtrack album by M. Jayachandran Ranjin Raj
- Released: 2021
- Recorded: 2021
- Genre: Feature film soundtrack
- Length: 4:38
- Label: Saina
- Producer: Abraham Mathew

Singles from Star
- 1. "Kuruvaa Kaavile" Released: 16 April 2021; 2. "Aayiram Thara Deepangal" Released: 17 July 2021; 3. "Ninnodu Cheran" Released: 15 October 2021; 4. "Poothalam Pularithalam" Released: 4 November 2021

Tracklist
No.	Title	Lyrics	Singer(s)	Length
1.	"Kuruvaa Kaavile"	B.K. Harinarayanan	Sithara Krishnakumar	3:50
2.	"AayiramThara Deepangal"	B.K. Harinarayanan	Mridula Warrier	4:41
3.	"Ninnodu Cheran"	B.K. Harinarayanan	Nithya Mammen	4:32
4.	"Poothalam Pularithalam"	B.K. Harinarayanan	Vijay Yesudas	3:08
Total length:				15:31

== Release ==
The film was originally planned to release on 9 April 2021, but was postponed due to second wave of COVID-19 pandemic in India. The film was released theatrically on 29 October 2021.

== Reception ==
Deepa Soman critic of The Times of India gave 2.5 out of 5 and stated that "Then again, Star's team deserves praise for at least thinking about making a movie on the subject.". A critic from Onmanorama wrote that "The acting prowess of Joju is the takeaway from Star, directed by Domin D’Silva"
