= Terror (2016 film) =

Indian action thriller film by Satish Kasetty

- Directed by: Satish Kasetty
- Written by: Satish Kasetty
- Produced by: Shaikk Mastan
- Starring: Srikanth
- Cinematography: Vasili Shyamprasad
- Edited by: Basva Paidireddy
- Music by: Sai Karthik
- Release date: 26 February 2016
- Running time: 144 minutes
- Country: India
- Language: Telugu

Terror (Oka Polisodi Katha) is a 2016 Indian Telugu-language action thriller film written and directed by Satish Kasetty. Produced by Shaikk Mastan, the film features Srikanth in the lead role with Nikita, Nassar, Ravi Varma, Kota Srinivasa Rao and Prudhviraj in supporting roles. The film revolves around honest police officer Vijay who finds out about an imminent terror attack on the city, and has to act before time runs out, despite the involvement of politicians and some of those from his own department.

Terror was released worldwide on 26 February 2016. Following the positive reception, the film gained more screens and eventually turned out to be a box office hit.

== Plot ==
Vijay is an honest police officer who tries to serve with full integrity, but sometimes has to give in to pressure from his superiors and the government. One day, he leads his team to raid a club belonging to MLA Ravi. During the raid, he fatally shoots wanted criminal Johnny, who works for Ravi, and seizes a large amount of Ravi’s money. When he submits the seized money to his superior Rathod, who is also his longtime friend, Rathod tells him that Ravi is very upset about the operation and that to keep his job, Vijay must return the money to Ravi. Vijay, knowing he has no leverage against Ravi, reluctantly agrees.

The Home Minister receives an intelligence report stating that terrorist Arrif has planned an attack at a rally that he and the Chief Minister would attend. To serve his own interests, the Home Minister dismisses the report and changes his own schedule so that the CM, along with the civilians present, would be killed at the rally, allowing him to assume the CM’s position.

After returning the money to Ravi, Ravi demands more money as a bribe to spare Vijay. Vijay has no option but to agree and struggles to arrange the money. One day, while on patrol, Vijay spots Karim, a former prisoner who had connections with terrorists, meeting a plastic merchant who has a criminal history of providing explosives to criminals. Out of suspicion, Vijay questions the two separately and receives conflicting answers, making him believe they are planning an attack. Arrif also learns that Karim has attracted police attention, so he orders his men to kill Karim. Karim survives the attack and goes underground.

A few days later, Vijay receives a suitcase full of money and a note telling him to take the money and stop the investigation, or else his whole family will be killed. Realizing the seriousness of the situation, Vijay takes the suitcase and the note to Rathod and asks for suggestions. Rathod suggests that Vijay use the money to pay the bribe he owes to Ravi and drop the investigation. However, Rathod accidentally mentions the exact amount of money in the suitcase, which Vijay had not told him. Vijay then accuses Rathod of being involved and confronts him. Mujeeb, a new police officer in Vijay and Rathod’s department, overhears the conversation at Rathod’s house. Rathod knocks Vijay and Mujeeb unconscious and locks them up.

Rathod asks the Home Minister for instructions about what to do with Vijay, and the Home Minister orders him to kill Vijay. Rathod returns to Vijay but is unable to kill him due to their longtime friendship. Rathod begs Vijay for his cooperation, but Vijay refuses. Vijay fights Rathod and escapes with Mujeeb. He is then declared a rogue police officer by his department. Vijay goes underground to investigate the terrorist attack plot. However, his colleagues in the department, who know him well, secretly support him. The Home Minister then gives Rathod a shoot-on-sight order for Vijay.

During their investigation, Vijay and Muzib discover the Home Minister's involvement. They later find Karim, who reveals the terrorists’ attack plan to them. With this information, they first arrest Arrif, who refuses to reveal detailed information about the attack. They then arrest another terrorist who is also involved and already on the police watchlist. With the information obtained from him, they can uncover the full details of the attack plan.

At the rally where Arrif planned the attack, Vijay instructs the police to defuse all the bombs planted by Arrif’s men. Rathod is also present at the scene to kill Vijay, but a terrorist who is about to be captured by Vijay takes Rathod hostage. Vijay kills the terrorist and saves Rathod. Rathod then tries to commit suicide out of guilt, but fails because Vijay has removed the bullets from his gun.

The Home Minister is furious after learning that Vijay has foiled his plan. He summons Vijay to his house and threatens him in private. However, Vijay ties a bomb around his own neck to intimidate him, causing the Home Minister to die of a heart attack. Vijay then walks free as a hero who stopped the attack, as nobody knows the real reason for the Home Minister’s death.

== Cast ==
- Srikanth as Vijay
- Nikita as Pooja, Vijay's wife
- Kota Srinivasa Rao as Home Minister K. Sudarshan Rao
- Vinay Varma as DCP V. Rathod
- Prudhviraj as MLA Ravi
- Ravi Varma as Mujeeb
- Nassar as Sudhakar, Vijay's father
- Sudha as Vijay's mother
- Uttej as Shiva
- Mujtaba Ali Khan as Aarif
- Priyadarshi Pullikonda as Terrorist
- Rama Rao Jadhav as Tenthouse Owner
- Seshagiri Rao T as Businessman
- Nalamada Uttam Kumar Reddy as Chief Minister (cameo)
- Rajesh Touchriver as Terrorist

== Soundtrack ==
Songs composed by Sai Karthik.

Terror

Soundtrack album by Sai Karthik
- Released: 2016
- Genre: Feature film soundtrack
- Producer: Sai Karthik

Sai Karthik chronology
| Jatha Kalise (2015) | Terror (2016) | Tuntari (2016) |

- "O Lala O Lala"
- "Dil Ka Diwana"
- "Okkasari"

== Release and reception ==
Srivathsan Nadadhur of The Hindu rated the film three-and-a-half out of five stars and wrote, "Terror is a rare razor-sharp cop film that stays loyal to the storytelling patterns it adopts, right from the start. Taking the least of cinematic liberties and avoiding commercial compromises, it is a nail-biting film that hardly strikes a false note." Ch Sushil Rao of The Times of India gave it two out of five stars and wrote that "The film is a bit lengthy with no comedy to tickle your funny bone." Jeevi of Idlebrain gave it three out of five stars and wrote that "Terror breaks a lot of stereotypes in Telugu and stands out as a film that sticks to it's [sic] genre. There are neither songs nor comedy scenes. It doesn't bore you despite having a serious story."
