= Satish Kasetty =

Indian film director

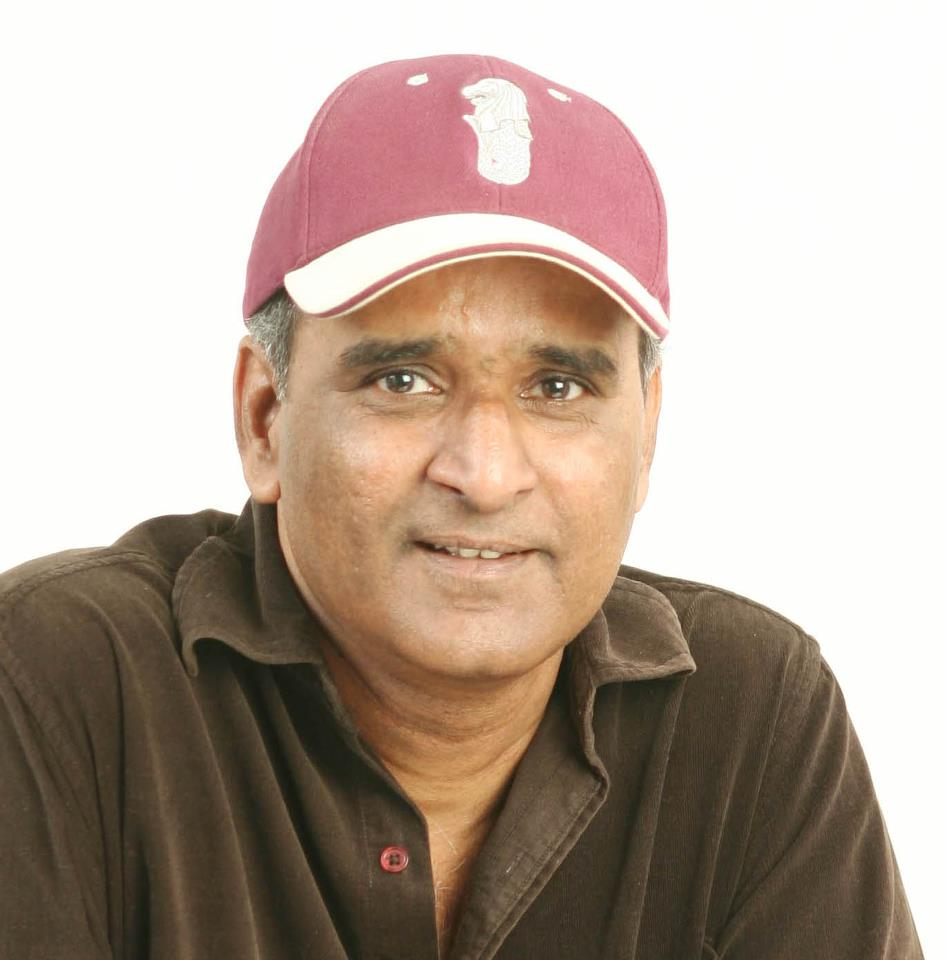
- Born: Kasetty Sathyanarayana
- Occupation: Film director
- Website: http://satishkasetty.com/

Satish Kasetty (born as Kasetty Sathyanarayana and sometimes credited as K. Sathyanarayana) is an Indian film director who predominantly works in the Telugu film industry.

== Career ==
Kasetty is known for his debut directorial 2006 Telugu film Hope for which he won the National Film Award for Best Film on Other Social Issues at the 54th National Film Awards. The film dealt with the topic of teenage suicides due to peer pressure and stress caused by the education system. He shared the award with the producer of the film Policherla Venkata Subbiah. The jury presented the award to the film for "focusing on the need to re-examine the present-day education system that leads many young people to commit suicide".

In 2009, Kasetty released his musical romantic film Kalavaramaye Madilo, . It won the prestigious "Nandi" award, as the third best film. The Nightingale of the south india Chitra won the best singer award for the song "pallavinchani". The story of this film revolved around the lead character, played by actress Swati Reddy, aspiring to sing for A. R. Rahman. Rediff.com in their review of the film called it "appealing" and gave three out of five stars. Most recently Satish came up with his third film, Terror, a thriller featuring Srikanth in the lead. The film went on to be released in February 2016 and received critical acclaim.

Before turning a film director, Kasetty has also been a fashion photographer, event manager, choreographer and ad film maker. He was also the jury on the 59th National Film Awards.

== Filmography ==
Year	Title	Notes
2006	Hope	
2009	Kalavaramaye Madilo	
2016	Terror	
2026	Mareechika	Only director
