= National Film Award for Best Film on Other Social Issues =

Indian film award

- National award for contributions to Indian Cinema
- Awarded for: Best feature film on Social Issues such as Prohibition, Women and Child Welfare, Anti-dowry, Drug Abuse, Welfare of the Handicapped etc. for a year
- Sponsored by: Directorate of Film Festivals
- Rewards: Rajat Kamal (Silver Lotus); ₹150,000 (US$1,600)
- First award: 1984
- Final award: 2021
- Most recent Winner: Anunaad – The Resonance

Highlights
- Total awarded: 42
- First winner: Accident

The National Film Award for Best Film on Other Social Issues was one of the categories in the National Film Awards presented annually by the Directorate of Film Festivals, the organization set up by the Ministry of Information and Broadcasting in India. It was one of several awards presented for feature films and is awarded with Rajat Kamal (Silver Lotus). At the 70th National Film Awards, the category was discontinued and combined with Best Film on Family Welfare, Best Film on National Integration and Best Feature Film on National Integration. The new award is named as Best Feature Film Promoting National, Social and Environmental Values.

The National Film Awards were established in 1954 to "encourage production of the films of a high aesthetic and technical standard and educational and culture value" and also planned to included awards for regional films. In 1984, at the 32nd National Film Awards various new categories were instituted for Swarna Kamal and Rajat Kamal. Categories like the Best Supporting Actor, Best Supporting Actress, Best Costume Design along with the Best Film on Other Social Issues were introduced for the Rajat Kamal. This category was introduced to be awarded annually for films produced in the year across the country, in all Indian languages. As of 2016 since its inception, the award has been present thirty-three times to thirty-six films. It has been presented for films in seven languages with the highest being twelve in Hindi, followed by ten in Malayalam, five in Tamil, four in Marathi, three in Bengali, two in Kannada and one in Telugu. It was not presented on two occasion in 1985 (33rd ceremony) and 2011 (59th ceremony).

The inaugural award was conferred upon production banner Sanket (Rajat Kamal and ₹ 30,000) and director Shankar Nag (Rajat Kamal and ₹ 15,000) for their Kannada film Accident for dealing with the bold topic of whistleblowing against political corruption and dealing with bad effects of alcoholism. On five occasion the award was shared by two films: in 1987 by Tamil films Ore Oru Gramathiley and Vedham Pudhithu, in 1993 by Janani (Bengali) and Naaraayam (Malayalam), in 1994 by Wheelchair (Bengali) and Parinayam (Malayalam), in 2000 by Munnudi (Kannada) and Vetri Kodi Kattu (Tamil), and in 2003 by Hindi films Koi... Mil Gaya and Gangaajal.

== Winners ==
The award includes 'Rajat Kamal' (Silver Lotus) and cash prize to the producers and director each. The first award in 1984 had a monetary association of ₹ 30,000 to the producers and ₹ 15,000 to the directors. In 1995 at the 43rd award ceremony the Marathi film Doghi was honoured and the cash prices were revised to ₹30,000 each presented to the director duo Sumitra Bhave–Sunil Sukthankar and co-producers National Film Development Corporation of India (NFDC) and Doordarshan. The monetary association was again revised to ₹ 1,50,000 to both the producers and directors in 2006 at the 54th ceremony where producer Policherla Venkata Subbiah and director Satish Kasetty's Telugu film Hope was the winner.

†	Indicates a joint award for that year

Following are the award winners over the years:

List of films, showing the year (award ceremony), language(s), producer(s) and director(s)
Year	Film(s)	Language(s)	Producer(s)	Director(s)	Refs.
1984 (32nd)	Accident	Kannada	Sanket	Shankar Nag	
1985 (33rd)	No Award				
1986 (34th)	Doore Doore Oru Koodu Koottam	Malayalam	M. Mani	Sibi Malayil	
1987 (35th)	Ore Oru Gramathiley	Tamil	S. Rangarajan	Jyothipandian	
1987 (35th)	Vedham Pudhithu	Tamil	Janani Arts Creations	Bharathiraja	
1988 (36th)	Main Zinda Hoon	Hindi	• NFDC • Doordarshan	Sudhir Mishra	
1989 (37th)	Unnikuttanu Joli Kitty	Malayalam	V. R. Gopinath	V. R. Gopinath	
1990 (38th)	Oru Veedu Iru Vasal	Tamil	Kavithalayaa Productions	K. Balachander	
1991 (39th)	Yamanam	Malayalam	Ajayan Varicolil	Bharath Gopi	
1992 (40th)	Neenga Nalla Irukkanum	Tamil	GV Films	Visu	
1993 (41st)	Janani	Bengali	Sanat Dasgupta	Sanat Dasgupta	
1993 (41st)	Naaraayam	Malayalam	Raju Pilakat	Sasi Shankar	
1994 (42nd)	Parinayam	Malayalam	G. P. Vijayakumar	Hariharan	
1994 (42nd)	Wheelchair	Bengali	NFDC	Tapan Sinha	
1995 (43rd)	Doghi	Marathi	• NFDC • Doordarshan	• Sumitra Bhave • Sunil Sukthankar	
1996 (44th)	Tamanna	Hindi	Pooja Bhatt	Mahesh Bhatt	
1997 (45th)	Dhanna	Hindi	Films Division	Deepak Roy	
1998 (46th)	Chinthavishtayaya Shyamala	Malayalam	C. Karunakaran	Sreenivasan	
1999 (47th)	Kairee	Hindi	Government of India	Amol Palekar	
2000 (48th)	Vetri Kodi Kattu	Tamil	D. Pandian	Cheran	
2000 (48th)	Munnudi	Kannada	Navachitra	P. Sheshadri	
2001 (49th)	Chandni Bar	Hindi	Lata Mohan Iyer	Madhur Bhandarkar	
2002 (50th)	Swaraaj	Hindi	George Mathew	Anwar Jamal	
2003 (51st)	Koi... Mil Gaya	Hindi	Rakesh Roshan	Rakesh Roshan	
2003 (51st)	Gangaajal	Hindi	Prakash Jha	Prakash Jha	
2004 (52nd)	Perumazhakkalam	Malayalam	Salim Padiyath	Kamal	
2005 (53rd)	Iqbal	Hindi	Subhash Ghai	Nagesh Kukunoor	
2006 (54th)	Hope	Telugu	Policherla Venkata Subbiah	Satish Kasetty	
2007 (55th)	Antardwand	Hindi	Sushil Rajpal	Sushil Rajpal	
2008 (56th)	Jogwa	Marathi	Shripal Morakhia	Rajeev Patil	
2009 (57th)	Well Done Abba	Hindi	Reliance Big Pictures	Shyam Benegal	
2010 (58th)	Champions	Marathi	Aishwarya Narkar	Ramesh More	
2011 (59th)	No Award				
2012 (60th)	Spirit	Malayalam	M. J. Antony	Renjith	
2013 (61st)	Tuhya Dharma Koncha	Marathi	Indian Magic Eye Motion Pictures Pvt Ltd.	Satish Manwar	
2014 (62nd)	Chotoder Chobi	Bengali	Shree Venkatesh Films	Kaushik Ganguly	
2015 (63rd)	Nirnayakam	Malayalam	Jairaj Films	V. K. Prakash	
2016 (64th)	Pink	Hindi	Rashmi Sharma Telefilms Limited	Aniruddha Roy Chowdhury	
2017 (65th)	Aalorukkam	Malayalam	Jolly Lonappan	V. C. Abhilash	
2018 (66th)	Pad Man	Hindi	• Twinkle Khanna • Hope Productions Pvt. Ltd	R. Balki	
2019 (67th)	Anandi Gopal	Marathi	Essel Vision Productions	Sameer Vidhwans	
2020 (68th)	Funral	Marathi	Before After Entertainment	Vivek Dubey	
2021 (69th)	Anunaad – The Resonance	Assamese	Assam State Film Corporation	Reema Borah	
