= Karie =

- Directed by: Naranipuzha Shanavas
- Written by: Naranipuzha Shanavas
- Produced by: Sudeep Palanad Rammohan Ravindran
- Starring: Gopu Keshav; Rammohan; K. T. Satheesan; Velayudhan; Parukutti; Unni Kumbidi
- Cinematography: Ramachandran
- Edited by: Naranipuzha Shanavas
- Music by: Sudeep Palanad
- Release date: 2015
- Country: India
- Language: Malayalam

Karie (English translation: charcoal) is a 2015 Indian Malayalam-language film. It is the debut feature film by Naranipuzha Shanavas.

Karie transcends and outstrips geography and time. It encapsulates the essence of travel from north to south of Kerala through the medium of a mythical dance form called Karinkaaliyaattam (Karie). Even though the south and north of Kerala differ in most aspects of life, the one unfortunate invariant across these subcultures is caste/class differences.

The Karinkaaliyaattam has a caste rejoinder for when the lower caste people puts on the costume of Karinkaali (The black Kaali) the upper castes have to pay obeisance to them. The artist, who wears the guise of Karinkaali the god, is a dual personality as he is of a lower caste and simultaneously a personification of God. In the movie, the sojourn circulates through the dark waters of escapades, presided over by the omnipotent black goddess. As the movie progresses, the boundary between god and human being becomes inseparable from each other. Karie was nominated for the National Award in 2015.

== Plot ==
Gopu Kesav Menon and Bilal travel from south to north and on the way they visit Dineshan's home who is an employee of Gopu. When they reach the home there is some preparations happening for an offering to a nearby temple in the form of a mythical dance form named Karinkaliyattam (Karie). They hand over some money to Dineshan's father. The paradox is this money is used to conduct the dance as an offering to goddess to get a permanent visa in Gopu's firm, which Gopu can easily give if he decides.

== Cast ==
- Gopu Keshav as Gopu Kesav Menon
- Rammohan as Bilal
- K. T. Satheesan as Karingali
- Pradeep as Shibutan
- Velayudhan as Dineshan's Father
- Parukutti Amma as Dineshan's Mother
- Unni Kumbidi as Police
- Leo as Police
