= Maradu apartments demolition order =

Violation of Coastal Regulation Zone

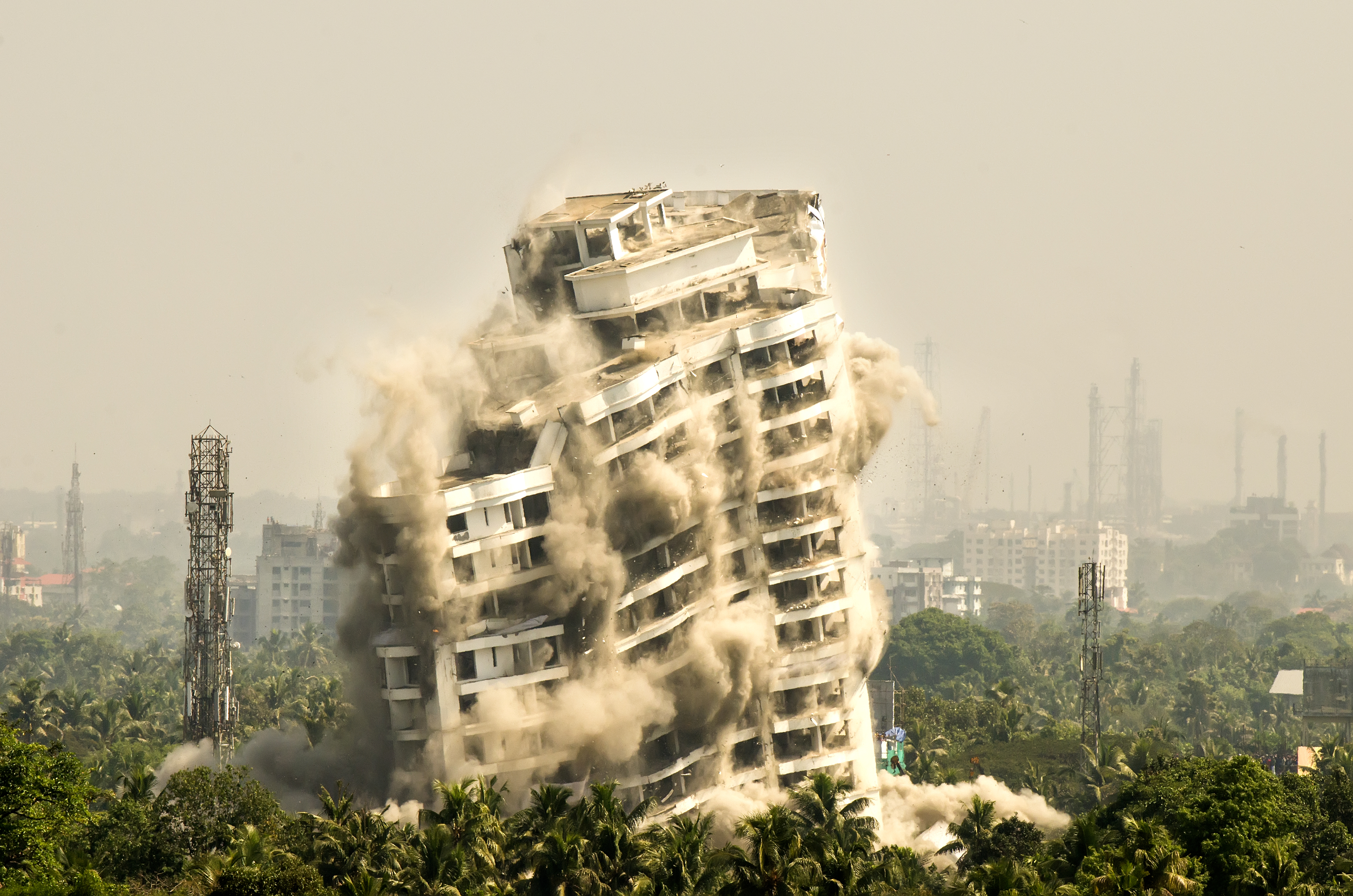
H2O Holy Faith - Maradu - Demolition

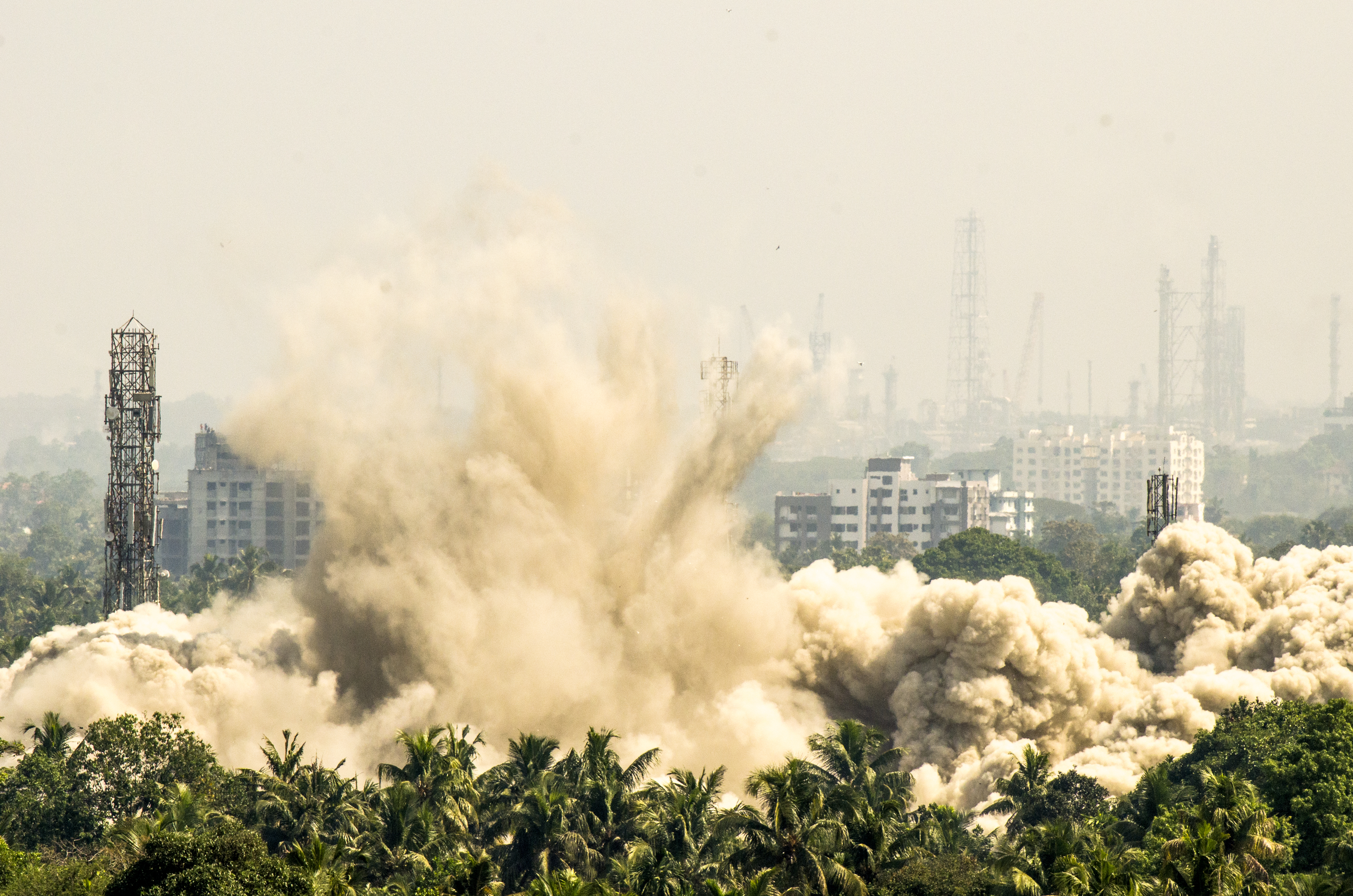
H2O Holy Faith - Maradu - Demolition 2

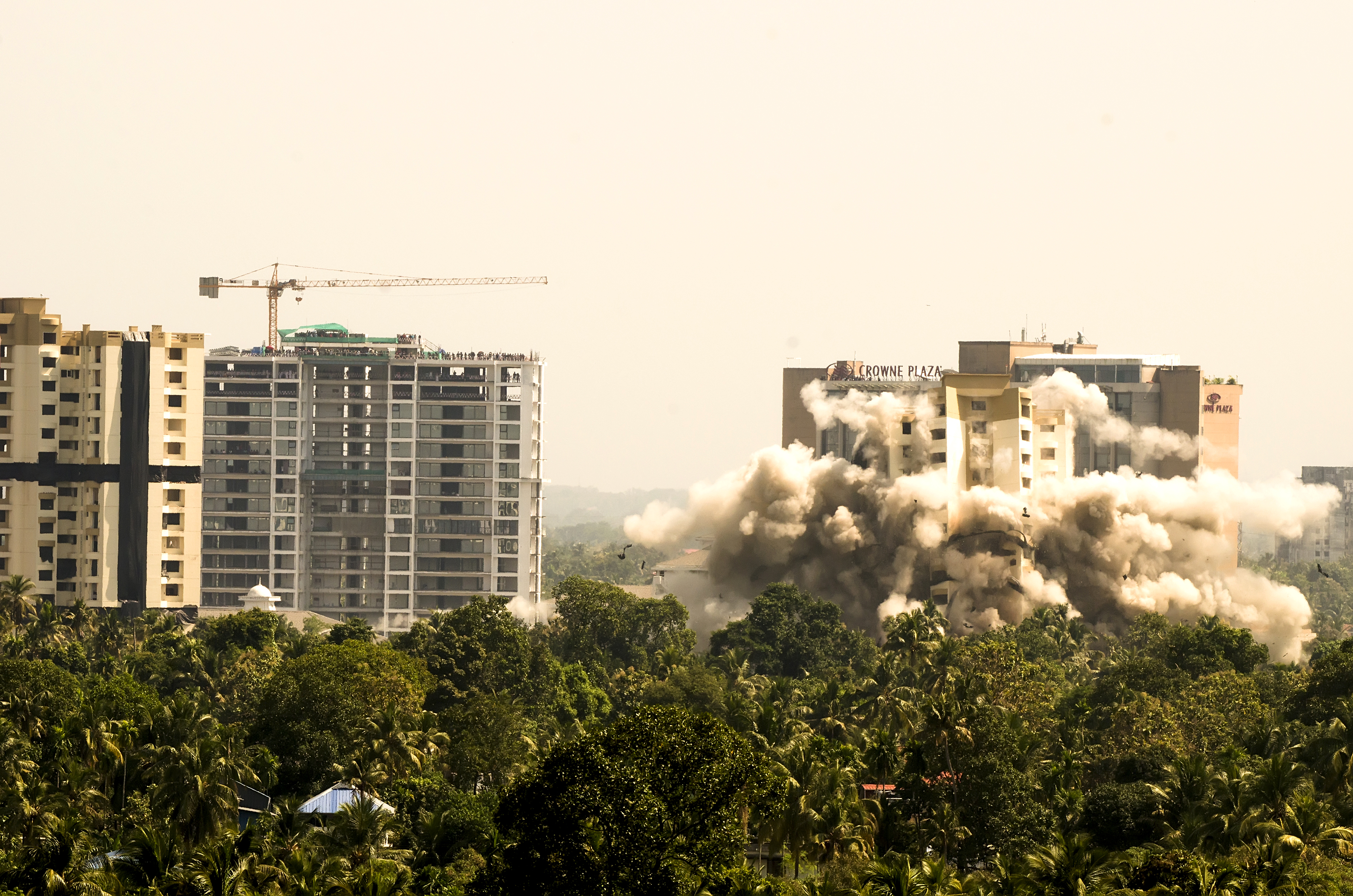
Alfa Serene Tower 1 - Maradu - Demolition

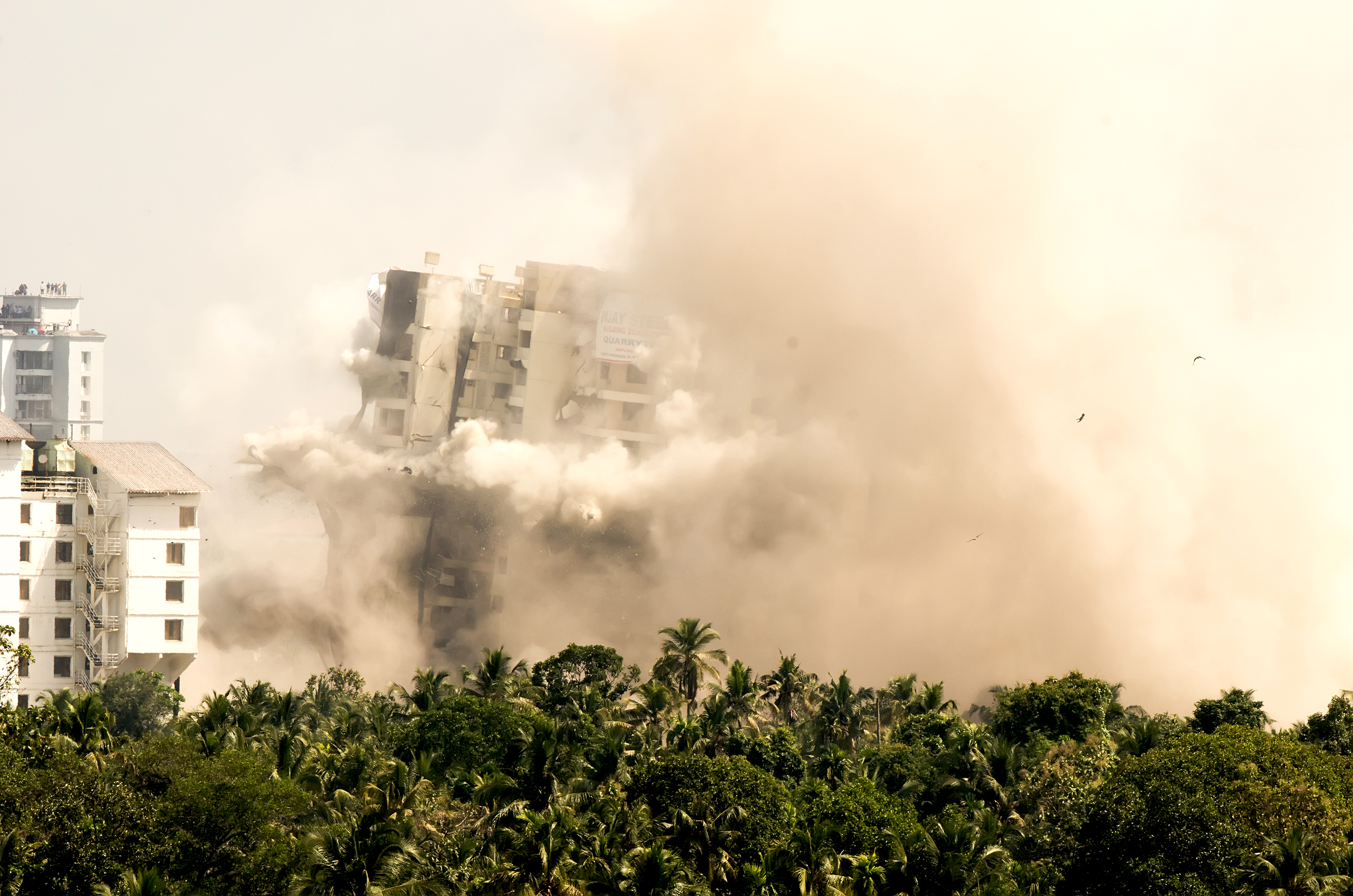
Alfa Serene Tower 2 - Maradu - Demolition

On 8 May 2019, the Supreme Court of India ordered five apartments in Maradu municipality in Kerala to be demolished within one month, for violation of Coastal Regulation Zone (CRZ) rules, although only four of these apartments had yet been constructed. These four, already occupied by tenants, were Jains Coral Cove (Jain Housing and Construction Ltd), H2O Holy Faith (Holy Faith Builders and Developers Pvt Ltd) and Alfa Serene (Alfa Ventures Private Ltd) and Golden Kayaloram (KP Varkey & VS Builders). The fifth builder, Holiday Heritage, had scrapped the project.

The order was passed by a bench consisting of justices Arun Mishra and Navin Sinha. The H2O Holy Faith and Alpha Serene buildings were demolished on 11 January 2020 and the Jains Coral Cove and Golden Kayaloram were demolished on 12 January 2020 through implosion.

== Background and timeline ==
- 1986 The Environment Protection Act of 1986 was enacted in the wake of the Bhopal Tragedy. It came into force on 19 November 1986. The purpose of the Act is to implement the decisions of the United Nations Conference on the Human Environment. They relate to the protection and improvement of the human environment and the prevention of hazards to human beings, other living creatures, plants and property. The Act is an "umbrella" legislation designed to provide a framework for central government coordination of the activities of various central and state authorities established under previous laws, such as the Water Act and the Air Act.
- 1991 In February 1991, a notification was issued by the Ministry of Environment and Forests (MoEF) under the Environment Protection Act, 1986. This was for the regulation of activities in the coastal area. As per the notification, four categories of Coastal Regulation Zones (CRZ) were defined. CRZ I, CRZ II, CRZ III and CRZ IV.
- 1995 No Objection Certificate (NOC) was issued to Golden Kayaloram by the Secretary of Maradu Grama Panchayat.
- 1996 In 1996, the Coastal Zone Management Plan was introduced.
- 2005 The Local Self Government Department (LSGD) conducted a vigilance probe. During this probe, files were confiscated from the office of the Maradu Panchayat secretary.
- 2005-2006 The permission to construct the buildings was granted by the Maradu Panchayat.
- 2007 The Kerala Government sent a letter to the Maradu panchayat along with a list of all the cases in which violations/anomalies in the issue of building permits were detected during the inspection of the Senior Town Planner (Vigilance). The panchayat was asked to revoke all the listed building permits as per Rule 16 of the Kerala Municipality Building Rules 1999 (KMBR). On receiving the letter, the panchayat issued show-cause notice to the builders in all the cases. Even though the violations varied from CRZ violation, FAR more than 1.25, violations of open space, copy of final plan not available in the file, access width not shown etc., the allegation was the same and the notice was identical. (Even though there was no CRZ violation in the case of Golden Kayaloram, for example, the same notice was issued.) Alpha Ventures filed a writ petition seeking to quash the notice and to answer their reply seeking details on the basis of which the notice was issued. The High Court of Kerala admitted the writ petition and issued an interim order staying all further proceedings with respect to the notice issued to the builders. But the High Court, in the interim order allowed the Maradu panchayat to issue stop memo in accordance with the law. The Maradu panchayat did not issue any stop memo. Hence, Alpha Ventures continued the construction of the building. In June 2007, as per the instruction of the Kerala government, the Maradu panchayat gave a show-cause notice to the concerned builders. Jain Housing, Holy Faith Builders, and KP Varkey also continued the construction activities. Holiday Heritage discontinued their housing project. In 2007 itself, in an affidavit, a panchayat member stated that Maradu is CRZ II.
- 2010 Maradu panchayat became a municipality in November 2010. The municipality approached the Division Bench of the High Court with an appeal, which was dismissed. In 2016, the division bench of the Kerala High Court ruled that Maradu municipality was solely responsible for the situation.
- 2011 CZMP prepared in accordance with the Coastal Regulation Zone Notification of 2011 marked Maradu in the CRZ-II category.
- 2012 A single bench of the High Court of Kerala, set aside the show cause notice issued to Alpha Ventures by the Maradu panchayat.
- 2015 The division bench of the high court of Kerala gave its verdict on the matter. The show cause notice which was issued in 2007 by the panchayat was pointed out to be untenable and written in such a manner that it did not satisfy the rules. The Maradu municipality was blamed for the situation and the entire blame was placed on them. The Kerala Coastal Zone Management Authority (KCZMA) became a party to the case and moved the Supreme Court.
- 2018 The Supreme Court observed the builders did not give a reply to the show-cause notice issued by the panchayat and instead, filed writ petitions (WP) with the High Court. An expert committee was formed by the SC on 27 November 2018 to determine if the apartments are located in CRZ II or III. The three member committee reported that (as per the 1991 CRZ notification and the 1996 Kerala Coastal Zone Management Plan (KCZMP)), the area was CRZ III and not CRZ II. Maradu panchayat had issued the building permit without the permission of the KCZMA. The builders contended that the area was determined to be CRZ II as per the draft KCZMP created according to the 2011 CRZ notification. However, the argument of KCZMA was accepted by the Supreme Court.
- May 2019 The Supreme Court accepted the contention of the KCZMA and ordered the five apartments to be demolished within a month. The Kerala government has contracted IIT Madras to develop a model for demolition of the buildings. The one-month period lapsed and all the review and writ petitions filed by the residents of the different apartments were denied.
- September 2019 The Supreme Court, in an order issued on 6 September 2019 directed the state government to demolish the apartments and report by 20 September. Eviction notices were served to the residents subsequent to this. The residents say that they will resist the eviction.

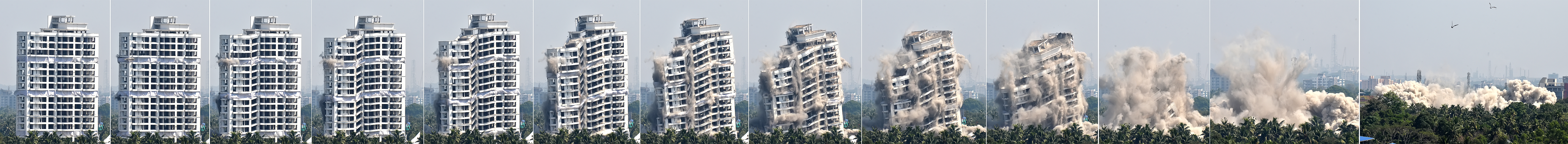
Holy Faith H2O Explosion sequence

=== Position of Golden Kayaloram residents ===
A curative petition was filed by the residents of Golden Kayaloram apartment on 10 September 2019. The petition was accepted by the court registry. It listed serious mistakes in 8 May Supreme Court order. The petition pointed out that a three-member technical committee was formed by the three member court appointed committee without the permission of the court.

The NOC was issued to Golden Kayaloram in 1995 (NO.A3.3/95) by the Secretary of Maradu Grama Panchayat and a copy of this was submitted as exhibit P1 in WP(C).No. 23293 of 2007 (W). This no objection certificate was issued by the Grama Panchayat before the Coastal Zone Management Plan (CZMP) of Kerala was approved in 1996.

The three member committee appointed by the Supreme Court of India had issued a notice to the builders of the apartments to respond about their CRZ status. No resident was asked to respond. The builder of Golden Kayaloram had submitted that "there are no CRZ violations alleged against M/s. Kayaloram Apartments by CZMA or any other authorities. Hence the proceedings with respect to CRZ violations is not sustainable against M/s. Kayaloram Apartments..."

== Maradu and CRZ II and III ==
CRZ I areas are those "areas that are ecologically sensitive and important, such as... wildlife habitats, mangroves,... coral reefs, ...close tobreeding and spawning grounds of fish and other marine life, ...rich in genetic-diversity, ...likely to be inundated due to rise in sea level consequent upon global warming and such other areas as may be declared....."

CRZ II areas are those "that have already been developed up to or close to the shoreline." "Developed area" is defined as "...area within the municipal limits or in other legally designated urban areas which is already substantially built up and which has been provided with drainage and approach roads and other infrastructural facilities, such as water supply and sewerage mains."

CRZ III is described as "the areas that are relatively undisturbed and those which do not belong to either Category-I or II. These will include coastal zone in the rural areas (developed and undeveloped) and also areas within Municipal limits or in other legally designated urban areas which are not substantially built up".

Maradu is currently a municipal area and even before it was converted into a municipality, it was a legally designated urban area since it came under the Greater Cochin Development Authority.

The DLF property on the same banks of Chilavannoor lake also is in violation of CRZ norms (CRZ-I). It was first ordered to be demolished in 2012 by the single bench of Kerala High Court, but was stayed by the division bench. Instead, the division bench allowed regularization of the building after imposing a fine of 1 crore. An appeal went against this overruling to the Supreme Court of India, but the verdict was upheld.

== In popular culture ==
- Vidhi is a 2021 Indian Malayalam-language film directed by Kannan Thamarakkulam, based on the Maradu apartments demolition order.

== Opinions ==
A Mumbai-based advocate and the president of National Lawyers Campaign for Judicial Transparency and Reforms said that as per notification issued in 2011 by the central government, Maradu was brought under CRZ II and that even if the buildings were demolished, they could be reconstructed at the same location. Rules are procedural laws brought by the executive for enforcing the acts of parliament. The rules which are applicable to the buildings now are the rules in force today. As CRZ II applies to the buildings in question and there is no violation. The procedure adopted by the Supreme Court in bypassing the Kerala Municipality Act and rules under it was without jurisdiction and shocking.
