= Hope (2006 film) =

- Directed by: Satish Kasetty
- Written by: Satish Kasetty
- Produced by: Policherla Venkata Subaiah
- Starring: Kalyani; D. Ramanaidu; Vizag Prasad
- Cinematography: Sarath
- Edited by: Basva Paidireddy
- Music by: Ilaiyaraaja
- Release date: 2006
- Language: Telugu

Hope is a 2006 Telugu film directed by Satish Kasetty. The film was showcased at International Film Festival of India in 2008. As director, he has won the National Film Award for Best Film on Other Social Issues. He was the jury member for South Region II at the 59th National Film Awards.

== Plot ==
The film deals with Teenage suicides, and educational stress in teenagers in South India.

== Cast ==
- Kalyani as Pooja
- D. Ramanaidu as RBVR Murthy
- Vizag Prasad as Professor Subramaniam
- Harnath Policherla as Harnath
- Raghunatha Reddy as Doctor
- Gundu Sudarshan as Rao, Pooja's father
- Ramachandra as Shakeel

== Awards ==
- National Film Award for Best Film on Other Social Issues - 2007
- Jury award from SICA for best film- 2007
