= V. C. Abhilash =

Indian film director and actor

V C Abhilash
- Born: Thiruvananthapuram, Kerala, India
- Occupations: Film director, scriptwriter, actor
- Spouse: Rakhi Krishna

V C Abhilash is an Indian film director and actor who works in Malayalam cinema. He began his career as a director and screenwriter in 2018 with the film Aalorukkam. The film was awarded in the 65th National Film Awards, and received the National Film Award for Best Film on Other Social Issues.

== Career ==
Abhilash started his film career as a director and scriptwriter for the film Aalorukkam (2018). His second film was Oru Supradhana Karyam (An Important Matter, 2018). He also acted in Aalorukkam as Pappu Pisharody's nephew.

== Filmography ==
- Aalorukkam (writer, director, actor)
- Sabaash Chandrabose (writer, director)

== Recognition ==
- National Film Awards for Best Film on Other Social Issues.
- Kashmir world film festival for best Indian movie .
- Kerala Film Critics Association Awards, for Second Best film.
- Official Selection – Kashmir world film festival, India
