= Holy Wound =

2022 Malayalam-language film

- Directed by: Asok. R. Nath
- Written by: Paul Wiclif
- Produced by: Sandeep. R
- Starring: Janaki Sudheer; Amrita Vinod; Sabu Praudeen
- Cinematography: Unni Madavoor
- Edited by: Vipin Mannoor
- Music by: Ronnie Raphael
- Production company: Sahasrara Cinemas
- Distributed by: Sahasrara Cinemas
- Release date: 12 August 2022
- Country: India
- Language: Malayalam

Holy Wound is a 2022 Malayalam silent film directed by Asok. R. Nath and written by Paul Wiclif. Janaki Sudheer, Amrita Vinod, Sabu Praudeen play lead roles. The film was produced by Sandeep. R for Sahasrara Cinemas. The music was by the Marakkar composer, Ronnie Raphael. Holy Wound explores bold themes related to lesbianism, which is unusual in Malayalam cinema. The film was released through direct OTT on 12 August 2022.

== Plot ==
The film depicts the story of two young homosexual women, one of whom is married to a man. She has no interest in sex with her husband. He brutally uses her for his sexual gratification. As she grieves over her husband's abuse, she remembers her homosexual friend, who is now a nun.

== Cast ==
- Janaki Sudheer
- Amrita Vinod as Nun
- Sabu Praudeen as Husband

== Production ==
Holy Wound was produced by Sandeep. R under the banner of Sahasrara Cinemas with Paul Wiclif as the writer, Unni Madavoor as the cinematographer, Vipin Mannoor as the editor. Ronnie Raphael composed the music. The film was released as a direct OTT release on 12 August 2022.
