= Bhanumati =

Bhānumati or Bhanumathi is an Indian name. It may refer to:

- Bhanumati (Yadava princess), a Yadava princess in the scripture, Harivamsha
- Bhanumati (wife of Duryodhana), wife of Duryodhana, the antagonist of the Indian epic Mahabharata
- P. Bhanumathi (1925-2005), Indian actress, director, and writer
- Bhanumati, Nepal, a village development committee in central Nepal
- Bhanumati (Raga), a Carnatic music scale, the fourth in the original Melakarta scheme
- Bhanumati (novel), the first Assamese novel, written by Padmanath Gohain Baruah in 1890
- Bhanumati Devi, Indian film actress

== Films ==
- Bhanumati Gari Mogudu, 1987 Indian film
- Bhanumathi & Ramakrishna, 2020 Indian romantic drama film by Srikanth Nagothi
