= A Violent Tale =

- Directed by: Arunlal
- Written by: Arunlal
- Produced by: Abhilash Dayanandan
- Cinematography: Arunlal
- Edited by: Arunlal
- Production company: Empty Company Productions
- Release date: 1 July 2022
- Country: India
- Language: Malayalam

A Violent Tale is a Malayalam language feature film written and directed by Arunlal and the duration of the movie is 95 minutes which falls into the "Crime thriller" genre. The movie features 32 debutant talented actors. The film released on streaming platform Saina Play on 1 July 2022. A Violent Tale started streaming on MX Player from 9 September 2022.

== Synopsis ==
Vikram and David are police officers investigating an unidentified contract killer. Shiva and Vishnu set out to avenge their father's murder. Maya is a girl who was captured by the drug lord Mark Antony. Raghu, Amir and Vincent are killing people for money. When the lives of these seemingly unrelated people are intertwined, violent events unfold.

== Plot ==
The frame opens to show a rider cruising like a man on a mission. He is an assassin handled by a contract killing firm. A silencer fitted pistol is his weapon of choice and he put a bullets to the target's head, once he gets the detail about the "unlucky". David and Vikram, two police officers are investigating the murder which is the latest case of murder spree which already claimed sixteen victims. David's phone rings and over the phone call David turns upset for having not being able to keep promise to his wife. Vikram, is his partner, who tries to help David whenever he needs it. The bloodthirsty trio of Vincent, Amir and Reghu roams the street with no sense of compassion. The trio is practically demons unleashed my Martin, police constable upon orders from Carlos his brother. The trio brutally murders a couple of men n receiving the command from Martin. The trio is ambitious and want to take the ante to next level. Vishnu and Siva are brothers and belong to an elite stratum of the society. Siva, the elder brother is one with a balanced head while Vishnu is more of a hot head. Vishnu, at the end of a heated argument points gun at stranger and Siva does his best and contain the matter by bribing the authorities and confiscate gun from his brother. Mark Antony, a don who is an alpha male lays his eyes on a girl, Maya and manipulates and forces her to be with him. His henchmen beat the girl's handlers to pulp and make Mark Antony make the girl as his. He proposes his love to the girl and she has no other go except to accept him. The killer is extending his kill spree as another two are shot by the signature "silencer fitted pistol". The cops are taking serious heat from superiors and the double homicide has become a nail in the coffin as far as the killer case is concerned. Vikram and David are instructed to handover the investigation to new team. To make matters worse, David finds out that his wife is having an affair with one of the deadly trio. This proves to be a fatal sucker punch for David's personal and professional life but Vikram tries to help as David blames himself as the reason for all these. Vishnu and Jagan Mohan are on their routine exercise workout as Jagan Mohan is shot to death and Vishnu couldn't be of much help. A twin murder is committed by the trio. Vikram gets their first breakthrough from a hidden USB from the apartment of the twin murder victims. By great police work they suspect Philips to be the master brain behind the murder. Vikram and David blackmails Philips to know about the whereabout of his killer whom he handles. They make Philips set an assignment for the serial killer and this time the person to be made a memory is Mark Anthony. Siva gets the wind about his father's killers and he is furious. Siva and Vishnu are getting ready to hunt their father's killers and the last goodbyes are exchanged between Shiva and his fiancé. The furious brothers take their revenge by killing Ajay Varma, the mastermind behind the killing and his attorney but they are not in a mood to stop yet and want to take their revenge on every person who took away their father. Meanwhile, the trio are set to maintain a low profile after the murder of Jagan Mohan as the media has gone full frenzy with the murder news. Carlos and Martin use them for money transit for a cocaine deal with Mark Anthony. The vital information from the attorney help Siva and Vishnu to head towards Carlos, Martin and the trio. The brother pays Carlos and Martin a visit and they murders Carlos and Martin once they get the location of Vincent and gang. Vincent and gang reach the destination which is Marks cafeteria for the deal and as the deal is in the process Siva and Vishnu reach there. Vikram and David who are already at the location keep waiting for the killer to arrive. Their wait has been shut down by the killer on his bike. Vikram and David pounce on the killer and they are in a Mexican standoff. Meanwhile, the trio and Mark and team are surprised by the unwelcomed guests. Vishnu attacks one of the trio in the wash room giving rise to a complete chaos. At the end of the shootout all men fall except for David and Vikram. They manage to save Maya. The movie ends in her frightened eyes.

== Crew ==
- Casting - Abhilash Dayanandan, Jithin P G
- Associate Director - Abhilash Dayanandan
- Assistant Directors - Jithin P G, Christi Thomas
- Art Director - Arjun Gangadharan
- Stunt Choreography - Arunlal, Jithin P G, Kiranlal
- Production Controller - Bobi Boni (Aswath Sivaraman)
- Production Coordinators - Abhilash Dayanandan, Jithin P G
- Finance Controller - Kiranlal
- Accounts - Reshma Abhilash
- Legal Advisor - Adv: Darsan V K
- Sound Design - Arunlal
- Background Music - Arjun Gangadharan
- Subtitles - Vaisakh Thampi
- Props Making Artist - Arunlal, abhilash Dayanandan, Jithin P G
- Makeup - Jithin P G
- Costume Design - Abhilash Dayanandan, Jithin P G
- Vfx Artist - Arunlal
- Vfx Supervisor - Abhilash Dayanandan
- Colour Grading - Arunlal
- Recording Studio - Afotech Innovation Pvt Ltd
- Foley Recording - Arunlal, Jithin P G, Nihal Gulam Rasul
- Foley Editing - Arunlal
- Production Food - Arjun Gangadharan
- Drivers - Abhilash Dayanandan, Arunlal, Jithin P G, Vipin Das V

== Cast ==
- Jithin P G as The Hitman
- Syamprakash S as David
- Abhilash Dayanandan as Vikram
- Teena Joseph as Lisa
- Midhun Haridas as Amir
- Arun Chandran as Raghu
- Jinn Parvesh as Vincent
- Anuroop Chandran as Siva
- Arjun Gangadharan as Vishnu
- Siji Daniel as Maya
- Suresh Babu as Mark Antony
- Nikhil Gulam Rasul as Victim 1
- Anish J as Victim 2
- Christi Thomas as Victim 3
- Adhipathy A as Martin
- Suresh Gopal as Carlos
- Niseeth Mohanan as Young Man
- Saju S Das as Police Officer
- Basheer Rahiman as Arif Bhai
- Gireesh Krishnan as Arif's Body Guard
- Sunil Balakrishnan as Pimp
- Linto George Nilayath as Mark's Body Guard 1
- Rafeek Ishal as Mark's Body Guard 2
- Jasheem Jamal as Victim 4
- Viswas V as Victim 5
- Kiranlal M as Victim 6
- Anil Palakkad as Siva's Father
- N Gulam Rasul as Philips
- Keerthy Vijayaraghavan as Madhumitha
- Dileep Divakaran Pallassena as Advocate
- Vipin Das V as Ajay Varma

== Song credits ==
- Song - When shadows turns to monster..
- Lyrics - Vaisakh Thampi
- Singer - Arjun Aravindi
- Music - Nikhil Aravind, Arjun Aravind

== Production ==
The film is produced by Empty Company Productions with a budget of 100000 INR. The shooting of the film took place at Palakkad in December 2020 during the COVID-19 lockdown. The team had completed production in December 2021. The official trailer of the movie was released through Saina Movies YouTube channel on 25 June 2022.
