= Sheelu Abraham =

Indian actress

- Born: Bharananganam, Kottayam, Kerala, India
- Occupation: Actress
- Years active: 2013–present
- Spouse: Abraham Mathew

Sheelu Abraham is an Indian actress who appears in Malayalam films.

Sheelu began her acting career in Weeping Boy, but it was the movie She Taxi which gave her recognition. She played the lead roles in films like Star and Vidhi, produced by Abraham Mathew, her husband, under the banner Abaam Movies.

== Filmography ==
Key
†	Denotes film or TV productions that have not yet been released

Year	Title	Role	Notes
2013	Weeping Boy	Dr. Rose	
2014	Manglish	Lalitha	
2015	She Taxi	Meera Mamman	
2015	Kanal	Revathy	
2016	Puthiya Niyamam	Jeena Bhai IPS	
2016	Aadupuliyattam	Amala	
2017	Save Water	Mom	Documentary film
2017	Puthan Panam	Sara Dominic IPS	
2017	Solo	Malini	Bilingual film
2017	Sadrishyavakyam	Anna	
2018	Rickshakkaran		
2019	Adhyapika	Alice teacher	short film
2019	Pattabhiraman	Vineetha	
2019	Subharathri	Dr.Sheela Abraham	
2020	Al Mallu	Dr.Diya	
2020	Neermezhukum Ormakal	Amma	Album
2021	Star	Ardra	
2021	Vidhi	Aleena	
2021	Pon Manickavel		Tamil film
2022	Trojan		
2022	Naalam Mura	Suma	
2022	Veekam	Renjini Warrier	
2024	Bad Boyz	Mary	
2025	Machante Maalakha	Adv. Lakshmi Rajan	
2025	Raveendra Nee Evide?	Bindhu	

== Television ==
Year	Programme	Role	Channel
2019	Onaruchimelam Season 3	Presenter	Asianet
2020	Atham Pathu Ruchi 2020	Celebrity presenter	Mazhavil Manorama
2022	Red Carpet	Mentor	Amrita TV
