= Rammohan Ravindran =

Indian actor

Rammohan
- Born: Thrissur, Kerala, India
- Occupation: Actor
- Years active: 2015 – present
- Organization: Ram De Studios
- Spouse: Deepthi Ram (m. 2009)
- Children: 2
- Parents: Ravindran; Jayasree

Rammohan (born 5 October) is an Indian actor who works in the Malayalam film industry. He debuted in the critically acclaimed movie Karie.

== Personal life ==
He married Deepthi on 6 April 2009, and has two children named Anavadhya and Sreejay.

== Filmography ==
=== Films ===
Year	Title	Role	Notes
2015	Karie	Bilal	
2022	Kudukku 2025	Varun	

=== Web series ===
Year	Title	Role	Director	Language
2020	Thudarum	Prasad	Bilahari	Malayalam, Telugu(Dubbed)
2021	Thudarum 2 Bhayam	Prasad	Bilahari	Malayalam

=== Musical Albums ===
Year	Title	Role	Director	Language
2012	Ente Bhalyam		Arshid Sreedhar	Malayalam
