= Aalorukkam =

- Film poster
- Directed by: V C Abhilash
- Written by: V C Abhilash
- Produced by: Jolly Lonappan
- Starring: Indrans; Srikanth Menon; Shaji AJohn
- Cinematography: Samlal P. Thomas
- Edited by: Vishnu Kalyani
- Music by: Ronnie Raphael
- Production company: Jollywood Movies
- Release date: 6 April 2018 (Kerala)
- Running time: 124 min
- Country: India
- Language: Malayalam

Aalorukkam is a 2018 Malayalam–language Indian film directed by debutant V C Abhilash starring Indrans in the lead role of the protagonist, an Ottan Thullal exponent.

The film won the National Film Award for Best Film on Other Social Issues while Indrans won the Kerala State Film Award for Best Actor for his widely acclaimed performance in the film.

== Plot ==
Aalorukkam portrays the struggles of Ottan Thullal exponent Pappu Pisharody, initially in search of his missing son, and later, struggling to accept her as she is.

== Cast ==
- Indrans as Pappu Pisharody
- Srikanth Menon (a.k.a. Srikanth K. Vijayan) as Transgender Priyanka
- Shaji AJohn as Raja
- Vishnu Agasthya
- Sajith Venugopalan Nambiar
- Sameera
- Sreeshma Vijayan
- Sajitha Saawariya
- Baby Threya
- Deepak Jayaprakashan
