= The Proposal (2022 film) =

2022 Malayalam film

- Directed by: Joe Joseph
- Written by: Joe Joseph
- Produced by: Silver Cloud Pictures
- Starring: Joe Joseph; Amara Raja; Anumodh Paul; Clair Sara Martin; Suhas Pattathil; Karthika Menon Thomas
- Cinematography: Fivaz Buys
- Edited by: Prince Sagar
- Release date: 27 May 2022
- Running time: 164 minutes
- Country: India
- Language: Malayalam
- Budget: 2.5 Lakhs Indian Rupees ($5000 USD Approx)

The Proposal is a 2022 Indian Malayalam-language musical and romantic comedy film written and directed by Joe Joseph, and produced by Silver Cloud Pictures. The film was released on 27 May 2022 as an OTT/Online Streaming film on Saina Play. The story, set in Australia, revolves around a student visa holder Davis Mizpah (Joe Joseph) and his friend Archith Kumar Chandran Cherupalassery (Anumodh Paul). Davis happens to meet Sandra (Amara Raja) through a matrimonial website which leads to a turn in his life.

== Plot ==
Davis arrives in Canberra, Australia as a student visa holder, one year after his friend Archith Kumar. During the course of his student visa, he intentionally falls in love with Anjana to get a permanent resident visa in Australia. In early 2020, Anjana goes to her home in Kerala and gets stuck there due to pandemic. Knowing that she is not coming back to Australia, Davis, along with Archith attempts for an unusual smuggling in hopes to attain a lump sum amount of money before they leave Australia. When that plan hilariously fails, Mathews and Reena who see Davis and Archith as their own younger brothers, advice Davis to lead a happy and normal life by getting married. Davis ventures to matrimonial website with a demand - "no dowry asked but sponsor me with a permanent visa in Australia". When Davis meets Sandra, who is a very free-spirit independent woman with a dreadful-turned-strong background, his life takes a turn.

== Cast ==
- Joe Joseph as Davis Mizpah
- Amara Raja as Sandra
- Anumodh Paul as Archith Kumar Chandran Cherupalassery
- Clair Sara Martin as Anjana
- Suhas Pattathil as Mathews
- Karthika Menon Thomas as Reena
- Sana Subedi as Nisha

== Production ==
Silver Cloud Pictures had scheduled to start principal photography of the film in Ooty from early 2020 but the project got abandoned due to the pandemic. Joe Joseph, who was originally assigned to write the script and play the character of Archith Kumar Chandran Cherupalassery suggested a revised modern production strategy to shoot the film in Australia with an extremely low budget. However, the director who was supposed to direct the film expressed an inconvenience to travel to Australia and left the project. Joe Joseph stepped up to a director and lead actor role in order to complete the film and a new casting call was conducted to cast new comers to all the roles in the film.

== Release ==
The Proposal released as an OTT film on 27 May 2022 on Saina Play OTT.

== Reception ==
The proposal received generally positive response. Mathrubhumi News reviewed the film as a "colourful entertainer"... An online critic channel SAP Media Channel criticised the movie's length and semi amateur making of some scenes due to the low budget while keeping the overall review as a "decent entertainer".

== Trivia ==
In 1992, the filming of a Malayalam film titled "Australia" was commenced in Australia. Mohanlal was the lead actor and Shankar, Ramya Krishnan and Jagadish were in other main roles. The film was proposed to be directed by Rajiv Anchal. Due to some unknown reasons, the project was abandoned without completing the filming. The shots that they took during this project was used in the Malayalam film Butterflies. After this, Malayalam film industry had never shot a film in Australia.

The Proposal is the first Malayalam feature film from Malayalam film industry to complete filming in Australia.

== Award ==
The proposal received "Cinematic Excellence" award in Malayalam language films category at the 2023 IIFTC Tourism Impact Award held in Mumbai on 12 October 2023.
