= Chilavannoor =

- town
- Location in Kerala, India
- Coordinates: 9°57′0″N 76°18′0″E
- Country: India
- State: Kerala
- District: Ernakulam

Languages
  - Official: Malayalam, English
- Time zone: UTC+5:30 (IST)
- Telephone code: 0484
- Vehicle registration: KL-
- Coastline: 0 kilometres (0 mi)
- Climate: Tropical monsoon (Köppen)
- Avg. summer temperature: 35 °C (95 °F)
- Avg. winter temperature: 20 °C (68 °F)

Chilavannoor, or Chilavannur, is a high-value residential area of Kochi in the state of Kerala, India. Chilavannoor Road serves as its main artery, running from the Elamkulam junction and is 3 km in length.

== Educational institutions nearby ==
- Traum Academy for German & French languages

The Chilavannoor Kayal (backwaters) and the Ponneth Bhagavathy Temple are the main tourist attractions of the area.
