= Vanaspati (raga) =

Fourth raga in the Melakarta

- Arohanam: S R₁ G₁ M₁ P D₂ N₂ Ṡ
- Avarohanam: Ṡ N₂ D₂ P M₁ G₁ R₁ S

Vanaspati (meaning the lord of the forest) is a ragam in Carnatic music (musical scale of South Indian classical music). It is the 4th melakarta rāgam in the 72 melakarta rāgams of Carnatic music, following the Katapayadi sankhya system. In the Muthuswami Dikshitar school of music, this raga is called Bhānumati.

== Structure and Lakshana ==
Vanaspati scale with shadjam at C

Vanaspati is the 4th rāgam in the 1st chakra Indu of the melakarta system. Its mnemonic name is Indu-Bhu. Its mnemonic phrase is sa ra ga ma pa dhi ni. Its ārohaṇa-avarohaṇa structure is as follows (see swaras in Carnatic music for details on this notation):

- ārohaṇa S R₁ G₁ M₁ P D₂ N₂ Ṡ (Note: Alternate notations: Hindustani: S Ṟ R M P D Ṉ Ṡ; Western: C D♭ E F G A B♭ C)
- avarohaṇa Ṡ N₂ D₂ P M₁ G₁ R₁ S (Note: Alternate notations: Hindustani: Ṡ Ṉ D P M R Ṟ S; Western: C B♭ A G F E D♭ C)

Shuddha rishabham, shuddha gandharam, shuddha madhyamam, chathusruthi dhaivatham and kaisiki nishadham are the swaras used in this scale. As it is a melakarta rāgam, by definition it is a sampoorna rāgam (has all seven notes in ascending and descending scale). It is the shuddha madhyamam equivalent of Navaneetam, which is the 40th melakarta rāgam.

== Asampurna Melakarta ==
Bhānumati is the 4th Melakarta in the original list compiled by Venkatamakhin. The notes used in the scale are the same, but the ascending scale is different. It is a shadava-sampurna raga (6 notes in ascending scale, while full 7 are used in descending scale).

- ārohaṇa: S R₁ M₁ P D₂ N₂ Ṡ (Note: Alternate notations: Hindustani: S Ṟ M P D Ṉ Ṡ; Western: C D♭ F G A B♭ C)
- avarohaṇa: Ṡ N₂ D₂ P M₁ G₁ R₁ S (Note: Alternate notations: Hindustani: Ṡ Ṉ D P M R Ṟ S; Western: C B♭ A G F E D♭ C)

== Janya rāgams ==
Rasāli is one of the better known of few janya ragams (derived scales) associated with Vanaspati. See List of janya rāgams for full list of rāgams associated with Vanaspati.
