= Veekam =

Indian Malayalam-language crime thriller film

- Directed by: Sagar Hari
- Written by: Sagar Hari
- Produced by: Sheelu Abraham; Abraham Mathew
- Cinematography: Dhanesh Raveendranath
- Edited by: Hareesh Mohan
- Music by: William Francis
- Production company: Abaam Movies
- Release date: 9 December 2022
- Running time: 120 minutes
- Country: India
- Language: Malayalam

Veekam (Malayalam: വീകം) is a 2022 Indian Malayalam-language crime thriller film written and directed by Sagar Hari. It is produced by Sheelu Abraham and Abraham Mathew under the banner of Abaam Movies. The film stars Dhyan Sreenivasan, Sheelu Abraham, Aju Varghese, Dain Davis, Jagadish, Dayyana Hameed, and Dinesh Prabhakar.

== Plot ==
Three forensic surgeons become entangled in a murder investigation following an incident of minor medical negligence. As they race to clear their names, the narrative unravels suspense and tension typical of a crime thriller, exploring themes of guilt, justice, and forensic ethics.

== Cast ==
- Dhyan Sreenivasan as Dr. Kiran
- Sheelu Abraham as Renjini Warrier IPS
- Aju Varghese as Martin Mavungal
- Dain Davis as Thoma
- Jagadish as Dr. Krishnamurthy
- Dayyana Hameed as Keerthi
- Dinesh Prabhakar as Sunny

== Production ==
The film is written and directed by Sagar Hari. It features music by William Francis, cinematography by Dhanesh Raveendranath, and editing by Hareesh Mohan. Production took place under Abaam Movies, with Sheelu Abraham and Abraham Mathew as producers. The film began production in October 2021.

== Release ==
=== Theatrical ===
The film was initially scheduled for release in first week of November 2022 but later got postponed. Finally film was released theatrically on 9 December 2022.

=== Home media ===
The film's digital and satellite rights are acquired by ZEE5 and Zee Keralam respectively. It was initially planned for digital release on 3 February 2023 but later postponed. The film was digitally released on 24 February 2023 in ZEE5.

== Reception ==
The film got mixed to negative reviews with praise for concept but criticised script, dialogues and performances.
