= List of awards and nominations received by Dulquer Salmaan =

Dulquer Salmaan awards and nominations
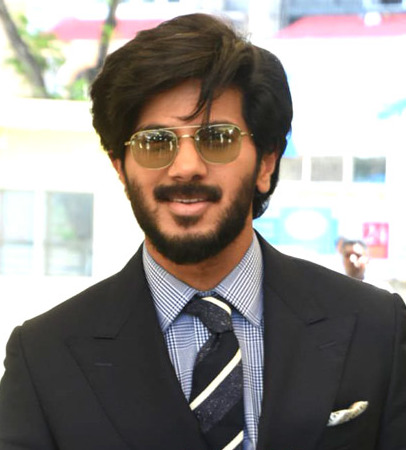
- Salmaan in 2019
Awards and nominations
Award	Wins	Nominations

Totals (Note: Certain award groups do not simply award one winner. They acknowledge several different recipients, have runners-up, and have third place. Since this is a specific recognition and is different from losing an award, runner-up mentions are considered wins in this award tally. For simplification and to avoid errors, each award in this list has been presumed to have had a prior nomination.)
- Wins: 26
- Nominations: 41

Dulquer Salmaan (/d̪ulkʰr̩ salmaːn/; born 28 July 1983), is an Indian actor, playback singer and film producer who predominantly works in Malayalam films in addition to Tamil, Telugu and Hindi films. He graduated with a bachelor's degree in business management from Purdue University and worked as a business manager in Dubai before pursuing a career in acting. Dulquer is a recipient of several awards including, five Filmfare Awards South, a Kerala State Film Award, a Kerala Film Critics Association Award, and a Gaddar Telangana State Film Award.

After a three-month acting course at the Barry John Acting Studio, Salmaan made his acting debut with Second Show (2012). He has since established himself as a leading actor in Indian cinema with several critically and commercially successful films including Ustad Hotel (2012), ABCD (2013), Neelakasham Pachakadal Chuvanna Bhoomi (2013), Vaayai Moodi Pesavum (2014), Bangalore Days (2014), Vikramadithyan (2014), O Kadhal Kanmani (2015), Charlie (2015), Kali (2016), Jomonte Suvisheshangal (2017), Mahanati (2018), Kurup (2021) and Sita Ramam (2022).

He has been recognised in the media as a fashion icon and an auto enthusiast. He owns several entrepreneurship ventures and promotes various social causes. He is also the founder of the film production company Wayfarer Films.

== Awards and nominations ==
List of Dulquer Salmaan awards and nominations
Year	Award	Category	Film	Result	Ref.
2012	Asiavision Awards	Best Newcomer	Second Show	Won	
2013	Asianet Film Awards	Best New Face (Male)	Second Show	Won	
2013	Vanitha Film Awards	Best New Face (Male)	Second Show	Won	
2013	Vanitha Film Awards	Best Star Pair	Ustad Hotel	Won	
2013	Filmfare Awards South	Best Actor – Malayalam	Ustad Hotel	Nominated	
2013	Filmfare Awards South	Best Male Debut – South	Ustad Hotel	Won	
2013	South Indian International Movie Awards	Best Debut (Male)	Second Show	Won	
2013	Asiavision Awards	Performer of the Year	Various	Won	
2014	Asianet Film Awards	Star of the Year	Various	Won	
2014	Asiavision Awards	Performer of The Year	Bangalore Days, Vikramadithyan	Won	
2015	Asianet Film Awards	Star of the Year	Bangalore Days, Vikramadithyan	Won	
2015	Filmfare Awards South	Best Actor – Malayalam	Njaan	Nominated	
2015	Filmfare Awards South	Best Debut (Male)	Vaayai Moodi Pesavum	Won	
2015	South Indian International Movie Awards	Best Debut (Male)	Vaayai Moodi Pesavum	Nominated	
2015	South Indian International Movie Awards	Best Actor	Njaan	Nominated	
2015	Vanitha Film Awards	Best Star Pair	Vikramadithyan	Won	
2015	Vijay Awards	Best Debut (Male)	Vaayai Moodi Pesavum	Won	
2015	Vikatan Awards	Best Debut (Male)	Vaayai Moodi Pesavum	Won	
2016	Asianet Film Awards	Most Popular Actor	Charlie	Won	
2016	Filmfare Awards South	Best Actor – Malayalam	Charlie	Nominated	
2016	Kerala State Film Awards	Best Actor	Charlie	Won	
2016	South Indian International Movie Awards	Best Actor	Charlie	Nominated	
2016	South Indian International Movie Awards	Best Male Playback Singer	Charlie	Nominated	
2017	Asianet Film Awards	Best Actor (Critics)	Kammatipaadam, Kali	Won	
2017	2nd IIFA Utsavam	Best Actor	Charlie	Won	
2017	2nd IIFA Utsavam	Best Male Playback Singer	Charlie	Nominated	
2017	Filmfare Awards South	Critics Best Actor – Malayalam	Kali, Kammatipaadam	Won	
2017	South Indian International Movie Awards	Best Actor	Kammatipaadam	Nominated	
2017	Asiavision Awards	Best Actor	Solo, Comrade in America, Parava	Won	
2018	Asianet Film Awards	Golden Star	Solo, Jomonte Suvisheshangal, Parava	Won	
2018	Vanitha Film Awards	Popular Actor	Solo, Jomonte Suvisheshangal, Parava, Comrade in America	Won	
2019	South Indian International Movie Awards	Best Actor – Telugu	Mahanati	Nominated	
2019	Filmfare Awards South	Best Actor – Telugu	Mahanati	Nominated	
2019	Filmfare Awards South	Critics Best Actor – Telugu	Mahanati	Won	
2021	Filmfare Awards South	Best Actor – Tamil	Kannum Kannum Kollaiyadithaal	Nominated	
2021	South Indian International Movie Awards	Best Actor	Kannum Kannum Kollaiyadithaal	Nominated	
2021	Kerala Film Critics Association Awards	Best Actor	Kurup, Salute	Won	
2023	South Indian International Movie Awards	Best Actor – Telugu	Sita Ramam	Nominated	
2024	Filmfare Awards South	Best Actor – Telugu	Sita Ramam	Nominated	
2024	Filmfare Awards South	Critics Best Actor – Telugu	Sita Ramam	Won	
2025	Gaddar Telangana State Film Award	Special Jury Award	Lucky Baskhar	Won	

== See also ==
- Dulquer Salmaan filmography
