= Dulquer Salmaan filmography =

List of films with Dulquer Salmaan

Dulquer Salmaan Filmography
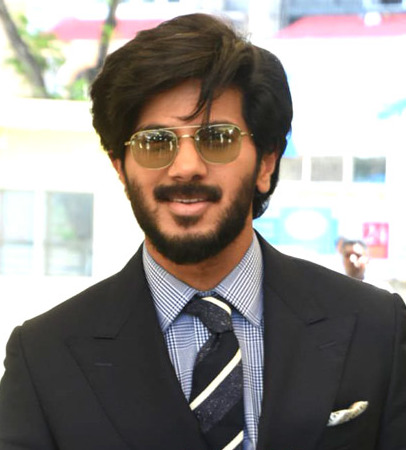
- Dulquer Salmaan in 2019

Films
- Malayalam: 28
- Telugu: 7
- Tamil: 5
- Hindi: 3

Dulquer Salmaan is an Indian actor, playback singer and film producer who works predominantly in Malayalam films, besides a few Tamil, Telugu and Hindi films. He graduated with a bachelor's degree in business management from Purdue University and worked as a business manager in Dubai before pursuing a career in acting. Dulquer is a recipient of several awards including, five Filmfare Awards South, a Kerala State Film Award, a Kerala Film Critics Association Award, and a Telangana Gaddar Film Award.

After a three-month acting course at the Barry John Acting Studio, Salmaan made his acting debut with Second Show (2012). He has since established himself as a leading actor in Indian cinema with several critically and commercially successful films including Ustad Hotel (2012), ABCD (2013), Neelakasham Pachakadal Chuvanna Bhoomi (2013), Vaayai Moodi Pesavum (2014), Bangalore Days (2014), Vikramadithyan (2014), O Kadhal Kanmani (2015), Charlie (2015), Kali (2016), Kammatipaadam (2016), Jomonte Suvisheshangal (2017), Mahanati (2018), Kannum Kannum Kollaiyadithaal (2020), Kurup (2021), Sita Ramam (2022), Lucky Baskhar (2024) and Aakasamlo Oka Tara (2026).

== Malayalam Films ==
Key
†	Denotes films that have not yet been released

List of Dulquer Salmaan films and roles
Year	Title	Role	Notes	Ref.
2012	Second Show	Harilal "Lalu"	Debut film	
2012	Ustad Hotel	Faizal "Faizi" Abdul Razak		
2012	Theevram	Harsha Vardhan		
2013	ABCD: American-Born Confused Desi	Jones Isaac		
2013	5 Sundarikal	Injured stuntman	Anthology film; Kullante Bharya segment	
2013	Neelakasham Pachakadal Chuvanna Bhoomi	Kassi		
2013	Pattam Pole	Karthikeyan "Karthi"		
2014	Salalah Mobiles	Afzal		
2014	Bangalore Days	Arjun "Aju"		
2014	Vikramadithyan	Adithyan Menon "Aadhi"		
2014	Njaan	K. T. N. Kottoor & Ravi Chandrasekhar (Note: Salmaan played two characters.)	Dual role	
2015	100 Days of Love	Balan K. Nair & Rocky K. Nair	Dual role	
2015	Charlie	Charlie		
2016	Kali	Siddharth		
2016	Kammatipaadam	Krishnan		
2016	Annmariya Kalippilaanu	Angel	Cameo	
2017	Jomonte Suvisheshangal	Jomon T. Vincent		
2017	Comrade in America	Aji "Ajipan" Mathew		
2017	Parava	Imran	Extended Cameo	
2017	Solo	Shekhar, Trilok, Siva & Rudra Ramachandran (Note: Salmaan played four characters.)	Bilingual film; Quadruple role	
2019	Oru Yamandan Premakadha	Mohanlal John Kombanayil alias Lallu		
2020	Varane Avashyamund	Bibeesh P. "Fraud"	Also producer	
2020	Maniyarayile Ashokan	Arjun	Cameo; Also producer	
2021	Kurup	Sudhakara Kurup / Gopi Krishnan Pillai / Alexander Gelmosby	Also producer	
2022	Salute	Aravind Karunakaran	Also producer	
2023	King of Kotha	Raju Madrassi alias "Kotha Raju"	Also producer	
2025	Lokah Chapter 1: Chandra	Charlie	Cameo; Also producer	
2026	I'm Game	Dan John	Also producer	

== Other language films ==
Key
†	Denotes films that have not yet been released

Year	Film	Role	Language	Notes	Ref
2014	Vaayai Moodi Pesavum	Aravind	Tamil	Bilingual film; Tamil debut; Shot simultaneously in Malayalam as Samsaaram Arogyathinu Haanikaram	
2015	O Kadhal Kanmani	Aditya "Aadhi" Varadarajan	Tamil		
2018	Mahanati	Gemini Ganesan	Telugu		
2018	Karwaan	Avinash Rajpurohit	Hindi		
2019	The Zoya Factor	Nikhil Khoda	Hindi		
2020	Kannum Kannum Kollaiyadithaal	Siddharth	Tamil		
2022	Hey Sinamika	Yaazhan	Tamil		
2022	Sita Ramam	Lieutenant Ram	Telugu		
2022	Chup: Revenge of the Artist	Sebastian Gomes aka Danny	Hindi		
2024	Kalki 2898 AD	Captain	Telugu	Cameo	
2024	Lucky Baskhar	Baskhar Kumar	Telugu		
2025	Kaantha	Thiruchengode Kalidasa Mahadevan "TKM"	Tamil	Also producer	
2025	Champion	George C. Williams	Telugu	Cameo	
2026	Aakasamlo Oka Tara	Krishna	Telugu		
2027	Sri Sri †	TBA	Telugu	Filming	

== Television ==
List of Dulquer Salmaan television credits
Year	Title	Role	Language	Network	Ref.
2023	Guns & Gulaabs	Arjun Varma	Hindi	Netflix	

== Music video ==
List of Dulquer Salmaan music video credits
Year	Title	Performers	Language	Ref.
2023	"Heeriye"	Jasleen Royal, Arijit Singh	Hindi	
2026	"Bheegi Bheegi"	A R Ameen, Jasleen Royal	Hindi	

== Other crew positions ==
Year	Title	Role	Language	Ref.
2014	Koothara	Trailer narrator	Malayalam	
2016	Mudhugauv	Narrator	Malayalam	
2017	Pokkiri Simon	Narrator	Malayalam	
2019	Margamkali	Baby (voice)	Malayalam	
2020	Maniyarayile Ashokan	Co-producer; Narrator	Malayalam	
2021	Maara	Voiceover in trailer	Malayalam	
2022	Upacharapoorvam Gunda Jayan	Distributor, producer	Malayalam	
2022	Pyali	Co-producer; distributor	Malayalam	
2022	Rorschach	Distributor	Malayalam	
2023	Nanpakal Nerathu Mayakkam	Distributor	Malayalam	
2023	Adi	Producer, distributor	Malayalam	
2023	Kannur Squad	Distributor	Malayalam	
2023	Kaathal – The Core	Distributor	Malayalam	
2024	Turbo	Distributor	Malayalam	
2024	Devara: Part 1	Distributor	Malayalam	
2025	Dominic and the Ladies' Purse	Distributor	Malayalam	
2025	3BHK	Distributor	Malayalam	
2025	Su From So	Distributor	Malayalam	
2025	Chatha Pacha: The Ring Of Rowdies	Distributor	Malayalam	
2026	Youth	Distributor	Malayalam	

== See also ==
- List of awards and nominations received by Dulquer Salmaan
