= Arthi Venkatesh =

Indian model and actress

- Born: Chennai, Tamil Nadu, India
- Other name: Arthi Anirudha
- Education: Bachelors in Visual Communication
- Alma mater: Loyola College, Chennai
- Occupations: Model; actress
- Years active: 2008–present
- Height: 5 ft 9 in (175 cm)
- Spouse: Anirudha Srikkanth (divorced)

Arthi Venkatesh is an Indian model and socialite from Chennai. After appearing in commercials and portfolios in the late 2000s, she made her acting debut through Bejoy Nambiar's bilingual film Solo (2017).

== Career ==
Arthi Venkatesh was born in Chennai to a Telugu-speaking family. She graduated with a degree in visual communications from Loyola College, Chennai and pursued a course in interior design from Bangalore. During her time in Bangalore, she became acquainted with fashion stylist Prasad Bidapa, who suggested that she should partake in the Miss India pageant, and subsequently Arthi pursued a career in modelling.

She briefly moved to New York to further her career in fashion. Her first introduction to the international fashion industry took place during the New York Fashion Week, where she was noticed by Jovani and Morrell Maxie and eventually walked for them at the New York Bridal Fashion Week. She is considered as a socialite in Chennai. As of 2017, Arthi has had about 250 runway shows and more than 350 photo shoots to her credit.

Despite receiving acting offers from the likes of Mani Ratnam and Shanoo Sharma of Yash Raj Films, Arthi had been reluctant to enter the film industry early in her career. In 2016, Arthi accepted an acting offer from director Bejoy Nambiar and took up acting training to work on the film. Although the film was shelved, he later offered her a role in Tamil-Malayalam bilingual, Solo (2017) opposite Dulquer Salmaan. She shot for the film for a week in Kochi, and it remains her only acting venture to date. In 2018, she appeared as a judge on the reality show Kadhalika Neramillai alongside Sathish Krishnan.

== Personal life ==
She was married to the Indian cricketer Anirudha Srikkanth.

== Filmography ==
Year	Film	Role	Language	Notes
2017	Solo	Ayesha	Malayalam; Tamil	Segment : World of Trilok
