= Walid Riachy =

Lebanese actor (born 1990)

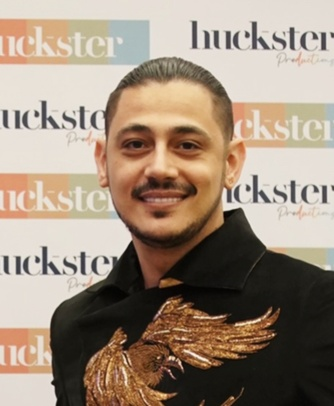
- Riachy in 2021
- Born: 26 September 1990 (age 35); Beirut, Lebanon
- Occupations: Actor; model
- Years active: 2017–present
- Website: walidriachy.com

Walid Riachy (born 26 September 1990) is a Lebanese actor and model, who mostly appears in Mollywood and Hollywood films as well as international commercials. He completed a bachelor's degree program in business management at the American University of Beirut and worked as a business manager in Dubai before deciding to pursue an acting career.

Riachy received his first job in a Sinecode Arabia Commercial, which was produced and directed by Gray Mena agency, after spending six months performing in Miranda Davidson studio. In Dubai, he made a name for himself as a top actor in commercials. With his participation in fashion shows like Runway Dubai - Dubai Fashion Show, Heaven Gaia, and many others, he has gained media recognition as a fashion icon.

After experiencing considerable success as a model, he turned his attention more toward acting. He appeared in films like Kurup (2021) and The Misfits (2021).

== Early life and family ==
Riachy was born in Beirut-Jal el dib on September 26, 1990. He finished his elementary education at St. George's zalka school and his secondary education at Jal el Dib's official school. He graduated from AUB University with a bachelor's degree in business management, and after working for several different organizations in Dubai, he continued to launch his own company, Bodykits Aerodynamics. He afterwards made the decision to pursue an acting profession and spent six months studying at the Miranda Davidson school in the United Arab Emirates.

== Career ==
=== Early years (2016-18) ===
Riachy started his modeling career in 2015 at the age of 25. He gained immense popularity in Lebanon being a fashion model, influencer and content creator. Later, he moved to Dubai to join The Bareface Modeling Agency. He has modeled for various fashion houses and organisations such as floating luxury hotel, Queen Elizabeth 2. He has done commercials on Sinecode Arabia, DP World Dubai, & has walked on fashion shows like Sustainable Fashion Show Dubai, Runaway Dubai Fashion Show etc.

=== 2018 to present ===
Walid was covertly working on the 2019 Hollywood production The Misfits, which was directed by Renny Harlin and starring Pierce Brosnan as Richard Pace with many other well-known performers including Nick Canon and Jamie Chung.

Walid was chosen to serve as Rami Jaber's body duplicate and stunt double in addition to his starring part as the prison guard in the scene with Hermione Corfield.

On 3 June 2021, The Misfits made its international debut in South Korea. On 11 June 2021, the movie was released by Highland Film Group and The Avenue Entertainment. Walid made the decision to pursue his acting and modeling profession in 2020. He took part in several TV advertisements, including those for Belvita, DP World Dubai, the Presidential Cup UAE, and many more. He made his acting debut with Kurup (2021). In this film he starred as Arab Prince Walid, alongside protagonist Dulquer Salman. Subsequently, he appeared in a Hollywood film named The Misfits (2021) in a minor role, which stars Pierce Brosnan in the lead role.

== Filmography ==
Key
†	Denotes films that have not yet been released

List of films and roles
Year	Title	Role	Language	Notes	Ref.
2021	The Misfits		English		
2021	Kurup	Prince Walid	Malayalam		
