= Butterfly (2022 film) =

Indian Telugu-language mystery thriller film

- Release poster
- Directed by: Ghanta Satish Babu
- Produced by: Ravi Prakash Bodapati; Prasad Tiruvalluri; Pradeep Nallimelli
- Starring: Anupama Parameswaran
- Cinematography: Sameer Reddy
- Edited by: Madhu
- Music by: Arviz; Gideon Katta
- Release date: 29 December 2022
- Country: India
- Language: Telugu

Butterfly is a 2022 Indian Telugu-language mystery thriller film directed by Ghanta Satish Babu and starring Anupama Parameswaran. The film was released directly on Disney+ Hotstar.

== Cast ==
- Anupama Parameswaran as Geeta
- Nihal Kodhaty as Viswa
- Bhumika Chawla as Vyjayanthi
- Rao Ramesh
- Praveen
- Meghana Thota as Baby

== Reception ==
A critic from The Times of India wrote that "This attempted thriller is an assault on one’s senses. However, Anupama’s performance and decent production values are the takeaways from this otherwise passable film". A critic from The New Indian Express wrote that "Anupama Parameswaran is perhaps the only lifeline of the film, playing an exhausted, helpless woman thrown into an arduous situation".
