= Sukumara Kurup =

Most Wanted Indian fugitive

- Born: P. K. Gopalakrishna Kurup; 25 May 1946 (age 80); Chengannur, Travancore State, British Raj
- Spouse: Sarasamma
- Criminal charges: Murder, Insurance fraud
- Wanted by: Kerala State Police Department; Interpol
- Wanted since: 1984

Sukumara Kurup (alias Sukumara Pillai) (born as P. K. Gopalakrishna Kurup) an Indian fugitive and is one of the most-wanted criminals in the Indian state of Kerala. On 21 January 1984, he, along with his brother-in-law Bhaskara Pillai, his driver Ponnappan and his aide Shahu, murdered a man named Chacko in an attempt to fake Kurup's own death and thereby claim a life insurance amount of INR 8,00,000 (approximately USD 80,000 in 1984, which is equivalent to Rs. 72 lakhs in 2026). The subterfuge was soon exposed by the police, who arrested Bhaskara Pillai, Ponnappan and Shahu. However, Kurup absconded from the state in the meantime. Notorious for being India's longest wanted fugitive, Kurup has been missing since 1984.

Reports regarding Sukumara Kurup's potential whereabouts surfaced in August 2026 following unconfirmed media claims of a sighting in Brunei. However, Kerala Police clarified that the individual pictured was Damodara Menon, a Thrissur native, and Kurup's status remains officially unverified.

== Early life ==
Sukumara Kurup was born as P. K. Gopalakrishna Kurup to Malayali Nair parents, Puthenveettil Shivarama Pillai and his wife Mrs. Kurup, near Cheriyanad, Travancore State, British Raj (present-day Alappuzha district, Kerala, India). After completing his studies, he joined the Indian Air Force as an airman, where he was referred to as Gopalakrishna Pillai. Later, he left the IAF and moved to the Middle East, becoming an executive with a marine petroleum company in Abu Dhabi, where he is known as Sukumara Kurup.

== Murder of Chacko ==
Chacko was forcefully intoxicated, poisoned and strangled to death and later the body was burnt inside an Ambassador car at night near Tannimukkam Puncha in Mavelikara. Sukumara Kurup allegedly committed the crime to fake his own death and claim an insurance amount of ₹800,000, by killing Chacko, who bore a striking resemblance to him. It is assumed that Kurup fled the country after the incident, while two of his three accomplices, driver Ponnappan and brother-in-law Bhaskara Pillai, were sentenced to a life-term imprisonment. His other accomplice, Chinnakkal Shahu, was arrested, but was later made an approver and released. He is the only living eye-witness of the murder of Chacko. According to the police, Sukumara Kurup is still on the list of absconding accused since January 1984. The Chacko murder case is one of the longest-standing cases in the judicial history of Kerala. In 2018, Chacko's wife, Santhamma, told Bhaskaran that she forgives him and the others (including Kurup) when they met near the St Thomas Malankara Syrian Catholic Church at Chengannur.

The Chacko murder case is one case that caught the media's attention during the mid-2000s, when there were reports on Sukumara Kurup lookalikes from various parts of India. Since Kurup's remains still remain untraced, it's unclear as to whether he's dead or alive. Victims of his crime believe he could be alive and well in a foreign country based on what the investigating officer wrote while closing the case after 12 years of search (1984 to 1996): Kurup had fled from the country with the 72 hours head start he got and with possible help from political allies because after the murder came to light, he was able to narrowly escape multiple times from the police.

However, it is believed by police that Kurup was found multiple times in India under the alias Joshi, and may have already died due to severe cardiac issues. Doctors that had attended him made the prognosis in 1990 that his condition was so bad that after fleeing, he could not have survived for long.

== In popular culture ==
In 1984, the Malayalam film NH 47, directed by Baby, drew inspiration from the Chacko murder case. Sukumaran portrayed the victim under the name Rahim, while T. G. Ravi took on the role of the killer.

In 2016, director Adoor Gopalakrishnan presented another fictional narrative, Pinneyum featuring Dileep and Kavya Madhavan, loosely based on the original incident.

In 2021, Srinath Rajendran directed a crime thriller biopic, Kurup, revolving around Sukumara Kurup. This fictional film stars Dulquer Salmaan as Sudhakara Kurup, Tovino Thomas as the victim (Charlie), and is told from the perspective of investigative officer S. P. Krishnadas IPS, a character inspired by the real investigator S. P. Haridas IPS played by Indrajith Sukumaran.

== See also ==
- List of fugitives from justice who disappeared
