= Anupama Parameswaran =

Indian actress (born 1996)

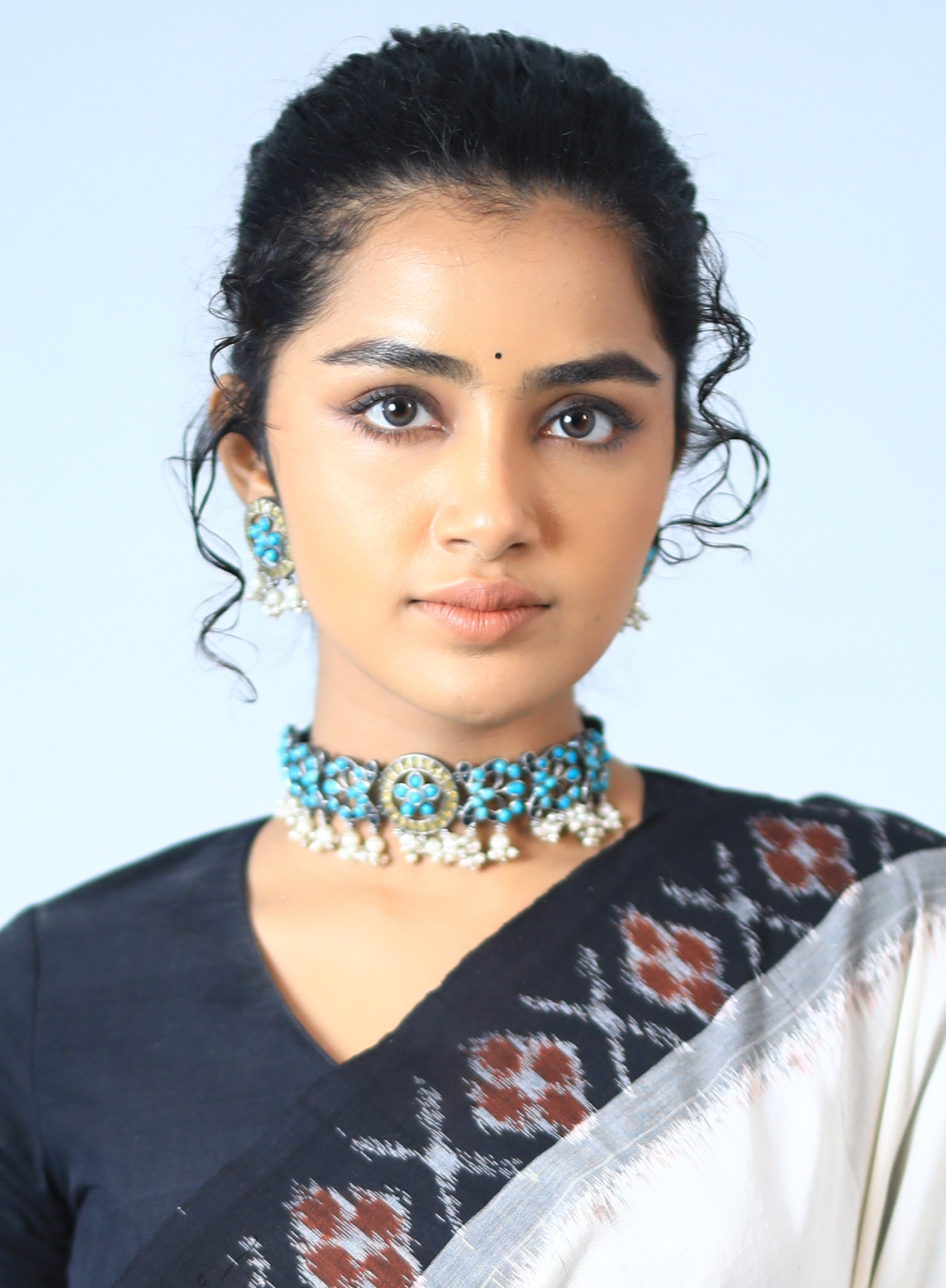
- Anupama in 2022
- Born: 18 February 1996 (age 30); Irinjalakuda, Kerala, India
- Education: CMS College Kottayam
- Occupation: Actress
- Years active: 2015–present

Anupama Parameswaran (born 18 February 1996) is an Indian actress who primarily works in Telugu, Malayalam and Tamil films. Anupama made her debut with the successful Malayalam film Premam (2015) and is known for her work in Kodi (2016), Jomonte Suvisheshangal (2017), Vunnadhi Okate Zindagi (2017), Natasaarvabhowma (2019), Karthikeya 2 (2022), Tillu Square (2024), Dragon (2025) and Paradha (2025).

== Early life ==
Anupama was born on 18 February 1996 into a Malayali family at Irinjalakuda in the Thrissur district of Kerala to Parameswaran Erekkath and Sunitha. She has a younger brother, Akshay. After completing her schooling at the Don Bosco School, Irinjalakuda, she studied at CMS College Kottayam, where she majored in Communicative English until she discontinued her education to pursue acting.

== Career ==
Anupama debuted with Premam alongside Nivin Pauly, which was a commercial success. She then had a cameo in James & Alice, a Malayalam film. Later she forayed into Telugu films with a handful of projects including A Aa, where she played a lead role along with Nithiin and Samantha Ruth Prabhu. She then was in the Telugu remake of Premam. Her next film was Kodi, her debut in Tamil cinema, in which she had the lead role opposite Dhanush. She also acted alongside Sharwanand in the Telugu film Shatamanam Bhavati which was released in January 2017, followed by Jomonte Suvisheshangal in Malayalam alongside Dulquer Salmaan released in the same month. After Vunnadhi Okate Zindagi opposite Ram Pothineni, she worked on Merlapaka Gandhi's Krishnarjuna Yudham opposite Nani and A. Karunakaran's Tej I Love You opposite Sai Dharam Tej. She was again paired alongside Ram Pothineni in Hello Guru Prema Kosame. In 2019, Anupama debuted with Natasaarvabhowma in Kannada cinema alongside Puneeth Rajkumar. She then appeared in Telugu film Rakshasudu. In 2021, she was paired opposite Atharvaa in Tamil film Thalli Pogathey. In 2022, she was paired opposite debutant Ashish in Telugu film Rowdy Boys. Her second Telugu film in the same year was in Karthikeya 2, which served as a sequel to Karthikeya (2014).

In 2024, Anupama acted in Tillu Square, the sequel to Tillu, starring alongside Siddhu Jonnalagadda, released on 29 March 2024. In 2025, she played the lead role of Subbu in Paradha, a Telugu-language comedy drama directed by Praveen Kandregula.

In late January 2026, the Tamil film Lockdown was released.

== Media image ==
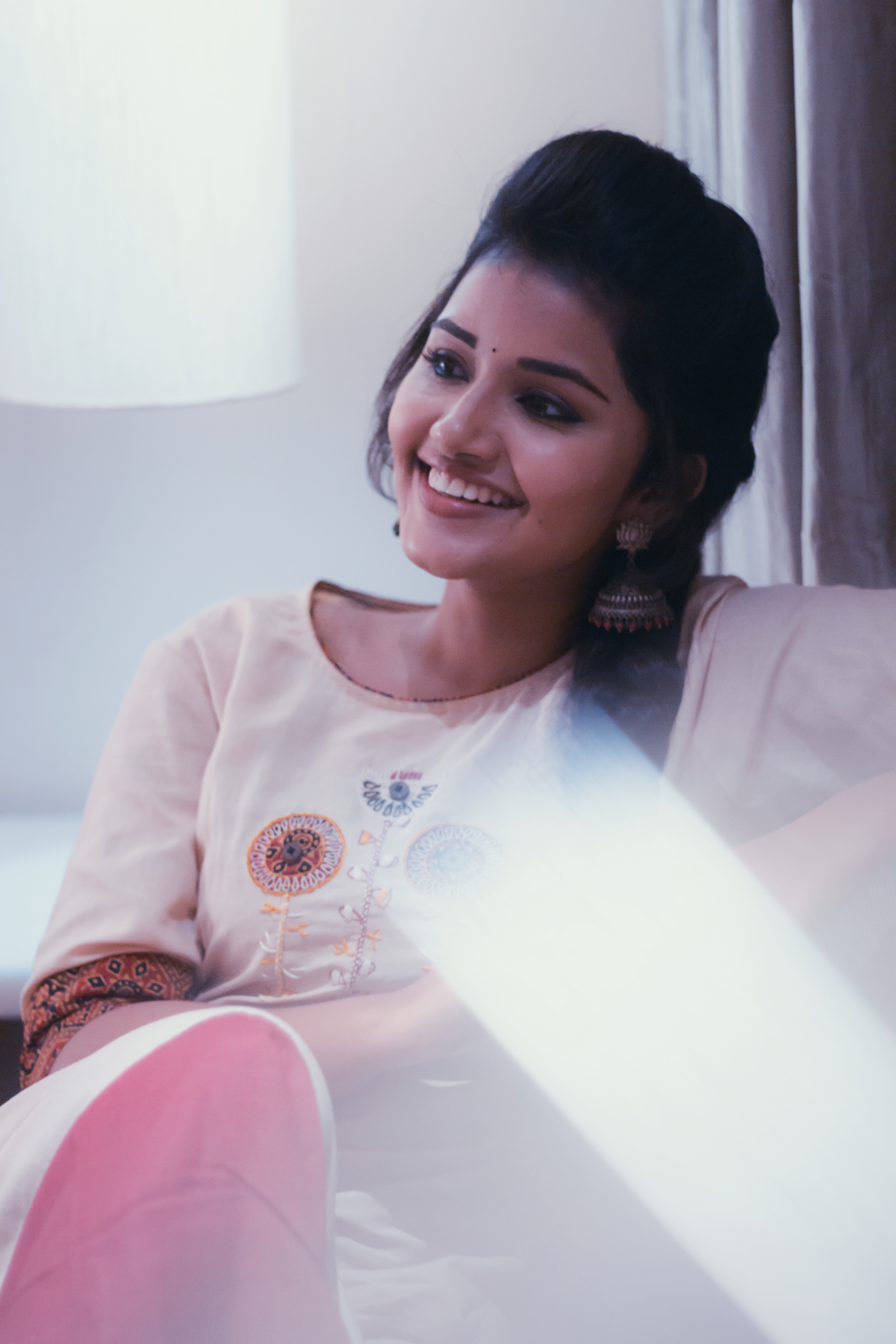
Anupama in 2018

Anupama has featured in Hyderabad Times 30 Most Desirable Woman list. She was placed 30th in 2018, 21st in 2019 and 27th in 2020. In 2021, she became the 10th most tweeted-about South Indian actress.

== Filmography ==
=== Films ===
Key
†	Denotes films that have not yet been released

Year	Title	Role(s)	Language(s)	Notes	Ref.
2015	Premam	Mary George	Malayalam		
2016	James & Alice	Adult Isabel "Pinky"	Malayalam		
2016	Kodi	Malathi	Tamil		
2016	A Aa	Nagavalli "Valli"	Telugu		
2016	Premam	Suma	Telugu		
2017	Sathamanam Bhavati	Nithya	Telugu		
2017	Jomonte Suvisheshangal	Catherine	Malayalam		
2017	Vunnadhi Okate Zindagi	Maha Lakshmi "Maha"	Telugu		
2018	Krishnarjuna Yudham	Subba Lakshmi	Telugu		
2018	Tej I Love You	Nandini	Telugu		
2018	Hello Guru Prema Kosame	Anupama	Telugu		
2019	Rakshasudu	Krishnaveni	Telugu		
2019	Natasaarvabhowma	Shruthi	Kannada		
2020	Maniyarayile Ashokan	Shyama	Malayalam	Also assistant director	
2021	Kurup	Sicily	Malayalam	Cameo	
2021	Freedom @ Midnight	Chandra Das	Malayalam	Short film; released on YouTube	
2021	Thalli Pogathey	Pallavi	Tamil		
2022	Rowdy Boys	Dr.Kavya	Telugu		
2022	Ante Sundaraniki	Soumya	Telugu	Extended cameo	
2022	Karthikeya 2	Mugdha	Telugu		
2022	18 Pages	Nandini	Telugu		
2022	Butterfly	Geetha	Telugu		
2024	Eagle	Nalini	Telugu		
2024	Tillu Square	Lilly Joseph	Telugu		
2024	Siren	Jennifer Thilagavarman	Tamil		
2025	Dragon	Keerthi	Tamil		
2025	JSK: Janaki V v/s State of Kerala	Janaki Vidhyadharan	Malayalam		
2025	Paradha	Subbalakshmi	Telugu		
2025	Kishkindhapuri	Mythili	Telugu		
2025	The Pet Detective	Kaikeyi	Malayalam		
2025	Bison Kaalamaadan	Raani	Tamil		
2026	Lockdown	Anitha	Tamil		
2026	Mareechika	Venkata Lakshmi	Telugu		
2026	Crazy Kalyanam	Keerthi	Telugu		
2026	Bhogi †	Kandula Sulochana Rani	Telugu	Filming	

== Awards and nominations ==
Year	Award	Category	Film	Result	Ref.
2016	South Indian International Movie Awards	Best Female Debut – Malayalam	Premam	Nominated	
2017	IIFA Utsavam	Best Supporting Actress – Telugu	Premam	Won	
2017	South Indian International Movie Awards	Best Supporting Actress – Telugu	Premam	Nominated	
2017	Filmfare Awards South	Best Supporting Actress – Tamil	Kodi	Nominated	
2017	Filmfare Awards South	Best Supporting Actress – Telugu	A Aa	Nominated	
2017	Zee Cine Awards Telugu	Girl Next Door	A Aa	Won	
2017	Zee Cine Awards Telugu	Debutant of the Year	A Aa	Nominated	
2017	Zee Cine Awards Telugu	Entertainer of the Year – Female	Sathamanam Bhavati & Vunnadhi Okate Zindagi	Nominated	
