= Filmfare Critics Award for Best Actor – Telugu =

Indian annual film award

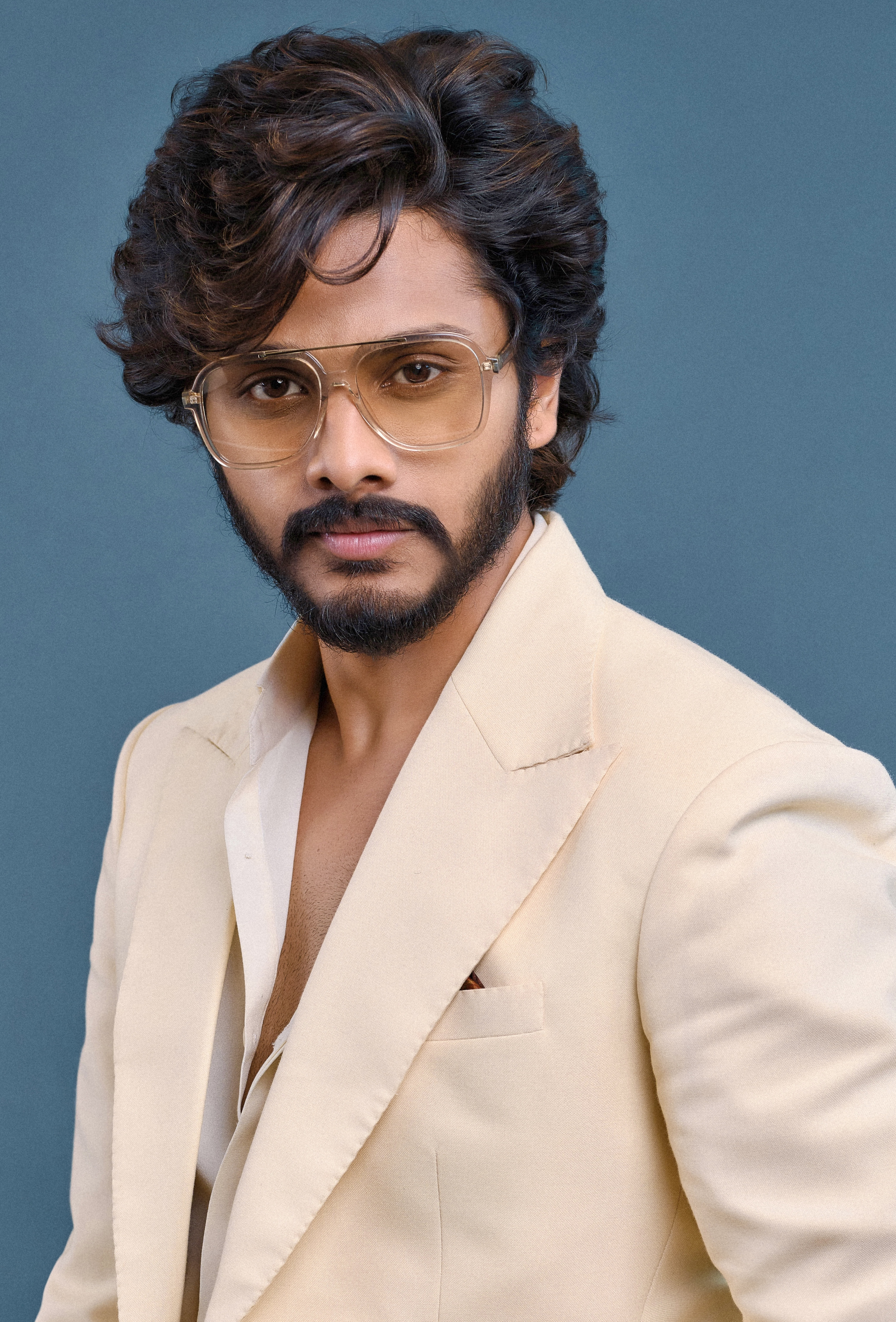
- The 2024 recipient: Teja Sajja
- Awarded for: Best performance by an actor in Telugu films
- Country: India
- Presented by: Filmfare
- First award: 2015
- Currently held by: Teja Sajja for Hanu-Man (2024)

The Filmfare Critics Award for Best Actor – Telugu is given by Filmfare as part of its annual Filmfare Awards South for Telugu films. The award is given by a chosen jury of critics.

== Winners ==
Year	Actors	Role	Film	Ref.
2015	Nani	Lakkaraju	Bhale Bhale Magadivoy	
2016	Allu Arjun	Gana	Sarrainodu	
2017	Venkatesh	Aditya Rao	Guru	
2018	Dulquer Salmaan	Gemini Ganesan	Mahanati	
2019	AWARDS FUNCTION WAS SUSPENDED DUE TO COVID-19 PANDEMIC			
2020 / 21	Nani	Shyam Singha Roy/Vasudev Ghanta	Shyam Singha Roy	
2022	Dulquer Salmaan	Ram	Sita Ramam	
2023	Naveen Polishetty	Siddhu Polishetty	Miss Shetty Mr Polishetty	
2023	Prakash Raj	Raghava Rao	Ranga Maarthaanda	
2024	Teja Sajja	Hanumanthu	Hanu-Man	

== Superlatives ==
Superlative	Actress	Record
Most awards	Dulquer Salmaan	2 wins
Most awards	Nani	2 wins

== See also ==
- Filmfare Critics Award for Best Actress – Telugu
