= Maniyarayile Ashokan =

2020 Malayalam romantic comedy film

- Poster
- Directed by: Shamzu Zayba
- Screenplay by: Vineeth Krishnan
- Story by: Magesh Boji
- Produced by: Dulquer Salmaan; Jacob Gregory
- Starring: Jacob Gregory; Anupama Parameswaran
- Cinematography: Sajad Kakku
- Edited by: Appu N. Bhattathiri
- Music by: Sreehari K. Nair
- Production company: Wayfarer Films
- Distributed by: Netflix
- Release date: 31 August 2020
- Country: India
- Language: Malayalam

Maniyarayile Ashokan is a 2020 Indian Malayalam-language romantic comedy film directed by Shamzu Zayba. The film stars Jacob Gregory and Anupama Parameswaran. The cast also includes Krishna Sankar and Shine Tom Chacko. The film was produced by Gregory and Dulquer Salmaan in his newly established production company Wayfarer Films. He made a cameo appearance along with Nazriya Nazim and Anu Sithara as other characters.

Due to the COVID-19 pandemic, the film was directly released through Netflix on 31 August 2020. The film received mixed reviews from critics.

== Plot ==
Set in a fictional village, the story starts by introducing two characters: Unnimaya and Ashokan. Unnimaya is described as the most beautiful woman in that village, whom every men to woo. However, she eloped with a postman named Padmanabhan. On the other hand, Ashokan is an ordinary young man who has misfortunes in his marriage proposals. During Ashokan's wedding night, the newlywed wife asks him whether this is his second marriage. Ashokan then recalls his earlier dreams of getting married.

As Ashokan is a single man past "the marital age", he is always questioned by the villagers and his relatives, including his cousin, Ajayan, who never misses a chance to tease him. Apart from his loving parents, Ashokan is supported by his friends, Ratheesh and Shaiju, who stand by him through thick and thin. Ashokan's father and Narayanan bring the marital proposal for Ashokan to Narayanan's daughter - Anju. Anju rejects the proposal saying that Ashokan isn't fair-skinned or tall enough.

Later, Ashokan learns of Shyama's love for him. Despite convincing Shyama's family into marriage, the wedding is called off as Ashokan's horoscope predicts the death of his first wife. Ashokan is heartbroken. Meanwhile, Ratheesh falls in love with Rani teacher, and they get married.

Ashokan consults an astrologer and seeks solutions for the problems in his horoscope. The astrologer asks him to marry a plantain so that no human will get hurt. Ashokan finds a plantain of his choice and marries it. He considers the plantain a human wife and talks to it regularly. Later, the plantain falls off and Ashokan is heartbroken. But it is then revealed that two corms from the plantain are planted again and Ashokan considers these two plantains his kids.

A new marriage proposal comes but Ashokan is reluctant to agree because he is already married. His friends make him understand the reality in vain. Ratheesh brings him into a mental health facility and after talking to his cousin, Arjun, he grasps the reality. He then agrees to the marriage proposal and marries Indu. On the wedding night, he replies to his wife that this is his first marriage.

== Cast ==
- Jacob Gregory as Ashokan
- Anupama Parameswaran as Shyama, love interest of Ashokan
- Krishna Sankar as Ratheesh, friend of Ashokan
- Shine Tom Chacko as Shaiju, friend of Ashokan
- Sudheesh as Alex
- Sreelakshmi as Lakshmi, mother of Ashokan.
- Vijayaraghavan as Achuthan, father of Ashokan.
- Indrans as Priest
- Kunchan as Narayanan
- Nayana Elza as Rani Teacher, Ratheesh's wife
- Santhosh Keezhattoor as Shyama's father
- Anjali Aneesh as Psychiatrist
- Ranjitha Menon as Asha, wife of Shaiju
- Al Sabith as Shyama's brother

Cameo appearances

- Dulquer Salmaan as Arjun
- Nazriya Nazim as Indhu, Ashokan's Wife
- Anu Sithara as Unnimaya
- Sunny Wayne as Ajayan
- Shritha Sivadas as Anju
- Ranjini T.H. as Kunju
- Onima Kashyap as Olu

== Production ==
It was reported that Dulquer Salmaan will make his debut in film production, for his upcoming project directed by Shamzu Zayba. Anupama Parameswaran announced her return to Malayalam cinema after a hiatus of five years since Premam (2015), and she further revealed that she would work as an assistant director for this film apart from doing one of the lead roles. After registering his production company titled Wayfarer Films, Dulquer announced the project as their maiden production which was titled Maniyariyile Ashokan. Comedian-turned-director Ramesh Pisharody was the one who suggested the title for the film. Although Maniyarayile Ashokan was announced as the first production, Wayfarer released Varane Avashyamund to theatres first.

== Soundtrack ==
Maniyariyile Ashokan

Soundtrack album by Sreehari K. Nair
- Released: 31 July 2020
- Recorded: 2020
- Genre: Feature film soundtrack
- Length: 21:44
- Language: Malayalam
- Label: Wayfarer Films
- Producer: Sreehari K. Nair

The soundtrack album was composed by Sreehari K. Nair, with lyrics by B. K. Harinarayanan, Muzammil Kunnumal, Shamzu Zayba, Ajeesh Dasan, Amir Pallikal, and Shihas Ahmedkoya. The song "Unnimaya" was sung by Dulquer Salmaan and Jacob Gregory. The soundtrack album was released on 31 July 2020.

No.	Title	Lyrics	Singer(s)	Length
1.	"Peyyum Nilaavu"	B. K. Hari Narayanan	K. S. Harisankar	3:46
2.	"Engo Ninnu"	Muzammil Kunnumal	Suchith Suresan	4:31
3.	"Olu"	Shamzu Zayba	Sid Sriram	3:43
4.	"Thornidathe"	Ajeesh Dasan	Sreehari K. Nair	3:42
5.	"Vidacholi"	Amir Pallikal	Sreehari K. Nair	3:57
6.	"Unnimaya"	Shihas Ammedkoya	Dulquer Salmaan, Jacob Gregory	2:01

== Release ==
Maniyarayile Ashokan was scheduled for release on 10 April 2020 but was postponed due to the COVID-19 pandemic. The film was made available on the streaming platform Netflix on 31 August 2020, coinciding with the Onam festival.

== Reception ==
The Times of India gave the film 3.5 out of 5 stars and stated "Maniyarayile Ashokan is a slice-of-life story with a genuine dose of humour." Writing for the Hindustan Times, Haricharan Pudipeddi stated "The film, which revolves around Ashokan (Jacob Gregory) and his attempts to get married, is lighthearted and fun to watch despite its slightly predictable ending." The News Minute gave 3 out of 5 and stated "The typicality of Ashokan's life, however, fades in the latter part of the film. It starts with some strange advice from a priest but goes on to affect the man all too much. Gregory easily adapts to this new character that emerges from the village guy with the government job. As with the rest of the movie, director Shamzu doesn't let this unusual part stick too much and the movie ends as sweetly as the description of the village it began with."

Sify gave 2 out of 5 and stated "Maniyarayile Ashokan is a below average comedy-drama which fails to impress." The Indian Express gave 1 out of 5 stars and stated "Shamzu Zayba did not clearly think through the idea. The half baked plot results in the wannabe slice-of-life movie." Anna M. M. Verticad of Firstpost gave the same and stated "The confirmation of Dulquer's hotness in a cameo that he spends mostly attired in a Navy outfit is the only worthwhile takeaway from Shamzu Zayba's Maniyarayile Ashokan." Baradwaj Rangan of Film Companion wrote "In trying to make the proceedings “entertaining”, the film cheats its protagonist, who remains a flat line from start to finish." A review from The Hindu stated "The Malayalam film manages to make us empathise with the protagonist's plight, but one cannot miss the fact that it does become absurd and unbelievable beyond a point."
