= Filmfare Critics Award for Best Actor – Malayalam =

Indian annual film award

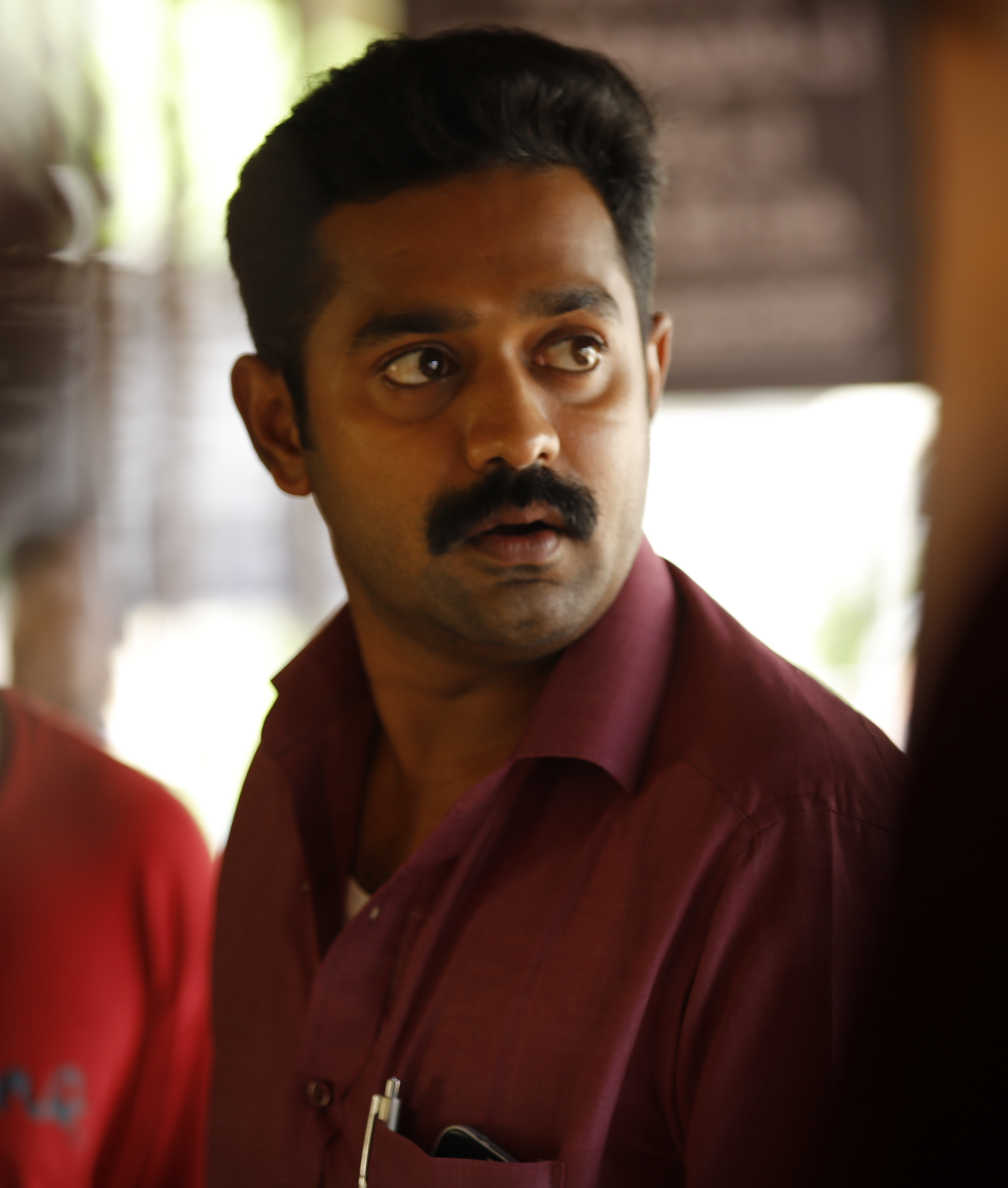
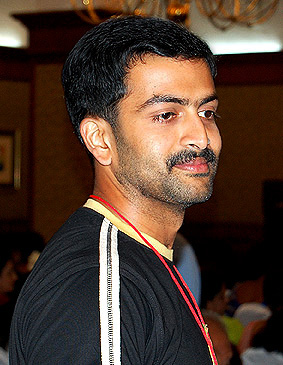
- The 2024 recipients: Asif Ali and Prithviraj Sukumaran
- Awarded for: Best performance by an actor in Malayalam films
- Country: India
- Presented by: Filmfare
- First award: 2013
- Currently held by: Asif Ali for Kishkindha Kaandam and Prithviraj Sukumaran for Aadu Jeevitham (2024)

The Filmfare Critics Award for Best Actor – Malayalam is given by Filmfare as part of its annual Filmfare Awards South for Malayalam films. The award is given by a chosen jury of critics.

== Winners ==
Year	Actor	Role	Film	Ref.
2013	Prithviraj Sukumaran	J. C. Daniel / Harris Daniel	Celluloid	
2014	Nivin Pauly	Rameshan	1983	
2015	Jayasurya	Sudhi Vathmeekam	Su Su Sudhi Vathmeekam	
2016	Dulquer Salmaan	Siddharth	Kali	
2016	Dulquer Salmaan	Krishnan	Kammatipaadam	
2017	Tovino Thomas	John Mathew	Mayaanadhi	
2018	Soubin Shahir	Majeed	Sudani from Nigeria	
2019	AWARDS FUNCTION WAS SUSPENDED DUE TO COVID-19 PANDEMIC			
2020–2021	Jayasurya	Murali Nambiar / Vellam Murali	Vellam	
2022	Alencier Ley Lopez	Ittychan	Appan	
2023	Joju George	Pramod Kumar and Vinod Kumar	Iratta	
2024	Asif Ali	Ajay Chandran	Kishkindha Kaandam	
2024	Prithviraj Sukumaran	Mohammed Najeeb	Aadujeevitham	

== Superlatives ==
Superlative	Actor	Record
Most wins	Jayasurya	2
Most wins	Prithviraj Sukumaran	2

== See also ==
- Filmfare Critics Award for Best Actress – Malayalam
