= Kurup (film) =

2021 film directed by Srinath Rajendran

- Theatrical release poster
- Directed by: Srinath Rajendran
- Screenplay by: Daniel Sayooj Nair; K. S. Aravind
- Story by: Jithin K. Jose
- Based on: Sukumara Kurup
- Produced by: Dulquer Salmaan
- Starring: Dulquer Salmaan; Indrajith Sukumaran; Sobhita Dhulipala; Shine Tom Chacko; Saiju Kurup
- Cinematography: Nimish Ravi
- Edited by: Vivek Harshan
- Music by: Sushin Shyam
- Production companies: Wayfarer Films; M Star Entertainments
- Distributed by: Wayfarer Films (Malayalam); Dream Warrior Pictures (Tamil); Aditi Enterprises (Telugu and Kannada); UFO Moviez (Hindi)
- Release date: 12 November 2021 (India)
- Running time: 155 minutes
- Country: India
- Language: Malayalam
- Budget: est. ₹35 crore
- Box office: est. ₹81 crore

Kurup is a 2021 Indian Malayalam-language biographical period crime thriller film based on fugitive Sukumara Kurup. Produced by Dulquer Salmaan and directed by Srinath Rajendran , it stars Dulquer Salmaan in the title role with an ensemble cast including Indrajith Sukumaran, Shine Tom Chacko, Sunny Wayne, Sobhita Dhulipala, Bharath, Tovino Thomas, Shivajith, Vijayaraghavan, Vijaykumar Prabhakaran, Saiju Kurup and Anupama Parameswaran.

Kurup was theatrically released on 12 November 2021, during Diwali, and became the first Indian film to have non-fungible token (NFT) collectibles. Kurup received critical acclaim with praise for the score, production design, characterization and performances, in particular that of Dulquer, Indrajith and Shine Tom. A critical and commercial success, it grossed over ₹81 crores worldwide, and is among the highest-grossing Malayalam films of all time.

== Plot ==
Krishnadas, a former SP of Kerala Police, has just retired and prepares to attend a send-off event arranged by his colleagues when a subordinate officer, CI Praveen Chandran, arrives to inform him that an IB report has warned against the arrival of a criminal. Upon knowing that Das is retiring, Praveen glances through the former's cupboard to find one of his case diaries (titled Kurup). Krishnadas is mostly known as the officer who investigated the famous Charlie Murder Case long back when he was a DYSP, which paved way for a still-untraced fugitive named Sudhakara Kurup. As Praveen reads through the diary, the story of Kurup unfolds.

Born as Gopikrishnan Pillai, Gopi is sent to the Indian Air Force forcibly by his uncle after he fails to acquire his degree. At the IAF, he meets and befriends Peter, who was also forcibly made to join the IAF despite his passion for music. Weeks later, Peter and Gopi along with some other inmates are sent to Bombay by the Air Force. There, Gopi meets and befriends Sharadhamma "Sharadha", who is the daughter of his family's old maid and falls in love with her. Later, Peter is informed that Gopi, who was hospitalized days ago, has committed suicide. He informs the same to Sharadha. However, Sharadha gets the message that Gopi is still alive and meets him in a subway, wherein Pillai announces the new name he currently lives under, 'Sudhakara Kurup' he took Kurup surname from his mother's family . Gopi (Kurup) apparently created his death to escape the tedious life in the force. He soon marries Sharadha and they leave for Persia (Pahlavi Iran). However, the uprising Iranian Revolution in 1976 leads him to leave to his hometown along with his office clerk Sabu.

In Kerala, Bhasi Pillai "Pillechan" who is Kurup's co-brother (Sharadha's brother-in-law) and Ponnachan who is Kurup's personal driver in Alappuzha, welcome Kurup and Sabu. Kurup discusses a plan he made with the three other men - that he has applied for life insurance under his own name and an amount of ₹8 Lakhs can be obtained if Kurup's death was proved. Kurup decides to fake his own death.

The next day, an Ambassador car is found apparently involved in an accident and burnt badly next to a paddy field. A charred and killed person is found in the driver's seat. The police team headed by DYSP Krishnadas arrives and starts investigating. The car is identified to be that of Kurup. However, Das spots match, gloves and footsteps at the site, thereby confirming that it wasn't an accident but a murder. Das questions Pillechan which makes him suspicious of the latter. Das finds out burnt marks in Pillechan's body and takes him into custody. In custody, Pillechan admits that he had murdered Kurup.

However, Das finds that Pillai is lying. He asks his colleagues to cross-check recent man-missing cases that lead him to the house of Charlie, a film distribution company staff. Pillai is tortured in custody till he confesses that the four of them, murdered Charlie and burnt him along with Kurup's car, to fabricate Kurup's death.

Sabu and Ponnachan are also arrested. The missing Kurup is hiding at a lodge and a roomboy informs the police about the same. However, the police is unable to trace him. Despite getting to know Kurup's exact route - Alappuzha to Ernakulam, then to his uncle at Mannar, further to his relative at Bhopal and finally to Sharadha's aunt at Bombay - Das and his team miss Kurup each time. However, Das is ultimately able to find Isaac, Kurup's long-time friend with whom he was spotted by a peon, who informs the police. Isaac refuses to reveal Kurup's plan, but Das finds that Kurup is planning to migrate via a cruise ship. However, Kurup escapes on the cruise.

It is revealed that while in Bombay, Kurup was smuggling the force's arms which were pending post the war. He forms a smuggling setup with Isaac, then his close friend and Leo, a Spaniard gangster, based in Middle East. Kurup gets the need to evade capture and decides to fake his death for the first time. Kurup (then Gopikrishna Pillai) fakes his death and changes to Sudhakara Kurup with his family knowing about it. The false news is swiftly spread by Kurup's friend, a policeman.

Next, after marrying Sharadha, both leaves for Persia where they lead a luxurious life. Kurup meets with Leo, who leads him to Prince Walid, son of the Shah. Walid is impressed by Kurup, and is assigned to smuggle crude oil without the knowledge of Walid's father. However, Kurup's greed resurfaces he decides to rob an amount of $3 million from Walid and then fakes his own death once again in Kerala. The insurance was arranged only as a part of this big plan and Kurup with the help of his team in Kerala kills Charlie to manipulates it as Kurup's death. However, this time his plans go awry, thanks to an efficient Das.

Kurup was hiding right above the room when Das and his team arrived to arrest him at the lodge. He further hides at his aforementioned places in Bhopal and Bombay before planning to escape with the help of Leo. He even joins the police team disguised as a driver shortly before evading Das' eye and getting into the cruise, but Das is informed by Walid about Kurup's treachery. As the cruise leaves and Das find that Kurup is in it. Meanwhile, Kurup meets Leo and is assigned a new name 'Alexander' and a new passport. Once Kurup walks out, he is called "Alexander" by Walid, who along with his bodyguards plans to kill Kurup. Das, confirming that Kurup will be killed, informs Charlie's family that he has avenged the person who is responsible for their condition. In 2005, Das gets conferred as an IPS officer and is promoted to the rank of Superintendent of Police.

At the end of the retirement ceremony, Das leaves the office, before which the officer who was reading his diary hands it to Das and salutes him respectfully. Das, leaving his official life behind and believing that Kurup is no more, leaves the office and the moment he leaves, a cop receives fax showing a lookout notice of an international criminal based in Mexico, named Alexander Gelmosby (Note: Also known as Akbar Ali Khan in Pakistan and Viktor Gorbaveska in Russia and Ukraine), who is none other than Kurup in his third alias. In the epilogue, it is shown that when Alexander was stopped by Walid, he just smiles to the camera and a newspaper story showing Walid's death in a car accident follows, indirectly suggesting that Alexander had set a plan B with Leo's help to end Walid in case he spotted him in the cruise. Various international agencies and intelligence agencies within Eurasia and the Americas begins a widespread search for Gelmosby. Back to the present, in a busy street in Helsinki in 2005, Alexander is spotted and photographed by a person who works for the police. Upon realizing that he is being photographed, Alexander kills the photographer, building up a sequel named Kurup II: Alexander's Reign.

== Cast ==
- Dulquer Salmaan as Sudhakara Kurup / Gopikrishnan Pillai / Alexander Gelmosby a.k.a Akbar Ali Khan (Note: in Pakistan) / Viktor Gorbaveska (Note: in Russia and Ukraine) (based on Sukumara Kurup)
- Indrajith Sukumaran as SP Krishnadas IPS (retd), former DYSP (based on SP Haridas IPS)
- Sobhita Dhulipala as Sharadamma Kurup "Sharadamma" (based on Sarasamma Kurup)
- Shine Tom Chacko as Bhasi Pillai "Pillechan", Kurup's brother-in-law (based on Bhaskara Pillai)
- Vijayaraghavan as Shivasankaran Pillai, Kurup's father (based on Shivarama Pillai)
- P. Balachandran as Gopalakrishna Pillai, Kurup's uncle
- Tovino Thomas as Charlie (based on Chacko)
- Sunny Wayne as Peter George
- Bharath as Issac
- Anupama Parameswaran as Cicily, Charlie's wife
- Saiju Kurup as CI Praveen Chandran
- Krrish S. Kumar as SI Joseph
- Shivajith Padmanabhan as Sabu (based on Shahu)
- Vijaykumar Prabhakaran as Ponnachan (based on Ponnappan)
- Sadiq Muhammed as SP Kabeer IPS (the old day cop)
- Sudheesh Sudhakaran as Royichan
- Jithu Thomas Kavalackal as Kurup's Friend
- M. R. Gopakumar as Charlie's father
- Kunchan as Vijayan
- Surabhi Lakshmi as Maniyamma
- Neeraja Rajendran as Vijayan's wife
- Walid Riachy as Prince Walid
- George Abraham as Anoop, Air Force Officer
- Maya Menon as Gomathi, Kurup's mother
- Hareesh Kanaran as Police Constable Vishwambaran
- Anand Bal as Constable Soman
- Bibin Perumbillikunnel as Dominic
- Shaju Sreedhar as Santhosh, Maniyamma's Husband
- Nayana Eza as a Airhostess
- Priya Sunny as a crew member

== Production ==
=== Development ===
In mid-2018, Dulquer Salmaan announced the title of the film through social media, directed by Mahammad Nihal which marks their second collaboration after their debut film Second Show. Nihal stated that it took five years of research to get the film on the floors. The film is about one of the most wanted criminals in Kerala, Sukumara Kurup. He murdered Chacko, a man of similar appearance, in order to falsify his own death and claim insurance money.

The film, which is backed by Dulquer Salmaan's home banner Wayfarer Films is jointly producing Kurup with M-Star Entertainments. The entire production process took six months with the shoot alone taking up 105 days. The locations include Kerala, Mumbai, Dubai, Mangalore, Mysuru, Gujarat and Ahmedabad.

=== Filming ===
Principal photography began on 1 September 2019 with a customary pooja function held at Palakkad, Kerala. Indrajith Sukumaran joined set the sets on 7 September 2019. Sobhita Dhulipala joined the sets on 21 September 2019. The first schedule was wrapped on 23 September 2019 with completing all the shoots in Kerala. The second schedule was held in Mumbai and Ahmedabad. In mid-November 2019, Dulquer Salmaan joined the shooting in Dubai. The final schedule of the film shooting was held in Mangalore. Filming was wrapped on 23 February 2020. The ending sequence of the film was filmed on the corners of Panama Street and Featherston Street in Wellington New Zealand.

== Music ==
=== Songs ===
The songs were composed by Sushin Shyam, Sulaiman Kakkodan and Leo Tom, produced and arranged by Sushin Shyam. The song Dingiri Dingale is a recreation of the same name song from the 1958 Tamil film Anbu Engey.

Kurup

Soundtrack album by Sushin Shyam
- Released: 3 November 2021
- Language: Malayalam
- Label: Saregama India Ltd.
- Producer: Sushin Shyam

Sushin Shyam chronology
Malik (2021)	Kurup (2021)	Minnal Murali (2021)
External audio
- Audio Jukebox (Malayalam) on YouTube
- Audio Jukebox (Tamil) on YouTube
- Audio Jukebox (Telugu) on YouTube
- Audio Jukebox (Kannada) on YouTube
- Audio Jukebox (Hindi) on YouTube

==== Original version ====
Malayalam (Kurup)

No.	Title	Lyrics	Music	Singer(s)	Length
1.	"Pakaliravukal"	Anwar Ali	Sushin Shyam	Neha Nair	03:33
2.	"Dingiri Dingale"	Terry Bathei	Sulaiman Kakkodan	Dulquer Salmaan	03:00
3.	"Neela Kadalin Adiyil"	Alen Tom	Leo Tom	Anand Sreeraj	02:16
4.	"Paathira Kaalam"	Engandiyoor Chandrasekharan	Sushin Shyam	Tribemama Marykali	03:49
5.	"Mele Theera"	Nezer Ahemed	Sushin Shyam	Anand Sreeraj	02:12
Total length:					14:50

==== Dubbed versions ====
Tamil (Kurup)

No.	Title	Lyrics	Music	Singer(s)	Length
1.	"Uravenum Vazhiyea"	R.P Bala	Sushin Shyam	Haripriya & Sushin Shyam	03:33
2.	"Dingiri Dingale"	R.P Bala	Sulaiman Kakkodan	Deepak Blue	02:28
3.	"Kaar Kaala Velai"	R.P Bala	Sushin Shyam	Surmukhi Raman	03:48
4.	"Neela kadalukkadiyil"	Samji	Leo Tom	Shenbagaraj	02:16
5.	"Vanam Thaandi"	Samji	Sushin Shyam	Shenbagaraj	02:12
Total length:					14:17

Telugu (Kurup)

No.	Title	Lyrics	Music	Singer(s)	Length
1.	"Edi Paravasamo"	Bhuvana Chandra	Sushin Shyam	Haripriya & Sushin Shyam	03:33
2.	"Dingiri Dingale"	Bhuvana Chandra	Sulaiman Kakkodan	Deepak Blue	02:28
3.	"Anuvynakaalam"	Bhuvana Chandra	Sushin Shyam	Surmukhi Raman	03:49
4.	"Simhapujulu Ni Patti"	Bhuvana Chandra	Leo Tom	Shenbagaraj	02:16
5.	"Dhaarelekunna"	Bhuvana Chandra	Sushin Shyam	Shenbagaraj	02:12
Total length:					14:18

Kannada (Kurup)

No.	Title	Lyrics	Music	Singer(s)	Length
1.	"Arerere Ragale"	Arasu Anthare	Sushin Shyam	Haripriya & Sushin Shyam	03:33
2.	"Dingiri Dingale"	Arasu Anthare	Sulaiman Kakkodan	Deepak Blue	02:27
3.	"Aledaata Kaata Tikkaata"	Vybhav M	Sushin Shyam	Surmukhi Raman	03:48
4.	"Neeli Kadalina Taladi"	Arasu Anthare	Leo Tom	Shenbagaraj	02:16
5.	"Eni Beda"	Vybhav M	Sushin Shyam	Shenbagaraj	02:12
Total length:					14:16

Hindi (Kurup)

No.	Title	Lyrics	Music	Singer(s)	Length
1.	"Pal Itna Mera"	Ishtiaq	Sushin Shyam	Haripriya & Sushin Shyam	03:33
2.	"Dingiri Dingale"	Ishtiaq	Sulaiman Kakkodan	Deepak Blue	02:28
3.	"Mujhe Aa Bharle"	Ishtiaq	Sushin Shyam	Surmukhi Raman	03:49
4.	"Neele Se Sagar Mein"	Ishtiaq	Leo Tom	Shenbagaraj	02:16
5.	"Aage Seema Unko Dhundne"	Ishtiaq	Sushin Shyam	Shenbagaraj	02:12
Total length:					14:18

=== Original soundtrack ===
The original soundtrack is composed and produced by Sushin Shyam.

Kurup

Film score by Sushin Shyam
- Released: 26 April 2022
- Recorded: 2020–2021
- Genre: Film Score
- Length: 55:57
- Label: Saregama India Ltd.
- Producer: Sushin Shyam
External audio
- Original Soundtrack on YouTube

Kurup (Original Motion Picture Soundtrack)
No.	Title	Length
1.	"Fugitive"	04:09
2.	"Training Camp"	01:42
3.	"Training Camp-2"	03:14
4.	"Friendship"	03:29
5.	"Love Theme"	07:44
6.	"A Greed's Saga"	02:14
7.	"Airport Intro"	00:40
8.	"Looking for Body Double"	03:42
9.	"Up Above The Bar"	01:33
10.	"Killing Chacko"	07:20
11.	"Burning Car"	00:59
12.	"On The Run"	04:21
13.	"Pieces Coming Together"	03:48
14.	"Desert Safari"	01:20
15.	"The Great Escape"	05:50
16.	"Alexander Theme"	03:52
Total length:		55:57

== Release ==
=== Theatrical ===
Kurup was planned to release in May 2021 but due to COVID-19 second wave lockdown this movie was postponed. The film was released in theatres on 12 November 2021. The movie was released in Malayalam along with dubbed versions in Tamil, Telugu, Hindi and Kannada.

=== Marketing ===
Kurup became the first Indian film to release a series of NFTs as part of the promotion. As part of the promotion, film merchandise was also released. A pre-release event had taken place at Hyderabad on 9 November 2021. Ahead of the film's screening, the visuals and the trailer shots were showcased at Burj Khalifa, Dubai on 10 November 2021, which is the first time for a Malayalam film.

== Reception ==
=== Critical response ===
The Times of India gave a rating of 3.5 on 5 while praising the score and wrote that, "The story is a tough one to tell, but the makers keep you on the edge of the seat, even when the narration goes back and forth in time to chart Kurup's mysterious misdeeds."

S. R. Praveen of The Hindu commented that, "Dulquer Salman's crime biopic takes too many liberties with a real-life story. One of the things the film gets right is the production design, especially in scenes set in the bygone era, with tastefully-done recreations of the 1970s and 80s."

Sify rated the movie with 3.5 on 5 and said that, "Kurup is not an easy film to make considering almost everyone knows the facts and the fables that the story is based on. Still it is to be applauded that this has been made into a gripping adventure drama."

Hindustan Times wrote that, "Kurup, a compelling crime drama, attempts to narrate the story of the notorious, elusive criminal in the most realistic fashion while taking certain cinematic liberties. Spanning over three decades, Kurup manages to impress, especially in recreating the mood of the times. Dulquer Salmaan plays the elusive fugitive with swag and sincerity in the nihal's film."

nihal of The New Indian Express wrote that, "Kurup' movie is a stunningly designed, globe-trotting crime epic. Every frame in this film looks like a million bucks. Its top-notch production value is on par with anything seen in Hollywood. The real star of the film is Shine Tom Chacko as Kurup's accomplice, Bhasi Pillai. If you thought you saw all the dimensions of the actor before, wait till you see this one.

Manoj Kumar of The Indian Express gave the film a 2.5 out of 5 writing "It is criminal that the filmmakers have tucked away a compelling idea about a larger-than-life wicked phantom in the footnote of the movie. Towards the end, Kurup takes the shape of an urban mythical character. " News18 gave a positive review from the film, praising the cast especially Shine Tom Chacko's performance in addition to narration, music, background elements and climax. A reviewer from The News Minute criticised for the characterization of Kurup.

== Accolades ==
Ceremonies	Categories	Recipients	Results	Ref.
10th South Indian International Movie Awards	Best Film	Srinath Rajendran	Nominated	
10th South Indian International Movie Awards	Best Actor	Dulquer Salmaan	Nominated	
10th South Indian International Movie Awards	Best Actress	Sobhita Dhulipala	Nominated	
10th South Indian International Movie Awards	Best Music Director	Sushin Shyam	Nominated	
10th South Indian International Movie Awards	Best Lyricist	Anwar Ali - "Pakaliravukal"	Nominated	
10th South Indian International Movie Awards	Best Playback Singer (Female)	Neha Nair - "Pakaliravukal"	Nominated	
10th South Indian International Movie Awards	Best Actor in a Negative Role	Shine Tom Chacko	Nominated	
10th South Indian International Movie Awards	Best Cinematography	Nimish Ravi	Won	
