= Dulquer Salmaan =

Indian actor, playback singer and producer (born 1983)

- Dulquer in 2019
- Born: 28 July 1983 (age 43); Kochi, Kerala, India
- Education: Purdue University
- Occupations: Actor; singer; producer; distributor
- Years active: 2012–present
- Organization: Wayfarer Films
- Works: Full list
- Spouse: Amal Sufiya (m. 2011)
- Children: 1
- Father: Mammootty
- Family: Mammootty family
- Awards: Full list
- Website: dulquer.com

Dulquer Salmaan (IPA: [d̪ulkʰɐr salmaːn]; born 28 July 1983) is an Indian actor and producer who primarily works in Malayalam and Telugu films, alongside a few Tamil, and Hindi films. One of the highest paid Malayalam actors, Salmaan is a recipient of several awards including five Filmfare Awards South, one Kerala State Film Award, one Kerala Film Critics Association Award and one Telangana Gaddar Film Award.

Born to actor Mammootty, Salmaan graduated with a bachelor's degree in business management from Purdue University and worked as a business manager in Dubai before pursuing a career in acting. After a three-month acting course at the Barry John acting Studio, Salmaan made his acting debut with Second Show (2012) and received the Filmfare Award for Best Male Debut – South for his performance in Ustad Hotel (2012).

Following his performance in ABCD (2013), Neelakasham Pachakadal Chuvanna Bhoomi (2013), and Vaayai Moodi Pesavum (2014), Salmaan achieved his career breakthrough with Bangalore Days (2014). He established himself as a leading Malayalam actor with Vikramadithyan (2014), Charlie (2015), which earned him Kerala State Film Award for Best Actor, Kali (2016), Kammatti Paadam (2016), Jomonte Suvisheshangal (2017) and Kurup (2021). Salmaan expanded to Tamil films with the box-office successes O Kadhal Kanmani (2015) and Kannum Kannum Kollaiyadithaal (2020). His highest-grossing releases came with the Telugu films Mahanati (2018), Sita Ramam (2022) and Lucky Baskhar (2024). For Mahanati and Sita Ramam, he won the Filmfare Critics Award for Best Actor – Telugu.

Alongside his acting career, Salmaan is a producer, singer and philanthropist. He is married to architect Amal Sufiya with whom he has a daughter.

== Early life and background ==
Salmaan was born on 28 July 1983 in Kochi, to actor Mammootty and his wife Sulfath Kuttyy. He has an elder sister, Surumi. Salmaan completed his primary level education at Toc-H Public School, Vyttila, Kochi and his secondary level education at Sishya School in Chennai. He earned Bachelor of Science degree in Management from Krannert School of Management at Purdue University in 2008 and worked at an IT firm in Dubai. Later, he decided to pursue a career in acting and attended a three-month acting course at the Barry John Acting Studio in Mumbai.

== Career ==
=== Early work (2012–2013) ===
Salmaan marked his screen debut in 2012 with debutante Srinath Rajendran's Malayalam crime film Second Show, in which he played the role of Harilal, a gangster. When asked in an interview about his "unconventional entry with a bunch of newcomers", Salmaan stated that it was his conscious decision as he felt that " ... when an actor debuts, he has to earn the right to be a hero and not get it through a shortcut route." The film was a commercial success.

Salmaan next release that year was Anwar Rasheed's Malayalam film Ustad Hotel opposite Nithya Menen. The film, which received the National Film Award for Best Popular Film Providing Wholesome Entertainment, was also a major commercial success at the box office. He received praises for his portrayal of Faizy a budding chef, and a critic of Sify noted, "Dulquer continues his fine form following his impressive debut in Second Show". For his performance, Salmaan won the Filmfare Award for Best Male Debut – Malayalam, in addition to his first nomination for the Filmfare Award for Best Actor – Malayalam. His last film of the year was Theevram, a Malayalam film directed by Roopesh Peethambaran. The film was a box office failure.

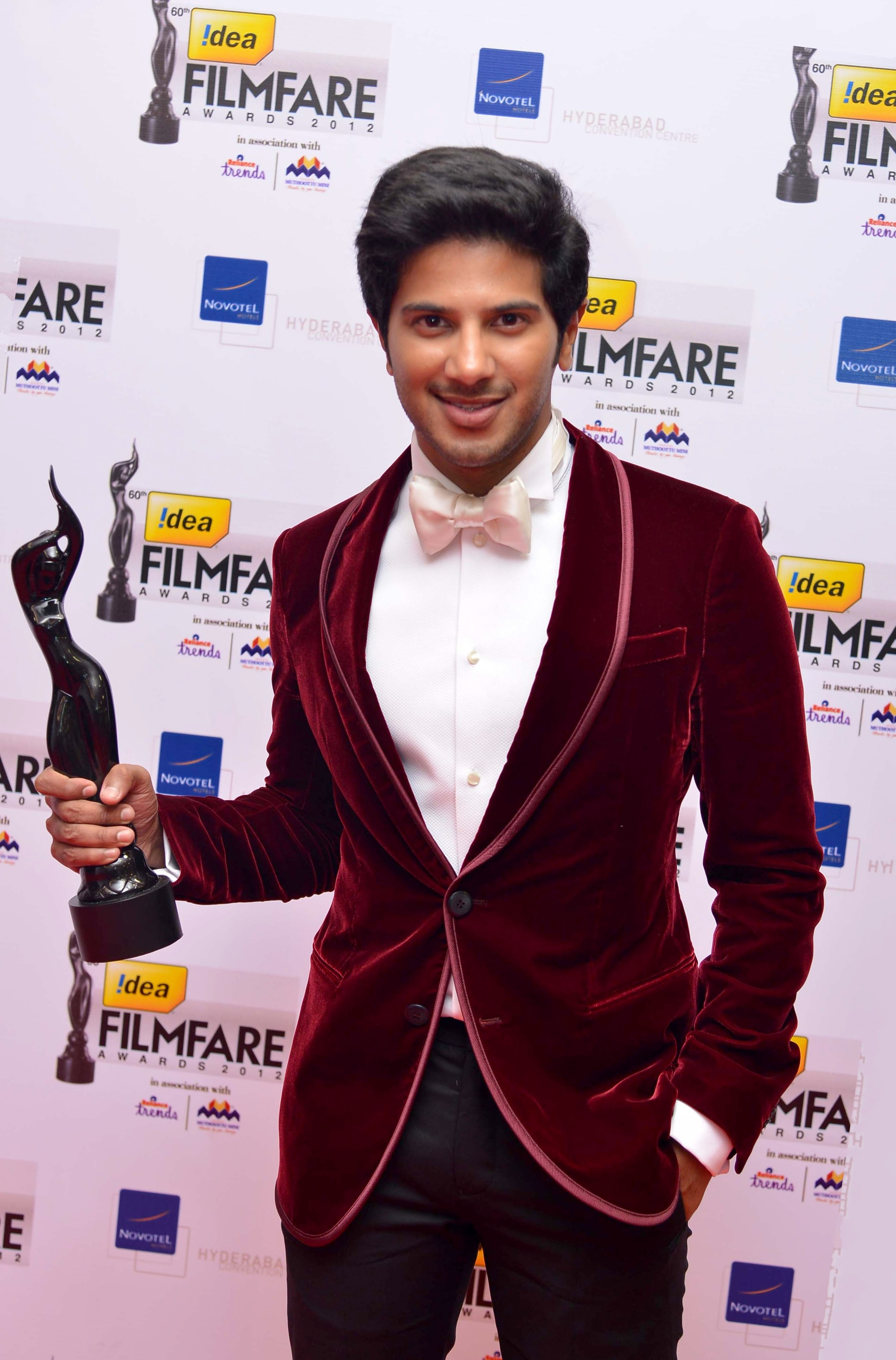
Salmaan at the 60th Filmfare Awards South in 2013, where he won the Filmfare Award for Best Male Debut – South

In 2013, Salmaan first appeared in Martin Prakkat's Malayalam film ABCD: American-Born Confused Desi opposite Aparna Gopinath, in which he made his singing debut with "Johnny Mone Johnny". Though the film received mixed reviews, his performance was well received by critics. Sify stated: "It is Dulquer Salmaan's show all the way and in all fairness the young actor has given his heart and soul into his character." The film was a box office success. He was also part of Amal Neerad's segment Kullante Bharya in the anthology film 5 Sundarikal (2013). Salmaan then collaborated with Sameer Thahir in the Malayalam film Neelakasham Pachakadal Chuvanna Bhoomi, which was a road film. His last release of the year was Alagappan's Malayalam film Pattam Pole, which was a commercial failure. He played a Tamil Hindu who falls in love with a Christian girl opposite Malavika Mohanan.

=== Established actor (2014–2016) ===
Salmaan had five releases in 2014, a crucial year in his career. He first appeared in the Malayalam film Salalah Mobiles opposite Nazriya Nazim. A commercial failure, it could not garner much success for the actor. His next appearance was in the Tamil-Malayalam bilingual Vaayai Moodi Pesavum, where he reunited with Nazriya Nazim. While the Malayalam version Samsaaram Aarogyathinu Haanikaram was received poorly, the Tamil version received positive reviews and became a sleeper hit. IANS stated that Salmaan is "a treat to watch" and added, "he earns extra brownie points for dubbing in his own voice and speaking flawless Tamil." He won the Filmfare Award for Best Male Debut – Tamil for his performance in the film. Salmaan felt that the film did not work in Malayalam due to the different sensibilities of the audience.

Salmaan established himself as a leading actor with Anjali Menon's Malayalam film Bangalore Days, his third release of 2014. Salmaan played a biker Arjun, opposite Parvathy, with Nivin Pauly and Nazriya Nazim as his cousins. The film emerged as one of the highest-grossing Malayalam films of all time, grossing around ₹500 million (US$5.3 million). Aswin J Kumar of The Times of India noted, "Dulquer brings in a rugged charm and a brusque carelessness into Arjun." Later that year, he appeared in Lal Jose's Malayalam film Vikramadithyan, where he played a police officer. It was a box office success. His year's last release was Renjith's Malayalam film Njaan, which he called his "most challenging film yet". His performance received favourable reviews and earned him his second Filmfare Best Actor – Malayalam nomination.

Further success came in 2015 with two films opposite Nithya Menen—Jenuse Mohamed's Malayalam film 100 Days of Love, and Mani Ratnam's Tamil film O Kadhal Kanmani, where he played a video game developer. Baradwaj Rangan wrote: "Dulquer checks off all boxes in the 'Can You Be The Next Madhavan?' questionnaire" and Haricharan Pudipeddi noted, "Dulquer is at ease, speaking his lines in Tamil; he looked most suitable in the role." Though both believed the film belonged primarily to Menen. Salmaan next played the titular role of a carefree vagabond in the Malayalam film Charlie opposite Parvathy. His performance earned him the Kerala State Film Award for Best Actor, in addition to his third Filmfare Best Actor – Malayalam nomination. Vishnu Varma of The Indian Express noted, "For a film that gravitates and leans too much on the central character, Dulquer clearly does not disappoint. He has set the bar indeed high with this role." All three films emerged as box office successes, thus establishing his career.

Salmaan had two film releases in 2016. He first played a man facing anger management issues in the Malayalam film Kali, opposite Sai Pallavi. The film emerged a commercial success. Deepa Soman of The Times of India stated, "Dulquer is quite convincing, without excess drama. The action scenes showcase his attitude and style." He then played a lower cast boy in another Malayalam release Kammatipaadam, which garnered critical acclaim; Salmaan's performance being praised. Both performances earned him the Filmfare Critics Award for Best Actor – Malayalam. That year, he also had a cameo appearance in the Malayalam film Annmariya Kalippilaanu.

=== Career progression and critical acclaim (2017–2021) ===
Salmaan had three film releases in 2017. He first appeared in the Malayalam film Jomonte Suvisheshangal opposite Anupama Parameswaran and Aishwarya Rajesh. Despite comparisons with the 2016 Malayalam drama Jacobinte Swargarajyam, the film did well commercially. His next appearance was in another Malayalam film Comrade in America. The Hindu called it "Dulquer's big hit of 2017". After a cameo appearance in Parava, He then portrayed four roles in the Malayalam-Tamil bilingual anthology Solo. The film faced immense backlash from the audience. Despite negative reviews, his performance was well received and Deepa Soman noted, "Dulquer, who plays four distinct characters, has also showcased a worthy performance. Especially as Siva, the gangster, he looks a lot more convincing in Solo than in other movies in which he has tried the role."

In 2018, Salmaan expanded beyond Malayalam films. He first made his Telugu film debut with Mahanati, playing Gemini Ganesan opposite Keerthy Suresh, who played Savitri. His performance earned him the Filmfare Critics Award for Best Actor – Telugu, in addition to his first nomination for the Filmfare Award for Best Actor – Telugu. The film emerged as one of the highest grossing Telugu film of all time. Hemnath Kumar noted, "Dulquer is terrific as Ganesan, and it is his charm and flamboyance that pours life into the narrative throughout the first half." Following this, he made his debut in Hindi films with Karwaan, co-starring Irrfan Khan, Mithila Palkar and Kriti Kharbanda. The film was a moderate success at the box office. Anna MM Vetticad noted, "Dulquer gives a gripping performance as the self-effacing Avinash. He and Irrfan are absolute dears in a sweetly understated road flick."

Both of Salmaan's 2019 films performed poorly at the box office. He first appeared in the Malayalam film Oru Yamandan Premakadha opposite Nikhila Vimal. He then played Indian cricket team's captain in the Hindi film The Zoya Factor opposite Sonam Kapoor. Despite mixed reviews, his performance was positively receive, and Nandini Ramnath was appreciative of his "camera-friendly manner and outsized charm" that stands out.

Salmaan appeared in three films in 2020 and also launched his production company, Wayfarer Films. He first appeared opposite Kalyani Priyadarshan in the Malayalam film Varane Avashyamund, which was his first production. The film emerged as one of the year's highest grossing release. Cris of The News Minute stated, "Dulquer perhaps gets the least of the screen time and the actor appreciably does his little part well and lets the seniors take over." He then played a con man opposite Ritu Varma in the Tamil film Kannum Kannum Kollaiyadithaal, which earned him his first nomination for Filmfare Award for Best Actor – Tamil. S. Subhakeerthana noted, "If we look beyond Dulquer's box office pull, it is his energy, screen presence and earnest approach to acting that takes the cake in the film." The film was a box office success. He then appeared in a cameo in his production Malayalam film Maniyarayile Ashokan.

His only release in 2021 was the Malayalam film Kurup, where he played the titular role of Sukumara Kurup opposite Sobhita Dhulipala. The film marked his third production venture. One of the highest grossing Malayalam film of all time, it became his highest grosser at that time. Haricharan Pudipeddi noted: "As the central character, Dulquer plays Kurup with unmatchable swag and effortlessness, adding swag and sincerity while playing the elusive fugitive."

=== Commercial success and recognition (2022–present) ===
Salmaan's first release of 2022 was the Tamil film Hey Sinamika opposite Aditi Rao Hydari and Kajal Aggarwal. It was a box office failure. His next co-production, Malayalam film Salute opposite Diana Penty was released on SonyLIV and fetched him positive reviews for his portrayal of a police officer. Salmaan then appeared in the Telugu film Sita Ramam opposite Mrunal Thakur, that won him the Filmfare Critics Award for Best Actor – Telugu. Despite being a Malayali, he dubbed in all the languages in which the film was released, thus becoming a prominent pan-Indian actor with the film. The film and his performance received critical acclaim and the film proved to be a major commercial success at the box-office. Janani K of India Today noted, "Dulquer Salmaan hit it out of the park with their performance. Dulquer as Ram and Mrunal as Sita are picture perfect." His last release that year was the Hindi film Chup: Revenge of the Artist, which received mixed reviews.

In 2023, Salmaan first appeared in the Hindi web series Guns & Gulaabs, a Netflix series. He played a Narcotics officer opposite Pooja Gor. Saibal Chatterjee stated that he gives a "wonderful performance". Next he appeared in the Malayalam film King of Kotha opposite Aishwarya Lekshmi, which he also co-produced, but was a box office failure. That year, he also starred in the music video "Heeriye", sung by Jasleen Royal and Arijit Singh. Salmaan started 2024 with a cameo appearance in the Telugu film Kalki 2898 AD, which became the year's second highest-grossing Indian film. His next release that year was another Telugu film Lucky Baskhar opposite Meenakshi Chaudhary. Sangeetha Devi Dundoo noted, "Dulquer portrays Baskhar with all sincerity. Dulquer is in control, both in speaking the language and enhancing the solid writing in the later portions." A box office success, it emerged as his highest grossing release. His performance won him the Telangana Gaddar Film Award – Special Jury.

== Personal life ==
On 22 December 2011, Salmaan married architect Amal Sufiya in an arranged marriage. Amal comes from a North Indian Muslim family settled in Chennai. The couple has a daughter born on 5 May 2017. In an interview, Dulquer revealed he and Amal attended the same school. Dulquer later initiated contact by messaging Amal on Facebook to arrange a coffee meeting.

== Other work and public image ==
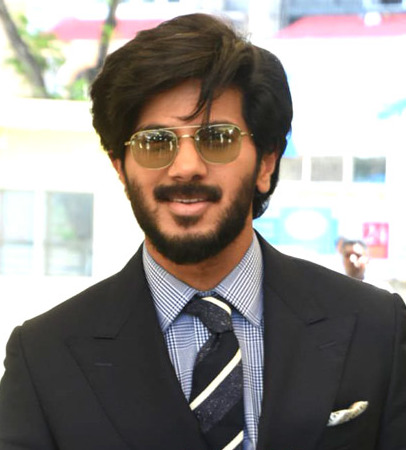
Salmaan in 2019

Salmaan is considered among the most popular and highest-paid actors of Malayalam cinema. In 2017, he appeared in Forbes India's Celebrity 100 list, where he was placed at 79th position with an estimated annual income of ₹92.8 million (US$990,000). He stood at the 6th place in its most influential stars on Instagram in South cinema for the year 2021. Salmaan was placed fifth in Rediff.com "Best Malayalam Actor" list of 2012 and 2015. A research study conducted in 2023 by Indian Institute of Human Brands (IIHB) stated that Salmaan was the second highest-ranked celebrity in Malayalam cinema.

Salmaan was ranked fourth by GQ in their listing of the 50 most influential young Indians of 2016. He was also featured by GQ in their listing of the Best Dressed Men India 2016. Salmaan was named the Kochi Times Most Desirable Man in 2013, 2014 and 2020. In 2019, Salmaan became the first Malayalam actor to get featured on the cover of Vogue India. Salmaan has acted in a short film as part of the Kerala motor vehicle department's safe riding campaign. He donated 150 items, including clothing, shoes, books, school supplies and crockery items, as a part of the Chennai Gives initiative. In addition, he used to run a web portal for trading cars, and a dental business chain in Chennai. He also is the director of the Bangalore-based Motherhood Hospital. Salmaan is a celebrity endorser for brands such as Myntra, JSW Paints, Smoodh and PhonePe. In 2024, Salmaan was placed 59th on IMDb's List of 100 Most Viewed Indian Stars.

== Discography ==
List of Dulquer Salmaan songs
Year	Album	Song	Featuring Artists	Notes	Ref.
2013	ABCD: American-Born Confused Desi	"Johny Mone Johny"	Gopi Sundar, Anna Katharina Valayil		
2014	Manglish	"Njanga Poneanutta"	Gopi Sundar		
2015	Charlie	"Chundari Penne"	Gopi Sundar		
2017	Comrade in America	"Vaanam Thilathilakkanu"	Gopi Sundar		
2017	Comrade in America	"Kerala Manninayi"	Gopi Sundar		
2017	Parava	"Ormakal"	Rex Vijayan		
2018	Kalyanam	"Dhrithangapulakithan"	Prakash Alex		
2018	Malayala Manorama	"Puthu Malayalam"		Ad	
2019	Dear Comrade	"Comrade Anthem"	Justin Prabhakaran, Stony Psyko, Dope Daddy, MC Vickey	Malayalam version	
2019	Sarbath Kadha	"Sarbath Anthem"			
2020	Maniyarayile Ashokan	"Unnimaya Song"	Sreehari K. Nair, Jacob Gregory		
2021	Kurup	"Dingiri Dingale"	Sulaiman Kakkodan		
2022	Hey Sinamika	"Achamillai Achamillai"	Govind Vasantha	Tamil song	
2026	I'm Game	"Loser"	Neeraj Madhav, Reble, Jakes Bejoy, K.C. Balasarangan		

== Accolades ==
Salmaan has received the Kerala State Film Award for Best Actor for Charlie. Additionally, he has won five Filmfare Awards South out of eleven nominations: Best Male Debut – South for Ustad Hotel and Vaayai Moodi Pesavum, Best Actor Critics – Malayalam for Kali and Kammatipaadam, and Best Actor Critics – Telugu for Mahanati and Sita Ramam. He has also won Gaddar Telangana State Film Award – Special Jury for Lucky Baskhar.
