= Solo (2017 film) =

2017 Indian film by Bejoy Nambiar

- Theatrical release poster
- Directed by: Bejoy Nambiar
- Written by: Bejoy Nambiar
- Dialogues by: Dhanya Suresh (Malayalam); Kartik R. Iyer (Tamil)
- Produced by: Abraham Mathew; Sherisha Technologies Private Limited; Bejoy Nambiar
- Starring: Dulquer Salmaan; Dhansika; Neha Sharma; Deepti Sati; Sruthi Hariharan; Arthi Venkatesh; Dino Morea; Soubin Shahir; Manoj K. Jayan
- Cinematography: Girish Gangadharan; Madhu Neelakandan; Sejal Shah
- Edited by: A. Sreekar Prasad
- Music by: Abhinav Bansal; Gaurav Godkhindi; Sooraj S. Kurup; Prashant Pillai; Govind Menon
- Production companies: Getaway Films; Refex Entertainment
- Distributed by: Abaam Movies
- Release date: 5 October 2017
- Running time: 154 minutes (Tamil); 152 minutes (Malayalam)
- Country: India
- Languages: Malayalam; Tamil

Solo is a 2017 Indian experimental anthology film co-written, co-produced and directed by Bejoy Nambiar starring Dulquer Salmaan in a quadruple role as Shekhar, Trilok, Siva and Rudra. Shot simultaneously in Malayalam and Tamil, production began during November 2016. Solo tells the story of four people, each story revolving around four elements: Earth, Fire, Wind and Water, each with the facets of Lord Shiva.

The film was released on 5 October 2017 worldwide and received positive reviews from critics and audiences. The film was dubbed in Telugu as Athade, which released on 22 June 2018. A Hindi dubbed version titled Tatva was also made available.

== Plot ==
The film consists of four independent stories, all of which star Dulquer Salmaan as the protagonist: Shekhar, Trilok, Siva and Rudra.

=== World of Shekhar (Blind Love) ===
Based on the Element of Water, it is a love story set against the backdrop of a college about Shekhar, a stammering, daring but loving young man and Radhika, a blind, talented dancer. The narrative starts 4 years ago in college, when an argument breaks out over whether Radhika loves Shekhar's friend Nelson or a guy named Sanju. Finally, Radhika confesses her love for Shekhar in front of everyone and their love story begins. Their families do not approve of their relationship. But when Radhika reveals that she is pregnant with his child, the families eventually agree for the wedding. On the day of her check up, the doctor reveals that Radhika's blindness is something genetic and the child will also face the same after a certain age. Sekhar's family decides that both mother and the child will be a burden for them and Radhika backs out from the wedding. However, Sekhar talks to her and convinces her to marry him. Their family also reluctantly agree. They get married and celebrate the happiest days of their lives but Radhika goes into labour and passes away due to complications in the delivery. Shekhar, not being able to face the death of his beloved goes out on his bike, only to meet with an accident. The story ends with Shekhar playing with their daughter on a beach, thereby fulfilling the promise made to Radhika to take their daughter everywhere she wishes before she loses her eyesight; just as Radhika's father did for her before she lost her eyesight.

=== World of Trilok (The Cyclist) ===
Based on the Element of Wind. The story begins with Aisha whose cycle collides with a car being driven by Thomas Zachariah. Thomas' son-in-law Justin decides to save her, but Thomas declines. Justin puts her in the car anyway and rushes to the hospital, but Aisha dies on the way. Instead of taking the body to the hospital, Thomas disposes it on the road.

Four years later, Justin and his wife Annie are saddened by the demise of Thomas. After returning from a business deal, Justin discovers that his car brakes are not working. The car crashes leaving Justin wounded, but he is saved by Dr Trilok Menon, a veterinary surgeon. As Trilok rushes to the hospital with Justin, Justin notices a photo of Aisha in Trilok's car and realizes she was his wife.

After recovering, Justin tells everything to Annie and decides to tell the truth to Trilok. Justin narrates the whole incident. Trilok reveals that it was really him who killed Thomas, that the accident was orchestrated by him too, and he also injected a drug in Justin's drip a few minutes ago which would make him brain dead. He says he was tracking them all these years and had heard everything that Thomas and Justin said during the incident through Aisha's BlueTooth earbuds, revealing to him that she was pregnant and was still alive even after they disposed her off. Trilok then exits the room leaving Justin to die.

=== World of Siva (Ties of Blood) ===
Based on the Element of Fire. Siva's mother leaves him, his father, and his brother Siddhu. Years later, Siva is now a gangster working under his mentor Bhadran, a crime boss. Siva protects his brother and is harsh on his wife Rukku. Siddhu is invited to join the gang by Bhadran, when he is released from prison for almost killing someone in the middle of the college.

Siva's life changes when his father is found shot in a bar. From the bar's CCTV records, it is revealed that his father was killed by Vishnu, a crime boss in Mumbai and Siva decides to take revenge. Siva along with two of his gang members Nandha and Prabha goes to Mumbai. On the bus to Mumbai, Siddhu is found by Nandha and Siva attempts to throw him out but Nandha allows him to stay. On reaching Mumbai, Siva joins hands with a gangster to eliminate Vishnu.

The next night Siva and gang reach Vishnu and start a shootout in a ritual place, which gets Prabha and many others are killed. Siva eliminates almost every member of Vishnu's gang and Siddhu escapes, and rushing to Siva only to see him get killed by Vishnu. Siddhu and Nandha manage to escape and reach their hideout. The next morning, revenge and fury filled Siddhu takes Nandha's gun and goes to Vishnu's house, only to be shocked by seeing his mother there who is Vishnu's sister, and Vishnu is his uncle. It is revealed that this was why Vishnu killed his father as what he deserved, for treating his sister in such a manner. As Vishnu enters the room, Siddhu shoots him in the chest and kills him and his mother begs him to escape. The story ends with a grieving Siddhu running through the streets of Mumbai.

=== World of Rudra (Everything is fair in love and war) ===
Based on the Element Earth. Rudra Ramachandran is an army trainee and is the son of Brig. Ramachandran who is madly in love with Akshara. He is quite aggressive in behaviour and constantly ruins Akshara's marriage proposals. Akshara's father Sundararajan decides to file a case against him in order to expel him from the army as revenge for his aggressive actions, but Rudra's father and mother request him not to. Later, Akshara tells Rudra that she got admission for a degree in Australia and has to leave soon. She promises that she will always be his.

Four years later, Rudra is an army officer narrating the story to his senior officer Col. Raunaq Sachdeva and team. He tells them that Akshara has not contacted him since and when he went to Australia, she refused to see him. He informs them that her marriage has been fixed, but he yearns to know why she became a stranger to him. Raunaq says that his team must never accept defeat and that Rudra must go to her marriage. Rudra along with others go to Akshara's house on the eve of her marriage. Rudra sees her but she refuses to talk to him. That night, Rudra barges in and demands Alok, Akshara's fiancé to fight with him. Alok, a policeman and a boxing champion, beats up Rudra, but Raunaq motivates him to fight back. Rudra brutally beats up Alok but is hindered by Akshara who tells him that it was really his father who asked her not to be with him. A shocked Rudra leaves the gathering. Later, his mother tells him that his father had an affair with another woman when Rudra was 2 years old and that his parents were on the verge of divorce. Although he ended the affair for the sake of living for Rudra, the woman was pregnant. The woman is revealed to be Akshara's mother which makes Akshara Rudra's half-sister. The film ends with Rudra asking for forgiveness from Alok on the day of his marriage with Akshara.

== Cast ==
- Dulquer Salmaan in a quadruple role as
  - Shekhar.
  - Dr. Trilok Menon.
  - Siva.
  - Lt. Rudra Ramachandran.

World of Shekhar	World of Trilok
Dulquer Salmaan as Shekhar, a stammering college student; Dhansika as Radhika, a blind dancer, and Shekhar's love interest; Soubin Shahir as Pattu (in Malayalam), Shekhar's best friend. He makes a cameo in a song of the Tamil version.; Sathish as Pattu (in Tamil), Shekhar's best friend. He makes a cameo in a song of the Malayalam version; John Vijay as Shravan, Radhika's brother; Sheelu Abraham as Malini, Shekhar's sister; Aas Mohammad Abbasi as Shekhar's friend; Siddharth Menon as Nelson, Shekhar's friend; Anupama Kumar; Nithya Shri; Kishore Rajkumar	Dulquer Salmaan as Trilok Menon, a veterinary doctor; Arthi Venkatesh as Aisha, Trilok's wife; Anson Paul as Justin; Ann Augustine as Annie Thomas, Justin's wife; Renji Panicker as Thomas Zachariah, Annie's father (in Malayalam); Azhagam Perumal as Thomas Zachariah, Annie's father (in Tamil)
World of Siva	World of Rudra
Dulquer Salmaan as Siva, a dreaded gangster; Sruthi Hariharan as Rukku, Siva's wife; Manoj K. Jayan as Bhadhran, a crime boss and Siva's mentor; Prakash Belawadi as Vishnu, a Mumbai-based crime boss; Govind Menon as Nandha, a member of Bhadran's gang; Dinesh Prabhakar as Praba, a member of Bhadran's gang; Rohan Manoj as Siddhu, Shiva's brother; Qaushiq Mukherjee as a Mumbai gangster; Sai Tamhankar as Sati; Peethambaram Menon as Shiva's and Siddhu's father; Asha Jayaram as Shiva's and Siddhu's mother	Dulquer Salmaan as Lt. Rudra Ramachandran, an army officer; Neha Sharma as Akshara (in Malayalam);Bhama (in Tamil),Rudra's love interest and half-sister (Speculated); Manit Joura as Alok, Akshara's fiancé; Dino Morea as Col. Raunaq Sachdeva, Rudra's senior officer; Nassar as Brig. Ramachandran, Rudra's father; Suhasini Mani Ratnam as Mrs Vidya Ramachandran, Rudra's mother; Deepti Sati as Daisy, Rudra's teammate; Ankith Madhav as Sreekanth; Suresh Chandra Menon as Brig. Sundarrajan, Akshara's father; Sujata Sehgal as Latika Sundarrajan, Akshara's mother; Mona Mathews as Alok's Mother

== Production ==
In September 2016, Bejoy Nambiar revealed that he was preparing a script for a Malayalam film starring Dulquer Salmaan in the lead role. Nambiar stated that he would also produce the venture under his home studio, Getaway Films, in association with Abaam Movies. The following month, the film was titled as Solo and Nambiar revealed that it would be simultaneously shot and released in Tamil.

The film began production on 14 November 2016 in Kochi, with Chennai-based model Arthi Venkatesh making her debut as a leading actress in the film. The first schedule was completed within ten days, with the team shooting for up to twelve hours a day. Anson Paul and actress Ann Augustine were added to the film to play a couple. Following a production break, the second shooting schedule began in March 2017 in Kochi and then moved to Mumbai, following the completion of Dulquer's filming work for Comrade in America (2017). Actress Sruthi Hariharan joined the project during the second schedule, as did actresses Sai Tamhankar and Asha Jayaram for two further leading female roles. Actors Manoj K. Jayan, Prakash Belawadi and filmmaker Qaushiq Mukherjee also joined the cast during the second schedule, while Govind Menon and Siddharth Menon were signed as the film's music composers along with other composers and also agreed to play musicians in the film. R. Parthiepan also revealed that he had signed to work on the film in a supporting role.

The third schedule for film was started in Kochi during April 2017, with several more additions to the cast. Actress Dhansika was signed to play a leading role of a visually-challenged dancer, while actors Sathish, John Vijay, Sheelu Abraham and Soubin Shahir also joined the team. The team moved to film another segment of the anthology in Lonavala during May 2017 with actors Dino Morea, Neha Sharma and Deepti Sati playing important roles. Nassar and Suhasini also joined the team during the schedule to portray parents of Dulquer's character in the segment.

The animated sequences for the film were created by Plexus, a Mumbai-based motion design and visual effects studio.

== Soundtrack ==
The film's soundtrack has twenty-two songs recorded by an assortment of musicians.

== Reception ==
The Times of India reviewer Deepa Soman rated it 3.5/5 and stated:' An experimental romantic thriller, Solo is the story of four men, their love, rage and afterlife. Through four elements – water, air, fire and earth, they also represent different facets of Lord Siva.

Baradwaj Rangan of Film Companion South wrote "Primarily, the film is another casualty of making a bilingual. The supporting cast looks off. The tone is all over the place. And the stories look like they belong neither here nor there. "
