= Jomonte Suvisheshangal =

2017 film by Sathyan Anthikad

Jomonte SuvisheshangalI
- Theatrical release poster
- Directed by: Sathyan Anthikad
- Written by: Iqbal Kuttippuram
- Produced by: Sethu Mannarkad
- Starring: Dulquer Salmaan; Mukesh; Aishwarya Rajesh; Anupama Parameswaran
- Cinematography: S. Kumar
- Edited by: K. Rajagopal
- Music by: Vidyasagar
- Production company: Full Moon Cinema
- Distributed by: Kalasangham Films; Evergreen Films
- Release date: 19 January 2017
- Running time: 156 minutes
- Country: India
- Language: Malayalam
- Box office: est. ₹43.67 crore

Jomonte Suvisheshangal (transl. Jomon's Gospels) is a 2017 Indian Malayalam-language family drama film directed by Sathyan Anthikkad and written by Iqbal Kuttippuram. The film stars Dulquer Salmaan, Mukesh, Aishwarya Rajesh (in her Malayalam debut) and Anupama Parameswaran in the lead roles.

== Plot ==
Jomon is an irresponsible son, the third, of self-made businessman and widower Vincent. The story, set in Thrissur, revolves around Vincent's family, and the relationship between the father and the son. Vincent, who is very fond of his son, constantly but unsuccessfully tries to instill in him a sense of responsibility.

Jomon falls in love with Catherine, whom he met in the church while attending the Sunday mass on his father's insistence. Vincent also puts Jomon in charge of gent's wear store so that his son develops a sense of maturity. However, to Vincent's dismay, Jomon sells it to the store manager, for an amount of ₹40 lakh. It is later revealed that Jomon sold the store, along with his expensive motorcycle, to invest in and become the managing partner of a textile store in Tiruppur along with his friend Mushtaq.

Meanwhile, a financial catastrophe befalls Vincent. He loses all his property and is evicted from his house. Abandoned by all other family members, he joins Jomon in Thiruppur where they begin to live a modest life. Jomon is forced to terminate his relationship with Catherine due to the family's newfound financial constraints.

Jomon's life in Thiruppur is equally turbulent as the new business venture fails as a result of Mushtaq's extravagant lifestyle. He starts working as a salesman for a textile company, during the course of which he befriends Vaidehi, an accountant at a textile manufacturing company he happens to visit on business. Vincent, who also has difficulties adjusting to the new lifestyle, takes up the job of a tailor to fund his expensive habit of smoking imported cigarettes.

After a series of setbacks in their business, Jomon and Mushtaq, along with Vaidehi, manage to successfully build a new business venture. Soon, Jomon is able to buy back Vincent's old house and the family reunites with new lessons learnt. In the end it is revealed to Vincent (who thought his son had only learned the importance of money but not of relationships) that Jomon had fallen in love with Vaidehi, who moved into Thrissur along with her father.

== Cast ==
- Dulquer Salmaan as Jomon T. Vincent
- Mukesh as Vincent, Jomon's father
- Aishwarya Rajesh as Vaidehi Perumal
- Anupama Parameswaran as Catherine
- Shivaji Guruvayoor as Ravunni
- Manobala as Perumal
- Jacob Gregory as Muzthaq
- Indu Thampy as Dr. Jeslin Alphonse, Jomon's sister-in-law
- Innocent as Palodan
- Muthumani as Laly, Jomon's sister
- Vinu Mohan as Dr. Alphonse Vincent, Jomon's brother
- Irshad as Joshy
- Nandu as Dr. Kuriakose
- Rasna Pavithran as Tessa
- Rahul Ravi as Tessa's husband
- Disney James as Tony
- Ashvin Mathew as David
- Sethulakshmi as T. C. Mariyamma
- Harish Siva as friend
- Chembil Ashokan
- Veenah Naair as Catherine's mother
- Vinod Kedamangalam
- Kottachi as SriMuruga Texport Manager
- Supergood Subramani as Garments factory owner

== Production ==
Principal photography commenced from August 2016 in Thrissur. The second schedule started on 21 October in Tirupur.

== Soundtrack ==
Jomonte Suvisheshangal

Soundtrack album by Vidyasagar
- Released: 2 December 2016
- Recorded: Varsha Vallaki Studios
- Genre: Feature Film Soundtrack
- Length: 13:06
- Language: Malayalam
- Label: Muzik247
- Producer: Vidyasagar

Vidyasagar chronology
Thoppil Joppan (2016)	Jomonte Suvisheshangal (2016)	Thiruttu Payale 2 (2016)
External audio
- Official Audio Jukebox on YouTube

The music and score for the film is composed by Vidyasagar with lyrics penned by Rafeeq Ahammed. Vidyasagar is working with Sathyan Anthikad for the third time. The complete album was released by Muzik247 in their official YouTube channel on 2 December 2016. The film had three songs.

Track listing
No.	Title	Singer(s)	Length
1.	"Nokki Nokki"	Abhay Jodhpurkar, Merin Gregory	4:18
2.	"Poonkattey"	Balram	4:22
3.	"Neelakasham"	Najim Arshad, Sujatha Mohan	4:26
Total length:			13:06

== Release ==
=== Theatrical ===
Initially, Jomonte Suvisheshangal was scheduled to release on 16 December 2016. Later, the date was pushed and was released on 19 January 2017 due to a theatre strike in Kerala. The film was released in Dubai on 1 February 2017.

== Reception ==
=== Box office ===
Jomonte Suvisheshangal collected ₹24 crore from Kerala alone, ₹5.6 crore from rest of India, ₹9.97 crore from UAE-GCC and ₹4.1 crore from rest of the worldwide box office. The film ran for 60 days in its theatres and it collected around ₹43.67 crore from the worldwide box office.

=== Critical reception ===
S.R. Praveen of The Hindu wrote "This is the Sathyan Anthikkad version of what you have seen in the similarly named Jacobinte Swargarajyam, it's all about the chemistry between the father and the son, something which we have seen in quite a number of Sathyan movies". The Times of India gave 3 out of 5 stars stating "Jomon’s tale can definitely be a hit with the section of audience for who relate to elements like family sentiments, human traits of endurance and parent-child bond. The movie can also win the hearts of fans of Dulquer Salmaan and his mannerisms as the actor indeed comes across as charming in a few sequences". India Today gave 3 out of 5 stars stating "Jomonte Suveshishangal soars high with its pleasing story. The film itself is one of those enjoyable long rides one would take with a Yesudas song".

The Indian Express gave 3 out of 5 stars stating "Jomonte Suveshishangal is a delightful film written by Iqbal Kuttippuram. The film narrates the uplifting journey of its title character, played by Dulquer Salmaan. Mukesh and Dulquer as father and son are delightful".

== Home media ==
Though initially, the movie didn't have a streaming partner, it strarted streaming on ManoramaMax after the launch of the service. The Telugu version Andamaina Jeevitham was released on Amazon Prime Video for streaming.

== Awards and nominations ==
Date of ceremony	Award	Category	Recipient(s) and nominee(s)	Result	Ref.
16 June 2018	Filmfare Awards South	Best Supporting Actress – Malayalam	Aishwarya Rajesh	Nominated	
14 &15 September 2018	South Indian International Movie Awards	Best Actor in a Supporting Role – Malayalam	Mukesh	Nominated	
14 &15 September 2018	South Indian International Movie Awards	Best Comedian – Malayalam	Jacob Gregory	Nominated	
14 &15 September 2018	South Indian International Movie Awards	Best Female Playback Singer – Malayalam	Sujatha Mohan	Nominated	
2017-11-28	Asiavision Awards	Outstanding Performer – National	Aishwarya Rajesh	Won	
