= Jayaram Kailas =

Indian film director

- Occupation: Film Director
- Years active: 2015 - present

Jayaram Kailas is an Indian film director, lyricist, and singer who works primarily in Malayalam cinema.

He made his directorial debut with Akkaldhamayile Pennu in 2015, which went on to win two Kerala Film Critics Awards in 2016. He later directed Ambalamukkile Visheshangal, with Gokul Suresh as lead, which was released in December 2025. Jayaram Kailas was also a member of the jury for the National Film Awards, appointed by the Directorate of Film Festivals, Government of India.

== Career ==
Jayaram Kailas is known for choosing unconventional subjects and socially relevant themes in his films. His debut feature Akkaldhamayile Pennu (2015) received critical acclaim and earned him recognition at the Kerala Film Critics Awards in 2016.

In 2025, he directed Ambalamukkile Visheshangal, featuring Gokul Suresh in the lead role. The film attracted media attention for its rural setting, music, and narrative approach. The director also contributed to the music and lyrics of the film.

== Awards ==
- Kerala Film Critics Association Awards (2016) – Special Jury Award for Direction (Akkaldhamayile Pennu)

== As Jury Member ==
- National Film Awards Jury Member – Selected by the Directorate of Film Festivals, Government of India

== Filmography ==
Year	Film	Language	Starring	Notes
2015	Akkaldhamayile Pennu	Malayalam	Swetha Menon, Lal, Vineeth, Malavika Nair	
2025	Ambalamukkile Visheshangal	Malayalam	Gokul Suresh, Lal, Ganapathi S Pothuval, Major Ravi, Dharmajan Bolgatty, Mareena Michael	
2026	TBA	Malayalam	TBA	

== Discography ==
Year	Film	Song	Lyrics	Singer	Notes
2025	Ambalamukkile Visheshangal	Oru Koottam	Jayaram Kailas	Jayaram Kailas, Ranjin Raj	
