= Panjikaran =

Panjikaran is a surname. Notable people with the surname include:

- Alphy Panjikaran (born 1990), Indian actress
- Joseph C. Panjikaran (1888–1949), Indian Catholic monsignor, historian, theologian and journalist
