= Karnan Napoleon Bhagath Singh =

2022 Malayalam Film

Karnan Napoleon Bhagat Singh
- Theatrical release poster
- Directed by: Sarath G Mohan
- Written by: Sarath G Mohan
- Produced by: Monu Pazhedath
- Starring: Dheeraj Denny; Aadhya Prasad; Indrans; Joy Mathew
- Cinematography: Prasanth Krishna
- Edited by: Reckson Joseph
- Music by: Ranjin Raj
- Production company: First Page Entertainment
- Release date: 4 February 2022
- Country: India
- Language: Malayalam

Karnan Napoleon Bhagath Singh is a 2022 Indian Malayalam-language family thriller-cum-murder mystery written and directed by Sarath G Mohan. The film stars Dheeraj Denny, Aadhya Prasad, Indrans, Joy Mathew, Nandu, Vijaya Kumar, Rony David Raj, Eldho Mathew, Althaf Salim, Aneesh Gopal and Karthik Vishnu. The film was produced by Monu Pazhedath under the banner of First Page Entertainment with music composed by Ranjin Raj. It was released on 4 February 2022 .

== Plot ==
This Malayalam-language film is a legal thriller-comedy that centers on a young man's struggle to fulfill his dream of joining the police force while being entangled in a local mystery.

The Protagonist's Ambition The story follows Sooraj, an aspiring police officer who is waiting for his official posting. He lives in a small, tight-knit village where his friends and neighbors look up to him. The title of the film refers to a popular dialogue from the 1991 film Bharatham, representing three iconic figures—Karnan (sacrifice), Napoleon (ambition), and Bhagath Singh (revolution)—which serves as a thematic backdrop for the characters' ideals.

The Conflict While Sooraj is on the verge of starting his career, a shadow is cast over his village due to a mysterious death.

The Incident: A local man is found dead under suspicious circumstances.

The Complication: Because Sooraj is "almost" a cop, the villagers and the local police begin to involve him in the informal investigation.

The Stakes: If Sooraj gets officially embroiled in a criminal case or a legal dispute before his induction, his entire career could be ruined.

The Investigation The plot thickens as Sooraj tries to balance his personal integrity with the reality of the investigation. He discovers that the death isn't as straightforward as it seems. The narrative shifts between:

Small-town Politics: How local egos and rivalries complicate the truth.

Friendship: The role of his close-knit circle of friends who provide both comic relief and genuine support.

Legal Hurdles: The tension of proving the truth without breaking the law himself.

The Resolution Through a mix of intuition and a bit of luck, Sooraj uncovers the truth behind the "murder." The film concludes with him navigating the gray areas of justice, ultimately clearing his path to join the police force while ensuring that the actual culprits are held accountable.

== Cast ==
- Dheeraj Denny as Roopesh
- Aadhya Prasad as Anu
- Indrans as Umar
- Joy Mathew as Cherian
- Nandu as K Paulose
- Jaffar Idukki as Uthaman
- Appa Haja as Mathew
- Vijayakumar (Malayalam actor) as Shasheedaran
- Rony David Raj as Manoj Poovanparamban
- Eldho Mathew as Pavithran
- Althaf Salim as Soji
- Aneesh Gopal as Joykutty
- Karthik Vishnu as Kunjoon
- Reshmi Boban as Susan (Cherian's Daughter)
- Abu Salim as Masthan Mani
- Sunil Sukhada as Father Akkara
- Bijukuttan as Estappan
- Binu Adimali as Suresh
- Sudheer Karamana as Vakachan
- Kulappulli Leela as Thenamma
- Sreelakshmi as Indira, Roopesh's Mother
- Balaji Sarma as Roy
- Kochu Preman as Devassy
- Boban Samuel as Latheef
- Shiny T. Rajan as Hairumma
- Dinesh Panicker as Police Officer
- Sethu Lakshmi as
- Molly Kanamally as
- Ullas Pandalam as
- Narayanankutty as
- Shaijo Adimali as
- Prasad Muhamma as

== Production ==
Antony Varghese released the title poster and announced Dheeraj Denny in a lead role. The first look of the film was revealed by Kunchacko Boban on 7 March 2020. It is directed by Sarath G Mohan. Later, the Unni Menon song "Kathorthu Kathorthu" from the film was released. On 2 November 2020 a teaser was released. and in January 2022 a trailer was released with the release date of the film.

== Music ==
The music of the film is composed by Ranjin Raj.

Karnan Napoleon Bhagath Singh

Soundtrack album by Ranjin Raj
- Released: 2022
- Recorded: 2021–2022
- Genre: Feature film soundtrack
- Length: 12:28
- Language: Malayalam
- Label: Muzik 247
- Producer: Ranjin Raj

Ranjin Raj chronology
Kaaval (2021)	Karnan Napoleon Bhagath Singh (2022)	Night Drive (2022)

Track listing
No.	Title	Lyrics	Singer(s)	Length
1.	"Enthinanente Chenthamare"	B. K. Harinarayanan	Ranjin Raj	4:03
2.	"Sayanna Theerangalil"	Rafeeq Ahamed	K. S. Harisankar	3:53
3.	"Kathorthu Kathorthu"	B. K. Harinarayanan	Unni Menon	4:32
Total length:				12:28

== Release ==
The film was scheduled to release on 28 January 2022. It was later postponed due to COVID-19 to 4 February 2022.

== Reception ==
A critic from Mathrubhumi wrote that "The film revolves around friendship, love and family relationships. This is also a film that gives importance to the mother character". A ManoramaOnline critic gave a mixed review. A citic from Samayam gave 3 stars out of 5 in a mixed review. Harikumar J. S of The Hindu wrote that " the debutant filmmaker says ‘Karnan Napoleon Bhagat Singh’, which is eyeing for a theatrical release, moves forward through the perspective of a young man gearing up to become a cop"
