= Nagendran's Honeymoons =

Indian dark comedy television miniseries

- Genre: Dark Comedy
- Written by: Nithin Renji Panicker
- Directed by: Nithin Renji Panicker
- Starring: Suraj Venjaramoodu; Alexander Prasanth; Kalabhavan Shajon
- Music by: Ranjin Raj
- Country of origin: India
- Original language: Malayalam
- No. of seasons: 1
- No. of episodes: 6

Production
- Producer: Nithin Renji Panicker
- Cinematography: Nikhil S Praveen
- Editor: Mansoor Muthootty
- Production company: Nithin Ranji Panicker productions in association with MGC(P) Ltd

Original release
- Network: Disney+ Hotstar
- Release: 19 July 2024

Nagendran's Honeymoons is a 2024 Indian dark comedy streaming television miniseries written, directed and produced by Nithin Renji Panicker. It stars Suraj Venjaramoodu, Alexander Prasanth and Kalabhavan Shajon in lead roles with Grace Antony, Shwetha Menon, Kani Kusruti, Alphy Panjikaran and Niranjana Anoop in other prominent roles. In the series, After marrying a second time without success, Nagendran continues his scheme, becoming a marriage swindler with wives scattered across the Kerala state in no time. The rest of the series follows their various schemes and their attempts to avoid getting caught.

The series premiered on 19 July 2024 on Disney + Hotstar.

== Synopsis ==
Nagendran, an unemployed man from Vellayani, Thiruvananthapuram, dreams of traveling abroad. To fund his trip, his friend devises a plan involving marriage and dowry. However, he doesn’t stop at just one marriage.

== Cast ==
- Suraj Venjaramoodu as Nagendran /Joseph /Ali Hussain /Govindan / Sukumaran
- Alexander Prasanth as Soman
- Kalabhavan Shajon as Inspector Varkey Avarachan
- Alphy Panjikaran as Janaki, Nagendran's first wife
- Grace Antony as Lilly Avarachan, Nagendran's second wife
- Shwetha Menon as Laila Sulthana, Nagendran's third wife
- Niranjana Anoop as Savithri, Nagendran's fourth wife
- Kani Kusruti as Thankam, Nagendran's fifth wife
- Ammu Abhirami as Mozhi, Soman's wife
- Bhanumathi as Naniyamma, Nagendran's mother
- Janardhanan as Avarachan, Varkey and Lilly's father
- Ramesh Pisharody as Paulose
- Sreejith Ravi as Yusuf, Lyla's deceased husband
- Sreekanth Murali as Krishnan Namboothiri, Savithri's father
- Shaalin Zoya as Rosey, Paulose's wife
- Reshmi Boban as Madhavi, Savithri's second mother
- Sreeram Ramachandran as Savithri's boyfriend
- Shanker Induchoodan as a villager teen
- Aristo Suresh as Gopi
- Priyanka Anoop as Sumathi, actress in Soman's drama troop
- Appukutty as a Tamilian village guy

== Production ==
The production of the series started from 16 June 2023. It wrapped up on 9 August 2023. The series was initially titled as Madhuvidhu but later it was changed to Nagendran's Honeymoons.

== Reception ==
The series mostly received mixed response from critics and audience. Vivek Santhosh of Cinema Express rated 2.5/5 stars and wrote: "Suraj Venjaramoodu makes it a navigable affair with sporadic laughs". S R Praveen of The Hindu wrote: "An unimaginatively written series that does not tread any new ground". Anandu Suresh of The Indian Express rated 2/5 stars and reviewed: "Suraj Venjaramoodu, Kani Kusruti’s Hotstar series oversimplifies and humorises marriage fraud". Akhila Menon of OTTPlay rated 2.5/5 stars and wrote: "Suraj Venjaramoodu shines in this dull and boring tale of weddings".
