= P. K. Sadanandan =

Indian artist (born 1965)

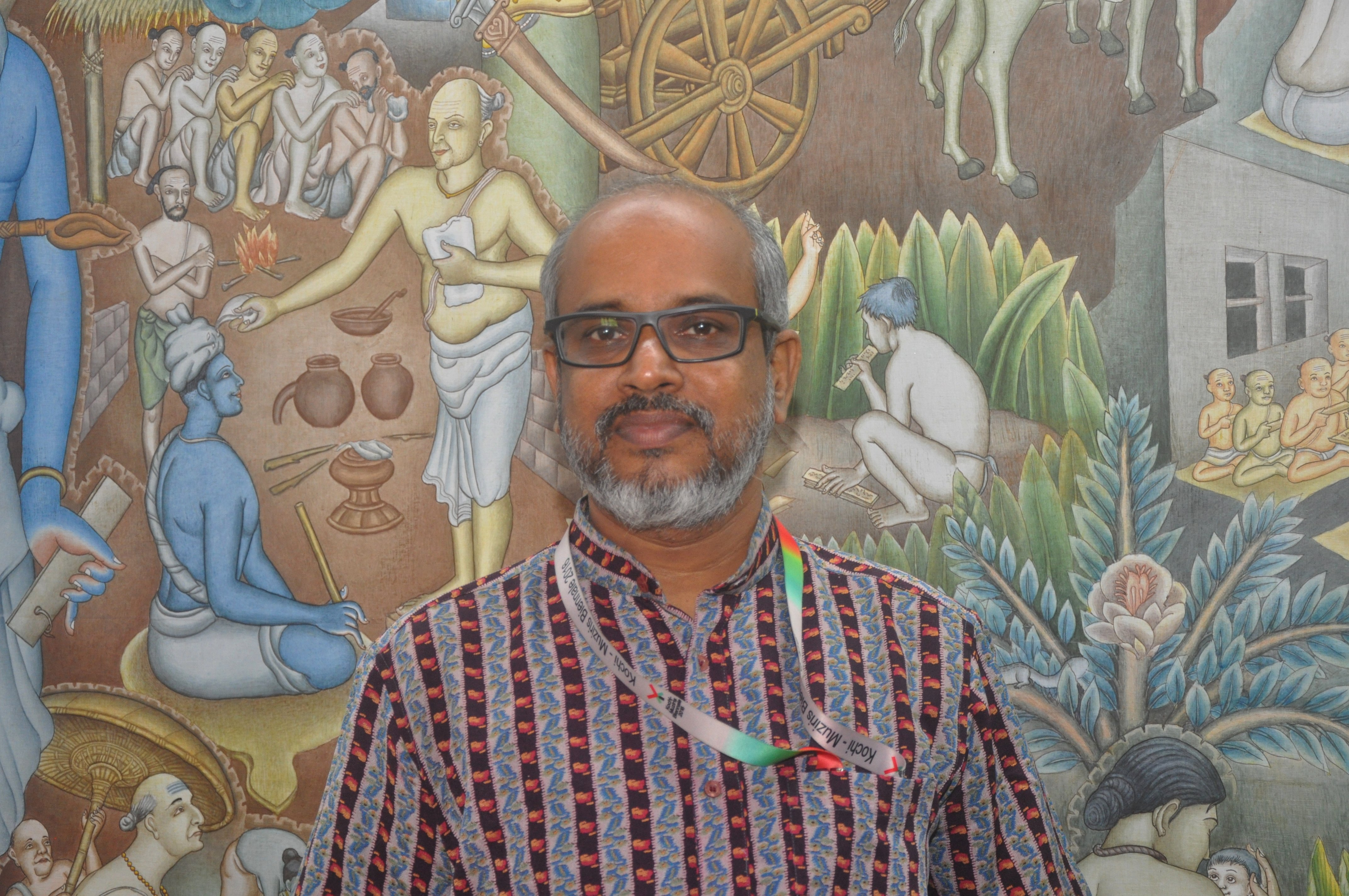
- Born: 1965 (age 60–61); Kerala, India
- Occupations: Mural painter, Cartoonist
- Years active: 1989–present
- Spouse: Asha Sadanandan
- Children: Aiswarya Lakshmi, Surya Bruhaspathy
- Relatives: Kalamandalam Bindhulekha, Madhav Ramdasan

P. K. Sadanandan is a mural painter and cartoonist from Kerala state, India.

== Early life and background ==
P K Sadanandan is a diploma holder in mural painting from the Institute of Mural Painting, Guruvayoor under the gurukula system. He did his Master of fine arts (MFA) from Karnataka Open University, Mysore, South India. He has also done various illustrations and cartoons for books and magazines besides working on restoration of old murals.

== Style ==
P K Sadaanandan has evolved his own style that "draws inspirations from the Ajanta and Ellora paintings." The predominant blue in his murals, is a notable deviation from the traditional Kerala mural style where red is the principal colour. His art-scape features icons and narratives inspired by mythology, encased within the natural elements and organic world.

== Art career ==
P K Sadanandan was involved in creating murals during renovation at Sree Padmanabha Temple In Trivandrum, Kerala. He was the Leader of the team. Around 3400 square feet area of wall Murals on sanctum- sanctorum was finished in Four and Half year (1993 to 1998). Since 1989, he has participated in several group shows worldwide. His first solo show was introduced By Smt. Sanjna Kapoor who was the Director of Prithvi gallery and theatre in Mumbai. After its Grand success his solo shows have been arranged all over the world, and continuing till date. He made biblical subjects on wall murals at St. Francis Xavier's Church, Trichur. It was during the renovation of the new church that the artist was asked to paint murals depicting important events from the life of Jesus Christ. He had created 14 murals that depicted the `Way of the Cross', assisted by Kalamandalam Bindulekha, his sister-in-law. They have been described as an attempt To fusion of Indian and Western traditions. He has also assisted his teacher, Mammiyoor Krishnankutty Nair, in painting murals at the Shree Padmanabhaswamy Temple at Thiruvananthapuram.

== List of awards ==
- AT Abu Memorial Award - for mural work
- All Kerala Creative Artists Association's awards - for cartoons
