= Malikappuram =

- Theatrical release poster
- Directed by: Vishnu Sasi Sankar
- Written by: Abhilash Pillai
- Produced by: Venu Kunnuppally; Anto Joseph
- Starring: Unni Mukundan Deva Nandha Sreepath; Saiju Kurup
- Narrated by: Mammootty
- Cinematography: Vishnu Narayanan
- Edited by: Shameer Muhammed
- Music by: Ranjin Raj
- Production companies: Kavya Film Company; Aan Mega Media
- Distributed by: Geetha Arts (Telugu); Trident Arts (Tamil)
- Release date: 30 December 2022
- Running time: 120 minutes
- Country: India
- Language: Malayalam
- Box office: est.₹99 crore

Malikappuram is a 2022 Indian Malayalam-language action adventure drama film directed by Vishnu Sasi Sankar and written by Abhilash Pillai. The film stars Unni Mukundan alongside Deva Nandha, Sreepath, Alphy Panjikaran, Sampath Ram, Saiju Kurup, Ramesh Pisharody, T. G. Ravi, Sreejith Ravi, Manoj K. Jayan, and Renji Panicker in supporting roles. The plot centres around Kallu, an eight-year-old girl who is a devotee of Ayyappan and desires to visit Sabarimala Temple.

The principal photography commenced in September 2022 and the film was wrapped up in November 2022. The film was shot in places like Konni, Kalleli, Lahai, Pamba, Erumely and Sabarimala Temple. The cinematography was done by Vishnu Narayanan, with editing handled by Shameer Muhammed. Ranjin Raj composed the soundtrack for the film.

Malikappuram was released theatrically on 30 December 2022 and received positive reviews from critics and emerged as a box office success, becoming the second highest grosser in Unni Mukundan's career after Marco (2024). It was featured at the 54th IFFI Indian panorama section.

== Plot ==
Kalyani (Kallu) is a devotee of the famous deity Ayyappan and is enthusiastic to visit the Sabarimala temple. As per religious beliefs, Kallu has a small window of two years to visit the temple as she is 8 years old. Her grandmother narrates the life of Lord Ayyappan to her, which she loves a lot. Ajayan is Kallu's father who has mortgaged their house and it is on the verge of being seized by the bank. Furthermore, Ajayan has also borrowed a huge sum from a local usurer and acquaintance Ambadi, and is unable to repay both the loans.

The bank has issued a seizure notice, which Ajayan hides from his family. Ajayan promises Kallu to take her to Sabarimala and that both will do the initial rituals for the pilgrimage, which is supposed to happen a few weeks from thereon. Ambadi publicly harasses and roughs up Ajayan, which is witnessed by Kallu. A humiliated Ajayan subsequently commits suicide out of disgrace. The bank eventually seizes Ajayan's house and Kallu's grandmother moves in with Ajayan's elder sister. Kallu and her mother move in with Ajayan's friend and neighbor Unni. Kallu becomes frustrated with the fact that she is unable to go to Sabarimala because of her father's death and yells at her classmate and Unni's son Piyoosh.

Piyoosh finds that it is impossible to dissuade Kallu from pursuing her journey to Sabarimala, and decides to accompany her. Both the kids board a bus to Pamba, and en route they meet Mahi, a local goon who is also a pedophile and trafficker. Under the pretext of heading to Sabarimala, he is on the lookout for young kids. His eyes fall on both Kallu and Piyoosh. Piyoosh senses that something is wrong and tries to persuade Kallu to stop the journey and head back home, but to no avail. Meanwhile, Unni and Kallu's mother informed the police about the missing children.

Later, a man named Ayyappan boards the bus, who also seems to be heading to Sabarimala, and gets acquainted with the kids. Mahi introduces himself as the kids’ guardian uncle to Ayyappan, which Ayyappan later finds out to be false and suspects that he has some malicious intentions. After hearing their story, Ayyappan promises the kids that he will accompany them to Sabarimala. Ayyappan intimidates Mahi and an infuriated Mahi is determined to incapacitate Ayyappan and kidnap the girl. On reaching Pamba, from where they have to walk to reach the shrine, the trio discovers that the police have restricted entry for the remainder of the day as a measure to control the crowd and they will not be able to visit the temple, but an adamant Kallu leaves Ayyappan with no choice except to take a route through the forest.

Mahi's accomplice who has been following them, informs Mahi about their movements, and he sends all of his henchmen to beat up Ayyappan and kidnap Kallu. Ayyappan is alerted of impending danger, where he successfully overpowers Mahi and his people. During the fight, Kallu visualizes Ayyappan as the actual embodiment of the deity Ayyappan and later reveals to him that she has seen him in her dreams, and shows him the drawings she made from them, which shows a man who looks just like Ayyappan. The following day, Ayyappan disappears into the crowd and the kids enter the shrine. As Kallu begins to worry and look for him, he shows up and encourages her to climb the steps to fulfill her father's wish. Later, the police hand the kids over to Unni and they are taken home. Due to the circumstances which followed, the kids believe that he was the deity Ayyappan himself.

It is then revealed that Ayyappan is actually CPO D. Ayyappadas, working at the police station in Pamba. He was alerted of the missing children and knowingly boarded the bus after having seen Kallu's photo. After hearing out their stories, he decided to make their wish come true by visiting the Sabarimala temple. Meanwhile, the police apprehended Mahi and his men, who happened to be on Tamil Nadu criminal records.

== Cast ==
- Unni Mukundan as Ayyappan/ CPO Ayyappadas D
- Deva Nandha as Kalyani / Kallu
- Sreepath as Piyush Unni
- Saiju Kurup as Ajayan
- Alphy Panjikaran as Saumya, Ajayan's Wife and Kallu's Mother
- Sampath Ram as Mahi
- Ramesh Pisharody as Unni
- Abhilash Pillai as Ajayan's Friend
- Manoj K. Jayan as CI Haneef
- Renji Panicker as Chandrappan Pillai, the headmaster of Kallu and Piyoosh's school
- Manohari Joy as Ajayan's Mother and Kallu's Grandmother
- T. G. Ravi as Pattada
- Sreejith Ravi as Ambadi
- Ajay Vasudev as Chettiyar
- Thushara Pillai as Jaya, Ajayan's Sister
- Kalabhavan Jinto as SI
- Aswathy Abhilash as Lakshmi, Kallu and Piyoosh's school teacher

== Production ==
Vishnu Sasi.Sankar announced the film on 23 December 2022 for its theatrical release on 30 December. The principal photography of Malikappuram commenced on 12 September 2022 following a pooja ceremony at Erumely Sree Dharmasastha Temple. K. Ananthagopan, then president of the Travancore Devaswom Board, performed the switch-on ceremony, and S. Sudarshan gave the first clap. Members of the Pandalam royal family had visited the shooting location shortly after it began. The film was shot in places like Konni, Kalleli, Lahai, Pamba, and Sabarimala Temple in Pathanamthitta district and Erumely in Kottayam district. The filming was completed in November 2022.

== Music ==
Malikappuram

Soundtrack album by Ranjin Raj
- Released: 17 December 2022
- Genre: Feature Film Soundtrack
- Label: Anto Joseph Film Company
- Producer: Ranjin Raj

The film score and the songs are composed by Ranjin Raj. The lyrics are written by Santhosh Varma and B.K.Harinarayanan. The album consists of eight songs. The first song "Ganapathi Thunayaruluka" was released on 17 December 2022.

Track listing
No.	Title	Singer(s)	Length
1.	"Kaliyuga"	Ranjin Raj	1:04
2.	"Ayyappan - Intro"	Ranjin Raj	1:07
3.	"Boothanaadha"	Ranjin Raj	1:00
4.	"Ganapathi Thunayaruluka"	Madhu Balakrishnan, Anthony Daasan	3:39
5.	"Harivarasanam"	Prakash Puthoor	5:46
6.	"Ambadi Thumbi"	Vineeth Sreenivasan, Theertha Subash, Vaiga Abhilash	3:11
7.	"Nangeli Poove"	Ranjin Raj	3:46
8.	"Onnam Padi Mele"	Vineeth Sreenivasan	2:00
Total length:			21:33

== Release ==
=== Theatrical ===
The film was censored with a U certificate one week prior to its release. The film was released in theatres on 30 December 2022. Geetha arts bagged the distribution rights for the film in Andhra Pradesh and Telangana. The Telugu and Tamil language dubbed versions were released on 26 January 2023.

=== Home media ===
Malikappuram premiered on Disney+ Hotstar on 15 February 2023 in Malayalam, Hindi, Tamil and Telugu. On the occasion of Vishu, it was shown on Asianet on 15 April 2023. The film ran for more than 40 days post-pandemic. The film also had extended runs in the Gulf Cooperation Council (GCC) nations and the United Kingdom.

== Reception ==
=== Critical reception ===
Malikappuram received positive reviews from critics.

Gopika S of The Times of India gave a rating of 3 out of 5 and wrote that "Unni Mukundan was a good choice for the role and he easily gains a superhero image among the kids. The music by Ranjin Raj is apt for the setting".

Sanjith Sidhardhan of OTT Play rated the film 2.5 out of 5 and wrote, "Malikappuram qualifies as a timepass watch, thanks to its decent second half, elevated by a delightful performance by Unni Mukundan." Mathrubhumi wrote, "Vishnu Narayanan's camera played a huge role in preparing the right frames and the film cannot be complete without talking about the performances of the children who played Kalyani and Piyush."

Meera Manu of News 18 Malayalam wrote "As a maiden film, director Vishnu Shashi Shankar is coming up with a film that will satisfy the core audience, the family audience. The camera and editing departments have done a good job in bringing the film to the screen without being monotonous."

=== Box office ===
Malikappuram, which was made on a budget of ₹3.5 crore (US$360,000), was a commercial success at the box office. It grossed ₹40 crore (US$4.2 million) in the third week and ₹50 crore (US$5.2 million) in the final week of January, becoming a commercial success.

== Accolades ==
Year	Award	Category	Recipient	Ref.
2022	National Film Awards	Best Child Artist	Sreepath Yan	
2022	Kerala Film Critics Association Awards	Best Popular Film	Malikappuram	
2022	Kerala Film Critics Association Awards	Best Child Artist	Deva Nandha	
