= Pathaam Valavu =

- Official Film Poster
- Directed by: M. Padmakumar
- Written by: Abhilash Pillai
- Produced by: Dr. Zacharia Thomas; Gijo Kavanal; Sreejith Ramachandran, Prince Paul; Nitin Keni; Naveen Chandra
- Starring: Suraj Venjaramoodu; Indrajith Sukumaran; Aditi Ravi; Swasika; Ajmal Ameer
- Cinematography: Ratheesh Ram
- Edited by: Shameer Muhammed
- Music by: Ranjin Raj
- Production companies: United Global Media Productions; Mumbai Movie Studios Pvt. Ltd.
- Release date: 13 May 2022
- Running time: 122 Minutes
- Country: India
- Language: Malayalam

Pathaam Valavu (transl. The Tenth Curve) is a 2022 Indian Malayalam language crime thriller drama film directed by M. Padmakumar written by Abhilash Pillai starring Suraj Venjaramoodu in the lead role with Indrajith Sukumaran, Ajmal Ameer, Aditi Ravi,Swasika and Twinkle Joby. The film's script was written by Abhilash Pillai, who also wrote Night Drive (2022) also starring Indrajith Sukumaran. Aditi Ravi plays a mother in the film. Ajmal Ameer returns to Malayalam cinema with this film after a hiatus.

== Plot ==
SI M. Sethunath is eager to go on leave for his wife Suja's delivery. He is 43 and Suja's first two pregnancies were miscarriages. He and his family are extremely worried. On the day when his leave was supposed to start, his superior Shihab Ali asks him to track down and capture Solomon who is out on parole and hasn't returned after his return date. Being an honest and straightforward officer who gives primary importance to duty, he readily takes up the task. Sethu goes to Solomon's house but Solomon runs away. Later in the day, Solomon tries to kill a guy but he's beaten up by the public . Sethu arrives on scene and arrests Solomon.

On the way back to the police station, they halt at a local tea stall due to traffic block. While they were having tea, the teastall owner who knows Solomon very well, narrates his story to the police. He was an orphan and a well loved man in his village. He had fallen in love with a Hindu girl Seetha, and they both had eloped and gotten married. They had a daughter named Lachu. One day during the local church festival, Lachu goes missing. The next day, Lachu's corpse is found, and the postmortem report tells that she was raped before death. The villagers assume that Head Constable Varadhan, who was engaged to Seetha was the culprit as there was a fight between him and Solomon before Lachu"s disappearance. SI Antony asks Varadhan to take time off as only he had a problem with Solomon and everyone is under the impression that he killed Lachu and for that reason villagers might attack him. With a heavy change of heart, Varadhan decided to investigate the case unofficially by himself. He finds out that the culprits are two drug addict youngsters, and they had committed the crime while under influence. Overcome with guilt and being responsible for Lachu's death, Varadhan tells Anthony that he had started a fight with Solomon on the festival and that if he hadn't started it, then Seetha might have been with Lachu. The court acquits the accused due to lack of evidence as the police also helps them.

Seetha tells Solomon that she wants both the culprits to be killed. Solomon kills one of them in front of the court but gets captured by their friends and relatives. Solomon is sent to jail. Now that he is out on parole , he tells Sethu that this would be his only chance to kill the second guy . But Sethu doesn't listen to him and takes him to the jail . Meanwhile, Suja delivers a baby girl.

After Sethu returns from his time off, he visits Solomon in prison. Sethu tells Solomon that he does not have to worry about revenge anymore as the second guy is also dead . Sethu hands over a news paper report of a bike accident in which that youngster was killed. Solomon says that during his last 4 years in prison no God heard him and now if his prayers are answered, then that must be by someone who is also a father of a girl. Sethu silently walks away. In a flashback, it is shown that Sethu had killed that guy by running his official jeep over him after knocking him off from his bike, avenging Lachu's death.

Solomon gets released from jail after serving his term and reunites with Seetha who had been waiting for him.

== Cast ==
- Suraj Venjaramoodu as Solomon
- Indrajith Sukumaran as SI M. Sethunath
- Aditi Ravi as Seetha, Soloman's wife
- Swasika as Suja, Sethu's wife
- Ajmal Ameer as Head Constable Varadhan
- Sudheer Karamana as Father Stephen Koshy
- Kiara Rinku Tomy as Lachu, Soloman's and Seetha's daughter
- Sohan Seenulal as Constable Swami
- Aneesh G. Menon as Constable Satheesh
- Jayakrishnan as SI Antony
- Major Ravi as CI Shihab Ali, Sethunath's superior officer
- Nisthar Ahmed as Xavier
- Abhinav Raj as Jerin Xavier
- Binu Adimali as Constable Charlie
- Shaju Sreedhar as Paul
- Edavela Babu as Ajayan, Anju's father
- Joy John Antony as Mahesh
- Sudheer Paravoor as Kochachan
- Nandhan Unni as Pachu
- Krittika Pradeep as Anitha, Seetha's sister
- Pria Menon as Sethunath's mother
- Thushara Pillai as Seetha's mother
- Anjana Appukuttan as Anju's relative
- Twinkle Joby as sale's girl

== Production and release ==
The film began production in August 2021. The film had its theatrical release on 13 May 2022 and OTT release through ManoramaMAX on 22 July 2022.

== Dubbed versions ==
The film is also available in Hindi & Marathi language dubbed versions currently streaming on Ultra Play & Ultra Jhakaas app respectively.

== Soundtrack ==
Music by Ranjin Raj.

== Reception ==
V. Vinod Nair of The Times of India rated 3/5 and opined that "Patham Valavu can be a one-time watch with an interesting twist". Fair Maithutty of The News Minute wrote that "Pathaam Valavu is underwhelming".
