= Kunjamminis Hospital =

2023 Malayalam film by Sanal V. Devan

- Theatrical release poster
- Directed by: Sanal V. Devan
- Written by: Abhayakumar K.; Anil Kurian
- Produced by: Santhosh Thrivikraman
- Starring: Indrajith; Nyla Usha; Prakash Raj; Baburaj; Sarayu Mohan
- Cinematography: Ajay David Kachappilly
- Edited by: Mansoor Muthutty
- Music by: Ranjin Raj
- Production company: Wow Cinemas
- Distributed by: Wow Cinemas
- Release date: 11 August 2023
- Running time: 134 minutes
- Country: India
- Language: Malayalam

Kunjamminis Hospital is a 2023 Indian Malayalam-language comic fantasy horror film directed by Sanal V. Devan in his directorial debut. Abhayakumar K. and Anil Kurian wrote the screenplay. The film features an ensemble cast, including Indrajith Sukumaran, Nyla Usha, Prakash Raj, Baburaj, Sarayu Mohan, Mallika Sukumaran, Harisree Ashokan, Shari, Binu Pappu, Biju Spoanam, and Alexander Prasanth. It was produced by Santhosh Thrivikraman under the banner of Wow Cinemas.

Principal photography commenced in June 2022 in Irinjalakuda. The songs and background score were composed by Ranjin Raj, while the cinematography and editing were handled by Ajay David Kachappilly and Mansoor Muthutty.

Kunjamminis Hospital was originally scheduled to release on 28 July 2023 but the release was delayed by a fortnight. It was later theatrically released on 11 August 2023 to mixed reviews.

== Cast ==
- Indrajith Sukumaran as Dr. Lyon Ilanjikkaran
- Nyla Usha as Riny Titus
- Prakash Raj as Dr. Chacko
- Baburaj as Maala Varkey
- Sarayu Mohan as Susanna Johny
- Mallika Sukumaran as Reetha Uthup Paalamattom (Ammamachi)
- Harisree Ashokan as Pappachan
- Binu Pappu as Charlie Manjooran
- Biju Spoanam as Fr. Ainickal George
- Alexander Prasanth as Rajan Kartha
- Shari as Dr. Rashmi Balan
- Sarath Das as Dr. Sam Joseph
- Gilu Joseph as Elsy
- Ganga Meera as Kathrina
- Altaf Manaf as Sajimon
- Ashvi Prajith as Aaroshi
- James Eliya
- Sudheer Paravoor
- Unniraj Cheruvathur
- Aradhya Ann

== Production ==
=== Filming ===
Principal photography began on 27 June 2022 with a pooja ceremony held in Irinjalakuda.

=== Marketing ===
The first-look poster was released on 7 January 2023 featuring Indrajith, Nyla Usha, Prakash Raj, Baburaj, and Sarayu Mohan. The second-look poster was unveiled on 2 July 2023.

== Soundtrack ==
Kunjamminis Hospital

Soundtrack album by Ranjin Raj
- Released: 2023
- Genre: Feature film soundtrack
- Length: 11:45
- Language: Malayalam
- Label: T-Series

Ranjin Raj chronology
Within Seconds (2023)	Kunjamminis Hospital (2023)

The film's music is composed by Ranjin Raj, with lyrics written by Vinayak Sasikumar, Santhosh Varma, and B. K. Harinarayanan. The first song, "Ormakalee", sung by Adithya R. K. and written by Sasikumar, was released on 3 July 2023.

Track listing
No.	Title	Lyrics	Singer(s)	Length
1.	"Ormakalee"	Vinayak Sasikumar	Adithya R. K.	3:46
2.	"Akashathalla"	Santhosh Varma	Vidyadharan, Indrajith, Divya S. Menon	4:06
3.	"Nilavuthulli"	B. K. Harinarayanan	Neha Nair, Arvind Venugopal	3:53

== Release ==
=== Theatrical ===
The film was given a U certificate by the Censor Board prior to its release. Initially, the film was planned to be released on 28 July 2023, but later, the release was postponed. It was theatrically released on 11 August 2023.

== Reception ==
=== Critical response ===
Swathi P. Ajith of Onmanorama wrote "While it offers a passable viewing experience, the horror, comedy, and mystery elements failed to meet the anticipated standard, leaving an impression of a poorly crafted plot." Anandu Suresh of The Indian Express wrote "Sanal V. Devan's Kunjamminis Hospital, starring Indrajith Sukumaran, Nyla Usha, and Prakash Raj in key roles, falls short in presenting any noteworthy scenes that stir up emotions, whether they are of horror or comedy." Sajin Shrijith of Cinema Express gave 2.5 out of 5 stars and wrote "Kunjamminis Hospital may appeal more to the sensibilities of kids than the serious-minded moviegoer."
