= Soothrakkaran =

- Theatrical release poster
- Directed by: Anil Rraj
- Written by: Anil Rraj; Wichu Balamurali
- Produced by: Tomy Varghese; Wichu Balamurali
- Starring: Gokul Suresh; Niranj Maniyanpilla Raju; Varsha Bollamma
- Cinematography: Anil Nair
- Edited by: Zian Sreekanth
- Music by: Wichu Balamurali; Saji Raam
- Production company: Smruthi Cinemass
- Distributed by: Magic Frames
- Release date: 8 March 2019
- Country: India
- Language: Malayalam

Soothrakkaran (transl. The tricky man) is a 2019 Indian Malayalam-language action drama film written and directed by Anil Rraj and produced by Tomy Varghese and Wichu Balamurali. Co-written by Wichu Balamurali, the film stars Gokul Suresh, Niranj Maniyanpilla Raju and Varsha Bollamma in lead roles. The music of the film is composed by Wichu Balamurali and the cinematography is handled by Anil Nair. Original background score by 'Saji Ram'. Jacob Gregory, Lalu Alex and Kailash also appear in important roles. The story revolves around a series of murders that happen in a town, and how the family members of Sreedharan (Lalu Alex), Prabhakaran (Vijayaraghavan) and Balachandran (Santhosh Keezhattoor) are entangled in the same. The film was released in India on 8 March 2019.

== Cast ==
- Gokul Suresh as Madathil Aravindan
- Niranj Maniyanpilla Raju as Sreejith Prabhakaran / Sreekuttan
- Varsha Bollamma as Aswathy Balachandran
- Meera Nair as Clara
- Jacob Gregory as Shibu Mon
- Lalu Alex as Madathil Sreedharan
- Vijayaraghavan as Panambil Prabhakaran
- Kailash as Krishnakumar, Prabhakaran's elder son
- Anjana Haridas as Lakshmi Krishnakumar
- Siddique as Minister for Water Resources (Cameo appearance)
- Padmaraj Ratheesh as CI Harish Kurup / Phantom Kurup
- Parvathi T. as Jancy Prabhakaran
- Shammi Thilakan as 'Peppatti' Rajan
- Santhosh Keezhattoor as Balachandran
- Sarayu Mohan
- Gokul Sudhakaran as Vazhipokkan
- Swasika as CI Laura
- S. P. Sreekumar as Film director

== Soundtrack ==
The film features songs composed by debutant Wichu Balamurali and original background score by Saji Ram.

== Release ==
The film was released on 8 March 2019

== Reception ==
The movie was rated 2.5/5 by Deepika Jayaram of The Times of India and concluded that though there are few intriguing incidents in the film that also throw light on a pertinent social issue, the film fails to make an impact as a thriller.
