= Manasvi Kottachi =

Indian child actress

- Born: Chennai, Tamil Nadu, India
- Other names: Baby Manasvi
- Occupation: Child Actress
- Years active: 2018–Present
- Parent: Kottachi (father)

Manasvi Kottachi is an Indian child actress who works in Tamil films.

== Personal life and career ==
Manasvi Kottachi is the daughter of comedian Kottachi, who appeared in supporting comedic roles alongside Vadivelu and Vivek.

She debuted with Imaikkaa Nodigal (2018) after her father's manager saw a video of her on her father's Facebook account. In the film, she played Nayanthara's daughter and gained recognition for her role. She played one of the lead roles in the Malayalam film My Santa (2019) with Dileep. She went on to star in Darbar (2020) and several other films. She played the lead role in the horror film Kanmani Pappa (2022) directed by Sree Mani. Following her performance in Maamanithan (2022), she received an offer to work in a Hindi film.

== Filmography ==
- All films are in Tamil, unless otherwise noted.

†	Denotes films that have not yet been released

Year	Film	Role	Notes
2018	Mohini	Neha	Uncredited role
2018	Imaikkaa Nodigal	Shalini "Shalu" Vikramadithyan	
2019	Suttu Pidikka Utharavu	Ashok's daughter	
2019	Iruttu	Diya Chezhiyan	
2019	My Santa	Isa Elizabeth Jacob	Malayalam film
2020	Darbar	Lilly's Niece	
2021	Paramapadham Vilayattu	Suji	
2021	Vizhuthu	Daughter	short film
2021	Enemy	Pinky	
2021	Chithirai Sevvaanam	Younger Aishwarya	
2022	Maamanithan	Younger Nithya	
2022	Pattampoochi	Rosie	
2022	Maha	Aishwarya (Aishu)	
2022	The Legend	Thulasi's friend	
2022	Kanmani Pappa	Kanmani	
2023	Kolai	Yamini	
2023	DD Returns	Rachel	
2023	Chandramukhi 2	Ranganayaki	
2024	Kozhipannai Chelladurai	Maheshwari	

=== Television ===
Year	Title	Role	Network	Language	Notes	Ref.
2019	Vanakkam Tamizha	Guest	Sun TV	Tamil	Morning Show; With Father Kottachi	
2021- 2022	Super Daddy	Contestant	Vijay Television	Tamil	Reality Game Show; With Father Kottachi	
2024	Mr. and Mrs. Chinnathirai	Guest	Vijay Television	Tamil	Game Show; With Father Kottachi	
