= Deva Nandha =

Indian child actress

- Born: 25 July 2013 (age 13); Aluva, Ernakulam, Kerala, India
- Occupation: Actress
- Years active: 2019 - present
- Parents: Jibin S; Preetha Gopalakrishnan
- Awards: Kerala Film Critics Association Awards

Deva Nandha is an Indian child actress who primarily appears in Malayalam and Tamil-language films. She began her acting career in 2019 and has since portrayed a range of characters in various films. She is known for her roles in Malikappuram (2022), Thottappan (2019), My Santa (2019), Simon Daniel (2022), and Neymar (2023).

== Career ==
She began her acting career in 2019 with a role as the younger version of Sarah in the Malayalam film Thottappan. In 2022, she appeared in the film Malikappuram, portraying the character Kallu/Malikappuram. Her performance in the film received attention from critics, and she was honored with the Best Child Actress award at the Kerala Film Critics Association 2022. Kerala Film Critics Association Awards 2022.

== Filmography ==
- All films are in Malayalam language unless otherwise noted

Key
†	Denotes films that have not yet been released

List of film credits
Year	Title	Role	Notes	Ref.
2019	Thottappan	Sarah (childhood)	Debut film	
2019	My Santa	Anna Theresa		
2021	Minnal Murali	Girl in bus		
2022	Aaraattu			
2022	Heaven	Teena Mathews		
2022	Simon Daniel	Catherine		
2022	The Teacher	Young Devika		
2022	Malikappuram	Kalyani/Kallu	Lead role	
2023	2018	Shaji's daughter		
2023	Neymar	Cloudin		
2023	Salmon 3D	Aavani	Tamil film	
2023	Somante Krithavu	India Soman		
2024	Aranmanai 4	Sakthi	Tamil film	
2024	Gu	Minna		
2025	Sumathi Valavu	Alli		
2026	Kalyanamaram	Mallika		

== Controversy ==
In 2024, Deva Nandha was involved in an incident related to cyberbullying after a modified version of an interview clip from a promotional event was circulated online. The video, which had been edited out of context, prompted a wave of negative responses on social media. In response to the online reactions, her father submitted a complaint to the Ernakulam cyber police, expressing concerns over the spread of misleading content and its potential impact.

== Awards ==
List of film awards received by Deva Nandha
Year	Award	Category	Film
2022	Kerala Film Critics Association Awards 2022	Best Child Artist	Malikappuram
