= Sayanna Varthakal =

- First look poster
- Directed by: Arun Chandu
- Written by: Sachin R. Chandran; Arun Chandu
- Produced by: Mahfoose M. D.; Noushad T.
- Starring: Gokul Suresh; Dhyan Sreenivasan; Aju Varghese; Sharanya Sharma
- Cinematography: Sarath Shaji
- Edited by: Aravind Manmadhan
- Music by: Prashant Pillai; Sankar Sharma
- Production company: D14 Entertainments
- Distributed by: Listin Stephen
- Release date: 5 August 2022
- Country: India
- Language: Malayalam

Sayanna Varthakal (transl. Evening news) is a 2022 Indian Malayalam-language black comedy crime film co-written and directed by Arun Chandu and produced by D14 Entertainments. Co-written by Sachin R. Chandran and Rahul Menon, the film stars Gokul Suresh and newcomer Sharanya Sharma in lead roles.

The music of the film is composed by Prashant Pillai and Sankar Sharma, while the cinematography is handled by Sarath Shaji. It is reported that the movie tells the tale of a film actor and his life in a government-affiliated organisation. The film was released theatrically on 5 August 2022.

== Plot ==
Upon falling prey to the malpractices of the government's dark side, Ravi Kumar reveals his plight to the world. However, his actions soon invite trouble in his life.

== Cast ==
- Gokul Suresh as Ravi Kumar
- Dhyan Sreenivasan as Dennis Varghese
- Aju Varghese as Jithu Joseph
- Sharanya Sharma as Sithara
- Dinesh Prabhakar as Pavithran
- Indrans as Raghavan
- Irshad as Rajeev
- Vijayaraghavan as Varghese, Dennis' father
- Makarand Deshpande as Mangesh Pandey
- Vishnu Govindan as Lazar
- Anand Manmadhan as Anand
- Jeril Varghese as Jerry
- Radhadevi as Oviya

== Production ==
Sayanna Varthakal is the 2nd directorial attempt of Arun Chandu who was a former associate of director Vineeth Sreenivasan. During an interview to The New Indian Express Arun said, "Sayanna Varthakal is a media-related story and the title is actually a reference to the title of the media channel run by Dennis (Dhyan Sreenivasan). Gokul Suresh plays the character Ravi Kumar, a government employee who crosses paths with Dennis." Sayanna Varthakal began its principal photography in late June 2018, and it was shot in various locations, including Ernakulam, Kolkata and Nepal border.

== Soundtrack ==
The film features original background score and songs composed by Prashant Pillai.
