= Pariwar =

2025 Indian Malayalam-language film

- Theatrical release poster
- Directed by: Ulsav Rajeev & Fahad Nandu
- Written by: Ulsav Rajeev & Fahad Nandu
- Story by: Ulsav Rajeev & Fahad Nandu
- Produced by: Sajeev P K Anne Sajeev
- Starring: Jagadish; Indrans; Rajendran; Alexander Prasanth
- Cinematography: Alfas Jahangeer
- Edited by: V.S. Vishal
- Music by: Bijibal
- Release date: 7 March 2025 (India)
- Country: India
- Language: Malayalam

Pariwar is a 2025 Indian Malayalam-language comedy drama film written & directed by Ulsav Rajeev & Fahad Nandu. The film features Jagadish, Indrans, Rajendran and Alexander Prasanth in the lead roles, with a supporting cast that includes Unni Nair, Sohan Seenulal, Rishikesh, Pramod Veliyanad, Aswath Lal and Unnimaya Naalppadam . The film was produced under the banner of Fragrant Nature Film Creations.

== Plot ==
The film focuses on humour and portrays the problems that arise in a family, the attempts to resolve them, and the eventful moments that ensue. It also depicts 2 brothers fighting over a ring of dead person to get money

== Cast ==
- Jagadish as Sahadevan
- Indrans as Bheeman
- Rajendran as Gold Raja
- Alexander Prasanth as Nakulan
- Rishikesh as Arjunan
- Unni Nair as Bhaskara Pillai
- Meenaraj Palluruthy as Keshavan
- Sohan Seenulal
- Pramod Veliyanad
- Aswath Lal
- Unnimaya Naalppadam

== Production ==
The film is produced by Fragrant Nature Film Creations. Cinematography was handled by Alfas Jahangeer, editing by V.S. Vishal, and the musical score was composed by National Film Award winner Bijibal and lyrics by Santhosh Varma.

== Soundtrack ==
The music for Pariwar was composed by Bijibal.

== Release ==
The movie was released in theatres on 7 March 2025.

== Reception ==
Anjana George of The Times of India rated the film 3 out of 5 stars and wrote, "a simple, entertaining watch—ideal for those who enjoy family dramas that blend humour with an honest look at human nature. It may not rewrite the rules of cinema, but it proves that a well-told story doesn’t need crime or chaos to hold its audience." Swathi P. Ajith of Onmanorama wrote, "What makes 'Pariwar' stand out is how familiar its characters feel, each one resembles someone we've known at some point, making them instantly relatable. The film keeps things simple, never trying to be grand or over-the-top, yet delivers what it promises."
