= Alexander Prasanth =

Indian actor

Prasanth Alexander
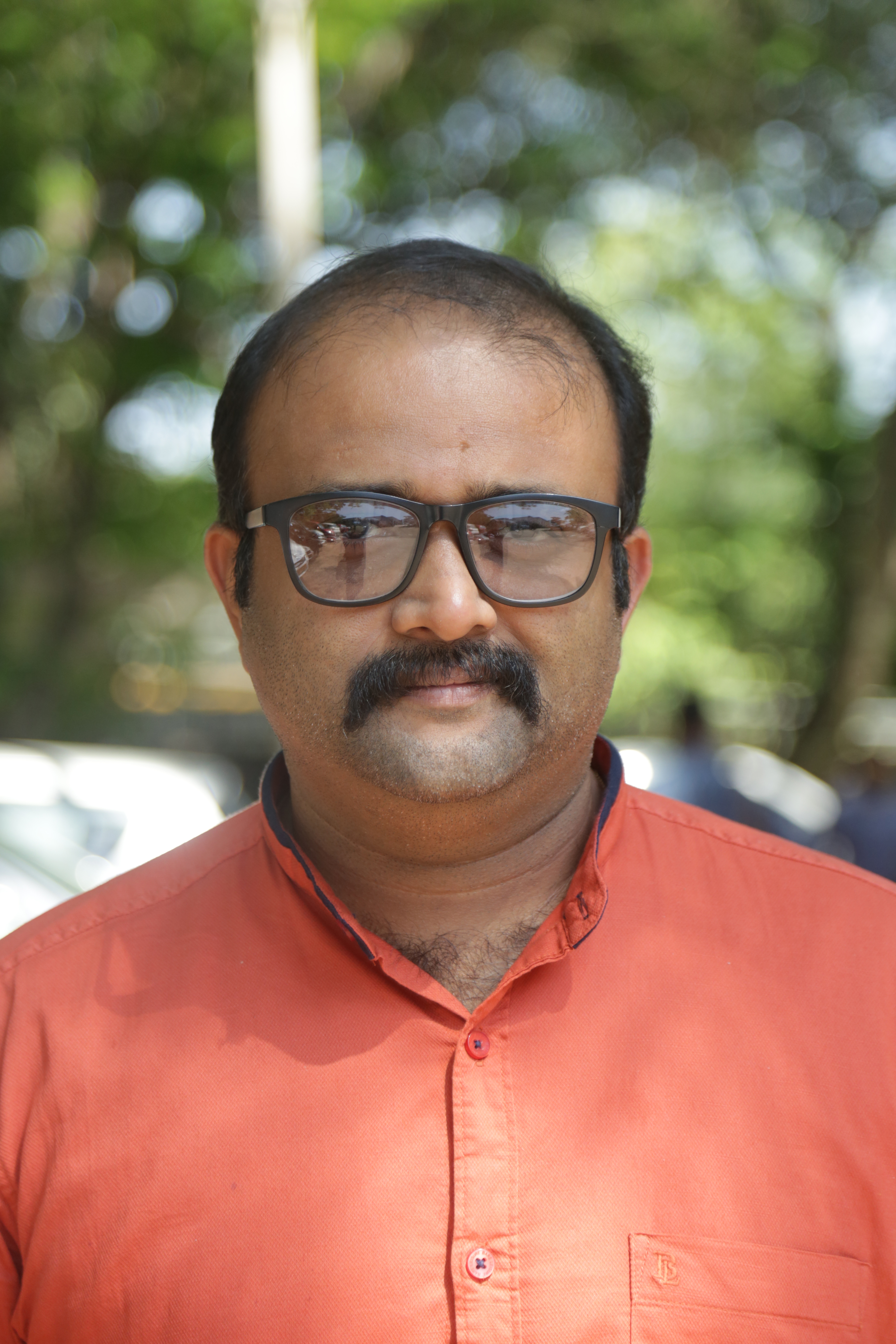
- Prasanth in 2019
- Born: Prasanth Alexander; Thiruvalla, Kerala, India
- Other name: Alexander Prasanth
- Occupations: Actor; casting director; creative director
- Years active: 2002–present
- Spouse: Sheeba
- Children: 2

Alexander Prasanth is an Indian actor and producer who primarily appears in Malayalam films. He made his debut through the 2002 movie Nammal. Prasanth is known for portraying the lead role of Sebastian in Purusha Pretham - Male Ghost.

== Career ==
Prasanth began his career as an anchor of Crazy Records on Asianet. He made his acting debut in 2002 with Kamal's film Nammal. Prasanth later acted in several minor and character roles in more than 50 Malayalam movies. He did notable roles in the films like Ordinary, Best Actor, Oru Murai Vanthu Parthaya, Ira, The Great Father, Johny Johny Yes Appa etc. Movies like Action Hero Biju and Operation Java gave him a new lease on his film career. He made his Hindi film debut in 2019 for Rajkumar Gupta's India's Most Wanted, playing the role of South Indian Intelligence Officer Pillai. He has also worked as the creative director for the film Race.

== Personal life ==
He was born to Rev. K. P. Alexander and Leelamma. Prasanth completed his education from Mar Thoma College, Tiruvalla and Kodaikanal Christian College. He is married to Sheeba K. Jacob, an assistant professor at Mar Thoma College, Tiruvalla.

== Filmography ==
=== Films ===
Key
†	Denotes films that have not yet been released

- All films are in Malayalam language unless otherwise noted.

Year	Title	Role	Notes
2002	Nammal	Benny	
2004	Koottu	Ratheesh	
2005	Annorikkal	Haridas	
2006	Achanurangatha Veedu	Tomichan	
2006	Palunku	The Seller	
2006	Pothan Vava	TV Reporter	
2007	Detective	Villager	
2007	Soorya Kireedam	Vivek	
2008	College Kumaran	Aby	
2008	Mulla	Tamil Director	
2009	Changathikkoottam	Madhav	
2009	Nammal Thammil	College Student	
2010	Best Actor	Co-director	
2011	Bombay March 12	Terrorist	
2011	Swapna Sanchari	Reporter	
2012	Ordinary	Jeep Driver	
2013	Players (film)	Niseer	
2013	Lisammayude Veedu	Tomichan Muthalali	
2013	Hotel California	Loyid	
2013	God for Sale	Comrade	
2013	Crocodile Love Story	Managing Director	
2013	101 Chodyangal		
2013	Kalimannu	Advocate	
2014	Konthayum Poonoolum		
2014	Praise The Lord		
2014	Avatharam	Jamal	
2014	The Dolphins		
2016	Action Hero Biju	Jose Pottakkuzhy	
2016	Ithu Thaanda Police	David Xavier	
2016	Oru Murai Vanthu Parthaya	Kuriachan	
2016	Kavi Uddheshichathu..?	Shaji	
2016	10 Kalpanakal		
2017	The Great Father	Johnny	
2017	Puthan Panam		
2017	Adventures of Omanakuttan	Varadan	
2017	Avarude Raavukal	Buji Pattavayal	
2017	Chicken Kokkachi	Pappan	
2017	Ayaal Sashi	MLA	
2017	Kadamkadha	Subash	
2017	Thrissivaperoor Kliptham		
2017	Ramaleela		
2017	Sherlock Toms	Joby Tharakan	
2018	Kaly		
2018	Kunju Daivam	Jobichan	
2018	Ira	Varun	
2018	Oraayiram Kinaakkalaal		
2018	Velakkaari Aayirunthaalum En Mohavalli		
2018	Oru Kuttanadan Blog	Poly	
2018	Johny Johny Yes Appa	Priest	
2019	Madhura Raja	MLA Cleetus	
2019	Mask	Najeeb	
2019	India's Most Wanted	Rudra Pillai	Hindi film
2019	Shubharathri	Salam	
2019	Safe	Cyber cell officer	
2019	King Fish	Adv. Kuruvila	
2020	Shylock	Broker Kumar	
2021	Vrithakrithiyilulla Chathuram	S. I.	
2021	One	Jose, MLA Opposition	
2021	Operation Java	Basheer	
2021	Mohan Kumar Fans	Shivan	
2021	Anugraheethan Antony	Francis	
2021	Oru Thathvika Avalokanam		
2022	Night Drive	Praanchi	
2022	Adithattu	Srank Raayan	
2022	Aviyal	Sebastian	
2022	CBI 5: The Brain	CBI Officer Sudhi Nair	
2022	Aarattu	Panchayat Vice President	
2022	Twenty One Gms	CI Sreenivas	
2022	Puzhu	Jamal	
2022	Four	Dominic Sir	
2022	King Fish	Adv. Kuruvilla	
2022	Vivaha Avahanam	Prabhakaran	
2022	Nalam Mura	S.I. Raneesh	
2023	Maheshum Marutiyum		
2023	Purusha Pretham	Super Sebastian	Released on SonyLIV
2023	Kolla	Aliyan	
2023	Pappachan Olivilanu	C.P.O Jameskutty	
2023	Kunjamminis Hospital	Rajan Kartha	
2024	Turbo	CI Davis	
2024	Partners		
2024	Gumasthan	Sandeep	
2024	Manasa Vacha		
2024	Oru Anweshanathinte Thudakkam		
2024	Pani	Kuruvila	
2024	Extra Decent	Shibu	
2024	Abraham Ozler	Dr. Salam	
2025	Maruvasham		
2025	Sarkeet	Pothan	
2025	ID – The Fake		
2025	Pariwar	Nakulan	
2025	Maranamass	Tiger Sam	
2026	Spa		
2026	Prakambanam	MN Santhosh	
2026	Pallichattambi	Trustee Devassy	
2026	Mollywood Times	Vineeth's father	
2027	Operation Cambodia	TBA	

=== Web series ===
Year	Title	Role	Language	Notes
2024	Nagendran's Honeymoons	Soman	Malayalam	Disney+ Hotstar

=== As an anchor ===
Year	Program	Role	channel	Notes
2002	Crazy Records	Anchor	Asianet	Campus Gameshow
2002-2008	Valkkannadi	Anchor, Asst Producer	Asianet	Family Gameshow
2005-2006	Bubblegum	Anchor	JaiHind TV	
2008-2010	Box Office	anchor	Surya TV	
2016	Star Challenge	Associate Producer	Flowers TV	
