= Amrutham (film) =

2004 film by Sibi Malayil

- Directed by: Sibi Malayil
- Written by: K Girish Kumar
- Starring: Jayaram; Arun; Padmapriya; Bhavana; Nedumudi Venu; Jagathy Sreekumar
- Cinematography: Venugopalan
- Edited by: L.Bhoominathan
- Music by: M Jayachandran; Johnson (Background score)
- Production company: Magic Magic Cinemas
- Release date: 24 December 2004
- Country: India
- Language: Malayalam

Amrutham (transl. Ambrosia) is a 2004 Indian Malayalam family drama directed by Sibi Malayil, starring Jayaram, Arun, Padmapriya, and Bhavana in the lead roles. The film also stars Nedumudi Venu, Jagathy Sreekumar, and KPAC Lalitha.

== Plot ==
Gopi and Dinesh are brothers. Gopi is a farmer who works hard to give his brother a good education after their father deserts them when Dinesh is just a child.

Dinesh, now a final-year degree student, is involved in college politics and also seeing the daughter of a local teashop owner, played by Bhavana. Gopi is in a relationship with a Muslim girl, Sainaba. All hell breaks loose when Gopi marries Sainaba and brings her home.

== Cast ==
- Jayaram as Gopinathan Nair
- Arun as Dineshan Nair
- Padmapriya as Sainaba
- Bhavana as Mridula
- Nedumudi Venu as Ravunni Nair
- KPAC Lalitha as Sarojini
- Jagathy Sreekumar as Chandy
- Mamukkoya as Aimoottikka
- T. G. Ravi as Divakaran
- Vishnu Unnikrishnan as Anthakedu
- Sreekala as Thaha
- Sudhi Joshi as Ashraf

== Soundtrack ==
Amrutham's songs and background score were composed by M Jayachandran. The lyrics were written by Kaithapram Damodaran Namboothiri. The music album has five songs:

| Track | Song title | Singer(s) |
|---|---|---|
| 1 | "O Sainaba" | Dr. K. J. Yesudas, K. S. Chithra |
| 2 | "Ishtam Ishtam" | K. S. Chithra |
| 3 | "Muthe Ninne" | Madhu Balakrishnan, Sujatha Mohan |
| 4 | "Yamunayum" | G. Venugopal |
| 5 | "Ishtam Ishtam" | M. G. Sreekumar |
| 6 | "Yamunayum" (female) | Binni Krishnakumar |

== Reception ==
A critic from Sify wrote, "After seeing the film one wonders what prompted a director like Sibi Malayil to make such outdated story into a film that crawls even though it is only two hours! On the whole Amritham is a dud from the word go!"
