= Iruttu =

2019 film by V. Z. Durai

- Theatrical release poster
- Directed by: V. Z. Durai
- Written by: V. Z. Durai; Indra Soundar Rajan (dialogues)
- Screenplay by: V. Z. Durai
- Story by: V. Z. Durai
- Produced by: Sundar Arumugam; Parthasarathi Gokulyadav
- Starring: Sundar C Sakshi Choudhary; Dhansika; VTV Ganesh
- Cinematography: E. Krishnasamy
- Edited by: R. Sudharsan
- Music by: Girishh G.
- Production company: Screen Scene Media Entertainment
- Distributed by: Lyca Productions
- Release date: 6 December 2019 (India)
- Running time: 132 minutes
- Country: India
- Language: Tamil
- Budget: ₹7 crore
- Box office: ₹21 crore

Iruttu (transl. Dark) is a 2019 Indian supernatural horror thriller film written and directed by V. Z. Durai. It stars Sundar C, Sakshi Choudhary and Dhansika in the lead roles and Vimala Raman, VTV Ganesh, Yogi Babu, and Manasvi Kottachi in supporting roles. Girishh G. composed the film's music and cinematography was handled by E. Krishnasamy. The film had its theatrical release on 6 December 2019 and opened to generally mixed-to-positive reviews. It was later dubbed in Hindi and released under the title Qatil Saya (transl. Killer Shadow) Iruttu is a loose adaptation of the 2016 South Korean film The Wailing (2016) by Na Hong-Jin

== Plot ==
In Hillstation Sigapurahali at noon, a black figure is seen walking. Six men are killed by an unseen force in hora grass. Police arrive to investigate. Officer Palraj explains to a superior officer there are no traces of evidence at the scene of the crime.

All the victims' neck bones have been shattered but there are no signs of a handprint or murder weapon. Palraj continues to investigate the crime scene; he seems to find a clue. When Constable Kulandaisamy arrives at the SP Office, he finds a woman trying to immolate herself. Kulandaisam and the female constables calm down the woman. At that moment, ominous chanting and whispering sounds are heard.

Police officer Chezhiyan (Sundar C) along with his wife Regina (Sakshi Choudhary) and daughter Diya (Manasvi Kottachi), relocate to the hill station. On the way, the family have a picnic. Their pet dog, Danny, runs into the forest. Chezhiyan finds Danny but Regina feels this is a bad omen for a new start.

Chezhiyan and his family encounter bizarre events. Constable Kulandaisamy helps the family to settle down in a rented house. Chezhiyan notes all of the windows and furniture are made entirely of steel; Kulandaisamy states this is because wooden items were all destroyed by termites. Diya explores the new house and find a large mirror covered in cloth. While checking the reflection, Diya senses a cloth-covered mannequin is moving. As Regina starts preparing a meal, she hears a tapping noise and scolds Diya to stop making it. She finds the noise is coming from the window; she opens it and hundreds of crows crowd their window, scaring them both.

Constable Kulandaisamy returns to the police station, where he receives a phone call in which a woman cries for help and calls his name. He learns the phone had been out of order for the past two days and discusses the incident with his colleagues.

Panicked, they call to Chezhiyan. Chezhiyan and Regina try to have sex and see an old man in rags standing outside their window. The old man will not talk but one of his constables arrives and states the old man is harmless and mentally unwell. Chezhiyan returns to his wife when he gets Kulandaisamy's call for help. He reluctantly leaves for the station to check on his distressed colleagues. In his absence, Regina becomes disturbed when the music system randomly plays music. She unplugs it and turns it around but it plugs itself back in and starts playing music again. Regina tries to sleep but Diya stands at the end of the bed, jumping on her and biting off her neck. Regina wakes up screaming to realize it was a dream.

Chezhiyan calms his colleagues and calls the telephone department to trace the call. In the morning, he gathers information about the killings with the help of Kulandaisamy. He finds the Hillstation has a peculiar name Sigarpurhali of Arabic origin; it is believed to be an ancient Arabic settlement where Arabs used to practice magic. Kulandaisamy also states an Arabic magic practitioner lives alone atop of the hill and is often seen with the ragged old man. Chezhiyan wishes to meet him while Kulandaisamy warns him not to. The practitioner is seen praying and chanting but leaves his home when Cheziyan comes to investigate.

Cheziyan returns home and is seduced by Regina. After having sex with her, he searches for his phone to find missed calls from Kulandai. When he calls back, news reports stating a panic call to the station had come from his home's landline, leaving him confused because he was home at the time. Immediately, he gets a call from Regina's mobile. He answers it and finds Regina left early from home to drop the child at school and go shopping. He is even more baffled as moments ago, he had sex with Regina. He visits the supermarket, cross-checks the CCTV and confirms that Regina was not with him at home that morning. He discusses his worries with Kulandai and then corners the magician outside his home. As he confronts the magician, the magician knows the black woman has entered Cheziyan's home and warns him she is Sila and is not of this world or human. The Magician needs to chant prayers 4,440 times before dawn to keep her at bay.

Meanwhile, Regina gets to school to pick up Diya; they discuss school events when Diya realizes she is alone and turns back to see Sila in black. As she enquires about her mother, Sila bends down to lick Diya's cheeks. At the moment, the real Regina parks her car and goes in search of Diya. Again the Hill plunges into darkness, panicking them all. Cheziyan gets the help of his Muslim colleague and gets in touch with Muslim high priest to know the prayer times. Hysterical, Regina calls Cheziyan to tell him Diya is petrified and has odd rashes on her body, and demands he go to the hospital right then. Cheziyan reaches the hospital to find Regina in tears and Diya in pain. As the doctor treats her, she gets a call from home and attends it, only to hear the hysterical voice of Regina relating Diya's rashes when she is standing in front of him. He decides he would keep Regina and Diya in hospital safely and investigate the imposter Regina but they accompany him home. While Regina puts Diya to bed and changes clothes, Sila watches them, roams the house and sniffs Cheziyan's scent. Cheziyan realizes Sila's presence by the movement of his leather jacket. Regina and Cheziyan eat dinner in silence when they hear Diya scream. As they rush to Diya's help they find Diya scooting to the corner of the room, not letting Cheziyan touch her. She points to the windows where the ragged old man is chanting prayers and spraying water around the house and windows. Cheziyan beats the old man and throws him out. Sila is hanging on the windowsill.

The old man tells the magician he has warded off Sila from the house but cannot get rid of her and the magician's prayers before dawn must control Sila. He starts to pray until dawn but hears the screams of the old man and finds a demonized Sila dragging off the old man. His phone rings, bringing Sila's attention to him. She starts pursuing the magician, who tries to return to his house but cannot open the door. At dawn, his home's door burst opens and pulls him in. He sees another demon in white inside the house and she kills him.

Later on that morning, Cheziyan and other police find the magician impaled on a tree and eaten by termites, and deduces the magician was murdered a few hours ago. He requests the forensic team to collect every blood sample around the spot. Cheziyan while investigating the forensic photos, finds a weird scratch that reads "16:113" on the magician's body. Forensics report two different blood samples from the murder spot; one is the magician's and the other is a rare blood group called "Bombay Blood group", which and only a very specific set of people born in Maharashtra and Gujarat have. Cheziyan narrows down his suspect from the list of people with this rare blood group to a woman who has unusually signed in Arabic. He takes a printout of her photo and cross-checks it with his Diya.

Diya turns hysterical when she sees the photo, confirming the woman in the photo is Sila. He sends Regina and Diya to another house and requests Kulandai to change the bed sheets with the sheet that was present when he had sex with Sila. The police dog is used to find Sila's hideout in the forest. Searching for a link between an Arabic woman born in Maharashtra or Gujarat with a hill station in the South, he finds a verse in the Quran, 4:16, and checks for verse 16:113.

As per the verse, he finds a Muslim priest who explain the existence of Sila (evil Jinn) and humans, and how six Silas were killed at their weakest time by humans; the Silas vowed to plunge the place in darkness In their next birth. All 5 of them born as hora grass, termite, fish, dog and snake. Only one of them was born as human child and escaped from in Gujarat earthquake. A Gujarati women was one of the Silas who vowed to bring all her sisters back to human form by killing her unborn child and Diya to gain ultimate power. Cheziyan saves Regina and Diya and Sila gets finally killed.

== Cast ==
- Sundar C as Inspector Chezhiyan aka Chelli aka Sivabalan aka Ghost Rider
- Sakshi Choudhary as Regina Chezhiyan
- Dhansika as Jinn Sila
- VTV Ganesh as Head Constable Kulandhaivel
- Vimala Raman as Jinn Shaika
- Manasvi Kottachi as Diya Chezhiyan; Chezhiyan's daughter
- Yogi Babu as House Broker Vanangamudi
- Shaji Chen as Muslim Sage
- Rajasimman as Mouliyaar

== Production ==
Director V. Z. Durai announced Iruttu, his seventh effort, after the release of Yemaali in 2018. The first poster was released in October 2018 with a picture of Sundar C in the role of a policeman. The director hired actor-director Sundar C as the male lead while C was directing Vantha Rajavathaan Varuven. Filming took place in Ooty.

== Music ==
Iruttu

Soundtrack album by Girishh G
- Recorded: 2019
- Genre: Feature film soundtrack
- Label: Sony Music
- Producer: Girishh G

Girishh G chronology
Pakshi (2019)	Iruttu (2019)	Mookuthi Amman (2020)

The film's soundtrack was composed by Girishh G. and lyrics were written by Mohanrajan. The audio rights are with Sony Music.

== Awards and nominations ==
Year	Award	Category	Recipient(s) and nominee(s)	Result	Ref.
2019	Ananda Vikatan Cinema Awards	Best Villain - Female	Sai Dhanshika	Won	
2019	Ananda Vikatan Cinema Awards	Best Child Artist	Manasvi Kottachi	Nominated	
2020	Osaka Tamil International Film Festival Awards	Best Cinematographer	E. Krishnasamy	Won	
