= Within Seconds =

2023 Malayalam film

- Theatrical release poster
- Directed by: Vijesh P. Vijayan
- Written by: Sangeeth Dharmmarajan; Vijesh P. Vijayan
- Produced by: Sangeeth Dharmmarajan
- Starring: Indrans; Sudheer Karamana; Alencier Ley Lopez; Siddique; Thalaivasal Vijay; Sarayu Mohan; Santhosh Keezhattoor
- Cinematography: Rajeesh Raman
- Edited by: Ayoob Khan
- Music by: Ranjin Raj
- Production company: Ball Entertainment
- Distributed by: Tantra Media
- Release date: 2 June 2023
- Running time: 123 minutes
- Country: India
- Language: Malayalam

Within Seconds is a 2023 Indian Malayalam-language crime thriller film directed by Vijesh P. Vijayan. The film stars Indrans in the lead role, alongside Sudheer Karamana, Alencier Ley Lopez, Siddique, Thalaivasal Vijay, Sarayu Mohan and Santhosh Keezhattoor in supporting cast.

Principal photography commenced in January 2021 in Punalur. The music was composed by Ranjin Raj, while the cinematography and editing were handled by Rajeesh Raman and Ayoob Khan.

Within Seconds was released in theatres on 2 June 2023.

== Cast ==
- Indrans as Kizhangu Mohanan
- Alencier Ley Lopez as Kalan Thambi
- Sudheer Karamana as LTT.Ganeshan
- Thalaivasal Vijay as Don
- Santhosh Keezhattoor as Njeezhur Vakeel
- Siddique as Minister Sadhanandhan
- Narayanankutty as Mammath
- Sarayu Mohan as Nisha
- Seema G. Nair as Leelaamma
- Neena Kurup
- Sunil Sukhada as Sresh Annan
- Anu Nair
- Aneesh as Gopu Meshiri
- Bagio George as Bagio
- Dr. Sangeeth Dharmarajan as Commissioner Sam Alex
- Deepu as Bumper Reji
- JP Manacaud as Paster Sunny
- Saantino Mohan as Alanto
- Sebin Eluvathingal as Faris
- Shambhu as Chindan
- Master Arjun Sangeeth as Nandhu
- Master Arjun as Chinnan
- Master Sanjay as Unnikuttan

== Production ==
The film is produced by Sangeeth Dharmmarajan under the banner of Ball Entertainment. Principal photography began in the first week of January 2021 in Punalur. The film was shot in Kollam, Punalur, Kulathupuzha, Aryankavu and Thenmala.

== Music ==
Within Seconds

Soundtrack album by Ranjin Raj
- Released: 2023
- Genre: Feature film soundtrack
- Length: 8:35
- Language: Malayalam
- Label: Saregama

Ranjin Raj chronology
Kallanum Bhagavathiyum (2023)	Within Seconds (2023)	Kunjamminis Hospital (2023)

The songs and background score were composed by Ranjin Raj. Anil Panachooran's lyrics were also featured for the final time in the film.

Track listing
No.	Title	Lyrics	Singer(s)	Length
1.	"Kasthoori Kattoothi"	Anil Panachooran	M.G. Sreekumar, Ranjin Raj	2:47
2.	"Akasham Thottu"	Dr. Sangeeth	Niranj Suresh	2:50
3.	"Velavane Velayudhane"	Murukeshan	Murukeshan	2:58

== Release ==
=== Theatrical ===
The film was initially scheduled to release on 12 May 2023. The release date was later postponed and it was released in theaters on 2 June 2023.

== Controversies ==
Following the film's release on 2 June 2023, an issue arose at the Vanitha-Vineeta theatre premise in Edappally regarding a negative review given by Santosh Varkey. According to the reports, he was assaulted by a group of people outside the theatre following his comments on the film.
