= Ira (film) =

- Theatrical release poster
- Directed by: Saiju S. S.
- Written by: Naveen John
- Produced by: Vysakh; Udaykrishna
- Starring: Unni Mukundan; Gokul Suresh
- Cinematography: Sudheer Surendran
- Edited by: Johnkutty
- Music by: Gopi Sundar
- Production company: Vysakh Udaykrishna Productions
- Distributed by: UK Studios
- Release date: 16 March 2018
- Country: India
- Language: Malayalam

Ira (transl. Victim) is a 2018 Indian Malayalam-language crime thriller film directed by Saiju S. S., written by Naveen John, and produced by Vysakh and Udaykrishna under the banner of Vysakh Udaykrishna Productions, and distributed by Udaykrishna. It stars Unni Mukundan and Gokul Suresh with Miya and Niranjana in supporting roles.

Principal photography began on 1 November 2017. The film was released in India on 16 March 2018 and was a success at the box office.

== Plot ==
Aryan (Gokul Suresh) is a doctor whose is in love interest with Jennifer (Niranjana Anoop). He is arrested by for the murder of Jennifer's grandfather Minister Chandy (Alencier Ley Lopez), but claims he is innocent and wrongly accused. His life changes when Rajeev Devaraj (Unni Mukundan), the central police officer investigating his case, comes into it.

Rajeev investigates thoroughly to find that Aryan, who was new to the city, was appointed in a leading hospital as per recommendation from a priest who was close to its owner. Jennifer's father Jacob (Shankar Ramakrishnan) and her mother Daisy (Lena), a brilliant criminal lawyer had been separated. Rajeev makes a detailed account of all events on the day of Chandy's death. The cause of death was allegedly a deadly chemical which was found in his body. Rajeev meets Aryan in jail and assures him that he would be set free if he is innocent.

Later, Rajeev meets Jenny and narrates a different story, which starts off with Rajeev and his assistant Venkidi being handed over the investigation of a case regarding tribal families in a forest village. He meets a girl Karthika (Miya George) and, after a set of funny events, falls in love with her. However, he understands that Karthika is none other than the famous journalist Vaigha Devi, who deals with social crimes against tribal people. A factory which produced illegal medicines had been testing these on the village people with the help of Bhadran, a rowdy. Rajeev understands more of these issues before his investigation ends. Later, Karthika wishes to open up to Rajeev on her love. However, at the meeting place, she is welcomed by Chandy,Jacob Chandy and Bhadran. It is revealed that Chandy is the one behind illegal medicine production for the village. Karthika has personal vendetta towards Chandy as he murdered her parents. She is stabbed by Jacob and left to die and is subsequently brutally raped by Bhadran. Rajeev, who arrives later, finds her murdered, and attempts to take her to the hospital but gets severely bludgeoned on head by Bhadran and becomes unconscious after witnessing Karthika's last breath.

Rajeev, who ends his flashback, tells to a shattered Jenny that her father might have accused the innocent Aryan so that he can create an emotional note about Chandy's death. Jenny goes back to Daisy and apologizes for hating her. In the court session, Daisy brilliantly proves that Aryan is innocent and bails him out, also proving that Jacob has purposefully accused Aryan with the help of a corrupt Police Commissioner Satheesh Varma. Later, Jacob's car suffers anonymous gunshots, which arouses curiosities. Rajeev is called to Jacob's guest house situated on an island, wherein Jacob tells him that he had kidnapped Aryan also. He had planned to kill both of them so as to create a new story and deceive the public. Rajeev laughs at him and reveals certain things unknown to Jacob.

In a major twist, it turns out that Chandy was actually murdered by Aryan with the help of Rajeev. Rajeev reveals that on the day of the murder, he, in the disguise of a male nurse, had replaced the injection drug meant for Chandy with a life-threatening one so that the Chandy would be injected by it. After revealing these facts to a terror stricken Jacob, Rajeev also tells him that the murder was done to avenge the murder of Karthika, who was also Aryan's elder sister. After revealing all the truths, Rajeev kills Jacob and saves Aryan. Aryan escapes, and Rajeev meets a few journalists and tells them about Chandy's murder. Jacob's murder case is handed over to Rajeev as he claims that he is the only one to have spotted the killer.

The film ends with Rajeev and Aryan all set to kill Bhadran who bludgeoned Rajeev and Murdered Karthika.

== Cast ==
- Unni Mukundan as DCP Rajeev Devaraj IPS
- Gokul Suresh as Dr. Aryan, Karthika's younger brother
- Shanker Ramakrishnan as Jacob Chandy
- Alencier Ley Lopez as Minister K.P.Chandy
- Miya George as Karthika / Vaigha Devi, Rajeev's love interest and Aryan's sister
- Niranjana Anoop as Jennifer Jacob, Aryan's love interest
- Mareena Michael Kurisingal as Kavya
- Lena as Adv. Daisy Jacob
- Neeraja Das as Thara, Nurse
- Kailash as Commissioner Satheesh John IPS
- Remya Panicker as Vani
- Nelson as Police constable Venkidi
- Alexander Prasanth as Dr. Varun Nambiar
- Prem Prakash as IG Ajay Chacko IPS
- Saju Navodaya as Rameshan, Taxi driver
- Srikant Murali as Dr. V.K Madhavan
- E.A.Rajendran as Advocate
- Balachandran Chullikadu as Judge
- Jayan Cherthala as Father Dominic
- Sanuja Soman as Nurse Anu
- Nirmal Palazhi as SI Sugunan
- Manju Satheesh as Dr. Malavika Nambiar
- Rahul Rajagopal as CI Philip Koshy
- Sundarapandiyan as Bhadran
- Dinesh Panicker as Doctor
- Majeed as Doctor
- Dinesh Kollappally as Punnoose (Minister's PA).
- Vinod Kedamangalam as Kapyar
- Kottayam Rasheed as Thara's father
- Baby Kezia as Kalyani

== Soundtrack ==
The film's original songs were composed by Gopi Sundar:

No.	Title	Performer(s)	Length
1.	"Etho Pattin Eenam"	Vijay Yesudas and Sithara Krishnakumar	4:03
2.	"Oru Mozhi Parayaam"	Vijay Yesudas and Mridula Warrier	4:27

== Production ==
The film is the first production of director Vysakh and writer Udaykrishna under their production house Vysakh Udaykrishna Productions. It was directed by Saiju S. S., who dubbed for Mukundan's voice in his debut film Bombay March 12. Saiju was a former associate director to Vysakh.

Principal photography began on 1 November 2017. Sudheer Surendran was in charge of the cinematography.

== Release ==
The film was released on 16 March 2018 in India.
