= Gu (film) =

- Theatrical release poster
- Directed by: Manu Radhakrishnan
- Written by: Manu Radhakrishnan
- Produced by: Maniyanpilla Raju
- Starring: Saiju Kurup; Deva Nandha
- Cinematography: Chandrakanth Madhavan
- Edited by: Vinayan M J
- Music by: Johnathan Bruce
- Production company: Maniyanpilla Raju Productions
- Release date: 17 May 2024
- Country: India
- Language: Malayalam

Gu is an Indian Malayalam language psycho emotional Drama with horror and fantasy elements written and directed by Manu Radhakrishnan. The film is produced by Maniyanpilla Raju under his banner Maniyanpilla Raju Productions. The film stars Saiju Kurup and child artist Deva Nandha in lead roles. The film released in theatres on 17 May 2024. The film had a re-release on 18 July 2024.

== Plot ==
In Gu, the past and present collide in a haunting psycho emotional drama with horror and fantasy elements. Eight-year-old Appu lives in his father's ancient ancestral home, where dark secrets and local folklore fester in the shadows. As he wanders its eerie corridors, he watches his cousin Minna, visiting for the first time, become captivated by the legend of Gulikan, a divine figure from North Kerala's rich mythology.

While Minna and their eldest cousin, Mithran, embrace the supernatural tales tied to their ancestral home, Appu remains skeptical, teetering between curiosity and fear. But when his sister, Paru, begins to show disturbing signs of being possessed, the line between myth and reality begins to fade. Together with the others, they embark on a perilous mission to save her, but what they uncover may be far more terrifying than they imagined! an ancient curse or something darker?

As Minna's father, Sai, a man of logic and reason, dismisses the family's superstitions, the ancestral house's dark past rises to challenge their rational beliefs. The more they search, the deeper the terror runs.

In this supernatural film, Gu weaves folklore and psychological horror.

== Cast ==
- Saiju Kurup as Sai
- Deva Nandha as Minna
- Niranj Maniyanpilla Raju as Mithran
- Maniyanpilla Raju
- Kunjan
- Vineeth Vasudevan as Gulikan
- Aswathi Manoharan
- Nandini Gopalakrishnan
- Laya Simpson
- Devendranath Sankaranarayanan
- Alvin Mukund
- Aadya Amith
- Prayan Prajesh
- Vijay Nellis
- Gauri Unnimaya
- Aneena Angela
- Gopika Rani
- Mohanlal (voice over)

== Release ==
The film released in theatres on 17 May 2024. The film Gu premiered on ManoramaMAX OTT platform on 19 June 2026.

== Reception ==
Critics have praised Gu for its strong performances, particularly from Saiju Kurup and Niranj. The film has been noted for its slow-burn tension and atmospheric buildup, blending supernatural horror with psychological drama. The film is set in the vast, eerie corridors of the family's ancestral home, creating a sense of foreboding as the characters confront not only their fears but also the legacy of their family's dark past.

In particular, the film has been lauded for its rich use of local folklore and the way it incorporates the tension between modern skepticism and traditional beliefs.

For its innovative take on horror 'Gu' received an Honorable Mention at the Los Angeles Indie Horror Fest in 2025.

Gu was selected as a semifinalist in the Best Esoteric Film category at the Metaphysics International Film Festival 2026, held in Moscow, Russia.

Link to full review on The Hindu

Saiju and Niranj shine in this film that deals with supernatural elements in an ancestral home

Times Now rated 4 out of 5 stars and wrote

"Gu is a smart and mature attempt at horror story-telling, also somehow weaving in a sense of nostalgia, and the film does more than just offer scary moments."

Gu Gets A Re-release Due To Positive Audience Response

A Phenomenal Audience Response and re release
