= Binu Adimali =

Indian comedian and actor

- Citizenship: Indian
- Occupations: Actor; Comedian
- Years active: 2013—present

Binu Adimali is an Indian comedian and actor who primarily works in Malayalam Film Industry.

== Filmography ==
Year	Title	Role	Notes	Ref.
2013	Black Butterfly	Cycle Repairer	Debut film	
2013	Housefull	Espade		
2014	Ithihasa	Rarichan		
2015	Vishwasam Athallae Ellaam	Varkey		
2015	Pathemari	Man in Cafeteria		
2016	Paavada	Sugathan		
2016	Darvinte Parinamam	Jayan		
2016	King Liar	Police Constable		
2016	Crayons			
2016	Welcome to Central Jail	Shibu		
2016	Kattappanayile Rithwik Roshan	Peon		
2016	10 Kalpanakal	Jomon		
2017	Georgettan's Pooram	Villager		
2017	Godha	Rogue Man	Cameo	
2017	Velipadinte Pusthakam	Villager		
2018	Carbon	Thankachen		
2018	Kuttanadan Marpappa	Mathai		
2018	Parole	Jailer		
2018	Naam	Suganan		
2018	Kamuki	Professor		
2018	Oru Pazhaya Bomb Kadha	Villager		
2018	Johny Johny Yes Appa	Security		
2018	Thattumpurath Achuthan	Police Constable		
2019	An International Local Story	Josey		
2019	Mask	Police Constable		
2019	Vakathiruvu	Kelu		
2019	Kumbarees			
2019	Mohabbathin Kunjabdulla	Bus Passenger		
2019	Munthiri Monchan	Kambi Rajan		
2020	Shylock	Production Controller Saji		
2020	Mariyam Vannu Vilakkoothi	Police Constable		
2020	Dhamaka	Company Manager		
2021	Tsunami			
2021	Keshu Ee Veedinte Nadhan	George		
2022	Karnan Napoleon Bhagath Singh			
2022	Member Rameshan 9aam Ward	Broker Advocate		
2022	Pathaam Valavu	Constable Charlie		
2022	Jo and Jo	Shibu		
2022	Veekam	Security Guard		
2023	Jailer	Shankaran		
2024	Palayalam P. C.			
2025	916 Kunjoottan			

== Controversy ==
On 14 March 2024, Jinesh filed a case against Binu for abusing and destroying his camera. Later Binu claimed the allegations filed are absurd.
