= Apothecary (film) =

- Theatrical poster
- Directed by: Madhav Ramadasan
- Screenplay by: Hemanth Kumar; Madhav Ramadasan
- Produced by: George Mathew; Baby Mathew
- Starring: Suresh Gopi; Jayasurya; Asif Ali; Abhirami; Indrans; Meera Nandan
- Cinematography: Hari Nair
- Edited by: K. Srinivas
- Music by: Sheikh Ellahi
- Production company: Arambankudiyil Cinemas
- Distributed by: Time Ads Release
- Release date: 7 August 2014
- Running time: 138 minutes
- Country: India
- Language: Malayalam

Apothecary is a 2014 Indian Malayalam-language medical survival thriller film directed by Madhav Ramadasan, and produced by George Mathew and Baby Mathew under the banner of Arambankudiyil Cinemas. The film stars Suresh Gopi, Jayasurya, Asif Ali, Abhirami (after a hiatus of 10 years), Meera Nandan, and Indrans.

The film received Special Jury Mention in 45th Kerala State Film Awards for Indrans and producer, George Mathew.

== Plot ==
Dr. Vijay Nambiar is a skilled and renowned neurosurgeon. He lives with his wife, Dr. Nalini, and their two children. Both doctors work at Apothecary Hospital. The film begins with Nambiar being admitted to the hospital because of a motor vehicle accident. He has suffered a brain injury, and his chance of survival seems slim. Subin Joseph, a patient of Nambiar's, comes to visit him.

Subin recounts his experience at the hospital under Nambiar's care. The hospital is revealed to be run greedily, with patients being subjected to expensive and unnecessary tests and medicines. Nambiar is a doctor with a good reputation, but is forced by the management to run clinical trials for new drugs. He realizes that such trials are necessary for progress, but the lack of ethical protocol and the side effects of such drugs turn the patients' lives into a living hell.

This dilemma consumes him, causing him to have hallucinations of his clinical trial patients. His soul is locked in a surreal struggle between the good and the bad actions of his work. His accident resulted from such an episode wherein he fell to the road in a fit of panic. Finally, he is redeemed with the realization that his work has saved thousands, compared to the few lives destroyed by his actions. Should he live, he would go on to save even more lives.

Nambiar returns to life as a changed man. He confronts the hospital board about their actions. He reminds them of the definition of 'Apothecary' used years back to refer to doctors who treated village folk with their medicines. Stating that the hospital merely retains that name, he leaves the hospital to set up a charitable institution. Nalini and several of the hospital staff and patients accompany him on his new journey.

== Cast ==
- Suresh Gopi as Dr. Vijay Nambiar
- Jayasurya as Subin Joseph
- Asif Ali as Prathapan
- Arun as Dr. Raheem
- Abhirami as Dr. Nalini Nambiar, wife of Vijay
- Meera Nandan as Daisy, lover of Subin
- Raghavan Nair as Dr. Shankar Vasudev
- Indrans as Joseph, father of Subin
- Kavitha Nair as Sabira Usman
- Thampy Antony as Dr. Ali Ahamed
- Neeraj Madhav as Shinoy Joseph, Subin's brother
- Lishoy as Dr. Peethambaran
- Malavika as Meenu
- Jayaraj Warrier as Varghese "Varkkichan"
- Seema G. Nair as Clara Joseph, Subin's mother
- Jayan Cherthala as Sajan Xavier
- Mohanakrishnan as Hameed
- Dr. George Mathew as Dr. Mathew Koshy
- Shivakumar as Dr. M. K. Nambiar, father of Vijay
- Preman as Meenu's father
- Sajad Brite as Usman, husband of Sabira
- Neeraja as Dr. Nimisha
- Tanvi Ram as Subins'Sister
- Saniya Iyappan
- Bindu Krishna as Dr. Maria

== Reception ==
Paresh C. Palicha of Rediff Movies praised Suresh Gopi's performance but noted that the film could have been better, adding that the film "does not have any subtlety, [and] everything that the director wishes to convey has been overtly pronounced by the actors through their dialogues." Nicy, V.P. of International Business Times, wrote that Apothecary is a must watch. She also praised performance of Jayasurya.

== Awards and honours ==
Year	Award	Award category	Artist	Result	Reference
2014	National Film Awards	Best Actor	Jayasurya	Nominated	
2014	2014 Kerala State Film Awards	Special Jury Mention	George Mathew (Producer)	Won	
2014	2014 Kerala State Film Awards	Kerala State Film Award – Special Mention	Indrans (Acting)	Won	
