= 916 Kunjoottan =

- Poster
- Directed by: Aaryan Vijay
- Written by: Rakesh Subramanian; Aaryan Vijay; Raj Vimal Rajan
- Starring: Guinness Pakru; Tini Tom; Rakesh Subramanian; Dayyana Hameed; Niya Varghese
- Cinematography: Sreenivasa Reddy
- Edited by: Don Max
- Music by: Anand Madhusoodanan
- Production company: Morze Dragon Entertainment
- Release date: May 23, 2025
- Country: India
- Language: Malayalam

916 Kunjoottan is a 2025 Indian Malayalam language action thriller film directed by Aaryan Vijay in his directorial debut. The film stars Guinness Pakru in lead role, along with Tini Tom and Rakesh Subramanian.

== Summary ==
916 Kunjoottan is the story of Sidharth, a man with dwarfism, lovingly called as Kunjoottan, freely manages a twin life, one as a humble tea shop owner in his home town and the other as a cunning businessman in the city.

== Cast ==
- Guinness Pakru as Sidharth / 916 Kunjoottan, Under World Gangster
- Tini Tom as Mallan Karnan / Mallan Mahadevan
- Rakesh Subramanian as Gautham/Rudra
- Kottayam Ramesh as Krishnachandran
- Dayyana Hameed as Vaishnavi
- Niya Varghese as Maalu
- Shaju Sreedhar as Sudhi
- Sinoj Angamaly as Manjunathan
- Shivaji Guruvayoor
- Edavela Babu as Tea Shop Owner
- T. G. Ravi as Velappan
- Vijay Menon as Jacob Rowling
- Aristo Suresh
- Sohan Seenulal
- Binu Adimali as Soman
- Dinesh Panicker as Sudhakaran
- Noby Marcose as Hari
- Sunil Sukhada as Anthony
- E Rajendran
- Bittu Thomas as Kelly/Arjun
- Deepak as Deependran

== Production ==
The film bank rolled by Morze dragon entertainment had its title logo announcement by Mohanlal on 23 October 2023 and principal photography started on 24 October 2023. with Aaryan Vijay making his debut as director along with Raj Vimal Rajan as creative director. Kodungallur and Irinjalakuda were the major locations of the film. The first look poster of the film was revealed on 25 March 2025. The first single of the film, 'Kannodu kannil' was released on 6 April 2025, while the trailer of the film was released on 21 April 2025.
