= Ilayaraja (film) =

- Film poster
- Directed by: Madhav Ramadasan
- Written by: Madhav Ramadasan; Sudeep T George
- Produced by: Jayaraj T Krishnan; Sujith Krishna; Bineesh babu
- Starring: Guinness Pakru; Gokul Suresh; Harisree Ashokan; Deepak Parambol
- Cinematography: Pappinu
- Edited by: Shrinivas Krishna
- Music by: Ratheesh Vegha
- Release date: 22 March 2019
- Running time: 142 minutes
- Country: India
- Language: Malayalam

Ilayaraja is a 2019 Indian Malayalam film written and directed by Madhav Ramadasan with a screenplay by Sudeep T George. Guinness Pakru, Harishree Ashokan, Gokul Suresh, Deepak Parampol, Baby Ardra and Master Adityan play the lead roles.

== Plot ==
Subru, the son of Vanajan, who runs a coffee shop in Thrissur and supports his family, is an extraordinary genius in chess. His skill makes him the hero of the town. A teacher who liked Subru's skill brought him from a government school to a public school. With this, Subru's life changes.

== Cast ==
- Guinness Pakru as Vanajan
- Harishree Asokan as Ganapati
- Gokul Suresh as Bryan
- Thampi Antony as Polettan
- Jayaraj Warrier
- Deepak Parampol
- Anil Nedumangad as Mathai
- Arun as Thirumeni
- Alphy Panjikaran as Dr. Neena
- Kavitha Nair
- Kalesh Kannatt
- Baby Ardra
- Master Adityan as Subru
- Indrans (Cameo)
- TS Pattabhiraman
- V. P. Gangadharan

== Soundtrack ==
List of songs in Ilayaraja
Song	Singer(s)	Lyrics	Music
"Kappalandi"	Jayasurya	Santhosh Varma	Ratheesh Vegha
"Cheru Cheru"	Suresh Gopi	Santhosh Varma	Ratheesh Vegha
"Oro Veyilil"	Naresh Iyer	B.K.Harinarayanan	Ratheesh Vegha
"Iravum Pakalum"	Biju Narayanan	B.K.Harinarayanan	Ratheesh Vegha
"Spelling Bee"	Ann Amy	B.K.Harinarayanan	Ratheesh Vegha
"Chemmana Chelode"	Reshma	Jyothish.T.Kashi	Ratheesh Vegha
"Oothiyal Anayilla"	Nikhil Mathew	Madhav Ramadasan	Ratheesh Vegha

== Reception ==
Indian internet company Sify gives Ilayaraja stars and states "Ilayaraja is a feel good tale with noble intentions. It may not perhaps cater much to those loving loud, fast-paced entertainers, but has its moments that suits the family crowds."

Anjana George of The Times of India also awarded the film stating "On the whole, the movie will be a treat for Malayali viewers as it has magnificently captured the essence of lives and the nature around."

Writing in Cinema Express Sajin notes "A cheerful, well-acted underdog story."
