= Arun Cherukavil =

Indian actor

- Born: 2 March 1981 (age 45)
- Citizenship: Indian
- Occupation: Film actor
- Years active: 2000–present
- Notable work: 4 the People

Arun Cherukavil (born 2 March 1981) mononymously known as Arun, is an Indian actor who predominantly works in the Malayalam film industry. He made his film debut in 2000's with the role of Sooraj, one of the students, in Mohanlal starrer Life is Beautiful. After several years, he made his comeback to the film field in 2004 with Jayaraj directed 4 the People.

== Personal life ==
Arun is a native of Ernakulam district. He completed his higher education from St. Paul's College, Kalamassery. Later he chose to be an actor and moved to the film field.

== Career ==
Arun made his film debut in 2000 with Life Is Beautiful, directed by Fazil. In this film, he played the role of a teenage plus two student. After a gap of four years, he returned with 4 the People. He also had notable roles in the films Quotation and Amritham released in the same year. Later, he acted in various roles as protagonist, antagonist and supporting characters. Arun, who was not active in film in the meantime, has recently made a comeback, starring in films such as Honey Bee 2, Underworld, Driving License and Anjaam Pathira.

== Filmography ==
Year	Title	Role	Notes
2000	Life is Beautiful	Sooraj Kishore	Debut Film
2002	Yathrakkarude Shraddhakku	Singer	in the song "Vattayila Panthalittu"
2004	4 the People	Aravind Sebastian	
2004	Ee Snehatheerathu	Murugan	
2004	Quotation	Durga	
2004	Amrutham	Dineshan	
2005	By the People	Aravind Sebastian	
2006	Balram vs. Tharadas	Salim Saheb	
2006	Nottam	Eby George	
2006	Kalabham	Venkidi	
2006	Pathaaka	Anwar	
2007	Best Friends	Sajan	
2007	Ottakkayyan	Mr. A	
2007	November Rain	Sathya	
2007	Nasrani	Benny Paul	
2008	Of the People	Aravind Sebastian	
2008	Anthipponvettam	Jeevan	
2008	Thirakkatha	Narendran	
2009	Black Dalia	Vivek Aravindakshan	
2009	Anamika	Lewis	
2009	Boomi Malayalam	Rahul	
2009	Parayan Marannathu	Manikandan	
2009	Madhya Venal	Praveen	
2010	Pokkiri Raja	Varun	
2010	Mummy & Me	Freddy	
2010	Yugapurushan	Kochuthampuran	
2010	Chaverpada	Abhimanyu	
2011	Bhagavathipuram	Viswanathan	
2012	Bhoomiyude Avakashikal	Unnamed Role	
2012	Hero	Gowtham Menon	
2012	Trivandrum Lodge	Satheesan a.k.a. Sagar	
2012	Banking Hours 10 to 4	Bank Robber	
2012	Veendum Kannur	Hassan Kutty MLA	
2012	Prabhuvinte Makkal	Rajayogi Sukhdev	
2013	Annum Innum Ennum	Plumber Niyaz	
2013	August Club	Kishore	
2013	Hotel California		
2013	Buddy	Biju Pattambi	
2013	David & Goliath	Sunny's Friend	
2013	D Company	News Reporter Venu	in the Segment "Gangs of Vadakkumnaathan"
2013	Ezhu Sundara Rathrikal	Roy	
2014	1983	Manjula's Husband	
2014	Angry Babies in Love	Deepak	
2014	Apothecary	Dr. Raheem	
2014	The Dolphins	Salim Raj aka Saloottan	
2015	Onnum Onnum Moonu	Vivek	
2015	Ente Cinema	Film Artist	
2015	Anarkali	Rajeev	
2017	Honey Bee 2: Celebrations	Vineeth	
2017	Honey Bee 2.5	Himself	
2017	Puthan Panam	Artist	
2018	Kammara Sambhavam	Manu Kumar	
2018	Oru Kuprasidha Payyan	Anwar	
2019	Ilayaraja	Thirumeni	
2019	Sathyam Paranja Viswasikkuvo	Geetha's brother	
2019	Under World	Pulleppally Sadashivan	
2019	Driving Licence	Film Director	
2020	Anjaam Pathiraa	Fr. Bennett Franco	
2021	Tsunami	C.I. Bernad	
2022	Sundari Gardens	Ajith	
2024	Hello Mummy	Fr. Francis	
2025	Ronth	DYSP Jacob	
2025	Dheeran	Suhail	
2026	Unmadham		
