= Gokul Suresh =

Indian actor (born 1993)

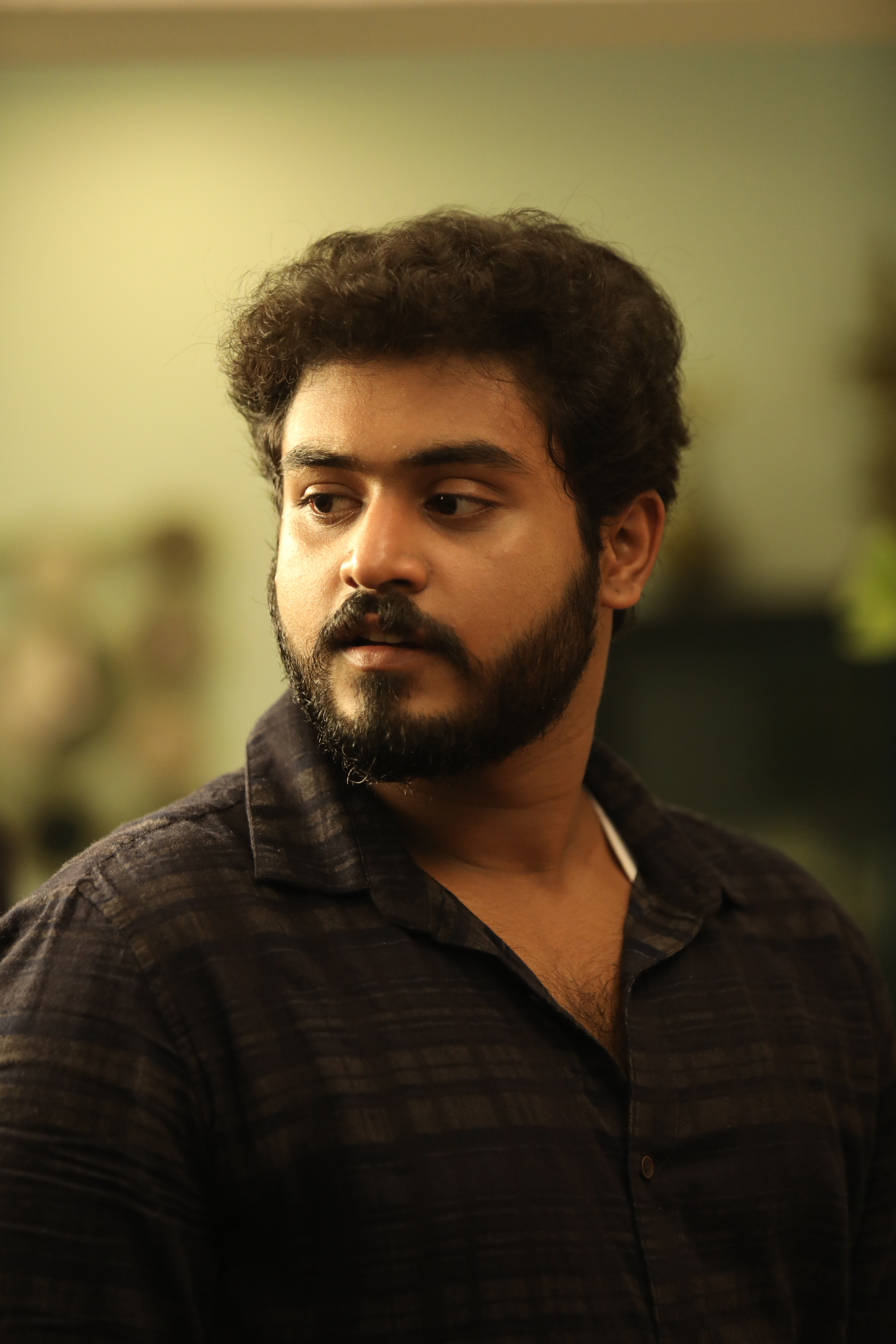
- Gokul Suresh in Ira
- Born: 29 September 1993 (age 33); Kollam, Kerala, India
- Education: Christ University, Bengaluru
- Occupation: Actor
- Years active: 2016–present
- Parents: Suresh Gopi (father); Radhika Nair (mother)

Gokul Suresh (born 29 September 1993) is an Indian actor who appears in Malayalam cinema. He is the son of film actor and politician Suresh Gopi.

== Early life and career ==
Gokul was born as the second child to actor Suresh Gopi and Radhika Nair on 29 September 1993 in Kollam, Kerala. He has two younger sisters Bhagya Suresh, Bhaavni Suresh and a younger brother Madhav Suresh. His elder sister Lakshmi died in a car accident when she was one and a half years old.

Gokul completed his primary level education from St. Thomas Residential School, Thiruvananthapuram and his secondary level education from Pallikoodam, Kottayam and Saraswathy Vidyalaya, Thiruvananthapuram. He graduated with a bachelor's degree in Business Administration from Christ University in Bangalore, and did his internship as a front officer and staff at Le Méridien, Kochi. It was during this time he felt a passion for acting and lost interest in corporate jobs.

In Gokul's debut film Mudhugauv, Aju Varghese was initially cast to play the lead role. But the makers wanted a younger actor to make the character look more convincing. While in search of a younger actor they ended up in Gokul who happened to be producer Sandra Thomas' Facebook friend and then approached him with the script. Gokul found the script for Mudhugauv interesting and later replaced Aju.

== Career ==
=== Acting debut (2016–2017) ===
Gokul had made his debut into acting with the 2016 film Mudhugauv directed by debutant Vipin Das. The movie was a production of Vijay Babu and Sandra Thomas' Friday Film House. He played Bharath, an absentminded college student whose only intention was for his love interest, Ganga. In a typical mixed review, Sanjith Sidhardhan of The Times of India rated Gokul's performance as "it has only helped the actor as he has a sweet and appealing presence", while Anasuya Menon of The Hindu said: "Gokul Suresh's impressive debut in Muddhugauv has clearly set him on track".

In his second venture, he did a supporting character in director Ajai Vasudev's Masterpiece (2017) starring Mammootty. Gokul played a college student Unnikrishnan who is alleged murdering his love interest. Writing for The Times of India, Deepa Soman commended: "Though brief, Gokul Suresh enacts his role decently enough and the makers have tried to ooze as much energy as possible into the song sequences". "Mammootty sir was the reason why I chose Masterpiece. I didn't care whether the character was a long one or a sidekick," said Gokul.

As an actor, Gokul wants to follow Fahadh Faasil's path of career growth and likes Fahadh's perspective on certain aspects. He said to The Times of India, "I watch the interviews of all the actors, but I could personally relate to what Fahadh says".

=== 2018–present ===
In 2018, he acted in Ira, the first combined production of director Vysakh and writer Udaykrishna. He played the lead role alongside Unni Mukundan. Anna M. M. Vetticad of Firstpost called him "suitably sweet" mentioning "which is all he needs to be here". After the release of the film he had revealed that there were attempts to sideline him as the shooting of his films got delayed. But he believed that if someone is talented nobody can stop him or her from reaching the goal.

In early 2019, he played a cameo role as Saghavu Franci alongside Pranav Mohanlal in Arun Gopy's Irupathiyonnaam Noottaandu. His performance earned him positive reviews from critics; Litty Simon of Malayala Manorama said, "Gokul Suresh as Saghavu Franci makes a cameo appearance but definitely leaves an impression". "I have only had four releases till date and yet the most satisfying one was Irupathiyonnaam Noottaandu, which did not even have me as the lead. Though it was just a cameo, the way my character was presented by director Arun Gopy chettan was brilliant. I believe how your character is showcased has a massive impact on how the audience feel about you as an actor" he said.

Gokul next appeared alongside Niranj Maniyanpilla Raju and Varsha Bollamma in Anil Rraj's family-thriller Soothrakkaran (2019). He plays Madathil Aravindan, who helps his father in running a milk products export and import company. Upon release, the film received negative review from critics and Deepika Jayaram of The Times of India thought Gokul's performance in the film reminded "many of his father's aura and swag" and notes that "he manages to keep his poise, even when he exhibits shades of grey". He was also seen acting an extended cameo role alongside Guinness Pakru in Madhav Ramadasan's Ilayaraja. He then acted in writer turned director Suresh Poduval's Ulta with Prayaga Martin as his heroine.

=== Upcoming projects ===
Gokul Suresh in Sayanna Varthakal

Currently he has completed shooting for debutant director Arun Chandu'sSayanna Varthakal. In February 2019, he reportedly signed his next movie, an untitled Tamil-Malayalam bilingual film directed by M. Padmakumar which also has actors Vidharth and Samuthirakani playing important roles. On 9 March 2019, The Times of India reported that Gokul will be playing as Kochu Chackochi in the sequel to the 1997 film Lelam which starred his father Suresh Gopi in the lead. The film titled Lelam 2 will be directed by Nithin Renji Panicker and written by his father Renji Panicker.

== Filmography ==
Key
†	Denotes films that have not yet been released

Year	Title	Role	Notes	Ref.
2016	Mudhugauv	Bharath	Debut film	
2017	Masterpiece	Unnikrishnan		
2018	Ira	Dr. Aryan		
2019	Irupathiyonnaam Noottaandu	Saghavu Francis	Cameo appearance	
2019	Soothrakkaran	Madathil Aravindan		
2019	Ilayaraja	Bryan	Cameo appearance	
2019	Ulta	Chandu		
2022	Paappan	Michael		
2022	Sayanna Varthakal	Ravi Kumar		
2023	King of Kotha	Tony		
2024	Gaganachari	Allan Jose Valamparambil		
2025	Dominic and the Ladies' Purse	Vighnesh/Vicky		
2025	Sumathi Valavu	Mahesh		
2025	Ambalamukkile Visheshangal	Pappu		

== Awards and nominations ==
Year	Award	Category	Film	Result	Ref.
2016	Asiavision Awards	Award for New Promise in Acting (Male)	Mudhugauv	Won	
2017	Asianet Film Awards	Award for Best New Face of the Year (Male)	Mudhugauv	Won	
2017	SIIMA Awards	Award for Best Debut Actor	Mudhugauv	Nominated	
