= Sumathi Valavu =

2025 Indian film

- Theatrical release poster
- Directed by: Vishnu Sasi Shankar
- Written by: Abhilash Pillai
- Produced by: Murali Kunnumpurath; Gokulam Gopalan
- Starring: Arjun Ashokan; Gokul Suresh; Saiju Kurup; Balu Varghese; Malavika Manoj; Sshivada
- Cinematography: P. V. Shankar
- Edited by: Shafique Mohamed Ali
- Music by: Ranjin Raj
- Production companies: Waterman Films LLP; Sree Gokulam Movies
- Distributed by: Dream Big Films
- Release date: 1 August 2025
- Running time: 139 minutes
- Country: India
- Language: Malayalam
- Box office: est.₹25.50 crore

Sumathi Valavu (transl. Sumathi turn) is a 2025 Indian Malayalam-language horror comedy film directed by Vishnu Sasi Shankar and written by Abhilash Pillai. The film stars Arjun Ashokan, Gokul Suresh, Saiju Kurup, Balu Varghese, Malavika Manoj and Sshivada in prominent roles.

The film was inspired by a local legend at Sumathi valavu, a spot in Mylamoodu, Thiruvananthapuram, believed to be haunted by the ghost of Sumathi, a woman murdered in the 1950s. The film was shot in the same location. Taking inspirations from the stories, the makers developed a fictional narrative with elements of horror and comedy.

== Plot ==
The story is centered on a haunted place called Sumathi Valavu, with the ghost of a Tamil woman guarding it for years. A group of people experience supernatural incidents linked to the location.

== Cast ==
- Arjun Ashokan as Appu
- Gokul Suresh as Mahesh, Appu's friend
- Saiju Kurup as Hari, Appu's friend and Forest Officer
- Balu Varghese as Ambadi, Appu's friend
- Malavika Manoj as Bhama, Appu's lover
- Sshivada as Deepa Teacher, Bhama's friend
- Abhilash Pillai as Giri, Appu's friend
- Joohi Jayakumar as Sreedevi, Mahesh's wife
- Sidharth Bharathan as Chemban, Appu's friend
- Gopika Anil as Meenakshi, Ambadi's love interest
- Manoj K. U. as Vijayan Pillai, Appu's father
- Sminu Sijo as Shobha, Appu's mother
- Jasnya Jayadeesh as Sumathi / ghost
- Siva Ajayan as Kuttappi, Appu and Ambadi's friend
- Sreejith Ravi as Sudhakaran, Bhama's father
- Ananthalal as Rajan
- Sajitha Sreejith
- Shravan Mukesh as Bhadran
- Deva Nandha as Alli, Appu's niece
- Sija Rose as Suja
- Shreepath Yan as Vavakuttan, Bhama's brother
- Lekshmi Abhilash as Appu's sister
- Jayakrishnan as Hamza
- Nandu as Shekharan, Mahesh's father and Bhama's uncle
- Bobby Kurian as SI Benjamin, Bhadran's accomplice
- Kottayam Ramesh as Aashan (Master), Meenakshi's father
- Sumesh Chandran as Mani, Bhadran's friend and assistant
- Chembil Ashokan as Constable Madhu
- Jay Raavu as Velu
- Sandeep as Shakthi
- Vijaykumar as Adivasi
- Sreekanth Vettiyar as doctor
- Aniyappan as Pappan
- Rafi as Kichu
- Bhama as Malu, Mahesh's sister and Hari's wife (Cameo Appearance)

== Production ==
The film is produced by Murali Kunnumpurath under Waterman Films LLP in association with Think Studios. Principal photography began in November 2024 in Palakkad, Kerala. Cinematography is handled by P. V. Shankar, with editing by Shafique Mohamed Ali. The film wrapped in March 2025.

== Music ==
The film's music is composed by Ranjin Raj.

== Release ==
The teaser of the film released on 20 April 2025. Sumathi Valavu was released on 1 August 2025. The film released on ZEE5 from 26 September 2025.

== Prequel ==
On 9 August 2025, the makers announced a prequel titled Sumathi Valavu 2: The Origin. The film will explore the origins of the folklore behind the haunted locale featured in the original, delving into the tragic events that shaped its legend. Director Vishnu Sasi Shankar, writer Abhilash Pillai, composer Ranjin Raj, and producers Gokulam Gopalan and Murali Kunnumpurath will return for the prequel. While it is yet to be confirmed if the original cast will reprise their roles, the producers stated that several prominent South Indian actors will be part of the project.
