= Madhav Ramadasan =

Indian film director, screenwriter and actor

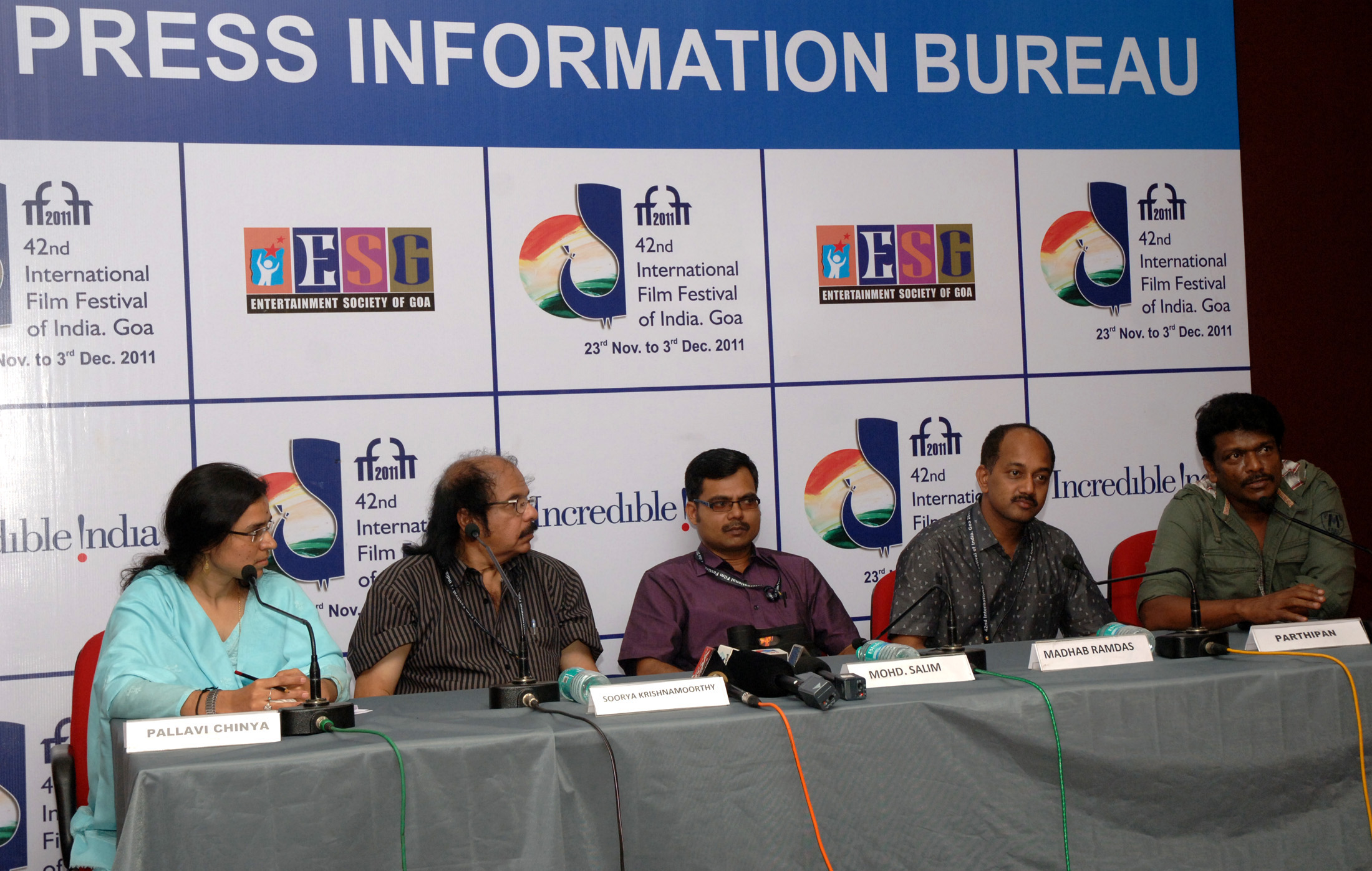
- Ramadasan, IFFI (2012)
- Born: 22 May 1973 (age 53); Kalluvazhi, Ottapalam, Kerala, India
- Education: Calicut University
- Occupation: Film director
- Years active: 1994–present
- Spouse: Kalamandalam Bindulekha

Madhav Ramadasan is an Indian film director, screenwriter and actor, who works in Malayalam film industry.

== Personal life ==
Madhav Ramadasan was born to P. Madhavan and T.P. Radha at Kalluvazhi near Ottapalam. He did his schooling at AKNM-MA Memorial High School, Kattukulam.

== Film career ==
He started his career by working in documentary, advertising and short films. He then worked as an associate director with R. Sarath in the Malayalam feature films Sthithi and Sayahnam. He made his directorial debut with the legal thriller Melvilasom in 2011. The film was an adaptation of a play written by Soorya Krishna Moorthy which itself was based on the Hindi play Court Martial by Swadesh Deepak. The film received wide critical acclaim and won numerous awards. In 2014, he directed the medical thriller Apothecary which portrayed relationship between a doctor and his patients. In 2019, he directed Ilayaraja which had Guinness Pakru playing the main character. In 2026, Aazhi will be director Madhav's first release in seven years after Ilayaraja (2019). The upcoming film will also be his first Tamil film, with all his previous projects being made in Malayalam.

== Filmography ==
Year	Film	Notes
2011	Melvilasom	Directorial debut. The 15th Gollapudi Srinivas National award for the ‘Best Debut Director 2011’. P. Bhaskaran award for the Best Feature film of 2011. Selected to the 16th Busan International Film Festival (BIFF) in Busan, South Korea.
2014	Apothecary	
2019	Ilayaraja	
2026	Aazhi	Tamil film
