= Ambalamukkile Visheshangal =

2025 Indian Malayalam-language comedy-drama film

- Directed by: Jayaram Kailas
- Written by: Umesh Krishnan
- Produced by: J. Sarath Chandran Nair
- Starring: Gokul Suresh; Lal; Major Ravi; Shaheen Siddique; Dharmajan Bolgatty; Mareena Michael Kurisingal; Biju Kuttan; Aneesh G Menon
- Cinematography: Abdul Rahim
- Edited by: Ranjan Abraham
- Music by: Arul Dev
- Production company: Chand Creations
- Distributed by: Raj Sagar Films
- Release date: December 12, 2025 (India)
- Country: India
- Language: Malayalam

Ambalamukkile Visheshangal is a 2025 Indian Malayalam-language comedy-drama film directed by Jayaram Kailas and produced by J. Sarath Chandran Nair under the banner Chand Creations. The film stars Gokul Suresh in the lead role, alongside Lal, Ganapathi, Major Ravi, Shaheen Siddique, and Dharmajan Bolgatty.

Set in a rural Kerala village, the film follows a group of unemployed youngsters and the humorous events that unfold in their everyday lives. The film was theatrically released on 12 December 2025, after facing delays from its initially planned 2021 release.

== Plot ==
The story is set in the quiet village of Ambalamukku and revolves around Pappu, an unemployed youth burdened with academic backlogs and a questionable reputation. As he attempts to win the affection of a young woman he admires, Pappu finds himself caught between village gossip, family expectations, and a series of comic misadventures. The film narrates his efforts to overcome these challenges while restoring order to his chaotic life.

== Cast ==
- Gokul Suresh as Pappu
- Lal as Alex John
- Ganapathi
- Major Ravi
- Shaheen Siddique
- Dharmajan Bolgatty
- Mareena Michael Kurisingal
- Biju Kuttan
- Aneesh G. Menon

== Production ==
The film is directed by Jayaram Kailas, best known for his 2015 Malayalam film Akkaldhamayile Pennu. The story and screenplay were written by Umesh Krishnan. Cinematography was handled by Abdul Rahim, with editing by Ranjan Abraham.

Principal photography began in November 2020 and was completed by January 2021. The film’s theatrical release was subsequently delayed, following disruptions caused by the COVID-19 pandemic and related cinema shutdowns.

== Music ==
The film's soundtrack and background score were composed by Ranjin Raj, with additional songs composed by Arul Dev. The first video song, titled "Nannavan", was released in August 2021 and received positive attention for its folk-based composition. Promotional and film songs such as "Oru Koottam" and "Malare Malare" were released ahead of the film’s theatrical debut.

== Release ==
The motion poster of Ambalamukkile Visheshangal was released in 17 March 2021 by actor Mohanlal through his social media platforms. In 5 May 2021, actor Tovino Thomas unveiled another promotional poster of the film through his social media platforms. The official trailer was unveiled in 8 December 2025.

The film was released theatrically across Kerala on 12 December 2025 and was distributed by Raj Sagar Films.

== Reception ==
Writing for Manorama Online, critic Jithin described Ambalamukkile Visheshangal as a simple rural comedy-drama that draws strength from its performances and music, particularly praising Lal’s role, while noting that its predictable narrative and pacing limit its overall impact.

In a review for TV9 English, Vivek Narayanan characterised the film as a comforting slice-of-life drama set in a Kerala village, highlighting its emotional tone, humour, and performances, while observing that it favours familiar storytelling over narrative ambition.
