= Aazhi (2026 film) =

2026 Tamil-language film

- Theatrical release poster
- Directed by: Madhav Ramadasan
- Written by: Madhav Ramadasan
- Produced by: Sajith Krishna
- Starring: R. Sarathkumar; Indrajith Jagajith; Devika Satheesh
- Cinematography: Aanand N. Nair
- Edited by: K. Sreenivas
- Music by: Jassie Gift
- Production companies: 888 Production; Celluloid Creaations
- Distributed by: Uthraa Productions
- Release date: 27 February 2026
- Country: India
- Language: Tamil

Aazhi is a 2026 Indian Tamil-language thriller film written and directed by Madhav Ramadasan. It stars R. Sarathkumar, Indrajith Jagajith, and Devika Satheesh in the lead roles. The film was released in theatres on 27 February 2026.

== Cast ==
- R. Sarathkumar as Moorthy
- Indrajith Jagajith as Arul
- Devika Satheesh as Mukila
- Vaiyapuri
- Sreejith Ravi
- Birla Bose
- Thamarai Selvi
- Sarjin Kumar
- Mythili Sathyaraj
- Binish Babu
- Biju Mavunkal Varghese
- Teena Bhatia

== Production ==
The film was written and directed by Madhav Ramdas and produced by Sajith Krishna. Cinematography was handled by Aanand N. Nair, while editing was done by K. Sreenivas. The music for the film was composed by Jassie Gift.

== Release ==
The film was released in theatres on 27 February 2026.

== Reception ==
Abhinav Subramanian of The Times of India wrote of the film, "A pivotal moment hinges on Moorthy getting his leg trapped in the ship's engine room machinery, a convenience that forces the moral reckoning rather than letting it emerge from the tension already in play. It's an easy way to force a turning point."

Asianet News critic wrote that "Sarathkumar's menacing 'make-over' and acting, the thrilling survival scenes that take place in the middle of the ocean, and the emotional contribution of the pet dog in the film are all huge pluses for the film."
