= Manasa Vacha =

- Theatrical Release Poster
- Directed by: Sreekumar Podiyan
- Written by: Majeed Sayed
- Produced by: Oniel Kurup
- Starring: Dileesh Pothan; Alexander Prasanth; Saikumar; Ahana Vinesh; Sreejith Ravi
- Cinematography: Eldho Issac
- Edited by: Lijo Paul
- Music by: Sunil Kumar PK
- Production company: Start Action Cut Productions
- Release date: 8 March 2024
- Country: India
- Language: Malayalam

Manasa Vacha is a 2024 Malayalam language comedy film, directed by debutant Sreekumar Podiyan, starring Dileesh Pothan, Alexander Prasanth, Kiron Kumar, Sreejith Ravi and Saikumar in lead roles.

The film was scheduled to be released in theatres on 23 February 2024, but was postponed due to Film exhibitors organisation of Kerala (FEOUK) strike and had a released on 8 March 2024.

== Summary ==
The film tells the story of Dharavi Dinesh and his two friends and their plan for an unbelievable heist that will make everyone settle down in life, but a team is ready to grab them and it starts a comedy of errors.

== Cast ==
- Dileesh Pothan - Dharavi Dinesh
- Alexander Prasanth
- Kiron Kumar
- Sreejith Ravi
- Ahana Vinesh
- Saikumar
- Vinod Kovoor
- Kalabhavan Haneef

== Production ==
Director Sreekumar Podiyan decided to make a comic film on the pattern of Meesa Madhavan, Crazy Gopalan, Thaskaraveeran (2005 film), Sapthamashree Thaskaraha, Robin Hood (2009 film) and Vettam.

=== Filming ===
Principal photography commenced on 29 March 2023 and filming was completed on 26 April 2023 and the entire filming was done in Thrissur.

=== Marketing ===
On 29 September 2023, the first look poster of the film was released by actor Dileesh Pothan through his Facebook page, featuring himself, Sreekumar and Kiron Kumar.

On 28 January 2024, the promo song, Manasa Vacha Karmana..., sung by Jassie Gift was released through the YouTube channel of Manorama Music Songs.

On 5 February 2024, a 20 seconds teaser of the film was released on Manorama Music Songs YouTube channel.

On 23 February 2024, the trailer of the film was released on Manorama Music Songs YouTube channel.
