= My Santa (film) =

2019 film directed by Sugeeth

- Theatrical release poster
- Directed by: Sugeeth
- Written by: Jemin Cyriac
- Produced by: Nishad Koya; Ajeesh O. K. Sajith Krishna; Saritha Sugeeth
- Starring: Dileep; Manasvi Kottachi; Sunny Wayne; Anaswara Rajan; Anusree; Deva Nandha; Shine Tom Chacko; Aju Varghese
- Cinematography: Faizal Ali
- Edited by: V.Saajan
- Music by: Vidyasagar
- Production company: Wall Poster Entertainment
- Distributed by: Kalasangham Films
- Release date: 25 December 2019 (India)
- Running time: 153 minutes
- Country: India
- Language: Malayalam

My Santa is a 2019 Indian Malayalam-language comedy drama christmas film, directed by Sugeeth and written by Jemin Cyriac, starring Dileep, Sunny Wayne, Manasvi Kottachi, Anaswara Rajan, Anusree, Deva Nandha, Kalabhavan Shajohn, Shine Tom Chacko and Indrans with Aju Varghese make in cameo appearance. The film is produced by Nishad Koya, Ajeesh OK, Sajith Krishna, and Saritha Sugeeth for the banner of Wall Poster Entertainment. The music is composed by Vidyasagar.

== Plot ==
Aisa Elizabeth, a second-grader, lost her father, mother, and grandmother in an accident. She is staying with her grandfather. Grandfather, pet Elliamma, loving neighbors, and schoolgirl, Anna Teresa, are her world.

Santa is the protagonist of Aisa's mind from her grandfather's stories. She hopes that Santa Claus is alive somewhere and that Santa will come to see her once in a while. She also has some wishes to ask Santa that Christmas. Last Christmas night, Santa arrives to meet Aisa and accompanies her that night to fulfill her wishes.

== Cast ==
- Dileep as Abel Abraham Thekkan / Santa Claus, Anna's father and Isa's adopted father
- Manasvi Kottachi as Isa Elizabeth Jacob
  - Anaswara Rajan as Adult Isa (Cameo), Abel's adopted daughter
- Sunny Wayne as Aby Mathew
- Deva Nandha as Anna Theresa, Abel's daughter and Isa's friend
- Anusree as Maria Abel, Anna's mother
- Sai Kumar as Chacko (Kuttoosan), Isa's grandfather
- Siddique as Paul Pappan
- Kalabhavan Shajon as Shareeff
- Indrans as Krishnan
- Dharmajan as Manukuttan
- Shine Tom Chacko as S. I of Police Officer
- Suresh Krishna as Dr. Stephen Philip
- Irshad as Babu, Maria's brother
- Manju Pathrose as Smitha Paul
- Deeraj Rathnam
- Aju Varghese as Joji Varghese (Cameo)
- Nandan Unni as Art Director (Cameo)
- Govind Padmasoorya as Isa's Father (Photo Presence)
- Sshivada as Isa's Mother (Photo Presence)
- Radhika Pandit as Lakshmi (Photo presence)

== Music ==
My Santa
- Album Cover

Soundtrack album by Vidyasagar
- Released: 22 December 2019
- Recorded: Varsha Vallaki Studios
- Genre: Feature Film Soundtrack
- Length: 27:18
- Language: Malayalam
- Label: Goodwill Entertainments
- Producer: Vidyasagar

Vidyasagar chronology
Aaruthra (2018)	My Santa (2019)	Solamante Theneechakal (2022)
External audio
- Official Audio Jukebox on YouTube

The music and background score for the film is composed by Vidyasagar. The lyrics were written by Nishad Ahamed and Santhosh Varma.

Track listing
No.	Title	Lyrics	Singer(s)	Length
1.	"Oh Bullemma"	Santhosh Varma	Karthik	5:45
2.	"Muth Nee"	Nishad Ahamed	Roshni Suresh	4:34
3.	"Velli Panji"	Santhosh Varma	Merin Gregory	3:07
4.	"Carol"	Nishad Ahamed	Roshni Suresh	5:02
5.	"Santa Superstar"	Nishad Ahamed	Niranj Suresh, Aadya Nair, Ria Ranjith, Rachel Kurian, Uday K, Aditya K	4:02
6.	"Velli Panji (Child Version)"	Santhosh Varma	Hanna Regi	4:18
Total length:				27:18

== Production ==
The movie is produced by Jairaj Motion Pictures and Josemon Simon under the banner of Wall Poster Entertainments.

== Release ==
The film was released on 25 December 2019. The satellite rights of the film were bought by Zee Keralam and it was released on the OTT in Zee5 .

== Reception ==
Ajith of Malayala Manorama wrote that "with ample doses of humor and emotions, My Santa is a feel good entertainer that would excite the young audience and draw families to the theaters this holiday season." Sajin Shrijith of The New Indian Express stated that "this Santa brings a few cheers but no gifts" and added: "My Santa is a film that demands too much from the viewer. In addition to requiring an immense reserve of patience, it requires one to put up with its heightened theatricality, 90s-style melodrama, and excessive sweetness." Sify rated it 3 out of 5 stars and gave the verdict: "Family & Kids special!" The Times of India calling the film "A Christmas gift for children" gave it a 3 out of 5 rating. The reviewer appreciated Baby Manasvi's performance and wrote that she "steals the show with her splendid acting, coming across easily as the loving, innocent and stubborn girl."

== See also ==
- List of Christmas films
- Santa Claus in film
