= Lahai, Kerala =

Lahai Gateway to Sabarimala poongavanam
- Village
- Location in Kerala, India Lahai (India)
- Coordinates: 9°22′7″N 76°54′25″E
- Country: India
- State: Kerala
- District: Pathanamthitta

Government
  - Type: Panchayath
  - Body: Perunad panchayath
- Elevation: 910 m (2,990 ft)

Languages
  - Official: Malayalam, English
- Time zone: UTC+5:30 (IST)
- PIN: 689662
- Area code: 04735
- Vehicle registration: KL-62, KL-03

Lahai, also spelt Laha is a remote settlement located in the north eastern part of Pathanamthitta district, Kerala state, India. This is the place from which the sacred grove (Poongavanam) of Lord Ayyappa begins.

== Geography ==
Lahai lies about 3,000 ft (910 m) above mean sea level, predominantly a hilly region or Malanad. The place is covered by thick forests of Ranni division.

== Demographics ==
The average population is about 3000 people. The major revenue is from Lahai Rubber estate which was established by the British in the early 1900s with 10,000 acres (40 km^{2}) of land.

== Climate ==
Lahai experiences a tropical climate as in many parts of Kerala. Significant amount of rainfall occurs during the months of June, July and August. Humidity is comparatively less here with an average annual temperature of about 29.37°C. The average annual precipitation is 2407mm. The months of January and February receives low rainfall. Temperature falls in December and January to 20°C. March, April and May are the hottest months in the year.

Climate data for Lahai, Kerala
Month	Jan	Feb	Mar	Apr	May	Jun	Jul	Aug	Sep	Oct	Nov	Dec	Year
Mean daily maximum °C (°F)	29.0 (84.2)	30.0 (86.0)	31.2 (88.2)	31.4 (88.5)	31.1 (88.0)	29.0 (84.2)	28.2 (82.8)	28.4 (83.1)	28.9 (84.0)	28.6 (83.5)	28.1 (82.6)	28.5 (83.3)	29.4 (84.9)
Mean daily minimum °C (°F)	20.2 (68.4)	21.0 (69.8)	22.3 (72.1)	23.3 (73.9)	23.5 (74.3)	22.5 (72.5)	22.0 (71.6)	22.1 (71.8)	22.0 (71.6)	21.9 (71.4)	21.5 (70.7)	20.5 (68.9)	21.9 (71.4)
Average precipitation mm (inches)	24 (0.9)	38 (1.5)	70 (2.8)	152 (6.0)	220 (8.7)	406 (16.0)	433 (17.0)	282 (11.1)	208 (8.2)	298 (11.7)	208 (8.2)	68 (2.7)	2,407 (94.8)
Source: Climate-Data.org

== Location ==
Lahai is surrounded by the tropical rain forests of Ranni forest division. The Sabarimala forest (Poongavanam) begins from Lahai. The uphill road to Sabarimala ends at Lahai and become level road all the way to Sabarimala.

The Sabarigiri Hydro electric Project in 1960s had built heavy equipment transportation road to Moozhiyar Power House. This road now exclusively used by pilgrims to Sabarimala.

The Sabarimala Thiruvabharanam procession comes to Lahai forest Bungalow, stays overnight and continues to Sabarimala temple. The St. Thomas Pilgrim Church at Nilakkal is 10 miles (16 km) away from Lahai Junction.

== Nearby places ==
- Perunad
- Puthukkada
- Velamplavu
- Manakkayam
- Plappally
- Elavumkal
- Chittar
- Vadasserikkara
