= Alphy Panjikaran =

Indian actress (born 1990)

- Born: Angamaly, Kerala, India
- Education: Anna University
- Occupations: Actress, theatre artist
- Years active: 2018–present
- Parents: Thomas; Molly Thomas

Alphy Panjikaran is an Indian actress, who works in Malayalam film industry. She made her Malayalam film debut in 2018 and got a breakthrough for her performance in Shikkari Shambhu. Alphy later played notable character roles in Malayalam films including critically acclaimed Sunday Holiday, Vallikudilile Vellakaaran, Signature, Ilayaraja, Maarconi Mathaai and Malikappuram.

== Career ==
Alphy Panjikaran completed bachelor's degree in BE Computer Science from Anna University.

Alphy first gained attention for her role as Revathi in the 2018 Malayalam film Shikkari Shambhu.

== Filmography ==
Key
†	Denotes films that have not yet been released

=== Films ===
List of Alphy Panjikaran film credits
Year	Title	Role	Notes	Ref.
2017	Sunday Holiday	Amal's Sister		
2018	Shikkari Shambhu	Revathi	Debut	
2018	Vallikudilile Vellakaaran	Aswathi		
2019	Maarconi Mathaai	Reena		
2019	Ilayaraja	Dr. Neena		
2022	Signature	Femina		
2022	Malikappuram	Sowmya		
2026	Baby Girl	Meenakshi's sister		

=== Web series ===
Year	Title	Role	Language	Notes
2024	Nagendran's Honeymoons	Janaki	Malayalam	Disney+ Hotstar
