= Ranjin Raj =

Indian music composer (b. 1988)

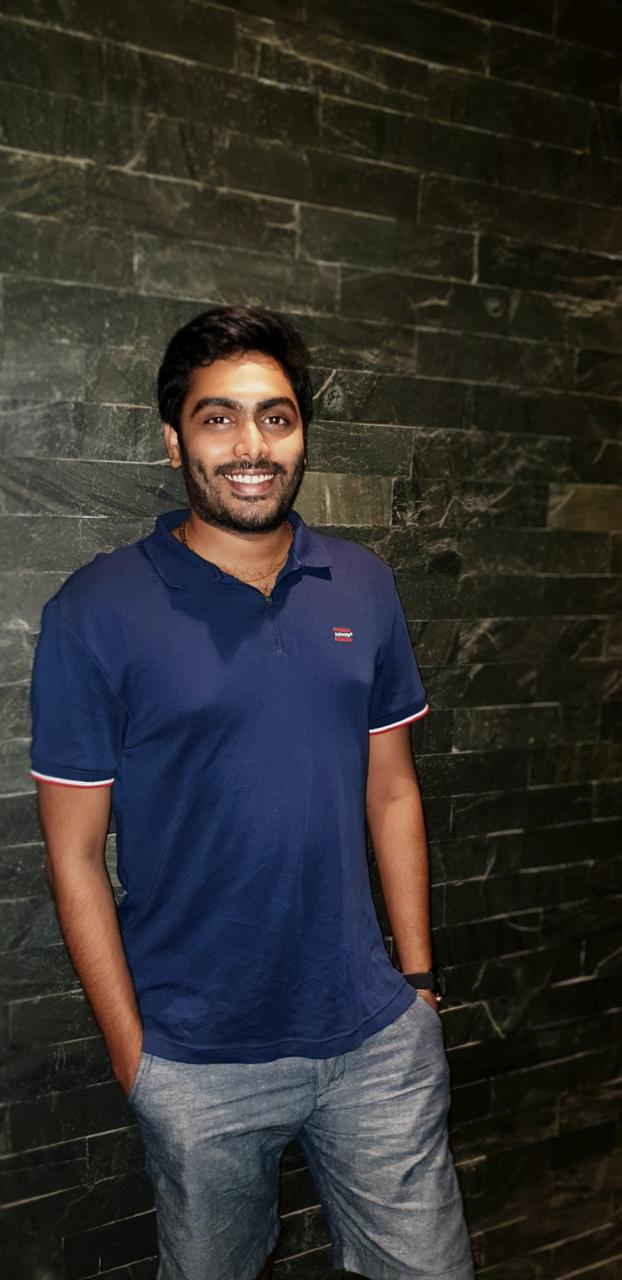
- Born: Ranjin Raj Varma; 11 December
- Occupations: Music composer; Playback singer; Keyboardist; Lyricist
- Years active: 2015–present
- Spouse: Silpa Tulsi (m. 2013)
- Children: 1

Ranjin Raj (born 11 December) is an Indian musician and composer who works in the Malayalam film industry. He made his film debut with Joseph, which was released on 16 November 2018.

He is notable for his work in the movies like Joseph, Kaanekkane, Patham Valavu, Kaaval, Cadavar and Malikkapuram.

Poomuthole, Kannatha dhooram and Pal Nilavin are his Kerala State Award Winning songs for various artists.

== Personal life ==
Ranjin was born at Melarcode, Kerala to M Rajendran and Supriya Rajendran, Palakkad. He married Silpa Tulsi on 25 August 2013.

== Career ==
He was a contestant on Idea Star Singer 2007, a music reality show telecasted on Asianet. Ranjin started his career as in-house music producer for media such as Flowers (TV channel), Zee Keralam and his works include Comedy Utsavam and Uppum Mulakum telecasting on Flowers (TV channel).

He associated to director V. A Shrikumar for the film Odiyan, starring Mohanlal, for which he composed scores for two promo videos.

Ranjin Raj started his film career as a musician with the films Nithyaharitha Nayakan and Joseph. His song named Poomuthole from the film Joseph was a hit.

== Discography ==
Year	Title	Language	Songs	Score	Notes
2018	Joseph	Malayalam	Yes	No	Debut Film
2018	Nithyaharitha Nayakan	Malayalam	Yes	Yes	
2019	Ormayil Oru Shishiram	Malayalam	Yes	Yes	
2020	Al - mallu	Malayalam	Yes	Yes	
2021	Wolf	Malayalam	Yes	Yes	Released in Zee5
2021	Kaanekkaane	Malayalam	Yes	Yes	Movie released in SonyLIV
2021	Star	Malayalam	Yes	No	
2021	Kaaval	Malayalam	Yes	Yes	
2022	Karnan Napoleon Bhagath Singh	Malayalam	Yes	Yes	
2022	Night Drive	Malayalam	Yes	Yes	
2022	Pathaam Valavu	Malayalam	Yes	Yes	
2022	Cadaver	Tamil	Yes	Yes	Movie released in Disney Hotstar
2022	Shefeekkinte Santhosham	Malayalam	No	Yes	
2022	Yugi	Tamil	Yes	No	
2022	Adrishyam	Malayalam	Yes	No	
2022	Malikappuram	Malayalam	Yes	Yes	
2023	Kallanum Bhagavathiyum	Malayalam	Yes	Yes	
2023	Within Seconds	Malayalam	Yes	Yes	
2023	Kunjamminis Hospital	Malayalam	Yes	Yes	
2023	Kota Bommali PS	Telugu	Yes	Yes	
2023	Queen Elizabeth	Malayalam	Yes	Yes	
2024	Mahadev Ka Ghorakpur	Bhojpuri	Yes	Yes	
2024	Nagendran's Honeymoons	Malayalam	No	Yes	Hotstar Web Series
2024	Panchayath Jetty	Malayalam	Yes	Yes	
2024	Chithini	Malayalam	Yes	Yes	
2024	Anand Sreebala	Malayalam	Yes	Yes	
2025	Sumathi Valavu	Malayalam	Yes	Yes	
2025	Ambalamukkile Visheshangal	Malayalam	Yes	Yes	
2025	Ponkala	Malayalam	Yes	Yes	
2026	Sampradayini Suppini Suddapoosani	Telugu	Yes	Yes	
2026	Bhishmar	Malayalam	Yes	Yes	
2026	Revolver Rinko	Malayalam	Yes	Yes	
2026	Eyes	Malayalam	Yes	Yes	SonyLIV Web Series
2026	Grandfather †	Tamil	Yes	Yes	
2026	Bombay Positive †	Malayalam	Yes	Yes	
2026	The Police Story †	Malayalam	Yes	Yes	
2026	Soorya †	Hindi	Yes	No	
2026	Theri Meri †	Malayalam	Yes	Yes	
2026	Junior †	Malayalam	Yes	Yes	
2026	Chottanikara Lakshmikutty †	Malayalam	Yes	Yes	
2026	Anjangaporu †	Malayalam	Yes	Yes	
2026	Chanthattam †	Malayalam	Yes	Yes	
2027	Harivarasanam †	Malayalam	Yes	Yes	

== Awards ==
Year	Title	Category	Film	Status
2019	Mazhavil Entertainment Award	Best Music Director	Joseph	Won
2019	Vayalar Award	Best Music Director	Joseph	Won
2019	Girish Puthenchery Award	Best Music Director	Joseph	Won
2019	Movie street Award	Best Music Director	Joseph	Won
2019	8th South Indian International Movie Awards	Best Music Director	Joseph	Nominated
2022	10th South Indian International Movie Awards	Best Music Director	Kaanekkaane	Nominated
2023	11th South Indian International Movie Awards	Best Music Director	Malikappuram	Nominated
2023	Mowli Film Awards	Best Music Director	Malikappuram, Pathaam Valavu	Won
2023	Poovachal Khader Award	Best Music Director	Malikappuram, Pathaam Valavu	Won
2023	Navakerala News Award	Best Music Director	Malikappuram	Won
2023	Minnalai Award	Best Music Director	Malikappuram, Night Drive	Won
