= Night Drive (film) =

- Official theatre poster
- Directed by: Vysakh
- Written by: Abhilash Pillai
- Produced by: Neeta Pinto; Priya Venu
- Starring: Indrajith Sukumaran; Roshan Mathew; Anna Ben
- Cinematography: Shaji Kumar
- Edited by: Sunil S. Pillai
- Music by: Ranjin Raj
- Production company: Aan Mega Media
- Distributed by: Aan Mega Media
- Release date: 11 March 2022
- Running time: 118 minutes
- Country: India
- Language: Malayalam

Night Drive is a 2022 Indian Malayalam-language crime thriller film directed by Vysakh and written by Abhilash Pillai starring Indrajith Sukumaran, Roshan Mathew, Anna Ben and Siddique. The movie tells the story of how a young couple lands in trouble after meeting a road accident. The film was released on 11 March 2022.

== Plot ==
The plot is about a young couple who are out on a drive and meet an accident. It leaves them in a triangle between a cop who investigates the accident and the corrupt political hegemony in their pursuit.

== Cast ==
- Indrajith Sukumaran as CI Benny Moopan
- Roshan Mathew as Georgy
- Anna Ben as Riya Roy
- Siddique as Minister Rajan Kurup
- Kalabhavan Shajon as DYSP Chacko Cherian
- Alexander Prasanth as Francis/Pranchi
- Sreevidya Mullachery as Ammini Ayyappan/Ayyappan
- Santhosh Keezhattoor as CPO Pappan
- Kailash as Balu Krishna (Rajan Kurup's P.A)
- Surabhi Santosh as Amina (Balu's wife)
- Srikant Murali as Dr. Firoz
- Sudheer Karamana as Jaleel (Rajan Kurup's P.A)
- Sohan Seenulal as Santhosh (Rajan Kurup's P.A)
- Muthumani as City Police Commissioner Sharanya Varma IPS
- Renji Panicker as Roy (Riya's Father) (Cameo appearance)
- Shaju Sreedhar as Anil Nair (Channel Head)
- Della George as Reporter

== Music ==
The music was composed by Ranjin Raj and features one song, titled "Paathi Paathi Parayathe", sung by Kapil Kapilan and Nithya Maammen. Murukan Kattakada is the lyricist of the song.

== Release ==
=== Theatrical ===
The film was first scheduled to be released in March 2021 but was postponed due to the COVID-19 pandemic. It was theatrically released on 11 March 2022.

== Reception ==
V Vinod Nair of The Times of India gave it a 3.5/5 rating and wrote that "If you are looking for a good thriller to kick off your weekend, Night Drive is the film for you". A critic from OTT Play stated that "Though Night Drive starts off as an atypical Vysakh thriller and eventually veers towards the director's familiar territory, the refreshing casting choices do the film a world of good in making it entertaining". Anushka Rao of Digital Mafia Talkies wrote that "It is a highly recommended watch that is well worth your time."
