= Kalamandalam Bindhulekha =

Indian painter (born 1978)

- Born: Bindhulekha; 18 October 1978 (age 47)
- Occupations: Mural painter, Dancer
- Years active: 2001–present

Kalamandalam Bindhulekha (born 18 October 1978) is a mural painter and Mohiniyattam, Bharathanatyam dancer from Kerala state, India. She is the first woman mural painter in temple drawing from Kerala state.

== Early life and background ==
Kalamandalam Bindhulekha is a diploma holder in Mohiniyattam and Bharathanatyam and has graduated from Kerala Kalamandalam. She took up mural painting, after having been attracted by the work of her brother-in-law, Sadanandan, a disciple of Mammiyur Krishnan Kutty Nair and was trained in the genre for six years.

== Art career ==
Her debut work in Tiroor Vadakurumbakaavu temple in Thrissur is considered the first mural painting to be done in a Kerala temple by a woman artist. It took two years to complete the mural painting which consisted of three forms of Devi - Saraswati (in shades of white), Bhadrakali (in shades of dark blue) and Mahalakshmi (in shades of red). The painting was based on the theme "Rajas tamas satva".
