= Justin Jose =

Indian Sound Engineer and Sound Mixer (born 1980)

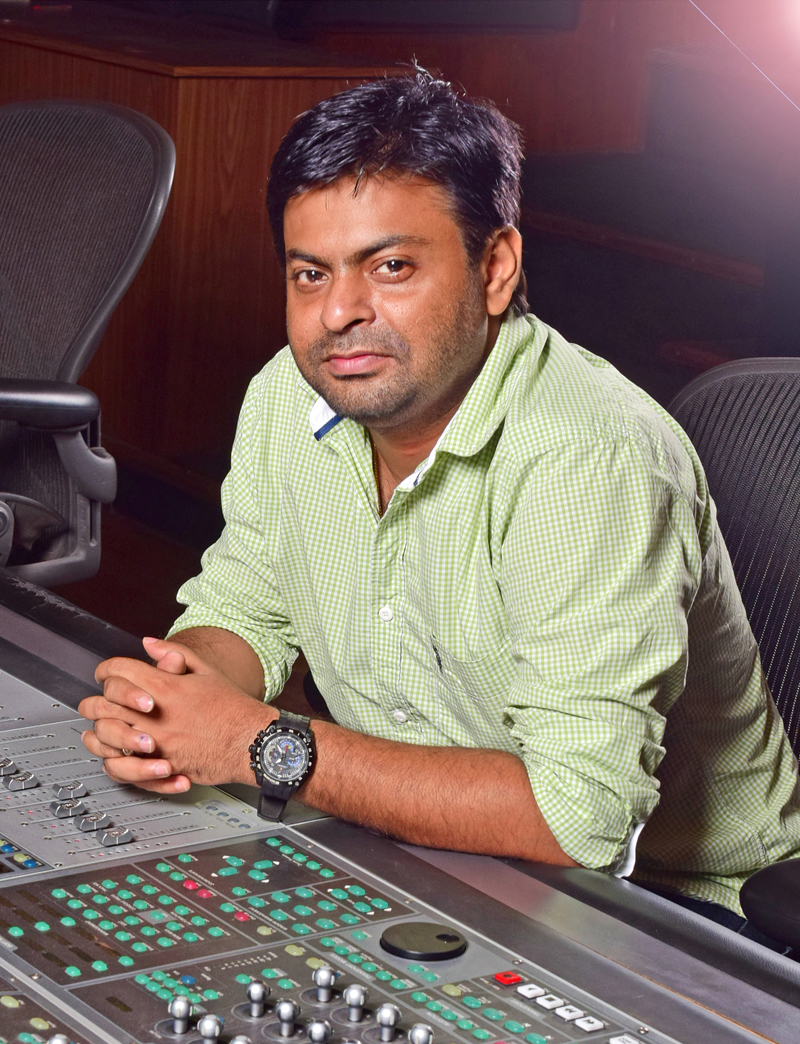
- Justin in 2015
- Born: 11 October 1980 (age 45); Thrissur, Kerala, India
- Education: St. Thomas College, Thrissur
- Occupation: Sound Engineer
- Years active: 2002-present
- Spouse: Lijin Justin (m.2015)
- Children: Aiden Michael Justin
- Awards: National Film Award for Best Audiography

Justin Jose (born 1980) is an Indian Sound Engineer and Sound Mixer. He has worked in Hindi, Bengali, Tamil, Telugu, Marathi, Gujarati, Punjabi, Ladakhi, Latvian, Arab, Urdu and Malayalam films.

== Early life and education ==
Justin Jose was born in Thrissur, Kerala. He graduated in economics from St.Thomas College, Thrissur. He then received his diploma in Audio Recording from Chetana Sound Studio, Thrissur, Kerala. He had also secured 4th grade of electronic keyboard from Trinity College of Music, London. He started his career from music industry.

== Career ==
He moved to Mumbai in 2003 and joined QLabs as ADR Recordist under the ace sound engineer Deepan Chatterjee. In 2005 he became premix engineer for feature films and by 2008 he became independent re-recording mixer. Since then he is working as re-recording mixer for Indian Movies and also on regional language version mix of Hollywood movies totaling to more than 250 films. In 2012 he joined FutureWorks Studio, Mumbai and now he is handling Dolby Atmos surround mix for movies. He mixed Madras Cafe which is the first movie in India to be mixed in native Dolby Atmos. He won National Film Award for the Best Re-recordist for the movie Bajirao Mastani in 2015 and for Walking With The Wind in 2017. His notable works include Baahubali, Padmaavat, Bajirao Mastani, Uri: The Surgical Strike, Bhool Bhulaiyaa 2, Laapataa Ladies, Dhurandhar and Dhurandhar: The Revenge.

== Accolades ==
National Film Awards
Year	Language	Title	Category				
Year	Language	Title	Category	2017	Ladakhi	Walking with the Wind	Best Re-recording Mixer
2015	Hindi	Bajirao Mastani	Best Re-recording Mixer				

State Film Awards
Year	State	Language	Title	Category				
Year	2021	Language	Title	Category	Kerala State Film Awards	Malayalam	Minnal Murali	Best Re-recording Mixer
2018	Goa State Film Awards	Marathi Short	Aaba Aiktaay Naa?	Best Audiographer				

Other Awards & Nominations
Year	Award	Language	Title	Category	Status						
Year	Award	Language	Title	Category	Status	2025	FOI Online Awards, India	Hindi	Dhurandhar	Best Sound Design & Mixing	Nominated
2020	Star Screen Awards	Hindi	Uri: The Surgical Strike	Best Sound Design & Mix	Won						
2020	FOI Online Awards, India	Hindi	Chintu Ka Birthday	Best Sound Design & Mixing	Nominated						
2020	FOI Online Awards, India	Hindi	AK vs AK	Best Sound Design & Mixing	Nominated						
2019	Zee Cine Awards	Hindi	Padmaavat	Best Sound Design & Mix	Won						
2018	Indywood Academy Awards	Hindi	Padmaavat	Best Re-recording Mixer	Won						
2016	Indian Recording Arts Academy Awards (IRAA)	Hindi	Baahubali	Best Sound Mixing	Won						
2014	Western India Motion Pictures Association Awards	Hindi	Madras Cafe	Best Sound Mixing	Won						
2014	Star Guild Awards (Apsara Film Producers Guild Awards)	Hindi	Madras Cafe	Best Sound Mixing	Won						
2010	Zee Gaurav Puraskar	Marathi	Jogwa	Best Sound Design	Nominated						
2008	V. Shantaram Award	Marathi	Jogwa	Best Sound Design	Nominated						

Honours & Recognitions

- 2017 - Indywood Academy Awards - Excellence Award for Sound Mixing several Bollywood films
- 2015 - Archdiocese of Thrissur - Youth Excellence Award

== Filmography ==
Year	Title	Director	Language	Notes	Credit
2026	Daadi Ki Shaadi		Hindi		Atmos Mixer / Re-recording Mixer
2026	Dhabkaaro		Gujarati		Business Technical Head / Re-recording Mixer
2026	Ek Din		Hindi		Re-recording Mixer
2026	Dhurandhar: The Revenge		Hindi		Atmos Mixer / Re-recording Mixer
2026	O' Romeo		Hindi		Atmos Mixer / Re-recording Mixer
2026	Gandhi Talks		Hindi		Atmos Mixer / OTT Re-recording Mixer / Re-recording Mixer
2026	Ikkis		Hindi		Atmos Mixer / Re-recording Mixer
2025	Dhurandhar		Hindi		Atmos Mixer / Re-recording Mixer
2025	Gondhal		Marathi		Re-recording Mixer
2025	Son of Sardaar 2		Hindi		Atmos Mixer / Re-recording Mixer
2025	Vishwaguru		Hindi		Re-recording Mixer
2025	Sarzameen		Hindi		Atmos Mixer / Re-recording Mixer
2025	Kaalidhar Laapata		Hindi		Re-recording Mixer
2025	Maa		Hindi		Atmos Mixer / Re-recording Mixer
2025	Sitaare Zameen Par		Hindi		Atmos Mixer / Re-recording Mixer
2025	Black, White & Gray: Love Kills		Hindi		Sound Designer
2025	The Bhootnii		Hindi		Atmos Mixer / Re-recording Mixer
2025	Mannu Aur Munni Ki Shaadi		Hindi		Atmos Mixer / Re-recording Mixer
2025	Black Warrant		Hindi		Business Head – Dubbing
2025	Fateh		Hindi		Atmos Mixer / Re-recording Mixer
2025	Victor 303		Hindi		Re-recording Mixer
2024	Badtameej Gill		Hindi		Re-recording Mixer
2024	Waack Girls		Hindi		Re-recording Mixer
2024	Freedom at Midnight		Hindi		Re-recording Mixer
2024	The Sabarmati Report		Hindi		Atmos Mixer / Re-recording Mixer (uncredited)
2024	Bhool Bhulaiyaa 3		Hindi		Atmos Mixer / Re-recording Mixer
2024	Vicky Vidya Ka Woh Wala Video		Hindi		Atmos Mixer / Re-recording Mixer
2024	Adbhut		Hindi		Re-recording Mixer
2024	Udan Chhoo		Gujarati		Supervising Re-recording Mixer
2024	Double Ismart		Telugu		Atmos Mixer / Re-recording Mixer / Sound Designer
2024	Vedaa		Hindi		Atmos Mixer / Re-recording Mixer
2024	Bad Cop		Hindi		Re-recording Mixer / Sound Designer
2024	Builder Boys		Gujarati		Supervising Re-recording Mixer
2024	Agents	Aditya Awandhe	Hindi		Re-recording Mixer (Dolby Atmos)
2024	Blackout	Devang Bhavsar	Hindi		Re-recording Mixer (Dolby Atmos)
2024	Savi	Abhinay Deo	Hindi		Re-recording Mixer (Dolby Atmos)
2024	Bhaiyya Ji	Apoorv Singh Karki	Hindi		Re-recording Mixer (Dolby Atmos)
2024	Samandar	Vishal Vada Vala	Hindi		Re-recording Mixer (Dolby Atmos)
2024	The Takht Inc	Aneet Sekhon	Hindi		Re-recording Mixer (Dolby Atmos)
2024	Crew	Rajesh A Krishnan	Hindi		Re-recording Mixer (Dolby Atmos)
2024	Crakk: Jeetega... Toh Jiyegaa	Aditya Datt	Hindi		Re-recording Mixer (Dolby Atmos)
2024	Kasoombo	Vijaygiri Bava	Hindi		Re-recording Mixer (Dolby Atmos)
2024	Main Atal Hoon	Ravi JadhavJaved Karim	Hindi		Re-recording Mixer (Dolby Atmos)
2023	Dunki	Rajkumar Hirani	Hindi		Re-recording Mixer (Dolby Atmos)
2023	Khichdi 2	Aatish Kapadia	Hindi		Re-recording Mixer (Dolby Atmos)
2023	Popaat	Bhavin Trivedi	Hindi		Re-recording Mixer (Dolby Atmos)
2023	Mumbai Diaries	Nikkhil Advani	Hindi		Re-recording Mixer (Dolby Atmos)
2023	Fukrey 3	Mrighdeep Lamba	Hindi		Re-recording Mixer (Dolby Atmos)
2023	Jaane Jaan	Sujoy Ghosh	Hindi		Re-recording Mixer (Dolby Atmos)
2023	Laapataa Ladies	Kiran Rao	Hindi		Re-recording Mixer (Dolby Atmos)
2023	Valatty	Devan Jayakumar	Hindi		Re-recording Mixer (Dolby Atmos)
2023	Adhura	Ananya Banerjee Gauravv K. Chawla	Hindi		Re-recording Mixer (Dolby Atmos)
2023	Jogira Sara Ra Ra	Kushan Nandy	Hindi		Re-recording Mixer (Dolby Atmos)
2023	U Turn	Arif Khan Goswami Mahesh Gari Tulsigiri	Hindi		Re-recording Mixer (Dolby Atmos)
2023	Gaslight	Pavan Kirpalani	Hindi		Re-recording Mixer (Dolby Atmos)
2023	Timir	Atul Kumar Dubey	Hindi		Re-recording Mixer (Dolby Atmos)
2023	Taj: Divided by Blood	Abhimanyu Singh	Hindi		Re-recording Mixer (Dolby Atmos)
2023	Shehzada	Rohit Dhawan	Hindi		Re-recording Mixer (Dolby Atmos)
2023	Aath Aana	Pragyan Chaturvedi	Hindi		Re-recording Mixer (Dolby Atmos)
2023	Ho Ja Mukt	Sumeet Nagdev	Hindi		Re-recording Mixer (Dolby Atmos)
2023	Taaza Khabar	Himank Gaur	Hindi		Re-recording Mixer (Dolby Atmos)
2022	Chabutro	Chanakya Patel Harsh Hudda Prashant M	Hindi		Re-recording Mixer (Dolby Atmos)
2022	Mid Day Meeal	Anil Singh Chandel	Hindi		Re-recording Mixer (Dolby Atmos)
2022	Lost	Aniruddha Roy Chowdhury	Hindi		Re-recording Mixer (Dolby Atmos)
2022	Maarrich	Dhruv Lather	Hindi		Re-recording Mixer (Dolby Atmos)
2022	Prem Geet 3	Chhetan Gurung & Santosh Sen	Hindi		Re-recording Mixer (Dolby Atmos)
2022	Jahaan Chaar Yaar	Kamal Pandey	Hindi		Re-recording Mixer (Dolby Atmos)
2022	Holy Cow	Sai Kabir	Hindi		Re-recording Mixer (Dolby Atmos)
2022	Liger	Puri Jagannadh	Hindi		Re-recording Mixer (Dolby Atmos)
2022	Ek Villain Returns	Mohit Suri	Hindi		Re-recording Mixer (Dolby Atmos)
2022	Khuda Haafiz Chapter 2 Agni Pariksha	Faruk Kabir	Hindi		Re-recording Mixer (Dolby Atmos)
2022	Om - The Battle Within	Kapil Verma	Hindi		Re-recording Mixer (Dolby Atmos)
2022	Nikamma	Sabir Khan	Hindi		Re-recording Mixer (Dolby Atmos)
2022	Prem Prakaran	Chandresh Bhatt	Hindi		Re-recording Mixer (Dolby Atmos)
2022	Dehati Disco	Manoj Sharma	Hindi		Re-recording Mixer (Dolby Atmos)
2022	Adrushya	Kabir Lal	Hindi		Re-recording Mixer (Dolby Atmos)
2022	Bhool Bhulaiyaa 2	Anees Bazmee	Hindi		Re-recording Mixer (Dolby Atmos)
2022	Rocketry: The Nambi Effect	R.Madhavan	Hindi		Re-recording Mixer (Dolby Atmos)
2022	Heropanti 2	Ahmed Khan	Hindi		Re-recording Mixer (Dolby Atmos)
2022	Sharmaji Namkeen	Hitesh Bhatia	Hindi		Re-recording Mixer (Dolby Atmos)
2022	Bachchhan Paandey	Farhad Samji	Hindi		Re-recording Mixer (Dolby Atmos)
2022	A Thursday	Behzad Khambata	Hindi		Re-recording Mixer (Dolby Atmos)
2022	Gehraiyaan	Shakun Batra	Hindi		Re-recording Mixer (Dolby Atmos)
2021	Jogira Sara Ra Ra	Kushan Nandy	Hindi		Re-recording Mixer (Dolby Atmos)
2021	Kun Faya Kun	Kushan Nandy	Hindi		Re-recording Mixer (Dolby Atmos)
2021	R.E.M.	Vishal Mahadkar	Hindi		Re-recording Mixer (Dolby Atmos)
2021	420 IPC	Manish Gupta	Hindi		Re-recording Mixer (Dolby Atmos)
2021	Minnal Murali	Basil Joseph	Malayalam		Re-recording Mixer (Dolby Atmos)
2021	21 Mu Tiffin	Vijaygiri Bava	Hindi		Re-recording Mixer (Dolby Atmos)
2021	Aranyak	Vinay Waikul	Hindi		Re-recording Mixer (Dolby Atmos)
2021	Karkhanisanchi Waari: Ashes on a road trip	Mangesh Joshi	Hindi		Re-recording Mixer (Dolby Atmos)
2021	Dhindora	Bhuvan Bam	Hindi		Re-recording Mixer (Dolby Atmos)
2021	Tadap	Milan Luthria	Hindi		Re-recording Mixer (Dolby Atmos)
2021	Satyameva Jayate 2	Milap Zaveri	Hindi		Re-recording Mixer (Dolby Atmos)
2021	Akkad Bakkad Rafu Chakkar	Raj Kaushal & Aman Khan	Hindi		Re-recording Mixer (Dolby Atmos)
2021	Yes I am Student	Tarnvir Singh Jagpal	Hindi		Re-recording Mixer (Dolby Atmos)
2021	Mumbai Diaries 26/11	Nikkhil Advani	Hindi		Re-recording Mixer (Dolby Atmos)
2021	Comedy Premium League	Mahesh Bhatt	Hindi		Re-recording Mixer (Dolby Atmos)
2021	The Empire	Nikkhil Advani	Hindi		Re-recording Mixer (Dolby Atmos)
2021	Bhuj: The Pride of India	Abhishek Dudhaiya	Hindi		Re-recording Mixer (Dolby Atmos)
2021	Radhe	Prabhu Deva	Hindi		Re-recording Mixer (Dolby Atmos)
2021	Krishnankutty Pani Thudangi	Sooraj Tom	Hindi		Re-recording Mixer (Dolby Atmos)
2021	Hello Charlie	Pankaj Saraswat	Hindi		Re-recording Mixer (Dolby Atmos)
2021	The Big Bull	Kookie Gulati	Hindi		Re-recording Mixer (Dolby Atmos)
2021	Hey Prabhu-2!	Mahesh Bhatt	Hindi		Re-recording Mixer (Dolby Atmos)
2021	Preetam	Sijo Rocky	Hindi		Re-recording Mixer (Dolby Atmos)
2021	Tuesdays and Fridays	Taranveer Singh	Hindi		Re-recording Mixer (Dolby Atmos)
2021	Attention Please	Jithin Issac Thomas	Malayalam		Re-recording Mixer (Dolby Atmos)
2020	AK vs AK	Vikramaditya Motwane	Hindi		Re-recording Mixer (Dolby Atmos)
2020	Coolie No. 1	David Dhawan	Hindi		Re-recording Mixer (Dolby Atmos)
2020	Unpaused	Nikkhil Advani Avinash Arun Tannishtha Chatterjee	Hindi		Re-recording Mixer (Dolby Atmos)
2020	Laxmii	Lawrence Raghavendra	Hindi		Re-recording Mixer (Dolby Atmos)
2020	Ginny Weds Sunny	Puneet Khanna	Hindi		Re-recording Mixer (Dolby Atmos)
2020	Sadak 2	Mahesh Bhatt	Hindi		Re-recording Mixer (Dolby Atmos)
2020	Mango	Abbas Tyrewala	Hindi		Re-recording Mixer
2020	Baaghi 3	Ahmed Khan	Hindi		Re-recording Mixer (Dolby Atmos)
2020	Sarah Thaha Thoufeek	Sarath Kottikkal	English & Malayalam	Documentary	Sound Designer & Re-recording Mixer
2020	Malang	Mohit Suri	Hindi		Re-recording Mixer (Dolby Atmos)
2020	Tanhaji: The Unsung Warrior	Om Raut	Hindi		Re-recording Mixer (Dolby Atmos)
2019	Thambi	Jeethu Joseph	Tamil		Sound Designer & Re-recording Mixer (Dolby Atmos)
2019	Kamala	Ranjith Sankar	Malayalam		Sound Designer & Re-recording Mixer (Dolby Atmos)
2019	Bypass Road	Naman Nitin Mukesh	Hindi		Re-recording Mixer (Dolby Atmos)
2019	Satellite Shankar	Irfan Kamal	Hindi		Re-recording Mixer (Dolby Atmos)
2019	Housefull 4	Farhad Samji	Hindi		Sound Mix
2019	Chintu Ka Birthday	Devanshu Kumar & Satyanshu Singh	Hindi		Re-recording Mixer (Dolby Atmos)
2019	Prassthanam	Deva Katta	Hindi		Re-recording Mixer (Dolby Atmos)
2019	Section 375	Ajay Bahl	Hindi		Re-recording Mixer: Trailer
2019	Montu Ni Bittu	Vijaygiri Bava	Hindi		Re-recording Mixer
2019	Batla House	Nikkhil Advani	Hindi		Re-recording Mixer (Dolby Atmos)
2019	Khandaani Shafakhana	Shilpi Dasgupta	Hindi		Re-recording Mixer: Trailer
2019	Blackia	Sukhminder Dhanjal	Hindi		Re-recording Mixer
2019	Rabb Da Radio 2	Sharan Art	Punjabi		sound mixer supervisor (Uncredited)
2019	Kesari	Anurag Singh	Hindi		Re-recording Mixer (Dolby Atmos)
2019	Nashibvaan	Amol Gole	Marathi		Re-recording Mixer
2019	Uri: The Surgical Strike	Aditya Dhar	Hindi		Re-recording Mixer (Dolby Atmos)
2018	Antariksham 9000 KMPH	Sankalp Reddy	Telugu		Re-recording Mixer (Dolby Atmos)
2018	11 Days	Sudheer Konderi	Arabic		Re-recording Mixer
2018	Baazaar	Gauravv K. Chawla	Hindi		Re-recording Mixer (Dolby Atmos)
2018	Aate Di Chidi	Harry Bhatti	Punjabi		Re-recording Mixer
2018	Jalebi	Pushpdeep Bhardwaj	Hindi		Re-recording Mixer Trailer
2018	Widow of Silence	Praveen Morchhale	Urdu		Re-recording Mixer
2018	Afsar	Gulshan Singh	Punjabi		Re-recording Mixer
2018	Qismat	Jagdeep Sidhu	Punjabi		Re-recording Mixer
2018	Ventilator	Umang Vyas	Gujarati		Re-recording Mixer
2018	Yamla Pagla Deewana: Phir Se	Navaniat Singh	Hindi		Re-recording Mixer (Dolby Atmos)
2018	Gold	Reema Kagti	Hindi		Re-recording Mixer
2018	Sanju	Rajkumar Hirani	Hindi		Re-recording Mixer (Dolby Atmos)
2018	Koode	Anjali Menon	Malayalam		Re-recording Mixer (Dolby Atmos)
2018	Baaghi 2	Ahmed Khan	Hindi		Re-recording Mixer (Dolby Atmos)
2018	Sajjan Singh Rangroot	Pankaj Batra	Punjabi		Re-recording Mixer (Dolby Atmos)
2018	Welcome to New York	Chakri Toleti	Hindi		Re-recording Mixer (Dolby Atmos)
2018	Love Per Square Foot	Anand Tiwari	Hindi	Netflix Movie	Re-recording Mixer
2018	Strawberry Point	Prabal Baruah	Hindi		Re-recording Mixer (Dolby Atmos)
2018	Jaan Jigar: Beloved	Ranjan Chandel	Hindi	Short	Re-recording Mixer
2018	Padmaavat	Sanjay Leela Bansali	Hindi		Re-recording Mixer (Dolby Atmos)
2018	Barayan	Deepak Patil	Marathi		Re-recording Mixer
2017	Punyalan Private Limited	Ranjith Sankar	Malayalam		Re-recording Mixer (Dolby Atmos)
2017	Sardar Mohammad	Harry Bhatti	Punjabi		Re-recording Mixer
2017	Walking With the Wind	Praveen Morchhale	Hindi		Re-recording Mixer
2017	Haseena Parkar	Apoorva Lakhia	Hindi		Re-recording Mixer (Dolby Atmos)
2017	Mukkabaaz	Anurag Kashyap	Hindi		Re-recording Mixer
2017	Poster Boys	Shreyas Talpade	Hindi		Re-recording Mixer (Dolby Atmos)
2017	Munna Michael	Sabbir Khan	Hindi		Re-recording Mixer (Dolby Atmos)
2017	Channa Mereya	Pankaj Batra	Punjabi		Re-recording Mixer
2017	Tubelight	Kabir Khan	Hindi		Re-recording Mixer (Dolby Atmos)
2017	Aaba... Are You Listening?	Aditya Suhas Jambhale	Marathi		Re-recording Mixer
2017	Sachin: A Billion Dreams	James Erskine	Hindi		Re-recording Mixer (Dolby Atmos)
2017	Half Girlfriend	Mohit Suri	Hindi		Re-recording Mixer (Dolby Atmos)
2017	Hindi Medium	Saket Chaudhary	Hindi		Re-recording Mixer (Dolby Atmos)
2017	Maatr	Srijit Mukherji	Hindi		Re-recording Mixer (Dolby Atmos)
2017	Boygiri	Akarsh Khurrana	Hindi	Web Series	Re-recording Mixer
2017	Dev DD	Ken Ghosh	Hindi	Web Series	Re-recording Mixer
2017	Begum Jaan	Ashtar Sayed	Hindi		Re-recording Mixer (Dolby Atmos)
2017	Rabb Da Radio	Tarnvir Singh Jagpal & Harry Bhatti	Punjabi		Re-recording Mixer
2017	Sargi	Neeru Bajwa	Punjabi		Re-recording Mixer
2017	Irada	Aparnaa Singh	Hindi		Re-recording Mixer (Dolby Atmos)
2017	Gautamiputra Satakarni	Krish	Telugu		Re-recording Mixer (Dolby Atmos)
2016	Rock On 2	Shujaat Saudagar	Hindi		Re-recording Mixer
2016	Motu Patlu: King of Kings	Suhas D. Kadav	Hindi		Re-recording Mixer (Dolby Atmos)
2016	Mirzya	Rakeysh Omprakash Mehra	Hindi		Re-recording Mixer (Dolby Atmos)
2016	Oozham	Jeethu Joseph	Malayalam		Re-recording Mixer (Dolby Atmos)
2016	Pretham	Ranjith Shankar	Malayalam		Re-recording Mixer (Dolby Atmos)
2016	Mohenjo Daro	Ashutosh Gowariker	Hindi		Re-recording Mixer (Dolby Atmos)
2016	Udta Punjab	Abhishek Chaubey	Hindi		Re-recording Mixer (Dolby Atmos)
2016	Sarbjit	Omung Kumar	Hindi		Re-recording Mixer (Dolby Atmos)
2016	Azhar	Tony D'Souza	Hindi		Re-recording Mixer : Teaser
2016	Baaghi	Sabbir Khan	Hindi		Re-recording Mixer (Dolby Atmos)
2016	Kapoor & Sons (Since 1921)	Shakun Batra	Hindi		Re-recording Mixer (Dolby Atmos)
2016	Channo Kamli Yaar Di	Pankaj Batra	Punjabi		Re-recording Mixer (Dolby Atmos)
2016	Sanam Teri Kasam	Radhika Rao & Vinay Sapru	Hindi		Re-recording Mixer (Dolby Atmos)
2016	Airlift	Raja Krishna Menon	Hindi		Re-recording Mixer (Dolby Atmos)
2016	Wazir	Bejoy Nambiar	Hindi		Re-recording Mixer (Dolby Atmos)
2015	Time Machine	Arati Kadav	Hindi	Short	Re-recording Mixer
2015	Global Baba	Manoj Sidheshwari Tewari	Hindi		Re-recording Mixer
2015	Mango	Abbas Tyrewala	Hindi		Re-recording Mixer
2015	Bajirao Mastani	Sanjay Leela Bhansali	Hindi		Re-recording Mixer (Dolby Atmos)
2015	Tamasha	Imtiaz Ali	Hindi		Dolby Atmos Mixer: Trailer
2015	Four Pillars of Basement	Giresh Naik K	Hindi		Re-recording Mixer
2015	Kanche	Krish	Telugu		Re-recording Mixer (Dolby Atmos)
2015	Shareek	Navaniat Singh	Punjabi		Re-recording Mixer
2015	Hero	Nikhil Advani	Hindi		Re-recording Mixer (Dolby Atmos)
2015	Bajrangi Bhaijaan	Kabir Khan	Hindi		Sound Re-recording Mixer: Trailer
2015	Baahubali	S.S Rajamouli	Telugu		Re-recording Mixer (Dolby Atmos)
2015	Welcome 2 Karachi	Ashish R Mohan	Hindi, Urdu		Re-recording Mixer (Dolby Atmos)
2015	Time Machine	Arati Kadav	Hindi	Short	Re-recording Mixer
2015	Bombay Velvet	Anurag Kashyap	Hindi		Re-recording Mixer (Dolby Atmos)
2015	Barkhaa	Shadaab Mirza	Hindi		Re-recording Mixer
2015	Roy	Vikramjit Singh	Hindi		Re-recording Mixer (Dolby Atmos)
2015	Lorai:Play to Live	Parambrata Chatterjee	Hindi		Re-recording Mixer
2014	Happy New Year	Farah Khan	Hindi	Foreign language versions	Re-recording Mixer
2014	Sonali Cable	Charudutt Acharya	Hindi		Re-recording Mixer
2014	Bang Bang!	Siddharth Anand	Hindi		Re-recording Mixer
2014	Finding Fanny	Homi Adajania	Hindi		Re-recording Mixer
2014	Izlaiduma gads	Andris Gauja	Latvian / Russian		Re-recording Mixer
2014	M Cream	Agneya Singh, Aban Raza	English		Re-recording Mixer
2014	Njan Steve Lopez	Rajeev Ravi	Malayalam		Re-recording Mixer
2014	Kick	Sajid Nadiadwala	Hindi		Re-recording Mixer (Dolby Atmos)
2014	Punjab 1984	Anurag Singh	Punjabi		Re-recording Mixer
2014	Mundeyan Ton Bachke Rahin	Navinder Pal Singh	Punjabi		Re-recording Mixer
2014	Hawaa Hawaai	Amole Gupte	Hindi		Re-recording Mixer
2014	Revolver Rani	Sai Kabir Shrivastav	Hindi		Re-recording Mixer
2014	Yellow	Mahesh Limaye	Marathi		Re-recording Mixer
2014	Station	Saad Khan	Hindi		Re-recording Mixer
2014	Robocop	José Padilha	English		Version Re-recording Mixer
2014	Timepass	Ravi Jadhav	Marathi		Re-recording Mixer
2013	Jackpot	Kaizad Gustad	Hindi		Re-recording Mixer
2013	Warning	Gurmmeet Singh	Hindi		Re-recording Mixer
2013	Madras Cafe	Shoojit Sircar	Hindi	First native mix in Dolby Atmos	Re-recording Mixer (Dolby Atmos)
2013	D-Day	Nikhil Advani	Hindi		Re-recording Mixer (Dolby Atmos)
2013	Bhaag Milkha Bhaag	Rakeysh Omprakash Mehra	Hindi		Re-recording Mixer (Dolby Atmos)
2013	White House Down	Roland Emmerich	English		Version Re-recording Mixer
2013	Ghanchakkar	Rajkumar Gupta	Hindi		Re-recording Mixer (Dolby Atmos)
2013	Oye Hoye Pyar Ho Gaya	Aditya Sood	Punjabi		Re-recording Mixer
2013	Shootout at Wadala	Sanjay Gupta	Hindi		Re-recording Mixer (Dolby Atmos)
2013	Commando	Dilip Ghosh	Hindi		Re-recording Mixer (Dolby Atmos)
2013	Nautanki Saala!	Rohan Sippy	Hindi		Re-recording Mixer (Dolby Atmos)
2013	Aatma	Suparn Verma	Hindi		Re-recording Mixer (Dolby Atmos)
2013	ABCD: Any Body Can Dance	Remo D'Souza	Hindi		Re-recording Mixer (Dolby Atmos)
2013	Inkaar	Sudhir Mishra	Hindi	Additional re-recording mixer	Re-recording Mixer
2012	Luv Shuv Tey Chicken Khurana	Sameer Sharma	Hindi		Re-recording Mixer
2012	Skyfall	Sam Mendes	English		Version Re-recording Mixer
2012	English Vinglish	Gauri Shinde	Hindi		Surround music mixer
2012	Premium Rush	David Koepp	English		Version Re-recording Mixer
2012	Total Recall	Len Wiseman	English		Version Re-recording Mixer
2012	Cinema Company	Mamas K Chandran	Malayalam		Re-recording Mixer
2012	The Amazing Spider-Man	Marc Webb	English		Version Re-recording Mixer
2012	Second Show	Srinath Rajendran	Malayalam		Re-recording Mixer
2011	Ghost Rider: Spirit of Vengeance	Neveldine/Taylor	English		Version Re-recording Mixer
2011	The Adventures of Tintin	Steven Spielberg	English		Version Re-recording Mixer
2011	The Smurfs	Raja Gosnell	English		Version Re-recording Mixer
2011	Battle: Los Angeles	Jonathan Liebesman	English		Version Re-recording Mixer
2011	The Green Hornet	Michel Gondry	English		Version Re-recording Mixer
2010	The Tourist	Florian Henckel von Donnersmarck	English French Italian		Version Re-recording Mixer
2010	Tron: Legacy	Joseph Kosinski	English		Version Re-recording Mixer
2010	Autograph	Srijit Mukherji	Bengali		Re-recording Mixer
2010	I Am Afia Megha Abhimanyu Omar	Onir	Hindi, Bengali		Re-recording Mixer
2010	Memories in March	Sanjoy Nag	Bengali		Re-recording Mixer
2010	Byomkesh Bakshi	Anjan Dutt	Bengali		Re-recording Mixer
2010	SALT	Phillip Noyce	English		Version Re-recording Mixer
2010	The Karate Kid	Harald Zwart	English		Version Re-recording Mixer
2010	Prince of Persia: The Sands of Time	Mike Newell	English		Version Re-recording Mixer
2010	Ekam: Son of Soil	Mandeep Benipal	Punjabi		Sound Editor & Re-recording Mixer
2010	Hello Zindagi	Raja Unnithan	Hindi		Associate re-recording Mixer
2009	2012	Roland Emmerich	English		Version Re-recording Mixer
2009	Jogwa	Rajiv Patil	Marathi	5 National Film Awards	Re-recording Mixer
2009	Abohoman	Rituparno Ghosh	Bengali	4 National Film Awards	Re-recording Mixer
2009	The Taking of Pelham 123	Tony Scott	English		Version Re-recording Mixer
2009	Madly Bangalee	Anjan Dutt	Bengali		Re-recording Mixer
2009	Angels & Demons	Ron Howard	English		Version Re-recording Mixer
2009	Coffee House	Gurbir Singh Grewal	Hindi		Associate re-recording Mixer
2009	Race to Witch Mountain	Andy Fickman	English		Version Re-recording Mixer
2009	The Stoneman Murders	Manish Gupta	Hindi		Re-recording Mixer
2009	Antaheen	Aniruddha Roy Chowdhury	Bengali		Re-recording Mixer
2008	Meerabai Not Out	Chandrakant Kulkarni	Hindi		Associate re-recording Mixer
2008	Oye Lucky! Lucky Oye!	Dibakar Banerjee	Hindi		Associate re-recording Mixer
2008	Bolt	Chris Williams & Byron Howard	English	Foreign Language Mix	Re-recording Mixer
2008	Quantum of Solace	Marc Forster	English		Version Re-recording Mixer
2008	Chamku	Kabeer Kaushik	Hindi		Associate re-recording Mixer
2008	Homam	J. D. Chakravarthy	Telugu		Re-recording Mixer
2008	Ugly Aur Pagli	Sachin Khot	Hindi		Associate re-recording Mixer
2008	Khela	Rituparno Ghosh	Bengali		Associate re-recording Mixer
2008	Hancock	Peter Berg	English		Version Re-recording Mixer
2008	You Don't Mess with the Zohan	Dennis Dugan	English		Version Re-recording Mixer
2008	Vantage Point	Pete Travis	English		Version Re-recording Mixer
2007	Saawariya	Sanjay Leela Bhansali	Hindi		Post-production sound: additional
2007	It's Breaking News	Vishal Inamdar	Hindi		Associate re-recording Mixer
2007	Darling	Ram Gopal Varma	Hindi		Associate re-recording Mixer
2007	Gandhi, My Father	Feroz Abbas Khan	Hindi		Surround Music Mixer
2007	MP3: Mera Pehla Pehla Pyaar	Robby Grewa	Hindi		Associate re-recording Mixer
2007	Spider-Man 3	Sam Raimi	English		Version Re-recording Mixer
2007	1971	Amrit Sagar	Hindi		Assistant re-recording Mixer
2007	The Messengers	Pang Brothers	English		Version Re-recording Mixer
2007	Traffic Signal	Madhur Bhandarkar	Hindi		Assistant re-recording Mixer
2006	Ghost Rider	Mark Steven Johnson	English		Version Re-recording Mixer
2006	Casino Royale	Martin Campbell	English		Version Re-recording Mixer
2006	The Grudge 2	Takashi Shimizu	English		Version Re-recording Mixer
2006	Bhoot Unkle	Mukesh Saigal	Hindi		Assistant re-recording Mixer
2006	Mannat	Gurbir Singh Grewal	Punjabi		Assistant re-recording Mixer
2006	Open Season	Jill Culton & Roger Allers	English		Version Re-recording Mixer
2006	Khosla Ka Ghosla	Dibakar Banerjee	Hindi		Assistant re-recording Mixer
2006	Snakes on a Plane	David R. Ellis	English		Re-recording Mixer
2006	Bas Ek Pal	Onir	Hindi		Assistant re-recording Mixer
2006	Zinda	Sanjay Gupta	Hindi		Surround Music Mixer
2005	Anjaane	Harry W. Fernandes	Hindi		Assistant re-recording Mixer
2005	Bluffmaster!	Rohan Sippy	Hindi		Music Mixing Assistant
2005	Iqbal	Nagesh Kukunoor	Hindi		assistant sound re-recording mixer
2005	Hridayathil Sookshikkan	Rajesh Pillai	Malayalam		Assistant sound recordist
2004	Pokémon: Destiny Deoxys	Kunihiko Yuyama	English		Version Re-recording Mixer
2004	Spider-Man 2	Sam Raimi	English		Version Re-recording Mixer
2004	Vajram	Pramod Pappan	Malayalam		Assistant sound recordist
2004	Vismayathumbathu	Fazil	Malayalam		Assistant sound recordist
2004	Kerala House Udan Vilpanakku	Thaha	Malayalam		Assistant sound recordist
2003	Mullavalliyum Thenmavum	V. K. Prakash	Malayalam		Assistant sound recordist
2003	Swapnakoodu	Kamal	Malayalam		Assistant sound recordist
2003	Vellithira	Bhadran	Malayalam		Assistant sound recordist
2003	Sadanandante Samayam	Akku Akbar, Aby Jose	Malayalam		Assistant sound recordist
2003	Mr. Brahmachari	Thulasidas	Malayalam		Assistant sound recordist
2002	Kattuchembakam	Vinayan	Malayalam		Assistant sound recordist
2002	Oomappenninu Uriyadappayyan	Vinayan	Malayalam		Assistant sound recordist
2002	Nammal	Kamal	Malayalam		Assistant sound recordist
