= Santhosh Varma =

Indian lyricist and writer

- Occupations: Lyricist; screenwriter
- Years active: 2004–present

Santhosh Varma is an Indian lyricist and writer who primarily works in the Malayalam film industry. He has written lyrics for films such as Drishyam, Big B, Salt N' Pepper, and Njandukalude Naattil Oridavela.

== Career ==
Varma began composing content for All India Radio (Akashvani) on the Hindi Yuvavani program and writing songs for television serials. Though his debut film project was *Freedom* by Thampi Kannanthanam, his first released song appeared in Alex Paul’s Chathikkatha Chanthu (2004). In addition to his work as a lyricist, Santosh Varma made a cameo appearance in the 2015 film Su Su Sudhi Vathmeekam.

== Creative process ==
Varma is noted for a tune-first approach to songwriting, wherein the lyrics are written after the musical composition is complete.

== Filmography ==
Year	Title (Film)	Song
2004	Chathikkatha Chanthu	Love Love Love Letter – F
2004	Chathikkatha Chanthu	Love Love Love Letter – M
2005	Pandippada	Ponkanav Minukkum
2006	Oruvan	Theepori Kannilunde
2007	Inspector Garud	Kantharippenne Kantharippenne
2007	Big B	Vida parayukayano
2009	Daddy Cool	Daddy My Daddy
2009	Daddy Cool	Samba Salsa Samba Salsa
2009	Duplicate	Kazhikan rasamulla kalyanam
2009	Duplicate	Nurayunnoru surayane
2009	Sagar Alias Jacky	Osama
2010	24 Hours	Twenty Four (Theme)
2010	Apoorvaragam	Aathira raakkuttilil
2010	Apoorvaragam	Maanathe meenaaril
2010	Apoorvaragam	Noolillapattangal
2010	Cocktail	Vennilavinum ivide
2010	Chaverpada	Onnaam kunnathe
2010	Chaverpada	Ormakale mayaruthe
2010	Chaverpada	Ormakale mayaruthe (Female)
2010	Best Actor	Swapnamoru chaak
2010	Best Actor	Kanal malayude
2010	Best of Luck	Aakaashathe Malli
2010	Best of Luck	Chinnakuzhal Oothikkuyil
2010	Holidays	Holidays
2011	Oru Marubhoomi Kadha	Manassu Mayakki Aale Kudukkana
2011	Oru Marubhoomi Kadha	Gopabalan Nishthamee
2011	Ithu Nammude Katha	Vellarikka
2011	Ithu Nammude Katha	Olakkili Kuzhaloothi
2011	Uppukandam Brothers Back in Action	Ishtam Ninnishtam
2011	Uppukandam Brothers Back in Action	Thilakkam Vecha
2011	Uppukandam Brothers Back in Action	Sharoneen Geetham
2011	China Town	Innu Penninnu
2011	Janapriyan	Le Le Thoo Sara
2011	Janapriyan	Erivenal Povukayaayi
2011	Janapriyan	Pookaithe Nin
2011	Janapriyan	Doore Kizhakke Maanam Chemme Chuvakkum Neram
2011	Janapriyan	Nanmakaalerum Naadunar
2011	Mohabbath	Chantham Thikannoru Pennival
2011	Violin	Ente Mohangellam
2011	Seniors	Neram Thettippoyaalo
2011	Seniors	Aaraamam Nirannje
2011	Seniors	Ithiri Chakkara
2011	Sevens	Kaalamonnu Kaalal
2011	Sevens	Orey Kina Malarodam
2011	Salt & Pepper	Kaanamullaal Ulnirum
2012	Achante Aanmakkal	Velli Veyilum
2012	Asuravithu	Kodungattaayi
2012	Orkut Oru Ormakkoottu	Mazhavill Thoni
2012	Orkut Oru Ormakkoottu	Ambadi Thannilor Ammayundangane
2012	Cobra (Co Brothers)	Paattu Paattu Paattu
2012	Cobra (Co Brothers)	Ente Nenchinullil
2012	Jawan of Vellimala	Ozhuki Njaan
2012	Doctor Innocentanu	Vighnesha Janani
2012	Doctor Innocentanu	Sneham Pookkum Theeram
2012	Doctor Innocentanu	Sundara Keralam Namalkku
2012	Thappana	Oorum Perum
2012	The Hit List	"Kathakalum Ezhuthi"
2012	The Hit List	"Maanathe Vellikkinnathil"
2012	Padmashree Bharat Dr. Saroj Kumar	Iniyoru Chalanam Chalanam
2012	Perinoru Makan	Koovalappoo
2012	Perinoru Makan	Othiri Othiri
2012	Perinoru Makan	Nanmayaayi (M)
2012	Face 2 Face	Kanal Njaan
2012	Face 2 Face	Chik Chik Chirakil
2012	Maantrikan	Aalolam Thedunna
2012	Maantrikan	Swarnnatherileeri
2012	Maantrikan	Mukundante Vesham
2012	Mr. Marumakan	Anganamaare
2012	Mr. Marumakan	Nee Pedamaanin
2012	My Boss	Kuttanadan Punchanile
2012	My Boss	Sooryane Kaithodan
2012	My Boss	Unaretti Nee
2012	My Boss	Freedom Ka Sonayi
2012	Vaadhyar	Kunnolam
2012	Shikari	Karimukile
2012	Cinema Company	Sony Lagdi
2012	Cinema Company	Palavazhi Ozhukiya
2013	Proprietors: Kammath & Kammath	Ninte Pinnale Nadannathil
2013	Proprietors: Kammath & Kammath	Saada Dosa Kall Dosa
2013	Proprietors: Kammath & Kammath	Koyambathoor Naattile
2013	Proprietors: Kammath & Kammath	Kaattadi Kaattadi Neeyaanen
2013	72 Model	Kuyilinte Paattu Ketto
2013	72 Model	Veyilpraave Nee Parannetho
2013	72 Model	Taxi Car Taxi Car
2013	Isaac Newton S/O Philipose	Padavaalum Parichayum
2013	Climax	Mayangaan Kazhiyilla
2013	Climax	Thaamarappookaikalaal
2013	Drishyam	Nizhale Nizhale
2013	Drishyam	Maarivil Kuda Neerthum
2013	Drishyam	Nizhale Nizhale Evide
2013	Neram	Njaan Uyarnnu Pokum
2013	Neram	Vaathil Melle Thurannoru
2013	Neram	Thakathakathakachuvadatithaalamod
2013	Pattam Pole	Mazhaye Thoomazhaye
2013	Pattam Pole	Hey Vennila Pooppeeliniytti
2013	Pattam Pole	Kannil Kannilonnu Nokki
2013	Pigman	Kulirormmakal Than Poombuzhayil
2013	Punyalan Agarbathis	Aashichavan Aakashaththonnoraane Kittiye
2013	Punyalan Agarbathis	Poorangadey Poormulloru Naadu
2013	Buddy	Nee En Mizhikalil
2013	Blackberry	Oru Cherumalarinu Maathram
2013	Blackberry	Neelakannulla Maane
2013	Blackberry	Avani Ponpulari
2013	Zachariayude Garbhinikal	Aakasham Vannallo
2013	Zachariayude Garbhinikal	Ee Khalbitha Swapnathin
2013	Maniback Policy	Panathinu Mele
2013	Mad Dad	Manathe Vellithinkal
2013	Mad Dad	Jamjamjam Jaambavante Kaalam
2013	Mad Dad	Ammathinkal Painkili
2013	Mad Dad	Oru Naalum Piriyathe
2013	Red Wine	Ilam Veyil Thalodave
2013	Red Wine	Neelakasha Kaividum
2013	Radio Jockey	Paattukondoru Then Puzha
2013	Radio Jockey	Thamarappoomazhakalam
2013	SIM	Kaanan Njanennum
2013	SIM	Poovala Poovala
2013	Housefull	Kalyanamaane Kalamozhi Mainaykku
2014	1983	Thalavettam Kaanumpol
2014	1983	Nenjile Nenjile
2014	Njangalude Veettile Athidhikal	Mazhavil Thundupole
2014	Day Night Game	Thaanaro Thanna Thannanaaraaro
2014	Bangalore Days	Thumbippenne
2014	Bangalore Days	Pachakkilikkoru Koodu (Mangalyam)
2014	Bangalore Days	Kannum Chimmi Kannum Chimmi
2014	Bangalore Days	Ente Kannil Ninakkaayorukkiya
2014	Bhayya Bhayya	Veyil Poyaal
2014	Bhayya Bhayya	Bhayya Bhayya
2014	Manglish	English Manglish
2014	Manglish	Saayippe Salaam
2014	Manglish	Ulla Ulla Ulla
2014	Manja	Urulunnu Shakadam
2014	Manja	Pattam Nokki Paanju
2014	Law Point	Evideyo Evideyo
2014	Law Point	Oru Mozhi Mintaathe Pranayam
2014	Vikramadithyan	Mazhanila Kulirumaayi
2014	Vellimoonga	Vellaaram Kannulla Vellimoonga
2014	Vellimoonga	Maavelykku Sesham
2014	Varsham	Karimukilukal Chiraku Kudayum
2014	Samsaaram Aarogyathinu Haanikaram	Thammiloru Vaakku Mintaathe
2014	Samsaaram Aarogyathinu Haanikaram	Ullinnullile Puzhamele
2014	Salala Mobiles	Ee Mohabathin
2014	Happy Journey	Maiyya More Maiyya More
2014	Homely Meals	Velicham Virinju
2014	Homely Meals	Karaviruthin Kala
2014	Homely Meals	Parannu Puthiya Lokangal
2015	100 Days of Love	Manjiloode Vannu
2015	32am Adhyayam 23am Vaakyam	Thaazhe Veenunuvo
2015	KL10 Pathu	Enthaanu Khalbe
2015	KL10 Pathu	Duniyaavin Maithaanath
2015	Achaa Din	Kizhakkinte Ullam
2015	Achaa Din	Naattiloode Kaliyaadi
2015	Amar Akbar Anthony	Manjaatum Maamala
2015	Chandrettan Evideya	Vasanthamallike
2015	Chandrettan Evideya	Kinnaavin Kilikal
2015	Charlie	Sundari Penne
2015	Charlie	Chithirathira
2015	Jalebi	Cycle Vannu Belladichu
2015	Jo and the Boy	Do Do Doo
2015	Jo and the Boy	Aadi Varam
2015	Jo and the Boy	Pinchomal Nenchil
2015	Jo and the Boy	Ponveyil Veezhave
2015	John Honai	Manikyam Pole
2015	John Honai	Onnum Parayille
2015	Nirnaayakam	Minnaminunge
2015	Nirnaayakam	Venpakal Kili
2015	Nirnaayakam	Ilaveyil Chirakumaayi
2015	Nellikka	Swapnachirakil Onnaayi
2015	Madhura Naranga	Ee Koottile
2015	Madhura Naranga	O Thirayukaayano
2015	Madhura Naranga	Oru Naal Ini
2015	Mariyam Mukku	Kavilappil Othavara Mizhi
2015	Rajamma@Yahoo	Meghamani Kudayude Thazhe
2015	Life of Josutty	Kettu Njaan
2015	Life of Josutty	Mele Mele (D)
2015	Life of Josutty	Kettu Njaan (D)
2015	Life of Josutty	Kaalame
2015	Life of Josutty	Mele Mele ..
2015	Vishwasam Athalle Ellaam	Vishwasam Athalle
2015	Su Su Sudhi Vathmeekam	Raavinte Vaathmeekathil
2015	Su Su Sudhi Vathmeekam	Ente Janalarikilinn
2015	Su Su Sudhi Vathmeekam	Kaayaampoo Niramaayi
2016	Action Hero Biju	Pookkal Panineer
2016	Action Hero Biju	Oonjalilaadi Vanna
2016	Ith Thanda Police	Othe Othe Othe
2016	Ith Thanda Police	Vayya Vayya Vayya
2016	Oozham	Ee Yaathrayil
2016	Kattappanayile Rithwik Roshan	Minnaminnikku
2016	Kattappanayile Rithwik Roshan	Parudaya Mariyame
2016	Pa.Va	Podimeesha
2016	Pa.Va	Kalyanam Kalyanam
2016	Maheshinte Prathikaaram	Cherupunchiriyinnale
2016	Welcome to Central Jail	Bye Bye Bye
2016	Welcome to Central Jail	Enthaanen Manassile
2016	Welcome to Central Jail	Sundari...
2016	Swarna Kaduva	Mailanchimedu Vaazhum
2017	Ayal Jeevichirippundu	Aaro Ee Yathra
2017	Adam Joan	Arikil Inni Njan
2017	Udaharanam Sujatha	Unarukayaano
2017	Udaharanam Sujatha	Pennale Pennaale
2017	Udaharanam Sujatha	Nee njangade
2017	Udaharanam Sujatha	Kanakku
2017	Abby	Puthan Sooryan
2017	Abby	Laisa Ailesa
2017	Oru Cinemakkaran	Kannake Mazhavillu
2017	Oru Cinemakkaran	Angotto Ingotto
2017	Kadam Katha	Palamaathiri
2017	Njandukalude Nattil Oridavela	Enthavo
2017	Njandukalude Nattil Oridavela	Nanavere
2017	Punyalan Private Limited	Poorangalude
2017	Punyalan Private Limited	Naalu Kombulla
2017	Pullikaran Staraa	Ttap Ttap
2017	Paipin Chuvattile Pranayam	Kayalirambile
2017	Paipin Chuvattile Pranayam	Aarini Aarini
2017	Masterpiece	Dhinam Dhinam
2017	Masterpiece	Wakeup Wakeup
2017	Melle	Punchappaadathe
2017	Ramante Eden Thottam	Kavitha Ezuthunnu
2017	Ramante Eden Thottam	Maavila Kudil
2017	Ramante Eden Thottam	Akaleyoru
2017	Lakshyam	Kaatu Vannuvo
2017	Vishwavikhyaatharaaya Payyanmaar	Thaa Theyyam
2017	Velipaadinte Pusthakam	Kadalum Karayum Pol
2017	Varnyathil Aashanka	Kalladhi Kallan
2017	Sakhavu	Udichuyarnne
2017	Honey Bee 2 Celebrations	Nummade Kochi
2017	Honey Bee 2 Celebrations	Kinnaavano
2017	Honey Bee 2 Celebrations	Jillam Jillam Jillala
2017	Honey Bee 2 Celebrations	Ormakal
2017	Hello Dubaikkaran	Oru Neram Kandillenkil
2017	Hello Dubaikkaran	Jeelay Thu
2018	369	Irulalla Than
2018	Aadhi	Piriyum Naam
2018	Aadhi	Sooryane
2018	Oru Ayiram Kinakkalal	Ellam Okke
2018	Oru Ayiram Kinakkalal	Aaha
2018	Oru Ayiram Kinakkalal	Oru Ayiram Pon
2018	Njan Marykutty	Doore Doore
2018	Njan Marykutty	Penninullil
2018	Njan Marykutty	Ennullil
2018	Njan Marykutty	Kaana Kadalassilaaro
2018	Njan Marykutty	Cherupulliyuduppitta
2018	Njan Marykutty	Uyaran Padaran
2018	Njan Marykutty	Thirakalethire Vannaalum
2018	Njan Marykutty	Oru Kochu Kumbilanennakilum
2018	Theetta Rappai	Kummatti Koottavum
2018	Theetta Rappai	Doore Maññuvo
2018	Theetta Rappai	Thrissurkare
2018	Theetta Rappai	Doore Maññuvo
2018	Daivame Kaithozham K. Kumarakanam	Kalyanam Swapnathil
2018	Daivame Kaithozham K. Kumarakanam	Daivame Kaithozham
2018	Neerali	Kadannam
2018	Neerali	Kannaane Kannalaane
2018	Panchavarnathatha	Varika Rasikaa
2018	Panchavarnathatha	Panchavarnathatha
2018	Panchavarnathatha	Pokaayaay
2018	Rosapoo	Munniloru Swargam
2018	Rosapoo	Rosapoo
2018	Rosapoo	Kocchiloru
2018	Rosapoo	Padinjattodiyal
2018	Shikkari Shambhu	Thaaram
2018	Shikkari Shambhu	Kaana Chempakappoo
2018	Shikkari Shambhu	Mazha
2018	Shikkari Shambhu	Tharathathara Moolana
2019	Under World	Arike Naam
2019	Aadyarathri	Njanennum Kinaavu Kandoorente
2019	Aadyarathri	Maayanagaram
2019	Ittimani Made in China	Bomma Bomma
2019	Ittimani Made in China	Kunjade Ninte Manassil
2019	Ittimani Made in China	Kando Kando Innolam
2019	Ittimani Made in China	Give Me Money
2019	Ilayaraja	Kappalandi
2019	Ilayaraja	Cheru Cheru
2019	Oru Kattil... Oru Paykappal	Neelakkayal
2019	Oru Kattil... Oru Paykappal	Kaayal Olam
2019	Oru Kattil... Oru Paykappal	Onnam Aanikk
2019	Oru Yamandan Premakadha	Vandippin Maalore
2019	Oru Yamandan Premakadha	Muttathe Kombile Pennu
2019	Ganagandharvan	Aalu Kolum
2019	Ganagandharvan	Unth Paattu
2019	Chila NewGen Nattuvisheshangal	Aval Ente Kannaayi Marendaval
2019	Chila NewGen Nattuvisheshangal	Naranayi Janichathu Moolam
2019	Chila NewGen Nattuvisheshangal	Surangana Sumavadana
2019	Jimmy Ee Veedinte Aishwaryam	Super Sundaran
2019	Jimmy Ee Veedinte Aishwaryam	Uttamarayavar
2019	Jimmy Ee Veedinte Aishwaryam	Title Gaanam - Dubai
2019	Jimmy Ee Veedinte Aishwaryam	Kannale Kanmaniye
2019	Driving Licence	Njaan Thedum Thaaram
2019	Thenkashikatte	Aarum Kaanathe
2019	Thenkashikatte	Thenikkaate
2019	Poozhikkadakan	Poozhikkadakan
2019	Poozhikkadakan	Mazha Vannu
2019	Fancy Dress	Aattam Maarattam
2019	Mera Naam Shaji	Marhaba
2019	Mera Naam Shaji	Manasukkulle Enthenne
2019	Mera Naam Shaji	Manasukkulle Enthenne Manasukkulle
2019	My Santa	O Bul Bul Bulama
2019	My Santa	Velli Panji
2019	My Santa	Velli Panji Kottittu
2019	Love Action Drama	Aalolam
2019	Vikruthi	Kaanumpol Kaanumpol
2019	Vikruthi	Chillayile Thoomanjil
2019	Vikruthi	Ividoru Chankil
2019	Happy Sardar	Shaadi Mein Aana
2020	Thallumpidi	Ottakkirunnalen Manassil
2020	Big Brother	Kalamaanodishtam Koodaan
2020	Varane Avashyamundu	Kuttikkurumba
2020	Varane Avashyamundu	Muthunne Kannukalil Chennai Ponpulari
2020	Varane Avashyamundu	Muthunne Kannukalil
2020	Varane Avashyamundu	Mathi Kanna Ullathu Chollaan
2020	Varane Avashyamundu	Nee Vaa En Arumugha
2020	Varane Avashyamundu	Aadyamorilam Thalodalaayi
2020	Varane Avashyamundu	Mullappoove Ninne Polum
2020	Varane Avashyamundu	Muthunne Kannukalil
2021	Ice Orathi	Pularikal Sandhyakal
2021	Kunjeldho	Manassu Nannakette
2021	Chiri	Paadaan Thonnum Paadum Naadanpaattu
2021	Black Coffee	Poyi Maranja
2022	Aanapparambile World Cup	Aazhi Neeraazhi
2022	Ikkaka	Anthivaanin Mukharam Chonnathu
2022	Kaduva	Paalvarnnakuthiramel
2022	Kaduva	Paalvarnnakuthiramel
2022	Kaduva	Paalaappalli Thiruppalli
2022	Kaduva	Kudamattam Palliyude Kurishinmel
2022	Kaapa	Thiru Thiru Thiruvananthapurath
2022	Kochal	Illa Mazha Chaatin Kulir
2022	Kochal	Naaladi Mathiyeda
2022	Palthu Janwar	Pinchu Paithal
2022	Four	Poli Poli Poli Poove
2022	Malikappuram	Kaliyuga
2022	Malikappuram	Ganapathi Thunayaruluka
2022	Malikappuram	Ambadi Thumbi
2022	Malikappuram	Onnaam Padi Mele
2022	Malikappuram	Kaliyuga
2022	Vaamanan	Aakaashappoo Choodum Mettil
2022	Vaamanan	Sooryanakkale
2022	Vaamanan	Idanenchil
2022	Haya	Koode Ozhukivaa Kaate
2023	Antony	Jonikutty Jaymese
2023	Kallanum Bhagavathiyum	Nanmayulla Naadu
2023	Kallanum Bhagavathiyum	Marakkilla Njaanente
2023	Kallanum Bhagavathiyum	Kaalithozhuthil (Carol Gaanam)
2023	Jinn	O Manuja Povuka Nee
2024	Chithini	Shailanandini
2025	Pariwar (2025 film)	Enthaannennariyilla
2025	Pariwar (2025 film)	Aakaasham Ariyaathe
2025	Pralayashesham Oru Jalakanyaka	Onnadichaal

== Awards ==
- South Indian International Movie Awards(SIIMA) 2017– Best Lyricist, Malayalam for "Pookkal Panineer" (Action Hero Biju)
- Asianet Film Awards 2017 – Best Lyricist, Malayalam for "Pookkal Panineer" (Action Hero Biju)
- Filmfare Awards South 2018 – Nominee: Best Lyricist, Malayalam for "Akale Oru Kadinte" (Ramante Edenthottam)

Although he has not received the Kerala State Film Award, Varma stated in a 2014 interview with The Times of India that he had no regrets about it.
