= Pretham 2 =

2018 film by Ranjith Sankar

- Theatrical release poster
- Directed by: Ranjith Sankar
- Screenplay by: Ranjith Sankar
- Produced by: Ranjith Sankar; Jayasurya
- Starring: Jayasurya; Durga Krishna; Amith Chakalakkal; Sidhartha Siva
- Cinematography: Vishnu Narayanan
- Edited by: V. Saajan
- Music by: Anand Madhusoodanan
- Production companies: Dreams N Beyond; Punyalan Cinemas
- Distributed by: Fox Star Studios
- Release date: 21 December 2018 (India)
- Running time: 133 minutes
- Country: India
- Language: Malayalam

Pretham 2 (transl. Ghost 2) is a 2018 Indian Malayalam-language comedy horror drama film written, co-produced and directed by Ranjith Sankar. It is a sequel to the 2016 film Pretham. Jayasurya returns for the lead role, alongside a new supporting cast including Amith Chakalakkal, Durga Krishna, Sidhartha Siva, Saniya Iyappan and Dain Davis. Jayasurya co-produced the film with Sankar and also distributed it together. Pretham 2 was released on 21 December 2018.

== Plot ==
Five members of a Facebook group of cinema enthusiasts decide to meet each other in real-life and to shoot a short film directed by one of the members, Tapas Menon. They lodge in Mangalassery Mana, an old mansion known to feature in many films which has been a tourist destination for the same reason. The team experiences paranormal activity during their stay. Meanwhile, mentalist John Don Bosco, their neighbour who has come for the Kayakalpa treatment, takes an interest in the paranormal phenomena.

It is eventually revealed that the spirit causing the problems is of a young man named Manav Matthew. John finds out that Manav was an introvert and was also part of the same Facebook group, under the pseudonym "May Flower". After meeting Manav's mother, it is revealed that Manav was cheated in a credit card fraud by an unknown member of the group. As a result, his father Matthew Emmanuel, the bank manager, was arrested who testified in court taking the blame for what he believed was Manav's crime in order to save his son's future. Filled with remorse, Manav commits suicide.

John discovers that Manav had been suspecting the five, hence the paranormal activities to find out who. John takes an interest in finding out the culprit. Manav's ghost gives clues on the investigation and it is revealed to John that the culprit uses the Facebook username "JOKER". John creates a Facebook account with the username Sherlock and successfully communicates with JOKER by tricking him into offering hacking lessons to avail free internet. John is assisted by his friend in Police cyber cell, Meera Anwar. John and JOKER decide to meet at the screening of the short film, where almost all the members of the group would arrive.

The short film screened is a detailing of the incidents that happened at the Mangalassery Mana including Manav's story. However, the film ends without a climax. Meera intervenes by unveiling the investigation and has her force lockdown the hall. John begins by explaining to the audience that the story of the short film was indeed real and the culprit was in the hall with them. John then shortlists the audience through various mentalism tricks into a five-member group. John is confused as he gets the same reactions from all five that was anticipated from JOKER. He eventually finds out all five of them is the "JOKER" as the word is taken from the initial of their first name (Jyothish, Ouseppachan, Kalidas, Emil & Renil).

They are arrested and apparently Manav's ghost is seen to be accompanying them. A few days later, John is reads in a newspaper that the five were found dead under mysterious circumstances in prison the day after Manav's father was released from prison. In the end, Priyalal, Denny, and Shibu from the last film come to Mangalassery Mana and are surprised to see John there, who is about to leave.

== Cast ==
- Jayasurya as John Don Bosco, a mentalist
- Durga Krishna as Anu Thankam Paulouse
- Sidhartha Siva as Ramanath Kalathingal
- Amith Chakalakkal as Tapas Menon
- Saniya Iyappan as Niranjana Venu/Neeru
- Dain Davis as Joffin
- Raghavan as Venu Vaidyar
- Minon as Manav Mathew / May Flower
- Muthumani as Commissioner Meera Anwar IPS
- Jayaraj Warrier as Unni Warrier
- Manikandan Pattambi as Mani Uncle
- Sathi Premji as Mary
- Parvathi T. as Deepa Mathew, Manav's mother
- Madhupal as Mathew Emmanuel, Manav's father
- Sreejith Ravi as SI
- Aju Varghese as Denny Kokkan (Cameo appearance)
- Govind Padmasoorya as Shibu Majeed (Cameo appearance)
- Sharaf U Dheen as Priyalal (Cameo appearance)
- Sharath SathyaKumar as kalidas (Joker gang)
- Rinil (Rejoy) (Joker)
- Santhosh Kumar Kana
- Sudheesh Bharathan as Jyothish (Joker gang)

== Production ==
After the 2018 film Njan Marykutty, Jayasurya and Ranjith Sankar joined again, for making a sequel to their 2016 comedy horror film Pretham. Pretham 2 marks their sixth collaboration and third consecutive collaboration.

== Release ==
The film had its theatrical release on 21 December 2018. It was released in the United Arab Emirates on 27 December 2018.

=== Critical response ===
The Times of India rated the film 3.5 out of 5 stars. The New Indian Express rated it 3 out of 5 stars and said, "Jayasurya and a few cool ideas make this a watchable flick". Sify gave the movie 3.5 out of 5 stars and described it as "a rehash of the earlier formula".
