= Jackson Bazaar Youth =

- Theatrical release poster
- Directed by: Shamal Sulaiman
- Written by: Usman Marath
- Produced by: Zakariya Mohammed
- Starring: Lukman Avaran; Jaffar Idukki; Indrans
- Cinematography: Kannan Patteri
- Edited by: Appu N. Bhattathiri; Shaijas K. M.
- Music by: Govind Vasantha
- Production companies: Cross Boarder Camera; Imagine Cinema.
- Distributed by: Central Pictures
- Release date: 19 May 2023
- Country: India
- Language: Malayalam

Jackson Bazaar Youth is a 2023 Indian Malayalam-language film directed by Shamal Sulaiman and produced by Zakariya Mohammed under the banner of Cross Boarder Camera and Imagine Cinema. The film stars Lukman Avaran, Jaffar Idukki, Indrans, Chinnu Chandni and Fahim Safar. The film's music is composed by Govind Vasantha.

== Premise ==
The story of the film revolves around a band of friends who live in Jackson market. These friends chasing their dream unknowingly get caught in a web of crime and violence. They start receiving threats to destroy their friendship, their band and their lives over a land dispute. In the film, we will get to see how these small but familiar difficulties are faced.

== Cast ==
- Lukman Avaran as Appu
- Jaffar Idukki as Jackson Velayyan
- Indrans as CI Sadashivam
- Chinnu Chandni as Probation SI Shafna
- Fahim Safar as Rameshan
- Gopalan Adatt as Shankaran
- Anagha Ashok as Rekha
- Shankar Raj as Uthaman
- Binu Pappu as SP George Simon
- Abhiram Radhakrishnan as SI Aravindan
- Binu Thomman as CI/SHO Rajeevan
- Balan Parakkal as ASI Prathapan
- Sundar Pandian as ASI Ragunathan
- Shankar as SCPO Uthaman
- Najeeb as CPO Najeeb
- Vidhya Vijayakumar as Sheela
- Shamsu as Naseer
- Radhika as Tahasildar

== Production ==
The principal photography of the film started in August 2022 in Thenmala and Kollam. The first-look of the film was released by Mammootty. The production company announced that the film will be released on 19 May 2023.

== Release ==
=== Theatrical ===
The film was released in theatres on 19 May 2023

=== Home media ===
The film is digitally streaming on Saina Play and Amazon Prime Video. It is also available in Hindi & Marathi language dubbed versions, currently streaming on Ultra Play & Ultra Jhakaas app, respectively.

== Reception ==
S. R. Praveen of The Hindu wrote that "An unconvincing mish-mash of issues, without any punch". Vignesh Madhu of Cinema Express gave 2.5 stars out of 5 and noted that "the film falters big time by not sustaining the momentum". Princy Alexander of Onmanorama wrote that "Jackson Youth Bazaar is a good addition to films in Mollywood that are attempting to stand apart with its theme and treatment".
