= Chekavar (film) =

- Directed by: Sajeevan
- Written by: Sajeevan
- Produced by: Pentagon Creations
- Starring: Indrajith Sukumaran; Kalabhavan Mani; Samvrutha Sunil; Sreejith Ravi
- Cinematography: Sujith Vaassudev
- Edited by: Samjith Mohammed
- Music by: Rahul Raj
- Release date: 8 October 2010
- Country: India
- Language: Malayalam

Chekavar (transl. Warrior) is a 2010 Indian Malayalam-language action thriller film written and directed by Sajeevan. It stars Indrajith Sukumaran, Kalabhavan Mani, Samvrutha Sunil, Sarayu and Sreejith Ravi in the lead roles. Rahul Raj composed the film's music with lyrics written by Anil Panachooran. The film was released on 8 October 2010. Indrajith Sukumaran plays the role of a police officer while Kalabhavan Mani plays an underworld don. The story progresses as both of them fight each other for their siblings.

== Plot ==
SI Kasinathan, leads a happy life with his family in his hometown. His life takes a turn when he came across and meets a reformed underworld don and family man Raghavan after his punishment transfer to Kochi. He rescues his younger sister Gauri from Raghavan's younger brother Rocky, a dreaded and terrorising criminal who wants to marry Gowri, as an act of revenge for beating him and his friends as they were molesting the daughter of a constable in his station after he is released from jail. Raghavan approaches Kasinathan with a proposal to marry off Gowri to Rocky, which can reform Rocky in the same way as Raghavan, but Kasinathan objects strongly. But Raghavan is unaware of Rocky's true intentions with the marriage.

== Cast ==
- Indrajith Sukumaran as SI Kasinathan
- Kalabhavan Mani as Garudan Raghavan
- Sreejith Ravi as Udumbu Rocky (Voice dubbed by Shobi Thilakan)
- Jagathy Sreekumar as Bahuleyan
- Suraj Venjaramoodu as Gunashekaran
- Samvrutha Sunil as Jyothi
- Sarayu as Gauri
- Kalashala Babu as Shekarankutty
- Subair as DYSP Menon
- Janardhanan as P.M Vasudhevan
- Ajith Kollam as Musthafa
- Saju Kodiyan as Sundaran, Party Member
- T. P. Madhavan as Madhavan
- Lakshmi Priya as Indu

== Production ==
A customary pooja was held in February 2010, and the shooting began in Kerala at the end of February 2010.

== Soundtrack ==
Chekavar

Soundtrack album by Rahul Raj
- Released: 22 July 2010
- Genre: Soundtrack
- Label: Tune 4 Records

Rahul Raj chronology
Ritu (2009)	Chekavar (2010)	Oh My Friend (2011)

The original music and background score of the film are composed, arranged, programmed, and produced by Rahul Raj, and the lyrics are penned by Anil Panachooran. The audio rights were bought by a Bangalore-based music label, Tune4 Music, marking their entry into Malayalam Film Industry. The audio was launched on 19 August in a function held at The Wyte Fort Hotel, Cochin, in the presence of actor Prithviraj. The audio recorded excellent sales on the first day and has received generally positive reviews from both critics and Rahul Raj fans. The audio contains a total of thirteen tracks, out of which three are songs, and the rest are extracts from the background score of the film. This is the first time in the Malayalam industry, extracts from the score are being released as a motion picture soundtrack.

No.	Title	Performer(s)	Length
1.	"Poonchillayil"	Vijay Yesudas, K. S. Chithra
2.	"Poril Theyyaram"	Indrajith, Ragged Skull
3.	"24 Hours"	Rahul Raj
4.	"Gauri: The Village Girl"	Rahul Raj, Gayatri Suresh, Josy
5.	"Heart of God"	Rahul Raj, Chorus
6.	"In Search of Love"	Rahul Raj, Sangeetha Prabhu, Kamalakar, Josy
7.	"Metal Pooram"	Rahul Raj, Ragged Skull
8.	"The Final Invasion"	Rahul Raj, Chorus
9.	"Love"	Rahul Raj, Josy
10.	"Helpless"	Rahul Raj, Josy
11.	"Forces of the Dark"	Rahul Raj
12.	"Poonchillayil" (Karaoke)
13.	"Poril Theyyaram" (Karaoke)

== See also ==
- Chekavar
