= Punyalan Private Limited =

- Theatrical release poster
- Directed by: Ranjith Sankar
- Written by: Ranjith Sankar
- Produced by: Jayasurya; Ranjith Sankar
- Starring: Jayasurya; Vijayaraghavan; Aju Varghese; Sreejith Ravi; Dharmajan Bolgatty; Guinness Pakru
- Cinematography: Vishnu Narayanan
- Edited by: V. Saajan
- Music by: Anand Madhusoodanan
- Production company: Dreams N Beyond
- Distributed by: Punyalan Cinemas
- Release date: 17 November 2017
- Running time: 129 minutes
- Country: India
- Language: Malayalam

Punyalan Private Limited is a 2017 Indian Malayalam-language political satire film written, co-produced and directed by Ranjith Sankar. It is a sequel to the 2013 film Punyalan Agarbattis and stars Jayasurya, Aju Varghese, Vijayaraghavan, Sreejith Ravi, Dharmajan Bolgatty and Guinness Pakru. Produced by Jayasurya and Sankar, the film marks the debut of their distribution company Punyalan Cinemas. The film was a blockbuster hit collecting almost twice as the first part.

Filming began in August 2017. The film was released on 17 November 2017. A third part is in development.

== Plot ==
Joy Thakkolkkaran, after death of his wife Anu, lost his first incense stick company, Punyalan Agarbattis, to debt. However, he doesn't give up and decides to get back up. As a growing entrepreneur, he pursues a venture to sell elephant urine as a softdrink. His ideas are supported by his friends and workers Greenu Sharma, Abhaya Kumar, Peer Thanesh etc. As usually he doesn't give consideration to how the system works and clashes with the system. He is very adamant in his companies functioning. When things don't go his way, he forces himself to be the centre of media attention and adopts the situation to make his dreams come true. Joy gets an opportunity to shadow the Chief Minister Shakthan Rajashekharan through the media attention and he uses this to voice his opinions about and against the corrupt system and publicizes his product. When it comes to a point where Shakthan Rajashekaran is against Joy, he utilizes the media that is ready for a marketable news. Joy argues a politician is a service person and for them, people are consumers and consumers are the king. Finally, due to his efforts Shakthan Rajashekaran resigns. In the end, Joy opens his new factory inaugurated by his formal rival.

== Cast ==
- Jayasurya as Joy Thakkolkaran
- Vijayaraghavan as Chief Minister Shakthan Rajashekharan
- Aju Varghese as Greenu Sharma
- Nyla Usha as Anu [photo presence]
- Sreejith Ravi as Abhyakumar
- Dharmajan Bolgatty as Advocate Peer Thanish
- Guinness Pakru as A. K. Chandrakanth
- Sunil Sukhada as Magistrate
- Vinod Kovoor as Pappan
- Ponnamma Babu as Usha
- RJ Renu
- Arya Rohit as Golda, Media Reporter
- Jayaraj Warrier as Kaattaalan
- Vishnu Govindan as Gladson, Media Reporter
- Sathi Premji as Narayani
- Gokulan as Jimbruttan
- Vimalkumar as Sajan
- Surjith Gopinath as Lottery seller

== Production ==
After the 2016 film Pretham, Ranjith Sankar decided to collaborate again with Jayasurya. Sankar got the initial idea of a film while he was travelling on train to Thiruvananthapuram, it was announced to be a sequel to their 2013 film Punyalan Agarbattis. Sankar was pondering over the idea of making a sequel to the film since 2013, "I must have thought about over 10,000 stories for the sequel. Political satire need to have a strong subject. Then, the common trend where sequels rarely turn better than first part too was a hindrance. But, when I landed this story, I realised it is time to announce the project," says Sankar, who scripted it himself. Sankar and Jayasurya launched the distribution company Punyalan Cinemas with this film. Sankar said, "the idea behind Punyalan Cinemas is to release our films and others films which we believe in. A humble step into the big ocean of cinema again".

The film started filming on 1 August 2017.

== Soundtrack ==
Punyalan Private Limited

Soundtrack album to Punyalan Private Limited by Anand Madhusoodanan
- Released: 2017
- Recorded: 2017
- Genre: Feature film soundtrack
- Length: 25:43
- Language: Malayalam
- Producer: Anand Madhusoodanan

Anand Madhusoodanan chronology
Vishwa Vikhyatharaya Payyanmar (2017)	Punyalan Private Limited (2017)

Anand Madhusoodanan and Bijibal composed the songs. Besides, Madhusoodanan also composed the background score. The lyrics were written by Santhosh Varma.

Track	Title	Singer(s)	Music
1	"Poorangalude Pooram"	P. Jayachandran	Bijibal
2	"Naalu Kombulla Kunjaana"	Vineeth Sreenivasan	Anand Madhusoodanan

== Release ==
The film was released in India on 17 November 2017.
