= Anand Madhusoodanan =

Indian Actor, Screen writer, film score composer, lyricist (born 1988)

- Born: Anand Madhusoodanan; May 30, 1988; Irinjalakuda, Kerala, India
- Occupations: Composer, Screenwriter, Lyricist & Actor
- Years active: 2012–present

Anand Madhusoodanan is an Indian Actor, Screenwriter, film score composer and lyricist who predominantly works in Malayalam cinema. After resigning his job as an audio engineer Anand started composing music for television commercials. In 2012 he did his debut film Molly Aunty Rocks! directed by Ranjith Sankar as composer. Later in 2021 Anand wrote his first screenplay for Krishnankutty Panithudangi directed by Sooraj Tom. Sooraj Tom then introduced Anand as an actor through his film Vishesham released in 2024 in which Anand has handled story, screenplay, dialogues, music and lyrics.

== Filmography ==
Key
†	Denotes films that have not yet been released

Year	Title	BGM	Songs	Lyrics	Writer	Actor	Notes
2012	Molly Aunty Rocks!	Yes	Yes	No	No	No	
2013	Weeping Boy	Yes	Yes	Yes	No	No	
2014	Mathai Kuzhappakkaranalla	No	Yes	No	No	No	
2015	Malettam	Yes	Yes	Yes	No	No	
2016	Varna Vasanthangal	Yes	Yes	No	No	No	
2016	Pa Va	Yes	Yes	No	No	No	
2016	Pretham	Yes	Yes	No	No	No	
2017	Gemini	Yes	No	No	No	No	
2017	Viswa Vikhyatharaya Payyanmar	Yes	No	No	No	No	
2017	Punyalan Private Limited	Yes	Yes	No	No	No	
2018	Njan Marykutty	Yes	Yes	No	No	No	
2018	Pretham 2	Yes	Yes	Yes	No	No	
2019	Oronnonnara Pranayakadha	Yes	Yes	No	No	No	
2019	Kamala	Yes	Yes	Yes	No	No	
2021	Krishnankutty Pani Thudangi	Yes	Yes	Yes	Yes	No	
2022	Madappally United	Yes	Yes	Yes	No	No	
2022	Two Men	Yes	Yes	No	No	No	
2024	Iyer In Arabia	Yes	Yes	No	No	No	
2024	Vishesham	Yes	Yes	Yes	Yes	Yes	
2025	Aap Kaise Ho	Yes	No	No	No	No	
