= Asha Aravind =

Indian model and actress

- Born: Asha Treesa Jose; May 8, 1982 (age 44)
- Occupation: Actress
- Years active: 2007–present

Asha Aravind is an Indian actress who prominently works in Malayalam films.

== Acting career ==
She made her film debut in 2012 with the movie Arike.

== Filmography ==
Year	Title	Role	Notes	Ref.
2012	Arike	Vinayan’s wife	Debut film	
2012	Friday	Chitra		
2013	Annayum Rasoolum	Rosy		
2013	Miss Lekha Tharoor Kaanunnathu	Lekha’s sister		
2013	Lokpal	Dr. Elizabeth	credited as Asha Jose	
2014	Vegam	Nancy		
2015	Swargathekkal Sundaram	Jalaja		
2015	Kumbasaram	School Teacher		
2016	Kattappanayile Rithwik Roshan	Jessy		
2017	Basheerinte Premalekhanam	Saramma		
2017	Pullikkaran Staraa	Sophy Stephen		
2018	Kalyanam	Rukmini		
2018	Mohanlal	Dr. Parvathy		
2019	Sakalakalashala	Mymuna		
2019	Mera Naam Shaji	Jancy Dominic		
2019	My Great Grandfather	Pooja		
2021	Ice Orathi	Asha		
2021	Home	Joseph’s wife		
2021	Kolaambi	Anju Sudharshan		
2022	Lalitham Sundaram	Priya		
2022	Heaven	Lalitha		
2023	Santhosham	Sindhu Suresh		
2023	Phoenix	Sister Aneetta		
2024	Raastha	Ayisha		
2025	Pralayashesham Oru Jalakanyaka	Plamena		
