= Ranjith Sankar =

Indian film director

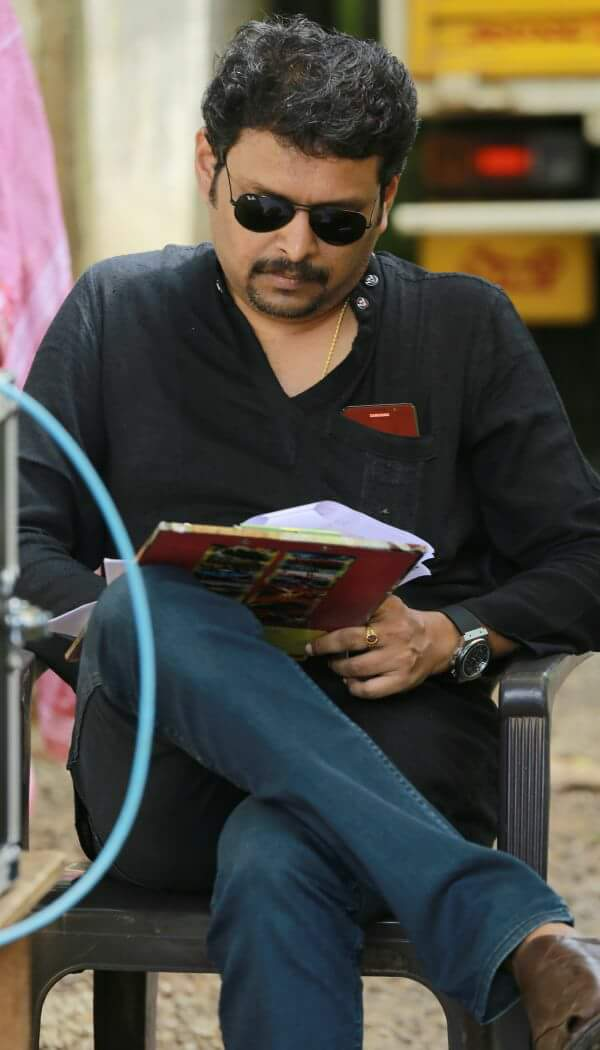
- Born: 14 February; Thrissur, Kerala, India
- Occupation: Filmmaker
- Years active: 2009–present
- Notable work: Passenger (2009); Pretham (2016)

Ranjith Sankar is an Indian filmmaker who works in Malayalam films. He started his movie career with the 2009 thriller Passenger. He launched his production house Dreams N Beyond in 2012 and his distribution house Punyalan Cinemas in 2017.

== Early life ==
Ranjith was born in Thrissur, Kerala, India. He completed his education at St. Thomas College in Thrissur and studied B.Tech. Civil Engineering at Mar Athanasius College of Engineering, Kothamangalam. Ranjith's writing career began with television series Nizhalkal and American Dreams. He won the Kerala State Award for Best Screenplay (Television) for American Dreams.

== Career ==
In 2009, he made Passenger. In 2011, his film Arjunan Saakshi, starring Prithviraj, was released. The film was inspired by his real-life experiences. It got positive reviews from the critics, but was a disappointment at the box office.

Molly Aunty Rocks (2012) starring Revathy and Prithviraj was Dreams n Beyond's first production, a critical and commercial success. It was followed by Punyalan Agarbattis (2013), a satire featuring Jayasurya, Nyla Usha, Innocent, Rachana Narayanankutty and Aju Varghese.

In November 2014, Ranjith's Varsham starring Mammootty, Asha Sarath and Mamta Mohandas was released. Mammootty won several awards for his role in the film. This was followed by Su Su Sudhi Vathmeekam, in November 2015.

The horror-comedy film Pretham was released in August 2016. It was partially remade in Telugu as Raju Gari Gadhi 2 (2017) starring Nagarjuna Akkineni.

Ranjith also produced Ramante Edanthottam(2017), a best-selling movie on female empowerment. He followed it up with sequels to Punyalan and Pretham titled Punyalan Private Limited and Pretham2. He launched his distribution company Punyalan Cinemas with Punyalan Private Limited, another major commercial success.

In 2018, Ranjith directed the film "Njan Marykutty," which is recognized as the first commercial movie in India to feature a transgender protagonist. The lead character of Marykutty was portrayed by actor Jayasurya, and the film went on to win two Kerala State Awards and received significant recognition at film festivals.

The experimental thriller Kamala was released in 2019.

In 2023, Ranjith highlighted the importance of prioritizing box office revenue over other income streams, particularly OTT platforms.

== Filmography ==
Key
†	Denotes films that have not yet been released

Year	Title	Cast	Notes
2009	Passenger	Dileep, Sreenivasan, Mamta Mohandas, Jagathy Sreekumar	
2011	Arjunan Sakshi	Prithviraj, Ann Augustine, Mukesh, Biju Menon	
2012	Molly Aunty Rocks	Prithviraj, Revathi, Lalu Alex	
2013	Punyalan Agarbattis	Jayasurya, Nyla Usha, Aju Varghese	
2014	Varsham	Mammootty, Asha Sharath	
2015	Su Su Sudhi Vathmeekam	Jayasurya, Sshivada, Aju Varghese	
2016	Pretham	Jayasurya, Aju Varghese, Sharaf U Dheen, Shruti Ramachandran	
2017	Ramante Edanthottam	Kunchacko Boban, Anu Sithara, Joju George, Jayasurya (cameo), Aju Varghese	
2017	Punyalan Private Limited	Jayasurya, Dharmajan Bolgatty, Aju Varghese	
2018	Njan Marykutty	Jayasurya, Jewel Mary, Aju Varghese	
2018	Pretham 2	Jayasurya, Saniya Iyappan, Amith Chakalakkal, Durga Krishna, Aju Varghese	
2019	Kamala	Aju Varghese, Anoop Menon, Ruhani Sharma, Biju Sopanam	
2021	Sunny	Jayasurya, Aju Varghese, Shritha Sivadas, Sshivada	Amazon Original
2022	4 Years	Priya Prakash Varrier, Sarjano Khalid	
2024	Jai Ganesh	Unni Mukundan, Mahima Nambiar	

== Awards ==
Kerala State Awards

- Best screenplay (Television) for the 2003 serial American Dreams

Dubai AMMA Awards

- Best Socially Committed movie Director - Passenger
- Best Debut director - Passenger

Asianet Film Awards

- Best screenplay - Passenger
- Popular film - Pretham

Kerala Film Critics Awards

- Special Jury Award for direction - Passenger

World Malayali Council - Kairali Awards

- Best Screenplay - Passenger

Surya TV Awards

Best Debut director

V Santharam Awards

Best Debut director (Nomination)

Filmfare Awards

Best Director (Nomination)

SouthScope Awards

Best Director (Nomination)

Other awards

2009: First Lohithadas Puraskaram for best screenplay
