= Gokulan =

Indian actor

- Born: Gokulan; Kerala, India
- Citizenship: Indian
- Occupation: Actor
- Years active: 2013–present
- Spouse: Dhanya

Gokulan is an Indian actor who appears in Malayalam films. He made his acting debut through the movie Punyalan Agarbattis by doing the character of Jimbroottan, which became popular. As of 2021, he has so far acted in more than 30 Malayalam movies.

== Career ==
Gokulan made his acting debut in 2013 with the film Punyalan Agarbattis. Even though he did a minor comedy role called Jimbrootan in the movie, which also had a less screen time, the character became very popular. Gokulan later did different minor roles in some movies. He also appeared in few character roles during this time. He went on to act in the films like Thoppil Joppan, Vaarikkuzhiyile Kolapathakam, Ente Ummante Peru, Punyalan Private Limited, Sapthamashree Thaskaraha, Pathemari, Ramante Edantottam and several others. But, it was the 2019 movie Unda (film) that gave him a new turn on his film career. Gokulan had a major character role in this movie. His performance in the 2020 movie Love was critically acclaimed. Gokulan then did the notable roles in the movies Innu Mudhal and Randu which was released in March and April 2021 respectively.

== Personal life ==
He married his long time girlfriend Dhanya in May 2020.

== Filmography ==
Year	Title	Role	Notes
2013	Amen	Coconut Tree Climber	Debut Film
2013	Punyalan Agarbattis	Jimbruttan	
2014	1983	Kuttan	
2014	Sapthamashree Thaskaraha	Locksmith	
2015	Onnam Loka Mahayudham		
2015	You Too Brutus	Urumis	
2015	Acha Dhin	Kamarajan	
2015	Pathemari	Narayanan's Relative	
2016	Shikhamani		
2016	Anuraga Karikkin Vellam		
2016	Inspector Dawood Ibrahim	Karthavu	
2016	Thoppil Joppan	Balram	
2016	Kolumittayi		
2017	Aby	Villager	
2017	Ramante Edanthottam	Praneepmon	
2017	Godha	Driver	
2017	Lavakusha	Shambu	
2017	Punyalan Private Limited	Jimbruttan	
2017	Paippin Chuvattile Pranayam	Villager	
2018	Mohanlal	Mujeeb	
2018	Marubhoomiyile Mazhathullikal		
2018	Iblis	Vareed	
2018	Mangalyam Thanthunanena	Kuttappayi	
2018	Chalakkudikkaran Changathi	Kunju Raman	
2018	Ente Ummante Peru	Villager	
2019	Vaarikkuzhiyile Kolapathakam	Bijukkuttan	
2019	Unda	PC Gokulan Balachandran	
2019	Vattamesha Sammelanam		
2019	Kamala	An activist	
2019	Puzhikkadakan	Manoj	
2020	L2R	Auto Driver	Short Film
2020	Love	Anoop's friend	
2021	Innu Muthal	Eldhoppi	
2022	Randu		
2022	Upacharapoorvam Gunda Jayan	Suni	
2022	Kochaal	Bindusaaran	
2022	Thallumaala	Rajan	also singer
2022	Saudi Vellakka	Adv. Gokulan	
2023	Aalankam		
2023	Ayalvaashi	Ajippan	
2023	Padmini	Rafi	
2023	Maharani		
2024	Oru Sarkar Ulpannam	Velichappadu	
2024	Thundu	CPO Naveen	
2024	Manorajyam		
2025	Pralayashesham Oru Jalakanyaka	Thief	
2026	Unmadham		
2026	Orijinal		
