= Vishesham =

Indian comedy drama film

- Theatrical Release Poster
- Directed by: Sooraj Tom
- Written by: Anand Madhusoodanan
- Produced by: Ani Sooraj
- Starring: Anand Madhusoodanan; Chinnu Chandni; Baiju Johnson; Althaf Salim
- Cinematography: Sagar Ayyappan
- Edited by: Malavika VN
- Music by: Anand Madhusoodanan
- Production company: Step2Films
- Distributed by: Step2Films Through Sree Priya Combines
- Release date: 19 July 2024
- Country: India
- Language: Malayalam

Vishesham is a 2024 Malayalam language comedy drama movie written by Anand Madhusoodanan and directed by Sooraj Tom. The film features Anand Madhusoodanan, Chinnu Chandni, Baiju Johnson and Althaf Salim in lead roles.

== Plot ==
The film is set in the densely crowded Cochin, a city filled with the advertisements of fertility clinics. Flavoured with humour, Vishesham conveys the story of today's world of fertility treatments.

== Cast ==
- Anand Madhusoodanan as Shiju Bhakthan
- Chinnu Chandni as CPO T R Sajitha
- Ezhupunna Baiju as Subhash Bhakthan
- Althaf Salim as Saji
- Johny Antony as Dr. Ganapathy S Adiga
- Dileesh Pothan as Ex. husband of Sajitha
- Vineeth Thattil David as SI Johny
- P.P. Kunhikrishnan as Rahulan nair
- Suraj Pops as Titto
- Sijo Johnson as Sijo Aliyan
- Gilu Joseph as Mini
- Mala Parvathi as Dr. Mary Joseph
- Shyni Sara as Sheela
- Bhanumathi Payyanur as Lathammayi
- Ajitha Nambiar as Vasanthy
- Amrutha Krishna Kumar as Sindhu
- Ann Saleem as Nurse Minimini
- Tomy Kumbidikkaran as CI Jaffer
- Keerthana Aalvi as Ex. Wife of Shiju
