= Jayaraj Warrier =

Indian actor

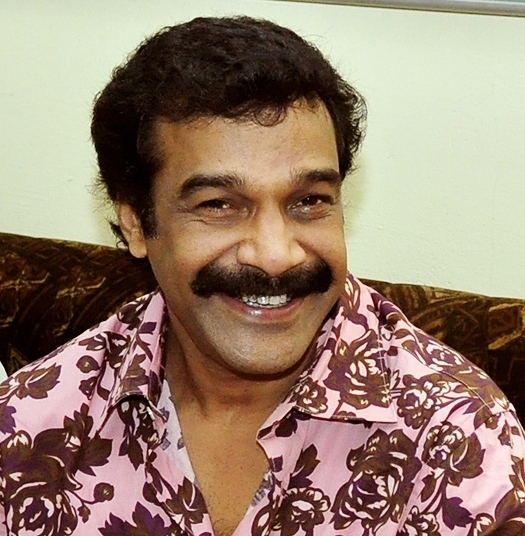
- Born: 1963 (age 62–63); Thrissur, Kerala, India
- Occupations: Actor; stand-up comedian; Ottamthullal performer
- Years active: 1984–present
- Children: Indulekha Warrier

Jayaraj Warrier is an Indian actor, stand-up comedian, Ottamthullal performer, and caricaturist. He appears in Malayalam films in supporting and comedic roles.

== Early life and career ==
Warrier hails from Thrissur, Kerala. He attended S.N. Boys High School, Kanimangalam, Thrissur. He then studied at Chinmaya Mission College, Thrissur, and St. Aloysius College, Thrissur.

Warrier began his career as an amateur theater artist in 1982 after studying Ottamthullal. He was part of the Root Theater Group led by Jose Chirammel for seven years from 1984. His daughter Indulekha Warrier is also a stage performer and playback singer. She made her debut as a music composer in Duniyavinte Orattathu. Head played noted roles in many stage performances such as Mudrarakshasam, Bhomaolpadanathinte Sooryavetta, Chathuppil Parkkunnavar and Shavaghoshayathra.

Warrier is also an eminent caricaturist and conducted many caricature shows inside and abroad the country. He performed a caricature show for the members in the Kerala Assembly in July 2003, which was the first time ever in the history of the Assembly. In 2010, he received the Kerala Sangeetha Nataka Akademi Award for his contributions to Drama and Caricature.

== Filmography ==
=== Films ===
| Year | Title | Role | Notes |
|---|---|---|---|
| 1997 | Oru Yathramozhi | | |
| 2000 | Kochu Kochu Santhoshangal | | |
| 2010 | Pranchiyettan and the Saint | Suresh Babu | |
| 2012 | Thiruvambadi Thamban | | |
| 2012 | Spirit | | |
| 2013 | Housefull | | |
| 2013 | Punyalan Agarbattis | Kaattalan Jose | |
| 2014 | Onnum Mindathe | | |
| 2014 | Apothecary | Varkkichan | |
| 2014 | Names Unknown | Truck driver | |
| 2014 | Mathai Kuzhappakkaranalla | Suneesh | |
| 2015 | Utopiayile Rajavu | Markkandeyan | |
| 2015 | Anarkali | Chettuva Shahjahan | |
| 2015 | Charlie | 'Vaattu' Jose | Cameo |
| 2016 | Kattumakkan | | |
| 2016 | Marubhoomiyile Aana | Porinchu | |
| 2017 | Georgettan's Pooram | Merlin's father | |
| 2017 | Varnyathil Aashanka | Pratheesh's uncle | |
| 2017 | Pullikkaran Staraa | Car passenger | |
| 2017 | Punyalan Private Limited | Thomas Kattalan | |
| 2018 | Aami | Sukumaran | |
| 2018 | Vikadakumaran | School teacher | |
| 2018 | Oru Pazhaya Bomb Kadha | Patient | |
| 2018 | Drama | M.R. Balachandran | |
| 2018 | Pretham 2 | Unni | |
| 2019 | The Gambler | | |
| 2019 | Porinju Mariam Jose | Tinto | |
| 2021 | One | Kuttikrishnan | |
| 2022 | Naaradan | Bhrahmav | |
| 2024 | Aaro | | |

=== Television ===
| Date | Show name | Role | Channel |
|---|---|---|---|
| 2015 | Comedy Festival 2 | Host | Mazhavil Manorama |
| 2020–present | Ruchiyathra | Host | Surya TV |
