= Shruti Ramachandran =

Indian actress

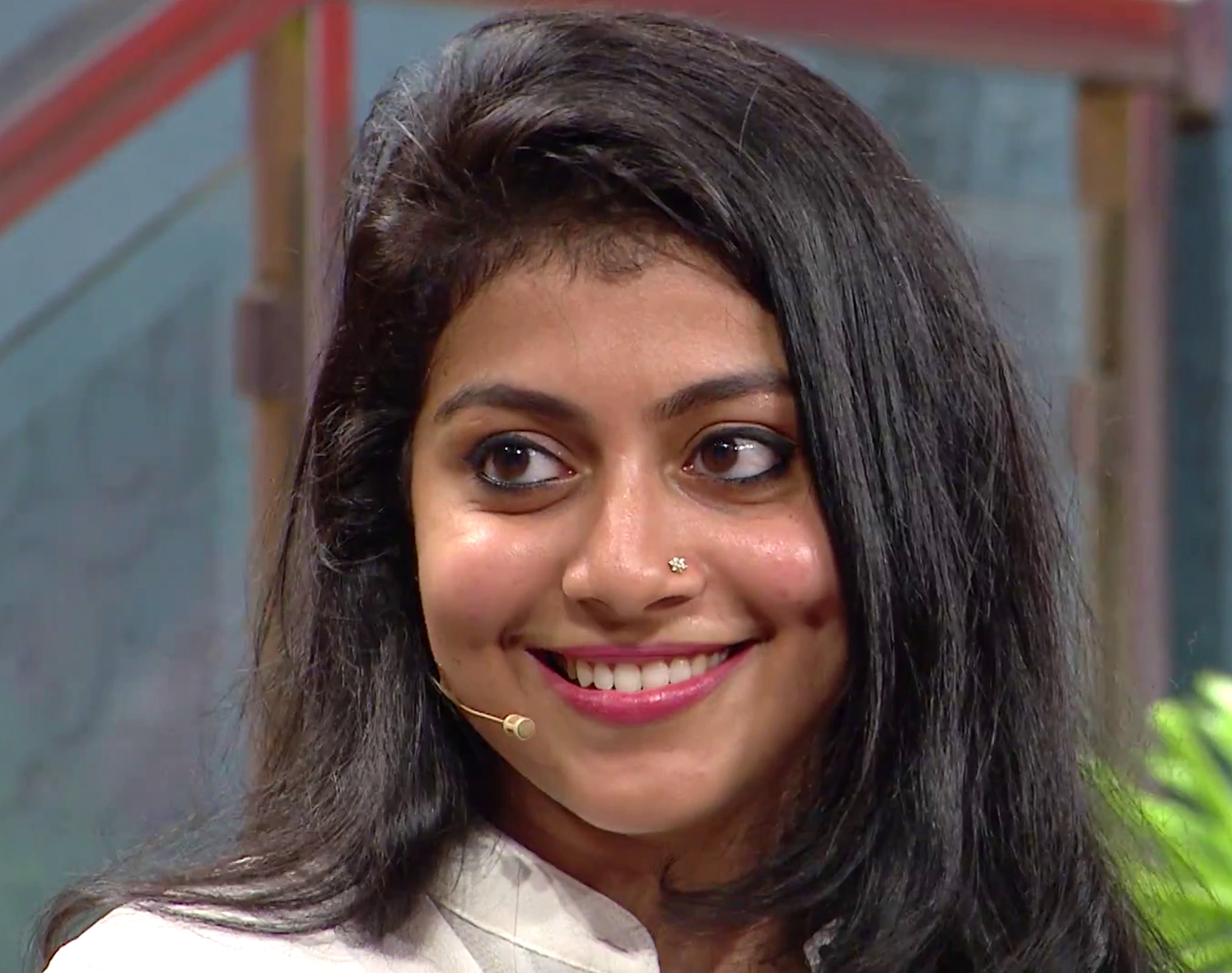
- Born: Chennai, Tamil Nadu, India
- Education: The Choice School
- Occupation: Actor
- Years active: 2014–present
- Spouse: Francis Thomas (m. 2016)

Shruti Ramachandran is an Indian actress who predominantly appears in Malayalam cinema. She co-wrote the "Ilamai Idho Idho" segment in the 2020 Tamil anthology film Putham Pudhu Kaalai. In 2020, she won the Kerala State Film Award for Best Dubbing Artist for her work in Kamala. In 2022, she won the Critics' mention for best actress by the Kerala Film Critics' Association for her work in Madhuram.

== Career ==
She is best known for her role in the 2021 film Madhuram with Joju George, 2016 film Pretham with Jayasurya, 2017 film Sunday Holiday with Asif Ali and 2021 film, Kaanekkaane with Tovino She also played a supporting role as Jaya in the 2019 Telugu movie Dear Comrade. She also starred in the movie Anveshanam, alongside Jayasurya in 2019.

Along with her husband Francis Thomas, Shruti wrote the segment "Ilamai Idho Idho" for the anthology film Putham Pudhu Kaalai which released in 2020.

Shruti won the ‘Special Jury mention for Acting excellence’ by the Kerala State Critics Association for her performance in Madhuram. Shruti also won the Kerala State Film Awards for the best Dubbing artist in 2020 for the movie Kamala, directed by Ranjith Sankar.

== Personal life ==
Shruti Ramchandran was born in Chennai, Tamil Nadu and later moved to Kochi, Kerala.

She did her montessori schooling at Lady Andal Venkatasubba Rao School, Chennai. She later went on to doing her primary to senior school education at The Choice School, Kochi.

Shruti is a trained architect who did her Bachelors in Architecture at The University School of Design, Mysore. Post her bachelors, she worked at architecture firms in Chennai and Bombay before doing her Masters in Self Sufficient Buildings from IAAC, Barcelona.

Shruti has also worked as a professor in Asian School of Architecture and Design Innovations (ASADI) in Kochi.

In 2016, she married her longtime boyfriend, Francis Thomas.

== Filmography ==
Year	Title	Role	Notes	Ref.
2014	Njaan	Susheela		
2016	Pretham	Clara		
2017	Sunday Holiday	Sithara		
2018	Chanakya Thanthram	Andrea		
2018	Nonsense	Sheena Miss		
2019	Dear Comrade	Jaya	Telugu film	
2020	Anveshanam	Kavitha		
2021	Kaanekkaane	Sherin		
2021	Madhuram	Chitra		
2023	Pachuvum Athbutha Vilakkum	Train passenger	Cameo appearance	
2023	Neeraja	Neeraja		
2024	Marivillin Gopurangal	Sherin		
2024	Grrr	Mridula		
2024	Nadanna Sambhavam	Roshi		
2025	JSK: Janaki V v/s State of Kerala	Adv. Niveditha Abel		
2025	Kalamkaval	Deepa		

=== Television ===
Year	Title	Role	Network	Language	Notes	Ref.
2018	Dollhouse Diaries	Mythili	MX Player	Tamil		
2018	Mimicry Mahamela	Mentor	Mazhavil Manorama	Malayalam		
2021	Putham Pudhu Kaalai		Amazon Prime Video	Tamil	Co-writer with Francis Thomas. Segment: Ilamai Idho Idho	
2022	Panam Tharum Padam	Contestant	Mazhavil Manorama	Malayalam		
2024	Miss Perfect		Disney+ Hotstar	Telugu	Co-writer with Francis Thomas	
2025	Pharma	Dr. Janaki	JioHotstar	Malayalam		
2026	Eyes	Vidhya	SonyLIV	Malayalam		
