= Ramante Edanthottam =

- Theatrical release poster
- Directed by: Ranjith Sankar
- Written by: Ranjith Sankar
- Produced by: Ranjith Sankar
- Starring: Kunchacko Boban; Anu Sithara; Joju George
- Cinematography: Madhu Neelakandan
- Edited by: V. Sajaan
- Music by: Bijibal
- Production company: Dreams N Beyond
- Distributed by: Central Pictures
- Release date: 12 May 2017
- Running time: 122 minutes
- Country: India
- Language: Malayalam

Ramante Edanthottam (transl. Raman's Garden of Eden) is a 2017 Indian Malayalam-language romantic drama film written, produced, and directed by Ranjith Sankar. The film stars Kunchacko Boban, Anu Sithara and Joju George in the lead roles. The filming began in February 2017 in Kochi and Vagamon. It was released in India on 12 May 2017.

== Plot ==
The movie starts with Malini taking a video message of herself to send to Raman while driving, telling him that she is coming this year to visit the Edanthottam. Unfortunately, she meets with an accident. At the hospital, her husband, Elvis, discovers from Malini's phone that she is having an affair with Raman. The film flashbacks to a year back, when Elvis, Malini, their 10-year-old daughter and their family friend, Salim, and family went to Edanthottam in Vagamon to cheer up Elvis (who is a desperate producer trying to make his comeback to the movie industry).

Malini is frequently insulted and looked down upon by Elvis who in contrast is a good father but a hideous husband. There, Malini meets the owner of the Edanthottam, Raman. She becomes friends with Raman, a widower(and his wife's name was also Malini). They spend time together talking about their life, past, and future, and gels up so much that at one point, they get an intuition of finding the perfect match for them. Even though Malini has a bad married life, she still respects the relationship she has with her husband and daughter and remains friends with Raman. On the other hand, Raman who was intensively in love with his late wife finds traces of her in Malini. He still keeps his relationship as a friend. They share their thoughts about each other's careers. Malini being a graceful dancer, Raman advises her to start a dance school and also invites her to come to his resort next year. Malini starts a dance school with Elvis's reluctant approval which becomes a success. As Elvis is a lazy, not-so-serious person who is not dedicated to his work, he accumulates huge debts which makes them change their home once in a while. Since Malini starts to earn from the dance school, she looks after the house, gets more confident, and voices her opinions in front of Elvis. Elvis is depicted as a cheating husband who goes to prostitutes while he is out of town for work.

Next year, Malini approaches Elvis about Raman's invitation. Elvis agrees, but a change in schedule makes him go to Chennai. Malini quietly goes to Ethanthottam alone where she and Raman fall on the verge of love. But it is shown that they respect their personalities and decide to remain good friends. In the present day, Malini recovers and is questioned by an angry Elvis. Malini leaves the house and sends Elvis a divorce notice which shows her being an independent woman. The movie ends with Malini driving a car to drop Raman at the airport. They continue their beautiful friendship and healthy relationship. It is also shown that the divorce is approved and their daughter is living with each parent separately each month.

== Cast ==
- Kunchacko Boban as Raman (Ram), Owner of the Edanthottam
- Anu Sithara as Malini, Elvis' wife (Voiceover by Sshivada)
- Shamma arshad as Malini's daughter
- Joju George as Elvis, Malini's husband
- Ramesh Pisharody as Varmaji
- Muthumani as Nasni, Malini's friend
- Sreejith Ravi as Salim
- Aju Varghese as Shathrughnan, Raman's younger brother
- Gokulan as Praneepmon
- Udaykrishna as fictional version of himself
- Jayasurya as himself

== Critical response ==
sify rated the film 3 out of 5 stars saying that "Ramante Edanthottam is a watchable entertainer". Filmibeat reviewed the film to be " An impressive take on romance and relationships. Watch it if you are a fan of light, feel-good cinema", while rated the film 3 out of 5 stars. Lensman rated the film 3 out of 5 stars saying that " Ramante Edanthottam has a progressive attitude which makes it an enjoyable cinema even when the film has the limitations of being dramatic and predictable. With humor, conflicts and sensible conversations this two-hour long movie is never a boring experience".

== Soundtrack ==
Music was composed by Bijibal, lyrics were written by Santhosh Varma.

1. "Akale Oru Kaadinte" - Shreya Ghoshal
2. "Kavitha Ezhuthunnu" - Sooraj Santhosh
3. "Maavilakudil" - Rajalakshmy Abhiram
