= Indulekha Warrier =

Indian singer, composer, rapper and actor

- Also known as: Indulekha Jayaraj
- Born: Indulekha J 15 July 1993 (age 32); Thrissur, Kerala, India
- Genres: Indian classical, Playback Singing, Rap
- Occupations: Playback singer, composer, actor
- Years active: 2011–present

Indulekha Warrier (born 15 July 1993) is an Indian playback singer, composer, rapper and an actor. She predominantly works in Malayalam cinema in addition to Tamil and Telugu films. Indulekha is trained in Carnatic classical music, Kathakali Sangeetham traditions and is also a recognised rap artist.

== Personal life ==
Indulekha Warrier was born in Thrissur to Jayaraj Warrier, a Standup Comic/Caricaturist, Actor in the Malayalam film Industry and Usha Jayaraj. Born into a family inclined to arts, Indulekha was introduced to the world of music as a child and started singing at an early age, initially accompanying her father on his tours. She is married to Anand Achuthankutty, a civilian officer with the Indian Defence Accounts Service. The couple have a son Sarang, who was born on 23 December 2021

== Career ==
Indulekha started her career making an acting debut in the movie Loudspeaker in 2009, in which she acted in a song in the movie. She returned as a playback singer in 2014, with the song Eeran Kannino Devaroopam, for the Malayalam movie Apothecary. She has since contributed to Malayalam cinema and Malayalam rap.

== Filmography ==
Year	Film	Director	Role
2009	Loudspeaker	Jayaraj	Soudamini

== Discography ==
Year	Title	Composer	Movie	Language
2014	Eeran Kannino Devaroopam	Sheikh Ellahi	Apothecary	Malayalam
2016	Pesu Pesu	Vidyasagar	Uchathula Shiva	Tamil
2018	Puthu Chemba	Sharreth	Autorsha	Malayalam
2020	Pattupettikara	Indulekha Warrier	Duniyavinde Orrattathu	Malayalam
2022	Freak Lookil	S. Chitra	Nalla Samayam	Malayalam
2023	Suryangam	Indulekha Warrier	Salaar: Part 1 – Ceasefire (D)	Malayalam
2023	Sathiyunarunnu	Kaithapram Viswanathan	Section 306 IPC	Malayalam
