= Pretham =

2016 film by Ranjith Sankar

- Theatrical release poster
- Directed by: Ranjith Sankar
- Written by: Ranjith Sankar
- Produced by: Ranjith Sankar; Jayasurya
- Starring: Jayasurya; Govind Padmasoorya; Sharaf U Dheen; Aju Varghese; Shruthi Ramachandran
- Cinematography: Jithu Damodar
- Edited by: V. Saajan
- Music by: Anand Madhusoodanan
- Production company: Dreams N Beyond
- Distributed by: Fox Star Studios; Central Pictures
- Release date: 12 August 2016 (India)
- Running time: 126 minutes
- Country: India
- Language: Malayalam
- Box office: est.₹12.45 crore

Pretham (transl. Ghost) is a 2016 Indian Malayalam comedy horror drama film, written, co-produced, and directed by Ranjith Sankar. The film stars Jayasurya, Govind Padmasoorya, Sharaf U Dheen, Aju Varghese, Shruthi Ramachandran, Pearle Maaney, Dharmajan Bolgatty and Hareesh Peradi in prominent roles. It is co-produced by Sankar and Jayasurya. The film was a commercial success and in 2018 a sequel, Pretham 2, was released.

It was remade in Telugu under the title Raju Gari Gadhi 2. This was the third collaboration of Sankar and Jayasurya after Punyalan Agarbattis and Su.. Su... Sudhi Vathmeekam. Principal photography began in Cherai, Ernakulam, on 24 May 2016. The film was released on 12 August 2016. A sequel titled Pretham 2 was released in 2018.

== Plot ==
Three young men - Denny Kokken, Shibu Majeed and Priyalal - have been friends since college. Together, they work till they hit their 30s and start their own business so that they can enjoy life in a semi-retired manner. They invest all their money in a resort in Kerala. However, their happy beginning is thwarted by paranormal activities, and they approach John Don Bosco, an exorcist, who works as a mentalist on cruise ships and in the entertainment industry. John also assists the police as a human lie detector with his cold reading techniques.

John informs the three hoteliers that their resort is haunted by a ghost who is seeking the identity and motives of her killers, and wants to know what they gained from her death. Through his investigation, John reveals that the ghost is Clara, a bright and intelligent student from National Law College. Amrita, the college principal's daughter was jealous of Clara's popularity and the fondness of her father towards Clara. Amrita secretly filmed Clara while bathing in the same resort owned by the three hoteliers and leaked it online. Unable to bear the shame, Clara committed suicide, by jumping off the building. John brings justice to Clara by answering her questions. He asks Amrita to see Clara by touching his hand. She falls down in shock, cringing away from the ghost glaring at her. This proves her guilt and she is arrested for the crime.

== Cast ==
- Jayasurya as John Don Bosco, an exorcist and mentalist
- Govind Padmasoorya as Shibu Majeed
- Sharaf U Dheen as Priyalal
- Aju Varghese as Denny Kokken
- Shruthi Ramachandran as Clara
- Sharanya Menon as Amritha
- Nyla Usha as Maya Thomas
- Pearle Maaney as Suhaanisa
- Dharmajan Bolgatty as Yeshu
- Sunil Sukhada
- Sathi Premji as Mary (Dakini)
- Hareesh Peradi as Priest
- Devan as Principal of National Law College and Amritha's father
- Vijay Babu as Commissioner Akash Kurien IPS
- Arya Rohit as Shalini
- Biyon as Tony
- Sini Abraham as Lecturer of National Law College

== Production ==
In 2000, Ranjith Sankar wrote the script for the TV serial, Nizhalukal, "probably the first horror serial" to premiere on Malayalam television. Citing it as an inspiration for the film, he said, "(I) have thought of umpteen subjects to explore the genre in movies all these years before arriving on this. Pretham is a horror comedy," on his Facebook profile.

Jayasurya played a Mentalist named John Don Bosco alongside Shruthi Ramachandran and Pearle Maaney. Initially, Mamta Mohandas was considered for the lead role but didn't materialize. Justin Jose, known for his work in the Telugu film Baahubali: The Beginning and the Bollywood film Bajrangi Bhaijaan, did the sound design. The filming began on 24 May 2016 in the small town of Cherai in Ernakulam.

== Music ==
Music: Anand Madhusoodanan
Lyrics: Rafeeq Ahamed.

=== Single ===
- Oruthikku Pinnil - Vineeth Sreenivasan

== Release ==
Pretham was released on 12 August 2016.

== Box office ==
The film had over 40% hike in collection from day 1 to day 2 at the Indian box office. It grossed ₹6.7 crore in three days. It remained in more than 185 screens in Kerala in its third week. The film grossed ₹18 crore in 23 days at the Indian box office. The film collected $4,650 from UK box office. The film collected ₹25 lakhs from USA box office in its third weekend. It was a commercial success.

== Sequel ==
The sequel to the film was titled Pretham 2 and was released on 21 December 2018 during the Christmas season.
