= Chinnu Chandni =

Indian actress

- Born: 1993 (age 32–33); Thiruvanthapuram
- Occupation: Actress
- Years active: 2016
- Notable work: Thamaasha, Vishesham, Bheemante Vazhi

Chinnu Chandni is an Indian actress who works in the Malayalam film industry. In 2019, she made her debut as a heroine in the movie Thamaasha.

== Career ==
Chinnu Chandni made her acting debut with the 2016 film Anuraga Karikkin Vellam directed by Khalid Rahman. Then in 2017, she played a small role in the film Cappuccino. Chinnu made her debut as a female lead in the Vinay Forrt-starrer Thamaasha and also played a notable role in the 2021 film Bheemante Vazhi both films are directed by Ashraf Hamza.

She then acted in Jackson Bazaar Youth, as part of an ensemble cast involving Jaffar Idukki, Indrans and Lukman Avaran. Chinnu was part of the Mammootty-starrer Kaathal – The Core where she played the respondent lawyer Adv. Sajitha. Her portrayal of the character received praise.

Chinnu had three releases in 2024 Golam, Vishesham and Thaanara. Golam was a police procedural thriller film and released to critical and commercial success. She played the role of Meera, an employee of the company where the investigation is underway, in the film.

Her second release of the year, Vishesham, was a commercial and critical success. The movie which depicted the trials and tribulations of a young couple and their journey towards parenthood was instantly loved by viewers upon its digital release. The onscreen chemistry between the couple has also been praised by those who have watched the film. Chinnu was lauded universally by critics and moviegoers alike, for her realistic and gritty performance as police character T R Sajitha. She went on to win awards for her performance in the film.

Thaanara, her third film of the year, saw her portray the role of Anjali, a socialite and wife to Shine Tom Chacko's MLA Adarsh Sreevaraham. The movie was a comedy drama film also featuring an ensemble cast of Aju Varghese, Vishnu Unnikrishnan, Deepti Sati and Sneha Babu. The film was her first foray into comedy and was directed by Haridas and scripted by Raffi.

== Personal life ==
Chinnu was born in Thiruvananthapuram and raised in Tanzania where her father worked. She later returned to India during her high school. She has also done an MPhil in Theater Arts. She now lives in Mumbai.

== Filmography ==
| Year | Title | Role | Notes |
|---|---|---|---|
| 2016 | Anuraga Karikkin Vellam | Jaslin | Debut film |
| 2017 | Cappuccino | | |
| 2019 | Thamaasha | Chinnu | |
| 2021 | Bheemante Vazhi | Anju Chandran | |
| 2021 | Njan Shakespeare | | |
| 2023 | Jackson Bazaar Youth | Probation SI Safna | |
| 2023 | Kaathal – The Core | Adv. Sajitha | |
| 2024 | Golam | Meera | |
| 2024 | Vishesham | CPO T R Sajitha | |
| 2024 | Thaanara | Anjali | |
| TBA | Vandd † | | |
