= Vishwa Vikhyatharaya Payyanmar =

Vishwa Vikhyaatharaya Payyanmar
- Theatrical release poster
- Directed by: Rajesh Kannankara
- Screenplay by: Rajesh Kannankara
- Story by: V. Dileep
- Produced by: Rejimon Kappaparambil
- Starring: Deepak Parambol; Aju Varghese; Sudhi Koppa; Leema Babu
- Cinematography: Prasanth Krishna
- Edited by: V. Sajan
- Music by: Anand Madhusoodanan
- Production company: Kirthana Movies
- Distributed by: Eros International
- Release date: 27 October 2017
- Country: India
- Language: Malayalam

Vishwa Vikhyatharaya Payyanmar is a 2017 Indian Malayalam-language film written and directed by Rajesh Kannankara, starring Deepak Parambol, Aju Varghese, and Sudhi Koppa. It was released worldwide on 27 October 2017 by Eros International.

== Plot ==
The friendship of five fun-loving youngsters and spreads the message that "the goodness in your heart never goes unrewarded".

== Cast ==
- Deepak Parambol as GopyKrishnan
- Aju Varghese as Jithin lal/lal
- Sudhi Koppa as Nirshad/Paintu Bichu
- Devan as Fa.Baby John
- Leema Babu as Tharuni/Tharu
- Hareesh Perumanna as P.P Shibu
- Bhagath Manuel as Saam
- Manoj K. Jayan as Sunny
- Rajesh Kannankara as Maneesh
- Kozhikode Narayan Nair as Gopalan
- Sasi Kalinga as Rajappan
- Balachandran Chullikkadu as Govindan Master
- Sunil Sugatha as Cameo Appearance
- G. K. Pillai as Cameo Appearance
- Preetha Pradeep as Cameo Appearance
- Daya Ashwathy

== Release ==
The film was released worldwide on 27 October 2017 by Eros International.
