= Sarath Kottikkal =

Indian documentary filmmaker

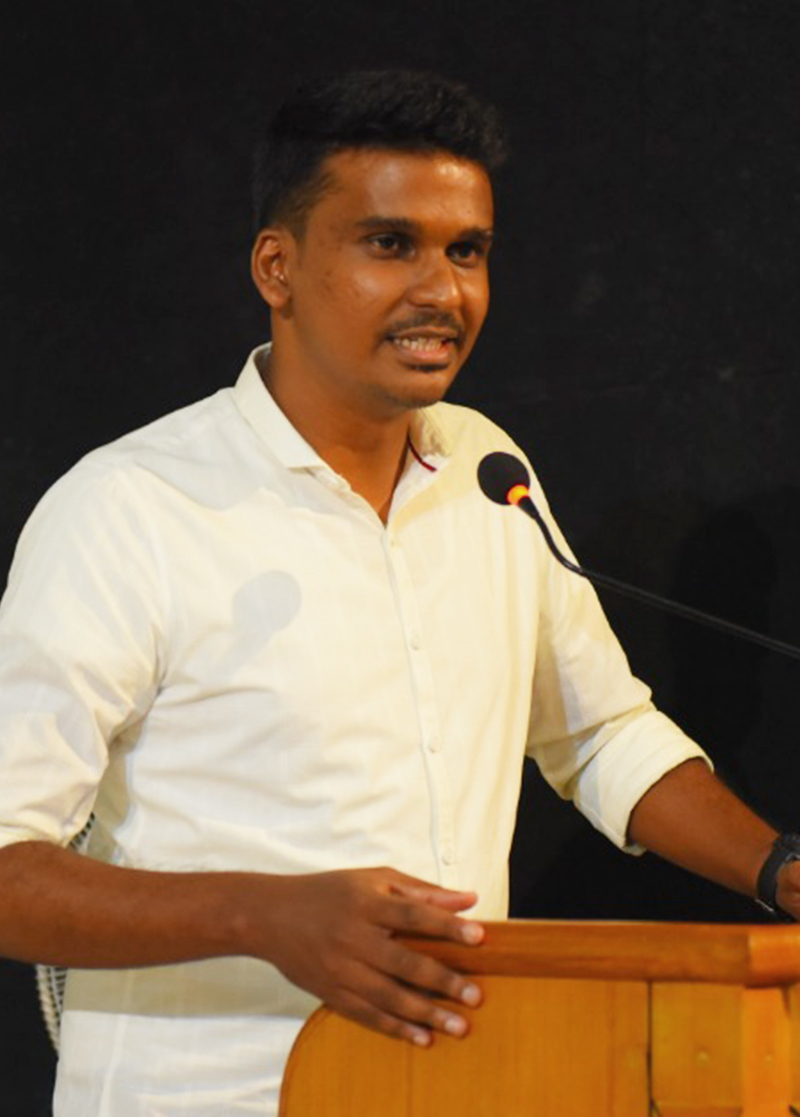
- Kottikkal speaking at Loyola College, Chennai
- Born: Thrissur, Kerala, India
- Occupation: Filmmaker
- Years active: 2011 - Present

Sarath Kottikkal is an Indian Filmmaker from Kerala, best known for the Documentary film Sarah Thaha Thoufeek (2022).

== Early life and education ==
Born in Thrissur, Sarath did graduation in Visual Communication and Masters in Journalism & Mass Communication. He has also completed a diploma in 3D Animation from Toonz Animation India, Academy. Sarath has done commercials for clients like Confident Group, Amrut Veni, Sangeetha Mobiles, and Gokulam Kerala FC through his production house OFT Studios Private Limited.

== Career ==
He started his career with Synagogueinte Naatil, a documentary about the Cochin Jews in Mattancherry, Kerala as a part of his academic project. In 2013, Sarath began the shoot of Sarah Thaha Thoufeek in Chendamangalam and continued till 2019. The makers hosted a special screening of Sarah Thaha Thoufeek as a homage to the late Sarah Jacob Cohen, the protagonist of the documentary, in Israel on 1 March 2020. The event was organised by Embassy of India in Israel & the Museum of the Jewish People at Beit Hatfutsot.

== Filmography ==
Year	Title	Category	Language	Credits			Notes
Year	Title	Category	Language	Director	Producer	Writer	Notes
2011	Synagogueinte Naatil	Documentary	Malayalam	Yes			
2022	Sarah Thaha Thoufeek	Documentary	English; Malayalam	Yes	Yes	Yes	
2022	Withdrawn	Short film			Yes		Directed by Nadiya Marwah
