= Sreejith Ravi =

Indian actor (born 1976)

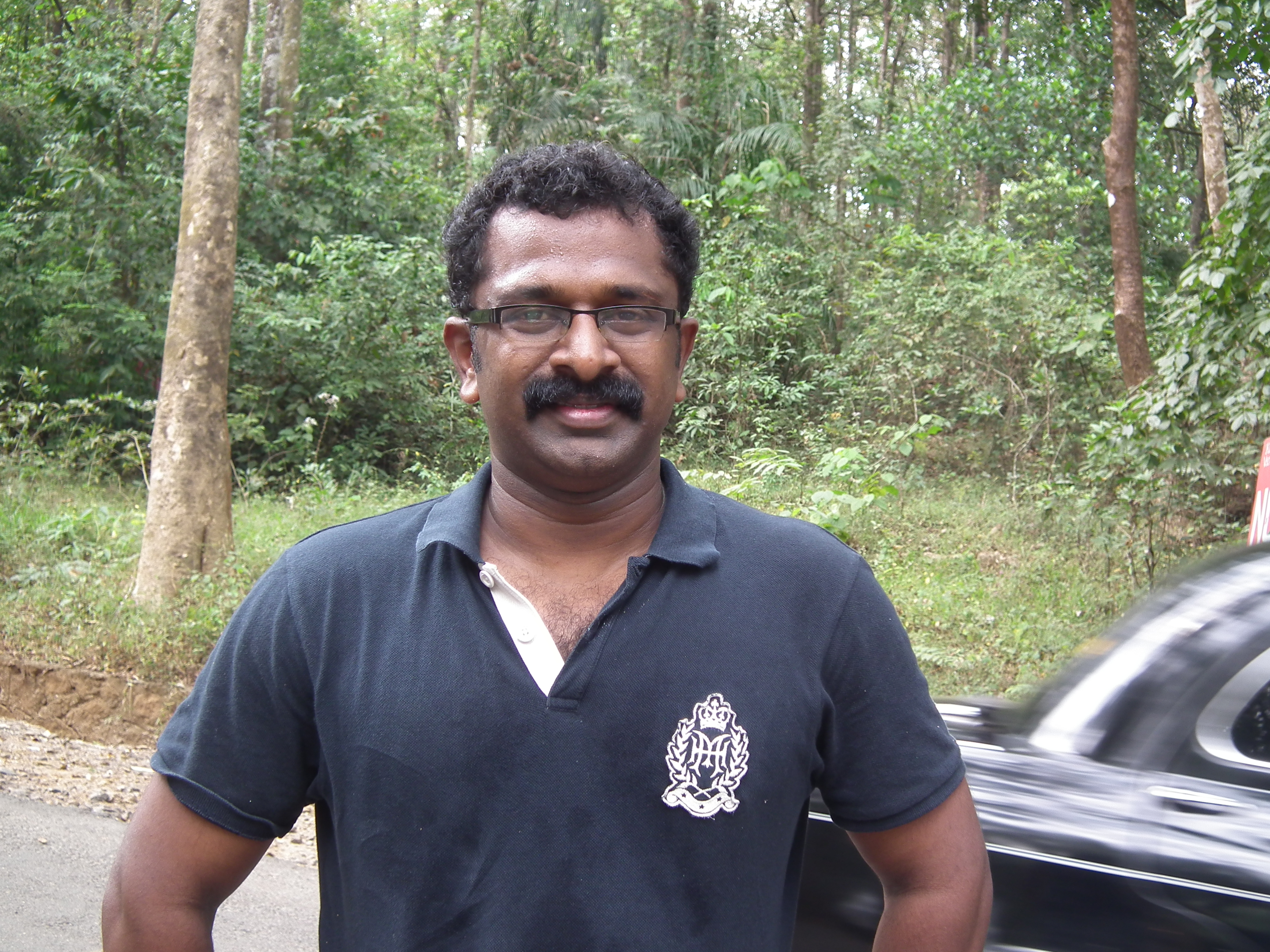
- Sreejith in 2011
- Born: 19 May 1976 (age 50); Thrissur district, Kerala, India
- Education: NITK; IBS Bengaluru; IBS Hyderabad
- Occupation: Actor
- Years active: 2005 – present
- Spouse: Sajitha Sreejith
- Children: 2
- Father: T. G. Ravi

Sreejith Ravi (born 19 May 1976) is an Indian actor who appears predominantly in Malayalam films and also in Tamil films. He is the son of actor T. G. Ravi.

== Early life ==
Sreejith is the son of actor and industrialist T. G. Ravi and V. K. Subhadra. He studied in Hari Sri Vidya Nidhi School, Thrissur. He received his Bachelor of Engineering in Mechanical Engineering from the National Institute of Technology Karnataka. He also received his PGDBA from ICFAI Business School, Bangalore, and Diploma in Business Finance from ICFAI Hyderabad.

== Career ==
He started his acting career in 2005 with the film Mayookham. He got a breakthrough after appearing in Chanthupottu. He also acted in Adoor Gopalakrishnan's Naalu Pennungal. He portrayed Sivarasan in the Rajiv Gandhi assassination-based Mission 90 Days. He had a substantial role in Chekavar. He debuted in Tamil film industry with Vettai. His roles in Sathyan Anthikad's Kadha Thudarunnu and Orkut Oru Ormakoot was different from the villains role he did until then.

He won SIIMA award in 2013 for the Best Comedian for his performance in Punyalan Agarbattis, in which he played a humorous role named Abhayakumar, an auto-rickshaw driver. He played main villain characters in the Tamil films Kumki, Madha Yaanai Koottam, Kathakali. He has acted in a Kannada film Happily Married. He also has dubbed for his father T. G. Ravi in Ashwaroodan and Pranchiyettan & the Saint.

== Personal life ==
Sreejith is married to Sajitha Sreejith and has two sons—Rijrashwa Sreejith and Ritunjay Sreejith.

== Filmography ==
Key
†	Denotes films that have not yet been released

=== Malayalam films ===
Year	Title	Role	Notes
2005	Mayookham	Damu	
2005	By the People	Sathyan	
2005	Chanthupottu	Clitus	
2005	Ravanan	Madhavan	
2005	Sketch	Bashir	
2005	Kerala Police		
2005	Naalu Pennungal	Pappukkutty	
2006	Lion	Kalloor Ravidas	
2006	The Don	Idikkatta Vasu	
2006	Jayam	Dennis	
2006	Oruvan		
2007	Big B	Anthakaram Babu	
2007	Mission 90 Days	Sivarasan	
2007	Panthaya Kozhi		
2007	November Rain	Sali	
2007	Abraham & Lincoln	Usman	
2007	Veeralipattu	Chandu	
2007	Indrajith	Jamal	
2007	Kangaroo	'Syringe' Vasu	
2007	Thavalam	Gauri	
2008	Thalappavu	Karunan	
2008	Sulthan	Vivek	
2009	Kancheepurathe Kalyanam		
2009	Swa Le	Ramanathan	
2009	Bhagavan		
2009	Passenger		
2009	Vairam: Fight for Justice		
2009	Loud Speaker	Bachelor	Cameo appearance
2009	Kerala Cafe		Segment "Island Express"
2010	Yugapurushan		
2010	Thanthonni		
2010	Swantham Bharya Zindabad		
2010	Punyam Aham	Pankan	
2010	Nayakan		
2010	Pranchiyettan and the Saint	Varghese	
2010	Textbook		
2010	Chekavar	Udumpu Rocky	
2010	Best Actor	Salam	
2011	Mithram		
2011	Violin	Freddy	
2011	Seniors	Police Officer	
2011	Three Kings		
2012	Thiruvambadi Thampan		
2012	Ezham Suryan	Danny	
2013	Celluloid	Sundararaj	
2013	Kallante Makan	Police	
2013	Memories	Antony	50th film
2013	Tourist Home	Rajeev	
2013	Punyalan Agarbattis	Abhayakumar	
2013	Vedivazhipadu	Pradeep	
2014	Flat No.4B	Krishnajith S Vijayan	
2014	Kerala Today	Kadavul Shaju	
2014	100 Degree Celsius		
2014	Mathai Kuzhappakkaranalla	Sudhan	
2014	Iyobinte Pusthakam	Young Comrade	
2015	Urumbukal Urangarilla	Chooden Rajappan	
2015	Oru Second Class Yathra	Balagopal	
2015	Mariyam Mukku	Lorenze	
2015	Swargathekkal Sundaram	NRI	
2015	Kanthari	Rocky	
2015	The Bail		
2015	Marutha		
2015	Mumbai Taxi		
2016	Aakashvani	Shibu	
2016	Karinkunnam 6's	Barnabas	
2016	Zoom		
2016	Anyarku Praveshanamilla	Black mani	
2017	Ramante Eden Thottam	Salim	
2017	Godha	Vijayan	
2017	Punyalan Private Limited	Abhayakumar	
2017	Ramaleela	Siby Chako	
2018	Queen	Minister	
2018	Tanaha	James	Lead role
2019	Thrissur Pooram	police officer	100th film
2019	The Gambinos		
2020	B Nilavarayum Sharjahpalliyum		
2021	Varky	Paily	
2022	Meppadiyan	Sub Inspector	
2022	Pathonpatham Noottandu		
2022	Mukundan Unni Associates	Clerk Satheeshan	
2022	Aaraattu	Police officer	
2022	Kallan D'Souza	CPO Sukumaran	
2022	Jo and Jo	Police officer	Cameo appearance
2022	Malikappuram	Ambadi	
2023	Kaipola		
2023	Bhagavan Dasante Ramrajyam	Member Rajeevan	
2023	Jailer	Keshavan	
2023	Pulli		
2024	LLB: Life Line of Bachelors	Krishna Prasad	
2024	Anchakkallakokkan	Chaapra	
2024	Nadikar		
2024	Marco	Mathew Devassy	
2024	Manasa Vacha		
2024	Gangs of Sukumara Kurup		
2024	Kuttante Shinigami		
2024	Thrayam		
2025	Rekhachithram	Young Pallasheri	
2025	Maruvasham		
2025	Thudarum	Police officer	
2025	Lovely	Bombay Shibu	
2025	Sumathi Valavu	Sudhakaran	
2026	Koodothram		
2026	Varavu †	TBA	
TBA	Velleppam †	TBA	

=== Tamil films ===
Year	Title	Role	Notes
2012	Kumki	Forest Officer	
2012	Vettai	Surulai	
2013	Madha Yaanai Koottam	Ponram	
2016	Kathakali	Inspector Saravana Vadivel	
2017	Aayirathil Iruvar	Thilak Prabhu	
2018	Asuravadham	Muthukalai	
2026	Aazhi		

=== Steaming television ===
Year	Title	Role	Language	Platform	Notes
2024	Nagendran's Honeymoons	Yusuf	Malayalam	Disney+ Hotstar	
2024	Manorathangal	Broker Balu	Malayalam	ZEE5	Anthology series; Segment: Vilpana
2024	Snakes and Ladders		Tamil	Amazon Prime Video	

=== As dubbing artist ===
- Pranchiyettan and the Saint - voice for T. G. Ravi
- Ashwaroodan - voice for T. G. Ravi

== Controversies ==
He was arrested in 2016 for public indecency, where he flashed 14 schoolgirls in Palakkad, though he was released on bail. He was again arrested in July 2022 for flashing naked in front of two minors. He was denied bail and was remanded for seven days. The court, considering that he was undergoing treatment for a behavioural disorder for the past six years, was granted bail on condition that the bail would get cancelled if he was found guilty of similar offenses again.
