= Pralayashesham Oru Jalakanyaka =

2025 Malayalam film by Manoju Kumar

- Theatrical Release Poster
- Directed by: Manoju Kumar
- Written by: Manoju Kumar
- Screenplay by: Navas Sulthan; Manoju Kumar
- Produced by: Kerala State Film Development Corporation
- Starring: Asha Aravind; Renjith Lalitham; Anagha Maria Varghese; Arjun Ambat
- Cinematography: Harikrishnan Lohithadas
- Edited by: Mendos Antony
- Music by: Vijay P Jacob
- Release date: 7 March 2025
- Country: India
- Language: Malayalam

Pralayashesham Oru Jalakanyaka is a 2025 Malayalam language film written and directed by Manoju Kumar featuring Asha Aravind, Renjith Lalitham, Anagha Maria Varghese and Arjun Ambat in the lead roles.

== Cast ==
- Asha Aravind as Plamena
- Priya Babu as Velutha Mary
- Arjun Radhakrishnan Ambat as Antappan
- Vinod Kumar as Sunny
- Karuna Kukki as Rosily
- Shybin K. P. as Rosily's Husband
- Anagha Maria Varghese as Anita
- A. M. Sidhique as Police Officer
- P.R.Rajasekharan (Rajasekharan Thakazhy) as Minister Varkey
- Gloria Shaji as The Nun
- Ranjith Lalitham as Maaliyakkel Lui
- Gokulan as Thief
