= Punyalan Agarbattis =

Punyalan Agarbathis
- Theatrical poster
- Directed by: Ranjith Sankar
- Written by: Ranjith Sankar
- Screenplay by: Ranjith Sankar; Anil Kurian; Abhayakumar
- Produced by: Jayasurya; Ranjith Sankar
- Starring: Jayasurya; Nyla Usha; Aju Varghese; Rachana Narayanankutty; Innocent; Sreejith Ravi
- Cinematography: Sujith Vassudev
- Edited by: Lijo Paul
- Music by: Bijibal
- Production company: Dreams N Beyond
- Distributed by: Central Pictures
- Release date: 29 November 2013
- Country: India
- Language: Malayalam
- Box office: ₹7 crore (Kerala alone)

Punyalan Agarbattis (transl. Saint Incense Sticks) is a 2013 Indian Malayalam-language satirical comedy film written, directed and co-produced by Ranjith Sankar, starring Jayasurya, Nyla Usha, Aju Varghese, Rachana Narayanankutty, Innocent, and Sreejith Ravi. It follows the tale of the young entrepreneur Joy Thakkolkaran (Jayasurya), and his business venture "Punyalan Agarbattis" in the city of Thrissur. The film is produced by Jayasurya and Ranjith Sankar under the banner of Dreams N Beyond and features music composed by Bijibal. It was a commercial success at the box office. A sequel of the film, 'Punyalan Private Limited' was made in 2017, and included many of the members of the original cast. A third instalment of this franchise is in development.

== Plot ==
The movie follows the inspiring tale of an entrepreneur, Joy Thakolkaaran, who owns a firm named 'Punyalan Agarbathis'. The firm is involved in the production of incense sticks from elephant dung. The first half moves around how it becomes nearly impossible for him to acquire the necessary raw material (elephant dung), and when he finally does acquire it, the devil follows him in the form of a hartal (general strike). Struggling between the deadline given by the court and the unexpected hartal, he decides to smuggle the raw material on the day of the hartal. When the RIP followers get wind of this, they attack Joy and destroy his godown and means of transportation. The rest of the movie revolves around how Joy is pressured by various problems around him and how help comes from the unexpected. The party uses different methods to mentally depreciate Joy. However, he overcomes them with his optimistic attitude and his friends and family. At the end of the movie, the tagline reads "You can conquer the whole world if you are ready to believe in yourself"

== Cast ==
- Jayasurya as Joy Thakkolkaran
- Aju Varghese as Greenu Sharma
- Nyla Usha as Anu Joy
- Sreejith Ravi as Abhayakumar (Thuthuru)
- Innocent as John Thakkolkaran, Joy's grandfather
- Rachana Narayanankutty as Advocate Remya
- T. G. Ravi as Achuthan Maash, a social worker
- Idavela Babu as K C Mathews
- Mala Aravindan as Ayyappan
- Sunil Sukhada as Magistrate
- Shivaji Guruvayoor as Advocate Hassan Marakkar
- Gokulan as Jimbruttan
- Lishoy as Joy's uncle
- Jayaraj Warrier as Kaattalan Jose
- Sabumon Abdusamad as Idivettu Sabu
- Thesni Khan as Gracy
- Ponnamma Babu as Usha
- Irshad as Amal
- Vinod Kovoor as Pappan Kottaparambu
- Sudheer Karamana as Kollur Jayaprakash
- Sunil Babu as Mahout Eldho

== Production ==
Jayasurya was selected to play the lead and Nyla Usha his wife. The popular senior actor Innocent was cast to play the grandfather of hero.

The filming began at Thrissur on 17 August 2013.

== Release ==
The film was released on 29 December 2013.

It was both a commercial and critical success. The film collected ₹7 crore from Kerala box office.

== Soundtrack ==
Punyalan Agarbattis

Soundtrack album to Punyalan Agarbattis by Bijibal
- Released: 2013
- Recorded: 2013
- Genre: Feature film soundtrack
- Length: 25:43
- Language: Malayalam
- Producer: Bijibal

Bijibal chronology
Daivathinte Swantham Cleetus (2013)	Punyalan Agarbattis (2013)	..... (2013)

Bijibal composed the background score and songs. The film marked the debut of Jayasurya as a singer in films. The lyrics are written by Santhosh Varma.

Track	Song title	Singer(s)
1	"Poorangalude Pooram"	P. Jayachandran
2	"Aashichavan"	Jayasurya
3	"Esho Parayunna"	Arun Alat
