= Kamala (film) =

- Directed by: Ranjith Sankar
- Written by: Ranjith Sankar
- Produced by: Ranjith Sankar
- Starring: Ruhani Sharma; Aju Varghese; Anoop Menon; Biju Sopanam
- Cinematography: Shehnad Jalal
- Edited by: Adhil N. Asharaf
- Music by: Anand Madhusoodanan
- Production company: Dreams N Beyond
- Distributed by: Dreams N Beyond
- Release date: 29 November 2019
- Running time: 124 minutes
- Country: India
- Language: Malayalam

Kamala is a 2019 Indian Malayalam-language thriller film written, produced and directed by Ranjith Sankar. The film stars Ruhani Sharma in the title role, with Aju Varghese playing the male lead. It also features Anoop Menon and Biju Sopanam in supporting roles. The film's music was composed by Anand Madhusoodanan while Shehnad Jalal served as the cinematographer. Kamala was theatrically released on 29 November 2019.

== Plot ==
Kamala follows 36 hours in the life of Safar (Aju Varghese), a real-estate broker, and Kamala (Ruhani Sharma), a mysterious traveller whom Safar met during a brokerage six months prior to the events of the film. Kamala travels to Athirappilly to meet Safar, who is in the middle of a tribal land deal. Safar takes her to his friend's resort in the middle of Athirappilly forest where he plans to make a move on her. Kamala, who appears to have ulterior motives, goes missing. The movie progresses through Safar's search for Kamala's real identity and her motives.

== Cast ==
- Ruhani Sharma as Kamala
- Aju Varghese as Safar
- Anoop Menon as Agasthy
- Biju Sopanam as Ravi
- Rajendran as Thoothukudi Raja
- Sunil Sukhada as Pappachan
- Anjana Appukuttan as Malathi
- Sreeja Shyam as news anchor Priya
- Gokulan as an activist

== Production ==
The film was produced by Ranjith Sankar for Dreams N Beyond.

The film opened with positive response from critics and praised Aju Varghese's performance.
