= Anees Nadodi =

Indian film production designer

- Anees Nadodi
- Born: Chelari, India
- Education: M. A. in Mass Communication and Journalism
- Alma mater: University of Calicut
- Occupations: Production designer, Art director
- Years active: 2016–present
- Notable work: Sudani from Nigeria; Varathan; Luca; Kappela; Dhoomam
- Awards: National Film Award for Best Production Design
- Website: http://aneesnadodi.com

Anees Nadodi is an Indian production designer and art director who works in Malayalam cinema. He debuted with the 2018 movie Sudani from Nigeria. He is the winner of National Film Award for Best Production Design for the 2020 film Kappela.

== Early life and education ==
Anees Nadodi was born in Chelari, Malappuram. He is a postgraduate in Mass Communication and Journalism from SAFI Institute of Advanced Study. He worked as an assistant lecturer of journalism in MIC College, Malappuram before starting his film career. In his early days as a prop-artist, Anees and his friends founded Kakka Artisans, an upcycle art company that concentrated on Found objects.

== Career ==
Anees Nadodi started his career by doing art direction for a music video, Funeral of A Native Son, directed by Muhsin Parari. Later, he worked as an assistant art director on films like Tiyaan, Adam Joan, Nimir etc.. His first independent movie was the 2018 film Sudani from Nigeria, directed by Zakariya Mohammed. Sameer Thahir, one of the producers of the movie, suggested Anees Nadodi to Amal Neerad for his next film, Varathan, which was released later in 2018. Nadodi's work for the movie was well appreciated, especially for the violent fight sequence using household goods.

His next films were Thamaasha and the Tovino Thomas starrer Luca. Anees Nadodi joined Luca as a replacement, but the crew was impressed with him, and the looks and artistic personality of the titular character, Luca, a talented artist, were redesigned based on those of Anees Nadodi. Also, it was Nadodi's suggestion to make Luca a scrap artist rather than just a painter.

His next movie to release was Kappela, which won him the National Film Award for Best Production Design.

== Filmography ==
As Art Director/ Production Designer
Year	Title	Notes
2018	Sudani from Nigeria	
2018	Varathan	
2019	Thamaasha	
2019	Luca	
2020	Kappela	Won: National Film Award for Best Production Design
2020	Halal Love Story	
2021	Kanakam Kaamini Kalaham	
2022	Mahaveeryar	
2022	Saturday Night	
2022	The Teacher	
2023	Ntikkakkakkoru Premondarnn	
2023	Sulaikha Manzil	
2023	Anuragam	
2023	Jackson Bazaar Youth	
2023	Dhoomam	
2023	Garudan	
2024	Aattam	
2024	Qalb	
2024	Manorathangal	Segment: Kazhcha
2024	Marivillin Gopurangal	
2025	Ennu Swantham Punyalan	
2025	Identity	
2025	Bazooka	
2025	Mindiyum Paranjum †	
TBA	Dear Students †	

== Awards ==
Year	Award	Film	Notes
2021	National Film Award for Best Production Design	Kappela	
