= 1001 Nunakal =

2022 Indian film directed by Thamar KV

- Promotional release poster
- Directed by: Thamar KV
- Written by: Thamar KV; Hashim Sulaiman
- Produced by: Salim Ahamed
- Starring: Vishnu Agasthya; Remya Suresh; Zhinz Shan; Vidhya Vijaykumar
- Cinematography: Jithin Stanislaus
- Edited by: Nishadh Yusuf
- Music by: Neha Nair; Yakzan Gary Pereira
- Production company: Allens Media
- Distributed by: SonyLIV
- Release dates: 11 December 2022 (IFFK); 18 August 2023 (SonyLIV)
- Running time: 106 minutes
- Country: India
- Language: Malayalam

1001 Nunakal (transl. Thousand and One Lies), also known as Aayirathonnu Nunakal, is a 2022 Indian Malayalam-language drama film directed by Thamar KV in his directorial debut and produced by Salim Ahamed. The film premiered in the Malayalam Cinema Today category at the 27th International Film Festival of Kerala in December 2022. The plot revolves around a group of friends who decide to play a game of truth or dare at a wedding anniversary party. Critics have noted the plot setting being similar to that of 2016 Italian film Perfect Strangers.

The film was officially announced in November 2021 by Salim Ahamed in the United Arab Emirates. Principal photography began in May 2022 and wrapped up in June 2022 in Ajman. The cinematography and editing were handled by Jithin Stanislaus and Nishadh Yusuf. The music is composed by Neha Nair and Yakzan Gary Pereira.

1001 Nunakal premiered on SonyLIV on 18 August 2023.

== Plot ==
After a fire breaks out in a flat in Al Khobar, Rajesh, his wife Soumya, their children, and Mujeeb and his pregnant wife Salma, temporarily move into their friends Vinay and Divya's house. The next day, Elvin arrives at Vinay's residence for new passports for Rajesh and Mujeeb's families. When Elvin asks Salma for their photos for new passports, she checks the bag Mujeeb has brought. She gets a girl's photo from it and has no idea who it is. Indu works as a maid in Vinay's home. Anil, her husband, works for a company and is experiencing financial difficulties. He must repay money to his manager or risk losing his job.

While seeing a matrimonial commercial, Vinay tells everyone about how he and Divya eloped and married ten years ago. Divya then tells everyone that the following day is their tenth wedding anniversary. When everyone sits down for dinner, Mujeeb mentions that they would be departing the next day. But Vinay insists that they leave only after attending their anniversary party. After the meal, Salma questions Mujeeb about the girl's photo and Mujeeb claims he knows nothing about the girl. Divya wishes to invite Joffy and Aleena to Vinay's party. Vinay agrees and suggests they should also call Vakeel. Meanwhile, Anil's manager demands that the money be returned within two days. Anil asks Shaleel to return the money he gave him and gets angry with Shaleel when he expresses his inability to repay due to his financial situation.

Joffy and Aleena arrive at Vinay's house bearing a wedding anniversary cake. Elvin also attends the party with his wife, Benzy. Anil contacts Indu and requests to borrow some money. But she is unable to ask for money in the midst of the wedding anniversary. After Vakeel's arrival, everyone celebrates the wedding anniversary by cutting the cake. Rajesh inquires about the gift from Vinay. Soon, he gifts Divya a pricey Rolex watch. Aleena looks at the price of the watch on her phone and tells everyone. Anil, who is forced to return the money to his manager, calls Indu again. But she is helpless. While everyone is having a nice time at the party, Jayan and Lakshmi's divorce is being discussed. Vakeel says that their marriage ended because Lakshmi lied. He then challenges everyone to reveal a lie they have told each other. But only Aleena and Salma express interest. Elvin suggests that they continue once the food has been prepared. Joffy starts the game by revealing a lie he told Aleena before their marriage. Following Joffy's turn, Aleena discloses a lie she told him. Next, Benzy reveals a truth she has been hiding from Elvin. Elvin becomes dejected and goes outside. When everyone heads out, Indu steals the watch and tells Anil about it.

As they all gather to eat, Aleena talks about continuing the game. When Soumya says not to discuss that topic anymore, Aleena says they don't have the guts to open up. But Rajesh takes it as a challenge and reveals that he unknowingly helped a relative of Soumya financially. Mujeeb reaches there just as Soumya starts to speak. Then Salma goes to the room with Mujeeb and says that it is enough to make up a story and tell it when friends ask. Soumya questions Rajesh about why he hid the matter of helping her uncle and getting a new job offer letter. Rajesh gets angry and leaves. Divya blames Vakeel for causing problems between everyone. Meanwhile, Elvin takes the initiative to resolve his feud with Benzy. Salma narrates a fictional story to everyone. But Mujeeb reveals his true love story. Hearing this, Salma gets upset and says it is a fake story. But when Mujeeb says that this actually happened and that the photo in his bag is of his former girlfriend, an argument arises between the two.

Vakeel's wife, Molly, makes a video call to Divya. Divya goes to the room to show the watch she got as an anniversary gift. She informs Vinay that the watch is missing. Then everyone searches the entire room for the watch. Rajesh suspects that it was taken by Indu, who was there at the time. But Divya has faith in her. Aleena says that only Rajesh, Mujeeb, and Salma came in when everyone was outside. Rajesh gets angry after Joffy defends Aleena. Elvin asks that the incident be reported to the police. But Vakeel tells Indu to turn off all the lights in the room and asks whoever took the watch to put it on the table. When no one is ready, he decides to call the police. Seeing the problems getting worse, Vinay tries to calm them. He pleads that it was actually a cheap watch and that there should be no issues with it being stolen. Then everyone leaves. When Indu comes out after work and tells Anil about the watch, Anil slaps her and returns home angrily.

== Cast ==
- Sudeep Koshy as Rajesh
- Shamla Hamza as Salma
- Vishnu Agasthya as Vinay
- Niiniin Kassim as Divya
- Sajin Ali Pulakkal as Mujeeb
- Remya Suresh as Indu
- Zhinz Shan as Anil
- Anusha Shyam as Soumya
- Vidhya Vijaykumar as Aleena
- Noufal Rahman as Joffy
- Sooraj K. Nambiar as Elwin
- Rashmi K. Nair as Benzy
- Sudheesh Scaria as Vakeel
- Abhilash as Manager
- Ahmad Shaheen as Shaleel
- Sayhan Hashik as Mujeeb and Salma's son
- Yara Khalid as Vinay and Divya's daughter
- Rayan as Rajesh and Soumya's son
- Rayeen as Rajesh and Soumya's son

== Production ==
=== Development ===
The story for the film was written during 2016–17. 1001 Nunakal was announced in November 2021 in Dubai by Salim Ahamed, who previously directed And the Oscar Goes To... (2019) and Pathemari (2015).

=== Casting ===
The makers of the film considered newcomers instead of leading actors to play the lead characters. The actors were chosen from auditions in Kerala and the United Arab Emirates, with nine coming from the UAE and four from Kerala. The first round audition was held in Dubai from 26 to 31 December 2021, while the second round audition was held at the same venue from 5 March to 6 March 2022.

=== Filming ===
The principal photography of the film began on 12 May 2022. The shooting started after a seven-day acting camp under Jijoy Rajagopal. The film was shot entirely in the United Arab Emirates, with majority of the filming taking place at a villa in Ajman. Filming was wrapped up on 5 June 2022 in Ajman.

== Music ==
Neha Nair and Yakzan Gary Pereira composed the film's music.

No.	Title	Lyrics	Singer(s)	Length
1.	"Oro Manavum" (Theme song)	Anwar Ali	Anne Amie	4:05
2.	"Vattathilulloru Ambili Mamane"	Thamar K. V.	Anuj Sekhar	2:26

== Release ==
=== Film festival ===
1001 Nunakal had its premiere at the 27th International Film Festival of Kerala (IFFK) in December 2022. It was selected for the Malayalam Cinema Today category by a committee headed by R. Sarath, along with 11 other films. The film had three screenings at the festival, the first and second on 11 and 12 December at the Kalabhavan and Kairali Sree Nila theatres of Kerala State Film Development Corporation, and the third on 14 December at the Aries Plex theatre.

=== Home media ===
After its appearance at the IFFK, the digital rights of 1001 Nunakal were obtained by SonyLIV, which started streaming it on 18 August 2023. Apart from Malayalam, it was released in Tamil, Kannada, Telugu, and Hindi.

== Reception ==
=== Critical response ===
1001 Nunakal received positive reviews from critics.

Swathi P. Ajith of Onmanorama wrote "Thamar's 'Aayirathonnu Nunakal' is undoubtedly a commendable effort, although a bit more focus and sharpening around the edges could have elevated its impact." Arjun Ramachandran of The South First gave 3.5 out of 5 stars and wrote "Aayirathonnu Nunakal is an overwhelming movie that dwells on the lives of married couples. It makes the audience think seriously about relationships." Anandu Suresh of The Indian Express gave 3.5 out of 5 stars and wrote "Thamar KV's Aayirathonnu Nunakal (1001 Lies) explores the complexities of both lies and absolute candour, while refraining from definitively advocating for one over the other, allowing viewers to form their own opinions." Sajin Shrijith of The New Indian Express gave 4 out of 5 stars and wrote "1001 Nunakal is an impressive debut shot with the finesse of a veteran."

S. R. Praveen of The Hindu wrote "Though the storyline constantly reminds one of Jeethu Joseph and Mohanlal's '12th Man,' director Thamar K.V succeeds in keeping the narrative engaging." Anna Mathews of The Times of India gave the film 3.5 out of 5 stars and wrote "1001 Nunakal has one of those 'been there done that' feels, with the story device being of people coming together and swapping secrets that could be the undoing of themselves and the group dynamics." Sowmya Rajendran of The News Minute gave 3.5 out of 5 stars and wrote "There are too few films that see potential in the drama of everyday life, the pathos in the ordinary, and that's what makes 1001 Nunakal such a riveting watch." Ryan Gomez of OTTPlay gave 3 out of 5 stars and wrote "1001 Nunakal is a taut drama that places Malayali marriages under the microscope. The slow-burner indie film leans on a few familiar plot devices but offers a fresh perspective on the subject through a unique lens." Nandini Ramnath of Scroll.in wrote "Among the revelations that emerge during the Truth or Dare exercise is that reticence is a necessary attribute of romantic relationships. In an age of performativeness fuelled by social media, the insights of Aayirathonnu Nunakal especially ring true."
