= Shaheen Siddique =

Indian actor (born 1989)

- Born: 21 February 1989 (age 37); Ernakulam, Kerala, India
- Occupation: Film actor
- Years active: 2015–present
- Spouse: Amrutha Das
- Parent: Siddique (father)

Shaheen Siddique (born 21 February 1989) is an Indian actor who appears in Malayalam films. The son of film actor Siddique, Shaheen made his debut with the Malayalam film Pathemari (2015) directed by National Award winner Salim Ahamed. He plays the role of Mammootty's son in the film. He also starred in director G. Marthandan's second directorial venture titled Acha Dhin (2015).

== Personal life ==
Shaheen was born on 21 February 1989, Ernakulam, Kerala in India to actor Siddique and Seena. His brother Rasheen died in June 2024 due to respiratory disorder. His uncle Abdul Majeed is also an actor who appears in Malayalam films.

He completed his schooling from The Choice School. After his education, Shaheen took business as his career, appearing in films occasionally.

He is married to Amrutha Das with whom he has a daughter, born on July 10, 2024.

== Film career ==
Shaheen was invited to make his filmy debut in Pathemari (2015) directed by Salim Ahamed. He plays a guy in his early 20s, the son of Pallickkal Narayanan and Nalini played by Mammootty and Jewel Mary respectively. Siddique also plays an important role in the movie, but there are no combination scenes of the father and the son. He has also starred in director G. Marthandan's second directorial venture titled Acha Din. Shaheen acted in a short film titled, 'The Backstager' in early 2018 which was released on June 5. He got two awards for this short film. Second Best Actor in Kerala State Television Awards 2018 and Best Actor in CONTACT short film festival 2019.

== Awards ==
Award	Category	Movie	Year
Kerala State Television Award	Second Best Actor	The Backstager	2018
CONTACT Film Award	Best Actor	The Backstager	2019

== Filmography ==
Key
†	Denotes films that have not yet been released

Year	Title	Role	Notes
2015	Pathemari	Satheesh	
2016	Kasaba	Arjun	
2017	Take Off	Malayali terrorist	
2017	Diwanjimoola Grand Prix	Young Jithendran	
2018	The Backstager	Vivek	Short film
2018	Oru Kuttanadan Blog	Rameshan	
2018	Ottakoru Kaamukan	Rahul Rajashekaran	
2019	Vijay Superum Pournamiyum	Salman	
2019	Mr. & Ms. Rowdy	Domenic	
2022	Salute	Mahesh	
2022	Shefeekkinte Santhosham	Anwar	
2023	Christopher	Sebastian Chacko	
2023	Sesham Mike-il Fathima	Solomon Margaret	
2024	Oru Anweshanathinte Thudakkam		
2025	Rekhachithram	Young Rajendran	
2025	Besty	Faisi	
2025	Ambalamukkile Visheshangal		
2026	Patriot	Vignesh	
2026	Udumbanchola Vision		
