= Mindiyum Paranjum =

Malayalam feature film

- Theatrical release poster
- Directed by: Arun Bose
- Written by: Arun Bose; Mridul George
- Produced by: Salim Ahamed
- Starring: Unni Mukundan; Aparna Balamurali
- Cinematography: Madhu Ambat
- Edited by: Kiran Das
- Music by: Sooraj S. Kurup
- Production company: Allens Media
- Distributed by: Jaguar Studios
- Release date: 25 December 2025
- Running time: 102 minutes
- Country: India
- Language: Malayalam

Mindiyum Paranjum is a 2025 Indian Malayalam-language drama film directed by Arun Bose and produced by Salim Ahamed under the studio Allens Media. The film is co-written by Mridul George starring Unni Mukundan and Aparna Balamurali in lead roles. Madhu Ambat is the cinematographer and Sooraj S. Kurup the music director. The film received U Certificate and premiered at Indian Film Festival, Alberta. The film is an independent adaptation of O. Henry's 1905 short story The Gift of the Magi.

== Plot ==
Amidst a symphony of raindrops, Sanal (Unni Mukundan) leaves from Cochin Airport, traversing the mystical, rugged landscapes of Idukki to embrace his lifelong cherished dream with Leena (Aparna Balamurali). As they travel along the winding roads, a tapestry of memories comes flooding in—joyful, sorrowful, tender, and enduring, woven with threads of love and longing.

== Cast ==
- Unni Mukundan as Sanal
- Aparna Balamurali as Leena Varghese
- Jaffar Idukki as Varghese
- Jude Anthany Joseph as Basil
- Mala Parvathi as Sanal's Mother
- Sohan Seenulal as Manoj
- RJ Vijitha as Shyni
- Sanju Madhu as Saju
- Geethi Sangeethi as Chinnamma
- RJ Murugan as Broker Shaji
- Shiva Hariharan as Kannan
- Noufal Rahman as Shabin
- Prasanth Murali as Taxi driver Biju
- Athira Suresh as Sheeja
- Sherly Adimali as Peramma

== Production ==
Mindiyum Paranjum is the third feature film directorial of filmmaker Arun Bose and second writing collaboration between Mridul George and Arun Bose after Luca. Production is controlled by Alex E Kurian while Gayathri Kishore handled the costumes department, the art director is Anees Nadodi, Madhu Ambat is the cinematographer and Sooraj S. Kurup composed the songs.

== Soundtrack ==
The soundtrack for Mindiyum Paranjum was composed by Sooraj S. Kurup. Songs were released by Sony Music.

Title	Sung By	Written By	Duration
Neeye Nenjil	Mridula Warrier, Sooraj S Kurup	Sujesh Hari	3:20
Manalu Parunnori	Shahabaz Aman	Sujesh Hari	2:45
Ithale	Aparna Balamurali	Sujesh Hari	3:11

== Release ==
=== Theatrical ===
The shooting of the film was completed in 2022 but no release date was confirmed till December 2025. The film was released on 25 December 2025

=== Home Media ===
The digital streaming rights of the film is acquired by Sun NXT and Amazon Prime and is streaming now in both. In MENA countries the film is now streaming in StarzPlay

== Reception ==
=== Critical reception ===
The film received positive reviews from critics as well as the audience. The Hollywood Reporter India said that the Aparna Balamurali and Unni Mukundan's Long-Distance Relationship Drama is a Thing of Joy. Anjana George from Time Of India gave 3.5/5 rating for the movie and said that Mindiyum Paranjum is a delicate, emotionally resonant film that stays with you long after it ends.

=== Viewership ===
Within a week of its digital release, the film set a record by achieving fastest 50 million streaming minutes on Sun NXT.
