= Antony (2023 film) =

2023 Malayalam-language film by Joshiy

- Theatrical release poster
- Directed by: Joshiy
- Written by: Rajesh Varma
- Produced by: Einstin Zac Paul
- Starring: Joju George; Kalyani Priyadarshan; Chemban Vinod Jose; Nyla Usha
- Cinematography: Renadive
- Edited by: Shyam Sasidharan
- Music by: Jakes Bejoy
- Production companies: Einstin Media; Nextel Studios; Ultra Media & Entertainment
- Distributed by: Dream Big Films
- Release date: 1 December 2023
- Running time: 146 minutes
- Country: India
- Language: Malayalam

Antony is a 2023 Indian Malayalam-language action drama film directed by Joshiy and written by Rajesh Varma. The film stars Joju George in the title role, alongside Kalyani Priyadarshan, Chemban Vinod Jose, Nyla Usha, Asha Sharath, Appani Sarath, and Vijayaraghavan.

The film was officially announced in April 2023 and principal photography commenced in May 2023 in Vellikulam. The filming wrapped up in August 2023. The music was composed by Jakes Bejoy, while the cinematography and editing were handled by Renadive and Shyam Sasidharan. Antony was released on 1 December 2023.

== Plot ==
Antony Anthrapper is a ruthless gangster who accidentally kills a local goon named Xavier and becomes the guardian of Xavier's daughter, Ann Maria, an aggressive college student trained in MMA. Antony and Maria's presence in each other's lives reforms their violent ways until a forgotten foe named Tarzan arrives to finish them. Antony and Maria set out to overcome the threat using violent ways to lead a peaceful life.

== Cast ==
- Joju George as Antony Anthrapper
  - Amal Shah as Young Antony
- Kalyani Priyadarshan as Ann Maria, Antony's adopted daughter
- Nyla Usha as Maya
- Asha Sharath as Jessy, Ann's mother
- Chemban Vinod Jose as Fr. Paul Kattakayam
- Vijayaraghavan as Avaran, Antony's adopted father
- Hariprashanth M G as Tarzan, Vedakku Xavier's younger brother
- Giju John as James
- Jinu Joseph as Lawrence
- Appani Sarath as Keecheri Simon, Lawrence's henchman
- Binu Pappu as Chacko Anthrapper, Antony's father
- Sijoy Varghese as College Principal John Fernandez
- Jewel Mary as Priyamvadha / Priya
- Tini Tom as Vedakku Xavier
- RJ Shaan as Ratheesh
- Padmaraj Ratheesh as Johnnykutty
- Rajesh Sharma as Manoj
- Sudheer Karamana as Kandankeri Narayanan
- Srikant Murali as CI Pramod
- Assim Jamal as SI Martin
- Kottayam Ramesh as Adv. Madhavan
- Mohan Raman as Adv. Dhandapani

== Production ==
=== Development ===
The film marks the second collaboration between Joju George and Joshiy after Porinju Mariam Jose (2019). From the Porinju Mariam Jose team, Joshiy also retained Nyla Usha, Chemban Vinod Jose, and Vijayaraghavan. Kalyani Priyadarshan was signed to play the role of a professional boxer in the film. The story and screenplay are written by Rajesh Varma who previously worked in Upacharapoorvam Gunda Jayan (2022) and Life of Josutty (2015). Einstin Zac Paul produced the film under his banner Einstin Media. The film's title launch and pooja were held at Crowne Plaza hotel in Kochi on 14 April 2023.

=== Filming ===
Principal photography began on 5 May 2023 with a pooja ceremony. Vellikulam, Vagamon and parts of Tamil Nadu were the main shooting locations. The filming wrapped up on 27 August 2023 in Erattupetta after a 70-day shoot.

== Music ==
The music was composed by Jakes Bejoy and the audio rights were acquired by Saregama.

== Release ==
=== Theatrical ===
Antony was theatrically released on 1 December 2023 in Malayalam. The theatrical distribution rights were acquired by Dream Big Films.

=== Home media ===
The film was digitally streamed on Amazon Prime Video. It is also available in Hindi & Marathi language dubbed versions currently streaming on Ultra Play & Ultra Jhakaas app respectively.

== Reception ==
=== Critical response ===
Anjana George of The Times of India gave 3.5 out of 5 stars and wrote, "Antony is a soulful Malayalam movie, resonating with the charm of yesteryear cinema. The characters evoke emotions with depth and nuances, crafting a gripping story. It transcends a mere bloodshedding drama, portraying a tale of love, redemption, and the sense of belonging." Sanjith Sridharan of OTTPlay gave 3 out of 5 stars and wrote, "Antony follows the typical Joshiy-film template, but that's not necessarily a bad thing. It has enough fresh elements to keep the audience hooked to the relationship between Antony and Ann Maria, even when the rest is predictable."

Anandu Suresh of The Indian Express gave 2 out of 5 stars and wrote, "Despite having a plot that is bound to captivate Malayali audiences, Joshiy's film, starring Joju George and Kalyani Priyadarshan in the lead roles, falls flat due to sloppy writing." Sajin Shrijith of The New Indian Express gave 1.5 out of 5 stars and wrote, "One can't dismiss a few satisfyingly cathartic situations where Joju and Kalyani use their fists to teach some lessons to a few distasteful characters. But, again, when the rest of the material is so tiringly predictable, what's the point?"

Princy Alexander of Onmanorama wrote, "Antony following the stereotype of a broken boy turning goon is one of the drawbacks of this Joshiy directorial, though the makers have tried to add a whiff of freshness by including an unusual relationship in the picture." Shilpa Nair Anand of The Hindu wrote, "Antony is a typical Joshiy film; there is action, plenty of it, and emotions spread over two hours and twenty-odd minutes. But there are also points when it feels longer."
