= Mridul George =

Indian scriptwriter & author

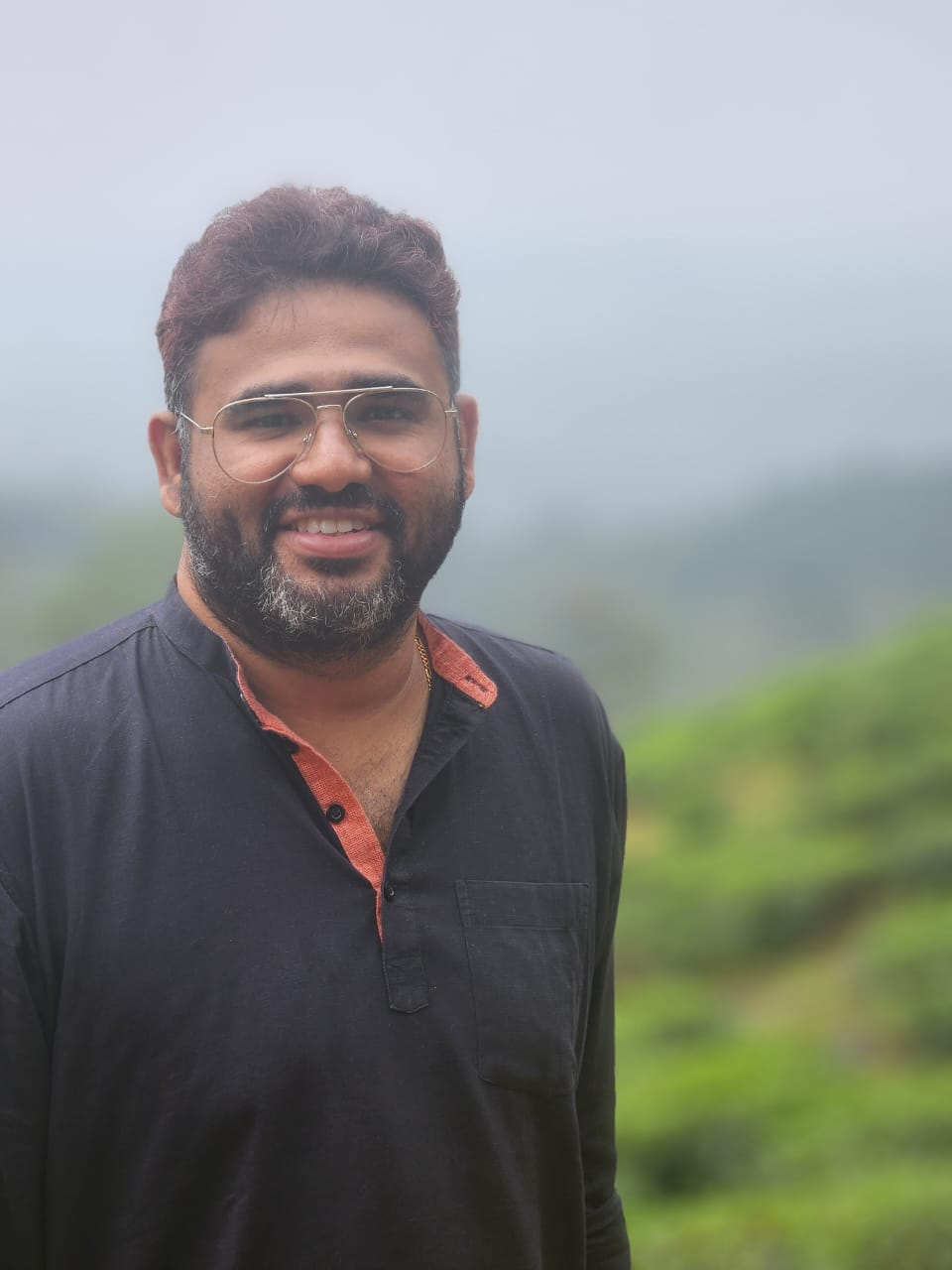
Mridul George

Mridul George (born 2 September 1987) is an Indian scriptwriter and author who works in Malayalam cinema.He made his debut with Luca (2019), co-written with director Arun Bose. His second movie, Mindiyum Paranjum is also a co-writing venture with Arun Bose. His first book titled Paathi Murinja Ticketukal was published in 2018 and is considered to be the first fan fiction book in Malayalam .In 2025, he published his second book 'Fans Talkies' through Mankind Literature, again in fan fiction genre.

== Film career ==
Mridul George penned the script for Luca along with Arun Bose. In 2023, he wrote the script for Mindiyum Paranjum directed by Arun Bose, along with the director. He also directed the short films Mattoru Katha (2016), Bhootham Bhaavi Varthamanam (2016) and Talsamayam (2020). Talsamayam made it into the 13th International Documentary & Short Film Festival of Kerala as an official entry in Non-Competition category. Mridul George wrote the screenplay for the short films Njane Kandullu (2016) and Chilappol Daivam (2022).

== Filmography ==
Year	Title	Type	Role	Director
2016	Mattoru Katha	Short Film	Writer/Director	Mridul George
2016	Bhootham Bhaavi Varthamanam	Short Film	Writer/Director	Mridul George
2016	Njane Kandullu	Short Film	Writer	Reghu Nair
2019	Luca	Feature Film	Co-written with Arun Bose	Arun Bose
2020	Talsamayam	Short film	Writer/Director	Mridul George
2022	Chilappol Daivam	Short film	Co-written with Anil Krishnan	Vishnu Raj
2024	Gandharva	Short film	Writer	Nyx Lopez
2025	Mindiyum Paranjum †	Feature film	Co-written with Arun Bose	Arun Bose

== Bibliography ==
- Fans Talkies (2025), Mankind Literature, Kozhikode
- Paathi Murinja Ticketukal (2018), Papyrus Books, Kottayam
- Luca, Lipi Publications, Kottayam
