= Nandu (Malayalam actor) =

Indian actor

- Born: Nandalal Krishnamurthy; Thiruvananthapuram, Kerala, India
- Occupation: Actor
- Years active: 1986–present
- Children: 2

Nandalal Krishnamoorthy, better known by his stage name Nandu, is an Indian actor who primarily works in Malayalam films. He has worked in the industry for more than 30 years and is acclaimed for his performance in Mohanlal's Spirit, directed by Ranjith. He was also seen in many Priyadarshan films. He received SIIMA Award for Best Supporting Actor, for Spirit.

== Personal life ==
Nandu was born in Thiruvananthapuram, to Krishnamoorthy, a table tennis coach at National Institute of Sports and Sukumari, a singer. He lost his mother 60 days after he was born, and was brought up by his uncle and aunt. His father never remarried, and died later. His first film was Sarvakalasala (1986), directed by Venu Nagavally. During his early career, most of his roles were of college background.

Nandu is married to Kavitha Nandalal, since 1997. They have a daughter, Nandita (b. 1999) and a son, Krishan (b. 2013).

== Career ==
He started his career with the Mohanlal starring film Sarvakalasala in 1986. Although he has been in the film industry for the last 20 years, he recently has been acclaimed for his performance in the Mohanlal-starring film Spirit, directed by Ranjith, although he had played good roles in the past.

== Filmography ==
=== Malayalam ===
==== 1980s ====
Year	Title	Role	Notes
1983	Oru Madapravinte Katha		
1986	Sarvakalashala	Jose Abraham	
1986	Yuvajanotsavam	Prince	
1987	Ayitham		
1989	Swagatham		
1989	Charithram		
1989	Adikkurippu	Dentist's assistant	

==== 1990s ====
Year	Title	Role	Notes
1990	Aye Auto	Lonappan	
1991	Kilukkam	Pillai's relative	
1991	Kizhakkunarum Pakshi	Anandhu's Friend	
1991	Abhimanyu		
1992	Aham		
1992	Kamaladalam	Student at Kala Mandiram	
1993	Aayirappara		
1993	Gandharvam		
1993	Butterflies	Pavithran	
1993	Mithunam	Raghu	
1993	Chenkol	Ratheesh	
1993	Kalippattam	Remanan	
1994	Thenmavin Kombath	Thimmayan	
1994	Sainyam	Salesman	
1994	Pidakkozhi Koovunna Noottandu		
1994	Kashmeeram	Sanjay	
1994	Minnaram		
1994	Vishnu	Moythootti	
1995	Mazhavilkoodaram	Subair	
1995	Nirnayam	Rajan	
1996	KL.7/95 Eranakulam North	Unni	
1996	Ishtamaanu Nooruvattam		
1996	Mookkilla Raajyathu Murimookkan Raajaavu		
1997	Ishtadaanam	Aniruddhan	
1998	Pranayavarnangal	Victor's friend	
1998	British Market	Annan Soman	
1998	Kaikudunna Nilavu	Kichamani's friend	
1998	Kottaram Veettile Apputtan	News reporter	
1998	Sundarakilladi	Pradeep	
1999	Prem Poojari		
1999	Auto Brothers		
1999	Indulekha		
1999	Varnachirakukal		
1999	Rishivamsham		

==== 2000s ====
Year	Title	Role	Notes
2000	Snehapoorvam Anna	College Student	
2000	Pilots		
2000	India Gate		
2000	Indriyam	Prof. Joseph Erumeli	
2001	Romance		
2001	Achaneyanenikkishtam	Kariyachan	
2003	Kalari Vikraman		Unreleased film
2003	Kilichundan Mampazham	Postman Rafeeq	
2003	Balettan	Sukumaran	
2003	Ammakilikkoodu		
2004	Thekkekkara Superfast		
2004	Govindankutty Thirakkilanu	Ramanan	
2004	Wanted		
2004	Vettam	Rajeevan	
2004	Vamanapuram Bus Route	Kuttappan	
2005	The Campus	'Romance' Chacko	
2005	Moksham		
2005	Kochi Rajavu		
2007	Naalu Pennungal	Narayanan	
2008	Vilapangalkkappuram	Madhavankutty	
2008	Oru Pennum Randaanum	Advocate's relative	
2008	Thirakkatha	Krishnamoorthy	
2009	Kancheepurathe Kalyanam	Jacob Koshy	
2009	Seetha Kalyanam	Shanmugham	
2009	Boomi Malayalam		

==== 2010s ====
Year	Title	Role	Notes
2010	Nilavu		
2010	Advocate Lakshmanan – Ladies Only		
2010	Kutty Srank	Vishnu	
2010	Body Guard	Ramankutty Master	
2010	Drona 2010	Nelloor Harinarayanan Namboothiri	
2011	China Town	Fr. Stephen	
2011	Sankaranum Mohananum		
2011	Priyappetta Nattukare	K P Scaria	
2011	Salt N' Pepper	Bhaskaran Nair	
2011	Teja Bhai & Family	Dr. Mahadevan Thampi	
2011	Nadakame Ulakam		
2011	Beautiful	Kamalu	
2011	City of God		
2012	Masters	Advocate Shaji Mathew	
2012	Poppins	Film producer	
2012	Ozhimuri	Thanu Pillai's servant	
2012	Hero	Sathyan	
2012	916	Dr. Harikrishnan's aide	
2012	Thiruvambadi Thampan	Rarichan	
2012	Idiots		
2012	Parudeesa	Rubber tapper	
2012	Namukku Parkkan		
2012	Josettante Hero		
2012	Trivandrum Lodge	Antony	
2012	Mullassery Madhavan Kutty Nemom P. O.	Gulabdas	
2012	Spirit	Maniyan	
2012	Karmayodha	Baburaj	
2013	Natholi Oru Cheriya Meenalla		
2013	Nakhangal	Manjila G Kumar	
2013	Amen	Philipose	
2013	Good Bad & Ugly	Marthandan	
2013	Housefull	Pookunju	
2013	97 Batch Maharajas		
2013	Pattam Pole	Fr. Joy	
2013	Vishudhan	Jose	
2013	Kadal Kadannu Oru Maathukutty	Aanandhan and himself	
2013	Kanyaka Talkies	JPK	
2013	Immanuel	Dr. Ramakrishnan	
2013	Hotel California	Annan	
2013	Kotharan Oru Malayala Cinema		
2013	Don't Worry Be Happy		
2013	Up & Down: Mukalil Oralundu	Cheriyan	
2013	ABCD: American-Born Confused Desi	Kunjachan	
2013	Daivathinte Swantham Cleetus	Lakshmi's Father	
2013	6 B Paradise		
2013	Namboothiri Yuvaavu @ 43		
2013	Ezhamathe Varavu	Raman Nair	
2013	Ms. Lekha Tharoor Kanunnathu	Nandhagopalan	
2014	Ettekaal Second		
2014	God's Own Country	Vakkachan	
2014	Thomson Villa		
2014	@Andheri		
2014	Oru Korean Padam		
2014	The Dolphins	Plamootikada Valthsan	
2014	Test Paper		
2014	Medulla Oblongata		
2014	Ottamandaaram	Bharathan	
2014	Lal Bahadur Shastri	Lal's father	
2014	Color Balloon	Vaidhyar	
2014	Aamayum Muyalum	Arcott Anthony Fernandez	
2015	Mariyam Mukku	Mullan Joseph	
2015	Utopiayile Rajavu	Nadar	
2015	Rasam	Govindan Nair	
2015	Rasputin		
2015	Thilothama		
2015	The Advocate		
2015	Thottaavaadi		
2016	Buddhanum Chaplinum Chirikkunnu		
2016	Monsoon Mangoes	D. Paulose	
2016	Karinkunnam 6's	Ambootty	
2016	Aalroopangal		
2016	Pulimurugan	Divakaran (Forest Guard)	
2017	Jomonte Suvisheshangal	Dr. Kuriakose	
2017	Munthirivallikal Thalirkkumbol	Priya's father	
2017	Sathya		
2017	Vilakkumaram		
2017	Sarvopari Palakkaran	Mani Swami	
2017	History of Joy	Judge	
2017	Thrissivaperoor Kliptham	Ambiyettan	
2017	Kadamkadha		
2017	Kuppivala		
2017	Pashu		
2017	Angu Doore Oru Deshathu		
2017	Masterpiece	Balan Master	
2017	Vimaanam		
2017	Swayam		
2018	Naam	John	
2018	Queen	Adv. Kaaloor	
2018	Street Lights	Remya's Father	
2018	Sukhamano Daveede		
2018	Mazhayathu	Narayenettan	
2018	Thanaha		
2018	Wonder Boys		
2018	Ilakal Pacha Pookkal Manja		
2018	Chandragiri		
2018	Aniyankunjum Thannaalaayathu		
2018	Ranam	Bhaskar	
2018	Odiyan	Ezhuthachan	
2018	My Story	Joseph Silva	
2019	Vaarikkuzhiyile Kolapathakam	Member Rocky	
2019	Vaarthakal Ithuvare	Chakkappan	
2019	Lucifer	P. S. Peethambaran	
2019	Ittymaani: Made in China	Roy Mathew	
2019	Manoharam	Joy	
2019	An International Local Story	Madhavan Nair	
2019	Athiran	Avirachan	
2019	Pattabhiraman	Raman Nair	
2019	Porinju Mariam Jose	Alappattu Varghese	
2019	Driving License	Driver Kunjali	

==== 2020s ====
Year	Title	Role	Notes
2020	Anveshanam	Alphonse	
2021	Sahyadriyile Chuvanna Pookkal		
2021	One	Councillor Noorudheen	
2021	Marakkar: Arabikadalinte Simham	Kuthiravattath Nair	
2021	Mickey		
2022	Lalitham Sundaram	Music Director Harikumar	
2022	12th Man	Resort Manager Davis	
2022	Twenty One Gms	Fr. Joseph	
2022	Karnan Napoleon Bhagath Singh	KP	
2022	Aaraattu	Narayana Pillai	
2022	Pathrosinte Padappukal	Priest	
2022	Vaashi	Shivakumar	
2022	Innale Vare	Aanandhan	
2022	Run Kalyani		
2022	Kaduva	SI Manmadhan	
2022	Paappan	ASI Raghavan	
2022	King Fish		
2022	Varaal	Maadayi Madhavan	
2022	The Teacher	Police Inspector	
2022	Kaapa	ASI Arumanayagam	
2022	Kshanikam		
2023	Oh My Darling	Mathews	
2023	Thrishanku	Chandrahasan Nair	
2023	Dhoomam	Minister's PA	
2023	Neru	Public Prosecutor Sajan Varghese	
2024	Anweshippin Kandethum	Head Constable Uthup	
2024	Jai Ganesh	Neerali Pavithran	
2024	Hunt		
2024	Kondal		
2024	Anand Sreebala	CI Benny	
2025	Empuraan	P. S. Peethambran	
2025	E Valayam	Anandhan	
2025	Police Day	DYSP Simon Idikkula	
2025	Sumathi Valavu		
2025	Ithiri Neram	Rajan Kunnukuzhi	
2026	Masthishka Maranam	Hariharan	
2026	Ankam Attahasam		
2026	I, Nobody		
2026	Law and Order †	TBA	

=== Other language films ===
Year	Title	Role	Language	Notes
1993	Gardish	Disruptive passerby	Hindi	
1998	Doli Saja Ke Rakhna	Fisherman	Hindi	
2003	Lesa Lesa	Nandu	Tamil	
2003	Hungama	Tejas Iyer	Hindi	
2021	Hungama 2	Doctor	Hindi	
2025	The Door	Advocate A. S. Rathinam	Tamil	
2026	G.D.N	Achudhan	Tamil	

=== As voice actor ===
Year	Title	Dubbed for	Character	Notes
2023	Alone	Himself	Flat Chief Security	

== Television ==
- Sathyam Shivam Sundaram (Amrita TV)
- Devimahathmyam (Asianet)
- Sri Mahabhagavatham (Asianet)
- Swami Ayyapan (Asianet)
- Chandrodayam (DD Malayalam)
