= Kshanikam =

2022 Malayalam film

- Release poster
- Directed by: Rajeev Rajendran
- Written by: Deepthi Nair
- Story by: Deepthi Nair
- Starring: Jewel Mary; Nandu; Rupesh Raj
- Cinematography: Aravind Anil
- Edited by: Rakesh Asoka
- Music by: Samson Silva
- Production company: R-Productions Filmy
- Release date: 6 May 2022
- Country: India
- Language: Malayalam

Kshanikam is a 2022 Malayalam language film directed by Rajeev Rajendran and written by Deepthi Nair. The features Jewel Mary, Nandu and Rupesh Raj in lead roles. The film is produced under the banner of R-Productions Filmy. The film was released on 6 May 2022.

== Cast ==
- Jewel Mary
- Nandu
- Rupesh Raj
- Meera Nair
- Harishankar

== Production ==
The first look poster of the film was released by the actor Mammootty and Jayasurya. The film was shot in Thiruvananthapuram and Wagamon. Entire shooting was completed in December 2022.

== Reception ==
Anna Mathews critic of Times of india gave 2.5 stars out of 5 and stated that "One of the problems with the movie, directed by Rajeev Rajendran. Kshanikam could have been a heartwarming film, but somewhere it misses out."
