= Pathemari =

2015 film by Salim Ahamed

- Theatrical Film poster
- Directed by: Salim Ahamed
- Written by: Salim Ahamed
- Produced by: Salim Ahamed; Adv. Hashik Thayikandy; TP Sudheesh
- Starring: Mammootty
- Cinematography: Madhu Ambat
- Edited by: Vijay Shankar
- Music by: Bijibal
- Production company: Allens Media
- Distributed by: Eros International
- Release date: 9 October 2015
- Running time: 118 minutes
- Country: India
- Language: Malayalam

Pathemari (transl. Dhow) is a 2015 Indian Malayalam-language period drama film written and directed by Salim Ahamed. The film stars Mammootty in the lead role, with a supporting cast that includes Jewel Mary, Siddique, Sreenivasan, Salim Kumar, Shaheen Siddique, Viji Chandrasekhar, and Joy Mathew. The plot follows the life of Pallikkal Narayanan (Mammootty) who migrated to the Middle-East in the early 1960s when the Kerala Gulf boom was just beginning.

Principal photography began in October 2014. The film was shot in Kerala and the Middle East. Distributed by Eros International, Pathemari was released on 9 October 2015 and received critical praise. Pathemari was selected for the Indiwood Panorama Competition section at the 2nd edition of Indiwood Carnival 2016 in Hyderabad.

== Plot ==
In the 1960s, a young Palikkal Narayanan and his friend Moideen embark on a perilious sea journey to Dubai aboard a dhow, smuggled by Launchi Velayudhan in pursuit of financial stability. Upon arriving in Gulf, Narayanan and Moideen secure work as heavy construction labourers, living in cramped labour camps and enduring harsh conditions while sending their hard-earned income back to their families in Kerala.

During a vacation home, Narayanan announces his intention to quit Gulf job and settle down in Kerala with a local business. However, he quickly realises that his family treats him merely as a source of revenue, and his wife, Nalini, fears losing her social stature if he stays. Disillusioned, Narayanan returns to Dubai to continue working. Meanwhile, Narayanan's elder brother, Chandran, proposes a dowry deal to facilitate the marriage of their orphaned niece Smitha: Narayanan must transfer his house to the niece, assuming Narayanan can easily afford to build a new house. Generously, Narayanan agrees.

Post-marriage, Chandran informs Narayanan that the new groom wants to rent out the house for income. Upset and unwilling to displace his own wife and children living there, Narayanan quietly agrees to pay monthly rent to his niece's husband for his own home.

Decades pass, and Narayanan grows old while his adult children care only for his wealth and remitted money rather than his well-being. Eventually, Narayanan dies in Dubai, and his remains are flown back to Kerala. Even during his funeral, his family displays little genuine grief, focusing instead on financial matters.

Following the final rites, the family watches a pre-recorded television interview featuring Narayanan. In the broadcast, Narayanan reflects on his life without bitterness, expressing immense pride in having lifted his family out of poverty. He reveals that he deliberately hid his gruelling hardships so they could live comfortably, finding complete fulfillment in providing for them despite their lack of concern for him. He concludes by wishing to be reborn into the exact same family and circle of friends so he can bring them happiness all over again.

== Cast ==
- Mammootty as Pallikkal Narayanan
  - Rohit Menon as young Narayanan
- Sreenivasan as Moideen
  - Stevin Kagoo as young Moideen
- Jewel Mary as Nalini, Narayanan's wife
- Siddique as Launchi Velayudhan
- Joy Mathew as Chandran, Narayanan's elder brother
- Viji Chandrasekhar as Narayanan's mother
- Jennifer Antony as Girija
- Anju Aravind as Pushpa
- Gokulan as Narayanan's relative
- Kalabhavan Haneef as Marriage broker
- Anu Joseph as Nirmala
- Santhosh Keezhattoor as Majeed
- Salim Kumar as Govindan, Narayanan's father
- Sruthi Lakshmi as Smitha, Nirmala's daughter
- Dinesh Prabhakar as Sudhakaran
- Saju Navodaya as Narayanan's roommate
- Mithun Ramesh as Najeeb, Moideen's son
- Shaheen Siddique as Satheeshan, Narayanan's elder son
- Aakash Santhosh as Narayanan's younger son
- Sunil Sukhada as Lonappan
- Nyla Usha as herself (cameo appearance)

== Production ==
=== Development ===
In November 2013, Salim Ahamed announced that he would be directing a film that deals with the Gulf and various aspects of it and that it will star Mammootty in the lead, in his second collaboration with Ahmed after Kunjananthante Kada (2013). Madhu Ambat was reported to handle the cinematography with the sound recording done by Resul Pookutty. It was in 2013 that Ahamed narrated the story to Mammootty. He expressed interest, and the total screenplay was finished in a span of one year. Salim said he chose Mammootty for the role of Narayanan because he could portray the three stages of life of the protagonist. “I did not model Narayanan on any one individual but on a few workers like him in the Gulf,” he said.

=== Casting ===
In September 2014, Jewel Mary a television anchor was cast as the heroine, in her feature film debut as Nalini, while Mammootty's character was revealed to be named Pallickal Narayanan. Sreenivasan was also confirmed to play the role of Moidheen, while Siddique, Salim Kumar, Joy Mathew, and Yavanika Gopalakrishnan were signed for other prominent roles. Actress Viji Chandrasekhar was confirmed to play the protagonist's mother. Shaheen Siddique was selected to play Mammootty's son. Salim Ahamed had earlier denied the rumours that Suresh Gopi and Manju Warrier would be part of the cast.

=== Filming and post-production ===
Principal photography of the film commenced in October 2014 and was completed by April 2015, in three schedules in and around Khorfakhan, Fujaira, Dubai, Chettuva, Nattika, Thriprayar, and Bepur. In the third week of March, Mammootty joined the crew for a five-day schedule of filming in the UAE, which was mainly held in Bur Dubai, Jumeirah, and Rola Square in Sharjah. Jothish Shankar designed the art for the film, collaborating with the director for the third time. Ninety percent of the scenes in Pathemari are sets, according to Jyothish. The set for Mumbai Airport of 1980 was erected at the parking area of Greater Cochin Development Authority Building in Marine Drive, Kochi. Every scene taking place abroad except the outdoors was shot in Ernakulam. The Khader Hotel where the expatriates were used to lend food was also erected at a studio in Kochi. The house was erected at Thriprayar. The scenes in the sloop were shot adopting a water-craft from Beypore.

It was during the shoot of Kunjananthante Kada that Resul Pookutty, the Academy Award winning sound designer, was roped in the project by Salim Ahamed. For the film, sounds of air conditioners, traffic and its changing over time in the Gulf were used by Resul in order to portray the development and transformation of the surroundings. He says that he did the sound design in the same as the images are arranged in the film; that "the past is represented colourfully and the present is monochromatic." Real sounds were used for the scene in which the protagonist's first voyage aboard a sloop is featured. Resul used the 'gurgling sound of water' in the background for the scene, which, he says, the director had said "was spot on as it conveyed the loneliness and entrapment of the voyagers beautifully." It was only three changes that the director needed to suggest to Resul in the final track of the sounds designed for the film.

== Marketing ==
The production team released a making video of the film which features the creation of the 'storm' that appeared in a prominent scene in the film, where a group of youngsters are migrating illegally to the Middle East by crossing the sea on a sloop and are facing severe difficulties. The video, also featuring the VFX used for the scene, was uploaded by Mammootty on his official Facebook page on 27 October, which IB Times said "has gone viral, with more than 51,000 social media users watching it at the time of reporting." In an event organised by World Malayali Council, some emigrants who have gone to Gulf during the 1960s period aboard the dhows were honoured by the makers of the film.

== Soundtrack ==
Pathemari

Soundtrack album Pathemari by Bijibal
- Released: 14 September 2015
- Genre: Film soundtrack
- Language: Malayalam
- Label: Eros Music
- Producer: Bijibal

Bijibal chronology
My God (2015)	Pathemari (2015)	Rani padmini (2015)

All lyrics are written by Rafeeq Ahamed; all music is composed by Bijibal.

No.	Title	Artist(s)	Length
1.	"Padiyirangunnu"	Hariharan	3:40
2.	"Pathemari"	Shahabaz Aman	4:11
3.	"Ithu Paro Swargamo"	Jyotsna Radhakrishnan	3:11

The music was released by Eros Music on 14 September 2015. 15 Gulf expatriates from Kerala during the Gulf boom were specially invited for the audio launch.

On 18 September, the first video song Padiyirangunnu was released. The Hindu included the song Padiyirangunnu in their weekend top-five and commented: "Bijibal makes the phenomenally appropriate decision to rope in Hariharan to sing this incredibly soulful melody. It seems — given it evokes strong memories of Karnan's Ullathil Nalla Ullam — to be set to Chakravakam raga. The result is sheer magic since the mellow tune goes really well with Hariharan's deep, sonorous voice."

== Release ==
After several postponements, on 9 October 2015, the film was released in 64 centers in Kerala. The distribution rights were acquired by Eros International, marking their second venture in Malayalam after Life of Josutty. The film's premiere in Qatar was held at an event organised by Qubis Events in Doha, during which Malayali emigrants who have been in Qatar for decades were honoured. As part of the 100 days celebration, Pathemari was re-released in more than 10 theatres in Kerala on 8 January. The distribution rights of Pathemari were brought by Surya TV.

=== Plagiarism allegations ===
A UAE-based NRI, Moidutty, filed a complaint in the Additional Sessions Court, Eranakulam, against the release of the film, stating that the director Salim Ahmed plagiarised his story titled 'Swapnageham'. In July 2015, the release of the film was stayed by the Ernakulam Additional Sessions Court. Salim Ahamed reacted to the allegation saying "It is said to be that about three people have come up with similar claims, one from Irikkur, Kannur, and another one who has conducted a press conference about it in Muscat." The director also pointed out that his debut film Adaminte Makan Abu had also faced similar allegations, but it died down when the movie was released. "Pathemari will be felt for each NRI Malayalis as their own story, but it is not about a single individual. We will try to solve the plagiarism issue legally," said Salim. Later in an interview, Salim Ahamed furthermore clarified the issue and said, "Upon reading the story for clarification, I could see that the accuser's own work is a plagiarized tale based on the story titled Swapnangalil Ninnu Swapnangalilekku Oru Kabir, written by T V Kochubava, decades ago. As we pointed it out, the court happened to check it and the observation was included in the final verdict, which was in our favour. We are continuing with the case as false allegations were made."

== Reception ==
The film received positive reviews. It was reported that it was among the five films shortlisted for India's submission for the Academy Award for Best Foreign Language Film, by the jury headed by Amol Palekar. Citing film director and jury member K. Madhu, Malayala Manorama reported that the film missed the submission to the Marathi film Court in the final round. However, Salim Ahamed talked about the news in an interview with The Times of India that, "I am a filmmaker who makes movies for the Malayali audience and tell stories of their lives, and those outside its realm aren't my focus group. Being considered for Oscars is good enough."

On 12 October, it was reported that the film had been selected to be screened under the category of 'Malayalam Cinema Today' at the 20th edition of International Film Festival of Kerala, which was held at Thiruvananthapuram in December 2015. In 2019, Saraswathy Nagarajan of The Hindu ranked Pathemari amongst the best Malayalam films of 2015.

=== Critical reception ===
Sujatha S of Mathrubhumi called the film "An ode to Gulf Malayali" and appreciated the cinematography, editing, and sound mixing by Resul Pookutty. She said, "The dialogues on many occasions in the first half sound dramatic, though there were gems of dialogues too". Rating 4 out of 5, Anu James of International Business Times called the performance of Mammootty as one of his career-best and wrote: "As it is a familiar story for many of us, there is no suspense element in it, but we still sit firmly on our seats just to see what happens next." S.R. Praveen of The Hindu wrote "A familiar story, a familiar setting and even actors in predictable roles – on paper, there is nothing really going for Pathemari . But still much can be achieved with a script that shines light on previously unseen details." Rejath RG of Kerala Kaumudi also said, "Salim Ahmed excels as the writer and director in Pathemari and considering the fact that it was such a memorable experience." Behindwoods rated 3/5 and stated, "As far as the narration goes, the film takes you through familiar territory, like what we have seen in films like Arabikkatha, but let's just say that Pathemari is highly laced with empathy. At the end of the film, you can't help feel empathetic about the suffering and chronic homesickness that every Gulf Malayali or any expatriate would be going through for that matter." Paresh C. Palicha writing for Rediff.com gave 5/5 and wrote, "The director tries to infuse new life to the dated theme by employing flashbacks and flash forwards, bringing in a larger social perspective rather than restricting it to one person." Rating 3/5, entertainment portal Indiaglitz described the technical aspects as "pretty okay" saying "A more realistic dialogues and novelty factor would have lifted the movie to a new level" and concluded, "The way the movie ends is also quite nice and this adds to the overall good."

Praising performances, cinematography, and music, G. Ragesh of Malayala Manorama rated the film 3.25/5 and said, "Through episodes that the viewers can easily associate with, Salim tells the tale of the Malayali migrant life in a less dramatic but compelling narrative. The film doesn't have the flavours for a commercial flick. Nor does it compromise anywhere to satiate the tastes of the so-called critics. In short, it's a film made for all." Sanjith Sidhardhan of The Times of India gave the film a rating of 3.5/5 and wrote, "Salim Ahamed's film may have a familiar plot but it's so honestly told that a viewer empathizes with Narayanan's character, who is torn between his wishes and those of his family. Pathemari is a tale of sacrifice – a seemingly never-ending one for a Gulf Malayali in the 80s." He also praised Mammootty's and Siddique's performances, writing, "Pathemari has Mammootty proving why he is a genius when it comes to evoking empathy from the viewers with his masterful performance. Jewel Mary, Sreenivasan, Joy Mathew and Shaheen Siddique play their parts well but it is Siddique as Lanchi Velayudhan who steals the show despite his limited screen time." A critic from entertainment portal Sify gave the film a "watchable" verdict and gave a mixed review, writing, "There are some terrific moments that come at times for sure, but one gets a feeling that the narration becomes too superficial. In fact, nothing much is being offered to the viewer that we haven't heard before in those stories about the Gulf Malayalis. If we have come across similar stories as sub-plots in earlier films, here it becomes a 110-minute-long film." However, they singled out Mammootty for praise writing, "In one of his most hard-hitting performances during recent times, it is Mammootty who carries the story ahead with amazing honesty. It is a treat to watch the hero, who portrays the character in a dedicated manner.

=== Box office ===
The film was a commercial success. Pathemari had a lukewarm opening. In a press conference, Salim Ahamed said that the film had opened with just five or six viewers in some theatres for the first show. It collected ₹50 lakh (US$52,000) on its opening day. In 15 days, the film collected approximately ₹7.10 crore (US$740,000), and in 28 days, it had collected ₹8.6 crore (US$890,000) from India. On 31 October 2015, Ahamed, in a press conference said that he did not expect the film to be "a success like this" and said that "I did not try to deliberately add to Pathemari any element that is required by our commercial cinema. I think the film is accepted by people because they could relate to their relatives or friends who have worked in the Gulf countries." The film completed 125 days in theatres across Kerala, it crossed four weeks in 60 screens in the United Arab Emirates, and completed five weekends in the United States of America by grossing ₹18.04 lakhs in its final run.

== Accolades ==
National Film Awards

- Best Feature Film in Malayalam (2015)

Asiavision Awards

- Best Movie on Social Welfare
- Best Critically Acclaimed Movie
- Best New Face – Jewel Mary
- Best Music Director – Bijibal

Ramu Kariat Film Awards

- Best Film
- Best Direction – Salim Ahamed
- Best Screenplay – Salim Ahamed
- Best Actor – Mammootty
- Best Sound Design – Resul Pookutty
- Best Cinematography – Madhu Ambat
- Best Supporting Actor – Siddique
- Best New Face (male) -Shaheen Siddique
- Best New Face (female) – Jewel Mary
- Best Film Editor – Vijay Shankar
- Best Art Director – Jyothish Shankar
- Best Costume Design – Sameera Saneesh
- Best Makeup – Pattanam Rasheed

Flowers Indian Film Awards

- Best Film
- Best Direction – Salim Ahamed
- Best Screenplay – Salim Ahamed
- Best Actor – Mammootty
- Best Sound Design – Resul Pookutty

Filmfare Awards

- Best Film
- Best Actor - Mammootty
