= RJ Shaan =

Indian writer and VJ

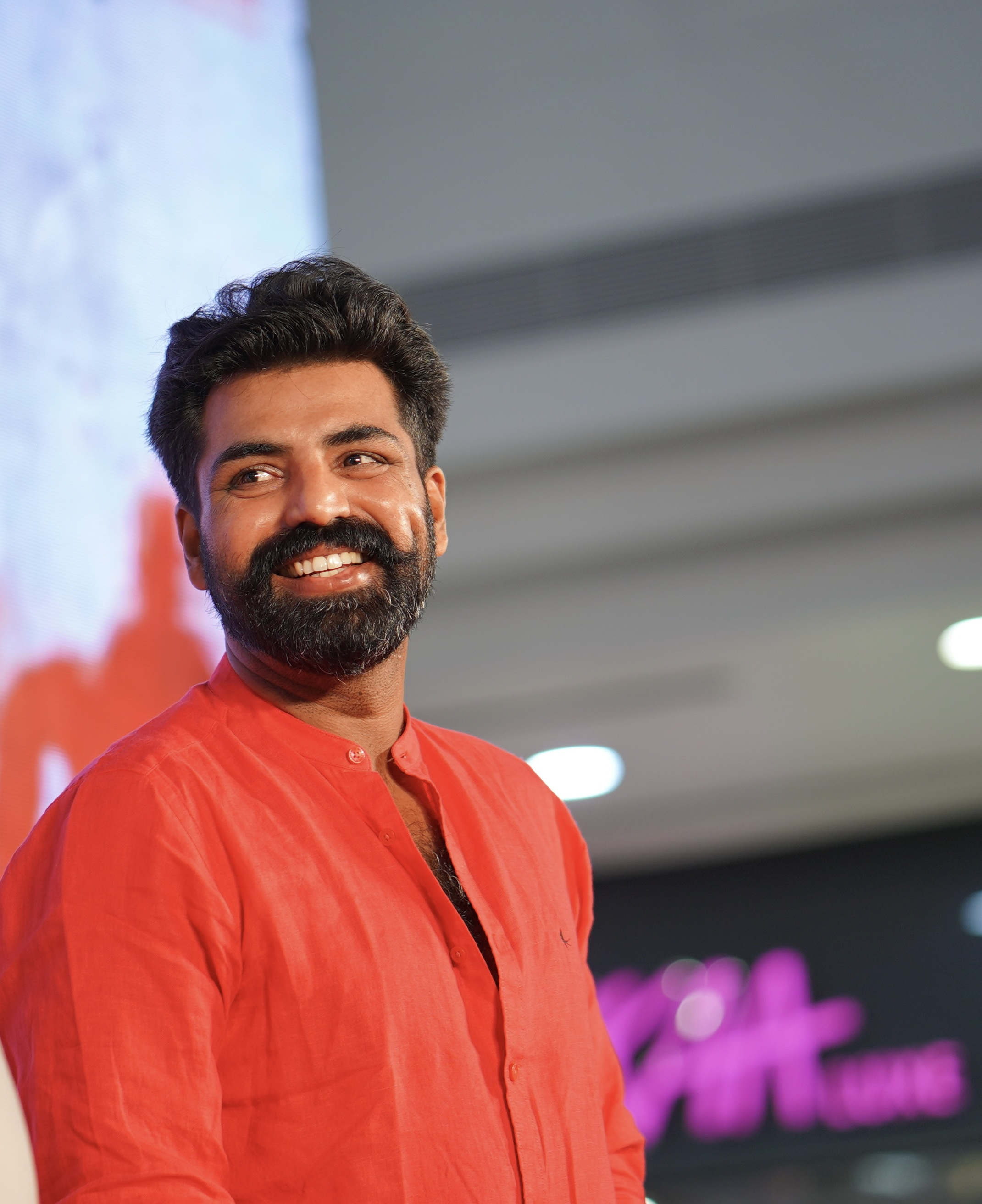
- Born: 17 February 1986 (age 39); Kerala, India
- Other names: Prasanth P Menon
- Occupation(s): Screenwriter, Film Maker, Radio Jockey
- Years active: 2004–present

Prasanth P Menon, better known as RJ Shaan is an Indian director and scriptwriter who predominantly works in Malayalam cinema. He is one of the first radio jockeys from the Kerala FM Radio Industry to attain a celebrity status among the public. Known for his shows 919 Spotlight, star Jam, Kalakkan Recharge etc he made his debut in Malayalam film as a screenwriter in 2017 with Manju Warrier starrer C/O Saira Banu. He scripted the Suresh Gopi starrer Paappan and made his debut as a film maker through the short film Freedom at Midnight starring Anupama Parameswaran which was recognized by Youtube India and won several awards.

== Career ==
=== Radio career ===
Shaan has an extremely successful & long radio journey of over 15 years and gained popularity in both regions - Kerala and the UAE. He started his career in 2004 with Radio Asia 947 FM in the UAE and then moved to Kerala's First FM Radio Network Radio Mango from the Malayala Manorama Group in Kerala in 2007. He was the first Radio Celebrity interviewer with a trend-setting show 919 Spotlight and also the first RJ to win the Indian Radio Forum Award in the Malayalam Category. Later, he became the Brand Creative Head for CLUB FM, Mathrubhumi and was known for his daily morning show Kalakkan Recharge and interview Series Star Jam, which again won several accolades and recognition.

In 2015, he moved back to the UAE and joined Gold FM. His Audio tribute during the Chennai Floods went globally viral and was appreciated highly. In 2016, he was part of launching CLUB FM in the UAE, as Brand Creative Head and RJ and was very known for the UAE Edition of Kalakkan Recharge, which also bagged the most prestigious New York Radio Forum Awards. He has also hosted several award functions like SIIMA, Asia vision Awards, CCL ground shows, Reality shows & other television & stage shows.

=== Film career ===
Shaan started his career as an assistant to Director Rosshan Andrrews in Manju Warrier's comeback movie How Old Are You?. He marked his debut as a scriptwriter with C/O Saira Banu in 2017. His Directorial Debut was the Short film Freedom at midnight starring Anupama Parameswaran. YouTube India recognized ‘Freedom at Midnight’ as a masterpiece and appreciated the craft for its achievements. In 2022, he will be marking his second feature film as a scriptwriter for the Suresh Gopi film Paappan which will be directed by Joshiy

== Personal life ==
RJ Shaan was born on (February 17, 1986) to Prabhadas Menon and Geetha Menon. He hails from Chitoor, Palakkad, and did his schooling at Chinmaya Vidyalaya, Pallavur . While pursuing his Bachelors in Fashion Designing from K.L.E. Society's S. Nijalingappa College in Bangalore, he started his career as a full-time Radio Jockey and discontinued his education.

== Filmography ==
=== Films ===
Year	Title	Role	Director	Notes
2013	ABCD: American-Born Confused Desi	Actor	Martin Prakkat	Cameo Appearance as himself
2014	Vaayai Moodi Pesavum	Actor	Balaji Mohan	Cameo Appearance as himself
2014	How Old Are You?	Assistant Director	Roshan Andrews	
2017	C/O Saira Banu	Script Writer	Antony Sony Sebastian	Debut as Script Writer
2022	Paappan	Script Writer	Joshiy	
2023	Antony	Creative Director	Joshiy	
2026	Untitled Manju Warrier Project	Director	Himself	Debut Directorial

=== Short films ===
Year	Title	Role	Director	Notes
2014	Murugan	Actor	Shanoob	
2015	Moonaamidam	Script Writer & Actor	Antony Sony	Produced by Jayasurya
2015	Ranganaayaki (Tamil)	Actor	Mohith Nath	
2021	Freedom at Midnight	Director	Himself	Lead by Anupama Parameswaran
