= Paappan =

2022 Indian film directed by Joshiy

- Theatrical release poster
- Directed by: Joshiy
- Written by: RJ Shaan
- Produced by: Gokulam Gopalan; David Kachappilly; Raaffi Mathirra
- Starring: Suresh Gopi; Gokul Suresh; Neeta Pillai
- Cinematography: Ajay David Kachappilly
- Edited by: Shyam Sasidharan
- Music by: Jakes Bejoy
- Production companies: Sree Gokulam Movies; David Kachappilly Productions; Iffaar Media
- Distributed by: Dream Big Films (India); Phars Films (GCC)
- Release date: 29 July 2022
- Running time: 170 minutes
- Country: India
- Language: Malayalam
- Box office: est. ₹50 crore

Paappan (transl. Dad) is a 2022 Indian Malayalam-language crime thriller film directed by Joshiy and written by RJ Shaan. The film was jointly produced by Gokulam Gopalan, David Kachappilly and Raaffi Mathirra. It stars father and son, Suresh Gopi and Gokul Suresh, alongside Neeta Pillai, Asha Sharath, Nyla Usha, Kaniha, and Ajmal Ameer in supporting roles.

Paappan was released on 29 July 2022. The film received mixed to positive reviews from critics and has emerged as a commercial success. The film made its digital premiere on 7 September 2022 on ZEE5.

== Plot ==
The corpse of Superstar Ravi Varman is found in Pulimala forest. The Kerala Police headed by ASP Vincy Abraham investigate. She suspects Ravi's driver Bullet Rajan, after they discover Rajan's criminal history, his case was investigated by Vincy's estranged father former CI Abraham Mathew "Mathan" alias Paappan. Inspecting the corpse, the cops discover it was Rajan, who was murdered, whilst Ravi is missing. During the postmortem, Vincy learns that Rajan was killed in a way to resemble a heart attack, she also learns there were female prints, along with Ravi's and Rajan's, in Ravi's car. Learning Ravi is shooting a film, Vincy's team interviews him, and Ravi reveals he was having an affair with actress Hiranmayi.

Rajan had dropped them at his farmhouse and left to meet someone in Pulimala. He was shocked to learn of his death from the news. Vincy's team find a riddle 26 (written on Rajan's toes) and a double-edged dagger named Bull's eye dagger, they conclude that a recently-released-from-prison criminal named Iruttan Chacko is the killer.

It is revealed that Paappan was dismissed from service several years earlier for trying to fabricate evidence to ensure that Chacko is sentenced to capital punishment. However, Paappan is held in high regard by the police officers who used to be his colleagues. SP Bhaskar Shenoy appoints Paappan unofficially to investigate the case with Vincy. The next morning, CI Soman's corpse is found in Trivandrum. Vincy learns that Soman was killed the same way as Rajan and had the number 8 written on him. It is revealed that Chacko was a serial killer whom Paappan was after during his service, and Chacko had accidentally killed Paappan's wife Nancy, when she tried to save Paappan from being killed by Chacko. The infamous dagger which was being used by Chacko to kill all his victims, gets lost in the hussle, and to overcome this technical hurdle and ensure that Chacko is hanged, Paappan fabricated a dagger. But Paappan's ploy was discovered in the trial court, and the court ordered him to be dismissed from service. Chacko was imprisoned for various other offences, but escaped conviction and capital punishment for many of his murders due to the absence of original dagger as evidence.

One night, a stranger sneaks into forensic doctor Sherly Somasundaram's house. Sherly informs Vincy, who assumes the stranger is Chacko and tries to catch him, to no avail. Vincy receives footage of Paappan meeting Chacko in prison and with the help of an analyser, she learns Paappan had planned to meet Chacko after he got released. Vincy suspects Paappan of having Chacko hired as the killer. While checking people who met Chacko, Vincy learns that a woman, Aisha Fathima, came to visit Chacko. In investigation, it is revealed that Aisha Fathima was a fake name and the woman was actually a nun who works at the orphanage which takes care of Chacko's mother Kunjamma. Vincy finds Chacko's location by tapping his phone call to Kunjamma. However, at his address, Vincy finds Chacko chained-up and concludes someone else is behind the killings.

Paappan feels the real killer is trying to communicate something to the police, and in order to make the killer say it out loud, advises Bhaskar to hold a press meet and falsely announce that Chacko is the killer. Bhaskar holds a press meeting and falsely closes the case in order to lure the real killer. Subsequently, Vincy's husband Siddharth receives a package containing an invitation to attend a meet-the-author ceremony of a book 'Rahasya-the killer has a past'. The package also contained the book titled Rahasya-the killer has a past with pages 95 and 96 torn, which leads them to suspect the numbers when read together could be a date 26-8-95/96. They spy on the book's author Dr. Priya Nalini akaDraupadi, at the ceremony. However, they learn that Priya's husband Adv. Jayashankar was the killer's target and he is killed in a car explosion while the ceremony is taking place. Meanwhile, it is shown that Paappan is in search of some evidence by using an old school photo taken at a school in Pulimala with the help of his son Michael. Paappan and Michael learn about Simon, who was accused of absconding after stealing a golden cross from the church of Pulimala. He learns that Simon and his upper-caste classmate Bennitta Issac Puthenpuraykal were in love, but her family learnt this and fixed Bennita's marriage to someone else on 26 August 1996. Paappan finds it odd that Simon and the golden cross goes missing on the eve of Bennitta's fixed marriage. He also learns from the church records that Bennitta's marriage got cancelled due to some undisclosed reason.

Bennitta's family members; her father Issac, mother Kathrina, brother Fr. Bennett had died mysteriously. Using age progression technology, Paappan scans Bennitta's photo and finds that Sherly is Bennitta, and kidnaps her with Michael's help. It was Michael who had sneaked into Sherly's house and recovered an old school photo from Pulimala school in Sherly's album. Paappan had directed Michael to spy on her because he was suspicious about her from the beginning. Paappan reveals the findings to Bhaskar and Vincy, where Vincy learns that Jayashankar, Soman and Bennitta's brother Fr. Bennet were college friends. Paappan interrogates Bennitta and learns that Simon was brutally murdered by her family, Rajan, Jayashankar, Soman and Fr. Bennet in an honour killing incident. Bennitta had to helplessly watch Simon being killed, burnt to death and later blamed for stealing the cross and running away.

Bennitta vowed vengeance and had secretly killed her family members. As Sherly was making this confession to Paappan, Vincy also received Jayashankar's confession about the honour killing. Sherly says that she plotted this whole thing for the world to discover the truth about Simon's death. Paappan and Bhaskar find Simon's skeletal remains and the lost golden cross of the Pulimala church near the place where Rajan's body had been found in the beginning. Simon's innocence is proven before all, and Sherly comments her job is over and that she may be arrested. But Paappan reveals that there is more to the story as Simon's younger brother Solomon was also involved with Bennitta, as is evident from old airplane details showing that Solomon accompanied Bennitta to the UK years ago. Simultaneously, he receives a call from Solomon, who had kidnapped Vincy, who had gone in search of Adv.Jayashankar's body. Paappan meets Solomon at the Pulimala church and it is revealed that Paappan was also present in the vicinity on the same fateful night where Simon's death occurred. A young Solomon, aware of Paappan's identity as a police officer, had rushed to his place of stay and begged him to accompany him to save his elder brother who was going to be killed. But the 5-year old Vincy had met with an electric shock at the same time and was in a critical stage and Paappan had painfully chosen to save his daughter's life by taking her to hospital instead of going with Solomon to save his brother's life. From that day, Solomon has been holding a grudge against Paappan because he failed in his duty as police officer, he failed to protect his brother despite being informed of the matter. The punishment he has decided for Paappan is to have his same fate- look on as his own blood is burning to death. Solomon locks Vincy in a coffin and puts it in the electric crematorium in the church cemetery and sets it alight. In a fight, Paappan manages to open the machine and save Vincy but Michael who intervenes to help, is held at gunpoint by Solomon. Left with no other choice, Paappan kills Solomon with Chacko's double headed dagger and saves his children from all future dangers from Solomon. Paappan surrenders for killing Solomon. Three years later, Paappan is released from prison and reunites with Vincy and his family.

== Cast ==
- Suresh Gopi as Former Ranny Police Station Ex- CI Abraham Mathew Mathan/Paappan
- Neeta Pillai as Pathanamthitta ASP Vincy Abraham IPS, Paappan's Daughter (voiceover by Riya Saira)
  - Baby Kanmani as Younger Vincy
- Gokul Suresh as Michael, Paappan's adopted son
- Vijayaraghavan as Pathanamthitta SP Bhaskar Shenoy IPS
- Asha Sharath as forensic Dr. Sherly Somasundaram / Bennitta Issac John Puthenpuraykal, The Main Antagonist - 1
  - Manasa Radhakrishnan as Younger Bennitta (Kunjumol)
- Nyla Usha as Nancy Abraham, Paappan's wife and Vincy's mother
- Kaniha as Sussan, Michael's mother (voiceover by Vimmy Mariam George)
- Chandunath as Sidharth Nath /Sidharthan /Sidhan, Vincy's husband and Paappan's son-in-law
- Ajmal Ameer in a dual role as
  - Simon, Bennitta's love interest
  - Solomon, Simon's Younger Brother And The Serial Killer
- Janardhanan as Dr. Pattabhiraman, Rtd. Forensic Surgeon
- Sajitha Madathil as Kathrina Puthenpuraykal, Bennitta's mother
- Nandu as ASI Raghavan
- Tini Tom as CI Soman Nair
- Shammi Thilakan as Iruttan Chacko
- Abhishek Raveendran as SI Sabu
- Dayyana Hameed as Rituparna
- Sadhika Venugopal as constable Girija
- Baiju Jose as Forensic Officer Dr. Nandan
- Sreejith Ravi as "Bullet" Rajan, Driver Of Actor Ravi Varman
- Rahul Madhav as super star Ravi Varman aka Raviji
- Meenakshi Dinesh as Actress Hiranmayi
- Jewel Mary as Writer Dr. Priya Nalini / Draupadi (cameo)
- Malavika Menon as Sister Anitha / Aisha Fathima
- Rosin Jolly as Ravi's wife
- Parvathi T. as Dr. Radhika Menon
- Preetha Pradeep as Police officer's wife
- Chali Pala as ASI Sathyanath
- Nirmal Palazhi as Issac John Puthenpuraykal, Bennitta's father
- Srikanth Murali as Police Forensic Surgeon Dr Ammer
- Madan Mohan as Benett Issac, Bennitta's elder brother
- Benzi Mathews as Advocate Jayashankar, Priya Nalini's husband
- Nandhu Pothuval as Pothuval, Ravi Varman's manager
- Kottayam Ramesh as Judge
- Sinoj Varghese as Paulose
- Savithri Sreedharan as Kunjamma, Chacko's mother
- Sanuja Somanath as Forensic Assistant Dr. Anupama
- Saniya Babu as Nithya
- Laya Simpson as Mariyam
- Jordi Poonjar
- Sundarapandiyan as police officer
- George Abraham as CI Rajashekhar

== Production ==
On 14 February 2021, Suresh Gopi announced that he will be teaming up with director Joshiy for his 252nd venture. Writer RJ Shaan, cinematographer Ajay David Kachappilly and composer Jakes Bejoy were also reported to be part of the film. The official title Paappan was announced with a poster on the following day. According to the writer, it is a family-oriented film.

Nyla Usha was reported to play the female lead. Sunny Wayne, Neeta Pillai, Gokul Suresh, Kaniha and Asha Sharath were also signed to be part of the film. The film marks the first time on-screen collaboration of Suresh and son Gokul. The cast additions included Chandhunadh, Vijayaraghavan, Tini Tom and Shammi Thilakan. Jewel Mary was reported to make a cameo appearance in the film. Actress Dayyana Hameed confirmed her inclusion in the film, stating that she will play the role of a contemporary dancer. Kaniha plays Suresh Gopi's character's sister in the film.

Principal photography began on 5 March 2021 in Kanjirappally. The same day, Suresh Gopi shared an image of his character with a salt and pepper look. On 10 March 2021, Suresh was hospitalized after being infected with pneumonia while shooting. On his discharge, he was asked to contest as the NDA candidate in the 2021 Kerala Legislative Assembly election from Thrissur and began campaigning. He rejoined the sets of the film post elections.

== Release ==
Paappan was released on 29 July 2022.

=== Box office ===
Paapan took a worldwide opening of ₹4 crores with ₹3.5 crores and ₹11 crores on the first weekend in Kerala and ₹14 crore worldwide. The film grossed over ₹35 crores from the Indian box office and collected ₹50 crore worldwide in 20 days.

== See also ==
- List of Malayalam films of 2022
