= Minute to Win It (Indian game show) =

Indian game show

- Genre: Game show
- Based on: Minute to Win It
- Presented by: Nyla Usha
- Country of origin: India
- Original language: Malayalam
- No. of seasons: 1
- No. of episodes: 80

Production
- Running time: 55 Minutes approx.

Original release
- Network: Mazhavil Manorama
- Release: 9 April 2016 – 3 February 2017

Minute to Win It is a Malayalam-language Indian game show which premiered on Mazhavil Manorama channel and is hosted by RJ Nyla Usha. The show is based on a US television game show on the same title, Minute to Win It. The show already telecast in Tamil, Kannada and English across India. Mazhavil Manorama is the first Malayalam-language channel to adopt the International television show to its channel. This game show had succeeded in more than 60 countries.

== Format ==
In the game show, the contestant is needed to complete a certain level with 60-seconds time period and need to complete each and every levels to reach the Top of Money Tree with Three Lives. The top cash prize is ₹10 lakh (equivalent to ₹14 lakh or US$15,000 in 2023).

== Celebrity contestants ==
- Thatteem Mutteem team
- Sanusha & Sanoop Santhosh
- Kavi Uddheshichathu..? team
- Malavika Wales & Rahul Ravi
- D 4 Dance team

== Awards ==
- Best Anchor - Nyla Usha at FLOWERS TV AWARDS 2017
