= Nyla Usha =

Indian actress

- Born: Nyla Usha Gopakumar; Thiruvananthapuram, Kerala, India
- Occupations: Film actress; radio jockey; model; TV host
- Years active: 2004–present

Nyla Usha Gopakumar is an Indian actress, television host, and radio jockey from Thiruvananthapuram, Kerala. After working for nearly a decade as an RJ at Hit 96.7 in Dubai, she made her acting debut in 2013 with Kunjananthante Kada.

== Early life and education ==
Nyla was born to Gopakumar and Usha Kumari in Thiruvananthapuram, Kerala. She did her schooling at the Holy Angels' Convent, Thiruvananthapuram, and pursued her college education at the All Saints College, Thiruvananthapuram. In 2004, she moved to Dubai and joined the radio station Hit 96.7 where she continues to work as a radio jockey.

== Career ==
=== 2013–2015: Debut and success ===
In 2013, Nyla Usha debuted in the Malayalam film industry with Salim Ahamed's Kunjananthante Kada, opposite Mammootty. Ahamed had known Nyla since she had interviewed him on several occasions in Dubai and offered her the lead female role. She played Chithira, a woman who is going through an unhappy marriage.

Later that year she had her second release, Punyalan Agarbattis, in which she played "a vibrant girl, similar to the real me". Since she could relate herself to the character, she used her own looks and costumes in the film. Although she had a major role in Kunjananthante Kada she said that it was her role in Punyalan Agarbathis that fetched her recognition. She played the female lead in Aashiq Abu's 2014 crime film Gangster and Deepu Karunakaran's 2015 thriller Fireman.

=== 2016–present: Experimental roles and success ===
From 2016 to 2017, she hosted the Malayalam version of Minute to Win It in Mazhavil Manorama. She essayed the role of Effymol in Diwanjimoola Grand Prix in 2018.

In 2019, she had two releases, Prithviraj Sukumaran-directed action drama Lucifer, in which she played a TV channel executive, and Joshiy-directed action drama Porinju Mariam Jose, in which she played Mariam, one of the three title characters.

== Filmography ==
Key
†	Denotes films that have not yet been released

=== Films ===
Year	Title	Role	Notes	Ref
2013	Kunjananthante Kada	Chithira	Debut film	
2013	Punyalan Agarbattis	Anu		
2014	Gangster	Sana Ibrahim		
2015	Fireman	Sherin Thomas IPS		
2015	Pathemari	Herself as RJ	Cameo appearance	
2016	Pretham	Maya	Cameo appearance	
2018	Diwanjimoola Grand Prix	Effymol		
2019	Lucifer	Arundhathi Sajeev		
2019	Porinju Mariam Jose	Alappattu Mariyam Varghese		
2022	Priyan Ottathilanu	Priscilla		
2022	Paappan	Nancy Abraham		
2023	Kunjamminis Hospital	Riny Titus		
2023	King of Kotha	Manju		
2023	Antony	Maya		
2025	L2: Empuraan	Arundhathi Sanjeev		

=== Television ===
Year	Show	Role	Channel
2021	Colors Food Trial	Host	Colors TV
2020	Snehathode Veetil Ninnu	Host	Mazhavil Manorama
2016–2017	Minute To Win It	Host	Mazhavil Manorama
2016–2017	Global Greetings	Host	Asianet
2023–2024	The Next Top Anchor	Judge	ManoramaMAX; Mazhavil Manorama

== Awards ==
Year	Work	Category	Result	Ref.
Masala Awards
2012	Radio Presenter	Best Radio Presenter	Won	
Asiavision Awards
2013	Kunjananthante Kada	Best Debut Actress	Won	
Flowers TV Awards
2017	Minute to Win It	Best Anchor	Won	
Ramu Karyat Awards
2020	Porinju Mariam Jose	Best Actress	Won	
Vanitha Film Awards
2020	Porinju Mariam Jose	Best Character Actress	Won	
