= Salim Ahamed =

Indian film director, screenwriter and producer

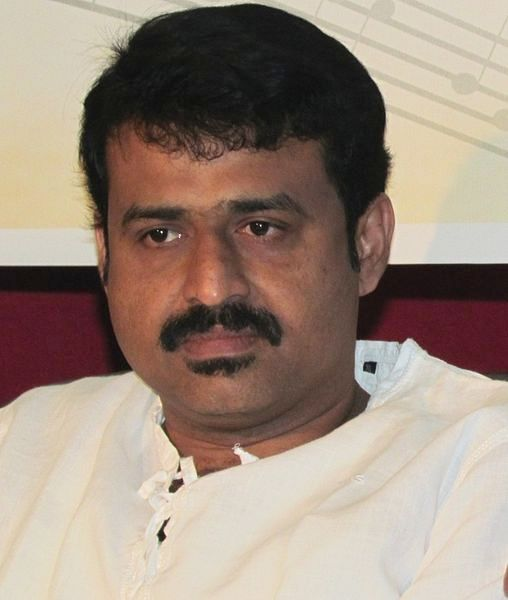
- Salim Ahamed
- Born: T. P. Salim Ahamed; 6 July 1971 (age 55); Mattannur, Kerala, India
- Occupations: Film director; screenwriter; film producer
- Years active: 2011–present
- Spouse: Mafeedha
- Children: 3
- Awards: See Awards

Salim Ahamed (born 6 July 1971) is an Indian film director, screen writer and producer. After working for a long time as a travel consultant, he joined as a creative director and script writer in a television channel. His directorial debut, Adaminte Makan Abu (2011), fetched him numerous accolades and was screened at various international film festivals. It was also chosen as India's official entry to be considered for nomination in the Best Foreign Film category for the 84th Academy Awards. Then he made two movies Kunjananthante Kada (2013) and Pathemari (2015) with Mammootty as the lead. The latter won the Best Feature Film In Malayalam award at the 63rd National Film Awards. Salim's latest film is And the Oscar Goes To...(2019), which tells about his own experiences with the production and marketing of his first film.

== Biography ==
=== Early life and family ===
Salim Ahamed was born on 6 July 1971 in Mattannur, Kerala, as the son of Ahamed Kutty and Asya Umma. He graduated in Commerce from Mattannur Pazhassiraja NSS College, and obtained a professional diploma in Travel and Tourism. Upon graduating from college, Salim dreamed of joining the film industry but found it hard to break into and ended up a travel consultant. For his passion, he joined the School of Drama in Thrissur, Kerala. He worked as a Creative Director and Script Writer with Surya TV and then worked in films such as Saphalyam as an Assistant Director. His notable works as a television director include Rasikaraja No.1, a comedy programme telecast in Surya TV.

Salim is married to Mafeedha. They have three sons, Allen Zahar Ahamed, Amal Zahar Ahamed And Adam Zahar Ahamed. Salim Ahamed is now settled at Palottupalli, Mattanur.

=== Adaminte Makan Abu ===
He made his feature film debut with Adaminte Makan Abu, a story he had entertained in his mind for many years. The film portrayed the story of a poor attar (a kind of perfume) seller Abu whose only remaining wish in life is the Hajj pilgrimage, which he strives hard to fulfill, and at the verge of the fulfilment, he opts out when he fears that the means is not fully legitimate. Salim himself co-produced the film, and had to spend every rupee raised from what he had saved up over the years working on scripts for television serials and assisting directors to complete the film. The film opened to critical acclaim and fetched numerous honours including four National Film Awards and four Kerala State Film Awards.

The film was screened at various international film festivals: 55th BFI London Film Festival, MAMI Mumbai Film Festival, 8th South Asian International Film Festival (SAIFF), 42nd International Film Festival of India, 5th Indo-German Film Festival, 17th Kolkata Film Festival, 16th International Film Festival of Kerala (IFFK), 23rd Palm Springs International Film Festival (PSIFF), and 8th Dubai International Film Festival.

=== Other projects ===
Salim had written three basic plots during his college days. One was based in a local school in Kerala, one was a thriller, and the third was the story of Abu. He decided to film Adaminte Makan Abu as a number of people liked the story line; he wanted his first film to have a message and to be impressive. It was reported that he had started the pre-production works of the one based in the local school, as well as was planning to bring the story of Travancore king Marthanda Varma on big screen. However, none of the projects materialised.

Salim officially announced his next project in September 2012. The project was titled Kunjananthante Kada and starred Mammootty in the lead role. The film started production in February 2013 and released in theatres in August 2013. Salim then directed the critically acclaimed Pathemari which follows the life of a Gulf migrant from Kerala who migrated when the Kerala Gulf boom was just beginning. The film won several awards including the National Film Award for Best Feature Film in Malayalam.

== Filmography ==
=== As director ===
Year	Title	Cast
2011	Adaminte Makan Abu	Salim Kumar, Zarina Wahab
2013	Kunjananthante Kada	Mammootty, Nyla Usha, Balachandra Menon
2015	Pathemari	Mammootty, Jewel Mary, Sreenivasan
2019	And The Oscar Goes To...	Tovino Thomas, Anu Sithara

=== As producer ===
Year	Title	Director	Ref.
2022	1001 Nunakal	Thamar K. V.	
2022	Sundari Gardens	Charlie Davis	
2025	Mindiyum Paranjum	Arun Bose	

== Awards ==
National Film Awards

- Best Feature Film – Adaminte Makan Abu
- Best Feature Film In Malayalam- Pathemari (2015)

Kerala State Film Awards

- Best Film – Adaminte Makan Abu
- Best Screenplay – Adaminte Makan Abu

Academy Awards

- Longlisted for Best Foreign Film nomination – Adaminte Makan Abu

Asiavision Awards

- Best Outstanding Indian Film – Adaminte Makan Abu
- Best Debut Director – Adaminte Makan Abu
- 2013 – Asiavision Awards – Socially Committed Movie – Kunjananthante Kada

Filmfare Awards South

- 2016 - Filmfare Award for Best Film – Malayalam for Pathemari

Kazan International Festival of Muslim Cinema (Golden Minbar International Film Festival)

- The Best Feature Film Scenario – Adaminte Makan Abu
- The Prize of the Guild of Film Critics and Film scholars of Russia – Adaminte Makan Abu

International Film Festival of India

- Special Jury Award for Best Film (Silver Peacock) – Adaminte Makan Abu

International Film Festival of Kerala

- NETPAC Award for Best Malayalam Film – Adaminte Makan Abu
- FIPRESCI Award for Best Malayalam Film – Adaminte Makan Abu
- Hassankutty Award for Best Indian Debut Director – Adaminte Makan Abu

Thikkurissy Foundation Awards (2012)

- Best Film – Adaminte Makan Abu
- Best Director – Adaminte Makan Abu

Others

- Special Award at the Vellinakshatram Film Awards – Adaminte Makan Abu
- Shihab Thangal Cultural Award
