= C/O Saira Banu =

- Theatrical release poster
- Directed by: Antony Sony Sebastian
- Screenplay by: RJ Shaan; Bipin Chandran (Additional Dialogues)
- Story by: RJ Shaan
- Produced by: Sheen Helen
- Starring: Manju Warrier; Shane Nigam; Amala Akkineni; Biju Sopanam
- Cinematography: Abdul Rahim
- Edited by: Sagar Dass
- Music by: Mejo Joseph
- Production companies: MAQTRO Motion Pictures; R. V. Films; Eros International
- Distributed by: Eros International
- Release date: 17 March 2017 (India)
- Running time: 156 minutes
- Country: India
- Language: Malayalam

C/O Saira Banu is a 2017 Indian Malayalam legal drama film Produced by MAQTRO Motion Pictures and directed by Antony Sony. It stars Manju Warrier in the title role along with Shane Nigam and Amala Akkineni in lead roles. The film marks the return of Amala to Malayalam cinema after a 25-year hiatus. It was released in India on 17 March 2017.

== Plot ==
Saira Banu is a post woman who leads a peaceful life with her adopted son Joshua Peter. Joshua is the son of a famous photographer Peter George. Peter's unexpected death left Saira as a single mother to Joshua. Joshua, participating in a protest organized by the students of the Government Law College, Ernakulam that he is attending and he is also a student of Law College, assaults a police officer. He fakes a fractured hand and justifies his conduct, later revealing this lie to his mother.

Later Joshua puts forward his wish to go abroad for studying photography. Saira is initially against this but finally agrees to his wish. Their life takes a turn when Joshua is involved in a hit and run case, actually done by his Law college mate. Due to this case, he is imprisoned. A Bengal migrant is murdered in the case and due to strong recommendation of Bengal Government is handling by Advocate Annie John Tharavady, who only handles any case in which she has confidence in success on. With the help of a small time lawyer, Subbu, whom she befriends, Saira seeks out help from various lawyers. When her attempts go in vain she seeks legal aid, but again luck doesn't favour her. As no lawyer was ready to stand with Joshua, Saira decides to advocate herself in the court for him. Though without having any experience in a court, Saira fights for her son in every aspect possible. Finally, with Subbu's help she figures out that migrant from Bengal are being brought to work in Kerala under phoney names by labour contractors and that multiple labourers have been brought under same name. Meanwhile, she also figures out that Annie's son was actually responsible for death of the migrant as he drives her car to celebrate his birthday. Saira decides not to blame Annie's son and brings in a labour who has the same identity as that of the dead migrant. The court sees the discrepancies in the ID of the deceased and drops all charges against Joshua. Saira personally reveals to Annie that she had the truth but chose to hide it. Grateful, Annie thanks Saira for saving her son's life. The movie ends showing Saira setting out to find the deceased's family and to deliver his death news to them.

== Cast ==
- Manju Warrier as Saira Banu
- Shane Nigam as Joshua Peter
- Amala Akkineni as Adv. Annie John Tharavady
- Niranjana Anoop as Arundathi
- Raghavan as District Court Judge Janardhana Kurup
- Sujith Sankar as Sebastian
- Jagadeesh as Advocate
- Ganesh Kumar as Stephen
- P. Balachandran as Adv. Pappan
- Joy Mathew as Peter's friend
- Indrans as construction supervisor
- John Paul as Johnson
- Ashvin Mathew as Adv. Abel Alex
- Sunil Sukhada as Banu's neighbour
- Biju Sopanam as Advocate Subbu
- Kochu Preman as Legal Aid Advocate
- Amith Chakalakkal as Prince Chakalakkal
- Pauly Valsan as Radhamma
- Vettukili Prakash as Warrier
- Jojet John
- Master Vaishnav Sainadh as Arjun
- Mohanlal as Peter George (Voice only)
- Gilu Joseph as Lawyer
- Nimisha Sajayan
- Lukman Avaran as Sound System Operator

== Production ==
C/O Saira Banu is the feature film produced by MAQTRO Motion Pictures as their first movie production venture and is the directorial debut of Sony Antony who is known for his Malayalam short film Moonnamidam. Manju Warrier plays the title character Saira Banu, a Muslim woman who works as a postwoman. According to her, this was her first Muslim character in her film career. RJ Shaan who acted in Moonnamidam scripted the film, with additional contributions from Bipin Chandran. Shane Nigam plays a second year law college student, son of Banu. Earlier, actors like Jayasurya and Fahadh Faasil were considered for the role of the lawyer. Later, the character was turned into a female lawyer and the team approached Amala Akkineni. With the film, Amala Akkineni is returning to Malayalam cinema after a gap of 25 years, since Ulladakkam (1991). C/O Means Care of.

== Release ==
The film was initially planned to release in January 2017, but was postponed and released on 17 March 2017 in India. It released in the Middle East on 4 May.

== Box office ==
This movie collected around 09.0 million from the very first day of release. As per the trade analysts, the movie has collected 13.7 million from Kerala box office with a share of 6 million within first three days after the release. The film slowly gained a foothold over the box office over the days.

== Critical reception ==
The film received mixed reviews from critics alike. G. Ragesh of Manorama Online gave it a rating of 3/5. "While both Manju and Amala go for matured performances as expected from them, it is Shane who steals the show. The film has an interesting plot but the sequences hinder its flow at times. It offers funny moments but comic scenes are not as promising as they were meant to be."

Deepa Soman of Times of India also gave it a rating of 3/5."Amala Akkineni impresses by mouthing some lengthy Malayalam dialogues, that too in the scenes of court room proceedings. Manju Warrier, who was often termed in her first innings as one of the few actresses in Malayalam who can handle humour with ease, hasn't succeeded in regaining her comedy skills yet after the comeback. Most of her attempts at humour fizzle out, but she pulls off the emotional scenes of the film with aplomb. Shane Nigam is the right fit to play Joshua, but one wonders why his expressions are quite limited and uniform – whether angry, sad or indifferent. The film's music by Mejjo Joseph accentuates the scenes quite a bit and is impressive."

Manok Kumar.R of Indian Express gave a rating of 2.5 out of 5. "Director Antony Sony's debut film packs some neat performances and enough surprises to keep the audience hooked to the story. Manju walks away with the film with her charming performance. Shane is convincing as an innocent teenager but it seems like he has one fixed look on his face for all the situations. Amala, who has made her comeback in Malayalam after a gap of more than 20 years, has also delivered a convincing performance as a formidable lawyer with ethical issues. Biju Sopanam deserves a special mention for his performance as an underconfident lawyer with a good heart. "
