= Sooraj S. Kurup =

Indian composer/actor/Singer

- Born: Kottayam, Kerala, India
- Occupations: Singer; Music composer
- Spouse: Sreevidya Balaraman (m. 2017)

Sooraj S. Kurup is an Indian singer, composer and actor who has composed for Malayalam films and Tamil films. He debuted as a feature film composer with the 2016 film Valleem Thetti Pulleem Thetti. He made his debut as an actor with Sakhavu (2017),

== Personal life ==
Sooraj Kurup married Sreevidya Balaraman on 25 January 2017.

== Discography ==
- Note: all films are in Malayalam, unless otherwise noted.

Year	Film	Songs	Score	Notes
2016	Valleem Thetti Pulleem Thetti	check	check	
2016	Kochavva Paulo Ayyappa Coelho	check	☒	
2016	Ann Maria Kalippilaanu	☒	check	
2017	Alamara	check	check	
2017	Solo	check	check	Simultaneously shot in Tamil; song: Sita Kalyanam
2017	Crossroad	check	check	
2018	Kinavalli	☒	check	
2018	Vandi	check	check	Tamil film
2019	Luca	check	check	
2020	Kilometers and Kilometers	check	☒	
2021	The Great Indian Kitchen	check	☒	
2021	Nizhal	check	check	
2024	Super Zindagi	check	check	
2025	Meesha	check	check	
2025	Mindiyum Paranjum	check	check	
