= Diwanjimoola Grand Prix =

- Theatrical release poster
- Directed by: Anil Radhakrishnan Menon
- Screenplay by: Anil Radhakrishnan Menon; Prasanth M. Nair IAS
- Story by: Anil Radhakrishnan Menon
- Produced by: Masood TP; Safeer K. P. Sherin Vennemkattil
- Starring: Kunchacko Boban; Nyla Usha; Vinayakan
- Cinematography: Alex J. Pulickal
- Edited by: Manoj Kannoth
- Music by: Gopi Sunder
- Production companies: Mars Entertainment; Silver Ocean; Grand Pixels
- Distributed by: Central Pictures
- Release date: 5 January 2018
- Running time: 124 minutes
- Country: India
- Language: Malayalam

Diwanjimoola Grand Prix is a 2018 Indian Malayalam language sports comedy film directed by Anil Radhakrishnan Menon and produced by Masood TP, Safeer K. P., and Sherin Vennemkattil. The screenplay was co written by Menon and former Kozhikode District Collector Prasanth M. Nair, with dialogues by Riyas Marath.

The film stars Kunchacko Boban, Nyla Usha, Vinayakan, Nedumudi Venu, Siddique and Sijoy Varghese. It was theatrically released on 5 January 2018.

== Plot ==
Sajan Joseph IAS is appointed as the District Collector of Thrissur, known for his disciplined approach and commitment to public service. While assessing the district’s social and cultural decline, he learns about Diwanjimoola, a locality that once thrived due to its popular motorcycle racing tradition, which had been discontinued decades earlier because of political interference and internal conflicts.

Believing that the revival of the Diwanjimoola motorcycle race could restore community spirit and address long standing grievances, Sajan initiates efforts to bring back the event after thirty years. His decision draws opposition from influential local figures, particularly Jithendran, whose past is closely tied to the downfall of the race and unresolved personal rivalries.

As preparations progress, several individuals with emotional and personal stakes become involved. Vareedh, a rebellious local youth, sees the race as an opportunity for redemption, while Effy Mol emerges as a strong presence influencing the unfolding events. The revival effort brings suppressed tensions to the surface, exposing political manipulation, broken relationships, and social inequality.

The Diwanjimoola Grand Prix eventually transcends its identity as a sporting event. It becomes a catalyst for reconciliation and reform, uniting different sections of society while reinforcing the importance of integrity, cultural heritage, and responsible governance.

== Cast ==
- Kunchacko Boban as Sajan Joseph IAS
- Nyla Usha as Effy Mol
- Vinayakan as Vareedh
- Siddique as Jithendran
  - Shaheen Siddique as Young Jithendran
- Nedumudi Venu as Davisettan
- Nirmal Palazhi as Sivan
- Sijoy Varghese as Christo
- Rahul Rajasekharan as Saththan
- Ketaki Narayan as Peeli Mol
- Rajeev Rajan as Elluminungi
- Jithin Paramel as Para
- Ravi Menon as Alavi
- Rajeev Pillai as Gunman PP Shibu
- Assim Jamal as CA Kunjahammad
- Midhun Ramesh as Himself
- Vijayan Peringodu as Narayanan
- Manikandan Pattambi as Anirudhan
- Hareesh Kanaran as Ganeshan
- Abraham Koshy as Accomplice
- Ashokan as Rishi
- Sudheer Karamana as Leaf Vasu
- Tini Tom as Subramanian
- Umar Payyanur as Taxi driver

== Production ==
Anil Radhakrishnan Menon co wrote the screenplay with Prasanth M. Nair, the former Kozhikode district collector. Principal photography began on 12 April 2017 in Thrissur, Kerala. The film was shot across various locations in Thrissur and parts of Ernakulam.

Several actors were selected through auditions, and the film marked the debut of many cast members. A motion poster was released on 18 October 2017, coinciding with Diwali.

== Critical reception ==
Meenakshy Menon of Cinema Express rated the film 3.5 out of 5 and praised its narrative flow and thematic clarity. Sanjith Sasidharan of The Times of India rated the film 3 out of 5, noting its social commentary and light satirical tone. Filmibeat rated the film 3.5 out of 5, highlighting its performances and humour.

== Soundtrack ==
The songs and background score were composed by Gopi Sunder. Lyrics were written by Harinarayanan.
