= Porinju Mariam Jose =

- Theatrical release poster
- Directed by: Joshiy
- Written by: Abhilash N. Chandran
- Produced by: Rejimon
- Starring: Joju George; Nyla Usha; Chemban Vinod Jose; Vijayaraghavan; Rahul Madhav
- Cinematography: Ajay David Kachappilly
- Edited by: Shyam Sasidharan
- Music by: Jakes Bejoy
- Production companies: David Kachappilly Productions; Kirthana Movies; Appu Pathu Pappu Production House
- Distributed by: Chand V Creations
- Release date: 23 August 2019
- Running time: 150 minutes
- Country: India
- Language: Malayalam

Porinju Mariam Jose is a 2019 Indian Malayalam-language period action thriller film directed by Joshiy from a screenplay written by Abhilash N. Chandran and produced by Rejimon. The film stars Joju George, Nyla Usha, and Chemban Vinod Jose as the titular characters, while Vijayaraghavan and Rahul Madhav play supporting roles. The music was composed by Jakes Bejoy with cinematography by Ajay David Kachappilly and editing by Shyam Sasidharan. The story is loosely based on real events that occurred during the 1980s and 1990s in Thrissur.

Porinju Mariam Jose was released on 23 August 2019 to generally positive reviews from critics and audiences. It became the fifth Malayalam film of 2019 to successfully complete 100 days in theatres after Lucifer, Kumbalangi Nights, Uyare, and Madhura Raja. It was deemed as a huge commercial comeback for Joshiy. It is remade in Telugu as Naa Saami Ranga, starring Nagarjuna.

== Plot ==
1965: Porinju Joy and Puthanpally Jose are best friends in their youth. Jose tries to persuade Porinju to confess his love to Alappattu Mariyam Varghese, but a timid Porinju could not. One day at school, a boy bullies Mariyam and a fight ensues between him and Porinju. Since the boy is from an influential family and Porinju is from a poor family, the teacher punishes Porinju alone by striking him repeatedly. Porinju and Jose shout at the teacher and leave the school, never to return. Mariyam openly condemns the teacher's behavior in front of the class and gets scolded.

1985: Porinju is now known as Kattalan (transl. hunter; lit. 'man of the forest'). He is now a village butcher and a henchman of Iype Muthalali, a wealthy and powerful real estate dealer in the locality. Porinju is very close to Iype, but Iype's sons do not like their relationship. Jose is now an aspiring disco dancer and constantly performs his moves at the annual Perunnal of the church. Mariyam is now a moneylender. The three are still close friends, even though Mariyam has now become critical of both Porinju and Jose for their troublesome lives. Porinju often openly woos Mariyam, which she ignores.

On a perunnal night, a procession is passing in front of Mariyam's house, where Jose is dancing along with Mariyam. Meanwhile, Iype's grandson, Prince, gropes Mariyam, and she humiliates him publicly. Jose beats Prince and drives him back to his house. As the procession advances later towards Iype's house, Prince tells his uncles about the incident, and they beat Jose together. Porinju breaks up the fight, but Prince still beats him, leading Porinju and Jose to retaliate and beat up Prince and his uncles. Though Iype witnesses his sons and grandson getting beaten up, he ignores it. It is later revealed that Mariyam was about to elope with Porinju, but her father, Varghese, tied a rope around his neck and threatened to hang himself from a tree if she ran away. However, Varghese accidentally lost his grip and hanged himself. Because of this, Mariyam lives alone without marrying Porinju, though she loves him. A year later, as the perunnal nears, Prince arranges for hitmen to kill both Porinju and Jose. Jose gets killed at a movie theater. For this, Porinju exacts revenge and hacks Prince to death in front of the perunnal procession. Prince's uncles arrange for other hitmen to kill Porinju, but Porinju kills them all and scares the uncles away, choosing to spare them for Iype's sake.

Meanwhile, Mariyam arranges to get bail for Porinju in case he goes to court for the killings. Iype and his household are mourning Prince's death. The procession passes by the house, and he comes out to greet them. Porinju also arrives, and the two dance happily. However, Iype takes out a hidden knife and stabs Porinju multiple times, saying that his grandson's life mattered to him, but not to Porinju. The bystanders surround Iype, but Porinju snatches the knife, tells everyone to back off, and orders Iype to go back into his house. Mariyam arrives, and Porinju dies in her arms. Sometime later, she stands in front of his gravestone, which also has her name inscribed on it with a vacant death date.

== Cast ==
- Joju George as Kattalan Porinju Joy
  - Amal Shah as Young Porinju
- Nyla Usha as Alappattu Mariyam Varghese, Porinju's love interest
  - Meenakshi Dinesh as Young Mariyam
- Chemban Vinod Jose as Puthanpali Jose, Porinju's Childhood best friend
  - Govind V. Pai as Young Jose
- Vijayaraghavan as Iype Muthalali
- Rahul Madhav as Prince, Iype's grandson
- Sudhi Koppa as Puthanpalli Babu, Jose's brother
- Salim Kumar as Beedi Joy, Porinju's father
- TG Ravi as Puthanpalli Anthony, Jose's father
- Sarasa Balussery as Jose's mother
- Nandu as Alappattu Varghese, Mariyam's father
- Swasika as Lizy, Jose's wife
- Malavika Menon as Lilly
- Parvathi T. as Susanna, Prince's mother
- Sadhika Venugopal as Alice
- Remya Panicker as Sherly
- I. M. Vijayan as Kuriyachira George (cameo)
- Disney James as Stephen
- Sadiq as Muyalan Chandy
- Jayaraj Warrier as Tinto
- Anil Nedumangad as Raphael
- Surjith Gopinath as Bolshevik payli
- Niyas Backeras Varkey
- Abhishek Raveendran as Anto
- Nisthar Sait as SI Avaran
- E A Rajendran as Peter, School Principal
- Sinoj Varghese as Manja
- Nanda Kishore as Father Irumbanakkal
- Jayaprakash Kuloor as Advocate Veerabhadra Menon
- Davia Mary Ben as Minimol
- Billy Murali as Prince's henchman
- Raghuram as childhood villain Malaakkaaran Paul

== Soundtrack ==
The soundtrack was composed by Jakes Bejoy, with one song composed by Angamaly Francis.

No.	Title	Lyrics	Music	Singer(s)	Length
1.	"Innale Njaanoru"	Angamaly Francis	Angamaly Francis	PK Sunil Kumar, Sethu Thankachan, Balu Thankachan, Jakes Bejoy	2:16
2.	"Manamariyunnolu"	Jyothish T Kasi	Jakes Bejoy	Vijay Yesudas, Sachin Raj	4:51
3.	"Neela Maalaakhe"	B. K. Harinarayanan	Jakes Bejoy	Keshav Vinod	4:36
4.	"Peda Pedayana"	Jyothish T Kasi	Jakes Bejoy	Jakes Bejoy, Keshav Vinod, Jithin, Merin Gregory	4:01
Total length:					15:44

== Production ==
Abhilash N. Chandran has penned the story and screenplay. Manju Warrier has been initially approached to do the role of Mariyam, but she backed out due to date issues. The role went to Nyla Usha which became a break for her and her career best. Later, due to schedule conflicts, Biju Menon was replaced by Joju George while Chemban Vinod Jose was earlier confirmed.

== Release ==
The film was released in India and the Gulf Cooperation Council territories on 23 August 2019.

=== Box office ===
The film grossed $309,267 from 39 screens in the opening weekend (23 – 25 August) in the United Arab Emirates and $541,287 in three weeks. It earned $8,133 (₹5.77 lakh) from seven screens in the opening weekend (20 – 22 September) in the United States. It was the fifth film of 2019 after Lucifer, Kumbalangi Nights, Uyare and Virus to successfully complete 100 days in theaters.

=== Critical reception ===
The New Indian Express rated 3.5 on a scale of 5 and called it "an intense, high-voltage thriller", and that "the storytelling is not exactly fresh, but the actors and the cathartic violence make Joshiy's latest film compelling". Sify rated 3.5 in a scale of 5, but called it an "average masala entertainer" and said the film "may be far from perfect but is well packaged and is genuinely engaging", but situations are mostly predictable and at times, unconvincing. But praised the performances of Joju, Nyla and Jose. Manorama Online rated 3 out of 5 and wrote: "Joshiy engineers the twin shades of noir and romance, deftly interchanging them at the right moments, for a smooth glide of the narration. DOP by Ajay David Kachappilly and the brilliant music by Jakes Bejoy compliment [sic] each other and elevate the movie to several notches above".

Rating 3 out of 5 stars, The News Minute called it a "lovely drama" and "Joshiy makes it a very enjoyable movie to watch, but the second half does not keep up with the neatly built-up first half". The Times of India also rated 3 out of 5 and said the film has good story, cast and reasonable performances (particularly Jose's), but "Porinju Mariyam Jose gets tad bit predictable. But one may watch it for the spectacle at offer by the narrative genius and the unrequited love story in the sidelines". Deccan Chronicle rated 3 out of 5 stars and stated that "in spite of a slightly stretched storytelling and a predictive second half, PMJ is a good watch".

The Hindu wrote that in the film, "one gets to see a filmmaker who has been closely watching the changing rules of the game, and trying to adapt", but the film is "fairly predictable, and at times tame ... but what makes it watchable are the array of characters, and the performances, especially of Chemban and Joju. They are all colourfully written, and there is a lot of life to them". HuffPost had the opinion that the film may have worked better in the '80s", "the talented cast is let down by a clichéd narrative and a director stuck on his old-school filmmaking skills". Firstpost rated 1.75 in 5, saying that the "basic story is interesting, and there is a lot this film could have been", but with a "weak writing of its leads, it is unsurprising that Porinju Mariam Jose fails to be an involved, emotionally engrossing narrative".

== Remake ==
The film has been remade in Telugu as Naa Saami Ranga with Nagarjuna in the lead role.
