= Marivillin Gopurangal =

- Theatrical release poster
- Directed by: Arun Bose
- Written by: Arun Bose; Pramod Mohan
- Produced by: Kokers Media Entertainments
- Starring: Indrajith Sukumaran; Shruti Ramachandran; Sarjano Khalid; Vincy Aloshious
- Cinematography: Syamaprakash M. S.
- Edited by: Arun Bose; Shaijal P. V.
- Music by: Vidyasagar
- Production company: Kokers Media Entertainments
- Distributed by: Kokers Media Entertainments
- Release date: 10 May 2024
- Country: India
- Language: Malayalam

Marivillin Gopurangal is a 2024 Indian Malayalam-language drama film directed by Arun Bose. The story was written by Arun Bose and Pramod Mohan. It stars Indrajith Sukumaran, Shruti Ramachandran, Sarjano Khalid and Vincy Aloshious. It was theatrically released on 10 May 2024.

Principal photography began in late April 2023 and wrapped up in late June 2023. The film has music composed by Vidyasagar. The cinematography was handled by Syamaprakash M. S., while the editing was done by Shaijal P. V. and Arun Bose.

== Plot ==
Shinto and Sherin are a married couple who have no children. Their life changes after Shinto's brother Rony comes to their house with his pregnant girlfriend Meenakshi, bringing both chaos and unexpected blessings.

== Cast ==
- Indrajith Sukumaran as Shock Shinto Chacko
- Shruti Ramachandran as Sherin
- Sarjano Khalid as Rony Chacko
- Vincy Aloshious as Meenakshi Rajan
- Sai Kumar as Chacko
- Johny Antony as RoRo director
- Salim Kumar as Thomas
- Bindu Panicker as Sherin's mother
- Unni Meghalan
- Vasisht Umesh
- Asif Ali as himself (Cameo appearance)

== Production ==
Principal photography began on 24 April 2023 in Kochi with a customary puja ceremony. Indrajith Sukumaran reportedly joined the set on 29 April 2023 after completing his shoot for Varun G. Panicker's Njan Kandatha Sir'e. The filming wrapped up in late June 2023.

== Soundtrack ==
The music was composed by Vidyasagar, while the lyrics were written by Vinayak Sasikumar. The audio rights were acquired by Muzik 247.

== Release ==
There were reports that the film would release in November 2023. The overseas distribution rights were sold to Resh Raj Film and Play Films.
