= And the Oscar Goes To =

- Directed by: Salim Ahamed
- Written by: Salim Ahamed
- Produced by: Salim Ahamed; Prasanthkumar Chandran; TP Sudheesh
- Starring: Tovino Thomas; Anu Sithara; Sreenivasan; Siddique; Salim Kumar
- Cinematography: Madhu Ambat
- Edited by: Vijay Shankar
- Music by: Bijibal
- Production companies: Allens Media; Canadian Movie
- Distributed by: Kalasangham Films
- Release date: 21 June 2019
- Running time: 124 minutes
- Country: India
- Language: Malayalam

And the Oscar Goes To is a 2019 Indian Malayalam-language drama film written and directed by Salim Ahamed and starring Tovino Thomas and Anu Sithara

== Plot ==
Issak Ebraham is a young man who wants to become a film director. Issak decides to direct and co-produce a film based on a previous screenplay depicting the life of his native Moidukka. Issak mortgages the land he received as part of the property for the money needed for the construction. Then to actor Aravind and cinematographer Sivakumar Tells this story and agrees that they can make a movie. Although he suffers from a lack of money during filming, he eventually completes his first film, 'Sky of Fireflies'. Issak, with the help of Sivakumar, submits the film for the award on the last day to apply for the national award. At that year's National Awards, Aravindan won the Best Actor award and the film won the Best Picture award. Issak's film is officially submitted by India to compete for that year's Academy Award for Best Foreign Language Film. Following this, Maria, a representative of a foreign marketing company, sees Isaak's film.

Prince, a friend of Issak, who had gone abroad) And introduced Prince to the screening of the film. Although a few screenings have been successful, Maria angrily treats Issak after failing to pay Issak immediately, and quarrels with Issak and Prince over the lack of food for the final guests. Prince, who is very passionate about the movie, is in a lot of pain over this incident. Days later, Issak finds out that his picture is not on the final list for the Oscars and is about to return home. Issak completes the story of his new film, The Oscar Goes To, based on his experiences there before leaving. Returning home, Issak first visits Moidukka. He also meets Moiduka's son Harshad there. The film ends with the return of Moidukka's son who was imprisoned abroad in the movie Minnaminungukalude Aakasham (transl. Sky of Fireflies). But Moidukka tells Issak that Harshad has not actually returned to full health. Issak apologizes to Moidukka and leaves the house.

== Cast ==
- Tovino Thomas as Issak Ebrahem
- Anu Sithara as Chithra
- Nikki Rae Hallow as Maria
- Siddique as Prince
- Vijayaraghavan as Ebrahim
- Salim Kumar as Moidukka
- Sreenivasan as Aravindan
- Lal as Shivakumar
- Santhosh Keezhattoor as Basheer
- Dinesh Prabhakar as Kabeer
- Appani Sarath as Manuraman
- Parvathi T. as Khadeeja
- Kavitha Nair as Film actress Seetha
- Anu Joseph as Sameera
- Zarina Wahab as Ummunkulsu
- Jaffar Idukki as Pareethikka
- Hareesh Kanaran as Babumon

== Release ==
The Hindu wrote that "Many of the scenes have ‘artificial’ written all over it, with the badly written dialogues making it even worse". Manorama Online wrote that "The biggest strength of 'And The Oscar Goes To' lies within the team. The actors -- Siddique, Anu Sithara, Salim Kumar, Appani Sarath, Nikki Hulowski, Sreenivasan - everyone manages to create an impression". The Times of India gave the film a rating of three-and-a-half out of five stars and stated that "And The Oscar Goes To is a story of big dreams, perseverance and challenges. For those looking for some inspiration to dare to aim high, which makes most of us, it would be an apt pick for the weekend." The film dubbed in Telugu with same title and released on Aha.

== Awards and nominations ==
Year	Award	Category	Nominee	Result	Ref.
2019	Alberta Film Festival	Best Film	And the Oscar Goes To...	Won	
2019	Alberta Film Festival	Best Actor	Tovino Thomas	Won	
2019	Alberta Film Festival	Best Director	Salim Ahamed	Won	
2019	Alberta Film Festival	Best Supporting Actress	Nikki Rae Hallow	Won	
