= Arun Bose =

Indian filmmaker

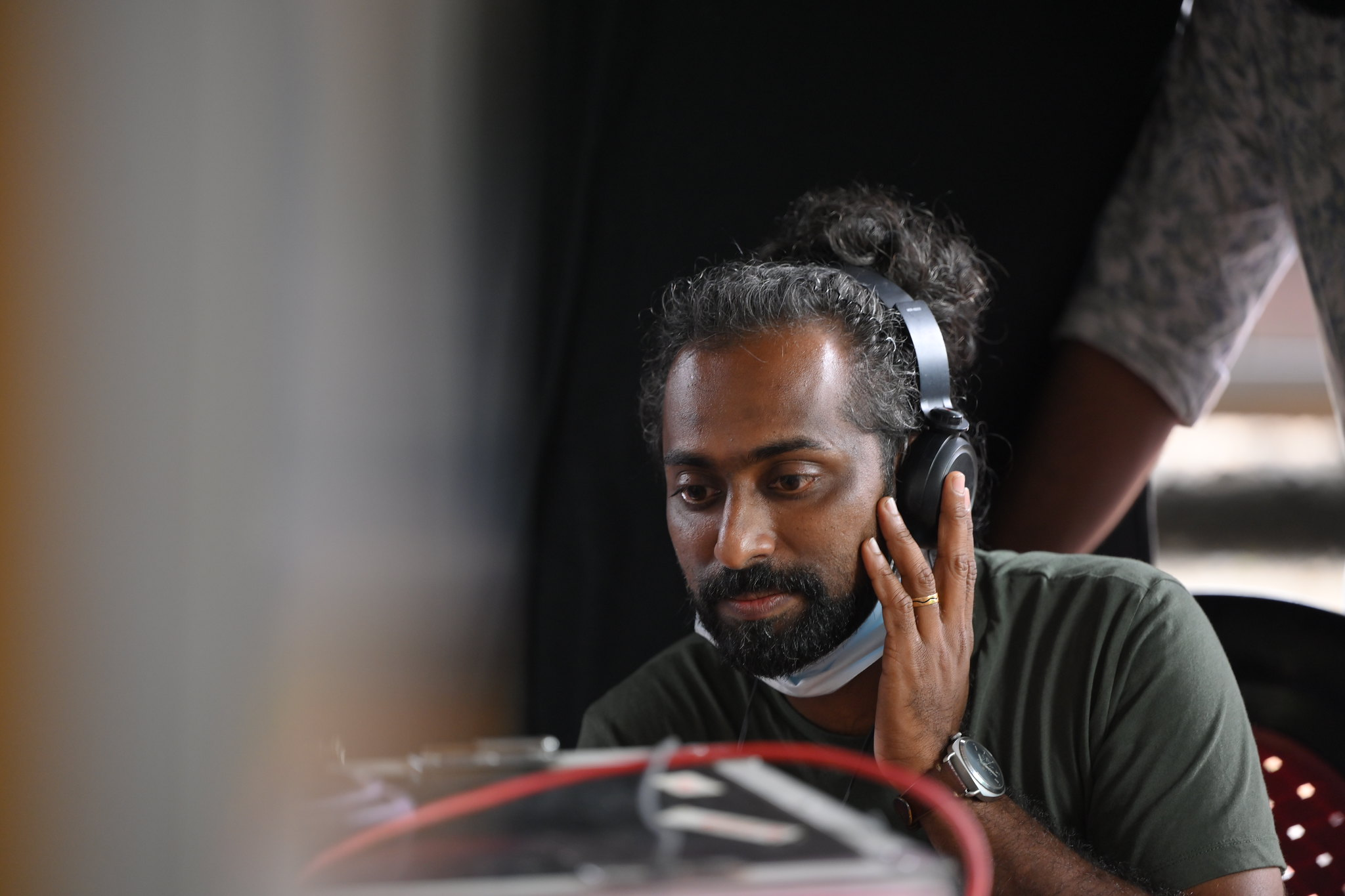
- Born: 21 December 1982 (age 43); Muvattupuzha, Ernakulam, Kerala, India
- Education: St. Joseph's Degree & PG College, Hyderabad; Madras Christian College, Chennai
- Occupations: Film director; Screenwriter; Film editor
- Years active: 2007–present
- Spouse: Minu Sadasivan (m. 2019)
- Children: Kriti Prakriti

Arun Bose (born 21 December 1982) is an Indian film director, screenwriter, film editor and producer predominantly working in the Malayalam film industry. He made his directorial debut with the Malayalam feature film Luca (2019) starring Tovino Thomas and Ahaana Krishna.He has also won Thikkurissi Film Awards 2026 for the film Mindyum Paranjum.

He has also produced, scripted, photographed and directed an experimental Tamil feature film titled Alaiyin Thisai. His second Malayalam feature film Mindiyum Paranjum produced by Salim Ahamed has Unni Mukundan and Aparna Balamurali in the lead. Arun Bose is also a visiting faculty at various film and media schools like L. V. Prasad College of Media Studies, Chennai, Madras Christian College, Chennai etc.

== Personal life ==
Arun Bose was born on 21 December 1982 in Muvattupuzha, Kerala as the son of S. R. C. Bose and Rema Bose. He graduated in Computer Science from St. Joseph's Degree & PG College, Hyderabad and later did a Master of Arts in communication studies from Madras Christian College, Chennai. Arun is married to Minu Sadasivan and now settled at Kochi, Kerala. During the initial days of his career, he has worked as the program officer of National Folklore Support Centre.

== Filmography ==
Year	Title	Language	Positions	Notes
TBA	Untitled Vismaya Mohanlal movie	Malayalam	Director	
2025	Mindiyum Paranjum	Malayalam	Director, Writer	Winner, Best film with a message, 49th Kerala Film Critics Award 2025; Winner, Best Director, Thikkurissi Film Awards 2025
2024	Marivillin Gopurangal	Malayalam	Director	
2019	Luca	Malayalam	Director, Writer	
2018	Alaiyin Thisai	Tamil	Director, Writer, Cinematographer	
2012	Pedana Kalamkari	English, Telugu	Director, Writer, Editor, Cinematographer	Documentary film
2010	My Paper Boat	Silent	All	Documentary film; Screened at the 2009 United Nations Climate Change Conference
2007	The Story of Mudugar	English, Malayalam	Director, Writer, Editor, Cinematographer	Documentary film
