= Kunjananthante Kada =

2013 film by Salim Ahamed

- Theatrical Release Poster
- Directed by: Salim Ahamed
- Written by: Salim Ahamed
- Starring: Mammootty; Nyla Usha; Salim Kumar; Balachandra Menon; Siddique
- Cinematography: Madhu Ambat
- Edited by: Vijay Shankar
- Music by: M. Jayachandran (songs); Isaac Thomas Kottukapally (background score)
- Production company: Alans Media
- Distributed by: Kalasangham Films
- Release date: 30 August 2013
- Running time: 130 min
- Country: India
- Language: Malayalam

Kunjananthante Kada is a 2013 Malayalam drama film written and directed by Salim Ahamed. The film stars Mammootty in the title role, alongside debutante actress Nyla Usha while Salim Kumar and Balachandra Menon play other pivotal roles. The story is about a small-time shopkeeper in Kannur and his attempt to find his place in a rapidly changing world.

The film features original background score composed by Isac Thomas Kottukapally. The songs featured are composed by M. Jayachandran. Madhu Ambat is the cinematographer, while sound design, editing, and mixing were handled by Resul Pookutty. The film's shooting commenced in February 2013. and it was released on 30 August 2013. Mammootty won Asianet Film Award for Best Actor.

== Plot ==
The story is set in a village around the Mattannur-Iritty area of Kannur, Kerala. Kunjananthan (Mammootty) manages a provision store in the village. Resigned to an unhappy marriage, the shop is the centre of his existence. The owner of the building pleads with him to vacate the shop so that he may settle his debts, but Kunjananthan does not relent. Eviction, however, seems unavoidable when the government tries to acquire land for a road development project. Kunjanthan's travails to retain the shop form the second half of the film.

== Cast ==
- Mammootty as Kunjananthan
- Nyla Usha as Chithira
- Salim Kumar
- Balachandra Menon
- Thesni Khan
- Siddique
- Navneeth Madhav as Kunjananthan's son

== Reception ==
The film opened with mixed reviews from critics. Sharika C. of The Hindu said, "Forget Adaminte Makan Abu, its many laurels, the director who held out a lot of promise and watch this one without strings attached. And you may be a little less disappointed." Jisha G. Nair of Malayala Manorama rated the film 3/5 and concluded her review saying, "The film lags throughout, which may bore the audience. At times, the expressions of the actors and the delivery of dialogues could have been more realistic and strong to have the originality and seriousness of the issues. The last word is that the film is not a complete entertainer." Paresh C Palicha of Rediff.com rated the film 2.5/5 and said, "Kunjananthante Kada is a half baked story which leaves us feeling something is amiss all the time." Sify.com gave the verdict as "average" and commented, "Kunjananthante Kada has its moments that need to be appreciated for sure, but you get the feeling that the viewers have been taken for granted by the makers here. It is hard not to be disappointed by this one!" Contrastingly, Aswin J. Kumar of The Times of India wrote a positive review and said that Kunjananthante Kada is "a film Salim Ahamed can be proud of." Mammootty received the Best Actor award at Asianet Film Awards.
