= Jewel Mary =

Indian actress and television presenter

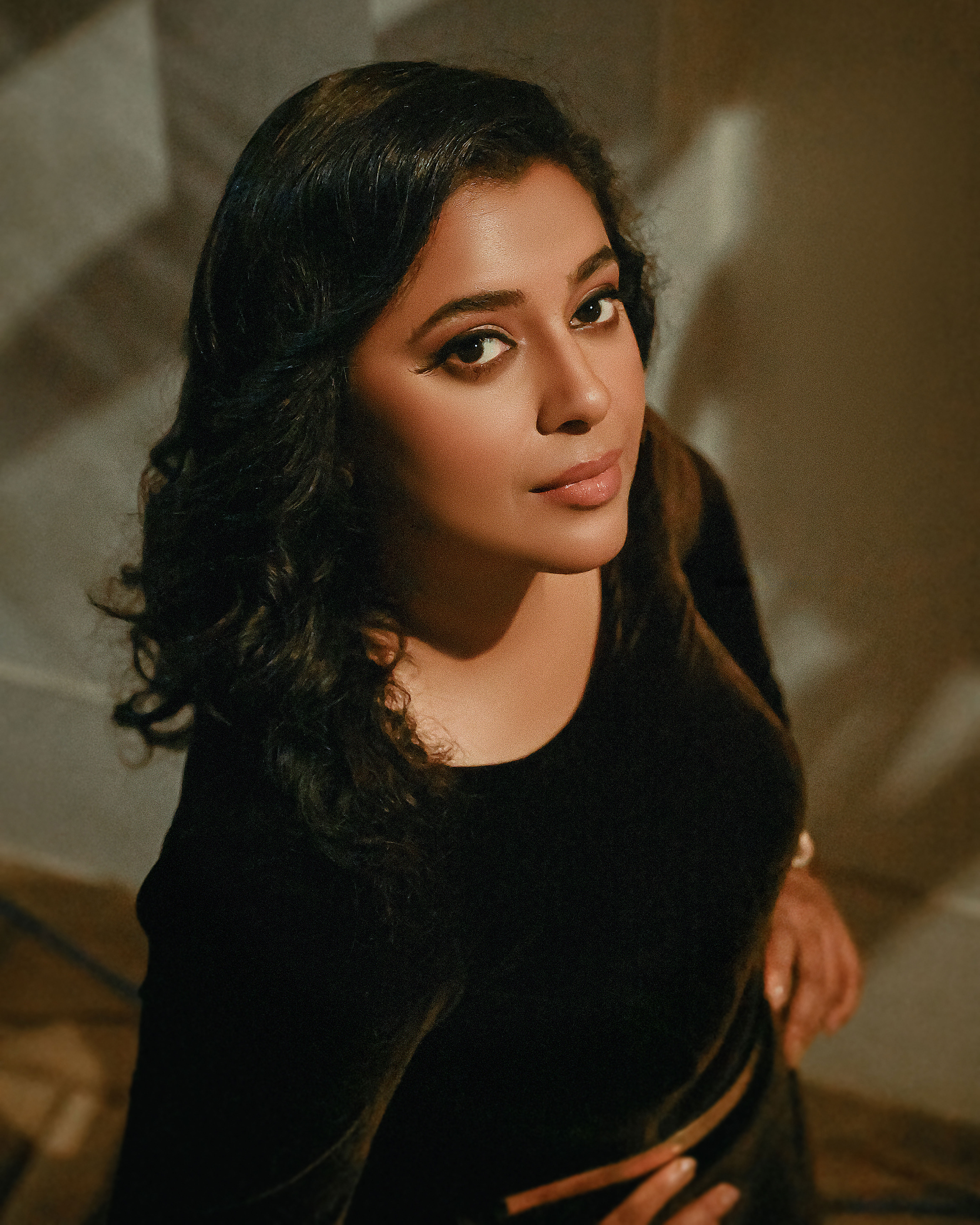
- Occupations: Actor; television host; model; emcee
- Years active: 2015–present
- Spouse: Jenson Zachariah (m. 2015)

Jewel Mary is an Indian actress and television presenter, who works in Malayalam films and television field.

== Career ==
In school she performed in ballet, and in college she started working as master of ceremonies, mostly for corporate events. In 2014, she began her career as a television presenter, co-hosting the reality show D 4 Dance on Mazhavil Manorama, alongside Govind Padmasoorya. Later she forayed into films, debuting with Pathemari. She has acted in several movies and hosted many reality TV shows and celebrity award nights across the globe.

== Personal life ==
In April 2015, Jewel Mary married Jenson Zachariah, a television producer. They were divorced in 2024.

== Filmography ==
Year	Title	Role	Notes
2015	Utopiayile Rajavu	Umadevi	
2015	Pathemari	Nalini	
2016	Ore Mukham	Amala	
2017	Thrissivaperoor Kliptham	Sunitha P.S I.A.S.	
2017	Annadurai	Chitra	Tamil film
2018	Njan Marykutty	Jovi	
2022	Maamanithan	Philomi	Tamil film
2022	Paappan	Dr. Priya Nalini/Draupathi	Cameo
2022	Kshanikam	Supriya	
2023	Antony	Priya	
2023	A Ranjith Cinema	Teena Sunny	
2025	Get-Set Baby	Sushmita Alexander	

=== Music Album ===
Year	Title	Role	Language	Notes
2022	Bella Ciao	Herself	English	Music album

=== Television ===
Year	Title	Role	Channel
2014	D 4 Dance: Season 1	Co-host	Mazhavil Manorama
2015	Smart Show	Participant	Flowers TV
2016	Dhe Chef: Season 1	Co-host	Mazhavil Manorama
2016	Christmas Carnival (launch show of Komedy Circus)	Host	Mazhavil Manorama
2017–2018	Urvashi Theatres	Host	Asianet
2017	Ningalkkum Aakaam Kodeeshwaran	Participant	Asianet
2018-2019	Thamasha Bazaar	Host	Zee Keralam
2020	Top Singer season 2	Host	Flowers TV
2020–2022	Star Singer Season 8	Host	Asianet
2021	Snehapoorvam Somuvinu	Host	Asianet
2021	Samrambhaka	Host	Flowers TV
2021	Comedy Kondattam	Host	Flowers TV
2022-2023	Star Singer junior Season 3	Host	Asianet
