= Luca (2019 film) =

Film by Arun Bose

- Directed by: Arun Bose
- Written by: Arun Bose; Mridul George
- Produced by: Linto Thomas; Prince Hussain
- Starring: Tovino Thomas; Ahaana Krishna; Anwar Shereef; Nithin George; Thalivasal Vijay; Sooraj S Kurup; Shalu Rahim; Neethu Bala
- Cinematography: Nimish Ravi
- Edited by: Nikhil Venu
- Music by: Sooraj S. Kurup
- Production companies: Stories & Thoughts Productions
- Release date: 28 June 2019
- Running time: 151 minutes
- Country: India
- Language: Malayalam
- Budget: ₹7 crore
- Box office: ₹20 crore

Luca is a 2019 Indian Malayalam-language drama film directed by Arun Bose and produced by Linto Thomas and Prince Hussain under the studio Stories & Thoughts Productions. The film is co-written by Mridul George and stars Tovino Thomas and Ahaana Krishna in lead roles. Sooraj S. Kurup is the music director.

== Plot ==
The film starts off with an unexpected event that sets in motion an investigation by police officer Akbar. A diary that Akbar reads takes the audience through the lives of Luca and Niharika, with the diary playing the role of a storyteller.

Luca is a talented scrap artist with a very small circle of friends. Luca does not know how to control his anger and he expresses them in violent streaks when something irritates him. The film is set against the backdrop of Kochi Biennale and Luca locks horns with Niharika when she passes simple remarks about his installation. She later seeks his forgiveness and moves into his home as a paying guest. From there they develop a very close relationship and an all encompassing love. He had mental problems after his mother's passing away and still has a fear of anything that is related to death (Necrophobia), and arts is a distraction from these aspects. Niharika after knowing this takes on the role of a calming figure for him. When he simmers with anger she becomes his guiding strength ready to brave every storm that threatens them to any ‘end’. Whenever Luca has panic attacks about death-related matters, Niharika becomes his comfort. Niharika was abused in her childhood by a close relative and that has left a permanent emotional scar. Luca becomes the loving force that fills her emptiness.

Their dreamy world shatters when Luca is diagnosed with stage four cancer. After coming to know this, Luca's and Niharika’s relationship gets strained. Luca becomes more worried about his death and Niharika is breaking down to see his condition, which affects him more by seeing her tears. So two weeks before his demise, Luca has Niharika move to Bangalore, her home town. During the investigation it becomes known that Niharika killed herself. A week before Luca's death she sent him a diary before she exhibited her last breath through oral poisoning. Akbar reading the diary, is going through the chain of events in Luca's and Niharika's begone lives, and begins to be affected. Akbar is fighting his own demons with a prior failed relationship meanwhile at an impending divorce with his wife Fathima. Luca's and Niharika's love story changes him at some point, while he solves his case. Akbar struggles to find the final piece of the case of how Luca died. He has a friendly conversation where he conveys the Story of Luca and Niharika to Fathima for which she gives her opinion. Fathima states that in the whole world it's Niharika's wish to make Luca's death without pain and full of ease. This strikes Akbar's Mind. It is later revealed that Niharika being a chemistry student makes a poison herself after going back to Bangalore. Luca had a habit of turning pages with the help of saliva and keeping this in mind, Niharika applies the poison in her diary which Luca longed to read. She couriers her diary to him, which he read the way she had imagined and he died peacefully without any pain or discomfort; thereby protecting him from all the worldly pains by going to an extreme extent, as she had mentioned to him previously.

In the climax of film it shown that Fathima tearing the Akbar's ex lover photo indicates that he is ready to move forward by forgetting all his past. Meanwhile friends of Luca enter his home with the key he given to them long ago.

== Cast ==
- Tovino Thomas as Luca
- Ahaana Krishna as Niharika Banerjee a.k.a. Niha
- Nithin George as Akbar Hussein
- Anwar Shereef as Aloshi
- Neethu Bala as Jannet
- Rajesh Sharma as Sivan Ashan
- Vinitha Koshy as Fathima
- Sooraj S Kurup as Sooraj
- Shalu Rahim as Rohan
- Chembil Ashokan as Martin
- Devi Ajith as Forensic surgeon
- Jaffer Idukki as Antony
- Neena Kurup as Adv. Amala
- Pauly Valsan as Salomi
- Srikanth Murali as Jayaprakash
- Thalaivasal Vijay as Police officer Jayaraman
- Raghavan as Doctor

== Production ==
Luca was announced by Tovino Thomas on 17 September 2017. It is the feature film directorial debut of filmmaker Arun Bose and scripted by Mridul George and Arun Bose. The film is produced by Linto Thomas and Prince Hussain under their production house Stories & Thoughts Productions. Gokul Nath G is the executive producer. According to the posters that have come out, Tovino Thomas is said to play an artist. Production will be controlled by Job George, while Remya Suresh will handle the costumes department, the art director is Anees Nadody, Nimish Ravi is the cinematographer and Sooraj S. Kurup will compose the songs. The editing work is done by Nikhil Venu and The Sound Design is done by Joby Sony Thomas and Prasanth PM.

== Soundtrack ==
Luca

Soundtrack album by Sooraj S. Kurup
- Genre: Film soundtrack
- Length: 15:45
- Language: Malayalam
- Label: Muzik247
- Producers: Linto Thomas; Prince Hussain

The soundtrack for Luca was composed by Sooraj S. Kurup. Song released under Muzik247 official label

== Release ==
Luca was released on 28 June 2019. A Telugu version of the film titled Luca Alias Johnny was released on the streaming service Aha.

== Reception ==
Luca's fear of death, love, and suicide romanticism received mixed reviews from critics. Baradwaj Rangan of Film Companion South wrote "But even if Luca never becomes the Great Love Story the makers were trying for, it's an easy watch. The sensuality of the imagery has an almost tactile quality. Mere technique cannot make a movie, but it can make us believe that a movie like Luca is better than it really is."
