= Sijo Vadakkan =

Indian-American film producer

- Born: Kerala, India
- Education: Christ College, Irinjalakuda (BS); Bangalore University (MBA)
- Occupation: Real Estate Businessman
- Years active: 2006–present
- Awards: Kerala State Film Award (2023)

Sijo Vadakkan is an Indian-American real estate entrepreneur. and film producer Based in Austin, Texas, he is known for his work in Malayalam-language cinema, including the critically acclaimed film Iratta (2023), which earned him a Kerala State Film Award.

== Early life ==
Vadakkan was born in Kerala, India, and was educated at Christ College, Irinjalakuda, and Bangalore University. He moved to the United States in 2004 and settled in Austin, Texas. In the United States, Vadakkan worked in the real estate industry and founded Trinity Texas Realty and Trinity Texas Builders, which operate in the Texas residential market. He serves on the Austin chapter advisory board of the Sankara Eye Foundation’s Gift of Vision program and has been associated with the Greater Austin Malayalee Association.

== Film career ==
Vadakkan entered Malayalam film production in the early 2020s on a part-time basis. His first credited production was Madhuram (2021), a romantic drama directed by Ahammed Khabeer. The film depicts the experiences of hospital bystanders and received generally positive reviews from critics.

In 2023, Vadakkan co-produced Iratta, a psychological police procedural directed by Rohit M. G. Krishnan. The film was a critical success, noted for its screenplay and dual-role performance by Joju George. For this project, Vadakkan was a recipient of the Kerala State Film Award for Best Second Movie. Critics from The Hindu praised the film's "gut-wrenching climax," and The Times of India gave it a 4/5 rating, noting that the movie "steals your breath and leaves you with pain."

Later in 2023, Vadakkan was involved in the production of the thriller Pulimada. In 2024, he produced Pani, which marked Joju George's directorial debut. Set in Thrissur, the film received mixed to positive reviews, with critics highlighting its pacing and performance-driven narrative.

== Awards and recognition ==
- 54th Kerala State Film Awards: Best Second Movie (Iratta)
- Austin Business Journal Awards (Multiple years)
- HBA MAX Award (2015, 2017)
