= Bha Bha Ba =

2025 Indian film by Dhananjay Shankar

- Theaterical release poster
- Directed by: Dhananjay Shankar
- Written by: Fahim Safar; Noorin Shereef
- Produced by: Gokulam Gopalan; Krishnamoorthy
- Starring: Dileep; Vineeth Sreenivasan; Dhyan Sreenivasan
- Narrated by: Basil Joseph
- Cinematography: Armo
- Edited by: Ranjan Abraham
- Music by: Songs: Shaan Rahman; Score: Gopi Sundar
- Production company: Sree Gokulam Movies
- Distributed by: Dream Big Films (Kerala); Sree Gokulam Movies (Rest of India); Phars Film (Overseas)
- Release date: 18 December 2025
- Running time: 153 minutes
- Country: India
- Language: Malayalam

Bha Bha Ba (Note: The title is an acronym referring to Bhayam Bhakthi Bahumanam, which translate to fear, devotion, and respect, respectively.) is a 2025 Indian Malayalam-language political action comedy film directed by Dhananjay Shankar (in his directorial debut), written by Fahim Safar and Noorin Shereef, and produced by Gokulam Gopalan and Krishnamoorthy under Sree Gokulam Movies and Gokulam Productions. It stars an ensemble cast of Dilieep, Vineeth Sreenivasan, Dhyan Sreenivasan, Baiju Santhosh, Sandy, Balu Varghese, Saranya Ponvannan, Ashokan, Fahim Safar, Devan, Sidharth Bharathan and Redin Kingsley. Mohanlal makes an extended cameo in this film.The film also features S. J. Suryah, Salim Kumar, Riyaz Khan and Gokulam Gopalan himself appears in cameo roles.

The film was officially announced in October 2023 with a title poster. Principal photography took place between July 2024 and August 2025, primarily in Palakkad, Coimbatore, and Pollachi. The songs were composed by Shaan Rahman, background score by Gopi Sundar, and editing was handled by Ranjan Abraham.

Bha Bha Ba was released worldwide on 18 December 2025. The film received mixed to negative reviews from the critics, and failed to recoup its costs in cinemas.

== Plot ==
The film makes audiences to welcome to the world of madness.The film begins a few hours before a public speech by the Chief Minister of Kerala, C. K. Joseph. A mysterious man known only as “The Commoner” arrives at the venue in an ordinary vehicle and enters the room where party workers are resting and refreshing themselves. Blending in easily, he spends his own money at a nearby hotel to pay for food ordered by the party workers. He casually interacts with them and later buys a tender coconut drink for the Chief Minister.

During his first public speech after being declared Chief Minister, Joseph suddenly experiences severe abdominal discomfort caused by the drink given by the Commoner. Instead of admitting that he urgently needs to use the restroom, party members claim that the Chief Minister is suffering from chest pain and insist that he be rushed to the hospital. At that moment, the Commoner and a few party workers arrive in an Ambassador car and take Joseph inside. While on the way, the Commoner suddenly kicks the party workers out of the car and drives off, successfully kidnapping the Chief Minister.

A Special Investigation Team (SIT) is formed under Commissioner Dev G., assisted by ACP Ashkar Ahammed and Noble, son of Joseph and an officer of the National Efficiency Agency (NEA) from Chennai. Soon after, Mahi, a blind accomplice of the Commoner, surrenders himself to the authorities after presenting them with his own image as proof of involvement. Meanwhile, the Commoner, along with Vaavamani, takes Joseph to a secret hideout.

At the hideout, the kidnappers initiate an unusual campaign. They ask the public to write letters describing their grievances and place them in a designated vehicle so the Chief Minister can personally see the problems faced by ordinary citizens. They argue that politicians only listen to people during elections. The public responds enthusiastically, filling the vehicle with thousands of letters.

Historian Sivankutty later informs Noble that the kidnappers are deliberately trying to gain public sympathy and support. He then turns himself in as another accomplice of the Commoner. During interrogation, Mahi, Sivankutty, and another accomplice named Sijo reveal a shocking truth: ACP Ashkar is secretly part of the Commoner's gang.

When the kidnappers attempt to retrieve the vehicle filled with public letters, the police launch a chase. During the pursuit, Ashkar openly joins the Commoner, revealing that he is actually the Commoner's close childhood friend. Together with their ally DJ Torpedo, the Commoner and Ashkar overpower the police forces sent to capture them, humiliating both the government and the police department.

Noble later learns about the Commoner's past through Godson Ancharakandy. The Commoner had been orphaned at a young age and suffered severe psychological trauma, which led to him being admitted to a mental hospital. After escaping, he fell under the influence of the notorious gangster “Ghilli” Bala, eventually becoming his trusted right-hand man. Together they began intercepting illegal gold and weapon smuggling operations run by the Oscar Brothers, reselling the seized goods and amassing great wealth and power. Eventually Bala stepped away from the criminal world, leaving the Commoner in charge.

As the investigation intensifies, Noble discovers that the Commoner communicates with the public through a group of local boys known as the “Thalapathy Boys.” Attempts to interrogate them are repeatedly blocked by the cunning lawyer Advocate Mukundan Unni. Meanwhile, Dr. Frederick D’Souza reveals that the Commoner suffers from a severe psychological condition that causes him to react extremely when emotionally disturbed. Using this information, Noble tracks down Ashkar and eventually captures Vaavamani and Madhu, a media personality who publicly criticizes the police investigation while secretly boosting the Commoner's popularity through his television channel.

Through Ashkar, Noble also learns about an elaborate plan by the Commoner to attack a police station using a group of elderly men in order to rescue his captured allies. However, the plan fails when Noble kills Mahi during the attempted escape.The conflict escalates further when the Black Force locates the Commoner's hideout and launches a massive pursuit operation. With Joseph still held captive, the Commoner wages war against the forces using an armored combat vehicle supplied by Ghilli Bala. Bala himself joins the fight alongside the Commoner deep within the forest.

In the final confrontation, the Commoner reveals the true reason behind the kidnapping. Years earlier, during the funeral of the Commoner's mother, Joseph had made humiliating and lewd remarks about her. Later, at one of Joseph's legislative assembly victory rallies, he prevented the Commoner's father from receiving urgent medical help, which ultimately led to the father's death. At both moments, Joseph wore a disturbing grin that haunted the Commoner throughout his childhood. The Commoner's ultimate goal is not simply revenge, but to wipe that grin from Joseph's face forever.

Although Noble eventually rescues his father, the Commoner succeeds in exposing Joseph's corruption through secret files released by Godson. Joseph's reputation and career are destroyed, and the smug grin finally disappears from his face. In doing so, the Commoner fulfills his father's wish that he one day become a powerful and influential figure. Before disappearing, he warns Noble that he will one day seek revenge for Mahi's death.

In a post-credits scene, the Commoner is revealed to be Ram Damodar, also known as “Radarr.” While in custody, he is readmitted to the same mental hospital where he once lived. There, assassins sent by the Oscar Brothers attempt to kill him, but Ghilli Bala intervenes and saves him. Furious, one of the Oscar Brothers vows revenge against both Bala and Radarr.

== Cast ==
- Dilieep as Ram "Radarr" Damodar / “The Commoner”
  - Drupad Krishna as young Ram Damodar
- Mohanlal as "Ghilli" Bala, a powerful gangster (extended cameo)
- Vineeth Sreenivasan as Noble Joseph, an National Efficiency Agency (NEA) officer; Joseph's son
- Dhyan Sreenivasan as Godson Ancharakandy / “Interview Star”
- Baiju Santhosh as C. K. Joseph, Chief Minister of the state and leader of Common Voice Party (CVP)
- Sandy as ACP Ashkar Ahammed IPS
- Balu Varghese as Mahi
- Saranya Ponvannan as Vaavamani
- Ashokan as Sivankutty, a Historian
- Sidharth Bharathan as Damodaran, Ram's father
- Salim Kumar as Adv. Mukundan Unni
- Redin Kingsley as Yogi
- Maniyanpilla Raju as Ravindran Thillenkery, Leader of the Opposition in the Kerala Legislative Assembly
- Biju Pappan as Jayan, Bala's right-hand-man
- Devan as City Police Commissioner Dev G. IPS
- Riyaz Khan as DJ Torpedo / Chanchalan, Ram's ally
- Fahim Safar as Sijo
- Senthil Krishna as Madhu Balachandran, Senior News Editor of Universal News Network (UNN)
- Shaju Sreedhar as Mohandas Pillai, District Collector of Parashuramapuram
- G. Suresh Kumar as Home Minister of Kerala
- Vijay Menon as Dr. Fredrick D’Souza
- Noby Marcose as Chittilamchery Nandu, a CVP supporter
- Shameer Khan as Constable Shekhar
- Noorin Shereef as Nita Joseph, Joseph's daughter
- Gibin Gopinath as Peethambaran, Assistant sub-inspector of police
- Poojappura Radhakrishnan as Radhakrishnan, Ravindran's secretary
- Aswath Lal as Deepu, Godson's sidekick
- Veenah Nair as Uma Joseph, Joseph's wife and Noble's mother
- Zhinz Shan as Joseph's secretary
- Adithyan Chadrashekar as Joseph's personal assistant
- Lanka Lakshmi as Ram's mother
- Dhanasree Sudhakaran as Raveena Noble, Noble's wife
- Aswin Vijayan as Sanal, a CVP supporter
- Pramod Veliyanad as mental hospital security guard
- Abhijith Suryakiran as a Police Officer
- Ullas Pandalam as mental hospital security guard
- Nandu Poduval as toilet watcher
- Sreejith Pokkan as school headmaster
- Dilli Babu as Williams, Oscar Brothers’ henchmen
- Krishnan Nambiar as DGP, Kerala Police

=== Cameo appearances ===
- S. J. Suryah as Oscar, one among Oscar Brothers, Bala's rival gang
- Gokulam Gopalan as Bala's Aashaan

Additionally, Basil Joseph narrates the events of the film.

== Production ==
=== Development ===
In August 2023, it was reported that the couple Fahim Safar and Noorin Shereef would be debuting as screenwriters for a film directed by debutant Dhananjay Shankar and produced by Sree Gokulam Movies. It took two years to complete the screenplay. Early reports suggested that Pranav Mohanlal would play the lead role. However, on 27 October 2023, coinciding with actor Dileep's 56th birthday, the makers officially announced the film with a title poster featuring Dileep in the lead role. The title is an acronym for Bhayam, Bhakthi, Bahumanam (Fear, devotion, respect). Later, in an interview with Red FM in June 2025, Shereef stated that the project was originally conceived with Pranav in the lead, but the screenplay was reworked after Dileep joined the film.

=== Casting ===
In addition to Dileep, brothers Vineeth Sreenivasan and Dhyan Sreenivasan were cast in major roles. Dhananjay Shankar had previously worked as an assistant and associate director to both Vineeth and Dhyan on their directorial films. On 5 July 2024, dance choreographer and actor Sandy was announced as part of the cast. In the following days, Saranya Ponvannan, Sidharth Bharathan, Balu Varghese, Redin Kingsley, Baiju Santhosh, Ashokan, and Maniyanpilla Raju were confirmed in pivotal roles.

In December 2024, The New Indian Express reported that Mohanlal would appear in a cameo role as part of a two-film deal with Sree Gokulam Movies, the other project being a film directed by Jithu Madhavan. His involvement was subsequently confirmed by Dileep at an event in February 2025.

=== Filming ===
Principal photography commenced with an inaugural puja ceremony on 14 July 2024 in Palakkad. Multiple plotlines claiming to represent the film's story circulated on social media; however, the production team dismissed them as false rumours. The film was primarily shot in Coimbatore, Pollachi, Kochi, and Perumbavoor, with the first schedule wrapping up on 25 August 2024. The film's music is composed by Shaan Rahman, background score done by Gopi Sundar, with Armo handling cinematography, and Ranjan Abraham serving as the editor. The second schedule of filming commenced in late December 2024 and continued for over 45 working days, concluding on 7 February 2025. The entire shoot was wrapped by 20 August 2025.

== Soundtrack ==
The film's songs were composed by Shaan Rahman and background score by Gopi Sundar. The first single, "Azhinjattam", was released on 15 December 2025. The second single "Sreeyayi", sung by K. S. Chithra, was released on 27 December 2025. The full soundtrack album, including the film's teaser theme (composed by Shaan Rahman) and trailer theme (composed by Gopi Sundar), was released on 16 December 2025. The full background score album was released on 7 January 2026.

=== Music ===
Bha Bha Ba

Soundtrack album by Shaan Rahman
- Released: 15 December 2025 - 27 December 2025
- Genre: Feature film soundtrack
- Length: 7m 44s
- Label: Sree Gokulam Movies

No.	Title	Lyrics	Singer(s)	Length
1.	"Azhinjattam"	Vinayak Sasikumar	M. G. Sreekumar, Vineeth Sreenivasan, Niranj Suresh	4:05
2.	"Sreeyayi"	Kaithapram Damodaran Namboothiri	K. S. Chithra	3:39
Total length:				7:44

=== Background Score ===
Bha Bha Ba

Soundtrack album by Gopi Sundar
- Released: 6 January 2026
- Recorded: 2025
- Studios: Sunsa Digital Workstation, Kochi
- Genre: Feature film score
- Length: 1:21:42
- Label: Sree Gokulam Movies

No.	Title	Length
1.	"Power Adi"	2:18
2.	"No More Cringe"	2:13
3.	"Ghilli Bala: The Rough & Tough"	2:52
4.	"Paazhirulilaake Thiranje"	2:20
5.	"Paazhirulilaake Thiranje – Reprise"	2:39
6.	"Hanuman Gear"	4:59
7.	"World Of Madness"	0:56
8.	"Thalapathy Nagar"	0:40
9.	"Thalapathy Boys"	0:44
10.	"Birth Of A Hero"	1:31
11.	"The Throne Is Mine"	1:18
12.	"Varavelppu"	1:13
13.	"The Quiet Chaos"	0:32
14.	"Saviour Or Shadow"	0:37
15.	"Joseph's Homecoming"	1:50
16.	"Emergency Protocol"	0:58
17.	"Runway Cleared"	1:48
18.	"NEA From Chennai"	1:26
19.	"Thantha Vibe"	0:37
20.	"The Composite Artist"	1:57
21.	"The Historian"	1:25
22.	"Nanduettan Theme"	0:52
23.	"Madness Anthem"	1:45
24.	"Power Of Public"	1:22
25.	"Bus Stand Chaos"	1:23
26.	"The Cringe Flashback"	2:18
27.	"Santa's Mixtape"	0:51
28.	"Torpedo"	0:31
29.	"The Interval Punch"	1:31
30.	"Naayakante Padayottam"	1:01
31.	"Dark Hours"	0:39
32.	"Adv. Mukundan Unni Original"	0:30
33.	"The GK Connect"	1:52
34.	"Godson Ancharakandy"	1:44
35.	"Lalithambika"	0:50
36.	"Not So Colorful Past"	1:43
37.	"Mahi's World"	0:24
38.	"The Initial Kick"	0:44
39.	"Madness In Motion"	0:44
40.	"First Money Kick"	0:28
41.	"The Real OG"	2:15
42.	"White Cloth, Epic Soul"	0:38
43.	"Tribute To The Roads They Ruled"	1:31
44.	"Tradition In Turmoil"	0:26
45.	"The Mundu Swag"	0:45
46.	"Pan Indian Swapnam"	2:20
47.	"Bhayam Bhakthi Bahumanam"	2:40
48.	"Noble On The Run"	2:18
49.	"Smile Into Silence"	3:48
50.	"The Ultimate Kick"	5:51
51.	"DJ World Rising"	3:03
52.	"Oscar Bros Vs. Ghilli Bros"	0:46
Total length:		1:21:42

== Release ==
=== Theatrical ===
Bha Bha Ba was released worldwide in theatres on 18 December 2025. Phars Film handled overseas distribution of the film.

=== Home media ===
The post theatrical digital streaming rights of the film is acquired by ZEE5. The film began streaming on the platform from 16 January 2026 in Malayalam, Tamil, Telugu and Kannada languages.

== Reception ==
=== Critical response ===
Bha Bha Ba received mixed reviews from critics and audiences. The Indian Express rated the film 1.5 out of 5, calling it overindulgent despite its cameos and set-pieces. Mathrubhumi reported that early audience reactions were divided, with several responses highlighting Mohanlal's cameo as a major attraction while also noting uneven writing and logic.

=== Box office ===
Bha Bha Ba opened strongly at the box office following its theatrical release on 18 December 2025. Early trade estimates reported that the film earned approximately ₹14.84 crore in worldwide grossing and ₹7.5 crore in India net on its opening day due to high opening-day occupancy across Kerala and strong advance bookings, marking one of the highest opening figures for a Malayalam release in 2025. The film registered one of the top opening day totals of the year in Kerala, behind major Malayalam releases such as Empuraan and Coolie.

Subsequent daily collections showed a significant drop after the opening day, with early estimates suggesting second-day earnings of around ₹3.3–3.4crore as word-of-mouth remained mixed. The film's opening weekend four-day India net cumulative crossed ₹14.86 crore, reflecting average performance at the box office, but slowing performance across key centres.

== Controversy ==
Shortly after its release, Bha Bha Ba became the subject of online criticism over a scene that several viewers described as insensitive and inappropriate. Social media users alleged that the sequence appeared to mock the trauma related to the 2017 actress abduction and sexual assault case, in which the film's lead actor Dileep was accused and later acquitted after a lengthy trial, leading to widespread backlash.

The 2017 abduction and sexual assault case involved the high-profile kidnapping and sexual assault of a fellow Malayalam film actor while she was travelling from Thrissur to Kochi. A group of men abducted her in a vehicle, assaulted her, and recorded the attack; six of the accused were convicted in December 2025, while a Kerala sessions court acquitted Dileep of conspiracy charges, ruling that the prosecution failed to prove his involvement.
