= Feminism in Kerala =

Women's rights movements in Kerala, India

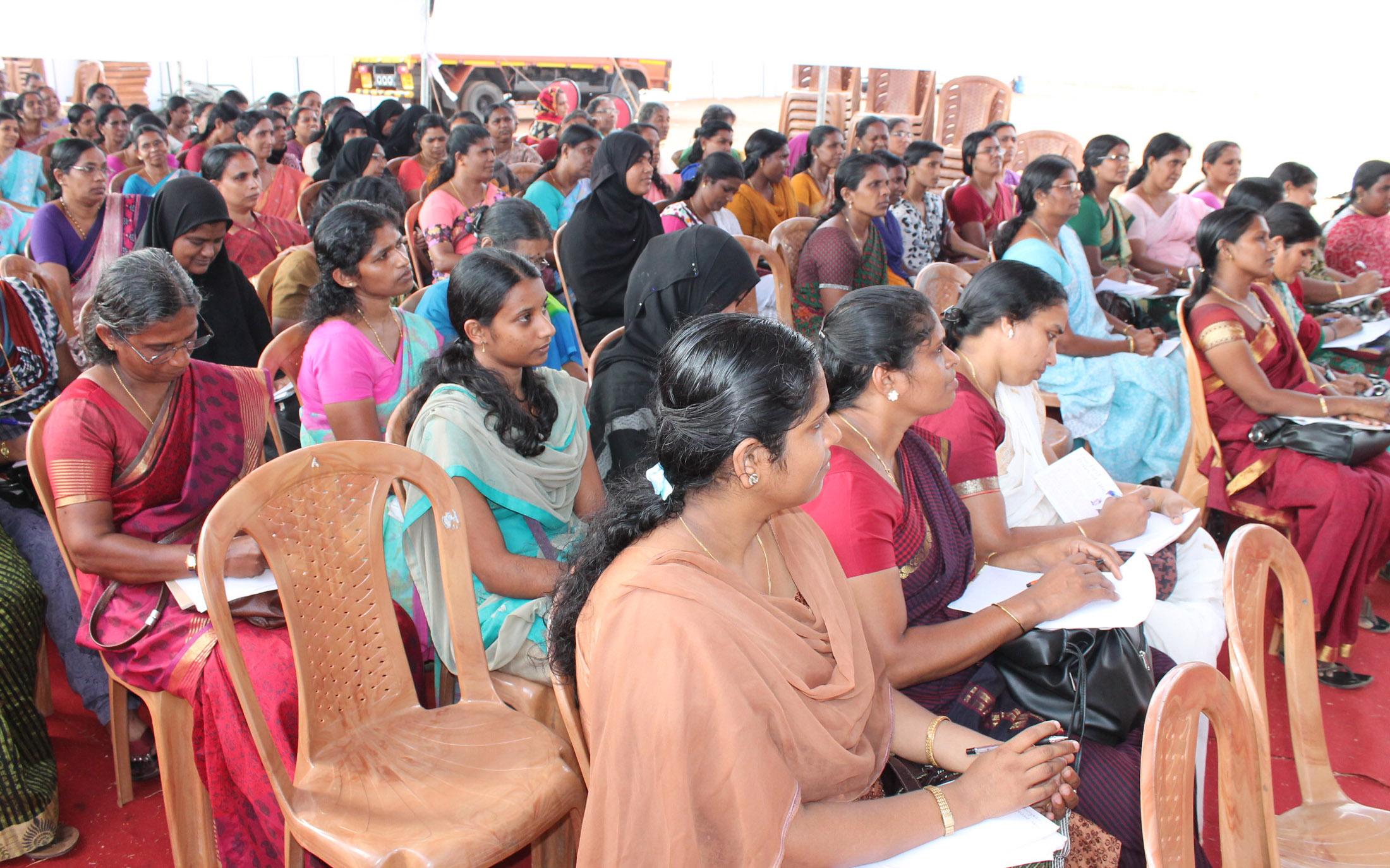
Kerala women at a public event

Feminism in Kerala covers the ideas, writings, organisations, and campaigns concerned with women's rights and gender equality in the Indian state of Kerala. In the nineteenth and early twentieth centuries, struggles over caste restrictions on women's dress, the seclusion of upper-caste women, and the reform of matrilineal and patriarchal family customs likely first opened public debate about women's place in society. Kerala is often cited for its high female literacy, favourable sex ratio, and low fertility, yet feminist scholars argue that these gains in health and education have not translated into economic autonomy, political power, or freedom from patriarchal control, a tension sometimes called the state's gender paradox.

From the 1980s an autonomous women's movements grew apart from the political parties, and later campaigns took up moral policing, women's temple entry, workplace conditions, and sexual harassment in the Malayalam film industry.

== Historical background ==
=== Matriliny and family reform ===
Several communities in Kerala, most prominently the Nairs, followed Marumakkattayam, a matrilineal system in which descent and property passed through the female line and children belonged to the mother's household. Women were central to inheritance, but day-to-day authority over property and the joint family, the tharavad, rested with the senior male, the karnavan. Historians caution against reading the system as female rule, since women's autonomy within it was limited.

Matriliny was dismantled through colonial and post-independence legislation, including the Madras Marumakkathayam Act of 1933 and finally the Kerala Joint Hindu Family System (Abolition) Act of 1975, which converted joint holdings into individual ownership. Feminist historians have argued that the shift to patrilineal nuclear households did not simply modernise the family but helped entrench a new domestic patriarchy in which the husband and father became the head of the home.

=== Caste, the body, and the Channar revolt ===
In the kingdom of Travancore, dress marked caste, and women of several lower-caste communities were forbidden from covering their upper bodies in the presence of upper-caste people. The Channar revolt (Channar Lahala), which ran through the first half of the nineteenth century and is dated by many accounts from 1813 to 1859, was a prolonged struggle by Nadar women for the right to wear an upper cloth to cover the breasts. Many of the women who first claimed this right had converted to Christianity, and their defiance drew violent attacks. A royal proclamation issued in Travancore in 1859 lifted the restriction, and the revolt is now remembered as an early assertion of women's dignity and bodily autonomy in the region.

== Early feminism ==
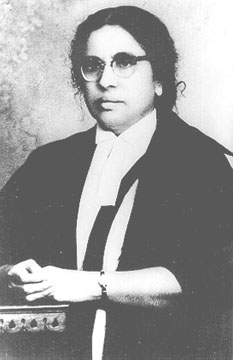
Anna Chandy was the first female High court judge in India

The late nineteenth and early twentieth centuries saw reform within caste communities that reshaped women's lives. Among the Nambudiri Brahmins, women, called antharjanam ("those inside"), were kept in strict seclusion, married as children to much older men, forbidden education, and denied remarriage as widows. Reform bodies such as the Yogakshema Sabha and its women's wing campaigned against these customs, and V. T. Bhattathiripad's 1929 play Adukkalayil Ninnu Arangathekku ("From the Kitchen to the Stage") became a rallying point against the seclusion of Namboodiri women.

Lalithambika Antharjanam (1909–1987), herself born into a Namboodiri household, wrote stories and the novel Agnisakshi that exposed the confinement of women of her community; the novel won the Sahitya Akademi Award in 1977. Her contemporary K. Saraswathi Amma wrote sharply satirical fiction attacking the assumptions of a male-ordered society.

Anna Chandy (1905–1996) is often described as a first-generation feminist of Kerala. In 1930 she founded and edited Shrimati, among the earliest women's magazines in Malayalam, in which she argued for women's rights to education, employment, and public life. She was appointed a munsiff in Travancore in 1937, making her one of the first women judges in India, and in 1959 she joined the Kerala High Court as the first woman judge of a high court in the country. The historian J. Devika later collected and translated the writings of women of this period in Her Self: Early Writings on Gender by Malayalee Women, 1898–1938.

Women also took part in the nationalist movement, among them Ammu Swaminathan, who helped found the Women's India Association and campaigned against child marriage and for women's suffrage.

== Women in the left movement ==
Women joined the peasant and communist struggles that transformed twentieth-century Kerala, and the organised left placed the "woman question" within its wider fight over caste and class. K. R. Gouri Amma drafted key land-reform legislation and became a long-serving minister. The former Naxalite K. Ajitha took part in the armed left movement of the late 1960s before turning to feminist organising.

Feminist writers have argued that the left's framing subordinated gender to class and treated women mainly as workers and mothers rather than as autonomous individuals, so that the celebrated Kerala model of social development delivered schooling and health care to women without dismantling patriarchal authority at home.

== The autonomous women's movement ==
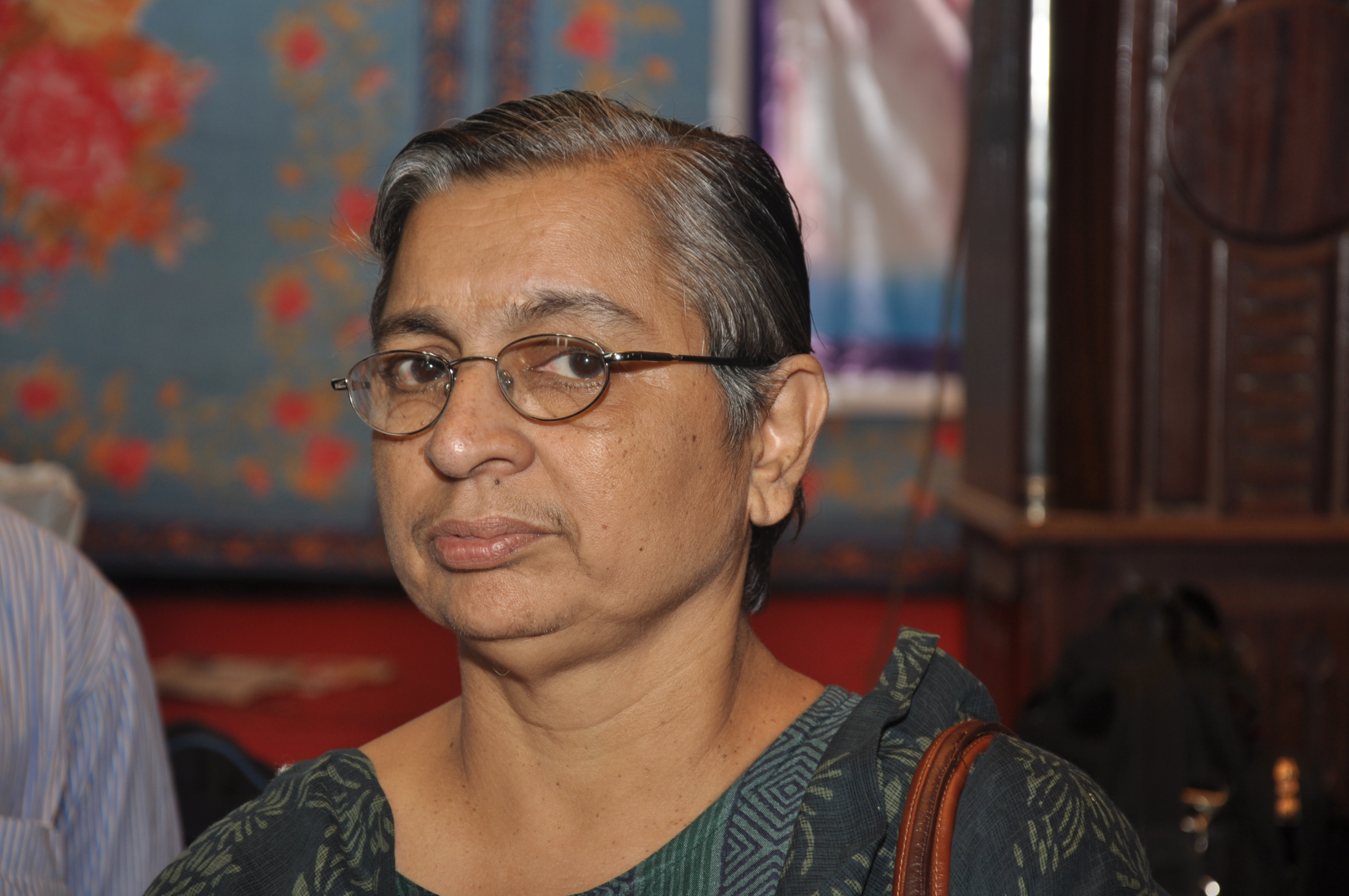
K Ajitha is a feminist activist in Kerala

From the early 1980s small collectives of women who identified explicitly as feminists began to organise independently of the political parties, marking the start of an autonomous women's movement in Kerala. These groups campaigned against dowry, domestic violence, and sexual assault, and took up individual cases of violence against women that the mainstream parties were slow to address.

K. Ajitha opened the women's counselling centre Anweshi in Kozhikode in 1993, and it grew into a prominent women's organisation, running a shelter and supporting survivors of violence. Women writers formed literary forums such as Manushi, founded by the novelist Sarah Joseph, to promote women's writing, or penezhuthu.

== Gender and the Kerala model ==
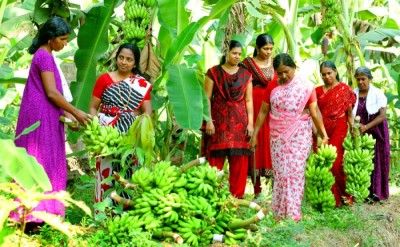
Women doing collective farming as a part of the Kudumbasree initiative

Kerala's development record is unusual for India: at the 2011 census female literacy stood at about 92 percent, the sex ratio favoured women at roughly 1,084 women per 1,000 men, and fertility and maternal mortality were low. Female labour force participation, however, has stayed low, reported at around 30 percent in the late 2010s, and many educated women remain outside paid work or move into informal jobs. Scholars describe this gap between women's capabilities and their access to paid work, property, and political office as the central puzzle of gender in the state.

The state's poverty-eradication network Kudumbashree, launched in 1998, organises millions of women into neighbourhood self-help groups and micro-enterprises and has been credited with drawing women into public and economic life. J. Devika has argued that Kudumbashree is double-edged, since it both mobilises women and leans on their unpaid or low-paid labour in ways that fit a wider "Kerala model woman" expected to serve family and community.

== Labour and the right to sit ==
In the retail sector, saleswomen in textile and jewellery showrooms were required to remain standing throughout long shifts. The collective Penkoottu and the Asanghadita Mekhala Thozhilali Union in Kozhikode organised an irrippu samaram, or right-to-sit agitation, after established trade unions declined to take up the issue. The campaign led to the Kerala Shops and Commercial Establishments (Amendment) Act of 2018, whose Section 21B requires employers to provide seating so that workers are not kept on their feet throughout the day.

== Body, morality, and public space ==
Attempts by self-appointed moral guardians to police women's dress and public conduct have repeatedly drawn feminist protest. After a vigilante group vandalised a café in Kozhikode in 2014 over reports of a couple's public affection, activists organised the Kiss of Love demonstration at Marine Drive in Kochi on 2 November 2014, in which participants kissed in public to protest moral policing. The event drew counter-protests and police action, and inspired similar demonstrations in other Indian cities.

== Religion and the Sabarimala campaign ==
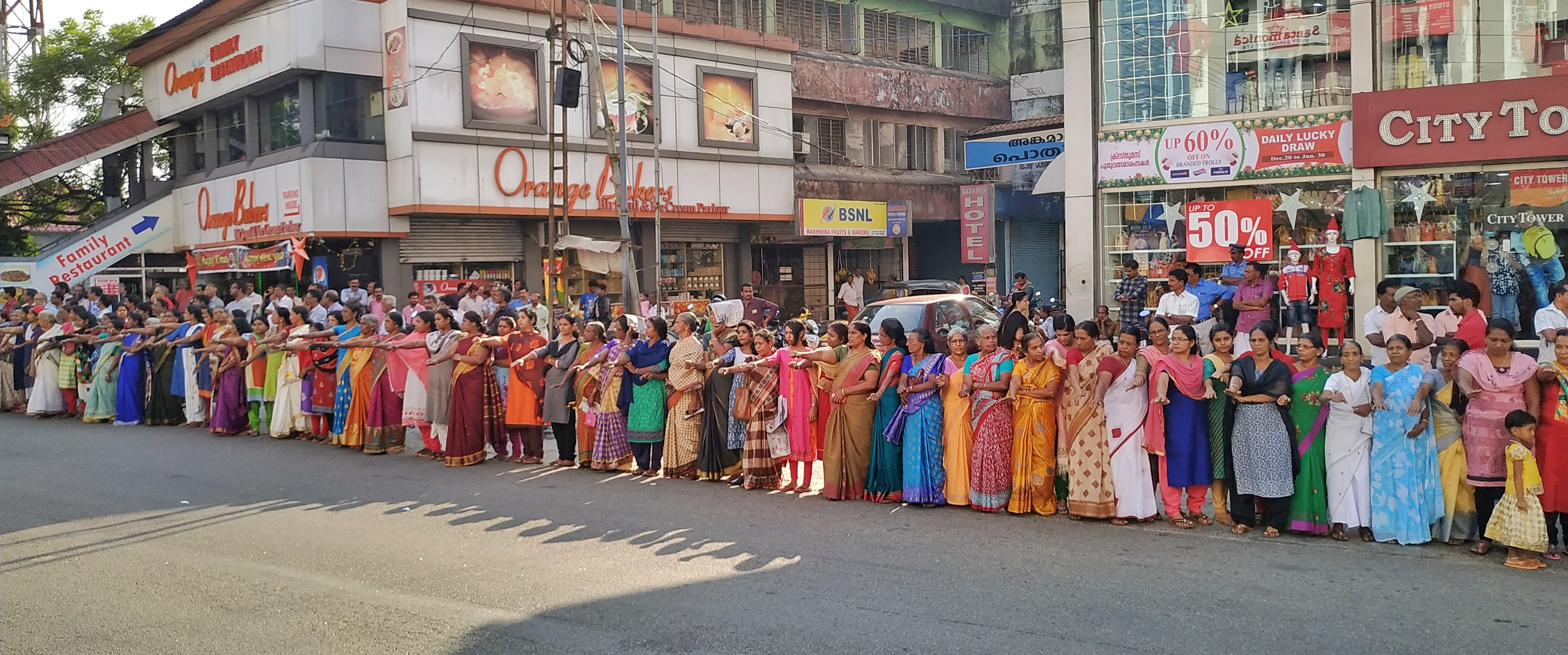
Vanitha Mathil (Women's Wall) at Angamaly, Kerala

The Sabarimala temple long barred women of menstruating age, conventionally those between ten and fifty. On 28 September 2018 the Supreme Court of India ruled by a 4–1 majority that the exclusion was unconstitutional and that women of all ages could enter. The verdict split the state. On 1 January 2019 the state government backed a Vanitha Mathil (Women's Wall) said to stretch some 620 kilometres across Kerala, in which millions of women lined up to affirm gender equality. The next day Bindu Ammini and Kanaka Durga became the first women in decades to reach the shrine, prompting protests from groups opposed to their entry.

== Feminism in cinema ==
Women in the Malayalam film industry organised the Women in Cinema Collective (WCC) in November 2017, after a leading actress was abducted and sexually assaulted earlier that year. At the collective's request the Kerala government appointed the Hema Committee, headed by the former High Court judge K. Hema, to study the conditions faced by women in the industry. The committee submitted its report in December 2019, but it was released to the public only in August 2024. The report described numerous forms of exploitation and named an informal power group that controlled who could work in Malayalam cinema, and its publication set off resignations and criminal complaints across the industry.

== Feminist thought and writing ==
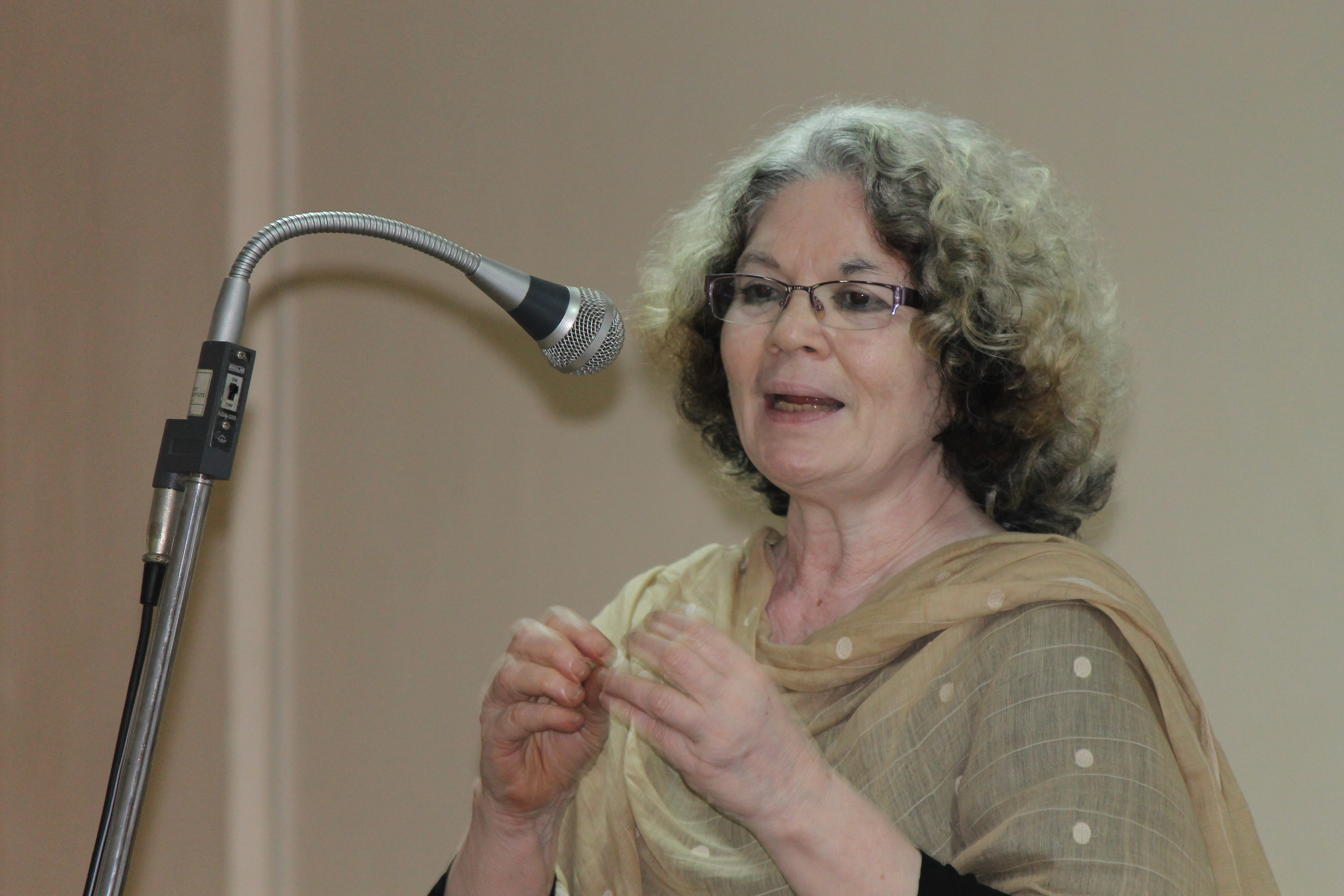
Writer and feminist Sarah Joseph

Malayalam literature has been a central arena for feminist ideas in Kerala, from the early fiction of Lalithambika Antharjanam and K. Saraswathi Amma to the work of Madhavikutty and Sarah Joseph, whose novels and the penezhuthu movement placed women's experience at the centre of writing. Among contemporary scholars, J. Devika, a historian at the Centre for Development Studies in Thiruvananthapuram, has written extensively on the gendered history of the state, including the study Kulastreeyum Chanthapennum Undayathengane? and an introduction to feminist theory in Malayalam.

== See also ==
- Women in India
- Feminism in India
