= Four Years =

Four Years or 4 Years may refer to:

- 4 Years (film), a 2022 Indian Malayalam-language film
- "Four Years", a song by Jon McLaughlin from OK Now
- "Four Years", a song by The Story So Far from Under Soil and Dirt
- Four Years, the original title of Australian TV series Four Years Later
- Olympiad, period of four years associated with the Olympic Games of the Ancient Greeks

== See also ==
- Four year plan, a series of economic measures initiated by Adolf Hitler in Nazi Germany in 1936
