= Ifthi =

Indian composer (born 1983)

Ifthikarali Azeez
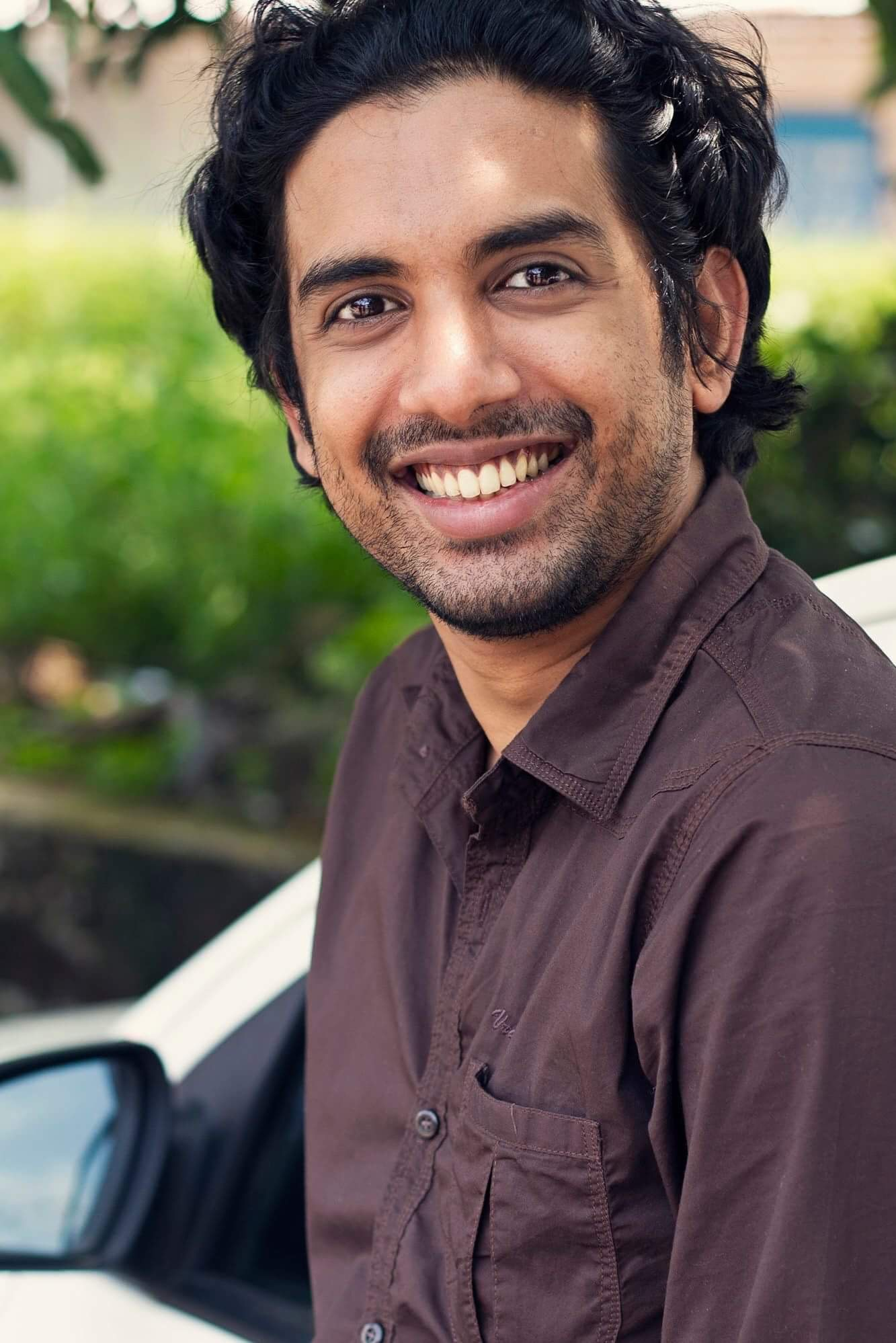

Background information
- Born: Ifthikarali Azeez; 17 August 1983 (age 43)
- Origin: Trikaripur, Kerala, India
- Occupations: Film composer, music director, singer
- Years active: 2000–present
- Website: www.ifthi.com

Ifthikarali Azeez (born 17 August 1983) is an Indian composer from Kasargod, Kerala who debuted on the 2019 Malayalam movie June.

== Career ==
Ifthi was born at Trikaripur in Kasaragod district, Kerala. He released his album 'Dil Hai Deewana' in the year 2000 while still in 10th grade of secondary school. His album 'Mantra' was released in 2005. Ifthi released his first international musical project ‘Patchwork’ in 2012, which brought together 29 artists and 49 technicians from nine nations across the globe.

He debuted as a feature film composer with the Malayalam movie June by Friday Film House.

== Discography ==
Year	Title	Language	Type
2000	Dil Hai Deewana	Hindi, Malayalam	Album
2005	Mantra	Malayalam	Album
2012	That Moment	Hindi	Single
2012	Patchwork	Hindi, English	Album
2014	The Wait	Hindi, Tamil	Single
2013	D Company	Malayalam	Film (Theme Music)
2019	June	Malayalam	Film
2021	Insha Allah	Malayalam	Film
2023	Enkilum Chandrike	Malayalam	Film
