= Big Brother (2020 film) =

2020 film by Siddique Ismail

- Theatrical release poster
- Directed by: Siddique
- Written by: Siddique
- Produced by: Siddique; Jenso Jose; Philipose K. Joseph; Manu Maliackal; Vaishak Rajan
- Starring: Mohanlal; Arbaaz Khan; Anoop Menon; Siddique; Honey Rose; Vishnu Unnikrishnan; Sarjano Khalid; Mirnaa Menon; Tini Tom; Chetan Hansraj
- Cinematography: Jithu Damodar
- Edited by: K. R. Gourishankar
- Music by: Deepak Dev
- Production companies: S Talkies; Shaman International; Vaishaka Cinemas; Carnival Movie Network
- Distributed by: S Talkies; Carnival Movie Network
- Release date: 16 January 2020
- Running time: 163 minutes
- Country: India
- Language: Malayalam
- Budget: ₹28 crore
- Box office: ₹7.03-8 crore

Big Brother is a 2020 Indian Malayalam-language action thriller film written, directed, and co-produced by Siddique (in his last film before his death). It was jointly produced by S Talkies, Shaman International, and Vaishaka Cinema, in association with Carnival Movie Network. The film stars Mohanlal in the title role, along with an ensemble cast of Arbaaz Khan, Anoop Menon, Vishnu Unnikrishnan, Sarjano Khalid, Honey Rose, Mirnaa Menon, Chetan Hansraj, Irshad, Gaadha, Siddique, Dinesh Panicker, Tini Tom, Devan and John Vijay in supporting cast. Big Brother marks Arbaaz Khan and Mirnaa Menon is the debut appearance in Malayalam cinema. The songs and background score for the film was composed by Deepak Dev.

The film began principal photography in July 2019 and was completed in December. It was shot extensively in Bangalore, and the remaining in Mysore, Mangalore, Ernakulam, and Coimbatore. The film was released theatrically in 16 January 2020 to mixed reviews from critics and was a box office bomb.

== Plot ==
Sachidanandan is released from prison, where he receives a letter from his brother, who tells him that a surprise awaits him. While travelling, Sachi remembers his past. Sachi's father was about to remarry and Sachi was excited about getting a new mother. He noticed that the mother had a son who was going to be his step-brother named Vishnu. He tries to befriend Vishnu, but he rejects him and later on starts accepting him. His step-mother is also going to have a new baby. Once after returning from a function Sachi, witnesses his step-mother being harassed by her ex-husband and tries to take away Vishnu.

Sachi kills the man while saving his brother and mother. He goes to a juvenile home for his crime, where he befriends Khan, Ghani and Pareekkar. One day, Sachi witnesses Khan and Ghani getting beaten up by a ruthless cop, Sachi kills the officer while trying to save his friends and hence goes to a central prison as he is an adult. He is sentenced to two life term sentences. In the prison, he discovers his night vision. As Sachi exits the prison, he is well received by his younger brother Manu, who was born after he went to prison. He was also received by his prison friends Pareekkar, Khan and Ghani. They invite Sachi to join them to work with Edwin Moses, who is a mysterious drug lord.

Sachi warns them and decides to lead a peaceful life with his family. The surprise awaiting him was that Vishnu, who is now a Dr. is set to marry his colleague Vandana and that the marriage was postponed so that Sachi can witness the marriage as Vishnu was adamant. The marriage takes place, and as Vandana seeks Sachi's blessings, she realizes that he was the one who saved her from a gang and in the process of saving her, Sachi's back was scratched by a aruva. The next day, Vandana forces Sachi to tell the truth about him. When the cops learned that Sachi could see in the dark, he and many other prisoners were sent for commando operations.

They were often sent unarmed to face armed opponents. Sachi's prison term was extended as every time he went for the operation, the report written was that he used to escape from prison. Many prisoners never returned. Their bodies were found in random places. A police officer named Vedantham approaches Sachi, and explains that the drug syndicate has returned stronger as ever, and it is controlled by a person named Edwin Moses, whose identity is unknown to anyone. Vedantham tells Sachi that innocent people are used for the drug business without their knowledge. Sachi rejects it, saying that he wants to live peacefully with his family.

Sachi and his family face many troubles from Edwin Moses and his partner Shetty. Later, Shetty explains to Sachi that Edwin is doing all this for a drug container worth crores which is in Shetty's control. Sachi finds his friends is in alliance with Edwin Moses, but reveals that they had nothing to do with it unless a gangster named Muthan died. Edwin had been pestering them for the container. It was revealed that Sachi had the container. He had stolen it from Muthan earlier. Edwin's men attack Sachi and his friends. Sachi and his friends defeat them. Vedantham arrives there and kills Edwin's men, Khan and Pareekkar, while Ghani survives.

Enraged, Sachi hits Vedhantham after which he calls Edwin Moses from Pareekkar's phone, where it is revealed that Edwin Moses was none other than Vedantham. Enraged, Sachi destroys the container in front of Vedhantham and kills him for avenging Khan & Pareekar's death. After this, Sachi repairs the old car as he reunites with his family.

== Cast ==
- Mohanlal as Sachidanandan Nair aka Sachi
  - Ahran Chaudhary as young Sachi
- Arbaaz Khan as Karnataka Police DCP Vedantham IPS / Edwin Moses (original), the main antagonist (voiceover by Vineeth)
- Anoop Menon as Dr. Vishnu Nair, Sachi's brother
- Sarjano Khalid as Manu Nair, Sachi's Brother (voiceover by Bibin George)
- Siddique as Shetty, a Bangalore-based businessman and kingpin
- Honey Rose as Dr. Vandana Menon, Vishnu's wife
- Mirnaa Menon as Arya Shetty, Shetty's daughter and Sachi's love interest (voiceover by Raveena Ravi)
- Gaadha as Gemini, Manu's love interest
- Vishnu Unnikrishnan as Ghani, Sachi's friend
  - Adish Praveen as young Ghani
- Irshad as Pareekkar, Sachi's friend
  - Master Ajas as young Pareekar
- Tini Tom as Khan, Sachi's childhood friend
  - Master Nahan as young Khan
- Chetan Hansraj as Vinayaraj / Edwin Moses (fake), Edwin's henchman and the secondary antagonist
- Devan as Karnataka Police ADGP Prathap Chandra Menon IPS, Vandana's father
- Janardhanan as Achutha Kurup, Sachi's grandfather
- Dinesh Panicker as Mohanachandran, Sachi's and Manu's biological father; Vishnu's step father
- John Vijay as Govind Raj, Edwin's henchmen
- Abu Salim as D'Souza, Shetty's bodyguard
- Asif Basra as Muthan, Edwin's negotiator
- Nirmal Palazhi as Velappan, a servant
- Kollam Sudhi as Chakrapani, a servant
- Anjali Krishna as Radhika, Sachi's stepmother
- Majeed as Kalyan Kumar, Gemini's father
- Mukundan as Jail Superintendent Rahul Nair, Mangalore Central Jail
- Appa Haja as Karthikeyan
- Shilpa Ajayan as Jammela, Gemini's sister
- Ahran Chaudhary as Karnataka Police DGP Arun Rathod IPS
- Shaju Sreedhar as Shaiju Varghese, Karnataka Home Minister's P.A

== Production ==
=== Development ===
In May 2018, Siddique revealed in an interview to The New Indian Express that his next Malayalam film is with Mohanlal and it will be released in April 2019. Later, media outlets reported that the film has been titled Big Brother.

=== Casting ===
More cast were revealed in May 2019, including Arbaaz Khan, Anoop Menon, Vishnu Unnikrishnan, Sarjano Khalid, Irshad Ali, Siddique, Janardanan, and Tini Tom in pivotal roles. Big Brother marks the Malayalam film debut of Bollywood actor Arbaaz Khan. He plays Vedandam IPS, an encounter specialist and the main villain. Mohanlal plays Sachithanandan and Anoop Menon and Sarjano Khalid portrays his younger brothers. Menon plays doctor Vishnu, according to him, Vishnu is the "nicest character" he has played so far. Regina Cassandra and Satna Titus were in talks to play the female lead roles that month. The former for the role of Arya Shetty, the daughter of a wealthy businessman and Sachithanandan's romantic interest, and the latter as the pair of Sarjano Khalid's character. Titus was confirmed in that month along with another debutante Shilpa Ajayan as the pair of Menon's character. Cassandra opted out from the film due to scheduling conflicts. She was replaced by newcomer Mirnaa Menon, whose casting took place only few days before filming. Gaadha plays one of the three female lead roles in the film, it is her first Malayalam appearance and second film after Nimir.

=== Filming ===
Principal photography began on 11 July 2019 in Ernakulam. Filming was initially scheduled to begin on 20 June 2019 with Mohanlal joining on 1 July after finishing his work in Ittymaani: Made in China. The film was mostly shot at Bangalore with a few scenes at Kochi. Mohanlal was filming scenes in Kochi in September. In October, filming took place near the HMT factory in Bangalore. The team were also shooting in Mysore in that month. Lalitha Mahal palace was a filming location. The film was to be shot at the streets of Mysore but heavy downpour caused delay and filming was restricted to indoor sequences. Final schedule of filming resumed in mid-November. Final schedule took place in places such as Ernakulam and Coimbatore. Mirnaa had 100 days shoot. Filming was completed in December 2019, taking longer than expected. The budget also hiked to ₹32 crore. The stunts were choreographed by Supreme Sundar and Stunt Silva, and the songs were choreographed by Brinda, Dinesh, and Prasanna Sujit.

== Music ==
Big Brother

Soundtrack album by Deepak Dev
- Released: 21 December 2019
- Recorded: 2019
- Venues: Kochi, Mumbai
- Studios: Dev's Wonderland; A. T. Studios
- Genre: Feature film soundtrack
- Length: 12:53
- Language: Malayalam
- Label: Millennium Audios

The film features a background score and three original songs composed by Deepak Dev, with lyrics by Rafeeq Ahamed and Santhosh Varma. The audio launch function of the film was held at Darbar Hall Ground, Ernakulam on 26 December 2019. The soundtrack album was released by the label Millennium Audios on 21 December 2019.

Big Brother (Original Motion Picture Soundtrack)
No.	Title	Lyrics	Singer(s)	Length
1.	"Kando Kando"	Rafeeq Ahammed	Amit Trivedi; Gowry Lekshmi	4:04
2.	"Oru Dinam"	Rafeeq Ahammed	Anand Bhaskar	4:19
3.	"Kalamanodishtam"	Santhosh Varma	M. G. Sreekumar; Bindu Anirudhan	4:26
Total length:				12:53

== Release ==
=== Theatrical ===
Big Brother was released worldwide on 16 January 2020 and opened to mixed reviews from critics.

=== Home media ===
The satellite and digital rights of the film were sold to Surya TV and Amazon Prime Video. The film is also dubbed in Hindi and released on YouTube in May 2021, which received more than 15 million views in nine days.

== Reception ==
=== Critical reception ===
Sanjith Sidhardhan of The Times of India rated the film 2.5/5 stars and wrote, "If Siddique could have kept the run-time in check and maybe stopped short of building Sachidanandan as a superhero, the movie could have passed as a decent watch."

Fahmi Muhammed of The Week rated the film 2.5/5 stars and wrote, "Big Brother is not the best creation to emerge under the 'Siddique' brand. The film is completely different from the usual Siddique movies which have an equal mix of humour, romance and action."

Sowmya Rajendran of The News Minute wrote, "The plot is obvious and the big revelation, which comes following fight after fight, has been staring at the audiences for ages.

Anasooya of Mathrubhumi wrote, "As Big Brother is a thriller in the background of a family story, the director makes a keen attempt to attract all types of audience."

S. R. Praveen of The Hindu wrote, "Absurd dialogues, unfunny attempts at humour and a twist the audience sees coming from a mile away all contribute towards the demise of this Siddique directorial".

Litty Simon of Onmanorama criticised the storyline, narrative, cinematography, and overuse of slow motion, video editing, excessive characters and soundtracks. She wrote, "Big Brother is only for Mohanlal fans who love to watch him in larger-than-life roles.

Sajin Shrijith of The New Indian Express rated 1.5/5 stars and wrote, "It was only recently that we got another Malayalam film with ‘brother’ in its title. Big Brother, just like that film, has an unpleasant flashback for one of its main characters and seems to have been similarly built around twists and not the other way around. Though it doesn't aim to depress its viewers with gruesome sequences like that film did, it is nevertheless a largely flat and frustrating experience."

Manoj Kumar R. of The Indian Express rated the film 1/5 stars and wrote, "It takes a seasoned and indisputable talent like Mohanlal to even muster some reactions and perform with a straight face in the presence of Arbaaz Khan."

Anna M. M. Vetticad of Firstpost rated the film 0.25/5 stars and wrote, "For a film that is supposed to be a thriller, Big Brother offers zero excitement after the initial fleeting suspense over how the hero once used his extraordinary gift for an extraordinary purpose. There is absolutely nothing by which to recommend Siddique's Big Brother."
