= Adhyarathri =

2019 Malayalam language comedy film

- Theatrical release poster
- Directed by: Jibu Jacob
- Written by: Sharis Mohammed; Jebin Joseph Antony
- Produced by: Central Pictures
- Starring: Biju Menon; Anaswara Rajan; Manoj Guinness; Aju Varghese; Sarjano Khalid
- Cinematography: Sadhik Kabeer
- Edited by: E. S. Sooraj
- Music by: Bijibal
- Production company: Central Pictures
- Distributed by: Central Pictures
- Release date: 4 October 2019
- Running time: 129 minutes
- Country: India
- Language: Malayalam

Adhyarathri (transl. First Night) is a 2019 Indian Malayalam-language comedy film directed by Jibu Jacob, written by Sharis Mohammed and Jebin Joseph Anthony, produced and distributed by Central Pictures. The film stars Biju Menon as a marriage broker, along with Manoj Guinness, Anaswara Rajan in dual roles as a daughter and mother, Aju Varghese and Sarjano Khalid in pivotal roles. The film was released on 25 October 2019 coinciding on the occasion of the Diwali fest.

== Plot ==
The film tells the story of the all-consuming Manoharan in a village called Mullakkara in Kuttanadu, surrounded by a lake. Manoharan, who had been running for everything in the country since ancient times, had to be a wedding broker in a special situation twenty-two years ago. The humiliation of the loss of his sister Anitha at the wedding, and the grief of their father's heart attack, have made Manoharan lose to Tresiamma, his rival. Ever since Manoharan became a broker, no couple has fled from Mullakara.

In the meantime, he is given the task to marry off his deceased girlfriend Shalini's daughter, Aswathi. Aswathi is also the granddaughter of a teacher couple who looked after her just like her parents. He confirms Aswathi's marriage with Kunjumon, a small local businessman. However, the story takes a twist when Manoharan learns that Aswathi had fallen in love with a boy named Sathya from her college in Bangalore. Later, Manoharan meets Anitha in Bangalore and she says that the word of the bride is the last and final word for a marriage and that it's Aswathi's right to marry whomever she wants. Manoharan understands that Aswathi loves Sathya dearly and he agrees to help her marry Sathya and takes her back to Mullakara. He also tells her not to tell anybody that she loves Sathya. Aswathi meets Kunjumon there and he confesses that his love for her had begun in childhood. Unable to tell to him about Sathya, Aswathi tries to find ways to call off the wedding. Aswathi has a childhood friend and she is her best friend.

Meanwhile, Kunjumon receives a letter from a well wisher stating that Aswathi loves another person and that it is for good that he should leave Aswathi. He ignores the warnings and proceeds with the preparations of his marriage. Sathya arrives at Mullakara and takes up a position as a teacher in a tutorial college.

Later Kunjumon finds himself jealous as Aswathi spends more time with Sathya than Kunjumon. Feeling angry, Kunjumon decides to confront her on their wedding eve, only to get knocked into Aswathi's best friend. He tells her about how Aswathi ignores him. Then the best friend reveals that she had been in love with him since childhood but hadn't spoken about it as his marriage had been fixed. Shocked, Kunjumon leaves.

The next day, the wedding is cancelled as Kunjumon is missing. Manoharan tells Aswathi's grandparents that they can marry her to Sathya. They agree to it and Sathya is presented as the groom. However, before the wedding could take place, Tresiamma comes and tells everyone about how she found out that Sathya was originally chosen for Aswathi so that he may get a handsome commission. Aswathi later tells everybody that she loved Sathya and wished to marry him. The wedding takes place and Kunjumon is found to be married to Aswathi's best friend.

== Cast ==
- Biju Menon as Manoharan Mullakkara
  - Giriprasad Damodar as Young Manoharan
- Manoj Guinness as Kunjatta P Kumaran
  - Althaf Manaf as Young Kunjatta
- Aju Varghese as Kunjumon Puthenpurakkal
- Anaswara Rajan in a dual role as:
  - Aswathy Ramachandran (Daughter), Manoharan's adopted daughter
  - Shalini Ramachandran (Mother), Manoharan's girlfriend
- Anu Sithara as Anitha, Manoharan's sister
- Sarjano Khalid as Sathya
- Vijayaraghavan as Narayanan Maash
- Sreelakshmi as Sharada
- Biju Sopanam as Satheesh
  - Aswin Jose as Young Satheesh
- Veena Nair as Shyama Satheesh
  - Della George as Young Shyama
- Sneha Babu as Satheesh's and Shyama's daughter
- Pauly Valsan as Thresiyamma
- Shobha Singh as Kamala
- Kollam Sudhi as Sudhi, Kunjumon's assistant
- Jayan Cherthala as Kumaran, Manoharan's father
- Nandhu Pothuval as Attukal Ramakrishnan
- Chembil Ashokan as Sudhakaran, Shyama's father
- Vinod Kedamangalam as Jose
- Prasad Muhamma as Ambrose
- Naseer Sankranthi
- Shiny T. Rajan as Kunjumon's mother
- Jithan V Soubhagom as Bengaluru college student
- Mahadevan Mahi as Tutorial Student 1
- Vineeth Sreenivasan as Narrator

== Production ==
The film marks the second collaboration of Biju Menon and Jacob after Vellimoonga. Anaswara Rajan plays dual roles in this movie for the first time in her career.

== Soundtrack ==
Adhyarathri

Soundtrack album by Bijibal
- Released: 24 September 2019
- Recorded: 2019
- Studio: Bodhi
- Genre: Feature film soundtrack
- Language: Malayalam
- Label: Manorama Music

The music of the film was composed by Bijibal while lyrics were written by Santhosh Varma and B. Ajithkumar.

Track listing
No.	Title	Lyrics	Singer(s)	Length
1.	"Njanennum Kinavu"	Santhosh Varma	Ann Amie, Ranjith Jayaraman	3:36
2.	"Onavillane"	D B Ajithkumar	Najim Arshad	3:38

== Release ==
The film was released theatrically on 4 October 2019.

=== Box office ===
The film grossed approximately ₹4.45 crore in its first week run in Kerala. In the overseas opening weekend, it grossed $141,123 in the United Arab Emirates, US$14,202 (₹10.11 lakh) in the United States, US$1,560 (₹1.12 lakh) in Canada, A$371 (₹17,835) in Australia, and NZ$3,910 (₹1.78 lakh) in New Zealand. In three weeks, it grossed US$22,713 (₹16.07 lakh) in the US and A$3,569 (₹1.73 lakh) in Australia.
