= Madhuram =

2021 Indian film

- Official Movie Poster
- Directed by: Ahammed Khabeer
- Screenplay by: Ashiq Aimar; Fahim Safar
- Story by: Ahammed Khabeer
- Produced by: Joju George; Sijo Vadakkan
- Starring: Joju George; Shruti Ramachandran; Arjun Ashokan; Nikhila Vimal
- Cinematography: Jithin Stanislaus
- Edited by: Mahesh Bhuvanend
- Music by: Songs: Hesham Abdul Wahab; Govind Vasantha; Score: Govind Vasantha
- Production company: Appu Pathu Pappu Production House
- Distributed by: SonyLIV
- Release date: 24 December 2021
- Running time: 122 minutes
- Country: India
- Language: Malayalam

Madhuram (transl. Sweet) is a 2021 Indian Malayalam-language romantic drama film directed by Ahammed Khabeer and written by Ashiq Aimar and Fahim Safar based on a story by Khabeer. The film was produced by Joju George and Sijo Vadakkan. The film stars Joju, Shruti Ramachandran, Nikhila Vimal, Arjun Ashokan, and Indrans in important roles. The music was composed by Hesham Abdul Wahab and Govind Vasantha (one song).

The film was released digitally through SonyLIV on 24 December 2021 and received positive reviews.

== Plot ==
The movie mainly focuses on Sabu and Kevin, the two bystanders at Kochi Medical College Hospital. Sabu waits for his wife Chitra's recovery and Kevin for his mother's surgery. The friendship between the two and other bystanders, the stories shared by each of them, and how they give strength and support to each other to recover from the problems they face in life become the premise of the movie.

== Cast ==
- Joju George as Sabu
- Arjun Ashokan as Kevin
- Shruti Ramachandran as Chitra
- Nikhila Vimal as Cherry
- Indrans as Ravi
- Jaffar Idukki as Kunjikka
- Jagadish as Kevin's father
- Lal as Doctor Rajah
- Fahim Safar as Thajudeen
- Navas Vallikkunnu as Vishnu
- Malavika Sreenath as Neethu
- Babu Jose as Chandran
- Thirumala Ramachandran as the Security
- Sminu Sijo as Kevin's mother (photo presence only)
- Amrutha as Hospital reception staff nurse

== Production ==
The film marks the second directional of Ahammed Khabeer after the movie June. The director actually announced another movie, Insha Allah starring Joju George as his second directional. The movie was postponed due to COVID-19 protocols and was planned to be made before Insha Allah. Ahammed Khabeer announced the movie on 17 December 2020, through his social media accounts. The shooting of the movie began on 18 December 2020, after the pooja ceremony. Government Medical College Kochi, Fort Kochi, and Arjun Ashokan's house were the main shooting locations. The shooting was wrapped up on 22 February 2021. Editing, sound recording, dubbing and other post-production works ended on 2 August 2021.

Jithin Stanislaus, the cinematographer of the film June did the cinematography in the film. The editing was done by Mahesh Bhuvanend. Ashiq Amir and Fahim Safar worked on the movie's script. Sameera Saneesh arranged the costumes and Ronnex Xavier handled the makeup.

The official teaser of the film starring Joju George and Shruti Ramachandran was released on 14 February 2021 which promised that the film will be a romantic drama. The trailer was released on 10 December 2021. The second trailer was released on 22 December 2021 in which the release date was announced.

== Music ==
Hesham Abdul Wahab and Govind Vasantha composed the songs of the movie. Govind Vasantha arranged the background score. Vinayak Sasikumar and Sharfu penned the lyrics.

Song title	Singer(s)	Music director	Lyricist	Ref.
"Ganamee"	Sooraj Santhosh; Nithya Maammen	Hesham Abdul Wahab	Vinayak Sasikumar	
"Parimitha Neram"	Pradeep Kumar; Avani Malhar	Govind Vasantha	Sharfu	
"Rum Pum Pum"	Arya Dhayal	Hesham Abdul Wahab	Vinayak Sasikumar	
"Aadam Paadam"	Vineeth Sreenivasan	Hesham Abdul Wahab	Vinayak Sasikumar	
"Enthinanu Enthinanu"	Hesham Abdul Wahab	Hesham Abdul Wahab	Vinayak Sasikumar	

== Reception ==
The News Minute wrote that, "Ahammed Khabeer's story is about hospital bystanders, which he has directed with beautiful visuals, especially of the food. Joju George with the help of the unfailing Indrans and a talented crew of younger actors, gives us a cosy ride with Madhuram." Anasooya of Mathrubhumi News said that, "Madhuram is all about beautiful and sweet love stories. The film has lots of emotional moments that touches our heart. Joju George requires a special mention for his excellent performance. Music and framing used in the movie are also good." Asianet News wrote that, "Madhuram' is a beautiful film that lives up to the expectations of the audience when the director arrives for his next film after June."

Sify rated the movie with 3.5 on 5 and wrote that, "Madhuram has its spectacular moments, which makes this a genuine effort. Joju George shines way ahead of the rest, with a stellar show. His chemistry with Shruti Ramachandran is so good." Baradwaj Rangan of Film Companion wrote that, "Madhuram is a set of love stories as sweet as the title. The film is so evenly made without getting too sugary or sentimental and that is the secret of the movie's success."
