= Gowry Lekshmi =

- Born: 2 August 1993 (age 33)
- Genres: World music; alternative rock; ambient rock
- Occupations: Composer; singer; songwriter; music producer
- Years active: 2006 – present

Gowry Lekshmi (born 2 August 1993) is an Indian composer, singer, songwriter, and music producer from Cherthala, Kerala.

== Early life ==
Gowry Lekshmi was born and raised at Cherthala in the Alappuzha district of Kerala. She was educated at St. Mary of Leuca School in Cherthala. She did her B.A. in music at RLV College of Music and Fine Arts, Thrippunithura. She then pursued her M.A. in music from Kerala University.

== Career ==
Gowry Lekshmi began her film career at the age of 13 by composing a song for the Malayalam film Casanovva. Director Rosshan Andrrews, who liked her song "Sakhiye", used it in his Mohanlal-starrer Casanova that came out in 2012. She was only 13 when she composed the song. The song was used in the movie when she was 15. As the youngest composer in India, Gowry's work was much appreciated and got wide media coverage then. Gowry is a holder of the Performer's Certificate from Trinity College London.

Gowry made her debut as a playback singer for music director Prasanth Pillai in the film Ezhu Sundara Rathrikal, followed by the song "Kalam Padunne" for Rex Vijayan in the film Lord Livingstone 7000 Kandi. Since then she has sung in a number of films in Malayalam and Tamil. Her breakthrough as a singer came when she sang the song "Aaro Nenjil" in the Malayalam film Godha.

In 2015, Gowry produced her debut independent music video titled Thoni, which was also her first single, written, composed and sung by herself. It received positive response.

Gowry Lekshmi is crowdfunding her new video, a new initiative in Malayalam indie music Aararo.

== Discography ==
=== Films ===
Year	Song	Album	Credit	Notes
2012	"Sakhiye"	Casanovva	Composer; Singer; Songwriter	
2013	"Vande Madaram"	Kunthapura	Composer	
2014	"Ithu Jeevitham"	Ezhu Sundara Rathrikal	Singer	
2015	"Aayiram Kaalamai"	Lord Livingstone 7000 Kandi	Singer	
2016	"Sollava"	Bongu	Singer	Tamil song
2016	"Kaalai Theneer"	Ennodu Vilayadu	Singer	Tamil song
2017	"Aaro Nenjil"; "Aaro Nenjil (Desi Mix)"	Godha	Singer	
2017	"Pattam Pole"	Puthan Panam	Singer	
2017	"Unnai Edhirparthen"	Bayama Irukku	Singer	Tamil song
2017	"Sunnath Kalyanam"	Aana Alaralodalaral	Singer	
2018	"Athmavin Akashathil"	Njan Prakashan	Singer	
2019	"Uyarum"	June	Singer	
2019	"Ini Vida Parayaam"	Zam Zam	Singer	
2019	"Aalolam"	Love Action Drama	Singer	
2019	"Sayya"	Neeya 2	Singer	Tamil song
2019	"Ganesa"	Raja Bheema	Singer	Tamil song
2019	"Thirinjum Marinjum"	Ishq	Composer; Singer; Songwriter	
2019	"Kanda Kanda"	Valiyaperunnal	Singer	
2020	"Kando Kando"	Big Brother	Singer	
