= Kerala Crime Files =

- Genre: Crime drama Police procedural
- Created by: Ahammed Khabeer
- Written by: Ashiq Aimar (Season 1); Bahul Ramesh (Season 2)
- Directed by: Ahammed Khabeer
- Starring: Aju Varghese; Lal
- Music by: Hesham Abdul Wahab
- Country of origin: India
- Original language: Malayalam
- No. of seasons: 2
- No. of episodes: 12

Production
- Producers: Rahul Riji Nair (Season 1); Ahammed Khabeer; Jithin Stanislaus; Hassan Rasheed (Season 2)
- Cinematography: Jithin Stanislaus
- Editor: Mahesh Bhuvanend
- Camera setup: Single-camera
- Running time: 30 minutes
- Production companies: First Print Studios (Season 1); Monkey Business (Season 2)

Original release
- Network: JioHotstar
- Release: 23 June 2023 – present

Kerala Crime Files is an Indian Malayalam-language crime drama streaming television series directed by Ahammed Khabeer and written by Ashiq Aimar starring Aju Varghese and Lal in lead roles. The series was released on JioHotstar. The first season Kerala Crime Files - Shiju, Parayil Veedu, Neendakara was released on 23 June 2023. The second season Kerala Crime Files 2 - The Search for CPO Ambili Raju released on 20 June 2025. The second season serves as the second installment of Bahul Ramesh's Animal Trilogy preceded by Kishkindha Kaandam (2024) and followed by Eko (2025). The third season of the series is in development.

== Plot ==
=== Season 1 ===
A team of six policemen led by Sub-Inspector Manoj is on a chase to solve a murder in a suburban lodge room, with just one clue - a fake address, Shiju, Parayil Veedu, Neendakara, from a lodge register.

This story takes place in 2011. It all begins when the receptionist at a local lodge discovers the dead body of a sex worker in one of the rooms. Circle Inspector Kurian Avaran (Lal) and Sub-inspector Manoj Sreedharan (Aju Varghese) from the Ernakulam North Police Station lead a team of five police officers who are determined to catch the person responsible. But their only clues are a name, "Shiju," and a fake address, "Parayil Veedu, Neendakara," given by the suspect at the lodge.

=== Season 2 ===
Set in 2024, the second season follows SI Noble, who is newly assigned to a remote police station at Kaniyarvila in rural Thiruvananthapuram. He was accompanied by Inspector/SHO Kurian Avaran and team. His first case takes a mysterious turn when a civil police officer (CPO), Ambili Raju, suddenly goes missing shortly after being transferred under suspicious circumstances linked to his questionable associations. As Noble investigates further, the case widens in scope, uncovering secrets about Ambili's behaviour towards public and his hold. The series unravels the mystery behind Ambili Raju's disappearance while highlighting how Noble and his team navigate through layers of hidden truths to bring justice.

== Cast ==
=== Main Cast (Season 1 & 2) ===
- Aju Varghese as SI (Season 1) / Inspector (Season 2) Manoj Sreedharan
- Lal as CI (Note: CI stands for Circle Inspector of Police.) (Season1) / Inspector (Note: It stands for Inspector of Police and Station House Officer.) (Season 2) Kurian Avaran
- Navas Vallikkunnu as CPO Sunil (Note: CPO stands for Civil Police Officer, a designation used for constables working in local police.)
- Sanju Sanichen as CPO (Season 1) / SI (Season 2) Vinu
- Zhinz Shan as SCPO Pradeep (Note: SCPO stands for Senior Civil Police Officer.)

=== Season 1 ===
- Sreejith Mahadevan as Shiju
- Ansal Ben as Union Shiju
- Aji Alok as Karim Ikka
- Ashwathy Manohar as Athira
- Devaki Rajendran as Lathika
- Rooth P. John as Swapna
- Harishankar as Sarath
- Jeevan Baby Mathew as Afzal
- Dr. Nidhinya Anil as WCPO Sindhu
- Stijo Chemmessery as Tea Shop Owner
- Prabhakumar as ACP
- Abin Paul as Eloor SI
- Pradeep Joseph as Edappally SI
- Akhil Raj as Neendakara A.S.I.
- Roopesh KV as Venjaramoode SI
- Pragesh Raj as Palarivattom SI
- Jinu Anilkumar as CCTV Officer
- Madanan Babu as Athira's father
- Rajeev Thomas as Athul
- MD Rajmohan as Old Husband
- Mini S.K. as Old Wife
- Abhilash K. as BSNL Officer
- Akshay T. as Sainu
- Anoop Raghavan as Ashraf
- Ponnachan as Party Secretary
- Vinod Thomas as Biju
- Jose Praveen as Peter
- Prem Prakash as Devassy
- Baiju Bala as Jacob
- Feby as Sisily

=== Season 2 ===
- Arjun Radhakrishnan as SI Noble
- Indrans as CPO Ambili Raju
- Harisree Ashokan as Ayyappan
- Renjith Shekhar as CPO Praveen Chandran
- Noorin Shereef as Stephy
- Fara Shibla as Dr. Raveena
- Jeo Baby as Aashraya Incharge
- S. P. Sreekumar as Prasannan
- Binu Dev as Aji Vellayani
- Suresh Kumar as ASI Shaju
- Ramesh Menon as Sudhi
- Prashanth Madhavan as Reji
- Nitheesh as Ernakulam Central Inspector
- G.Sabu as Advocate Dineshan
- Sudheer Babu as CPO Subash
- Sanosh Murali as CPO Justin
- Saji Thulasidas as Jose
- Harish as SP Thiruvananthapuram Rural
- Bilas Nair as DYSP Murali Krishnan
- Gopan Ramachandran as Dileesh
- Rishikesh as Photographer
- Sona Abraham as Dr. Celin
- Sirajudheen Nazar as Jaismon
- Rahul Shanmughan as Jaismon's
- Jijoy Rajagopal as Babu K9 squad incharge
- Manjusree as Rema
- Soorya S Kurup as Chandra
- Ancy as Vijila
- Shibu as Prasannan's Brother In Law
- Amrutha as Sunil's wife
- Raya Fathima as Sunil's daughter

Dogs

- Simba as Terry
- Mask as CCTV Dog
- Honey as Tippu
- Jo as Roby

== Episodes ==
Season	Episodes	Originally released
1	6	June 23, 2023
2	6	June 20, 2025

=== Season 1 ===
No. overall	No. in season	Title	Directed by	Written by	Original release date
1	1	"Crime Scene"	Ahammed Khabeer	Ashiq Aimar	23 June 2023
Swapna, a sex worker, is found dead in a lodge in Kochi. Inspector SHO Kurian and Sub Inspector Manoj of Eranakulam North Police Station begins investigation.
2	2	"Mahazar"	Ahammed Khabeer	Ashiq Aimar	23 June 2023
The police officers learns that only the Receptionist have seen the culprit. With the help of Receptionist, Investigation team tries to sketch the culprit.
3	3	"Detection"	Ahammed Khabeer	Ashiq Aimar	23 June 2023
Swapna’s roommate, Lathika, reveals about the meeting of Shiju. The S.I Manoj connects dot after she tells about the cruelty of Shiju
4	4	"Findings"	Ahammed Khabeer	Ashiq Aimar	23 June 2023
The Police strengthen their search for the culprit. They searches every lodges in Kochi after finding out Shiju have practice of meeting sex workers in such places
5	5	"Evidence"	Ahammed Khabeer	Ashiq Aimar	23 June 2023
The investigators learn more about Shiju from various places he had worked on. They root out to explore Shiju’s path
6	6	"Charge Sheet"	Ahammed Khabeer	Ashiq Aimar	23 June 2023
Kurian, Manoj and their team had been chasing Shiju for 6 days, but how can a man hide if his love is genuine.

=== Season 2 ===
No. overall	No. in season	Title	Directed by	Written by	Original release date
7	1	"Shuffle in the Capital"	Ahammed Khabeer	Bahul Ramesh	20 June 2025
A sudden police department shake-up sets the stage of an unexpected convergence of officers Kurian, Noble and Ambili Raju, but Ambili goes missing.
8	2	"Ambili-Ayyappan Puzzle"	Ahammed Khabeer	Bahul Ramesh	20 June 2025
As they dug deeper into Ambili's life, an bizarre connection to an ex-convict, Ayyappan, emerges and raise more questions than answers.
9	3	"Crossing Borders"	Ahammed Khabeer	Bahul Ramesh	20 June 2025
Clues from Thiruvananthapuram and a mysterious incident in Ernakulam involving CI Manoj connect, forming a Jigsaw puzzle for Noble to assemble
10	4	"Noble's Instinct"	Ahammed Khabeer	Bahul Ramesh	20 June 2025
With Manoj's warm support, Nobles's unorthodox approach proves pivotal as he follows his instincts to connect the dots and uncover a crucial lead.
11	5	"Back to Square One"	Ahammed Khabeer	Bahul Ramesh	20 June 2025
New revelations about Ayyappan send Noble and whole team full circle, linking back to the mysterious incidents at the dogs retirement shelter.
12	6	"Noble's Stadium Theory"	Ahammed Khabeer	Bahul Ramesh	20 June 2025
With theories aligning but witnesses lacking, Noble is driven to validate his Central Stadium theory, which he’s deeply invested in.

== Production ==
=== Season 1 ===
Principal photography for the first season of Kerala Crime Files was conducted in multiple locations of Kerala primarily in Kochi, Kollam and Kottayam. The series was directed by Ahammed Khabeer and produced under the banner of First Print Studios by Rahul Riji Nair. Filming was completed in early 2023, and the series premiered on Disney+ Hotstar on 23 June 2023.

=== Season 2 ===
The production of the second season commenced on 19 February 2024. It is directed and produced by Ahammed Khabeer under the banner of Monkey Business, the season had its first shooting schedule in Thiruvananthapuram, Kerala. Cinematography was handled by Bahul Ramesh, who also served as the writer. The entire shoot wrapped up on 29 April 2024 after nearly two months of filming including several other locations like Kochi, Thrissur, Wayanad, Coimbatore etc. Post-production work was completed by August 2024, with the series set for a mid 2025 release on Disney+ Hotstar. The trailer of the season was released on 28 May 2025 and the season was released on 20 June 2025.

== Reception ==
=== Season 1 ===
Kerala Crime Files Season 1 received generally positive reviews from critics.

The New Indian Express gave the series a rating of 3.5 out of 5, praising its detailed procedural narrative and long-format storytelling. The Hindu described the show as an "engaging slow-burn police procedural" and praised the performances of Aju Varghese and Lal. South First appreciated its six-episode structure and engaging moments. India Today described it as "well-written and engaging", noting its balance of investigation and character depth. The Week rated 3.5/5 and highlighted its realistic portrayal of policing and its balance between professional and personal lives. The Indian Express rated 3.5 out of 5 stars noted it as a "tightly-woven police procedural", marking a milestone in Malayalam OTT content. OTTPlay rated 3.5 out of 5 stars and wrote "Aju Varghese’s police procedural marks an engaging Malayalam entry into web series arena". The Daily Jagran reviewed as "A Well-Crafted And Heart-Pounding Malayalam Thriller".

=== Season 2 ===
The second season of Kerala Crime Files also received critical acclaim upon its premiere.

The Indian Express rated 3.5 out of 5 stars and praised its gripping procedural narrative, well-crafted screenplay, outstanding performances, realistic police investigation and technical finesse. Times Now rated 3.5 out of 5 stars and lauded as "Subtle Yet Powerful Sequel That Stays True To The Original While Digging Deeper". The Week rated 4 out of 5 stars and appreciated it as best crime series in Malayalam. Onmanorama reviewed the season as a "A smart, subtle thriller that keeps hooked". The Hindu called the season as a "An intriguing sequel that improves upon the original". OTTPlay rated 3.5 out of 5 stars and described the sequel as a "a fitting testament to its genre". The Times of India praised the sequel as a "must-watch", highlighting its gripping narrative, emotional depth, and strong performances by Harisree Ashokan, Indrans, and Arjun Radhakrishnan. The review also appreciated the improved technical quality compared to the first season.

== Future ==
In June 2025, director Ahammed Khabeer stated in an interview with OTTPlay that a third season of Kerala Crime Files was under consideration but would not begin soon due to his commitments to other film projects, including a film featuring Tamil actor Arjun Das in his Malayalam debut. On 9 December 2025, JioHotstar officially announced the third season. Khabeer later clarified that writing and planning for the series would commence only after the completion of his upcoming film, with writer Bahul Ramesh also yet to begin work on the project.
