= Sarjano Khalid =

Indian actor

- Born: Nadapuram, Kozhikode, Kerala, India
- Occupation: Actor
- Years active: 2018 – present

Sarjano Khalid is an Indian actor who mostly appears in Malayalam and Tamil films. He is known for June (2019), Adhyarathri (2019), Big Brother (2020), and Cobra (2022).

== Career ==
Khalid made his film entry through Nonsense (2018). He joined the sets to learn about the aspects of film making and only appeared in a couple of scenes. His next film was Adhyarathri playing opposite Anaswara Rajan. Khalid's first lead role was in the film June with Rajisha Vijayan and several newcomers. In December 2019, he played a role in the Gautam Menon web series Queen, which marked his television debut. In 2020, he played Mohanlal's younger brother in the film Big Brother. His next film was R. Ajay Gnanamuthu's Cobra. The film is marked as his Tamil debut.

== Personal life ==
His father Khalid Aboubacker is a businessman.

== Filmography ==
Key
†	Denotes films that have not yet been released

- All films are in Malayalam language unless otherwise noted.

Year	Title	Role	Notes	Ref.
2018	Nonsense	Boy at the staircase	Debut film	
2019	June	Noel	Debut as a lead	
2019	Hi Hello Kaadhal	Arjun	Short Film	
2019	Adhyarathri	Sathya		
2019	Queen	Vinith	Tamil web series	
2020	Big Brother	Manu		
2022	Cobra	Teenage Madhiazhagan "Madhi" & Kathirvelan "Kathir/Cobra"	Tamil film and Dual role	
2022	4 Years	Vishal Karunakaran		
2023	Ennivar	Anandhu		
2024	Marivillin Gopurangal	Rony		
2024	Demonte Colony 2	Samuel Richard	Tamil film	
TBA	Eravu †	Antony		

== Awards ==
Year	Award	Category	Film	Result
2020	South Indian International Movie Awards	Best Debut Actor	June	Won
