= C. J. Roy =

Indian businessman and film producer

- Born: Chiriankandath Joseph Roy; Kerala, India
- Died: 30 January 2026; Bengaluru, Karnataka, India
- Occupations: Businessman, Film producer
- Known for: Founder and Chairman of Confident Group; Malayalam and Kannada film production
- Spouse: Liny Roy
- Children: 1 son, 1 daughter

Chiriankandath Joseph Roy (died 30 January 2026), famously known as C. J. Roy, was an Indian entrepreneur, real estate developer, and film producer. He was the founder and chairman of the Confident Group, a Bengaluru-based real estate and construction company, and produced several Malayalam films. Known for his business acumen and involvement in cinema, Roy became a prominent figure in both real estate and entertainment. He was found dead in Bengaluru in January 2026 under circumstances reported as a suspected suicide.

== Early life ==
C. J. Roy was born in Kerala, India, as the son of Joseph of the Chiriankandath house. Details about his birthdate are not publicly available. He began his career in real estate and gradually expanded into business ventures, eventually founding the Confident Group, which became one of Bengaluru's notable real estate companies.

== Career ==
C. J. Roy was the founder and managing director of the Confident Group, which focused on residential and commercial real estate projects in Bengaluru and other regions. He was known for transforming fringe areas into prime real estate and expanding the group's operations internationally. He gained recognition for luxury property developments and high-profile business strategies. He was known for promoting a debt-averse business model and later diversified into hospitality, education and media.

Roy also ventured into film production under the Confident Group banner.

== Personal life and death ==
C. J. Roy was married to Liny Roy and had two children. His brother, C. J. Babu, was also involved in family business matters.

C. J. Roy was found dead on 30 January 2026 at his office in Langford Town, Bengaluru, from an apparent self-inflicted gunshot wound. The incident occurred while officials from the Income Tax Department were conducting search and seizure operations at the premises. Police registered the case as an unnatural death and stated that preliminary findings pointed to suicide. His death was widely covered in Indian media and a Special Investigation Team (SIT) was later constituted by Bengaluru police to conduct a detailed probe into the circumstances surrounding his death.

C. J. Roy was recognized for his luxurious lifestyle, including his love for high-end cars and helicopter rides. He had maintained a social media presence with a following, sharing aspects of his personal life and business ventures. Roy was also known for producing films that combined success with impact in the Malayalam film industry. His death led to media coverage in India, particularly highlighting his contributions to real estate, philanthropy, and cinema.

Roy's death triggered public debate and political reaction. His family alleged that continuous questioning and repeated raids by Income Tax officials placed him under severe mental stress in the days leading up to his death.

Several political leaders criticized the conduct of investigative agencies, calling for an independent inquiry and raising concerns about excessive pressure on business owners.

== Produced films ==
All films are in Malayalam unless otherwise noted.

| Year | Film | Notes | Ref. |
|---|---|---|---|
| 2012 | Casanovva | | |
| 2012 | Crazy Loka | Kannada film | |
| 2013 | Ladies and Gentleman | | |
| 2013 | Radhan Ganda | Kannada film | |
| 2021 | Marakkar: Lion of the Arabian Sea | | |
| 2022 | Monster | | |
| 2022 | Mei Hoom Moosa | | |
| 2025 | Identity | | |
| 2026 | Anomie | | |
