= Casanovva =

- Theatrical release poster
- Directed by: Rosshan Andrrews
- Written by: Bobby & Sanjay
- Produced by: CJ Roy; Antony Perumbavoor
- Starring: Mohanlal; Shriya Saran; Lakshmi Rai; Roma Asrani
- Cinematography: Jim Ganesh
- Edited by: Mahesh Narayanan
- Music by: Songs: Gopi Sundar; Alphons Joseph; Gowry Lekshmi Background Score: Gopi Sundar
- Production companies: Confident Group; Aashirvad Cinemas
- Distributed by: Maxlab Cinemas and Entertainments
- Release date: 26 January 2012
- Running time: 172 minutes
- Country: India
- Language: Malayalam
- Budget: ₹12 crore

Casanovva (also known as Confident Casanovva) is a 2012 Indian Malayalam-language romantic action film directed by Rosshan Andrrews and written by Bobby & Sanjay. It was produced by CJ Roy of Confident Group in association with Aashirvad Cinemas. It stars Mohanlal in the title role, along with an ensemble cast of Shriya Saran, Vikramjeet Virk, Lakshmi Rai, Roma Asrani, Sanjjana, Abhishek Vinod, Riyaz Khan, Shankar Panicker, Lalu Alex and Jagathy Sreekumar. The story follows Niranjan, an international businessman living in Europe, who secretly operates as a highly skilled vigilante hacker and crime-fighter under the alias “Casanovva.” A dangerous criminal organization is stealing priceless historical artifacts across Europe. These artifacts are linked to ancient secrets and powerful syndicates. The crimes attract the attention of Interpol, and investigations begin to track down the mysterious Casanovva—who is believed to be connected to these thefts.

The film features original soundtrack composed by Gopi Sundar, Alphons Joseph, and Gowry Lekshmi, and a film score composed by Sundar.

Produced on a budget of ₹12 crore, it was one of the most expensive Malayalam films ever made at that time. Confident Casanovva was released in India on 26 January 2012. Upon release, the film received negative reviews from critics, with criticism on the story, screenplay, cast performances and direction. However the film's music, songs, production values and technical aspects received praise. The Hindi remake rights to the film were bought by Ketan Shah for ₹15 million (US$160,000).

== Plot ==
The film is about Casanovva, a famous billionaire playboy and the owner of Casanovva's Eternal Spring, an international chain of flower boutiques. He has at his beck and call a faithful array of female followers, including his staff, friends and former girlfriends, who will do anything for him. The film starts with a robbery carried out by four criminals, and they decide on their next target in a wedding hall. They enter the wedding place as Casanovva's guests. Casanovva recognises them but allows them to attend the marriage function, having some plan in his mind. The young criminals (Alexi, Salim, Arjun, and Kiran) take some photos of their targeted rich persons and collect their details. Casanovva watches all this and does not respond at the moment.

The next day is the wedding ceremony. Casanovva, with the aid of his friend in a TV channel (without revealing his plan), plans a live telecast programme to capture the four criminals' robbery. But unfortunately, the wedding is postponed due to some unexpected reasons. Thus the robbers pull out from their plan. But within this time the TV channel people come for the telecast. Suddenly Casanovva gets an idea and announces a new live romance reality show through the channel named FALL IN LOVE. Then he creates some plans to make the two people in the robbery gang fall in love with Hanna and Ann Mary and telecast their love scenes using hidden cameras through the live reality show FALL IN LOVE. Hanna falls for one of the young robbers by hearing the words of Casanovva, who was her boss. The four robbers try to steal a sword, but casanovva (wearing a mask on his face) interrupts them and takes the sword from them. By this time, the TV show had become popular and caused some problems for Ann Mary, the robbers and even Hanna. Hanna asks her boss Casanovva what his plan was. So Casanovva reveals his flashback to Hanna.

Some years ago, Casanovva came to Dubai and romanced some girls. Zacariah, who is a magazine reporter, publishes the stories of Casanovva and him mingling with girls. Sameera Zacharia, daughter of Zachariah, helps Casanovva from a danger, and eventually they become friends. During a meeting with Casanovva on the last day of his holiday in Dubai, Sameera falls for him and believes his feelings for her are also real. But when Casanovva returns to Europe, he again starts to flirt with ladies and forgets Sameera, who is still waiting for Casanovva. Next year Casanovva again came to Dubai for holiday. This time an angry and jealous Sameera decided to make Casanovva feel the tension and pain that she had gone through the past year because of Casanovva's flirtatious life. Sameera lies to him that she has a lover, which made Casanovva jealous. Casanovva is surprised by Sameera's nature and realises that she is different from other women with whom he had relations. Gradually Casanovva understands that he has some different feelings for Sameera than for other women. He realises that he is in love with her. She also has a love interest in Casanovva. But her father requests Casanovva to leave his daughter. He replies that he was in love with his daughter. Casanovva calls Sameera for a meeting to reveal his love to her. On the day, at A Big Fair in Dubai, Sameera wears a mask to give Casanovva a surprise. But suddenly four robbers rush to the road with the same mask as Sameera. The police try to capture them. The four robbers escape, and Sameera is caught by the police. And one of the robbers shoots Sameera, and she dies at the spot. Casanovva waits for her and returns to his room depressed. On the way, he sees the four robbers escaping in a car. But at that time he had no idea about the incident that had happened. He is informed of the death of Sameera by TV news in his room. He rushes to the police to tell about the robbers. But they don't listen to Casanovva. Here ends the flashback.

He says to Hanna that the aim of the reality show was to make the robbers understand about the feeling of love. He then captures the robbers and makes them explain that Sameera was not their gang member to the public through the TV show. Thus Casanovva succeeds in showing the innocence of his lover Sameera to the public and police. Then he asks the robbers who killed Sameera. They reveal that it was nobody else but Alexi. Alexi reveals that he killed Sameera, and when she got arrested, he thought that she was one of his gang and that she would reveal their plan to the police. Soon after, revealing the truth, the police arrive at the place. Alexi runs away, and Casanova follows him. Casanovva kills Alexi with a gun, thereby avenging Sameera's death, and surrenders to the police.

== Cast ==
- Mohanlal as Casanovva
- Shriya Saran as Sameera Zacharia
- Raai Laxmi as Hannah
- Vikramjeet Virk as Alexi
- Roma Asrani as Ann Mary
- Sanjjana as Nidhi
- Abhishek Vinod as Arjun
- Arjun Nandhakumar as Kishore
- Shahid Shamzy as Saleem
- Jagathi Sreekumar as Luka
- Andria D'Souza as Mariam Thomas
- Lalu Alex as Zachariah
- Shankar Panicker as Ajay
- Riyaz Khan as Joseph
- Sagar S Nair as Super model
- Dimple Rose as Rose
- Shilpa Bala

== Production ==
The film's production was launched at Confident Cascade in Bangalore on 24 January 2009. The event was attended by film personalities including Mohanlal, Vishnuvardhan, Jagathy Sreekumar, Lalu Alex, Arya, Arshad Warsi, Lakshmi Rai, Priyanka Nair, Priyadarshan, Sibi Malayil, Suresh Kumar, P. V. Gangadharan, Antony Perumbavoor, and the film unit members.

=== Filming ===
Confident Casanovva started its shooting on 27 September 2010 and was scheduled to release in February 2011. However, the film has faced delays and its release date was postponed. The first schedule was scheduled to finish in Dubai by 12 December 2010. It has been reported that Mohanlal gave prime importance to another film, China Town, which led Casanovva to a delayed release. The second schedule has started from the last week of April 2011 in Dubai. The shooting at Dubai has ended by the first week of May 2011 and the next location was Bangkok which started shooting from 14 September. The fourth schedule started shooting from 20 October at Bangalore. The remaining song was shot in the last schedule that commenced from 12 December at Cape Town, South Africa.

== Release ==
Confident Casanovva released in theatres on 26 January 2012; 138 theatres in Kerala and 64 theatres outside Kerala making it the widest release for a Malayalam film, with simultaneous openings in Mumbai, Chennai, Bangalore and other Indian cities. The film released overseas in February 2012.

== Reception ==
=== Critical response ===
The film mainly received negative reviews from critics.

- Moviebuzz from Sify called the film as "below average" while commented that "Casanovva perhaps has some nice moments but you would need real patience to spot them".
- Nowrunning.com rated, describing the movie as a "wish-wash film".
- Rediff gave the movie and said that "Casanovva disappoints big time".
- Metromatinee.com review said "if Casanovva works even just a bit, it's because of Mohanlal".
- IndiaGlitz.com called the film as "a stylish flick" and said that "Casanovva is one film that may satisfy the fans of the star and those who like technically sound, slickly made films".
- Oneindia.in said "Even the glamorous looking babes in short and skimpy clothes could not save Casanovva from the disastrous plot of the film".

Sify and Rediff listed Casanovva #1 in their lists of Most Disappointing Malayalam Films of 2012.

=== Box office ===
The film had a large opening, collecting ₹ 2 crore, thanks to the 1,000 first-day shows, the highest ever for a Malayalam movie. However, as word of mouth spread, the collections tanked in the subsequent days. The film grossed above 8cr from worldwide box office. The movie lost around 1.8 crores of production budget.

== Soundtrack ==
Casanovva

Film score by Gopi Sundar Alphons Joseph Gowry Lekshmi
- Released: 26 January 2012
- Recorded: Sunsa Digital Work Station, Chennai
- Genre: Feature film soundtrack
- Length: 21:06
- Label: Satyam Audios
- Producer: Dr. C. J. Roy

The soundtrack features four songs composed by Gopi Sundar, Alphons Joseph and Gowry Lekshmi, with lyrics by Gireesh Puthenchery, Vayalar Sarath Chandra Varma, Gowry Lekshmi, Rosshan and Sanjay. The background score of the film has been composed by Gopi Sundar. The audio rights were acquired by Satyam Audio on a price of ₹12 million (US$130,000).

Track	Song	Artist(s)	Composer	Lyricist	Duration
1	"Omanichumma"	Karthik, Vineeth Sreenivasan, Najim Arshad, Roopa Revathi, Kalyani, Gopi Sundar	Gopi Sundar	Gireesh Puthenchery	5:11
2	"Hey Manohara"	Blaaze, Gopi Sundar, Pop Shalini, Balu Thankachan, Priya, Feji	Gopi Sundar	Blaaze, Gopi Sundar, Jelujay, Rosshan, Sanjay	3:27
3	"Sakhiye	Vijay Yesudas, Shweta	Gowry Lekshmi, Gopi Sundar	Gowry Lekshmi	3:13
4	"Kanna Neeyo	Sayanora	Alphons Joseph	Vayalar Sarath Chandra Varma	3:24
5	"Casanovva Theme Song	Mohanlal, Priya Himesh, Ranina Reddy, Gopi Sundar	Gopi Sundar		3:18
6	"Sakhiye" (Second version)	Gopi Sundar, Shweta	Gowry Lekshmi, Gopi Sundar	Gowry Lekshmi	3:13
