= Noorin Shereef =

Indian actress (born 1989)

- Born: 3 April 1999 (age 27); Kollam, Kerala, India
- Occupations: Film actor; scriptwriter
- Years active: 2016–present
- Spouse: Fahim Safar (m. 2023)
- Parents: Shereef A.R. (father); Haseena Shereef (mother)

Noorin Shereef is an Indian actress from Kollam, Kerala, who works in the Malayalam film industry.

== Career ==
She garnered notice for her leading role in Oru Adaar Love (2018) but was dissatisfied with the makers after they modified her role after Priya Prakash Varrier's viral wink.

== Filmography ==
Key
†	Denotes films that have not yet been released

=== As actor ===
Year	Title	Role	Language	Notes
2017	Ilai	Chithra	Tamil	Debut film
2017	Chunkzz	Romario's sister	Malayalam	
2019	Oru Adaar Love	Gadha John	Malayalam	
2020	Dhamaka	Dancer	Malayalam	
2020	Oollalla Oollalla	Noorin	Telugu	
2021	Vidhi	Jini	Malayalam	
2022	Santacruz	Meera Kajan	Malayalam	
2025	Bha Bha Ba	Nita Joseph	Malayalam	
2026	Velleppam	Steffy	Malayalam	
2026	Bermuda	Jayashree	Malayalam	

=== As writer ===
Year	Film	Notes
2025	Bha. Bha. Ba.	Co-written with Fahim Safar

=== Television ===
Year	Serial	Channel	Role	Notes
2016	Mangalyapattu	Mazhavil Manorama	Abhirami	
2016	Uppum Mulakum	Flowers TV	Sushmitha	
2025	Kerala Crime Files 2	Disney+ Hotstar	Steffy	Web series
