= Fahim Safar =

Indian actor and scriptwriter

- Born: 10 October 1993 (age 32); Thiruvananthapuram, Kerala, India
- Occupations: Film actor; scriptwriter
- Years active: 2016–present
- Spouse: Noorin Shereef (m. 2023)

Fahim Safar (born 10 October 1993) is an Indian actor and scriptwriter known for his work primarily in the Malayalam film industry.

== Career ==
Fahim Safar began his career as an assistant director in short films before transitioning to acting. He has also hosted celebrity chat shows on Malayalam television channels. In 2016, he played the lead role in Malayalam's first stunt music video, Kari, directed by Jagan, the son of veteran filmmaker Shaji Kailas. Since then, he has portrayed prominent roles in films such as June (2019), Pathinettam Padi (2019), Malik (2021), Thrishanku (2023), and Jackson Bazaar Youth (2023). Additionally, he co-wrote the screenplay for Madhuram (2021) and played a prominent role in the film. Hé made his writing debut through Bha Bha Ba, which is co-written with Noorin Shereef, starring Dileep.

== Personal life ==
Fahim Safar completed his primary education at St. Thomas Residential School, Thiruvananthapuram and went to National University of Advanced Legal Studies (NUALS), Kochi.

Fahim married actress Noorin Shereef on 24 July 2023.

== Filmography ==
Key
†	Denotes films that have not yet been released

=== As actor ===
Year	Film	Role	Notes
2016	Kari		Music Video
2019	June	Sankar Das / Harry Pottan	
2019	Pathinettam Padi	Ibru / Kunjikka	
2021	Malik	Asif	
2021	Madhuram	Thajudeen	
2023	Jackson Bazaar Youth	Rameshan	
2023	Thrishanku	Franko	
2024	Varshangalkku Shesham	Music Director	
2025	Bha Bha Ba	Sijo	

=== As writer ===
Year	Film	Notes
2021	Madhuram	Co-written with Ashiq Aimar
2025	Bha. Bha. Ba.	Co-written with Noorin Shereef
