= Ahammed Khabeer =

Indian film director and screenwriter

- Born: 17 February 1991 (age 35); Kottayam, Kerala, India
- Occupations: Film director, screenwriter
- Years active: 2019–present
- Notable work: June; Madhuram; Kerala Crime Files

Ahammed Khabeer is an Indian film director, screenwriter and producer who works in the Malayalam film industry. He made his directorial debut with the coming-of-age film June (2019). He is best known for directing Madhuram (2021) and the critically acclaimed Malayalam web series Kerala Crime Files on Disney+ Hotstar.

== Early life and education ==
Ahammed Khabeer was born in 1980 in Kottayam, Kerala, India. He completed his schooling at Girideepam Bethany Central School in Kottayam. He pursued an MBA in Media and Entertainment from Manipal University's Bangalore campus.

== Career ==
Before venturing into films, Khabeer worked as an assistant programme producer at the Malayalam television channel Mazhavil Manorama. He also directed a few short films during this period.

Khabeer made his directorial debut with June, a coming-of-age romantic drama starring Rajisha Vijayan in the titular role. The film also featured Joju George, Arjun Ashokan, and Aswathi Menon in supporting roles. It is produced by Vijay Babu under the banner of Friday Film House, the film was noted for its nostalgic portrayal of adolescence and youthful aspirations.

In 2021, Khabeer directed Madhuram, a drama set in a hospital that explored the emotional connections between strangers. The film starred Joju George, Arjun Ashokan, and Shruti Ramachandran, and premiered on SonyLIV. It received positive reviews for its heartwarming narrative and performances.

In 2023, Khabeer directed Kerala Crime Files – Shiju, Parayil Veedu, Neendakara, the first official Malayalam-language web series released on Disney+ Hotstar. The police procedural thriller starred Aju Varghese and Lal and was praised for its grounded narrative and realistic portrayal of police investigations.

Following the success of the first season, Khabeer returned to direct the second season of Kerala Crime Files. The production began in February 2024 and concluded in April 2024. He also produced the season under his production venture Monkey Business.

In February 2024, it was announced that Khabeer would direct a romantic comedy featuring Tamil actor Arjun Das in his Malayalam debut. The film's music will be composed by Hesham Abdul Wahab.

== Filmography ==
Key
†	Denotes films that have not yet been released

=== Films ===
Year	Title	Role	Notes	Ref.
2019	June	Director, Co-writer	Debut film co-written with Libin Varghese and Jeevan Baby Mathew	
2021	Madhuram	Director, Story		
2026	Many Many Happy Returns †	Director, Story, Producer	co-written with Jobin John Varghese and RJ Mathukutty	

=== Web series ===
Year	Title	Role	Language	Platform	Notes
2023	Kerala Crime Files	Director	Malayalam	Disney+ Hotstar	
2025	Kerala Crime Files 2	Director, Producer	Malayalam	Disney+ Hotstar	The second installment of Animal trilogy
TBA	Kerala Crime Files 3 †	Director, Producer	Malayalam	Disney+ Hotstar	
TBA	Chennai Crime Files †	Showrunner, Producer	Tamil	Disney+ Hotstar	
