= June (2019 film) =

- Theatrical release poster
- Directed by: Ahammed Khabeer
- Written by: Libin Varghese; Ahammed Khabeer; Jeevan Baby Mathew
- Produced by: Vijay Babu
- Starring: Rajisha Vijayan; Sunny Wayne; Sarjano Khalid; Arjun Ashokan; Joju George; Aswathi Menon
- Cinematography: Jithin Stanislaus
- Edited by: Lijo Paul
- Music by: Ifthi
- Production company: Friday Film House
- Distributed by: Friday Tickets
- Release date: 15 February 2019
- Country: India
- Language: Malayalam

June is a 2019 Indian Malayalam-language coming-of-age-romantic comedy film co-written and directed by Ahammed Khabeer. The film stars Rajisha Vijayan in the titular role alongside Sarjano Khalid, Arjun Ashokan, Sunny Wayne, Joju George and Aswathi Menon.

Produced by Vijay Babu through his production company Friday Film House, the film features 15 newcomers in their acting debut. The movie traces the friendship, love, aspirations and lives of June's classmates, through various stages.

== Plot ==
The movie starts with June Sara Joy walking to a beach pub in Varkala town to have a drink. The scene shifts to the past where June who is the only child of her parents Panama Joy and Mini, who is getting ready for the first day of her XI class. She wants to look chic, but Mini is pretty strict, though loving. Joy gives her advice that it is a turning point in her life, and she needs to study hard.

It rains when she gets to school and she sees a handsome boy, Noel, taking a video of the students. He comes up to her and asks where the XI class room is. Both of them belong to the same class so she takes him to the classroom. Most of her friends are from her old class, except for a few new students. When the teacher asks the students to perform a self introduction, all the students do it well, except for Noel and June. Noel was recording the whole introduction session on his handcam and later tells June of his aspiration to be a filmmaker some day. The class teacher appoints Noel and June as the class leaders because she wants them to be smarter. Noel and June start to like each other. We get familiarised with June over the time and we see that she's a happy-go-lucky girl with a creative streak. Meanwhile, the school youth festival happens, and the commerce department wins the championship due to the right plan by Noel. As time progresses, June makes new friends and the whole class bonds together, and her Plus Two batch of 2007 is finally able to become a batch to remember not just for the students, but also for the teachers. Noel, her newfound best friend is now elevated to the level of her boyfriend. They get to connect well with each other as they are both considered to be lagging with their talents. Towards the end of Plus two, when Mini finds out about Noel, June decides to end their relationship. She joins a nearby college while he travels to Mumbai to stay with his parents, and to continue his studies. She spends her college life in misery, after which she goes to Mumbai, gets a job, and stays there with her friend, Abhirami. There, she meets Noel again. They start dating, but they breakup after a while because of his arrogant father and his attachment to him. Heartbroken, June returns to Kerala, and goes to a pub in Varkala.

Back to present, she hits a guy for harassment and ends up in the police station where she meets Anand, a guy from a nearby school which she was in. He takes her home for breakfast and later drops her to the bus stand. On the way he explains how he liked her for years. He ends up accompanying her till her home bus stop. They bond over the journey. It is implied that they date and eventually breakup. The film ends with June becoming an event management company owner and entrepreneur, and choosing to marry Alex whom she meets through her parents and feels an instant connect with, and her friends from schooltime, including Noel and Anand, coming together to celebrate her wedding reception.

== Cast ==
- Rajisha Vijayan as June Sara Joy/Jetty.
- Sunny Wayne as Alex, June's husband (Extended Cameo)
- Sarjano Khalid as Noel Varghese, June's 1st love interest
- Arjun Ashokan as Anand, June's 2nd love interest
- Joju George as 'Panama' Joy Kalarikkal, June's father
- Aswathi Menon as Mini Joy, June's mother
- Vaishnavi Venugopal as Abhirami Narayanan ("Abi") / Mottachi, June's and Noel's best friend
- Aju Varghese as Binoy Varkkala, the man at Varkkala pub
- Nayana Elza as Kunji, June's best friend
- Jishnu Sathyan as Antony / Bruce Lee, Kunji's husband
- Fahim Safar as Sankar Das / Harry Pottan, June and Noel's best friend
- Sanju K. S. as Arjun
- Akhil Manoj as Suraj
- Harisankar as Rahul
- Johnson Joy as himself
- Sruthy Suresh as Sreelakshmi
- Margret Antony as Ann Mary
- Raveena Nair as Fida
- Sruthy Jayan as Maya teacher
- Shiny T Rajan as Anand's mother
- Manoj Kumar as Alex's father
- Jolly Chirayath as Alex's mother
- Kalesh Kalakkodu as Kalesh Binoi, Varkkala's Friend

== Production ==
June marks the directorial debut of Ahammed Khabeer. The film was shot in reverse order of the screenplay from the end to the beginning, allowing actors to undergo physical changes to look younger, along with filming. Rajisha Vijayan lost 9 kilograms (20 lb) and cut her long hair for portraying teenage June. The film was shot mostly in Pathanamthitta, Varkala, Mumbai and Kottayam. The school scenes were shot in Believers Church Residential School, Thiruvalla and Catholicate College, Pathanamthitta.

== Soundtrack ==
June

Soundtrack album by Ifthi
- Released: 2018
- Genre: Feature film soundtrack
- Language: Malayalam
- Label: Friday Film House

The film's soundtrack was composed by Ifthi.

No.	Title	Lyrics	Artist(s)	Length
1.	"Minni Minni"	Vinayak Sasikumar	Amritha Suresh
2.	"Maane Penmaane"	Vinayak Sasikumar	Ifthi
3.	"Uyarum"	Anu Elizabeth Jose	Gowry Lekshmi
4.	"Koodu Vittu"	Vinayak Sasikumar	Bindu Anirudhan
5.	"Melle Melle"	Manu Manjith	Rayshad Rauf, Bindu Anirudhan
6.	"Aadyam Thammil"	Vinayak Sasikumar	Sooraj Santhosh, Anne Amie
7.	"Then Kiliye"	Vinayak Sasikumar	Vineeth Sreenivasan

== Reception ==
=== Critical response ===
Anna Mathews from The Times of India said, "Debut director Ahammed Khabeer goes all out to jog the viewers’ memories of the best of school days when you are in a rush to grow up and he does a good job of it. ‘June’ will appeal to the wide demographic of pre-teens, teens and all those who were teens". A critic from The Hindu wrote, "The film is a winner for its earnestness, its non-judgmental approach towards the female".

=== Box office ===
The film was a commercial success and completed 100 days theatrical run.
