= 4 Years (film) =

2022 Indian Malayalam film

- Poster
- Directed by: Ranjith Sankar
- Written by: Ranjith Sankar
- Produced by: Ranjith Sankar
- Starring: Sarjano Khalid; Priya Prakash Varrier
- Cinematography: Salu K. Thomas
- Edited by: Sangeeth Prathap
- Music by: Shankar Sharma
- Production company: Dreams N Beyond
- Release date: 24 November 2022
- Running time: 122 minutes
- Country: India
- Language: Malayalam

4 Years is a 2022 Indian Malayalam-language film directed by Ranjith Sankar and produced by Dreams N Beyond. The film stars Sarjano Khalid and Priya Prakash Varrier.

== Cast ==
- Sarjano Khalid as Vishal Karunakaran
- Priya Prakash Varrier as Gayathri Arunkumar
- Eldo Raju as Gabri
- Hridya Eldose as Bobby
- Shabnam PA as Anna
- Shiva as Roshan
- Subin Tarsan as Unniyettan

== Production ==
The trailer of the film was released on 5 November 2022. "Paranne" as song from the film was released on 28 November 2022.

== Reception ==
The film released 24 November 2022 in theaters. Vinod Nair critic of The Times of India gave 2.5 stars out of 5 and stated that "Ranjith has successfully woven a story where the viewer is hooked enough to know what happens next." S.R.Praveen critic of The Hindu noted that "An overstretched, hardly-engaging college nostalgia piece".
