= 2017 Kerala actor assault case =

Sexual assault of a Kerala actor

The 2017 Kerala actor assault case was a criminal case in the Indian state of Kerala in which Malayalam film actress Bhavana was abducted and sexually assaulted. The case received wide coverage across India after actor Dileep was charged as a co-accused in an alleged conspiracy behind the assault.

== Background ==
Bhavana is an actress who has worked in Malayalam, Tamil, Telugu, and Kannada films.

Dileep was at the time one of the highest-paid actors in Malayalam cinema and served as treasurer of the Association of Malayalam Movie Artists (AMMA). He and actress Manju Warrier had divorced in 2015. The prosecution alleged that personal animosity connected to this divorce was the motive for the crime.

== Abduction and sexual assault ==
On 17 February 2017, Bhavana was abducted while travelling by car from her home in Thrissur to a film event in Kochi. A group of men forcibly entered her vehicle and held her captive for approximately two hours. During this time, she was sexually assaulted inside the moving car, and parts of the assault were recorded on a mobile phone.

The perpetrators released the actress near the residence of actor-director Lal, who assisted her in reporting the crime to the police the same night. A criminal case was registered immediately, and a special investigation team was constituted.

== Initial investigation and arrests ==
On February 18, 2017, one day after the incident, a Special Investigation Team was formed under Crime Branch of Kerala police. Within two days of the incident, Kerala Police arrested several suspects including the driver of the vehicle and an accomplice of the primary accused. The primary accused, Sunil Kumar, also known as “Pulsar Suni”, surrendered before a magistrate court on 23 February 2017. The memory card containing the recording of the incident was produced at the court by Suni's lawyer.

In April 2017, the police filed the first chargesheet, naming seven accused and detailing offences including kidnapping, gang rape, criminal intimidation, and violations of the Information Technology Act. At this stage, no larger conspiracy was alleged.

== Emergence of conspiracy allegations ==
In June 2017, the investigation took a new turn following the emergence of a letter purportedly written by Pulsar Suni from prison, allegedly addressed to Dileep. The letter suggested that the crime had been carried out on contract. He blamed Dileep for not arranging an advocate for him, and demanded money.

The prosecution alleged that the assault was orchestrated as an act of revenge, claiming that the survivor had informed Manju Warrier of Dileep's extramarital relationship, which contributed to the breakdown of their marriage.

== Arrest of Dileep ==
On 10 July 2017, Dileep was arrested and named as the eighth accused in the case, charged with criminal conspiracy and abetment. The police alleged that the conspiracy was hatched as early as in 2013, with Sunil promised 1.5 crore INR for committing the crime. Following Sunil's arrest, AMMA and other film industry bodies temporarily suspended Dileep from membership. He was later expelled from Kerala Film Producers Association and Film Employees Federation of Kerala. On October 3, 2017, Dileep was released on conditional bail after being in judicial custody for 84 days.

== Supplementary charge sheet ==
In November 2017, the police filed a supplementary charge sheet with 50 witnesses, expanding the scope of the case. The document detailed the alleged conspiracy and named additional accused. Actress Manju Warrier was listed as a key witness to establish motive.

== Public reaction and industry response ==
In May 2017, a group of women actors formed the Women in Cinema Collective (WCC), citing the assault as a catalyst. The collective advocated for safer working conditions and gender equality within the Malayalam film industry. In September 2017, WCC launched Avalkkoppam (With Her), a campaign to stand with the survivor in response to several prominent people supporting Dileep.

In June 2018, AMMA voted to reinstate Dileep, citing procedural grounds. The decision led to strong public backlash, and several WCC members, including the survivor, resigned from the association in protest. Following renewed criticism, Dileep's reinstatement was reversed.

== Trial proceedings ==
In February 2019, on the request by the survivor that a female judge preside over the case, the Kerala government appointed a female judge to hold the trial.

The trial formally began in January 2020, almost three years after the incident, before a special sessions court in Ernakulam. The prosecution listed 261 witnesses. Several witnesses, including film industry figures, turned hostile during the trial. The prominent witnesses that turned hostile were Siddique, Bhama Kurup, Edavela Babu and Bindu Panicker.

During the trial, questions were raised regarding the custody and access logs of the memory card containing the assault video. A court-ordered inquiry found that the card had been accessed multiple times while in judicial custody, though the video content itself was reported to be intact. The memory card was later found to be accessed only by members of the judiciary.

In late 2021, film director Balachandrakumar, who claimed closeness to Dileep, alleged that he possessed copies of the assault video and had repeatedly watched it at home. These claims led to a separate police investigation and registration of a new FIR. Dileep denied the allegations and was granted anticipatory bail.

== Verdict ==
On 8 December 2025, the Ernakulam Principal Sessions Court delivered its verdict.

Six accused, including Pulsar Suni and the other direct perpetrators, were convicted of wrongful confinement, assault to outrage of modesty, assault to disrobe, hurt, gang rape, violation of privacy and for sharing sexually explicit material. They were sentenced to 20 years of rigorous imprisonment and 50,000 INR.

Dileep and three other accused were acquitted, with the court holding that the prosecution had failed to establish their involvement beyond reasonable doubt. The court noted that the conviction of the perpetrators was based on direct evidence, while the conspiracy allegations against Dileep remained circumstantial.

The Kerala government subsequently announced its intention to appeal the acquittals.

== Aftermath ==
Following the verdict, the survivor publicly acknowledged the conviction of the perpetrators while expressing distress over continued harassment and misinformation.
